= Les Conroy =

British television character

- Benidorm character
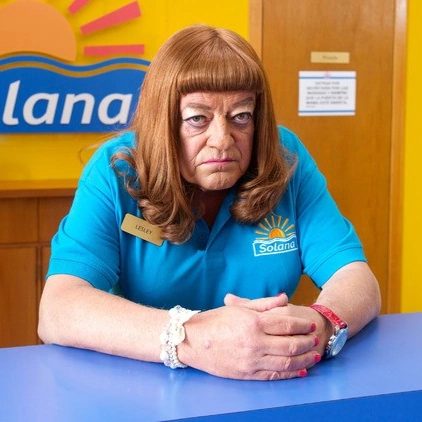
- First appearance: "Episode 17"; 9 October 2009
- Last appearance: "Episode 72"; 18 April 2018
- Created by: Derren Litten
- Portrayed by: Tim Healy

In-universe information
- Alias: Lesley Conroy
- Gender: Male; Transvestite female
- Occupation: Barman
- Spouse: Gloria (divorced)
- Children: Liam Conroy (son)
- Origin: Newcastle-upon-Tyne

Les Conroy (also Lesley) is a fictional character from the ITV comedy sitcom Benidorm, portrayed by Tim Healy. Les first appeared in the second episode of the third series, first broadcast on 9 October 2009. Les is introduced as a blind date for Geoff Maltby (Johnny Vegas), who, unbeknownst to Geoff, is a transvestite female. He later becomes a member of staff at the Solana resort, becoming part of the main cast.

His main storylines throughout his tenure include his friendships with colleagues Mateo Castellanos (Jake Canuso) and Joyce Temple-Savage (Sherrie Hewson), his strong relationship with his son Liam (Adam Gillen) and the discovery of his tax evasion in the United Kingdom, which results in undercover police officers Nigel (Norman Pace) and Dennis (Gareth Hale) investigating him, culminating in his departure.

== Creation and casting ==
Healy was recruited by Derren Litten to join his sitcom Benidorm after they met at the TV Quick Awards in 2007. Healy commented, "Derren was in the bar afterwards so I shook his hand and said, 'Well done, man, it's really funny.' I said, 'I'd love to do one.' So he said, 'What would you like to play?' By this time I'd had a few beers so I said, 'Something people would never expect me to play… I tell you what, a transvestite that kills somebody! Anyway six months later a script arrived and I did that one scene with Johnny Vegas [a hilarious blind date] and they asked me to come back and be a regular. So it was me own fault."

In May 2016, it was announced that Healy would temporarily be written out of the programme during the ninth series in order to recover from health issues he was experiencing. He had fallen ill during filming and was subsequently airlifted back to the United Kingdom to receive further treatment. Despite originally planning to "re-jig" his filming schedule to allow time for him to recover, it was ultimately decided that Healy would not return to filming, appearing in four episodes. Simon Greenall briefly joined the cast as part of a storyline that saw Healy's character return to the United Kingdom, with Greenall's new character introduced as a friend of Les, who agreed to cover for him during his absence.

== Appearances ==
Geoff Maltby (Johnny Vegas) communicates with "Lesley" on an online dating website and arranges to meet. When Lesley arrives, Geoff is shocked to discover a transvestite as his date. He flees and Lesley goes home with a waiter from the restaurant. Les later begins working for Mel Harvey (Geoffrey Hutchings), collecting Janice Garvey (Siobhan Finneran), Mick Garvey (Steve Pemberton) and Michael Garvey (Oliver Stokes) from the airport. However, he forgets to collect entertainer Su Pollard, the major guest for the Benidorm Palace Christmas show, which results in him searching the local area for her, to no avail.

After Mel's death, Les finds work at the Solana resort. He clashes with colleague Mateo Castellanos (Jake Canuso), who is undermined by Les' strong work ethic and is embarrassed that manageress Janey Yorke (Crissy Rock) allows Les to dress as alter ego Lesley. He attempts to get him sacked on multiple occasions though they develop a friendship when Les helps to save his job after Donald Stewart (Kenny Ireland) collapses during Mateo's aqua aerobics session. Les' son Liam Conroy (Adam Gillen) holidays in Benidorm to visit his father and later decides to relocate in order to be closer to Les, admitting to have missed him.

Les and Mateo clash with new manageress Joyce Temple-Savage (Sherrie Hewson) over her managerial style, which results in her alienating holidaymakers over their methods. In her ambition to enhance the Solana to a four-star hotel, she asks Les and Mateo to prepare a traditional Spanish dish for hotel reviewer Victor St James (Ted Robbins). Unwilling to kill a live chicken, Les improvises by preparing a simplistic English dish, which surprisingly enthuses Victor, who claims to hate Spanish cuisine. When the Olympic diving team arrive at the Solana and are unable to prepare a routine after a drunken day out with Liam, Les convinces Mateo and Kenneth Du Beke (Tony Maudsley) to perform their own routine.

Joyce leaves Les in charge as acting manager for one day, which results in chaos. During a misunderstanding with Mateo, in which Les pretends to dismiss him after a complaint from Bianca Dyke (Bel Powley), the entire staff go on strike and begin a protest, gaining television coverage. Les recruits young holidaymakers to fill the void as he attempts to retain the staff. When Joyce returns, she is furious at her findings and informs Les that he will never be considered to fill her role again.

Due to budgeting cuts, Les is dismissed from his position at the Solana though is reinstated as a cleaner. Furious, he confronts Joyce, who reveals that CEO Crystal Hennessy-Vas (Joan Collins) demanded she dismiss various members of staff, though she could not go through with it and instead improvised. Les' ex-wife Gloria (Denise Black) comes to Benidorm and attempts to bribe Les with money to convince Liam to return to the UK to work for her new partner. Both Les and Liam refuse and Les suggests that Liam spend time with his mother before she returns home.

After Liam moves to Madrid, Les becomes miserable as he misses him. New staff member Amber Platt (Jessica Ellerby) is concerned about Les and convinces Mateo and other staff to contribute to buying him a ticket to Madrid to visit Liam. Liam later surprises Les with a karaoke performance with Kenneth on stage at Neptune's and informs him that he intends to return to Benidorm. Les embraces him son and tells him he can live with him as long as he needs.

When Les briefly returns to the UK, he is arrested due to tax evasion. He manages to return to Benidorm though becomes anxious as he is on the run from the police. Undercover police officers Nigel (Norman Pace) and Dennis (Gareth Hale) travel to Benidorm, intending on arresting Les. However, after Les resuscitates Nigel after he collapses in the pool, both have a change of heart. However, Les flees and sends an emotional letter to Liam, revealing his reasons for leaving and tells him that he loves him. Liam informs Kenneth that he intends to return to the UK to support Les through his trial.

== Development ==
Les is the calm, practical, friendly and resourceful barman at the hotel pool and behind the desk in reception. He's also a hard-worker with good ideas, and a loving dad to his son Liam. Les is a transvestite and so can sometimes be seen wearing a wig and rollerskating around the pool as 'Lesley'. He and Mateo usually get on despite his showing Mateo up as being lazy.

— British Comedy Guide on Les

After his guest stint, Les was reintroduced as a main cast member for the fourth series, having made an appearance in the Christmas special in 2010. Discussing his return and how he developed Les' characterisation, Healy said: "I'm really enjoying the part and I'm chuffed to be back. I've tried to incorporate some of my heroes in Lesley. There's a bit of Tommy Cooper in there and the other one I've drawn from is Les Dawson. The thing with Les/Lesley is that he's basically the same person whatever he's wearing".

For the fourth series, writers decided to explore Les' character further, introducing his son Liam (Adam Gillen). Speaking about the relationship between father and son, Healy said: "Liam's quite a placid lad and I don't think his dad's dressing up bothers him. It's lovely they have a bit of time to do some father-son bonding". During the seventh series, Healy teased a storyline in which his ex-wife Gloria (Denise Black) appears and attempts to convince Liam to return to the UK, though Liam ultimately refuses in order to be closer to his father, reflecting the close relationship between them: "There is a great storyline where my ex-wife comes back. She is quite a hard piece of work, and she wants our son to go back to England with her. But Liam wants to stay with his Dad. It's quite a moving storyline. That father-son relationship works very well". Healy and Gillen developed a friendship off-screen and, when Gillen briefly left the show after the seventh series, Healy said: "[Les] doesn't actually mention Liam at all, but as far as I'm concerned I miss him dearly. As a character but as my friend as well, he's a lovely lad, a pleasure to work with and it's a big miss for me".

As a member of Solana staff, the series saw Les develop an unlikely friendship with his colleague Mateo Castellanos (Jake Canuso). Discussing the dynamic between the two characters, Healy stated: "They are opposites because Mateo is lazy and wants to make minimal effort, whereas Lesley loves doing that bar job. The final straw for Mateo comes when Les suggests they start waiting at tables because it means he'd have to work harder". Canuso referred to Solana staff characters as "outsiders" though believed that antipathy became a grudging fondness between them, adding: "You don't think of them as having friends. They're loners. It evolves and changes and reoccurs".

== Reception ==
After his initial guest appearance as Lesley, Jane Simon from The Mirror referred to Healy's performance as "a brilliant guest starring role", adding in a positive review of Benidorm as "definitely [having] its attractions". Additionally, John Robinson from The Guardian spoke positively about Healy's debut, stating: "Tim Healy's guest spot is certainly one to remember".

During the storyline in which Joyce Temple-Savage (Sherrie Hewson) appoints Les as acting manager of the Solana, Patrick Mulkern from Radio Times praised Healy's comedic performance and contribution to the episode: "She leaves Leslie, the normally affable transvestite, in charge of the Solana and the power instantly goes to his head - an implausible transformation, but it taps into Tim Healy's comic potential. He's never been funnier".

Brian Slade from Television Heaven considered how the character was part of the development of the series as it continued to gain popularity: "As the Benidorm juggernaut rolled on, characters became more outrageous – cross-dressing bar staff Lesley [was] added and formed a focal point for many of the subsequent storylines".

Akhona Zungu referred to Les as "one of the show's more daring comic conceits". She added that Healy portrayed the role with "considerable warmth and commitment" and described him as "one of the show's most beloved regulars".

== See also ==
- List of Benidorm characters
