= Geoff Maltby =

Television show character

- Benidorm character
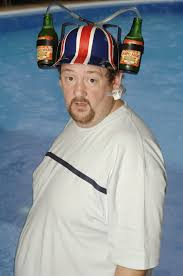
- First appearance: "Episode 1"; 1 February 2007
- Last appearance: "Episode 64"; 26 April 2017
- Created by: Derren Litten
- Portrayed by: Johnny Vegas

In-universe information
- Alias: The Oracle
- Occupation: Pub quiz champion
- Significant others: Chantelle Garvey; Ionela
- Children: Pythagoras Maltby (son)
- Relatives: Ron Maltby (adoptive father); Noreen Maltby (adoptive mother); Pauline Maltby (adoptive sister); Doreen (adoptive aunt)
- Origin: Lancashire

Geoff Maltby is a fictional character from the ITV comedy sitcom Benidorm, portrayed by Johnny Vegas. Geoff first appeared in the pilot episode of the series, first broadcast on 1 February 2007. Geoff is introduced as a pub quiz champion, holidaying with his elderly mother Noreen Maltby (Elsie Kelly). His main storylines include his relationship with Chantelle Garvey (Hannah Hobley), his short-lived engagement to gold digger Ionela (Milanka Brooks), discovering that he is adopted and supporting his sister Pauline (Selina Griffiths) through her relapse from alcoholism.

== Creation and casting ==
Johnny Vegas formed part of the original cast of Benidorm, portraying the role of pub quiz champion Geoff Maltby. The character was situated as a holidaymaker, accompanied by his mother Noreen Maltby, portrayed by Elsie Kelly.

During an appearance on The Graham Norton Show, Vegas was asked about filming on location in Benidorm: "Everyone goes it's like the Blackpool of Spain and you go, no it's not... I've had fun in Blackpool. It's like Christmas every day. But Christmas... in an asylum". Creator Derren Litten responded afterwards on his blog: "What I... have a problem with is Johnny painting Benidorm as this horrific, unspeakable place where it's impossible to have fun. Something millions of returning holiday makers to Benidorm every year would disagree with. This also comes after shooting 'Benidorm' [series] 3 where, one night, Johnny confided in me, 'all my friends are embarrassed I'm in this show'. I didn't really have an answer to that. I still don't."

In April 2010, it was announced that Vegas' character had been axed ahead of the fourth series in order to pave the way for a new group of characters to be introduced. Although Vegas was disappointed to leave the programme, he said he understood the move: "Benidorm's happening again but I won't be part of it. Unfortunately, it will be fun in the sun without us." Later that month, Hannah Hobley, who portrayed the character's love interest Chantelle Garvey, confirmed that she would not reprise her role following Vegas' departure, commenting: "The decision was made some time ago that the story between my character 'Telle and The Oracle, played by my co-star and friend Johnny Vegas, had reached a natural conclusion, as the two unlikely lovers walked off hand in hand to the strains of Spanish Eyes at the end of series three."

In March 2014, it was announced that Vegas would reprise his role in the seventh series. Vegas was one of several former characters to be returning, including Kelly, with ITV director of entertainment Elaine Bedell stating: "We're equally pleased that some familiar faces from the Solana's past will be making a welcome return to the sunshine." In March 2017, it was confirmed that Vegas would not reprise his role after the ninth series.

== Appearances ==
Geoff comes to Benidorm on holiday with his mother Noreen (Elsie Kelly), although he tells other holidaymakers that she is his personal assistant. He is a pub quiz champion and self-proclaims himself as "The Oracle", boasting to other guests of his general knowledge skills. At Neptune’s quiz night, he is narrowly defeated by the Garvey family. Furious, he causes a scene on stage and, when barman Mateo Castellanos (Jake Canuso) confronts him, Geoff reveals to the entire bar that Mateo has slept with both Troy Ganatra and Kate Weedon (Abigail Cruttenden).

Geoff goes on a date with Chantelle Garvey (Hannah Hobley), however he gets drunk and the date ends in disaster. He is refused entry by Mateo to the wedding of Chantelle's grandmother Madge Harvey (Sheila Reid) and Mel Harvey (Geoffrey Hutchings). Geoff proceeds to hire a paraglider and loses control, crashing into Mel and ruining the ceremony.

Noreen begins to question why Geoff is uninterested in women, considering the fact he has never been in a relationship. Mateo suggests that he is homosexual and miscommunication between mother and son results in her believing this to be true. Noreen announces this in Neptune’s, which embarrasses Geoff. He then goes on a blind date with a woman he has been communicating with online though is shocked when transvestite Les Conroy (Tim Healy) appears. When the Solana is targeted in a robbery, Geoff lies to Noreen that he fought off five thieves, informing her of a false story. When Noreen tells the police, they arrest him for wasting police time. Geoff is furious with his mother’s constant interventions in his life and decides to move out when they return home. He later rekindles his romance with Chantelle and they decide to move in together.

Off-screen, Geoff and Chantelle have a son and name him Pythagoras after the Greek philosopher. They subsequently split up.

Geoff returns to the Solana with Noreen for a Bullseye-style quiz. He feuds with Clive (Perry Benson) and Tiger Dyke (Danny Walters) though catches the eye of Clive’s sister Terri Dawson (Charlotte Eaton). He later reveals that he is engaged to gold digger Ionella (Milanka Brooks), having lied to her claiming to be a successful businessman. Geoff and Noreen get trapped in an elevator and she reveals that he is adopted. Geoff embraces Noreen as his mother and opts against her suggestion of tracking down his biological mother. He tells Ionella the truth and she leaves him immediately.

When his sister Pauline (Selina Griffiths) joins Geoff and Noreen on holiday, Geoff becomes very concerned when Pauline, a recovering alcoholic, falls off the wagon. The family decided to cut their holiday short and return home to enhance her recovery. Before leaving, Geoff comes across Ionella and tries to convince her to get back with him, however she ends up rejecting him at the airport.

Geoff becomes convinced that Pauline is pregnant. After Geoff spends the day trying to find out who the father might be, she reveals she is not pregnant after it is revealed that the pregnancy test she took was from a faulty batch. More trouble comes to the family when Pauline's controlling boyfriend Malcolm Barrett (Mark Heap) arrives at the Solana. Geoff and Malcolm immediately clash and Geoff gets very protective over Pauline. Geoff then supports Pauline when she ends her relationship with Malcolm.

== Development ==
'Rotund', 'anally retentive', 'spoilt' and 'frustrated' are four words you could use to describe Geoff Maltby. Known as 'The Oracle' because of his computer-like knowledge of trivial facts and figures, Geoff holidayed at The Solana Apartments for many years with his mother (although in the early days he wanted everyone to think she was his Personal Assistant). He disappeared for a few years, but now he's back. Geoff is a Lancashire pub quiz champion. Never far from a competition, a wager or just an argument, Geoff often organises holiday pursuits. These have included an arm-wrestling competition and a beach-side sporting activity which had near fatal results.

— British Comedy Guide on Geoff

Summarising the characterisation of Geoff, Vegas said: "He's actually a very sad character. He has no people skills whatsoever. He is so arrogant, he gives himself the nickname of 'The Oracle'. But he fails to realise that nobody on this holiday will be remotely impressed by the fact that he's been unbeaten in pub quizzes for the last nine years. Like John Turturro's character in Quiz Show, he can only communicate through trivia. I see him as a lonely virgin."

Reflecting on the success of Benidorm and the impact of the series' characters, Vegas commented: "It's popular because it's massively accessible and it's got characters everyone can relate to. The vast majority have been on these kind of holidays. And while everyone identifies the characters, they never identify themselves. I see my own family in the Garveys. You've got to suspend your disbelief a little bit when all the same characters end up back on the same holiday. But I think it's a sign of how loved it is that people aren't bothered about the details. They just want everyone back."

During the third series, the character's romantic life was explored further, with Geoff exploring internet dating forums. Tim Healy joined the cast for a comedic storyline involving Geoff, portraying transvestite Lesley Conroy who Geoff goes on a blind date with. Discussing Healy's casting, Vegas said: "I got a text from a friend saying she’d just been talking to Tim and apparently he was my new love interest. I started panicking about how I was going to approach my first on-screen male kiss. The agent was on speed dial, I promise you. I was gearing myself up to say, 'Er you remember the clause about no Speedos? I might have a second one to add to that...'"

Upon the character's return during the seventh series, a storyline saw Geoff discover that he was adopted as a baby. This saw a shift in Geoff's characterisation and his relationship with his mother Noreen, in which he addresses her as his mother publicly, challenging the long-running motif in which Geoff refers to Noreen as "[his PA]". Reflecting on the storyline, Vegas said: "Obviously it is a comedy, but I think all the good comedies can mix that light and dark. When I got the scene it was one of those that I couldn't wait to play".

Discussing how his character's relationship with his mother had evolved, Vegas considered how the revelation of his character being adopted saw him embrace his mother further: "It has [changed]... but they still have their moments. He's certainly more protective over his mother now, they've had this emotional breakthrough". He further addressed how the eighth series situated the entire Maltby together on-screen for the first time and considered the power dynamic between Geoff and his sister Pauline (Selina Griffiths): "Because he's so competitive with his sister he also thinks that he can look after his mum better than she can".

During the ninth series, Geoff portrayed the role of a concerning and supportive brother towards Pauline during her relapse from alcoholism and her pregnancy scare. Vegas stated: "Geoff has turned a bit of a corner now. He's not such an idiot. He's got over the fact he was adopted, and likes to be part of the family unit. Normally in Benidorm it's 'What are we going to do about Geoff?' Now it's 'What are we going to do about Pauline?' Her problems have overtaken his."

== Reception ==
Brian Slade from Television Heaven gave a positive response to the character: "Johnny Vegas as Geoff, a socially awkward pub quiz champion, was a joy as he tried to keep up the façade of his mother actually being his PA". Some reviewers considered the character to be underused during his tenure. One reviewer from The Custard TV commented: "One gripe: Johnny Vegas is underused".

During negative reviews of Benidorm, Vegas' portrayal often maintained a positive response. A source from The Mirror referred to the humorous nature of the character's diving competition in the second series: "Benidorm does have its genuine sunny spells; Johnny Vegas's stunt diving is a thing of awe". This scene was also considered in another negative review of the show by Sam Wollaston of The Guardian: "It says something about the quality of the writing when the funniest thing about a show is Johnny Vegas failing to dive into the pool, again and again".
