= Benidorm series 1 =

Season of television series

Benidorm
- Series 1
- Starring: Paul Bazely; Nicholas Burns; Jake Canuso; Abigail Cruttenden; Janine Duvitski; Hannah Hobley; Siobhan Finneran; Kenny Ireland; Elsie Kelly; Steve Pemberton; Sheila Reid; Crissy Rock; Hugh Sachs; Paul Smith; Oliver Stokes; Johnny Vegas
- No. of episodes: 6

Release
- Original network: ITV
- Original release: 1 February – 8 March 2007

Series chronology
- Next → Series 2

The inaugural series of the ITV television series Benidorm, which is a sitcom set in an all-inclusive holiday resort (The Solana) in Benidorm, Spain, began broadcasting on 1 February 2007, consisting of six episodes. The entire series was directed by Kevin Allen and written by Derren Litten. The first series introduced the Garvey family, consisting of Mick (Steve Pemberton), Janice (Siobhan Finneran), Chantelle (Hannah Hobley), Michael (Oliver Stokes) and Janice's mother Madge Barron (Sheila Reid); swingers Donald (Kenny Ireland) and Jacqueline Stewart (Janine Duvitski); mother and son Noreen (Elsie Kelly) and Geoff "The Oracle" Maltby (Johnny Vegas); homosexual couple Gavin (Hugh Sachs) and Troy Ramsbottom (Paul Bazely); un-keen couple Kate (Abigail Cruttenden) and Martin Weedon (Nicholas Burns); and Solana staff Mateo Castellanos (Jake Canuso) and manageress Janey York (Crissy Rock).

Overall, the series received an average viewership of 4.43 million, with the opening episode receiving 5.86 million viewers. The series concluded on 8 March, with the series finale attracting 4.13 million. The first series was heavily praised, resulting in it being recommissioned for a second series, which was broadcast between March and May 2008.

== Cast ==
=== Main ===
- Paul Bazely as Troy Ramsbottom
- Nicholas Burns as Martin Weedon
- Jake Canuso as Mateo Castellanos
- Abigail Cruttenden as Kate Weedon
- Janine Duvitski as Jacqueline Stewart
- Hannah Hobley as Chantelle Garvey
- Siobhan Finneran as Janice Garvey
- Kenny Ireland as Donald Stewart
- Elsie Kelly as Noreen Maltby
- Steve Pemberton as Mick Garvey
- Sheila Reid as Madge Harvey
- Crissy Rock as Janey York
- Paul Smith as Daniel
- Oliver Stokes as Michael Garvey
- Hugh Sachs as Gavin Ramsbottom
- Johnny Vegas as Geoff Maltby

=== Recurring ===
- Jan Graveson as Susie

=== Guest ===
- Niky Wardley as Kelly

== Episodes ==
No.	Title	Directed by	Written by	Original release date	UK viewers (millions)
1	"Episode 1"	Kevin Allen	Derren Litten	1 February 2007	5.86
A group of holidaymakers arrive at the Solana resort in Benidorm. The holidaymakers come from very different backgrounds, consisting of Scottish swingers Donald and Jacqueline, the wimpy Martin and his snobbish, miserable wife Kate, Geoff Maltby and his mum Noreen—and the Garvey family, consisting of dad Mick, mum Janice, loud-mouthed chain smoking Madge and two children, Michael and Chantelle, who is hiding a big secret.
2	"Episode 2"	Kevin Allen	Derren Litten	8 February 2007	4.86
The Garvey family is calming down after discovering Chantelle's secret pregnancy. However, Madge is quick to stir up trouble. Meanwhile, Martin tries to cheer Kate up with a trip into Benidorm, with disastrous results when they encounter the legendary "Sticky Vicky", and Geoff is attempting to break a world record for holding his breath underwater.
3	"Episode 3"	Kevin Allen	Derren Litten	15 February 2007	3.88
Kelly, who works at The Solana, has just got engaged to womanising barman Mateo, leaving Donald and Jacqueline worried. But Mateo seems more interested in Kate, and the unlikely pair soon end up having a passionate encounter. But will Martin discover his wife's betrayal? Meanwhile, Chantelle's pregnancy ends up pushing her and Janice closer together, whilst Geoff and Noreen do a duet at the karaoke.
4	"Episode 4"	Kevin Allen	Derren Litten	22 February 2007	4.02
Madge is tricked into believing that Donald and Jacqueline are a sociable couple. They mistake Madge for a swinger, and things get out of hand. Meanwhile, Martin is upbeat now that his marriage seems to be back on track. But Kate feels guilty after her encounter with Mateo. Elsewhere, Janice becomes jealous of Suzie, a geordie girl who seems to have hit it off with Mick, whilst Mateo seduces another holidaymaker—Troy.
5	"Episode 5"	Kevin Allen	Derren Litten	1 March 2007	3.85
It is quiz night at The Solana, and the Oracle (Geoff) believes that this is his big moment. However, Geoff was so angry when he didn't win, he revealed shocking secrets that could tear lives apart. Meanwhile, Donald tries to save Gavin and Troy's relationship after Troy's shocking betrayal with Mateo, whilst Kate confides in Madge about the problems in her marriage.
6	"Episode 6"	Kevin Allen	Derren Litten	8 March 2007	4.13
After the Garveys win their €100 prize from last night's quiz, they decide to go to the beach—though Madge has invited Donald and Jacqueline, much to the disapproval of miserly Mick. Later back at the Solana, Kate is scarred for life after picking up faeces in the swimming pool. Meanwhile, a con artist tries her luck with the holidaymakers—and the Garveys find themselves in trouble, when Mick's past comes back to haunt him.

== Home media ==
The first series was released on DVD in the United Kingdom on 27 April 2008. The DVD includes cast interviews and a photo album.

The first series first became available for streaming through Netflix in the United Kingdom on 1 October 2015.

== Ratings ==
Benidorm : UK viewers per episode (millions)

Season	Episode number						Average
Season	1	2	3	4	5	6	Average
1	5.86	4.86	3.88	4.02	3.85	4.13	4.43

Audience measurement performed by Broadcasters' Audience Research Board

Episode	Running time (exc. adverts)	Original air date (United Kingdom)	ITV ratings (millions)	Weekly rank	Rating increase / decrease
1	22 minutes	1 February 2007	5.86	22	N/A
2	22 minutes	8 February 2007	4.86	25	Decrease
3	22 minutes	15 February 2007	3.88	29	Decrease
4	22 minutes	22 February 2007	4.02	27	Increase
5	22 minutes	1 March 2007	3.85	Outside Top 30	Decrease
6	22 minutes	8 March 2007	4.13	25	Increase
Series average		2007	4.43	—	
