= Benidorm series 2 =

Benidorm
- Series 2
- Starring: Paul Bazely; Nicholas Burns; Jake Canuso; Abigail Cruttenden; Janine Duvitski; Hannah Hobley; Geoffrey Hutchings; Siobhan Finneran; Kenny Ireland; Hannah Hobley; Kenny Ireland; Elsie Kelly; Steve Pemberton; Sheila Reid; Crissy Rock; Hugh Sachs; Oliver Stokes; Johnny Vegas; Niky Wardley; Elliott Jordan; Cameron & Paris Jimenez Tobe
- No. of episodes: 8

Release
- Original network: ITV
- Original release: 28 March – 16 May 2008

Series chronology
- ← Previous; Series 1 Next → Series 3

The second series of the ITV television series Benidorm began broadcasting on 28 March 2008. Consisting of eight episodes, the sitcom is set in an all-inclusive holiday resort (The Solana) in Benidorm, Spain. The entire series was directed by Sandy Johnson and written by Derren Litten. Returning from the first series were the Garvey family, consisting of Mick (Steve Pemberton), Janice (Siobhan Finneran), Chantelle (Hannah Hobley), Michael (Oliver Stokes) and Janice's mother Madge Barron (Sheila Reid), whereas Geoffrey Hutchings was introduced as Mel Harvey, Madge's new fiancé; swingers Donald (Kenny Ireland) and Jacqueline Stewart (Janine Duvitski); mother and son Noreen (Elsie Kelly) and Geoff "The Oracle" Maltby (Johnny Vegas); homosexual couple Gavin (Hugh Sachs) and Troy Ramsbottom (Paul Bazely); un-keen couple Kate (Abigail Cruttenden) and Martin Weedon (Nicholas Burns); and Solana staff Mateo Castellanos (Jake Canuso) and manageress Janey York (Crissy Rock).

Overall, the series received an average viewership of 5.98 million, with the opening episode receiving 7.14 million viewers. The series concluded on 16 May 2008, with the series finale attracting 6.32 million viewers. As a result of the second series' finale being left on a cliffhanger, a special was broadcast over a year later on 31 May 2009, which was produced in order to conclude the second series before the third series was broadcast in late 2009.

== Cast ==
=== Main ===
- Paul Bazely as Troy Ramsbottom
- Nicholas Burns as Martin Weedon
- Jake Canuso as Mateo Castellanos
- Abigail Cruttenden as Kate Weedon
- Janine Duvitski as Jacqueline Stewart
- Hannah Hobley as Chantelle Garvey
- Geoffrey Hutchings as Mel Harvey
- Siobhan Finneran as Janice Garvey
- Kenny Ireland as Donald Stewart
- Elsie Kelly as Noreen Maltby
- Steve Pemberton as Mick Garvey
- Sheila Reid as Madge Harvey
- Hugh Sachs as Gavin Ramsbottom
- Oliver Stokes as Michael Garvey
- Crissy Rock as Janey York
- Johnny Vegas as Geoff Maltby
- Niky Wardley as Kelly (Note: Wardley and Jordan are only credited in the episodes in which they appear.)
- Elliott Jordan as Jack
- Cameron & Paris Jimenez Tobe as Coolio Garvey (Note: Credited in episode eight only.)

=== Guest ===
- Wendy Richard as Sylvia
- Margi Clarke as Dorothy

== Episodes ==
No. overall	Episode	Directed by	Written by	Original release date	UK viewers (millions)
7	"Episode 1"	Sandy Johnson	Derren Litten	28 March 2008	7.14
The Garveys and the rest of the holidaymakers return for another week in Benidorm – with a few new members of the family. These include Madge's new boyfriend Mel (whom she has only known for a few weeks and is a "successful businessman with 5 sunbed shops in Manchester"), and Chantelle's baby son Coolio. Martin and Kate escape the horrors of their last holiday by staying in Altea, but a problem with the room leads to Kate facing her worst nightmare. Later, a diving competition between Mel and Geoff turns into a tragic life-threatening incident.
8	"Episode 2"	Sandy Johnson	Derren Litten	4 April 2008	6.05
Chantelle asks Martin and Kate to babysit Coolio for the night, which ends in him taking a liking to Martin. Mel's recovery from the diving accident might not have helped his singing voice when his karaoke at Neptune's goes sour. After the singing, Mel proposes to Madge – and tries to do it romantically, but fails due to his bad back.
9	"Episode 3"	Sandy Johnson	Derren Litten	11 April 2008	5.59
Madge and Janice's mother-and-daughter relationship turns sour when she tries to persuade Madge not to marry Mel. Meanwhile, Geoff and his mum Noreen organise their own arm-wrestling competition, with Mick being beaten by Jacqueline due to her "strong wrists".
10	"Episode 4"	Sandy Johnson	Derren Litten	18 April 2008	6.29
The holidaymakers are up for a coach trip to see a free bullfight, but Madge has terrible diarrhoea – making them late by stopping all the time. Just as the holidaymakers think things cannot possibly get any worse, Janey tries to flog €200 electric juicers. Unfortunately, she has to sell at least one juicer or the holidaymakers are not allowed to watch the fight. To stop the fuss, Mel agrees to buy one – only to hear of the price. Just after, the holidaymakers go to see the bullfight, it does not go as planned – it turns out the bull is replaced by a dog with fake horns, and Mateo is the bullfighter. During the bullfight, the electric juicer that Mel purchased blows up. To everyone's shock, Kate announces he is dead – until he wakes up, scaring everybody. Meanwhile at the Solana, Geoff and Chantelle decide not to see the bullfight, and instead have a few burgers on the poolside with each other and baby Coolio.
11	"Episode 5"	Sandy Johnson	Derren Litten	25 April 2008	5.70
Ex-hotel worker Kelly is back, this time with her cockney mother, Sylvia. As Sylvia's mobility scooter stops working, Mel offers to fix it, but Michael and Chantelle think he is kissing her. Madge then finds out about the incident, not knowing it was a misunderstanding – and begins a poolside showdown with her.
12	"Episode 6"	Sandy Johnson	Derren Litten	2 May 2008	5.21
In a last-ditch effort, Mick and Janice both try to persuade Madge not to get married. Meanwhile, Mick has upset Janice by forgetting it's their 10th wedding anniversary. Janice tries her best to give him hints, but he is still not aware of the occasion. That morning, Janice goes to a local bar for a drink with Madge, and finds out the young owner, Jack, has a crush on her. As Janice forgot her money, Jack tells Janice she can pay him with a kiss. As her mother leaves, she secretly snogs Jack – but she soon realises her mistake, as he quickly becomes obsessed with her. Later that night in Neptune's, Janice cries and opens up to Mick, finally revealing that it was their anniversary, but still keeping the secret of kissing Jack.
13	"Episode 7"	Sandy Johnson	Derren Litten	9 May 2008	5.57
Things turn serious for Martin – not only has Kate taken all her luggage and disappeared, but Gavin's mum, Dorothy, uses him as a target for warding off Mateo. Meanwhile, Gavin spends some quality time with his mum, but is upset when she leaves after just one day.
14	"Episode 8"	Sandy Johnson	Derren Litten	16 May 2008	6.32
It's the wedding day, but Mel and Madge's night before is ruined, after they discover they are on a very inappropriate beach. However as the wedding goes on, interruptions from Jack, Janice's stalker, as well as Martin, and a final disastrous accident ends the ceremony altogether and leaves Mel in hospital.

== Home media ==
The second series was released on DVD in the United Kingdom on 17 November 2008. The two-disc set, produced by 2 Entertain, includes all episodes of the second series of the ITV comedy, along with special features such as outtakes and audio commentaries.

The second series first became available for streaming through Netflix in the United Kingdom on 1 October 2015.

== Ratings ==
Episode	Running time (exc. adverts)	Original air date (United Kingdom)	ITV ratings (millions)	Weekly rank	Rating increase / decrease
1	22 minutes	28 March 2008	7.14	12	N/A
2	22 minutes	4 April 2008	6.05	13	Decrease
3	22 minutes	11 April 2008	5.59	17	Decrease
4	22 minutes	18 April 2008	6.29	14	Increase
5	22 minutes	25 April 2008	5.70	14	Decrease
6	22 minutes	2 May 2008	5.21	15	Decrease
7	22 minutes	9 May 2008	5.57	15	Increase
8	22 minutes	16 May 2008	6.32	10	Increase
Series average		2008	5.98	—	
