= Benidorm series 3 =

Benidorm
- Series 3
- Starring: Paul Bazely; Nicholas Burns; Jake Canuso; Janine Duvitski; Siobhan Finneran; Hannah Hobley; Geoffrey Hutchings; Kenny Ireland; Elsie Kelly; Steve Pemberton; Sheila Reid; Hugh Sachs; Crissy Rock; Oliver Stokes; Zane Bainbridge; Leon Bainbridge; Johnny Vegas; Nathaniel Walker; Nicholas Walker
- No. of episodes: 6 (+1 special)

Release
- Original network: ITV
- Original release: 31 May – 6 November 2009

Season chronology
- ← Previous; Series 2 Next → Series 4

The third series of the ITV television series Benidorm, which is a sitcom set in an all-inclusive holiday resort (The Solana) in Benidorm, Spain, began broadcasting on 2 October 2009, consisting of six episodes. It was preceded by a special, which aired on 31 May 2009, serving as a bridge between the second and third series. The entire series was directed by Sandy Johnson and written by Derren Litten. Returning from the second series were the Garvey family, consisting of Mick (Steve Pemberton), Janice (Siobhan Finneran), Chantelle (Hannah Hobley), Michael (Oliver Stokes), Coolio (Zane Bainbridge, Leon Bainbridge, Nathaniel Walker, and Nicholas Walker), Janice's mother Madge Barron (Sheila Reid) and Madge's husband Mel Harvey (Geoffrey Hutchings); swingers Donald (Kenny Ireland) and Jacqueline Stewart (Janine Duvitski); mother and son Noreen (Elsie Kelly) and Geoff "The Oracle" Maltby (Johnny Vegas); homosexual couple Gavin (Hugh Sachs) and Troy Ramsbottom (Paul Bazely); Martin Weedon (Nicholas Burns); and Solana staff Mateo Castellanos (Jake Canuso) and manageress Janey York (Crissy Rock). Sheridan Smith joined the cast as Brandy, a new holiday companion and love interest of Martin. This was the final series to feature Vegas, Hobley and Burns, whereas it was the only series to feature Smith. Hutchings died in July 2010 and this was the final series in which he featured.

Overall, the series received an average viewership of 6.52 million, with the opening episode receiving 6.5 million viewers. The series concluded on 6 November 2009, with the series finale attracting 6.8 million viewers.

== Cast ==
=== Main ===
- Paul Bazely as Troy Ramsbottom
- Nicholas Burns as Martin Weedon
- Jake Canuso as Mateo Castellanos
- Janine Duvitski as Jacqueline Stewart
- Siobhan Finneran as Janice Garvey
- Hannah Hobley as Chantelle Garvey
- Geoffrey Hutchings as Mel Harvey
- Kenny Ireland as Donald Stewart
- Elsie Kelly as Noreen Maltby
- Steve Pemberton as Mick Garvey
- Sheila Reid as Madge Harvey
- Hugh Sachs as Gavin Ramsbottom
- Crissy Rock as Janey Yorke
- Oliver Stokes as Michael Garvey
- Zane Bainbridge, Leon Bainbridge, Nathaniel Walker, and Nicholas Walker as Coolio Garvey
- Johnny Vegas as Geoff Maltby

=== Recurring ===
- Sheridan Smith as Brandy
- Shaun Foster-Conley as himself
- Tim Healy as Les/Lesley Conroy
- Abigail Cruttenden as Kate Weedon (Note: Cruttenden is main cast in the summer special.)

=== Guest ===
- Sticky Vicky as herself
- Robin Askwith as Gary Snelling
- Una Stubbs as Diana Weedon

== Episodes ==
No. overall	Episode	Directed by	Written by	Original release date	UK viewers (millions)
Special
15	"Summer Special"	Sandy Johnson	Derren Litten	31 May 2009	5.23
As the guests head back to the Solana, Madge and Janice get a lift to the police station and hospital from a Spanish man who turns out to be a drug-smuggler with a gun who wants them to smuggle a package back to England and threatens to kill them if they refuse. He takes them back to the Solana, and when they shout for help, Mick, Mateo, Donald, Troy and Gavin join them being held hostage. He takes them to the rooftop and threatens to throw them off the roof if the police do not let him go. Mel turns up in a helicopter and knocks the drug-smuggler unconscious with a bat, having finally got back his memory. The Solana offers all those involved a free one-week holiday for the following year.
Series
16	"Episode 1"	Sandy Johnson	Derren Litten	2 October 2009	6.50
The holidaymakers are back on the free holiday they were offered after the dramatic events on the rooftop. Mel, Madge's husband, has set up a mobility shop on the promenade, with a special grand opening planned, and Mick, now Mel's employee back in the UK, helps to promote it. Martin returns, but without Kate, as they have separated, and instead, he is with Brandy, a young, blonde girl from Liverpool. Later, Martin is shocked to see a face from the past. Due to the excessive number of coloured electric lights he has set up, the mobility shop goes up in flames during the opening ceremony.
17	"Episode 2"	Sandy Johnson	Derren Litten	9 October 2009	6.17
The holidaymakers take a trip to the waterfalls of Callosa, where Mick falls out with Janice and the rest of his family. To stop the fuss, he disappears, worrying Janice. But when he returns later, he has a special surprise. Geoff decides not go on the trip because he is still upset with his mother, and he spends much of the day chatting on a dating site, although he is unaware that he is speaking to a transvestite.
18	"Episode 3"	Sandy Johnson	Derren Litten	16 October 2009	6.38
Geoff takes the next step in his love life and meets up with his internet date, much to his surprise. Meanwhile, Brandy seduces Mateo, while still leading on Martin. Mel takes the Garveys on a sickly boat ride to Peacock Island, where Mel tries to find the owner of the island, having ideas of building a hotel and leisure businesses, but it turns out the island is a protected nature reserve which cannot be developed.
19	"Episode 4"	Sandy Johnson	Derren Litten	23 October 2009	6.68
One of Madge's daughters, Valda, stays at the Solana with her young Indian husband, Vikram. Madge also has an upset stomach and Michael steals some tablets from Brandy's bag, not knowing that they are drugs. A scammer called Gary enters, who Brandy is already dating. It turns out Brandy is a scammer as well, and they both hatch a plan – to burgle the Solana. Whilst Brandy and Gary are robbing the rooms, a high Madge sings karaoke and falls onto Valda as she jumps off the stage. Troy went to get his camera to record Madge singing, but catches Brandy robbing his room before being tied to a radiator by Gary. Martin returns to his room, only to find out that his belongings have been stolen and sees Troy, much to Gavin's horror who comes up after Madge's karaoke. Martin, without a phone or passport uses the hotel telephone to call Kate for assistance.
20	"Episode 5"	Sandy Johnson	Derren Litten	30 October 2009	6.61
The Garveys take a trip to the Benidorm Palace, whilst Gavin has suspicions that Troy is cheating on him. Meanwhile, both Martin's mum Diana and wife Kate arrive unexpectedly to help him out, after he lost his passport and money in the robbery.
21	"Episode 6"	Sandy Johnson	Derren Litten	6 November 2009	6.80
Madge & Mel have their hearts set on a new business venture in Benidorm. As feelings between Geoff and Chantelle run high, Martin has one last chance to persuade Kate to re-build their relationship. Meanwhile, an old friend of Donald, Wink McAndrew, arrives at the Solana and causes trouble with his sense of humour. Later that night whilst singing "I'm Gonna Be (500 Miles)", Wink is electrocuted and killed during karaoke after touching the microphone with his homemade "electric handshake" joke toy still attached to his hand.

== Production ==
Benidorm returned for an hour-long special on 31 May 2009, serving as a bridge between the second and third series after the former was left on a cliff hanger. The third series was confirmed to be broadcasting that same year, in a new 45-minute episode format.

Sheridan Smith joined the cast in the role of Brandy, a loud-mouthed Scouser introduced as a love interest for established character Martin. Weedon Emily Atack had been on standby to take over the role in the event of Smith being unavailable for filming. Series 3 also saw Tim Healy make his first appearance as Les/Lesley Conroy, originally a transvestite blind date for Geoff, who would go on to establish himself as a series regular. Healy reflected on being recruited by Litten for the programme after they met at the TV Quick Awards in 2007: "Derren was in the bar afterwards so I shook his hand and said, 'Well done, man, it's really funny.' I said, 'I'd love to do one.' So he said, 'What would you like to play?' By this time I'd had a few beers so I said, 'Something people would never expect me to play… I tell you what, a transvestite that kills somebody! Anyway six months later a script arrived and I did that one scene with Johnny Vegas [a hilarious blind date] and they asked me to come back and be a regular. So it was me own fault."

Other notable guest stars throughout the third series included Robin Askwith playing Gary Snelling, a conman and a thief who was revealed as Brandy's lover, and Una Stubbs, who made an appearance in the final episode as Martin's overbearing mother Diana.

== Home media ==
The summer special that preceded the third series was released on DVD in the United Kingdom on 1 June 2009. The third series was released on DVD on 9 November 2009. The DVD release is a 2-disc set which includes deleted scenes and audio commentaries.

The third series first became available for streaming through Netflix in the United Kingdom on 1 October 2015.
