= List of Benidorm characters =

Characters of the ITV sitcom drama Benidorm

This is a list of cast members and characters from the British sitcom Benidorm, which aired from 2007 to 2018.

== Overview ==
Character	Actor	Series									
Character	Actor	1	2	3	4	5	6	7	8	9	10
Main
Mateo Castellanos	Jake Canuso	Main	Main	Main	Main	Main	Main	Main	Main	Main	Main
Jacqueline Stewart	Janine Duvitski	Main	Main	Main	Main	Main	Main	Main	Main	Main	Main
Madge Harvey	Sheila Reid	Main	Main	Main	Main	Main	Main	Recurring	Guest		
Mick Garvey	Steve Pemberton	Main	Main	Main	Main	Main	Main	Recurring			
Janice Garvey	Siobhan Finneran	Main	Main	Main	Main	Main	Main	Recurring			
Michael Garvey	Oliver Stokes	Main	Main	Main	Main	Main	Main	Recurring			
Donald Stewart	Kenny Ireland	Main	Main	Main	Main	Main	Main				
Noreen Maltby	Elsie Kelly	Main	Main	Main	Main	Main		Main	Main	Main	Main
Gavin Ramsbottom	Hugh Sachs	Main	Main	Main	Main	Main					
Janey Yorke	Crissy Rock	Main	Main	Main	Main	Guest		Recurring			
Troy Ganatra	Paul Bazely	Main	Main	Main	Guest				Main	Main	
Martin Weedon	Nicholas Burns	Main	Main	Main			Recurring				
Geoff Maltby	Johnny Vegas	Main	Main	Main				Main	Main	Main	
Chantelle Garvey	Hannah Hobley	Main	Main	Main							
Kate Weedon	Abigail Cruttenden	Main	Main	Recurring (Note: Cruttenden is main cast in the summer special.)							
Daniel	Paul Smith	Main									
Kelly	Niky Wardley	Guest	Main (Note: Wardley and Jordan are only credited in the episodes in which they appear.)								
Mel Harvey	Geoffrey Hutchings		Main	Main							
Jack	Elliott Jordan		Main	Guest		Guest	Guest				
Coolio Garvey	Cameron & Paris Jimenez Tobe		Main								
Coolio Garvey	Zane Bainbridge Leon Bainbridge Nathaniel Walker Nicholas Walker			Main							
Les/Lesley Conroy	Tim Healy			Recurring	Main	Main	Main	Main	Main	Main	Main
Kenneth Du Beke	Tony Maudsley				Main	Main	Main	Main	Main	Main	Main
Liam Conroy	Adam Gillen				Main	Main	Main	Main	Guest	Main	Main
Sam Wood	Shelley Longworth				Main	Main				Main	Main
Pauline Maltby	Selina Griffiths				Main				Main	Main	Main
Natalie Jones	Kathryn Drysdale				Main						
Joyce Temple-Savage	Sherrie Hewson					Main	Main	Main	Main	Main	Main
Trudy	Michelle Butterly					Main					
Tiger Dyke	Danny Walters						Main	Main	Main	Main	
Clive Dyke	Perry Benson						Main	Main			
Tonya Dyke	Hannah Waddingham						Main				
Bianca Dyke	Bel Powley						Main				
Glynn Flint	Alan David							Main			
Terri Dawson	Charlotte Eaton							Main			
Eddie Dawson	Bobby Knutt								Main	Main	Main
Billy Dawson	Steve Edge								Main	Main	Main
Sheron Dawson	Julie Graham								Main	Main	Main
Rob Dawson	Josh Bolt								Main	Main	Main
Joey Ellis	Nathan Bryon								Main	Main	Main
Jodie Dawson	Honor Kneafsey								Main	Main	
Amber Platt	Jessica Ellerby								Main		
Loretta Chase	Kate Fitzgerald									Main	Main
Neville	Simon Greenall									Main	
Callum	Julian Moore-Cook										Main
Cyd	Laila Zaidi										Main
Monty Staines	John Challis							Recurring	Recurring	Recurring	Main
Recurring
Susie	Jan Graveson	Recurring									
Shaun Foster-Conley	Himself			Recurring	Recurring						
Brandy	Sheridan Smith			Recurring							
Paco	Kamal Simpson			Recurring							
Sir Henry	Michael Fenton Stevens				Guest	Guest			Guest	Recurring	Recurring
Lucky Kev	Neil Fitzmaurice				Recurring						
Asa Elliott	Himself					Recurring	Recurring				
Carmen	Alba Ortega					Recurring					
Mr Dixon	Ian Lindsay					Recurring					
Mohammed	Dhafer L'Abidine					Recurring					
Cyril Babcock	Matthew Kelly					Guest	Recurring				
Norman the Doorman	Louis Emerick						Recurring		Guest		
Elena	Holly Earl						Recurring				
Buck A. Roo	Leslie Jordan							Recurring			
Psychic Sue	Amanda Barrie							Recurring		Guest	
Annie Redmond	Alice Barlow							Recurring			
Ionella	Milanka Brooks							Recurring	Guest		
Melanie O'Mara	Nadia Sawalha							Recurring			
Mr Wu	Paul Chan							Guest	Guest	Recurring	Recurring
Sammy Valentino	Shane Richie								Guest		Recurring
Motown Jonathan	Jonathan Hawkins									Recurring	
Malcolm Barrett	Mark Heap									Recurring	Guest
Stanley Keen	Nigel Havers									Guest	Recurring
Vladimir	Antonio de la Cruz										Recurring
Nigel	Norman Pace										Recurring
Dennis	Gareth Hale										Recurring
Franco	Gary Oliver										Recurring
Guest
Sticky Vicky	Herself			Guest							
Gary Snelling	Robin Askwith			Guest					Guest		
Crystal Hennessy-Vass	Joan Collins						Guest	Guest	Guest	Guest	
Jason Gallagher	Philip Olivier						Guest	Guest			
Bean	David O'Reilly									Guest	Guest

== Main characters ==
=== Introduced in series 1 ===
- Troy Ganatra (Paul Bazely, series 1–3, 8–9; guest, series 4) is married to Gavin and a frequent holidaymaker at the Solana. After a one-night stand with Mateo, Troy proves his commitment to Gavin by proposing. Troy reveals that he is the father of a young adult named Jamie from a previous relationship before he came out as gay, with Gavin supporting him and suggesting to invite Jamie to join them on their holiday. Troy later discovers that his estranged father is dying and remains home to support him, whilst Gavin takes their annual holiday to Benidorm with Kenneth Du Beke taking Troy's place. Troy returns and reveals his father left his entire estate to him in his will, making them wealthy as his father was a major property landlord in their local Derby area. This takes a toll on their marriage due to the stress that running the properties has on Troy. Troy returns to Benidorm for Donald Stewart's funeral where he reveals he and Gavin have ended their marriage and he subsequently becomes the owner of the Blow ‘n Go hair salon situated in the Solana, causing friction with head stylist Kenneth over his authority. Troy later sells the salon to Jacqueline.
- Martin Weedon (Nicholas Burns, series 1–3; recurring, series 6) is the socially awkward, anxious husband of Kate. Desperate to be respected and admired by his wife, he is repeatedly undermined by his own bad decisions in his attempts to save his marriage. His discovery of Kate's infidelity triggers a breakdown that exposes his vulnerability and begins a long-running feud with Solana barman Mateo, who he defeats in an arm wrestling competition. Despite his separation from Kate, he returns to the Solana with a new holiday companion named Brandy in the third series, where he attempts to step out of his comfort zone and appeal to her working-class, less luxurious lifestyle. After being robbed by Brandy, he attempts to reconcile with Kate, which is unsuccessful, whereas his distant relationship with his self-absorbed mother is also explored. He returns home attempting to rebuild himself after the conclusion of his marriage, with his pride and poor judgement having continued to sabotage him throughout their separation period. He briefly returns in the sixth series as a member of his friend's stag party, where they cause chaos around the Solana pool area and bribe staff to allow their behaviour through financial gain. He has a one-night stand with the much younger, glamorous Bianca Dyke though a subsequent date is unsuccessful as his attempts to impress her are thwarted. In a rare form of luck, he manages to win big in a casino, marking his final appearance.

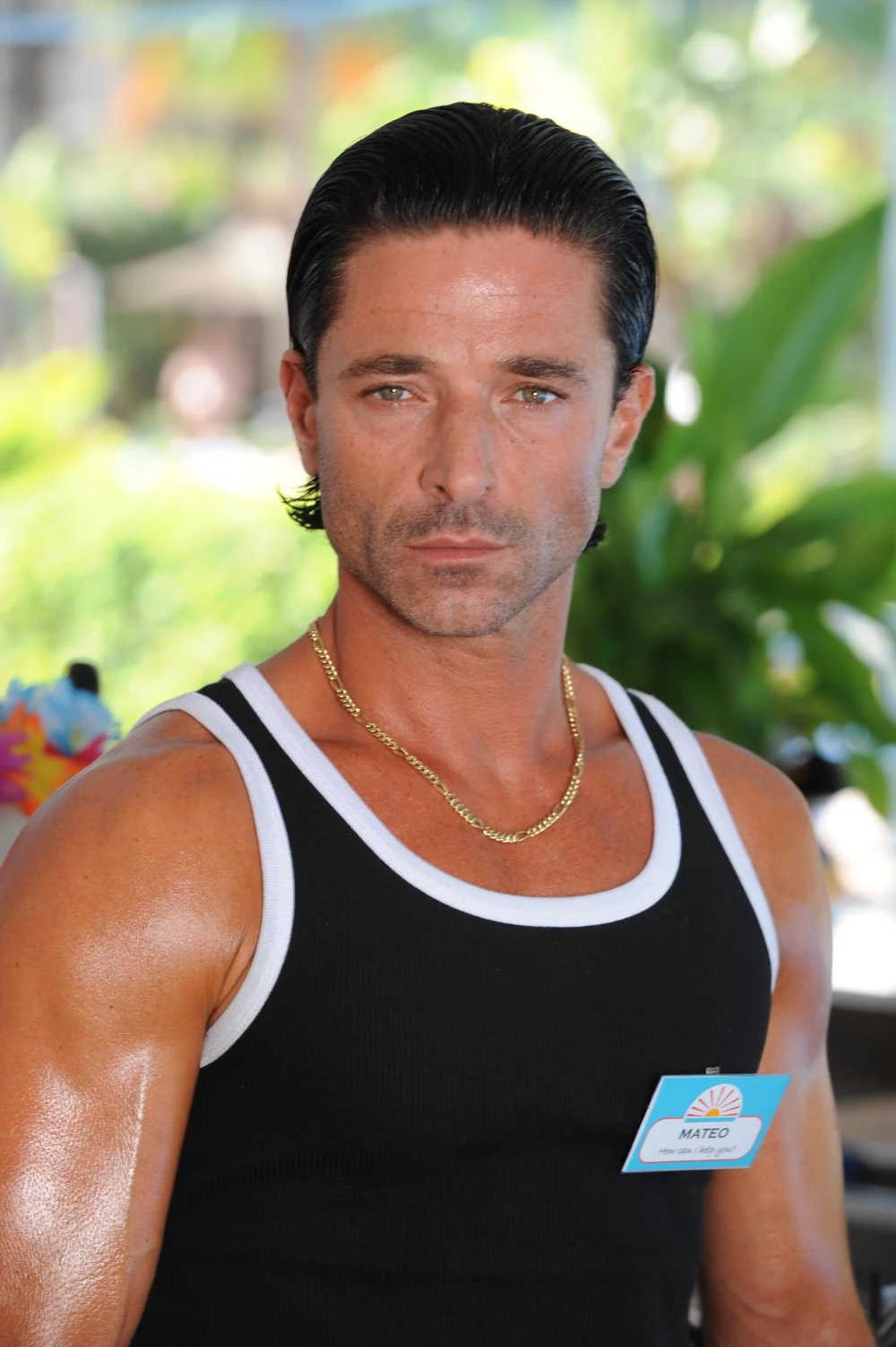
Mateo Castellanos

- Mateo Castellanos (Jake Canuso, series 1–10) is a long-serving employee at the Solana resort, working primarily as a barman and waiter. He remained a member of the main cast throughout the entire series' run and became the longest-serving character, appearing in all 74 episodes. He is portrayed as a womaniser who frequently engages in relationships with guests, including married woman Kate Weedon, Brandy, Natalie Jones and Terri Dawson. His character is often involved in comedic storylines relating to his romantic pursuits and interactions with other staff and visitors. Mateo briefly leaves Benidorm for a new life in Madrid after the breakdown of his marriage though returns due to the city's cost of living to the delight of Solana employees, where he inherits a fortune from a resident at his former hotel. Discussing the initial role of the Solana staff, with the only other original staff member besides himself being Janey Yorke (Crissy Rock), Canuso stated: "When Benidorm started, it was all about the holiday makers. This series is quite dominant on the staff as well and there's more in the reception, salon and the pool. It's very balanced." Despite portraying a Spaniard, Canuso himself has a natural English accent, having moved to the United Kingdom from Switzerland as a young boy. Considering the audience's perception from his portrayal of Mateo, Canuso reflected, "A lot of the audience mistake me for Spanish. I'm tanned. My hair is dyed darker. I'm good with foreign accents because I was brought up in Switzerland with people speaking German, at home we spoke Italian, and we had French from a very young age." Following the introduction of new Solana manageress Joyce Temple-Savage (Sherrie Hewson), Hewson reflected on the dynamic between her new character and Mateo: "There are scenes in which Joyce is blatantly flirting with him. She gives him the looks that say, 'I know what you think of me and I totally understand. But I'm very experienced, so you'll be in safe hands'. Of course, he's not in love with her – he's terrified of her! It gets very embarrassing, but very funny. She fancies Mateo, though. Who wouldn't? He's too gorgeous for words." Whilst previewing the ninth series, Canuso spoke about Mateo's feud with returning character Sam Wood (Shelley Longworth): "Nobody gets on with her she's a bitch. Mateo and Sam have past history where she thought she was having a little do with Mateo. He dislikes her because she uncovered the whole three kids, Miguel thing, all of that. So the first few episodes are very much about their dislike of each other and she kind of has one over him because she's sort of detached from the hotel." Delving further into the nature of their characters' relationship, Canuso considered the insulting nature between their exchanges: "The other thing is, she talks about throwing something and Mateo says 'The only thing you'd want to do with you is throw you off the roof!' He's so cruel and vile. They are both incredibly thick skinned, his ego is huge. He loves himself so much that you can throw anything at him. I don't know how many times he gets called 'old and leathery skin'. It's like water and oil, whatever! The same with her, he just insults her." Canuso reprised his role of Mateo in Benidorm Live, a major theatre adaption of the programme. Beginning in September 2018, over 200 shows were scheduled to take place in various locations throughout the United Kingdom and Ireland. Reflecting on the show's transition to stage, Canuso stated, "We did it live at the Royal Variety and we were nervous because we weren't used to that interaction with a live audience. But as soon as the theme music came on there was a roar from the audience, followed by cheers and laughter, and we knew we'd got it right. The live show takes it all to another level, but it still has the pathos and warmth within the comedy. It's a nod to Fawlty Towers and the Carry Ons, the classic comedies people love all over the world." Industry commentary has noted that the series deliberately relied on heightened stereotypes for comedic effect, with Mateo described in trade coverage as the show's "Spanish bartending Lothario", reflecting how his sexual opportunism became a defining narrative device. During the production of Benidorm, Canuso stated that he, along with other cast members, received heavy attention from fans: "They run down the street chasing you! I was dressed in heels and skirt like Marilyn Monroe and came out of the hotel and there's like 20 people going, 'Oh look, it's Mateo.' Nothing works!" In July 2020, creator Derren Litten opened a bar in Benidorm named Mateo's, named in recognition of the character. The bar itself features real-life props from the set of Benidorm.
- Kate Weedon (Abigail Cruttenden, series 1–2; recurring, series 3) is a tightly wound and middle-class holidaymaker who is infuriated at her husband Martin's booking of the Solana for their summer holiday and quickly grows disgusted at the chaos around her throughout her stays at the hotel. Intelligent, sarcastic and emotionally restless, Kate is dissatisfied in her marriage to Martin and is desperate to become a mother, something which is delicate in her marriage as Martin is infertile. She has a one-night stand with barman Mateo during the first series, which sparks her eventual transformation into a more impulsive, self-aware character, which contrasts sharply to Martin's stagnation. Her marriage to Martin breaks down off-screen after the second series and they separate. She briefly returns during the third series after Martin is robbed and helps him to secure a passport to return home though she rejects his suggestion of reconciliation as she has begun a new relationship.
- Jacqueline Stewart (Janine Duvitski, series 1–10) is married to Donald and travels regularly to Benidorm with him. She is portrayed as unintelligent, gormless and uneducated though displays characteristics of a compassionate nature. Alongside Donald, she is very open about her sex life as a swinger, making other guests feel uncomfortable and both are often ridiculed. After Donald's death, she finds comfort from the support of her friends and eventually permanently relocates to Benidorm. After gaining a wealthy inheritance from a friend, she buys the Blow ‘n Go salon within the Solana and is last seen organising a date with fellow swinger Ron Pickford.
- Janice Garvey (Siobhan Finneran, series 1–6; recurring, series 7) is the sensible counterbalance to her husband Mick, displaying traits of being practical, warm and fiercely maternal. She often acts as the emotional glue holding her chaotic family together. Janice is long-suffering but assertive, regularly calling out Mick's selfishness while still being deeply in love with him. She provides stability for her children, particularly Chantelle, whose rebellion and teenage pregnancy worries her. Her recurring storylines focus on family loyalty, financial stress and marital compromise. She leaves in the seventh series with the rest of her family as they move to Las Vegas amidst the revelation of Madge's multi-million pound fortune of a luxury hotel.
- Chantelle Garvey (Hannah Hobley, series 1–3) is the teenage daughter of Mick and Janice Garvey. She is discovered to be pregnant on her family's first visit to Benidorm and begins to embrace motherhood throughout her tenure for her son Coolio. Despite multiple hurdles, she enters a relationship with Geoff Maltby, which leads to greater emotional maturity, culminating in her moving out of her family home to gain independence living with Geoff. Off-screen, she gives birth to Geoff's son Pythagoras but the couple eventually separate.
- Donald Stewart (Kenny Ireland, series 1–6) is a regular guest at the Solana with his wife Jacqueline, known for his outspoken and often politically incorrect views. A swinger, he shares an open relationship with his wife and his openness about their sexuality often makes other holidaymakers feel uncomfortable. Donald fakes his death by staging a suicide on the beach for an insurance payout though is ultimately caught out by the police and serves a custodial sentence. He uses this experience to frighten other guests at the Solana, including Gavin Ramsbottom and Kenneth Du Beke, for comedic effect, which frustrates Jacqueline. Donald dies off-screen and Jacqueline, Kenneth and Troy Ramsbottom scatter his ashes in Benidorm.
- Noreen Maltby (Elsie Kelly, series 1–5, 7–10) is a kind-hearted, oblivious mother who frequently holidays with her adolescent son Geoff. Her intrusive, though innocent, behaviour often embarrasses Geoff, who publicly claims that she is his personal assistant, ashamed to be on holiday with his mother as an adult. After Geoff moves out of her home and starts a new life elsewhere, she holidays with her alcoholic daughter Pauline, with Noreen's personality traits quickly confusing and angering her daughter in a similar fashion. Noreen attempts to build friendships with other regular holidaymakers and spends one year vacating solely, which she admits was a mistake. Her later storylines include the revelation that Geoff was adopted, which brings mother and son closer together, and dealing with Pauline's repetitive relapses from her alcohol addiction.
- Mick Garvey (Steve Pemberton, series 1–6; recurring, series 7) is the loud, flirtatious patriarch of the Garvey family, happiest with a beer in hand and on a cheap holiday deal. He frequently clashes with his impulsive mother-in-law Madge though comes to support her during difficult periods. He has a strong marriage to his wife Janice, despite their recurring arguments over his tightness when it comes to money. He takes over the artificial tanning business empire that belonged to his father-in-law Mel Harvey, though his incompetence and disobedience results in the business burning to the ground and leaving the family penniless after he failed to pay for the insurance beforehand. He leaves alongside the rest of his family for a new life in Las Vegas after it is discovered that Madge is the rightful owner of a hotel there.
- Gavin Ramsbottom (Hugh Sachs, series 1–5) is a holidaymaker who frequents the Solana with his husband Troy and is characterised by his flamboyant and snobbish personality and expressive behaviour. A hairdresser by trade, his storylines frequently centre on his relationship with Troy, including issues of trust and commitment, as their relationship is compromised by Troy's infidelity with Mateo, Troy's hidden fatherhood and Gavin's infidelity with a young barman named Emilio. Off-screen, Gavin and Troy decide to end their marriage and Gavin is last mentioned by Kenneth Du Beke who explains that Gavin is travelling in Venice alone.
- Daniel (Paul Smith, series 1), a member of the hotel staff.
- Michael Garvey (Oliver Stokes, series 1–6; recurring, series 7) is the young son of Mick and Janice Garvey. He is depicted as intelligent and observant, often acting more mature than his age in contrast to his parents’ behaviour. Michael frequently comments on the situations around him with dry humour. As the series progresses, he grows more independent and becomes involved in typical adolescent experiences. He appears regularly during the early series as part of the Garvey family's storylines.
- Madge Harvey (Sheila Reid, series 1–6; recurring, series 7; guest, series 8) is the abrasive, wheelchair-using matriarch of the Garvey family. She is known for her heavy smoking, blunt manner and frequent use of insults, particularly at the expense of her family members. Despite her harsh personality, Madge demonstrates loyalty to her family and is often involved in their affairs. Madge finds love with self-made millionaire Mel Harvey and marries him in Benidorm though is left widowed when he dies off-screen on Christmas Day. They briefly move to Benidorm to take over the Benidorm Palace entertainment venue though Mel's poor investments leaves Madge penniless. She pursues another short-lived business venture by taking over the lease of a bar in Benidorm, which she names in Mel's honour, though loses control of the bar and returns home to the UK. She continues to visit Benidorm on holiday with her family, where she discovers that Mel's ancestors own land in Las Vegas, resulting in them taking over a luxury hotel and leaving Benidorm for a new life. She returns for an auction to buy her grandson Michael a holiday home where she teams up with Solana manageress Joyce Temple-Savage for financial gain.
- Janey York (Crissy Rock, series 1–4; recurring, series 7; guest, series 5) is the first manageress of the Solana resort. She is depicted as professional and authoritative, though often frustrated by the behaviour of guests and staff. Janey frequently clashes with Mateo due to his unprofessional conduct. Her storylines involve managing the day-to-day operations of the hotel and dealing with various crises. She later leaves her managerial role for a new hotel in Altea though briefly returns in an attempt to sabotage her successor Joyce Temple-Savage's management, where she admits that she misses Benidorm. She returns once again, resuming her position as the Solana manageress as part of staff cut-backs but leaves with her nephew Jason after intercepting a prestigious employment opportunity for Joyce.
- Geoff Maltby (Johnny Vegas, series 1–3, 7–9) is the insecure, socially awkward son of Noreen. A competitive pub quiz champion, he nicknames himself “The Oracle” and attempts to impress other holidaymakers with his general knowledge and frequently lies to gain the attention of others. He is embarrassed of his overbearing mother and is often ridiculed as a result of her innocent actions. He develops a relationship with Chantelle Garvey, which enhances his emotional maturity, and they decide to move in together after the third series, going on to have a son. He returns in the seventh series with his mother, where he reveals he and Chantelle have separated and has a short-lived engagement to Ionella, which ends after his lies of wealth and luxury are exposed. He gradually becomes closer and more patient with his mother after it is revealed that he was adopted. His later storylines focus on his concerns for his sister Pauline, attempting to help her during her relapses with alcoholism and tries to end her controlling romantic relationship.

=== Introduced in series 2 ===
- Mel Harvey (Geoffrey Hutchings, series 2–3) is the second husband of Madge Harvey. He is portrayed as a loud, brash and often boastful businessman who asserts his position as successful from his previous business ventures that saw him become a multi-millionaire, though his subsequent ventures are typically exaggerated or short-lived. Mel is characterised by his quick temper, impatience and tendency to assert authority, often clashing with members of his extended family. His attempts at business leadership are frequently undermined by poor judgement and lack of organisation, leading to various problems for both his staff and other Solana guests. Despite this, he remains a dominant presence within the Garvey family dynamic, often attempting to take control of situations. Mel's relationship with Madge is portrayed as volatile but longstanding, with both characters displaying similarly blunt and confrontational personalities. His presence adds to the broader family tensions depicted in the series. Despite taking over the Benidorm Palace entertainment venue, Mel dies off-screen on Christmas Day, leaving Madge a penniless widow. Madge subsequently vows to make Mel proud to honour him after his death.
- Kelly (Niky Wardley, series 2, guest series 1), a holidaymaker who is romantically involved with Mateo.
- Jack (Elliott Jordan, series 2, guest series 3, 5−6), a young barman who seduces Janice Garvey. He follows Janice to the Solana, where they kiss again. He interrupts the wedding of Mel and Madge Harvey, claiming his love for Janice. Years later, he returns as the new flatmate of Liam Conroy. Janice is furious to see him and he claims not to know her. After being rude to Sam Wood and Trudy, Liam evicts Jack from his flat and is hit over the head with a bottle by Trudy when he refuses to give Liam his keys back. He later appears at the beach, frightening Tiger Dyke with a fake shark fin. When Tiger confronts him, he attacks Tiger and is then punched by Michael Garvey.

=== Introduced in series 4 ===
- Les/Lesley Conroy (Tim Healy, series 4–10; recurring, series 3) is the crossdressing bartender of the Solana resort. He initially appears as a date for Geoff Maltby, frightening Geoff due to his hidden identity as a crossdresser. He briefly works for Mel and Madge Harvey at the Benidorm Palace but finds work at the Solana after Mel's death. Despite threatening colleague Mateo Castellanos due to his strong work ethic, the pair develop a supportive friendship after Les prevents Mateo from being dismissed. Les shows a loving relationship with his son Liam, displaying compassion and sympathy as he guides his son through life choices. Les remains a loyal, supportive member of staff at the Solana. However, he flees after an arrest warrant is released due to his tax evasion in the UK, leaving Liam devastated.
- Liam Conroy (Adam Gillen, series 4–7, 9–10; guest, series 8) is the immature, irresponsible son of Les Conroy. He is introduced as visiting his father whilst he is working at the Solana though decides to remain in Benidorm to be closer to Les, gaining employment as the Solana's handyman. Liam has unrequited love affairs with Solana guests Natalie Jones and Bianca Dyke, leaving him questioning his masculinity. After showing an interest in beauty, Liam becomes a hairdresser at Blow ‘n Go, where he develops a strong friendship with Kenneth Du Beke. Liam leaves to work in Madrid but later returns to Benidorm to the delight of Les and Kenneth. Liam later decides to return to the UK to support his father through his court battle over tax evasion.
- Sam Wood (Shelley Longworth, series 4–5, 9–10) is introduced as a lively and outspoken holidaymaker, vacating with two different friends, Natalie Jones and Trudy. She breaks her leg after a drunken night out in Benidorm, causing her to become infuriated and insecure. A similar chain of events follows the next year when she breaks her arm on the Solana dancefloor. Sam returns years later as the new holiday rep of a company owned by the Solana Group, BeniGo Travel. She clashes with other Solana staff, notably Mateo, as a result of her money-making schemes and smug persona. However, she gradually develops a loyal stance for the Solana, building friendships with once-rival staff.
- Kenneth Du Beke (Tony Maudsley, series 4–10) is the flamboyant manager of the Blow ‘n Go salon at the Solana. He is characterised by his dramatic personality, sharp wit and displays of immaturity. Kenneth often displays a temperamental and demanding attitude, particularly towards his employees, but also shows moments of loyalty and affection. He initially comes to Benidorm as a holidaymaker, keeping his employer Gavin Ramsbottom company in place of his husband Troy. He later decides to remain in Benidorm to set up his own salon within the Solana. His friendship with Liam Conroy becomes a significant storyline, with the two forming a close personal and professional partnership.
- Natalie Jones (Katherine Drysdale, series 4) is the holiday companion of Sam Wood. She is shown to be the more patient and caring of the duo. Having previously engaged in a short-lived love affair with Mateo Castellanos, Mateo attempts to reignite their passion to no avail. She shuts down Liam Conroy's advances and later decides against pursuing any further relationships.
- Pauline Maltby (Selina Griffiths, series 4, 8–10) is the sister of Geoff Maltby and daughter of Noreen Maltby. She is portrayed as socially awkward, intense and emotionally volatile, often displaying obsessive behaviour. A recovering alcoholic, Pauline's interactions with others are frequently uncomfortable, particularly due to her difficulty understanding social boundaries. Her presence creates tension within her family, especially with Noreen and Geoff. Pauline first stays at the Solana with her mother in the midst of her divorce from a Saudi Arabian, where she struggles with the divorce proceedings and risk of her husband taking her life savings. This culminates in her relapse into alcoholism, causing friction with Noreen, though is relieved when her husband does not show up in court, leaving her financially stable. Pauline eventually quits her job and decides to pursue a career in writing, where she writes erotic fiction whilst intoxicated. To her surprise, she is offered a book deal and finally pursues her dreams of becoming an author.

=== Introduced in series 5 ===
- Joyce Temple-Savage (Sherrie Hewson, series 5–10) is the second manageress of the Solana. Upon her arrival, she instantly clashes with her staff as her ambitions of upgrading the Solana to a four-star hotel results in her imposing a strict policy. Joyce claims she has much experience in the hotel industry, including having worked under Richard Branson. She fell for head barman Mateo Castellanos after he pretended he was falling in love with her after she overheard him rudely complaining about her. Her past is uncovered over the course of the series; she reignited an old relationship with dance teacher Cyril Babcock, until he had to leave the Solana after giving guests food poisoning. She often feuded with Kenneth Du Beke over his laziness, often threatening to have his salon Blow 'n' Go removed from the premises. In an extreme circumstance, the pair have a physical altercation, resulting in Joyce breaking his teeth. Despite their differences, they maintained a supportive relationship as both wanted the best for their respective organisations. Joyce has an off-relationship with Monty Staines, culminating in them marrying in the tenth series, though their marriage is often thwarted due to his incompetence and mismanagement of the Solana entertainment budget.
- Trudy (Michelle Butterly, series 5) is the friend of Sam Wood who accompanies her on their holiday to Benidorm. Originating from Liverpool, she shows her no-nonsense attitude immediately when she headbutts Liam Conroy when he makes an unrequited pass at her. Trudy shows an interest in Liam's new flatmate Jack, stepping in when Janice Garvey confronts him leading Janice to grab Trudy by her throat. At the dance competition, when Liam confronts Jack, Trudy smashes a bottle over Jack's before they put Jack in a dustbin. Trudy accepts a challenge from Sam to act more feminine though this is long-lived as Victor mistreats Trudy and mistakes her for a prostitute, leading her to react with violence. Trudy plays a cruel trick on Sam after spotting her snogging Liam, telling her that she has had unprotected sex with Liam. Sam then reveals that she is pregnant to Trudy and Liam, leaving the pair shocked. When Liam and Trudy confess at Neptune's Bar, Sam reveals that she got a pregnant woman to do her pregnancy test, making it seem like she was pregnant.

=== Introduced in series 6 ===
- Clive Dyke (Perry Benson, series 6–7) is the short-tempered patriarch of the Dyke family, coming to Benidorm expecting the Solana to be a four star hotel, though is shocked to discover its low-budget facilities. Despite threatening to leave, they end up staying when Joyce Temple-Savage offers him an 80% discount on the holiday. His wife Tonya is annoyed when he keeps helping Janice Garvey, whose husband Mick has been detained at Alicante Airport over potential drug smuggling charges. When his son Tiger and Janice's son Michael get into trouble, it causes tension between the Garveys and Dykes. Clive returns a year later when Tiger is robbed by his holiday companion. He reveals he has split up with Tonya and makes the most of being single, trying his luck with several holidaymakers, which embarrasses Tiger. Clive's sister Terri Dawson joins them on their holiday, angering Clive, who has been staying with her after his separation. Clive heads into town in search of a dongle for the internet and comes across former classmate Melanie, now a holiday home saleswoman. She lures Clive into visiting a development, where Clive meets Monty Staines and is swindled out of €5,000. Terri and Tiger come up with a plan to help him get his money back by pretending Tiger is a German footballer who wants to buy all 4 houses, allowing Clive to regain his money.
- Tonya Dyke (Hannah Waddingham, series 6) is the confrontational, arrogant wife of Clive and mother of Tiger and Bianca. Tonya is sweet and protective of her children, but annoys and hurries her husband Clive about. She regularly talks to her children like toddlers, even though they are grown up. Tonya is untrusting towards Clive, accusing him of flirting with Janice Garvey when he attempts to help her when her husband Mick is accused of smuggling drugs through customs. Tonya has a talent for singing and she wins a singing competition at the Solana. She invites Janice to a spa, however her card is declined, resulting in Janice paying for them both, despite Tonya insisting it was her intentions to pay the bill. This makes things worse between the two families, however they apologise to each other over drinks.
- Tiger Dyke (Danny Walters, series 6–9) is the son of Clive and Tonya, initially visiting Benidorm on holiday with his family. Tiger befriends fellow holidaymaker Michael Garvey and they get up to mischief together, including Michael getting drunk and getting a tattoo. Tiger returns a year later with his friend Zach, who steals his money and leaves him deserted. He is later joined by Clive and his aunt Terri, who fly out after learning of his isolation. Tiger develops a brief romance with singer Annie, performing on karaoke together and kissing on the final night of his holiday. Tiger continues to frequently visit Benidorm, accompanied by his dumb-witted friend Joey. He is forced into the sensible role of the duo as Joey isn't the smartest of the crop and often gets them into trouble through his antics. Inadvertently, Tiger drunkenly encounters pensioner Loretta Chase in a nightclub and it is suggested that they may have slept together until Tiger remembers that Loretta only comforted him in his room before he fell asleep.
- Bianca Dyke (Bel Powley, series 6) is the loud, party-girl daughter of Clive and Tonya. Bianca arrives in Benidorm a day after her family, having been holidaying in the Maldives with her boyfriend Hugo, but they split up whilst they were there. Bianca catches the eye of various members of staff and holidaymakers. Liam Conroy, in particular, develops a crush on her however she ends up going on a date with Martin Weedon. She jokes about being underage after they sleep together, worrying an innocent Martin, though she reveals the truth before an ill-fated casino visit sees her leave him on his own. Barman Mateo Castellanos is also attracted to Bianca though his inappropriate flirting with her leaves Bianca disgusted and demanding he is fired

=== Introduced in series 7 ===
- Glynn Flint (Alan David, series 7) arrives at the Solana Resort on a holiday wife swap with Jacqueline Stewart whilst her husband Donald Stewart was on holiday with Glynn's wife Rhiannon. Jacqueline and Glynn have a personality clash as Glynn is an old romantic so does not approve of Jacqueline being a swinger. Although Glynn is not keen on the wife swap, he is still determined to enjoy his holiday and tries to convince Jacqueline to do more than sunbathing. He takes her out for a game of pelota; when one of the players gets injured, Jacqueline finds herself subbed on and reveals a hidden talent. A keen singer, he wants Jacqueline to join him on karaoke and arranges a singing lesson for them both though Jacqueline is hopeless. He is later reunited with Rhiannon where they reveal to one another that they made a mistake and embrace.
- Terri Dawson (Charlotte Eaton, series 7) is the sister of Clive Dyke, who stays with her after his separation from his wife Tonya, and joins him and her nephew Tiger on holiday. Terri gets caught in the crossfire of an argument between Joyce Temple-Savage and Mateo which ends up with Terri accidentally being knocked out by a lemon thrown by Mateo. When she awakes, she finds herself attracted to Mateo, however when she finds out it was him who knocked her out with a lemon she threatens to sue him. In the end, she blackmails him to have sex with her instead. Terri also wins a free makeover from Blow 'n Go. After the makeover she catches Geoff Maltby's eye. When Clive is swindled out of €5,000 by Monty Staines, Terri and Tiger come up with a plan to help him get his money back.

=== Introduced in series 8 ===
- Eddie Dawson (Bobby Knutt, series 8–10) is the recently divorced father of Billy Dawson. His selfishness and lack of tact are as plain to see as the loudly patterned and coloured Hawaiian-type shirts he regularly wears. Eddie's behaviour angers his daughter-in-law Sheron, particularly when he nudges granddaughter Jodie in the pool as a form of teaching her how to swim. Billy promises Eddie that he can move into their family home after their holiday, without Sheron's knowledge, who is completely against the idea. He develops an attraction to widow Jacqueline Stewart and later extends his holiday to accompany her. Eddie later moves in with his family after agreeing to fund Jodie's stage school fees. He clashes with Sheron's mother Loretta Chase and their altercations lead to friction on their family holiday.
- Billy Dawson (Steve Edge, series 8–10) is the patriarch of the Dawson family. He has a romantic marriage with his wife Sheron and often attempts to maintain peace during family arguments, particularly between Eddie, Sheron and Loretta. He and Sheron attempt to keep their marriage alive, trying a role-playing activity to fulfil Sheron's fantasies. After an encounter with Uri Geller, Billy maintains an overly positive outlook on life, infuriating his family. However, it is short-lived after Eddie's clumsiness leads to an expensive bill heading Billy's way. A fan of Frankie Goes to Hollywood, Billy meets his idol Holly Johnson at Alicante Airport during a baggage handler strike, where he offers Holly his ticket.
- Sheron Dawson (Julie Graham, series 8–10) is married to Billy and mother of Rob and Jodie. She has a short temper and is not amused by the inane ramblings and less than diplomatic demeanour of Billy's father Eddie. She is loving and supportive towards her children, praising the success of both Rob and Jodie. Particularly, she is optimistic for Jodie to fulfil her ambitions of attending stage school to pursue a career in the public eye, overviewing their family finances in an attempt to ensure Jodie can attend. Sheron tries to make Rob's girlfriend Cyd feel comfortable when they join the family on holiday and is infuriated by Eddie and Loretta's attitudes towards her.
- Rob Dawson (Josh Bolt, series 8–10) is the son and eldest child of Billy and Sheron. A university student, he was into books until he slowly began to change his mind over his future prospects. His kind-hearted attitude attracts Solana barmaid Amber Platt and they have a date together. He befriended Tiger Dyke and Joey Ellis with the trio often drinking together in Benidorm. During a gap year, Rob met a girl named Cyd, who the Dawsons were convinced was a boy over his messages. The Dawsons clashed when they were being rather strange and unkind when the couple were around. Rob also later proposed to Cyd and they left to holiday in Paris after she accepts.
- Jodie Dawson (Honor Kneafsey, series 8–9) is the daughter and youngest child of Billy and Sheron. She irritates her grandfather Eddie when she showcases her acting abilities. Jodie applies to attend a fee-paying stage school to pursue her employment ambitions, which causes tension between her parents over their financial situation.
- Amber Platt (Jessica Ellerby, series 8) is a barmaid at the Solana. After a day-long trial, she begins working full-time after Les Conroy insists to manageress Joyce Temple-Savage that she is the perfect candidate for the job. Her beauty attracts holidaymakers Tiger Dyke and Joey Ellis, as well as her colleague Mateo Castellanos, all of whom try to win her affections to no avail. She becomes attracted to Rob Dawson and they go on a date.
- Joey Ellis (Nathan Bryon, series 8–10) is a friend of Tiger Dyke who accompanies him on holiday. Tiger reveals to Rob Dawson that they know each other through playing football together once a week. Having barely known each other before their holiday, they get to know each other very well over their stay. Joey is extremely stupid and slow although he is extremely gifted when it comes to mathematics. After an attraction develops, he sleeps with Sam Wood and later begins dating her but breaks things off just as she is keen to take the relationship to another level.

=== Introduced in series 9 ===
- Loretta Chase (Kate Fitzgerald, series 9–10) is the mother of Sheron Dawson. Sheron announced to her family that her mother was coming to Benidorm to visit them, much to the disappointment of the entire family. Loretta first appeared when Tiger Dyke and Joey Ellis arrived in a nightclub in Benidorm, where Joey encountered Loretta in a darkened area of the bar and introduced her to Tiger. Although reluctant at first, Tiger gets drunk and starts to dance with Loretta. Rob arrives late, having escaped a family dinner at the Solana, and is horrified to discover Tiger groping the woman he shakily declares to the boys his own grandmother. The next morning, while Rob was hungover in the room, Billy went to visit him and saw Loretta sneaking out of Tiger's room down the corridor. It is suspected that the pair slept together though it was revealed through Tiger's flashbacks that he didn't sleep with Loretta and that she took him to his room and the two fell almost unconscious there. Loretta clashes with Sheron's father-in-law Eddie, often throwing insults at him. Loretta is suspicious of Rob's new girlfriend Cyd and believes she is a gold digger. She infuriates Sheron by her poor treatment and rudeness towards Cyd.
- Neville (Simon Greenall, series 9) is a friend of Les Conroy who works at The Geordie Bar in Benidorm. He agrees to cover for Les as he briefly returns to the UK. Neville poses as a psychiatric medium for Sam Wood during a psychiatric convention at the Solana. Neville is a keen Newcastle United supporter and is infuriated when Sam teases men over their love for football.

=== Introduced in series 10 ===
- Monty Staines (John Challis, series 10; recurring, series 7–9) is originally introduced as a scam artist, conning Clive Dyke out of €5,000 for the purpose of owning his own holiday home. He convinces Clive, a builder, to invest in his supposed housing development, only for Clive to discover that he does not legally own the land it is built on. Having found a slightly more honest line of work, he takes a shine to hotel managereress Joyce Temple-Savage. They engage in an on-off relationship and, eventually, they marry. When he struggles with employment, he has a brief stint as the Solana's entertainments manager, which ends disastrously as he becomes the manager of mentally unstable Sammy Valentino. This unfortunate business decision jeopardises his relationship with Joyce and he considers returning to work in the United Kingdom. However, they reconcile and decide to work on their marriage.
- Callum Byrne (Julian Moore-Cook, series 10) accompanies Joey Ellis on holiday, taking the place of Tiger Dyke when he is unable to go. Callum is emotional as he first sees the pool area, later revealing to Joey that it is his first holiday abroad as his family did not have much money growing up. He often offends the way that Sam Wood looks and ridicules her weight. This angers Joey and Callum admits that he was overweight in school and was bullied as a result, causing him to mock Sam as a form of retribution.
- Cyd (Laila Zaidi, series 10) is introduced as Rob Dawson's girlfriend from South America. His grandmother Loretta Chase is suspicious of her, accusing her of being a "gold digger". When her father arrives, he initially disproves of her relationship with Rob and asserts that they will be returning to their country. Rob gets to the airport and catches them just before they leave and he proposes to Cyd in front of her father. She accepts, having previously rejected his proposal, and her father finally approves of Rob. He then sends them on his private jet to Paris.

== Recurring and guest characters ==
=== Introduced in series 1 ===
- Susie (Jan Graveson, series 1), a holidaymaker staying at the hotel.

=== Introduced in series 2 ===
- Sylvia (Wendy Richard, series 2), the short-tempered mother of Kelly. She feuds with Madge Harvey, who believes that Sylvia has kissed her fiancé Mel. Their confrontation results in Madge throwing her in the swimming pool. Sylvia was removed from the hotel, despite being the victim, due to the fact the Madge was staying with her family and therefore paying more money.
- Dorothy (Margi Clarke, series 2), the mother of Gavin Ramsbottom. She arrives, awkwardly kissing Martin Weedon to avoid an interaction with Mateo Castellanos as she did not have a hotel wristband. It emerges that Dorothy was young when she gave birth to Gavin and they possessed a "more brother and sister" relationship, according to Troy Ramsbottom. She leaves unexpectedly, upsetting Gavin, and Troy reveals that she has commitment issues, which has regularly strained their relationship.

=== Introduced in series 3 ===
- Brandy (Sheridan Smith, series 3) is the holiday companion of Martin Weedon after the breakdown of his marriage to his wife Kate. Originating from Liverpool, her working-class background contrasts with Martin's prestigious upbringing and their personalities often clash. She has a one-night stand with Mateo where it emerges she is planning to rob Martin and other Solana guests. She makes Martin believe that a relationship is on the cards to gain his trust before fleecing him and fleeing with her partner Gary. Off-screen, Brandy and Gary are caught by the police for their crimes.
- Sticky Vicky (herself, series 3)
- Shaun Foster-Conley (himself, series 3−4)
- Gary Snelling (Robin Askwith, series 3, 8), a con man and thief who is revealed to be the secret lover and accomplice of Brandy. After Brandy steals a pass key from Mateo Castellanos, they use this to gain access to various guests' rooms to steal their belongings. When Brandy is caught by Troy Ramsbottom, they attack him and tie him to a hot water pipe. He returns years later, looking for work at the Solana. He gains the attraction of manageress Joyce Temple-Savage and uses this to his advantage to gain employment. However, he is shown to be uninterested in work and later reveals that he is only looking for proof of employment, angering Joyce who orders him to leave.
- Diana Weedon (Una Stubbs, series 3), the mother of Martin Weedon. Janice Garvey approaches her at the bar, believing her to be an investigator into the recent robberies at the Solana. She later takes Martin and his estranged wife Kate to the hotel where she is staying and it emerges that she does not listen to her son. She attends a Spanish dance club and becomes attracted to Mateo Castellano. Kate forces Martin to leave after Diana refuses to do so. It is revealed that Diana is renowned as "Dirty Diana", suggesting a sexual past, and they sleep together.

=== Introduced in series 4 ===
- Lucky Kev (Neil Fitzmaurice, series 4), a resident of Benidorm caravan park. He retrieves Madge Harvey's belongings before her caravan is towed away. At the Solana, he warns Madge that local gangster Scary Mary is searching for her. After Madge's family fight Scary Mary and her henchmen, he tries to gain a lift back to the caravan park from the Garvey family, which causes Madge to chase after him. He works in a bar that Madge decides to acquire and helps Mick Garvey in redecorating the bar in preparation of the bar's reopening after renovation. He is frequently mentioned by other characters in subsequent series.
- Cilla Black (herself, series 4)
- Scary Mary (Denise Welch, series 4), the wife of the caravan park landlord. She arrives at the Solana looking for Madge though she rebuffs her threats and refuses to give her any money. A physical altercation begins between them until Janice Garvey headbutts Mary, knocking her unconscious.
- Bananarama (themselves, series 4)
- Sir Henry (Michael Fenton Stevens, series 4−5, 8−10), a member of the British consulate.

=== Introduced in series 5 ===
- Asa Elliott (himself, series 5−6)
- Carmen (Alba Ortega, series 5), the daughter of Janey Yorke.
- Mohammed (Dhaffer L'Abidine, series 5), a con man who arrives in search of Madge Harvey. He saves Madge from an organ theft gang and claims to be a former business associate of her late husband Mel, returning his cigarette case and an old photo. Madge agrees to marry Mohammed to avoid legal loopholes concerned with his desire to transfer money to her that belonged to Mel. However, Mick Garvey discovers him to be a con artist who believed Madge to be a wealthy widow and that his stories about Mel and money are untrue.
- Cyril Babcock (Matthew Kelly, series 5−6), a dance instructor and love interest of Joyce Temple-Savage. They first met in the early 1990s when Joyce was a holiday rep and Cyril and his wife were resident dancing instructors. Joyce and Cyril reconnect when he serves as an instructor and judge at a dance competition at the Solana. Joyce subsequently discovers Cyril to be homeless. They rekindle their relationship and she employs him as assistant manager at the Solana. However, after Cyril's money-saving scheme results in multiple guests suffering from food poisoning, Joyce's position at the Solana is put at risk. Cyril leaves a note for Joyce, apologising and he returns to the UK, ending their relationship.

=== Introduced in series 6 ===
- Norman 'the Doorman' Fagin (Louis Emerick, series 6, 8), the assistant of Kenneth's uncle Herbert.
- Elena (Holly Earl, series 6), a local Spanish teenage girl.
- Jason Gallagher (Philip Olivier, series 6−7), a barman who arrives at the Solana looking for employment. His cocktail-making skills impress the guests and manageress Joyce Temple-Savage offers him a trial. He feuds with Mateo Castellanos, who feels threatened by Jason. The manager of another hotel in Benidorm reveals that Jason is a con artist. The police raid the bar and arrest him for selling stolen all-inclusive wristbands, a crime actually committed by teenagers Tiger Dyke and Michael Garvey. Jason returns a year later, where he is revealed to be the nephew of Janey Yorke, who employs him as bar manager. Jason intercepts a letter for Joyce, which is the offer of a managerial position at a prestigious hotel. He convinces Janey to fill the vacancy, claiming to have been behind the work that Joyce has done at the Solana. Jason and Janey then leave for their new roles.
- Crystal Hennessy-Vass (Joan Collins, series 6−9), the CEO of the Solana Leisure Group.

=== Introduced in series 7 ===
- Buck A. Roo (Leslie Jordan, series 7), an American attorney.
- Psychic Sue (Amanda Barrie, series 7, 9), a psychic.
- Annie Redmond (Alice Barlow, series 7), a member of hotel staff.
- Ionella (Milanka Brooks, series 7−8), a gold digger who believes Geoff's lies about being a millionaire.
- Melanie O'Mara (Nadia Sawalha, series 7), a con woman.

=== Introduced in series 8 ===
- Mr Wu (Paul Chan, series 8−10), owner of a local Chinese restaurant.
- Sammy Valentino (Shane Richie, series 8, 10), a local entertainer and washed-up television star.
- Crazy Daisy (Francis Barber, series 8), Troy's stalker.

=== Introduced in series 9 ===
- Motown John (Jonathan Hawkins, series 9)
- Malcolm Barrett (Mark Heap, series 9−10), Pauline's abusive boyfriend.
- Stanley Keen (Nigel Havers, series 9−10), Kenneth's enemy and dentist.
- Bean (David O'Reilly, series 9−10), a member of the circus.

=== Introduced in series 10 ===
- Vladimir (Antonio de la Cruz, series 10), Kenneth's temporary boyfriend.
- Nigel (Norman Pace, series 10), a cop investigating Lesley.
- Dennis (Gareth Hale, series 10), a cop investigating Lesley.
- Franco (Gary Oliver, series 10), Cyd's billionaire father.
