= Mick Garvey =

Television show character

- Benidorm character
- First appearance: "Episode 1"; 1 February 2007
- Last appearance: "Episode 44"; 9 January 2015
- Created by: Derren Litten
- Portrayed by: Steve Pemberton

In-universe information
- Occupation: Sunbed shop owner
- Spouse: Janice Garvey (m. 1997)
- Children: Chantelle Garvey (daughter); Michael Garvey (son)
- Relatives: Stan Garvey (father); Geraldine McAws (mother); Pete Garvey (brother); Coolio Garvey (grandson); Pythagoras Maltby (grandson)
- Origin: Manchester

Mick Garvey is a fictional character from the ITV comedy sitcom Benidorm, portrayed by Steve Pemberton. Mick first appeared in the pilot episode of the series, first broadcast on 1 February 2007. Mick is introduced as the patriarch of the Garvey family, consisting of his wife Janice Garvey (Siobhan Finneran), children Chantelle (Hannah Hobley) and Michael (Oliver Stokes), and mother-in-law Madge Harvey (Sheila Reid). His main storylines throughout his tenure include discovering his daughter Chantelle's teenage pregnancy, being convicted for false incapacity benefit claims, taking over a sunbed shop empire from Madge's husband Mel Harvey (Geoffrey Hutchings), supporting Madge both emotionally and financially after Mel's sudden death, losing his business after a series of fires, his feud with the Dyke family and dealing with his family's constant struggles with money and disfortune.

The Garvey family maintained a central part of the cast for the first six series. Ahead of the seventh series, it was announced that Pemberton and the remaining cast members of his on-screen family would be departing the programme. They made their final appearances in the second episode of the seventh series, in which they leave for a new life in Las Vegas to claim their million-dollar fortune.

== Creation and casting ==
Steve Pemberton was cast in the role of Mick Garvey, forming a central part of the original cast of Benidorm as a member of the Garvey family. Pemberton secured the role through a two-stage audition process, firstly solo and was then called back for a second audition with Siobhan Finneran, who played on-screen wife Janice Garvey, to test their chemistry. Tony Maudsley, who went on to play Kenneth Du Beke from the fourth series, also auditioned for the role.

In 2014, it was announced that Pemberton and the remaining members of the Garvey family would leave Benidorm during the seventh series. Both Pemberton and Finneran wanted to spend less time filming abroad, and neither wanted to leave on their own. Speaking on his departure, Pemberton said: "Benidorm has always been more than just a TV show for us. We're such good friends and part of one big happy family. Working on Benidorm has been the most fun I've ever had. I'd have kept going for the rest of my life, but there are other considerations. It was a very difficult decision, but the amount of time we were away from home was key. We all sat down and discussed it during series 6. It's great that we had the same instinct to go at the same time. No one wanted to go on their own. So all things considered, it was absolutely the right time to leave".

== Appearances ==
Mick comes to Benidorm after his mother in-law Madge Harvey (Sheila Reid) pays for a family holiday. He meets Susie (Jan Graveson) when shopping and flirts with her. When he sees her at Neptune's, his wife Janice (Siobhan Finneran) gets jealous. When his daughter Chantelle (Hannah Hobley) performs on karaoke, she collapses and is revealed to be heavily pregnant. Mick and Janice do their best to support her. The Garveys win a quiz, gaining a cash prize, and Mick reluctantly agrees to take his family on a day out to the beach. A woman takes photographs of Mick at the pool and later reveals herself to be from the Department of Social Services and informs Janice that she will use the photos as evidence to convict Mick for false incapacity benefit claims.

Madge's new boyfriend Mel Harvey (Geoffrey Hutchings) pays for the family to return to Benidorm, despite only knowing them for a matter of weeks. Mick forgets his and Janice's wedding anniversary so steals flowers from reception. Janice attempts to prevent Madge from going through with a wedding after Mel proposes to her and enlists Mick to try convince Mel to postpone their wedding plans. When Mel reveals that he is a multi-millionaire businessman, Mick is enthusiastic and informs Janice. The wedding ends in disaster after Geoff Maltby (Johnny Vegas) collides with Mel during a paragliding session. When Mel regains consciousness and appears to have lost his memory, Mick punches him after an idea is raised by Donald Stewart (Kenny Ireland), which results in him being arrested.

Having begun working for Mel, Mick returns to Benidorm with his family. Despite expecting a holiday, Mel asks Mick for support in launching a new mobility shop. He enlist Mick in charge of promotion, which involves riding a giant bike in an unflattering costume. When Mel's mobility shop burns down at its opening ceremony, Mick is no longer required to work. The family attend a day trip to the waterfalls of Algar, where Mick argues with the rest of his family. Mick leaves, worrying Janice as he fails to make contact. However, he organises for singer Shaun Foster-Conley to perform a song in tribute to Janice and they reconcile. Mel and Madge decide to relocate to Benidorm after buying the Benidorm Palace and Mel signs his sunbed shop empire in the UK over to Mick, much to his delight.

After Mel dies, Mick, Janice and their son Michael (Oliver Stokes) plan to surprise Madge by coming out to Spain on holiday. On their arrival to her villa, they are shocked to discover Cilla Black living there and it is revealed that Madge had sold the Benidorm Palace some months previously. It soon emerges that Madge is financially bankrupt after some poor business transactions were made by Mel prior to his death and they help Madge to eliminate her debts to local gangsters. Mick feuds with Pauline Maltby (Selina Griffiths) and they have several encounters that result in arguments. Madge, adamant to remain in Benidorm, becomes keen to take over the lease of a local bar. Although Janice is cautious, Mick agrees to enter a business partnership with her and they name the bar in honour of Mel.

The family run the bar over the summer though ultimately return to the UK. Mick initially stays home to deal with their sunbed business whilst Janice, Madge and Michael travel to Benidorm, before joining them. Mick is furious when his brother Pete and father Stan travel to Benidorm for Pete's stag do. Mick expresses his impatience with Pete and Stan reveals that he fabricated the story of Pete getting married so that Pete could take a break from nursing him through his ill health. The brothers reconcile and Mick agrees to support his immediate family. When Mohammed (Dhaffer L'Abidine) tells Madge that he is a former business associate of Mel, Mick is immediately suspicious of his intentions. Madge decides to marry Mohammed to avoid legal loopholes involved in Mohammed transferring money to her, which he claims belonged to Mel. When Mick and Michael watch football in a bar, they discover that Mohammed is an actor and conman and put a stop to the wedding. Mick reveals to family that all the sunbed shops were destroyed by fires and he had not paid the insurance premiums, leaving them with nothing.

When carrying Madge's bag through airport security, the family are stopped by a staff member, who proceeds to search their belongings. He finds tanning pills in the bag that Mick is carrying and he is held at the airport for suspected drug smuggling. When fellow holidaymaker Clive Dyke (Perry Benson) gives Janice a lift to the airport, Mick is jealous and punches Clive after he is released when the pills are found to be purely herbal. Mick is furious when he discovers that Michael has gotten a tattoo and tries to stop Michael from socialising with Clive's son Tiger (Danny Walters), who had been present when Michael got his tattoo. Various circumstances enhance the feud between the Garvey and Dyke families though they make amends.

Madge becomes worried she is being stalked when she repeatedly receives unknown contact attempts. They meet an American financier named Buck A. Roo (Leslie Jordan), who reveals that Madge is set to inherit millions from the Collins family, ancestors of Mel. They suspect his claims to be fraudulent so they decline his offer of representation. Les Conroy (Tim Healy) conducts some research on Buck and confirms he was telling the truth. The Garveys hurry to the airport where they catch him just in time, where they all board a flight to Las Vegas for a fresh start.

== Development ==
Mick would do anything for a quiet life. Sadly it's not what he gets when he comes to Benidorm with his Lancashire family on their holidays abroad. Mick likes to save money whenever he can. At the end of the first series he was prosecuted for benefit fraud! He's been in trouble a few times, he found himself in jail for punching his new father-in-law and had to spend time in customs whilst they decided whether Madge's tanning pills were illegal drugs. He still doesn't like Madge much.

— British Comedy Guide on Mick

Discussing the appeal of the programme an its setting of a holiday in Spain, Pemberton said: "I think everyone can relate to it. Everyone's been on holiday, everyone knows what it's like - and the time of year it goes out definitely helps. I was talking to my mum about it and she said 'I'm really ready for another series because it's so miserable and grey at the moment'. It'll be nice to have a bit of blue sea and skies and it's good fun. It's not like 'Wish You Were Here' where you feel, I love watching these holidays but I can't afford to go on them'. It's Benidorm! You can afford it."

During the sixth series, the Garvey family were at the centre of a storyline where they feuded with the new Dyke family. Considering the contrasts between the two families, Pemberton analysed: "The Garveys love coming to Benidorm and we come every year whereas their family has just arrived and they’re kind of, 'Urgh, where are we?' Especially the wife who is like, 'Why are we in this horrendous place?' You need that in this show. We've always had characters who don’t really like being here".

== In other media ==
In 2012, Pemberton appeared in his role of Mick for Sport Relief 2012, in a sketch with fellow Benidorm co-stars Tony Maudsley, Jake Canuso, Oliver Stokes and Adam Gillen. It situated their characters in a fictional audition for ITV talent competition Britain's Got Talent, performing "Let's Get Ready to Rhumble".

== Reception ==
David Butcher from Radio Times praised the performance of Pemberton, stating: "It was a vision of holiday hell, but performances from the likes of Steve Pemberton gave it comic bite. It was never quite going to be Royston-Vasey-by-the-sea, but there was a hint of that".

Reviewing the series, David Stubbs from The Guardian considered the vitality of key cast members with its success: "Derren Litten's comedy showcases a certain kind of lobster-coloured all-Englishness that can only be found abroad nowadays. It's broad rather than acute, and occasionally hidebound, but a familiar cast, including Steve Pemberton, help make for viewing as comfy as a carton of chips".

The Garvey family emerged as popular and a key asset to Benidorm. During the broadcasting of the sixth series, Patrick Mulkern of Radio Times criticised the evolution of the series though maintained a positive stance on the Garvey family: "Apart from the odd racy line, Benidorm is creaking like an old banger in need of lubrication. The Garveys deserve better material".

== See also ==
- List of Benidorm characters
