= Tiger Dyke =

Television show character

- Benidorm character
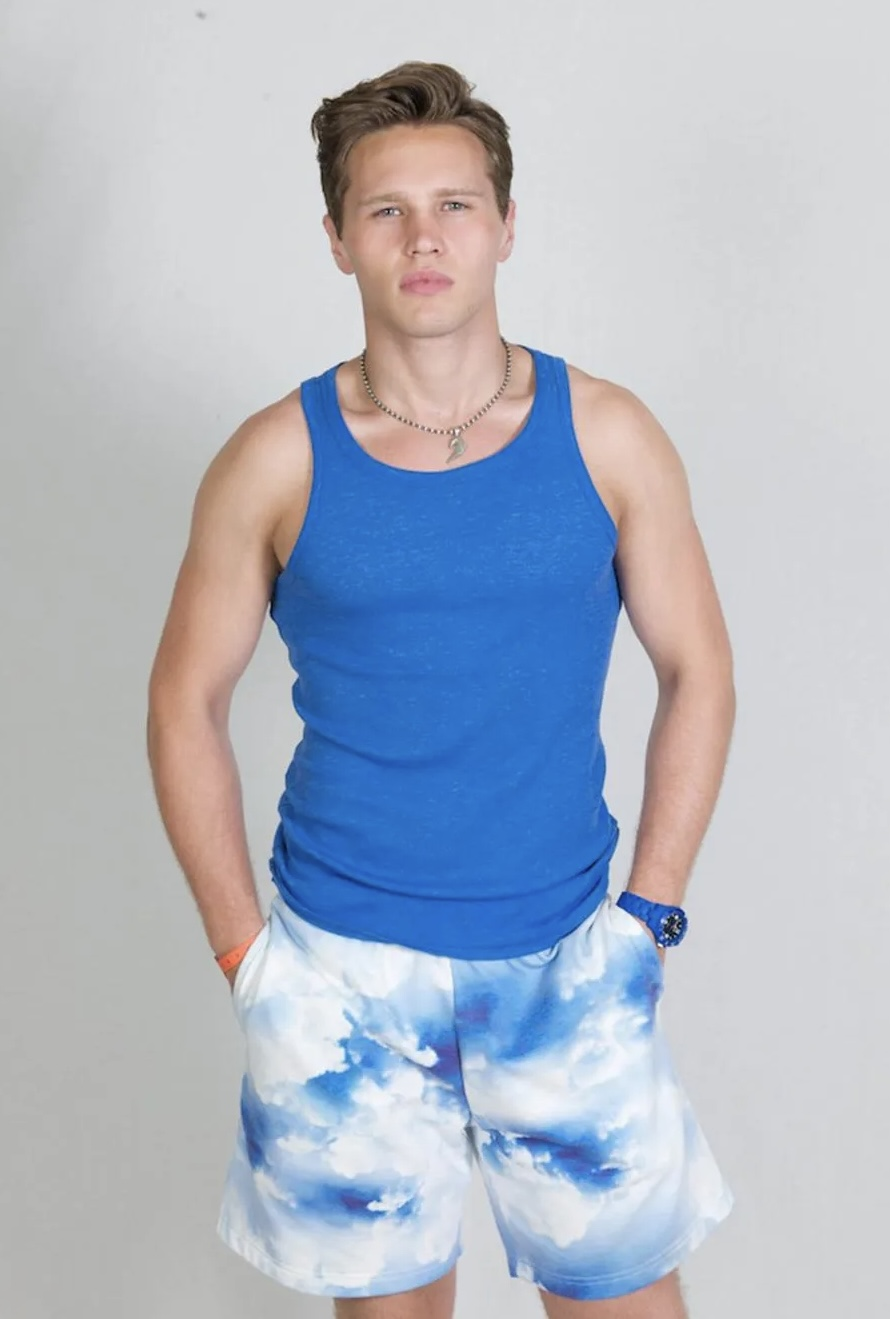
- First appearance: "Episode 36"; 2 January 2014
- Last appearance: "Episode 65"; 3 May 2017
- Created by: Derren Litten
- Portrayed by: Danny Walters

In-universe information
- Occupation: Labourer
- Significant others: Annie Redmond
- Relatives: Clive Dyke (father); Tonya Dyke (mother); Bianca Dyke (sister); Terri Dawson (aunt)
- Origin: Watford

Tiger Dyke is a fictional character from the ITV comedy sitcom Benidorm, portrayed by Danny Walters. Tiger first appeared in the first episode of the sixth series, first broadcast on 2 January 2014. Tiger is introduced as a member of the Dyke family, the only son and youngest child of Clive Dyke (Perry Benson) and Tonya Dyke (Hannah Waddingham).

His main storylines throughout his tenure include his friendship with Michael Garvey (Oliver Stokes), his mischievous behaviour and money-making schemes at the Solana, a fling with Annie Redmond (Alice Barlow), his chaotic friendship with Joey Ellis (Nathan Bryon) and a drunken encounter with pensioner Loretta Chase (Kate Fitzgerald).

== Creation and casting ==
The character of Tiger was created as a member of the Dyke family, a new family introduced for the sixth series to rival the long-serving Garvey family. Danny Walters was cast in the role, shortly after graduating from the London School of Musical Theatre. Discussing the character, Walters said: "At that age you don't wanna go on holiday with your parents. He hates it. He's the type of kid I wouldn't want to mess with. Not nasty but he likes to get into trouble. He doesn't care what happens. He's always nicking something but he never gets caught. He's sly". Despite being 20 when he gained the role, the character was initially portrayed as 16.

In March 2017, it was announced that Walters would not reprise his role during the tenth series, being one of three series regulars to leave the show. Walters was unable to commit to filming due to scheduling conflicts with his role in BBC soap opera EastEnders. Speaking about his departure, Walters said: "No, season 10 I wasn't a part of. I have so much confidence that they will do very well. It's their tenth series and for a comedy sitcom to be going for 10 years is a fantastic achievement. I think they deserve to win awards just for the fact of going for 10 years. Benidorm has a massive place in my heart!"

== Appearances ==
The Dyke family arrives at the Solana resort and are instantly dissatisfied with the realities they uncover at the "four-star" hotel they believed to have booked. Tiger befriends fellow teenager Michael Garvey (Oliver Stokes) and the duo head out into Benidorm together. They get drunk and Michael gets a tattoo, causing a rift between their families. Tiger steals Michael's grandmother Madge Harvey (Sheila Reid)'s tanning pills and sells them to a stag group, who believe them to be narcotics. When they go to the beach, Tiger unsuccessfully flirts with local girl Elena (Holly Earl), who takes an interest in Michael instead. Tiger then organises for Michael to meet her at the beach as their families reconcile and get past their differences.

Tiger returns to Benidorm with his friend Zach, who steals his money and flees. His father Clive Dyke (Perry Benson) flies to meet him and give him money. Upon his arrival, Clive reveals that he has separated from Tiger's mother Tonya Dyke (Hannah Waddingham), much to his disappointment. Tiger becomes frustrated as Clive attempts to flirt with other holidaymakers and the pair end up arguing with two women who Clive attempts to talk to. They are subsequently joined on holiday by Clive's sister Terri Dawson (Charlotte Eaton). Tiger takes an interest in singer Annie Redmond (Alice Barlow) and makes several attempts to attract her. Eventually, they sing together on karaoke and share a kiss.

Tiger brings his friend Joey Ellis (Nathan Bryon) to Benidorm for his first holiday abroad. Tiger is forced into the more sensible role out of the pair as Joey demonstrates his unintelligent and chaotic behaviour. Tiger tricks Joey into performing a strip dance on stage in Neptune's as Joey believes that doing so will attract barmaid Amber Platt (Jessica Ellerby). They later explore the local scenery, climbing a mountain where they save a hiker (Angus Deayton) who has injured himself. As a result, they are nominated for the Hero award at the Pride of Benidorm Awards, which they go on to win. After discovering that Joey is unemployed, Tiger arranges for him to work at his father's construction site.

On the first night of their subsequent holiday, Tiger and Joey organise a night out with fellow holidaymaker Rob Dawson (Josh Bolt), who they befriend the previous year. As Rob arrives, a drunken Tiger is seen dancing with Rob's grandmother Loretta Chase (Kate Fitzgerald), with Joey and Rob stepping in as they prepare to kiss. Tiger struggles to remember the events of that night the following day before remembering that Loretta comforted him in his room before he fell asleep. Tiger discovers that Joey is talented at solving complex mathematical equations and suggests they use this skill at the casino. However, Joey's stupidity results in losing all of Rob's money, frustrating Tiger and Rob.

Tiger was set to return to Benidorm with Joey though was unable to attend. He offers his place to Callum Byrne (Julian Moore-Cook) and Callum reveals to Joey that he was unable to afford to pay Tiger for the costs of the holiday.

== Development ==
Tiger is a bit of a trouble maker and causes conflict between the Dyke and Garvey families because he keeps leading young Michael astray. In just the first few days of the holiday, Tiger manages to get Michael drunk, help him get a tattoo and involves him in a plan to steal the Solana's all inclusive wristbands and sell them in town. In Series 8, Tiger is on holiday without his family but has friend Joey in tow.

— British Comedy Guide on Tiger

Ahead of the seventh series, Walters suggested that Tiger would heavily mature as his characterisation was developed further: "He's basically grown up a lot this year. Although he's still a bit of a cheeky boy and very mouthy, he's also grown up and matured. Tiger's taken a journey with this audience. It's like a coming of age. He goes through things others my age will go through. With Tiger, unfortunately there's no thought process before he speaks. If he doesn't like something he'll say it. He's still like that, but he's much more aware of things! But he does get into a lot of mischief this year but not so much with Michael Garvey". Discussing the introduction of the character's aunt Terri Dawson (Charlotte Eaton), Walters analysed the close relationship between them: "They're like best friends. Tiger's mum Tonya was more like a vulture type of character where as Terri and Tiger basically get on. It's a lovely relationship. There are times when Tiger opens up and tells her how he feels and Tiger doesn't really open up a lot, he never lets his emotions out. He usually keeps it all in but he can tell Terri things because he's close to her".

Nathan Bryon joined the cast for the eighth series, portraying Joey Ellis, a new holiday companion of Tiger. Addressing their friendship, Walters said: "The two are just a typical mates. There's so much banter between them. They're just lads on holiday, fooling around and having a great laugh". Bryon considered the characters to be "mates finding a lot out about each other as they go along". Discussing the romantic intentions of the individual characters, Bryon stated: "We try hard and we go to ultimate lengths, but there's definitely a bit of bromance going on between them".

== Reception ==
Srishti Nirula was critical of the writing behind Benidorm and suggested that certain characters were "poorly drawn", adding: "When it comes down to it, the show suffered from really bad writing, whether it was clunky dialogue or poorly drawn characters. When Tiger Dyke (the only description I can come up with is 'an idiot guest') wakes up after a night out, he says: 'I’m never drinking again.' How original."

During a negative review of the eighth series of Benidorm, a comedic storyline involving Tiger and Joey Ellis (Nathan Bryon) at a bar was panned by Sam Wollaston of The Guardian, referring to their "predictably disastrous consequences: misunderstandings – linguistic and cultural – a run-in with a local biker gang, and a lot of enforced drinking, followed by a lot of farting. Yes farting, F-bombs, big atomic ones. At least the bikers provide a nice excuse to play Ace of Spades by Motorhead".

== See also ==
- List of Benidorm characters
