= Benidorm series 6 =

Sixth season of television series

Benidorm
- Series 6
- Starring: Steve Pemberton; Siobhan Finneran; Sheila Reid; Oliver Stokes; Kenny Ireland; Janine Duvitski; Jake Canuso; Tim Healy; Adam Gillen; Tony Maudsley; Sherrie Hewson; Perry Benson; Hannah Waddingham; Danny Walters; Bel Powley
- No. of episodes: 7

Release
- Original network: ITV
- Original release: 2 January – 13 February 2014

Series chronology
- ← Previous; Series 5 Next → Series 7

The sixth series of the ITV television series Benidorm, which is a sitcom set in an all-inclusive holiday resort (The Solana) in Benidorm, Spain, began broadcasting on 2 January 2014, consisting of seven episodes. The entire series was written by Derren Litten whereas both Sandy Johnson and David Sant were credited as individual directors throughout the series. Returning from the fifth series were the Garvey family, consisting of Mick (Steve Pemberton), Janice (Siobhan Finneran), Michael Garvey (Oliver Stokes) and Janice's mother Madge Barron (Sheila Reid); swingers Donald (Kenny Ireland) and Jacqueline Stewart (Janine Duvitski); hairdressers Liam Conroy (Adam Gillen) and Kenneth Du Beke (Tony Maudsley); and Solana staff, consisting of barmen Mateo Castellanos (Jake Canuso) and Les/Lesley Conroy (Tim Healy), and manageress Joyce Temple-Savage (Sherrie Hewson). A new family was introduced – the Dykes from Watford, consisting of married couple Clive (Perry Benson) and Tonya (Hannah Waddingham) and their children Tiger (Danny Walters) and Bianca (Bel Powley).

Overall, the series received an average viewership of 6.76 million, with the opening episode receiving 7.95 million viewers. The series concluded on 13 February 2014, with the series finale attracting 7.01 million. The series was successful enough for the programme to be recommissioned for a seventh series, which broadcast in early 2015.

== Cast ==
=== Main ===
- Steve Pemberton as Mick Garvey
- Siobhan Finneran as Janice Garvey
- Sheila Reid as Madge Harvey
- Oliver Stokes as Michael Garvey
- Kenny Ireland as Donald Stewart
- Janine Duvitski as Jacqueline Stewart
- Jake Canuso as Mateo Castellanos
- Tim Healy as Les/Lesley Conroy
- Adam Gillen as Liam Conroy
- Tony Maudsley as Kenneth Du Beke
- Sherrie Hewson as Joyce Temple-Savage
- Perry Benson as Clive Dyke
- Hannah Waddingham as Tonya Dyke
- Danny Walters as Tiger Dyke
- Bel Powley as Bianca Dyke (episodes 2–7)

=== Recurring ===
- Louis Emerick as Norman the Doorman
- Asa Elliott as himself
- Nicholas Burns as Martin Weedon
- Matthew Kelly as Cyril Babcock
- Holly Earl as Elena

=== Guest ===
- Philip Olivier as Jason Gallagher
- Joan Collins as Crystal Hennessy-Vass

== Episodes ==
No. overall	Episode	Directed by	Written by	Original release date	UK viewers (millions)
36	"Episode 1"	David Sant	Derren Litten	2 January 2014	7.95 (Note: 6.36 million on ITV, 815,000 on ITV HD, 767,000 on ITV +1)
The Garveys' holiday starts to go wrong at Alicante Airport when a supposed bag of Madge's tanning pills gets mistaken for drugs – and Mick gets the blame. Meanwhile, the Dyke family arrive at the Solana to start their holiday but are shocked to find out the 4-star hotel isn't what they expected. Swingers Donald and Jacqueline stage an unusual protest, after Joyce refuses to give them a room.
37	"Episode 2"	David Sant	Derren Litten	9 January 2014	6.92 (Note: 5.48 million on ITV, 799,000 on ITV HD, 644,000 on ITV +1)
Cocktail waiter Jason Gallagher (Philip Olivier) looking for work threatens to jeopardise Mateo's reputation. Michael Garvey is led astray by Tiger Dyke, and sells the Solana's all-inclusive wristbands – leading to Neptunes being completely full. Clive Dyke finds his daughter Bianca wandering through Alicante Airport in tears, whilst Mick has been released from the cells – finding out that the "drugs" were only herbal tanning pills.
38	"Episode 3"	David Sant	Derren Litten	16 January 2014	6.42 (Note: 4.99 million on ITV, 710,000 on ITV HD, 715,000 on ITV +1)
It's the grand reopening of Blow 'n' Go. Liam falls in love with Bianca, and Donald & Jacqueline receive sad news about their friend Big Donna. Martin Weedon arrives at the resort for what proves to be a rowdy stag do, and Madge is determined to stir things up with the Dyke family – so Janice, Mick, Tonya, Bianca and Clive all do their best to ignore her.
39	"Episode 4"	David Sant	Derren Litten	23 January 2014	6.44 (Note: 4.97 million on ITV, 827,000 on ITV HD, 638,000 on ITV +1.)
Following the stag weekend, best man Martin wakes up in bed next to Bianca, but there's a shock in store when she reveals her true age and he steels himself to face the music with Clive and Tonya. Meanwhile, Kenneth has a crisis at the salon, and when Joyce sets up a volleyball court by the pool, umpire Mateo bends the rules of the game so he can win a bet against Tiger and Michael.
40	"Episode 5"	Sandy Johnson	Derren Litten	30 January 2014	6.15 (Note: 4.87 million on ITV, 795,000 on ITV HD, 484,000 on ITV +1.)
Donald and Jacqueline's friend Big Donna has died. Before scattering her ashes, Donald & Jacqueline are determined to give her a big send off. But with Joyce Temple-Savage on a mystery date, and Lesley in charge of the Solana, nothing goes according to plan.
41	"Episode 6"	Sandy Johnson	Derren Litten	6 February 2014	6.46 (Note: 5.21 million on ITV, 787,000 on ITV HD, 465,000 on ITV +1.)
Madge is absorbing some dreadful news she's received from Dr Kundu, while Kenneth decides he's going on a massive health kick. The Solana guests go head to head in a Man v. Food competition, organised by Cyril Babcock, who Joyce has now appointed as Assistant Manager.
42	"Episode 7"	Sandy Johnson	Derren Litten	13 February 2014	7.01
Joyce's boss, Crystal Hennessy-Vass, arrives to inspect the 4-Star Solana. Donald and Jacqueline have a surprise guest of their own, while Mateo and Lesley are left in charge of a group of VIPs. Tiger and Michael come to blows over a woman, and their parents come to blows with each other.

== Production ==
In April 2013, it was confirmed that Benidorm had been renewed for a further sixth and seventh series, with news that the sixth series had begun filming.

Upon the announcement of the sixth series, it was confirmed that a new "loudmouth" family from Watford would be introduced: the Dyke family, consisting of patriarch Clive (Perry Benson), his "trophy-wife" Tonya (Hannah Waddingham), their "troublemaker" teenage son Tiger (Danny Walters) and daughter Bianca (Bel Powley). Benson stated that the Dykes would feud with the Garvey family, adding: "They're at war at different points and Madge pours the petrol on the fire." Original cast member Nicholas Burns reprised his role as Martin Weedon for a short stint after a five-year absence, in a storyline depicting him visiting Benidorm with his friends on a stag do.

Matthew Kelly also reprised his supporting role of Cyril Babcock from the fifth series. In May 2013, it was announced that Joan Collins would join the cast as Crystal Hennessy-Vass, the CEO of the Solana Hotel Group. Multiple guest appearances occurred throughout the series, including Rustie Lee as Queenie, a friend of Donald Jacqueline, whereas comedy duo The Krankies and television presenter Janet Street-Porter made cameo appearances.

== Home media ==
The sixth series was released on a two-disc DVD set in the United Kingdom on 17 February 2014, which included a series of outtakes.

The sixth series first became available for streaming through Netflix in the United Kingdom on 1 October 2015.
