= Bobby Knutt =

English actor and comedian (1945–2017)

- Knutt in character as Eddie Dawson from the comedy TV series Benidorm
- Born: Robert Andrew Wass; 25 November 1945; Sheffield, England
- Died: 25 September 2017 (aged 71); Southern France
- Occupations: Actor, comedian
- Years active: 1961–2017
- Television: Coronation Street (1980–1983); Emmerdale (1995–1997, 2004); Benidorm (2016–2018)
- Spouse: Donna Hartley (m. 1986; died 2013)
- Children: 3

Robert Andrew Wass (25 November 1945 – 25 September 2017), known professionally as Bobby Knutt, was an English actor and comedian. He was known throughout his acting career for appearing as Albert Dingle in the ITV soap opera Emmerdale and in Coast to Coast, a film with Lenny Henry, and in his final years for the role of Eddie Dawson in the ITV sitcom Benidorm. Before making his name in British television, he had appeared in another ITV soap opera, Coronation Street, from 1980 to 1983 portraying Ron Sykes.

He was married to athlete Donna Hartley from 1986 until her death in 2013. He died on 25 September 2017 while holidaying in Southern France. His last appearance was in the tenth series of Benidorm; this was the last series of that programme.

== Early life ==
Knutt was born in Sheffield. After passing the eleven-plus in 1957, he attended Abbeydale Grammar School in Sheffield. Still at school, he began to perform as a singer in a group called Bob Andrews and the Questors in 1961, switching to another group, the Whirlwinds, in 1963, and in 1964 formed a comedy double act called Pee and Knutt.

== Career ==
In 1965 under the stage name of Bobby Knutt he went solo, performing as one of the youngest pro comedians in the country.

He was first known nationally for his performances on the Granada Television show The Comedians and The Wheeltappers and Shunters Social Club. He was cast in the lead role in the BBC's The Price of Coal (1977) directed by Ken Loach, allowing him to move beyond stand-up comedy. He acted in many British television comedies and dramas including Last of the Summer Wine, Hetty Wainthropp Investigates, All Creatures Great & Small, Our Friends in the North.

Knutt made two appearances in the Yorkshire Television period drama Heartbeat. His first appearance was as Lord Ashfordley's Game Keeper Harry Price, in the episode Arms and the Man; following which he played wrestling promoter Pat Starr in the episode Thanks to Alfred.

Notably, he starred in soap operas: Emmerdale as Albert Dingle, Coronation Street as garage-owner Ron Sykes, and his last acting role as Eddie Dawson in the sitcom Benidorm.

He had regular roles in fourteen pantomimes at Sheffield's Crucible and Lyceum theatres. In 2008, he published his autobiography Eyup Knutty followed by the sequel Eyup Again in 2010. He worked as a comedian on cruise ships and provided the voice of "Gaffer" on the Tetley Tea Folk TV ads. In 2012, a shoulder operation went wrong, disabling his right arm thus depriving him of his ability to play guitar which was a regular finale to his cabaret act on the cruise ships. Due to this he reluctantly retired from live entertainment but continued in acting.

== Personal life ==
Knutt was married three times, and had two sons and two daughters by his first two wives. On 20 January 1986 he married his third wife, athlete Donna Hartley-Wass, a bronze medallist track-runner in the 1980 Olympic Games (4 × 400 m relay), and remained married until her death in 2013. On his 25th wedding anniversary he was quoted as saying: "I wish I'd married my third wife first".

== Death ==
On 25 September 2017, while still on holiday in the south of France, Knutt suffered a heart attack and was rushed to hospital, where he died aged 71.
