= Benidorm series 9 =

Benidorm
- Series 9
- Starring: Jake Canuso; Tim Healy; Tony Maudsley; Adam Gillen; Shelley Longworth; Sherrie Hewson; Danny Walters; Bobby Knutt; Steve Edge; Julie Graham; Josh Bolt; Honor Kneafsey; Nathan Bryon; Kate Fitzgerald; Janine Duvitski; Paul Bazely; Elsie Kelly; Johnny Vegas; Selina Griffiths; Simon Greenall
- No. of episodes: 9

Release
- Original network: ITV
- Original release: 1 March – 3 May 2017

Series chronology
- ← Previous; Series 8 Next → Series 10

The ninth series of the ITV television series Benidorm, which is a sitcom set in an all-inclusive holiday resort (The Solana) in Benidorm, Spain, began broadcasting on 1 March 2017, consisting of nine episodes. The series was written by Derren Litten, Gaby Hull, Mark Brotherhood and Damon Rochefort. It was directed by both Robin Shepperd and David Sant. Returning from the eighth series included Solana staff Mateo Castellanos (Jake Canuso), Les/Lesley Conroy (Tim Healy) and Joyce Temple-Savage (Sherrie Hewson) and hairdressers Kenneth Du Beke (Tony Maudsley) and Troy Ganatra (Paul Bazely). Holidaymakers included the Dawson family, consisting of parents Billy (Steve Edge) and Sheron (Julie Graham), their children Rob (Josh Bolt) and Jodie (Honor Kneafsey) and Billy's father Eddie (Bobby Knutt), Tiger Dyke (Danny Walters), Joey Ellis (Nathan Bryon), Jacqueline Stewart (Janine Duvitski) and the Maltby family, consisting of Geoff (Johnny Vegas), Noreen (Elsie Kelly) and Pauline (Selina Griffiths). Adam Gillen reprised his role as hairdresser Liam Conroy, having last appeared in the seventh series as a regular before making a guest appearance in the previous series, whereas Shelley Longworth reprised her role as Sam Wood, a former holidaymaker who is now a holiday rep, for the first time since the fifth series. New additions to the cast included Kate Fitzgerald as Sheron's mother Loretta Chase and Simon Greenall as barman Neville.

== Cast ==
=== Main ===
- Jake Canuso as Mateo Castellanos
- Tim Healy as Les/Lesley Conroy
- Tony Maudsley as Kenneth Du Beke
- Adam Gillen as Liam Conroy
- Shelley Longworth as Sam Wood
- Sherrie Hewson as Joyce Temple-Savage
- Danny Walters as Tiger Dyke
- Bobby Knutt as Eddie Dawson
- Steve Edge as Billy Dawson
- Julie Graham as Sheron Dawson
- Josh Bolt as Rob Dawson
- Honor Kneafsey as Jodie Dawson
- Nathan Bryon as Joey Ellis
- Kate Fitzgerald as Loretta Chase
- Janine Duvitski as Jacqueline Stewart
- Paul Bazely as Troy Ganatra
- Elsie Kelly as Noreen Maltby
- Johnny Vegas as Geoff Maltby
- Selina Griffiths as Pauline Maltby
- Simon Greenall as Neville

=== Recurring ===
- Jonathan Hawkins as Motown Jonathan
- Paul Chan as Mr Wu
- John Challis as Monty Staines
- Michael Fenton Stevens as Sir Henry
- Mark Heap as Malcolm Barrett

=== Guest ===
- Nigel Havers as Stanley Keen
- Amanda Barrie as Psychic Sue
- Joan Collins as Crystal Hennessy-Vass
- David O'Reilly as Bean

== Episodes ==
No. overall	Episode	Directed by	Written by	Original release date	UK viewers (millions)
57	"Episode 1"	Robin Shepperd	Derren Litten	1 March 2017	5.79
The Dawsons' holiday starts with a bang when Eddie has an accident and Sheron's fashion taste is put into question. An old inheritance puts a smile Kenneth's face. Meanwhile, Tiger and Joey are in a party mood as Sam, the new holiday rep and former guest at the Solana, takes them under her wing.
58	"Episode 2"	Robin Shepperd	Derren Litten	8 March 2017	4.95
Kenneth inadvertently starts up a mini-cab business whilst Joyce is asked to go to a conference in the city of Barcelona, but panics when she finds out she has to deliver a speech in Spanish. Elsewhere, Sheron's mother Loretta arrives at the Solana to join the family on holiday, and it turns out she had already made quite an impression in Benidorm the night before. Joey thinks he has managed to sign Tiger and himself up for a free trip to Ibiza, but things do not go according to plan.
59	"Episode 3"	Robin Shepperd	Derren Litten & Gaby Hull	15 March 2017	4.84
Joyce turns to Lesley for help when the Solana's meat supplier lets her down, while Sam offers Joey and Tiger some part-time work trying to attract custom for one of the local bars. Jodie is asked to audition for an advert back in the UK, which soon becomes a family affair for the Dawsons as they try to get it just right. Troy seems to be keeping very close tabs on Kenneth and Liam in the salon, which may have something to do with Jacqueline's arrival.
60	"Episode 4"	Robin Shepperd	Derren Litten & Gaby Hull	29 March 2017	4.59
Loretta takes Jodie back to the UK for her advertisement shoot, but offers Rob her swanky Hotel Beltoro room in case he gets lucky. Billy and Sheron think some roleplay will spice things up in the romance department, but Eddie has his eye on the room too as he hopes to entice Jacqueline. Rob ends up a little worse for wear, but a chance meeting with a university mate ensures he does not go astray. Elsewhere, Kenneth and Liam have a falling out whilst Lesley and Mateo are intent on finding out what scam Sam is up to now.
61	"Episode 5"	David Sant	Derren Litten	5 April 2017	4.46
Joyce asks Sir Henry to step in while she is at the conference in Barcelona, and Les has asked Neville – an old mate from the Geordie Bar – to cover for him while he is back in the UK. Can Sir Henry run a steady ship, or is it a chance for a few pranks? Sam has some free tickets for the dinosaur park and Liam has a day off, so it is the perfect opportunity for him to address his childhood fear of dinosaurs. Tiger and Joey are up for a free trip too, but end up getting roped in as the entertainment. The Maltbys are back at the Solana but there is something not quite right about Pauline – who has developed some strange eating habits. Noreen and the Oracle are determined to get to the bottom of it.
62	"Episode 6"	David Sant	Mark Brotherhood	12 April 2017	4.72
Noreen and Geoff try to figure out the father of Pauline's unborn child – cue the Oracle's golden opportunity to hone his sleuthing skills. Billy gets some life changing advice and the staff feel the heat at the Solana Psychic convention. Joey, Rob and Tiger bank on a profitable trip to the casino.
63	"Episode 7"	David Sant	Damon Rochefort & Mark Brotherhood	19 April 2017	4.62
A ban is placed on alcohol in Benidorm due to a religious festival, but the guests are determined to ignore it, despite the staff trying their best to enforce the new rules. Meanwhile, while Joyce is away Sam sees another opportunity to make a few extra euros. Pauline's mysterious Malcolm arrives and she seems to be under his spell yet again.
64	"Episode 8"	David Sant	Derren Litten	26 April 2017	4.69
Concerns for Liam's well-being leads to confusion when it is feared he has joined a self-help group as terrible exam results leave Rob questioning his future. Suspicion surrounds Malcolm's identity and Kenneth is intent on an exposé. Eddie receives the news that his best friend back home has passed away, but nobody seems to be interested.
65	"Episode 9"	David Sant	Derren Litten	3 May 2017	4.46
A disaster occurs at the Solana and when Crystal gets wind of the situation, Joyce's job is at stake. Things start to look up when Joyce secures a free trip to the Benidorm Circus, but will everything go as planned? Meanwhile, Liam has a difficult decision to make and a surprise group of guests rock up at Neptune's which may have something to do with Jacqueline.

== Home media ==
The ninth series was released on DVD in the United Kingdom on 8 May 2017. Distributed by 2 Entertain, it was released as a three-disc set.

The ninth series first became available for streaming through Netflix in the United Kingdom on 6 December 2017.
