= Jan Graveson =

English actress and singer

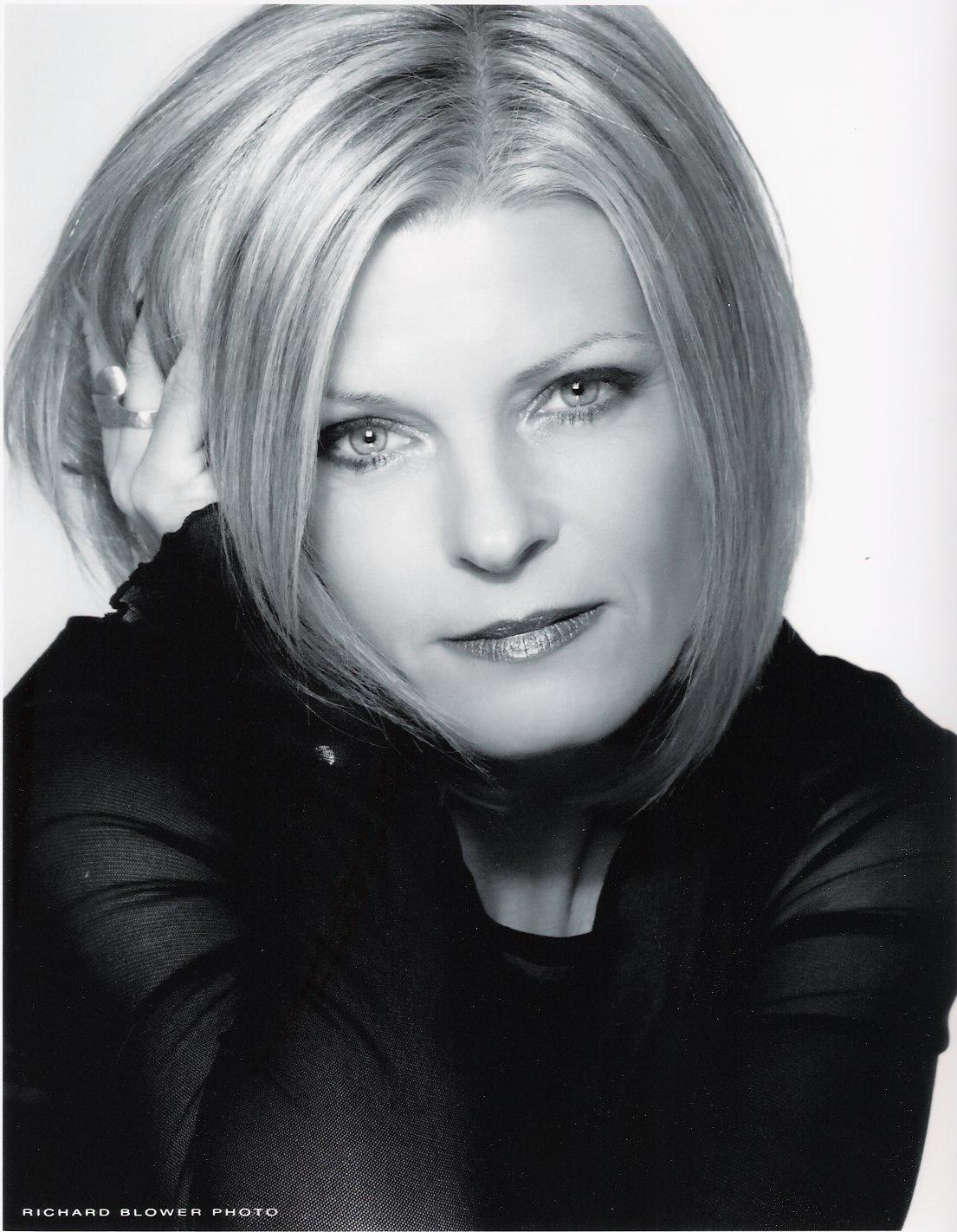
- Born: Janice Margaret Graveson; 1965 (age 60–61); Easington, County Durham, England
- Occupations: Actress, singer
- Years active: 1972–present

Janice Margaret "Jan" Graveson (born 1965) is an English actress and singer. She is best known for her roles in EastEnders as Disa O'Brien and Benidorm as Susie.

== Career ==
Graveson did not attend any acting schools, as her parents could not afford to send her there. From the age of 7, she attended dance class. By the age of 12, she had won the British Tap Dancing Championships and English Tap Dancing Championships, as well as becoming the North East Tap and Song and Dance winner. Graveson took her dance teachers tickets at age 18. She furthered her opportunities by moving to London to venture into TV and West End musicals and London theatre productions.

=== Television ===
Graveson began performing on the club circuit at the age of six, but made her television debut in White Peak Farm in 1988. 1986 Auf wiedersehen pet season 2, girl in Canibals disco. She went on to play the pregnant runaway Disa O'Brien in the BBC soap opera EastEnders from 1990 to 1991. She has also appeared in episodes of Spender (1991), Heartbeat (2001; 2007), Casualty (1989;1992;2012), The Glass Virgin (1995), Wycliffe (1998) and A Touch of Frost (1996).

Graveson appeared in the BBC children's television show Byker Grove from 2004 to 2006 as Heather, the mother of Hayley Robinson (Heather Garrett). Graveson was seen in an episode of the BBC hospital drama Holby City in 2006, and in 2007 she appeared in the ITV sitcom Benidorm. She guest starred in the ITV police drama, The Bill, in 2008, and Doctors.

=== Film ===
In 2005, Graveson starred alongside Ray Winstone in Richard Hawkins' BAFTA-nominated psychological thriller, Everything. Graveson played Naomi, a Soho prostitute, who was hired by Winstone's character, Richard. Instead of having sex with Naomi, Richard pays her just to talk. The film is largely a succession of dialogues between the two, intermittently broken up by events such as Richard hiding in the wardrobe to watch Naomi at work, or a backstory involving his wife and daughter, which gradually becomes more and more important. The film had a budget of just £47,500 and was filmed consecutively in Soho, London in only nine days. Graveson received much high acclaim for her performance in the film. Graveston received Winner: Best Newcomer to Screen at the Sydney Film Festival 2006 (Everything) and received outstanding reviews for her portrayal of Naomi. In 2011, she appeared in the feature film Bash Street, which was written and directed by Everything co-star Ed Deedigan and produced by Kandu Arts.

Her Indian work includes Khufiya, Gully Boy, Made In Heaven, Dr. Max (Netflix) and Shoojit Sircar (a PayPal commercial). Graveson starred in the film Elysium Hernalsiense, which was shot in Vienna in 2017. This film won Best Feature Film at the Arthouse film Festival in Chicago in November 2018.

=== Theatre ===
Graveson's first major role was in Blood Brothers, playing the role of Linda in London's West End (Albery and Phoenix theatres), Toronto and Broadway. On stage, she has played Catherine Cookson in Tom and Catherine at the Customs House theatre in South Shields. She has also appeared in Hard Times at the Piccadilly Theatre in London's West End, and in Raving Beauties with John McArdle at the Liverpool Playhouse (1991–1992). She played Stella in Stairway to Heaven No.1 National Tour, and Helen in And a Nightingale Sang at the Octagon Theatre.

Graveson sang in bands as a teenager and later had a brief spell as a pop singer in the early 1990s. In 1991, she released a cover version of the 1964 Cilla Black hit "Anyone Who Had a Heart".

In 1993–94, Graveson earned a Tony Award nomination in the "Best Performance by a Featured Actress in a Musical" category, for her role as Linda in Blood Brothers N.Y.C. Graveson has continued to perform musically. She played at the British Acoustic Festival with her band Disco Indians in July 2007. Graveson also composes her own songs and often performs live at venues. She has attained all grades up to 8 with the Royal Schools of Music on pianoforte.

Graveson started her professional stage career at the Live Theatre, Newcastle in 1983 alongside Robson Green. She also runs her own school for acting, singing and dance for adults (WOW Performing Arts) and has written thesis on for practical studies in musical theatre / theatre skills for actors wishing to sing and those wanting to pursue a life treading the boards in theatre.

== Personal life ==
Graveson currently resides in Mumbai, London and Chicago.
