= Sticky Vicky =

Spanish magician (1943–2023)

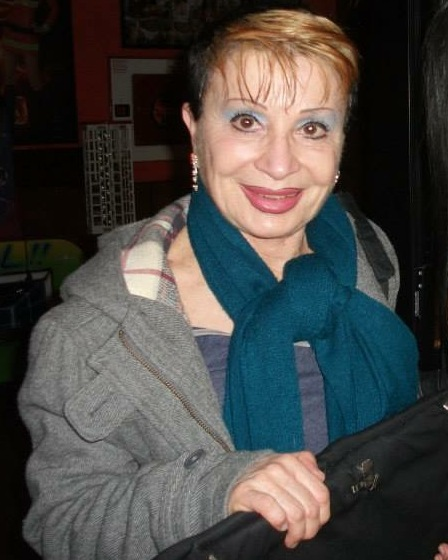
- Leyton in 2016
- Born: Victoria María Aragüés Gadea; 15 April 1943; Santa Cruz de Tenerife, Spain
- Died: 29 November 2023 (aged 80); Villajoyosa, Spain
- Other name: Vicky Leyton
- Occupations: Dancer; choreographer; illusionist
- Years active: c. 1975–2015
- Known for: Vaginal magic show

Victoria María Aragüés Gadea (15 April 1943 – 29 November 2023), also known as Vicky Leyton and professionally as Sticky Vicky, was a Spanish ballet dancer and illusionist known for her vaginal magic show. Her career spanned almost 50 years, with her final performance taking place in autumn 2015.

== Early life ==
Born in Santa Cruz de Tenerife on 15 April 1943, Leyton moved to Barcelona with her mother when her father left the family. She studied classical ballet for 15 years, later working as a dancer. With her sister, a contortionist, she performed in a musical dance show. A businessman gave her the stage name of Vicky Leyton, by which she was known for the rest of her life. Leyton later managed El Molino, a theatre on the Avinguda del Paral·lel in Barcelona.

== Magic show ==
After the death of Francisco Franco and the easing of sexual censorship, Leyton experienced difficulties; the public wanted more sexually explicit shows, and employers began to hire foreigners willing to perform nude. A magician suggested that she perform a magic act by removing unusual objects from her vagina. After practicing with simple objects (such as handkerchiefs), Vicky premiered her show in Barcelona cabarets. The show was successful, and she performed in cities in northern Spain and many variety theatres abroad.

At the beginning of the 1980s, following her sister's advice, Leyton moved to Benidorm on the Mediterranean coast. Although she intended to take a break after her career declined, her sister convinced her to perform at a hotel. Leyton's show was successful and she decided to stay in Benidorm, partially due to its influx of tourists.

Sticky Vicky's show began with her undressing slowly to background music. She later appeared to pull several objects from her vagina, including ping-pong balls, eggs, handkerchiefs, sausages, razor blades, and machetes. The lights dimmed, and Vicky pulled out a lit lightbulb. She concluded her act by opening a bottle of beer with her vagina, pouring it on the stage. Leyton did not characterise herself or the show as pornographic: "To do what I do you must have a lot of delicacy. It is necessary to give it a touch of elegance".

Vicky generally appeared six times a night, six nights a week.

In 2001, Vicky sued a fellow performer, María Rosa Pereira (known as "Sexy Bárbara") for using the stage name Sticky Vicky. María Rosa, who performed a similar show, had registered the name that Vicky had used for many years. Although Vicky won in the Benidorm court, the ruling was overturned on appeal by the Audiencia Provincial of Alicante, which ruled that the name could eventually be protected as a choreographic work. According to a 2007 review in the Spanish national newspaper El País, her act had been seen by more than six million tourists and many other people.

In 2009, the Audiencia Provincial of Valencia determined that María Rosa had acted in bad faith and generated confusion by registering the name, and awarded Vicky the legal trademark for her stage name.

She performed her last show in autumn 2015, several days before a hip operation. In February 2016, she was diagnosed with uterine cancer and announced her retirement at age 72. Never married, she had one son, Eduardo Romero Aragüés, and one daughter, María Gadea Aragüés. María, who saw the show for the first time at age 13, later decided to follow in her mother's footsteps.

== Legacy ==
Her age and the tenure of her show made Vicky a living Benidorm legend for some British tourists and Icelandic students. Leyton, surprised by her success, wrote on her webpage: "I never thought I could be on a stage at my age, and it is all thanks to the English public".

Vicky was a supporting character in the first episode of the third series of the British TV sitcom Benidorm.

== Death ==
On 29 November 2023, Leyton's daughter confirmed that Vicky Leyton had died that morning of heart failure at Villajoyosa Hospital, aged 80.
