= Elsie Kelly =

English actress (1936–2026)

- Kelly as Noreen Maltby on Benidorm
- Born: Elsie Norma Kelly; 7 June 1936; Dovecot, Liverpool, Lancashire, England
- Died: 21 April 2026 (aged 89); Birkenhead, Cheshire, England
- Occupation: Actress
- Years active: 1973–2024
- Spouse: Gordon Hall (m. 1967; died 2023)
- Children: 2

Elsie Norma Hall (née Kelly; 7 June 1936 – 21 April 2026) was an English actress. With a career spanning five decades, she appeared in various television shows including Crossroads, The Famous Five and Harry and the Wrinklies, before taking on the role of Noreen Maltby on the ITV sitcom Benidorm (2007–2012, 2015–2018).

== Early life ==
Elsie Norma Kelly was born on 7 June 1936 in Dovecot, Liverpool, Lancashire to Evelyn (née Hogg) and Denis Kelly, the alderman of Bootle Council. As a child, she would sing in bomb shelters during the World War II. She trained at the Elliott-Clarke School of Dance and Dramatic Art and whilst working as a secretary at Waterloo Hospital, Crosby, sang with local amateur operatic societies.

== Career ==
Kelly became Director of the Birkenhead Operatic Society Trust in 1973, Throughout her time with the company, she directed various productions in the Liverpool Empire, Liverpool Royal Court, the Floral Pavilion in New Brighton and the Gladstone Theatre Port Sunlight. Productions include Annie, 42nd Street, Oliver, The Sound of Music, The Full Monty, Hello Dolly, Crazy for you, The Scarlet Pimpernel, and Jekyll and Hyde. Kelly announced her retirement from the company in 2019.

In 1979, Kelly made her television debut appearing in the ITV soap opera Crossroads, in which she portrayed cleaner and gossip Mrs Tardebigge, a role which she played until the soap's cancellation in 1988. Kelly also appeared in an episode of Bread.

Following a gap from television work, Kelly appeared in the film Intimate Relations in 1996 and then returned to television to play Joan, the cook in the television adaptation of The Famous Five for a number of episodes between 1995 and 1997. This was followed by her portrayal of Mrs Humphries in The Ghost Hunter in 2000 and Florrie in Harry and the Wrinklies.

In 2007, Kelly joined the original cast of the ITV comedy series Benidorm, portraying the character Noreen Maltby, the mother of Geoff (Johnny Vegas). Kelly was initially only contracted for the first series with the character set to be killed off, however following the development of the relationship between the characters, the storyline was rewritten and Kelly portrayed the role over the next decade, appearing as a regular from series 1 to 5 and again from series 7 to 10. In series 10, Kelly also played Noreen's identical twin sister Doreen in a dual role.

She also appeared as Mrs. Hargreaves in Coronation Street for 2 episodes in 2011, and appeared in an episode of Skins.

Kelly made an appearance in "Nana's Party", the fifth episode of the second series of the British anthology series Inside No. 9 as the role of Maggie.

== Personal life and death ==
Kelly married Gordon Hall in 1967 and they had two sons together. Hall died in 2023.

Kelly died following a short illness on 21 April 2026, aged 89. Several tributes were paid to her, including from Benidorm writer Derren Litten who described her as "one of the best loved characters in the show and certainly one of the most beloved cast members" adding that her "acting abilities and comic genius were so natural they were almost taken for granted." Johnny Vegas, who played her on-screen son in Benidorm said Kelly was a "mother figure to him, on and off screen, and guided him through many highs and lows whilst overseas together" [...] adding that she "made going into work a true joy".

== Filmography ==
Year	Title	Role	Notes
1979–1988	Crossroads	Mrs. Tardebigge	Regular role
1988	Bread	Lady in Street	1 episode
1995–1997	The Famous Five	Joan	Recurring role
1996	Intimate Relations	Enid	Film role
1999–2002	Harry and the Wrinklies	Aunt Florrie	Regular role
2000	The Ghost Hunter	Mrs. Humphries	Recurring role
2007	Skins	Lovely Old Lady	1 episode
2007–2008	The Peter Serafinowicz Show	Various	2 episodes
2007–2012, 2015–2018	Benidorm	Noreen Maltby / Doreen	Main role; dual role as Doreen in series 10
2009	Occupation	Dorothy Ferguson	1 episode
2011	Late Bloomers	A Grey Panther	Film role
2011	Coronation Street	Mrs. Hargreaves	2 episodes
2011	All Star Family Fortunes	Herself	Guest; 1 episode
2015, 2024	Inside No. 9	Maggie / Party Guest	2 episodes: "Nana's Party" (2015), "Plodding On" (2024)
2016	Brief Encounters	Estelle	1 episode
2017	Benidorm: 10 Years on Holiday	Herself	Documentary
