= Hannah Hobley =

English actress and singer

- Born: 9 October 1988 (age 38); Burnley, Lancashire, England
- Occupation: Actress
- Years active: 2005–2010, 2017–present
- Spouse: Nathan Smith
- Children: 1

Hannah Hobley (born 9 October 1988) is an English actress and classical singer. She is best known for playing Chantelle "Telle" Garvey in ITV's Benidorm. She also appeared as Bertha in Cranford on BBC One in the UK.

== Early life ==
Hannah was born in Burnley and lived in Colne, Lancashire during her early life, attending Ss John Fisher and Thomas More RC High School. She was Soprano 1 in the Hallé Choir for two years, including performing at 2005 BBC Proms at the Royal Albert Hall.

== Acting career ==
Television

- Benidorm (2007–2009) as Chantelle Garvey
- Cranford (2007, 2009) as Bertha

Stage

- Dick Whittington (2017–2018) as Alice Fitzwarren at Gracie Fields Theatre, Rochdale.
- Westernized (2018–2019) as Layla Layloo in an immersive theatre production (Death By Pie), Manchester.
- Harriet, Harry & The Pirates (2018–2019) as Harriet Pippin (Death By Pie), Manchester.
- Sleeping Beauty (2018–2019) as Fairy Chantelle at Gracie Fields Theatre, Rochdale.
- Sleeping Beauty (2018–2019) as Fairy Fortitude at Northwich Memorial Court, Northwich.
- Aladdin (2019–2020) as Fairy Chantelle at Gracie Fields Theatre, Rochdale.
- Beauty and the Beast (2022) as the evil Enchantress at Marine Hall.

== Personal life ==
On 2 August 2022, Hannah announced via Instagram her pregnancy with her first child. She gave birth in late November to a daughter named Beatrice Hobley-Smith.
