= Oliver Stokes =

English actor

- Born: 29 May 1998 (age 28); Hull, East Riding of Yorkshire, England, UK
- Occupation: Actor
- Years active: 2006–present
- Notable work: Benidorm (2007–2016)
- Children: 1

Oliver Stokes (born 29 May 1998) is an English actor. He is best known for playing the role of Michael Garvey in Benidorm from 2007 to 2015.

== Career ==
Stokes first came to prominence with his role as Michael Garvey in Derren Litten’s ITV comedy Benidorm, a role he played from 2007 to 2015. Stokes played Don Weatherby's boy in Heartbeat (2008), Nigel Clough in The Damned United (2009) and played George Davies in a 2012 episode of BBC Doctors. Alongside his Benidorm cast-family, Stokes appeared in the 2011 Christmas special of All Star Family Fortunes.

In 2017, Stokes appeared in one episode of Casualty.

== Personal life ==
Stokes has one child.

== Credits ==
Year	Title	Role	Notes
2007–2015	Benidorm	Michael Garvey	Series regular, 44 episodes (series 1–7)
2007	The Street	Lee Hanley	Series regular
2008	Heartbeat	Ben Wetherby	Episode: "You Never Can Tell"
2009	The Damned United	Nigel Clough	1 series
2011	All Star Family Fortunes	Himself	1 episode
2012	Sport Relief 2012	Michael Garvey	1 episode: Benidorm meets Britain's Got Talent
2012	Doctors	George Davies	Episode: "Responsibilities"
2013–2025	Loose Women	Himself	2 episode
2017	Casualty	Sean McKern	Episode: Do Not Stand at My Grave and Weep
