= Kenneth Du Beke =

Television show character

- Benidorm character
- First appearance: "Episode 23"; 25 February 2011
- Last appearance: "Episode 74"; 2 May 2018
- Created by: Derren Litten
- Portrayed by: Tony Maudsley

In-universe information
- Occupation: Hair stylist; Businessman
- Significant others: Denis Walker; Vladimir
- Relatives: Brenda (mother)
- Origin: Derbyshire

Kenneth Du Beke is a fictional character from the ITV comedy sitcom Benidorm, portrayed by Tony Maudsley. Kenneth first appeared in the first episode of the fourth series, first broadcast on 25 February 2011. Kenneth is introduced as an employee of Gavin Ramsbottom (Hugh Sachs), who accompanies him on holiday to Benidorm. He then decides to relocate there permanently, becoming the owner of the hair salon Blow 'n Go within the Solana resort.

His main storylines throughout his tenure include his turbulent friendship with Gavin, the opening of his own salon within the Solana, feuding with Solana manageress Joyce Temple-Savage (Sherrie Hewson), overseeing the salon become rent-free when his mother's friend Herbert (Ken Morley) buys the lease, his close, often chaotic, friendship with Liam Conroy (Adam Gillen), forming a partnership with Jacqueline Stewart (Janine Duvitski) and his former employer Troy Ganatra (Paul Bazely) to maintain control of the salon after Herbert's untimely death, his involvement in various, often dodgy, schemes to make money, his unrequited romance with sailor Vladimir (Antonio de la Cruz) and being bricked up in the salon whilst still inside.

== Creation and casting ==
Tony Maudsley was cast in the role of Kenneth Du Beke in Benidorm ahead of its fourth series, which was broadcast in 2011. He was introduced as an employee of established character Gavin Ramsbottom (Hugh Sachs), joining him on holiday in place of Gavin's husband Troy Ganatra (Paul Bazely); Bazely was unavailable for filming due to his filming commitments for Pirates of the Caribbean: On Stranger Tides. Maudlsey described Kenneth as "a larger-than-life, colourful character. He has bagged himself a free holiday and is determined to make the most of it. He loves the free cocktails and buffet. Kenneth just wants to have a good time, much to the annoyance of Gavin. He gets involved in a lot of the big comedy storylines."

Maudlsey had previously auditioned for the role of Mick Garvey in 2006. Having watched the programme since it began broadcasting, he reflected on how he gained the role of Kenneth: "I auditioned for the part of Mick [Garvey] four years ago but that role went to Steve Pemberton and rightly so. I tuned in to see how it transferred from script and continued watching, so I knew the show well. My agent called me when I was rehearsing for a play and said they were looking for someone to play Kenneth. I bombed it across London on my lunch hour. I did not know what they were looking for. There was a row of small, skinny men and I turned up, 6ft4in and 18 stone. I must have swayed them."

== Appearances ==
Kenneth holidays in Benidorm with his employer Gavin Ramsbottom (Hugh Sachs), having taken his husband Troy Ganatra's (Paul Bazely) place on the holiday due to his estranged father being on his death bed. Kenneth and Gavin have a tense relationship and are frequently shown to disagree. Gavin becomes suspicious when various holidaymakers greet Kenneth and suspects that he is engaging in prostitution. He then catches Kenneth in the act, though his theory is mistaken as Kenneth has started hairdressing from his hotel room. Following the death of Troy's father, Kenneth takes Gavin on a trip to the Benidorm museum of culture, which turns out to be closed; Gavin points out that Kenneth was using a guidebook to Benidorm published in 1999. Kenneth then tricks Gavin into going to a gay nudist beach, much to his horror. The pair row and Gavin sacks him before Kenneth resigns. The two of them later make up and support Jacqueline Stewart (Janine Duvitski), who has found out that her husband Donald Stewart (Kenny Ireland) has committed suicide at the beach.

Kenneth permanently relocates to Benidorm, setting up his own hair and beauty salon in the Solana, which he names Blow 'n Go. Kenneth clashes with new Solana manageress Joyce Temple-Savage (Sherrie Hewson), who tries to assert her authoritative managerial style and threatens to have his salon closed. Gavin assumes Troy has ended their marriage over a text message so Kenneth sets Gavin up with a waiter named Emilio and they end up sleeping together on the beach. However, it soon emerges that Troy's text was a misunderstanding, leaving Gavin feeling guilty. Kenneth is informed by Mateo Castellanos (Jake Canuso) that Joyce had the locks to the salon changed as he was weeks behind with his rent. Furious, Kenneth attacks Joyce and they have a fight around the hotel until Joyce knocks his front teeth out. They later come to an agreement and she agrees to reopen the salon. After Liam Conroy (Adam Gillen) inadvertently gives a pedicure, Kenneth hires him as his new apprentice.

Kenneth and Liam attempt to grow the salon with Kenneth attempting to promote the salon though their efforts are undermined by a series of mishaps, including a failed promotional campaign and a misunderstanding involving a client presumed dead. Kenneth is contacted by Herbert (Ken Morley), the head of the local hairdressing mafia, who wants to see him. Herbert is revealed to be an old friend of his mother and later buys the lease of the salon, deciding not to charge Kenneth any rent.

Kenneth hires a psychic medium, Psychic Sue (Amanda Barrie), who is a regular customer in the salon. She attempts to contact the ghost of Kenneth's mother Brenda though instead passes on a message from Mel Harvey (Geoffrey Hutchings), intended for the Garvey family, which confuses Kenneth because he does not know what the point of the message is. The salon illegally start offering botox sessions, much to the interest of Joyce, who books five free sessions in return for her loyalty in not passing on information about Kenneth's illegal service. After the first session, Joyce's face stiffens and she collapses in Neptune's. The next day, Kenneth sets off to find out what chemicals are in the botox given to Joyce and it is revealed that it contained drugs that are used to cause paralysis in dogs with rabies. Kenneth hires a vet to examine Joyce and she is injected to counteract the botox given by Kenneth.

Herbert's doorman Norman (Louis Emerick) returns and informs Kenneth that Herbert died in a freak hair straightening accident. He tells Kenneth that Herbert will leave all the salons he owns to Kenneth in his will. When it is revealed at Herbert's will-reading that it is in fact Norman inheriting his fortune, he charges Kenneth a hefty rent. Troy, now divorced from Gavin, and Jacqueline step in to buy the lease from Norman, and they agree a partnership with Kenneth to maintain control of the salon.

Liam discovers Kenneth living in the treatment room of the salon; Kenneth explains that he is homeless. When cutting the hair of Herbert's former dentist Stanley Keen (Nigel Havers), Stanley offers to purchase Herbert's teeth that he left Kenneth in his will. Stanley attempts to con Kenneth for financial gain and it soon emerges that there is real gold on the interior of the teeth. Kenneth cashes out on them and later agrees to become flatmates with Liam. Whilst waiting for Jacqueline at the airport, Kenneth is mistaken by a holidaymaker as a taxi driver. After realising the amount of money he can earn, Kenneth begins illegal taxi runs from the salon. Troy, who has set up a webcam within the salon, begins messaging Kenneth, who suspects that someone is acting as an informant to Troy. Troy is informed by Joyce about Kenneth's taxi business and confronts him. Kenneth argues with his friends, including Liam over a disagreement regarding their living arrangements. Kenneth later decides to stop his taxi runs and reconciles with the group. He recognises a guest named Malcolm Barrett (Mark Heap), believing him to be named Denis Walker, his first sexual encounter. Malcolm repeatedly denies Kenneth's accusations though is exposed when a matching tattoo the pair got together is revealed.

Kenneth swims from Peacock Island to Benidorm after Joyce's wedding to Monty Staines (John Challis). While Kenneth is missing, Stanley returns and claims to Jacqueline that he is an old friend of Kenneth. Jacqueline lets him turn Blow 'n Go into a dental surgery, which makes Kenneth furious upon his return, and he turfs out Stanley, who attempts to remove his teeth as revenge. Kenneth explains his absence, revealing he was rescued by a passing boat, piloted by a handsome gay man named Vladimir (Antonio de la Cruz). After entering a romance with him, Kenneth soon tires of Vladimir, but he is completely obsessed with Kenneth and refuses his rebuff. To get rid of Vlad, Kenneth pretends that he is in a heterosexual marriage to Sam Wood (Shelley Longworth) and that they have children together. They put on a show in front of Vlad, snogging exaggeratedly. When he has a moment alone with Kenneth after this, Vlad states that they cannot be together and leaves. The entrance to Blow 'n Go is mistakenly bricked up and painted over by construction workers who had no idea Kenneth was inside. Trapped inside, Kenneth has a severe breakdown. By the time Liam, Jacqueline and Sam realise he is inside and break down the wall, he has already escaped via a vent, bursting through the stage at Neptune's Bar. He threatens to take Joyce to court for attempted murder for trapping him in the Solana.

== Development ==
During filming for the fifth series, Maudsley had undergone dental work which left him temporarily without his front teeth. This circumstance was written into the scene after series creator Derren Litten recognised its comedic potential and suggested using it in the show. As such, Litten incorporated a fight scene between Kenneth and Joyce Temple-Savage (Sherrie Hewson), where Kenneth is shown to have broken his teeth. Maudsley stated, "By the time I came to film I was halfway through having implant surgery to have my two teeth replaced. Derren phoned me up and said, 'Do you mind if I write it into the show?'. What you see me spitting out of my mouth is half a piece of chewing gum."

The character develops a close comic friendship with Liam Conroy (Adam Gillen) when the latter begins working for Kenneth at his salon, which has been described as a "flamboyant double act" dynamic on screen. Their relationship combines friendship with frequent arguments and reconciliations, reflecting what Gillen characterised as "a very tumultuous relationship," while Maudsley similarly noted that the pair "fall out and get back together about four times." Off-screen, the actors have spoken positively about their rapport, with Maudsley remarking "I missed him last year. Wasn’t the same without him," following Gillen's brief departure from the programme after the seventh series.

== In other media ==
In 2012, Maudsley appeared in his role of Kenneth for Sport Relief 2012, in a sketch with fellow Benidorm co-stars Steve Pemberton, Jake Canuso, Oliver Stokes and Adam Gillen. It situated their characters in a fictional audition for ITV talent competition Britain's Got Talent, performing "Let's Get Ready to Rhumble".

Maudsley was named as one of six of the main characters to appear in Benidorm Live, a major theatre adaption of the programme. Beginning in September 2018, over 200 shows were scheduled to take place in various locations throughout the United Kingdom and Ireland. Reflecting on the transition from television to stage, Maudsley stated, "We have this brilliant revolving set, featuring the reception, salon, even a swimming pool – although it's not one I'd try to dive into! The second half of the show is purely Neptune's and the audience will be part of it – we might even bring some on stage for karaoke. Everyone will be up on their feet by the end. One of the big differences between the stage show and TV programme is that characters will be bursting into song. So not only have you got one of the best episodes Derren has ever written, but you also have a play and a musical. We've been blown away by the response so far – the tour was only supposed to be four months but it's been doubled to eight."

== Reception ==
Kenneth has been a focal point of critical discussion surrounding Benidorm, with particular attention given to Maudsley's performance in the series. Critics have frequently highlighted Maudsley's comic delivery and screen presence, with Attitude describing his portrayal as "comic genius" and noting that he brings depth and charisma to a role that "could easily be a mean-spirited stereotype", instead imbuing Kenneth with "sass, fight and well-timed innuendo". At the same time, broader television reviews have situated Kenneth within the show's increasingly exaggerated comedic style; Sam Wollaston characterised Benidorm as relying on "farts, innuendo and… an all-inclusive mess", a tone reflected in Kenneth's flamboyant personality and salon-based storylines. While some retrospective commentary has suggested that such larger-than-life characterisation contributed to perceptions of the series becoming more repetitive and crude in later years, Kenneth himself has remained widely regarded as a standout figure, with Maudsley's performance consistently cited as a key factor in the character's popularity and durability within the ensemble.

== See also ==
- List of Benidorm characters
