= Gavin Ramsbottom =

Television show character

- Benidorm character
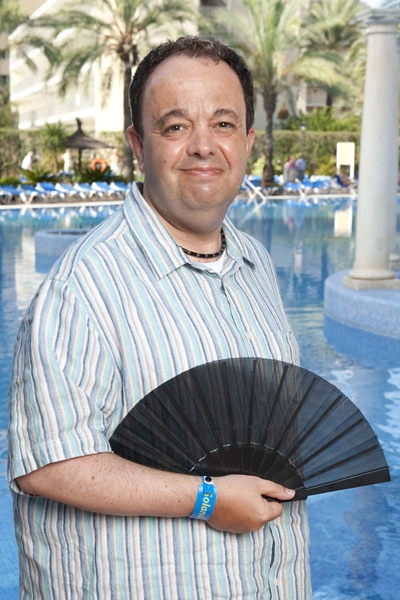
- First appearance: "Episode 1"; 1 February 2007
- Last appearance: "Episode 35"; 6 April 2012
- Created by: Derren Litten
- Portrayed by: Hugh Sachs

In-universe information
- Occupation: Hairdresser; Salon owner
- Spouses: Troy Ganatra
- Significant others: Emilio
- Relatives: Dorothy (mother)
- Origin: Derbyshire

Gavin Ramsbottom is a fictional character from the ITV comedy sitcom Benidorm, portrayed by Hugh Sachs. Gavin first appeared in the pilot episode of the series, first broadcast on 1 February 2007. Gavin is introduced as a hairdresser holidaying in Benidorm with his partner Troy (Paul Bazely). His main storylines throughout his tenure include discovering Troy's one-night stand with barman Mateo Castellanos (Jake Canuso), entering into a civil partnership with Troy, his friendships with Donald (Kenny Ireland) and Jacqueline Stewart (Janine Duvitski), supporting Troy when he regains contact with his son Jamie, his turbulent friendship with Kenneth Du Beke (Tony Maudsley), struggling to deal with a massive toll on his relationship with Troy and having a one-night stand with barman Emilio (Stefano Braschi).

Gavin and Troy were the first openly homosexual characters to appear in Benidorm. Sachs remained in the programme for the first five series, appearing in 34 episodes. Sachs opted to leave the role after the fifth series to pursue other projects.

== Creation and casting ==
Hugh Sachs was cast in the role of Gavin Ramsbottom, becoming a member of the original cast of Benidorm for its first series. The character was created to be part of the show's first homosexual couple, partnering with Troy (Paul Bazely). Litten opted to build the dynamic between Gavin and Troy to envisage his own personal relationship with his then-partner.

Sachs left the role in 2011 after completing filming for the fifth series, opting to pursue other projects.

== Appearances ==
Gavin holidays in Benidorm with his partner Troy (Paul Bazely). Although Troy relishes in taking advantage of their cheap all-inclusive holiday, Gavin is disgusted by the guests and deems himself above them. Gavin is furious when he discovers that Troy has had a one-night stand with Solana barman Mateo Castellanos (Jake Canuso). Donald Stewart (Kenny Ireland), a fellow holidaymaker whom the couple have befriended, talks to Gavin and talks him round into being civil with Troy and trying to move past his mistake. Troy later proposes to Gavin and reveals he has booked a civil partnership ceremony for when they return home.

Despite Gavin's reservations, Troy convinces him to return the following year. Gavin is joined on holiday by his eccentric, flirtatious mother Dorothy (Margi Clarke). Because she had Gavin at a very young age, they interact more like competitive siblings than mother and son. She creates chaos by sneaking around the hotel without an all-inclusive wristband before abruptly vanishing, disappointing Gavin. Troy later reveals to Donald and his wife Jacqueline Stewart (Janine Duvitski) that Dorothy has severe commitment issues. Gavin and Troy contribute to saving Madge Harvey (Sheila Reid) and Janice Garvey (Siobhan Finneran) from a criminal armed with a gun, who is keeping them hostage. Gavin confronts him and faints when he is threatened with the gun, before they are rescued by Mel Harvey (Geoffrey Hutchings).

When Gavin answers Troy's phone to receive a message, he is suspicious and heartbroken when a young male claims that he loves Troy. Whilst they attend a show at The Benidorm Palace, Gavin confronts Troy, who reveals that it was his son Jamie, who was conceived during a past relationship before he came out as gay. Gavin supports Troy and embraces Jamie into their lives, suggesting that they should invite him and his girlfriend to join them on holiday. Upon meeting at the airport, Jamie hugs Gavin, who breaks down into tears.

Troy stays home to care for his estranged father, who has recently regained contact and is dying. As a result, Gavin holidays with their employee Kenneth Du Beke (Tony Maudsley). Their personalities immediately clash and their friendship is risked when Kenneth takes him to a gay nudist beach. Gavin demands that Kenneth move out of the apartment immediately and sacks him from his salon. They support Jacqueline when Donald goes missing, unaware that he has faked his death as part of an insurance scam. When Troy joins Gavin in Benidorm, he reveals that his late father has left his entire estate to him, including 100 houses and a large amount of cash.

Gavin returns to Benidorm to visit Kenneth, who has recently relocated to Benidorm and opened a new salon within the Solana resort. He informs Kenneth that he and Troy have been experiencing difficulties in their relationship, causing by the stress of Troy managing his new property empire. Gavin mistakenly thinks that Troy has broken up with him when he sends him a text, intended for a tenant. Kenneth organises him to go on a date with local barman Emilio (Stefano Braschi). They have a one-night stand on the beach with Kenneth discovering them as he searches for Gavin to reveal the misunderstanding with Troy. When Gavin reveals his infidelity to Troy, he is forgiven, with Troy considering his previous liaison with Mateo to now make them "even".

Troy reveals to Kenneth and Jacqueline that he and Gavin have split off-screen. Kenneth later contacts Gavin, discovering that he is travelling in Venice alone.

== Development ==
Gavin is devoted to Troy. He's been in a relationship with Troy for 15 years when they first arrive. The pair have a successful hair salon in Derby. In the earlier series, the catty couple could usually be found passing judgement on their fellow holidaymakers, before regaling their clients with the gossip over a blow-dry back home in their hair salon.

— British Comedy Guide on Benidorm

Discussing the success of Benidorm, Sachs analysed how viewers recognise themselves within the characters: "I think people just recognise themselves — we don't behave very well on holiday as a nation and I don't think there's that many sitcoms about the vast majority of people. Lots of people go on holiday and have rows in public". Evaluating the characterisation of Gavin, Sachs said: "He'd like just to be on a sunlounger enjoying himself, but he gets sidetracked by all these bizarre people".

The relationship between Gavin and husband Troy (Paul Bazely) was a focal element of his characterisation. Previewing conflict between the couple in the third series, Sachs teased: "For once, we have quite a serious storyline about an old lover declaring his love for me - but what's hilarious is that it all blows up and we go to this nightclub trying to have a conversation and Madge and Mel are trampolining in the background, and Madge has had a makeover. It's extraordinary — it was very difficult to film and to keep a straight face!" Subsequently in the fifth series, their relationship was further tested when a misunderstanding leads Gavin to believe their relationship is over and he commits adultery: "This time, his partner Troy has stayed at home and, when Gavin mistakenly thinks he's been dumped, he has a one-night stand".

In the fourth series, Gavin was situated as holidaying with his work colleague Kenneth Du Beke (Tony Maudsley), in the absence of Troy. Delving into the contrast between Gavin and Kenneth, Maudsley commented: "Kenneth just wants to have a good time, much to the annoyance of Gavin".

== Reception ==
The relationship between Gavin and Troy was praised by Olivia Burke of the LADbible Group, who commented on the humorous nature of their pairing: "[Troy Ramsbottom]'s comical escapades with his former husband Gavin Ramsbottom cracked viewers up on a regular basis". Critics have noted that the couple were displayed as the most sarcastic and relatable couple, often serving as the steady, "normal" anchors of the show amid the chaotic, over-the-top antics of the Solana resort.

== See also ==
- List of Benidorm characters
