= Benidorm series 5 =

Fifth season of TV show Benidorm

Benidorm
- Series 5
- Starring: Jake Canuso; Janine Duvitski; Siobhan Finneran; Adam Gillen; Tim Healy; Kenny Ireland; Elsie Kelly; Shelley Longworth; Tony Maudsley; Sheila Reid; Hugh Sachs; Michelle Butterly; Sherrie Hewson; Oliver Stokes
- No. of episodes: 7

Release
- Original network: ITV
- Original release: 24 February – 6 April 2012

Series chronology
- ← Previous; Series 4 Next → Series 6

The fifth series of the ITV television series Benidorm, which is a sitcom set in an all-inclusive holiday resort (The Solana) in Benidorm, Spain, began broadcasting on 24 February 2012, consisting of seven episodes. The series was directed by both John Henderson and Sandy Johnson, though was written by Derren Litten, Steve Pemberton and Neil Fitzmaurice. The series saw the returns of Garvey family, consisting of Mick (Steve Pemberton), Janice (Siobhan Finneran), Michael Garvey (Oliver Stokes) and Janice's mother Madge Barron (Sheila Reid); swingers Donald (Kenny Ireland) and Jacqueline Stewart (Janine Duvitski); Noreen Maltby (Elsie Kelly); hairdressers Gavin Ramsbottom (Hugh Sachs) and Kenneth Du Beke (Tony Maudsley); Sam Wood (Shelley Longworth) and Solana staff Mateo Castellanos (Jake Canuso), Les/Lesley Conroy (Tim Healy) and Liam Conroy (Adam Gillen). Sherrie Hewson and Michelle Butterly joined the cast of Joyce Temple-Savage, the new Solana manageress, and Trudy, the new holiday companion of Sam, respectively. Paul Bazely, Kathryn Drysdale and Selina Griffiths did not return; Crissy Rock did not return either, though did make a brief return during the sixth episode.

Initially, Litten did not want to write a fifth series, believing that the fourth series had allowed the programme to conclude on a high. However, due to popular demand, he agreed to write further episodes, with cast member Steve Pemberton, as well as Neil Fitzmaurice, agreeing to help him write episodes and storylines. Overall, the series received an average viewership of 7.06 million, with the opening episode receiving 6.84 million viewers. The series concluded on 6 April 2012, with the series finale attracting 5.66 million.

== Cast ==
=== Main ===
- Sheila Reid as Madge Harvey
- Siobhan Finneran as Janice Garvey
- Oliver Stokes as Michael Garvey
- Steve Pemberton as Mick Garvey (episodes 2–7)
- Janine Duvitski as Jacqueline Stewart
- Kenny Ireland as Donald Stewart
- Jake Canuso as Mateo Castellanos
- Elsie Kelly as Noreen Maltby
- Hugh Sachs as Gavin Ramsbottom
- Tim Healy as Les/Lesley Conroy
- Adam Gillen as Liam Conroy
- Tony Maudsley as Kenneth Du Beke
- Shelley Longworth as Sam Wood
- Sherrie Hewson as Joyce Temple-Savage
- Michelle Butterly as Trudy

=== Recurring ===
- Asa Elliott as himself
- Alba Ortega as Carmen
- Dhaffer L'Abidine as Mohammed

=== Guest ===
- Matthew Kelly as Cyril Babcock
- Crissy Rock as Janey York
- Michael Fenton Stevens as Sir Henry

== Episodes ==
| No. overall | Episode | Directed by | Written by | Original release date | UK viewers (millions) |
|---|---|---|---|---|---|
| 29 | "Episode 1" | John Henderson | Derren Litten | 24 February 2012 | 7.72 (Note: 6.48 million on ITV, 754,000 on ITV HD, 491,000 on ITV +1) |
Chaos reigns at the Solana Hotel as Mateo and Les find it hard to keep control. Les/Leslie’s son Liam is now working as the hotel’s caretaker. Meanwhile, some Solana guests (including Gavin and Noreen) are not happy, after learning their luggage has been mysteriously lost on the coach. Back at the pool bar, Spanish barman Mateo ends up teaching Liam the art of chatting up pretty women. Kenneth and Gavin comfort lately widowed Jacqueline, but get a nasty shock when they think they have seen the ghost of Donald. Joyce Temple-Savage (Sherrie Hewson), the new manager of the hotel, secretly watches everything that is going on, as she is determined she can earn the Solana a 4-star rating. Wild holidaymaker Sam is back, this time with a new Liverpudlian friend, Trudy.
| 30 | "Episode 2" | John Henderson | Derren Litten | 2 March 2012 | 7.42 (Note: 6.21 million on ITV, 627,000 on ITV HD, 582,000 on ITV +1) |
New manager Joyce organises a dance competition for the guests, and everyone is eager to take part - to win a €100 voucher for Kenneth's salon. Rehearsals are supervised by her old flame Cyril Babcock (Matthew Kelly), an ageing playboy, whose impatience with the talentless contestants leads to a dance-off with Mateo. At the new Solana salon, Kenneth hires an assistant - but her minimal knowledge of hairdressing and English leads to an unfortunate accident with her first client. Kenneth also tries to cheer up Gavin, who is missing Troy. At the pool bar, Janice is shocked to see her stalker, Jack (Elliott Jordan), but he pretends not to remember her.
| 31 | "Episode 3" | John Henderson | Steve Pemberton | 9 March 2012 | 7.56 (Note: 6.28 million on ITV, 728,000 on ITV HD, 548,000 on ITV +1) |
Mick is not happy that his brother Pete is due in Benidorm with their dad for a stag party. Thinking that Troy has broken up with him, Gavin agrees to go on a date with young Spanish waiter Emilio. After Kenneth discovers that Gavin has misunderstood a text from Troy, he attempts to stop him from making a huge mistake - but is he too late? Meanwhile, Trudy comes up with an idea to try to get intimate with Mateo, but things don't go according to plan.
| 32 | "Episode 4" | John Henderson | Neil Fitzmaurice | 16 March 2012 | 7.06 (Note: 5.99 million on ITV, 636,000 on ITV HD, 430,000 on ITV +1) |
The Garveys have heard that there have been organ thieves around Benidorm, but it doesn't worry them that much. Meanwhile, Madge has been kidnapped on her way to the supermarket, which Michael witnessed - but can the Garveys save her in time? Back around the poolside, Sam bets Trudy €20 to act ladylike until midnight - no farting, swearing, burping or violence. Meanwhile, new hotel manager Joyce invites Costa Class Magazine's hotel critic and instructs Mateo to cook an authentic paella for him - but will a snag with the ingredients change the dish altogether?
| 33 | "Episode 5" | John Henderson | Steve Pemberton | 23 March 2012 | 6.41 (Note: 5.32 million on ITV, 544,000 on ITV HD, 544,000 on ITV +1) |
The British Olympic Synchronised Swimming team are in the local area to train, and Joyce has managed to persuade them to stay at the Solana. Hazel, the team's strict coach, is not impressed by the facilities, but agrees to Joyce's idea for a gala display in the hotel pool. Liam ends up escorting the girls on a tour along the coast - but was it actually a sightseeing trip? Madge is keen on Mohammed, the son of a wealthy property developer who knew Mel - but Mick and Janice are surprised when they find out that she wants to marry him. Back on the boat, Liam is unable to persuade the young swimmers to head back to the Solana. Do they mess up the gala performance?
| 34 | "Episode 6" | Sandy Johnson | Steve Pemberton | 30 March 2012 | 6.90 (Note: 5.83 million on ITV, 650,000 on ITV HD, 421,000 on ITV +1) |
Madge is getting ready for her wedding, but after Mick and Michael find Mohammed in a sports bar and watching him in a commercial, they think that he is not quite what he seems. Joyce believes that somebody in the hotel is giving negative stories about the Solana to the local press, and she recruits Donald and Jacqueline to spy on the staff. A trick is played on Sam by Liam and Trudy, and they convince her that she had unprotected sex with Liam while she was drunk.
| 35 | "Episode 7" | Sandy Johnson | Derren Litten | 6 April 2012 | 6.37 (Note: 5.66 million on ITV, 707,000 on ITV HD) |
Mick finally admits to his family that they are broke, when all the uninsured sunbed shops have burnt down. Joyce's eviction of Kenneth for non payment of rent backfires, when she needs him to impress the guest she believes to be the hotel assessor. Meanwhile, the British consul who convicted Donald asks for his help just as Donald's old prison enemy turns up at the Solana. Joyce makes an offer the hotel assessor cannot refuse so that the Solana can finally get its fourth star.
Sport Relief sketch (2012)
| N–A | "Benidorm's Got Talent" | Johnathan Bullen | Derren Litten | 23 March 2012 | 5.92 |
Mick has formed a boy band, consisting of Kenneth, Mateo, Michael and Liam. He brings them to the Britain's Got Talent auditions, in which he hopes the judges will be impressed with by their performance.

== Production ==
Creator Derren Litten opted against writing any new episodes beyond the fourth series, commenting, "I'm really looking forward to Series 4 although it is with mixed emotions because, for me, it is the end of my Benidorm journey. I can't begin to tell you what this show means to me, it has changed my life in so many ways. Not least the amazing friends I have made along the way. I won't be writing any more episodes of Benidorm, for me the story of the Garveys and all of the other characters I created ends at Episode 6 of Series 4." However, Litten reversed his decision and agreed to write a fifth series after cast member Steve Pemberton agreed to contribute to three episodes. The fifth series was officially confirmed by ITV in April 2011.

In May 2011, it was announced that Crissy Rock, who portrayed Solana manageress Janey Yorke, had been written out of the programme to make place for a storyline seeing the Solana under new management. She did, however, make a brief appearance in the fifth series. That August, Sherrie Hewson was confirmed to be joining the cast, taking on the role of Joyce Temple-Savage, the new manageress of the Solana. An admirer of the programme, Hewson stated, "I am absolutely thrilled about joining Benidorm, I have watched and loved it from the very beginning. I am so excited about being part of such an iconic show and working with an amazing cast. My character is so brilliantly written that I can't wait to start filming." Michelle Butterly was cast as Trudy, the new holiday companion of established character Sam Wood. Describing her character, Butterly commented, "Trudy's not a girl to get the wrong side of. As you've probably seen, she gets to head-butt and whack quite a few people. She's bad ass! If you cross her she can be quite violent!"

== Home media ==
The fifth series was released on a two-disc DVD on 15 April 2012 in the United Kingdom. The set also includes 15 minutes of behind-the-scenes footage, a selection of outtakes and audio commentaries.

The fifth series first became available for streaming through Netflix in the United Kingdom on 1 October 2015.

== Ratings ==
| Episode | Running time (exc. adverts) | Original air date (United Kingdom) | ITV SD ratings (millions) | ITV HD ratings (millions) | ITV +1 ratings (millions) | Weekly rank | Rating increase / decrease |
|---|---|---|---|---|---|---|---|
| 1 | 46 minutes | 24 February 2012 | 6.48 | 0.75 | 0.49 | 14 | N/A |
| 2 | 46 minutes | 2 March 2012 | 6.21 | 0.62 | 0.58 | 14 | Decrease |
| 3 | 46 minutes | 9 March 2012 | 6.28 | 0.73 | 0.55 | 14 | Increase |
| 4 | 46 minutes | 16 March 2012 | 5.99 | 0.64 | 0.43 | 14 | Decrease |
| 5 | 46 minutes | 23 March 2012 | 5.32 | 0.54 | 0.54 | 16 | Decrease |
| 6 | 46 minutes | 30 March 2012 | 5.83 | 0.65 | 0.42 | 14 | Increase |
| 7 | 46 minutes | 6 April 2012 | 5.66 | 0.71 | N/A | 13 | Decrease |
| Series average | | 2012 | 7.06 | 0.66 | 0.50 | — | |
