= Joyce Temple-Savage =

Television show character

- Benidorm character
- First appearance: "Episode 29"; 24 February 2012
- Last appearance: "Episode 74"; 2 May 2018
- Created by: Derren Litten
- Portrayed by: Sherrie Hewson

In-universe information
- Occupation: Hotel manageress
- Spouses: Monty Staines (m. 2017)
- Significant others: Cyril Babcock

Joyce Temple-Savage is a fictional character from the ITV comedy sitcom Benidorm, portrayed by Sherrie Hewson. Joyce first appeared in the first episode of the fifth series, first broadcast on 24 February 2012. Her creation and casting were announced in August 2011. Joyce is introduced as the new manageress of the Solana resort in Benidorm, vowing to improve its fortunes with an ambition to upgrade it to a four-star hotel.

Across her tenure, Joyce is depicted as a manager whose attempts to impose order and prestige are continually undermined by staff errors, challenging guests and her own turbulent romantic entanglements.

== Creation and casting ==
In August 2012, it was announced that Sherrie Hewson had joined the cast of Benidorm, taking on the role of Joyce Temple-Savage, the new manageress of the Solana. An admirer of the programme, Hewson stated, "I am absolutely thrilled about joining Benidorm, I have watched and loved it from the very beginning. I am so excited about being part of such an iconic show and working with an amazing cast. My character is so brilliantly written that I can't wait to start filming." Her character replaced Janey Yorke (Crissy Rock), with Rock being written out after the fourth series to make place for a storyline seeing the Solana under new management.

== Appearances ==
Joyce is introduced as an ambitious and image-conscious hotel manager, determined to modernise the Solana and elevate it to four-star status. Her strict policies and belief in her own professional expertise, often exaggerated through claims of high-level industry experience, immediately place her at odds with both staff and guests. Her managerial style frequently leads to conflict, particularly with employees such as Kenneth Du Beke (Tony Maudsley), whose laziness and independent business ventures she repeatedly threatens to shut down.

Throughout her tenure, Joyce becomes embroiled in numerous comedic and dramatic storylines. Early in her time at the Solana, she develops an infatuation with barman Mateo Castellanos (Jake Canuso) after misinterpreting his intentions, only to be humiliated when his deception is revealed. She later rekindles a past romance with Cyril Babcock (Matthew Kelly), though this relationship ends abruptly following a scandal involving food poisoning at the hotel.

Joyce's personal life becomes more prominent in later series. She begins a relationship with Monty Staines (John Challis), a conman who initially arrives at the resort as part of a fraudulent holiday scheme. Despite his dubious background and repeated employment failures, including an unsuccessful stint as the Solana's entertainments manager, the two eventually marry, though their relationship is frequently strained by financial difficulties and Monty's unreliable behaviour.

In addition to her romantic entanglements, Joyce is frequently involved in disputes with guests and staff, often escalating into farcical situations. Her rivalry with Kenneth culminates in a physical altercation, during which she breaks his front teeth, exemplifying the exaggerated comedic tone of her storylines. Despite her often abrasive personality, Joyce remains a central figure at the Solana, consistently attempting, if rarely succeeding, to impose order and professionalism on the chaotic resort environment.

== Development ==
A recurring element of Joyce's storylines is her long-running feud with salon manager Kenneth Du Beke (Tony Maudsley), which became one of the show's most consistent comic rivalries. Their antagonistic relationship, centred on Joyce's repeated attempts to discipline or dismiss Kenneth and his efforts to undermine her authority, was frequently highlighted in television listings and reviews as a defining feature of the Solana's staff dynamic. Their conflict escalates into physical confrontation in the final episode of the fifth series, culminating in Joyce knocking out Kenneth's teeth during a fight at the Solana. Discussing the fight scene, Hewson stated, "I remember Tony saying, 'You're actually doing it for real Sherrie. You're actually thumping me in the face'. And I went, 'I'm really sorry but I don't know how to pull it'. I couldn't help it because I really wanted to smack him because I thought, 'It will look so much better if I smack him'." Maudsley had previously undergone dental work which left him temporarily without his front teeth with this circumstance being written into the scene for comedic effect.

Joyce's personal life is developed through a series of romantic storylines, beginning with the introduction of Cyril Babcock (Matthew Kelly), a former partner. Cyril is described as an "old flame" who reenters Joyce's life while assisting with a dance competition at the Solana in the fifth series. The storyline emphasises both comedic tension and emotional history, as Cyril is depicted as an "ageing star" whose behaviour complicates proceedings at the hotel. Kelly reprised the role in the sixth series for a short stint, where their relationship is briefly reignited until an incident involving Cyril serving contaminated food jeopardises Joyce's position as manager, leading to his departure.

Her relationship with Monty Staines (John Challis) develops into her most sustained romantic storyline, evolving from initial distrust to eventual marriage. Monty is introduced as a conman, and their relationship is characterised by instability, deception and his repeated professional failures, forming a recurring narrative across the later series. The storyline culminates in their wedding in the tenth series, which was widely trailed as a major plot event. Reporting on the episode, Digital Spy described "a huge bash to celebrate the nuptials of Joyce Temple-Savage … and Monty Staines", noting that "everything went off track… making Joyce's dream wedding into a waking nightmare," reflecting the programme's blend of sentiment and farce.

== In other media ==
Hewson reprised her role of Joyce in Benidorm Live, a major theatre adaption of the programme. Beginning in September 2018, over 200 shows were scheduled to take place in various locations throughout the United Kingdom and Ireland. Speaking about making the move from television to stage, Hewson stated: "It had been talked about for 18 months and there was chat about it while we were filming the 10th series, but then it seemed to be confirmed quite suddenly. We're so thrilled, because we're following in the footsteps of all those wonderful sitcoms that went to the stage and it will be great to hear the confirmation from the audience of what we do."

== Reception ==
Hewson's portrayal was frequently highlighted as a strong comedic element in the programme's later years. Reviewing the stage adaptation Benidorm Live, Diane Davies of the Express & Star noted that Joyce "does have a bit of pantomime about her", reflecting the heightened, theatrical style that critics often associated with the character. This emphasis on exaggerated mannerisms and authority was commonly identified as central to the humour of the later series, with Joyce acting as a foil to the chaotic environment of the Solana resort.

More broadly, critics observed that Benidorm's evolving ensemble, of which Joyce became a key part, helped sustain the show after earlier cast departures. Commentary on the series has noted its "ability to maintain audience engagement with cast changes", even as reviews remained divided over the tone and direction of later episodes. Within this context, Joyce was often seen as emblematic of the show's shift toward broader, more exaggerated character comedy.

However, the character was also associated with some of the programme's more controversial humour. In 2017, an episode featuring Joyce prompted 118 complaints to Ofcom over a joke described as "highly offensive", while the Cleft Lip and Palate Association said it was "extremely disappointed" by the remark. The incident was cited by commentators as an example of the risks inherent in the show's reliance on provocative or politically incorrect humour.

== See also ==
- List of Benidorm characters
