= Benidorm series 4 =

Fourth season of television series

Benidorm
- Season 4
- Starring: Jake Canuso; Kathryn Drysdale; Janine Duvitski; Siobhan Finneran; Adam Gillen; Tim Healy; Kenny Ireland; Elsie Kelly; Shelley Longworth; Tony Maudsley; Steve Pemberton; Sheila Reid; Hugh Sachs; Selina Griffiths; Crissy Rock; Oliver Stokes
- No. of episodes: 6

Release
- Original network: ITV
- Original release: 26 December 2010 – 8 April 2011

Series chronology
- ← Previous; Series 3 Next → Series 5

The fourth season of the ITV television series Benidorm, which is a sitcom set in an all-inclusive holiday resort (The Solana), began broadcasting on 25 February 2011, consisting of six episodes. It was preceded by a Christmas special which aired on 26 December 2010. The entire series was directed by Sandy Johnson and written by Derren Litten. Multiple changes occurred within the cast this series, which saw the introductions of Shelley Longworth as Sam Wood, Tony Maudsley as Kenneth Du Beke, Kathryn Drysdale as Natalie Jones, Adam Gillen as Liam Conroy and Selina Griffiths as Pauline Mahmood. Furthermore, Tim Healy re-joined the cast, now on a permanent basis, whereas Cilla Black, Denise Welch, Bananarama, and Melvyn Hayes made brief guest appearances. Returning from the third series were the Garvey family, consisting of Mick (Steve Pemberton), Janice (Siobhan Finneran), Michael (Oliver Stokes) and Janice's mother Madge Barron (Sheila Reid); swingers Donald (Kenny Ireland) and Jacqueline Stewart (Janine Duvitski); Noreen Maltby (Elsie Kelly); homosexual couple Gavin (Hugh Sachs) and Troy Ramsbottom (Paul Bazely), though Bazely only appeared in the series finale; and Solana staff Mateo Castellanos (Jake Canuso) and manageress Janey York (Crissy Rock).

Overall, the series received an average viewership of 7.77 million, the highest in the programme's history, with the opening episode being watched by 8.61 million. The series concluded on 8 April 2011, with the series finale attracting 7.82 million viewers. The fourth series was initially supposed to be the final series to air, as Litten wanted to conclude writing new material, though high ratings and critical demand resulted in a fifth series being produced, airing in 2012.

== Cast ==
=== Main ===
- Steve Pemberton as Mick Garvey
- Siobhan Finneran as Janice Garvey
- Sheila Reid as Madge Harvey
- Oliver Stokes as Michael Garvey
- Kenny Ireland as Donald Stewart
- Janine Duvitski as Jacqueline Stewart
- Elsie Kelly as Noreen Maltby (episodes 2–6)
- Hugh Sachs as Gavin Ramsbottom
- Jake Canuso as Mateo Castellanos
- Crissy Rock as Janey Yorke
- Tim Healy as Les/Lesley Conroy
- Adam Gillen as Liam Conroy
- Shelley Longworth as Sam Wood
- Tony Maudsley as Kenneth De Beke
- Kathryn Drysdale as Natalie Jones
- Selina Griffiths as Pauline Mahmood (episodes 2–6)

=== Recurring ===
- Neil Fitzmaurice as Lucky Kev
- Shaun Foster-Conley as himself

=== Guest ===
- Cilla Black as herself
- Denise Welch as Scary Mary
- Bananarama as themselves
- Michael Fenton Stevens as Sir Henry
- Paul Bazely as Troy Ramsbottom

== Episodes ==
No. overall	Episode	Directed by	Written by	Original release date	UK viewers (millions)
Special
22	"Christmas Special"	John Henderson	Derren Litten	26 December 2010	7.41 (Note: 6.78 million on ITV, 628,000 on ITV HD)
The Garveys arrive at Benidorm to spend Christmas with Madge at her luxurious villa, bringing Sammy without his family, whilst Les/Lesley has been hired by Madge to track down the special guest for the Benidorm Palace's Christmas show, Su Pollard. Meanwhile, Noreen has returned to stay at the Solana but this time with a gentleman called Clive, who claims he was an old friend of Noreen's late husband, and Donald and Jacqueline have brought all members of the Middlesbrough Swingers Association to stay with them at the Solana. Mel lies to the Garveys that he was working in Morocco, but it turns out he was in hospital in a critical condition. Whilst at the Benidorm Palace Christmas Show, the Garveys receive a heartbreaking phone call when the nurse who spoke to Mick confirms that Mel is dead.
Series
23	"Episode 1"	Sandy Johnson	Derren Litten	25 February 2011	8.61 (Note: 7.51 million on ITV, 709,000 on ITV HD, 390,000 on ITV +1)
The Garveys are back in Benidorm to discover that Madge has mysteriously disappeared with her villa sold to Cilla Black and the Benidorm Palace also sold off. Meanwhile, Les/Leslie has got a new job as a barman at the Solana, much to Mateo's disapproval. Liam (Les's son) has a crush on new holidaymaker Natalie, who is accompanied by her close friend Sam. Kenneth, an employee at Troy & Gavin's salon, has joined Gavin, taking Troy's place whilst he is back in the UK tending to his critically ill long-lost father.
24	"Episode 2"	Sandy Johnson	Derren Litten	4 March 2011	8.11 (Note: 6.92 million on ITV, 779,000 on ITV HD, 410,000 on ITV +1)
Regular holidaymaker Noreen returns, instead with her daughter Pauline, who has just gone through a divorce with her Saudi Arabian husband Bashir. Later, they join the Garveys to a trip to the aqua park, but Mick has a strange encounter with Pauline. Meanwhile, Madge goes for a new makeover, whilst Natalie, Sam and Liam go out to a club.
25	"Episode 3"	Sandy Johnson	Derren Litten	11 March 2011	7.43 (Note: 6.37 million on ITV, 685,000 on ITV HD, 370,000 on ITV +1)
Mel's €6,000 debt has been bought by Mr Pink's mafia, which leads to a showdown between him and Madge at the go-kart racetrack. Back at the Solana, Donald is taken to hospital during Mateo's "water areobics session" after falling ill in the pool, which puts Mateo's job under threat. On the following night, to the Garveys shock, Mr Pink gives Madge €3000 after winning the go-kart race.
26	"Episode 4"	Sandy Johnson	Derren Litten	25 March 2011	7.41 (Note: 6.41 million on ITV, 577,000 on ITV HD, 420,000 on ITV +1)
A freak thunderstorm hits Benidorm, leaving most of the apartments in the Solana flooded and wrecked. Meanwhile, emotions run high for Janice when Johnny Neptune, an old flame, appears at the Solana. Gavin and Kenneth are in for a shock from Donald and Jacqueline, whilst Michael is in love.
27	"Episode 5"	Sandy Johnson	Derren Litten	1 April 2011	7.24 (Note: 6.16 million on ITV, 665,000 on ITV HD, 410,000 on ITV +1)
It's "80s night" at the Solana, featuring a performance from Bananarama. Madge is tipped about a pub in Benidorm that needs buying. Meanwhile, Les/Leslie asks Mateo a big favour, which could possibly ruin his reputation. Gavin & Kenneth go on an outing to a museum, but does their little trip to the cove beach nearby go quite as planned? Back at the Solana, the bar staff are refusing to serve Pauline alcoholic drinks, and it is the conclusion of Liam's quest to woo Natalie.
28	"Episode 6"	Sandy Johnson	Derren Litten	8 April 2011	7.82 (Note: 6.83 million on ITV, 690,000 on ITV HD, 302,000 on ITV +1)
Madge's deal of buying the pub she was tipped about is complete, with the possibility of the Garveys staying in Benidorm permanently. Meanwhile, Jacqueline receives some devastating news, and Natalie is in for a shock when the truth about Mateo's private life is revealed.

== Production ==
In 2010, it was announced that Benidorm would return for a Christmas special later that year before returning for a fourth series in 2011. After cast member Geoffrey Hutchings' sudden death in July 2010 from a suspected viral infection, the Christmas special was heavily rewritten to write his character out. It aired on 26 December 2010 with an audience of 7.41 million.

In April 2010, it was announced that Johnny Vegas had been axed ahead of the fourth series in order to pave the way for a new group of characters to be introduced. Later that month, Hannah Hobley confirmed that she would not reprise her role of Chantelle Garvey following Vegas' departure, commenting, "The decision was made some time ago that the story between my character 'Telle and The Oracle, played by my co-star and friend Johnny Vegas, had reached a natural conclusion, as the two unlikely lovers walked off hand in hand to the strains of Spanish Eyes at the end of series three." Abigail Cruttenden and Nicholas Burns were similarly written out of the show. Due to his filming schedule for Pirates of the Caribbean: On Stranger Tides, Paul Bazely was unable to commit to the fourth series, though did make a brief appearance in the series' final episode.

Adam Gillen joined the cast in the fourth series as Liam Conroy, the son of Les Conroy. Shelley Longworth and Kathryn Drysdale were introduced as friends Sam Wood and Natalie Jones, respectively. Longworth had been amongst several actresses who had auditioned for the role and discovered she had gained the part whilst attending a music festival; she travelled to Spain within a week to begin filming. Drysdale left her role in the BBC sitcom Two Pints of Lager and a Packet of Crisps in order to appear in Benidorm. To fill the void of Bazely's absence, Tony Maudsley was cast as Kenneth Du Beke, a hairdresser taking Troy's place on holiday with Gavin. Having previously auditioned for the role of Mick Garvey in 2006, Maudlsey described Kenneth as "a larger-than-life, colourful character. He has bagged himself a free holiday and is determined to make the most of it. He loves the free cocktails and buffet. Kenneth just wants to have a good time, much to the annoyance of Gavin. He gets involved in a lot of the big comedy storylines." Additionally, Selina Griffiths made her debut in the fourth series as Pauline Maltby, a recovering alcoholic who is the daughter of Noreen, on holiday with her in the place of Geoff. Singer Cilla Black and pop group Bananarama made notable guest appearances during the fourth series.

== Reception ==
=== Ratings ===
Episode	Running time (exc. adverts)	Original air date (United Kingdom)	ITV SD ratings (millions)	ITV HD ratings (millions)	ITV +1 ratings (millions)	Weekly rank	Rating increase / decrease
1	46 minutes	25 February 2011	7.51	0.71	0.39	12	N/A
2	46 minutes	4 March 2011	6.92	0.78	0.41	15	Decrease
3	46 minutes	11 March 2011	6.37	0.69	0.37	15	Decrease
4	46 minutes	18 March 2011	6.41	0.58	0.42	N/A	Decrease
5	46 minutes	25 March 2011	6.16	0.67	0.41	13	Decrease
6	46 minutes	1 April 2011	6.83	0.69	0.30	13	Increase
Series average		2011	6.70	0.69	0.77	—	

=== Critical response ===
Throughout the series' run, the show commanded an average of 7.77 million viewers – a sharp 1.25 million increase from the previous season. Critically, the first episode broke the still-standing ratings record for the show.

Similarly, at the time of broadcast, Metro reported the interest of holidays to Benidorm increase 159% upon the show's airing.

The fourth series was nominated for Best Situation Comedy at the 17th National Television Awards, eventually losing out to Outnumbered. Similarly, the show was also nominated for a TV Quick Award.

== Home media ==
The DVD of the fourth series was released on 14 November 2011.

The fourth series first became available for streaming through Netflix in the United Kingdom on 1 October 2015.
