= Benidorm series 10 =

Benidorm
- Series 10
- Starring: Jake Canuso; Janine Duvitski; Tim Healy; Tony Maudsley; Shelley Longworth; Sherrie Hewson; John Challis; Bobby Knutt; Steve Edge; Julie Graham; Kate Fitzgerald; Josh Bolt; Nathan Bryon; Julian Moore-Cook; Laila Zaidi; Adam Gillen; Elsie Kelly; Selina Griffiths
- No. of episodes: 9

Release
- Original network: ITV
- Original release: 28 February – 2 May 2018

Series chronology
- ← Previous; Series 9

The tenth series of the ITV television series Benidorm, which is a sitcom set in an all-inclusive holiday resort (The Solana) in Benidorm, Spain, began broadcasting on 28 February 2018, consisting of nine episodes. The series was written by Derren Litten and Mark Brotherhood whereas it was directed by David Sant, Duncan Foster and Litten, the latter of whom made his directorial debut. Returning from the ninth series included Solana staff Mateo Castellanos (Jake Canuso), Les/Lesley Conroy (Tim Healy), Joyce Temple-Savage (Sherrie Hewson) and Monty Staines (John Challis), hairdressers Kenneth Du Beke (Tony Maudsley) and Liam Conroy (Adam Gillen) and holiday rep Sam Wood (Shelley Longworth). Holidaymakers included the Dawson family, consisting of married couple Billy (Steve Edge) and Sheron (Julie Graham), son Rob (Josh Bolt), Billy's father Eddie (Bobby Knutt) and Sheron's mother Loretta Chase (Kate Fitzgerald), Joey Ellis (Nathan Bryon), Jacqueline Stewart (Janine Duvitski) and the Maltby family, consisting of Noreen (Elsie Kelly) and Pauline (Selina Griffiths). New additions to the cast included Cyd (Laila Zaidi) and Callum (Julian Moore-Cook).

== Cast ==
=== Main ===
- Jake Canuso as Mateo Castellanos
- Janine Duvitski as Jacqueline Stewart
- Tim Healy as Les/Lesley Conroy
- Tony Maudsley as Kenneth Du Beke
- Shelley Longworth as Sam Wood
- Sherrie Hewson as Joyce Temple-Savage
- John Challis as Monty Staines
- Bobby Knutt as Eddie Dawson
- Steve Edge as Billy Dawson
- Julie Graham as Sheron Dawson
- Kate Fitzgerald as Loretta Chase
- Josh Bolt as Rob Dawson
- Nathan Bryon as Joey Ellis
- Julian Moore-Cook as Callum
- Laila Zaidi as Cyd
- Adam Gillen as Liam Conroy
- Elsie Kelly as Noreen Maltby
- Selina Griffiths as Pauline Maltby

=== Recurring ===
- Nigel Havers as Stanley Keen
- Michael Fenton Stevens as Sir Henry
- Paul Chan as Mr Wu
- Shane Richie as Sammy Valentino
- Antonio de la Cruz as Vladimir
- Norman Pace as Nigel
- Gareth Hale as Dennis
- Gary Oliver as Franco

=== Guest ===
- David O'Reilly as Bean
- Mark Heap as Malcolm Barrett

== Episodes ==
No. overall	Episode	Directed by	Written by	Original release date	UK viewers (millions)
66	"Episode 1"	David Sant	Derren Litten	28 February 2018	5.77
It's the day of Monty and Joyce's wedding, but almost from the very beginning, their happiest day seems riddled with everything going wrong in melodramatic style involving Mr Wu's banquet, Sir Henry as the very unwelcome substitute priest, seasickness and an outrageously offensive best man speech from Mateo. As the wedding is in turmoil, Kenneth steps up to the plate and risks his life to save everyone. Elsewhere, Sheron and Billy return to the Solana to enjoy their Silver Wedding anniversary, but fear that bickering Loretta and Eddie, who have for some reason also joined them for the celebrations, will not approve of Rob and his new pal Cyd when they get there. Stanley Keen returns to Blow 'n' Go, planning to set up a dentist's practice, but has to deal with the majority shareholder, Jacqueline. Could some blindsiding ridiculously white teeth persuade the widowed swinger? Plus, acting managaress Sam is roped into Dodgy Dave's rigged raffle scam that does not go according to plan at all because of Dave's many crimson coloured children!
67	"Episode 2"	David Sant	Derren Litten	7 March 2018	5.89
With Eddie and Loretta awaiting their grandson's arrival, Sheron and Billy learn the terrifying truth when Rob and Cyd finally check in to the Solana. The wedding party are also back at the Solana, but Kenneth is noticeably absent from the crowd having become lost at sea. But there are happy endings all round when Kenneth emerges from the waves with a thrilling tale to tell. However, what will he think of Stanley and all his dental instruments of torture in Blow 'n' Go? Elsewhere, dim-witted regular Joey checks in, but instead of going with Tiger, he has come with his new Irish friend Callum.
68	"Episode 3"	David Sant	Derren Litten	14 March 2018	5.15
Monty has been appointed as the hotel's entertainments manager by Joyce and throws himself into work by planning a 'magical' evening that the guests will not forget any time soon, but is that for the right reasons? Meanwhile, it is looking like a day of romance for Kenneth and Callum, while the Dawson family hold their suspicions over Cyd. Also, Liam is back at the Solana and reunites with his most loved ones.
69	"Episode 4"	David Sant	Mark Brotherhood	21 March 2018	5.60
When things go very downhill for Monty as he faces the furious wrath of Joyce and his job is put on the line, there is a glimmer of hope. Could the surprise return of entertainer Sammy Valentino be the key to getting Monty's job back? Meanwhile, Jacqueline's newest business venture certainly fails to impress Liam and Kenneth and there are two very suspicious men sneaking around the Solana. Elsewhere, Eddie adds to the Dawson's family troubles and Callum is seeking a professional.
70	"Episode 5"	David Sant	Mark Brotherhood	4 April 2018	5.30
As Noreen and Pauline return to the Solana, Pauline's writer's block disappears on finding her muse, as well as alcohol, and proceeds on writing an erotic novel that disgusts Noreen but intrigues Jacqueline. Monty is worried about Sammy, but how can he lose 'the fear' and how can he get Joyce to keep him employed? Kenneth's ongoing romantic troubles with the persistent Vladimir means he needs a wife, in order to get Vladimir to go away. Will Sam oblige? Cyd's dad flies in to meet the Dawson clan, but he has a bombshell in store. Lesley's paranoia grows over Dennis and Nigel, who must go to great measures to take advantage of their free week in the Spanish sun.
71	"Episode 6"	Duncan Foster	Mark Brotherhood	11 April 2018	4.96
Noreen senses that her more glamorous identical twin Doreen is about, while Sammy is still giddy from his comeback performance and decides to make his Neptunes debut, but there is a twist coming as his shockingly strange past catches up with him, involving a ventriloquist's dummy and an obsessive fan. Elsewhere, Rob races against time to get his beautiful Cyd back from her father, prompted by Mateo's terrible wisdom – however, Billy and Eddie cannot help but get involved, because of a suggestion Eddie makes regarding Breaking Bad.
72	"Episode 7"	Duncan Foster	Mark Brotherhood	18 April 2018	4.54
After Sammy performs some disastrous acts in Neptunes, a furious Joyce wants him out. What will she think when Monty gives Sammy a contract? Meanwhile, Doreen decides to send Pauline's novel off to the publishers and Dennis and Nigel find themselves growing reluctant to arrest Lesley. With Rob and Cyd off in Paris, Billy and Sheron relive their youth together and Mateo may be facing an unwelcome trip. Elsewhere, Doreen introduces Noreen and Pauline to her boyfriend – who is revealed to be Malcolm, who has a very sinister plan in store.
73	"Episode 8"	Derren Litten	Derren Litten	25 April 2018	4.50
Monty is in need of a new job after being sacked by Joyce, and has to decide whether to swallow his pride and go to Sir Henry, or see if Mr Wu has a fitting position for him. Meanwhile, Loretta and Eddie make secret plans for an anniversary party for Billy and Sheron back in the UK, but it looks as if the couple are making plans of their own. Elsewhere, things are not going well for Kenneth as he wakes up in Blow 'n' Go after a big night out, only to realise that the builders have inadvertently bricked him in.
74	"Episode 9"	Derren Litten	Derren Litten	2 May 2018	4.45
A strike in the airport by the baggage handlers causes panic at the Solana, and the Dawsons rush to catch their flight with Billy and Sheron's anniversary plans now in jeopardy as they may not make it back to the UK in time to attend a celebration party. Kenneth is on the warpath with Joyce after his accidental imprisonment the previous day, and Joyce worries about the rumours that Crystal Hennessy-Vass may be selling the Solana. Sam's old flame Angelo is in town, devastating Joey, and misunderstandings are finally resolved between Monty and Joyce.

== Production ==
Benidorm was renewed for a tenth series in March 2017 whilst the ninth series was being broadcast. Filming began later that month. In August 2017, ITV dismissed speculation that the show would be ending, citing that the tenth series had been confirmed shortly after the ninth series' premiere. An ITV spokesperson stated that future commissioning for additional series would be determined around the time that the tenth series came to airing.

Upon the programme being confirmed to return for its tenth series, it was confirmed that Johnny Vegas, Paul Bazely and Danny Walters would not reprise their respective roles of Geoff Maltby, Troy Ganatra and Tiger Dyke. Shane Richie, who had portrayed the role of Sammy Valentino during a guest stint in the eighth series, was announced to be reprising his role in the tenth series, establishing a supporting role in the cast. Laila Zaidi joined the cast in the role of Cyd, the new South American girlfriend of established character Rob Dawson, featuring in his exit storyline. Additionally, Julian Moore-Cook was also a newcomer for the tenth series, portraying the role of Callum, a new holiday companion for Joey, replacing Tiger.

This series also featured an array of guest stars including children's TV comedy duo The Chuckle Brothers, legendary comedian Bobby Ball and singers Holly Johnson, Carol Decker and Tony Hadley. Plus another comic duo, Hale and Pace starred as undercover detectives investigating Lesley as well as actors Claire Sweeney as Maxine a snooty holiday rep and Nigel Havers returning as conman dentist Stanley. Young comedy star Layton Williams also appeared in the series in episode 9. Another notable appearance is that of Mark Heap, returning as "Malcolm" the oddball mystery ex of Pauline and Kenneth.

== Home media ==
The three-disk DVD for the tenth series was released in the United Kingdom on 7 May 2018. It included a documentary, celebrating the tenth anniversary of the programme's first broadcast, entitled Benidorm: 10 Years on Holiday.

The tenth series first became available for streaming through Netflix in the United Kingdom on 13 January 2024.
