= It's Adam and Shelley =

- Genre: Comedy
- Created by: Adam Longworth; Shelley Longworth
- Directed by: Tim Kirkby
- Starring: Adam Longworth; Shelley Longworth
- No. of series: 1
- No. of episodes: 6

Production
- Running time: 30 minutes

Original release
- Network: BBC Three
- Release: 1 October – 5 November 2007

It's Adam and Shelley is a British television variety series written by brother and sister Adam and Shelley Longworth. The series was directed by Tim Kirkby and was broadcast on BBC Three from 1 October to 5 November 2007.

Following poor reception and ratings, the show was axed by BBC Three in December 2007.

== Episodes ==
It's Adam and Shelley was originally planned as a one-off pilot but was later picked up for a full six-part series earlier in 2007. The six episodes began airing on 1 October 2007 and finished on 5 November 2007.
