= Sport Relief 2012 =

UK television program

- Genre: Telethon
- Presented by: Gary Lineker; Claudia Winkleman; Dermot O'Leary; Davina McCall; David Walliams; Miranda Hart; James Corden; John Bishop; Patrick Kielty; Fearne Cotton
- Starring: Helen Skelton; David Walliams; John Bishop; Freddie Flintoff; Frank Skinner
- Voices of: Alan Dedicoat
- Country of origin: United Kingdom

Production
- Executive producer: Richard Curtis
- Production location: BBC Television Centre
- Camera setup: Multiple
- Running time: Various

Original release
- Network: BBC One, BBC Two
- Release: 23 March – 24 March 2012

Related
- Sport Relief 2010; Sport Relief 2014; Let's Dance for Sport Relief

Sport Relief 2012 was a fundraising event organised by Comic Relief. It was broadcast on BBC One and BBC Two on the evening of 23 March 2012 from 7:00 pm to 1:45 am, live from the BBC Television Centre. It raised £50,447,197, the most ever raised by a Comic Relief event.

== Before/after the live event ==
In the autumn of 2011, David Walliams swam 140 miles (230 km) of the River Thames in eight days. During the eight days Walliams suffered from illness and flu. Walliams took time to recover after the event due to the intake of Thames water that contained bacteria and sewage. He swam a total distance in eight days, a total of 111,352 strokes were swam and 68,186 calories were burnt. So far he has raised £1,194,258 for Sport Relief.

Fearless Blue Peter presenter Helen Skelton made it to the South Pole in just 18 days by ski, bike and kite, bringing her epic, 500 miles (800 km) Antarctic expedition to a triumphant close. For this gruelling challenge, she travelled up to 14 hours a day across the coldest and windiest place on earth, battling blizzards and sub-zero temperatures. It was shown for 9 weeks on Mondays on BBC1 at 4:30pm and an adult version was shown on the Fridays on BBC1 at 8:30pm before the main event.

On 27 February 2012, comedian John Bishop took on a week of challenges billed as "John Bishop's Week of Hell". Originally John was to complete the challenge with James Corden but he had to pull out due to his commitments with the West End Show One Man, Two Guvnors. John rowed, ran and cycled 295 miles from Paris to London in just five days. John raised £3,412,261. His programme was shown the day before Sport Relief night at 9:00pm on BBC1.

"The One Show 1000" ran from 16 to 25 March, 1,000 One Show viewers ran a mammoth 1,000-mile, ten-day relay through cities across Scotland, Northern Ireland, Wales and England. Starting on the Isle of Mull, our brave team ran night and day to finish triumphantly on The Mall in London.

"The Frank Skinner Dipping Challenge" was on Sport Relief day, brave Frank is threw himself in at the deep end for Sport Relief and facing one of his biggest phobias – swimming. He did a length, 25 metres, in front of 3,000,000 people on the Sport Relief show.

On Saturday 10 March, celebrity teams from England, Ireland, Scotland and Wales set off head-to-head in the "DHL First Nation Home" challenge. Over seven days, the teams covered a gruelling distance of more than 1,000 miles around the four nations. On Sunday 25 March, the public joined them and team England won, the celebrities were Jason Isaacs, Timothy Peake, Caroline Quentin, Evanna Lynch, Brendan O'Carroll and Alan Sugar along with 5 other celebrities. The challenge was judged by Richard Hammond and Anita Rani, and was narrated by Alexander Armstrong.

£7.9 million was raised via SMS text donations, more than double the amount of donations received in 2010.

== Presenters ==
Time	Presenters
19:00–20:40	Gary Lineker and Claudia Winkleman
20:40–22:00	Dermot O'Leary and Davina McCall
22:00–22:40 (BBC Two)	David Walliams and Miranda Hart
22:40–00:25	James Corden and John Bishop
00:25–01:45	Patrick Kielty and Fearne Cotton

== Donation process ==
Time	Amount
20:37	£15,427,038
21:55	£29,143,340
00:21	£45,903,150
01:41	£50,447,197

- The total raised on the night of broadcast was over £50,000,000. The four main celebrity Sport Relief challenges raised over £6,000,000.

=== Large donations ===
- Walliams vs TheThames – £2,501,240
- Bishop's Week of Hell – £3,412,261
- Flintoff's Record Breakers – £260,394
- Helen Skelton's Polar Challenge – £150,000+
- Sainsbury's – £4,031,108.28 (so far)
- British Airways – £1,800,787

== Sketches ==
Title	Brief Description	Starring
Outnumbered	Karen is Frank Lampard's mascot, and begins to discuss with him his skills and how he could improve at football. Meanwhile, Jake receives numerous autographs he plans to sell for his economics coursework, ending up donating the proceeds to charity.	Claire Skinner, Hugh Dennis, Tyger Drew-Honey, Daniel Roche, Ramona Marquez, Howard Webb, Christine Bleakley and Frank Lampard
Strictly Come Dancing Underwater	The finalists from 2011 battle for one final time but this time underwater.	Claudia Winkleman, Len Goodman, Craig Revel Horwood, Mark Foster, Bruno Tonioli, Chelsee Healey, Harry Judd, Aliona Vilani and Pasha Kovalev
Horrible Histories	Stephen Fry and the Cast of Horrible Histories take some sporting stars back to the classroom.	Stephen Fry, Jermain Defoe and Amir Khan
Frank Skinner's Big Swim	Frank Skinner faces his fears and swims a length of a swimming pool, live.	Frank Skinner
Miranda	Miranda finds herself facing off against one of the greatest Tennis stars in the world at the Royal Albert Hall. Meanwhile, Miranda, Penny, and Stevie are acting weird – in the VIP area.	Miranda Hart, Patricia Hodge, Sarah Hadland, Robbie Savage, Tim Henman, Michael Owen, Sue Barker, Jayne Torvill, Roberto Mancini, Clare Balding, Goran Ivanišević and various others
Benidorm meets Britain's Got Talent	The cast of Benidorm form the worst Boy Band ever and audition for Simon Cowell and the judges.	Jake Canuso, Sheila Reid, Siobhan Finneran, Steve Pemberton, Oliver Stokes, Tony Maudsley, Adam Gillen, Simon Cowell, Alesha Dixon, Carmen Electra, David Walliams, Anthony McPartlin and Declan Donnelly.
Let's Dance for Sport Relief	A special dancing montage.	Rowland Rivron, Dani Harmer, Tyger Drew-Honey, Laurie Brett, Tameka Empson and other contestants of Let's Dance for Sport Relief.
Saturday Kitchen	James Martin hosts as the England Football Team battle it out in an Omelette challenge.	James Martin and four members of the England Football Team (Robert Green, Glen Johnson, Scott Parker and Theo Walcott).
QI	Stephen Fry hosts a special edition of the show.	Stephen Fry, Alan Davies, Jimmy Carr, Lee Mack and Sandi Toksvig
Twenty Twelve	Zara Phillips and Sir Steve Redgrave join the regular cast of the BBC 4 Sketch Show for a special Sketch.	Standard Cast, Zara Phillips, and Sir Steve Redgrave
Never Mind the Buzzcocks	Jake Humphrey hosts as there is a special edition of the show just for Sport Relief.	Jake Humphrey, Louise Redknapp, Melanie C, Austin Healey, Tim Lovejoy, Phill Jupitus and Noel Fielding.
Mock the Week	Special edition of the panelist show.	Dara Ó Briain, Andy Parsons, Hugh Dennis Ed Byrne, Stewart Francis, Adam Hills and Chris Addison.
Absolutely Fabulous	A special episode of the show starring some of the best UK sporting stars.	Jennifer Saunders, Joanna Lumley, Stella McCartney, Kate Moss, David Gandy, Emma Bunton, Linford Christie and Colin Jackson.
A Question of Sport	Some sporting greats join the regulars for a special edition of the show.	Sue Barker, Matt Dawson, Phil Tufnell, Steve Cram, Ricky Hatton, Adrian Moorhouse, Gail Emms and Richie Woodhall.
Freddie Flintoff Record Breaker	Cricketer Freddie Flintoff attempts to break twelve world records in twelve hours.	Freddie Flintoff
Celebrity Juice	A potted edition of the show.	Keith Lemon, Fearne Cotton, Holly Willoughby, Rufus Hound, Harry Judd, Dougie Poynter, Mark Foster, Freddie Flintoff and David Hasselhoff.
8 Out of 10 Cats	A potted edition of the show.	Jimmy Carr, Jon Richardson, Sean Lock, Rachel Riley, Russell Kane, Example & Mark Watson
Mo Farah and Misery Bear	Mo Farah and Misery Bear act out the famous fable of the Tortoise and the Hare.	Mo Farah, Lionel Richie and Misery Bear
The Rugby Choir	JLS and Zoe Tyler attempt to turn the England Rugby Team into a tuneful choir and ready to perform live on Sport Relief.	JLS, Zoe Tyler and The England Rugby Team.
Stand Up for Sport Relief	The comedy set of Gabby Logan, winner of the BBC Three programme Stand Up for Sport Relief	Gabby Logan, Patrick Kielty and Claudia Winkleman

== Musical performances ==
Artist	Song	Notes
JLS	"Proud"	The Official Sport Relief 2012 Song
Snow Patrol	"New York" and "Chasing Cars"	
Emeli Sandé	"Next to Me"	
LMFAO	"Party Rock Anthem" and "Sexy and I Know It"	featuring GoonRock and "The Party Rock Crew"
