= Hugh Sachs =

British actor, born 1964

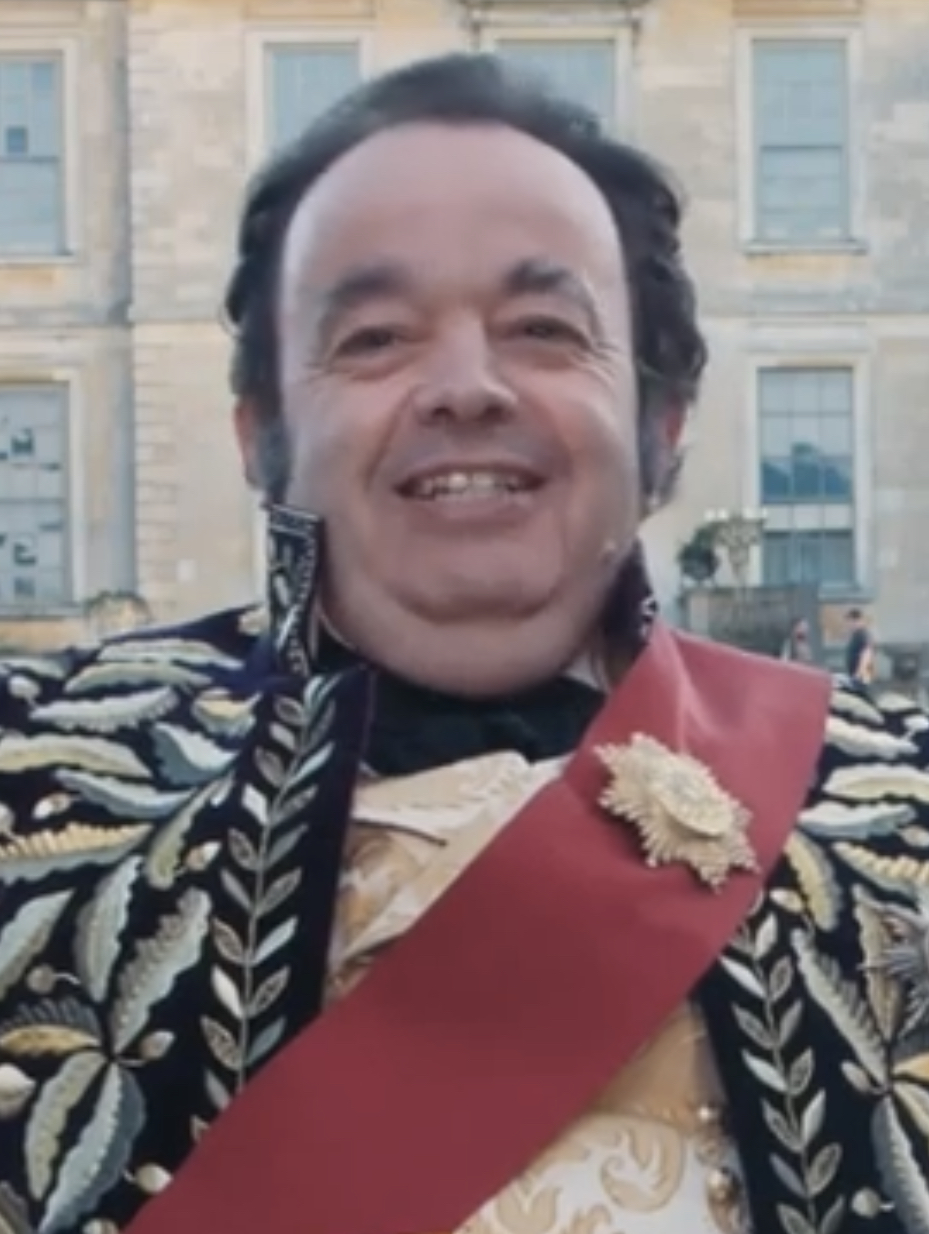
- Sachs behind the scenes of Queen Charlotte
- Born: Hugh J. Sachs; 25 February 1964 (age 62); Manchester, Lancashire, England
- Occupation: Actor
- Years active: 1992–present
- Known for: Benidorm (2007–2012); Bridgerton (2020–)
- Father: Michael Sachs
- Website: X.com

Hugh J. Sachs (born 25 February 1964) is an English actor. He is best known for his roles as Gavin Ramsbottom in the ITV hit sitcom Benidorm (2007–2012) and Brimsley in the Netflix period drama Bridgerton (2020–) and its prequel Queen Charlotte: A Bridgerton Story (2023).

== Career ==
Sachs has appeared in numerous television shows and films, including Aristocrats, Foyle's War, Midsomer Murders, The Catherine Tate Show, My Family and Footballers' Wives. His film credits include The Libertine, Like Minds, Love, Honour and Obey, and Mad Dogs and Englishmen. Sachs also appeared as Godfrey in Victoria Wood's 2006 production Housewife, 49.

In 2012 Sachs appeared in Secrets and Words, a BBC Learning show about adult literacy, and 2013, he appeared as Harry Dangle in the West End play One Man, Two Guvnors at the Theatre Royal, Haymarket in London opposite Rufus Hound.

Sachs is a board member of The Theatrical Guild.

== Credits ==
=== Television ===
Year	Title	Role	Notes
1993	Minder	Kenny	Episode: "No Way To Treat A Daley"
1993	Demob	Scott	2 episodes
1994	Pie in the Sky	Chef 1	Episode: "The Best of Both Worlds"
1996	Giving Tongue	Crank Heir	Television film
1999	Aristocrats	Charles James Fox	4 episodes
2001	Perfect Strangers	Desk Clerk	TV mini-series
2002	tlc	Mr. Grey	Episode: "Agency Nurse"
2002	Goodbye Mr Chips	Hotelier	Television film
2003	Casualty	Martin Harrington	Episode: "Keep It in the Family"
2003	The Forsyte Saga	Coombes	Series 2, Episode 2
2003	Silent Witness	Usher	Episode: "Fatal Error: Part 1"
2003	Prime Suspect 6: The Last Witness	Hotel Manager	TV mini-series; 2 episodes
2003	Wire in the Blood	Bishop's assistant	Episode: "The Darkness of Light"
2005	Murder Investigation Team	Dr. Charles Renfield	4 episodes
2005	The Inspector Lynley Mysteries	Steve	Episode: "The Seed of Cunning"
2005	Footballer's Wives	Dr. Rose	Series 4, Episode 1
2005	Riot at the Rite	Marcel	Television film
2005	Rome	Clerk	Episode: "Triumph"
2006	Foyle's War	Henry Styles	Episode: "Bad Blood"
2006	Him and Us	Sydney	Television film
2006	The Catherine Tate Show	Father	Episode: "1951-2006"
2006	Housewife, 49	Godfrey	Television film
2006	The Shell Seekers	Brookner	Season 1, Episode 2
2007	Midsomer Murders	Harold Bumstead	Episode: "King's Crystal"
2007	The Catherine Tate Show	Herbert	Episode: "2007 Christmas Special"
2007–2012	Benidorm	Gavin Ramsbottom	Series regular; 34 episodes
2008	City of Vice	Samuel Drybutter	Season 1, Episode 3
2008	Trexx and Flipside	Pittman	Episode: "B-Ice's New Clothes"
2010	My Family	Rupert	Episode: "He's Just Not That Into Ben"
2013	Family Tree	Rex Mottram	Episode: "Treading the Boards"
2015	The Interceptor	De Carlo	Series 1, Episode 1
2019	Endeavour	Reverend Postill	Episode: "Pylon"
2019	Holby City	'Galvo' Daniel Kenny	Episode: "Kiss Kiss"
2020	Father Brown	Lawrence Ashton	Episode: "The Celestial Choir"
2020–present	Bridgerton	Brimsley	Main cast; 7 episodes
2022	Andor	Senator Dhow	Season 1, Episode 8
2023	Queen Charlotte: A Bridgerton Story	Brimsley	Main cast; 6 episodes
2025	Amadeus	Von Strack	Supporting cast; 5 episodes

=== Film ===
Year	Title	Role	Notes
1995	Mad Dogs and Englishmen	Brooks	
2000	Love, Honour and Obey	Unnamed	
2004	Gladiatress	The Husband	Short film
2004	The Libertine	Ratcliffe	
2006	Like Minds	Rev Donaldson	
2009	Beyond The Fire	Father Brendan	
2010	The Nutcracker in 3D	Tinker	
2017	National Theatre Live: Amadeus	Count Franz Orsini-Rosenberg	
2018	Medusa's Ankles	The Husband	Short film
2018	Beauty	Sickle	Short film

== Awards and nominations ==
Year	Award	Category	Work	Result	Ref.
2021	Screen Actors Guild Awards	Outstanding Performance by an Ensemble in a Drama Series	Bridgerton	Nominated	
