= Sherrie Hewson =

English actress (born 1950)

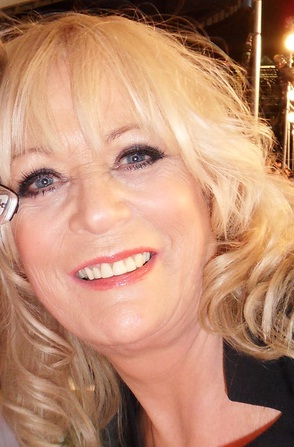
- Hewson in 2011
- Born: Sherrie Lynn Hutchinson; 17 September 1950 (age 76); Beeston, Nottinghamshire, England
- Education: Royal Academy of Dramatic Art
- Occupations: Actress; television personality; novelist
- Years active: 1971–present
- Spouses: Hector Blamey (m. 1972; div. 1974) Ken Boyd (m. 1983; div. 2011)
- Partner: Robert Lindsay (1970–1972)
- Children: 1
- Relatives: Garry Birtles (cousin)

Sherrie Hewson (born Sherrie Lynn Hutchinson; 17 September 1950) is an English actress, television personality and writer. She is known for her roles as Maureen Holdsworth in Coronation Street (1993–1997, 2006), Virginia Raven in Crossroads (2001–2003), Lesley Meredith in Emmerdale (2004–2006), Joyce Temple-Savage in Benidorm (2012–2018) and Martha Blake in Hollyoaks (2024–2025).

Hewson appeared as Doreen Nesbitt (1979-1980) and Mary Henshaw in In Loving Memory (1984–1986) and as Jean in Barbara (1999–2003) on television, and has starred in the films Carry On Behind (1975), The Slipper and the Rose (1976) and Hanover Street (1979). She was a panellist on the ITV talk show Loose Women (2003–2017) and came sixth place in the Channel 5 reality show Celebrity Big Brother (2015). Hewson has also written three books including a fiction book and a cookery book.

== Early life ==
Born in Beeston, near Nottingham, Hewson was brought up in a show-business family; her father Ronald was a singer and her mother Joy was a model. Hewson began attending the local dance and dramatics school at the age of three. She then attended Dorothy Grants High School for Girls in Beeston, although after the family had moved to a large manor house in Burton Joyce, Hewson completed her primary education at the village school.

Aged twelve, Hewson was enrolled at The Rodney School, a boarding school in nearby Kirklington. Already a member of the Burton Joyce Players, Hewson attended the Midland Academy, studying drama and poetry, before she was granted a scholarship to attend the Royal Academy of Dramatic Art where she attended from age 18. While studying at RADA, Hewson shared a flat with fellow students Sharon Maughan and Louise Jameson.

== Career ==
Hewson made her screen debut in two episodes of Z-Cars before appearing in The Moonstone and Within These Walls. In 1975, she joined the Carry On team for the film Carry On Behind and was subsequently cast in several episodes of the Carry On Laughing television series.

As well as further film roles in The Slipper and the Rose with Richard Chamberlain and Edith Evans and Hanover Street with Harrison Ford, Hewson became a regular fixture on television, most notably as part of a young cast of future stars in Love For Lydia. She also had a brief role in the 1979 Alan Bennett drama Afternoon Off as Iris, the ultimately unworthy object of the protagonist Lee's quest.

In the 1980s, as well as appearances in dramas such as Play for Today, The Sandbaggers, Minder, Juliet Bravo and The Gentle Touch, Hewson's talent for comedy saw her invited to join Russ Abbot's Madhouse series, where she remained an integral part of his team for over ten years, later appearing in The Russ Abbot Show. Other comedy appearances included roles in Home to Roost, Home James!, Never the Twain and Haggard, while she was also a foil for various comedians, including Stanley Baxter, Les Dawson, Little and Large, Cannon and Ball and Les Dennis. Her most famous role during this period was as Mary Henshaw in the sitcom In Loving Memory with Thora Hird and Christopher Beeny.

In 1993, Hewson was cast as Maureen Naylor in the British soap opera, Coronation Street, a dizzy, accident-prone supermarket assistant dominated by her mother. In 1996, Hewson was due to leave the show to film the first series of the BBC's Oh, Doctor Beeching!, reprising her role of May Skinner from the 1995 pilot. Although the part had been written with her in mind, Hewson agreed to sign a new contract at the request of the Coronation Street producers, who had storylines planned for her character, and Julia Deakin took over the role of May. However, in 1997, Coronation Street's new producer Brian Park axed a number of characters, including Maureen. Hewson's final episode was broadcast in October 1997. In December 2006, she returned as Maureen (now Webster) for two episodes.

Hewson returned to the theatre – appearing in Billy Liar and several pantomimes – and radio, notably as the lead character in a series entitled The Circle. She appeared on a number of light entertainment programmes such as Blankety Blank, Noel's House Party and Call My Bluff among others. In 1999, Hewson was cast as Jean in the sitcom Barbara.

In 2001, Hewson joined the cast of another soap opera, as receptionist Virginia Raven in the revival of Crossroads. In 2003, Hewson became a regular panellist on Loose Women, an ITV daytime programme. On 3 August 2016, Hewson announced her departure from the show, with her last episode aired on 5 September 2016. In 2004, Hewson appeared in a celebrity edition of makeover show 10 Years Younger and underwent cosmetic surgery to her face as well as a hair and fashion overhaul. In 2004, Hewson joined the cast of Emmerdale as Lesley Meredith, mother of fishmonger Simon. She departed the show in May 2006. In 2007, Hewson made a number of non-acting television appearances. As well as Loose Women, she appeared in Celebrity MasterChef, Dickinson's Real Deal and was runner-up in Soapstar Superchef, partnered with her former Emmerdale co-star Julia Mallam. Hewson also appeared on a celebrity special of Who Wants to Be a Millionaire?.

In 2012, Hewson joined the cast of the sitcom Benidorm. From its fifth series, she appeared as Joyce Temple-Savage, the manager of the Solana Hotel. On 18 January 2015, Hewson took part in celebrity talent show Get Your Act Together with plate spinner illusionist Andrew Van Buren. In August 2015, Hewson was a contestant in the sixteenth series of the Channel 5 television show Celebrity Big Brother. She reached the final on Day 29, and finished in sixth place. In February 2016, Hewson was cast as Mrs. Slocombe in a remake of the BBC's classic sitcom Are You Being Served?, taking over the part made famous by the late Mollie Sugden. Only the pilot of this revival was made. In 2018, she took part in ITV's 100 Years Younger in 21 Days.

In 2024, Hewson was cast in a regular role in Channel 4's Hollyoaks as Martha Blake, the estranged grandmother of established character Sienna Blake. In 2025 it was announced that Hewson would be leaving the show after one year.

=== Writing ===
In March 2008, Hewson won BBC reality show Murder Most Famous, winning the opportunity to write her own crime fiction novel, The Tannery, which was published on 5 March 2009 by Pan Macmillan as one of their 'quick reads', released annually as part of the World Book Day celebrations. In 2011, she released her autobiography entitled Sherrie: Behind The Laughter. On 13 February 2014, Hewson published a cookbook called Nana's Kitchen.

== Personal life ==
After studying at RADA, Hewson dated and then lived with fellow student Robert Lindsay. The pair became engaged to be married, however a few days before the wedding, Hewson discovered Lindsay was having an affair and called it off. Hewson also had one date with Steve McQueen; he urged Hewson to try some seafood which she did not like - after she vomited all over him, Hewson got a taxi home and never saw McQueen again.

In 1972, Hewson began a live-in relationship with John Rowlands, a banker, but he physically abused her. In her autobiography, Hewson detailed how Rowlands would "knock her from one side of the room to the other" while she "cowered in terror". Rowlands became increasingly possessive and jealous of Hewson to the extent that when they went out to a bar, Rowlands followed her into the ladies' toilets and started banging on the cubicle doors to get her out. Deciding to end the relationship as it was damaging her mental health, after Rowlands returned to their table, Hewson began making her way out of the bar when Rowlands came up behind her and hit her across the head with a cricket bat. The first blow knocked Hewson unconscious, yet Rowlands continued to hit her with it until members of the public came to her aid. Although the police were called, Rowlands avoided trouble claiming it was a domestic argument. Although Hewson tried to distance herself from Rowlands, he followed her around and gave her "menacing" phone calls for several years afterwards.

Hewson married the artist Hector Blamey; their marriage ended in divorce in 1974. In May 1983, Hewson married Ken Boyd, whom she had met in 1976, and had a daughter with him in 1984. The couple separated in 2001 after he admitted having an affair, and divorced in 2011.

In 2007, after over 30 years in showbusiness, Hewson declared bankruptcy. She described the experience as like having "a dreadful, contagious disease".

Hewson is a cousin of retired footballer Garry Birtles. Hewson's mother died in 2012.

== Filmography ==
=== Film ===
Year	Title	Role	Notes
1975	Carry On Behind	Carol	Supporting Role
1976	The Slipper and the Rose: The Story of Cinderella	Palatine	Supporting Role
1979	Hanover Street	Phyllis	Supporting Role

=== Television ===
Year	Title	Role	Notes
1971	Z-Cars	Tina Williams	Episodes: Grandstand Finish: Parts 1 & 2"
1971	BBC Play of the Month	Anna's servant	Episode: "Rasputin"
1972	The Moonstone	Charity Ablewhite	Series 1: Episode 1
1972	Thirty-Minute Theatre	Christine	Episode: "Ronnie's So Long at the Fair"
1973	Z Cars	Susan Rawlings	Episode: "Suspicion"
1975	Churchill's People	Girl	Episode: "King Alfred"
1975	Within These Walls	Lynn Hayes	Episode: "Protest"
1975	Carry On Laughing	Nurse Millie Teazel	Episode: "The Case of the Screaming Winkles"
1975	Carry On Laughing	Virginia	Episode: "And in My Lady's Chamber"
1975	Carry On Laughing	Irma Klein	Episode: "The Case of the Coughing Parrot"
1975	Carry On Laughing	Virginia	Episode: "Who Needs Kitchener?"
1977	Love for Lydia	Nancy Holland	11 episodes
1978	ITV Playhouse	Liz	Episode: "Forty Weeks"
1978	Z Cars	Thelma Roberts	Episode: "Quilley on the Spot"
1978	Play For Today	May	Episode: "Butterflies Don't Count"
1979	My Son, My Son	Nellie Moscrop	2 episodes
1979–1980	In Loving Memory	Doreen Nesbitt	2 episodes
1980	Play For Today	Kate	Episode: "Kate the Good Neighbour"
1980	The Sandbaggers	Betty Galthorpe	Episode: "Sometimes We Play Dirty Too"
1980	Flickers	Letty	4 episodes
1980	Minder	Olive	Episode: "The Old School Tie"
1980	Juliet Bravo	Rosemarina Coop	Episode: "Oscar"
1981	Honky Tonk Heroes	Priscilla	Episode: "It's Only Make Believe"
1981	BBC2 Playhouse	Marjorie Garfield	Episode: "The Kindness of Mrs. Radcliffe"
1981	Winston Churchill: The Wilderness Years	Mrs. Pearman	5 episodes
1982	The Gentle Touch	Steph	Episode: "Joker"
1982–1984	Russ Abbot's Saturday Madhouse	Various	16 episodes
1984	Dream Stuffing	Housing Officer	Series 1: Episode 3
1984–1986	In Loving Memory	Mary Henshaw	8 episodes
1984	Dramarama	Noreen	Episode: "Fowl Pest"
1985	Full House	Phyllis	Episode: "Baby Talk"
1986	All At Number 20	Mrs. Melchett	Episode: "All at No. 20"
1987	Never the Twain	Doreen Miller	Episode: "The Battle of Deveraux Dale"
1987–1988	Home James!	Paula	12 episodes
1987	Home to Roost	Cynthia	Episode: "Family Ties"
1987–1988	The Little and Large Show	Various	2 episodes
1988	And There's More	Various	Series 4: Episode 1
1988–1991	The Russ Abbot Show	Various	39 episodes
1991	Lovejoy	Lily Gruber	Episode: "Lily's Pearls"
1991	The Les Dennis Laughter Show	Various	2 episodes
1992	The Bill	Annie Mower	Episode: "Lip Service"
1992	Haggard	Henrietta Masham	Episode: "Beau Haggard"
1993–1997, 2006	Coronation Street	Maureen Webster	Regular role; 401 episodes
1995	Oh, Doctor Beeching!	May Skinner	Episode: "Pilot"
1999–2003	Barbara	Jean Nesbitt	Main role; 21 episodes
2001–2003	Crossroads	Virginia Raven	All 34 Episodes
2003–2016, 2017	Loose Women	Panellist, Guest Panellist	Series 4 - 20
2004	The Courtroom	Maureen Smith	Episode: "Twice Bitten"
2004–2006	Emmerdale	Lesley Meredith	Regular role; 108 episodes
2010	Sixes and Sevens	Maude	Short Film
2012–2018	Benidorm	Joyce Temple-Savage	Regular role; 44 episodes
2012; 2024	Pointless Celebrities	Herself; contestant	2 episodes
2013	For the Love of Ella	Lady Garson	One-off drama
2015	Celebrity Big Brother	Herself; contestant	Series 16 Housemate; 6th place
2016	Are You Being Served?	Mrs. Slocombe	One-off special
2019–2020	Jeremy Vine	Herself	Guest Panelist (2 Episodes)
2019	The Comedy Years	Herself	Contributor (3 Episodes)
2019	Coronation Street at Christmas	Herself	Contributor (TV Special)
2020	The Gays Days	Kit Bell	Supporting Role
2022–2023	Murder, They Hope	Patricia	Main Role (2 Episodes)
2022	The Weakest Link	Herself; contestant	Series 2; episode 4
2023	The Real Full Monty	Herself/Performer	2 Episodes
2024–2025	Hollyoaks	Martha Blake	Regular role
2024	Daddy Issues	Agnes	Episode: "Man Mess"
2024	Celebrity Yorkshire Auction House	Herself	Episode: "Les Dennis & Sherrie Hewson"

== Theatre credits ==
Year	Title	Role	Notes
1984	Stepping Out	Vera	Duke of York's Theatre, London
1988–1989	Cinderella	Fairy Godmother	Dominion Theatre, London
1986	Run for Your Wife	Mary Smith	Criterion Theatre, London
1997–1998	Mother Goose	Fairy Modesty	Chichester Festival Theatre
1998	Billy Liar	Alice Fisher	King's Head Theatre, London
2000–2001	Snow White and the Seven Dwarfs	Queen	Mayflower Theatre, Southampton
2001–2002	Aladdin	Princess	Manchester Opera House
2004–2005	Snow White and the Seven Dwarfs	Queen	Derby Assembly Rooms
2006	Arsenic & Old Lace	Martha Brewster	UK tour
2006–2007	Sleeping Beauty	Fairy Godmother	Sheffield Lyceum
2008–2009	Cinderella	Fairy Godmother	Southport Theatre
2012–2013	Jack and the Beanstalk	Fairy	Grand Theatre, Wolverhampton
2013–2014	Dick Whittington	Fairy Bowbells	Theatre Royal Stratford East
2014–2015	Aladdin	Fairy Godmother	Hull New Theatre
2015–2016	Snow White and the Seven Dwarfs	Queen	De Montfort Hall, Leicester
2016–2017	Aladdin	Fairy Godmother	Manchester Opera House
2017–2018	Beauty and the Beast	Queen	Theatre Royal, Nottingham
2019–2020	Sleeping Beauty	Fairy Godmother	Venue Cymru, Llandudno
2021–2022	Fat Friends: The Musical	Julia Fleshman	UK tour
