= Shelley Longworth =

British actress (born 1976)

- Born: Shelley Nicola Longworth; 22 March 1976 (age 50); Barnby Dun, South Yorkshire, England
- Occupation: Actress
- Years active: 1995–present
- Children: 1

Shelley Nicola Longworth (born 22 March 1976) is an English actress. With a career spanning over two decades, she has appeared in various acting and voice roles, and has provided her voice for various children's television shows including Fimbles, Little Princess, Big Barn Farm, OOglies and Octonauts. She co-starred in a sketch series It's Adam and Shelley in 2007 and is known for playing the role of Sam Wood in Benidorm, from 2011 to 2012 and from 2017 to 2018.

== Career ==
In 2007, she paired up with her brother Adam Longworth, to create and perform characters in the BBC Three sketch show It's Adam and Shelley.

In 2010, she joined the cast of Benidorm for the fourth series playing loud-mouthed Sam Wood. She returned for the fifth series in 2012, alongside Michelle Butterly, and then departed from the show. In 2016, it was confirmed that Longworth would reprise her role as Sam for the ninth series, the first episode of which aired on 1 March 2017.

She has appeared in the comedy sketch shows Tittybangbang on BBC Three and Angelo's on Five, voiced characters in the children's show Fimbles, and starred in her own comedy series with her brother Adam Longworth, It's Adam and Shelley, which was broadcast on BBC Three in 2007. She played Ms Wall in Bad Girls in 1999, featuring in two episodes.

== Filmography ==
Year	Title	Role	Notes
1997	Gold	Marie	
1999	Bad Girls	Ms. Wall	
2001	The Bill	Anna Richie	
2002–2003	Fimbles	Florrie	Voice role
2004–2005	Lazy Lucy	Lucy	Main voice role; English dub
2005	BBC3 Blackout Comedy Lab	Herself	
2005–2006	Planet Grabo		English dub
2006–2010	Little Princess	Algie	Voice role
2006–2007	Tittybangbang	Various	
2006–2018	Cartoonito	Spike, Ting, Bubble	
2007	Angelo's	Maria	
2007	It's Adam and Shelley	Various	
2007	Ronni Ancona & Co	Various	
2007–2008	Freefonix	BB/Lady Lux	Voice role
2007–2008	Chop Socky Chooks	Chick P	Voice role
2008	Headcases	Various	
2008–2010	Big Barn Farm	Digger	Voice role
2009–2015	OOglies	Various	Voice role
2009–2010	Noddy in Toyland	Tessie Bear	Voice role
2010	Doctors	Tina Stubs	
2010	Burke & Hare	Hannah	
2010–2015	Octonauts	Various	Voice role
2010–2020	Compare the Meerkat	Bogdan	Voice role
2011–2012, 2017–2018	Benidorm	Sam Wood	Series regular, 31 episodes
2011	The Impressions Show with Culshaw and Stephenson	Various	
2011	Dick and Dom's Funny Business	Various	
2011	Trust Me, I'm a Genie	Zazie	
2011	Mount Pleasant	Burger Stand Worker	
2012	Bad Education	Female Dogger	
2012	The Increasingly Poor Decisions of Todd Margaret	Cath	
2013–2016	Challenge	Cecil the Geek	Voice role
2014	Vampire Academy	Feeder Norrine	
2015	Aaaaaaah!	Carolla	
2015–2019	Messy Goes to Okido	Felix	Voice role
2015–2020	Thunderbirds Are Go	Arctic Operator/GDF Crew	Voice role
2015–2016	Footy Pups	Rozzie	Voice role
2016	Brian Pern	Ripple Pern	
