= Kenny Ireland =

Scottish actor & director (1945–2014)

- Ireland in character as Donald Stewart from the comedy TV series Benidorm
- Born: George Ian Kenneth Ireland; 7 August 1945; Paisley, Renfrewshire, Scotland
- Died: 31 July 2014 (aged 68); London, England
- Occupations: Actor; theatre director
- Years active: 1965–2014

George Ian Kenneth Ireland (7 August 1945 – 31 July 2014) was a Scottish actor and theatre director. Ireland was best known to television viewers for his role in Victoria Wood: As Seen on TV in the 1980s, and for playing Donald Stewart in Benidorm from 2007 until his death in 2014.

== Early life and education ==
George Ian Kenneth Ireland was born on 7 August 1945 in Paisley, Renfrewshire, Scotland.

== Career ==
Ireland was prominent in Scottish theatre and spent ten years as director of the Royal Lyceum Theatre in Edinburgh. When he left the post in 2003 he criticised the Scottish arts establishment for providing "theatre on the cheap" and the Scottish Executive for putting plans for a National Theatre of Scotland on "the back burner". The National Theatre of Scotland was finally launched in 2006. He also appeared in an episode of Auf Wiedersehen, Pet as journalist Sid Payne. In some early TV appearances (e.g. the BBC's Five Red Herrings) he was credited as "Ian Ireland".

Ireland's directing credits include Guys & Dolls, A View from the Bridge, Romeo and Juliet, Phaedra, Macbeth, Lovers, The Anatomist, Clay Bull, Mother Courage, Much Ado About Nothing, Of Mice and Men, Private Lives, Oleanna, Sunset Song, The Silver Darlings, The Gowk Storm, Waiting for Godot, Dancing at Lughnasa, Oedipus Tyrannos and A Midsummer Night's Dream.

He also appeared in Acorn Antiques, the STV series Taggart, the 1983 film Local Hero, Dempsey and Makepeace episode "In the Dark", Series 2 of Auf Wiedersehen Pet, the 1990 series House of Cards as media tycoon Benjamin Landless starring alongside Ian Richardson as Francis Urquhart, and the David Leland film The Big Man with Liam Neeson. He was also in Heartbeat and made a brief appearance in the promo video for Tracey Ullman's "Sunglasses".

He appeared in the television series Benidorm as swinger Donald Stewart from 2007 until the end of series 6, that aired in early 2014. In June 2014, it was announced that he had brain cancer. His character did not appear in the seventh series of Benidorm in person but the character's voice was heard on a telephone call, with the voice over being provided by impressionist Alistair McGowan.

== Death ==
Ireland died of cancer on 31 July 2014, aged 68.

== Filmography ==
Film
Year	Title	Role	Notes
1972	The Hound of the Baskervilles	Sir Henry Baskerville	Television film
1980	Enemy at the Door	German officer Heller	1 episode
1980	The Dogs of War	Film crew member	Feature film
1982	Moonlighting	Timber man	Feature film
1983	Local Hero	Skipper	Feature film
1984	The Young Visiters	Alfred Salteena	Feature film
1985–1987	Victoria Wood: As Seen on TV	Derek	9 episodes
1986	Auf Wiedersehen, Pet	Sid Payne	1 episode
1987	Life Without George	Sammy	6 episodes
1987	City Lights	Bank Rober	
1987	A Hazard of Hearts	Padlett	Television film
1988	Salome's Last Dance	1st soldier	Feature film
1988	Drowning by Numbers	Jonah Bognor	Feature film
1989	Hard Cases	Slow Michael	
1989	Resurrected	Denzil Clausen	Feature film
1990	The Big Man	Tony	Feature film
1990	Drop the Dead Donkey	Sound man	
1990	Rab C. Nesbitt	Gavin Clark	
1990	House of Cards	Ben Landless	
1991	Spatz	Johnnie	
1991	4 Play	Sammy Duncan	
1992	El C.I.D.	Angus	
1993	Punch Drunk	Vinnie Binns	6 episodes
1997	Hamish Macbeth	Torquil McFarquar	
1999	Taggart	Kenny Murdoch	
1999	Loose Women	Himself	
2003	Monarch of the Glen	Mike Baxter	
2003	My Dad's the Prime Minister	Union leader	
2004	Heartbeat	Zeph Pratt	
2005	Casualty	Joshua Wright	
2005	New Tricks	George Morton	
2005	Rose and Maloney	Mr. Hawkins the prison officer	
2007–2014	Benidorm	Donald Stewart	Series regular, 42 episodes (Series 1–6)
2009	Beyond a Joke	Himself	
2011	All Star Family Fortunes	Himself	Benidorm vs. The Only Way is Essex
2012	This Morning	Himself	Interview
2012	Doctors	Godfrey Lang	
2012	Midsomer Murders	George Dormer	
