= Adam Gillen =

British actor (born 1985)

- Born: 11 September 1985 (age 41); Manchester, England
- Occupation: Actor
- Employers: ITV; BBC; Channel 4
- Television: Benidorm (2011–2018); Fresh Meat (2011); Prisoners' Wives (2012)
- Spouse: Laila Zaidi (m. 2026)

Adam Gillen (born 11 September 1985) is a British actor, best known for his role as Liam Conroy in the ITV hit series Benidorm, Brian in the Channel 4 comedy Fresh Meat and Gavin in BBC's Prisoners' Wives. In 2019, Gillen was nominated for an Olivier Award for Best Actor in a Supporting Role in Killer Joe.

== Early life ==
Gillen grew up in Gatley, Stockport. He studied acting at Stockport College, before going on to graduate from the Royal Academy of Dramatic Arts in 2007.

== Career ==
In 2000, Gillen was nominated for a TMA Award for Best Supporting Performance in a play for the Royal Exchange Theatre Company's A Taste of Honey. In 2011 he appeared as Moses in The School for Scandal.

Gillen is best known for his role as Liam in Benidorm from 2011 to its conclusion in 2018. Gillen's other television work includes The Gemma Factor, Oliver Twist, Just William and The Sarah Jane Adventures. In 2010, Gillen appeared in Noel Clarke's 4.3.2.1.. He appeared in Age of Heroes in 2011.

In 2014, Gillen appeared in Lotty's War (written by Giuliano Crispini and directed by Bruce Guthrie) at the Yvonne Arnaud Theatre, Guildford.

In October 2016, he appeared as Mozart in the National Theatre production of Peter Shaffer's Amadeus and reprised the role when the production returned from February to April 2018. A filmed performance from the Olivier Theatre was later used in 2020 as part of the National Theatre at Home online series.

In 2022, Gillen starred as the title role in William Shakespeare and John Fletcher's Henry VIII, performed at Shakespeare's Globe theatre, London. The production garnered mixed reviews from critics.

== Personal life ==
In 2023, Gillen became engaged to fellow Benidorm star Laila Zaidi; their relationship had been initially reported on in 2018. They married in 2026.

== Filmography ==
Year	Title	Role	Notes
2007	Oliver Twist	Noah Claypole	
2009	The Sarah Jane Adventures	Toby Silverman	Story: "The Eternity Trap"
2010	Last Call	Pullingswryth	Short
2010	4.3.2.1	Geek Brett	Supporting Role
2010	Just William	Hector	
2010	The Gemma Factor'	Lee	
2011	This Is Jinsy	Jinsy Player	Recurring role
2011	Fresh Meat	Brian	Recurring role
2011–2015, 2016–2018	Benidorm	Liam Conroy	Regular role, 44 episodes
2012	Prisoners' Wives	Gavin	
2012	Sport Relief 2012	Liam Conroy	Benidorm meets Britain's Got Talent
2012	We Are the Freaks	Splodger	Filming
2013	Way to Go	Neil	
2013	Love Matters	Clive	Episode: "Miss Wright"
2017–present	Game of Clones	Narrator	20 episodes
2018	Vita & Virginia	Duncan Grant	
2023	Boat Story	Vinnie Douglas	3 episodes
2026	Criminal Record	Kieran	6 episodes

== Theatre ==
Year	Title	Role	Stage	Notes
2007	The Five Wives of Maurice Pinder	Vincent	National Theatre (Cottesloe Stage)	
2008	The Lion's Mouth	Ben	Royal Court Theatre	
2008	The Good Soul of Szechuan	Wang the Waterseller	Young Vic	
2008	War and Peace	Alex	Royal Court Theatre	
2008	Proper Clever	Matthew	Liverpool Playhouse	
2008	A Taste of Honey	Geoffrey	Royal Exchange Manchester	
2009	For King and Country	Arthur Hamp	Plymouth Theatre Royal & national tour	
2010	The Door Never Closes	Collins	Almeida Theatre	
2011	The School for Scandal	Moses	Barbican Theatre	
2013	Lee Harvey Oswald	Lee	Finborough Theatre	
2015	Wendy and Peter Pan	Martin	Royal Shakespeare Company	
2016	Amadeus	Mozart	National Theatre (Olivier Stage)	
2018	Amadeus	Mozart	National Theatre (Olivier Stage)	
2018	Killer Joe	Chris	Trafalgar Studios	
2018–2019	Benidorm Live	Liam Conroy	UK Tour	250 shows
2021	Romeo and Juliet	Mercutio	Shakespeare's Globe	
2022	Henry VIII	Henry VIII	Shakespeare's Globe	
2024–2025	Cabaret	The Emcee	Playhouse Theatre	
2025–2026	Les Miserables	Thenardier	Sondheim Theatre	
2026	How the Other Half Loves	William Featherstone	The Old Vic	
