= Tony Maudsley =

English actor

- Born: 30 January 1968 (age 58); Kirkby, Lancashire, England
- Education: Royal Welsh College of Music & Drama, Ruffwood Comprehensive
- Years active: 1991–present
- Employers: ITV; BBC
- Known for: Coronation Street; Eyes Down; Benidorm; The Job Lot

Tony Maudsley (born 30 January 1968) is an English actor. He is best known for his portrayal of hairdresser Kenneth Du Beke in the ITV sitcom Benidorm, and George Shuttleworth in the ITV soap opera Coronation Street (2020–present).

His other credits include Martin in the BBC One sitcom Eyes Down (2003–2004) and Graham in the ITV2 sitcom The Job Lot (2013–2014).

Maudsley made his panto debut in 2016 as Dame Trott in Jack and the Beanstalk, at the Theatre Royal, Nottingham. He returned to pantomime the year after, playing a completely different part – the Genie of the Lamp, in Aladdin, at the Swansea Grand Theatre. In 2019 he made another panto appearance as Kenneth the Cabin Boy in Peter Pan at the Liverpool Empire.

== Career ==
His film career started when he landed a role in, A Life for a Life, in 1998 where he played the part of Stefan Kiszko. He also played many small parts on television in between acting in films.

He played the character of Joshua in the BBC Radio 4 situation comedy Revolting People and also appeared in series 3, episodes 5 & 6 of the ITV series Doc Martin as a postman. From 2011 until 2018, when the series was cancelled, Maudsley appeared in the ITV award-winning comedy Benidorm, playing hairdresser Kenneth Du Beke. He also appeared in series 18, episode 14 of the award-winning ITV police drama Heartbeat.

Tony Maudsley appeared in two episodes of Sky Living's series The Spa as Stephen/Stephanie. He also appeared in ITV's Northern Lights as the character "Doddy", in 2006.

In 2016 he performed the role of Edna Turnblad in the touring season of Hairspray. In late 2017 he featured as "Kenneth the Hairdresser/Part-time slave" in Swansea Grand Theatre's production of Aladdin.

== Filmography ==
=== Television ===
Year	Title	Role	Notes
1991–1992	Coronation Street	Rovers Drinker	Uncredited; 2 episodes
1995	Coronation Street	Bailey	Episode #1.3886
1995	The Biz	Roy	Unknown episodes
1997	Underworld	Gerald	Main role; 5 episodes
1998	A Life for a Life	Stefan Kiszko	Television film
2000	The Wilsons	Richard	All 6 episodes
2000	Queer as Folk	FaggotMan	2 episodes
2000	City Central	Arnie/Reggie	Episode: "Nutcase"
2000	Where the Heart Is	Mark Hall	Episode: "Legacy"
2001	Gentlemen's Relish	Job Agency Manager	Television film
2001	In a Land of Plenty	Simon Freeman	Main role; 6 episodes
2001	Peak Practice	Ian Fair	Episode: "Suffer the Little Children"
2001	Perfect Strangers	Peter	3 episodes
2001–2002	Nice Guy Eddie	O'Malley	4 episodes (Including pilot)
2001	Merseybeat	Simon Lascarides	Episode: "Crying Out Loud"
2001	My Beautiful Son	Frank	Television film
2001	Doc Martin	Billy May	Television film
2002	Rose and Maloney	David McVay	Episodes: "Pilot: Parts 1 & 2"
2002	Foyle's War	Bill Ferris	Episode: "A Lesson in Murder"
2002	Young Arthur	Aloysius	Television film
2003	My Uncle Silas	Pikey	Episode: "Shandy Lil"
2003, 2014	Holby City	Mike Handsley; Louis Herrara	2 episodes
2003	Murphy's Law	Danny	Episode: "Reunion"
2003	Ready When You Are Mr. McGill	Ted	Television film
2003–2004	Eyes Down	Martin	All 15 episodes
2004	The Last Detective	Billy Muldoon	Episode: "Christine"
2005	The Virgin Queen	Captain Morgan	Series 1: Episode 2
2005	The Ghost Squad	Brendan	Episode: "Firewall"
2006	Northern Lights	Doddy	2 episodes
2006	The Street	Frannie Doran	Episode: "The Flasher"
2006	Strictly Confidential	Dave	Series 1: Episode 4
2006	Masterpiece Mystery!	Mr. Berry	Episode: "The Sally Lockhart Mysteries: The Ruby in the Smoke"
2007	Lilies	Sergeant Dodd	Episode: "The White Charger"
2007	The Royal	Jimmy Beatie	4 episodes
2007	Wire in the Blood	Barry Davies	Episode: "The Colour of Amber"
2007	Doc Martin	Dave the Postman	2 episodes
2008	Waking the Dead	Terry Ryan	Episodes: "Sins: Parts 1 & 2"
2008	Inspector George Gently	Madsen	Episode: "The Burning Man"
2008	A Place of Execution	DS Tommy Clough	3 episodes
2009	Law & Order: UK	Mike Turner	Episode: "Care"
2009	Heartbeat	Lennie Phillips	Episode: "The Runaways"
2009	The Bill	Eamonn Fuller	Episode: "Unforgiven"
2009	Victoria Wood's Midlife Christmas	Postman	BBC Christmas Special
2009	The Day of the Triffids	Blind Police Officer	TV mini-series; 2 episodes
2010	Agatha Christie's Poirot	Supt Crossfield	Episode: "Three Act Tragedy"
2010	Mo	Peter Kilfoyle	Television film
2010	Garrow's Law	Robert Stubbs	Series 2: Episode 1
2011	Being Human	Graham (Obsidian)	Episode: "Type 4"
2011–2018	Benidorm	Kenneth Du Beke	Series regular; 52 episodes
2011	Monroe	Mr. Fraser	Series 1: Episode 6
2011	Emmerdale	Mr Lawson	5 episodes
2012	Sport Relief 2012	Kenneth Du Beke	Benidorm meets Britain's Got Talent
2012	Secrets and Words	JJ Roscoe	Episode: "Love Letters"
2013	Blandings	Cyril Wellbeloved	3 episodes
2013	The Spa	Stephen/Stephanie	2 episodes
2013–2014	The Job Lot	Graham	Main role; 12 episodes
2013	New Tricks	Simon Pennyman	Episode: "Cry Me a River"
2014	Edge of Heaven	Joe	Series 1: Episode 6
2015	Ordinary Lies	Ralf Kavanagh	Series 1: Episode 3
2017	The Royal Variety Performance 2017	Kenneth Du Beke	TV special
2019	Summer of Rockets	Spearman	3 episodes
2020	Dun Breedin'	Jean	Series 1: Episode 7; voice only
2020–present	Coronation Street	George Shuttleworth	Series regular

=== Film ===
Year	Film	Role	Notes
1999	Plunkett & Macleane	Older Clergyman	
1999	Sleepy Hollow	Van Ripper	
2000	The Nine Lives of Tomas Katz	Taxi driver	
2000	Honest	Chopper	
2000	Born Romantic	Turnkey	
2001	Redemption Road	Disco Doorman	
2002	Club Le Monde	Mosh	
2002	Revengers Trajedy	Executioner	
2002	The Intended	William Jones	
2003	Bright Young Things	Race Steward	
2004	Vanity Fair	Joseph Sedley	
2006	Irish Jam	Tony McNulty	shot largely in cornwall november 2004
2007	Harry Potter and the Order of the Phoenix	Grawp	Motion capture only
2009	The Scouting Book for Boys	Jim	
2010	Back to Nature	Neil	Short film
2010	Final Call	The Customer	Short film
2015	The Bad Education Movie	Yo Ho Ho Barman	
2022	The Naughty Boys	Dad	Pre-production

=== Guest appearances ===
- This Morning (1998, 2014)
- Strictly Confidential: Behind the Scenes (2006)
- Harry Potter and the Order of the Phoenix: T4 Movie Special (2007)
- Loose Women (2011, 2013)
- Big Brother's Bit on the Side (2012)
- Keep It in the Family (2014)
- Lorraine (2017, 2020)
- Benidorm: 10 Years on Holiday (2018)
- Granada Reports (2018)
- Celebrity Antiques Road Trip (2018)
- Tipping Point: Lucky Stars (2019)
- Pointless Celebrities (2019)

== Theatre credits ==
=== Pantomime roles ===
Year	Title	Role	Location
2016–2017	Jack and the Beanstalk	Dame Trott	Theatre Royal, Nottingham
2017–2018	Aladdin	Genie	Swansea Grand Theatre, Swansea
2019–2020	Peter Pan	Kenneth	Liverpool Empire, Liverpool

=== Other theatre roles ===
Year	Pickwick	Fat Boy	UK Tour
2016	Hairspray UK Tour	Edna Turnblad	UK Tour
2018–2019	Benidorm Live	Kenneth Du Beke	250 shows
