= Paul Bazely =

English actor (born 1968)

- Born: Paul Reginald Bazely; 6 May 1968 (age 58); London, England, United Kingdom
- Occupation: Actor
- Years active: 1991–present
- Notable work: Benidorm
- Spouse: Charlotte Jones (m. 1998)
- Children: 2

Paul Reginald Bazely (born 6 May 1968) is an English actor. He is known for portraying Troy in the ITV sitcom Benidorm. His other TV credits include Such Brave Girls, Making Out, Emmerdale, Heartbeat, Doctors, Holby City, Vanity Fair, The IT Crowd and Cruella.

== Career ==
Bazely made his television debut in five episodes of the BBC series Making Out in 1991. Then in 2006, he landed his first starring role as Troy in the ITV comedy series Benidorm, making his final appearance in 2017. In 2016, he appeared in "Shut Up and Dance", an episode of the anthology series Black Mirror. Then in 2020, he starred in an episode of The Good Karma Hospital, and portrayed the recurring role of Grahame McKenna in the BBC soap opera Doctors.

Since 2009 Bazely has narrated a number of audiobooks by the Indian-born spiritual teacher and author Eknath Easwaran, including The Bhagavad Gita, The Bhagavad Gita for Daily Living, Essence of the Upanishads, The Dhammapada, Passage Meditation and Gandhi the Man.

== Filmography ==
=== Film ===
Year	Title	Role	Notes
2003	Three Blind Mice	2nd Exec	Uncredited role
2004	Vanity Fair	Biju	
2011	Pirates of the Caribbean: On Stranger Tides	Salaman	
2013	Jadoo	Kirit	
2013	Tula: The Revolt	Louis	
2017	Star Wars: The Last Jedi	Hux's First Order Officer #2	
2019	Horrible Histories: The Movie – Rotten Romans	Egyptian Legate	
2019	Waiting for the Barbarians	The Herbalist	
2020	Four Kids and It	Sgt. Gascoigne	
2021	Cruella	Police Commissioner	
2023	Dungeons & Dragons: Honor Among Thieves	Porb Piradost	

=== Television ===
Year	Title	Role	Notes
1991	Making Out	Tyrone	5 episodes
1993	Emmerdale	Murray	2 episodes
1993	Casualty	Max Brennan	1 episode
1998	Heartbeat	Dr. Deepak Rall	1 episode
2002	Waking the Dead	Doctor	2 episodes
2003	Doctors	Simon Desai	Episode: "Baby Blues"
2004	Holby City	Joe Sharpe	1 episode
2005	Planet Sketch	Various	13 episodes
2006	Green Wing	Anaesthetist	1 episode
2006	Casualty	Gary Watson	1 episode
2007–2009, 2011, 2016–2017	Benidorm	Troy Ramsbottom	Regular role, 34 episodes (series 1–4, 8–9)
2008	The IT Crowd	Michael	1 episode
2011	Doctor Who	Ven-Garr	Episode: "The Doctor, the Widow and the Wardrobe"
2015	Critical	Giles Dhillon	9 episodes
2016	Black Mirror	The Man in the Woods	Episode: "Shut Up and Dance"
2016	The Hollow Crown (TV series)	Catesby	Episode: "Richard III (The Hollow Crown)"
2019	The Mallorca Files	Hades Jaffar	1 episode
2019	Thanks for the Memories	Frank	2 episodes
2020	The Good Karma Hospital	Sitesh Pillai	Episode 3
2020	Moving On	Peter	1 episode
2020	Quiz	Lionel from Legal	2 episodes
2020	Doctors	Grahame McKenna	Recurring role
2020	The Sister	Graham Fox	4 episodes
2021	Feel Good	Clocky Powers	4 episodes
2021	Midsomer Murders	Paul Matheson	1 episode
2023	Waterloo Road	Ramesh Chowdhury	Recurring role
2023	Citadel	Rahi	1 Episode
2023	All Creatures Great and Small	Joe Coney	Season 4 Episode 2
2023–2026	Miss Scarlet and the Duke	Clarence	Recurring role, Series 4,5 and 6
2023–2025	Such Brave Girls	Dev	12 episodes
