= Janine Duvitski =

British actress

- Born: Christine Janine Drzewicki; 28 June 1952 (age 74); Morecambe, Lancashire, England
- Education: East 15 Acting School
- Occupation: Actress
- Years active: 1972–present
- Spouse: Paul Bentall (m. 1983)
- Children: 4, including Ruby Bentall

Janine Duvitski (born Christine Janine Drzewicki; 28 June 1952) is a British actress, known for her roles in the BBC television sitcom series Waiting for God, One Foot in the Grave and Benidorm. Duvitski first came to national attention in the play Abigail's Party, written and directed in 1977 by Mike Leigh.

== Personal life ==
Duvitski was born in Morecambe, Lancashire to a Polish father and an English mother. She attended Nottingham Girls' High School, then a direct grant grammar school.

She trained at East 15 Acting School in Essex. She has four children, Jack, Albert, Ruby, and Edith Bentall, with her actor husband Paul Bentall. Ruby is also an actress and Edith, Duvitski's younger daughter, is the lead singer of the band Fours.

== Career ==
=== Television ===
Shortly after leaving drama school, Duvitski was given a couple of small roles in television dramas but had no agent, and placed an advert in the Spotlight agency catalogue with a photograph. As a result she was approached by the BBC to test for a play about incest titled Diane, produced in 1975 as an episode in the BBC2 Playhouse series. The part was that of a 13-year-old girl, while Duvitski was then in her early 20s, but her audition was sufficiently convincing to win her the role. The door thus opened to her for more TV and stage roles and, whilst she was appearing in Don Juan at Hampstead Theatre, London, she was spotted by Mike Leigh who offered her the part of Angie in the stage production of Abigail's Party (1977), which she repeated in the television version. Duvitski's principal television credits include the roles of Jane Edwards in Waiting for God (1990–1994), Pippa Trench in One Foot in the Grave (1990–2000), and Jacqueline Stewart in Benidorm (2007–2018). In the BBC's Vanity Fair she played Mrs Crawley. She has also appeared on Lily Savage's Blankety Blank.

She has also appeared in the one-off production of Blue Remembered Hills by Dennis Potter, as well as in episodes of Foyle's War ("Fifty Ships"), Brush Strokes, Cowboys, Citizen Smith, Minder, Midsomer Murders (1998), My Family, Man About the House, The Georgian House, The New Statesman, The Black Stuff by Alan Bleasdale, The Knowledge, Z-Cars, The Worst Week of My Life, Little Dorrit, Still Open All Hours and, in 2013, as Emily Scuttlebutt in the CBeebies show Old Jack's Boat.

In 2015 Duvitski starred in the BBC sitcom Boy Meets Girl. In 2017 she appeared as Mrs Leydon, the Chapel assistant, in BBC's mockumentary Hospital People.

=== Films ===
Duvitski had a small role opposite Laurence Olivier and Donald Pleasence in Dracula (1979), and appeared in the 1980 rock music film Breaking Glass. She also appeared in Michael Crichton's The First Great Train Robbery (1978), The Madness of King George (1994), About a Boy (2002), The New World (2005) and Angel (2007).

=== Theatre ===
Duvitski first came to national attention in Abigail's Party, written and directed in 1977 by Mike Leigh. The play opened in April 1977 at the Hampstead Theatre, returning after its initial run in the summer of 1977, with a total of 104 performances. A suburban comedy of manners, the play is a satire on the aspirations and tastes of the new middle class that had emerged in Britain in the 1970s. In November 1977 an abridged version of the play, lasting 104 minutes, was recorded as a BBC Play for Today. Duvitski plays Angela, a nurse, wife of Tony Cooper.

Her theatre career has also included productions at UK's National Theatre, Young Vic and Royal Shakespeare Company.

In 2007 she appeared on stage in the revival of English National Opera's On the Town. The production, which also included veteran British comic actress June Whitfield, saw Duvitski give a "touching comic account of Lucy Schmeeler, Hildy's homely roommate".

Duvitski played the Vegetable Fairy in the 2017 Sunderland Empire Theatre pantomime Jack and the Beanstalk. In 2019 she played Mummy Bear in Goldilocks and the Three Bears at the London Palladium, and later appeared as Fairy Moonbeam in the pantomime Sleeping Beauty at Sheffield's Lyceum Theatre.

== Filmography ==
=== Television ===
Year	Title	Role	Notes
1972	Z Cars	Ginny	1 episode; credited as Janine Drzewicki
1973	Man About the House	Sheila	1 episode; credited as Janine Drzewicki
1975	Sadie, It's Cold Outside	Lana	1 episode; credited as Janine Drzewicki
1976	The Georgian House	Ariadne	6 episodes
1976	Scene	Gertie	TV series documentary; episodes: "A Collier's Friday Night" (Parts 1 & 2)
1977–1979	Play for Today	Angela; Vera; Audrey	Episodes: "Abigail's Party", "Scully's New Year's Eve", "Blue Remembered Hills"
1978	Miss Jones and Son	Cheryl	Episode: "More Fish in the Sea"
1978	People Like Us	Betsy Symes	TV mini-series
1978	Pickersgill People	Tracey Dawn Tattersall	TV series
1978	Happy Ever After	Cynthia	Episode: "The Hut Sut Song"
1978	The Sunday Drama	Lesley	Episode: "Alphabetical Order"
1978	Premiere	Di	Episode: "One of These Nights I'm Gonna Get an Early Day"
1978	Me! I'm Afraid of Virginia Woolf	Maureen	Television film
1979	Afternoon Off	Doreen	Television film
1979	The Other Side	Gina	TV series; 1 episode
1979	Murder at the Wedding	Gail	TV mini-series; 3 episodes
1979	Citizen Smith	Phillipa	2 episodes
1979	The Knowledge	Receptionist	Television film
1980	Grown-Ups	Sharon	Television film
1980	The Black Stuff	Student	Television film
1980	Minder	Carol	Episode: "The Beer Hunter"
1980–1981	Cowboys	Muriel Bailey	6 episodes
1981	Masterpiece Theatre: Sons and Lovers	Beatrice	TV mini-series
1985, 1989, 1992	Alas Smith & Jones	Unnamed	TV series; 5 episodes
1986	Brush Strokes	Natasha	Series 2, episode 5
1987	Screen Two	Betty	Episode: "East of Ipswich"
1987	Casualty	Joyce	Episode: "A Little Lobbying"
1987	Ratman	Gallery Assistant	
1988	This is David Lander	Sheila Parkes	Episode: "Reduced to Tears"
1988	Number 27	Traffic Monitor	Television film
1989	Mornin' Sarge	Ellen	2 episodes
1990	The New Statesman	Interpreter	Episode: "Who Shot Alan B'Stard?"
1990–1994	Waiting for God	Jane Edwards	Series regular, 47 episodes
1990–2000	One Foot in the Grave	Pippa	Supporting role, 14 episodes
1991	Came Out, It Rained, Went Back in Again	Speaking Woman	TV short
1994	Young Jung	Lotte C.	Television film
1996	Megamaths	Queen of Hearts	Educational series; Episode: "Multiply By"
1996	London Suite	Emma – Nanny	Television film
1998	Midsomer Murders	Deirdre Tibbs	Episode: "Death of a Hollow Man"
1998	Vanity Fair	Mrs. Bute Crawley	5 episodes
2000	My Family	Mrs. Hodder	Episode: "Pain in the Class"
2000	The Mrs Bradley Mysteries	Mrs. Cockerton	Episode: "The Rising of the Moon"
2002	George Eliot: A Scandalous Life	Gossip	Television film
2003	Doctors	Mary Winterbourne	1 episode
2003	Foyle's War	Eve Redmond	Episode: "Fifty Ships"
2003	The Young Visiters	Queen Victoria	Television film
2004	Shadow Play	Katie	4 episodes
2004	Trial & Retribution	Sandra Dutton	Episodes: "Blue Eiderdown" (Parts 1 & 2)
2004–2006	The Worst Week of My Life	Eve	17 episodes
2006	The Children's Party at the Palace	Maid at Buckingham Palace	TV special
2007–2018	Benidorm	Jacqueline Stewart	Main role, 73 episodes
2008	Little Dorrit	Mrs. Meagles	Supporting role, 8 episodes
2009	Kröd Mändoon and the Flaming Sword of Fire	Agnes Grimshank	
2011–2014	This is Jinsy	Mrs. Goadion	Main role, 13 episodes
2012	A Young Doctor's Notebook & Other Stories	Belladonna Zbinka	
2013	Plebs	Soothsayer	Episode: "Saturnalia"
2013–2015	Old Jack's Boat	Emily Scuttlebutt	Series regular, 47 episodes
2015	Crackanory	Phillis / Agnes Sprottle	2 episodes
2015–2016	Boy Meets Girl	Peggy	Main role, 12 episodes
2016	Doctor Thorne	Lady Scatcherd	TV mini-series; all 3 episodes
2016	Houdini & Doyle	Martha	Episode: "The Monsters of Nethermoor"
2016	Still Open All Hours	Elsie Bridges	2016 Christmas Special
2017	Hospital People	Mrs. Leydon	Main role, 6 episodes
2021	Murder, They Hope	Betty	Episode: "The Bunny Trap"
2021	Midsomer Murders	Hattie Bainbridge	Episode: "The Witches of Angel's Rise"
2026	Shakespeare & Hathaway: Private Investigators	Janet Boothroyd	Series 6, episode 4: "The Eyes of the Ignorant"

=== Film ===
Year	Title	Role	Notes
1975	Diane	Diane	Television film: episode in BBC2 Playhouse
1977	Jabberwocky	Fanatic	
1978	The First Great Train Robbery	Maggie	
1979	Dracula	Annie	
1980	Breaking Glass	Jackie	
1982	The Missionary	Millicent, Ames' Maid	
1985	The Bride	Serving Girl	
1988	Drowning by Numbers	Marina Bellamy	
1994	Giorgino	Josette	
1994	The Madness of King George	Margaret Nicholson	
1997	Swept from the Sea	Mrs. Finn	
2002	About a Boy	Caroline / SPAT	
2005	The New World	Mary	
2007	Angel	Aunt Lottie	
2019	Little Joe	Eleanore	
2025	Jay Kelly	Sharon	
