= Benidorm (British TV series) =

British TV sitcom (2007–2018)

- Genre: Sitcom comedy-drama
- Created by: Derren Litten
- Starring: Full list
- Theme music composer: Mark Thomas
- Opening theme: "Benidorm Theme"
- Ending theme: "Benidorm Theme"
- Composer: Mark Thomas
- Country of origin: United Kingdom
- Original language: English
- No. of series: 10
- No. of episodes: 74 (list of episodes)

Production
- Executive producers: Sophie Clarke-Jervoise; Ben Cavey; Derren Litten; Paul Jackson
- Producers: Geoffrey Perkins; Jo Willet; Ben Carvey; Matthew Francis (producer); Lucy Armitage; Simon Bird
- Production locations: Benidorm, Spain: Sol Pelicanos Ocas Hotel; Acuariam II Apartments; The Pink House; Morgan's Tavern
- Cinematography: Andy Hollis; John Ignutius; Alisdar Walker
- Editors: Tim Waddell; John MacDonnell; Nick Ames; Adam Windmill; David Barrett; Mark Lawrence
- Camera setup: Single-camera
- Running time: 23 minutes (2007–2008); 46 minutes (2009–2018) (excluding advertisements)
- Production company: Tiger Aspect Productions

Original release
- Network: ITV
- Release: 1 February 2007 – 2 May 2018

Related
- Benidorm Live; Scarborough

Benidorm is a British sitcom written and created by Derren Litten and produced by Tiger Aspect for ITV that aired for ten series from 1 February 2007 to 2 May 2018. The series features an ensemble cast of holiday makers and staff at the Solana all-inclusive hotel in Benidorm, Spain, over the course of a week each year.

== Plot ==
The series follows holidaymakers who spend a week at the Solana Resort Benidorm, Spain. It is generally the same people who go at the same time of year, usually by coincidence. As people say, those who come to Benidorm "can never stay away" or "never come back". Some higher-class people who come to the Solana are not satisfied with its facilities or the holidaymakers who go there, though others enjoy themselves, mostly due to the fact that it is all-inclusive.

The first four series largely concentrated on Solana guests, with staff acting as background characters. Following the introduction of Sherrie Hewson as new manager Joyce Temple Savage in series five and the return of Adam Gillen as Liam Conroy, previously a guest, as the hotel maintenance man, staff characters became more prominent, with more storylines revolving around the running of the hotel. This gave creator Derren Litten and his co-writers more flexibility in terms of storylines, as they were not necessarily required to reintroduce the same guests in each series.

== Production ==
=== Development ===
In 2006, Derren Litten pitched a new comedy that he had devised for ITV, focusing on an all-inclusive holiday resort, which was later confirmed to be a six-episode series titled Benidorm. The first episode was broadcast on 1 February 2007, opening with 5.86 million viewers and a 26% share between 10pm and 10.30pm. A second series was commissioned, which began airing on 28 March 2008, attracting 7.14 million viewers and an average audience share of 28% between 9pm and 9.30pm, maintaining its strength against competitors. The programme went on to win Best Comedy Programme at the National Television Awards in 2008.

Benidorm returned for an hour-long special on 31 May 2009, serving as a bridge between the second and third series. The third series began broadcasting on 2 October that same year, in a new 45-minute episode format. In 2010, it was announced that the programme would return for a Christmas special later that year before returning for a fourth series in 2011. After cast member Geoffrey Hutchings' sudden death in July 2010 from a suspected viral infection, the Christmas special was heavily rewritten to write his character out. It aired on 26 December 2010 with an audience of 7.41 million.

The fourth series began on 25 February 2011, introducing a new set of characters to fill the void of several cast departures. Litten opted against writing any new episodes beyond the fourth series, commenting, "I'm really looking forward to Series 4 although it is with mixed emotions because, for me, it is the end of my Benidorm journey. I can't begin to tell you what this show means to me, it has changed my life in so many ways. Not least the amazing friends I have made along the way. I won't be writing any more episodes of Benidorm, for me the story of the Garveys and all of the other characters I created ends at Episode 6 of Series 4." However, Litten reversed his decision and agreed to write a fifth series after cast member Steve Pemberton agreed to contribute to three episodes.

The programme continued to gain popularity, winning Most Popular Comedy Programme at the 2011 National Television Awards. At the time of the fourth series' broadcast, Metro reported that the interest of holidays to Benidorm itself had increased by 159%. The fifth series began broadcasting on 24 February 2012, attracting 7.72 million viewers. As part of Sport Relief 2012, Pemberton and fellow series regulars Jake Canuso, Tony Maudsley, Adam Gillen and Oliver Stokes appeared in a sketch as their characters, situating them taking part in a fictional audition for ITV talent competition Britain's Got Talent. The fifth series concluded on 6 April 2012 to an audience of 6.37 million.

In April 2013, it was confirmed that the show had been renewed for a further sixth and seventh series, the former of which had begun filming. The seven-episode sixth series began broadcasting on 2 January 2014, having had a year-long hiatus. In 2014 and 2015, Benidorm won consecutive Best Comedy Show accolades at the TV Choice Awards. In February 2015, it was recommissioned for an eighth series, which began on 11 January 2016. Whilst the eighth series was being broadcast, a ninth series was ordered by ITV, which began filming the following month. In August 2017, ITV dismissed speculation that the show would be ending, citing that the tenth series had been confirmed shortly after the ninth series' premiere. An ITV spokesperson stated that future commissioning for additional series would be determined around the time that the tenth series came to airing.

In July 2018, it was confirmed that Benidorm would not be returning for an eleventh series, just weeks after the tenth series had concluded. Ratings had steadily declined throughout the last few series, with the events of series 10 acting as a conclusion to the characters' journeys. Litten went on to create a new sitcom for BBC One, entitled Scarborough, which featured a variety of former Benidorm cast members.

=== Casting ===
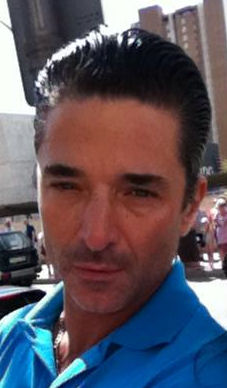
Jake Canuso (pictured here in 2015) played Mateo Castellanos. He was the only cast member to appear in every episode

The Garvey family were introduced in the first series, consisting of parents Mick (Steve Pemberton) and Janice (Siobhan Finneran), teenage daughter Chantelle (Hannah Hobley) and eight-year-old son Michael (Oliver Stokes), with Sheila Reid portraying Janice's mother Madge. Janine Duvitski and Kenny Ireland portrayed the roles of Jacqueline and Donald Stewart, a couple of swingers, whereas Abigail Cruttenden and Nicholas Burns played middle-class couple Kate and Martin Weedon, who were experiencing a nightmare holiday to Benidorm. Comedian Johnny Vegas was cast as pub quiz champion Geoff Maltby, who calls himself "The Oracle", holidaying with his mother Noreen (Elsie Kelly). Hugh Sachs and Paul Bazely completed the original cast of holidaymakers, portraying gay couple Gavin Ramsbottom and Troy Ganatra. Two members of Solana staff were also introduced in barman Mateo Castellanos (Jake Canuso) and hotel manageress Janey Yorke (Crissy Rock).

Geoffrey Hutchings joined the cast for the second series as Mel Harvey, a multi-millionaire businessman who is in a relationship with, and subsequently marries, Madge. Soap opera actresses Wendy Richard and Margi Clarke both made individual guest appearances in the second series as Sylvia, a wheelchair-riding love rival for Madge, and Dorothy, the estranged mother of Gavin, respectively. Sheridan Smith portrayed the role of Brandy in the third series, a loud-mouthed Scouser introduced as a love interest for Martin. Emily Atack had been on standby to take over the role in the event of Smith being unavailable for filming. Series 3 also saw Tim Healy make his first appearance as Les/Lesley Conroy, originally a transvestite blind date for Geoff, who would go on to establish himself as a series regular. Healy reflected on being recruited by Litten for the programme after they met at the TV Quick Awards in 2007: "Derren was in the bar afterwards so I shook his hand and said, 'Well done, man, it's really funny.' I said, 'I'd love to do one.' So he said, 'What would you like to play?' By this time I'd had a few beers so I said, 'Something people would never expect me to play... I tell you what, a transvestite that kills somebody! Anyway six months later a script arrived and I did that one scene with Johnny Vegas [a hilarious blind date] and they asked me to come back and be a regular. So it was me own fault." Other notable guest stars throughout the third series included Robin Askwith playing Gary Snelling, a conman and a thief who was revealed as Brandy's lover, and Una Stubbs, who made an appearance in the final episode as Martin's overbearing mother Diana.

For the Christmas special in 2010, Louie Spence appeared as Marvin, a friend of Donald and Jacqueline who was also a fellow swinger. Spence was reportedly keen to appear in the show, with a source stating, "When Louie was offered a part, he jumped at the chance. He's already learning lines. He's taking it very seriously, as you'd expect from La Spence." Brian Murphy was also briefly introduced as Clive Mitchell, a potential love interest for Noreen; both actors did not reprise their roles for the fourth series. Additionally, singers Su Pollard and Roy Wood appeared as fictional versions of themselves as entertainment acts for the Benidorm Palace, though only Pollard provided an acting entity. Shakin' Stevens had initially been attached to appear in the Christmas special as the closing act though pulled out days before filming due to exhaustion, with Wood stepping in as his replacement at short notice.

Geoffrey Hutchings died in July 2010, resulting in the Christmas special being rewritten to write his character out, in which Mel dies off-screen. In April 2010, it was announced that Johnny Vegas had been axed ahead of the fourth series in order to pave the way for a new group of characters to be introduced. Later that month, Hannah Hobley confirmed that she would not reprise her role of Chantelle Garvey following Vegas' departure, commenting, "The decision was made some time ago that the story between my character 'Telle and The Oracle, played by my co-star and friend Johnny Vegas, had reached a natural conclusion, as the two unlikely lovers walked off hand in hand to the strains of Spanish Eyes at the end of series three." Abigail Cruttenden and Nicholas Burns were similarly written out of the show. Due to his filming schedule for Pirates of the Caribbean: On Stranger Tides, Paul Bazely was unable to commit to the fourth series, though did make a brief appearance in the series' final episode.

Adam Gillen joined the cast in the fourth series as Liam Conroy, the son of Les, as the latter character was developed further as he was promoted as a series regular. Shelley Longworth and Kathryn Drysdale were introduced as friends Sam Wood and Natalie Jones, respectively. Longworth had been amongst several actresses who had auditioned for the role and discovered she had gained the part whilst attending a music festival; she travelled to Spain within a week to begin filming. Drysdale left her role in the BBC sitcom Two Pints of Lager and a Packet of Crisps in order to appear in Benidorm. To fill the void of Bazely's absence, Tony Maudsley was cast as Kenneth Du Beke, a hairdresser at Gavin and Troy's hair salon in Derbyshire, taking Troy's place on holiday with Gavin. Having previously auditioned for the role of Mick Garvey in 2006, Maudsley described Kenneth as "a larger-than-life, colourful character. He has bagged himself a free holiday and is determined to make the most of it. He loves the free cocktails and buffet. Kenneth just wants to have a good time, much to the annoyance of Gavin. He gets involved in a lot of the big comedy storylines." Additionally, Selina Griffiths made her debut in the fourth series as Pauline Maltby, a recovering alcoholic who is the daughter of Noreen, on holiday with her in the place of Geoff. Singer Cilla Black and pop group Bananarama made notable guest appearances during the fourth series.

Fifth series cast

In May 2011, it was announced that Crissy Rock had been written out of the programme to make place for a storyline seeing the Solana under new management. She did, however, make a brief appearance in the fifth series. That August, Sherrie Hewson was confirmed to be joining the cast, taking on the role of Joyce Temple-Savage, the new manageress of the Solana. An admirer of the programme, Hewson stated, "I am absolutely thrilled about joining Benidorm, I have watched and loved it from the very beginning. I am so excited about being part of such an iconic show and working with an amazing cast. My character is so brilliantly written that I can't wait to start filming." Michelle Butterly was cast as Trudy, the new holiday companion of Sam, after Drysdale did not reprise her role. Describing her character, Butterly commented, "Trudy's not a girl to get the wrong side of. As you've probably seen, she gets to head-butt and whack quite a few people. She's bad ass! If you cross her she can be quite violent!"

Upon the announcement of the sixth series, it was confirmed that a new "loudmouth" family from Watford would be introduced: the Dyke family, consisting of patriarch Clive (Perry Benson), his "trophy-wife" Tonya (Hannah Waddingham), their "troublemaker" teenage son Tiger (Danny Walters) and daughter Bianca (Bel Powley). Benson stated that the Dykes would feud with the Garvey family, adding: "They're at war at different points and Madge pours the petrol on the fire." Longworth did not reprise her role of Sam in order to focus on motherhood. Nicholas Burns reprised his role as Martin Weedon for a short stint after a five-year absence, in a storyline depicting him visiting Benidorm with his friends on a stag do. Matthew Kelly also reprised his supporting role of Cyril Babcock from the fifth series. In May 2013, it was announced that Joan Collins would join the cast as Crystal Hennessy-Vass, the CEO of the Solana Hotel Group. Rustie Lee briefly played the role Queenie, a friend of Donald Jacqueline, whereas comedy duo The Krankies and television presenter Janet Street-Porter made cameo appearances during the sixth series.

Ahead of the seventh series, Steve Pemberton and Siobhan Finneran announced that the Garvey family would be departing the show. Both actors wanted to spend less time filming abroad and neither wanted to quit individually, thus collectively agreeing for the entire Garvey family to leave, including Sheila Reid and Oliver Stokes. As part of their exit storyline, Leslie Jordan guest starred as Buck A. Roo for two episodes, an attorney who revealed that the Garveys had inherited $30 million before relocating them to Las Vegas. Waddingham and Powley did not reprise their roles, thus leaving after one series. Charlotte Eaton was cast as Terri Dawson, the sister of Clive and aunt of Tiger, joining them on their holiday. Kenny Ireland pulled out of the seventh series after being diagnosed with cancer with his character being written out. To facilitate Ireland's absence, Alan David joined the cast as Glynn Flint, a new holiday companion for Jacqueline who had reluctantly agreed to a spousal swap. Ruth Madoc made a brief appearance as Glynn's wife Rhiannon, who had been holidaying in France with Donald. In March 2014, it was announced that Johnny Vegas and Elsie Kelly would reprise their roles of Geoff and Noreen Maltby, the latter having last appeared in the fifth series, with news that Crissy Rock would also briefly reprise her role of Janey Yorke.

Ireland died in July 2014 and his character was killed off-screen at the beginning of the eighth series. The Dawson family were introduced, consisting of parents Billy (Steve Edge) and Sheron (Julie Graham), their children Rob (Josh Bolt) and Jodie (Honor Kneafsey) and Billy's father Eddie (Bobby Knutt). After Benson left the series, Nathan Bryon joined the cast of Joey Ellis, a friend and holiday companion of Tiger. Jessica Ellerby was a fellow newcomer, portraying the role of Amber Platt, a new member of staff at the Solana. Of her casting, Ellerby said: "She's really lovely, she's a really nice down to earth girl but she's not stupid. I think that's the whole point, that maybe she looks like it on the surface, but she doesn't take any nonsense. She's very used to working in bars." Paul Bazely reprised his role as Troy Ganatra in the eighth series, becoming the major shareholder in the hotel salon Blow 'n Go, whereas Selina Griffiths reprised her role of Pauline Maltby, holidaying with her mother and brother; both made their first appearances since the fourth series. Having left in the previous series, Sheila Reid made a one-off guest appearance, reprising her role of Madge Harvey, which marked her final appearance.

In 2016, it was announced that Shelley Longworth would reprise her role of Sam Wood in the ninth series, in which she would become a holiday rep within the Solana, having been a holidaymaker during her first stint. The role had not originally been written as a function for Sam's return; several actresses had auditioned for a new character though writer Derren Litten decided that Longworth would be suitable to fulfil the role, culminating in her character's reintroduction. During production of the ninth series, Healy fell ill whilst filming, resulting in him being written out for the second half of the series. Simon Greenall briefly portrayed the role of Neville during the second half of the ninth series, a barman filling in for Healy's character Les during his absence.

Upon the programme being confirmed to return for its tenth series, it was confirmed that Johnny Vegas, Paul Bazely and Danny Walters would not reprise their roles after the ninth series. Shane Richie, who had portrayed the role of Sammy Valentino during a guest stint in the eighth series, was announced to be reprising his role in the tenth series, establishing a supporting role in the cast. Laila Zaidi joined the cast in the role of Cyd, the new South American girlfriend of Rob, featuring in his exit storyline. Additionally, Julian Moore-Cook was also a newcomer for the tenth series, portraying the role of Callum, a new holiday companion for Joey, replacing Tiger. In September 2017, Bobby Knutt died, shortly after filming for the tenth series had concluded; the first episode of the series was dedicated to him.

=== Filming ===
The Solana is the hotel featured in the show, where most of the characters stay. The pool scenes are filmed at the Sol Pelicanos Ocas Hotel in Benidorm, and the room scenes are filmed in the Acuariam II Apartments (which overlook the pool). The reception area and the salon is filmed in a studio set in a building opposite Benidorm Palace, known as "The Pink House".

Neptune's is an all-inclusive bar/restaurant featured in the show, and owned by The Solana. Most of the characters are seen here in the evening, where seemingly there is karaoke and live entertainment every night. Occasional guest appearances take place from singer Asa Elliott, and previously Shaun Foster Conley. Neptune's is filmed in Morgan's Tavern, near to Sol Pelicanos Ocas, where the pool scenes are filmed. Scenes showing cast members leaving Neptune's were filmed using a false facade on the bar area of Sol Pelicanos Ocas, forming a continuum with other outdoor scenes.

== Episodes ==
Series	Episodes	Originally released		Series average (in millions)
Series	Episodes	First released	Last released	Series average (in millions)
1	6	1 February 2007	8 March 2007	4.43
2	8	28 March 2008	16 May 2008	5.98
3	1	31 May 2009		5.23
3	6	2 October 2009	6 November 2009	6.52
4	1	26 December 2010		7.41
4	6	25 February 2011	8 April 2011	7.77
5	7	24 February 2012	6 April 2012	7.06
6	7	2 January 2014	13 February 2014	6.76
7	7	2 January 2015	13 February 2015	5.60
8	7	11 January 2016	22 February 2016	5.32
9	9	1 March 2017	3 May 2017	4.78
10	9	28 February 2018	2 May 2018	4.98

== Spin-offs ==
=== American adaptation ===
In 2016, television network FOX commissioned an American adaptation of the sitcom, to be named The Big Package. The adaptation is set in a Mexican holiday resort, with the plot revolving around a Bostonian family, similar to the Garvey family, who go on holiday to escape their financial issues. The title of the adaptation is derived from the type of three-star resort which serves as its setting and offers a "big package deal". Writers Chris Alberghini and Mike Chessler were to adapt Derren Litten's scripts for the show. The show was slated for a 2017 debut, but, as of 2026, it has yet to be broadcast.

=== Benidorm Live ===
In 2017, dates were announced for a major theatre tour of the sitcom's stage adaptation. It is written by its creator Derren Litten. The tour began in Newcastle-upon-Tyne, England at the Theatre Royal on 7 September 2018. Two hundred and thirty-five shows were scheduled to take place in various locations throughout the United Kingdom and Ireland.

== Awards ==
Year	Group	Award	Result
2008	National Television Awards	Best Comedy Programme	Won
2008	British Academy Television Awards	Best Situation Comedy	Nominated
2011	National Television Awards	Most Popular Comedy Programme	Won
2012	National Television Awards	Most Popular Situation Comedy Programme	Nominated
2013	National Television Awards	Most Popular Situation Comedy Programme	Nominated
2014	TV Choice Awards	Best Comedy Show	Won
2015	National Television Awards	Comedy	Nominated
2015	TV Choice Awards	Best Comedy Show	Won
2016	National Television Awards	Comedy	Nominated
2018	TV Choice Awards	Best Comedy Show	Won
