= Jake Canuso =

British actor & dancer (born 1970)

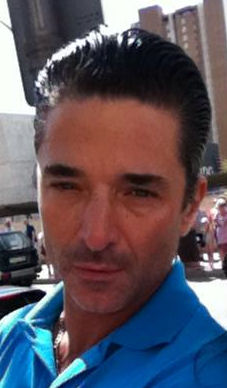
- Canuso in 2015 while in character of Mateo Castellanos in Benidorm
- Born: 1970 (age 55–56); Zurich, Switzerland
- Citizenship: Switzerland; United Kingdom
- Occupation: Actor
- Years active: 1990–present
- Known for: Role of Mateo Castellanos in: Benidorm (2007–2018); Benidorm Live (2018–2019)
- Spouse: Derren Litten (div. 2024)

Jake Canuso (born 1970) is a Swiss-British actor, best known for his role in the ITV comedy series Benidorm, in which he played the Solana barman Mateo Castellanos from 2007 until 2018. Canuso was a professional dancer for eighteen years, working with artists Kylie Minogue, Rozalla, Spice Girls, Annie Lennox and Elton John.

== Early life ==
Canuso was born near Zurich, Switzerland, to immigrants from southern Italy. He moved to the United Kingdom as a young boy.

== Career ==
Previously a dancer, Canuso appeared dressed as a ballet dancer in the music video for "No More I Love You's" by Annie Lennox. He also appeared in the video of Kakko's 1990 song "We Should Be Dancing", JX's "Son of a Gun", Alex Party's "Don't Give Me Your Life", Carter USM's "Let's Get Tattoos", 2 unlimited's "Here I Go", and Emma Bunton's "Crickets Sing for Anamaria". Canuso also toured as a dancer for acts including the Spice Girls, Elton John and Annie Lennox. He also appeared as a dancer on Top of the Pops.

Between 2007-2018, Canuso featured in the ITV comedy series Benidorm as flirtatious barman Mateo Castellanos and is the sitcom's longest-serving actor, appearing in all 74 episodes. Canuso was chosen along with several other members of the cast to star in Benidorm Live, a touring stage adaptation of the show.

In January 2013, Canuso participated in ITV diving show Splash!, hosted by Gabby Logan and Vernon Kay.

Canuso has performed in numerous pantomimes. In 2022, he appeared as Abanazar in Aladdin, which was staged at the Rhyl Pavilion Theatre.

== Personal life ==
Canuso was married to Benidorm creator Derren Litten but they separated in late 2022 and divorced in August 2024.

He survived the Indian Ocean tsunami on 26 December 2004, whilst on holiday in Ko Phra Thong, Thailand. He climbed a tree after seeing the first waves, and was trapped underwater after the tree snapped. He developed aquaphobia and did not swim for several years.

== Credits ==
=== Film ===
Year	Title	Role	Notes
2004	School for Seduction	Giovanni	
2004	Piccadilly Jim	Marcel	
2005	Kinky Boots	Waiter	
2005	Russian Dolls	Miguel	
2006	In A Day	Italian Waiter	
2006	Flyboys	French Infantryman	
2006	Flirting with Flamenco	Pablo	
2007	Tick Tock Lullaby	Laurence	
2008	Journal of a Contract Killer	Alessandro	
2009	City Rats	Marco Harper	
2009	Nine	Reporter 4	
2011	Naachle London	Alan	
2012	The Dark Knight Rises	Waiter in Florence café	
2019	Fork	Robert Medlow	
2019	Wisteria Cottage	Carl	Short film
2024	Fyre Rises	Alejandro	

=== Television ===
Year	Title	Role	Notes
2004	Hustle	Barman	Series 1 episode 5: A Touch of Class
2004	Keen Eddie	Michael Hoffman	Series 1 episode 13: Liberté, Egalité, Fraternité
2005	Heartbeat	Giovanni Viora	Series 14 episode 15: Icon
2005	Casualty	Matt Franks	Series 19 episode 40: Swallowers
2006	Doctors	Andy Clark	Series 7 episode 155: Ignorance is Bliss
2007	Suburban Shootout	Yuri	1 episode
2007–2018	Benidorm	Mateo Castellanos	74 episodes
2009	Shameless	Damien di Soto	Series 6 episode 4: Loving Wife
2012	The Hour	Peter Grey	Series 2 episode 3: Vice
2013	The Bible	Daniel	9 episodes
2013	Bad Education	Javier	Series 2 episode 7
2014	Cardinal Burns	Priest	Series 2 episode 5: The Priest
2017	Snatch	Petru	1 episode
2017	Drunk History	Various characters	5 episodes; series 3
2018	The Royals	Javier	1 episode
2019	Scarborough	Tony Peroni	6 episodes
2019	MyBad!	Stewie	Television film
2024	Grace	Pierre	Series 4, episode 4

=== Music videos ===
Year	Artist	Title
1991	Kylie Minogue	Give Me Just A Little More Time
1994	Carter USM	Let's Get Tattoos
1994	JX	Son of a Gun
1995	2 Unlimited	Here I Go
1995	Alex Party	Don't Give Me Your Life
1995	Annie Lennox	No More I Love You's
1997	Spice Girls	Too Much
2004	Emma Bunton	Crickets Sing for Anamaria

=== Theatre ===
Year	Title	Role	Location
2014–2015	Aladdin	Abanazar	The Forum, Billingham
2015–2016	Jack & the Beanstalk	Jack	Alhambra Theatre, Bradford
2017–2018	Mother Goose	Demon Vanity	Sheffield Lyceum, Sheffield
2018–2019	Benidorm Live	Mateo Castellanos	UK tour with 250 shows
2019–2020	Aladdin	The Genie	New Theatre, Hull
2022	Aladdin	Abanazar	Rhyl Pavilion Theatre

=== Video games ===
Year	Title	Role	Notes
2004	Driver 3	Didier Dubois, additional voices	
2012	Professor Layton vs. Ace Attorney	Additional voices	
