= Benidorm series 7 =

Seventh season of television series

Benidorm
- Series 7
- Starring: Jake Canuso; Sherrie Hewson; Tim Healy; Janine Duvitski; Adam Gillen; Tony Maudsley; Danny Walters; Perry Benson; Alan David; Steve Pemberton; Siobhan Finneran; Sheila Reid; Charlotte Eaton; Elsie Kelly; Johnny Vegas; Crissy Rock
- No. of episodes: 7

Release
- Original network: ITV
- Original release: 2 January – 13 February 2015

Series chronology
- ← Previous; Series 6 Next → Series 8

The seventh series of the ITV television series Benidorm, which is a sitcom set in an all-inclusive holiday resort (The Solana) in Benidorm, Spain, began broadcasting on 2 January 2015, consisting of seven episodes. The entire series was written by Derren Litten whereas both Sandy Johnson and David Sant were credited as individual directors throughout the series. This was the final series to feature the Garvey family, consisting of Mick (Steve Pemberton), Janice (Siobhan Finneran), Michael Garvey (Oliver Stokes) and Janice's mother Madge Barron (Sheila Reid), though Reid did briefly return in the eighth series. Furthermore, it was the first series not to feature Donald Stewart (Kenny Ireland), due to Ireland's diagnosis of cancer and subsequent death. Janine Duvitski reprised her role of Jacqueline Stewart, the character's wife, who was joined by newcomer Glynn (Alan David). Other returning cast members included Tiger (Danny Walters) and Clive Dyke (Perry Benson), who were joined by Terry Dyke (Charlotte Eaton); hairdressers Liam Conroy (Adam Gillen) and Kenneth Du Beke (Tony Maudsley); and Solana staff, consisting of barmen Mateo Castellanos (Jake Canuso) and Les/Lesley Conroy (Tim Healy), and manageress Joyce Temple-Savage (Sherrie Hewson). Elsie Kelly and Johnny Vegas, who are both original cast members of the programme, also reprised their roles during the seventh series.

== Cast ==
=== Main ===
- Jake Canuso as Mateo Castellanos
- Sherrie Hewson as Joyce Temple-Savage
- Tim Healy as Les/Lesley Conroy
- Janine Duvitski as Jacqueline Stewart
- Adam Gillen as Liam Conroy
- Tony Maudsley as Kenneth Du Beke
- Danny Walters as Tiger Dyke
- Perry Benson as Clive Dyke
- Alan David as Glynn
- Charlotte Eaton as Terry Dawson (episodes 1, 3–7)
- Elsie Kelly as Noreen Maltby (episodes 3–7)
- Johnny Vegas as Geoff "The Oracle" Maltby (episodes 3–7)

=== Recurring ===
- Steve Pemberton as Mick Garvey
- Siobhan Finneran as Janice Garvey
- Sheila Reid as Madge Harvey
- Oliver Stokes as Michael Garvey
- Leslie Jordan as Buck A. Roo
- Amanda Barrie as Psychic Sue
- Alice Barlow as Annie Redmond
- Milanka Brooks as Ionella
- Nadia Sawalha as Melanie O'Mara
- Crissy Rock as Janey Yorke
- John Challis as Monty Staines

=== Guest ===
- Joan Collins as Crystal Hennessy-Vass
- Philip Olivier as Jason Gallagher

== Episodes ==
No. overall	Episode	Directed by	Written by	Original release date	UK viewers (millions)
43	"Episode 1"	David Sant	Derren Litten	2 January 2015	7.27 (Note: 5.72 million on ITV, 1.04 million on ITV HD, 510,000 on ITV +1)
The Solana staff are angry, as everyone has been given a pay cut. Tiger Dyke is angry too - his cards and cash have been stolen, so he's relying on his Dad. The Garveys are worried Madge is being stalked, while Jacqueline is holidaying without Donald: they've arranged a wife swap to mark their wedding anniversary - so she arrives with Welshman Glynn.
44	"Episode 2"	David Sant	Derren Litten	9 January 2015	5.41 (Note: 4.84 million on ITV, 574,000 on ITV +1)
The Garveys meet a man called Buck A. Roo who reveals that Madge is about to inherit millions from the Collins family, making Joyce become suspicious, so she orders Lesley to investigate. Meanwhile, kenneth takes advantage of a psychic customer called Psychic Sue, and holds a séance to contact his mum - but the message he receives appears to be for Madge from Mel. Later, Lesley show the evidence to the Graveys about Buck A Roo, and this changes Madge's mind making her want to leave, so the Garveys then leave for Las Vegas.
45	"Episode 3"	David Sant	Derren Litten	16 January 2015	5.45 (Note: 4.76 million on ITV, 687,000 on ITV +1)
Joyce becomes suspicious when Blow and Go appears extremely busy, and how young its customers are looking - even an unusually fresh-faced Mateo. Joyce confronts Kenneth, who is forced to offer her free botox sessions to avoid his secret being reported to head office. Still annoyed at his dad, Tiger hides the news that Auntie Terri is on her way to the Solana resort.
46	"Episode 4"	David Sant	Derren Litten	23 January 2015	5.47 (Note: 4.70 million on ITV, 767,000 on ITV +1)
Liam receives a surprise visit from his mum - Les's ex Gloria. The Oracle is hoping to impress the other guests and staff by walking barefoot across hot coals, and catches Terri's eye in the process.
47	"Episode 5"	Sandy Johnson	Derren Litten	30 January 2015	5.40 (Note: 4.80 million on ITV, 602,000 on ITV +1)
Inspired by a pep-talk from Crystal, Kenneth and Liam launch a Blow and Go makeover competition. Crystal Hennessy-Vass announces that the staff budget is being cut by half - and Joyce is being replaced by Janey, her predecessor. As Geoff's Romanian fiancee Ionela arrives in Benidorm, Noreen discovers that Geoff has told her he is a successful businessman.
48	"Episode 6"	Sandy Johnson	Derren Litten	6 February 2015	4.79 (Note: 4.10 million on ITV, 689,000 on ITV +1)
Jason is back but what is his connection to Janey York? Clive gets swindled out of 5,000 euros by dodgy estate agents Monty and Melanie. The Oracle and Noreen are stuck in a lift, discovering all sorts about each other.
49	"Episode 7"	Sandy Johnson	Derren Litten	13 February 2015	5.40 (Note: 4.72 million on ITV, 681,000 on ITV +1)
Mateo reveals his home life is a disaster, his mother-in-law Dolores is threatening to kill him, so Lesley urges the barman to move out and start a new life. Clive, Tiger and Terri come up with a plan to retrieve Clive's 5,000 euros from dodgy property developer Monty - while Glynn's wife, Rhiannon, arrives at the Solana resort; but there's no sign of Donald.

== Production ==
Benidorm was confirmed to be returning for both a sixth and seventh series in April 2013.

Ahead of the seventh series, Steve Pemberton and Siobhan Finneran announced that the Garvey family would be departing the show. Both actors wanted to spend less time filming abroad and neither wanted to quit individually, thus collectively agreeing for the entire Garvey family to leave, including Sheila Reid and Oliver Stokes. As part of their exit storyline, Leslie Jordan guest starred as Buck A. Roo for two episodes, an attorney who revealed that the Garveys had inherited $30 million before relocating them to Las Vegas.

Charlotte Eaton was cast as Terri Dawson, a new member of the established Dyke family: the sister of Clive and aunt of Tiger. Kenny Ireland pulled out of the seventh series after being diagnosed with cancer with his character being written out. To facilitate Ireland's absence, Alan David joined the cast as Glynn Flint, a new holiday companion for Jacqueline Stewart. Ruth Madoc made a brief appearance as Glynn's wife Rhiannon, who had been holidaying in France with Donald. In March 2014, it was announced that original cast members Johnny Vegas and Elsie Kelly would reprise their roles of Geoff and Noreen Maltby, the former last appearing in the third series and the latter having last appeared in the fifth series. Another member of the original cast, Crissy Rock, also briefly reprised her role of Janey Yorke.

== Home media ==
The two-disc DVD for the seventh series was released in the United Kingdom on 23 February 2015.

The seventh series first became available for streaming through Netflix in the United Kingdom on 10 December 2016.
