= Siobhan Finneran filmography =

Siobhan Finneran is a British actress who has worked in theatre, television and film. Finneran made her film debut starring as Rita in the 1987 film release Rita, Sue and Bob Too. Over the following decade, Finneran established herself as a television actress appearing frequently in both comedic and dramatic guest roles. Into the 21st century, Finneran began appearing in more regular and leading roles in returning and standalone television series. Her more prolific work includes Benidorm (2007–2015), Downton Abbey (2010–2012) and Happy Valley (2014–2023).

Finneran has appeared in several additional independent films, most notably in The Selfish Giant (2013) which earned her a British Independent Film Award nomination. She has also appeared in several theatre productions — including the original production of On the Shore of the Wide World (2005) at the Royal Exchange, Manchester.

== Film ==
Year	Title	Role	Notes
1987	Rita, Sue and Bob Too	Rita	
2007	Boy A	Kelly	
2013	The Selfish Giant	Mrs. Swift	Nominated – British Independent Film Award for Best Supporting Actress
2014	Un illustre inconnu	Elizabeth Travers	English title - Nobody from Nowhere
2016	Somatic	Dr. Mary Thomason	Short film
2016	Broadcast Signal Intrusion	Jane	Short film
2017	Apostasy	Ivanna	
2018	Pond Life	Kath Edlington	
2020	Pace	DS Howard	Short film
2023	Rapture	(unknown)	Short film
2024	The Damned	Helga	
2025	The Stork	Gwenda	Short film

== Television ==
Year	Title	Role	Notes
1989–1990	Coronation Street	Josie Phillips	Appeared between 2 August 1989 and 2 March 1990; 23 episodes
1991	The Sharp End	Tina	Mini-series; 1 episode
1991	Josie	(unknown)	Episode: 1.5
1991	Cannon and Ball's Playhouse: Growing Concern	Carol	Television film
1991–1992	Motormouth	Milly Bates	Series 4; 32 episodes
1993	Heartbeat	Janet	Episode: "Bringing It All Back Home"
1994	Heartbeat	Tax Inspector	Episode: "Wild Thing"
1994–1996	The Russ Abbot Show	Various characters	Series 1 & 2; 15 episodes
1995	Peak Practice	Caroline Royal	Episode: "Light at the End of the Tunnel"
1995	Jackanory	Storyteller	3 episodes: "Improvised Story Telling: Parts 1–3"
1995	Resort to Murder	Lena	Mini-series; 2 episodes
1995	New Voices	Liz	Episode: "The King of Farawania"
1996	Out of the Blue	Fran Paiton	Episode: "Stem the Tide"
1997	Where the Heart Is	Carol Bevan	Episode: "Things Fall Apart"
1998	Hetty Wainthropp Investigates	Peggy Rainford	Episode: "Childsplay"
1998	Emmerdale	Heather Hutchinson	57 episodes
1999	The Cops	Brenda Walsh	Episode: 2.6
2000	Always and Everyone	Karen Boyd	Episode: 2.4
2000	City Central	Carol Bell	Episode: "Community Spirit"
2000–2002	Clocking Off	Julie O'Neil	Series 1–3; 20 episodes
2001	Bob & Rose	Marina Marquess	Mini-series; 3 episodes
2002	The King and Us	Jenny	Television film
2002	Blood Strangers	WPC Melanie Whitaker	2-part drama
2002	Harold Shipman: Doctor Death	Kathleen Adanski	Television film
2002	Sparkhouse	Sue Bolton	Mini-series; 2 episodes
2003	Heartbeat	Gloria Brown	Episode: "Fool for Love"
2004	Passer By	Helen Keyes	Television film
2004	Conviction	Gail Cleary	Episode: 1.4
2005	Dalziel and Pascoe	Susie Ferdinand	2 episodes: "Dust Thou Art: Parts 1 & 2"
2005	Casualty	Sue Stedding	Episode: "The Cost of Honesty"
2006	Johnny and the Bomb	Mrs. Bushell	Mini-series; episodes: "The Butterfly Effect" & "Déjà Voodoo"
2006	The Royal	Rita Hogg	Episode: "Keep On Running"
2006	Wire in the Blood	DI Jan Shields	Episode: "Torment"
2006	The Amazing Mrs Pritchard	Beverley Clarke	6 episodes
2007	Comedy Showcase	Shirley	Episode: "Other People"
2007–2015	Benidorm	Janice Garvey	Series 1–7; 44 episodes
2008	Apparitions	Sister Ruth	Mini-series; 5 episodes
2009	Unforgiven	Izzie Ingram	Mini-series; 3 episodes
2009	The Street	Kim	Episode: "Scar"
2009	Blue Murder	Anita Burgess	Episode: "Having It All"
2009	Coronation Street: Romanian Holiday	Verity	Straight-to-DVD
2010	Casualty	Mel Riley	Episode: "A Day in a Life"
2010–2012	Downton Abbey	Sarah O'Brien	Main role – Series 1–3; 25 episodes Won Screen Actors Guild Award for Outstanding Performance by an Ensemble in a Drama Series
2012	Sport Relief 2012	Janice Garvey	Episode: Benidorm meets Britain's Got Talent
2013	The Syndicate	Mandy Atkinson	Series 2; 6 episodes
2014	Timeshift	Herself - Narrator	Episode: "Bullseyes and Beer: When Darts Hit Britain"
2014–2023	Happy Valley	Clare Cartwright	Main role – Series 1–3; 18 episodes Nominated – BAFTA TV Award for Best Supporting Actress
2015	Midwinter of the Spirit	Angela Purefoy	Mini-series; 3 episodes
2015	The Secrets of the Tea Chimps	Herself - Narrator	Television film
2017	The Moorside	DC Christine Freeman	Mini-series; 2 episodes
2017	The Loch	DCI Lauren Quigley	6 episodes
2017	The Chillenden Murders	Herself - Narrator	2 episodes
2017–2019	Cold Feet	Nikki Kirkbright	Supporting role – Series 7 & 8; 9 episodes
2017–2022	The Other One	Marilyn	Main role – Series 1 & 2; 12 episodes
2018	Snatches: Moments from Women's Lives	Jen	Mini-series; episode: "Multiples"
2018	School for Stammerers	Herself - Narrator	Television film
2018	Doctor Who	Becka Savage	Episode: "The Witchfinders"
2018	James Bulger: The New Revelations	Herself - Narrator	Television film
2019	The Widow	Sally Newell	Episode: "Poteza"
2019	A Confession	Elaine Pickford	Mini-series; 6 episodes
2019–present	Forensics: The Real CSI	Herself - Narrator	Series 1–6; 22 episodes
2020	The Stranger	DS Johanna Griffin	Mini-series; 8 episodes
2020	The Yorkshire Jobcentre	Herself - Narrator	Mini-series; 6 episodes
2021, 2024	Alma's Not Normal	Lin Nuthall	Main role – Series 1 & 2; 12 episodes
2021–2026	Time	Marie-Louise O'Dell	Series 1–3; 7 episodes
2022	Panorama	Herself - Narrator	Episode: "Beyond Reasonable Doubt: Britain's Rape Crisis"
2023	The Reckoning	Beryl Hullighan	3 episodes
2024	Inside No. 9	Edith	Episode: "Boo to a Goose"
2024	Protection	DI Liz Nyles	Mini-series; 6 episodes
2026	Death in Paradise	Fleur Edwards	Episode: 15.3
2026	Unchosen		6 episodes

== Video games ==
Year	Title	Role (voice)	Notes
2017	So Let Us Melt	Narrator	

== Theatre credits ==
Year	Title	Role	Venue
Unknown	An Inspector Calls	Edna	Nottingham Playhouse
2002	Port	Christine / Anne	Royal Exchange, Manchester
2005	On the Shore of the Wide World	Alice Holmes	Royal Exchange, Manchester; Royal National Theatre, London
2014–2015	3 Winters	Masha	Royal National Theatre, London
