= British Independent Film Awards 2013 =

Film award ceremony

The 16th British Independent Film Awards, held on 8 December 2013 in London, were hosted by James Nesbitt. The awards honoured the best British independent films of 2013.

== Awards ==
=== Best Director ===
- Sean Ellis – Metro Manila
- Jon S Baird – Filth
- Clio Barnard – The Selfish Giant
- Jonathan Glazer – Under the Skin
- David Mackenzie – Starred Up

=== The Douglas Hickox Award ===
Given to a British director on their debut feature.

- Paul Wright – For Those in Peril
- Charlie Cattrall – Titus
- Tina Gharavi – I Am Nasrine
- Jeremy Lovering – In Fear
- Omid Nooshin – Last Passenger

=== Best Screenplay ===
- Steven Knight – Locke
- Jonathan Asser – Starred Up
- Clio Barnard – The Selfish Giant
- Hanif Kureishi – Le Week-End
- Jeff Pope, Steve Coogan – Philomena

=== Best Actress ===
- Lindsay Duncan – Le Week-End
- Judi Dench – Philomena
- Scarlett Johansson – Under the Skin
- Felicity Jones – The Invisible Woman
- Saoirse Ronan – How I Live Now

=== Best Supporting Actress ===
- Imogen Poots – The Look Of Love
- Siobhan Finneran – The Selfish Giant
- Shirley Henderson – Filth
- Kristin Scott Thomas – The Invisible Woman
- Mia Wasikowska – The Double

=== Best Actor ===
- James McAvoy – Filth
- Jim Broadbent – Le Week-end
- Steve Coogan – Philomena
- Tom Hardy – Locke
- Jack O'Connell – Starred Up

=== Best Supporting Actor ===
- Ben Mendelsohn – Starred Up
- John Arcilla – Metro Manila
- Rupert Friend – Starred Up
- Jeff Goldblum – Le Week-end
- Eddie Marsan – Filth

=== Most Promising Newcomer ===
- Chloe Pirrie – Shell
- Harley Bird – How I Live Now
- Conner Chapman / Shaun Thomas – The Selfish Giant
- Caity Lotz – The Machine
- Jake Macapagal – Metro Manila

=== Best Technical Achievement ===
- Amy Hubbard – The Selfish Giant (Casting)
- Shaheen Baig – Starred Up (Casting)
- Johnnie Burn – Under the Skin (Sound Design)
- Mica Levi – Under the Skin (Music)
- Justine Wright – Locke (Editing)

=== Best Documentary ===
- Pussy Riot: A Punk Prayer
- The Great Hip Hop Hoax
- The Moo Man
- The Spirit of '45
- The Stone Roses: Made of Stone

=== Best Achievement in Production ===
- Metro Manila
- A Field in England
- Filth
- The Selfish Giant
- Starred Up

=== Best Short Film ===
- Z1
- L'Assenza
- Dr Easy
- Dylan's Room
- Jonah

=== The Raindance Award ===
- The Machine
- Everyone's Going to Die
- The Patrol
- Sleeping Dogs
- Titus

=== Best Foreign Independent Film ===
- Blue is the Warmest Colour
- The Great Beauty
- Blue Jasmine
- Wadjda
- Frances Ha

=== Best British Independent Film ===
- Metro Manila
- Philomena
- The Selfish Giant
- Starred Up
- Le Week-End

=== The Richard Harris Award ===
- Julie Walters

=== The Variety Award ===
- Paul Greengrass

=== The Special Jury Prize ===
- Sixteen Films & Friends (AKA Team Loach)
