= Madge Harvey =

Television show character

- Benidorm character
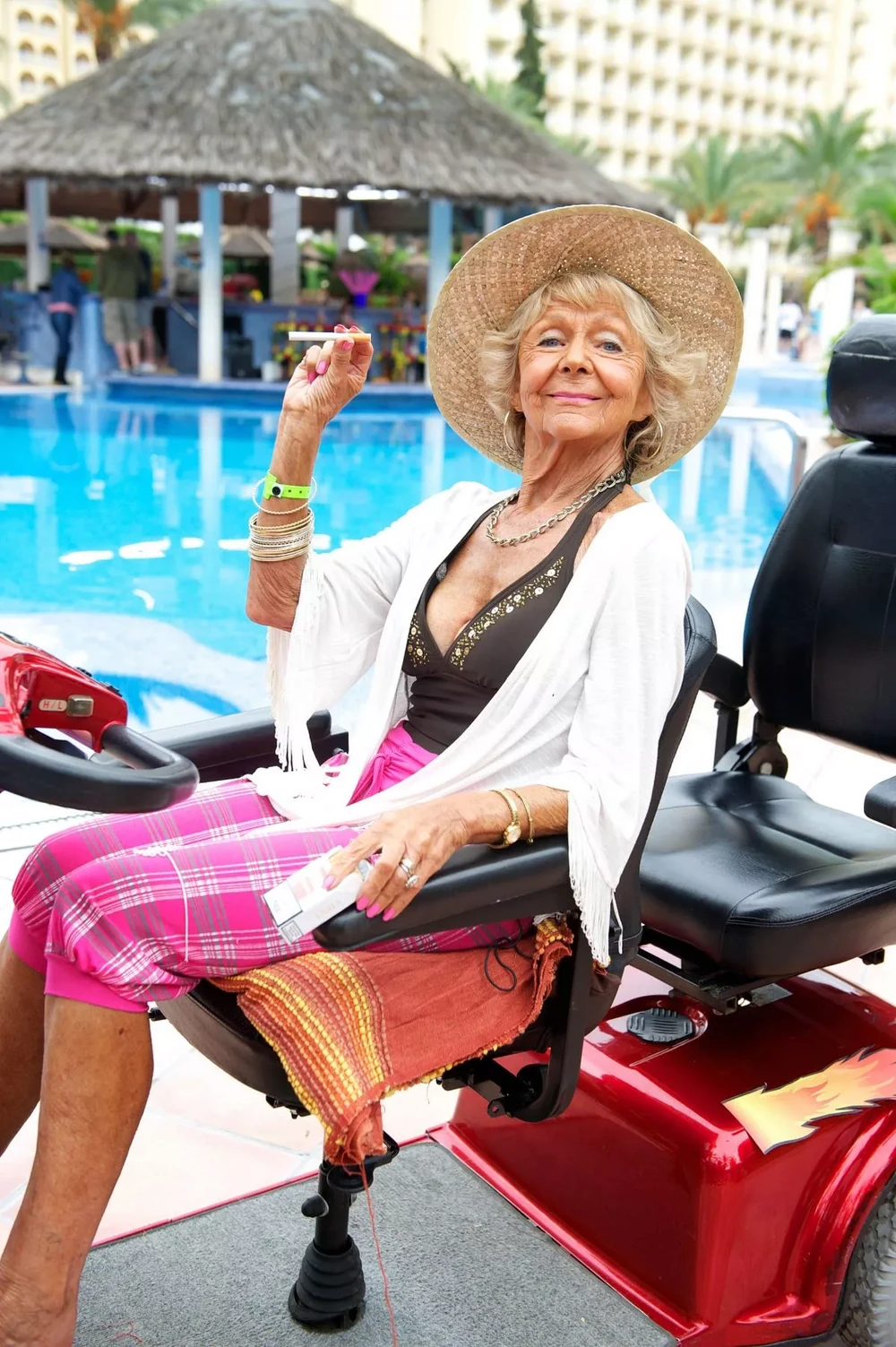
- First appearance: "Episode 1"; 1 February 2007
- Last appearance: "Episode 52"; 25 January 2016
- Created by: Derren Litten
- Portrayed by: Sheila Reid

In-universe information
- Alias: Madge Barron
- Spouses: Unnamed (died 1990) Mel Harvey (m. 2008; died 2010)
- Children: Olga (daughter); Janice Garvey (daughter); Valda (daughter); Cheryl (daughter); Sharon (daughter); Maureen (daughter); Jackie (daughter); Mandi (daughter)
- Relatives: Chantelle Garvey (granddaughter); Michael Garvey (grandson); Coolio Garvey (great-grandson); Pythagoras Maltby (great-grandson)
- Origin: Manchester

Madge Delilah Harvey (previously Barron) is a fictional character from the ITV comedy sitcom Benidorm, portrayed by Sheila Reid. Madge first appeared in the pilot episode of the series, first broadcast on 1 February 2007. Madge is introduced as the mother of Janice Garvey (Siobhan Finneran), the matriarch of the Garvey family, also consisting of son-in-law Mick (Steve Pemberton) and grandchildren Chantelle (Hannah Hobley) and Michael (Oliver Stokes). The character became notable for her chainsmoking, sharp insults and iconic electric mobility scooter. Her main storylines throughout her tenure include her constant family feuds, her marriage to multi-millionaire Mel Harvey (Geoffrey Hutchings), recovering both emotionally and financially after Mel's sudden death, a feud with the Dyke family, her continuous holiday chaos featuring memorable subplots and dealing with her family's constant struggles with money and disfortune.

The Garvey family maintained a central part of the cast for the first six series. Ahead of the seventh series, it was announced that Reid and the remaining cast members of her on-screen family would be departing the programme. They made their final appearances in the second episode of the seventh series, in which they leave for a new life in Las Vegas to claim their million-dollar fortune.

== Creation and casting ==
Annette Crosbie was originally offered the role of Madge and, although she was keen, she had rescue greyhounds and did not want to leave them for a long time filming in Spain. As a result, Sheila Reid was subsequently cast. Although Reid herself is Scottish and is "very softly and well spoken", she portrayed a "sharp Northern accent" to reflect the character originating from Manchester.

In 2014, it was announced that Reid and the remaining members of the Garvey family would leave Benidorm during the seventh series. Speaking on their collective decision to leave, Reid said: "Of course it was difficult to leave. Our family was so much of a unit but it felt like a communal decision to go. Things move on and life continues in other directions. It's a waste of time to regret things. I really believe in looking forward and not looking backwards. It was the right decision". Reid individually reprised her role for a one-off guest appearance in the eighth series.

== Appearances ==
Madge pays for her family to holiday in Benidorm. When she discovers her granddaughter Chantelle (Hannah Hobley) is pregnant, she upsets her by saying she will need to give up the baby and accuses her of elaborately planning the pregnancy to ruin her holiday. Madge accidentally gives Donald (Kenny Ireland) and Jacqueline Stewart (Janine Duvitski) the impression that she is a swinger. She is left disgusted when Jacqueline performs a sex act when she attends an evening at their apartment. However, when they buy Madge cigarettes, she agrees to forget what happened and later invites them to join her family for a day at the beach.

Madge's new boyfriend Mel Harvey (Geoffrey Hutchings) brings Madge and her family back to Benidorm. Her daughter Janice (Siobhan Finneran) is sceptical that a man she has only known for such a short time decided to pay for their holiday and is frustrated when Madge accepts Mel's proposal of marriage. Her grandchildren Chantelle and Michael (Oliver Stokes) convince Madge that Mel has been unfaithful and kissed fellow mobility scooter-rider Sylvia (Wendy Richard). Madge and Sylvia have a cat fight at the pool and Mel assures her that he wants to marry her before they go back to the UK. When her son-in-law Mick (Steve Pemberton) discovers that Mel is a multi-millionaire, he and Janice approve for their wedding to go ahead, ending their previous reservations. During the wedding, Geoff Maltby (Johnny Vegas) accidentally knocks Mel unconscious when he loses control of a paraglider and kicks him in the head. Unable to find a taxi to visit Mel in hospital, Madge and Janice get in a car with criminal Enrique "The Rat" Lopez (Christopher Sciueref). He later tries to make them traffic drugs for him and holds them hostage. Armed with a gun, he leads them to the rooftop, where they are rescued by Mel.

Mel decides to open a mobility shop in Benidorm. At the opening ceremony, a fire is caused by faulty lighting, destroying the shop in the process. Madge's estranged daughter Valda (Lorraine Bruce) stays at the Solana with her young Indian husband Vikram (Amit Shah). Michael inadvertently supplies Madge with drugs from Brandy (Sheridan Smith), causing her to jump off the karaoke stage onto Valda, ending Janice's hopes for a family reconciliation. Mel later decides to buy The Benidorm Palace, an exclusive entertainment venue, resulting in him and Madge relocating to Spain.

Madge suffers financial bankruptcy after Mel's posthumous business deals leave her in debt, forcing her to sell her home to Cilla Black and The Benidorm Palace to pay off the majority of her debts. Janice, Mick and Michael arrive in Benidorm to find her living in poverty in a caravan park. They help eliminate her debts with gangsters Scary Mary (Denise Welch) and Mr Pink (Melvyn Hayes) and a last-minute bet with the latter saw Madge gain €3,000. Madge decides to take on the lease of a failing bar, despite Janice's concerns, and is convinced that Mel is sending her signs, such as the coincidence that the bar is on the same site as Mel's mobility scooter shop. She names the bar in honour of Mel and plans to remain in Spain.

The family return to Benidorm on holiday, revealing that they no longer run the bar. Madge gets embroiled in organ theft that is occurring in Benidorm and is subsequently saved by Mohammed Mohammed (Dhaffer L'Abidine), who claims to be a former business partner of Mel. He states that he has been trying to find Madge to return a cigarette case and an old photo belonging to Mel. Madge agrees to marry Mohammed to avoid legal loopholes involved in transferring money for Madge to retrieve that belonged to Mel. Mick discovers that Mohammed is a conman and believed Madge to still be wealthy. Madge is furious when Mick reveals that the family sunbed business that Mel started has burned to the ground. However, Michael helps to reconcile the family.

Madge causes a scene as the family navigate through airport customs. Having brought tanning pills in her bag which Mick was carrying, Mick is detained by airport security as they test the pills for narcotics. Madge later reveals to her family that she is dying, devastating them. However, Mick contacts her general practitioner and discovers that it was miscommunication and that she had actually been informed that she had to leave the surgery due to her negative traits, including racism and threatening behaviour. The family are left relieved and Madge returns to her normal self.

Upon returning to Benidorm, Madge reveals that she has been receiving concerning mail and believes she may be the victim of stalking. American attorney Buck A. Roo (Leslie Jordan) tracks her down and reveals that, as the last living relative of Mel's ancestors, she is to inherit millions from a hotel built on land she owns in Las Vegas. Despite initially rebuffing this to be a scam, Les Conroy (Tim Healy) confirms that it is legitimate and the family hurry to the airport, joining Buck on a flight to the United States to claim their fortune.

Madge returns to Benidorm alone to buy Michael a holiday home at an auction. She teams up with Solana manageress Joyce Temple-Savage (Sherrie Hewson) for financial gain, convincing Mr Wu (Paul Chan) to increase his offer to buy her property.

== Development ==
Madge is Janice's mother. She is a sharp-tongued, sun-worshipping grandmother! Almost never seen without a fag, Madge is normally either sun-bathing or driving around the resort on her mobility scooter... insulting people. She has a bad word for everyone! Madge acquired a new man called Mel, the owner of five sun bed shops and "Didsbury's answer to Julio Iglesias". He later became her husband. Following the death of Mel, Madge finds herself heavily in debt... and with gangsters after her.

— British Comedy Guide on Madge

Siobhan Finneran, who portrays her Madge's daughter Janice Garvey, considered Reid and her characters to be "polar-opposites". Although portraying a chain-smoker, Reid herself was a former smoker and did not smoke when she portrayed Madge. Further delving into the contrasts between herself and her character, Reid analysed: "Madge says she doesn't like pork in [the sixth series] but she loves bacon, ham and sausages so she quite likes pork really. I don't eat meat".

The character was deemed notorious for her use of a mobility scooter. Reid had never driven a mobility scooter before filming and admitted to struggling to use it at first: "I had a wonderful time in it. But it was great to be back on board. The first time I was in it, we had this tiny little flat we were filming the family in. I was like a mad thing. I didn't know what was forward of back. I ruined everything. Now I'm a pro". Reflecting on the cultural impact of this element of her character, Reid said: "The scooter thing has taken off to such an extent. There are hen parties. They all come out dressed up as Madge and scooter around Benidorm."

== Reception ==
Discussing the enduring appeal of Benidorm, Reid said: "They love it, and it's all ages, all sexes. It's extraordinary. It seems to have touched a vein, a funny bone. What's good is when you go out and meet people, like we do in this hotel corridor, their faces just break into a smile. It's real and genuine, and you think, 'That's nice – we make people really happy.'"

Brian Slade from Television Heaven praised the dynamic between the character and son-in-law Mick Garvey (Steve Pemberton): "The interplay between Sheila Reid's Madge and Steve Pemberton's Mick give rise to much of the fun". Madge's frequent conflicts with various characters gained her popularity, with Patrick Mulkern of Radio Times praising her feud with Sylvia (Wendy Richard): "Their High Noon face-off around the pool in cowgirl hats and mobility scooters is a comedy classic".

== See also ==
- List of Benidorm characters
