= Benidorm series 8 =

Benidorm
- Series 8
- Starring: Janine Duvitski; Paul Bazely; Jake Canuso; Tony Maudsley; Tim Healy; Sherrie Hewson; Danny Walters; Josh Bolt; Nathan Bryon; Steve Edge; Jessica Ellerby; Julie Graham; Honor Kneafsey; Bobby Knutt; Elsie Kelly; Johnny Vegas; Selina Griffiths
- No. of episodes: 7

Release
- Original network: ITV
- Original release: 11 January – 22 February 2016

Series chronology
- ← Previous; Series 7 Next → Series 9

The eighth series of the ITV television series Benidorm, which is a sitcom set in an all-inclusive holiday resort (The Solana) in Benidorm, Spain, began broadcasting on 11 January 2016, consisting of seven episodes. The entire series was written by Derren Litten with Gaby Hull contributing to three episodes. Episodes were directed by both Robin Shepperd and David Sant.

The series introduced the Dawson family, consisting of parents Billy (Steve Edge) and Sheron (Julie Graham), their children Rob (Josh Bolt) and Jodie (Honor Kneafsey) and Billy's father Eddie (Bobby Knutt). Further new additions to the cast included Amber Platt (Jessica Ellerby), a new member of staff at the Solana, and holidaymaker Joey Ellis (Nathan Bryon). Returning from the seventh series included Solana staff Mateo Castellanos (Jake Canuso), Joyce Temple-Savage (Sherrie Hewson) and Les/Lesley Conroy (Tim Healy), hairdresser Kenneth Du Beke (Tony Maudsley) and holidaymakers Jacqueline Stewart (Janine Duvitski), Tiger Dyke (Danny Walters), Geoff "The Oracle" Maltby (Johnny Vegas) and Noreen Maltby (Elsie Kelly). Paul Bazely and Selina Griffiths both reprised their respective roles as Troy Ganatra and Pauline Maltby for the first time since the fourth series.

Overall, the series received an average viewership of 5.32 million, a decrease from the previous series, with the first episode gaining 6.82 million viewers. The series concluded on 22 February 2016, which was viewed by 4.68 million. The programme was recommissioned for a ninth series that month.

== Cast ==
=== Main ===
- Janine Duvitski as Jacqueline Stewart
- Paul Bazely as Troy Ganatra
- Jake Canuso as Mateo Castellanos
- Tony Maudsley as Kenneth Du Beke
- Tim Healy as Les/Lesley Conroy
- Sherrie Hewson as Joyce Temple-Savage
- Danny Walters as Tiger Dyke
- Josh Bolt as Rob Dawson
- Nathan Bryon as Joey Ellis
- Steve Edge as Billy Dawson
- Jessica Ellerby as Amber Platt
- Julie Graham as Sheron Dawson
- Honor Kneafsey as Jodie Dawson
- Bobby Knutt as Eddie Dawson
- Elsie Kelly as Noreen Maltby
- Johnny Vegas as Geoff "The Oracle" Maltby
- Selina Griffiths as Pauline Maltby

=== Recurring ===
- John Challis as Monty Staines

=== Guest ===
- Robin Askwith as Marcus Hornby
- Louis Emerick as Norman the Doorman
- Paul Chan as Mr Wu
- Sheila Reid as Madge Harvey
- Milanka Brooks as Ionella
- Michael Fenton-Stevens as Sir Henry
- Shane Richie as Sammy Valentino
- Joan Collins as Crystal Hennessy-Vass
- Adam Gillen as Liam Conroy

== Episodes ==
No. overall	Episode	Directed by	Written by	Original release date	UK viewers (millions)
50	"Episode 1"	Robin Shepperd	Derren Litten	11 January 2016	6.82 (Note: 4.91 million on ITV, 1.30 million on ITV HD, 613,000 on ITV +1)
The Dawsons check-in at the Solana, and Billy is worried about telling wife Sheron that he has agreed that his father Eddie can move in with them when they get home. After Mateo's departure, Joyce interviews unqualified, but outrageously flirtatious Marcus and highly qualified and efficient Amber, with a surprising outcome. Meanwhile, Jacqueline, Kenneth and a returning Troy scatter Donald's ashes from the cross, and Tiger arrives with new friend Joey.
51	"Episode 2"	Robin Shepperd	Derren Litten	18 January 2016	5.05 (Note: 4.44 million on ITV, 608,000 on ITV +1)
Sheron is still angry with Eddie and refuses to have him sit with the family. The Solana has no qualified first aiders, but the first aid instructor cancels, so it is left to Mateo to run the course. Meanwhile, Amber catches the eye of Tiger and Joey, and Kenneth may be in line for a big inheritance following the death of Herbert, until Kenneth gets Herbert's teeth while the money goes to Norman the Doorman. At Neptunes bar, Geoff and Pauline have a round with Joyce and Joey almost strips naked for Amber, surprising Kenneth.
52	"Episode 3"	Robin Shepperd	Derren Litten	25 January 2016	5.09 (Note: 4.48 million on ITV, 610,000 on ITV +1)
Noreen, Geoff and a now teetotal Pauline are back at the Solana, and Eddie has a big revelation for Sheron and Billy. Joyce goes to a house auction and has her eye on a villa, but she faces stiff competition from a surprise bidder. Meanwhile, Tiger and Joey get into trouble with a biker gang, and Troy makes some big changes to Blow 'n' Go, which does not please Kenneth.
53	"Episode 4"	Robin Shepperd	Derren Litten & Gaby Hull	1 February 2016	4.68 (Note: 4.15 million on ITV, 534,000 on ITV +1)
The staff must roll out a new ID card system while Geoff stages an intervention to help Pauline who has fallen off the wagon. Billy and Sheron leave Eddie in charge of the kids for the day and Joyce has got an admirer.
54	"Episode 5"	David Sant	Derren Litten & Gaby Hull	8 February 2016	6.09 (Note: 4.43 million on ITV, 1.15 million on ITV HD, 513,000 on ITV +1)
Tiger and Joey take on a mountain challenge with few provisions – will they make it back in one piece? Romance is in the air at the Solana but Mateo could be in trouble when a violent stranger starts making enquiries about him at the hotel.
55	"Episode 6"	David Sant	Derren Litten & Gaby Hull	15 February 2016	4.84 (Note: 4.32 million on ITV, 521,000 on ITV +1)
Benidorm is gearing up for the British fancy dress Fiesta. The boys' ingenious costumes get them in trouble with the law and Les misses Liam. Mateo scares the punters in his clown costume and Troy is harassed by an unwanted and unstable admirer...
56	"Episode 7"	David Sant	Derren Litten	22 February 2016	4.68 (Note: 4.22 million on ITV, 463,000 on ITV +1)
The Pride of Benidorm Awards are at the Solana and sleazy compère, Sammy Valentino, is causing trouble. Jodi's acting career gets a boost and Blow 'n' Go are awaiting a mystery new stylist. Crystal brings the house down with a special performance.

== Production ==
In February 2015, Benidorm was recommissioned for an eighth series. ITV's Comedy Commissioner Saskia Schuster teased the upcoming series, stating, "The new series of Benidorm will be introducing a brand new family to our viewers." The decision to introduce a new family came after the departures of the Garvey family in the seventh series, which included cast members Steve Pemberton, Siobhan Finneran, Sheila Reid and Oliver Stokes.

The filming of the eighth season began in March 2015 and lasted until early July of that year. In addition to the main set of the series, located in the Pelícanos Hotel, they also filmed scenes in other locations of Benidorm, such as El Castillo viewpoint.

The Dawson family were introduced, consisting of parents Billy (Steve Edge) and Sheron (Julie Graham), their children Rob (Josh Bolt) and Jodie (Honor Kneafsey) and Billy's father Eddie (Bobby Knutt). After Perry Benson left his role as Clive Dyke, Nathan Bryon joined the cast of Joey Ellis, a friend and holiday companion of established character Tiger Dyke (Danny Walters). Jessica Ellerby was a fellow newcomer, portraying the role of Amber Platt, a new member of staff at the Solana. Describing her new character, Ellerby stated, "She's really lovely, she's a really nice down to earth girl but she’s not stupid. I think that's the whole point, that maybe she looks like it on the surface, but she doesn't take any nonsense. She's very used to working in bars." Paul Bazely reprised his role as Troy Ganatra in the eighth series, becoming the major shareholder in the hotel salon Blow 'n Go, whereas Selina Griffiths reprised her role of Pauline Maltby, holidaying with her mother and brother; both made their first appearances since the fourth series.

Despite leaving in the previous series, Reid reprised her role of Madge Harvey for a one-off guest appearance, which marked her final appearance in the programme. In June 2015, it was announced that Shane Richie would be appearing in an episode of the series, portraying Sammy Valentino, a fictional television personality. Adam Gillen, who left his role as Liam Conroy after the seventh series, made a minor guest appearance in their series finale to precede his reintroduction in the ninth series.

== Home media ==
The eighth series was released as part of a two-disc set on DVD in the United Kingdom on 29 February 2016.

The series became available for streaming on Netflix in the United Kingdom on 10 December 2016.
