= Janice Garvey =

British sitcom character

- Benidorm character
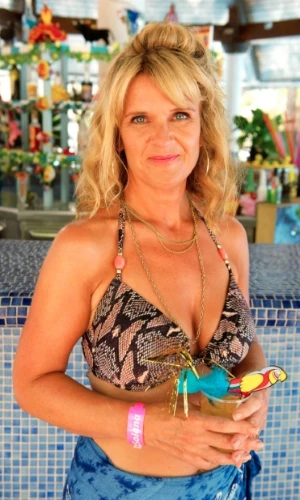
- First appearance: "Episode 1"; 1 February 2007
- Last appearance: "Episode 44"; 9 January 2015
- Created by: Derren Litten
- Portrayed by: Siobhan Finneran

In-universe information
- Spouse: Mick Garvey (m. 1997)
- Significant others: Jonny Neptune; Jack
- Children: Chantelle Garvey (daughter); Michael Garvey (son)
- Relatives: Madge Harvey (mother); Olga (sister); Valda (sister); Cheryl (sister); Sharon (sister); Maureen (sister); Jackie (sister); Mandi (sister); Mel Harvey (stepfather); Coolio Garvey (grandson); Pythagoras Maltby (grandson)
- Origin: Manchester

Janice Garvey is a fictional character from the ITV comedy sitcom Benidorm, portrayed by Siobhan Finneran. Janice first appeared in the pilot episode of the series, first broadcast on 1 February 2007. Janice is introduced as the matriarch of the Garvey family, consisting of her husband Mick (Steve Pemberton), children Chantelle (Hannah Hobley) and Michael (Oliver Stokes), and her mother Madge Harvey (Sheila Reid). Her main storylines throughout her tenure include discovering her daughter Chantelle's teenage pregnancy, her mother Madge's marriage to millionaire Mel Harvey, helping Madge recover both emotionally and financially after Mel's sudden death, her feud with the Dyke family and dealing with her family's constant struggles with money and disfortune.

The Garvey family maintained a central part of the cast for the first six series. Ahead of the seventh series, it was announced that Finneran and the remaining cast members of her on-screen family would be departing the programme. They made their final appearances in the second episode of the seventh series, in which they leave for a new life in Las Vegas to claim their million-dollar fortune.

== Creation and casting ==
Finneran was signed to become part of the original regular cast in the British sitcom Benidorm, which details the experiences of holidaymakers and employees at the fictional Solana hotel in Benidorm, Spain. She made her first appearance in the first episode, first broadcast on 1 February 2007. Finneran described the character as "feisty, foul-mouthed and quite fantastic". Finneran found elements of the shoot embarrassing—including the requirement to be filmed in swimwear— and one scene which involved her character "snogging" a young barman played by an actor in his early twenties. In spite of the outlandish elements of the sitcom, Finneran notes that the cast "tried to find the truth in each character, to make them a real person – not a stereotype." In 2008, Finneran explained that as the series was filmed on location in Benidorm, her parents stepped in to help with childcare back home, with the children visiting during half-term.

In 2014, it was announced that Finneran and the remaining members of the Garvey family would leave Benidorm during seventh series. Both Finneran and Steve Pemberton, who plays her on-screen husband Mick Garvey wanted to spend less time filming abroad, and neither wanted to leave on their own. Finneran found filming her last scenes "heartbreaking", noting she was in "a terrible state" upon bidding farewell to co-stars and crew with whom she had forged a close relationship.

== Appearances ==
Janice's mother Madge Harvey (Sheila Reid) pays for the Garvey family to join her on holiday to Benidorm. On their first day, Janice's son Michael (Oliver Stokes) almost drowns and her daughter Chantelle (Hannah Hobley) faints whilst performing karaoke on stage, where it is revealed that she is heavily pregnant. This shocks Janice, although she does her best to comfort her. Janice also has to deal with Susie (Jan Graveson), a fellow holidaymaker who keeps flirting with her husband Mick (Steve Pemberton). She becomes suspicious when Mick goes missing and is convinced he is cheating on her with Susie. When she hears a noise from behind the pool bar, she confronts them, though is surprised to discover that it was Mateo Castellanos (Jake Canuso) and Troy Ramsbottom (Paul Bazely) in a passionate embrace. When the Garvey family win a pub quiz, they go to the beach, where they are conned by a woman claiming to be beach personnel to collect money they need to pay for sun loungers. Later in Neptune's, Janice sees the woman again and head buts her. Janice notices a woman taking photos of Mick. Initially jealous, the woman reveals she is from the Department of Social Services and that she is going to use the photos as evidence to convict Mick for false incapacity benefit claims.

Madge's new boyfriend Mel Harvey (Geoffrey Hutchings) pays for the family to return to Benidorm. Janice is quite surprised that a man they have only known for a few weeks has taken them on holiday. She is further torn when Mel proposes to Madge, who accepts. Janice tries to convince her not to agree to a wed a man they barely know, believing they are rushing into things. However, she accidentally offends Madge and she and Mel snub the Garveys. To make things worse for Janice, Mick forgets their wedding anniversary which results in her to enjoy the attention from a younger admirer named Jack (Elliott Jordan). Jack ends up stalking Janice and follows her to Neptune's, where they kiss, and proceeds to gatecrashes Madge and Mel's wedding, to no avail.

The wedding falls into disaster when Mel loses his memory after being kicked in the head by Geoff Maltby (Johnny Vegas) and chaos ensues throughout the wedding party. Mel is rushed to hospital, but Madge and Janice's attempt to follow him there takes a turn for the worse when they receive a lift from a mysterious criminal (Christopher Sciueref) on the run from the law. This is caused following a confrontation with Martin (Nicholas Burns) and Kate Weedon (Abigail Cruttenden), the pair fighting for a taxi with the couple, who falsely believe Kate to be pregnant. Madge and Janice are kidnapped and taken as hostages, along with several other Solana holidaymakers, and threatened at gunpoint on the roof of the hotel. They are ultimately saved by Mel, who arrives in a helicopter and knocks their kidnapper unconscious. After this shocking turn of events, Mel is reluctantly accepted into the family by Mick and Janice, their decision swayed by his growing bond with Chantelle and Michael.

The following year, the Garveys embark on a free holiday as compensation for the events of their previous visit. They attend the grand opening of a mobility scooter store on the seafront, which is owned by Mel, but an overload of lighting leads to a small explosion, and a colossal fire wells through the store, destroying Mel's latest business venture. Janice's sister arrives in Benidorm, who later reunites with, and dismisses, their mother. Valda (Lorraine Bruce), who is Janice's sister and one of the seven daughters of Madge, is in Benidorm with her young Indian husband Vikram (Amit Shah), against the wishes of her racially abusive mother. Later on, Madge takes a packet of pills from Brandy (Sheridan Smith), causing her to get high. Whilst performing on stage under the influence of the drugs, she falls on top of Valda. Janice is left hurt and fragile when Madge and Mel announce their intention to move to Spain following their purchase of the Benidorm Palace. Chantelle also announces her own intention to move out of the family home with her new boyfriend, Geoff, when they return to the UK.

The Garveys spend Christmas with Madge at her luxurious villa. Mel, however, is absent, claiming to be working in Morocco. Mel later contacts Mick, explaining that his delayed return is because he is in hospital in critical condition. Whilst watching the Christmas show at the Benidorm Palace, the Garveys received a heartbreaking phone call revealing that Mel has died. Madge remains in Spain after Mel's death. When Janice, Mick and Michael attempt a surprise visit, they are shocked to discover that Madge has mysteriously disappeared and sold her villa to Cilla Black. They track her down and she reveals she has been left financial bankrupt. They help eliminate Madge's debts with Scary Mary (Denise Welch) and Mr Pink (Melvyn Hayes), both local gangsters, and a last-minute bet with the latter saw Madge eliminate her debt, and gain €3,000. When they go to the water park, they meet Pauline Mamood (Selina Griffiths) and Mick has a strange encounter with her. Emotions run high for Janice when Johnny Neptune (Ian Reddington), an old flame of Janice's, appears at the Solana and they have a brief encounter where they reflect on the past. Madge takes over the lease of a bar in Benidorm, which she names in honour of Mel.

Janice, Madge and Michael return to Benidorm on holiday whilst Mick is sorting some things out with the sun bed shops back at home, with Madge revealing that she is no longer running the bar. Janice is shocked to see her stalker Jack but he pretends not to remember her. At the hotel dance competition, he forces Janice to dance with him before Mick arrives puts a stop to it. Janice worries when she hears about organ thieves in Benidorm; when Madge goes missing, the Garveys search for her, concerned about her welfare. It turns out that Mohammed Mohammed (Dhaffer L'Abidine) saved Madge from the organ thieves. He reveals himself to be a close business partner of Mel. He states that he has been trying to find Madge for a long while, returning a cigarette case and an old photo. Janice is very welcoming of Mohammed though Mick refuses to believe his claims. Janice is surprised to find out that Madge wants to marry Mohammed although she reveals their intentions are to avoid the legal loopholes that would be involved with transferring money that Mohammed has for her. Mick later finds out that Mohammed is actually a conman and prevents the marriage. Mick later reveals on the last day of their holiday that new sun beds he had installed in all of their shops were faulty and caused multiple fires. As he had not taken out insurance, they are left with nothing.

When coming through security the following year, Mick is detained at the airport whilst tanning pills Madge brought on holiday are examined. Janice is later left enraged when Michael gets a tattoo whilst on a day out with teenager Tiger Dyke (Danny Walters). Janice gets upset when Madge reveals that she has six months to live. This turns out to be a misunderstanding as the medical practice, having grown tired by her racism and other negative traits, had actually given her six months to leave. Tonya Dyke (Hannah Waddingham) takes Janice to a spa but, when Janice ends up having to pay for both of them, it causes more conflict between the two families. They end up making amends after Michael makes both families believe they are apologetic.

Madge becomes worried she is being stalked when she repeatedly receives unknown contact attempts. They meet an American financier named Buck A. Roo (Leslie Jordan), who reveals that Madge is set to inherit millions from the Collins family, ancestors of Mel. They suspect his claims to be fraudulent so they decline his offer of representation. Les Conroy (Tim Healy) conducts some research on Buck and confirms he was telling the truth. The Garveys hurry to the airport where they catch him just in time, where they all board a flight to Las Vegas for a fresh start.

== Development ==
Janice is Mick's wife — her heart is in the right place but she has a sharp word to say when she disagrees with something... which is quite often actually!

— British Comedy Guide on Janice

The character's narrative function was shaped by the show's emphasis on recognisable working-class family relationships. Finneran described Janice as "feisty and fabulous", while emphasising her strong attachment to her family, noting that "she adores her family and always wants them to be together." A key aspect of Janice's storyline progression is her relationship with Mick Garvey (Steve Pemberton). Their dynamic is depicted as volatile but fundamentally affectionate, aligning with traditional British sitcom pairings. Finneran compared the relationship to classic soap and sitcom couples, highlighting that despite frequent arguments, "they really love each other" and would defend one another when necessary.

== Reception ==
A television correspondent at the Sunday Mirror described the character as a "fiercely protective lioness, humorous, straight-talking, and saucy" inclined to "let-it-all-hang-out" with a wardrobe comprising "skimpy, mutton-dressed-as-lamb outfits".

Discussing the enduring appeal of the series in 2013, Finneran stated that the series' fan base had become firmly established by the fourth series and that viewers were attracted to the "banter" and recognisable family dynamics that take viewers "to the extremes". She also felt that the contrasting summer setting and typical winter air date also provided a form of escapism for the UK audience.

== See also ==
- List of Benidorm characters
