= Pippa Nixon =

British actress (born 1980)

- Born: 1980 (age 45–46); England
- Occupation: Actress
- Years active: 2007 to present

Pippa Nixon (born 1980) is an English actress. She trained at Manchester School of Theatre.

Nixon has had numerous roles in film and television as well as recording drama for BBC Radio, but she is best known for her critically acclaimed theatre work. During her early successful stage career, she took on a mixture of roles in both contemporary and classical writing. In 2011, after stints at Shakespeare's Globe where she was commended in the Ian Charleson Awards for her portrayal of Jessica in The Merchant of Venice, Nixon moved to the Royal Shakespeare Company to take on a number of lead roles. At the end of 2013, Lyn Gardner writing in The Guardian asked 'could your Shakespearean performance of the year be Pippa Nixon's deliciously giddy Rosalind in As You Like It at the RSC?'

== Early theatre career ==
In 2007, Nixon was cast by director Maria Aberg for the Royal Shakespeare Company in Roy Williams’ Days of Significance which played at the Swan Theatre in Stratford-Upon-Avon before moving to the Tricycle Theatre in London. The production was based on Much Ado About Nothing and was commissioned by the Royal Shakespeare Company.

Following the success of Days of Significance, Nixon worked at Shakespeare's Globe in London, where she was commended in the prestigious Ian Charleson Awards for her portrayal of Jessica in The Merchant of Venice. A year later, in 2008, Nixon was cast in Jonathan Munby's Midsummer Night’s Dream, in which she played Hermia, and in the same year, she was also re-united with Roy Williams on his new play Joe Guy at the Soho Theatre.

In mid-2009, Nixon worked with Brooke Kinsella in S-27, and in 2010 the two collaborated again in the Soho Theatre production of Bea. The play was written for Kinsella by director and playwright Mick Gordon after he saw her performance in S-27 the previous year.

== Television and film ==
When Nixon left Manchester School of Theatre, she walked into two series of 24Seven for Granada Television playing Jax Duffy, and following its huge success in the UK, it sold to America and was aired on the Nickelodeon channel. She has also appeared in other major TV series such as Holby City, The Bill and Law and Order. In 2012, Nixon starred as the Lightmaster in John Carter (directed by Oscar-winning filmmaker Andrew Stanton). In July 2014, Nixon finished working on a film called Containment, and also played the leading role of Amy in that same year's film Panic (directed by Sean Spencer). On 13 October 2014, Nixon appeared as Daphne Young in the ITV series Grantchester.

Nixon has played the role of DC Karen Willetts in the ITV drama Unforgotten since 2015, and Alice Gove in the TV series Cuffs.

In February 2016, Nixon starred in the episode “Saints and Sinners” in the long-running TV drama Midsomer Murders.

In April 2016, Nixon starred in the Shakespeare Live event, which was screened on BBC 2 to celebrate Shakespeare 400. Here Nixon was reunited with her As You Like It co-star, Alex Waldmann and together they performed a scene from that famous play.

In November 2017, Nixon portrayed Alice Taylor in the episode “Blade on the Feather” in the medical comedy-drama television series Doc Martin.

In February 2022, she portrayed Saskia Turner in the episode “A Chelsea education” in the television series The Chelsea Detective - S1 Ep4

== Radio ==
In 2013, Nixon was cast in the role of Lizzie Eustace in the BBC radio adaptation of The Eustace Diamonds. Also in 2013, she played Julia alongside Christopher Eccleston's Winston in the BBC 4 Drama Nineteen Eighty-Four as part of the BBC Radio 4 Real George Orwell Season. She played Elizabeth Bennett in a BBC Radio 4 drama of Pride and Prejudice alongside Jamie Parker, Toby Jones, David Troughton, and Samantha Spiro, which was broadcast in early 2014. Currently she is appearing as Celestine de Tullio in the BBC Radio drama, Tommies.

In 2015, Nixon reprised her role as Rosalind in BBC Radio 3's new production of Shakespeare's As You Like It. Orlando was played by Luke Norris who had played Olivier in the 2013 RSC stage version. Later in 2015, Nixon played Lotty in the BBC Radio 4 drama The Enchanted April.

== Royal Shakespeare Company (RSC) ==
At the Royal Shakespeare Company, Nixon played a number of leading roles. The three-year residency with the world-renowned Royal Shakespeare Company was received with wide-ranging critical acclaim.

=== Cardenio and City Madam ===
In 2011, Nixon played Dorathea in Shakespeare's supposed lost play Cardenio (directed by RSC Artistic Director Gregory Doran). Charles Spencer commented in The Telegraph that "Lucy Briggs-Owen and Pippa Nixon give sharply defined neatly contrasting performances as the betrayed girls." In the same season Nixon played the prostitute, Shave'em, in Philip Massanger's city comedy The City Madam, also at the Swan theatre.

=== A Midsummer Night's Dream ===
It was her portrayal of Titania in Nancy Meckler's A Midsummer Night’s Dream that drew critical attention. The production was Nixon's first in the larger Royal Shakespeare Theatre. Charles Spencer writing in The Telegraph gave the production five stars commenting that "there’s a strong sexual spark between Jo Stone-Fewings and Pippa Nixon, respectively doubling as Theseus and Oberon and Hippolyta and Titania." Pat Ashworth in The Stage also commented on the chemistry between Nixon and Stone-Fewings noting that "Jo Stone-Fewings and Pippa Nixon are beautifully paired as Theseus/Oberon and Hippolyta/Titania." Simon Tavener in What’sOnStage.com commented that "Pippa Nixon makes a strong impression as Titania".

=== The Bastard in King John ===
In 2012, Nixon worked again with Maria Aberg in a production of Shakespeare's King John, where she played a female bastard alongside Alex Waldmann's King John. The production which split the critics received a range of stars, and was well received by audiences.

Michael Billington in The Guardian described the performance saying, "Pippa Nixon's Bastard, the illegitimate offspring of Richard I, becomes the key figure in this version; and Nixon successfully turns the character into a perky commentator on, and participant in, the play's world of political expediency." Simon Tavener was full of praise for Nixon's innovative approach to the role exclaiming "Pippa Nixon has been given the part of a lifetime – and she revels in the mischief and wit of the character as well as playing the emotional shifts and inner conflict brilliantly. Outstanding – no other word for it."

=== Lady Anne in Richard III ===
In the same season, Nixon played Lady Anne opposite Jonjo O'Neill's Richard III in Richard III. Commenting on this production, the reviewer in the Stratford Observer felt that "There are some particularly strong performances from the women - notably Pippa Nixon as Lady Anne."

=== Ophelia and Rosalind ===
Most recently Nixon played both Rosalind and Ophelia in the 2013 season. Here critics were impressed with Nixon's portrayal of Shakespeare's rejected and troubled heroine, Ophelia, in Hamlet. Michael Billington in The Guardian wrote, "Pippa Nixon's Ophelia is outstanding: a passionate schoolgirl fatally besotted by Hamlet." Fiona Mountford writing in The Evening Standard was particularly complimentary about Nixon's performance exclaiming, "Pippa Nixon makes a nicely vulnerable Ophelia, forced into renouncing her ardent love by misguided elders." Paul Taylor in The Independent praised Nixon's approach to Ophelia declaring that ‘Nixon's Ophelia who, heart-rendingly, performs the mad scene in pristine white bridal dress and veil, is stunning". But it was Nixon's captivating performance as Rosalind during the summer of 2013 in the joyous production of As You Like It, that was acclaimed by critics. Nixon was again reunited with director Maria Aberg, and actor Alex Waldmann, a working relationship which hailed them as "the two most exciting actors in the company today". The portrayal of Rosalind received exceptional reviews.

Pat Ashworth in The Stage wrote "Maria Aberg says she could not imagine directing this play with any Rosalind other than Pippa Nixon, whom she deems extraordinary. She is. She has a dancer’s body, a spareness and litheness which make her cocky and capering in the guise of a man and deeply vulnerable as a woman. But it’s her openness and quick-wittedness that is so appealing. She makes us able to read her mind, and that really is extraordinary." Lyn Gardner tweeted: ‘Pippa Nixon is enchanting, knee-trembling, sexy and sad in Maria Aberg’s As You Like It. Up there with the greatest Rosalinds’. Simon Tavener reviewing for What’sOnStage.com made the point that, "For my money, Pippa Nixon is the brightest star in the RSC ensemble at the moment and I hope that they continue to nurture and cherish her." Charles Spencer writing in The Telegraph felt that "Pippa Nixon now gives one of the most entrancing Rosalinds I have ever seen." Echoing Spencer, Michael Billington in his review of As You Like It in The Guardian went so far as to exclaim that, "Its chief delight is Pippa Nixon, who, for me, joins Vanessa Redgrave, Adrian Lester and the late Susan Fleetwood in the select pantheon of memorable Rosalinds ... It is a captivating, wittily androgynous performance that ushers Nixon to the threshold of stardom."

== Other theatre work ==
In the summer of 2014, she could be seen on stage in the Theatre Royal Bath production of Helen Edmundson's adaptation of Emile Zola's novel Thérèse Raquin. Michael Billington wrote in his review that "Pippa Nixon is destined for stardom.". He went on to describe Nixon's "great gift is the ability to act with every inch of her body." Dominic Cavendish writing in The Telegraph said, "Rising star Pippa Nixon succeeds splendidly in suggesting Thérèse’s unbridled yearning with her bright, watchful eyes - an alluring force of suppressed nature in a voluminous turquoise dress." Paul Taylor in The Independent was equally positive about Pippa's performance and said "The glorious Pippa Nixon delivers a performance perfectly pitched to the production's propulsive, light-on-its-casters blend of the realist and the expressionist." The Observer review headline made the point that, "Pippa Nixon is a compelling presence."

Nixon has been cast as Ariel in the Sam Wanamaker Playhouse production of The Tempest.

In 2016, Nixon made her debut at the National Theatre playing the role of Charlotte in Sunset at the Villa Thalia by Alexi Kaye Campbell.
