= Metro Manila (film) =

2013 British crime drama film

- Directed by: Sean Ellis
- Written by: Sean Ellis; Frank E. Flowers
- Produced by: Mathilde Charpentier; Sean Ellis
- Starring: Jake Macapagal; Althea Vega; John Arcilla
- Cinematography: Sean Ellis
- Edited by: Richard Mettler
- Music by: Robin Foster
- Production company: Chocolate Frog Films
- Distributed by: Independent Entertainment
- Release dates: 20 January 2013 (Sundance); 20 September 2013 (United Kingdom)
- Running time: 114 minutes
- Country: United Kingdom
- Languages: Filipino; English

Metro Manila is a 2013 Filipino-language British crime drama film directed by Sean Ellis. Set in the Philippines, it focuses on a rice farmer relocating his family to the country's metropolitan capital in search of a better life. Ellis also co-produced and co-wrote the film. The film was selected as the British entry for the Best Foreign Language Film at the 86th Academy Awards, but was not nominated.

== Plot ==
Oscar Ramirez, a rice farmer from Banaue, Ifugao Province, (Note: Erroneously referred to as Banaue Province) relocates to Metro Manila with his family in hopes of obtaining a better life after his rice crops are no longer profitable. While searching for a job, Oscar is offered a low-cost room to rent but this is a scam as the next day, his family is evicted by the police from the building for squatting. The family moves into a vacant shanty house in the slums of Tondo, which is rife with criminal activity. Oscar secures a job as a security officer for Manila Armored Couriers after the other guards discover his military background.

On Oscar's first day and night at work with his partner Ong, the two exchange stories. Ong lost his previous partner in a failed robbery six months prior; Oscar once worked at a silk factory with Alfred Santos, who was forced into armed robbery on a passenger airline after losing his father and his family's silk factory to a rival company. Oscar felt responsible for failing to stand up with Alfred, who ultimately perished after jumping off the plane with his loot.

Concerned about Oscar residing in Tondo, Ong offers a spare apartment unit in Makati for Oscar and his family. Meanwhile, Mai lands a job as a hostess at a nightclub in Makati. While undergoing the mandatory physical checkup, she finds out she is pregnant. When she fails to make her drink quota and her pregnancy grows more evident, her boss proposes to have Mai's nine-year-old child Angel work for "special clients."

On a routine job after delivering their handouts to a rapper who is also a drug dealer, Ong and Oscar have a tense discussion about corruption. When Ong pulls over ostensibly for a toilet break, Oscar suddenly sees a black Honda Civic that has been stalking them on the first day pull over with a group of men heading toward Ong's direction. Concerned, he exits the armored van and follows the gang on foot to save Ong, only to discover that they are in cahoots with Ong.

Ong tells Oscar that he took a security box with him after the failed robbery, and is plotting with the gang to have the box opened by staging a robbery and having himself "debriefed" in the company's processing center. The plan is for Oscar to make an imprint of the key in another room for use in unlocking the box. Ong blackmails Oscar into participating, threatening to frame him as the man who hid the security box in the apartment under his own name. The plan goes wrong as Ong realizes that the man in front of him is not part of the gang but the one who escaped when his former partner was killed; the man promptly kills Ong. Oscar is given the grievous task of "postman", who must deliver Ong's personal effects and severance pay to his widow Dora.

Upon learning that Ong's wife is aware of the security box, Oscar races back home and finds it under the floor. He and Mai face the dilemma of what to do with the box. Mai tells him it was a mistake for them to move to the city. One night after a delivery job, Oscar sneaks into the processing center and takes an imprint of the key while stealing another; he is quickly caught on security camera and fatally shot. Misled by the key Oscar stole, the company rushes armed men to the address of the drug dealer client while JJ, Oscar's new partner, delivers Oscar's personal effects to Mai. She notices a locket that Oscar stole from a shop earlier that morning; upon opening it, she discovers a clay imprint of the key to the security box. After getting the key duplicated, she leaves the city with her children by bus, with a rucksack full of money between her feet. The final events of the movie are narrated by Oscar.

== Cast ==
- Jake Macapagal as Oscar Ramirez
- Althea Vega as Mai Ramirez
- John Arcilla as Douglas Ong
- Erin Panlilio as Angel Ramirez
- Iasha Aceio as Baby Ramirez
- Moises Mag Isa as Buddha
- Angelina Kanapi as Charlie
- JM Rodriguez as Alfred Santos
- Ana Abad Santos as Dora Ong
- Reuben Uy as JJ
- Ann Estrada as Bridget
- Gabs Santos as Pino
- Leon Miguel as White-eyed Man

== Production ==
Director Sean Ellis took inspiration from his first trip to the Philippines when he witnessed two armoured truck drivers arguing with each other.

The film was shot on location in the Philippines in 2011 with a Filipino cast and crew members. The script was written in English, but Ellis encouraged the cast to interpret their lines in Filipino. Ellis used a Canon EOS 5D DSLR camera to capture the footage.

The story of Alfred Santos is based on the Philippine Airlines Flight 812 hijacking on 25 May 2000.

== Release ==
Metro Manila had its world premiere at the 2013 Sundance Film Festival on 20 January 2013. In the UK, it was released on 20 September 2013, while it had its Philippine premiere on 9 October 2013.

The film was re-released with special screenings to raise money for the victims of Typhoon Haiyan/Yolanda that had hit the Philippines and killed close to 6000 people. Ellis said: "The people of the Philippines were tremendously supportive during the making of Metro Manila, and it's only right that we should now use the film to raise money to help the victims of this terrible disaster."

== Critical reception ==
On the review aggregator website Rotten Tomatoes, 94% of 33 critics' reviews are positive, with an average rating of 7.4/10. The website's consensus reads: "Infusing thriller tropes with a searing glimpse of modern-day corruption, Metro Manila is just as gripping as any action blockbuster — and twice as thought-provoking." Metacritic, which uses a weighted average, assigned the film a score of 65 out of 100, based on 11 critics, indicating "generally favorable" reviews.

After winning the Film Critic Award at the 2013 Filmfest Hamburg, the jury said of the film: "The themes of our times are what define this film: rural exodus and impoverishment, exploitation and poverty in the Moloch of overcrowded metropolises. Director Sean Ellis filmed this story in a language that is foreign to him - and yet still always manages to hit the right tone. He is emotional, yet never impassioned; poetic, yet never tawdry; raw without any hint of cynicism. A social drama that becomes a thriller, breathless and unstoppable. 'Metro Manila' deserves to be seen by many. This film belongs in the cinema. ..."

Acclaimed Spanish director Pedro Almodóvar listed the film as one of his personal favorite films of 2013.

== Accolades ==
At the 2013 British Independent Film Awards, Metro Manila was nominated in five categories and won awards for Achievement in Production, Best Director and Best British Independent Film.

List of Accolades
Award / Film Festival	Category	Nominee(s)	Result
British Academy Film Awards	Best Film Not in the English Language	Sean Ellis, Mathilde Charpentier	Nominated
Sundance Film Festival	Audience Award: World Dramatic	Sean Ellis	Won
Sundance Film Festival	Grand Jury Prize: World Dramatic	Sean Ellis	Nominated
Filmfest Hamburg	Hamburg Film Critic Award	Sean Ellis	Won
Polar Festival de Cognac	Grand Jury Prize	Sean Ellis	Won
Seminci	Espiga de Oro: Gold Spike	Sean Ellis	Nominated
Seminci	Espiga de Plata: Silver Spike	Sean Ellis	Nominated
Seminci	Best Director	Sean Ellis	Nominated
Seminci	Best Script	Sean Ellis	Nominated
Seminci	Best Cinematography	Sean Ellis	Nominated
Amazonas Film Festival	Best Director	Sean Ellis	Won
Amazonas Film Festival	Best Script	Sean Ellis	Won
Amazonas Film Festival	Audience Award	Sean Ellis	Won
British Independent Film Awards	Best British Independent Film		Won
British Independent Film Awards	Best Director	Sean Ellis	Won
British Independent Film Awards	Best Supporting Actor	John Arcilla	Nominated
British Independent Film Awards	Most Promising Newcomer	Jake Macapagal	Nominated
British Independent Film Awards	Best Achievement in Production		Won
Satellite Awards	Best Foreign Language Film		Nominated
World Soundtrack Awards	Public Choice Award	Robin Foster	Nominated
Writers Guild of Great Britain	Best Screenplay	Sean Ellis & Frank E Flowers	Won

== See also ==
- CityLights - The 2014 Indian remake
- List of submissions to the 86th Academy Awards for Best Foreign Language Film
- List of British submissions for the Academy Award for Best Foreign Language Film
