= Robert Holman =

British dramatist (1952–2021)

- Born: 1952; Guisborough, Yorkshire, England
- Died: 3 December 2021 (aged 69)
- Occupation: Playwright
- Writing career
- Language: English

Robert Holman (1952 – 3 December 2021) was a British dramatist whose work has been produced by the Royal Shakespeare Company (RSC) and the Royal Court Theatre, as well as in the West End and elsewhere, since the 1970s. He was a resident dramatist at both the RSC and the National Theatre.

== Career and reputation ==
Holman was brought up on a farm in North Yorkshire and worked as a bookshop assistant at Paddington station for three years after leaving school before receiving an Arts Council bursary in 1974. From then on, he wrote plays which have impressed critics, directors and actors, without ever becoming what might be termed a fashionable writer. His plays tend to concentrate on the emotional lives of seemingly ordinary people, although he writes in his 1992 novel The Amish Landscape that "Most people think they live ordinary lives, but nobody's life is ordinary, is it?" Unlike more obviously politically committed writers – for example Edward Bond, Caryl Churchill or David Hare – Holman writes neither issue plays nor ones which lead audiences to predetermined ideological ends. His plays are often set in specific landscapes, with scenes set out of doors preferred over domestic interiors. Recurring tropes in his plays include the family, intergenerational relationships and meetings between strangers. Academic commentary on Holman's work is scarce. Critical reaction has wavered from the enthusiastic and respectful to the bemused, the latter especially when his 1984 play Other Worlds featured a talking monkey.

Holman's work has been produced at a variety of venues since the 1970s. The venues for the premieres of these plays tended to be subsidised new writing theatres such as the Royal Court and the Bush Theatre, as well as the studio spaces of the Royal Shakespeare Company. In 1999, his trilogy of short plays Making Noise Quietly was revived by the Oxford Stage Company in the West End at the Whitehall Theatre. In 2003, as well as the premiere of a new play at Chichester, there was a major retrospective of his work at the Royal Exchange Theatre. In 2008, Jonah and Otto premiered at the Royal Exchange Theatre with Ian McDiarmid and Andrew Sheridan. In 2012, Making Noise Quietly was revived at the Donmar Warehouse, directed by Peter Gill. In 2014, Jonah and Otto was revived at London's Park Theatre, in a production directed by Tim Stark. In 2016, German Skerries was revived at the Orange Tree Theatre, in a production directed by Alice Hamilton.

Holman was an acknowledged inspiration for some of the younger generation of British playwrights, including David Eldridge and Simon Stephens. In 2010, the three men collaborated on The Thousand Stars in the Sky, performed at the Lyric Hammersmith. A documentary, Robert Holman, A Writer's Writer was made by the Donmar Warehouse, celebrating Holman's influence on younger writers including David Eldridge, Simon Stephens, Samantha Ellis, and Duncan Macmillan.

Holman died on 3 December 2021, at the age of 69.

== Plays ==
- The Grave Lovers (1972)
- Progress in Unity (Middlesbrough Town Hall, 1972)
- Coal (1973)
- The Nature Cause (Cockpit Theatre, 1974)
- Mud (Royal Court Theatre Upstairs, 1974)
- Outside the Whale (Traverse Theatre, 1976)
- German Skerries (Bush Theatre, 1977)
- Mucking Out (BBC Second City Firsts 1978)
- Rooting (Traverse Theatre, 1979)
- The Estuary (Bush Theatre, 1980)
- Chance of a Lifetime (BBC Play for Today, 1980)
- Other Worlds (Royal Court, 1983)
- Today (RSC, 1984)
- The Overgrown Path (Royal Court Theatre, 1985)
- This is History Gran (BBC, 1986)
- Being Friends (Bush Theatre, 1986)
- Lost (Bush Theatre, 1986)
- Making Noise Quietly (Bush Theatre, 1987)
- Across Oka (RSC, 1988)
- Rafts and Dreams (Royal Court Theatre Upstairs, 1990)
- Bad Weather (RSC, 1998)
- Holes in the Skin (Chichester Festival Theatre, 2003)
- Jonah and Otto (Royal Exchange Theatre, 2008; Park Theatre, 2014)
- A Thousand Stars Explode in the Sky (Lyric Hammersmith, 2010) written with David Eldridge and Simon Stephens
- A Breakfast of Eels (The Print Room Theatre, 2015)
- The Lodger (Coronet Theatre, 2021)

== Novel ==
- The Amish Landscape (Nick Hern Books, 1992)
