= Rafts and Dreams =

1990 English play by Robert Holman

- Written by: Robert Holman
- Characters: Neil Bell; Hetty; Leo; Jo; Alex; Woman
- Original language: English
- Subject: child abuse, rising sea levels
- Setting: London, a raft at sea, an iceberg, Africa

Premiere
- Date premiered: October 4, 1990
- Place premiered: Royal Court Theatre Upstairs, London

Rafts and Dreams is a play by English playwright Robert Holman that was first performed in 1990, and published in 1991.

== Plot ==
Beginning as a seeming domestic drama, Rafts and Dreams shows the relationship between obsessive-compulsive mysophobe Hetty and her soldier husband Leo, and their neighbour Neil – a victim of childhood sexual abuse who is now studying to be a doctor. However, when Leo and Neil remove a tree stump from Leo's garden they find an underground lake under all London which expands to flood the entire world. Leo makes a raft from their living room and as they float they meet the wife of the man who abused Neil.

== Productions ==
Rafts and Dreams was first presented at the Royal Court Theatre in 1990. The production was directed by John Dove and the cast was:

- Neil Bell – Jonathan Cullen
- Hetty – Adie Allen
- Leo – Jason Watkins
- Jo – Natasha Pyne
- Alex – Ilan Ostrove
- Woman – Maureen Hibbert

In 2003 the play was revived at the Royal Exchange, Manchester in a production directed by Tim Stark.

== Critical reception ==
Encore Theatre Magazine described the play as “one of the great post-war British plays.”
