= Alex Waldmann =

English actor

- Born: 1979 (age 46–47); Cambridge, Cambridgeshire, England
- Occupation: Actor
- Years active: 2004–present
- Spouse: Amelia Sears (m. 2009)
- Website: alexwaldmannnews.com

Alex Waldmann (born 1979) is an English actor from London. He is married to director Amelia Sears.

== Television ==
In 2010, Waldmann acted in a 90-minute World War Two docu-drama 'First Light' for Lion Television. He played the role of RAF pilot John Fraser Drummond. 'First Light' was broadcast on BBC2 in September 2010. He then took on the guest lead role of 'Drew' in the Halloween Special of the second series of BBC comedy 'Psychoville'. It was broadcast on the BBC in October 2010. Waldmann also starred in the BBC 2's adaptation of Sarah Waters' best-selling novel, 'The Night Watch', which aired in July 2011. He played Alex Jennings.

In April 2016, Waldmann starred in the Shakespeare Live event, which was screened on BBC 2 to celebrate Shakespeare 400. Here Waldmann was reunited with his As You Like It co-star, Pippa Nixon. Together they performed a scene from As You Like It.

In April 2025, Waldmann featured in episodes two and three of the second series of Andor, playing Lieutenant Krole, a low level Imperial officer carrying out crop audits on Mina-Rau.

== Radio ==
Waldmann has played numerous roles on radio. In 2012 he played John Eustace in The Eustace Diamonds for BBC Radio 4 drama. He starred in the afternoon drama, Julie, in 2014 playing Richard Kemp. Later in 2014 he played Lancelot in The Once and Future King On 17 May 2015, the BBC broadcast the latest of their Shakespeare dramas, Macbeth, with Waldmann in the role of Malcolm.

In August 2015, Waldmann starred in the third episode of the BBC drama Series, The Great Scott, a series narrated by David Tennant. The episode was called, 'The Talisman', and Waldmann played Richard.

In March 2016, the BBC Broadcast Three Sisters and Waldmann played Andrei.

== Early theatre career ==
After completing his training at LAMDA, Waldmann began his career in 2004 playing the role of Leto, in Fishbowl, directed by Paul Higgins, at Theatre 503. Since that time he has played a large number of roles in regional theatre.

A break through came in Waldmann's career when he landed the role of Troilus, in Shakespeare's play Troilus and Cressida, with Cheek by Jowl, at the Barbican in 2008, directed by Declan Donnellan. The play received positive reviews, and went on to tour in Europe after finishing its run in London.

Waldmann's greatest success so far came in 2009 when he played Sebastian in Twelfth Night; a Donmar West End production at the Wyndhams Theatre with, among others, Derek Jacobi, and directed by Michael Grandage. It was for this role that Waldmann received an Ian Charleson Award Commendation.

That same year, Waldmann stayed working with Donmar on his next production, playing the part of Laertes, opposite Jude Law in Shakespeare's Hamlet. During this production Waldmann had the opportunity to display his stage fighting skills during the lengthy sword play with Law. Reviews for the play were excellent, and the play itself gained global attention even before moving to Broadway.

Next, Waldmann went on to play the part of Joe, in Shraddha, by Natasha Langridge, at the Soho Theatre. The play was directed by Artistic Director Lisa Goldman. The synopsis of this play states: "The Games spell eviction for the Romany Gypsies. 17 year-old Pearl Penfold is one of them. As the bulldozers close in, Pearl falls in love with Joe, a boy from the local estate. Can Joe prove himself to Pearl and her family before they are gone forever?"

In early 2010, Waldmann worked with Blake Ritson and Bertie Carvel in Patrick Hamilton's Rope, at the Almeida Theatre in Islington, directed by Roger Michell. He played the role of Charles Granillo, one of two young men who attempt to get away with the perfect motiveless murder. This play was once made into a movie of the same name by Alfred Hitchcock, and was said to be inspired by the real-life murder of 14-year-old Bobby Franks in 1924 by University of Chicago students Nathan Leopold and Richard Loeb.

In the summer of 2010, Waldmann played in 'Speechless' at the Sherman Cymru in Cardiff. Prior to this the show played in Edinburgh.

Prior to this, Waldmann appeared in the role of Jonny in Ryan Craig's 'The Holy Rosenbergs' at the National Theatre.

== Royal Shakespeare Company (2012-13) ==
Since 2012, Waldmann has taken multiple roles with the Royal Shakespeare Company:

- King John in King John (dir Maria Åberg): In 2012, he played the title role in Maria Aberg's production of King John. In a production that centres on a re-interpretation of the role of the Bastard (played by Pippa Nixon), reviews noted that Waldmann is "engaging, clear-sighted and always watchable" with "sufficient charisma to hold his own".
- Catesby in Richard III (dir Roxana Silbert): In Richard III, he made a "quietly effective" and "notable Catesby" played with "dogged, nervy loyalty".
- Nezahualcoyotl in A Soldier in Every Son: He also played crown prince Nezahualcoyotl in a production of A Soldier in Every Son, a joint production between the RSC and the National Theatre Company of Mexico.
- Orlando in As You Like It (dir Maria Åberg): In 2013, Waldmann was re-united with Nixon and Åberg in As You Like It, with Waldmann and Nixon being hailed as "the two most exciting actors in the company today". Reviews noted that "even without his impressive physique, [Waldmann] has a winning way about him with a wonderful engagement with the text and captures the impetuosity and passion of this slighted young noble perfectly" with a performance that is "engagingly nerdy" with an "electrifying" sexual frisson.
- Horatio in Hamlet (dir David Farr): In Hamlet, he played Horatio, an "affable, bespectacled housemaster who wears Scandinavian sweaters" played by "the now consistently worthwhile Alex Waldmann", "putting in yet more fine work for the RSC".
- Bertram in All's Well That End's Well (dir Nancy Meckler): In the summer of 2013, Waldmann played Bertram in All's Well That Ends Well. The production received 5 star reviews from The Telegraph and The Guardian. Charles Spencer writing in The Telegraph said, "Alex Waldman mercilessly lays bare the callow insolence of the hard-drinking, charmlessly laddish Bertram". Michael Billington noted, 'As for Alex Waldmann's Bertram, he is less an irredeemable rotter than the damaged product of a laddish, battle-hungry culture: it is clear he secretly fancies Helena but is seduced even more by the thrill of danger and a world in which the French gentry are "sick for breathing and exploit".'
- Brutus in Julius Caesar (dir Angus Jackson): In 2017, Alex played the role of Brutus in Angus Jackson's Julius Caesar. The play was part of the RSC's Rome Season.

== Recent theatre career ==
- Sam Wanamaker Playhouse opening season:
  - In January 2014, Waldmann was cast as Antonio in The Duchess of Malfi which was the opening production of the new Sam Wanamaker Playhouse. The production was broadcast on the BBC on 25 May 2014.
  - In February and March 2014, Alex played Jasper in The Knight of the Burning Pestle.
- Jonah and Otto at Park Theatre (dir Tim Stark): In 2014, Waldmann played Jonah in Robert Holman's Jonah and Otto at the Park Theatre which was directed by Tim Stark. What's on Stage said "Alex Waldmann captures both the strength and the weakness of Jonah, a troubled 26-year-old trying to be a good father and carting his infant daughter around with him in a trolley. It is a challenging role and Waldmann gets the balance between Jonah's vulnerability and his abrasiveness just right, making him both likeable and, at the same time, repulsive.". The Evening Standard said "Waldmann's Jonah is a beguiling mix of mischief and shyness." Lynn Gardner in The Guardian praised Waldmann's performance stating, "Alex Waldmann is terrific, too, as the angelic and devilish Jonah, capturing the desolation that lurks behind the unnerving facade of alternating charm and aggression."
- Widowers' Houses Orange Tree Theatre (dir Paul Miller): In December 2014, Waldmann starred in the Orange's Tree production of Widowers' Houses Waldmann played the doctor, Harry Trench. Dominic Cavendish commented that "Alex Waldmann exudes bluff, wide-eyed likeability as Harry Trench, the young gentleman who falls for Sartorius's daughter only to (briefly) recoil on learning of this self-made man's insalubrious source of income, but his dawning cynicism needs to come at more evident personal cost." Michael Billington felt that there was "There is lively support from Alex Waldmann as the culpably naive Trench". Paul Taylor in the Independent described Waldmann as "excellent". and Sarah Hemming in The Financial Times felt, "Alex Waldmann's touchingly impulsive Trench blithely flouts convention to the despair of Cokane."
- King John Shakespeare's Globe (dir James Dacre)
- Temple Church, London: Waldmann is now playing the Bastard in the Globe's production of King John. Michael Coveney on What's On Stage comments that he thought. "Waldman, [sic] too, transforms the character's villainy into comic and appealing complexity." Sam Marlow in The Times was also very positive about the production and gave it 4 stars. Marlowe observed that, "Alex Waldmann, as the Bastard, Lionheart's illegitimate son, supplies both swashbuckling swagger and sardonic commentary." The Express gave the production five stars and commenting on Alex's role, said, "The key player here is the common man Faulconbridge, the bastard son of Richard the Lionheart and a kind of proto Bolingbroke, fearless, tribal and a bit of a bruiser with a native intelligence."
- Holy Sepulchre Church, Northampton: Reviews for Waldmann's performance at The Holy Sepulchre, Northampton were very positive from both the local and national Press. There was praise for Alex's performance from the Northampton Herald and Post. "The whole cast is strong with Alex Waldman [sic] as The Bastard witlessly brimming with lionhearted courage particularly eyecatching." The Stage Review gave the production five stars, saying, "Waldmann excels as the hot-headed bastard heir who acts as narrator and rabble-rouser. When not talking to the audience, he blasts John with rhetoric in a hopeless attempt to give the king some backbone." The Stage gave the production five stars saying, "Alex Waldmann excels as the Bastard, but his comic ability and the intimacy of his dialogue to individual members of the audience shows a touch of genius." Lyn Gardner in The Guardian saw Waldmann demonstrating his ability to play future roles. She said, "Alex Waldmann, clearly limbering up for an assault on Richard III – just as many believe Shakespeare was himself doing with this play – is entertaining as the Bastard."
- Shakespeare's Globe:. After playing for four nights at Salisbury Cathedral, King John moved on to play at the Globe until 27 June 2015. The Exeunt Magazine said, '[...] the show belongs to Alex Waldmann as The Bastard [...]', and continues 'Waldmann's smiling unpolished Bastard nevertheless develops a similar easy complicit relationship with the audience.' Time Out said, "Alex Waldmann's charismatic The Bastard works the audience nicely […]."
- Wars of the Roses, Rose Theatre (dir Trevor Nunn): Waldmann played Henry VI in Trevor Nunn's Wars of the Roses which was staged at the Rose Theatre, and finished on 31 October 2015. Waldmann received enormously positive reviews for his portrayal of Henry VI. Henry Hitching writing in The Evening Standard said, "The undoubted star is Alex Waldmann as Henry VI. At first he seems absurdly childlike, fidgety and uncertain. As he develops into a passive and politically limp monarch, Waldmann delicately conveys his mix of fecklessness and saintly idealism, contrasting strikingly with the steely, dominant Joely Richardson as his queen, Margaret of Anjou." Alex Ramon writing in the Reviews Hub was equally full of praise for Waldmann's performance saying, "Alex Waldmann is a sensational King Henry, growing and deepening from innocent youth to a kind of piousness that seems indistinguishable from deep inner strength. Buffeted so much by fortune, his Henry finally seems to be able to accept both victory and defeat with equal equanimity, even, in a startling final moment of forgiveness, tenderly kissing his murderer."
- In the Night Time (Before the Sun Rises) at the Gate Theatre (dir Ben Kidd): Waldmann was cast as the man in The Gate Theatre's In the Night Time (Before the Sun Rises) by Nina Segal The production closed on Saturday 27 February 2016. Waldmann received very positive reviews for his performance. For example, The Stage described the production as "Witty, bold and confrontational debut play which is as smart and funny as it is provocative."
- All My Sons, Rose Theatre (dir Michael Rudman): Alex is starred as Chris Keller in Michael Rudman's production of All My Sons at the Rose Theatre, Kingston-On-Thames.

== Royal Shakespeare Company 2017 ==
Waldmann was cast as Brutus in Julius Caesar for the Royal Shakespeare Company 2017 Roman season. Michael Billington said, "Alex Waldmann portrays Brutus as a troubled neurotic who masks his uncertainty by making a series of wrong-headed decisions: my abiding image is of him sitting alone, after the conspirators have departed, trembling with fear at the task ahead."

== External sources ==
- IMDB.com
