= The Monsters Without =

2021 Filipino film

- Promotional release poster
- Directed by: Randal Kamradt
- Written by: Randal Kamradt
- Produced by: Maria Luna Kamradt
- Starring: Jake Macapagal; Jessica Neistadt; Christina Yr. Jun; Dana Jamison; Andrew Reiley; Leonard Olaer; April Rose Estoy; Nick Medina
- Edited by: Randal Kamradt
- Music by: Benedict Nichols
- Production company: Soliloquy Films
- Distributed by: Indican Pictures
- Release dates: October 1, 2021 (LAAPFF); April 27, 2023 (Philippines)
- Running time: 89 minutes
- Country: Philippines
- Language: English
- Box office: ₱315,617 (US$5,628)

The Monsters Without is a 2021 Filipino science fiction fantasy adventure film written, directed and edited by Randal Kamradt. The film is set in a world where monsters known as Yablo exist, and follows the efforts of P.H.A.S.E., an international team of scientists and soldiers based in the Philippines, to stop an ancient Yablo named Nameless from forcibly sending the other Yablo back to their home dimension.

The Monsters Without had its world premiere at the Los Angeles Asian Pacific Film Festival (LAAPFF) on October 1, 2021. It received a theatrical release in the Philippines on April 27, 2023.

== Cast ==
- Jake Macapagal as Rommel Romero
- Jessica Neistadt as Miranda
- Christina Yr. Jun as Setsuko
- Dana Jamison as April
- Andrew Reiley as Richard
- Leonard Olaer as Benito
- April Rose Estoy as Wonder
- Nick Medina

== Release ==
The Monsters Without premiered at the Los Angeles Asian Pacific Film Festival (LAAPFF) in Los Angeles, California, on October 1, 2021. It screened at the 18th Another Hole in the Head Film Festival in San Francisco, California, in December 2021. It was also shown at the International Vampire Film and Arts Festival in Cardiff, Wales, on June 24, 2022.

The film was released theatrically in the Philippines on April 27, 2023. It screened at the Cinelounge Sunset in Hollywood, California, from April 28 to May 4, 2023. It is slated for release on video-on-demand (VOD) and digital platforms on July 11, 2023.

== Reception ==
=== Accolades ===
Year	Award	Category	Recipient	Result	Ref(s)
2021	18th Another Hole in the Head Film Festival	Best Fantasy Feature	The Monsters Without	Won	
2022	International Vampire Film and Arts Festival	Golden Stake (Feature Film)	The Monsters Without	Nominated	
2022	International Vampire Film and Arts Festival	Silver Stake (Feature Film)	The Monsters Without	Won	
