= Jonah and Otto =

Play by Robert Holman

- Written by: Robert Holman
- Characters: Jonah, Otto
- Genre: Drama
- Setting: Walled garden, South Coast of England

Premiere
- Date premiered: 2008

Jonah and Otto is a play by Robert Holman that was first performed in 2008 and published in the same year.

== Plot ==
Jonah and Otto tells the story of a fleeting moment of connection between an ageing and lonely vicar, Otto, and a young and itinerant magician and father, Jonah. Over the course of twenty-four hours, they experience profound effects as they discuss religion, friendship, God, redemption and magic in the world.

== Productions ==
Jonah and Otto first premiered in 2008 at Manchester's Royal Exchange Theatre, starring Ian McDiarmid and Andrew Sheridan, and directed by Clare Lizzimore.

It had its second production and London premier in 2014 at the Park200 Theatre, directed by Tim Stark and featuring Peter Egan and Alex Waldmann. The creatives also included Simon Bejer (designer), Geraint Pughe (lighting designer), Mark Dunne (sound design), Jack Sain (assistant director), Fiona McCulloch (company manager) and Robert Workman (photography).

== Casts ==
Royal Exchange Theatre:

- Ian McDiarmid as Otto
- Andrew Sheridan as Jonah

Park Theatre:

- Peter Egan as Otto
- Alex Waldmann as Jonah

== Critical reception ==
Lyn Gardner of The Guardian gave the Royal Exchange Theatre production four stars out of five, describing it as: "quietness (that) demands superlative performances, and... gets them: there is something brittle about McDiarmid's bright-eyed Otto, as if he might splinter into a thousand pieces like a cracked vase, and Sheridan is utterly beguiling as Jonah. 'Love,' suggests Otto, 'is paying attention.'" Richard Hall of Artshub described it like: "a good meal... that should be savoured and ideally seen more than once."

Of the Park Theatre production, Paul Taylor of The Independent rewarded four out of five stars, describing it as:

“Robert Holman’s luminously beautiful and uplifting two-hander... in Tim Stark’s cumulatively mesmeric production.”

Lyn Gardner also gave the Park Theater production four stars out of five, writing: "The performances are memorable: Peter Egan’s Otto is like an onion, gradually unpeeling himself – a performance of braided intricacies, unshowy and generous. It feels genuinely lived, as we gradually see this man, literally, stripped bare."

Kate Basset of The Times wrote: “In director Tim Stark’s strongly cast and curiously compelling production... moreover, both performers are transfixing, with Egan being mellifluously mesmeric, and Waldmann edgily dangerous.” Natasha Triney of Time Out wrote: “The writing is crystalline but tender, meaty as well as stark... it is oddly hypnotic and never less than compelling.”
