= Containment (film) =

- Poster
- Directed by: Neil Mcenery-West
- Written by: David Lemon
- Produced by: Christine Hartland; Casey Herbert; Pete Smyth
- Starring: Lee Ross; Sheila Reid; Louise Brealey; Pippa Nixon
- Cinematography: Arthur Mulhern
- Edited by: Arttu Salmi
- Music by: Graham Hadfield
- Production companies: Bandoola Productions; Bright Cold Day Films; Patchwork Productions
- Distributed by: Bill Bravo
- Release date: 1 August 2015
- Running time: 80 minutes
- Country: United Kingdom
- Language: English

Containment is a 2015 British thriller film written by David Lemon, directed by Neil Mcenery-West, produced by Casey Herbert, Pete Smyth and Christine Hartland; and starring Lee Ross, Sheila Reid, Louise Brealey, Pippa Nixon, Andrew Leung, William Postlethwaite and Gabriel Senior. The film's executive producer is Simon Sole.

== Plot ==
The film is set in a 1970s era council block in Weston, Southampton set in the present-day United Kingdom. Mark, an artist, wakes to find that he has been sealed into his Apartment with no way out. There is no electricity, no water and no communications with the outside world apart from a voice over the intercom, repeating the phrase, "please remain calm, the situation is under control". Strange figures in Hazmat suits patrol the grounds outside and set up a military tent. Mark's neighbour, Sergei, breaks down the wall between their Apartments in order to discover why they have been sealed in and try to find a way to escape. Along the way, they team up with their fellow residents, Enid, Sally and Aiden. When young Nicu is taken, Mark and Sergei rescue him and take a Hazmat nurse, Hazel hostage. Sergei pushes her against the window, showing those outside and in the adjacent Apartment that they are holding her hostage. The neighbors interrogate her, and Hazel tells them that an airborne virus that kills within 24 hours is the reason for the quarantine, and infected may be asymptomatic in the initial stages of the illness.

== Cast ==
- Lee Ross as Mark
- Sheila Reid as Enid
- Andrew Leung as Sergei
- Gabriel Senior as Nicu
- Louise Brealey as Sally
- William Postlethwaite as Aiden
- Pippa Nixon as Hazel

== Production ==
Mcenery-West began working on the film in 2008 as he had always been attracted to contained thrillers and wanted to do a modern urban version of something like Lord of the Flies. Mcenery-West's original idea was focussed on the concept of just one character trapped alone in his apartment but Lemon expanded the story to include a diverse group of characters in order to avoid what Lemon felt was "one man on a stage".

The film commenced filming on location in Weston Tower Blocks, Southampton in April 2014. The blocks remained occupied during filming with many of the location's real residents acting as extras in the film. Lemon had a cameo as one of the mysterious figures in a Hazmat suit.

== Release ==
In May 2015, Bill Bravo Films acquired the worldwide rights to the film and the film premiered in July 2015 as part of the East End Film Festival and was previewed at the Henley Fringe Festival ahead of its UK theatrical release in September 2015

== Reception ==
On review aggregator Rotten Tomatoes, which categorises reviews only as positive or negative, the film holds an approval rating of 92% based on 13 critical reviews.

Containment won the Accession Award at the East End Film Festival 2015.

== See also ==
- Containment (TV series)
- Cordon (TV series)
