= Jake Macapagal =

Filipino actor

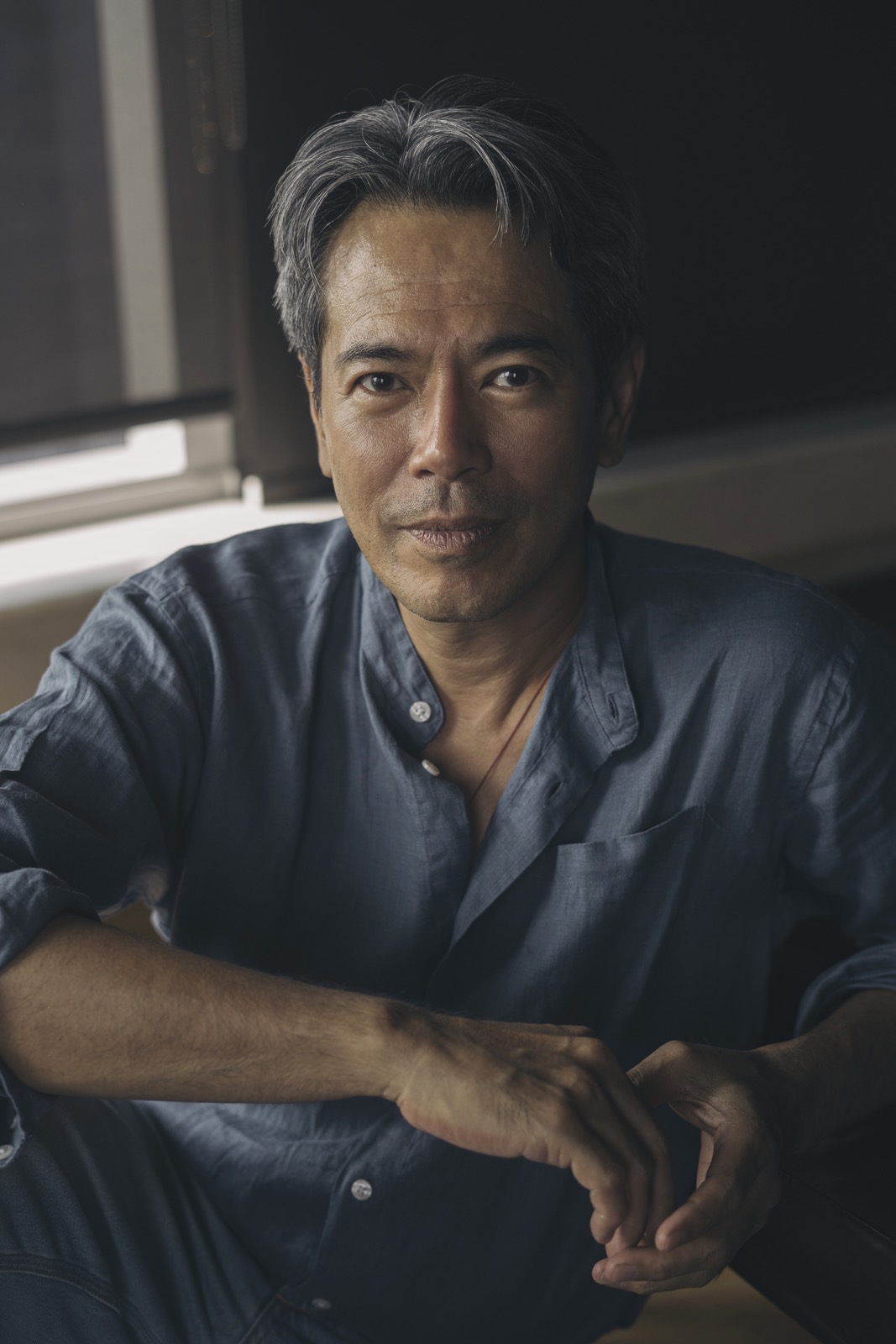
- Born: Romano Macapagal; 1965 or 1966 (age 60–61)
- Occupation: Actor
- Years active: 1993–present
- Known for: No Escape (TV series)

Romano "Jake" Macapagal (born 1965/1966) is a Filipino actor known for his roles in the films Aswang (2011), Metro Manila (2013), Kid Kulafu (2015), Watch List (2019), and The Monsters Without (2021), as well as the HBO Asia television series Halfworlds (2015–) and the Paramount+ television series No Escape.

== Early life ==
Macapagal was born in Manila, Philippines.

At age 16, he booked his first professional acting credit in a live stage production of the classic musical Cats at the Metropolitan Theater of Manila, becoming the cast’s youngest member.

== Career ==
Macapagal credits the 1989 documentary The Heat is On: The Making of ‘Miss Saigon’ as a major career inspiration. The film focused on the making of Miss Saigon, which premiered at Theatre Royal Drury Lane in the West End. In 1994, he auditioned for the musical himself and was cast in the ensemble.

Throughout the 1990s, Macapagal continued to undergo theater-based acting training.

Macapagal's first credited film role was as a “Party Guest” in the 1993 Filipino film Sakay. In the 2000s, he continued his film acting performances in a string of independent Filipino films.

In 2013, Macapagal landed his breakthrough film role as the desperate family man “Oscar” in the British-Filipino co-production Metro Manila, directed by Sean Ellis. Metro Manila was screened at the 2013 Sundance Film Festival, receiving critical acclaim worldwide.

Since appearing in Metro Manila, Macapagal guest-appeared in the 2015 HBO series Halfworlds, the 2019 Filipino crime drama Watch List, and the 2021 horror anthology film Rabid.

In 2023, Macapagal began work for a new upcoming Paramount+ thriller streaming series, No Escape.

Macapagal was also responsible for the casting of his friend, Filipina actress Dolly De Leon, in the 2022 satirical black comedy film Triangle of Sadness.

== Filmography ==
Year	Title	Role
1993	Sakay	Party Guest
2005	Chateau De Roses	Monroe
2006	Compound	Actor
2006	Pandanggo	Healer (segment: “Agogo”)
2007	Foster Child	Actor
2007	Doble Vista (short)	Javier
2007	Sinungaling Na Buwan	Actor
2007	Pi7ong Tagpo	Benjo (segment: “Wedding Ring”)
2007	Mona: Singapore Escort	Singapore Escort
2007	Orange and Lemons: Ang Katulad Mong Walang Katulad (video)	Papa
2007	Sa Pagdapo Ng Mariposa	Javier Vergeire
2008	Frou Frou Ssh, Wag Mong Sabihin Kay Itay (short)	Bhrando
2011	Aswang	Manuel
2012	Shackled	PO2 Santiago
2012	The Caregiver	Javier Vergeire
2013	Metro Manila	Oscar Ramirez
2015	Kid Kulafu	Dizon
2016	Showdown in Manila	Kalalo
2016	Buhay Habangbuhay	Joel
2016	Ave Maria (short)	Emilio
2016	Biyahe	Joel
2017	Sa gabing nanahimik ang mga kuliglig	Actor
2019	Watch List	Lt. Ventura
2021	The Monsters Without	Rommel Romeo
2021	Rabid	Carlo
2025	Quezon	Manuel "Manoling" Nieto

== Television ==
Year	Title	Role
2017	Halfworlds (TV, 8 episodes)	Kaprey
2023	No Escape (TV, 6 episodes)	Colonel Justin Reyes

== Theatre ==
Year	Title	Role	Production company
1981	Peter Pan	Captain Hook	Ateneo Children’s Theater
1982	CATS	Rum Tum Tugger U.S.	Metropolitan Theater
1988	Once On This Island	Daniel	Chase International
1989	Joseph The Dreamer	Judah	Trumpets
1992	Nagraland	Ken	Mitsubishi Music Production Asian Tour
1993	Les Miserables	Feuilly	Repertory Philippines
1993	My Fair Lady	Ensemble	Repertory Philippines
1994	Miss Saigon Germany	Original Cast/ American GI	Stella Musical GmbH
2001	RENT	Angel	Singapore Repertory Theatre, Atlantis Productions
2001	Hedwig and the Angry Itch	Hedwig	Atlantis Productions
2002	Falsettos	Marvin	New Voice Company
2002	Miss Saigon UK National Tour	Viet Cong / US Bar-Owner	Cameron Mackintosh Ltd.
2004	Cabaret	U.S. Emcee	New Voice Company
2005	Aspects of Love	Alex Dillingham	New Voice Company
2007	West Side Story	Bernardo	Stages
2009	Victor/Victoria	King Marchan	Zebra Crossing
2010	A Little Night Music	Count Carl-Magnus	Atlantis Productions
2011	Next to Normal	Dr. Fine/Madden	Atlantis Productions

== Awards and nominations ==
- 2007 Golden Screen Award – Nominee, Breakthrough Performance by an Actor
- 2013 British Independent Film Award – Nominee, Most Promising Newcomer
- 2014 Star Award – Nominee, Movie Actor of the Year
- 2021 FAMAS Award – Nominee, Best Supporting Actor
- 2021 Gawad Urian Awards – Nominee, Best Supporting Actor
- 2021 Pinoy Rebyu Award – Nominee, Best Ensemble Performance

== Personal life ==
Macapagal is openly LGBTQ. He spoke about his lifestyle and preferred decision to reside in Manila in a recent interview with digital LGBTQ magazine OutThere.
