= The Selfish Giant (2013 film) =

2013 film by Clio Barnard

- Theatrical release poster
- Directed by: Clio Barnard
- Written by: Clio Barnard
- Based on: "The Selfish Giant" by Oscar Wilde
- Produced by: Tracy O'Riordan
- Starring: Conner Chapman; Shaun Thomas; Sean Gilder; Lorraine Ashbourne; Ian Burfield; Steve Evets; Siobhan Finneran; Ralph Ineson; Rebecca Manley; Rhys McCoy; Elliott Tittensor
- Cinematography: Mike Eley
- Edited by: Nick Fenton
- Music by: Harry Escott
- Production companies: Moonspun Films; British Film Institute; Film4 Productions
- Distributed by: Artificial Eye
- Release dates: 16 May 2013 (Cannes); 25 October 2013 (United Kingdom)
- Running time: 91 minutes
- Country: United Kingdom
- Language: English
- Budget: £1.4 million
- Box office: $1.1 million

The Selfish Giant is a 2013 British coming-of-age drama film written and directed by Clio Barnard. Inspired by Oscar Wilde's short story of the same name, it stars Conner Chapman and Shaun Thomas as two teenage boys who get caught up in the world of copper theft. Sean Gilder, Lorraine Ashbourne, Ian Burfield, Steve Evets, Siobhan Finneran, Ralph Ineson, Rebecca Manley, Rhys McCoy, and Elliott Tittensor appear in supporting roles. It shows the struggles of Northern England and life, and captures the North and South divide in England

The film had its world premiere at the 66th Cannes Film Festival on 16 May 2013, where it won the Europa Cinemas Label Award. It was theatrically released in the United Kingdom and Ireland on 25 October 2013, by Artificial Eye. It grossed $1.1 million worldwide and received generally positive reviews from critics. It gained seven nominations at the 16th British Independent Film Awards, winning one for Best Technical Achievement (for casting), and was nominated for Outstanding British Film at the 67th British Academy Film Awards.

== Plot ==
Arbor and Swifty are two teenage boys growing up in a poor and run down area of Bradford in West Yorkshire. Arbor suffers from hyperactivity disorder, which often gets him into trouble even when it is not his intention. When the boys are suspended from school after a fight, they decide to earn money collecting and selling scrap metal. They quickly realise that stealing copper from telecom, railway, and power utilities can be lucrative.

They sell their scrap to a local scrap dealer, Kitten, who owns at least two horses and competes in amateur harness racing. Kitten allows Swifty to work with the horse, once he realises Swifty's surprising affection for and natural talent with horses. Kitten also lets the boys rent a horse and a cart to collect scrap metal.

Arbor is envious of Kitten's kindness toward Swifty. Arbor decides to steal pieces of scrap from Kitten and sell them, along with some other scrap, to a dealer in Huddersfield. The plan ends up backfiring; Arbor is refused entrance at the other dealer, and when he makes a deal with some men who offer to sell the scrap for him, they recognise it as stolen and keep the money. Kitten finds out and physically intimidates Arbor into stealing a specific piece of high voltage electric power transmission wire to make up for his loss. The boys are not fully aware of the dangers of high voltage wire. Arbor cuts the wire and Swifty helps to lift it, but is electrocuted and killed.

Arbor is devastated and Kitten is arrested, telling the police he is responsible and allowing Arbor to escape blame. Arbor sits resolutely outside Swifty's mother's house. After several rejections, his own mother finds him and takes him home. He refuses any contact by hiding under his bed, until Swifty's mother finally comes to him.

In a final scene, Arbor takes care of the horse Swifty adored.

== Cast ==
- Conner Chapman as Arbor Fenton
- Shaun Thomas as Swifty
- Sean Gilder as Kitten
- Lorraine Ashbourne as Mary
- Ian Burfield as Mick Brazil
- Steve Evets as 'Price Drop' Swift
- Siobhan Finneran as Mrs. Swift
- Ralph Ineson as Johnny Jones
- Rebecca Manley as Michelle 'Shelly' Fenton
- Rhys McCoy as Daniel
- Elliott Tittensor as Martin Fenton
- Everal A. Walsh as Railway Man
- John Wall as School Nurse
- Mohammed Ali as Mo
- Jamie Michie as Teacher
- Patrick McCann as Neighbour
- Dougie Rooks as Deputy Headteacher
- Reece Andrews as Headteacher
- Paul Chapman as Caretaker
- Robert Emms as Phil the Barman

== Production ==
The Selfish Giant was produced by Tracy O'Riordan for Moonspun Films, and was developed with support from Film4 and the BFI. Film4's Katherine Butler and the BFI's Lizzie Francke served as executive producers.

Principal photography wrapped in October 2012, after six weeks of filming in Bradford, West Yorkshire. The film cost £1.4 million to make, with £3,000 used to create a real hole on contaminated ground.

In a 2013 interview, Clio Barnard said about her second feature film:

I don't want the film to have explicit political content, but it is there. It's essentially a film about love, deep friendship and loyalty between the two boys, but it is played out in an adult world where something has gone fundamentally wrong, and children are often at the cutting edge of that. […] With The Selfish Giant, hopefully you see what gets lost when that ideology of greed is adopted wholesale.

== Release ==
The Selfish Giant premiered in the Directors' Fortnight section of the 66th Cannes Film Festival on 16 May 2013. In the same month, Artificial Eye acquired UK distribution rights to the film and set it for a 15 November 2013 release, while Sundance Selects acquired North American distribution rights. International sales were handled by Protagonist Pictures.

The first trailer was released on 16 September 2013. In the United Kingdom, the film was simultaneously released in theaters and on the BFI Player on 25 October 2013. It opened in the United States on 17 December 2013.

== Awards and reception ==
The Selfish Giant was screened in the Directors' Fortnight section at the 2013 Cannes Film Festival where it won the Europa Cinemas award. It was also nominated for the 2013 Lux Prize. The film was screened in the Contemporary World Cinema section at the 2013 Toronto International Film Festival. It won Best Film at the 24th Stockholm International Film Festival. It was also screened at the UK Film Festival in London, and received the Grand Prix for Best Film at the 40th Film Fest Gent. The film was nominated for Best British Film at the 2014 BAFTAs.

Peter Bradshaw of The Guardian gave the film five out of five stars.
