= On the Shore of the Wide World =

2005 play by Simon Stephens

- Original language: English
- Written by: Simon Stephens
- Subject: Epic play about love, family, Roy Keane and the size of the galaxy.
- Genre: Drama

Premiere
- Date: 18 April 2005
- Place: Royal Exchange Theatre; Manchester, England

On the Shore of the Wide World is a play by the English playwright Simon Stephens. It opened 18 April 2005, at the Royal Exchange Theatre, Manchester, under the direction of Sarah Frankcom. On May 26, the production transferred to the Cottesloe space of the Royal National Theatre in London.

The play focuses on three generations of the Holmes family in Stockport, England, examining the persistent dreams and struggles facing each generation. The play takes its title from the poem When I have Fears that I may Cease to Be by John Keats.

== Characters ==
Alice Holmes	Siobhan Finneran
Peter Holmes	Nicholas Gleaves
Charlie Holmes	David Hargreaves
Susan Reynolds	Susannah Harker
Sarah Black	Carla Henry
John Robinson	Roger Morlidge
Alex Holmes	Thomas Morrison
Ellen Holmes	Eileen O'Brien
Paul Danzinger	Matt Smith
Christopher Holmes	Steven Webb

== Awards and nominations ==
- 2006 Laurence Olivier Award for Best New Play
