= Shaun Thomas =

British actor (born 1997)

- Born: Shaun Thomas; 30 May 1997 (age 29); Bradford, West Yorkshire, United Kingdom
- Occupation: Actor
- Years active: 2013–present

Shaun Thomas (born 30 May 1997) is an English actor, best known for his roles as Swifty in the film The Selfish Giant (2013) and Ser Raymun Fossoway in the series A Knight of the Seven Kingdoms (2026).

== Early life ==
Thomas was born on 30 May 1997 in Bradford, West Yorkshire, England.

== Career and awards ==
Thomas's first professional experience in front of the camera was in Clio Barnard's sophomore feature film, The Selfish Giant (2013)—which won the Europa Cinemas Award at Cannes Film Festival, among other accolades. Thomas received rave reviews, jointly earning himself and co-lead Conner Chapman the Best British Newcomer(s) Award at the BFI London Film Festival. He was also nominated for Breakthrough Performance (shared with Chapman) at the British Independent Film Awards and Young British/Irish Performer of the Year at the London Film Critics' Circle Awards (losing to Chapman).

In addition, he won the British Independent Film Award for Best Supporting Performance—for playing Badger in Molly Manning Walker's How to Have Sex (2023)—in a tie with Paul Mescal for All of Us Strangers (2023). Other film credits include Miss Peregrine's Home for Peculiar Children (2016) and Ali & Ava (2021).

On television, his most notable roles were "Craggy" on the coming-of-age comedy biopic series Ladhood (2019–2022); and Gerry Roberts on the British soap Emmerdale (2017–2018). He also starred in several miniseries, including Four Lives (2022) and The Long Shadow (2023). Recently, he landed a supporting role as Ser Raymund 'The Reluctant' Fossoway on the Game of Thrones (2011–2019) prequel series, A Knight of the Seven Kingdoms (2026).

== Filmography ==
=== Film ===
Year	Title	Role	Notes	Ref.
2013	The Selfish Giant	Swifty	film debut	
2016	Grimsby	Skeletor		
2016	Bring Back the Cat	Auberon Ellison	short film	
2016	Miss Peregrine's Home for Peculiar Children	Dylan		
2021	Ali & Ava	Callum		
2023	How to Have Sex	Badger		
2025	The Choral	Mitch (bass in the choral)		
2025	Rocket Fuel	Wes	short film	

=== Television ===
Year	Title	Role	Notes	Ref.
2016	WPC 56	Albert Chapman	Episode #2.5: "The Harder They Fall"	
2017–2018	Emmerdale	Gerry Roberts	Recurring role — 93 episodes (soap opera)	
2019–2022	Ladhood	Thomas "Craggy" Cragg	Main role — 18 episodes (3 seasons)	
2021	Casualty	Bruno Wilding	Episode: #35.11	
2022	Four Lives	Paul	Main role — 3 episodes (miniseries)	
2023	The Long Shadow	Neil Jackson	Recurring role — 4 episodes (miniseries)	
2026	A Knight of the Seven Kingdoms	Ser Raymun Fossoway	Recurring role — 5 episodes	

== Awards and nominations ==
Thomas won Best Supporting Performance at the British Independent Film Awards 2023 for his role as Badger in How to Have Sex.
