= Charlotte Eaton (actress) =

British television and stage actress

- Born: 14 May 1972 (age 54); Ealing, London, United Kingdom
- Occupations: Television actress; Stage actress
- Years active: 1998–present
- Agent: James Foster Ltd
- Known for: Benidorm (2015); Witless (2016–2017)

Charlotte Eaton (born 14 May 1972) is a British television and stage actress. She is most known for her portrayal of Terri Dawson in the British sitcom Benidorm.

== Early life ==
Charlotte Eaton trained at The Court Theatre Training Company for two years from 1995.

== Career ==
Charlotte Eaton is most widely known for her role as Terri Dawson in ITV series Benidorm but has previously had roles in Bad Girls, Doctor Who, Gambit, Doctors, Mrs Biggs and Call the Midwife.

In 2015, Eaton joined the cast of Benidorm as Terri Dawson, the sister of already established character Clive Dyke (Perry Benson).

Eaton is also known for playing Jackie in two series of Witless.
