= Siobhan Finneran =

British actress (born 1966)

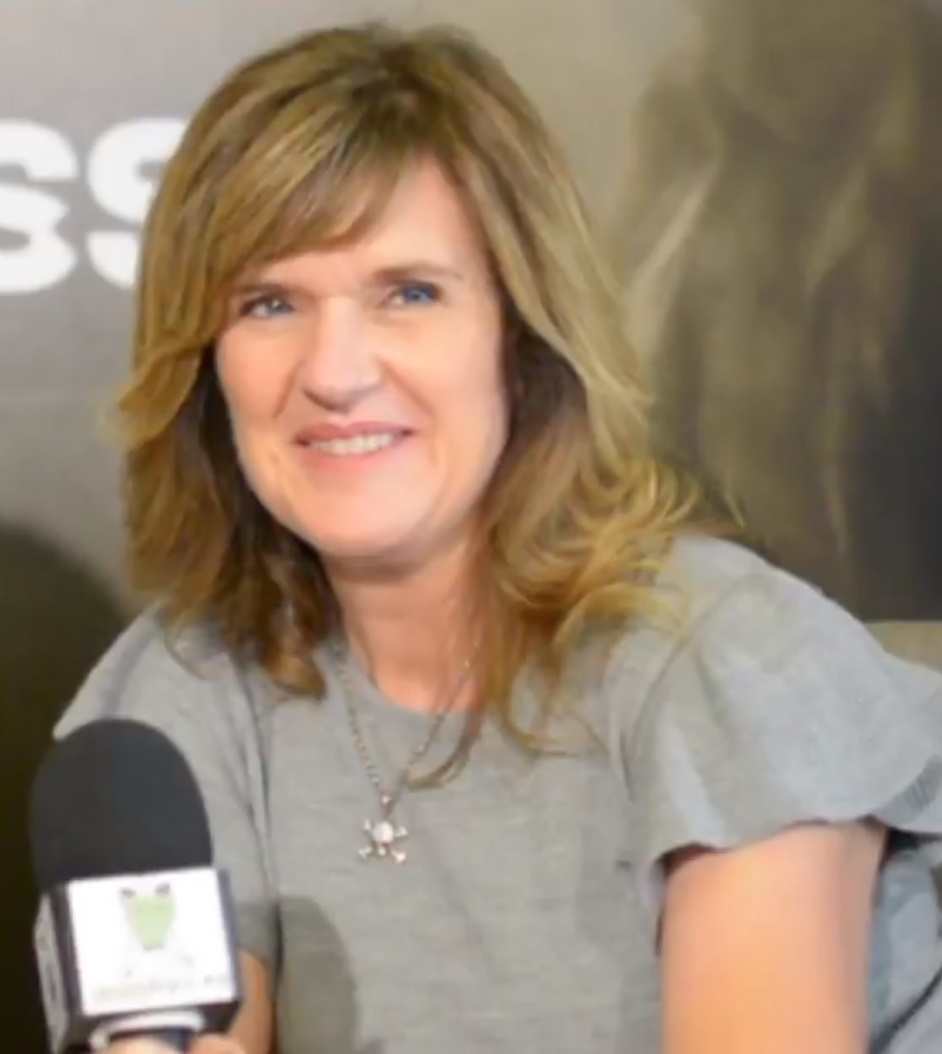
- Finneran in 2017
- Born: Siobhan Margaret Finneran; 27 April 1966 (age 60); Oldham, Lancashire, England
- Occupation: Actress
- Years active: 1986–present
- Works: Full list
- Spouse: Mark Jordon (m. 1997; div. 2014)
- Children: 2

Siobhan Margaret Finneran (born 27 April 1966) is a British actress. She made her screen debut in the independent film Rita, Sue and Bob Too (1987) and subsequently worked consistently in television drama including roles in Coronation Street (1989–1990), Emmerdale (1998), Clocking Off (2000–2002), and The Amazing Mrs Pritchard (2006). In 2005, Finneran originated the lead female role in the stage play On the Shore of the Wide World and was awarded the Manchester Evening News Theatre Award for Best Actress in a Leading Role. Also a comedy performer, she appeared as Janice Garvey, a leading character in the first seven series of the ITV sitcom Benidorm (2007–2015).

Later television roles include the mini-series Unforgiven (2009), the first three series of the costume drama Downton Abbey (2010–2012), Happy Valley (2014–2023), for which she was nominated for the 2017 British Academy Television Award for Best Supporting Actress, Cold Feet (2017–2019), and Time (2021–2026). In 2025, she portrayed the lead role of DI Liz Nyles in the ITV crime drama Protection. Later film credits include Mrs Swift in the 2013 film release The Selfish Giant, which earned her a British Independent Film Award nomination. Finneran is also a prolific television documentary narrator.

== Early life and education ==
Siobhan Margaret Finneran was born in Oldham, Lancashire to Irish parents. She moved with her family to Saddleworth as a young child, and has lived in the area ever since. During childhood Finneran was always drawn to the performing arts and was a fan of the celebrated English comedian Eric Morecambe, recalling that "as a little girl I wanted to be Eric Morecambe. Not to be like him but to actually be him". She completed a theatre studies course.

== Career ==
=== 1987–2006 ===
Finneran was cast in her first major role, as Rita in the 1987 film Rita, Sue and Bob Too. Kate Muir, chief film critic at UK newspaper The Times, described the characters of Rita and Sue—two teenagers who both have a sexual affair with the older, married Bob (George Costigan)—"as raunchy, cheeky, unstoppable schoolgirls played with relish by Siobhan Finneran and Michelle Holmes. At its UK Premiere at the Cinecity Brighton Film Festival, journalists were critical about the film's themes. Finneran, the youngest person there, challenged the critics who had enjoyed Wish You Were Here the previous night. She said it seemed the portrayal of underage sex in the 1950s was OK, "but because this is happening now, in 1987, it gives you the high ground to act like the bloody Vatican".

Between August 1989 and March 1990, Finneran appeared as factory employee Josie Phillips, in the long running ITV1 soap opera Coronation Street. The character of Josie is best remembered for her on-off employment, and difficult relationship, with her boss, Mike Baldwin.

Finneran continued to appear regularly on UK television, making guest appearances in numerous drama series including Heartbeat (1993, 1994, 2003), Peak Practice (1995), Out of the Blue (1996), Where The Heart Is (1997), Hetty Wainthrop Investigates (1998), Emmerdale as Heather Hutchinson (1998) and The Cops (1999). Finneran also established herself in comedic roles including episodes of Josie (a 1991 comedy series starring Josie Lawrence), Cannon and Ball's Playhouse (1991) and as a regularly appearing cast member in ITV1's production of The Russ Abbot Show (1995–1996). Whilst having performed frequently in comedy, Finneran credits her performance as "a very damaged mother" in Out of the Blue in 1996 in triggering a shift towards more dramatic roles.

Between 2000 and 2002, Finneran appeared as Julie O'Neill in three series of the BBC One drama series Clocking Off. Subsequent roles in the early 21st century include the ITV1 Russell T Davies drama series Bob & Rose (2001), Sparkhouse (2002) – a modern re-telling of Wuthering Heights scripted by Sally Wainwright – and the two-part thriller Passer By (2004) starring James Nesbitt. In 2005, Finneran appeared as the female lead, Alice Holmes, in the original stage production of On the Shore of the Wide World at the Royal Exchange, Manchester. Finneran's performance earned her the Manchester Evening News Theatre Award for Best Actress in a Leading Role. In 2006, Finneran was cast as a series regular in The Amazing Mrs Pritchard (2006). Her character, Beverley Clarke, is an established partner in a law firm who is inspired to launch a career in politics by her experience of the titular Ros Pritchard, and ultimately becomes an MP.

=== 2007–2012 ===
In 2007, Finneran appeared as Kelly in the British Independent film Boy A. Also, in 2007, Finneran appeared as part of the original regular cast in the British sitcom Benidorm which details the experiences of holidaymakers and employees at the fictional Solana hotel in Benidorm, Spain. Finneran described her character Janice Garvey as "feisty, foul-mouthed and quite fantastic". Over the course of the series, Janice struggles to keep her family unit—comprising Janice's mother Madge (Sheila Reid), her husband Mick (Steve Pemberton) and their own children and grandchild—under control. A television correspondent at the Sunday Mirror described the character as a "fiercely protective lioness, humorous, straight-talking, and saucy" inclined to "let-it-all-hang-out" with a wardrobe comprising "skimpy, mutton-dressed-as-lamb outfits". Finneran found elements of the shoot embarrassing—including the requirement to be filmed in swimwear— and one scene which involved her character "snogging" a young barman played by an actor in his early twenties. In spite of the outlandish elements of the sitcom, Finneran notes that the cast "tried to find the truth in each character, to make them a real person – not a stereotype." In 2008, Finneran explained that as the series was filmed on location in Benidorm, her parents stepped in to help with childcare back home, with the children visiting during half-term.

Finneran would ultimately remain with the series, through to its 7th series, which aired in 2015. Discussing the enduring appeal of the series in 2013, Finneran stated that the series' fan base had become firmly established by the fourth series and that viewers were attracted to the "banter" and recognisable family dynamics that take viewers "to the extremes". She also felt that the contrasting summer setting and typical winter air date also provided a form of escapism for the UK audience. After discussing their intent to leave Benidorm during filming of the sixth series (2014), Pemberton and Finneran announced their joint departures ahead of the 7th series (2015). Both actors wanted to spend less time filming abroad, and neither wanted to leave on their own. Finneran found filming her last scenes "heartbreaking" noting she was in "a terrible state" upon bidding farewell to co-stars and crew with whom she had forged a close relationship.

Alongside her role in Benidorm, Finneran continued to star in original drama series. In 2008, she portrayed Sister Ruth, a Vatican nun drawn to investigate a priest who performs exorcisms, in five episodes of the supernatural thriller Apparitions. In 2009, Finneran appeared as a main cast member in the three part ITV1 thriller Unforgiven as Izzie Ingram, a family lawyer who aids convicted murder Ruth Slater (Suranne Jones) track down her long lost sister. George Costigan, who appears in Unforgiven and first worked with Finneran in 1987 cited the mini-series as an illustration of Finneran's versatility, and justification of his appraisal of her as an acting "hero" and personal inspiration, stating that "she has no background in it and she just goes there. It's extraordinary. Those are the actors that electrify you." Also in 2009, Finneran appeared in episodes of The Street, and Blue Murder, and the straight-to-DVD soap opera spin-off Coronation Street: Romanian Holiday.

"She's worked since she was probably 14 or 15 years old, and has basically sacrificed her entire life to somebody else, for the good of their life and their home—it's no wonder that she would get frustrated or angry about things." "

— Siobhan Finneran on her Downton Abbey character.

In 2010, it was announced that Finneran had been cast in Downton Abbey, a period drama depicting the lives of the aristocratic Crawley family and their domestic servants. Upon its transmission, Downton Abbey received extensive critical acclaim, and strong viewing figures in both the UK and America. Finneran's character, lady's maid Sarah O'Brien, serves as an archetypal villain in the series' narrative, whose schemes affect both her employers and her colleagues. The role was Finneran's first in a costume drama. To become O'Brien, Finneran was required to wear "frumpy black" servants’ attire, a wig—which Finneran described as having "poodle curls" and "one bit [that is] proper bouffant"—and spend around an hour in make-up each day to look less attractive. Though screenwriter Julian Fellowes did not give her a backstory to work with, Finneran imagined that O'Brien was both traumatised by past experiences and had accumulated anger, frustration and resentment issues from having worked in service all her life. In 2012, Finneran stated that she enjoyed the response to the character noting that viewers "love that she's a nasty piece of work" and "love to dislike her".

During her time on the show, the Downton Abbey cast won the Screen Actors Guild Award for Outstanding Performance by an Ensemble in a Drama Series in 2012 (for series 2), and were nominated also in 2013 (for series 3). Finneran announced her departure in March 2013, ahead of the fourth series, explaining that she had been signed for only three series and did not wish to extend her contract, adding: "When I stop loving something, I stop doing it." Later that year, when asked by the Radio Times how her character's abrupt exit would be handled, Finneran retorted: "I'm hoping she's flung off the roof of the Abbey".

=== 2013–2016 ===
In 2013, Finneran starred in the second series of The Syndicate on BBC One, portraying Mandy, a hospital worker and domestic abuse victim who wins the national lottery with her colleagues. Finneran was attracted to the role because of the suspense of her character's storyline, and the challenge of keeping the abuse scenes as true-to-life as possible. Also in 2013, Finneran portrayed Mrs Swift in The Selfish Giant an independent film inspired by both Oscar Wilde's short story of the same name and screenwriter and director Clio Barnard's personal experiences of the socially fragmented northern English underclass. Finneran's character is a troubled yet loving mother, who she describes as "not quite the full shilling". In spite of the tough subject matter of the film Finneran enjoyed the filming process noting that she felt "safe and secure" in the hands of Barnard, who she felt to be a calmer director than any other she had worked with. For her portrayal, Finneran was nominated for the 2013 British Independent Film Award for Best Supporting Actress. In 2014, Finneran appeared in the French-Language film Un Illustre Inconnu (Nobody from Nowhere).

Also in 2014, Finneran portrayed recovering heroin addict Clare in BBC One's Happy Valley—a crime drama that centres on the personal and occupational struggles faced by Clare's cohabitant sister, sergeant Catherine Cawood (Sarah Lancashire)—to general acclaim. Whilst eulogising the series' feminist credentials Gerald O'Donovan of The Daily Telegraph praised Finneran's "quietly compelling performance" and the character's "gritty wisdom" and stated viewers were unlikely to witness "a more believably crafted female character" that year. A second series aired in 2016, which gave more focus to Clare's backstory, interpersonal relationships and struggles with alcoholism. Reviewing an episode of the second series, Jack Seale of The Guardian described Finneran as "brilliant" in her depiction of both Clare's "jittery vulnerability" and portrayal of "a snarling addict who has relapsed". In spite of the series' subject matter, Finneran claimed that as an inept cook, she found having to peel carrots and act simultaneously the hardest part of filming.

By the time of Happy Valley's second series, Finneran had known Lancashire for over 30 years. Both their on-screen partnership and the depiction of middle-aged women in general in Happy Valley have been lauded as two of the series' most distinctive elements by television journalists and critics. Reflecting on the series' popularity, Finneran stated she felt viewers had taken the show to their hearts because the cast "reflected them" and "looked like real human beings with authentic emotions and flaws". Radio Times reviewer Alison Graham stated in 2016 that Finneran and Lancashire "should share every acting award going". Happy Valley won the British Academy Television Award for Best Drama Series in Both 2015 and 2017. Finneran was nominated in the Best Supporting Actress category in 2017. Though correctly predicting that she would not win the award, Ben Lawrence of The Daily Telegraph identified her as who he felt to be the deserving winner praising the "subtle, unfurling power" of her depiction.

Between December 2014 and February 2015, Finneran appeared in the stage drama 3 Winters at the Royal National Theatre in London. In Autumn 2015, Finneran played a supporting role in the three part supernatural drama serial Midwinter of the Spirit.

=== 2017–present ===
In 2017, she portrayed real-life Detective Constable Christine Freeman in two-part drama The Moorside, a depiction of the 2008 disappearance of Shannon Matthews told from the perspective of the local community. Upon reading the script, Finneran felt that The Moorside told a necessary story that illuminated truths that had been distorted by media coverage.

Finneran's next television role in 2017 was as Detective Chief Inspector Lauren Quigley, one of the protagonists in six-part ITV drama The Loch, a crime mystery set on the banks of Loch Ness in the Scottish Highlands. Quigley is an ambitious English career detective drafted in to investigate a serial killer and acts as a foil to the other protagonist, working mother and local woman DC Annie Redford (Laura Fraser). Finneran was keen to star in the series after reading the first three scripts and finding both her character and the small community setting intriguing, in addition to the prospect of working with a former Downton Abbey director (Brian Kelly) and Laura Fraser, whose acting she had long admired. Finneran based herself in Glasgow during the filming shoot and enjoyed "the buzz, the architecture, the social life", describing the city as "one of my favourite places to ever work".

In 2017, she played Nikki Kirkbright in ITV's Cold Feet, and Marilyn in The Other One pilot.

In 2018, Finneran played Becka Savage in the Doctor Who episode "The Witchfinders".

In 2019, Finneran played Sally Newell in The Widow episode "Poteza". In the same year, she also played Elaine Pickford in A Confession, a TV dramatisation of a true story about the murder of two young women in England and the unusual events resulting from the capture of their killer.

In 2020, Finneran reprised her role as Marilyn in the comedy series The Other One, played Detective Sergeant Johanna Griffin in Netflix original mystery thriller The Stranger, and narrated the ITV documentary series Inside Britain's Food Factories.

2020 also saw Finneran playing the unstable mother of the title character in writer and star Sophie Willan's comedy pilot Alma's Not Normal. A full 6-episode series was subsequently picked up and aired in 2021, with a second series which premiered on 7 October 2024.

In 2023, Finneran reprised her role as Clare in the third and final series of Happy Valley that aired on BBC One & BBC iPlayer in the UK. She also played Beryl in The Reckoning, a mini-series about the life of Jimmy Savile. Towards the end of the year, Finneran starred as Marie-Louise Dell, a prison chaplain, in the second series of Time, alongside Jodie Whittaker, Tamara Lawrance and Bella Ramsey. On the role, Finneran told Radio Times: "I've just felt very privileged and very honoured to be part of this cast, although you can't say you've enjoyed the filming process because the content is really quite dense and brutal. For me, being able to sit and watch the performances has been really quite breath-taking and brilliant."

In May 2024, Finneran appeared in the first episode of the final series of Inside No. 9.

She plays the lead role as DI Liz Nyles in the ITV crime drama Protection.

== Personal life ==
From the late 1990s, Finneran began to consciously cut back her acting work to raise her two children with her husband, the actor Mark Jordon. They married in August 1997 and divorced in 2014. Finneran has been in a relationship with actor Don Gilet since 2018.

In 2023, Finneran became patron for Manchester-based charity Contact Hostel, an organisation that provides support and accommodation for teenage girls facing homelessness.

== Awards and nominations ==
| Year | Award Ceremony | Nominated work | Category | Result |
|---|---|---|---|---|
| 2005 | Manchester Evening News Theatre Awards | On the Shore of the Wide World | Best Actress in a Leading Role | Won |
| 2012 | Screen Actors Guild Awards | Downton Abbey | Outstanding Performance by an Ensemble in a Drama Series | Won |
| 2013 | Screen Actors Guild Awards | Downton Abbey | Outstanding Performance by an Ensemble in a Drama Series | Nominated |
| 2013 | British Independent Film Awards | The Selfish Giant | Best Supporting Actress | Nominated |
| 2017 | British Academy Television Awards | Happy Valley | Best Supporting Actress | Nominated |
| 2024 | British Academy Television Awards | Happy Valley | Best Supporting Actress | Nominated |
