= Sheila Reid =

Scottish actress (born 1937)

- Born: 21 December 1937 (age 88); Glasgow, Scotland
- Years active: 1960–present
- Notable work: Benidorm (2007–2016)
- Spouses: Julian Curry (m. 1967, d. 1999) Terry Bullen (m. 2008)

Sheila Reid (born 21 December 1937) is a Scottish actress. An original member of the Royal National Theatre in 1963, she played Bianca in the National's 1965 film version of Othello, with Laurence Olivier in the title role. Her other film appearances include Brazil (1985), The Winter Guest (1997) and Containment (2015). In her later career, she is known for playing Madge Harvey in the ITV sitcom Benidorm (2007–2016).

== Education ==
Born in Glasgow, Reid grew up in Bridge of Weir, Scotland, before her father's army career took the family to India. She was then educated at Moreton Hall School, a boarding independent school for girls, near the market town of Oswestry in Shropshire. Reid returned to the school to read 'The Four Quartets' by T. S. Eliot, at the Old Moretonian Grand Centenary Reunion celebration in 2014.

== Career ==
Reid has had a long and distinguished career in theatre, film and television. She worked with Laurence Olivier, at The Royal National Theatre in London, and with Ingmar Bergman and Elliott Gould.

=== Film and television ===
==== 1960s ====
During the 1960s, Reid appeared in Armchair Theatre, Tales of Mystery, Z-Cars, Love Story, Knock on Any Door, and Theatre 625.

She took on the role of Antoinette Plucheux in the BBC's television film adaptation of the 1907 French stage play A Flea in Her Ear.

==== 1970s ====
in 1970, she appeared as Maria in the episode 'Twelfth Night' of ITV drama anthology series ITV Sunday Night Theatre.

On 14 July 1971, she starred in the Ingmar Bergman directed film The Touch. On 29 September 1971, she appeared in BBC One's drama series Owen, M.D. as Mrs. Shackles in the episode "The Whole Hog, Part 1". She returned to the role as Mrs. Shackles once more in the episode "The Whole Hog, Part 2" which aired on 30 September 1971. In 1973, Reid returned to the series for three more episodes, this time as a different character, Mabel Simpson, in the episodes "Water Under the Bridge" (22 April 1973), "The Love Game" (3 June 1973) and "Father of the Man" (6 May 1973).

In 1972, she appeared in BBC Two's drama anthology series Thirty-Minute Theatre as Mrs. Berry in the episode "And for My Next Trick". On 2 March 1973, she appeared in ITV drama series Justice as Madge in the episode "The Whole Truth?". On 22 May 1975, she appeared in BBC One's drama anthology series Play for Today as Vanessa Bagley in the episode "Brassneck". On 29 December 1975, she appeared in BBC One's drama series Play of the Month as Lottie Grady in the episode "When We Are Married".

In 1976, she appeared in Australian miniseries The Emigrants as May Parker in the episode "Chances for the Children". She returned to the role of May Parker twice more in the episode "Endeavour" which aired on 16 November 1976 and "13,000 Miles Away" which aired on 23 November 1976.

In 1978, she appeared in BBC One's comedy drama series All Creatures Great and Small as Mrs. Donovan in the episode "Practice Makes Perfect". She returned to the role of Mrs. Donovan once more in the episode 'Spring Fever' (1990).

On 22 October 1978, she appeared in the ITV drama series Lillie as Queen Victoria in the episode "Bertie". On 14 December 1978, she appeared in the ITV police drama The Sweeney as Doreen Haskins in the episode "Victims".

==== 1980s ====
In 1980, she starred as Lady Rawlinson in Sir Henry at Rawlinson End. In 1981, she appeared in the ITV comedy drama series Get Lost! as Miss Langley in the episode "Worried About Jim". She returned to the role as Miss Langley in three more episodes, "The Vicar Did It" (19 June 1981), "Kiss Me Quick" (26 June 1981) and "Not a Proper Ending" (3 July 1981). In 1982, she appeared in BBC One's drama series Fame Is the Spur as Mrs. Ryerson. She returned to the role of Mrs. Ryerson in three more episodes in 1982.

In 1983, she appeared in ITV comedy drama series Auf Wiedersehen, Pet as Patsy Busbridge in the episode 'Home Thoughts from Abroad'. In 1984, she appeared in ITV drama series Miracles Take Longer as Mrs. Hook. In 1985, she appeared as Etta in the two part Sixth Doctor story "Vengeance on Varos" in BBC One's science fiction drama Doctor Who.

==== 1990s ====
On 20 April 1993, she starred as Jessie Fraser in the episode 'Gingerbread' in ITV's drama series Taggart.

On 10 March 1995, she appeared as Tilda MacLean in the episode 'No Time for Heroes' in the ITV drama series Doctor Finlay.

On 9 July 1995, she appeared in BBC One's five part drama series Oliver's Travels as Eileen in the episode "Do We Look Like That?". On 21 June 1998, she appeared as Edith Woodford in the ITV family drama Where the Heart Is.

On 30 October 1998, she starred as Mrs. Baggott in the film Still Crazy.

On 7 December 1999, she appeared in ITV police procedural drama The Bill, as Claire in the episode "Consumers". She returned to the role of Claire once more in the episode "Lock In" (9 December 1999). She returned to the series many years later, this time as a different character, Audrey Thorp, in one more episode "431" (3 August 2006).

==== 2000–present ====
On 2 October 2001, she appeared in BBC One's medical soap opera Doctors as Louise Kingston in the episode "Retiring the Past". She returned to the series on four more occasions, each time playing a different character. She played Ivy Brownlow in the episode "You People" (20 January 2009), Eena McFee in the episode "Seize the Day" (31 May 2011) and Sid Dalmond in the episode "Sid's Blues" (22 January 2014). On 17 April 2020, Reid appeared as 'Speedy Sue', a con artist.

On 15 September 2002, she appeared in BBC One's comedy drama series Monarch of the Glen as Reverend Alice in the episode 'Episode #4.3'. On 17 January 2003, she appeared as Mrs. Metcalfe in the episode 'Painted in Blood' in ITV crime drama series Midsomer Murders.

On 17 September 2005, she appeared in BBC One's medical drama series Casualty as Cynthia Hollis in the episode "Deep Water". She returned to the series on three more occasions, each time playing a different character. She played Loretta Parks in the episode "Into the Fog" (2 October 2010), Gwen Morgan in the episode 'Return to Sender' (25 October 2014) and Sheila Bobbins in the episode 'Schoolboy Crush' (24 September 2016).

On 18 January 2006, she appeared in BBC One's drama anthology series The Afternoon Play as Edith in the episode "Your Mother Should Know". On 28 January 2006, she appeared in BBC One's paranormal mystery drama Sea of Souls as Aggie the Chambermaid in the episode "The Newsroom".

In late 2006, Reid was cast as loud-mouth Madge Harvey in the ITV sitcom Benidorm. Her character first appeared on 1 February 2007 in the first episode alongside her new on-screen family, The Garveys. It was announced on 8 January 2015 that Madge and The Garveys were leaving the show after nearly 8 years. They departed on the second episode of Series 7 (9 January 2015). On 17 April 2015, ITV confirmed Reid's return to the series and that she would appear in the third episode of Series 8. On 25 January 2016, Reid reprised her role as Madge for one episode.

On 13 November 2009, she appeared in BBC One's dark mystery series Psychoville as Old Crone in the seventh episode.

On 21 June 2012, she appeared in Sky Arts sketch show/comedy drama Psychobitches as Mother Teresa in the episode "Pilot". She returned to the series on three more occasions, each time playing a different character. She played Margot Fonteyn in the episode "Episode #1.1' (2013), Betty Ford in the episode "Episode #1.5" (2013) and Shirley Temple in the episode "Episode #2.6" (2014).

On 25 December 2012, she appeared in BBC One's period drama Call the Midwife as Mrs. Jenkins in the Christmas Special episode, the first episode of Series 2. On 13 February 2013, she appeared in BBC One's sitcom Bob Servant Independent as Margo Servant in the episode "The Media". On 25 December 2013, she returned to Doctor Who, this time playing Clara Oswald's Grandmother in the Eleventh Doctor episode "The Time of the Doctor".

On 6 May 2014, she appeared in BBC One's drama anthology series Comedy Playhouse as Lady Cairnsworth in the episode "Miller's Mountain". On 1 November 2014, she reprised her role of Clara's Grandmother in the Twelfth Doctor episode "Dark Water". She was simply credited as 'Gran' in the end credits to both episodes.

=== Roles in theatre ===
==== 1960s ====
In 1963, she starred as Fio Bates in Half a Sixpence at the Cambridge Theatre in London.

==== 1990s ====
In 1993, she starred as Beggar Woman in the London revival of Sweeney Todd at the Royal National Theatre. In 1996, she starred as Celestine in Martin Guerre: The Musical at the Prince Edward Theatre in London. In 1998, she starred as Jack's Mother in Into the Woods at the Donmar Warehouse in London.

==== 2010–present ====
In 2015 she played Mrs. Fiedke in the National Theatre of Scotland's production of Laurie Sansom's adaptation of Muriel Spark's novella, The Driver's Seat.

In 2017, she starred as Gloria in Silver Lining, a new sitcom written by Sandi Toksvig, at the Rose Theatre, Kingston.

== Personal life ==
Reid was formerly married to actor Julian Curry. On 11 April 2008, after 32 years together, she and partner Terry Bullen were married in London, at a private ceremony watched by 12 close friends.

She is involved with charity Plan International.

== Filmography ==
=== Film ===
Year	Title	Role	Notes
1965	Othello	Bianca	
1965	The Alphabet Murders	Mrs. Fortune	
1967	A Flea in Her Ear	Antoinette Plucheux	
1970	Three Sisters	Natasha	
1971	The Touch	Sara Kovac	
1972	I Want What I Want	June	
1972	Z.P.G.	Mary Herrick	
1980	Sir Henry at Rawlinson End	Lady Florrie Rawlinson	
1982	Five Days One Summer	Gillian Pierce	
1982	The Black Room	Female Lover	
1983	The Dresser	Lydia Gibson	
1985	Brazil	Mrs. Buttle	
1987	The Lonely Passion of Judith Hearne	Miss Friel	
1990	Vroom	Jake's Mother	
1991	American Friends	Mrs. Weeks	
1995	Cruel Train	Vera Mussell	
1997	The Winter Guest	Lily	
1997	The Man Who Knew Too Little	Woman in SS Cap	
1998	Still Crazy	Mrs. Baggot	
1999	Felicia's Journey	Iris	
2002	Mrs Caldicot's Cabbage War	Joyce	
2004	A Christmas Carol: The Musical	Mrs. Mops	
2007	A Room with a View	Miss Alan	
2008	Hush	Mrs. Coates	
2015	Containment	Enid	
2015	The Bad Education Movie	Margot	
2016	Halcyon Heights	Grandma	
2020	The Man in the Hat	The Old Woman	
2023	Love Without Walls	Jeanie Binks	
2024	Portraits of Dangerous Women	Nancy	

=== Television ===
Year	Title	Role	Notes
1960	Inside Story	Jean	Episode: "Fifteen Years Solitary"
1960	Armchair Theatre	Assistant Librarian	Episode: "Mr Nobody"
1962	Tales of Mystery	Jessica	Episode: "Chinese Magic"
1964	Z Cars	Maureen Stringfellow	Episode: "A Stroll Along the Sands"
1964	Love Story	Miss Watson	Episode: "The Wooing of Miss Watson"
1966	Knock on Any Door	Sue Burton	Episode: "Sunday in Prospective"
1966	Love Story	The Girl	Episode: "Dead Set at Dream Boy"
1967	Theatre 625	Mavis	Episode: "The Lost Years of Brian Hooper"
1970	ITV Sunday Night Theatre	Maria	Episode: "Twelfth Night"
1971	Owen, M.D.	Mrs. Shackles	2 episodes
1972	Thirty-Minute Theatre	Mrs. Berry	Episode: "And For My Next Trick"
1973	Justice	Madge	Episode: "The Whole Truth?"
1973	Owen, M.D.	Mabel Simpson	2 episodes
1978, 1990	All Creatures Great and Small	Mrs. Donovan	2 episodes
1978	The Sweeney	Doreen Haskins	Episode: "Victims"
1980	Flickers	Lily Brewer	All 6 episodes
1981	Somewhere More Central	Pat	TV film
1981	Get Lost!	Miss Langley	All 4 episodes
1982	Fame Is the Spur	Mrs. Ryerson	4 episodes
1983	The Home Front	Hilda	Episode: "Walk in My Shoes"
1983	Gunfight at the Joe Kaye Corral	Cathie	TV film
1983	The Aerodrome	Bessie's Mother	TV film
1983	Farmers Arms	Mrs. Rice	TV film
1983	Auf Wiedersehen Pet	Patsy	Episode: "Home Thoughts from Abroad"
1984	Horizon	Mrs. Hughes	Episode: "The Intelligence Man"
1984	Miracles Take Longer	Mrs. Hook	2 episodes
1985	Doctor Who	Etta	Episode: "Vengeance on Varos"
1986	Raspberry Ripple	Alice	TV film
1987	Never Say Die	Woman in street	Episode: #1.2
1990	Tygo Road	Bridget O'Casey	Episode: #1.2
1993	You, Me and It	Betty	2 episodes
1993	Taggart	Jessie Fraser	3 episodes
1993	15: The Life and Death of Philip Knight	Dr. Elizabeth Perry	TV film
1995	Oliver's Travels	Eileen	Episode: "Do We Look Like That?"
1995	The Ghostbusters of East Finchley	Hilda	6 episodes
1995	Doctor Finlay	Tilda MacLean	Episode: "No Time for Heroes"
1998	My Wonderful Life	Mrs. McIntyre	Episode: "The Ring"
1998	Where the Heart Is	Edith Woodford	Episode: "She Goes On"
1999	The Bill	Claire	2 episodes
2000	The Sleeper	Mrs. Fitzhal	TV film
2001	Doctors	Louise Kingston	Episode: "Retiring the Past"
2002	Monarch of the Glen	Reverend Alice	Episode: #4.3
2003	Midsomer Murders	Mrs. Metcalfe	Episode: "Painted In Blood"
2005	Casualty	Cynthia Hollis	Episode: "Deep Water"
2006	The Afternoon Play	Edith	Episode: "Your Mother Should Know"
2006	Sea of Souls	Aggie the Chambermaid	Episode: "The Newsroom"
2006	The Bill	Audrey Thorp	Episode: "Almost Human"
2007–2016	Benidorm	Madge Harvey	45 episodes
2008	Bones	Paige Bonham	Episode: "The Yanks in the U.K."
2008	Place of Execution	Ma Lomas	3 episodes
2009	Doctors	Ivy Brownlow	Episode: "You People"
2009	Holby City	Evelyn Mackonickle	Episode: "Trust"
2009	Theatre Live!	Nora	Episode: "Mind Away"
2010	Casualty	Loretta Parks	Episode: "Into the Fog"
2009, 2011	Psychoville	Grandma	2 episodes
2011	Justice	Alice	2 episodes
2011	Doctors	Eena McFee	Episode: "Seize the Day"
2011	Case Histories	Ms MacDonald	2 episodes
2012–2014	Psychobitches	Various	5 episodes
2012	Call the Midwife	Mrs. Jenkins	Episode: "Christmas Special"
2012	A Christmas Corrie	Police Officer	TV film
2013	Bob Servant Independent	Margo Servant	Episode: "The Media"
2013, 2014	Doctor Who	Gran	2 episodes
2014	Doctors	Sid Dalmond	Episode: "Sid's Blues"
2014	Mountain Goats	Lady Carnsworth	Episode: "Miller's Mountain"
2014	Casualty	Gwen Morgan	Episode: "Return to Sender"
2015	Father Brown	Lady Edna Forbes-Leith	Episode: "The Truth in the Wine"
2015	Pypo	Magda	Episode: "Personal Critiquer"
2016	Casualty	Sheila Bobbins	Episode: "Schoolboy Crush"
2017	Halloween Comedy Shorts	Lucy	Episode: "A Deal"
2017	Murder on the Blackpool Express	Mildred	TV film
2018	Humans	Iris	Episode: #3.5
2018	Death on the Tyne	Mildred	TV film
2019	Dial M for Middlesbrough	Mildred	TV film
2020	Doctors	'Speedy Sue' Burgess	Episode: "Together Time"
2020	Out of Her Mind	Mrs. Answers	Episode: "My Life is Ova"
2022–2024	Big Boys	Iris	7 episodes
2023	Dreamland	Nan	All 6 episodes
2023	Inside No. 9	Mollie	Episode: "The Last Weekend"
2023	The Power of Parker	Gladys	All 6 episodes
2023	Bodies	Baroness Antonia Garner	Episode: "All in Good Time"
2023	Beyond Paradise	Kathleen Jones	Episode: "Christmas Special"

== Video Game credits ==
- Final Fantasy XIV: Shadowbringers (2020) as Master Matoya (taking over the role from Sheila Steafel, who died in 2019)

== Select National Theatre credits ==
- The Master Builder (1964)
- Othello (1964/1965)
- The Crucible (1965) directed by Laurence Olivier
- Love for Love (1965)
- Three Sisters (1967/1968) directed by Olivier
- Home and Beauty (1968/1969)
- Love's Labour's Lost (1968)
- Sweeney Todd: The Demon Barber of Fleet Street (1993)

== Other selected theatre credits ==
- Martin Guerre: Prince Edward Theatre, London (1996)
- The Importance of Being Earnest: Theatre Royal Haymarket, London (1999)
- Pericles, Prince of Tyre: Sam Wanamaker Playhouse, London (2015)
- Troilus and Cressida: Royal Shakespeare Company (2018)
