= Rhiannon Clements =

English actress (born 1994)

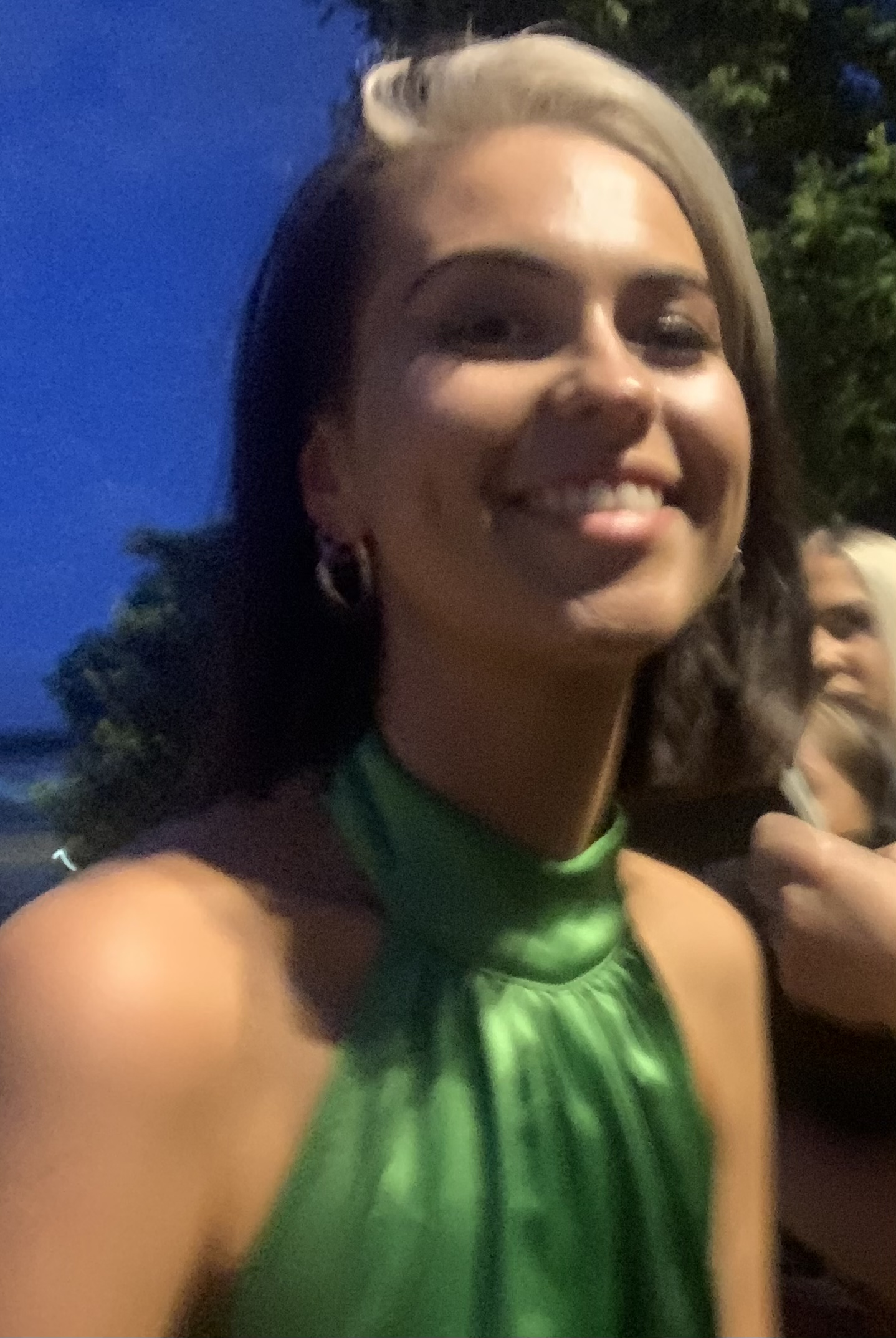
- Clements in 2022
- Born: Rhiannon Grace Clements; 1 December 1994 (age 31); Blackburn, England
- Occupation: Actress
- Years active: 2018–present

Rhiannon Grace Clements (born 1 December 1994) is an English actress. While studying at the Academy of Live and Recorded Arts (ALRA North), Clements began starring in various theatre productions, and went on to be awarded Best Stage Actor at the Spotlight Prize in 2019.

From 2020 to 2021, she portrayed the role of Summer Ranger in the Channel 4 soap opera Hollyoaks. For her portrayal of the role, Clements was nominated in the Newcomer category at the 26th National Television Awards. Since leaving the soap, she has starred in various television series including Maryland, The Power of Parker and Vera.

== Early life ==
Clements was born in Blackburn, England. She was born with a foreshortened left arm. At the age of four, Clements was enrolled into dance classes by her mother in order to boost her confidence, but she felt that dance was not right for her, and instead enrolled herself into youth theatre classes. Clements attended Ribblesdale High School in Clitheroe, and ALRA North. At ALRA North, she studied towards and obtained a degree in acting.

== Career ==
In 2018, Clements made her professional stage debut in a production of The Tempest; she then starred in various other stage productions, including Alice in Wonderland, Wuthering Heights and The Glass Menagerie. In 2019, she was awarded Best Stage Actor at the Spotlight Prize. One of the judges highlighted Clements' performance as a standout from the ceremony, stating that she connected to the audience well. Following auditioning for various roles after relocating to Manchester in 2019, Clements booked a role as Bescot in two episodes of the BBC series Doctor Who.

In 2020, it was announced that Clements had joined the cast of the Channel 4 soap opera Hollyoaks as Summer Ranger, the daughter of established character Cormac (James Gaddas). When Clements' agent phoned her to inform her that she had booked the role, she thought that it would be bad news. She expressed her excitement at joining Hollyoaks since she watched the soap whilst growing up. Months into her tenure, it was confirmed that Summer would be a villain. During her time on the series, Clements appeared in an episode of its online documentary spin-off series Hollyoaks: IRL, where she discussed the representation of her disability on the soap. After her character is imprisoned, Clements announced her departure from Hollyoaks, but stated that she intends on returning to the soap in the future. For her portrayal of Summer, Clements received a shortlist nomination in the Newcomer category at the 26th National Television Awards. Later in 2021, Clements received three nominations at the Inside Soap Awards. Then in 2022, she was nominated for the British Soap Award for Villain of the Year.

Following her Hollyoaks exit, Clements appeared in the Channel 4 comedy series Big Boys, as well as appearing in an episode of the ITV drama series Ridley. In 2023, Clements filmed numerous projects. She starred in the ITV drama series Maryland and the BBC comedy series The Power of Parker, appeared in an episode of the Britbox period drama Sister Boniface Mysteries. Also in 2023, Clements joined the cast of the ITV crime drama Vera and debuted in episodes broadcast in early 2024. She portrayed the role of DC Stephanie Duncan.

== Filmography ==
Key
†	Denotes television productions that have not yet been released

Year	Title	Role	Notes
2020	Doctor Who	Bescot	Episodes: "Ascension of the Cybermen" and "The Timeless Children"
2020	The Other One	Melanie	Recurring role
2020–2021	Hollyoaks	Summer Ranger	Regular role
2021	Hollyoaks: IRL	Herself	1 episode
2022	Death on the Nile	Hotel Administrator	Film
2022	Big Boys	Mad Debs	Recurring role
2022	Ridley	Jenna Noble	Episode: "Hospitality"
2023	Sister Boniface Mysteries	Fliss Forsyth	Episode: "Don't Try This at Home"
2023	Maryland	Lauren	Main role
2023	Platform 7	Izzy	Main role
2023-2025	The Power of Parker	Bev	Main role
2024	Daddy Issues	Rochelle	Episode: "Normal Men"
2024–2025	Vera	DC Stephanie Duncan	Main role
2025	Pushers	Jo	
2025	Riot Women	Melissa	1 episode
2026	Patience	Zinzi Rooks	Recurring role
2026	Small Prophets	Professor Drinkwater	2 episodes
2026	Death Valley	Minerva Maddox	1 episode
2026 †	Number 10 †		Upcoming series

== Stage ==
Year	Title	Role	Venue	Ref.
2018	The Tempest	Prospero	ALRA North	
2018	Alice in Wonderland	Alice	ALRA North	
2019	The Merchant of Venice	Salarina	Stafford Gatehouse Theatre	
2020	Wuthering Heights	Isabella Linton / Frances Earnshaw	Royal Exchange Theatre	
2020, 2022	The Glass Menagerie	Laura Wingfield	Royal Exchange Theatre	
2024	Underdog: The Other Other Brontë	Anne Brontë	National Theatre	

== Awards and nominations ==
Year	Ceremony	Category	Result	Ref.
2019	Spotlight Prize	Best Stage Actor	Won	
2021	26th National Television Awards	Newcomer	Nominated	
2021	Inside Soap Awards	Best Newcomer	Nominated	
2021	Inside Soap Awards	Best Partnership (with Anna Passey)	Nominated	
2021	Inside Soap Awards	Best Villain	Nominated	
2022	The British Soap Awards	Villain of the Year	Nominated	
