= 26th National Television Awards =

British awards ceremony in 2021

- Date: 9 September 2021
- Location: The O2 Arena, Greenwich, London
- Country: United Kingdom
- Presented by: Various
- Hosted by: Joel Dommett
- Most awards: Coronation Street (3)
- Most nominations: Coronation Street; Line of Duty (4)
- Website: www.nationaltvawards.com

Television/radio coverage
- Network: ITV

The 26th National Television Awards were held on 9 September 2021 at the O2. The ceremony was the first to be hosted by Joel Dommett who replaces David Walliams after only one year. The ceremony was originally scheduled for January 2021, but was pushed to April due to the COVID-19 pandemic; the ceremony was once again postponed to September 2021. The longlist nominations were announced on 25 May 2021 and the shortlist was announced on 17 August 2021.

== Performances ==
- Hrvy feat. Frog, Beagle, Zip, Scarecrow, Squirrel and Carwash from The Masked Dancer and Janette Manrara - "Runaway With It"
- JLS - "Beat Again", "Eternal Love" and "Everybody in Love"

== Awards ==
Category and presenter(s)	Winner	Nominated
"The Sir Bruce Forsyth Entertainment Award"; Presented by Maya Jama	I'm a Celebrity..Get Me Out Of Here! (ITV)	Taskmaster (Channel 4); The Graham Norton Show (BBC One); Ant & Dec's Saturday Night Takeaway (ITV)
"Challenge Show"; Presented by Danny Jones & Pixie Lott	The Great British Bake Off (Channel 4)	Celebrity SAS: Who Dares Wins (Channel 4); The Great British Sewing Bee (BBC Two); Love Island (ITV2)
"Serial Drama Performance"; Presented by Charlie Brooks	Mollie Gallagher (Nina Lucas, Coronation Street - ITV)	Billy Price (Sid Sumner, Hollyoaks - Channel 4); Sally Carman (Abi Franklin, Coronation Street - ITV); Danny Dyer (Mick Carter, EastEnders - BBC One)
"Comedy"; Presented by Katherine Ryan & Tom Allen	After Life (Netflix)	The Vicar of Dibley (BBC One); Sex Education (Netflix); Friday Night Dinner (Channel 4)
"New Drama"; Presented by Bear Grylls	It's a Sin (Channel 4)	Bridgerton (Netflix); Normal People (BBC Three); Des (ITV)
"Quiz Game Show"; Presented by Clive Myrie	Beat the Chasers (ITV)	Michael McIntyre's The Wheel (BBC One); In For A Penny (ITV); Celebrity Catchphrase (ITV)
"Newcomer"; Presented by Millie Court, Liam Reardon, Kaz Kamwi and Liberty Poole from Love Island	Jude Riordan (Sam Blakeman, Coronation Street - ITV)	Emile John (Ethan Anderson, Emmerdale - ITV); Olivia D'Lima (Fenisha Khatri, Casualty - BBC One); Rose Ayling-Ellis (Frankie Lewis, EastEnders - BBC One); Rhiannon Clements (Summer Ranger, Hollyoaks - Channel 4)
"Authored Documentary"; Presented by Davina McCall	Kate Garraway: Finding Derek (ITV)	Roman Kemp: Our Silent Emergency (BBC Three); Marcus Rashford: Feeding Britain's Children (BBC One); Katie Price: Harvey and Me (BBC One); Rob Burrow: My Year With MND (BBC One)
"Special Recognition"; Presented by Joel Dommett	Line of Duty (BBC One)	
"Daytime"; Presented by Vernon Kay	This Morning (ITV)	Loose Women (ITV); The Chase (ITV); The Repair Shop (BBC One)
"Drama Performance"; Presented by Michael Sheen	David Tennant (Des Nilsen, Des - ITV)	Olly Alexander (Ritchie Tozer, It's a Sin - Channel 4); Vicky McClure (Kate Fleming, Line of Duty - BBC One); Martin Compston (Steve Arnott, Line of Duty - BBC One); Adrian Dunbar (Ted Hastings, Line of Duty - BBC One)
"Factual"; Presented by Stephen McGann	Gogglebox (Channel 4)	Paul O'Grady: For the Love of Dogs (ITV); Gordon, Gino and Fred: American Road Trip (ITV); Caroline Flack: Her Life and Death (Channel 4)
"Returning Drama"; Presented by Jason Kenny & Dame Sarah Storey	Line of Duty (BBC One)	Call the Midwife (BBC One); The Crown (Netflix); Unforgotten (ITV)
"TV Presenter"; Presented by Fred Siriex & Andrea Spendolini-Sirieix	Ant & Dec	Holly Willoughby; Alison Hammond; Bradley Walsh; Piers Morgan
"Talent Show"; Presented by Martin Kemp	Strictly Come Dancing (BBC One)	Britain's Got Talent (ITV); RuPaul's Drag Race UK (BBC Three); The Masked Singer UK (ITV)
"Serial Drama"; Presented by Dame Joan Collins	Coronation Street (ITV)	Emmerdale (ITV); Hollyoaks (Channel 4); EastEnders (BBC One)

== Programmes with multiple nominations ==
Programmes that received multiple nominations
Nominations	Programme
4	Coronation Street
4	Line of Duty
3	EastEnders
3	Hollyoaks
3	This Morning
2	Ant & Dec's Saturday Night Takeaway
2	Beat the Chasers
2	Britain's Got Talent
2	Des
2	Emmerdale
2	I'm a Celebrity...Get Me Out of Here!
2	It's a Sin
2	The Chase

Networks with multiple nominations
Nominations	Network
27	ITV
18	BBC One
10	Channel 4
4	Netflix
3	BBC Three

== Programmes with multiple wins ==
Programmes with multiple wins
Wins	Programme
3	Coronation Street
2	I'm a Celebrity...Get Me Out of Here!
2	Line of Duty

Networks with multiple wins
Wins	Network
9	ITV
3	BBC One
3	Channel 4

== See also ==
- 2021 in British television
- Impact of the COVID-19 pandemic on television
