= Josh Bolt =

English actor (born 1994)

- Born: Joshua Ryan Bolt; 2 May 1994 (age 32); Liverpool, England
- Occupation: Actor
- Years active: 2009–present

Joshua Ryan Bolt (born 2 May 1994) is an English actor best known for his roles as Raff Greenwood in Last Tango in Halifax and Rob Dawson in Benidorm. Other credits include the titular character in Just Henry (2011), Dunbar in George Clooney's miniseries Catch-22 (2019) and Lt. Pappy Lewis in Tom Hanks' Masters of the Air (2024).

== Early life ==
Joshua Ryan Bolt was born in Halewood, Liverpool on 2 May 1994. He grew up in Halewood and attended Halewood College before dropping out of school six months into his A-levels to pursue acting full-time.

== Career ==
Bolt began acting at the age of 11 and was cast in his first theatre production, Much Ado About Nothing at Liverpool Playhouse, after one of his teachers encouraged him to attend an open audition. He joined YULA Drama School not long after, which led to his casting as Robbie Wallace in the 2009 film The Be All and End All, which, in turn, attracted the attention of a casting director and landed him the role of Pete Shotton in Nowhere Boy. Bolt was cast in the lead role of ITV1's Just Henry in summer 2011. He then joined the second series of Accused.

In 2012, Bolt joined the nascent cast of Last Tango in Halifax, where he played Raphael "Raff" Greenwood. The first series won best drama at the 2013 BAFTA Television Awards and filming for the second series began in June 2013. Bolt later reprised his role for the third (2014), fourth (2016) and fifth (2020) series. Bolt's early guest appearances include as Adam on Lewis and a short arc as Frasier Kane in the ninth series of Shameless. He played Brian Harris in the BBC Three drama The Crash and Daniel in the third series of Scott & Bailey. In 2013, he appeared in The Heart of Nowhere, a film directed by Charlie Fink to coincide with Noah and the Whale's final album.

Bolt joined the cast of Benidorm series eight in 2015 as Rob Dawson. In December 2015, he appeared as soldier Thomas Macquillanin ITV1's Harry Price Ghost Hunter. In 2016, he guest starred in the second series of Grantchester and as Reburrus in Barbarians Rising. In November, he filmed a two-part Christmas special of Last Tango in Halifax. In 2018, Bolt reprised the role of Rob Dawson in the tenth series of Benidorm. The following year, he played Donal in the film A Good Woman Is Hard to Find and Dunbar in the Catch-22 miniseries of the same name. Around this time, he was also featured in the Luka State's music video for "Kick in The Teeth." In 2025, he appeared in Andrew Gower's music video "Closer."

In addition to acting onscreen, Bolt has also held several roles in audio dramas. In 2016, he voiced Kalan, a companion of the War Doctor, in the third series of the audio drama The War Doctor. This was followed by "Dethras" (2017), wherein he played a companion of the Fourth Doctor, and two episodes of The Diary of River Song (2017) as River's cyborg companion Spod. He also voiced Antonio in Elena Ferrante's The Story of a New Name adapted for BBC Radio 4 by Timberlake Wertenbaker.

== Personal life ==
In 2021, following mental health struggles during the COVID-19 lockdown, Bolt organised a hike up Ben Nevis to raise money for three charities: Whitechapel Centre in Liverpool, Young Person's Advisory Service, and the Scottish Association for Mental Health. He recruited 95 other people, settling on a group of 96 to honour the 96 Liverpool fans who died in the 1989 Hillsborough disaster.

== Filmography ==
=== Film ===
Year	Film	Role	Notes	Ref
2009	The Be All and End All	Robbie Wallace		
2009	Nowhere Boy	Pete Shotton		
2013	Heart of Nowhere	Floyd	Short film	
2019	A Good Woman Is Hard to Find	Donal		

=== Television ===
Year	Title	Role	Notes	Ref
2011	Just Henry	Henry Dodge	TV film	
2012	Shameless	Frasier Kane	3 episodes	
2012	Accused	Dom Cartwright		
2012–2020	Last Tango in Halifax	Raff Greenwood	Main role, 24 episodes	
2013	Lewis	Adam Tibitt		
2013	The Crash	Brian Harris		
2013	Scott & Bailey	Daniel Gallagher	1 episode	
2015	Harry Price: Ghost Hunter	Thomas Macquillan		
2016–2018	Benidorm	Rob Dawson	Main role	
2016	Grantchester	Rory Crompton		
2016	Barbarians Rising	Reburrus		
2018	The Quarter: Teaser	Todd	Short	
2019	Catch-22	Dunbar	Miniseries	
2020	Anthony	Michael Barton	TV film	
2023	Van der Valk	Gert Hoist		
2024	Masters of the Air	Lt. Winifred "Pappy" Lewis	Miniseries	
2024	Ellis	DI Archie Dent		
2024 - present	Ludwig	Adam Newsum		
2026	The Blame	DC Douglas James		

=== Radio/Audio ===
Year	Title	Role	Production	Notes	Ref
2016	The War Doctor	Kalan	Big Finish Productions	Series 3: Agents of Chaos	
2017	The Fourth Doctor Adventures	Philip	Big Finish Productions	Series 6, number 4: "Dethras"	
2017	The Story of a New Name	Antonio	BBC Radio 4		
2018	The Diary of River Song	Spod	Big Finish Productions	Series 4, number 1 ("Time in a Bottle") and 2 ("Kings of Infinite Space")	
