= Connor McIntyre =

English actor (born 1960)

- Born: 30 November 1960 (age 65)
- Occupation: Actor
- Years active: 1992–present
- Known for: Always and Everyone (1999–2002); The Jury (2002); Buried (2003); Murder City (2004–2006); Outlaws (2004); Drop Dead Gorgeous (2006–2007); The Case (2011); Coronation Street (2013–2014, 2016–2018)

Connor McIntyre (born 30 November 1960) is an English actor, best known for playing villain Pat Phelan in the ITV soap opera Coronation Street from 2013 to 2014 and again from 2016 to 2018, but has also had large roles in TV shows such as Always and Everyone, The Jury, Buried, Murder City, Outlaws, Drop Dead Gorgeous and The Case.

== Career ==
McIntyre began acting when he joined the Barbican Theatre in Plymouth. He has appeared in numerous television shows, including The Bill, Casualty, Heartbeat, Law & Order: UK and Doctors. His film roles include The Be All and End All and Charlie Noads R.I.P while his stage work includes appearances in The Comedy of Errors, One for the Road and Harry's Christmas.

== Filmography ==
=== Television ===
Year	Title	Role	Notes
1994, 1995, 1997, 1999	The Bill	Lee Saunders; Ray Belcher; Vince Grover; Stevie	4 episodes
1995	Backup	Instructor	Episode: "Tender Loving Care"
1995, 1998	London's Burning	Policeman; Terry	2 episodes
1997	Silent Witness	Tony Kennedy	Episodes: "Blood, Sweat and Tears: Parts 1 & 2"
1997	Pilgrim's Rest	Dagger	Episode: "Rock of Ages"
1997	Trial & Retribution	Mr Hall	2 episodes
1997	The Investigator	SGT Jimmy Rumbeld	Television film
1997, 2009, 2013, 2025	Casualty	Clive Belfield; Robert Prentice; PC Owen Daniels; Kenny Sanders	4 episodes
1998	Human Bomb	Policeman #2	Television film
1998	City Central	Ed Morton	Episode: "Throwing It All Away"
1999	Liverpool 1	John Kelly	Episode: "King of the Castle"
1999–2002	Always and Everyone	Terry Harker	Regular cast member 38 episodes (4 series)
2002	The Jury	Derek Batey	Main role, 6 episodes (1 series)
2003	Buried	Martin Steddon	Main role, 8 episodes (1 series)
2003	Danielle Cable: Eyewitness	Steve Allan	Television film
2004–2006	Murder City	DC Frank Craven	Main role, 10 episodes (2 series)
2004	Outlaws	Superintendent Gary Jackson	Supporting role, 4 episodes (1 series)
2005	Waking the Dead	DCI Gulley	Episodes: "Black Run: Parts 1 & 2"
2005	Heartbeat	Adam Lee	Episode: "The Good Samaritan"
2006	See No Evil: The Moors Murders	DCS Dougie Nimmo	Season 1, episode 2
2006–2007	Drop Dead Gorgeous	Terry Webb	Main role, 9 episodes (2 series)
2006	Vincent	Concierge	Season 2, episode 1
2008	Messiah V: The Rapture	Michael Wallace	TV mini-series; episodes #1.1 and #1.2
2008	Wire in the Blood	Peter Curren	Episodes: "From the Defeated: Parts 1 & 2"
2008	Summerhill	Len	Television film
2009	Law & Order: UK	Sergeant Howard Drake	Episode: "Samaritan"
2011	Doctors	Brian Neilson	Episode: "Payback"
2011	The Case	Neil Stanley	Main role, 5 episodes (1 series)
2013	Casualty	Policeman	1 episode
2013	Great Night Out	Tony	2 episodes
2013–2014, 2016–2018	Coronation Street	Pat Phelan	Regular cast member 358 episodes
2021–2022	Ackley Bridge	Grandad Cooper	Guest role
2025	Casualty	Kenny Saunders	Guest role

=== Film ===
Year	Film	Role	Notes
1997	House of America	Matty	Feature film
2004	Yasmin	Reception officer	Feature film
2006	Pu-239	Facility Director	Feature film
2007	Paraffin	Boss	Short film
2009	The Be All and End All	Mr Wallace	Feature film
2014	Svoboda 2.0	Unnamed	Short video
2014	Visiting Hour	Son	Short film
2023	Our Kid	John Reilly	Feature film

=== Guest appearances ===
- Lorraine (2014, 2016, 2017, 2018)
- This Morning (2016, 2017, 2020)
- Good Morning Britain (2017)
- Saturday Mash-Up! (2018)

== Awards and nominations ==
Year	Ceremony	Award	Nominated work	Result	Ref.
2016	The British Soap Awards	Villain of the Year	Coronation Street as Pat Phelan	Won	
2018	The British Soap Awards	Best Actor	Coronation Street as Pat Phelan	Nominated	
2018	The British Soap Awards	Best Male Dramatic Performance	Coronation Street as Pat Phelan	Nominated	
2018	The British Soap Awards	Villain of the Year	Coronation Street as Pat Phelan	Won	
