= Buried (TV series) =

2003 TV series or program

- Genre: Crime drama
- Created by: Jimmy Gardner; Robert Jones; Kath Mattock
- Directed by: Morag McKinnon; Kenneth Gleenan
- Starring: Lennie James; Stephen Walters; Connor McIntyre; Jane Hazlegrove; Neil Bell; Smug Roberts; Neil Fitzmaurice
- Country of origin: United Kingdom
- Original language: English
- No. of series: 1
- No. of episodes: 8

Production
- Executive producer: Tony Garnett
- Producer: Diana Barton
- Production location: United Kingdom
- Cinematography: Mark Waters
- Editors: Paul Endacott; David Gibson
- Running time: 60 minutes
- Production company: World Productions

Original release
- Network: Channel 4
- Release: 14 January – 4 March 2003

Buried is a British television prison drama, produced by World Productions for Channel 4 and originally broadcast between 14 January and 4 March 2003. The eight-part series starred Lennie James, Stephen Walters, Connor McIntyre, Jane Hazlegrove, and Neil Bell in key roles.

== Plot ==
The lives of the prisoners and guards are intertwined within D Wing of Her Majesty's Prison (HMP) Mandrake Hill, a category B prison in the North of England. Lee Kingley (Lenny James), a first time prisoner and previously upstanding family man, is sentenced to serve ten years for Grievous Bodily Harm (GBH) and a firearm offense for defending his sister from her rapist. Respected by the other inmates due to the nature of his crime, Kingsley soon rises to the top of the prison hierarchy alongside his brother and hardened criminal Troy (Dave Fishley). With his mental health in question, Troy is soon transferred to a maximum security prison, leaving Kingsley in charge of a drug and money-lending business with fellow inmate Kappa Kid (James Wells). Disturbed by this development and the news that his wife will not be visiting with his daughter as expected, Kingsley begins to believe the rumors circulating about Kappa. Unsure whom to trust and haunted by his experiences, life for Kingsley becomes one altercation after another.

Prison psychologist Dr. Nick Vaughan (Stephen Walters) runs the Drug Free Unit (DFU) of the prison, working with the prisoners on a one-on-one and group basis. When Officer Deidre Burridge (Jane Hazelgrove) is referred to him by her superior, Officer Martin Steddon (Conor McIntyre), in lieu of disciplinary action for striking a prisoner, the two begin a sexual relationship. Revealing themselves both emotionally and physically ends in violence and resentment for the couple. Vaughn is discovered to have been involved with a crime as a child, Burrdige was assaulted by men in her past, Officer Dave Stour (Smug Roberts) takes financial advice from a prisoner, and Governor Chris Russo (Neil Fitzmaurice) is more interested in how the prison looks to other officials than its actual state. Their interactions with each other and the prisoners leads to both clashes and a questioning of personal motivations for working within the prison system.

== Production ==
Produced by Tony Garrett's company World Productions, Buried was conceived to give an authentic look at prison life in the UK. The series was co-created by Jimmy Gardner, Robert Jones, and Kath Mattock, who had previously collaborated on the BAFTA Award-winning BBC2 series The Cops. In order to assure authenticity, the series hired Professor David Wilson, a specialist in criminology. Wilson stated that he "...wanted to work with World Productions because [he] knew that they would present prison as it really is."

The series was described by the show's producers as portraying "the strict hierarchy that exists among prisoners, and the unspoken co-operation that allows six officers to govern hundreds of inmates", and how the "prisoners and officers alike are locked in psychological warfare, and that each day is an exercise in survival."

Through the use of lighting, camera angles, and dialogue, the series refrains from making moral judgments on the characters, showing both their strengths and weaknesses. By exploring every aspect of prison life, the series allowed television views with no direct experience of 'the inside' to view the realities of prison life.

Critically well-received, the programme won the Best Drama Series category at the British Academy Television Awards in 2004. It was suggested midway through the series run that it was unlikely to be recommissioned because of poor ratings. The series averaged just a million viewers and an 8% audience share in its Tuesday night slot of 10:35 pm. A Channel 4 spokesperson said: "It's a good piece of drama, but the audiences haven't been as good as the critical response".

== Cast ==
=== Inmates ===
- Lennie James as Lee Kingley
- Dean Andrews as Barry Sheil
- Francis Magee as Felix 'Ronaldo' Carver
- Johann Myers as Martin Wellcome
- Steve Evets as Peter 'Pele' Pelly
- Dave Fishley as Troy Kingley
- Sean Cernow as Kirk Mitchell
- Andrew Lee Potts as Henry Curtis
- Daniel Lestuzzi as Croppa 'Kid' Sims
- Joseph Kpobie as Hector French
- Bill Rodgers as John Gossie
- Anthony Flanagan as Ralph Collitt
- Mark Womack as Ronnie Keach
- Ricci Harnett as Alan Veeder
- Robbie Gee as Brewster Woolnough
- James Wells as Kappa
- Shahid Ahmed as Kamid
- Saqib Mumtaz as Omar
- Merrick Hayward as Patty
- Michael Imerson as Breezy
- Danny Nussbaum as Tammy
- Gary Cargill as Blake
- Liam Barr as Lucas
- Paul Brennen as Dolly
- James Foster as Ryan
- Steve Ramsden as Carter
- Adrian Hood as Birdman
- Sean McKee as Rollieman

=== Prison Staff ===
- Stephen Walters as Dr. Nick Vaughan
- Connor McIntyre as Officer Martin Steddon
- Jane Hazlegrove as Officer Deidre 'DD' Burridge
- Neil Bell as Officer Slacker Courtenay
- Smug Roberts as Officer David Stour
- Neil Fitzmaurice as Governor Chris Russo

== Episodes ==
No.	Title	Directed by	Written by	Original release date
1	"Episode 1"	Jimmy Gardner	Kenneth Gleenan	14 January 2003
Lee Kingley (Lennie James), a hardworking businessman and father of two, is sentenced to ten years in prison at HMP Mandrake after attempting to shoot a man who raped his sister. After serving just a week behind bars, Lee is angered when his first appeal is thrown out due to lack of evidence. Having already gathered respect amongst his fellow inmates for being the younger brother of feared con Troy Kingley (David Fishley), Lee soon comes to realise that life behind bars might not be as hard as he thinks - until he tries to help out fellow inmate Patty (Merrick Hayward) after a confrontation in the showers results in the stabbing of the much feared Felix 'Ronaldo' Calver (Francis Magee).
2	"Episode 2"	Robert Jones	Kenneth Gleenan	21 January 2003
Ronaldo returns to the wing having recovered from the stabbing, but finds he is unable to remember who he is or why he is in prison. Having refused to cough up for a crime he didn't commit, Lee now finds himself at loggerheads with Martin (Johann Myers), as well as Barry Sheil (Dean Andrews), a well connected inmate who looks after a much-wanted book on the process of lodging an appeal against any given conviction. Vaughan (Stephen Walters) tries to help out Ronaldo's former cellmate, Peter 'Pele' Pelly (Steve Evets), who is up for parole but is refusing to leave his cell. When Pele violently attacks Breezy, a fellow inmate, Vaughan tries to find out the reasons behind his erratic behaviour.
3	"Episode 3"	Jimmy Gardner	Morag McKinnon	28 January 2003
Lee's fearsome brother Troy arrives on the wing, having been responsible for stabbing two officers at his former prison. Lee is happy to spend time with him, but is reluctant to get involved with the drug dealing and money lending that his status immediately affords him. After suspecting that their cell has been bugged by listening devices, Troy plants an explosive which destroys the cell, including all of Lee's treasured pictures of his wife and daughter. New inmate Henry Curtis (Andrew Lee Potts) racks up a debt to feared inmate Kirk Mitchell (Sean Cernow), but when Kirk is 'ghosted' to another prison on Troy's orders, Henry finds himself facing much bigger problems than he first thought.
4	"Episode 4"	Richard Zajdlic	Morag McKinnon	4 February 2003
With his brother Troy 'ghosted', Lee has become top dog on the wing. He denies drug dealer Kamid (Shahid Ahmed) the opportunity of planning an escape during visiting hours after learning that his wife and daughter are coming to visit. Vaughan campaigns to help Lee get a private room for visitation, but Steddon refuses to grant permission. The inmates begin to notice a close relationship forming between officer Stour (Smug Roberts) and inmate Blake (Gary Cargill). When rumour begins to circulate that the pair are sexually involved, Stour turns the tables by naming Lee's sidekick Kappa (James Wells) as a paedophile - and later, a picture of Lee's daughter Amelie is found in Kappa's cell.
5	"Episode 5"	Robert Jones	Morag McKinnon	11 February 2003
Governor Russo receives a tip-off that an officer is bringing drugs onto D wing, and he orders Vaughan to lean on renowned grass Ralph Collitt (Anthony Flanagan) to find out who's responsible. Collitt, however, has knowledge of an offence that Vaughan was charged with as a juvenile and Vaughan suspects he may have been planted by Russo as a warning. In an attempt to regain his integrity, Vaughan challenges Crop Kid (Daniel Lestuzzi) to a kickboxing match. Meanwhile, as Lee continues to have visions of Kappa, he meets with Anderson (James Quinn), a talented artist with whom he tries to trade cells. But when he discovers Collitt is a grass, his actions place him back in segregation.
6	"Episode 6"	Stephen Brady	Kenneth Gleenan	18 February 2003
DD retaliates when she is assaulted by an angry prisoner, Alan Veeder (Ricci Harnett), who then makes a complaint against her. She is ordered to go and see Vaughan for counselling, but he uses the opportunity to exploit her vulnerable state for his own sexual gratification. Confused and ready to hand in her resignation, DD finds herself developing a friendship with new inmate Ronnie Keach (Mark Womack), jailed after throwing a whiskey bottle at his wife during an argument. Celebrity golfer Dave Pemberton (Dave Spikey) rocks up on D wing and finds himself the target of unwanted attention, and Lee's delusional state continues to worsen as his stint in segregation continues.
7	"Episode 7"	Jimmy Gardner	Kenneth Gleenan	25 February 2003
Lee returns from segregation noticeably more reserved. Barry Shiel (Dean Andrews) is now top dog, and at first, Lee is happy to let him run the wing, despite being the victim of repeated physical and verbal abuse. Lee is partnered with a new cellmate, first-timer Lucas (Liam Barr), who unaware of the prison hierarchy, befriends Sheil. When Sheil begins to sexually harass Lucas, Lee steps in and begins a clever campaign in an attempt to stop him in his tracks, gathering information on his wife and children as leverage. When Sheil later launches an unprovoked attack on fellow inmate Ryan (James Foster), his cellmate Dolly (Paul Brennen) offers to help Lee to bring Sheil to his knees.
8	"Episode 8"	Robert Jones	Kenneth Gleenan	4 March 2003
Lee receives a visit from his lawyer and two officers from CIB, DI Carrie Laxton (Poppy Miller) and DS Simon Phelps (Paul Kavanagh). CIB want him to give evidence against Paul Brown (Peter O'Connor), the policeman who helped put him inside, after evidence comes to light that Brown is corrupt and has been accepting bribes from a number of well known criminals. Meanwhile, three new prisoners arrive on D wing - Carter (Steve Ramsden), a serial killer convicted of the murder of four people in a hit-and-run, Woolnough (Robbie Gee), a con with connections to the man who Lee shot after he tried to rape his sister, and Henry Curtis, who returns after being convicted of armed robbery.

== Releases ==
In 2016, the complete series was released as a box-set on All4 and is available to watch on demand. Buried was released on DVD in 2018 by Simply Media.
