= The Case (TV series) =

2011 British television series

- Genre: Legal drama
- Written by: David Allison; Carolyn Reynolds
- Directed by: Sean Glynn; Paul Murphy
- Starring: Dean Andrews; Caroline Langrishe; Tristan Gemmill; Chanel Cresswell; Ruthie Henshall; John McArdle; Sean Chapman; Connor McIntyre
- Composer: James Warburton
- Country of origin: United Kingdom
- Original language: English
- No. of series: 1
- No. of episodes: 5

Production
- Executive producers: Liam Keelan; Gerard Melling; Carolyn Reynolds
- Producer: Sean Glynn
- Cinematography: Andrew Cooper
- Editors: Pauline Cain; Jan Deas
- Running time: 45 minutes
- Production company: Lime Pictures

Original release
- Network: BBC1
- Release: 31 October – 4 November 2011

The Case is a five-part British television legal drama series, written and created by David Allison, that broadcast over five consecutive days from 31 October 2011 on BBC One. The series stars Dean Andrews as Tony Powell, a defendant accused of the murder of his terminally ill partner Saskia Stanley (Caroline Langrishe), whose life Tony helped to end. Saskia's family suspect Tony may have an ulterior motive for helping Saskia end her life, but it falls to barrister Sol Ridley (Tristan Gemmill), defending his first murder case, to expose the truth.

Episodes were broadcast at 14:15 daily as part of the channel's daytime schedule. The Case remains David Allison's second and final original production for television, following his debut with the Sky Living series Bedlam earlier the same year.

== Production ==
The series was filmed between Liverpool and Manchester. During production, Dean Andrews asked not to know the outcome of the final episode, instead choosing to "play the truth that was on the page at that moment", in order to prevent the resolution from influencing his performance.

Shortly prior to the broadcast of the first episode, the Radio Times published an article questioning if a story focusing on assisted suicide was suitable for daytime television. Actor Tristan Gemmill defended the programme, stating; “I had initial reservations about how you tackle such an emotive, delicate and topical issue in daytime, but what David [Allison] has done is walk through the minefield and create some fascinating, strong characters. Seeing the case from multiple angles really emphasises how the ripples affect everyone involved."

== Cast ==
- Dean Andrews as Tony Powell; defendant
- Caroline Langrishe as Saskia Stanley; victim
- Tristan Gemmill as Sol Ridley; defence barrister
- Chanel Cresswell as Julie Prior; pupil barrister
- Ruthie Henshall as Valerie Mornay; defence barrister
- John McArdle as Gordon McAllister; senior clerk
- Sean Chapman as Mark Metzler; prosecution barrister
- Connor McIntyre as Neil Stanley; Saskia's ex-husband
- Karl Davies as Dan Stanley; Saskia and Neil's son
- Michelle Tate as Jess Stanley; Saskia and Neil's daughter
- Russell Dixon as Judge Hopwood; presiding judge
- Dominic Carter as Karl Rankine
- Tupele Dorgu as Nicole Jones

== Episodes ==
No.	Title	Directed by	Written by	Airdate
1	"Episode 1"	Sean Glynn	David Allison & Carolyn Reynolds	31 October 2011
Barrister Sol Ridley gets his first murder case, defending Tony Powell. Tony admits assisting his terminally-ill partner, Saskia, to end her life, but Saskia's family think he killed her to get his hands on her money. After the first day of the trial, a stressed Tony takes drastic action.
2	"Episode 2"	Sean Glynn	David Allison & Carolyn Reynolds	1 November 2011
Sol plays a blinder in court, but then Metzler produces a new witness who gives damaging evidence against Tony. Tony is being harassed and tells Jess that he is convinced her dad is behind it. And Julie puts her foot in it with Sol, after being set up by Metzler.
3	"Episode 3"	Sean Glynn	David Allison & Carolyn Reynolds	2 November 2011
Tony's big day in the witness box begins badly after a disturbing encounter outside court. Under oath and under pressure, Tony makes an unwise accusation against Neil. That evening, Julie takes a big decision, and Tony's best friend Karl makes a shocking discovery.
4	"Episode 4"	Paul Murphy	David Allison & Carolyn Reynolds	3 November 2011
Karl drops a bombshell in the witness box, damaging Tony's credibility. And amidst mounting animosity, Valerie discovers something that could bring Julie down.
5	"Episode 5"	Paul Murphy	David Allison & Carolyn Reynolds	4 November 2011
Jess and Dan grapple with an appalling discovery about Neil, while Julie and Sol come to a decision about their relationship. In court, Tony recalls Saskia's final moments, as the jury reach their verdict on his future.
