= Summer Ranger =

Fictional character from Hollyoaks

- Hollyoaks character
- Portrayed by: Rhiannon Clements
- Duration: 2020–2021
- First appearance: Episode 5475; 25 November 2020
- Last appearance: Episode 5708; 27 October 2021
- Introduced by: Bryan Kirkwood
In-universe information
- Other names: Sienna Blake
- Occupation: Businesswoman
- Father: Cormac Ranger

Summer Ranger is a fictional character from the British Channel 4 soap opera Hollyoaks, played by Rhiannon Clements. Clements' casting was announced on 19 October 2020, and the actress made her first appearance on 25 November 2020. Summer was introduced as the daughter of established character Cormac Ranger (James Gaddas). Two sides of Summer's personality have been explored since her introduction, with scenes showing her to have "sweetness and light" to her, while also possessing a nasty side. Digital Spy wrote that her introduction would have troubling consequences for Brody Hudson (Adam Woodward), Warren Fox (Jamie Lomas) and Felix Westwood (Richard Blackwood), all of whom were involved in an attack on her father. Summer was also billed as a "frenemy" for Sienna Blake (Anna Passey), with who she later forms a romantic connection. After her 12-month contract with the soap had ended, it was announced that Clements would be departing from Hollyoaks.

For her portrayal of Summer, Clements was nominated for the Newcomer award at the 26th National Television Awards. She has also been nominated in three categories at the upcoming Inside Soap Awards. Paul Fogarty of HITC noted that the actress had "made a huge impact on Hollyoaks" and that her character "has been an explosive presence" since her arrival. He also appreciated that her story arc had not revolved around her disability. Stephen Patterson of the Metro wrote that Clements has "well and truly made her mark as Hollyoaks' resident schemer" and that despite being new to the soap, she had "made herself right at home".

== Casting and characterisation ==
Details surrounding both the character and Rhiannon Clements' casting were announced exclusively by Digital Spy on 19 October 2020. A spokesperson for the soap said that Summer will seem "angelic on the outside", but that she is secretly a "mischievous minx". They also described her as "a bright, effortlessly cool tomboy" but said that "when she wants something, she's capable of going to extreme lengths to get it". Clements was "absolutely buzzing and extremely grateful" to be cast in Hollyoaks amidst the COVID-19 pandemic. She found her character to be fun and sarcastic and appreciated the "zest" and "bite" Summer has. Clements opined that Summer is an interesting role for her to play due to having two extremes to her personality; "sweetness and light" and a nastiness. She liked that there is a "juxtaposition to play with" and have Summer "presenting as one thing, but actually having the undertones of another thing". Clements explained that these aspects of her personality are caused by events in her backstory. She said that her backstory had not been explored fully since she had just arrived in the village, but confirmed that "there's a lot that's gone on in her past that informs the way she behaves". She opined that there are redeeming qualities to Summer, and that there are ways of redeeming her character for viewers, but it is down to what Summer wants, adding: "I don't think she's fully made up her mind over how far she wants to go." The actress also joked that she is jealous of her character's wardrobe.

== Development ==
=== Introduction and sexuality ===
Daniel Kilkelly of Digital Spy wrote that Summer's introduction would lead to trouble for Brody Hudson (Adam Woodward), Warren Fox (Jamie Lomas) and Felix Westwood (Richard Blackwood), since they are responsible for the death of her father Cormac (James Gaddas). Summer arrives in Hollyoaks village looking for Cormac, "much to the concern of Brody, Felix and Warren". It was also stated by Kilkelly that Summer would become a "frenemy" for Sienna Blake (Anna Passey), in scenes that would see Summer "give Sienna [...] a run for her money in life – and maybe love". Upon her arrival, she opens a baking business in the Grand Bazaar, which Kilkelly said would give her "a place right at the heart of the village".

In scenes that aired on Channel 4 on 25 November 2020, Summer arrives at Hollyoaks hospital to visit her father Cormac, where she meets Brody. Brody does initially not know Summer is related to Cormac, whom he put in a coma alongside Warren and Felix. Woodward, who portrays Brody, stated that when his character realises Summer's connection to Cormac, he feels "sheer panic" and tries to put the situation right. He gives Summer a job and does not feel concerned that she will discover the truth, but eventually as "the plot thickens and the story moves along", Summer begins to make realisations about what happened. In December 2020, the Metro reported that Brody may cheat on partner Sienna with Summer, since the pair were "getting closer". Summer plans to raise money for the children's home that Cormac worked at, so calls former residents of the home. Brody learns of her plans and becomes worried that she will contact Warren or Felix since they were residents.

In a scene with bisexual character Grace Black (Tamara Wall), Summer states that she does not consider gender when she is dating somebody. On representing Summer's sexuality in the series, Clements stated that the representation of minority groups is "a step in the right direction and there needs to be more of it on TV". She expressed her happiness with Summer having no label on her sexuality since it meant that there could be no stereotypes placed onto her character; she also praised Hollyoaks for their ongoing representation of minority groups. Viewers commented on the potential romantic pairing of Summer and Grace, which Clements described as "an interesting dynamic". She continued by saying that Grace and Summer's friendship is like nothing else that Summer has in the village, adding: "it'll be interesting to see what happens, you never know."

=== Revenge on Brody Hudson ===
In January 2021, Summer overhears Sienna talking to Warren about the attack on her father. She concludes that Warren is responsible for the attack. Speaking to Inside Soap about her character's response to her discovery, Clements said that Summer will seek revenge for what Warren has done to her father. She explained that although her character is "meticulous", her revenge will "come out in different ways to how she anticipated". She confirmed that there would be a lot of upcoming material for her character and that there would be "a lot of twists and turns from her and for her". Clements also said that Summer develops romantic feelings for Brody and when she discovers that Sienna, Brody's partner, is having an affair with Warren, she plots to expose them. Clements explained that Summer has two motivations for exposing them; wanting them to take ownership of their actions and wanting to get close to Brody. She added that Brody not being with Sienna means she can develop their relationship "without Sienna being in the way". Summer takes photographs of Sienna and Warren together and posts them through Brody's letterbox; he ends their relationship and finds Summer is there "to mend his broken heart". She tells Brody that she wants to have sex with him with no strings attached, which he agrees to. Summer then brags to Sienna about having had sex with Brody. Summer begins to "dream of a future" with Brody and makes an "ally" out of Brody's best friend Damon Kinsella (Jacob Roberts), who she believes will influence Brody to get with her.

After Cormac dies, Summer learns that Brody initiated the attack and was a bystander. Clements stated that Summer "feels the most attacked" by Brody's involvement, since he has "lied to her face and manipulated her". As she feels Brody's involvement with Cormac's death is "more personal" than that of Warren and Felix, she begins to target him. Hollyoaks producers then revealed that there would be a shock shooting caused by Summer. Clements found out about the shooting just after she had been cast as Summer, as she had a meeting with the producers who outlined the plot details to her. After being sent "into complete meltdown", she finds a gun. Attempting to shoot Brody in the night, she accidentally shoots Sienna. On the misfire, Clements said that Summer likely feels regret rather than guilt. She explained that Summer's wish for revenge is still there and that she is annoyed that the shooting did not "exact in the way that she wanted it to". Clements felt that the shock shooting would be interesting for Summer since it shows her to be "out of control". Clements added that Summer uses Sienna's shooting to "manipulate things again". Summer feels she has to "lie low" and "deflect from the reality of what's happened by putting blame elsewhere" in order to carry out the rest of her revenge. Clements felt that viewers would be able to clearly see Summer's manipulation skills in the aftermath of the shooting, since she "tries to blame it on everything possible to try and cover up the facts". Clements explained Summer's thought process as: "Ah, what do I do know, and how do I make this situation work for me and how can I manipulate it even further?" After the shooting, Summer continues "her quest for vengeance" by plotting to make Brody fall in love with her and then "destroy his life".

=== Bond with Sienna Blake ===
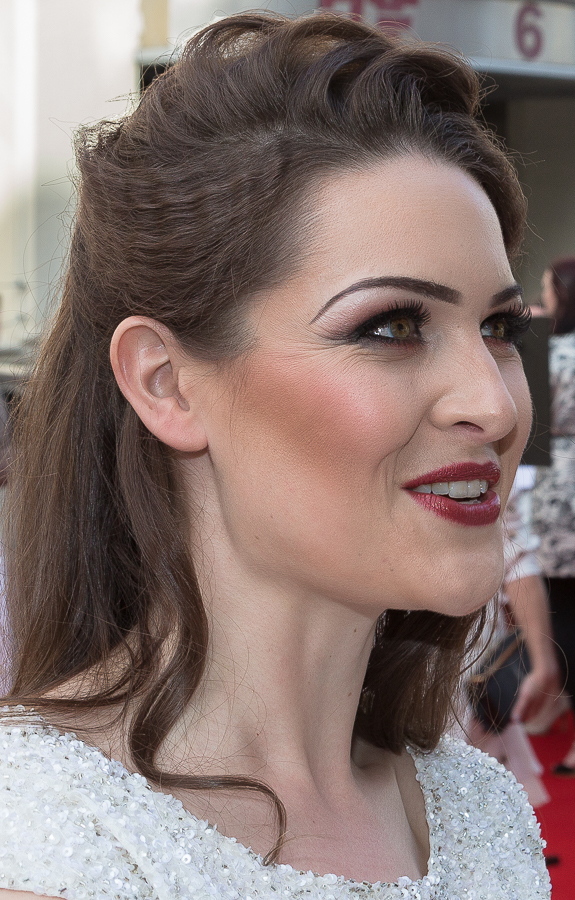
Anna Passey portrays Sienna Blake, Summer's "frenemy".

Upon the casting announcement, it was confirmed that Summer would act as a "frenemy" for Sienna in scenes that would see her give Sienna "a run for her money in life – and maybe love". Actress Clements stated in an interview with Digital Spy that fans of Sienna could see the similarity Summer has to her, but Sienna cannot see it. Clements found it interesting to have her character work with Sienna since the two "going head-to-head" would be "a pretty equal playing field". Summer tries to befriend Sienna, but she does not reciprocate Summer's friendly advances. Passey, who portrays Sienna, explained that her character "doesn't take kindly to Summer trying to be her mate". However, after the pair become trapped in Sienna's flat together, Sienna "realises she and Summer do have more in common than she thought". Summer opens up to her and makes her believe that they can be friends. However, she then kisses Sienna, telling her that their kiss is as close as she will get to kissing Brody. The "glimpse of her true colours" makes Sienna want to expose Summer; when she does, Passey explained that her character goes too far and looks like a jealous ex. Sienna then befriends Summer in an attempt to find out more about her life to get Brody back. Sienna invites Summer to her house and drugs her drink so that she can seduce Brody while Summer is unconscious. Sienna is arrested for the drugging but is surprised when Summer drops the charges. Summer is "delighted in Sienna's unexpectedly dark behaviour" and tells her that if she is in prison, she will never get to kiss her again.

Metro wrote that Summer comes to respect and admire Sienna and that after being "entangled in heated rivalry", Summer may be developing romantic feelings for Sienna. They also suggested that Summer would ensure Sienna is single so that Summer can have her to herself. Summer learns that Sienna is going on a date; she deletes the text from her date and attends the date herself, pretending to be Sienna. The irony of her plan was noted by Johnathan Hughes of Radio Times, who compared the scenes to when Sienna pretended to be Nancy Osborne (Jessica Fox) years prior to the storyline. Digital Spy confirmed that after months of the pair being rivals, a twist would see Summer become "infatuated" with Sienna. Clements echoed their comments whilst speaking to Inside Soap. She said that Summer is "consumed by Sienna" and "wants to be [her] everything". Clements said that despite having shown no attraction to Summer to date, her character believes that they could work as a romantic pairing. She furthered her point, explaining that Summer sees something in Sienna that she has never seen in anybody before. This is due to whatever bad things she has done, Summer knows that Sienna has done the same or worse, which is "really intriguing and exciting" for Summer. Clements described Sienna as a "kindred spirit" for Summer.

In May 2021, Summer and Sienna have a confrontational scene. Summer explains her feelings for Sienna, who replies that she hates Summer. However, Summer is "relentless" and affirms that Sienna does feel romantically for her. Summer explains the similarity between their dark qualities and how nobody understands them both, dubbing them "two twisted unlovable souls". Sienna then pulls Summer in for a long kiss and is shocked at her own actions afterwards. Clements enjoyed filming the scenes with Passey and looked forward to receiving the scripts each week. Herself and Passey would have "great fun" on set talking about the scripts. In an interview with Stephen Patterson of the Metro, Clements promised that would still be "lots of twists and turns" after the kiss with Sienna. She also said that she has to take everything "one minute at a time" since Summer "could just twist at any moment" and "ruffle feathers".

Sienna later learns Summer has been gaslighting her into questioning Brody. Passey was asked by Patterson if there was still potential for the pair to reconcile their romance, to which she said "never say never". Passey felt that Sienna sees Summer for who she really is and that she understands Summer's motives behind all of her destructive actions. She admitted that Summer has done terrible things to her and her loved ones, but felt that her own character could always understand why Summer had behaved in this way. Following Clements' exit, she echoed Passey's comments about the potential for the couple to reconcile. Clements said that with Brody dead, Summer can see a future with Sienna due to feeling an affinity to her. She acknowledged that the journey for Summer and Sienna would be a long one, but that it could be possible for them.

=== Imprisonment and exit ===
After Liberty Savage (Jessamy Stoddart) discovers Summer's plan to take revenge on Brody, she promises not to tell anyone. Before she can escape, Summer kidnaps her and keeps her locked up in her refrigerated storeroom outside of the village. She convinces Brody to marry her while she is still missing, but at the ceremony, she tells Brody that she cannot marry him. She tries to convince Sienna that Brody is responsible for Liberty's disappearance and that he has murdered her. Sienna initially believes her but realises that Brody is innocent, while still acting like she believes Summer. In a trailer for the soap's mid-2021 storylines, scenes showed Summer continue her "path of revenge" by kidnapping Sienna. The soap confirmed that Summer's revenge arc would come to a head with an arrest, a spiked drink and a gunshot. The scenes involved Liberty arriving in time to save Sienna and shooting Summer. They leave Summer's body while they react to the events, but when they return, she has gone, and it is confirmed that Summer is alive and has escaped. Passey was glad that the story had not ended there, as she did not want it to end, especially with Summer's death.

Summer returns in September, with her scenes being advertised as life-threatening. A false sighting of Summer is reported to the police, resulting in Sienna and Brody being transported to a safehouse. Summer informs the pair that she plans on murdering Sienna to get back at Brody, but he informs Summer that he will report himself and Warren to the police for the part they played in Cormac's murder. Warren overhears the plan and runs Brody over with his car, killing him. Sienna is adamant that Summer is responsible for his murder and informs the police. Summer denies the accusations which infuriates Sienna, but she is informed that Summer will be imprisoned for her other crimes. On 17 September 2021, Metro confirmed that Clements would be departing from Hollyoaks. Clements confirmed that Summer's exit would involve her staying in prison for her crimes. She revealed that she was contracted for 12 months, and since that contract had finished, she would be leaving the soap. She was happy that her exit had been left open for a possible return, hinting that Summer could return following her release and redeem herself. Clements expressed her intention to return to Hollyoaks eventually, but confirmed that it would not be imminent. She accredited this to the heavy filming schedule that appearing on a soap involves, which she felt had been a learning curve for her as an actress.

Clements was asked if Summer feels robbed of being able to kill Brody herself. She replied that Summer feels angry for feeling as though she failed her father, but is glad that justice has been served without having to do it herself. She opined that Summer may not "have it in her to do it" herself. The actress also voiced her wishes for Summer to be redeemed. She explained that with the right amount of reason and development, Summer could be redeemed in the same way Passey's character Sienna was. Clements also felt that in order for Summer to be redeemed, she would have to realise that Cormac was a racist abuser. She added that if Summer was able to see Cormac in his true light, she "would have a very different take on the way things have panned out".

== Reception ==
For her role as Summer, Clements was nominated for the Newcomer award at the 26th National Television Awards. Clements was also nominated for three awards at the 2021 Inside Soap Awards; Best Newcomer, Best Villain and Best Partnership, the latter being a shared nomination with Passey. At the 2022 British Soap Awards, she was nominated for Villain of the Year.

Paul Fogarty of HITC wrote that Clements had "made a huge impact on Hollyoaks" and that her character had been "an explosive presence" from her arrival. He also wrote that her story arc involving framing Warren for shooting Sienna was "captivating". Fogarty noted Clements' truncated left forearm, appreciating that her disability "has never been the focus of her character", but instead the drama she is involved in. Viewers of the soap also praised this. Patterson (Metro) wrote that Clements had "well and truly made her mark as Hollyoaks' resident schemer" and that despite being new to the soap, she had "made herself right at home" by May 2021. Patterson also described Summer and Sienna's "steamy" kissing scenes as a "truly shocking and unexpected moment" and noted that viewers of the show were excited to see the pair progress as love interests. Writing for the Manchester Evening News, Katie Fitzgerald acknowledged the impact Clements had made on Hollyoaks, describing her as a "minxy new villain" who is "captivating audiences". After news of her departure was announced, Patterson joked that he was crying about Summer leaving the soap and felt that Hollyoaks would not be the same.

== See also ==
- List of Hollyoaks characters (2020)
- List of LGBT characters in soap operas
- List of soap opera villains
