= British Soap Award for Villain of the Year =

Annual British TV award

- Country: United Kingdom
- First award: 1999
- Final award: 2025

Highlights
- Most awards: Connor McIntyre (2)

The British Soap Award for Villain of the Year was an award presented annually by the British Soap Awards. Upon its inception, the award was voted for by a panel, until in 2006, it opened as a publicly voted category. This remained until 2014. However, in 2023, it was once again opened as a public vote. Coronation Street is the most awarded soap in the category, with nine wins. The final winner of the award was EastEnders actor Navin Chowdhry.

== Winners and nominees ==
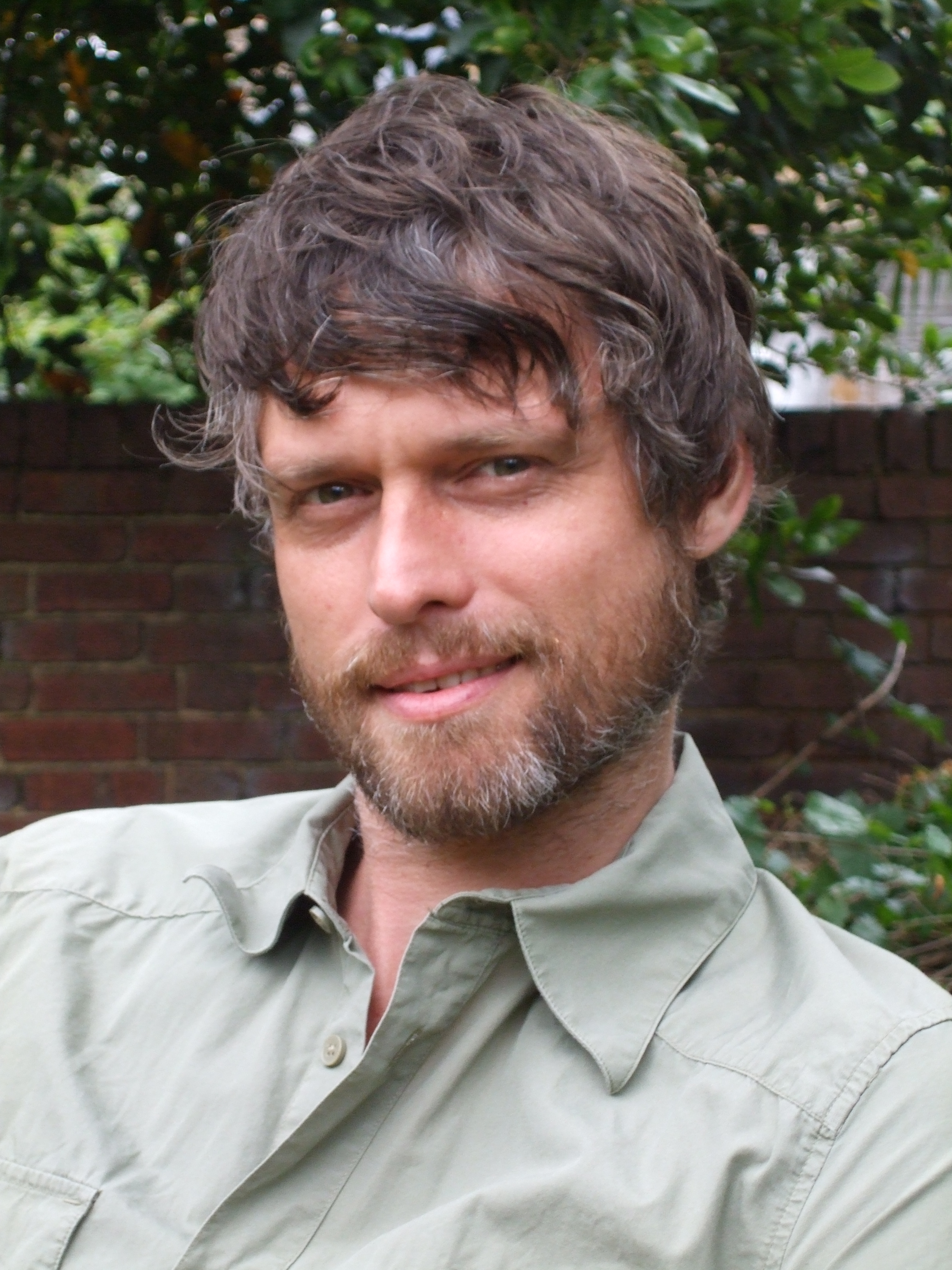
1999 winner Stephen Billington.

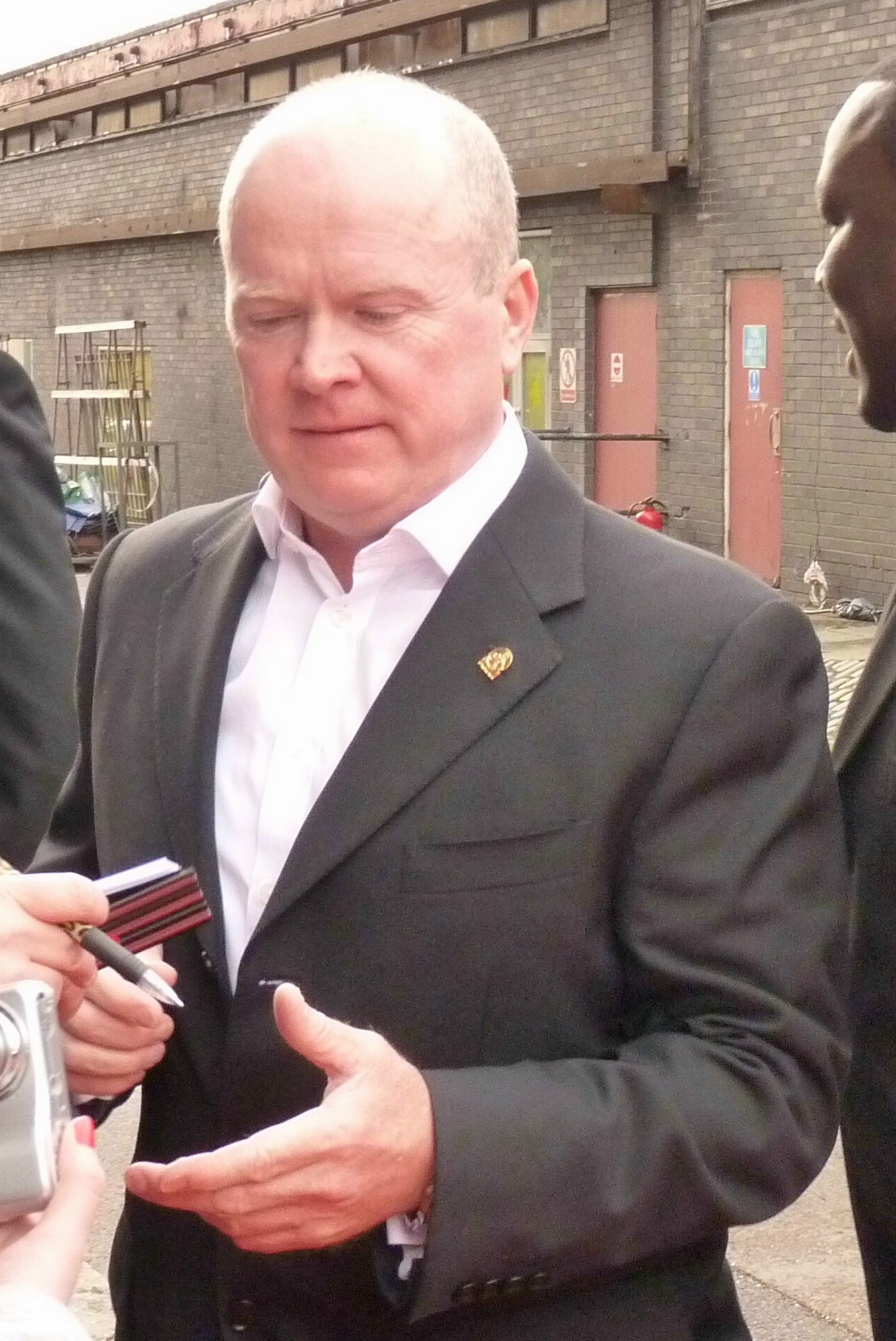
2001 winner Steve McFadden.

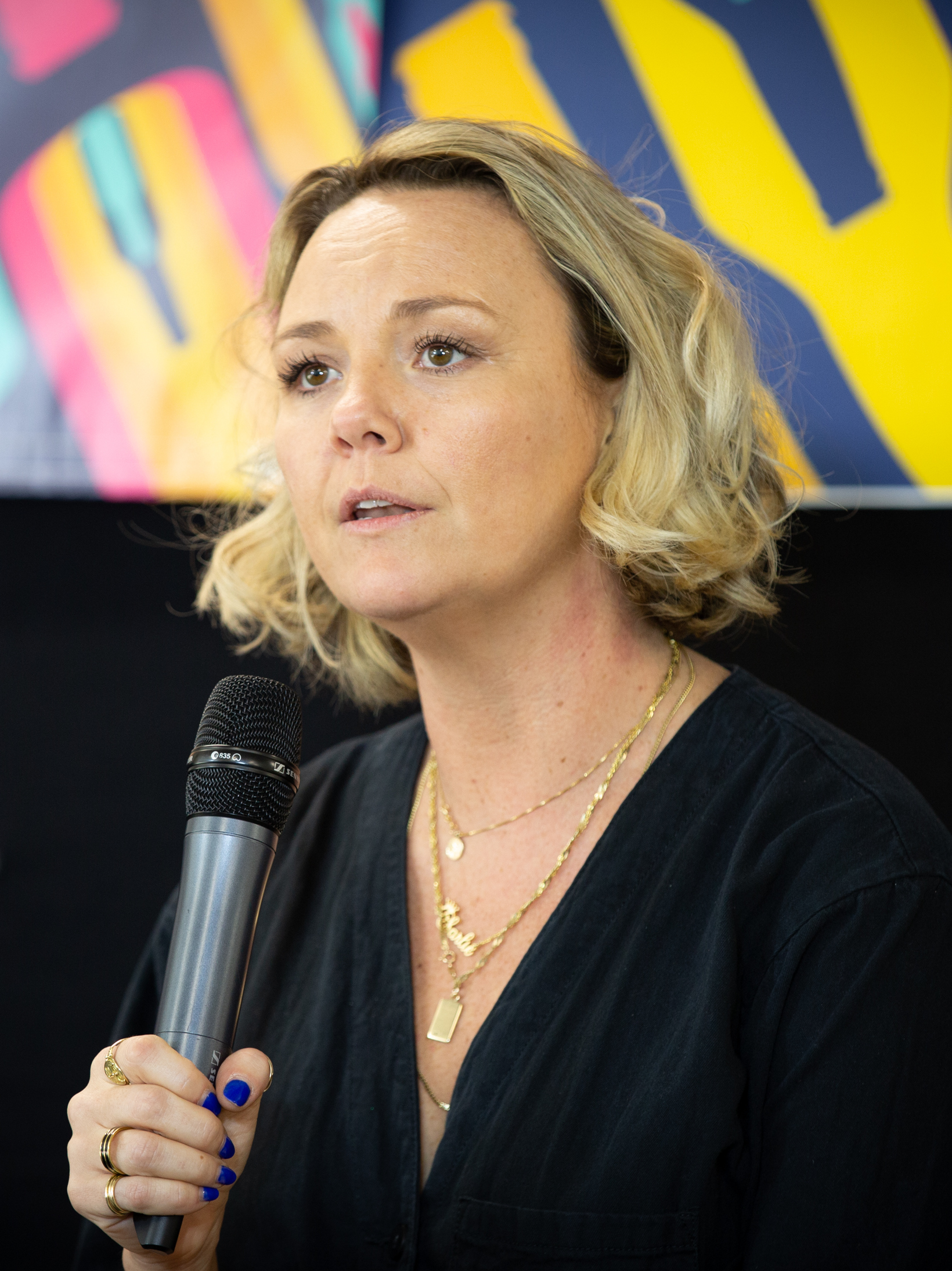
2004 winner Charlie Brooks.

Winners and nominees from 1999–2004
Year	Actor	Role	Soap opera
1999	Stephen Billington	Greg Kelly	Coronation Street
1999	Martin Kemp	Steve Owen	EastEnders
1999	Ross Kemp	Grant Mitchell	EastEnders
1999	Claire King	Kim Tate	Emmerdale
2000	Martin Kemp	Steve Owen	EastEnders
2001	Steve McFadden	Phil Mitchell	EastEnders
2001	Martin Kemp	Steve Owen	EastEnders
2002	Alex Ferns	Trevor Morgan	EastEnders
2002	Steve McFadden	Phil Mitchell	EastEnders
2002	Miles Anderson	George Shackleford	Family Affairs
2002	David Easter	Pete Callan	Family Affairs
2002	Tina Hall	Claire Toomey	Family Affairs
2003	Brian Capron	Richard Hillman	Coronation Street
2003	Alex Ferns	Trevor Morgan	EastEnders
2003	Steve McFadden	Phil Mitchell	EastEnders
2004	Charlie Brooks	Janine Butcher	EastEnders
2004	Kate Ford	Tracy Barlow	Coronation Street
2004	Peter Amory	Chris Tate	Emmerdale
2004	Henry Luxemburg	Toby Mills	Hollyoaks

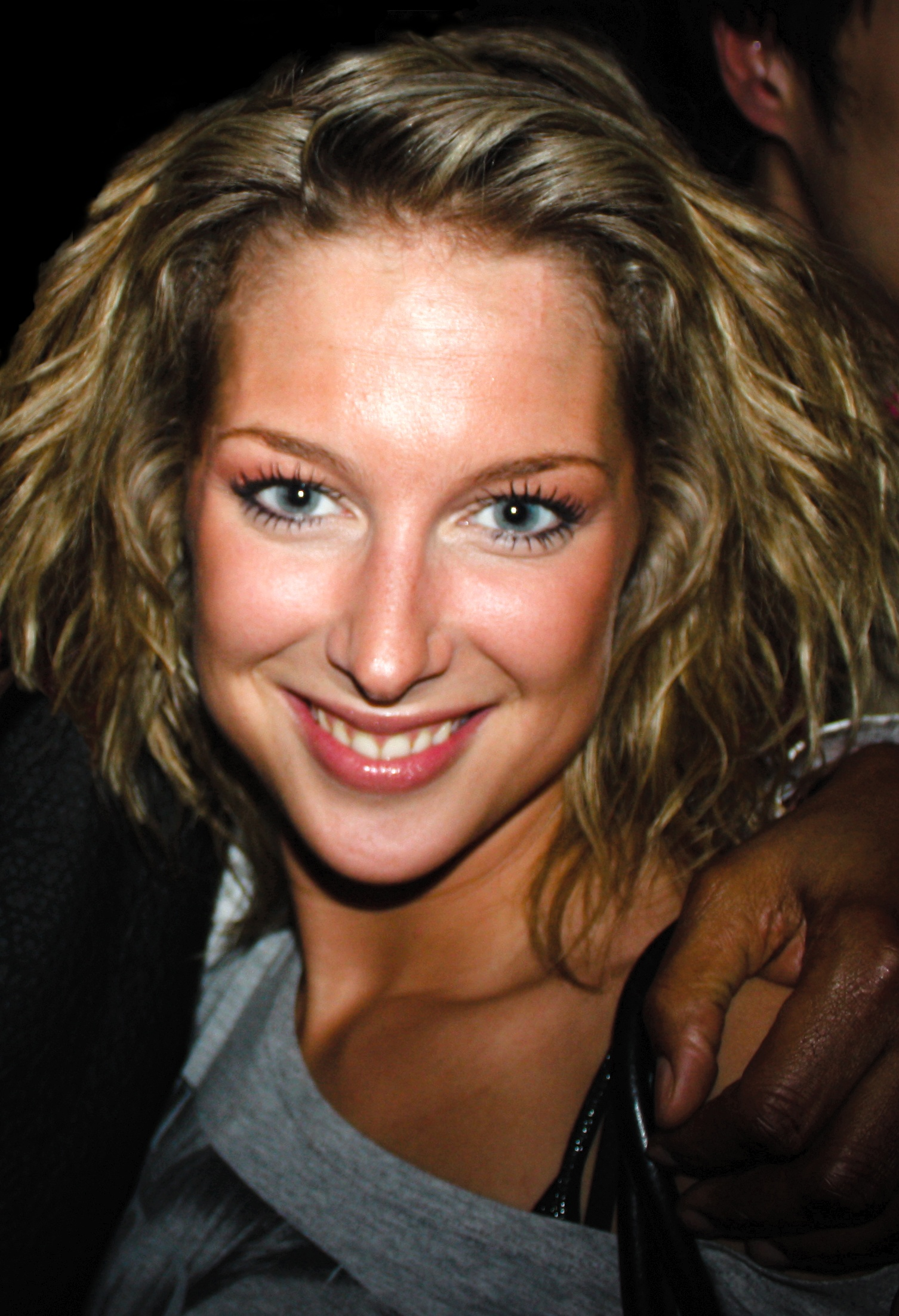
2007 winner Gemma Bissix.

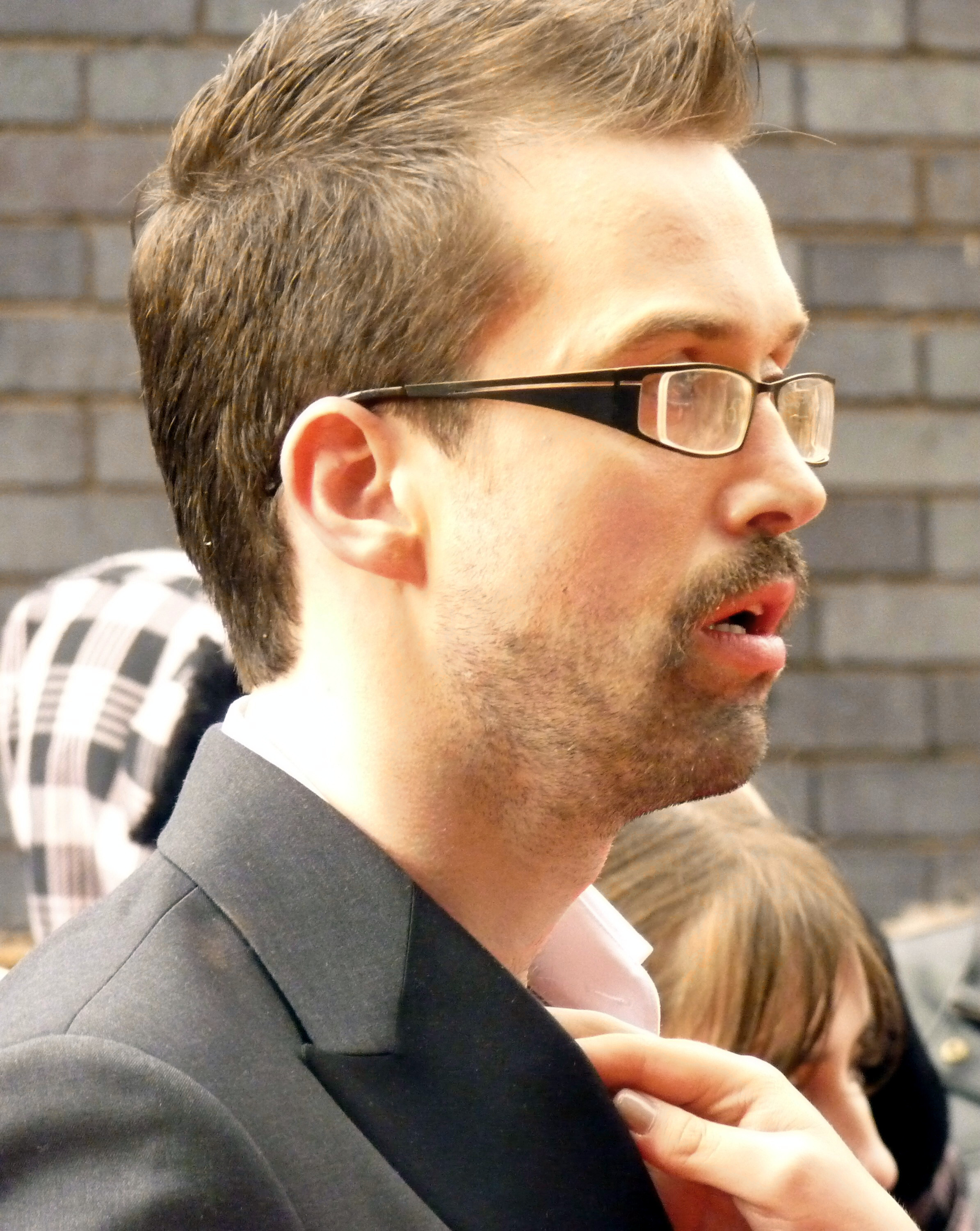
2011 winner Emmett J. Scanlan.

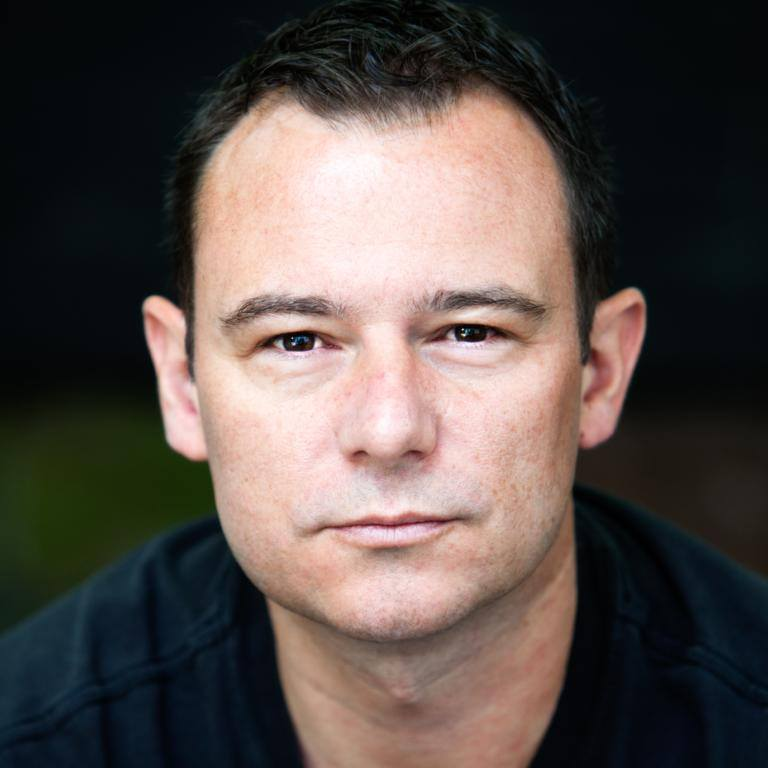
2012 winner Andrew Lancel.

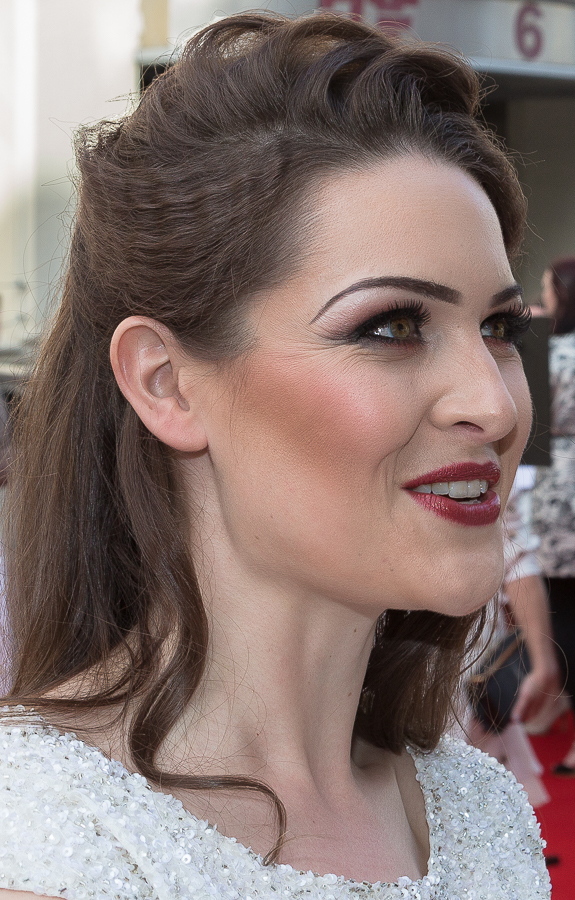
2014 winner Anna Passey.

Winners and nominees from 2005–2014
Year	Winner	Shortlisted (Note: These performers were voted through to the shortlist round.)	Longlisted (Note: These performers were unsuccessful in being voted through to the shortlist.)
2005	Sasha Behar (Maya Sharma in Coronation Street)	Bill Ward (Charlie Stubbs in Coronation Street); Tracy-Ann Oberman (Chrissie Watts in EastEnders); Lorraine Chase (Steph Stokes in Emmerdale)	Kate Ford (Tracy Barlow in Coronation Street); Sean Arnold (Harry Fisher in Doctors); Mandana Jones (Ria Ford in Doctors); Keeley Mills (Chloe Pearce in Doctors); Leslie Grantham (Den Watts in EastEnders); Billy Murray (Johnny Allen in EastEnders)
2006	Billy Murray (Johnny Allen in EastEnders)	Kate Ford (Tracy Barlow in Coronation Street); Bill Ward (Charlie Stubbs in Coronation Street); Warren Brown (Andy Holt in Hollyoaks)	Bradley Walsh (Danny Baldwin in Coronation Street); Daniel Anthony (Lex Keavey in Doctors); Lesley Harcourt (Charlotte Roberts in Doctors); Jo-Anne Stockham ("The Mantis" in Doctors); Steve McFadden (Phil Mitchell in EastEnders); Tracy-Ann Oberman (Chrissie Watts in EastEnders); Nick Brimble (Terence Turner in Emmerdale); Matt Healy (Matthew King in Emmerdale); Patsy Kensit (Sadie King in Emmerdale); Chris Fountain (Justin Burton in Hollyoaks); Louis Tamone (Sam Owen in Hollyoaks)
2007	Gemma Bissix (Clare Devine in Hollyoaks)	Kate Ford (Tracy Barlow in Coronation Street); Sophie Thompson (Stella Crawford in EastEnders); Jamie Lomas (Warren Fox in Hollyoaks)	Jack P. Shepherd (David Platt in Coronation Street); Pavel Douglas (Leo Jackson in Doctors); Anthony Hunt (Ian Carter in Doctors); Robert Kazinsky (Sean Slater in EastEnders); Lee Ross (Owen Turner in EastEnders); Kenneth Farrington (Tom King in Emmerdale); Jeff Hordley (Cain Dingle in Emmerdale); Linda Thorson (Rosemary King in Emmerdale)
2008	Jack P. Shepherd (David Platt in Coronation Street)	Sophie Thompson (Stella Crawford in EastEnders); Jake Wood (Max Branning in EastEnders); Barry Sloane (Niall Rafferty in Hollyoaks)	Helen Flanagan (Rosie Webster in Coronation Street); Alison King (Carla Connor in Coronation Street); Louise Bangay (Alex Haverley in Doctors); Ken Bones (Tyrrel in Doctors); Catherine Hamilton (Ocean Kennedy in Doctors); Robert Kazinsky (Sean Slater in EastEnders); Joseph Gilgun (Eli Dingle in Emmerdale); Matt Healy (Matthew King in Emmerdale); Nicola Wheeler (Nicola King in Emmerdale); Jamie Lomas (Warren Fox in Hollyoaks); Kieron Richardson (Ste Hay in Hollyoaks)
2009	Gray O'Brien (Tony Gordon in Coronation Street)	Chris Coghill (Tony King in EastEnders); Larry Lamb (Archie Mitchell in EastEnders); Barry Sloane (Niall Rafferty in Hollyoaks)	Graeme Hawley (John Stape in Coronation Street); Mikey North (Gary Windass in Coronation Street); Gavin Bell (Davey Lowe in Doctors); James Gaddas (Jack Harcourt in Doctors); Badria Timimi (Layla Darwish in Doctors); John Altman (Nick Cotton in EastEnders); Matt Healy (Matthew King in Emmerdale); Paul McEwan (Shane Doyle in Emmerdale); Nicola Wheeler (Nicola King in Emmerdale); Jamie Lomas (Warren Fox in Hollyoaks); Kieron Richardson (Ste Hay in Hollyoaks)
2010	Larry Lamb (Archie Mitchell in EastEnders)	Gray O'Brien (Tony Gordon in Coronation Street); Don Gilet (Lucas Johnson in EastEnders); Siân Reeves (Sally Spode in Emmerdale)	Robert Beck (Jimmy Dockerson in Coronation Street); Greg Wood (Rick Neelan in Coronation Street); Debbie Chazen (Sissy Juggins in Doctors); Sam Heughan (Scott Nielson in Doctors); Philip McGough (Charlie Bradfield in Doctors); Chris Coghill (Tony King in EastEnders); Jeff Hordley (Cain Dingle in Emmerdale); Lyndon Ogbourne (Nathan Wylde in Emmerdale); Joel Goonan (Gaz Bennett in Hollyoaks); Lydia Kelly (Lydia Hart in Hollyoaks); Jamie Lomas (Warren Fox in Hollyoaks)
2011	Emmett J. Scanlan (Brendan Brady in Hollyoaks)	Kate Ford (Tracy Barlow in Coronation Street); Charlie Brooks (Janine Butcher in EastEnders); Don Gilet (Lucas Johnson in EastEnders)	Graeme Hawley (John Stape in Coronation Street); Paula Lane (Kylie Platt in Coronation Street); Emma Stansfield (Lesley Hammond in Doctors); Matilda Ziegler (Susan Oakley in Doctors); Philip McGough (Charlie Bradfield in Doctors); Glynis Barber (Glenda Mitchell in EastEnders); Jeff Hordley (Cain Dingle in Emmerdale); Michael McKell (Nick Henshall in Emmerdale); Lyndon Ogbourne (Nathan Wylde in Emmerdale); Jamie Lomas (Warren Fox in Hollyoaks); Jeff Rawle (Silas Blissett in Hollyoaks)
2012	Andrew Lancel (Frank Foster in Coronation Street)	Ace Bhatti (Yusef Khan in EastEnders); Joshua Pascoe (Ben Mitchell in EastEnders); Jeff Rawle (Silas Blissett in Hollyoaks)	Kate Ford (Tracy Barlow in Coronation Street); Natalie Gumede (Kirsty Soames in Coronation Street); James Larkin (Harrison Kellor in Doctors); Marian McLoughlin (Marina Bonnaire in Doctors); Laurence Saunders (Trevor Waterhouse in Doctors); Steve McFadden (Phil Mitchell in EastEnders); Jeff Hordley (Cain Dingle in Emmerdale); Tom Lister (Carl King in Emmerdale); Jason Merrells (Declan Macey in Emmerdale); Jamie Lomas (Warren Fox in Hollyoaks); Emmett J. Scanlan (Brendan Brady in Hollyoaks)
2013	Natalie Gumede (Kirsty Soames in Coronation Street)	Nigel Havers (Lewis Archer in Coronation Street); Jamie Foreman (Derek Branning in EastEnders); Dominic Power (Cameron Murray in Emmerdale); Emmett J. Scanlan (Brendan Brady in Hollyoaks)	John Michie (Karl Munro in Coronation Street); Sophie Abelson (Cherry Malone in Doctors); Sam Barriscale (Andrei Mitkov in Doctors); Gary Lucy (Danny Pennant in EastEnders); Steve McFadden (Phil Mitchell in EastEnders); Tom Lister (Carl King in Emmerdale); Charley Webb (Debbie Dingle in Emmerdale); James Atherton (Will Savage in Hollyoaks); Joseph Thompson (Doctor Browning in Hollyoaks)
2014	Anna Passey (Sienna Blake in Hollyoaks)	Charlie Brooks (Janine Butcher in EastEnders); Dominic Power (Cameron Murray in Emmerdale); Jesse Birdsall (Fraser Black in Hollyoaks); Greg Wood (Trevor Royle in Hollyoaks)	Chris Gascoyne (Peter Barlow in Coronation Street); Connor McIntyre (Pat Phelan in Coronation Street); Jack P. Shepherd (David Platt in Coronation Street); Mark Cameron (Tom in Doctors); Neil Haigh (Gus Harper in Doctors); Elisabeth Dermot Walsh (Zara Carmichael in Doctors); Daniel Coonan (Carl White in EastEnders); Cornell John (Sam James in EastEnders); Emma Atkins (Charity Dingle in Emmerdale); Michael Parr (Ross Barton in Emmerdale)

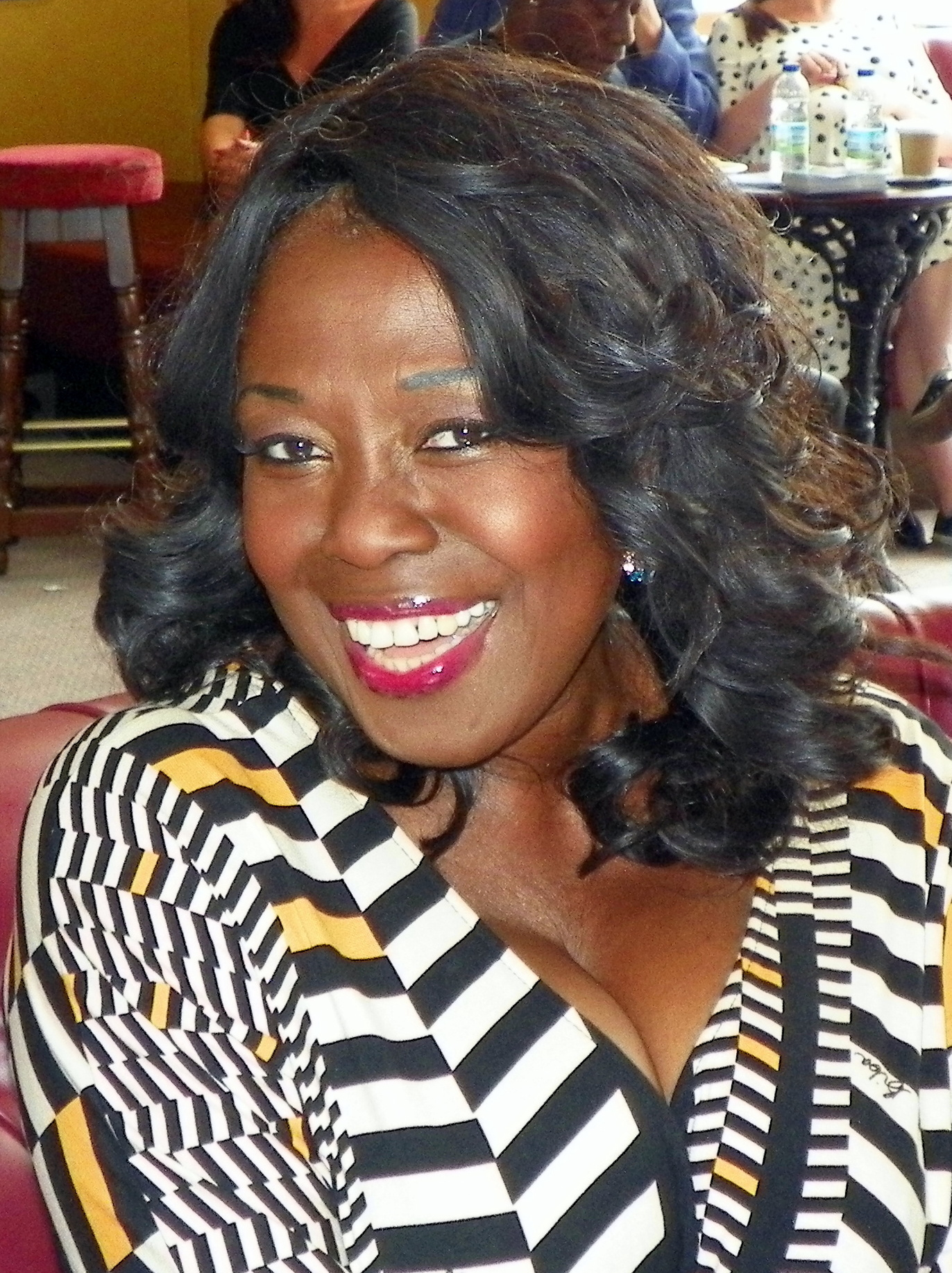
2016 nominee Ellen Thomas.

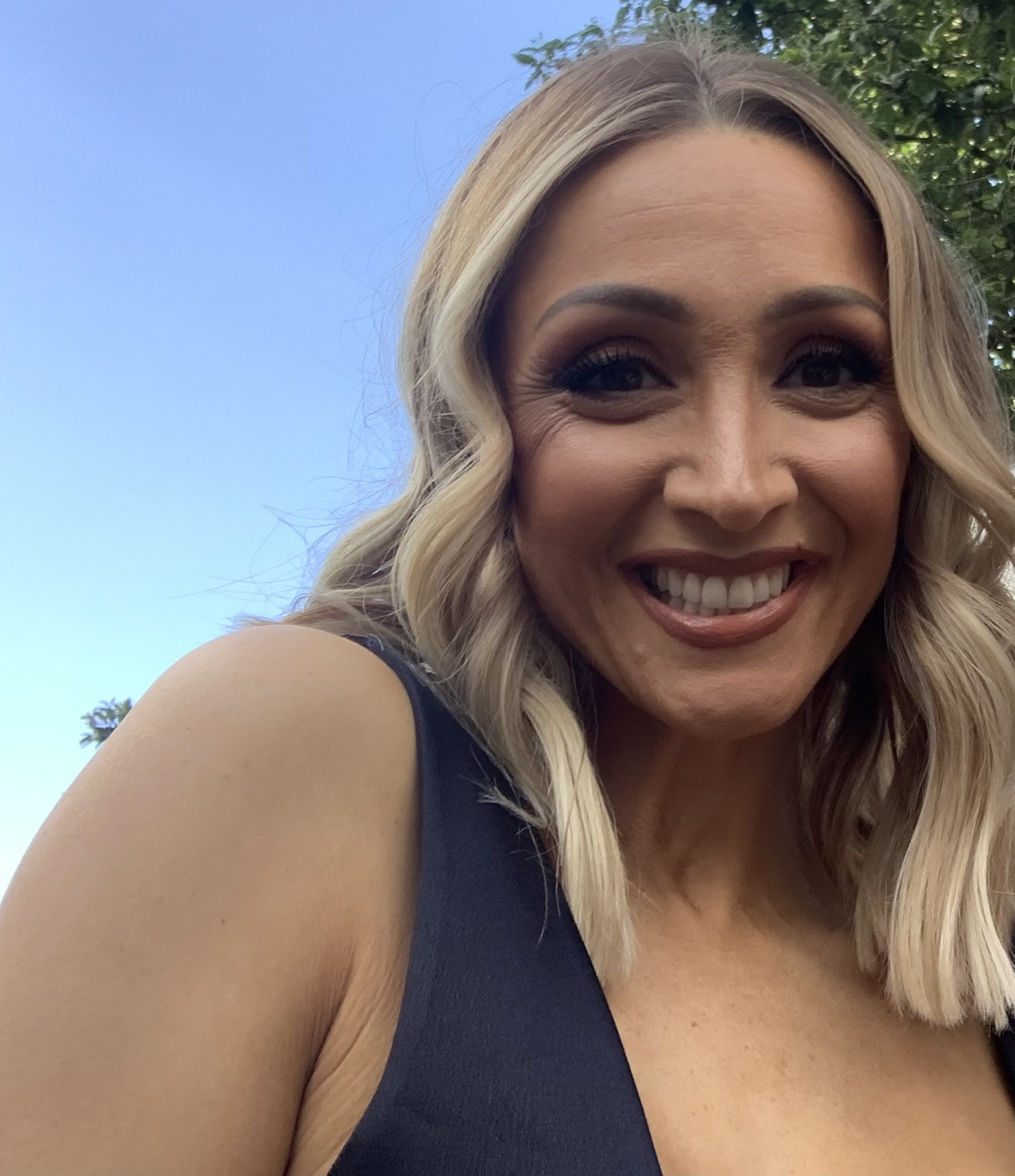
2017 winner Lucy-Jo Hudson.

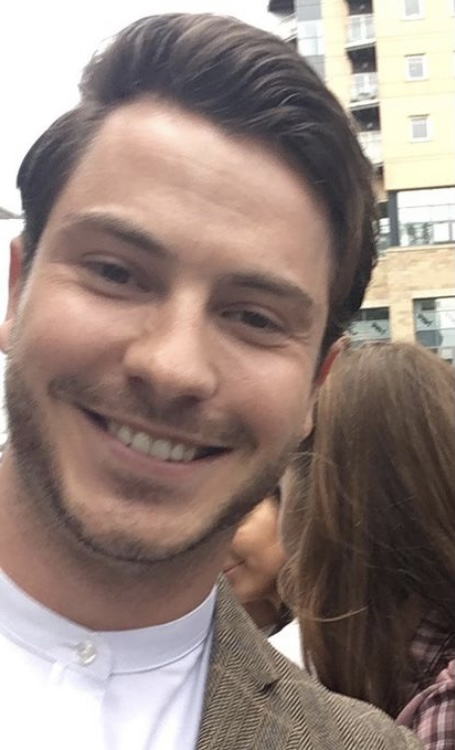
2022 nominee Toby-Alexander Smith.

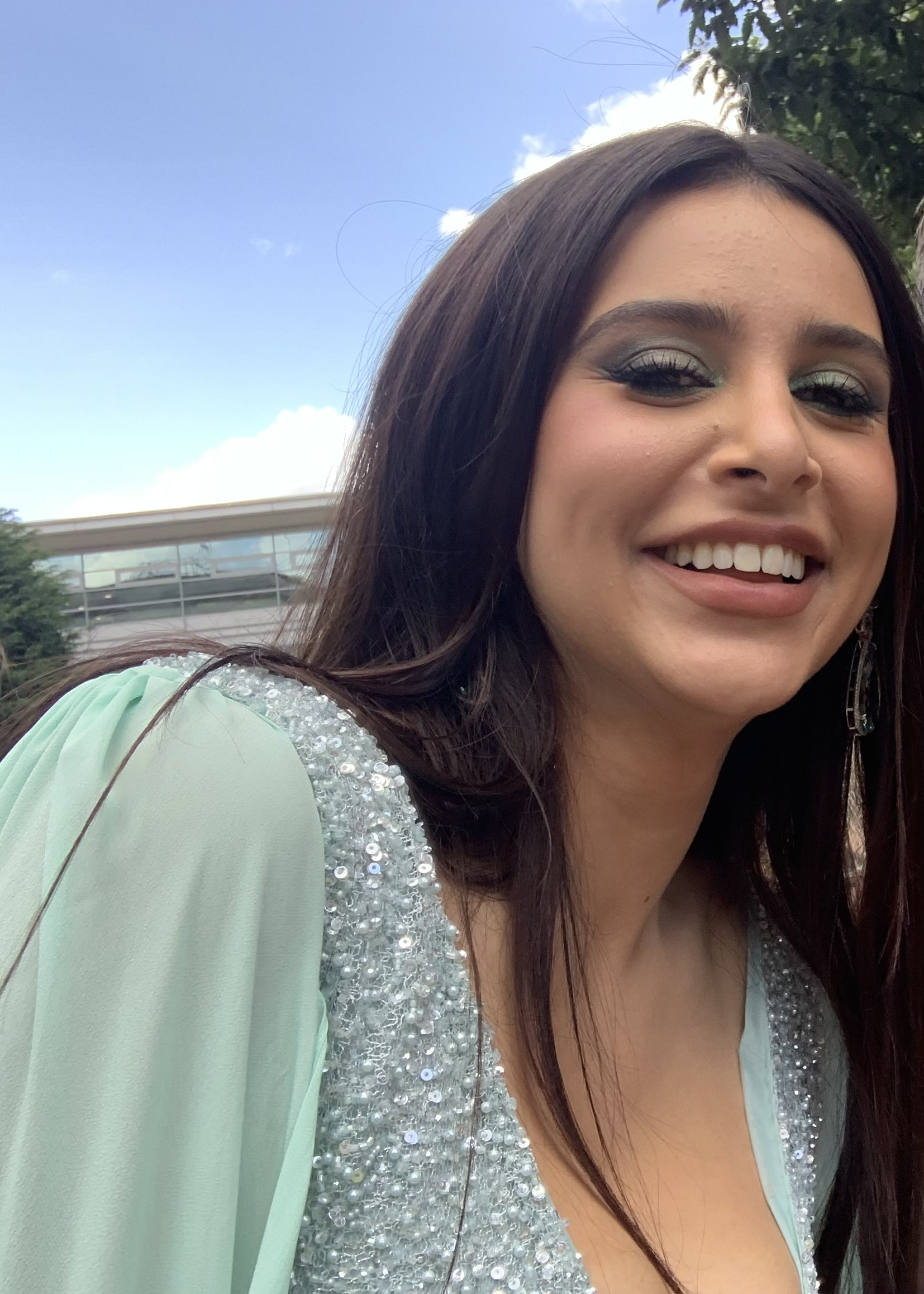
2022 nominee Paige Sandhu.

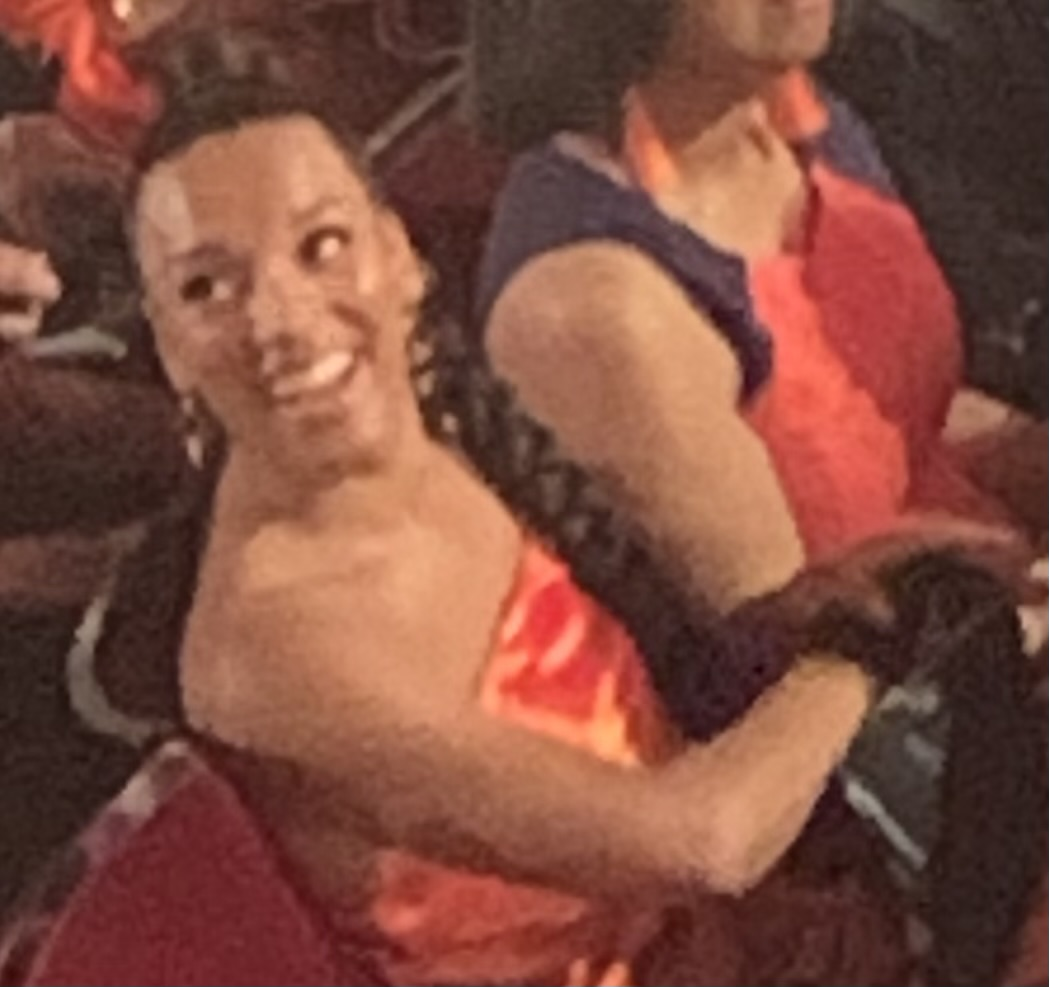
2022 and 2023 nominee Laura White.

Winners and nominees from 2015–present
Year	Actor	Role	Soap opera
2015	Jeremy Sheffield	Patrick Blake	Hollyoaks
2015	Sean Ward	Callum Logan	Coronation Street
2015	Daniel Schutzmann	Franc Christophe	Doctors
2015	John Altman	Nick Cotton	EastEnders
2015	Ryan Hawley	Robert Sugden	Emmerdale
2016	Connor McIntyre	Pat Phelan	Coronation Street
2016	Adam Astill	Anthony Harker	Doctors
2016	Ellen Thomas	Claudette Hubbard	EastEnders
2016	Ryan Hawley	Robert Sugden	Emmerdale
2016	Sophie Austin	Lindsey Butterfield	Hollyoaks
2017	Lucy-Jo Hudson	Rhiannon Davis	Doctors
2017	Connor McIntyre	Pat Phelan	Coronation Street
2017	Jake Wood	Max Branning	EastEnders
2017	Gillian Kearney	Emma Barton	Emmerdale
2017	Persephone Swales-Dawson	Nico Blake	Hollyoaks
2018	Connor McIntyre	Pat Phelan	Coronation Street
2018	Ryan Prescott	Liam Slade	Doctors
2018	Jake Wood	Max Branning	EastEnders
2018	Gillian Kearney	Emma Barton	Emmerdale
2018	David Easter	Mac Nightingale	Hollyoaks
2019	Nathan Sussex	Buster Smith	Hollyoaks
2019	Greg Wood	Rick Neelan	Coronation Street
2019	Matthew Chambers	Daniel Granger	Doctors
2019	Ricky Champ	Stuart Highway	EastEnders
2019	Claire King	Kim Tate	Emmerdale
2022	Maximus Evans	Corey Brent	Coronation Street
2022	Laura White	Princess Buchanan	Doctors
2022	Toby-Alexander Smith	Gray Atkins	EastEnders
2022	Paige Sandhu	Meena Jutla	Emmerdale
2022	Rhiannon Clements	Summer Ranger	Hollyoaks
2023	Aaron Thiara	Ravi Gulati	EastEnders
2023	Todd Boyce	Stephen Reid	Coronation Street
2023	Laura White	Princess Buchanan	Doctors
2023	Michael Wildman	Al Chapman	Emmerdale
2023	Angus Castle-Doughty	Eric Foster	Hollyoaks
2025	Navin Chowdhry	Nish Panesar	EastEnders
2025	Calum Lill	Joel Deering	Coronation Street
2025	Ned Porteous	Joe Tate	Emmerdale
2025	Tyler Conti	Abe Fielding	Hollyoaks

== Wins and nominations by soap ==
Soap opera	Wins	Shortlist nominations (Note: These nominations did not result in a win.)
Coronation Street	9	13
EastEnders	8	25
Hollyoaks	5	15
Doctors	1	6
Emmerdale	0	14
Family Affairs	0	3
