= Smug Roberts =

British comedian

- Born: Andy Robert Wilkinson; 1960 (age 65–66); Harpurhey, Manchester, England
- Other name: Smug Roberts

Comedy career
- Years active: 1995–present
- Medium: Stand up, television, radio
- Genres: Observational comedy, anecdotes
- Website: http://www.smugroberts.co.uk/

Andy Robert Wilkinson (born 1960), better known by his stage name of Smug Roberts, is an English stand up comedian and actor. Born in Harpurhey, Manchester, Wilkinson attended North Manchester High School for Boys before taking various jobs such as a relief pub landlord and the coach of a football team in Toronto, Ontario, Canada. He also ran a signwriting business for a time.

In 1995, he tried stand-up comedy for the first time at the Frog and Bucket comedy club, adopting the stage name "Smug Roberts"; the "smug" came from an event in his life where people teased him for being a "smug bastard" and the "Roberts" was adapted from his middle name. Caroline Aherne and her then-husband Peter Hook watched his set and she put him in contact with an agent. Six weeks later, Roberts performed his first one-man gig. In 1998, he released the novelty anthem "Meat Pie, Sausage Roll (Come on England, Gi's a Goal)" as "Grandad Roberts", both the character and song (originally a jingle referencing Oldham Athletic A.F.C. rather than England) stemming from his afternoon radio show on Key 103. At the end of 1999, he compered the re-opened Embassy Club, on the invitation of Bernard Manning's son Bernard Jr. On his appointment, City Life comedy editor Marissa Burgess said, "I personally don't hold with Bernard Manning's comedy, so changing hands to Smug Roberts I feel can only be a good thing."

In 2000, he headlined with Paul Merton and John Thomson at the opening night of the Manchester Comedy Store. His appearance there led to a role in the film 24 Hour Party People (2002). Roberts has also appeared on television, with roles in Cutting It, Buried and Cold Feet. He has appeared in every television production by Peter Kay, except for Max and Paddy's Road to Nowhere.

Between 2001–2004, Smug Roberts was part of the cast of the BBC Radio 4 sketch show, The In Crowd. The Manchester-based comedy also featured Kate Ward, Robin Ince and Helen Moon and is regularly repeated on BBC Radio 4 Extra.
