= Just Henry =

2011 television film

- Based on: Just Henry by Michelle Magorian
- Written by: Michael Chaplin
- Directed by: David Moore
- Starring: Josh Bolt; Elaine Cassidy; Dean Andrews; Sheila Hancock; Charlie May-Clark; Perry Millward; Barbara Flynn; John Henshaw
- Country of origin: United Kingdom
- Original language: English

Production
- Producers: Kate Bartlett; Myar Craig; Paul Frift
- Editor: Adam Recht
- Running time: 80 minutes
- Production company: ITV Studios

Original release
- Network: ITV
- Release: 18 December 2011

Just Henry is a 2011 television film by ITV based on the 2008 Costa Book Award novel, Just Henry by Michelle Magorian.

== Plot ==
Henry Dodge is a 15-year-old boy haunted by the tragic death of his father during the Second World War. Henry discovers, after being coached by his grandmother, that the father of a classmate was the man who murdered his own father. After a violent row resulting in disciplinary action from a pacifist teacher, Mrs Beaumont, and spurred by classmate Grace, Henry begrudgingly makes peace with the boy, Paul Jeffries, who (along with his mother) is treated as a pariah due to the belief that the elder Jeffries was a deserter during the Second World War. Whilst developing a photo taken of Grace during a group outing involving the three classmates, on a camera given to him by Mrs Beaumont, Henry spots a man who closely resembled the man he knew as his father, Joey.

Upon seeing the photo his pregnant mother, Maureen, passes out with shock. Henry begins to develop distrust for his grandmother, as it is implied that she was the driving force behind the eviction of Paul and his mother. While honoring his father at the gravesite, the man who appeared in the photograph approaches Henry and the father and son are reunited. Henry tells his mother and she responds with disbelief and exasperation, accusing Henry of lying. Maureen falls to the ground while leaving the room and instructs Henry to fetch Bill from work.

Later that night, Maureen chides Henry in her convalescence, pointing out that her new marriage would not be legal if the man he met were truly his father, that she would be guilty of the crime of bigamy and that the baby would be born a bastard. She instructs Henry to keep silent, but also to bring word to his father that she wishes to see him. The friendship between Grace and Henry begins to bloom into more romantic feelings with repeated trips to the cinema. Henry takes her to meet the man, who begins to show sinister motives. It is apparent upon Grace's intense questioning that Henry's father is a deserter who faked his own death, though he makes the claim that he was an amnesiac. Henry's devotion to the self-made cult of his father causes him to reject Grace and flee in anger.

Joey approaches the house and borrows a match from an unwitting Bill, who is headed to his night job, and then enters the house and attempts to reclaim his rights as husband and father. Maureen points out that Bill has been paying the rent for five years and is more of a father to Henry. Meanwhile, Henry is totally supportive of his father in defiance of his mother. Henry's grandmother hears the noise and comes downstairs to investigate, declaring it a miracle when she sees her son, who immediately leaves on supposedly urgent business.

The next morning, Henry's grandmother informs Bill over the breakfast table despite Maureen's protestations. Bill believes Maureen has hidden this information because she is ashamed that he is working class and poor. She assures him that this is not the case. Henry runs into his father on the street, who offers to take him under his wing in a nebulous, presumably nonexistent or illegal family business. Henry attempts to apologise to Grace, and Grace meets with Mrs Beaumont looking for advice on how to help Henry.

The entire family gathers to hash things out with Joey. Joey threatens police action against Maureen and Bill. Only the grandmother stands in favor of Joey's return. Henry begins to have flashbacks to his early childhood, wherein his father was abusing his mother after throwing Henry out in the rain; he rejects Joey and runs off into the rain to drown himself at the beach, believing he must be evil if his father is evil, too. Bill convinces Henry to come home, telling him he could have the most precious thing in the world, his mother's love, if he would only take it.

Henry meets with Grace where it is revealed to him that she and Mrs. Beaumont are working behind his back to discover the truth about his father. The police are involved and it is revealed the gifts that Henry's biological father had given him were stolen from a food depot in another town, and that they had been attempting to apprehend his father (under the pseudonym Walter Briggs) for some time for these and other crimes including stolen ration coupons. The police ask Maureen permission to exhume and examine the body in Joey's grave. It is revealed that the body is that of Ronald Jeffries, Paul's absentee father.

Returning from a school pageant presented by Grace and Paul and Henry, wherein Henry reveals some of these heartfelt lessons, the family discovers that the house has been ransacked by Joey, who with blessings of the grandmother is stealing all of their possessions and furniture. Joey pistol-whips Bill and abducts Maureen and Henry, declaring his hatred for his mother by shoving her away as she offers to come along.

Joey takes the pair to an abandoned warehouse where he has been in hiding, and takes their pictures with Mrs Beaumont's camera, hoping to have them made for passport photos to escape to Australia. He strikes Maureen again, wherein Henry reveals his newfound hatred for his father. Joey locks them in the warehouse basement with no food or heat, where Maureen begins to go into labor. Henry delivers the baby girl while the police attempt to locate Joey.

Joey returns, and Henry hits him over the head with a large object, forcing him to reveal that he murdered Paul's father to fake his own death and desert as Ronald caught him looting, and assumed the new identity of Walter Briggs from some paperwork on the office table. The police arrive and kill Joey after he begins a shootout, and Henry holds his father as he dies.

Ronald Jeffries is reburied with military honors, restoring his family's name, and Joey is dolefully buried as well. Grandmother Dodge attempts to move out of the house in shame and the family convinces her to stay and settle with her demons. Henry calls Bill "dad" for the first time as he is leaving the house to meet Grace, where it is revealed she is moving away temporarily for school and Henry has accepted an apprenticeship in a photography shop. They kiss in the theater they visited so frequently and the film ends.

== Cast ==
- Josh Bolt – Henry Dodge
- Charlie May-Clark – Grace
- John Henshaw – Charlie
- Elaine Cassidy – Maureen Dodge
- Dean Andrews – Bill
- Sheila Hancock – Gran
- Perry Millward – Paul Jeffries
- Barbara Flynn – Mrs Beaumont
- Pooky Quesnel – Mrs Jeffries
- Stephen Campbell Moore – Joey Dodge
- Simon Kunz – Inspector Titmus
- John Draycott – Photographer
