= The Be All and End All =

The Be All and End All is a 2009 British film shot in Liverpool. It stars Eugene Byrne, Josh Bolt, Connor McIntyre, Liza Tarbuck and Neve McIntosh. With comic and heartfelt results the story tells the story of a friendship between two boys Ziggy (Byrne) and Robbie (Bolt). Robbie is dying of cardiomyopathy and desperately does not want to leave the earth a virgin.

The film is directed and produced by Bruce Webb and the production company is Whatever Pictures Ltd.

== Plot ==
At fifteen, Robbie has only one thing on his mind - losing his virginity. The problem is that he's in hospital with a fatal heart condition. And who has to overcome the odds and help him fulfill his final wish? His best friend Ziggy.
