= Spotlight (company) =

Casting resource

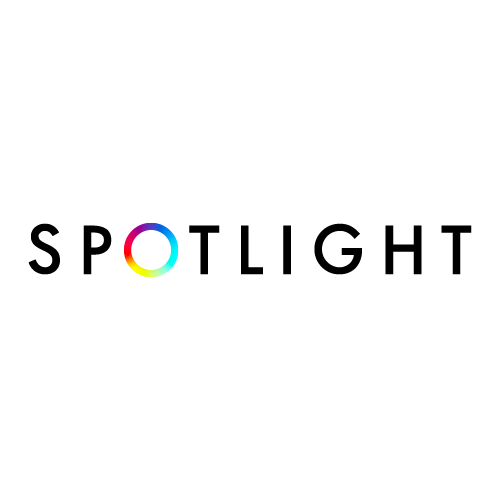
- Industry: Entertainment
- Founded: 1927; 99 years ago
- Headquarters: 16 Garrick Street, London, United Kingdom
- Areas served: UK, Europe
- Services: Casting Directory, Rehearsal and Audition Space
- Owner: Talent Systems
- Website: spotlight.com

Spotlight is a casting resource in the United Kingdom. Founded in 1927, it has actors, actresses, presenters, dancers, and voice over artists in its database. It is used by production companies, broadcasters, advertisement agencies, and casting directors. It also hosts a public "Contacts Listings" section, which lists a variety of professionals which provide services to the entertainment industry.

Spotlight has been in film, television and theatre casting since 1927.

== History ==
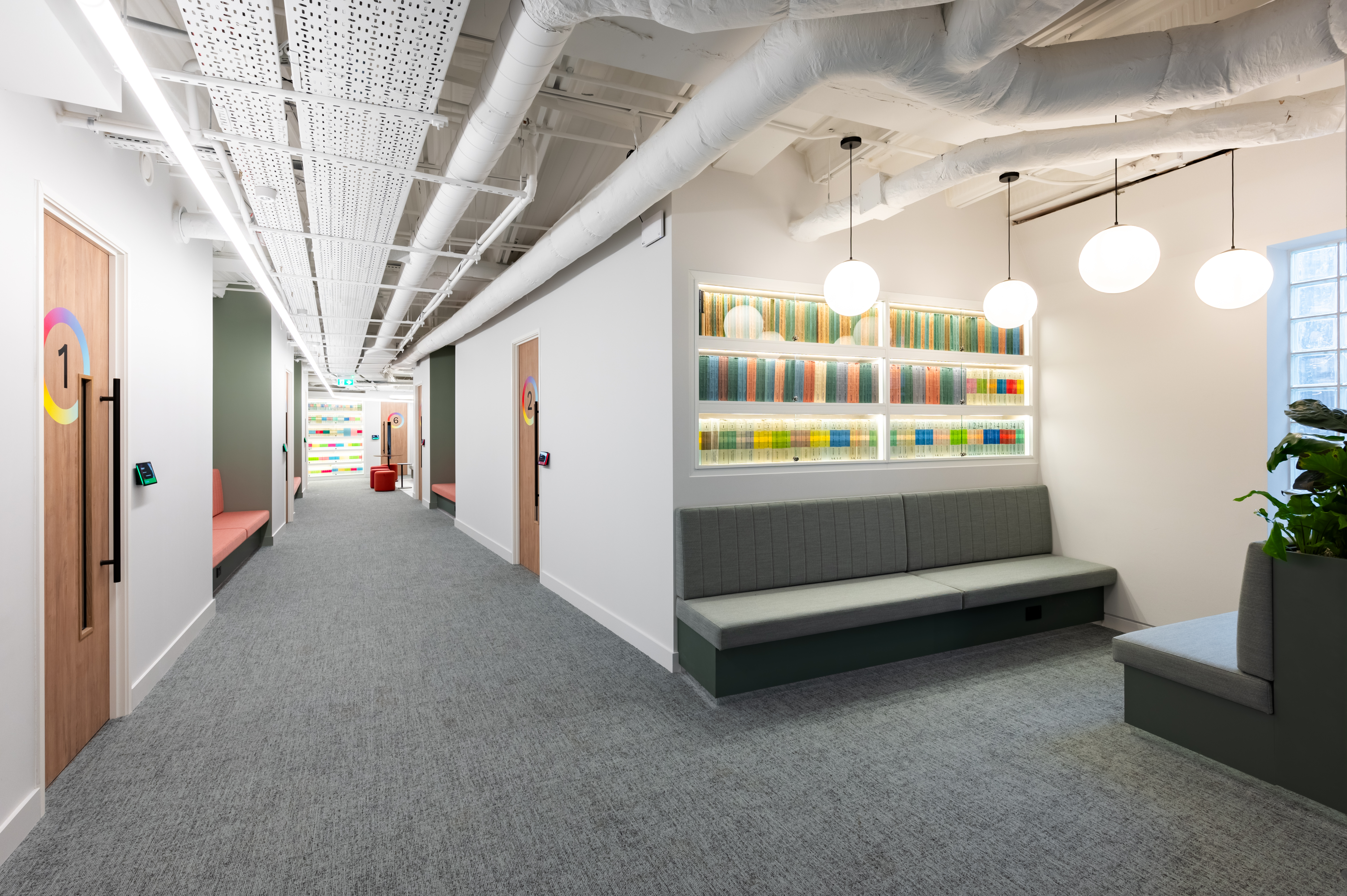
The Spotlight studios at 16 Garrick Street (credit: Paul Porter)

Spotlight was founded in 1927, when stage manager Keith Moss came up with the Spotlight Directory to connect theatre directors and casting directors with actors. His first directory featured 236 performers and 2 dogs.

Rodney Millington joined Spotlight as the managing director, and thanks to his leadership, Spotlight was a casting staple by World War II. It was judged as so essential to this industry (which in itself was significant due to how it bolstered morale) that it was granted an exemption from paper rationing.

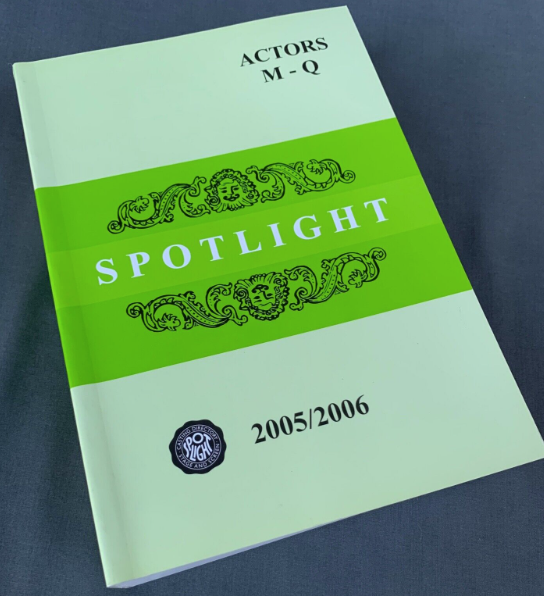
The cover of the Spotlight actors' directory from 2005 for surnames M-Q

After the war, the Seale family took over. Kenneth Seale joined the company as an employee, and later became a director. He was succeeded by his son Nigel, who launched a CD version of Spotlight in 1995, which won a Professional Publishers Association award. The directory was moved online in 1997. Spotlight was registered as an unlimited company in 2010, which does not have to disclose its profits publicly. The final print directory was published in 2017. Nigel Seale died in 2019 aged 78. His daughters Emma and Philippa worked for Spotlight, and his son Ben became chief executive.

Spotlight was acquired by Talent Systems in 2020. In 2021, Matt Hood took over as the managing director. Spotlight moved their offices and studios from Leicester Square to Garrick Street in October 2023.

== Spotlight Directories ==
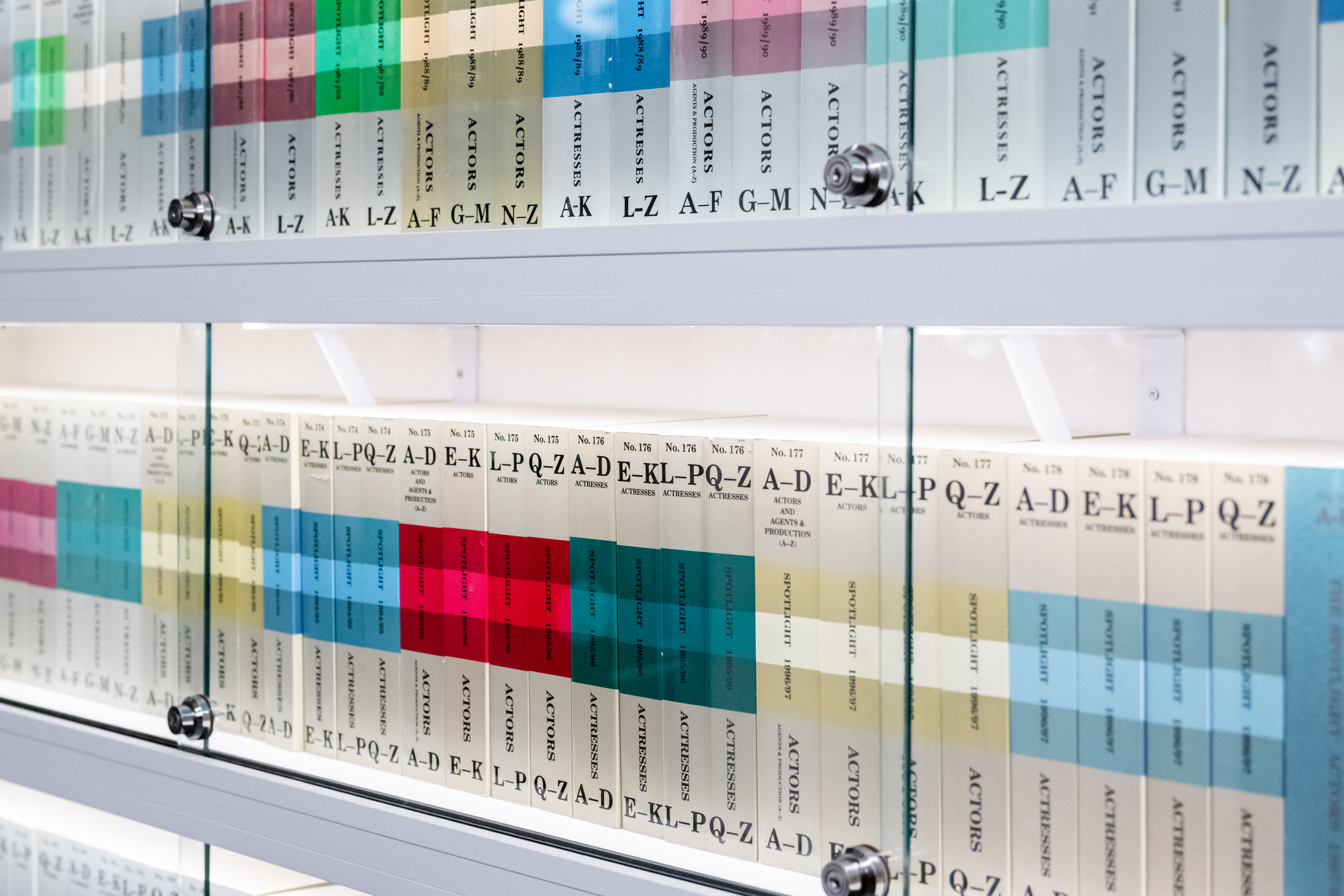
The Spotlight directories on display at the studios in 16 Garrick Street (credit: Paul Porter)

Spotlight was the publisher of annual directories of entertainment industry professionals from 1927 to 2017 including:

- Actors
- Actresses
- Presenters
- Dancers
- Children & Young Performers
- Graduates
- Stunts
- Contacts
- The Production Directory
