= Kätlin Kaldmaa =

Estonian writer

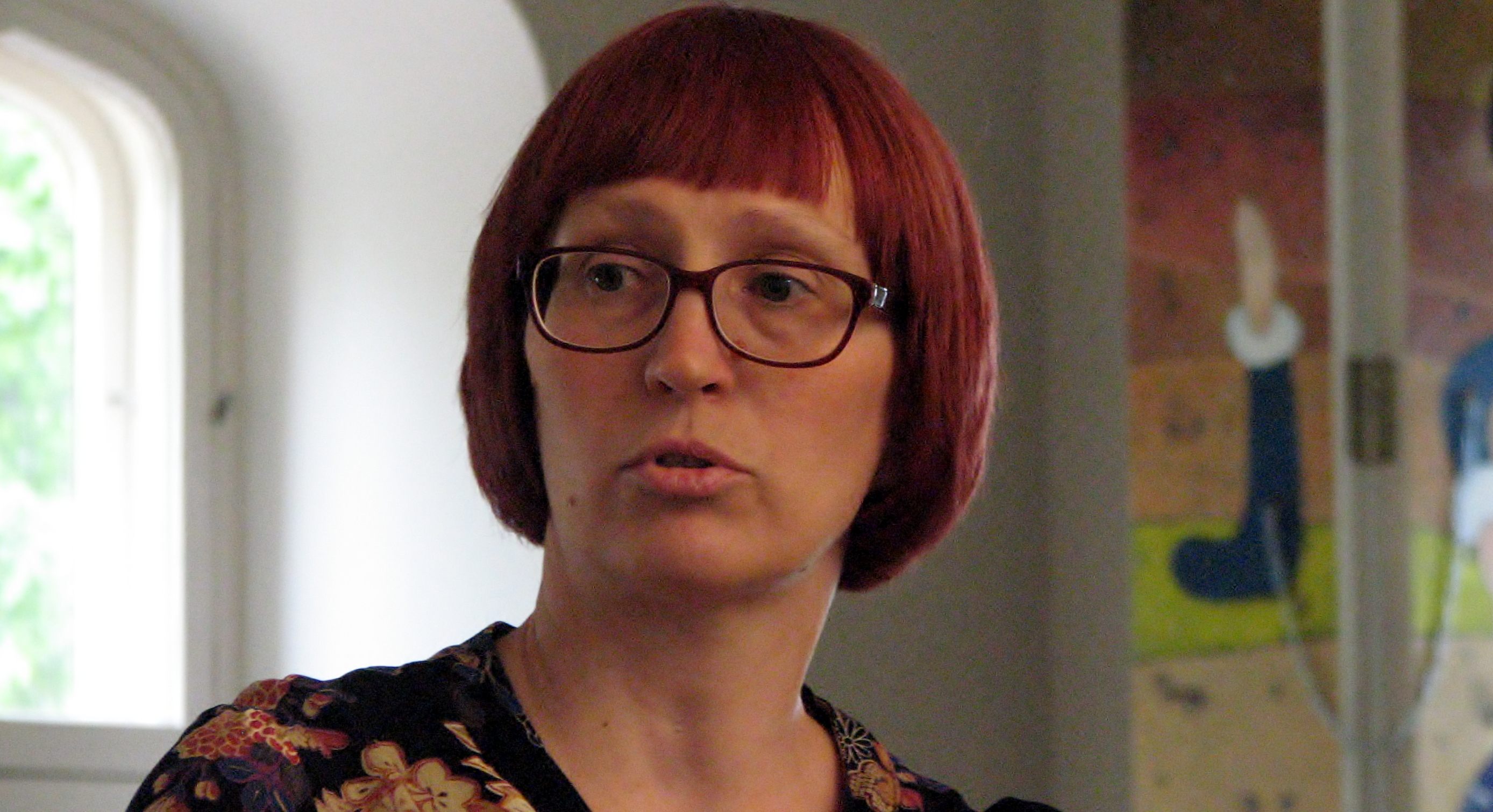
Kätlin Kaldmaa in 2012

Kätlin Kaldmaa (born August 30, 1970) is an Estonian freelance writer, poet, translator and literary critic. Since 2010, Kaldmaa is the president of the Estonian PEN. In 2016 she was elected Secretary of the PEN International.

== Early life and education ==
Kätlin Kaldmaa was born August 30, 1970, and grew up in Voore, in Jõgeva County. She was the second child of four. Her parents were veterinary technicians. Books have had an important role in Kaldmaa’s life since childhood, when reading and writing them became her favourite pastime. At 18, she moved to Tartu, where she studied Estonian philology at Tartu University. Later, she graduated in English philology from Tallinn University.

== Career ==
From 1999 to 2006 Kaldmaa worked as an executive director at SDI Media Estonia, a company providing translation services for television. 2006–2010 she was the manager of the cultural news department of the daily newspaper Eesti Päevaleht, and the editor and publisher of its cultural supplement Arkaadia. 2009–2011 Kaldmaa was the editor-in-chief of the literary magazine Lugu, from 2010–2016 the director of foreign relations at the Estonian Children’s Literature Centre. On the February 3rd 2010 the Estonian PEN was reestablished and Kaldmaa elected its president, a position she holds to this day. Since 2016 she works as a freelance writer and translator. She organises and performs at many literary events in Estonia and abroad. On 28 September 2016, at the 82nd PEN International Congress in Ourense, Spain, she was elected Secretary of PEN International.

Kaldmaa has written poetry, children’s books, prose and numerous other texts, including literature textbooks and exercise books for schools with Anni Kalm. The uniting elements of her work are magical realism, experimentation and play with language and form, and sharp, critical observations and analysis of different aspects of being human. Bravely and honestly she dissects topics such as death, pain, love, growing up and family. Many of her works contain social criticism and a feminist dimension. Poetry and prose are not sharply distinct literary categories for her, but intertwined and mutually supporting ways of writing and thinking. Kaldmaa has said that her poems are often born from ideas that don’t leave her alone, ideas that want to be expressed and are searching for a form.

Kaldmaa started her literary career as a translator, and most of her extensive language skills are self-taught. For Kaldmaa, translating and working with other translators is inspiring work, the best training for creative writing. She has translated over 70 literary works into Estonian from English, Finnish and Spanish. Her own poetry has been translated into numerous languages: Arabic, Japanese, Korean, and Galician, for example. Kaldmaa’s Lugu Keegi Eikellegitütre isast (The Story of Somebody Nobodysdaughter’s Father) is the first children’s book by an Estonian author that has been translated into Icelandic, her Armastuse geograafia was the first collection of poetry by an Estonian author published in Arabic, and in 2017, Geografía del amor, based on Armastuse geograafia, became the first ever book of Estonian poetry published in Chile.

== Publications in Estonian ==
=== Poetry ===
- Larii-laree (Eesti Raamat 1996)
- Üks pole ühtegi/One is none (quadrilingual, in Estonian, English, Russian and Finnish, Positive Projects 2008)
- Nägemata ilmad (Unseen Worlds, bilingual, in Estonian and English, NyNorden 2009)
- Armastuse tähestik (The Alphabet of Love, bilingual, in Estonian and English, NyNorden 2012)

=== Prose ===
- Islandil ei ole liblikaid (No Butterflies in Iceland, novel, Ajakirjade Kirjastus 2013)
- Väike terav nuga (A Little Sharp Knife, collection of short stories, Tuum 2014)

=== Children's literature ===
- Neli last ja Murka (Four Kids and Murka, Hermes 2010)
- Lugu Keegi Eikellegitütre isast (The Story of Somebody Nobodysdaughter’s Father, Ajakirjade Kirjastus 2012)
- Halb tüdruk on jumala hea olla (It's Damn Good To Be a Bad Girl, Varrak 2016)

=== Essays ===
- Kolmteist Eesti kirja (Thirteen Estonian Letters, collection of essays by multiple authors, including Eda Ahi, Kärt Hellerma, Kätlin Kaldmaa etc., Kultuurileht 2016)

=== Autobiographical works ===
- Õnn on otsuse küsimus (Happiness Is a Matter of Choice, Ajakirjade Kirjastus 2013)
- Kaks armastuslugu (Two Love Stories, with Hanneleele Kaldmaa, Petrone Print 2017)

== Publications in other languages ==
=== Multilingual ===
- Multilingual Anthology/Antología multilingüe: The Americas Poetry Festival of New York 2016 (translated by Miriam Anne McIlfatrick-Ksenofontov, Artepoética Press 2016)

=== Arabic ===
- The Other Is Not An Island. An Anthology of Contemporary Estonian Poetry (translated by Abdulrahman Almajedi, Makhtootat Publishing House 2016)
- تضاريس الحب (The Alphabet of Love, translated by Abdulrahman Almajedi, Makhtootat Press and Publishing House 2015)

=== English ===
- One Is None (translated by Miriam Anne McIlfatrick-Ksenofontov, A Midsummer Night’s Press 2014)

=== Finnish ===
- Islannissa ei ole perhosia (No Butterflies in Iceland, translated by Outi Hytösen, Fabriikki Kustannus 2016)
- Rakkauden aakkoset (The Alphabet of Love, translated by Anniina Ljokkoi, Savukeidas 2015)
- 8+8. Eesti ja Soome luulet / 8+8. Suomalaista ja virolaista runoutta. I (bilingual poetry anthology, multiple authors, NyNorden, 2013)

=== Galician ===
- Eno mar cabe quant’i quer caber (poetry anthology, translated by Isaac Xubín, Deputación de Pontevedra 2014)

=== Hungarian ===
- Breviárium (collection of short stories, translated by Nóra Kőhalmy, Krisztina Lengyel Tóth, Virág Márkus, Bence Patat, Mónika Segesdi, Viktória Tóth, Észt Intézet - Pluralica 2016)

-Izlandon nincsenek lepkék

=== Icelandic ===
- Einhver Ekkineinsdóttir (The Story of Somebody Nobodysdaughter’s Father, translated by Lemme Linda Olafsdóttir, Bókstafur 2016)

=== Latvian ===
- Būt sliktai meitenei ir dievīgi (It's Damn Good to Be a Bad Girl, translated by Maima Grīnberga, Liels un Mazs 2019)

=== Russian ===
- Новые oблака, 3-4 2016 (anthology, translated by Maria Einman, P. I. Filimonov, Igor Kotjuh, oblaka 2016)
- Октябрь: БЕРЕГ ЛИТЕРАТУРЫ. Новое слово Латвии, Литвы, Эстонии (anthology, translated by P. I. Filimonov, Igor Kotjuh, Vera Prohorova, Andrei Sen-Senkov, Jelena Skulskaja, Tatjana Verhoustinskaja, 2015)

=== Spanish ===
- Geografía del amor (The Alphabet of Love, translated by Lawrence Schimel, Editorial Cuarto Propio 2017)

== Selection of translations into Estonian ==
- Jeanette Winterson Kirg (The Passion, Varrak, 1998)
- Jeanette Winterson Kehale kirjutatud (Written on the Body, Tänapäev, 2004)
- Jeanette Winterson Tuletornipidamine (Lighthousekeeping, Tänapäev, 2006)
- Jeanette Winterson Taak (Weight , Eesti Päevaleht, 2006)
- Jeanette Winterson Apelsinid pole ainsad viljad (Oranges Are Not The Only Fruit, Tänapäev, 2008)
- Jeanette Winterson Kivist jumalad (The Stone Gods, Tänapäev, 2011)
- Siri Kolu, Meie, Rööbelid, ja vapijaht (Ajakirjade Kirjastus, 2015)
- Carol Clewlow Abielurikkumise käsiraamat naistele (A Woman's Guide To Adultery, Varrak, 1997)
- Peter A. Clayton Vaaraode kroonika (Chronicle of the Pharaohs, Eesti Entsüklopeediakirjastus, 2001)
- J. P. Donleavy Naine, kellele meeldisid puhtad tualettruumid (The Lady Who Liked Clean Rest Rooms, Hotger, 2002)
- Mitch Albom Teisipäevad Morrie’ga (Tuesdays with Morrie, Hotger, 2002)
- Jean Klare and Louise van Swaaij Kogemuste atlas (The Atlas of Experience, Eesti Päevaleht, 2004)
- Michael Ondaatje Inglise patsient (The English Patient, Eesti Päevaleht, 2006)
- Kees Dorst Kuidas mõista disaini (Understanding Design, Kunstiakadeemia, 2006)
- Junot Díaz Uppunud (Drown, Hotger, 2007)
- Diana Issidorides Armastuse atlas (Landscapes of Love: An Atlas of the Heart, Eesti Päevaleht, 2007)
- Alexander McCall Smith Unenägude Angus (Dream Angus, Eesti Päevaleht, 2007)
- Meg Rosoff Nii ma nüüd elan (How I Live Now, Varrak, 2007)
- James Meek Suurim armastusakt (The People's Act of Love, Eesti Päevaleht, 2008)
- Colum McCann Tantsija (Dancer, Eesti Raamat, 2008)
- Aphra Behn Oroonoko (Oroonoko, Kultuurileht, 2009)
- Gabriel García Márquez Kaksteist kummalist palverändurit (Doce Cuentos Peregrinos, Eesti Raamat, 2009)
- Ali Smith Tüdruk otsib poissi (Girl Meets Boy, Eesti Päevaleht, 2010)
- Gabriel Zaid Liiga palju raamatuid (Los demasiados libros, Kultuurileht, 2011)
- Madeleine Thien Armastatud ja kardetud (Pegasus, 2012)
- Goran Simić Kui sured nagu kass (Kite, 2013)
- Karen Connelly Tule, külm jõgi (Come Cole River, Kite, 2015)

== Awards and honors ==
- 2012 Good Children’s Book (The Story of Somebody Nobodysdaughter’s Father)
- 2016 Good Children’s Book (It’s Damn Good to Be a Bad Girl)
- 2017 The White Ravens (It’s Damn Good to Be a Bad Girl)
