= List of alumni of St Catherine's College, Oxford =

A list of alumni of St Catherine's College, Oxford.

The list includes alumni associated with the Delegacy for Unattached Students, the Delegacy for Non-Collegiate Students and St Catherine's Society prior to the official founding of the college.

== Academics ==
- R. J. Q. Adams – American historian who specializes in the history of Great Britain
- Christopher Bishop – Chief Research Scientist at Microsoft Research, Cambridge, and Chair of Computer Science at the University of Edinburgh
- Tim Brighouse – educationist, previously Schools Commissioner for London
- Ben Britton - materials scientist and engineer
- Andrew Stewart Coats - cardiologist
- John Cornforth – 1975 Nobel laureate in Chemistry
- Denis Cosgrove – former Alexander von Humboldt Professor of Geography at the University of California, Los Angeles
- Chris Greening - biochemist and microbiologist
- Carl Marci – American neuroscientist
- Mark Miodownik – materials scientist, engineer, broadcaster
- Seamus Perry - lecturer in English Literature
- Gene Sharp – leading theoretician on nonviolent struggle
- John Vane – 1992 Nobel laureate in Medicine
- Rudolf Vleeskruijer – founder of the English Institute of the University of Utrecht
- John E. Walker – 1997 Nobel laureate in Chemistry
- Paul Wilmott – British mathematician and quantitative analyst
- David Yates – previous Warden of Robinson College, Cambridge

== Public life ==
- Benazir Bhutto – Pakistani politician, elected to an Honorary Fellowship of the College 1989
- John Birt – former Director-General of the BBC
- Simon Bridges - New Zealand politician, previously Leader of the Opposition (National Party)
- Christian Cole - barrister, first black graduate of the University of Oxford
- Alexander Curtis - youngest mayor in the United Kingdom
- Barun De – historian; formerly Chairman, West Bengal Heritage Commission
- Clark Kent Ervin – first Inspector General of the US Department of Homeland Security
- Timothy Garden, Baron Garden – Liberal Democrat
- Farooq Leghari – former President of Pakistan
- Peter Mandelson – architect of "New Labour", several times a UK Cabinet minister, and Trade Commissioner in the Barroso Commission 2004–2008
- Hiren Mukherjee – Member of Parliament, Calcutta North East, 1952–77
- Richard Newby, Baron Newby – Liberal Democrat politician
- Bob Peirce – diplomat
- Jane Poole-Wilson MHK - Minister for Justice and Home Affairs and Deputy Chief Minister (2021-2026), Isle of Man Government
- Ellie Reeves – British politician and Chair of the Labour Party
- Yannis Stournaras - Governor of the Bank of Greece
- H. S. Suhrawardy – first Bengali Prime Minister of Pakistan
- Eric Williams – Prime Minister of Trinidad and Tobago

== Religion ==
- Alan Chesters – Church of England Bishop of Blackburn
- Audrey Elkington – Archdeacon of Bodmin
- Dewi Zephaniah Phillips – Philosopher of religion

== Writers ==
- Clive Barnes – theatre critic
- Mark Beech – writer and broadcaster, rock critic
- Michael Billington – critic, author and radio presenter
- Euros Bowen – Welsh poet
- Jeremy Duns – British author
- Adam Foulds – novelist and poet
- Joseph Heller – American author and playwright; Catch-22
- Ernest Hilbert – American poet, book critic, opera librettist, and editor
- Sam Llewellyn – author
- David Rudkin – playwright
- Paul Spike – author, editor and journalist
- Maurice Wiggin - journalist and author
- Simon Winchester – author and historian; The Surgeon of Crowthorne; The Map that Changed the World
- Jeanette Winterson – author of books including Oranges Are Not the Only Fruit, Sexing the Cherry, Written on the Body, The World and Other Places
- P. C. Wren – novelist, author of Beau Geste

== Performing arts ==
- Alice Eve – actress
- Emilia Fox – actress
- Grant Gee – film director, best known for the documentary Meeting People is Easy
- Guthrie Govan - musician
- Richard Herring – comedian
- Amara Karan - actress
- Olly Mann – podcaster and broadcaster, co-creator of the podcast Answer Me This!
- James Marsh - film director
- George Peck – theatre director, founder of the Oxford School of Drama
- Tom Phillips – artist and Royal Academician
- Alex Polizzi – television presenter
- Benjamin Ross – film director
- Mark Simpson – clarinetist, BBC Young Musician of the Year 2006, and BBC Young Composer of the Year 2006
- Ben Willbond - actor, star of Horrible Histories, Yonderland and Ghosts
- Emily Woof – actress
- Helen Zaltzman – podcaster, co-creator of the podcast Answer Me This!

== Business ==
- Victor Blank – Chairman of Lloyds TSB
- Hans-Paul Burkner – Chairman of The Boston Consulting Group
- J. Paul Getty – American mogul and philanthropist

== Sports ==
- Phil de Glanville – former England rugby captain
- David Hemery – Olympic gold medallist in athletics
- Christopher Liwski – American rower and 2005 Oxford Blue
- Matthew Pinsent – Quadruple Olympic gold medallist in rowing
- Colin Smith – British rower and three time Oxford Blue
- Andrew Triggs Hodge- British rower, double Olympic gold medallist
- Derek Wyatt – rugby international, former MP and founder, Oxford Internet Institute
