= Great Moments in Aviation =

Great Moments in Aviation (UK) Shades of Fear (USA)
- DVD cover
- Directed by: Beeban Kidron
- Written by: Jeanette Winterson
- Produced by: Phillippa Giles
- Starring: Rakie Ayola; Jonathan Pryce; John Hurt; Vanessa Redgrave; Dorothy Tutin
- Cinematography: Remi Adefarasin
- Edited by: John Stothart
- Music by: Rachel Portman
- Production company: BBC Films
- Distributed by: BBC Worldwide; Miramax Films
- Release date: May 17, 1994 (France)
- Running time: 93 minutes
- Country: United Kingdom
- Language: English

Great Moments in Aviation is a 1994 British romantic drama film set on a 1950s passenger liner. The film follows Gabriel Angel (Rakie Ayola), a young Caribbean aviator who falls in love with the forger Duncan Stewart (Jonathan Pryce) on her journey to England. Stewart is pursued by his nemesis Rex Goodyear (John Hurt), and the group are supported by Dr Angela Bead (Vanessa Redgrave) and Miss Gwendolyn Quim (Dorothy Tutin), retired missionaries who become lovers during the voyage.

The film was written by Jeanette Winterson, directed by Beeban Kidron and produced by Phillippa Gregory, the same creative team that collaborated on Winterson's Oranges Are Not the Only Fruit in 1990. Winterson intended the screenplay to be reminiscent of a fairy tale, and was unhappy at being asked to write a new ending for its American release.

The film was shown at the 1994 Cannes Film Festival and broadcast on British television in 1995. Although originally intended for theatrical release, it failed to find a theatrical distributor, and was released straight to video in the United States in 1997 under the title Shades of Fear. The film received mixed to negative reviews from critics, and while the lesbian sub-plot in particular was generally well received, Winterson's scripting was a focal point of criticism.

== Plot ==
Set in 1957, Great Moments in Aviation follows Gabriel Angel (Rakie Ayola), a young Caribbean woman from Grenada who embarks on a cruise to England with the intention of becoming an aviator. Upon boarding the ship, Gabriel finds herself assigned shared sleeping quarters with fellow passenger Duncan Stewart (Jonathan Pryce). The rest of the ship's passengers, including missionaries Angela Bead (Vanessa Redgrave) and Gwendolyne Quim (Dorothy Tutin) assume the two are married, and when Professor Rex Goodyear (John Hurt) appears to recognise Duncan as his old acquaintance Alasdair Birch, Duncan fosters the assumption to maintain his cover. It transpires that Duncan is a forger, who many years ago stole a Titian painting from Goodyear and had an affair with his wife. Goodyear believes that his painting is on board the ship, and leads Gabriel to believe that Duncan was responsible for his wife's death. She is furious with Duncan for lying to her, but the two go on to reconcile and later make love. Their romance is complicated by the fact Gabriel professes to have a husband waiting for her in England. She explains that he has been there for two years working, and she is joining him so that she can fulfil her lifelong dream of becoming a pilot — inspired by her grandfather Thomas (Oliver Samuels) who flew off into a storm and never came home. They begin a relationship nonetheless, supported by Angela and Gwendolyne, who also come to realise that they have feelings for one another. They each confess to having secretly been in love with the other for years, and become lovers, vowing to live together in their retirement. It comes to light that the death of Goodyear's wife was an accident, caused as he and Duncan fought over her. Duncan returns his painting, and goes on to burn all his forged documents and papers in front of Gabriel. She confesses that her marriage to Michael is over, and she and Duncan resolve to begin a life together. The film ends with Gabriel's grandmother Vesuvia (Carmen Munroe) reading her family a letter from England, informing them that Gabriel and Duncan are happy together (even as they have to deal with the racism of several Britons towards their interracial relationship), and they are expecting a child. As the family express their delight, Gabriel flies overhead, having finally attained her pilot's license and become an aviator.

== Cast ==
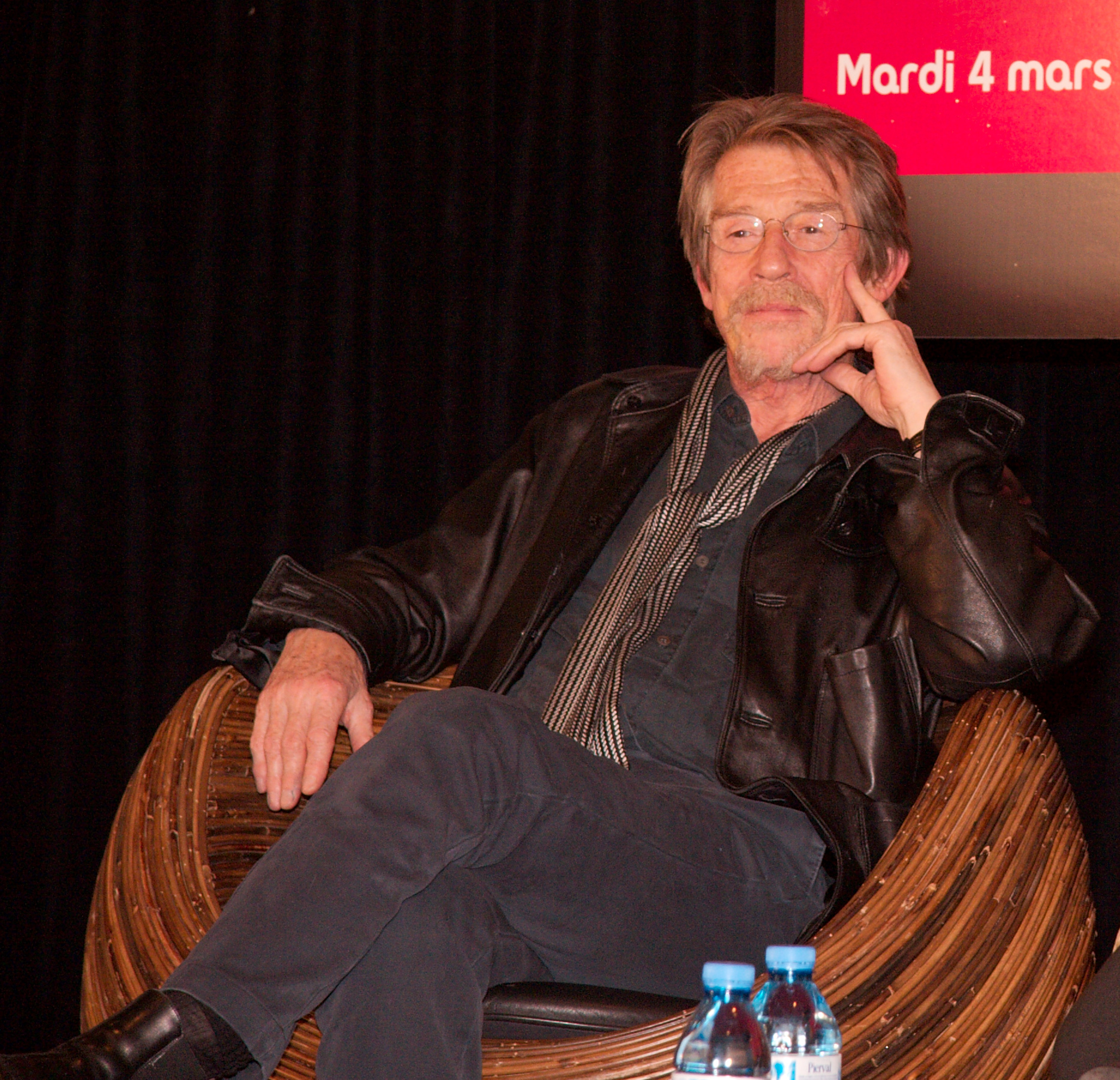
John Hurt plays Rex Goodyear, a non-typical villain who "may not be a villain at all".

- Rakie Ayola as Gabriel Angel
- Jonathan Pryce as Duncan Stewart
- John Hurt as Professor Rex Goodyear
- Vanessa Redgrave as Doctor Angela Bead
- Dorothy Tutin as Miss Gwendolyne Quim
- Carmen Munroe as Vesuvia
- Oliver Samuels as Thomas
- David Harewood as Steward

== Production ==
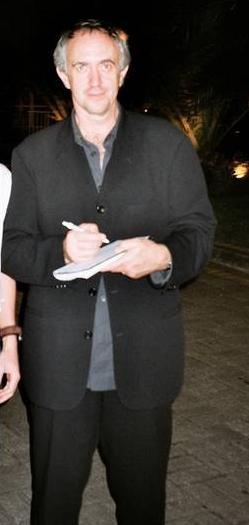
Jonathan Pryce stars as Duncan Stewart: "a forger, a fantasist, a most compelling man."

Great Moments in Aviation was written by Jeanette Winterson, directed by Beeban Kidron and produced by Phillippa Giles, the same creative team who, in 1990, adapted Winterson's novel Oranges Are Not the Only Fruit for television. Giles, for whom Great Moments was her first feature film, believes that it was the success of Oranges which lead the British Broadcasting Corporation (BBC) to approve the film so easily. The screenplay is inspired by the emigration story of the mother of actress Vicky Licorish, a close friend of Winterson. It is adapted from a short story Winterson wrote entitled "Atlantic Crossing", published in 1999 in her anthology The World and Other Places. The central themes of the story are "race, Hemingway, colonialism, love, lust, the [and the] '50s", adapted into the screenplay in a manner Winterson intended to be reminiscent of a fairytale. She ascribes the roles of hero and heroine to Duncan and Gabriel, fairy godmothers to Miss Quim and Dr Bead, and non-archetypal villain to Rex Goodyear. Setting the film on a passenger liner, with brief scenes in Gabriel's native Grenada were intended to contribute towards this fairytale atmosphere, with Winterson explaining that the opening sequence in the Caribbean is "designed to draw the audience out of the world of their own concerns and into a world whose customs are strange. In the new world, objects are unfamiliar and events do not follow the usual rules. The coincidence of colour and language, each more vivid than normal, pull the viewer forward with fairytale immediacy." Of the passenger liner aspect, she explains that it provides the film with: "a sealed and contained world with its own identity and rituals, at once both recognisable and odd. Fairytale never leaves the reader in a familiar spot, we are whisked away to a wood or a lake or a castle or an island, each a law unto itself made all the more uncomfortable because it isn't as weird as, say, planet Mars. We think we will be able to cope just by using out usual tool kit, how disconcerting it is when we can't."

The film originally had a different ending to the one later released in America under the title Shades of Fear. Miramax co-founder Harvey Weinstein requested that the ending be reworked prior to distribution, and Winterson was highly unhappy at being asked to write an additional conclusionary scene. Winterson's preferred ending sees Rex Goodyear burn the painting he believes to be fraudulent, only to discover he actually had the genuine item in his possession all along, and has now destroyed it. This ties in with the major theme of the film in Winterson's eyes, whereby "Duncan, Gabriel, Miss Bead and Miss Quim all find something valuable where they least expected it, Rex Goodyear finds that the things we value are very often worthless." Winterson has called Weinstein "a bully who knows the gentle touch", referring to the new ending as "the most expensive words I will ever write". While she believes that the new ending is satisfying, she feels the film has lost some dimensions which were important to her and concludes: "It is a good movie but it is not the movie I thought we could make. [...] I do like Great Moments but there is another film in there somewhere that has got lost."

Of the starring cast, Pryce, Hurt, Redgrave and Tutin were already established screen actors, while Ayola had previously only acted theatrically. She appraised of her screen debut: "it was a wonderful experience for me to be appearing alongside so many established names. It was very exciting although I must admit at first I was a bit daunted by the prospect." The film featured several minor black characters, either as members of Gabriel's family, or as workers aboard the ship. When these roles were cast, complaints were made by black members of the British actors' union to the BBC and the Department of Employment at having been "passed over" in favour of overseas artists. The film was shot from 23 September to 6 November 1992. It was funded in the most part by the BBC, though a quarter of the budget came from the American company Miramax. Kidron found the low budget of Great Moments in Aviation "just as horrendous a compromise" as working with a major studio. Though originally intended for theatrical release, the film failed to find theatrical distribution. It was first screened at the Cannes Film Festival in 1994, then broadcast in Britain on BBC Two on 11 November 1995. It was released on video in the United States under the alternative title Shades of Fear two years later, on 11 November 1997.

== Reception ==
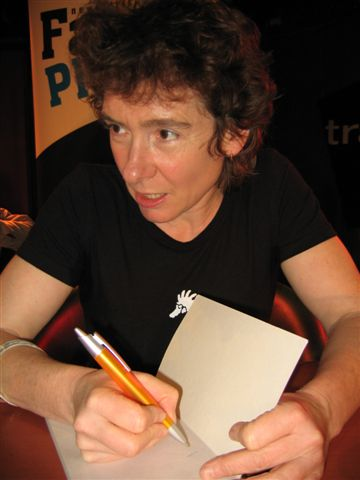
Jeanette Winterson's screenplay attracted negative reviews from critics.

The film received mixed to negative reviews from critics. Thomas Sutcliffe for The Independent wrote that: "while flight is the sustaining theme, the film never soars. The characterisation is Cluedo with pretensions, and the dialogue suspends the actors in that ungainly, undignified dangle which you associate with stage flying, the wires robbing them of all powers of independent movement." While he describes the scene which culminates the lesbian storyline as "radiant" and "beautifully acted by Vanessa Redgrave and Dorothy Tutin", he opines of the acting in general that "for the most part, these people are simply Winterson's puppets, jerked around by the symbolic demands of the plot." He deems Kidron's directing "a kind of surrender, dutifully supplying visual equivalents for Winterson's sterile symmetries but despairing of any greater vivacity", and is particularly critical of Winterson's screenplay, noting that: "everything unrolls at the same stately pace, a religious procession bearing the reliquaries of Winterson's prose. It's as though the author thinks every word is infinitely precious. She's right, though perhaps not in the way she imagines." Variety′s David Rooney agreed the film's coming-out scene is a "potential jewel" and "captivatingly played", however, in line with Sutcliffe's criticisms, he opined that the film's pacing meant that "the scene is lobbed in and robbed of its impact". He summarised the film as "a willfully theatrical, sporadically magical romantic comedy embracing three barely compatible narrative strands, not one of which ever gets full flight clearance". Rooney deemed the film "damaged beyond repair by a mannered scripting style and evident recutting", and opined that "Jeanette Winterson's preposterous dialogue and comic mistiming serves up more misses than hits". Of the film's major themes, he wrote that: "Questions about the line between truth and falsehood, genuine and fake, are too flimsily voiced to mean much. Likewise, the intro of race issues in the closing voiceover only makes the haphazard mix even more lumpy".

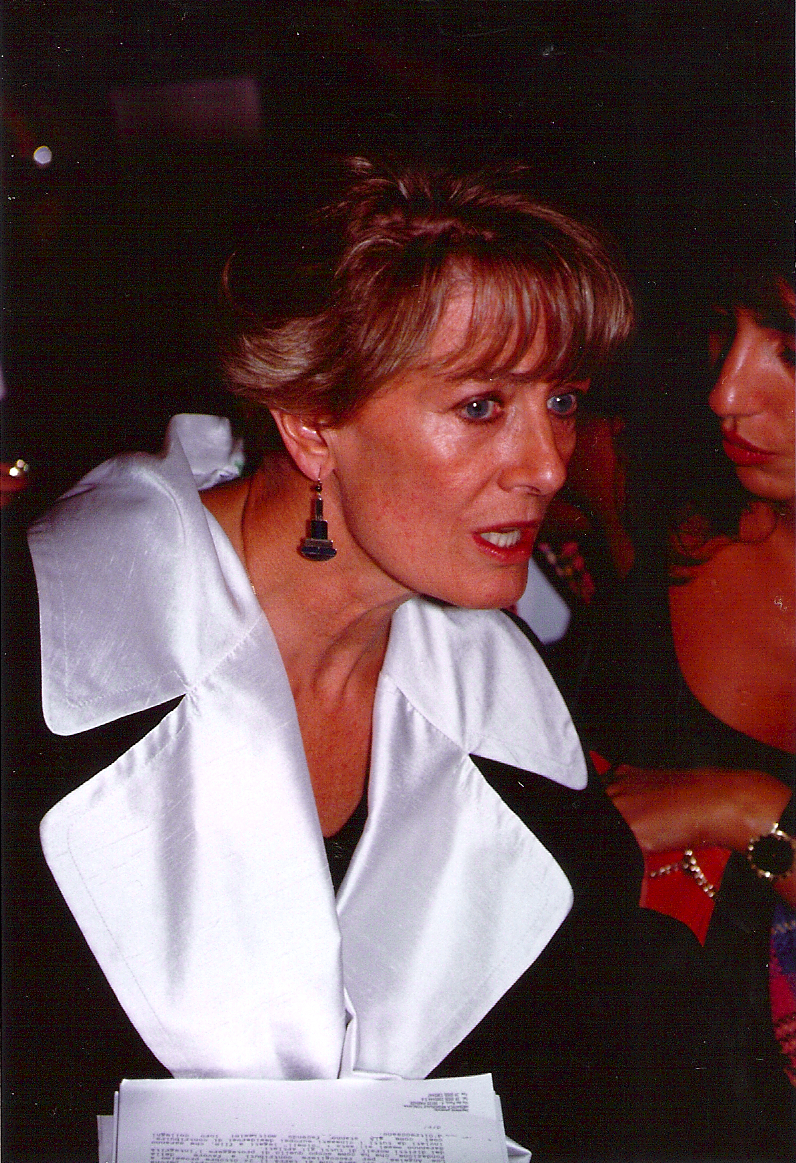
Vanessa Redgrave's performance as Angela Bead in the lesbian sub-plot was well received.

More positively, Rooney praised Remi Adefarasin's cinematography and Rachel Portman's soundtrack, as well as Ayola's acting, writing: "In the film's most naturalistic turn, Ayola is a constant pleasure to watch. Unforced and appealing, she often succeeds in pulling the fanciful fireworks momentarily back down to Earth." The Boston Herald's Paul Sherman agreed that Ayola gives "a winning performance", and deemed the film "generally charming", though he was critical of Miramax's decision to hold the film's release back until 1997, change its title and market it as a mystery rather than a romantic comedy-drama. Lorien Haynes, writing for the Radio Times, also praised the acting in the film; however, she was critical of the cross-genre approach, opining: "Unfortunately, the mixture of romance and mystery doesn't work and even the combined acting talents of Vanessa Redgrave, Jonathan Pryce, John Hurt and Dorothy Tutin can't save it." She deemed the film "disappointing", and wrote that it fails to match the success of Oranges Are Not the Only Fruit. Gilbert Gerard for The Independent selected the film as recommended viewing upon its BBC Two television debut, giving the mixed review: "So much acting talent, so little substance to play with - but the 1950s are authentically enough evoked."

David Bleiler was more positive about the film, writing in his TLA Video & DVD Guide that it "isn't some third-rate, quick-paycheck hack job mystery which the advertising suggests." He called it "an unusual, rewarding drama [...] Well-written by Jeanette Winterson and directed with just the right amount of sensitivity and humor by Kidron". Bleiler stated that the cast are "stellar", Ayola is "radiant", and the revelatory scene between Angela and Gwendolyne is "wonderful", asserting: "Although slight, this is a perfect film for a nice, quiet evening at home". Alison Darren in her Lesbian Film Guide was also positive, asserting that: "Great Moments in Aviation is a little gem of a British film". She described the resolution of the lesbian storyline as "a golden scene, beautifully photographed and exceptionally well paced", and asserted that "For women of a certain age, this may be the most heart-rending (not to say, inspirational) depiction of a coming-out moment ever seen on screen. Whimsical, comic, dramatic and gentle."

== Soundtrack ==
A Pyromaniac's Love Story

Soundtrack album by Rachel Portman
- Released: 28 April 1995
- Genre: Soundtrack
- Length: 59:28
- Label: Varèse Sarabande

While the soundtrack to Great Moments in Aviation was not released independently, nine tracks from the film appear on the album A Pyromaniac's Love Story, which also features music from the film of the same name and Ethan Frome. Variety's David Rooney praised Rachel Portman's compositions as "stirring".

All music is composed by Rachel Portman.

No.	Title	Length
1.	"End Titles"	3:49
2.	"Gabriel Explores Ship"	2:01
3.	"Safe Walls Are Falling"	3:16
4.	"Montage"	1:24
5.	"The Hope Is In Me"	2:08
6.	"Icarus"	1:46
7.	"We Both Killed Her"	0:53
8.	"Vesuvia's Feast"	4:36
9.	"Nothing To Hide"	2:51

== Bibliography ==
- Winterson, Jeanette (23 June 1994). Great Moments in Aviation and Oranges are Not the Only Fruit: Two Filmscripts. Random House. pp. 1–67. ISBN 0-09-928541-X.
- Winterson, Jeanette (4 March 1999). "Atlantic Crossing". The World and Other Places. Random House. pp. 15–28. ISBN 978-0-09-927453-7.
