= Liisi Ojamaa =

Estonian writer (1972–2019)

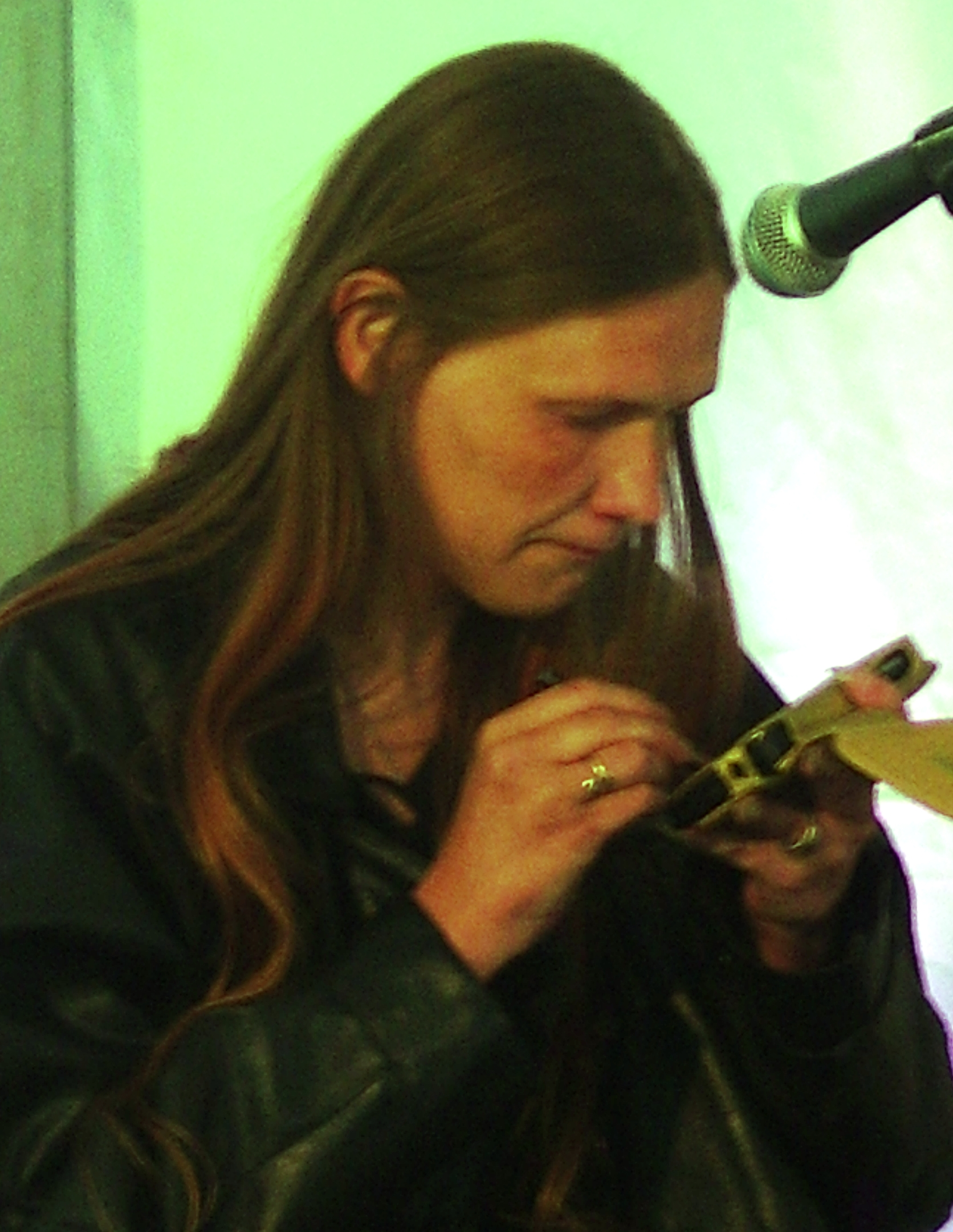
- Ojamaa performing her work at Tallinn Literature Festival
- Born: 26 February 1972; Tallinn, then part of Estonian SSR, Soviet Union
- Died: 8 October 2019 (aged 47); Paldiski, Estonia

Liisi Ojamaa (legally Katre-Liis Ojamaa; 26 February 1972 – 8 October 2019) was an Estonian poet, translator, literary critic and editor. She was already known for her debut collection "Endless July" (Estonian: "Lõputu juuli"), which was included in the collection "Poetry Cassette '90"; Elo Vee (Elo Viiding), Triin Soomets, Ats (Aidi Vallik) and Ruth Jyrjo also made their debut on the tape.

Ojamaa translated over 60 books, mainly children's and science fiction, from English. Her poems have been featured in their lyrics by the bands Toojalind, Lunatic Asylum, Anarch, Taak, The Tuberkuloited and HU?. She worked as a journalist for Õhtuleht, as a translator at the Estonian Law Translation Center and as an editor for the magazine Matrix.

Ojamaa was a member of the Estonian Writers' Union.

== Personal life ==
Liisi Ojamaa's father was translator Jüri Ojamaa and mother was editor Maarja Ojamaa. Her paternal grandmother was Estonian civil servant and translator Lii Ojamaa. She had three daughters.

== Bibliography ==
- Lõputu juuli. Tallinn: Eesti Raamat 1990. 77 S. (Kassett '90)
- Myyrid & wärawad. Tallinn: Perioodika 1993 48 S. (Loomingu Raamatukogu 13/1993)
- Lootus. Tallinn: Varrak 2000. 40 S.
- Ärasaatmata kirjad. Tallinn: Varrak 2002. 61 S.
- Jõgi asfaldi all. Tallinn: Varrak 2008. 52 S.
- Ajalaulud. Tallinn: Varrak 2011. 83 S.

== Works ==
- Piret Viires: Viis tüdrukut ja ei ühtegi poissi, in: Looming 2/1992, S. 277–279.
- Barbi Pilvre: Ja neid saatvad isikud, in: Vikerkaar 3/1992, S. 83–85.
- Marin Laak: Variatsioonid teemale «Kuidas yhiscond mind läbi pexis», in: Keel ja Kirjandus 3/1992, S. 179–182.
- Leelo Tungal: Juulikuu hestab, in: Looming 7/1993, S. 993–995.
- Eve Annuk: Feminismist, Orasest ja natuke ka Ojamaast, in: Vikerkaar 8/1993, S. 84–85.
- Hedda Maurer: Kui ka jumal ise keelaks, in: Looming 1/2001, S. 136–138.
- Martin Oja: Ärasaadetud kirjad, in: Looming 3/2003, S. 452–454.
- Kätlin Kaldmaa: Päikesetõus läbi mitme ilma, in: Looming 11/2008, S. 1742–1743.
- Andres Aule: 9. oktoobril 2019. Mõned hetked Liisi Ojamaaga, in: Lng 11/2019, S. 1598–1601.
