= Suburban Shootout =

British comedy television series

- Created by: Roger Beckett; Gary James Martin; Laurence Bowen
- Directed by: Vito Rocco; Gordon Anderson
- Starring: Amelia Bullmore; Anna Chancellor; Andrew Scarborough; Felicity Montagu; Cathryn Bradshaw; Lucy Robinson; Emma Kennedy; Ralph Ineson; Tom Ellis; Ruth Wilson; Tom Hiddleston
- Opening theme: "The Stempington Stomp" by Daniel Pemberton
- Ending theme: idem
- Country of origin: United Kingdom
- No. of episodes: 14

Production
- Executive producer: Laurence Bowen
- Producer: Greg Boardman
- Running time: 30 minutes (series 1); 60 minutes (series 2) (double episodes)

Original release
- Network: Channel 5
- Release: 27 April 2006 – 20 September 2007

Suburban Shootout is a British satirical black comedy television series produced for Channel 5 and Paramount Comedy by Feelgood Fiction in association with Oxygen. The first series aired in the UK on Channel 5 from 27 April 2006. It began airing in the United States on 22 March 2006 on Oxygen and in Germany on Comedy Central in 2007. The second series began on Channel 5 on 6 September 2007.

== Premise ==
Joyce Hazeldine and her policeman husband Jeremy move from London to what seems to be an idyllic home counties town of Little Stempington. She soon discovers there are two rival gangs of housewives, one headed by Camilla Diamond and one by Barbara Du Prez.

Once very good friends, Camilla and Barbara originally turned to weaponry and intimidation as a way of dealing with crime and antisocial behaviour, and gathered a small group of local women to help further their cause, but the group splintered into two smaller gangs when Camilla grew greedy and used their increased clout for her own personal gain, dealing in extortion, racketeering, coercion and threats to local businesses and residents of the town.

Barbara's gang continues to take extreme action against perceived 'threats to Little Stempington life' (planned low-cost housing, teenagers wearing hoodies, etc.), while also working tirelessly against Camilla's gang. Timid Joyce, unfortunately, becomes a pawn in both gangs, enlisted by Barbara to work undercover as a way of getting closer to Camilla.

The plot later thickens with Camilla racketeering the local recreational drugs market with 8 times strength HRT patches from their contacts in Marseille (hence the twinning with Marseille in the town sign).

== Cast ==
- Amelia Bullmore as Joyce Hazeldine, the naïve newcomer to Little Stempington who on moving to the village is gobsmacked to discover that her well-dressed, well-mannered neighbours are in fact a female mafia. She is of a nervous disposition and frequently attempts to solve disputes by talking them over - not that this method ever gets her anywhere. She works for both Barbara and Camilla during the course of the series, but her true alliance is with the 'good' gang, and during series two she becomes their leader. Throughout the series she battles to keep her excursions into the murky underworld of Little Stempington a secret from her loving husband Jeremy.
- Anna Chancellor as Camilla Diamond, head of the 'bad' gang. Originally very good friends with Barbara du Prez, the two formed an all-female mafia system after accidentally killing a burglar. They used it to keep Little Stempington free of crime, but Camilla saw what the crime could do for her own gain, and the two soon parted ways. She constantly masterminds a variety of schemes to make herself very rich, such as running a male prostitution ring and introducing a female fight club to Little Stempington.
- Felicity Montagu as Barbara du Prez, head of the 'good' gang. Despite being 'good' she employs extreme and often violent methods in order to prevent the bad gang from gaining a stronghold of the town. She is an optimist who takes great pride in her status as a vigilante.
- Rachael Blake as Hilary Davenport, one of Camilla's sidekicks. Hilary is an archetypal cougar, preying on a number of younger men throughout the series. When the bad gang initiate a male prostitution ring, Hilary takes it upon herself to give each of the men a thorough suitability check.
- Cathryn Bradshaw as Margaret Littlefair, a sidekick of Barbara du Prez and the 'good' counterpart to Lillian. A remarkably ditzy woman who seems to know a lot about making explosives and handling guns, it is hinted that Margaret lost her virginity on a table tennis table and has not had sex in an extremely long time, hence her eager trigger finger.
- Lucy Robinson as Pam Draper, a sidekick of Barbara du Prez and the 'good' counterpart to Hilary, although Pam is in fact rather violent and always relishes the opportunity to discipline the unruly youths of Little Stempington. She is particularly posh and is always seen in a clean and pressed suit. She has very little actual compassion for the people she combats, even threatening to castrate a man if he didn't start speaking 'the Queen's English'.
- Emma Kennedy as Lillian Gordon-Moore, one of Camilla's sidekicks. Lillian has more than a passing passion for firearms, and can handle virtually any weapon you put in her hands. Usually dressed in trousers, jodhpurs or similar lady of the manor-style attire. Although not necessarily a lesbian, she is rather taken by Joyce and even saves her life at one point.
- Ralph Ineson as Jeremy Hazeldine, Joyce's husband and the new local superintendent. After moving from the city he finds the job in Little Stempington suspiciously easy, what with the fact that no actual crime has been reported there in many years. At one point he suspects Joyce is having an affair with a French drug baron friend of Camilla's, but he enjoys life in Little Stempington and has no idea that the housewives are anything less than saintly, even after he is drugged by Camilla.
- Tom Ellis as PC Haines, Jeremy's colleague in the force, and apparently the only police officer in Little Stempington. Haines has a habit of stating the obvious and frequently baffles Jeremy with his mind-numbingly boring observations as they sit on patrol in the hope that a crime may occur.
- Ruth Wilson as Jewel Diamond, Camilla's teenage daughter with a rampant sexual appetite and eyes only for Joyce's son Bill. She has little in the way of self-awareness and seemingly no idea that Bill is terrified of her advances. As an aspiring actor (albeit one who cannot act), Jewel is melodramatic in the extreme, and at one point threatens to throw herself from the church roof unless Bill marries her.
- Tom Hiddleston as Bill Hazeldine, Joyce and Jeremy's completely naive son. After coming back from missionary work in Africa, he becomes friends with Jewel Diamond, though he does not know how to handle her sexual advances.
- Andrew Scarborough as Stuart Diamond, Camilla Diamond's hapless and oblivious husband who gets into slapstick situations with Barbra Du Prez's equally hapless husband.
- Vincenzo Nicoli as Emile Lesoux

== Production ==
- The Little Stempington town sign was only seen in the first four episodes in season one, because the writer, Roger Beckett, stole it from the set. It is currently under his bed in his house.
- Most of the filming was done in Pinner, London.

== American remakes ==
In 2008, HBO commissioned a pilot episode of a U.S. version of "Suburban Shootout". The script was written by Michelle Ashford, the episode directed by Barry Sonnenfeld and filmed in the Hamptons, Long Island, NY in September 2008. The cast included Kelly Preston as Camilla Diamond, Judy Greer, Mary Birdsong, Kerri Kenney-Silver, and Rachael Harris The pilot was not picked up to series and never aired.

ABC have commissioned a separate pilot script, also an adaptation of the UK series, this time written by Byron Balasco in the format of a one-hour comedy-drama series. It remains to be seen if the script will be sent to pilot.
