= Kevin Eldon Will See You Now =

BBC Radio 4 programme

Kevin Eldon Will See You Now is a British comedy show broadcast on BBC Radio 4. It is made by Pozzitive Television, and all 4 series have been produced and directed by David Tyler. It is written by and stars the comedian Kevin Eldon.

Over the course of the four series, there have been a number of famous guest stars making appearances, including Paul Putner, Julia Davis, Justin Edwards, Amelia Bullmore, Morwenna Banks, and Miles Jupp.

== Episode list ==
Original Air Date	Episode Title
Series 1	
31 July 2012	1. Welcome
7 August 2012	2. Hooter
14 August 2012	3. Guest Week - With Guests
21 August 2012	4. The One with Anubis, Almighty Jackal-Headed God of the Egyptian Underworld
Series 2	
16 September 2014	1. Rewelcome
23 September 2014	2. You May Know Me As Dudley
30 September 2014	3. Escarpments
7 October 2014	4. The Troublesome Gobstopper
Series 3	
18 Apr 2017	1. Tarquin And The Tiny Studio
25 Apr 2017	2. Some Owls Were Harmed During The Making Of This Programme
2 May 2017	3. The Haunted Ghost Of The Scary Studio Of Terror
9 May 2017	4. Where's David?
Series 4	
29 August 2019	1. A Giraffe On A Pulley
5 September 2019	2. Who The Hell Do You Think You Are?
12 September 2019	3. The Dusty Humbug
19 September 2019	4. God Lends A Hand (Hand Hand)

== Critical reception ==
Kevin Eldon Will See You Now received an overwhelmingly positive reception when it was first broadcast on BBC Radio 4, and has been nominated for a number of awards. The show made the shortlist for the British Comedy Guide Awards for Best Radio Sketch Show in 2017, and again in 2020. Series 3 was also shortlisted for the 2018 Writers Guild Award for Best Radio Comedy, and Series 4 was also shortlisted for both the Radio Award at the Chortle Awards, and the award for Best Scripted Comedy Show at the BBC's Audio Drama Awards. Writing in The Big Issue in 2019, Robin Ince described Kevin Eldon as "a titan of British comedy whose innovative new radio show is giving him the platform his unique talent deserves", while Brian Donaldson, writing for The List, gave Kevin Eldon Will See You Now 4 stars, calling the show "addictive listening".

== Notable awards and nominations ==
- British Comedy Guide Awards - Best Radio Sketch Show - Shortlisted (2017)
- Writers Guild Award - Best Radio Comedy - Shortlisted (2018)
- British Comedy Guide Awards - Best Radio Sketch Show - Shortlisted (2020)
- BBC Audio Drama Awards - Best Scripted Comedy Show - Shortlisted (2020)
