= Kevin Eldon =

British actor and comedian

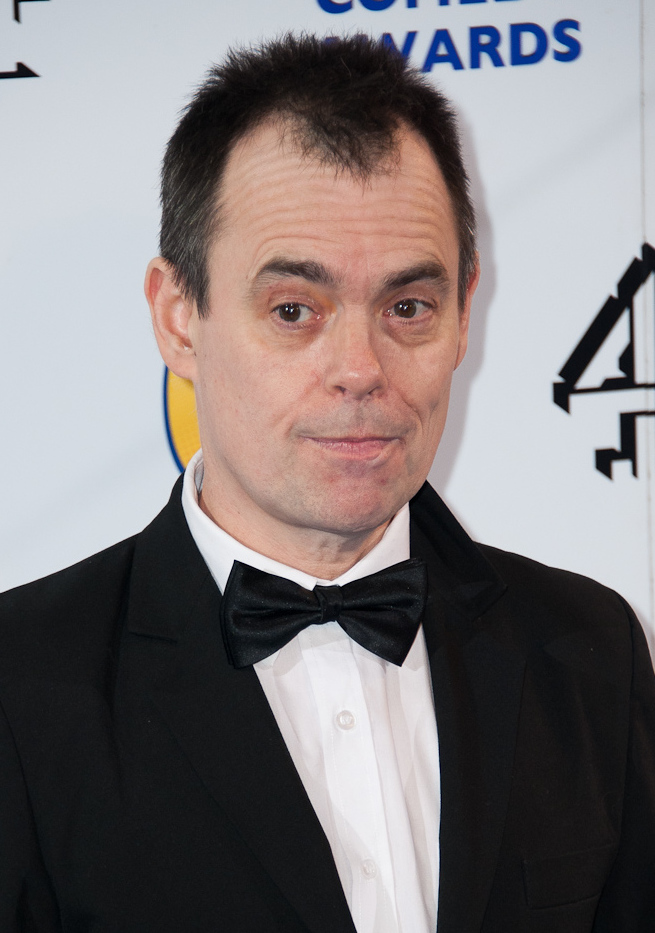
- Eldon in 2013
- Born: Kevin Robinson; Chatham, Kent, England
- Occupations: Actor; comedian
- Years active: 1992–present
- Children: 2

Kevin Eldon is an English actor and comedian. He featured in British comedy television shows of the 1990s including Fist of Fun, This Morning with Richard Not Judy, Knowing Me, Knowing You with Alan Partridge, I'm Alan Partridge, Big Train, Brass Eye and Jam. In 2013, Eldon appeared in his own BBC sketch series It's Kevin. He has also appeared in minor speaking roles in the HBO series Game of Thrones.

== Personal life ==
Eldon was born in Chatham, Kent. He has been a practising Soka Gakkai Nichiren Buddhist since 1990. He has two children with his wife Holly, whom he met in late 2005 on the set of Hyperdrive, where she was the art director.

== Early career and 'Lee & Herring' ==
Eldon occupies half a page in Oliver Gray's book Volume – A Cautionary Tale of Rock and Roll Obsession; this includes coverage of punk-era Hampshire where, in late 1978, with two schoolmates from Bay House School, Gosport, Eldon started a band named Virginia Doesn't. The band's career peaked with a session broadcast on Radio One's John Peel Show on 18 October 1979. In early 1980, Virginia Doesn't morphed into The Time, in which Eldon was again the front man. The Time recorded and performed from April 1980 until August 1982, including support slots with The Jam, Joe Jackson's Jumpin' Jive and Bad Manners. The Time had songs included on several self-released tape compilations, although they never secured a recording contract. In August 1982, The Time became Gerry Hackett & The Fringes, a spoof Sixties revival band. On 6 November 1983 Gerry Hackett & The Fringes appeared on BBC South's The Cellar Show presented by John Sessions. Eldon started on the stand-up circuit in the early 1990s performing an act in-character as the political poet Paul Hamilton, but has also, on occasion, done stand-up as himself.

On the circuit, Eldon formed a friendship with stand-up comedian Stewart Lee, which would later lead to an invitation to work with him on the radio series Lee & Herring's Fist of Fun with Lee's comedy partner Richard Herring. Lee and Herring would usually refer to him as "the actor Kevin Eldon", in reference to his claim to being an actor rather than a comedian. Eldon's work sat well with that of Lee and Herring, and he continued to work with them on many of their projects, including The Lee & Herring Radio Show, Fist of Fun and This Morning with Richard Not Judy. He played recurring characters Simon Quinlank (the self-styled "King of Hobbies") and 'Rod Hull', a nonsensical version of Rod Hull with a prosthetic limb and an obsession with jelly, especially the green variety. In 1994 and 1997, he appeared at the Edinburgh Fringe Festival as part the comedy troupe Cluub Zarathustra; other comedians in the troupe included Johnny Vegas, Simon Munnery, and later Stewart Lee. They were given a Channel 4 pilot, which led to the television series Attention Scum! The book You Are Nothing by Robert Wringham praises the performers' talent. From March 2009, Eldon appeared in Stewart Lee's Comedy Vehicle in a number of the show's sketches, most often with Paul Putner.

== Stage and screen ==
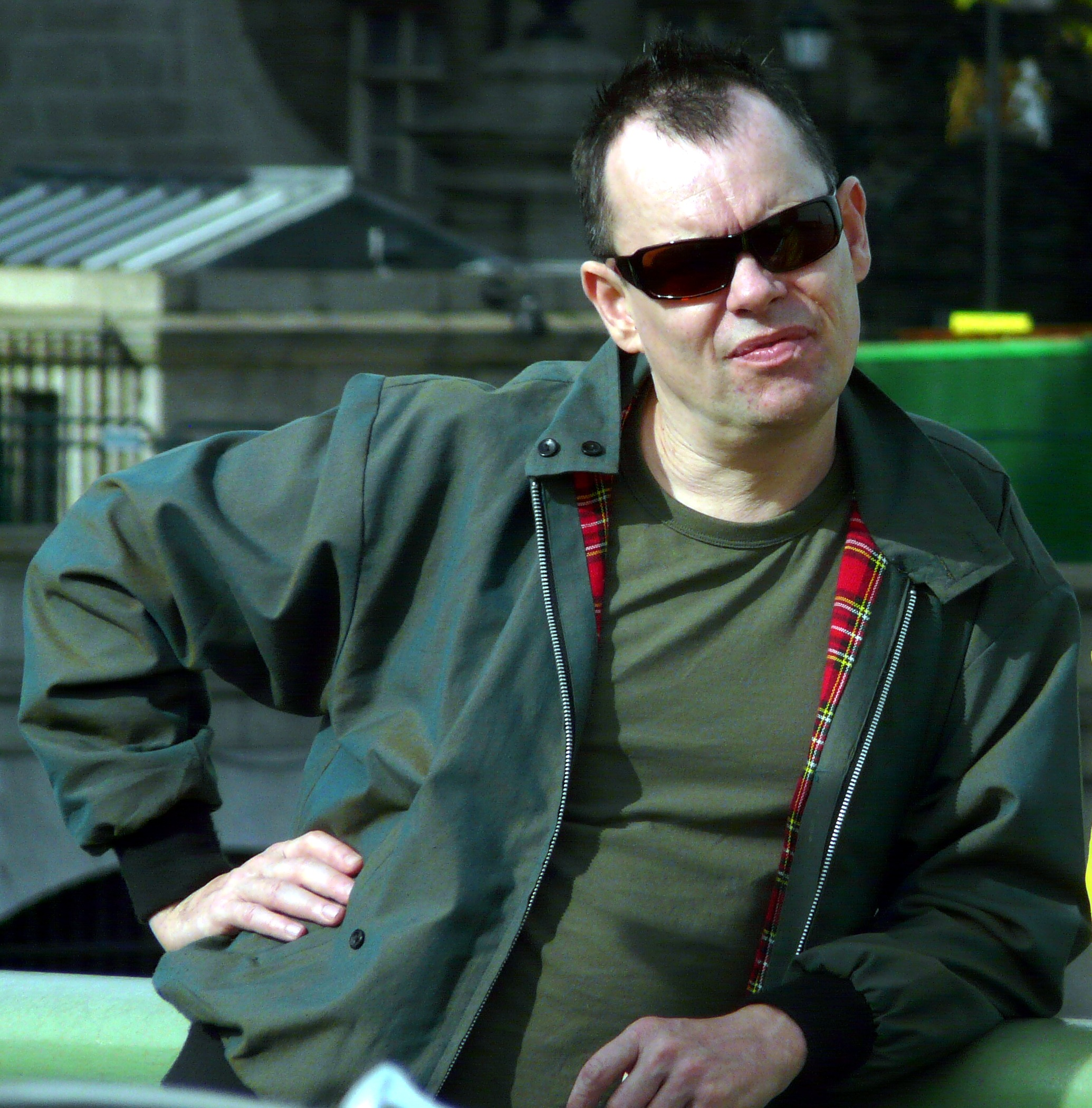
Eldon in 2011 at the Block the Bill Protest on Westminster Bridge

Eldon has appeared in many British comedy shows from the 1990s onwards. One of his first appearances on television was in 1995 in Knowing Me, Knowing You with Alan Partridge as Fanny Thomas, a foul-mouthed transvestite chef and later he appeared on I'm Alan Partridge as the laughing racist, Mike Samson.

During the 1990s, he worked with such comedians as Simon Pegg, Mark Heap, Julia Davis, Amelia Bullmore and others in the sketch-comedy series Big Train. One of Eldon's more notable characters for Big Train, George Martin, was inspired by his impression of the Beatles producer. He had previously worked with some of the cast in the satirical series Brass Eye, and the dark comedy Jam, both written by Christopher Morris. Eldon later acted in Nathan Barley and the 2010 film Four Lions as a police sniper (also written by Christopher Morris). In 2004, Eldon appeared in the BAFTA award-winning dark comedy Nighty Night as Terry Tyrrell, husband to Julia Davis' character. They also appeared later in Hunderby (another dark comedy written by Julia Davis), Little Crackers and Psychobitches. He worked again with Pegg in an episode in the sitcom Spaced with Mark Gatiss, both of whom played two Matrix-style government agents, and in the comedy film Hot Fuzz where he played Sergeant Tony Fisher.

Eldon has appeared on stage and screen with the comedian Bill Bailey; they performed as a spoof of the German band Kraftwerk, singing German versions of the "Hokey Cokey" and The Wurzels song "The Combine Harvester" for the recorded version of Bill Bailey's Part Troll comedy tour, along with two others (John Moloney and Martin Trenaman). He played the same role in Bailey's 2007 Tinselworm tour, Channel 4's Comedy Gala in 2010, and Bailey's 2010 Dandelion Mind tour.

In late 2006, Eldon, with Bill Bailey, helped to organise and produce a short tour and a West End run of Pinter's People at the Haymarket Theatre, London. The show was a collection of sketches written by Harold Pinter, also starring Geraldine McNulty and Sally Phillips. They appeared together again when Eldon was a panellist on Never Mind the Buzzcocks in 2007 (with Bailey as team captain), as well as on the Dave show Alan Davies: As Yet Untitled. They also acted together in the sitcom Black Books "Grapes of Wrath" episode, where Eldon played "The Cleaner". Eldon has also had minor guest starring roles in numerous comedy projects, including Smack the Pony, Green Wing, The IT Crowd and The Kennedys.

In February 2010, Eldon appeared in the pilot for a "sort-of-sketch-show" called Missing Scene. In 2011 he appeared in sketches throughout How TV Ruined Your Life, and with Paul Whitehouse, as one of a pair of women 1950s typists in season four of Harry and Paul. In October 2013, Eldon read his own short story "What do you say?" on the storytelling series Crackanory, an adult-oriented remake of the children's television series Jackanory.

In 2013, Eldon was given a six-part sketch comedy series called It's Kevin, broadcast on BBC Two. The show had many guest stars, mostly comedians that Eldon had already worked with before. Every episode ended with a song, including: "Mobile Phone", sung by the mock Swiss pop duo Popsox played by Eldon and Bill Bailey; "Brad", where the bully character Brad was played by Peter Serafinowicz; and "Pension Rap". Regular characters included the obnoxious poet Paul Hamilton; Stanley Duthorpe, the fictional man from the North of England; and an offensive French musician. These characters also appeared in Eldon's stand-up DVD Kevin Eldon is Titting About. In 2014, Eldon also published a spoof biography of Paul Hamilton titled My Prefect Cousin: A Short Biography of Paul Hamilton, in which he pretends that Hamilton is his own cousin. Big Train writer Arthur Mathews was one of the guest writers for the show.

In October 2008, he played the part of pessimistic, unpopular Big Brother housemate Joplin in Charlie Brooker's five-part E4 horror thriller, Dead Set. He has also appeared in several minor serious roles in British drama shows such as Robin Hood, Utopia, Merlin, Skins, New Tricks and Hustle. In 2016, he appears in the 6th season of the American fantasy drama series, Game of Thrones along with Richard E. Grant as part of a theatre troupe, with Eldon's character portraying a version of Ned Stark. Uncredited appearances include the 2005 film version of Charlie and the Chocolate Factory, playing "Man with Dog" alongside Mark Heap and the 2014 film Cuban Fury, as the neighbour to the main character played by Nick Frost. He has also played an English policeman in Martin Scorsese's 2011 film Hugo. Eldon played the role of Pete in the David Shrigley/Chris Shepherd animation, Who I Am And What I Want, and also of Mick McManus in Tim Plester's short film World of Wrestling in 2007. In 2009, he played the lead role of Arthur in Radio Mania: An Abandoned Work, a stereoscopic 3D film for the BFI, directed by British artists Iain Forsyth and Jane Pollard.

Eldon co-wrote the theme tune, and is script editor for, the children's series Genie in the House. He provided the voice of Penfold in the 2015 revival series of Danger Mouse. He also appeared in the 2015 series of the children's comedy sketch show Horrible Histories as William the Conqueror - performing a parody version of Korean popstar PSY's hit, Gangnam Style called "Norman Style". He has also been a contestant on the gameshow Pointless Celebrities and was the winner in a 2014 episode of Celebrity Mastermind, where his specialist subject was "The Music of The Beatles".

Eldon voiced the character of Frobisher in the 2012 PlayStation Vita game Frobisher Says, and provided voice work for the 2013 indie game Gun Monkeys by Size Five Games.

A Red Dwarf episode in 2016, "Twentica" featured Kevin Eldon as "4 of 27".

He also appeared as Narvi in The Lord of the Rings: The Rings of Power season 2, which first aired on HBO in 2024.

== Radio ==
From 1997 to 1999, Eldon appeared in BBC Radio 1 show, Blue Jam, which was later adapted into the TV series Jam.

In 2001, Eldon appeared in the non-canon Doctor Who four-part webcast series "Death Comes to Time", in which he played Antimony, a companion to the Seventh Doctor.

In 2008, Eldon presented Poets' Tree, a four-part "poetry type programme" for BBC Radio 4, in the character of Paul Hamilton, which was co-written and edited by Stewart Lee. Eldon has also written and starred in a six-part series of monologues as people from different professions, collectively entitled Speakers, broadcast on the London art radio station Resonance FM. He has also appeared in a CERN podcast with Simon Munnery. In 2012 and 2014, he produced his own radio series called Kevin Eldon Will See You Now which aired on Radio 4.

Between 2009 and 2013, Eldon appeared as both Dean the Dwarf and Kreech, the "Right Hand of Darkness" in the BBC Radio 4 parody of the Lord of the Rings Trilogy called ElvenQuest. He has made guest appearances on Radio 4's Fags, Mags and Bags, North by Northamptonshire and The Horne Section. He was also part of 7th series of the tag team interview radio series Chain Reaction. He was interviewed by John Cooper Clarke and he then interviewed Mark Steel.

Between 2016 and 2021, Eldon appeared in four series of Kevin Eldon Will See You Now, a comedy sketch show on BBC Radio 4. He also appeared in Quanderhorn, a science fiction comedy radio series written by Andrew Marshall and Rob Grant. The first series was originally broadcast in the United Kingdom by BBC Radio 4 in 2018, and a second in 2020.

== Filmography ==
=== Film ===
Year	Title	Role	Notes
1999	An American Tail: The Mystery of the Night Monster	Additional Voices	Uncredited
1999	The Comedy Trail: A Shaggy Dog Story	Horse Jockey	TV special
2001	High Heels and Low Lifes	D.C. McGill	
2004	Churchill: The Hollywood Years	Sax Player	Uncredited
2005	Charlie and the Chocolate Factory	Man with Dog	
2007	Hot Fuzz	Sergeant Tony Fisher	
2010	Four Lions	Sniper	
2011	Hugo	Policeman	
2013	Cuban Fury	Neighbour	Uncredited
2016	The Comedian's Guide to Survival	Nick Secker	
2018	Johnny English Strikes Again	MI7 Night Duty Agent	
2019	Eaten by Lions	Ken	
2020	Six Minutes to Midnight	Sergeant Simmons	
2023	Napoleon	Dr Jean-Nicolas Corvisart	

=== Television ===
Year	Title	Role	Notes
1992	Packing Them In	Boyle	8 episodes
1995	Knowing Me, Knowing You with Alan Partridge	Fanny Thomas	Episode: "Knowing Me, Knowing Yule with Alan Partridge"
1995–1996	Fist of Fun	Simon Quinlank / Rod Hull / Various roles	Regular cast
1995–1997	The Sunday Show	Guy Boudelaire / Dr Brebner / Various roles	Regular cast
1997	I'm Alan Partridge	Mike Sampson	Episode: "Towering Alan"
1997–2001	Brass Eye	Various roles	Regular cast
1998–1999	This Morning with Richard Not Judy	Various roles	Regular cast
1998–2002	Big Train	Various roles	Regular cast
2000	Jam	Various roles	Regular cast
2000	Black Books	The Cleaner	Episode: "Grapes of Wrath"
2001	Spaced	Agent	Episode: "Back"
2001	Attention Scum	Various roles	Regular cast
2001	World of Pub	Dodgey Phil	Regular cast
2001	Doctor Who: Death Comes to Time	Antimony	3 episodes
2001	Comedy Lab	Various roles	Episode: "Uncle Rubbish Presents Shit Club" (voice)
2001–2003	Smack the Pony	Various roles	3 episodes
2004	Nighty Night	Terry Tyrrell	Main cast (series 1)
2004	Green Wing	Scissors Bentley	Episode: "Tangled Webs"
2004	I Am Not an Animal	Hugh the Monkey / additional voices	Regular cast
2005	Piccadilly Jim	Wizzy Wisbeach	TV film
2005	Shakespeare's Happy Endings	Shakespeare	TV film
2005	Nathan Barley	Nikolai the Barber	2 episodes
2005	Who I Am and What I Want	Pete	TV short
2005	Funland	The Shadowman	5 episodes
2006	Popetown	Cardinal Two	Regular cast (voice)
2006–2007	Hyperdrive	York	Regular cast
2007	M.I. High	Space Controller	Episode: "Nerd Alert"
2007	The Yellow House	Jacques	TV film
2007	Kombat Opera Presents	Melvynn Bragg	Episode: "The South Bragg Show"
2007	Saxondale	Martin	1 episode
2007	Never Mind the Buzzcocks	Himself	Series 21, episode 6
2007	World of Wrestling	McManus	TV short
2007	Comedy Lab	Various roles	Episode: "Knife&Wife" (voice)
2008	Skins	Manfred	Episode: "Sid"
2008	New Tricks	Dr Neville Moroni	Episode: "Magic Majestic"
2008	Dead Set	Joplin	Regular cast
2009	Robin Hood	Scrope	Episode: "Sins of the Father"
2009	Merlin	Trickler	Episode: "Sweet Dreams"
2009	Stewart Lee's Comedy Vehicle	Various roles	Season 1
2010	Little Crackers	Ron Johnways	Episode: "The Kiss"
2010	Channel 4's Comedy Gala	Himself	TV special
2010	The IT Crowd	French Tech Support	Episode: "Bad Boys"
2011	How TV Ruined Your Life	Various roles	4 episodes
2011	Campus	Doctor	Episode: "Post-Coital"
2011	This is Jinsy	Edery Molt	Episode: "Ool Bat"
2011	North by Northamptonshire	Ken	5 episodes
2011–2015	Matt Hatter Chronicles	Tenoroc	Regular cast (voice)
2012	The Bleak Old Shop of Stuff	Servegood	3 episodes
2012	Hunderby	John Whiffin	4 episodes
2012	Ruddy Hell! It's Harry and Paul	Various roles	8 episodes
2013	It's Kevin	Himself / various roles	Regular cast
2013	Crackanory	Himself	Episode: "Fakespeare & What Do You Say?"
2013	Death Comes to Pemberley	Dr. McFee	3 episodes
2014	Mr. Sloane	Dole Officer	Episode: "Everybody Must Get Sloaned"
2014	Playhouse Presents	Martin	Episode: "Damned"
2014	Utopia	Tony Bradley	1 episode
2014	The Life of Rock with Brian Pern	Lennie Monkton	1 episode
2014	Psychobitches	Witch of Endor	1 episode
2014	Only Connect	Himself – Curiosities	BBC Children in Need special
2014	The Alternative Comedy Experience	Himself	3 episodes
2014	Stewart Lee's Comedy Vehicle, Series 3	Various roles	2 episodes
2015	Brilliantman!	Brilliantman / Ian Hedge	Sky UK special (also writer and associate producer)
2015	Horrible Histories	William the Conqueror	Episode: "Wicked William the Conqueror"
2015	Cradle to Grave	Vicar	1 episode
2015	The Kennedys	Brian	Episode: "Valentine"
2015	Bull	Mr. Mumford	2 episodes
2015	Jekyll and Hyde	Landlord	Miniseries, episode: "Black Dog"
2015–2019	Danger Mouse	Penfold	Voice role; Main cast
2016	Lost Sitcoms: Hancock's Half Hour	John Vere	1 episode
2016	Red Dwarf XI	4 of 27	Episode: "Twentica"
2016	Damned	Martin Bickerstaff	Regular cast
2016–2017	Game of Thrones	Camello / Goldcloak	3 episodes
2017	Gunpowder	Sir Joseph Hawksworth	1 episode
2017	Detectorists	Auctioner	1 episode
2017	Murder On The Blackpool Express	Kevin	TV film
2017	Timewasters	John Logie Baird	1 episode
2018	Inside No. 9	Vince	Episode: "Zanzibar"
2018	EastEnders	Victor	1 episode
2018	Doctor Who	Ribbons	Episode: "It Takes You Away"
2018	The Last Kingdom	Bishop Erkenwald	Season 3
2019	Cavendish	Rollie	Regular cast
2019	Dad's Army: The Lost Episodes	Lance Corporal Jones	3 episodes
2019	Criminal: UK	Michael Walker	1 episode
2019	The Crown	Priest Michael	1 episode
2019–2023	Sanditon	Reverend Hankins	15 episodes
2020	Miss Scarlet and The Duke	Journalist	Episode: “Memento Mori”
2020	Midsomer Murders	Terry 'Groucho' Bellini	Series 20, episode 6: "Send in the Clowns"
2021	Silent Witness	DI Dan Mason	Episode: "Redemption"
2021	Shadow and Bone	The Apparat	2 episodes
2022	Don't Hug Me I'm Scared	Coffin	Episode: "Death"
2022	Trigger Point	Jeff Washington	8 episodes
2023	Death in Paradise	Jeremy Herbert	1 episode
2023	Hijack	Devlin	Recurring role
2024	3 Body Problem	Sir Thomas More	Episode: "Red Coast"
2024	My Lady Jane	Dr. Butts	
2024	The Lord of the Rings: The Rings of Power	Narvi	Season 2
2026	The Witness	DCI Mick Wickerson	
2026	Bill's Included	Drew	
2026	Living the Dream		

=== Video games ===
Year	Title	Role	Notes
2011	Arthur Christmas	Elf	

== Releases ==
- Kevin Eldon is Titting About (2010) DVD
- Mr Bartlett and Mr Willis (2010) CD
