= Paul Putner =

English actor and comedian

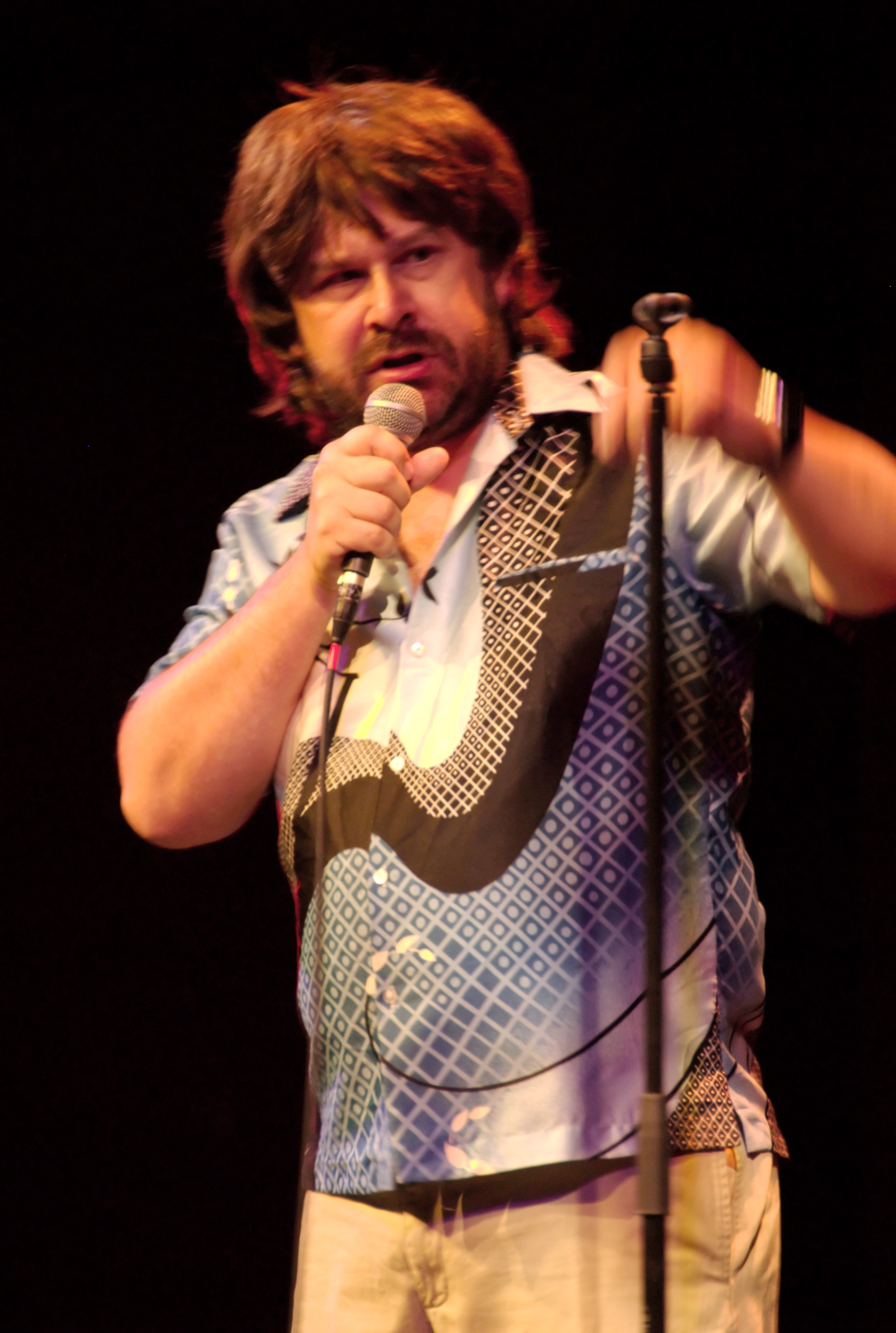
- Paul Putner in 2007 (performing his Earl Stevens character)
- Born: 18 March 1966 (age 60); East Grinstead, Sussex, England

Comedy career
- Medium: Stand-up comedy, film, television

Paul Putner (born 18 March 1966) is an English actor and comedian.

== Life and career ==
Putner was born in March 1966 in East Grinstead, West Sussex. He studied at LAMDA where he won the Kenneth More prize for comedy acting.

His first significant TV role saw Putner as numerous characters in The Glam Metal Detectives shown on BBC2. His real break in comedy came after he set up the club The Regency Rooms with fellow performers Steve Furst and Oliver Darly. The club developed a cult following and was attended by many comics. Richard Herring saw Paul performing there and cast him in his play Punk's Not Dead at the Edinburgh Festival Fringe. This role led to many others including TV roles in Lee and Herring's shows.

In 2001, Putner wrote and performed in the comedic stage show Earl Stevens at the Edinburgh Fringe Festival.

He has appeared in numerous British TV and radio shows, including This Morning with Richard Not Judy (1998), Sir Bernard's Stately Homes (1999), Spaced (1999), Rock Profile (2000), The Day the Music Died (2004–2007), Look Around You (2004) and Little Britain (2003–2005).

Putner appeared in a minor role as a zombie in the comedy film Shaun of the Dead in 2004, and could also be heard on the zombies' 'commentary' track on the DVD release. More recently he has appeared in the BBC Radio 4 science fiction comedy Nebulous (2005), Peacefully in their Sleeps on Radio 4 in 2007, The Peter Serafinowicz Show in 2007 and Stewart Lee's Comedy Vehicle in 2009 and 2014.

He has also contributed material to programmes including The Impressionable Jon Culshaw, Little Britain, The Peter Serafinowicz Show and is a co-creator of the website "TV Dregs".

In 2005, Putner took the starring role (as a mime) in the 7th district section of the film Paris, je t'aime written and directed by Sylvain Chomet. The film opened the "Un Certain Regard" section of the 2006 Cannes Film Festival. From late 2005 until early 2007 Putner toured in the Little Britain Live show, and later appeared in Matt Lucas and David Walliams' TV follow-up, Come Fly with Me. In 2010 and 2011, Putner played the ill-fated Gerald "Jelly" Kelly in the Only Fools and Horses prequel trilogy, Rock & Chips, written by John Sullivan.

In 2013, he appeared in Kevin Eldon's sketch show, It's Kevin and an episode of the second series of Wizards vs Aliens as a troll called Mervyn.

Since then, Paul Putner has also appeared in many other TV/radio productions including: Kevin Eldon Will See You Now, Cabin Pressure, Up the Women, Pompidou, The Borgias, Downton Abbey, Urban Myths, The Nightmare Worlds of H. G. Wells, Call the Midwife and Miss Scarlet and The Duke.
