= Gut Symmetries =

1997 novel by Jeanette Winterson

- First edition
- Author: Jeanette Winterson
- Language: English
- Publisher: Granta Books
- Publication date: 1997
- Pages: 240
- ISBN: 1-86207-000-8

Gut Symmetries is a 1997 novel by the British literary writer Jeanette Winterson, exploring themes of human relationships and physics.

== Plot ==
The book deals with a love triangle between Alice (a young British physicist), Jove (who is a male physicist at Princeton), and Jove's wife Stella; Alice has relationships with both of them. The title relates to the GUTs (grand unified theories) of quantum physics and cosmology, and the symmetries they involve.

== Critical reaction ==
Audrey Bilver in the LA Times found it challenging but worth the effort, saying like a "kind of walking meditation, the book asks us to think our way toward insights that only our guts can know and to feel our way toward mysteries that lie beyond our analytical minds". Bruce Bawer in the New York Times also found it a hard read despite its short length but praised it for Winterson's "fresh, vivid way of putting things". Chris Kridler in the Baltimore Sun was less positive, noting that while it aimed for the gut it dazzled the intellect but went no further.
