= Stewart Lee's Comedy Vehicle =

British TV series (2009–2016)

- Genre: Comedy
- Created by: Stewart Lee
- Directed by: Tim Kirkby
- Starring: Stewart Lee Other performers: Stephen K. Amos; Job Angus; Cathryn Bradshaw; Gail Brand; Arnold Brown; Eugene Cheese; Justin Edwards; Kevin Eldon; Tara Flynn; Armando Iannucci; Paul Jerricho; Miles Jupp; Tony Law; Paul Merton; Simon Munnery; Paul Putner; Michael Redmond; Jerry Sadowitz; Will Smith; Sarah Thom; Tim Vine; Chris Morris
- Voices of: Peter Serafinowicz
- Opening theme: "Tom Hark" by Elias and His Zig-Zag Jive Flutes (series 1)
- Country of origin: United Kingdom
- Original language: English
- No. of series: 4
- No. of episodes: 24

Production
- Executive producers: Armando Iannucci (series 1 only); Mark Freeland (series 2 and 3 only)
- Producer: Richard Webb
- Running time: 30 minutes
- Production company: BBC Productions

Original release
- Network: BBC Two
- Release: 16 March 2009 – 7 April 2016

Stewart Lee's Comedy Vehicle is a British comedy series created by and starring Stewart Lee and broadcast on BBC Two. It features stand-up comedy and sketches united by a theme for each episode. It was script-edited by Chris Morris and was initially executive-produced by Armando Iannucci, marking a rare reformation of a creative team formed for On the Hour in 1991. Lee had said that this is exactly the sort of show he wanted to do, saying "I don't want to do any television that I don't have complete control of."

The first series aired in 2009, with subsequent series in 2011, 2014 and 2016. Stewart Lee announced in May 2016 that the BBC had declined to make any further series. This was due primarily to cuts to BBC Two's comedy budget, which would focus instead solely on scripted comedy.

== Format ==
The bulk of the show is a Stewart Lee stand-up comedy performance, recorded live at the Mildmay Club in Stoke Newington with a club audience. Usually two episodes of the show were recorded per evening. Each episode has a theme, which Lee performs with his material. The stand-up is punctuated with sketches, written by Lee but usually performed by Kevin Eldon and Paul Putner with cameos from other TV and circuit comedians. From series 2, the sketches were removed in favour of a short film at the end of each episode. An element of the programme is the "hostile interrogator", played by Armando Iannucci in the second series and by Chris Morris in Series 3 and 4. In a darkened room, the interrogator quizzes Lee about his approach to stand-up comedy and his attitudes toward his audience and the comedy industry. In Series 1, the interrogator segments (with Iannucci and Johnny Vegas as interrogators) were not included in the main programme, accessed instead via the BBC Red Button and included on the DVD releases as bonus features. The interrogator segments were integrated into the main body of the show by Series 2. The opening theme tune to Series 1 is "Tom Hark" by Elias & His Zig-Zag Jive Flutes. From series 2 there is a cold open and no theme tune or title card.

== DVD releases ==
- Series 1 was released on 7 September 2009 as a 2-disc region-2 PAL set. Red-button extras are included.
- Series 2 was released on 20 June 2011 as a single-disc region-2 PAL issue. Red-button extras are absent.
- Series 3 was released on 10 November 2014 as a 2-disc region-2 PAL set. During a promotional run of his A Room with a Stew tour at the Leicester Square Theatre the admission price included a complimentary copy of the DVD.
- Series 4 was released on 10 October 2016 as a 2-disc region-2 PAL set.

== Episodes ==
=== Series overview ===
Series	Episodes	Originally released	
Series	Episodes	First released	Last released
1	6	16 March 2009	20 April 2009
2	6	4 May 2011	8 June 2011
3	6	1 March 2014	5 April 2014
4	6	3 March 2016	7 April 2016

=== Series 1 ===
Series 1 was broadcast on BBC Two between 16 March to 20 April 2009.

No. overall	No. in series	Title	Guest cast	Original release date
1	1	"Toilet Books"	Job Angus, Kevin Eldon, Tara Flynn, Miles Jupp, Tony Law, Simon Munnery, Paul Putner, Michael Redmond	16 March 2009
Stewart looks at the phenomenon of "celebrity hardbacks" with reference to Asher D; BBC Radio 1 DJ Chris Moyles; comedian Russell Brand; and author Dan Brown. This episode includes two jokes written by Simon Munnery.
2	2	"Television"	Cathryn Bradshaw, Justin Edwards, Kevin Eldon, Miles Jupp, Simon Munnery, Paul Putner, Will Smith	23 March 2009
Stewart considers the television industry and makes reference to The March of the Penguins; Only Fools and Horses; Adrian Chiles; Lord Reith; and the mallard duck. This episode includes a joke written by Bridget Christie.
3	3	"Political Correctness"	Stephen K. Amos, Cathryn Bradshaw, Kevin Eldon, Tara Flynn, Paul Putner, Sarah Thom	30 March 2009
Stewart takes a look at political correctness via The Village People, Animal Farm, Weightwatchers, Kofi Annan and Nazism. Some material in this episode first appeared in 41st Best Stand-up Ever.
4	4	"Global Financial Crisis"	Cathryn Bradshaw, Arnold Brown, Eugene Cheese, Kevin Eldon, Tara Flynn, Miles Jupp, Simon Munnery, Paul Putner, Sarah Thom, Tim Vine	6 April 2009
Stewart explores the 2008 financial crisis via Woolworths, Zavvi and MFI.
5	5	"Comedy"	Stephen K. Amos, Gail Brand, Kevin Eldon, Tony Law, Simon Munnery, Paul Putner	13 April 2009
Stewart analyses a comedy record by Franklyn Ajaye. This episode was intended to be the last in the series of six but was transmitted early, so as to not broadcast the "Religion" episode on Easter Monday. It appears as the last episode on the DVD release of the series.
6	6	"Religion"	Stephen K. Amos, Kevin Eldon, Paul Jerricho, Miles Jupp, Paul Merton, Simon Munnery, Paul Putner, Jerry Sadowitz, Sarah Thom	20 April 2009
Stewart looks at religion and makes references to The Jesus Lizard, The Jesus and Mary Chain, Jim'll Fix It, Laurel and Hardy, Study after Velázquez's Portrait of Pope Innocent X and Abu Hamza al-Masri. The name "Arch Stanton" mentioned in this episode comes from the movie The Good, The Bad And The Ugly but appears to hold no significance to the sketch in which it was featured. The episode features a developed version of a routine about Catholicism from Lee's 2005 show 90s Comedian and the opening line first appeared in Lee's '90s stand-up act.

=== Series 2 ===
Series 2 was filmed between 11 and 14 January 2011; aired from 4 May to 8 June 2011. It features Armando Iannucci as the hostile interrogator. Six lines in the series were written by Bridget Christie, Simon Munnery and Tim Richardson.

No. overall	No. in series	Title	Guest cast	Original release date
7	1	"Charity"	Arnold Brown, Robert Thirtle	4 May 2011
Stewart sets out to explore some ideas about charity, but gets sidetracked and ends up talking mostly about his grandfather and crisps.
8	2	"London"	—	11 May 2011
Stewart looks at metrocentrism, the countryside, quality of life and what happens to Londoners who move to the countryside.
9	3	"Charity"	—	18 May 2011
The comedian returns to the theme of charity after failing to address it in the first episode of the series. He asks whether charity is a moral obligation, and how much money millionaires like Russell Howard should donate.
10	4	"Stand Up"	Nick Pynn (banjo)	25 May 2011
Stewart Lee talks about stand-up comedy while sitting down and threatens to play a guitar to accompany his routine.
11	5	"Identity"	Alan Moore	1 June 2011
Stewart Lee looks at the notion of identity and how different nations define themselves.
12	6	"Democracy"	Nick Pynn (at the fiddle)	8 June 2011
Stewart Lee moves on to the subject of democracy, revealing an extraordinary story from his time at Oxford University in the mid-1980s.

=== Series 3 ===
Series 3 was filmed between 17 and 19 December 2013; and aired from 1 March 2014. It introduced Chris Morris as the hostile interrogator.

No. overall	No. in series	Title	Guest cast	Original release date
13	1	"Shilbottle"	—	1 March 2014
The award-winning stand-up series returns after a three-year absence, as he ponders some alterations to road signs along the A1 in Northumberland. The background music in the short film at the end of the episode is Ludovico Einaudi's The Earth Prelude.
14	2	"England"	Kevin Eldon, Paul Putner	8 March 2014
Stewart turns his attention to Paul Nuttall of "the UKIPs" and immigration, while Chris Morris quizzes him on his audience control. The background music in the short film at the end of the episode is Don Randi's cover of "Theme from The Fox" by Lalo Schifrin.
15	3	"Satire"	—	15 March 2014
Stewart explains satire, using the examples of Animal Park and Planet of the Apes. A section of the episode is ad-libbed when an audience member leaves the room at an inopportune time. The background music in the short film at the end of the episode is "Assault and Battery" by Hawkwind.
16	4	"Context"	Kevin Eldon, Paul Putner	22 March 2014
Stewart looks at context in comedy and asks whether it is possible to have a context-free word. The background music in the short film at the end of the episode is Frédéric Chopin's "Prelude, Op. 28, No. 4" performed by Martha Argerich
17	5	"London"	Paul Putner	29 March 2014
Stewart Lee wants to talk about national and international property. To keep things funny, he mostly talks about his hatred for dogs. Lee performs the last verse of Harry Champion's "Out Went The Gas".
18	6	"Marriage"	—	5 April 2014
Stew gives us a glimpse into the life of an impotent, vasectomied, 45-year-old functioning alcoholic father of two. The music used in the short film at the end is "Now Ends The Beginning" by The Advisory Circle.

=== Series 4 ===
Series 4 consists of six episodes, broadcast from 3 March 2016.

No. overall	No. in series	Title	Guest cast	Original release date
19	1	"Wealth"	—	3 March 2016
Stewart reflects on his recent lack of commercial and critical success with respect to The Graham Norton Show and the BAFTA Awards. The music used in the short film at the end is "Pseudo Youth" by Napalm Death.
20	2	"Islamophobia"	Kevin Eldon, Paul Putner	10 March 2016
Stewart attempts to make some Islamophobic comedy, by talking about a Muslim woman sitting on a copy of The Watchtower on a bus. The bus is later occupied by Quakers.
21	3	"Patriotism"	Jon Culshaw	17 March 2016
Stewart talks about his problems with patriotism, by talking about when his pet cat named Jeremy Corbyn had diarrhoea over an English flag, while saluting and singing God Save the Queen. The background music in the short film at the end of the episode is "The Man Comes Around" by Johnny Cash.
22	4	"Death"	—	24 March 2016
Stewart discusses the death of his childhood pet mouse, who bore a resemblance to Dave Hill of the glam rock band Slade. The background music in the short film at the end of the episode is "Hillary" by The Durutti Column and not "I Don't Want to Talk About It" by Everything but the Girl.
23	5	"Migrants"	—	31 March 2016
Stewart starts to talk about the European migrant crisis, his contribution to the relief effort and Rod Liddle but something goes awry.
24	6	"Childhood"	—	7 April 2016
Stewart discusses childhood memories relating to urine.

== Reception ==
Andrew Billen of The Times described the first series as "the most intelligent half hour of stand-up you will see on television this year" and that Lee "has become the master of deadpan stand-up". The Guardian Guide said "Lee's Vehicle feels well overdue, with his brand of bone-dry, spot-on scepticism a refreshing change from the perky, ambitious tones of the Mock the Week brigade [...] it's brilliant." Brian Viner of The Independent said "In my front room, Lee was preaching not so much to the converted, as to an ayatollah. He did so brilliantly, though."

The Guardian named Comedy Vehicle as one of its top ten television highlights of 2009, commenting that it "was the kind of TV that makes you feel like you're not the only one wondering how we came to be surrounded by so much unquestioned mediocrity". One of the show's few negative reviews came in the Sunday Mercury, which stated: "His whole tone is one of complete, smug condescension". Lee subsequently used this line to advertise his next stand-up tour.

Writing about the third series in The Metro, Keith Watson said "It's comedy that makes you stop and think, and there's not enough of it about", awarding the show four out of five stars. Ellen Jones writing in The Independent said "this comedy about comedy would be unforgivably self-indulgent if Lee wasn't just as incisive on every other facet of modern life as he is on his own comedic genius".

== Awards ==
In May 2010, the series was nominated for a BAFTA Television Award for Best Comedy Programme, which was won by The Armstrong & Miller Show. In May 2012, the second series of Comedy Vehicle was nominated for the same award, and won.

At the 2011 British Comedy Awards, the series won the award for Best Comedy Entertainment Programme, and Lee won Best Male Television Comic.
