= It's Kevin =

Television series

- Genre: Comedy
- Created by: Kevin Eldon
- Directed by: Al Campbell
- Starring: Kevin Eldon; Paul Putner
- Country of origin: United Kingdom
- Original language: English
- No. of episodes: 6

Production
- Running time: 30 minutes

Original release
- Network: BBC Two
- Release: 17 March – 28 April 2013

It's Kevin is a British television sketch comedy show, created by and starring the actor and comedian Kevin Eldon. It was screened on BBC Two between March and April 2013.

== Reception ==
Following the first episode, Serena Davies writing for The Telegraph said "what was perhaps surprising about this show was its off-beat charm" and gave the show 4 out of 5 stars. Keith Watson writing for The Metro gave it 3 out of 5 stars adding "any show featuring Bill Bailey in a pink jumpsuit can’t be all bad". Writing for The Mirror, Vikki Stone said "It's like thirty great YouTube clips back to back. It's fresh, original and anarchic".

== Episodes ==
Every episode begins with Eldon singing the same theme tune but with different lyrics and to different visuals. Episode 6 is the only one set somewhere other than the normal studio, with a wild west theme. All the opening songs end with puppets of himself singing "Kevin, Kevin, Kevin" dressed in the same way as him and confetti pouring down from above. The studio is plain white, normally furnished with a sofa that Eldon mainly presents the show from. The sketches in the show are normally linked together by Eldon talking directly to the audience. While Eldon is playing a version of himself, the other main role in the show is Bob the caretaker of the studio played by Paul Putner. A recurring theme is Bob reminiscing about past jobs he's had and normally laments about how he didn't enjoy them.

There are many recurring characters in the show created by Eldon himself that he has also previously used in his stand-up shows and in radio including the punk French singer Adal Dubois, Hitler with the voice of George Martin, the obnoxious poet Paul Hamilton, and a fictional man from the north of England called Stanley Duthorpe. The end of every show features a song sung by Eldon and on occasion with a guest star such as Bill Bailey in "Mobile Phone" and Peter Serafinowicz in "Brad". Other features of the show include a man falling down from the ceiling in the background, the yelling assistant Allison and the science segment called World Wide Wonders presented by Wendy Wilson played by Amelia Bullmore whom Kevin fails to flirt with.

Episode	Sketches	Recurring themes
Episode 1 (17 March 2013)	Drunkard in the Hospital, Fast Talking Egyptians, Love Thy Neighbour, Portuguese Horrible Lottery, Shoulder Millionaires, Stand-up, Fly Psychiatrist, Sandwiches, Shoe Shop penalty, Interactive show, Ben, Under the Sofa	Bob's previous occupation: Butler; Recurring segments: French musician, World Wide Wonders: Soundtrackettes, Hitler with the voice of George Martin, Doctor Sketch, Stanley Duthorpe; Ending song: Mobile Phone by Popsox
Episode 2 (24 March 2013)	Charles Darwin in the Galapagos, Birthday Card to the Queen, The Incredible Moose-Human, WWII plan, Certain Curtains and Amateur Prime Minister magazine adverts, Queuing, Auction House, Rude Foreign Language Singing in Restaurant, Making a Dream Come True, Flower Shop	Throughout the episode: World Record attempt; Bob's previous occupation: National National Museum Gift Shop Museum Museum Gift Shop; Recurring segments: Hitler with the voice of George Martin, Archive Corner: Maureen and John, French musician; Ending song: Pension Rap
Episode 3 (31 March 2013)	Hungover co-workers,"One Giant Leap for Man Kind", Little Chef, Wrists by Parfum de Pom Pom, Cauliflower, a Terminator in Shepard's bush, Amish Sex Pistols, Talking Breakfast, First Phone Call	Throughout the episode: Beefeater Enthusiast; Bob's previous occupation: Dumbing down eloquent footballers; Recurring segments: Doctor Sketch, Stanley Duthorpe, Paul Hamilton: Polish Barmaid poem, World Wide Wonders: Is seeing believing?; Ending song: I Haven't Got a Catchphrase
Episode 4 (7 April 2013)	Men's Hair, Architecture's Office, Italy begging song, Vague Dinner Conversation, Screaming Pillows Advert, Chair & Stick, Bob's office, True Love Tales, Mr. Nerd, Concert Conga player (Nick Frost)	Throughout the episode: The Great Spagboletti; Recurring segments: Doctor's Sketch, Archive Corner: 80's Ken Bleaksdale Drama: All Fall Down, Hitler with the voice of George Martin, Paul Hamilton: Hate Date, World Wide Wonders: T.I.T.S; Ending song: Brad
Episode 5 (21 April 2013)	Offensive Bird, I Hate to Be a King, Fast Forwarding, The Outraged 70s Sitcom Vicars Playoff Final (Paul Whitehouse), Bucket of Water Advert, Old Wives Tales, Reggae Crab in a Tank, Bee, Moments in Art: Hockney, Comedy Duo: Whitstable Al and Adaptable Hal, Comic Strip	Throughout the show: The Perspective Twins; Bob's previous occupation: Buffet Guard; Recurring segments: Doctor's Sketch, Stanley Duthorpe, Paul Hamilton: Roadside Roadside Genocide, French singer; Ending song: Jumping Up and Down
Episode 6 (28 April 2013)	Suggestive Nurse, Close Up Magic, Decisions, Dubstep Stress-Relief, Take-away menus, Fortune Crunchers and Classic Threats magazine advert, Overdue Library book, Standing up Saleem, Perpetual Motion, Kevin's Grandad (Harry Enfield), How a Vacuum Cleaner Works, Tea Lady Flo (Paul Putner)	Throughout the show: Dubstep; Bob's previous occupation: Buffet Guard; Recurring segments: World Wide Wonders: Multiverse, Stanley Duthorpe, Archive Corner: Cavalcade, Doctor's Sketch; Ending song: Lullaby for Bob, by Folk/Dubstep group Eventide

Episode 5 was delayed from 14 April due to BBC2 coverage of live golf.

== Cast ==
The show has featured appearances from many recognisable names in British comedy most of whom he has collaborated with before, including Bill Bailey, Patrick Baladi, Matt Berry, Adam Buxton, Rosie Cavaliero, Bridget Christie, Julia Davis, Simon Day, Justin Edwards, Harry Enfield, James Fleet, Nick Frost, Hattie Hayridge, Rufus Jones, Stewart Lee, Felicity Montagu, Simon Munnery, Paul Putner, Christopher Ryan, Peter Serafinowicz, Dan Renton Skinner, Johnny Vegas and Paul Whitehouse.
