= Cathryn Bradshaw =

British actress (born 1964)

- Born: Cathryn Ann Bradshaw; 13 January 1964 (age 62); Blackpool, Lancashire, England
- Education: Bristol Old Vic Theatre School (1987)
- Occupation: Actress
- Years active: 1989–present
- Spouse(s): Mark Strong (m. 1989; div. ????); Guy Lankester (m. 2001; div. 2006)

Cathryn Bradshaw (born 13 January 1964, Blackpool) is an English actress known for her role in Oranges Are Not the Only Fruit.

== Background ==
Cathryn Bradshaw was born in Blackpool in 1964 and brought up in Poulton-le-Fylde, Lancashire where she attended Breck School. She trained at the Bristol Old Vic Theatre School in Bristol, alongside Louise Plowright and Mark Strong, and graduated in 1987.

She married actor Mark Strong in Lancashire in 1989, but the marriage ended in divorce after only a few years.

== Career ==
Bradshaw's first television role came in 1988 when she played the Princess in an episode of The Storyteller. The following year she appeared in an episode of Inspector Morse ("The Secret of Bay 5B") and in the 1989 comedy musical film, Bert Rigby, You're a Fool alongside Robert Lindsay and Robbie Coltrane.

Then in 1990, she played Melanie in the acclaimed BBC television drama Oranges Are Not the Only Fruit opposite Charlotte Coleman. She also appeared in four episodes of the ITV crime drama Chancer. She made a number of television appearances throughout the 1990s,. In 1996, Bradshaw appeared at the National Theatre in Helen Edmundson's adaptation of Leo Tolstoy's War and Peace, and from 1997 to 1999 she was a member of the Royal Shakespeare Company She has also appeared in Down to Earth and Midsomer Murders.

In 2003, she played Paula in romantic drama film, The Mother opposite Daniel Craig, and in 2004 she played Mary Webb in the BBC musical drama Blackpool. She appeared in two films in 2006. Firstly, the romantic comedy Venus, as Jillian. She appeared in the psychological thriller Like Minds as Helen Colbie. She played Margaret Littlefair in the satirical black comedy television series Suburban Shootout which aired on Five and Paramount Comedy in the United Kingdom. In 2007, she appeared in an episode of the BBC sitcom Lead Balloon.

== Filmography ==
=== Film ===
Year	Title	Role
1989	Bert Rigby, You're a Fool	Laurel Pennington
2003	The Mother	Paula
2006	Venus	Jillian
2006	Like Minds	Helen Colbie

=== Television ===
Year	Title	Role
1988	The Storyteller	Princess
1989	Inspector Morse	Janice
1990	Oranges Are Not the Only Fruit	Melanie
1990	Chancer	Sonya Morris
1990	Portrait of a Marriage	Chambermaid
1991	Boon	Meia
1991	Casualty	Monica Larwood
1992	Agatha Christie's Poirot	Mary Drower
1993	Black Daisies for the Bride	Young Kathleen
1993	Frank Stubbs Promotes	Joanne
1995	The Bill	Anna Fox
1999	People Like Us	
2000	The Tree with the Golden Apples	Marieke (voice)
2003	Down to Earth	Jude
2004	Midsomer Murders	Anne Marr
2004	Peep Show	Dance class leader
2004	Blackpool	Mary Webb
2005	The Last Detective	Vicky Kingwell
2005	The Golden Hour	Beth Stanley
2005	Look at Me I'm Beautiful	Emma Westerly
2006–2007	Suburban Shootout	Margaret Littlefair
2007	Lead Balloon	Sheryl
2009	Stewart Lee's Comedy Vehicle	Various roles
