= Lighthousekeeping =

2004 british novel by Jeanette Winterson

- First UK edition
- Author: Jeanette Winterson
- Language: English
- Genre: Philosophical novel
- Published: 2004
- Publisher: Fourth Estate (UK); Harcourt (US)
- Media type: Print

Lighthousekeeping is a 2004 novel by Jeanette Winterson. The novel depicts the perilous unbalanced psychology of the narrating character Silver, who becomes an apprentice to a lighthouse keeper. and follows in Winterson's typically mythological and metaphorical writing, exploring themes of storytelling, love and history.

The novel received mixed reviews, with some reviewers seeing it as a continuation of Winterson's success of as a literary writer, while others appeared frustrated by her writing.

== Themes ==
Following in Virginia Woolf's metaphor of To the Lighthouse, the novel focuses on the lighthouse metaphor where "the continuous narrative of existence is a lie... there are lit-up moments, and the rest is dark." The novel has both a present-day narrative, and one which flashes back 100 years, exploring the views of Charles Darwin and Robert Louis Stevenson. In this context, The New York Times describes the novel focusing on two themes: storytelling and love.

== Style ==
The novel follows the richness of allegory and metaphor that is evident in much of Winterson's other works, including Oranges Are Not the Only Fruit. New York Times reviewer Benjamin Kunkel, describes novel as doing this too much: "metaphors have altogether slipped free of their sponsoring facts; her figurative language has turned into so many solemn doodles. The novel concentrates the worst qualities of her writing."

The novel is a mix of both exploratory metaphor and stories tolled by Silver's mentor, the lighthouse keeper. The Guardian reviewer Joanna Briscoe thought the first few chapters returned to the best of Winterson writing, describing the novel as a series of "self-contained tales" in which "the flavour of The Shipping News is tangling with The Wolves of Willoughby Chase via Heart of Darkness".

== Critical reception ==
The Guardian reviewer Anita Sethi positively reviewed the novel, highlighting it philosophical and stylistic richness. The review concludes that "the power of Lighthousekeeping is in its stylistic dynamic between holding itself together with the pared-down precision of its language, each word smoothed into a finely polished pebble, and spilling out in the consciousnesses, narratives and disparate times that bleed seamlessly into each other."

The New York Times had a decidedly negative review, noting that Winterson's style of writing takes over the storytelling. The reviewer, Benjamin Kunkel, concludes that in the novel "nothing gets in the way of lyricism or love, and the result is rhapsodic inconsequence and vacuous romantic uplift." The Guardian reviewer Joanna Briscoe reaches a similar conclusion, calling the novel "a flawed return to form". Within some of this critique, Briscoe still finds some positives about the novel, saying that Winterson is "a true innovator of form" and that the novel is "not only to be admired, but enjoyed."
