= The World and Other Places =

Collection of short stories

First edition (publ. Jonathan Cape)

The World and Other Places is a collection of short stories by Jeanette Winterson O.B.E in the style of postmodernism.

Some of the contained short stories have been previously published in well known publications, such as The New Yorker. Winterson, like other postmodernists, plays with her words so they carry multiple layers and interpretation. She writes in short sentences and short fragments without obvious transitions. This collection questions the nature of narrative. The stories escape reality and often narrative conventions (one of the stories may be narrated by a dead character). Sexuality is often of particular importance with Winterson's stories, particularly "The Poetics of Sex" which concerns itself with a lesbian relationship from beginning to end, framed by the public awareness of lesbians. It was published in hardcover by Jonathan Cape in 1998 in the UK and by Alfred A. Knopf the following year in the US.

== Short stories included ==
- "The 24-Hour Dog"
- "Atlantic Crossing"
- "The Poetics of Sex"
- "The Three Friends"
- "Orion"
- "Lives of Saints"
- "O'Brien's First Christmas"
- "The World and Other Places"
- "Disappearance I"
- "Disappearance II"
- "The Green Man"
- "Turn of the World"
- "Newton"
- "Holy Matrimony"
- "A Green Square"
- "Adventure of a Lifetime"
- "Psalms"

== Prior publication ==
- "The Three Friends" in Columbia
- "O'Brien's First Christmas" in Elle
- "Adventure of a Lifetime" in Esquire
- "Orion" in Granta and Home Issue
- "The Poetics of Sex" in Granta and Best of Young British Writers
- "Psalms" in New Statesman
- "The Green Man" and "Disappearance I" (originally titled "Tough Girls Don't Dream") in The New Yorker
- "Newton" appeared in the book The New Gothic edited by Patrick McGrath and Bradford Morrow
- "Atlantic Crossing" was broadcast on BBC Radio

== Reception ==
Kirkus Reviews gave a positive review, writing "Though this first collection is brief, its author’s talent isn’t. Winterson’s appetite for social criticism mingles confidently with her lyrical instinct to give us savagely rhythmic portraits of people lost in lives they’d much rather not have to inhabit." Reviewers for Library Journal called the stories "challenging and beautifully crafted".
