= The Passion (novel) =

1987 novel by Jeannette Winterson

- First edition (publ. Bloomsbury Press)
- Author: Jeanette Winterson
- Language: English
- Publication date: 1987

The Passion is a 1987 novel by British novelist Jeanette Winterson. The novel depicts a young French soldier in the Napoleonic army during 1805 as he takes charge of Napoleon's personal larder. The novel won the John Llewellyn Rhys Prize. Publication and subsequent sales of the novel allowed Winterson to stop working other jobs, and support herself as a full-time writer.

Though nominally a historical novel, Winterson takes considerable liberties with the depiction of the historical setting and various strategies for interpreting the historical—making the novel historiographic metafiction. The novel also explores themes like passion, constructions of gender and sexuality, and broader themes common to 1980s and 1990s British fiction. Parts of the novel are set in Venice—Winterson had yet to visit the city when she wrote about it, and the depiction was entirely fictional.

== Plot ==
The novel opens with a section narrated by Henri, a young French man who has joined Napoleon's army and become Napoleon's personal chef at one of the camps. After describing the dismal conditions of the soldiers' camp, and the gluttony of Napoleon, more about Henri's backstory is revealed as he reflects on his life and the passion that Napoleon had inspired which led him to join the army.

After Henri and his companions participate in the French invasion of Russia, two of them decide to desert, along with one of the vivandieres (prostitutes) that was accompanying the army. The young woman, Villanelle, helps them to gain assistance from Russian villagers, and they eventually make their way back to Venice, Villanelle's home city.

The novel dives into Villanelle's backstory, revealing that she previously worked in a casino, had fallen in love and had an affair with a married noblewoman, and ended up accepting a deal to marry a violent man who then traded her into prostitution. When her ex-husband attempts to murder her, Henri kills him, and is imprisoned in a stony prison near Venice.

Throughout the novel, Henri's and Villanelle's approaches to passion and love are contrasted. While Henri comes from a small French Catholic village, regarded as mediocre, whose hearts were only set on fire by Napoleon, Villanelle's hometown of Venice is described as a people conversant with passion, who play with chance and desire deftly, but without real commitment.

== Reception ==
Kirkus Reviews described the novel as "fascinating" and demonstrating "considerable powers" comparing the novel to the works of Robertson Davies.

On 5 November 2019, BBC News listed The Passion on its list of the 100 'most inspiring' novels.
