= Oranges Are Not the Only Fruit (1990 serial) =

- Charlotte Coleman and Geraldine McEwan in Oranges Are Not the Only Fruit
- Created by: Jeanette Winterson
- Directed by: Beeban Kidron
- Starring: Charlotte Coleman; Geraldine McEwan; Kenneth Cranham; Cathryn Bradshaw
- Opening theme: Rachel Portman
- Country of origin: United Kingdom
- Original language: English
- No. of episodes: 3

Production
- Producer: Phillippa Giles
- Running time: 165 minutes

Original release
- Network: BBC Two
- Release: 10 January – 24 January 1990

Oranges Are Not the Only Fruit is a 1990 three-part BBC television drama, directed by Beeban Kidron. Jeanette Winterson wrote the screenplay, adapting her semi-autobiographical first novel of the same name (published 1985). The BBC produced and screened three episodes, running to a total of 2 hours and 45 minutes. A 145-minute continuous version was screened at the London Film Festival on 25 November 1989. The series was released on DVD in 2005.

The series won the BAFTA award for Best Drama Series or Serial.

== Storyline ==
Charlotte Coleman starred as Jess, a girl growing up in a Pentecostal evangelical household in Accrington, Lancashire, England in the 1970s, who comes to understand that she is a lesbian. The allegorical fairytales that are woven into the novel do not appear on the screen. Miss Jewsbury's love-making with the underage Jess, which appears in the novel, was also excluded. Even with these cuts, the series caused controversy when shown due to the remaining lesbian sex scenes and its portrayal of the Elim Pentecostal faith.

== Cast ==
- Jess – Charlotte Coleman
- Small Jess – Emily Aston
- Jess's mother – Geraldine McEwan
- Pastor Finch – Kenneth Cranham
- William – Peter Gordon
- Cissy – Barbara Hicks
- Elsie – Margery Withers
- May – Elizabeth Spriggs
- Mrs Green – Freda Dowie
- Miss Jewsbury – Celia Imrie
- Jess's real mum – Sophie Thursfield
- Mrs Arkwright – Pam Ferris
- Mrs Virtue – Katy Murphy
- Mrs Vole – Sharon Bower
- Doctor – David Thewlis
- Gypsy – Kay Clayton
- Church Pianist – Tamar Swade
- Melanie – Cathryn Bradshaw
- Graham – Richard Henders
- Katy – Tania Rodrigues
- Nurse – Suzanne Hall

== Critical reception ==
Los Angeles Times, "A beguiling BBC drama."

The New York Times, "It's a fresh, challenging and memorable little movie."

== Awards ==
The series won the BAFTA award for Best Drama Series or Serial, and another for Film Sound. Geraldine McEwan also won the BAFTA for Best Actress.

In 1991, via the PBS network, the series won the GLAAD Media Award for Outstanding TV Movie or Limited Series.

In 2010, The Guardian ranked the miniseries at number 8 in their list of "The Top 50 TV Dramas of All Time".

Preceded by Mother Love	British Academy Television Awards; Best Drama Series or Serial; 1991	Succeeded by Inspector Morse
