= The Stone Gods (novel) =

2007 novel by Jeanette Winterson

- First edition
- Author: Jeanette Winterson
- Publisher: Hamish Hamilton
- Publication date: 2007
- Pages: 224
- ISBN: 0-241-14395-0

The Stone Gods is a novel written by Jeanette Winterson. Published in the year 2007, the novel is a post-apocalyptic, postmodern, dystopian love story, with themes of corporate government control, the harshness of war, artificial intelligence, and technology. The novel is self-referential as characters make inter-textual references, while certain characters’ story arcs repeat. The novel aims to warn against history's tendency to repeat itself, as well as humanity's inability to learn from past mistakes.

== A novel in four parts ==
- "Planet Blue" – Set in a futuristic past where humanity's destruction of its homeworld, Orbus, seems to be inevitable, they discover and terraform another viable planet.
- "Easter Island" – Set in the 18th century, when Easter Island's inhabitants destroyed many of the moai statues, and the last tree, on their island.
- "Post-3War" – Set in "Tech City" after World War III, with Billie educating Spike, a Robo sapiens.
- "Wreck City" – Once again set in the "Tech City", now a derelict, trash-ridden city where those abandoned by the corporate-controlled society struggle to survive.

== Reception ==
Ursula Le Guin, while criticizing exposition and sentimentality, thought the novel a worthwhile and cautionary tale. Andrew Milner, a literary critic and author of Science Fiction and Climate Change, notes that this book is an early example of 'doomer' climate fiction.
