= Rudolf Vleeskruijer =

Dutch linguist

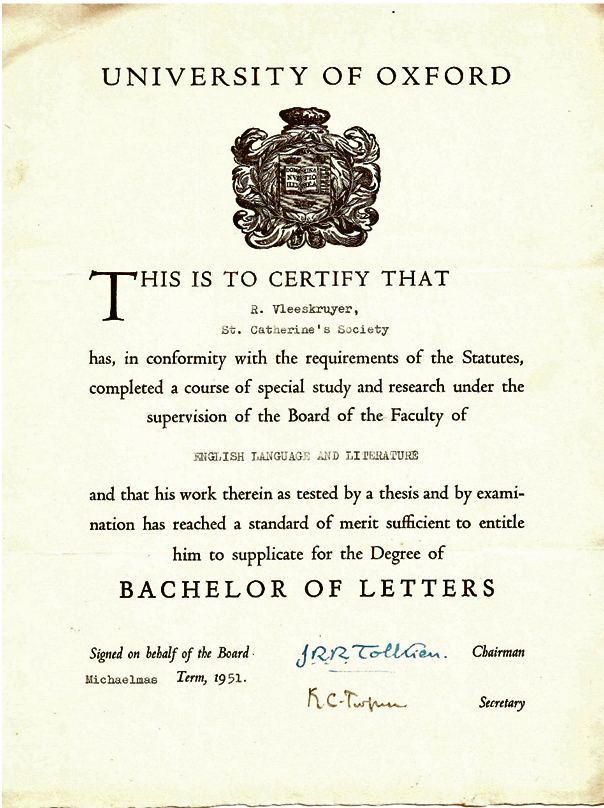
Degree Rudolf Vleeskruijer (B.Litt.Oxon), signed by J.R.R. Tolkien

Rudolf Vleeskruijer (also spelled as Vleeskruyer) (Amsterdam, 18 January 1916 - Zeist, 2 June 1966) was a Dutch professor in the English language and Old English literature at the Utrecht University.

Vleeskruijer spent a part of his youth (1924 to 1929) in England. From August 1945 to May 1946, he was an interpreter for the Allied Forces as a conscript NCO in the Dutch Army.

He studied English at the University of Amsterdam and received his bachelor's degree on 17 July 1941. After obtaining his master's degree on 29 June 1948, he took up a study in 1949 at the University of Oxford (St. Catherine College). Vleeskruijer was granted the title B.lett.Oxon (Bachelor of Letters Oxoniensis) at this university by J. R. R. Tolkien in 1951.

In 1958, he founded the English Institute of the University of Utrecht. Vleeskruijer was married and had three children.

He died at age 50 in Zeist. In 1966, he was commemorated in an article in English Studies, A Journal of English language and Literature

== Bibliography ==
- A. Campbell's Views on Inguaeonic Neophilologus xxxii, pp. 173–183 (1948)
- Old English Vocabulary Research (lecture) Acts of the 22nd Congress of Philologists of the Netherlands (1952), pp. 46 sqq.
- Recent Work at Leeds in Neophilologus xxxvii (1953), pp. 174–175
- The Life of St. Chad, an Old English Homily edited with introduction, notes, illustrative texts and glossary, North-Holland, Amsterdam (1953)
- Chaucer and the Modern Reader (lecture) Acts of the 24th Congress of Philologists of the Netherlands (1956), pp. 57 sqq.
- Anglistik en English Philology - Rede uitgesproken bij de aanvaarding van het ambt van gewoon hoogleraar in de Engelse taal en de oudere Engelse letterkunde aan de Rijksuniversiteit te Utrecht op 6 october 1958, Noord-Hollandsche uitgeversmaatschappij, Amsterdam (inaugural oration, 1958)
