= Jeanette Winterson =

English writer (born 1959)

Jeanette Winterson CBE FRSL
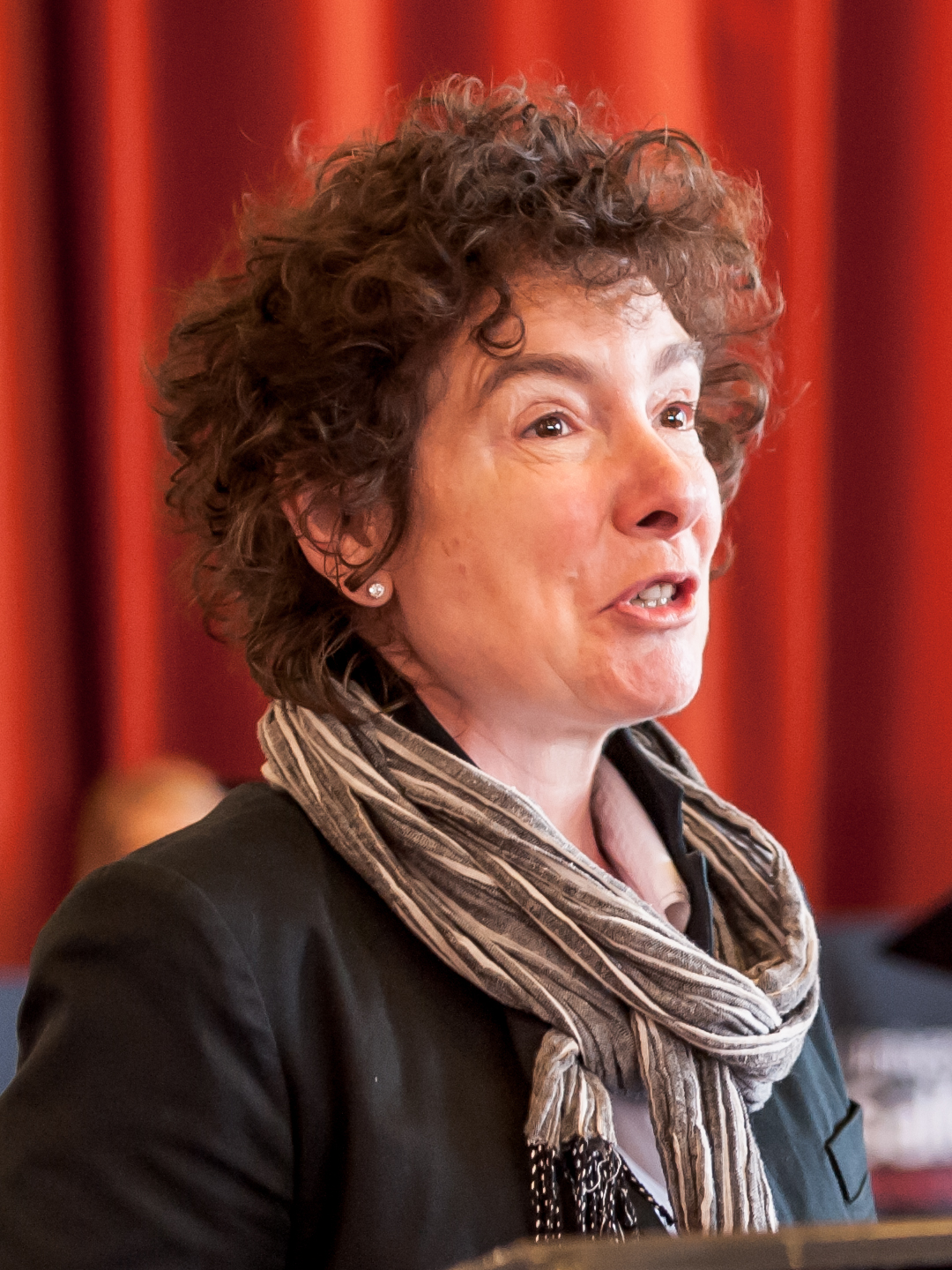
- Winterson in 2015
- Born: 27 August 1959 (age 67); Manchester, England, UK
- Education: St. Catherine's College, Oxford
- Occupations: Writer, journalist, Professor at the University of Manchester
- Spouse: Susie Orbach (m. 2015; sep. 2019)
- Partner(s): Peggy Reynolds (1990–2002)
- Writing career
- Period: 1985–present
- Genres: Fiction, children's fiction, journalism, science fiction
- Notable work: Oranges Are Not the Only Fruit
- Jeanette Winterson's voice from the BBC programme Bookclub, 4 April 2010.
- Website: www.jeanettewinterson.com

Jeanette Winterson CBE FRSL (born 27 August 1959) is an English author. Her first book, Oranges Are Not the Only Fruit, was a semi-autobiographical novel about a lesbian growing up in an English Pentecostal community. Other novels explore gender and sexual identity, and her later ones the relations between humans and technology. Her novels have been translated into almost 20 languages. She also broadcasts and teaches creative writing.

Winterson has won a Whitbread Prize for a First Novel, a BAFTA Award for Best Drama, the John Llewellyn Rhys Prize, the E. M. Forster Award and the St. Louis Literary Award, and the Lambda Literary Award twice. She has received an Officer of the Order of the British Empire (OBE) and a Commander of the Order of the British Empire (CBE) for services to literature, and is a Fellow of the Royal Society of Literature.

== Early life and education ==
Jeanette Winterson (born Janet) was born in Manchester on 27 August 1959. Her birth mother, who came from Blackley, was a machinist in a factory. She gave birth to Winterson when she was 17, and looked after her for the first six weeks of her life in a mother and baby home.

On 21 January 1960, Jeanette was adopted by Constance and John William Winterson (aged 37 and 40), and brought home to 200 Water Street, Accrington, Lancashire. John was a war veteran, then road mender, then worked at a power station shovelling coal, and at some point also worked in a television factory. Constance was a clerk, but stopped working when she adopted Jeanette. The couple were both Pentecostal evangelical Christians.

Winterson grew up in Accrington, and was raised in the Elim Pentecostal Church. She was raised to become a Pentecostal Christian missionary, and began evangelising and writing sermons at an early age.

Winterson was taught to read by her adoptive mother through the Book of Deuteronomy, and credits the Bible as teaching her a love for storytelling. There were only six books in the Winterson home, and Constance did not want her to have any secular influences. Winterson read in secret. At one point, her adoptive mother found her books and burnt them. She came to learn about writing by reading 'English literature in Prose A-Z' in Accrington public library.

Winterson attended Accrington Girls' Grammar School. Winterson did not do well at her O Levels – failing four, and passing five. Her school then became a comprehensive school without a sixth form, as part of Labour's education policy at the time. She attended a technical college for her A Levels. Alongside this, she worked at the market in the evening and on Saturdays.

At 16, Winterson fell in love with a girl she had converted to her church. In the same year, she was found out and left home. When she left home, she had nowhere to live so lived in her Mini. Soon after, she attended Accrington and Rossendale College. She supported herself through her A-levels by driving an ice-cream van, working at a funeral parlour and a mental health hospital.

From 1978 to 1981, Winterson supported herself doing odd jobs while reading English Literature at St. Catherine's College, Oxford. There, she met life-long friend and actor, Vicky Licorish.

== Career ==
=== Writing ===
==== Oranges Are Not the Only Fruit (1985) and TV adaptation (1990) ====
After she moved to London, Winterson took assorted theatre work, including at the Roundhouse. Winterson applied for a job as an editorial assistant at Pandora Press, a feminist imprint newly founded in 1983 by Philippa Brewster. In 1985, Brewster published Oranges Are Not the Only Fruit, Winterson's first novel; a semi-autobiographical story about a lesbian girl growing up in a Pentecostal community. She wrote the book by hand, mainly in the Reading Room of the British Museum. It won the Whitbread Prize for a First Novel.

In 1989, Winterson was asked by the BBC to script her novel into a three-part drama. Released in 1990, Winterson wrote the script for television and it was directed by Beeban Kidron and produced by Philippa Giles. Whilst in the book, the protagonist is called Jeanette, she decided to call her Jess in the TV adaptation, as she did not want for people to assume it portrayed purely factual information about herself. The series won a BAFTA for best drama and for Film Sound. It also won RTS awards, and Winterson won an award for scriptwriting at Cannes. Geraldine McEwan, who played the protagonist's adoptive mother, also won the BAFTA for best actress.

In 1994, Winterson wrote the TV film Great Moments in Aviation, also directed by Kidron.

In 2025, it was announced that the Royal Shakespeare Company was adapting Oranges Are Not The Only Fruit into a musical. The novel is also an English exam text.

==== Later writing ====
Winterson describes her writing as having a political purpose: "My aim in writing is never just to give pleasure. Art isn't a luxury product. It's always about trying to change people's lives."

Winterson has said her influences include the Modernists: Virginia Woolf, T. S. Eliot and Gertrude Stein; European writers: Calvino, Borges, Perec, Rabelais. Her favourite Shakespeare play is The Winter's Tale. She often alludes to, or explicitly adapts other literary texts. As she says: "I tend to work obsessively with texts, I embed them in my work."

Many of Winterson's novels have been made into audiobooks. One notable omission is Written on the Body, which features a gender-neutral narrator, referred only to as "they".

==== 1980s and 90s ====
Winterson's 1987 novel The Passion was set in Napoleonic Europe.

==== 2000 to present ====
In 2000, Winterson published The Powerbook, a novel set across Paris, Capri and cyberspace. After a period of quiet, Winterson described it as "a gaudy, baroque, extravagant book, packing in everything I'd learned and felt since Oranges; crossing time, altering gender, refusing linear connections. I'd found myself and my voice again." In 2002, Winterson's stage adaptation of The Powerbook opened at the Royal National Theatre, London.

Winterson wrote her two children's books The King of Capri (2003) and Tanglewreck (2006) for her godchildren.

In 2006, Winterson was awarded an OBE for services to literature.

In 2007, Winterson published The Stone Gods, a sci-fi novel where each of the four sections of the book end in death.

In 2009, Winterson donated the short story "Dog Days" to Oxfam's Ox-Tales project, covering four collections of UK stories by 38 authors. Her story appeared in the Fire collection. She also supported the relaunch of the Bush Theatre in London's Shepherd's Bush. She wrote and performed work for the Sixty Six Books project, based on a chapter of the King James Bible, along with other novelists and poets including Paul Muldoon, Carol Ann Duffy, Anne Michaels and Catherine Tate.

In 2011, Winterson published her memoir, Why Be Happy When You Can Be Normal? The memoir misses out twenty-five years of Winterson's life, between her first year at university and 2007.

Winterson was the first writer commissioned to produce a novella for Hammer (a film studio producing horror films) in collaboration with Arrow Books (part of Random House). It was announced that it would be published in the summer of 2011. However, Winterson's novella The Daylight Gate, based on the 1612 Pendle Witch Trials, appeared on their 400th anniversary in 2012. Its main character, Alice Nutter, is based on the real-life woman of the same name. The Guardian's Sarah Hall describes the novel as: "the squalor, inequality and religious eugenics. The subjugation of women and prostituting of children. The degloving and castration of Catholics. Poverty. Sickness. Desperation."

In 2013, Winterson chaired the Forward Prize for Poetry alongside actor Sam West, journalist David Mills and poets Paul Farley and Sheenagh Pugh.

In 2013, it was announced that Winterson would be writing an adaptation of The Winter's Tale for the Hogarth Shakespeare series, a series of modern retellings of Shakespeare plays by well-known authors. She wrote The Gap of Time, published in 2015 by Vintage.

In 2016, Winterson published a book of short stories about Christmas alongside seasonal recipes from her celebrity friends, including Susie Orbach, Kathy Acker and Ruth Rendell.

In 2019, Winterson published her eleventh novel, Frankissstein. The book starts with a description of Mary Shelley writing Frankenstein, then jumps to the present day to describe the character of Ry Shelley, a transgender doctor. The novel explores topics including transhumanism, transgenderism and AI. It was published by Jonathan Cape.

In October 2023, Jonathan Cape published Night Side of the River, a book of thirteen ghost stories.

In 2025, Winterson published One Aladdin Two Lamps, "a dizzying whirligig of memoir, history, philosophy, politics and self-help, loosely tied to commentary on the Nights” (One Thousand and One Nights — a collection of Middle Eastern folk tales).

=== Teaching ===
In 2012, Winterson succeeded Colm Tóibín as Professor of Creative Writing at the University of Manchester. There, she taught both MA and undergraduate students. In 2019, she was still teaching there.

=== Broadcasts and journalism ===
Winterson has produced columns for The Guardian and The Times. She has also produced a range of broadcasts, including Manchester: Alchemical City, a personal exploration of the city of Manchester.

In December 2025, Winterson appeared in the docudrama Titanic Sinks Tonight, aired by BBC Two.

Winterson sees it as a writer's duty to be engaged in politics, and has spoken out on subjects including banking, Tony Blair's government and the Iraq war, fox-hunting, the boycott of Israel in the Gaza-Israel conflict. Winterson has also supported campaigns promoting reading and literature in education, including the 2026 Department for Education initiative, the National Year of Reading. She confessed that she voted for both Margaret Thatcher in 1979 and Tony Blair in 1997, and felt let down by both.

== Awards and recognition ==
- 1985: Whitbread Prize for a First Novel for Oranges Are Not the Only Fruit
- 1987: John Llewellyn Rhys Prize for The Passion
- 1989: E. M. Forster Award for Sexing the Cherry
- 1990: BAFTA Award for Best Drama for Oranges Are Not the Only Fruit TV serial
- 1991: Prix d'Argent, Cannes Film Festival, for Oranges screenplay
- 1994: Winner, Lambda Literary Award for Lesbian Fiction, for Written on the Body
- 1998: International Fiction Award, Mantua
- 2006: Officer of the Order of the British Empire (OBE) in the 2006 New Year Honours, for services to literature
- 2013: Winner, Lambda Literary Award for Lesbian Memoir or Biography, for Why Be Happy When You Could Be Normal?
- 2014: St. Louis Literary Award
- 2016: Chosen as one of BBC's 100 Women.
- 2016: Elected Fellow of the Royal Society of Literature
- 2018: She presented the 42nd Richard Dimbleby Lecture in celebration of 100 years of women's suffrage in the UK
- 2018: Commander of the Order of the British Empire (CBE) in the 2018 Birthday Honours, for services to literature
- 2019: Longlisted for the Booker Prize for Frankissstein: A Love Story

== Personal life ==
=== Adoption ===
In her first year at Oxford university, Winterson returned to see her mother in Accrington for one last Christmas. Her mother died in 1990. Winterson did not attend her funeral, as she felt her mother never forgave her.

After her mother's death, Winterson established a good relationship with her father, who had remarried, and they remained in contact until his death in 2008.

Initially, Winterson did not want to find her birth parents, saying in her memoir: "I was a loner. I was self-invented. I didn't believe in biology or biography. I believed in myself. Parents? What for? Except to hurt you." However, eventually she sought out information about her birth mother. She met with her mother, Ann, at least three times, but had mixed feelings about her which she found difficult.

=== Gender and Sexuality ===
Winterson had her first same-sex relationship aged 16. Aged 15, Winterson fell in love with a girl from church. However, as with the protagonist in Oranges, Winterson's adoptive mother found out and reported her to the church and she was subject to an exorcism which lasted several days.

Winterson's 1987 novel The Passion was inspired by her relationship with Pat Kavanagh, her literary agent who was in a relationship with novelist Julian Barnes. From 1990 to 2002, Winterson had a relationship with BBC radio broadcaster and academic Peggy Reynolds, who left her marriage and lived with Winterson until 2002. Later, Winterson had an affair with theatre director Deborah Warner, which lasted six years. She was in a relationship with psychotherapist Susie Orbach, author of Fat is a Feminist Issue, for more than a decade. They married in 2015. They lived apart. The couple separated in 2019.

Aged 50, Winterson said that "I like the idea of people being fluid in their sexuality. I don't for instance consider myself to be a lesbian. I want to be beyond those descriptive constraints." Winterson has also said that other people seem so sure about her sexuality based on Oranges. She said that people see the main character as facing an issue to do with her sexuality, but she saw it as an issue with love. She said, at that time (2012), that she had had seven boyfriends.

In relation to her gender identity, Winterson has said that:

"I don’t really think of myself as female or male, I just think of myself as me. I’m not even sure I see myself as human. I don’t feel particularly human. My closest friends will say to you: ‘Yeah, maybe, she’s more like some sort of creature. Not an animal, but a creature thing.’ I don’t always get the human."

=== Other ===
Winterson has openly discussed having been suicidal (and attempted suicide in 2008) when her relationship with Deborah Warner ended, which coincided with her finding letters revealing previously unknown to her information about her adoption. She said poetry, writing and her friends (when she was able to talk) helped her find hope. She also has said she has heard voices during her life both in childhood and adulthood.

Winterson bought a derelict terraced house in Spitalfields, East London, which she refurbished into an occasional flat and a ground-floor shop, Verde's, to sell organic food. In January 2017, she discussed closing the shop when a spike in rateable value, and so business rates (which were set to rise from £21,500 to £54,000 in April 2017), threatened to make the business untenable.

In the 1990s, after publishing Written on the Body, Winterson bought a large house in Highgate. She sold it and moved to the countryside when she experienced a "mental collapse". She has another home in the Cotswolds, where she spends most of her time.

Since the age of twenty-six, Winterson was close friends with author Ruth Rendell until her death. She described her as having "been the Good Mother – never judging, quietly supporting, letting me talk, letting me be me.” She wrote her novel, The Passion, in her house.

== Bibliography ==
=== Novels ===
- Oranges Are Not the Only Fruit (1985)
- Boating for Beginners (1985)
- The Passion (1987)
- Sexing the Cherry (1989)
- Written on the Body (1992)
- Art & Lies: A Piece for Three Voices and a Bawd (1994)
- Gut Symmetries (1997)
- The Dreaming House (1998)
- The Powerbook (2000)
- Lighthousekeeping (2004)
- Weight (2005)
- The Stone Gods (2007)
- Ingenious (2009)
- The Daylight Gate (2012)
- The Gap of Time (2015)
- Courage Calls to Courage Everywhere (2018)
- Frankissstein: A Love Story (2019)

=== Memoir ===
- Why Be Happy When You Could Be Normal? (2011)

=== Short Stories ===
- The World and Other Places (1998)
- The Lion, The Unicorn and Me: The Donkey's Christmas Story (2009)
- Christmas Days: 12 Stories and 12 Feasts for 12 Days (2016)
- Eight Ghosts: The English Heritage Book of New Ghost Stories (2017)
- Night Side of the River: Ghost Stories (2023)

=== Children's Literature ===
- The King of Capri (2003)
- Tanglewreck (2006)
- The Battle of the Sun (Tanglewreck #2)(2009)

=== Non-fiction ===
- Fit for the Future: The Guide for Women Who Want to Live Well (1986)
- Art Objects: Essays in Ecstasy and Effrontery (1995)
- 12 Bytes: How We Got Here. Where We Might Go Next (2021)
- One Aladdin Two Lamps (2025)

=== Screenplays ===
- Oranges Are Not The Only Fruit (1990)
- Great Moments in Aviation (1995)

=== Editor ===
- Passion Fruit: Romantic Fiction with a Twist (1986)

=== Audiobooks ===
Read by the author:

- Why Be Happy When You Could Be Normal? (2012) – Audible Studios
- Oranges Are Not the Only Fruit (2015) – Audible Studios
- Christmas Days (2016) – Read with Imogen Church, Audible Studios
- Courage Calls to Courage Everywhere (2019) – Canongate Books
- 12 Bytes (2021) – Penguin Audio
- Night Side of the River (2023) – Read with Vicky Licorish, Penguin Audio
- One Aladdin Two Lamps (2025) – Read with Dana Haqjoo, Vintage Digital

Read by other:

- The Daylight Gate (2012) – Read by Sian Thomas, Penguin Audio
- Weight (2012) – Read by Dick Hill, Canongate Books
- The Gap of Time (2015) – Read by Ben Onwukwe, Mark Bazeley, Penelope Rawlins, Vintage Digital
- The Passion (2015) – Read by Daniel Pirrie, Tania Rodrigues, Audible Studios
- Sexing the Cherry (2015) – Read by Juliet Stevenson, Audible Studios
- Frankissstein (2019) – Read by John Sackville, Perdita Weeks and Harrison Knights, Vintage Digital

Winterson also recorded the afterward for The Living Mountain (2019) by Nan Shepherd, the preface to Nightwood (2017) by Djuna Barnes,
