= Oranges Are Not the Only Fruit =

1985 novel by Jeanette Winterson

- First edition
- Author: Jeanette Winterson
- Language: English
- Genre: Semi-autobiographical
- Publisher: Pandora Press
- Publication date: 21 March 1985
- Publication place: United Kingdom
- Media type: Print (Paperback)
- ISBN: 0-8021-3516-1
- OCLC: 15792328
- Followed by: Boating for Beginners

Oranges Are Not the Only Fruit is a novel by Jeanette Winterson published in 1985 by Pandora Press. It is a coming-of-age story about a lesbian who grows up in an English Pentecostal community. Key themes of the book include transition from youth to adulthood, complex family relationships, same-sex relationships, organised religion and the concept of faith.

It has been included on both GCSE and A-level reading lists for education in England and Wales, and was adapted by Winterson into a BAFTA-winning 1990 BBC television drama serial of the same name.

== Background ==
The book is semi-autobiographical and is based on Winterson's life growing up in Accrington, Lancashire. "I wrote about some of these things in Oranges, and when it was published, my mother sent me a furious note". A parallel non-fictional account of her life at this time is given in her 2011 memoir, Why Be Happy When You Could Be Normal?. Although the protagonist of Oranges bears the author's first name, John Mullan has argued that it is neither an autobiography nor a memoir, but a Künstlerroman.

== Plot ==
Jeanette is an only child, adopted as a baby. Her mother, who wanted to acquire a child in a sexless manner whom she could train to be a servant to God, is a devout evangelist member of the Elim Pentecostal Church; she was converted after meeting the charismatic Pastor Spratt, a missionary whom she idolises and whose crusades she frequently discusses. Jeanette's father is largely absent from the novel. Her childhood is full of rigorous prayer and preparation for her future as a missionary, which includes listening to the World Service Missionary Report with her mother every Sunday on the radiogram and recording the number of converts. Up until the age of seven she is homeschooled by her mother, mostly by learning to read the Bible.

As a child Jeanette lost her hearing for three months, but her condition was misdiagnosed as her mother and the congregation believed her to be in a state of rapture. After another church member, Miss Jewsbury, discovers her ailment, Jeanette is treated at the hospital. Following her operation, she spends a lot of time with Elsie, another church member, who teaches her about poetry and Wagner.

When Jeanette begins attending school after her mother is ordered to send her, she is something of an outcast to the other children. The teachers disapprove of her art projects which quote biblical scenes, especially a sampler of Jeremiah 8:20 she makes for Elsie, which they find unnecessarily morbid and disturbing. One teacher, Mrs. Vole, informs Jeanette that she is obsessed by God and that she has been scaring the other students with her stories of Hell. Mrs. Vole sends a letter about this issue to Jeanette's mother, who reacts with elation rather than anger. Eventually, Jeanette stops making projects that reference biblical themes, but finds that she still remains an outcast.

As she ages, Jeanette realises that she sometimes disagrees with the teachings of her congregation, particularly one sermon about the nature of perfection. She also starts thinking about romance, listening intently to other women's complaints and opinions about their husbands and forming a theory that all men are 'beasts'.

One day Jeanette and her mother go downtown and see a girl named Melanie working at a fish stall. They soon become friends, and Jeanette invites Melanie to her church, where Melanie agrees to be saved by Jesus Christ. After this, Jeanette frequently visits Melanie's house for Bible study. As the two spend more time together, they start having a love affair. Jeanette eventually tells her mother about how much she loves Melanie out of a desire to communicate her newfound happiness, and the following Sunday at church the pastor publicly confronts them about their fallen state. Melanie repents immediately, but Jeanette argues and flees. She takes refuge at the house of Miss Jewsbury, who is herself a lesbian, and they sleep together.

The following day the elders of the church attempt to exorcise the demons from Jeanette. When she still will not repent, her mother locks her in the parlour for thirty- six hours with no food. During this time, she hallucinates an orange demon, representative of her homosexuality, and following a conversation with it decides to keep it instead of driving it out, despite the difficulties it assures her she will face. After this, she pretends to repent, but maintains her impression that she has not done anything wrong by loving both Melanie and God.

Melanie disappears and Jeanette becomes deeply involved in the church again. Her role has grown and she now preaches her own sermons and teaches Sunday school. Soon Jeanette begins a new affair with Katy, a recent convert. When they are caught one weekend, Jeanette takes all the blame, saying that she had been with Melanie. The church decides that Jeanette has been given too much responsibility, and now almost thinks that she is a man. They insist that she give up teaching and preaching. Instead of obeying them, Jeanette leaves the church, and is subsequently forced to leave home by her mother.

At this moment in the narrative, the story splits off into a parallel tale of Winnet Stonejar, a parable symbolising the story of Jeanette's life. Winnet is a young girl who, while wandering through the forest, encounters a sorcerer who offers to adopt her in exchange for tremendous powers. After years in the sorcerer’s care, Winnet betrays him by falling in love, and the sorcerer tells Winnet she must either leave, or stay but be banished to a lifetime of caring for the village goats. A raven appears to Winnet and tells her that her life will be full of grief if she stays. While Winnet wonders what to do, the sorcerer - disguised as a mouse - sneaks into Winnet’s room and ties a thread around her coat button, which he can use at any time to tug her back to him.

With no home, friends, or money, Jeanette takes up various jobs, such as working in a funeral parlour and as an ice cream truck driver. On occasion, she runs into her mother or members of her congregation, who treat Jeanette coldly and say she is possessed by demons. One day she is driving her ice-cream truck through the town when she notices a crowd around Elsie's house. Upon enquiring, she is coldly informed that Elsie has died, and is taken aside by the pastor, who tells her that Melanie confessed she never loved Jeanette.

Eventually, she moves to the city to work in a mental hospital. After an unspecified time, Jeanette returns home one winter to see her mother, whose behaviour indicates that she has become more tolerant of Jeanette's lifestyle, though they do not discuss it. Her mother is still a devout believer, listening to the missionary reports on the radio system with her usual fervour, but her Society for the Lost has been shaken by corruption.

== Literary allusions in the novel ==
The novel is divided into eight sections, each of which is named after one of the first eight books of the Bible (Genesis, Exodus, Leviticus, Numbers, Deuteronomy, Joshua, Judges, and Ruth.) Each chapter often contains references and allusions to their corresponding book in the Bible.

The novel contains references to numerous literary works, historical figures and aspects of popular culture:

- The title is an imagined quotation of the Restoration courtesan Nell Gwyn (and is one of two epigraphs, the other being a cooking instruction for marmalade).
- Jeanette's mother frequently lauds the good and moral behaviour of the titular character in Jane Eyre, by Charlotte Brontë (though Jeanette later discovers that she altered the plot when reading it to her, so that the protagonist married St John Rivers instead of Mr Rochester).
- Jeanette compares her mother to William Blake.
- Jeanette's great-uncle is described as a stage-actor, who at least once performed as Hamlet to favourable reviews.
- The owner of the local pest-control shop, Mrs. Arkwright, shares the same name with the similarly miserly owner of the local grocery shop in Open All Hours, a popular BBC sitcom that originally ran from 1976 to 1985.
- Jeanette's mother is subscribed to the religious magazine The Plain Truth, which was issued monthly by The Worldwide Church of God from 1934 to 1986. In the novel the family receive a weekly subscription.
- Whilst visiting Jeanette in hospital, Elsie reads "Goblin Market" by Christina Rossetti, and poems by William Butler Yeats, including "Lapis Lazuli".
- Jeanette and her mother see The Ten Commandments, starring Charlton Heston, at the cinema.
- For her Easter-Egg painting competition entry, Jeanette paints her eggs as characters from Richard Wagner's opera cycle The Ring of the Nibelung, including the Germanic heroine Brunhilda.
- She also creates artworks based on the 1942 film Now, Voyager, and the Tennessee Williams play A Streetcar Named Desire.
- At her local library, Jeanette reads a version of the French fairy tale Beauty and the Beast.
- Jeannette's mother is shown to be a fan of country and gospel singer Johnny Cash.
- In her new oversized raincoat Jeannette is reminded of seeing The Man in the Iron Mask – which film version remains unspecified, however.
- Feelings of misery remind Jeanette of the poet John Keats.
- The short, abstract section entitled "Deuteronomy" alludes to the legend of Atlantis, the mythical city of El Dorado, Saint George and the Second World War.
- Later in the novel, a confused Jeanette dreams of a library where a number of young women are shown to be translating the epic Old English poem Beowulf.
- Toward the close of the novel, Jeanette is depicted on a train reading George Eliot's Middlemarch.

The novel is interspersed with short stories that bear many resemblances to (and draw influences from) traditional Biblical stories of the Old Testament, tales of Arthurian legend (specifically to Thomas Malory's Le Morte d'Arthur), especially the tale of Perceval on his quest for the holy Grail, and other popular fairy tales.

== Reception ==
The novel won Winterson the Whitbread Award for a First Novel in 1985.

Although it is sometimes referred to as a "lesbian novel," Winterson has objected to this label, arguing, "I've never understood why straight fiction is supposed to be for everyone, but anything with a gay character or that includes gay experience is only for queers."

== Adaptations ==
A television adaptation of the book was made and aired by the BBC in 1990, starring Charlotte Coleman and Geraldine McEwan, which won the Prix Italia in 1991.

The book was released on cassette by BBC Audiobooks in 1990, also read by Coleman.

A two-part dramatisation, adapted by Winterson and starring Lesley Sharp, was broadcast on BBC Radio 4 in April 2016.

On 2 June 2025, The Times revealed that a stage musical adaptation of the book is in development by the Royal Shakespeare Company. It will be directed by Josie Rourke and will feature music by Lucy Spraggan.

== Legacy ==
The novel has been included on both GCSE and A-level reading lists for education in England and Wales, including the OCR English Literature A-level module "Literature Post-1900".
