= Cluub Zarathustra =

Fringe comedy cabaret act and troupe

- Notable work: Cluub Zarathustra, Attention Scum!

Comedy career
- Years active: 1994–1997
- Medium: Theatre, television
- Genres: Cabaret, Sketch, Monologues

Cluub Zarathustra was a fringe comedy cabaret act and troupe active between 1994 and 1997. It began as a comedy club in Islington, London, twice went to the Edinburgh Festival Fringe and was eventually given a Channel 4 television pilot. It is also the subject of a 2012 book called You Are Nothing.

Cluub Zarathustra was set up by comedians Simon Munnery and Roger Mann. Its remit was to showcase unconventional and avant garde comedy, without the acts ever resorting to traditional comedy.

Stewart Lee soon joined and helped in the vision and organisation of the Cluub. Other members were Johnny Vegas, Julian Barratt, Loré Lixenberg, Richard Thomas, Richard Herring, The Iceman, Jason Freeman, Sally Phillips and the actor Kevin Eldon.

It directly led to the television series Attention Scum! and to the production of Jerry Springer - The Opera.

== Book ==
The Cluub is the subject of You Are Nothing, a history book written and researched by Robert Wringham and published in 2012 by Go Faster Stripe. It is suggested in the book that Cluub Zarathustra was the progenitor of much British comedy from the 1990s to the present day.
