= Loré Lixenberg =

British mezzo-soprano

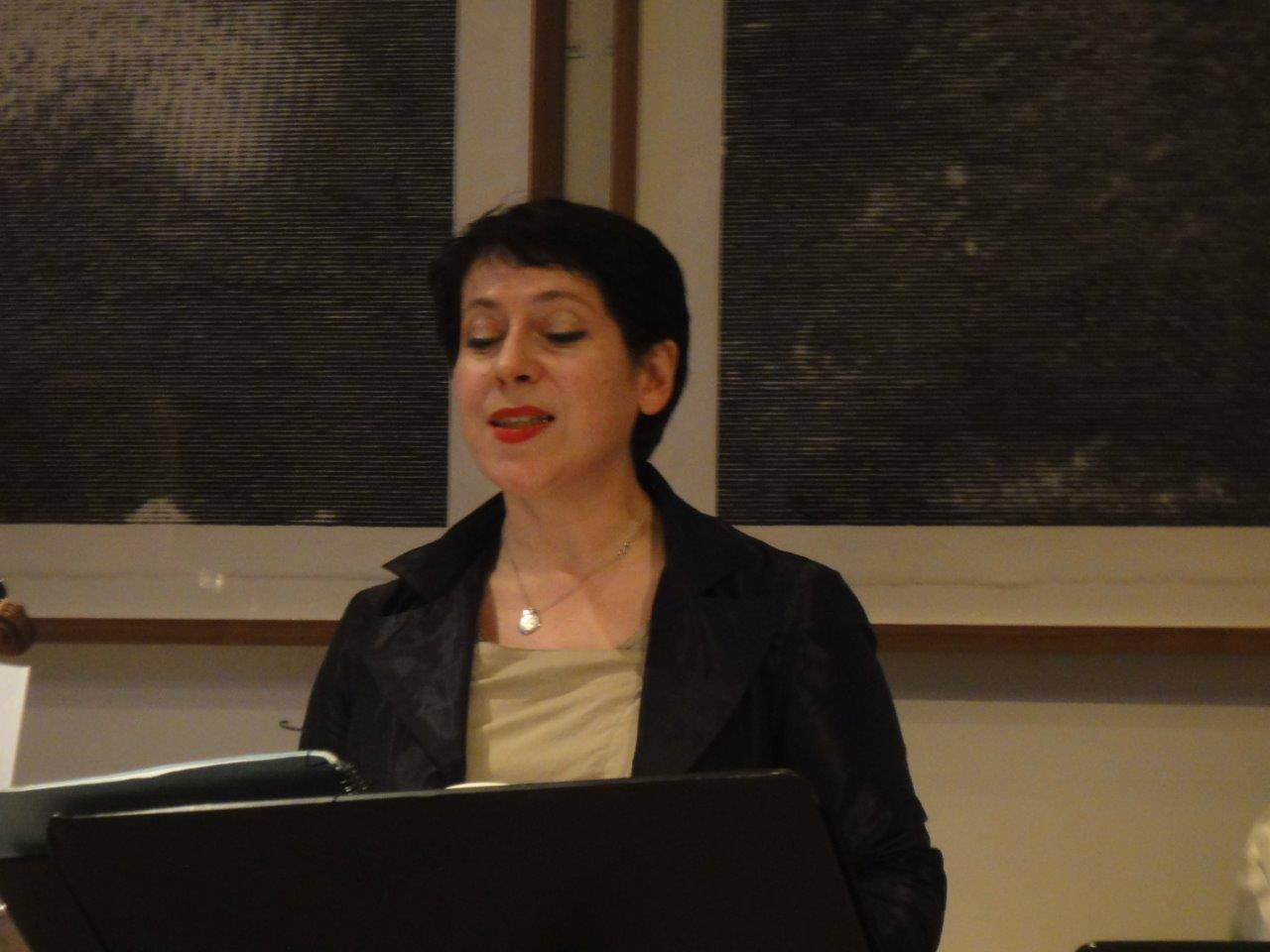
- Lixenberg in 2014
- Born: England
- Occupations: Mezzo-soprano; sound artist
- Years active: 1990s–present
- Style: Contemporary classical; experimental; opera
- Website: www.lorelixenberg.art

Loré Lixenberg is a British mezzo-soprano and sound artist, active in contemporary and experimental music. She received the John Cage Award in 2025.

== Career ==
Lixenberg studied composition with Andy Vores, Robert Saxton and John Woolrich and attended masterclasses with Peter Maxwell Davies. She studied voice with Nicole Tibbels, David Mason, Elisabeth Söderström, Galina Vishnevskaya and Martin Isepp. Her experiments in voice extend to physical artworks, direction, and voice and theatre compositions that encompass film, physical theatre, new technologies and the theatre of objects.

Lixenberg co-directs the experimental artspace La Plaque Tournante with composer Frédéric Acquaviva in Berlin. As a classically trained mezzo-soprano, she has worked and performed the music of Georges Aperghis, Helmut Oehring, Frédéric Acquaviva, György Ligeti, Phill Niblock, Pauline Oliveros, Earle Brown, Karlheinz Stockhausen, Harrison Birtwistle, Beat Furrer, Maurice Lemaître, Mark-Anthony Turnage, Jocelyn Pook, Peter Maxwell Davies, György Kurtág, Denis Dufour, Bernard Heidsieck and Trevor Wishart as well as interpreted the works of Luciano Berio, Isidore Isou, Nam June Paik, Gil J. Wolman, Luigi Nono, Salvatore Sciarrino, Conlon Nancarrow, Cathy Berberian and John Cage, whose "Aria" she was the first to perform in Bayreuth and also to record the complete Song Books for the CD label Sub Rosa in 2012.

Lixenberg gave over 1,000 performances all around the globe, from The Royal Opera, Covent Garden, to the most underground venues, and has performed with ensembles such as the Ensemble intercontemporain, Wien Modern, Birmingham Contemporary Music Group, BBC Symphony Orchestra, Berlin Philharmonic, and the Tokyo Philharmonic Orchestra.

She was active in the 1990s as a singer, actor, writer and comedian with Simon Munnery and Stewart Lee's Cluub Zarathustra and contributed to the BBC Two series Attention Scum. She created with composer Richard Thomas the BBC Two TV comedy-opera series Kombat Opera Presents. She appeared in and helped develop Richard Thomas and Stewart Lee's musical, Jerry Springer: The Opera at Battersea Arts Centre, Edinburgh Festival, National Theatre and the Cambridge Theatre on London's West End. Lixenberg appeared in Out of a House walked a Man at the National Theatre and Miss Donnithorne's Maggot with Complicité. Currently resident director with Danish ensemble Scenatet, she directed the UK premiere of Mauricio Kagel's Staatstheater.

Her book Memory Maps (preface by David Toop) is in the collection of artists books held at Bibliothèque Kandinsky / Centre Pompidou, Paris, as well as her sound artwork Bird / Transformation section. Her first artwork CD, The Afternoon of a phone, was published by £@B in 2014 and has been shown recently at Hamburger Bahnhof in Berlin.

== Politics ==
Lixenberg is leader of the Voice Party. In the 2019 United Kingdom general election she stood as an independent candidate in Hackney North and Stoke Newington, finishing last with 76 votes (0.1%).

== Voice works ==
- Prêt a chanter (2015) – a realtime opera
- Adipose – A Cautionary Tale (2013) – a live art opera
- Panic Room – The Singterviews (2012) – a realtime opera
- Bird (2010) – an avian opera
- Lethe (2008) – a grief opera
- The Little Christmas Tree (2006) – an installation opera
