= The Mind's Construction Quarterly =

UK-based magazine

- Pilot Issue of TMCQ
- Editor: Neil Scott
- Categories: Arts/Culture
- Frequency: Quarterly
- Founded: 2005
- Final issue: 2006
- Company: Noble Savage
- Country: United Kingdom
- Website: Official site

The Mind's Construction Quarterly was a UK-based magazine and webzine edited by Neil Scott and reporting upon the psychological dimensions of arts and culture. It had a postmodern slant but is classical in terms of its aesthetics.

With its roots in webzine format, a successful pilot issue of a paper version was launched in 2005 featuring a wealth of interviews, features and artworks around the theme of the human form.

The website explains:

we recognize that in art, literature, popular culture, science and philosophy there has been a turn towards the mind: from consciousness studies and evolutionary psychology to contemporary pop-philosophy and the media chatter about Celebrity Big Brother UK — all contribute to a wider interest in human psychology, an interest which TMCQ aims to cultivate and satisfy.

Past writers have included Neil Scott, Rhodri Marsden, Laura Gonzalez, Richard Herring and Robert Wringham. Interviewees have included Stewart Lee, Alex Kapranos, Simon Bookish, Pat Kane and Momus. The magazine folded in 2006.
