= Robert Wringham =

British writer (born 1982)

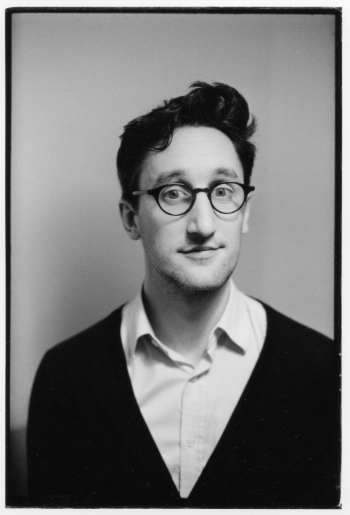
- Robert Wringham in 2015
- Born: 1982 (age 43–44); Dudley, West Midlands, England
- Citizenship: British citizen Resident of Canada
- Occupations: Author; comedian; magazine editor; film producer
- Spouse: Samara (m. 2014)
- Writing career
- Period: 2007–present
- Genre: Humor
- Notable works: New Escapologist (2007–); A Loose Egg (2014); Melt It! The Film of the Iceman (2026)
- Website: wringham.co.uk

Robert Wringham (born 28 November 1982) is a British humorist, best known as the editor of New Escapologist magazine and for his role in Melt It! The Film of the Iceman (2026). His first essay collection, A Loose Egg, was shortlisted for the Stephen Leacock Medal. He has also written two histories of alternative comedy and two comic novels.

== Early life ==
Wringham was born in England but moved to Scotland in 2004, where he worked as a librarian. His creative career began in stand-up comedy while posting short stories based on his material to Geocities and Livejournal.

== Work ==
Wringham is a humorist. In an article for the one-hundredth edition of Canadian Notes and Queries, he expressed a desire to be known as "the waster humorist." He also conveyed a belief in the social value of comic literature and an admiration for the work of Eric Nicol, Susan Juby, Paul Quarrington and Stuart McLean. He has cited Fran Lebowitz as an inspiration, saying "she's been so successful with so little work."

Wringham is the founder of New Escapologist, a lifestyle magazine. The magazine advocates the abolition of conventional employment. Some notable contributors have been Alain de Botton, Will Self, Richard Herring, Ewan Morrison, Tom Hodgkinson, Luke Rhinehart and Caitlin Doughty.

In 2012, Go Faster Stripe published Wringham's first non-fiction book You Are Nothing, which told the story of comedy troupe Cluub Zarathustra, whose members included Stewart Lee, Simon Munnery, Kevin Eldon, Julian Barratt, Graham Linehan, Sally Phillips and Johnny Vegas. The book is written from Wringham's outsider perspective and draws on conflicting interviews with cast and audience members.

2014 saw the publication of A Loose Egg, a collection of short pieces about Wringham's childhood, bachelorhood and early married life. In 2015, it was longlisted and finally shortlisted for the Leacock Medal.

In 2015, Wringham crowdfunded a New Escapologist book with publisher Unbound and the resulting Escape Everything! was released in 2016. A German edition called Ich Bin Raus was published the same year and attracted considerable media attention. A follow-up title was commissioned called The Good Life for Wage Slaves, published by Heyne Verlag in Germany and independently in the UK. When Unbound republished Escape Everything! as a paperback, it was retitled I'm Out: How to Make an Exit.

Returning to Go Faster Stripe in 2021, he wrote a second humour collection called Stern Plastic Owl. The following year, Go Faster Stripe published Wringham's second volume of comedy history with a book about the Iceman.

His first novel, Rub-A-Dub-Dub, was published in 2023. It won a Saltire Award for Best Cover Design. Wringham's second novel, Tether, was published first as an untitled yellow hardback in 2025, followed by a more conventional paperback in 2026.

In 2026, Wringham featured alongside Anthony Irvine in Melt It! The Film of the Iceman. He was also co-producer of the film. Wringham and the film's director, Mark Cartwright, took the film on a national tour, following each screening with a live Q&A.

Wringham writes for Joshua Glenn's pop culture website HiLobrow, and for the Idler magazine where he had a column between 2016 and 2020.

== Pseudonym ==
His pen name comes from James Hogg's Private Memoirs and Confessions of a Justified Sinner.

In The Good Life for Wage Slaves, Wringham explains that he'd been blogging under his original name since his early twenties but became self-conscious and in need of creative freedom when googling people became a common practice: "I didn't mind exposing my soul to a few strange nerds on the other side of the planet, but a certain dishonesty is required among friends, isn't it?"

== Personal life ==
While British, he is also a resident of Canada. In 2014 he married his long-term partner Samara, who appears as a foil in some of his writing.

== Bibliography ==
- You Are Nothing (2012) ISBN 978-0-9560901-2-6
- A Loose Egg (2014) ISBN 978-0-9939318-0-2
- Escape Everything! (2016) ISBN 978-1783521333

- I'm Out: How to Make an Exit (retitled paperback edition) (2021) ISBN 9781783529599
- Escape Everything! Tenth Anniversary Edition (2026) ISBN 978-1-910631-90-4

- The Good Life for Wage Slaves (2020) ISBN 978-1910631010
- Stern Plastic Owl (2021) ISBN 978-0-9560901-9-5
- Melt It! The Book of the Iceman (2022) ISBN 978-1-8384571-5-0
- Rub-A-Dub-Dub (2023) ISBN 978-1-910631-78-2
- Tether (2025/2026) ISBN 978-1-910631-89-8

== Filmography ==
Year	Title	Role	Notes
2026	Melt It! The Film of the Iceman	Himself, co-producer	Documentary
