= Melt It! The Film of the Iceman =

2026 documentary film

- Directed by: Mark Cartwright
- Written by: Robert Wringham
- Based on: Melt It! The Book of the Iceman by: Robert Wringham; Anthony Irvine
- Produced by: Mark Cartwright; Robert Wringham
- Starring: Anthony Irvine; Robert Wringham; Ronni Ancona; Jo Brand; Oliver Double; Robin Ince; Stewart Lee; Neil Mullarkey; Simon Munnery; Stuart Semple; Mark Thomas
- Edited by: Mark Cartwright
- Music by: Ben Holton
- Release date: February 7, 2026 (United Kingdom)
- Running time: 75 minutes
- Country: United Kingdom
- Language: English
- Budget: £5,000

Melt It! The Film of the Iceman is a 2026 British documentary film directed by Mark Cartwright and based on a 2023 book by Robert Wringham and Anthony Irvine. The film's executive producer is Michael Cumming.

== Premise ==
Using new interviews, archive footage and animation, the film follows Robert Wringham as he seeks information on the origins, motivations and legacy of The Iceman, a cult fringe comedian of the 1980s and 1990s whose act was to melt blocks of ice on stage.

As well as documenting the original comedy act, the film takes the Iceman to Clowns International's Clown Egg Registry, the British Stand-Up Comedy Archive at the University of Kent, and the Bill Murray Comedy Club in London for a final performance. More broadly, the film also explores the “speciality acts” and comedy scene of the Iceman’s day.

The film sees significant contributions from Ronni Ancona, Jo Brand, Oliver Double, Robin Ince, Stewart Lee, Neil Mullarkey, Simon Munnery, Stuart Semple, and Mark Thomas.

== Production history ==
The film is based on Melt It! The Book of the Iceman published by Go Faster Stripe in 2022. A small budget for the film was raised on Kickstarter.

== Release ==
After two early WIP screenings, the film premiered on February 8, 2026 at the Wolves Lit Fest followed by a 2026 national tour of arts cinemas and comedy clubs. Each tour screening was followed by a live Q&A with Cartwright and Wringham, often in conversation with a comedian or artist such as Phill Jupitus and Bilal Zafar

== Reception ==
The Skinny described Melt It! as a "fantastic documentary" while OutsideLeft called it "a fine portrait ... quirky and absurd, human and moving” and that it “captures a particular era of comedy performance perfectly, and allows for its participants to reminisce fondly, and very articulately, on the hidden depths of the absurd."
