= New Escapologist =

UK-based lifestyle publication

- Editor: Robert Wringham
- Frequency: Bi-annual
- Founded: 2007
- Country: United Kingdom
- Language: English
- Website: Official website
- ISSN: 1755-5671

New Escapologist is a UK-based lifestyle magazine. It originally ran between 2007 and 2017, returning to print in 2023 and now ongoing.

Humorous in tone, the magazine takes the stance that work should be escaped if not abolished. Each issue contains features, interviews, book and film reviews, "escape plans," and a roster of regular columnists. It has been described as "whimsical … niche, cheeky, defiant."

== History ==
New Escapologist was founded in 2007. Speaking at a public event together in 2009, the magazine's editor told Tom Hodgkinson that he started New Escapologist after reading Hodgkinson's book How to be Free alongside a biography of Houdini.

A pilot issue was printed in 2007, a first canonical issue in 2008, and a launch party was held at the Glasgow CCA in 2009.

In 2011, New Escapologist organized a zine fair in support of the student occupation of Heatherington House at the University of Glasgow. The same year saw the launch of a fifth issue at The Arches theatre and nightclub, and a sixth issue at the Edinburgh Festival Fringe.

In 2014, around the time of the magazine's tenth issue, a spin-off book written by Wringham was announced. Following a successful crowdfunding campaign, the book was published by Unbound on 28 January 2016 followed by a German edition published by Heyne Verlag later that same year.

In 2017, it was announced that the magazine would close after a decade but would continue online as a subscription essay series mediated by Patreon. The first of these essays went live in April 2017. A New Escapologist newsletter also began in December 2022.

New Escapologist returned to print in 2023 after a successful crowdfunding campaign.

== Production ==
For thirteen issues, the magazine's distinct typography, according to a colophon printed in the back of each issue, was achieved using Donald Knuth's TeX typesetting system with a layout based on an ancient Ge'ez liturgical text seen at the Matenadaran Manuscripts Museum in Armenia. Since Issue 14, the magazine has been produced using Scribus.

The magazine's logo, featured prominently in the masthead of early issues and at the magazine's website is the ISO standard "running man" symbol usually seen on exit signs.

More recent issues have dispensed with the logo, the minimalist covers featuring a pair of feet anchored in a different location. The masthead inside the magazine describes these photographs as "the view from [city name]".

== Notable contributors ==
- Alain de Botton, philosopher
- Ariel Anderssen, model
- Luke Rhinehart, author of The Dice Man
- Ewan Morrison, author of Tales from the Mall
- Richard Herring, comedian
- Tom Hodgkinson, author and editor of the Idler
- Dave Thompson, comedian and Teletubby
- Joshua Glenn, author of The Wage Slave's Glossary
- Judith Levine, journalist and NWU founder
- Ella Guru, artist and musician
- Ian Macpherson, comedian
- Dickon Edwards, musician and diarist
- Jacob Lund Fisker, blogger
- Aislínn Clarke, movie and theater director
- Landis Blair, illustrator and comic artist
- Seth, cartoonist and book designer
- Leo Babauta, blogger and author of Zen Habits
- Stanley Cohen, LSE Sociologist
- Mr. Money Mustache, financial blogger
- Lord Whimsy, designer and dandy
- Caitlin Doughty, author and mortician
- David Cain, blogger
- Steven Rainey, BBC Radio Ulster DJ
- Joseph Heath, University of Toronto philosopher and economics writer
- LD Beghtol, musician
- The Iceman, performer
