= Cheeke =

Cheeke is a surname. Notable people with the surname include:

- Alfred Cheeke (1810–1876), judge of the Supreme Court of New South Wales
- Stephen Cheeke (born 1967), British author and senior lecturer
