= Jacob Lund Fisker =

Danish astrophysicist (born 1975)

- Born: 1975 (age 50–51)
- Education: Aarhus University (cand.scient.); University of Basel (PhD)
- Occupations: Astrophysicist, author
- Known for: Extreme early retirement

Jacob Lund Fisker (born 1975) is a Danish astrophysicist and writer. He is known as the author of a philosophy of extreme early retirement that has inspired a lifestyle movement. Fisker's book Early Retirement Extreme discusses how to become financially independent with a median income. His philosophy has similarities to LeanFIRE within the FIRE movement. According to a New York Times article, he is "often thought of as the father of the FIRE movement."

== Life ==
Fisker holds a cand.scient. degree in physics and mathematics from Aarhus University, and a PhD in theoretical physics from the University of Basel in Switzerland. While at Aarhus, he received Statens Uddannelsesstøtte, a state education grant that provides Danish university students with a stipend to cover living expenses while enrolled. Even after completing his degrees, Fisker continued to live on a budget corresponding to the SU stipend he received as an undergraduate, although his income increased over time. As a postdoc, he saved 80% of his income and became financially independent in less than five years. He considered himself retired when he left his astrophysics career in 2009 at the age of 33, having accumulated a net worth 25 times his annual expenses of about $7,000. After becoming financially independent, he briefly came out of retirement to work as a quantitative analyst for three years, motivated by personal interest. Fisker is a permanent resident of the United States and lives in Chicago.

== Personal finance ==
As Fisker's income increased, the surplus was initially set aside in a savings account. Later it became clear to Fisker that the money could be invested in the stock market and generate a larger return. He realized that he would quickly and inevitably become financially independent due to the large difference between his income (which was a median income) and his expenses (which were extremely low). This led to the conclusion that relative wealth (income or wealth in relation to expenses) was more important than absolute wealth. Fisker started a blog called "Early Retirement Extreme" in 2007 to discuss his ideas, culminating in a book of the same name that was published in 2010. The book has sold over 45,000 copies as of 2020.

The book contains a mathematical study of savings rate and its impact on a person's ability to retire. With conventional personal finance advice, it is typically recommended to save 10–15% of income for retirement. With this savings rate, neglecting investment returns and compound interest, it takes between five and 10 years to save enough to cover one year's expenses. However, if 75% of income is saved, it is possible to cover three years' expenses for each year worked. The high savings rate allows for a much earlier retirement compared to the conventional savings rate.

In order to achieve low expenses, Fisker applies systems theory to personal finance. For example, instead of searching for the cheapest housing and the cheapest car, one may find an even cheaper solution with inexpensive housing within walking distance of work and a supermarket, eliminating the cost of a car as it is no longer needed for transportation.

== Philosophy ==
In further developing the Early Retirement Extreme concept, Fisker used the ERE acronym to capture a more refined philosophy that further de-couples personal resilience from financial concerns: he termed this Emergent Renaissance Ecology. This built on his ideas about the 'Renaissance Man' as introduced in the Early Retirement Extreme book, focusing on re-skilling and understanding emergent societal systems.

== Bibliography ==
- Lund Fisker, Jacob (2010). Early Retirement Extreme: A philosophical and practical guide to financial independence. Createspace. ISBN 978-1453601211.

=== Contributions ===
- The article "The Laws of Energy" in The Final Energy Crisis (2005) edited by Andrew McKillop, ISBN 978-0745320922.
- The article "Escape the Spend-Earn Cycle" in the magazine New Escapologist No. 5 (2011).
- Book chapter in Idler 44: Mind Your Business (2011) edited by Tom Hodgkinson, ISBN 978-0954845629.
- Book chapter in One Million in the Bank (2015) by Michael L. F. Slavin, ISBN 978-0996118606.

== External references ==
- Early Retirement Extreme
