= Simon Munnery =

British comedian

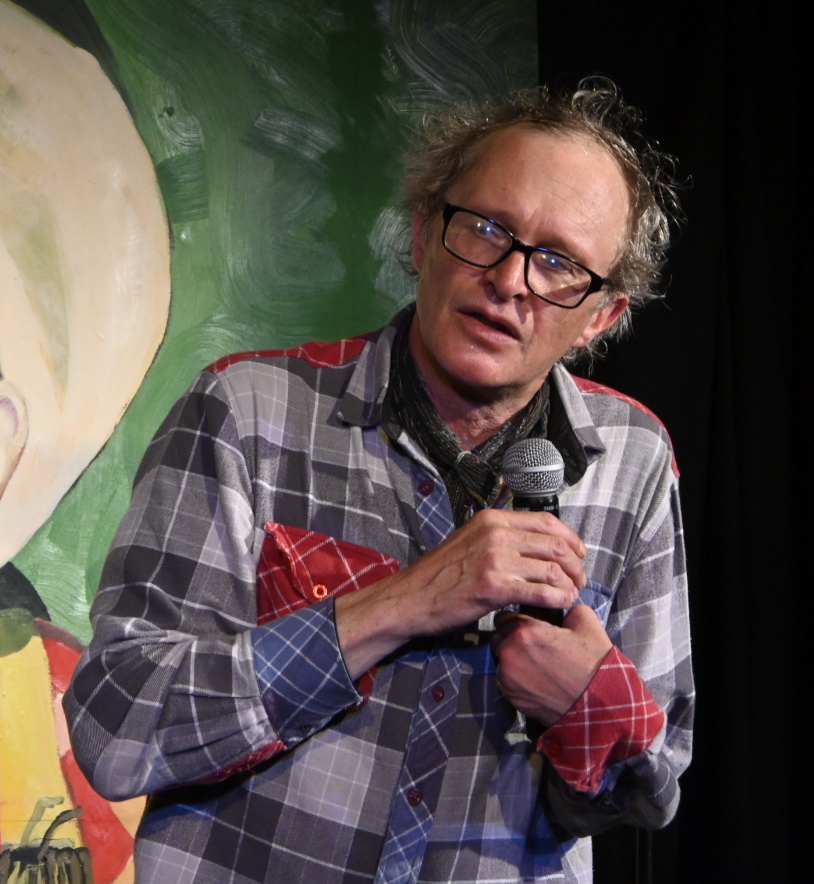
- Munnery performing at The Stand, Edinburgh, in 2022
- Born: 1967 (age 58–59); Middlesex, England

Comedy career
- Medium: Stand up, television, radio
- Genres: Alternative comedy, satire, surreal comedy
- Subject: Politics

Simon Munnery is an English comedian.

== Early life ==
Born in Middlesex, Munnery grew up in Bedmond and was educated at Watford Grammar School for Boys, where he earned four A Levels. He read natural sciences at Trinity College, Cambridge but soon lost interest in science and joined the Footlights. In 1987, he became vice-president with Peter Bradshaw as president. After graduating with "a very high third", he trained under Philippe Gaulier at École Philippe Gaulier. He did various menial jobs before making his big break into comedy, and has described praise of his work as implying his work occupies a place between "unfunny comedy" and "shit art".

Munnery had a short-lived career as a video game programmer. His most famous title was a version of Asteroids for the Commodore International VIC-20 (a game that Jeff Minter once described as a "pile of wank"). He also authored several games for the ZX81 (Road Race, Breakout and Space Invaders) and the ZX Spectrum. The VIC-20 games he wrote were Asteroids, Cosmiads and Scramble.

== Career ==
=== Stand-up comedy ===
While at university, Munnery took part in a stand-up double-act called God and Jesus with Stephen Cheeke. He also worked (along with Steve Coogan, Patrick Marber, Richard Herring and Stewart Lee) at the Edinburgh Festival in a piece called The Dum Show.

Munnery was brought to the attention of a comedy community as the compère of a post-alternative comedy cabaret called Cluub Zarathustra performed originally in London and later at the Edinburgh Festival. Cluub Zarathustra featured Stewart Lee, Kevin Eldon, Sally Phillips, Johnny Vegas, Julian Barratt, Richard Herring, Roger Mann, Jason Freeman and the music of Richard Thomas and Loré Lixenberg. A television pilot was made of Cluub Zarathustra for Channel 4 in 1996, but was never broadcast. It became the subject of a book by Robert Wringham in 2012.

Munnery's Edinburgh Fringe shows include Trilogy, Buckethead and Simon Munnery's Annual General Meeting.

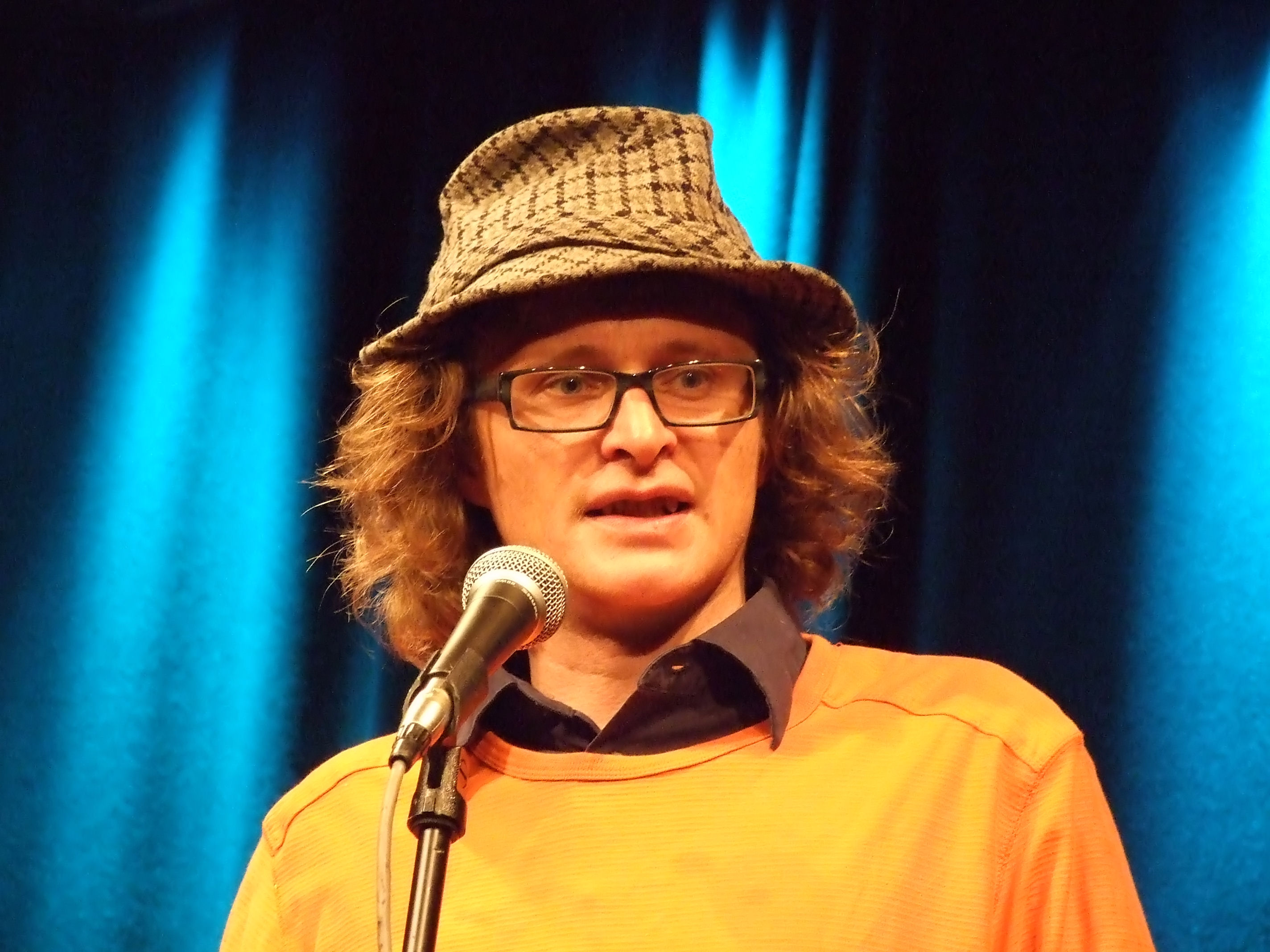
Munnery at Chapter Arts Centre in 2007

His reoccurring 2004-09 Edinburgh Fringe show, AGM, included the opportunity for the audience to raise questions to discuss as group (such as "is there a God?"). The experience would often continue after the main show, when he takes the audience on tours around town, taking in art galleries, drinks and visits to other shows.

In 2010, Munnery hosted a Bright Club event at the Bloomsbury Theatre.

=== Television ===
Futurtv ("Not 'Future TV', oh no. It can't be 'Future TV' – it's right now!") was a BBC production for UK Play from 1999. There were 13 15-minute episodes. As well as Simon Munnery, it included Kombat Opera Presents (Loré Lixenberg and Richard Thomas) and a selection of pop videos.

Munnery wrote and hosted the 1999 TV comedy game show, Either/Or.

Attention Scum! was a television series produced for the BBC and directed by Stewart Lee, which aired from February 2001. It starred Munnery as 'The League Against Tedium', a character who drove around the United Kingdom in an adapted transit van, preaching to the masses with the help of an opera singer (Loré Lixenberg), a sedated vampire (Richard Thomas), and a monkey (Munnery's wife Janet).

Munnery also appeared in sketches in the first series of Stewart Lee's Comedy Vehicle in 2009, and in Lee's The Alternative Comedy Experience for Comedy Central.

=== Radio ===
During the 1990s he made several series for BBC Radio 1, one based around his League Against Tedium character. Others were vehicles for his Alan Parker character, including Alan Parker, Alan Parker's 29 Minutes of Truth, and Alan Parker, Road Warrior for which he won the Sony Radio Award.

Munnery returned to radio in the early 2000s, hosting Simon Munnery's Experimental Half Hour ("experimental in that it lasts an hour") and Simon Munnery Weakly Chats on Resonance FM. He also wrote and performed two four-part Radio 4 series called Where Did It All Go Wrong?, which were broadcast in the summer of 2003 and the spring of 2005.

In 1999, together with John Hegley, he made a comedy series for BBC Radio 4 called The Adventures of John and Tony.

Munnery featured as a "genius" on Dave Gorman's Genius show on Radio 4.

== Books ==
- Sit-Down Comedy (contributor to anthology, ed Malcolm Hardee & John Fleming) Ebury Press/Random House, 2003. ISBN 0-09-188924-3; ISBN 978-0-09-188924-1
- How To Live, P.O.W, 2005. ISBN 0-9551946-2-8; ISBN 978-0-9551946-2-7 Republished by Go Faster Stripe, 2018
- Wall & Piece, (contributor), by Banksy, Century, 2006. ISBN 1-84413-787-2; ISBN 978-1-84413-787-9
- You Are Nothing, (interviewee), by Robert Wringham, Go Faster Stripe, 2012. ISBN 978-0-9560901-2-6

== Other works ==
Munnery has several CDs available: Alan Parker – Blast From The Past (featuring Stewart Lee on guitar and Al Murray on drums), Simon Munnery's Experimental Half Hour (2 CDs from the Resonance FM radio show of the same name), AGM recorded live at the Edinburgh Fringe Festival 2003, and BucketHead: Phenomenon Anon And On and Mr Bartlett & Mr Willis (2011) written and co-performed by Kevin Eldon.

In 2007 he appeared as Alan Parker on a music track by The Orb called "Grey Clouds", a take off of their earlier track Little Fluffy Clouds. It features on the Annie Nightingale album Y4K on Distinct'ive Records.

Two DVDs of his work were released in 2007 – the first IAMTV, covering his Perrier Award nominated show from the 1999 Edinburgh Fringe, was closely followed by Hello produced by Go Faster Stripe, a more recent stand-up performance.

In the 1990s, he regularly contributed a column to NME as "Alan Parker: Urban Warrior".

In 2009, Munnery starred in an award-winning animated rotoscope short, titled Yellow Belly End, co-written and directed by Philip Bacon, a student of the National Film and Television School. In the nine-minute film, Munnery appears in a bird costume and contemplates a cliff. He is credited as "Bird".

In 2017, Munnery was interviewed by fellow comedian Stuart Goldsmith for his podcast the Comedian's Comedian. They discussed the inspiration for some of Munnery's ground breaking characters amongst other topics.

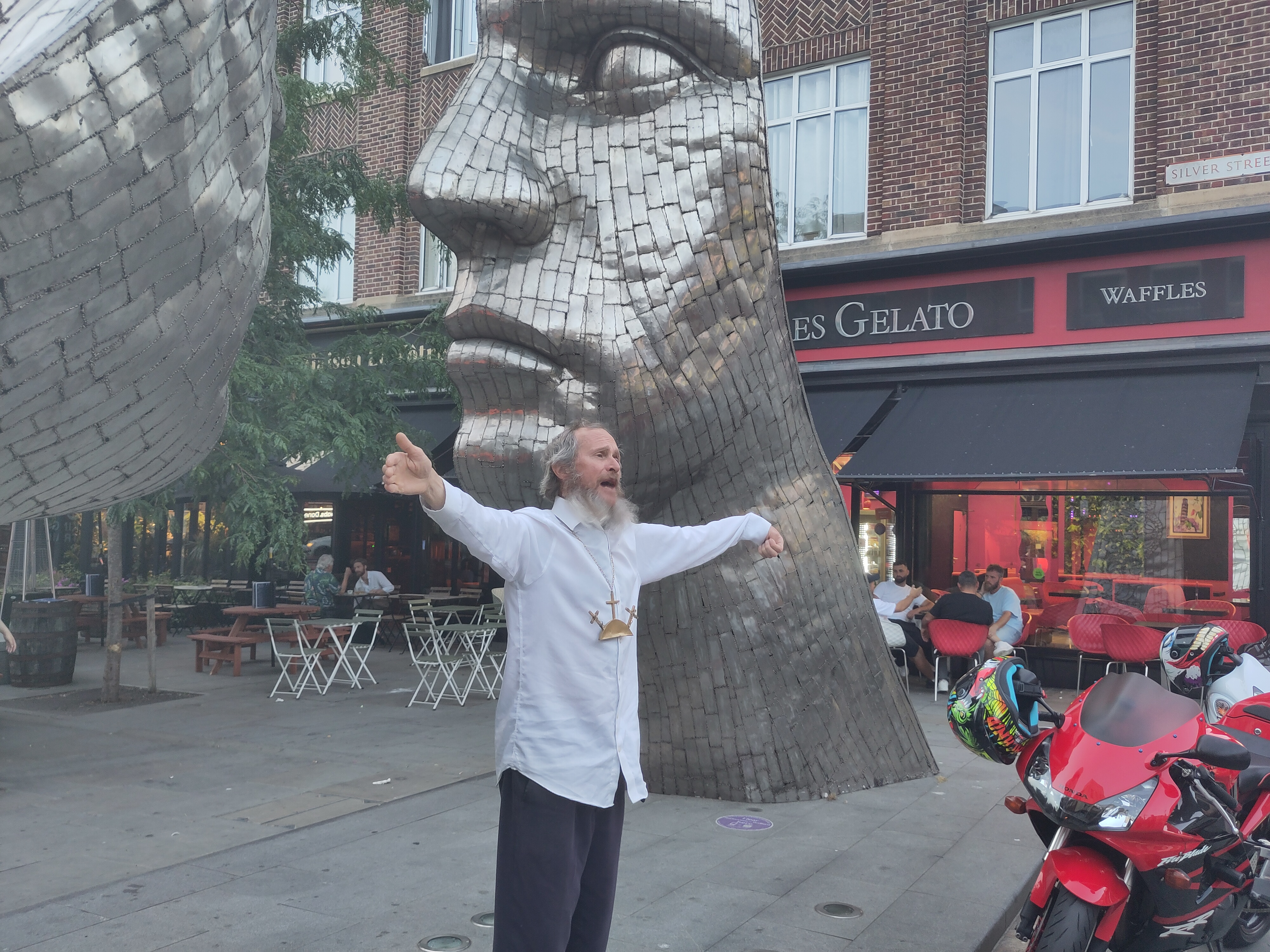
Munnery performing his play 'One Down' in Bedford Town Centre, England, 5 July 2026.

In 2020, artist Andy Holden curated a retrospective of the artwork of Munnery, titled 'What Am I?' It was first shown at Ex-Baldessarre, Bedford, and then toured to Stroud Valley Art Space.

In 2026 he appeared in Melt It! The Film of the Iceman.

Preceded by Ben Liston	Footlights Vice-President; 1987–1988	Succeeded by Tanya Seghatchian, Nick Wood
