= Kombat Opera Presents =

- Genre: Comedy; Opera
- Created by: Richard Thomas
- Written by: Richard Thomas; Stewart Lee
- Directed by: Dominic Brigstocke; Terry Jones; Peter Orton; Tim Kirkby
- Starring: John Thomson; Jon Culshaw; Kevin Eldon; Hugh Dennis
- Composer: Richard Thomas
- Country of origin: United Kingdom
- Original language: English
- No. of seasons: 1
- No. of episodes: 5

Production
- Executive producer: Jon Rolph
- Producer: Stephen Abrahams
- Running time: 30 Minutes

Original release
- Network: BBC Two
- Release: 25 February – 25 March 2007

Related
- Jerry Springer The Opera

Kombat Opera Presents is a British musical comedy television show. The comedy parodies British television programmes by transforming them into operas. The music for the series was written by Richard Thomas, with the series having its origins in the Kombat Opera segments of Simon Munnery's character The League Against Tedium, and his television show Attention Scum. The series won the Best Comedy prize at the 2008 Rose d'Or ceremony.

== Parodied shows ==
The following TV shows have been parodied:

=== Episode 1: The Applicants ===
- Originally broadcast on 25 February 2007
- A parody of The Apprentice

=== Episode 2: Spouse Change ===
- Originally broadcast on 4 March 2007
- A parody of Wife Swap

=== Episode 3: Question Time Out ===
- Originally broadcast on 11 March 2007
- A parody of Question Time

=== Episode 4: Manorama ===
- Originally broadcast on 18 March 2007
- A parody of Panorama

=== Episode 5: The South Bragg Show ===
- Originally broadcast on 25 March 2007
- A parody of The South Bank Show
