= Attention Scum =

Television series

- Created by: Simon Munnery; Stewart Lee
- Directed by: Stewart Lee
- Starring: Simon Munnery; Kevin Eldon; Richard Thomas; Lore Lixenberg; Johnny Vegas; Catherine Tate; Roger Mann; Janet Munnery; Bridget Nicholls
- Composer: Richard Thomas
- Country of origin: United Kingdom
- No. of episodes: 6

Production
- Executive producer: Myfanwy Moore
- Producer: Richard Webb
- Running time: 30 minutes

Original release
- Network: BBC Two
- Release: 25 February – 1 April 2001

Attention Scum was a 2001 television comedy series created by Simon Munnery and Stewart Lee. It starred Munnery as his "League Against Tedium" character and contained acerbic stand-up routines atop a transit van and sketches including mainstays such as "24 Hour News" (performed by Johnny Vegas), operatic intermissions by Kombat Opera, and two characters engaged in a duel over their hats.

== Broadcast ==
Originally shown on BBC 2 at 11:50pm on Sundays from February to April 2001, the programme was not repeated on the BBC and only played on the defunct channel UK Play. In March 2001, it was nominated for a Golden Rose of Montreux although the BBC had already declined to fund a second series. As of December 2025, there has not been an official home release.

== History ==
The origin of the series lies in a 1994 cabaret act, Cluub Zarathustra, co-founded by Munnery and Lee, and performed at the Edinburgh Festival. Cluub Zarathustra was nominated for a Perrier Award in 1999. A never transmitted (or commissioned) TV pilot of Cluub Zarathustra for Channel 4 was filmed in 1996.
