= The Adventures of John and Tony =

British radio programme

- Running time: 30 minutes
- Country of origin: United Kingdom
- Language: English
- Home station: BBC Radio 4
- Starring: John Hegley; Simon Munnery
- Original release: September 1999
- No. of series: 1
- No. of episodes: 4

The Adventures of John and Tony is a radio programme that aired in September 1999 on BBC Radio 4. There was one series of four thirty-minute episodes made. It starred John Hegley and Simon Munnery.

The series has two main characters, as the title suggests, with guest stars. It has been described as “surreal” and been compared to The Goon Show; plotwise, it follows two friends as they talk and travel; John reels off anecdotes and Tony delivers punchlines.
