= Alan Parker (radio show) =

British radio drama

Alan Parker is a short radio series broadcast in February–March 1995. There were six hour-long episodes that were broadcast on BBC Radio 1. It starred Simon Munnery as Alan Parker, an enthusiastic but comically naive left-wing character (not to be confused with the director of the same name).

It was followed the next year by a sequel, Alan Parker, Road Warrior, also of 6 one-hour episodes, aired in April–May 1996 on Radio 1. Munnery again starred in the title role.

The shows allowed Munnery to reprise his character "Alan Parker, Urban Warrior" who had previously included music clips in half-hour shows entitled 29 Minutes of Truth. The one-hour shows featured music tracks played in full. Critics found them weaker than the original shorter shows.
