= Rub-A-Dub-Dub (novel) =

2023 novel by Robert Wringham

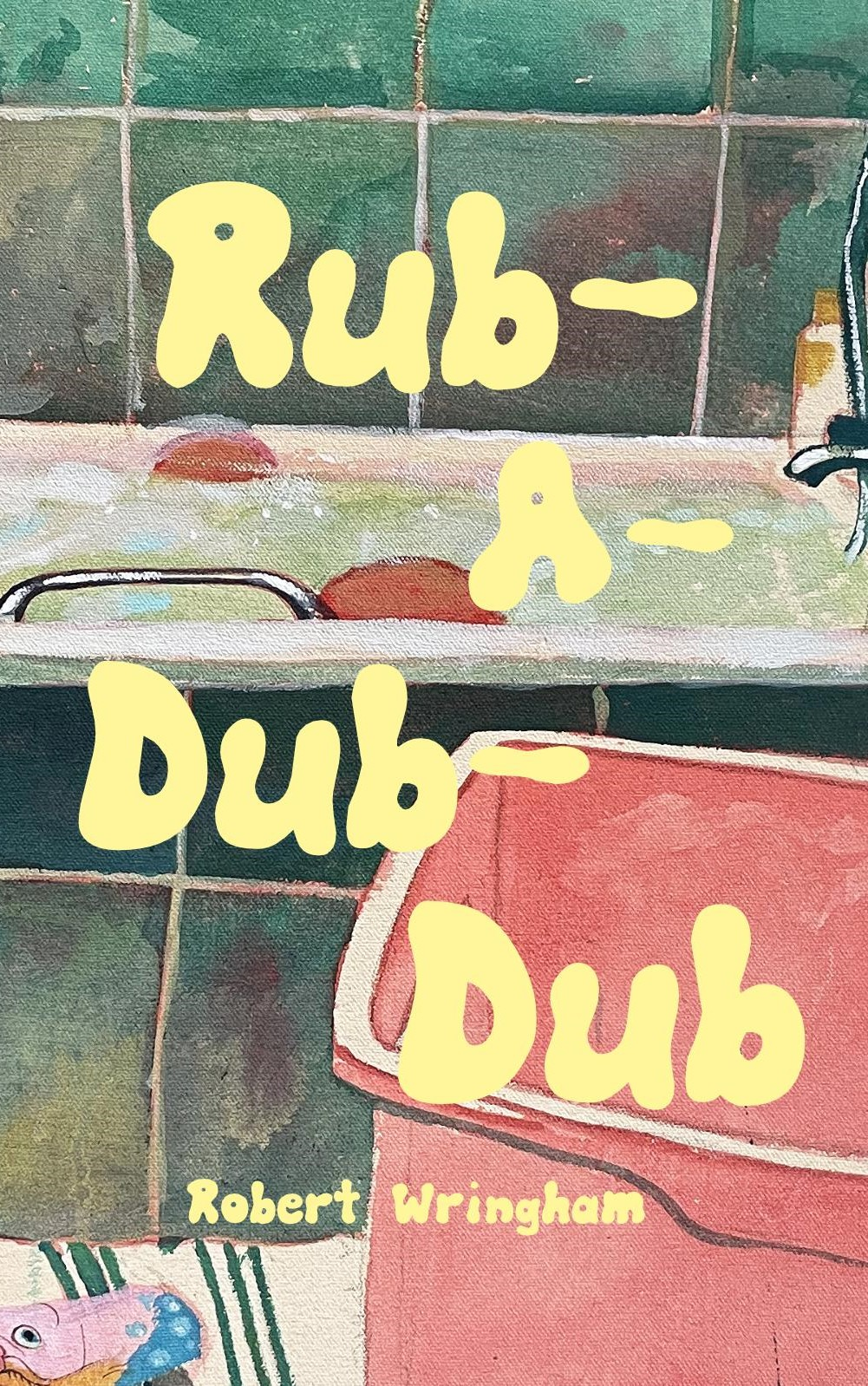
- First edition cover
- Author: Robert Wringham
- Cover artist: Thomas MacGregor
- Language: English
- Genre: Comic novel
- Publisher: P&H Books
- Publication date: 1 June 2023
- Publication place: Scotland
- Media type: Print (paperback)
- Pages: 264
- ISBN: 1-125-97948-8

Rub-A-Dub-Dub is a 2023 comic picaresque novel by Robert Wringham. The novel concerns a working-class, middleaged man who discovers self-care. It is set between October 2019 and January 2020 and takes place on a sleeper train and in a tenement flat in Portobello, Edinburgh.

== Summary ==
Mister Bob (real name Robert Forrester) works as a cleaner and trolley service operator for a privatized train company, often on an all-night sleeper service between Scotland and London. Landscapes and accents change as he rides up and down the UK. He accepts the reality of his job but finds it unpleasant, and the line between his unpaid commute and the job itself is indistinct. He has anxiety, alcoholism, obesity, hair loss and gingevitis. He also has nagging concerns about free will and makes gradual but noncommittal preparations for his suicide. He regularly experiences "Panic Visions": hallucinations that feel briefly real.

A colleague, Tracey, appears to be attracted to Mister Bob. Tracey is also an alcoholic but, unlike Mister Bob, is charismatic and displays an irreverent confidence. Together they skive, retreating to Mister Bob's sleeper cabin or to an empty First Class carriage to drink lager. In one such rendezvous, Tracey drunkenly suggests he might have more luck with women (i.e. herself) if he bathed more often and didn't smell.

Mister Bob throws himself into this assignment. He discovers luxury soap and other commercial goods pointing to more pleasant lives and more positive ways to think of himself. His soaks connect him nostalgically to childhood, promoting lengthy ruminations about himself, his personal history, and his place in the 21st century.

His life improves and his "Panic Visions" subside. He reads an article in a women's magazine left in the netting on the back of a passenger chair about "self-care" and comes to understand his metamorphosis but remains confused as to why such humanitarian guidance isn't also extended to people like himself.

When Mister Bob is presented with circumstances conducive to a drinking binge, he indulges willingly but is carried away when some younger men on a stag night include him in their drinking games. He reports to work the next day with a hangover and no uniform. In a confrontation with the train manager over professionalism, he is physically assaulted. The assault is witnessed by Tracey who, perhaps feeling sorry for him, meets Mister Bob for a sexual encounter during their night shift.

Humiliation and confusion begin a negative spiral in Mister Bob, threatening to undo the progress he has made. He experiences a long and intense Panic Vision in which he believes the International Space Station is falling from the sky. The Panic Vision, combined with a message of emotional rejection from Tracey, brings back his suicidal thoughts. His suicide attempt is left incomplete however, when he slips on the bath mat and bangs his head on the side of the bathtub. As he loses consciousness, he hears a disturbing radio news report about a global pandemic.

== Tropes and themes ==
In an interview, Wringham described using the tropes of grotesque body, scatological humour and blue humour. Some of his characters speak in regional accents, making use of eye dialect. He also suggests that the novel relates to working-class experience and might be aligned with the dirtbag left.

He has also said "I felt like I had permission to indulge a certain working-class sense of humour I grew up with that I don't usually have in my work."

== Topical references ==
The novel mentions the 2019 protests of Extinction Rebellion, the ISS tenure of Chris Hadfield, and UK politicians Caroline Lucas and Jacob Rees-Mogg. The Dunblane Massacre, the Lockerbie Bombing and the COVID-19 pandemic are also mentioned.

== Cover art ==
Rub-A-Dub-Dub won Best Book Cover at the 2023 Saltire Society Literary Awards.

The cover used an original commission from artist Thomas MacGregor. MacGregor based the composition on that of Jacques-Louis David's The Death of Marat.

== Reception ==
Pop Matters described it as a novel of transformation. OutsideLeft described it as "an extraordinary first novel, comic, poignant and dealing in detail with the endearing but sometimes revolting life of its protagonist." It was also recognised for its original cover art at the 2023 Saltire Literary Awards.

== See also ==
- Kipps
- The History of Mr Polly
- A Confederacy of Dunces
- Diary of a Nobody
- The Secret Life of Walter Mitty
