= The Alternative Comedy Experience =

- Created by: Colin Dench
- Directed by: Tim Kirkby
- Presented by: Stewart Lee
- Country of origin: United Kingdom
- Original language: English
- No. of series: 2
- No. of episodes: 25

Production
- Executive producers: Sarah Farrell; Stewart Lee
- Producer: Colin Dench
- Editor: Jon Blow

Original release
- Network: Comedy Central
- Release: 5 February 2013 – 8 October 2014

The Alternative Comedy Experience is a stand-up comedy show that premiered on 5 February 2013 on the Comedy Central channel in the UK. It features live comedy shows, filmed in July 2012 at The Stand Comedy Club in Edinburgh, and behind-the-scenes interviews.

Created and produced by Colin Dench and curated by Stewart Lee, The Alternative Comedy Experience sees performances from a variety of critically acclaimed stand-up comics, including Tony Law, David O'Doherty, Paul Foot, Simon Munnery, Josie Long, Henning Wehn, Stephen Carlin, Isy Suttie, Glenn Wool, Andy Zaltzman, Eleanor Tiernan, Bridget Christie, Boothby Graffoe, Maeve Higgins, Phil Nichol, Robin Ince and David Kay and Fern Brady. IMDB lists 38 comedians appearing across the 25 episodes.

Comedy Central confirmed on 29 May 2013 there would be a second series of the show, also to be filmed at The Stand Comedy Club. It was recorded in July 2013 and started broadcast in July 2014. Among the comedians joining the show in its second series are Kevin Eldon, Nish Kumar, Kevin McAleer and Michael Legge.

The show hasn't been recommissioned for a third series.
