= Johnny Vegas =

English actor, ceramicist and comedian (born 1970)

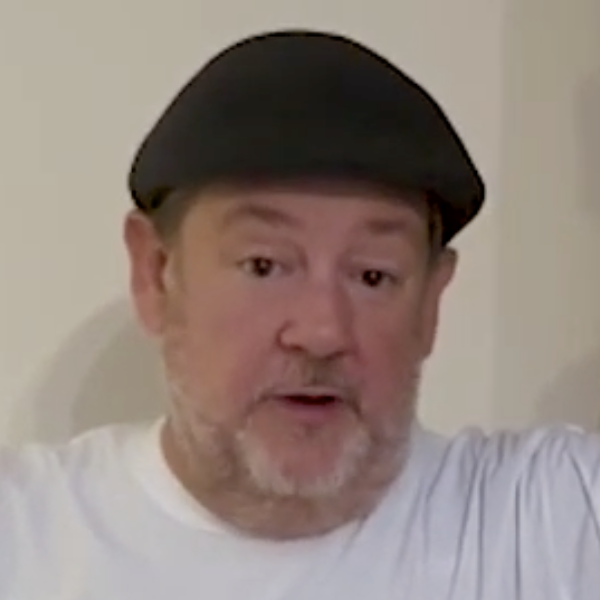
- Vegas in 2021
- Born: Michael Joseph Pennington; 5 September 1970 (age 56); St Helens, Lancashire, England
- Education: Middlesex University (BA)
- Occupations: Actor; comedian; director; writer
- Years active: 1996–present
- Spouses: Kitty Donnelly (m. 2002; div. 2008) Maïa Dunphy (m. 2011; sep. 2020)
- Children: 2
- Johnny Vegas' voice Recorded October 2010 from the BBC Radio 4 programme Desert Island Discs
- Website: johnnyvegas.co.uk

Michael Joseph Pennington (born 5 September 1970), known professionally as Johnny Vegas, is an English actor, comedian, artist and writer. He is known for his distinct Lancashire accent, husky voice, angry comedic rants and use of surreal humour.

Vegas' television roles have included Moz in the BBC Three dark comedy Ideal (2005–2011), Geoff Maltby ("The Oracle") in the ITV sitcom Benidorm (2007–2009, 2015–2017) and Eric Agnew in the BBC One sitcom Still Open All Hours (2013–2019). He has also been a regular guest panellist on the television comedy panel shows QI (2007–2019) and 8 Out of 10 Cats Does Countdown (2015–2019).

== Early life ==
Vegas was born Michael Joseph Pennington on 5 September 1970, in the Thatto Heath area of St Helens. He has an older sister and two older brothers; they were all brought up as Roman Catholic. At the age of 11, he attended the boarding school and seminary St Joseph's College in Up Holland to train for the priesthood, but came back homesick after four terms.

Vegas earned a BA in Art and Ceramics from Middlesex University in London. He then returned to his home town and took various odd jobs; he worked in an Argos warehouse, sold boiler insurance door-to-door, packed bottles of Cif in a factory, and was a barman at a local pub. Between 1994 and 1997, he was a member of Cluub Zarathustra, a comedy performance group led by Stewart Lee, Roger Mann, and Simon Munnery.

== Career ==
=== Television and radio ===
In 1996, Vegas made his television debut as a contestant on Win, Lose or Draw in the UK under his real name; however, he also made references to the fact he wanted to be a comedian and that his stage name was "Johnny Vegas". He featured on The Big Breakfast during the programme's final months before it ended in March 2002. His appearance was briefly shown during Channel 4's 100 Greatest Stand-Ups and BBC Three's Almost Famous 2. Vegas gained a wider audience as a regular member of Shooting Stars. His character was a pitiable sort always nursing a pint of Guinness. In 2001 he appeared on the Weakest Link, in a comedians special and beat Barry Cryer to win the jackpot of £10,200.

In 2002, Vegas starred in the BBC Radio 4 sitcom Night Class, which he co-wrote with Tony Burgess and Tony Pitts, with Dirk Maggs as director. Vegas played a former Butlin's redcoat teaching evening classes in pottery. It was a runner-up for best comedy at the Sony Radio Academy Awards.

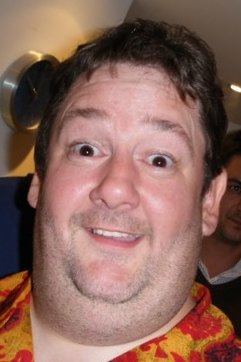
Vegas in 2007

He starred in the BBC Three sitcom Ideal as Moz from 2005 to 2011.

In 2005 he played Krook in the BBC adaptation of Dickens' Bleak House.

Between 2007 and 2009, Vegas played Geoff Maltby, aka "The Oracle", in the ITV sitcom Benidorm and from 2015 to 2017.

In a show performed in 2008, Vegas invited an audience member on stage, proceeding to touch her and fiddle with her skirt in a manner which a journalist with The Guardian saw as inappropriate. After Vegas complained about an ensuing article, the newspaper added a footnote stating that his solicitors had contacted the audience member, who told them she had participated willingly.

In 2012, Vegas played the role of Mr. Croombe in the television film adaptation of David Walliams's children's book Mr Stink.

In 2014, Vegas voiced Fat Baz in the ITV4 animated sitcom Warren United.

In August 2014, Vegas took part in ITV's two-part documentary series Secrets from the Clink. In May 2013, Vegas played the role of Lord Ratspeaker in a BBC radio adaptation of Neil Gaiman's Neverwhere, adapted by Dirk Maggs.

From 2013 to 2019, Vegas has played Wet Eric Agnew in the revived BBC sitcom Still Open All Hours. Vegas has guest presented numerous episodes of Sunday Brunch for Channel 4.

In August 2015, he narrated the four-part series Travel Guides for ITV. In 2016, he took part in ITV's celebrity driving show Drive, hosted by Vernon Kay.

In August 2016, Vegas starred in a one-off comedy pilot called Home From Home, playing the lead role of Neil Hackett. Filmed at Skiddaw View Holiday Park, the episode aired on BBC Two on 30 August 2016. In December 2016 it was announced that Home From Home had been commissioned for a full series to air on BBC One in 2018.

In 2017, Vegas starred opposite Sian Gibson in Gold's murder mystery-comedy film Murder on the Blackpool Express, reuniting for Death on the Tyne and Dial M for Middlesbrough. Since 2021, they have reprised their roles in the series Murder They Hope.

Beginning in September 2019, Vegas has starred as the voice of the title character in the surreal children's animated series The Rubbish World of Dave Spud.

He is a regular panellist on the quiz show QI, having appeared in 12 episodes as of 2019.

He has appeared as a guest panellist and team captain on Channel 4's 8 Out of 10 Cats Does Countdown, appearing in 11 episodes. Channel 4 featured his September 2017 poem about a drunk patron on its YouTube channel.

In 2023 it was announced that Vegas would be the director for a new audio series of The Wombles for BBC Radio 4, with Richard E. Grant as voice actor.

=== Film ===
In 2003, Vegas played Jackie Symes in the film The Virgin of Liverpool, Alf Prince in the film Cheeky and Trevor in the film Blackball. In 2004, he played Dave in the film Sex Lives of the Potato Men and voiced Uncle Stewart in the film Terkel in Trouble. In 2013, Vegas was the voice of Abu the hamster in the British film The Harry Hill Movie.

Vegas provided the voice for Asbo in the 2018 Aardman Animations film Early Man.

=== Other projects ===
Vegas appeared in Joe Orton's The Erpingham Camp at the 2000 Edinburgh Festival. In 2001, Vegas starred as Al in adverts for ITV Digital with a puppet named Monkey (voiced by Ben Miller). In 2007, he reprised the role in adverts for PG Tips tea.

Having achieved fame in entertainment, Vegas received plaudits for his ceramic work. Ceramic Review praised him, leading to a role in Pot Shots (collaborating with Roger Law), a film made for an international gathering of potters. This led to his work being acquired for a collection at the Victoria and Albert Museum and a commission from Old Spice to design a bottle for their aftershave.

In 2014, he directed a music video for Paul Heaton and Jacqui Abbott. That year he also published his autobiography.

In May 2017, it was announced Vegas would be starring in new comedy feature Eaten by Lions opposite Antonio Aakeel and Jack Carroll, directed by Jason Wingard.

== Personal life ==
In August 2002, Vegas married Catherine "Kitty" Donnelly. In a satire of celebrities selling exclusive pictures of their weddings to publications for high prices, he sold pictures of the ceremony to the adult comic Viz for £1. They separated in late 2006 and divorced in 2008. They had one child together.

In April 2011, he married Irish television presenter Maïa Dunphy in Seville. In January 2015, they announced that they were expecting their first child together. They separated in late 2017, reconciled in November 2018, and separated again some time before April 2020.

Vegas continues to live in his home town of St Helens, and has been outspoken about the pride he takes in it; he is well known for being active in supporting the local community. He fulfilled a lifetime ambition by appearing for St Helens RFC in Keiron Cunningham's testimonial rugby league game, a friendly against Hull FC, in 2005.

In December 2012, Vegas said that he had recently returned to the Roman Catholic faith in which his parents brought him up and credited the faith for his good upbringing.

In July 2014, Vegas was made an Honorary Doctor of Literature (HonDLitt) by Edge Hill University.

Vegas has spoken about his appreciation for the NHS.

Vegas has ADHD, for which he received a diagnosis at the age of 52.

== Filmography ==
=== Film ===
Year	Title	Role	Notes
2003	The Virgin of Liverpool	Jackie Symes	
2003	Johnny Vegas: Who's Ready for Ice Cream?	Himself	
2003	Cheeky	Alf Price	
2003	Blackball	Trevor	
2004	Sex Lives of the Potato Men	Dave	
2004	Reuben Don't Take Your Love to Town	Café owner	Short
2004	Terkel in Trouble	Uncle Stewart (voice)	English version
2004	The Libertine	Sackville	
2005	Blake's Junction 7	Blake	Short
2010	The Green	Dad	Short
2013	Blood and Nuts	Gordon Bennett	Short
2013	The Harry Hill Movie	Abu (voice)	
2015	Dark_Net	Alan	Short
2016	Grimsby	Milky Pimms	U.S. title: The Brothers Grimsby
2016	Womble Movie	Giro	
2017	Tulip Fever	Apothecary	
2018	Early Man	Asbo (voice)	
2018	Eaten by Lions	Ray	
2019	Tales from the Lodge	Russell	
2021	Paul Dood's Deadly Lunchbreak	Rexsan	
2021	The Drowning of Arthur Braxton	Arthur Braxton Sr.	
2024	Time Travel Is Dangerous	Robert	
2025	The Twits	Mr. Twit (voice)	

=== Television ===
Year	Title	Role	Notes	Channel
1996	Win, Lose or Draw	Himself	Contestant (1 episode)	ITV
2001	Attention Scum!	24-hour news man	6 episodes	BBC Two
2001	The Weakest Link	Himself	Comedians special	BBC Two
2000–2013	Never Mind the Buzzcocks	Himself	Guest / Team captain / Host (5 episodes)	BBC Two
2001–2003	Happiness	Charlie Doyle	12 episodes	BBC Two
2002	Shooting Stars	Himself	Regular panellist (19 episodes)	BBC Choice
2002	Room 101	Himself	Guest (1 episode)	BBC2
2002	Black Books	Fran's landlord	Episode: "Fever"	Channel 4
2002	Staying Up	Frank O'Hanlon	TV film	BBC Choice
2002	Tipping the Velvet	Gully Sutherland	TV mini-series (1 episode)	BBC Two
2003	Ed Stone Is Dead	Waiter	Episode: "All You Can Eat"	BBC Choice
2003	Top Gear	Himself	Guest (series 3, episode 8)	BBC Two
2005	Dead Man Weds	Lewis Donat	6 episodes	ITV
2005	18 Stone of Idiot	Himself	Host (6 episodes)	Channel 4
2005	Bleak House	Krook	TV mini-series (6 episodes)	BBC One
2005	ShakespeaRe-Told	Nick Bottom	TV mini-series (episode: "A Midsummer Night's Dream")	BBC One
2005–2011	Ideal	Moz / Roger	Regular role (54 episodes)	BBC Three
2005–2019	8 Out of 10 Cats	Himself	Regular panellist (13 episodes)	Channel 4
2007–2009, 2015–2017	Benidorm	Geoff Maltby aka "The Oracle"	Regular role (34 episodes)	ITV
2007–2019	QI	Himself	Regular panellist (12 episodes)	BBC Four / BBC Two / BBC One
2008	Alan Carr's Celebrity Ding Dong	Himself	Contestant / Team leader (1 episode)	Channel 4
2008	Massive	Tony	6 episodes	BBC Three
2009–2018	The Graham Norton Show	Himself	Guest (3 episodes)	BBC One
2010	Checkov Comedy Shorts	Tolkachov	Episode: "A Reluctant Tragic Hero"	Sky Arts 2
2010	Dave's One Night Stand	Himself	Headline act (1 episode)	Dave
2011	Show Me the Funny	Himself	Guest judge	ITV
2011	The Bleak Old Shop of Stuff	The Artful Codger	Episode: "Christmas Special"	BBC Two
2011	Little Crackers	Kevin	Episode: "Johnny Vegas's Little Cracker: I Was a Teenage Santa!"	Sky One
2011–2020	Celebrity Juice	Himself	Regular panellist (30 episodes)	ITV2
2012	The Matt Lucas Awards	Himself	Guest (1 episode)	BBC One
2012	Rude Tube	Computer	2 episodes: "Utter Fails" & "Animal Anarchy"	Channel 4 / E4
2012	The Cow That Almost Missed Christmas	Brian (voice)	TV film	CBeebies
2012	Mr Stink	Dad (Mr. Croombe)	TV film	BBC One
2012–2014	A League of Their Own	Himself	Guest panellist (2 episodes)	Sky One
2012–2015	Moone Boy	Crunchie Haystacks	6 episodes	Sky One
2013	Common Ground	Rupert	Episode: "Rupert"	Sky Atlantic
2013	It's Kevin	Billy Pike	1 episode	BBC Two
2013	Moving On	Drive-through burger server / Taxi controller (voices)	Uncredited (2 episodes: "That's Amore" & "Back by Six")	BBC One
2013	The Jonathan Ross Show	Himself	Guest (1 episode)	ITV
2013–2014	Have I Got News for You	Himself	Guest (2 episodes)	BBC One
2013–2018	Sunday Brunch	Himself	Guest / Presenter (7 episodes)	Channel 4
2013–2019	Still Open All Hours	Wet Eric Agnew	Regular role (40 episodes)	BBC One
2014	Warren United	Fat Baz (voice)	6 episodes	ITV4
2014	All Star Mr & Mrs	Himself	Contestant (with wife Maia Dunphy; 1 episode)	ITV
2014	Secrets from the Clink	Himself	Participant	ITV
2014	Crackanory	Himself	Host / Presenter (1 episode: "Self Storage & the Obituary Writer")	Dave
2014	Psychobitches	Salome	TV mini-series (1 episode)	Sky Arts
2014–2015	Celebrity Fifteen to One	Himself	Guest (2 episodes)	Channel 4
2014–2016	Duck Quacks Don't Echo	Himself	Panellist (3 episodes)	Sky One
2015	Travel Guides	Himself	Narrator (4 episodes)	ITV
2015	House of Fools	Bradford butcher	Episode: "The Botox Affair"	BBC Two
2015	Brilliantman!	Mrs. Wardale	TV short	Sky Arts
2015	The Jonathan Ross Show	Himself	Guest (1 episode)	ITV
2015–2016	Drunk History	Vicar Andrew / Baby Jesus	2 episodes	Comedy Central
2015–2016	Alan Davies: As Yet Untitled	Himself	Guest (2 episodes)	Dave
2015–2019	Through the Keyhole	Himself	Celebrity panellist (3 episodes)	ITV
2015–2019	8 Out of 10 Cats Does Countdown	Himself	Contestant / Team captain (12 episodes)	Channel 4
2015–2019	The Last Leg	Himself	Guest (12 episodes)	Channel 4
2016	The Comedy Strip Presents... Red Top	Johnny	TV film	Gold
2016	Neil Gaiman's Likely Stories	Daniel	TV mini-series (episode: "Closing Time")	Sky Arts
2016	Lip Sync Battle UK	Himself	Contestant (episode: "Jonny Vegas vs. Vic Reeves")	Channel 5
2016	Drive	Himself	Contestant; finished in fourth place	ITV
2016	Travel Man	Himself	Guest (episode: "48 Hours in Dubai")	Channel 4
2016	Celebrity Storage Hunters	Himself	Main buyer (episode: "Banbury")	Dave
2016	Tipping Point: Lucky Stars	Himself	Contestant (1 episode)	ITV
2016	Alan Carr's 12 Stars of Christmas	Himself	Guest	Channel 4
2016–2017	The Funny Thing About...	Himself	Presenter (6 episodes)	Channel 5
2016–2018	Home from Home	Neil Hackett	Regular role (7 episodes)	BBC Two (pilot) / BBC One (series)
2017	The 2,000,000 Calorie Buffet	Himself	Narrator, TV film documentary	Channel 4
2017	The Great Pottery Throw Down	Himself	1 episode	BBC Two
2017	Red Dwarf	Crit Cop	Episode: "Timewave"	Dave
2017	Murder on the Blackpool Express	Terry	TV film	Gold
2018	Death on the Tyne	Terry	TV film	Gold
2018	The Queen and I	Spiggy	TV film	Sky One
2019	Celebrity Catchphrase	Himself	Contestant (1 episode)	ITV
2019	The Big Narstie Show	Himself	Season 2 Episode 4	Channel 4
2019	All Round to Mrs. Brown's	Himself	Guest (1 episode)	BBC One
2019	Good Omens	Ron Ormorod	TV mini-series (episode: "The Doomsday Option")	Amazon Prime Video
2019	Dial M for Middlesbrough	Terry	TV film	Gold
2019	The Rubbish World of Dave Spud	Dave Spud	Voice role (78 episodes +1 movie)	CITV
2020–2022	Meet the Richardsons	Himself	Regular role	Dave
2020–2022	Celebrity Gogglebox	Himself		Channel 4
2020–2022	Taskmaster	Himself	Series 10; 10 episodes; Contestant	Channel 4
2021	James Martin's Saturday Morning	Himself / Guest	1 episode	ITV
2021	Sunday Brunch	Himself / Guest	1 episode; 9 May 2021	Channel 4
2021	Martin & Roman's Weekend Best!	Himself / Guest	1 episode; 16 May 2021	ITV
2021	Cooking with the Stars	Himself / Contestant	Series 1; Semi-finalist	ITV
2021	Paul O'Grady's Saturday Night Line Up	Himself / Contestant	1 episode; 18 September 2021	ITV
2021	Mandy	The Ghost of Christmas Past	Christmas special "We Wish You A Mandy Christmas"	BBC
2021	The Greatest Snowman	Himself	Contestant	Channel 4
2021–2022	Murder, They Hope	Terry Bremmer	TV mini-series	Gold
2021, 2024	Johnny Vegas: Carry on Glamping	Host / Presenter	TV mini-series	Channel 4
2022	Pointless Celebrities	Himself	Contestant	BBC One
2022	Big Zuu's Big Eats	Himself / Guest	1 episode; 4 July 2022	Dave
2023	Romantic Getaway	Alfie	6-part series	Sky Max
2023	DNA Journey	Himself	With Alex Brooker	ITV
2023	Blood Actually: A 'Murder, They Hope' Mystery	Terry Bremmer	Christmas comedy special	Gold
2024	Apocalypse Slough: A Murder, They Hope Mystery	Terry Bremmer	Comedy special	Gold
2024	Generation Z	Jason	3 episodes	Channel 4
2024	World's Most Dangerous Roads	Himself	One episode alongside Lucy Beaumont	U&Dave
2025–present	Johnny Vegas's Little Shop of Antiques	Himself	Antiques show	Quest
2025	Johnny Vegas: Art, ADHD and Me	Himself	Two-part documentary	Channel 4

=== Radio ===
Year	Title	Role
2008	The Ragged Trousered Philanthropists	Easton
2010	Chequebook & Pen	Les Dawson
2012	Diary of a Nobody	Charles Pooter
2013	Neverwhere	Lord Ratspeaker

== Stage ==
Year	Title	Role	Notes
2026	Road	Scullery	Royal Exchange Theatre, Manchester
