= The Iceman (performer) =

British performance artist and visual artist

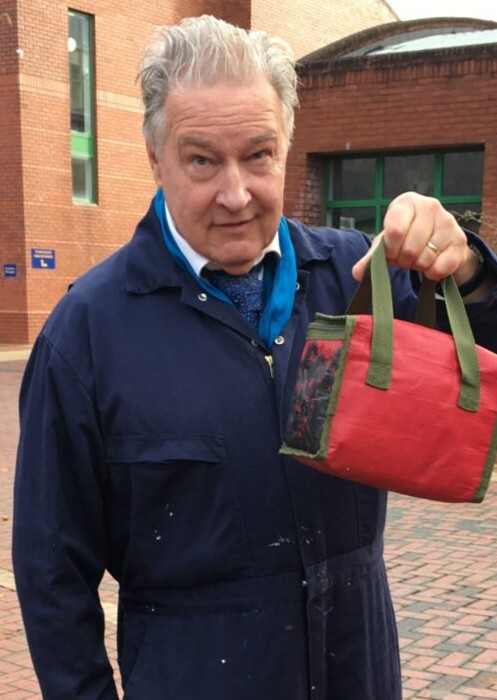
- Anthony Irvine in 2024
- Born: 17 February 1951 (age 75)
- Education: Oriel College, Oxford University, Royal Welsh College of Music & Drama
- Notable work: The Iceman, Funny Bones, aim

Comedy career
- Years active: 1977–present
- Medium: Alternative comedy, performance art, fine art, outsider art
- Website: iceblocked.co.uk

Anthony Irvine (born 17 February 1951), also known as the Iceman and aim, is a British performance artist and visual artist.

== Performance ==
As the Iceman, his act is to creatively melt large blocks of ice while talking to the audience over a soundtrack of tightly-looped music and sound effects. His methods of attempting to melt the ice include breath, salt and a blowtorch. He might also sing songs, make puns, attempt to release a rubber duck from inside the block of ice, or sell photographs of the ice to the audience.

In the 1980s and 90s, he performed at notable alternative comedy venues including Cluub Zarathustra and Malcolm Hardee's Tunnel Club as well as the Edinburgh Festival Fringe.

He is often cited by Stewart Lee as a legend of alternative comedy and by Jo Brand as a favourite act of the 1980s. Lee dedicates his epic poem about stand-up comedy, "I'll Only Go if you Throw Glass," to notable 1980s performers including the Iceman.

In 1995, Irvine appeared in Peter Chelsom's film Funny Bones. In the same year, he shared the Edinburgh Tapwater Award with Malcolm Hardee and Charlie Chuck.

2025 saw an Iceman performance called "The Final Block" at the Bill Murray Comedy Club in London.

== Visual art ==
Since 2014, he has produced art brut paintings under the name aim. 2023 saw his first solo art show at Guggleton Farm Arts in Dorset. He returned to Guggleton Farm Arts for a second show in 2024. In 2025, he held an art show at The Tabernacle in Notting Hill.

== Legacy: book and film ==
The Iceman is the subject of a 2023 book released by Go Faster Stripe called Melt it! The Book of the Iceman. As a result, he appeared on Richard Herring's Leicester Square Theatre Podcast.

The book was adapted to become Melt It! The Film of the Iceman in 2026.
