= Stephen Cheeke =

Stephen Cheeke is an author and senior lecturer in English at the University of Bristol. He attended Kings of Wessex School with comedian Richard Herring, and then went on to read English at the University of Cambridge, where he formed half of a stand-up double-act, God and Jesus, with Simon Munnery. Since his appointment as lecturer at Bristol in 1994, Cheeke has published articles on Shelley, Byron, and Romanticism. In 2007, he was awarded the Keats-Shelley Association of America's essay prize. Cheeke's publications include Transfiguration: The Religion of Art in Nineteenth-Century Literature Before Aestheticism, Byron and Place: History, Translation, Nostalgia, and Writing for Art: The Aesthetics of Ekphrasis.
