= Oliver Double =

British comedian

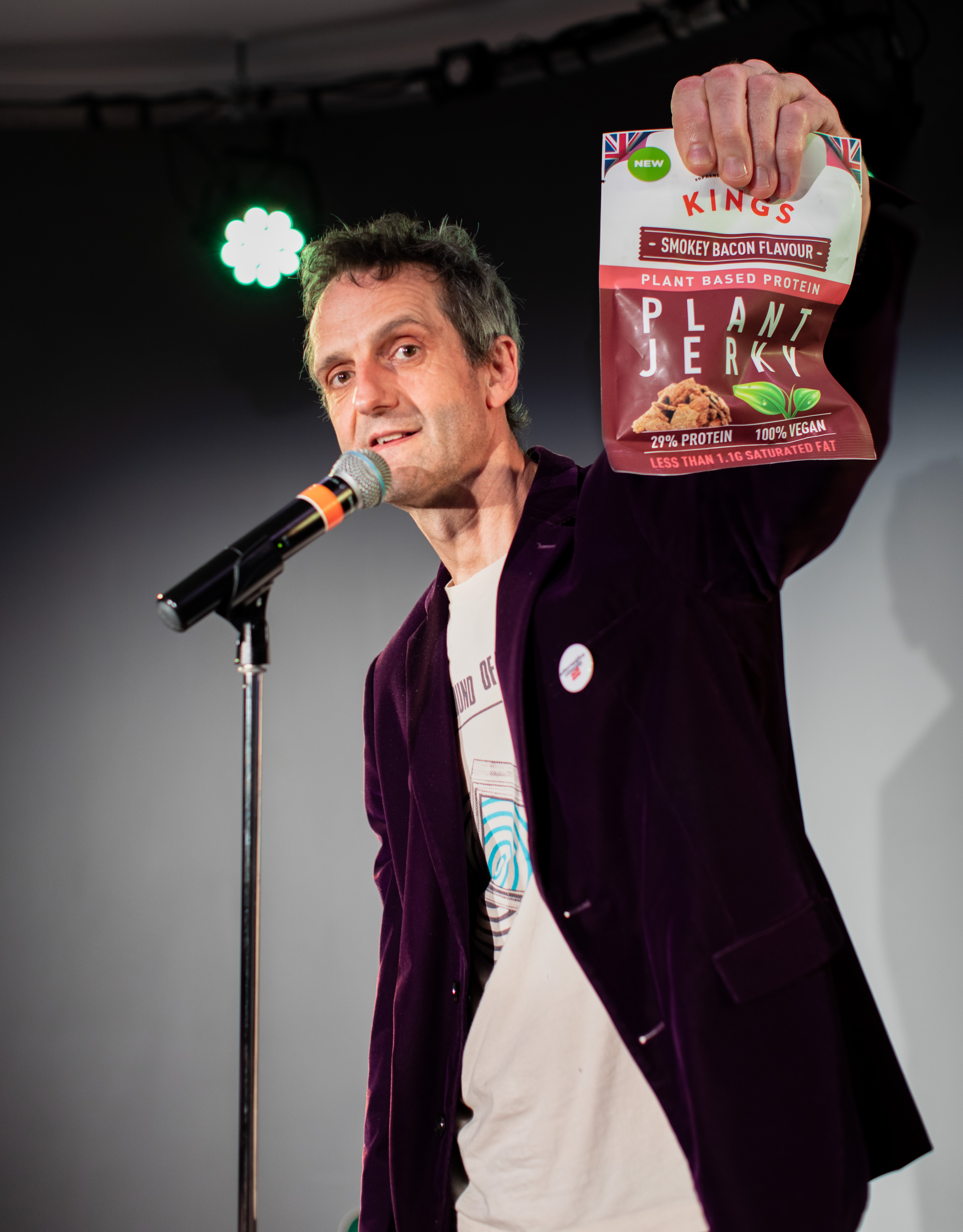
- Oliver Double in 2022
- Born: 22 May 1965 (age 61)

Academic work
- Discipline: Arts
- Sub-discipline: Comedy and Popular Performance
- Institutions: University of Kent
- Notable works: Stand-Up! On Being a Comedian (1997), Alternative Comedy: 1979 and the Reinvention of British Stand-Up. (2020)

Oliver Double (born 22 April 1965) is a British stand-up comedian, author and academic. Since 1999, he has taught comic and popular performance at the University of Kent. His current roles at the university are Reader in Drama and Theatre, and Head of Comedy and Popular Performance.

== Career ==
Double worked as a circuit comedian and founded the Last Laugh comedy club in Sheffield. He continues to perform in his one-person shows Saint Pancreas and Break a Leg and in a monthly comedy club called Funny Rabbit.

He has written books on the subject including 1997's Stand Up!and 2012's Britain Had Talent as well as book chapters and articles about stand-up comedy, alternative comedy,variety theatre and vaudeville.

Double contributed to the creation of the British Stand-Up Comedy Archive (BSUCA) at Kent University's Templeman Library and he produced a monthly podcast about BSUCA called A History of Comedy in Several Objects.

He has appeared on TV programmes and documentaries discussing stand-up comedy, including BBC's Imagine and Horizon. He has also appeared on numerous comedy podcasts including The Alexei Sayle Podcast where he discussed Bertolt Brecht and Book Shambles where he discussed the history alternative comedy with Josie Long and Robin Ince.

Double teaches practical performanceincluding stand-up comedy based on research and many of his students have become professional comedians.

== Books ==
- Stand-Up! On Being a Comedian (1997, Methuen Drama) ISBN 9780413703200
- Getting the Joke: The Inner Workings of Stand-Up Comedy (2004, Bloomsbury) ISBN 978-0413774767
- Britain Had Talent: A History of Variety Theatre (2012, Palgrave Macmillan) ISBN 978-0230284609
- Alternative Comedy: 1979 and the Reinvention of British Stand-Up (2020, Bloomsbury) ISBN 9781350052819

== Collections ==
In 2014 Double helped to establish the British Stand-Up Comedy Archive (BSUCA) at the University of Kent. The archive's founding collection was the archive of comedian Linda Smith. BSUCA has been actively acquiring material ever since, and now holds a wide variety of collections including material from Mark Thomas, Andy de la Tour, Josie Long, Funny Women, Harry Hill, and Jeremy Hardy.

Double also deposited his own material into the archive; the Oliver Double Collection includes extensive audio-visual material (featuring interviews with many comedians), live recordings and show notes.
