= Student loans in Denmark =

Student grants and loans in Denmark are administered by the Ministry of Science, Innovation and Higher Education (Ministeriet for Forskning, Innovation og Videregående Uddannelser).

These universal grants are called Statens Uddannelsesstøtte (SU: State Educational Support Grants). There are two kinds.

There are grants for students attending secondary and tertiary school.

== Secondary school grants ==
All students above age 18 are entitled to a free grant regulated partly by the income of their parents if they are below age 20. The basic rate for students living on their own and older than 20 is 6,820 DKK (as of 2024) a month.

== University grants ==
When a student starts at a university or another kind of higher education institution, they are entitled to SU for a maximum of 72 months. As most university education (with the exception of medicine) takes five years in Denmark, it allows the student to take one year more on their studies than stipulated, or to change their major during their first year without economic consequences.

== Disability grants ==
Any higher education student professionally diagnosed with a permanent disability, such as muscular dystrophy, blindness, deafness or autism, can apply for an additional grant of 8,051 DKK (about US$1,364) a month.

== Student loans ==
If needed, the student may supplement the grant with a student loan of 2,897 DKK (about US$491) that has to be repaid when the student has completed his or her education. Thus a student will normally receive about 67,944 DKK (about US$11,514) a year in grants with an optional 34,764 DKK (about US$5,891) in loans, making a total of 102,708 DKK (about US$17,405).

The government granted SU loans have to be repaid once a student has graduated.

== Tuition ==
All education in Denmark ranging from primary school, the Danish equivalent of high school gymnasiums as well as Universities and all other officially recognised forms of higher education are completely free of charge.

== Post-tertiary education ==
Students at doctoral level (Ph.D. or similar) are not really considered students, and thus they do not receive a student grant. However, most Ph.D. candidates are employed by universities as researchers, and thus receive a fixed salary.
