= Stewart Lee =

British stand-up comedian, screenwriter and director

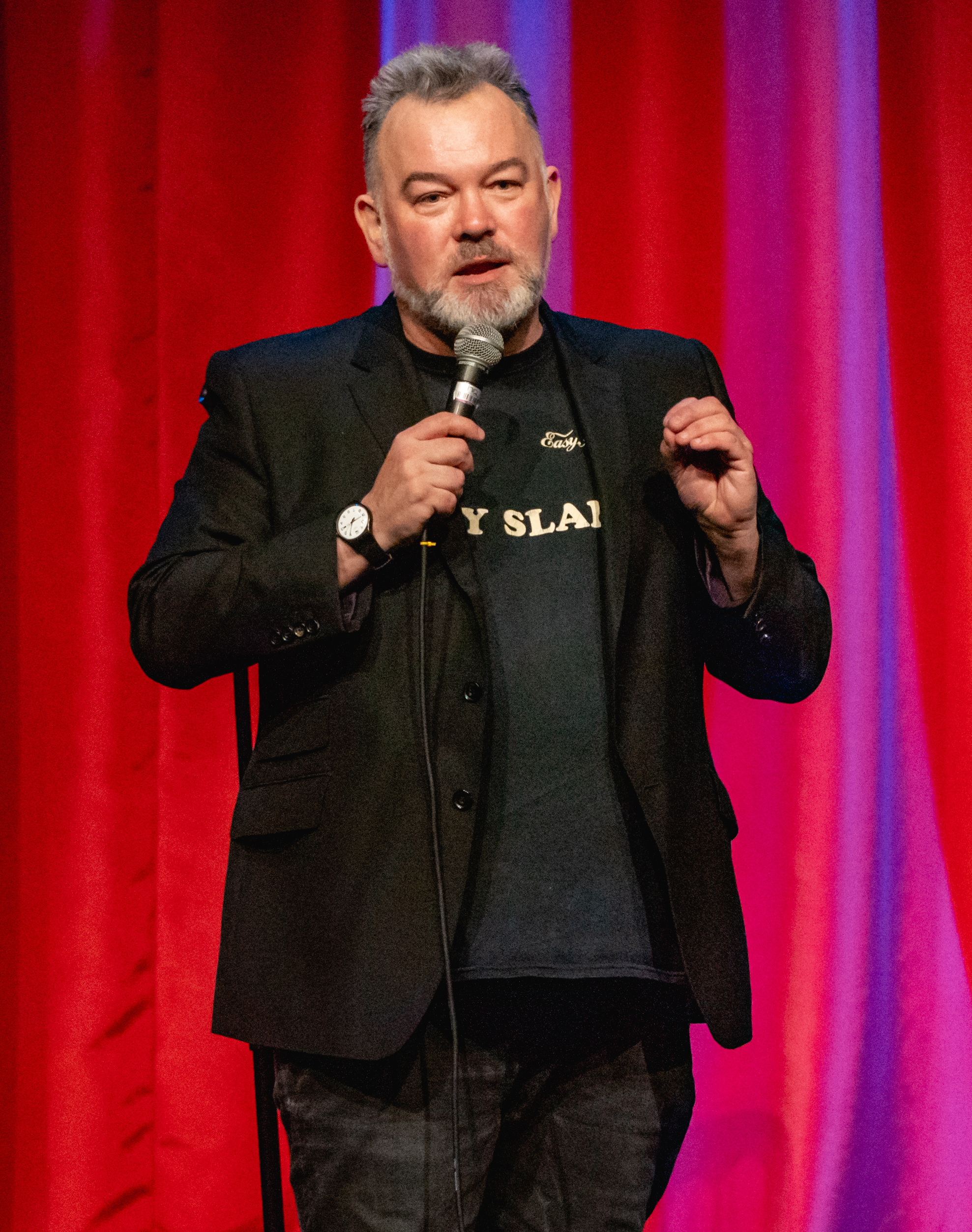
- Lee performing in 2020
- Born: Stewart Graham Lee; 5 April 1968 (age 58); Wellington, Shropshire, England
- Education: Solihull School; University of Oxford
- Spouse: Bridget Christie (m. 2006; sep. 2021)
- Children: 2

Comedy career
- Years active: 1989–present
- Medium: Stand-up comedy; television; Screenwriting
- Subjects: Observational comedy; Satire
- Website: www.stewartlee.co.uk

Stewart Graham Lee (born 5 April 1968) is an English comedian. His stand-up routine is characterised by repetition, internal reference, and deadpan delivery.

Lee began his career in 1989 and formed the comedy duo Lee and Herring with Richard Herring. In 2001, he co-wrote and co-directed the West End hit musical Jerry Springer: The Opera, a critical success that sparked a backlash from Christian right groups who staged a series of protests outside its early performances. In 2011, he won British Comedy Awards for Best Male Television Comic and Best Comedy Entertainment Programme for his series Stewart Lee's Comedy Vehicle. He has written music reviews for publications including The Sunday Times.

In 2009, The Times referred to Lee as "the comedian's comedian, and for good reason" and named him "face of the decade". In 2012, he was placed at No. 9 on a poll of the 100 most influential people in UK comedy. In 2018, The Times named him as the best current English-language comedian.

== Early life and education ==
Stewart Graham Lee was born on 5 April 1968 in Wellington, Shropshire. He was adopted as a child and grew up in Solihull, West Midlands. His adoptive parents separated when he was four, and he was raised by his mother. Lee was privately educated at Solihull School on a scholarship, and received what he calls a "waifs and strays bursary" because he was adopted. He participated in the school's mountain-walking club, which went on regular excursions to Snowdonia; the original members of the grindcore band Napalm Death also took part.

As a teenager, Lee suffered from ulcerative colitis, which he has said caused significant weight loss and made him look "cadaverously thin". He has described how at the age of 16, he was "doing a lot of reading, going to gigs, buying records and listening to the John Peel show". He later read English at the University of Oxford, where he was an undergraduate student at St Edmund Hall, Oxford graduating with an upper second class degree.

== Career ==
=== 1989–1999: stand-up, radio and TV ===
While a student at Oxford in the 1980s, he wrote and performed comedy in a revue group called The Seven Raymonds with Richard Herring, Emma Kennedy and Tim Richardson, but did not perform in the well-known Oxford Revue, though he did write for and direct the 1989 production. Having moved to London and begun performing stand-up comedy after university, he rose to greater prominence in 1990, winning the prestigious Hackney Empire New Act of the Year competition.

With Herring, Lee wrote material for BBC Radio 4's On the Hour (1991), which was anchored by Chris Morris and was notable for the first appearance of Steve Coogan's celebrated character, Alan Partridge, for which Lee and Herring wrote early material. Owing to creative differences with the rest of the cast, Lee and Herring did not remain with the group when On The Hour moved to television as The Day Today.

In 1992 and 1993, he and Herring wrote and performed Lionel Nimrod's Inexplicable World for BBC Radio 4, before moving to BBC Radio 1, for one series of Fist of Fun (1993), followed by three series of Lee and Herring. In 1995 and 1996, two series of a television version of Fist of Fun were broadcast by BBC2, followed in 1998-99 by two series of This Morning with Richard Not Judy. Throughout the late nineties he continued performing solo stand-up (even whilst in the double act Lee and Herring) and collaborated with, amongst others, Julian Barratt and Noel Fielding of The Mighty Boosh. Indeed, though Barratt and Fielding had worked together in the past, the first seeds of the Boosh were sown while working as part of Lee's Edinburgh show King Dong vs Moby Dick in which Barratt and Fielding played a giant penis and a whale, respectively. Lee returned the favour by going on to direct their 1999 Edinburgh show, Arctic Boosh, which remains the template for their live work.

=== 2000–2004: quitting stand-up ===
In 2001, Lee published his first novel, The Perfect Fool. In the same year, he performed Pea Green Boat, a stand-up show which revolved around the deconstruction of the Edward Lear poem "The Owl and the Pussy-Cat" and a tale of his own broken toilet. This would later be condensed to focus mainly on the poem itself, and a 15-minute version aired on Radio 4. In 2007, Go Faster Stripe released a 25-minute edit on CD and 10" Vinyl.

During late 2000 and early 2001, Lee retired from stand-up comedy. 2001 became the first year since 1987 that he did not perform at the Edinburgh Festival Fringe. While Lee found himself gradually performing less stand-up and moving away from the stage, he continued directing for television. Two pilots were made for Channel 4, Cluub Zarathustra and Head Farm, but neither was developed into a series. The former featured all the ingredients that would later appear in Attention Scum, a BBC Two series fronted by Simon Munnery's "League Against Tedium" character, which also featured Kevin Eldon, Johnny Vegas and Roger Mann, as well as Richard Thomas and opera singer Lore Lixenberg.

At the 2003 Edinburgh Festival Fringe, Lee directed Johnny Vegas's first DVD, Who's Ready For Ice Cream?. In 2004, he returned to stand-up comedy with the show Standup Comedian. Lee is a regular music critic for The Guardian. In 2003, he said that his favourite bands include The Fall, Giant Sand and Calexico and that he listens to "a lot of jazz, 60s and folk music”.

=== 2005–2008: Jerry Springer: The Opera ===
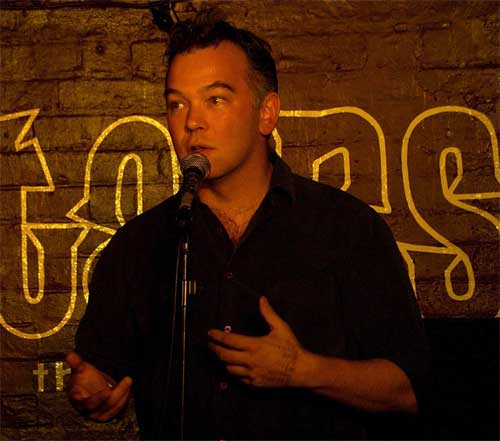
Lee performing in August 2006

In January 2005, Jerry Springer: The Opera, a satirical musical/opera written by Lee and Richard Thomas and based upon The Jerry Springer Show, was broadcast on BBC Two, following a highly successful West End run for several years, and as a prelude to the show's UK Tour. Christian Voice led a number of protest groups who claimed that the show was blasphemous and highly offensive. In particular, they were angered by the portrayal of Jesus. Disputes arose, with supporters claiming that most of the protesters had neither seen the show nor knew of its content. Others supported the right to freedom of speech. Several Christian groups protested at some of the venues used during the UK Tour. The show was broadcast with a record number of complaints prior to its transmission. In total, the BBC received 55,000 complaints. A private court case brought by Christian Voice against Lee and others involved with the production for blasphemy was rejected by a magistrates' court.

At around the time of the Jerry Springer: The Opera broadcast, Lee, Thomas and translator Hermann Bräuer developed Stand Up, a German-language opera set in a fictional London comedy club and performed in Hannover, after an adaptation of Jerry Springer proved impossible for legal reasons.

In 2006, finding himself "really broke" he appeared as a guest on three comedy panel shows. The first was Never Mind The Buzzcocks, where Simon Amstell made frequent mock-offended references to the controversy over Jerry Springer: The Opera. This was followed by appearances on Have I Got News For You and 8 Out of 10 Cats, before Lee decided to quit them altogether. A profile in the Financial Times in 2011 stated Lee did not want to alienate his audience in exchange for quick money by such appearances, as working as a stand-up had been the only thing that had generated reliable income for him.

=== 2009–2010: Comedy Vehicle ===
Stewart Lee's Comedy Vehicle, a comedy series featuring standup and sketches, began a six-episode run on 16 March 2009. The executive producer was Armando Iannucci and the script editor was Chris Morris.

The first episode received positive reviews from The Independent and the Daily Mirror. Lee wrote a negative review of the show in Time Out in which he described himself as "fat" and his performance as "positively Neanderthal, suggesting a jungle-dwelling pygmy, struggling to coax notes out of a clarinet that has fallen from a passing aircraft". The Guardian described it as "the kind of TV that makes you feel like you're not the only one wondering how we came to be surrounded by so much unquestioned mediocrity". One of the show's few negative reviews came in the Sunday Mercury, "His whole tone is one of complete, smug condescension". Lee used the line to advertise his next stand-up tour; he frequently uses negative reviews on his posters to put off potential audience members who are unlikely to like his comedy style.

The first episode was watched by approximately one million viewers. The series was the BBC's second most downloaded broadcast during its run. In May 2010, the series was nominated for a BAFTA TV Award for best comedy programme. The series won a BAFTA for best comedy programme in 2012. The show was cancelled after four seasons on BBC Two.

=== 2011–2019: The Alternative Comedy Experience ===
Although Lee had been supported by less established acts on his comedy tours before (including Josie Long and Tony Law), 2011 marked a shift in his career towards doing a lot to promote other creative comedy talents. He produced At Last! The 1981 Show, featuring veteran alternative comedians including Alexei Sayle and Norman Lovett at the Royal Festival Hall in May 2011 and by 2013 he was fronting a comedy showcase on Comedy Central called The Alternative Comedy Experience which featured 38 comedians who identified with alternative comedy, including Robin Ince, Sam Simmons and Eleanor Tiernan. The show ran for 25 episodes 2013–14, but in 2015 Lee confirmed that Comedy Central were not commissioning a third series.

=== 2020s: recent work ===
In September 2020, Asian Dub Foundation (a political band from London who had a Top 40 hit with "Buzzin'" in 1998) released a song called "Comin' Over Here", which was based on a sketch from Lee's Comedy Vehicle about the UKIP party leader Paul Nuttall. In December 2020, Lee teamed up with Asian Dub Foundation to release a video for the song, which was at that time part of an internet campaign (in the style of LadBaby, Rage Against The Machine et al.) to get the record to number one in time for the chart published by the Official Charts Company on 31 December 2020, thereby making the record the 'Brexit Day Number One'. On 1 December 2020, the song debuted at number 65, making it the week's highest new entry and the best-selling single of the week (though "Comin' Over Here" was absent from the Official Audio Streaming Chart Top 100).

In 2020, Lee wrote the documentary film King Rocker about singer Robert Lloyd and the band The Nightingales. The film featured Frank Skinner, Marc Riley, Robin Askwith, Duran Duran's John Taylor and Samira Ahmed. In 2022, Lee removed his material from Spotify because it refused to stop The Joe Rogan Experience spreading COVID-19 misinformation on its platform.

Lee took part in "A Show for Gareth Richards" at the Edinburgh Fringe Festival 2023, which was staged by fellow comedians Mark Simmons and Danny Ward to honour Richards life after he died in a car-crash in April 2023. The show won the first Victoria Wood award at the Edinburgh Comedy Awards 2023 and raised almost £20,000 for Gareth's family.

In 2023, Lee wrote a contemporary version of the Porter scene for the Royal Shakespeare Company production of Macbeth. Director Wils Wilson said "The Porter is dark, funny, edgy, political, clever, a truth teller – Stewart is all of these things, and straight away I knew I wanted to ask him to write to. He has a really deep understanding of how comedy works. The Porter scene is a strange meta moment in Macbeth and I knew Stewart would enjoy playing with that."

Lee performed his 2024 tour show "Basic Lee" at The Lowry in Salford, which was filmed and broadcast on 20 July by Sky Comedy, as Stewart Lee, Basic Lee: Live at the Lowry. The film was produced by Drum Studios in association with Awkward Films, with producer director Colin Dench.

It was followed by "Stewart Lee Vs The Man-Wulf", which toured the UK through 2025. In 2026 he appeared in Melt It! The Film of the Iceman.

== Style and material ==
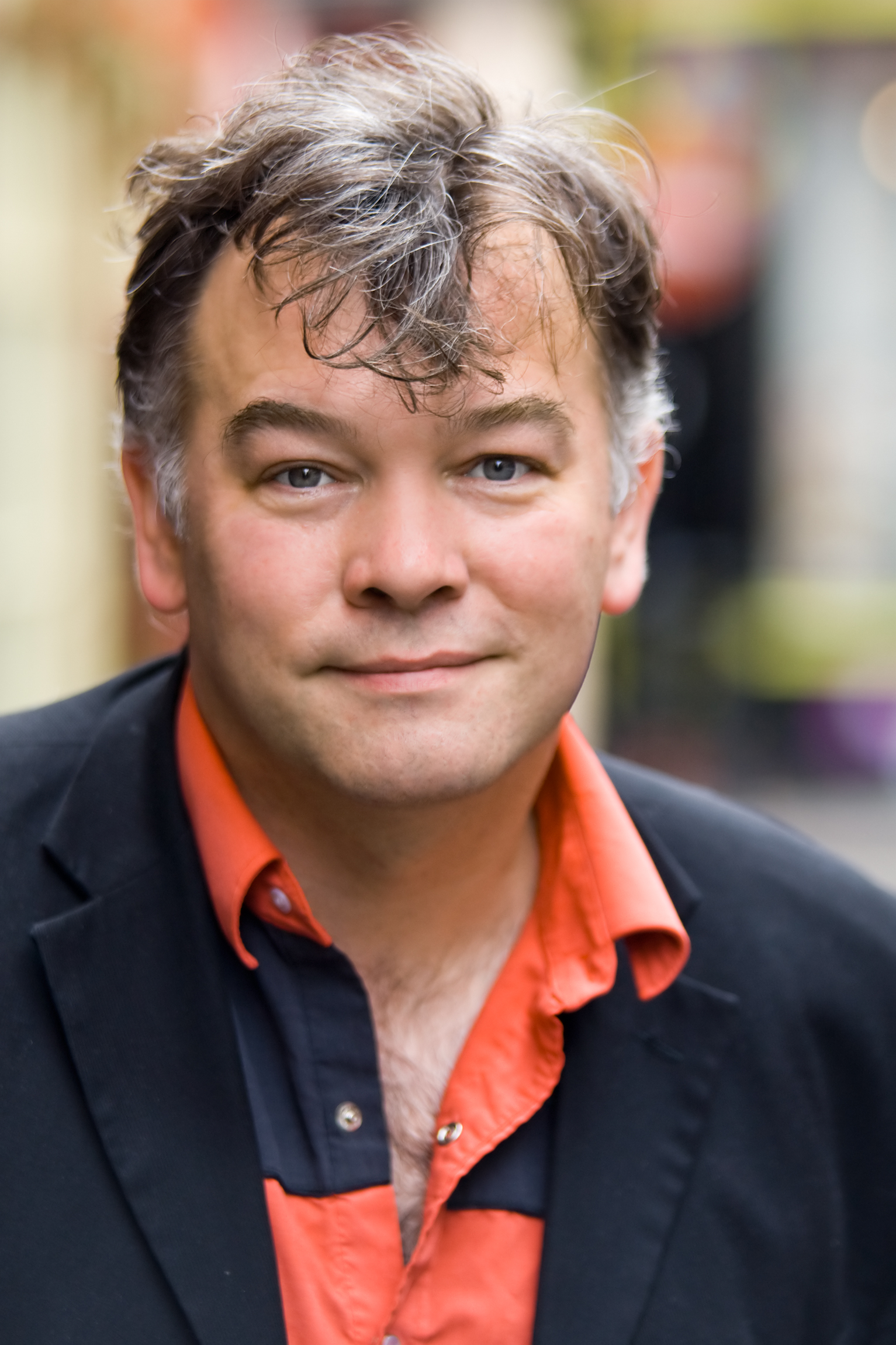
Lee in June 2008

Lee's influences include Ted Chippington, Arnold Brown, Norman Lovett, Jerry Sadowitz, Simon Munnery, Kevin McAleer and Johnny Vegas.

His comedy covers a wide range of forms and subject material. It is often topical, observational, self-deprecating and absurd. Notable routines have focused on topics like religion, political correctness and artistic integrity. He also employs meta-humour, openly describing the structure and intent of the set while onstage, and abolishing the illusion of his routines as spontaneous acts.

In a 2006 Guardian article, Lee wrote that his recent experience of developing the German language opera Stand Up made him realise that much British humour is dependent on the linguistic structures and vocabulary of English allowing for confusion among multiple meanings of statements or words. He highlighted the technique of concealing the true subject of a joke until the last moment, a method he labelled "pull back and reveal", which is usually much more difficult to achieve in German. As a result he said that he had abandoned writing jokes in a traditional sense, instead focusing on writing humorous material about ideas which would be more easily translatable, and stated that felt he was "a better stand-up because of it... Germany kicked away my comedy crutches and taught me to walk unaided".

Lee's delivery uses onstage personae, frequently alternating between that of an outspoken left-wing hero and that of a depressed failure and champagne socialist. In an ironic manner, he often criticises the audience for not being intelligent enough to understand his jokes, saying they would prefer more simplistic material, or enjoy the work of more mainstream "arena" comedians such as Michael McIntyre or Lee Mack. He will also scold them as a bias-seeking "liberal intelligentsia". His routines often culminate in feigned depressive episodes and nervous breakdowns.

Lee caused controversy on his If You Prefer a Milder Comedian tour with a routine about Top Gear presenter Richard Hammond. Referring to Hammond's accident while filming in 2006, in which he was almost killed, Lee joked, "I wish he had been decapitated". When he was doorstepped by a Daily Mail journalist, Lee quoted the routine by replying "It's a joke, just like on Top Gear when they do their jokes". He said, "People who read things like that in the Mail on Sunday and who think Clarkson is funny aren't going to come and see me, so it doesn't matter". Explaining the joke, Lee said:

The idea of what's acceptable and what's shocking, that's where I investigate. I mean, you can't be on Top Gear, where your only argument is that it's all just a joke and anyone who takes offence is an example of political correctness gone mad, and then not accept the counterbalance to that. Put simply, if Clarkson can say the prime minister is a one-eyed Scottish idiot, then I can say that I hope his children go blind.

In an Observer interview, Sean O'Hagan says of the Hammond joke that Lee "operates out in that dangerous hinterland between moral provocation and outright offence, often adopting, as in this instance, the tactics of those he targets in order to highlight their hypocrisy".

After accepting an honorary fellowship from St Edmund Hall, Oxford, Lee gave a lecture to aspiring writers in which he discussed the fact that performers such as Frankie Boyle, Michael McIntyre, Jack Whitehall and Andi Osho used writers who were not credited. He compared the practice to athletes using performance-enhancing drugs. Along with plagiarism and extremism, Lee has brought moral issues surrounding stand-up to the public's attention.

== Personal life ==
Lee married the comedian Bridget Christie in 2006; they separated amicably in 2021. He lives in Stoke Newington and has two children. He is a patron of Humanists UK, a member of Arts Emergency and an Honorary Associate of the National Secular Society. Lee has stated that he had an unofficial autism diagnosis from his GP. Lee is an avid fan of jazz music, especially improvisational jazz. Lee was in a relationship with fellow comedian Rosie Holt from 2024 to 2026.

== Selected works ==
=== Books ===
Title	Publisher	Released	ISBN	OCLC	Notes
Fist of Fun	BBC Books	1995	0-563-37185-4, 978-0-563-37185-4		with Richard Herring
The Perfect Fool	Fourth Estate	2001	1-84115-365-6, 978-1-84115-365-0		novel
How I Escaped My Certain Fate – The Life and Deaths of a Stand-Up Comedian	Faber and Faber	2010	9780571273126	OCLC 712913144	
The 'If You Prefer a Milder Comedian Please Ask For One' EP	Faber and Faber	2012	9780571279845	OCLC 755071819	
Content Provider: Selected Short Prose Pieces, 2011–2016	Faber and Faber	2016	9780571329021	OCLC 955202799	
March of the Lemmings: Brexit in Print and Performance 2016–2019	Faber and Faber	2019	9780571357024	OCLC 1130766718	

==== Other contributions ====
Title	Publisher	Released	ISBN	OCLC	Notes
Sit-Down Comedy	Ebury Press/Random House	2003	0-09-188924-3, 978-0-09-188924-1		contributor to anthology, ed Malcolm Hardee & John Fleming
More Trees to Climb	Granta Books	2009	978-1846271984		by Ben Moor (foreword)
Death To Trad Rock	Cherry Red	2009	978-1-901447-36-1		by John Robb (foreword)
The Wire Primers: A Guide to Modern Music	Verso Books	2009	978-1844674275		chapter on The Fall
I'm a Joke and So Are You: Reflections on Humour and Humanity	Atlantic Books	2018	9781786492616		by Robin Ince (foreword)
The Bloater	Vintage Classics	2022 (reprint)	9781784877804		by Rosemary Tonks (foreword)
Melt It! The Book of the Iceman	Go Faster Stripe	2023	978-1-8384571-5-0		by Anthony Irvine and Robert Wringham (afterword)

=== Stand-up DVD releases ===
Title	Released	Publisher
Stand Up Comedian	17 October 2005	2 entertain
90s Comedian	15 November 2006	Go Faster Stripe
41st Best Stand Up Ever	28 July 2008	Real Talent
If You Prefer a Milder Comedian, Please Ask for One	11 October 2010	Comedy Central
Carpet Remnant World	12 November 2012	Comedy Central
Stewart Lee: Content Provider	24 September 2019	BBC

=== Television DVD releases ===
Title	Released	Publisher
Stewart Lee's Comedy Vehicle – Series One	7 September 2009	2 entertain
Stewart Lee's Comedy Vehicle – Series Two	20 June 2011	2 entertain
Fist of Fun – Series One	2011	Go Faster Stripe
Fist of Fun – Series Two	2012	Go Faster Stripe
The Alternative Comedy Experience – Season One	18 November 2013	Comedy Central
Stewart Lee's Comedy Vehicle – Series Three	10 November 2014	2 entertain
The Alternative Comedy Experience – Season Two	10 November 2014	Comedy Central
Stewart Lee's Comedy Vehicle – Series Four	10 October 2016	2 entertain

=== Documentary film releases ===
Title	Released	Publisher
King Rocker	6 February 2021	Sky Arts

=== Film roles ===
Title	Released	Role
Arthur Christmas	11 November 2011	Lead Elf
Melt It! The Film of the Iceman	6 February 2026	Himself

=== Audio releases ===
- 90s Comedian [2007] (Go Faster Stripe, download)
- Pea Green Boat [2007] (Go Faster Stripe, CD and 10" vinyl)
- 41st Best Stand Up Ever [2008] (Real Talent, CD)
- What Would Judas Do? [2009] (Go Faster Stripe, CD)
- The Jazz Cellar Tape [2011] (Go Faster Stripe, CD)
- Evans The Death featuring Stewart Lee [2012] – Crying Song (B-side to Catch Your Cold)
- John Cage – Indeterminacy – Steve Beresford, Tania Chen, and Stewart Lee [2012] (Knitted Records, CD)

=== Stand-up tours ===
Title	Year	Notes
Stewart Lee	1994	
King Dong vs Moby Dick	1997	
American Comedy Sucks, And Here's Why	1998	One off lecture at Edinburgh Fringe
Stewart Lee's Standup Show	1998	
Stewart Lee's Badly Mapped World	2000	
Pea Green Boat	2002–03	
Stand Up Comedian	2004	DVD Release
90s Comedian	2005	DVD Release
What Would Judas Do?	2007	
41st Best Stand Up Ever	2007	DVD Release, work in progress title: March of the Mallards
Scrambled Egg	2008	Work in Progress – notes toward Stewart Lee's Comedy Vehicle Series 1
If You Prefer A Milder Comedian, Please Ask For One	2009	DVD Release
Vegetable Stew	2010	Work in Progress – notes toward Stewart Lee's Comedy Vehicle Series 2
Flickwerk 2011	2011	Work in Progress – notes toward Carpet Remnant World
Carpet Remnant World	2011–12	DVD Release
Much A Stew About Nothing	2013–14	Work in Progress – notes toward Stewart Lee's Comedy Vehicle Series 3
A Room with a Stew	2015–16	Work in Progress – notes toward Stewart Lee's Comedy Vehicle Series 4
Content Provider	2016–18	Recorded for BBC2 and released on DVD.
Snowflake/Tornado	2019–22	Shown on BBC2 in 2022.
Basic Lee	2022–24	Recorded for Sky
Stewart Lee vs the Man-Wulf	2024-	
