= Go Faster Stripe =

Publisher of stand up comedy recordings

- Type: Production company
- Industry: Film, Publishing, distribution
- Genre: Comedy
- Founded: 2005
- Headquarters: Cardiff, United Kingdom
- Key people: Chris Evans
- Website: http://www.gofasterstripe.com

Go Faster Stripe is an independent film production and distribution company that operates out of the Chapter Arts Centre, in Cardiff, Wales. The company specialises in the recording of live shows by stand-up comedians who, while in the public eye, may not normally be able to get a DVD released through a major label, or who want to avoid forms of censorship that they feel may come with mainstream releases.

Initially a baby clothes retailer, the company used its internet presence to diversify into comedy releases in 2005. Go Faster Stripe are closely associated with Stewart Lee and Richard Herring, who first became famous as the Lee and Herring double act in the 1990s, and whose work they have often published. In addition to Herring and Lee, the company has produced media for acts such as Simon Munnery, Lucy Porter and Robin Ince.

As well as CDs and DVDs, they have also released a 10" vinyl record and a number of books.

== History ==
When comedy fan Chris Evans wished to purchase a DVD of comedian Stewart Lee's (co-writer of Jerry Springer: The Opera) latest live show (90s Comedian) he learned there would not be one: the comic's previous release (Stewart Lee – Stand Up Comedian, released by 2 Entertain) had sold insufficient copies for a major label to consider a future release profitable. Furthermore, the comedy website Chortle claimed that the show's controversial content dissuaded major distribution companies because of fear of retribution from the fundamentalist Christian movement. However, Evans felt that the critically acclaimed show should be recorded. He brought in friends who worked as camera operators and sound recordists and arranged a recording of the show at Cardiff's Chapter Arts Centre. He then used the name of his existing clothes retail company, Go Faster Stripe, to produce a DVD of the show. The DVD sold well enough to generate a profit, and Evans quickly shifted the business towards comedy material. Initially specialising in the work of Lee and Herring, Go Faster Stripe has since diversified into a broader range of comedians.

In 2014, Chris Evans won the Chortle Award for best offstage contribution.

== Censorship and policy ==
Go Faster Stripe claim to only release material by comedians whose work they enjoy. Recently, this has involved returning to previously unreleased work, such as Lee and Herring's television show Fist of Fun. So far around 50% of the comedians that have been approached by Go Faster Stripe have had their work recorded. The company does not ask artists to change their show, and does not censor material. For example, in Richard Herring's ménage à un, he talks explicitly about being masturbated via the hole in the hand of Jesus Christ, which Herring claims would most likely have been edited for a mainstream DVD release. In an interview with Australian comedy listings guide The Groggy Squirrel, Richard Herring said of Go Faster Stripe:

Go Faster don't tell us what we can or can't say and are happy to give faithful representations of the material.

== See also ==
- List of British comedians
- Production companies
