= Richard Thomas (musician) =

- Born: 1964 (age 61–62)
- Origin: England
- Genres: Comedy
- Occupations: Composer, writer, actor
- Instrument: keyboards

Richard Thomas (born 1964) is a British composer, writer, and comedy actor. He is best known for composing, writing and scoring the award-winning Jerry Springer: The Opera with book and additional lyrics co-written with Stewart Lee. Thomas collected the Laurence Olivier Award for Best Musical Score in 2004.

Richard Thomas's comedy career began in 1987, doing a musical act on keyboards. In 2000, he wrote and performed a one-act opera called Tourette's Diva with four actors, which aired at the Edinburgh Festival Fringe. Thomas had the idea for an opera based on Jerry Springer at this time, and wrote it over the next two years, chiefly in workshops at Battersea Arts Centre. Thomas would offer a "Beer for an Idea", where any audience members submitting a good idea would be rewarded with a can of Foster's and poor ideas with a supermarket store brand. After a number of small scale performances of the first act, which was in much the same shape as it remains today, the second act (where the characters descend into hell) was vague and unformed. Thomas brought his friend Stewart Lee in to assist with the writing. Six months later, the opera was in a far more recognisable state, and was snapped up by the National Theatre.

Thomas has also worked on BBC comedy shows such as Attention Scum and This Morning with Richard Not Judy. Starting on 25 February 2007, BBC Two aired his series, Kombat Opera Presents..., comprising five standalone musical parodies of well-known television programmes.

Thomas wrote the libretto for Mark-Anthony Turnage's 2011 opera Anna Nicole, and co-wrote music for the 2010 film Uncle David as a part of the Avant-Garde Alliance. In 2013 Thomas was commissioned by London's LGBT choir The Pink Singers, to bring his humor to writing a piece celebrating the styles and techniques employed by a choir during performances. The Pink Singers performed the première of the resulting two pieces during their 30th anniversary concert at the Troxy Theatre, London. In 2014 he wrote the lyrics for the stage musical of Made in Dagenham.

== Works ==
=== Theatre, dance and opera ===
- Tourette's Diva (2000), music and lyrics
- Jerry Springer: The Opera (2001), music, lyrics and book
- Shoes (2010), music and lyrics
- Anna Nicole (2011), libretto
- Made in Dagenham (2014), lyrics
- Black Sabbath - The Ballet (2023), dramaturg
- Grayson The Musical (2026), music

=== Film and television ===
- This Morning with Richard Not Judy... (1998-1999)
- Attention Scum... (2001)
- Kombat Opera Presents... (2007)
