= Jerry Springer: The Opera =

2001 British musical by Richard Thomas and Stewart Lee

- Music: Richard Thomas
- Lyrics: Richard Thomas; Stewart Lee
- Book: Richard Thomas; Stewart Lee
- Basis: Jerry Springer
- Productions: 2001 Battersea; 2002 Edinburgh; 2003 London; 2005 BBC Two broadcast 2006 UK tour 2009 Sydney; 2018 Off-Broadway; 2019 Manchester

Jerry Springer: The Opera is a British musical written by Richard Thomas and Stewart Lee, based on the talk show Jerry Springer. It contains irreverent treatment of Christian themes, extensive profanity, and surreal images, such as a troupe of tap-dancing Ku Klux Klan members.

The musical ran for 609 performances in London from April 2003 to February 2005 before touring the UK in 2006. It won four Laurence Olivier Awards, including Best New Musical. The first North American performance was at the MGM Grand in Las Vegas. The musical has been performed by a number of American regional theatre companies and made its New York City debut on 29–30 January 2008 at Carnegie Hall. Harvey Keitel starred as Jerry.

In January 2005, its British television broadcast on BBC Two elicited 55,000 complaints. The organisation Christian Voice led street protests against the screening at nine BBC offices and announced their intention to bring blasphemy charges, due to the depictions of the Christian characters in Act II. The Christian Institute attempted to bring a private prosecution against the BBC, but the magistrates' court refused to issue a summons, a decision which was later upheld by the High Court of Justice. Protests continued at tour venues in 2006 and on the Internet.

== Principal roles ==
(Sometimes the roles are shared by the person playing the first role; sometimes the roles are played by additional actors)

- Jerry Springer – Host of Jerry Springer.
- Jonathan Weiruss/Satan – Weiruss, the warm-up man whom Jerry Springer fires for incompetence.
- Steve Wilkos – Head of Security at Jerry Springer.
- Dwight/God – Dwight, a guest on the show who is cheating on his fiancée with two other people. God appears in Act III.
- Peaches/Baby Jane – Peaches, a guest on the show, who is Dwight's fiancée. Baby Jane is an adult baby who appears in all three acts.
- Tremont/Angel Gabriel – Tremont, a guest on the show, a cross-dressing man who is having an affair with Dwight. Angel Gabriel appears in Act III.
- Zandra/Irene/Mary – Zandra, a guest on the show, is the best friend of Peaches, and is having an affair with Dwight. Irene is Shawntel's ashamed mother. Mary appears in Act III.
- Montel/Jesus – Montel, a guest on the show, enjoys dressing as a baby and fouling his own underwear. Jesus appears in Act III.
- Andrea/Archangel Michael – Andrea, a guest on the show, is Montel's lover. Archangel Michael appears in Act III.
- Chucky/Adam – Chucky, a guest on the show, is Shawntel's redneck husband, who does not approve of her career desires. Adam appears in Act III.
- Shawntel/Eve – Shawntel, a guest on the show, dreams of becoming an exotic dancer, but her husband, Chucky, disapproves. Eve appears in Act III.

== Synopsis ==
=== Act I ===
Jerry Springer's frenzied audience greets him as he arrives at his notorious TV talk show. His first guest, Dwight, is cheating on Peaches with Zandra. The three fight, and Jerry's security men break up the battle. Jerry is briefly admonished by his inner Valkyrie. Dwight is also cheating with a cross dresser named Tremont. After a commercial break, Jerry's second guest, Montel, tells his partner, Andrea, that he likes to dress as a baby and that he is cheating on her with Baby Jane, a woman who dresses as a little girl. Jerry's Warm-Up Man contributes to Andrea's humiliation and is fired. Jerry again wrestles with his inner Valkyrie. Jerry's final guests are Shawntel and her husband, Chucky. She wants to be a stripper and demonstrates a dance before her mother, Irene, arrives. Irene attacks Shawntel. Chucky pleads innocence, but Jerry's secret JerryCam camera footage shows that Chucky is a patron of strip clubs and a Ku Klux Klan member. The Klan comes up on stage, and the Warm-Up Man gives Montel a gun. The Warm-Up Man jostles Montel, who accidentally shoots Jerry.

=== Act II ===
Jerry is found injured in a wheelchair, accompanied by his security man, Steve. The scene is Purgatory, a fog-enshrouded wilderness. Jerry meets ghostly versions of his talk show guests, who have all suffered unpleasant fates. Jerry tries to justify his actions to the ghosts. The Warm-Up Man arrives and is revealed to be Satan. Baby Jane asks Satan to spare Jerry's soul. Satan forces Jerry to return to Hell with him to do a special show.

=== Act III ===
Jerry arrives in Hell at a charred version of his Earthly TV studio. The audience is locked into cracks in its walls. Jerry reads cue cards produced by Baby Jane that introduce Satan, who is in charge of the proceedings. Satan seeks an apology for his expulsion from Heaven and wants to reunite Heaven and Hell. Jerry must faithfully read the cue cards, which introduce Jesus, the next guest, who resembles Montel. Jesus and Satan trade accusations. Adam and Eve are next; they are reminiscent of Chucky and Shawntel. They argue with Jesus, and Eve eventually attacks him. Mary, mother of Jesus, who resembles Irene, condemns Jesus. Everyone turns against Jerry, who hopes for a miracle.

God and the angels arrive and ask Jerry to come to Heaven and help God judge Humanity. He accepts the offer, but the angels and devils fight over Jerry; and the talk-show host finds himself suspended over a pit of flame. Jerry launches into a series of glib homilies asking for his life, but finally gives up and makes an honest statement that resounds with his audience. Devils, angels, and everyone sing a hymn of praise to life.

Back on solid ground, Baby Jane tells Jerry that he must go back to Earth. Jerry wakes up in his television studio, having been shot, his life ebbing away as he is cradled in Steve's arms. Jerry gives a final speech, and everyone is joined in sorrow.

== Musical numbers ==
The musical is mostly sung-through by the company. Jerry Springer is the only speaking role with a brief speech from Steve Wilkos.

In 2018, Thomas revised the score. He added 2 songs to "better highlight the parallels between Jonathan and the Devil", rewrote some of the grooves to be "hipper", and added a song for Springer. Thomas also removed some "unnecessarily aggressive" gay slurs.

Act I

1. "Overtly-Ture"
2. "Audience Very Plainsong"
3. "Ladies and Gentlemen"
4. "Have Yourselves a Good Time"
5. "Bigger than Oprah Winfrey"
6. "Foursome Guests"
7. "I've Been Seeing Someone Else"
8. "Chick With a Dick"
9. "Talk to the Hand"
10. "Adverts 1"
11. "Intro to Diaper Man"
12. "Diaper Man"
13. "Montel Cums Dirty"
14. "This is my Jerry Springer Moment"
15. "Mama Gimmee Smack on the Asshole"
16. "I Wanna Sing Something Beautiful"
17. "Adverts 2"
18. "The First Time I Saw Jerry"
19. "Backstage Scene"
20. "Poledancer"
21. "I Just Wanna Dance"
22. "It Has No Name"
23. "Some are Descended from Angels"
24. "Jerrycam"
25. "Klan Entrance" / "End of Act One"

Act II

1. "Gloomy Nurses"
2. "Purgatory Dawning"
3. "Eat Excrete"
4. "The Haunting"
5. "Him Am the Devil"
6. "Every Last Mother Fucker Should Go Down"
7. "Grilled and Roasted"

Act III

1. "Transition Music"
2. "Once in Happy Realms of Light"
3. "Fuck You Talk"
4. "Satan & Jesus Spat"
5. "Adam & Eve & Mary"
6. "Where Were You?"
7. "Behold God"
8. "It Ain't Easy Being Me"
9. "Marriage of Heaven & Hell"
10. "This is my Cheesey Jerry Springer Moment"
11. "Jerry it is Finished"
12. "Jerry Eleison"
13. "Please Don't Die"
14. "Take Care"
15. "Martin's Richard-Esque Finale de Grand Fromage"
16. "Play Out"

== Background ==
Richard Thomas's one-act opera, Tourette's Diva, was performed at London's Battersea Arts Centre (BAC) in May 2000 and featured two members of a dysfunctional family singing obscenities to each other. This led Thomas to create his one-man show How to Write an Opera About Jerry Springer, which was performed at BAC in February 2001.

In May 2001, Thomas returned to BAC with his show How to Write an Opera About Jerry Springer, accompanied by four singers in a tiny studio theatre. It attracted positive press and investment. Stewart Lee teamed up with Thomas, and the two began to write Jerry Springer: The Opera.

== Productions ==
=== Battersea Arts Centre and the Edinburgh Festival (2001-02) ===
The show received its first performance, while still under development, at BAC in August 2001, with a cast of 12. It ran for one week, selling out. When the show returned to BAC in February 2002, the three-week run sold out in advance.

The show was then performed in concert at the Edinburgh Festival in August 2002, selling out. Jerry Springer came to see the show and endorsed it, stating, "I wish I'd thought of it myself." The Edinburgh run included the introduction of character of Tremont – an amalgamation of two previous characters. Australian-born actor, Andrew Bevis, created the new role.

Following the Festival run, Nicholas Hytner offered to include the show in his opening season as director of the National Theatre in London.

=== National Theatre and Cambridge Theatre (2003-05) ===
The first fully staged production of the musical was performed at the National Theatre on 29 April 2003, with a cast of 33, including Bevis as Tremont and Michael Brandon as Jerry. It played to packed audiences and received favourable reviews. The show had its final performance at the National Theatre on 30 September 2003, before moving to the West End.

On 10 November 2003, the show opened at the Cambridge Theatre, with the same cast as the National Theatre production, and ran there until 19 February 2005, before starting a tour of the United Kingdom. The West End run was sponsored by British Sky Broadcasting. On 12 July 2004, David Soul took over the role of Jerry from Michael Brandon.

In 2004, a Broadway production was announced, and then cancelled.

=== 2006 UK tour ===
In September 2005, seven months after the show closed in London's West End, it was announced that the show would tour 21 regional theatres around the United Kingdom. Nine theatres that were originally scheduled to host the show pulled out after Christian Voice threatened to picket them. In addition, Arts Council England turned down a bid for funding, stating that the decision was based on the show's commercial pedigree rather than "pressure from extremist groups".

The tour ran for 22 weeks, starting at the Theatre Royal in Plymouth on 27 January 2006. Immediately prior to the show's opening in Plymouth, it was reported that members of the far-right British National Party were taking part in a local campaign against the performances, although Christian Voice claimed to disapprove of their involvement.

The cast for the tour included several cast members from the London cast, and American actor Rolf Saxon replaced David Soul as Jerry Springer. The tour had a scaled-down set and scaled-down effects as well as a smaller on-stage "audience".

=== New York ===
The show was supposed to open on Broadway in 2005; however, it was never produced.

The show was performed in concert in January 2008 for two performances at Carnegie Hall in New York City with Harvey Keitel playing the title role. The show was picketed on 57th Street by The American 'TFP', who cited the production's mockery of the Crucifixion, Mass, Eucharist, in addition to Jesus' depiction as "fat", and "a little bit a gay" as "blasphemous content".

The show's first formal performance in New York City was 23 January 2018 – 11 March 2018 at the Off-Broadway Pershing Square Signature Center venue with Terrence Mann playing the title role and Will Swenson playing Satan. It was produced by The New Group, directed by John Rando, and extended until 1 April 2018 with Matt McGrath taking over the role of Jerry Springer.

This 2018 run attracted less controversy for blasphemous content. However, the production still faced criticism, with the second and third acts being described as offensive only "to those of us who appreciate quality dramaturgy". Another review suggested the Opera had lost its offensive and comedic edge due to Springer's diminished cultural relevance and shifts in the contemporary discourse. When interviewed in 2018, Richard Thomas defended the Opera's profanity and blasphemy, but admitted to removing homosexual slurs as they were "unnecessarily aggressive".

=== Regional productions ===
==== United States of America ====
The musical premiered on 17 March 2007, in semi concert-style with costumes and a minimal set at the MGM Grand in Las Vegas as a benefit for Las Vegas-based HIV/AIDS charity, Golden Rainbow. The cast featured performers for the then-current versions of The Phantom of the Opera, Mamma Mia!, and other Las Vegas Strip theatrical shows.

The show had its official American premiere in a non-equity production in Chicago at the Bailiwick Repertory Theatre that began on 3 May 2007, with a 14 May opening.

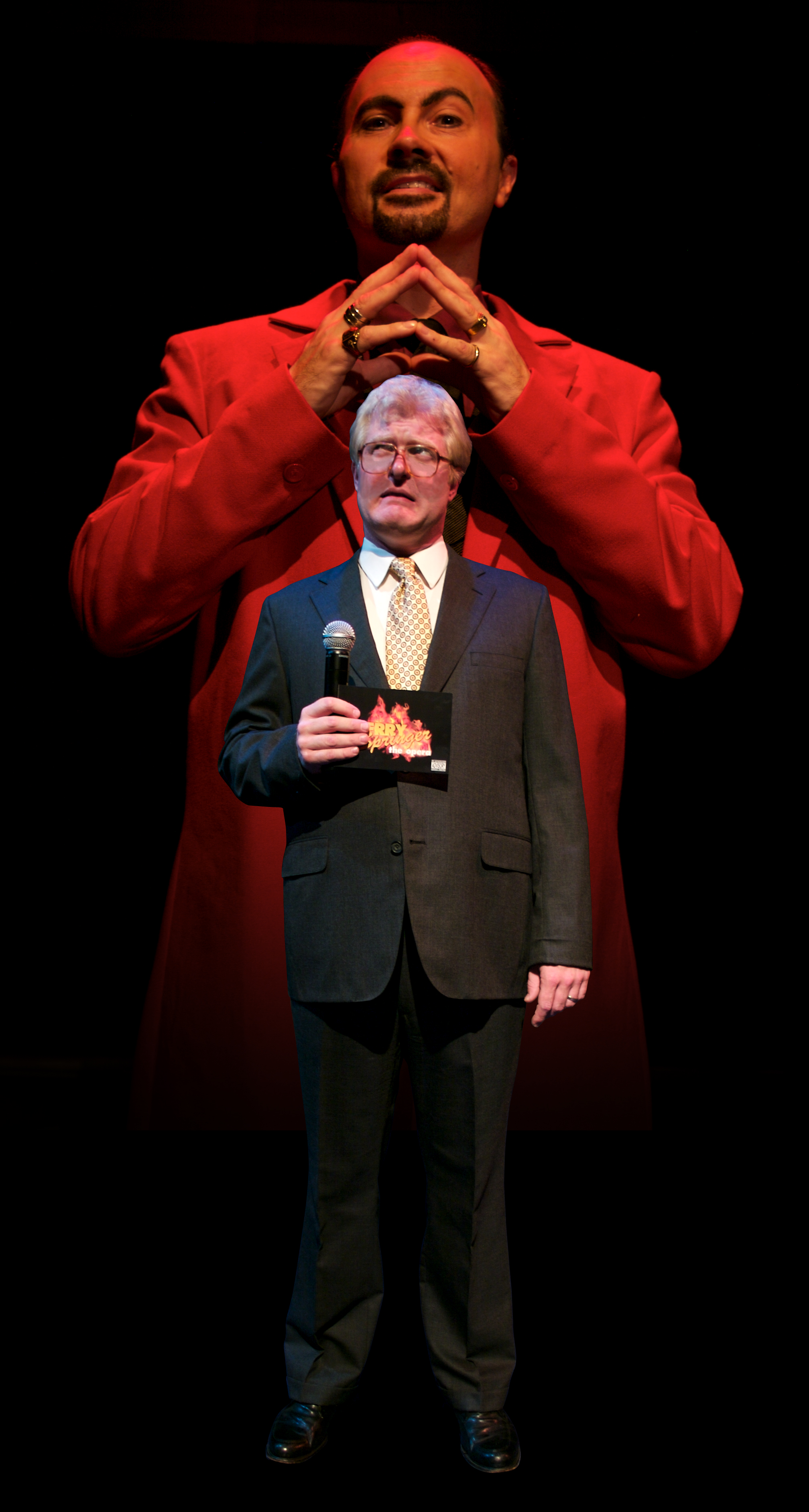
Michael Detroit as Satan, and Jim Hopkins as Jerry Springer in the Playhouse on the Square production in Memphis, TN.

==== Australia ====
The play was staged at the Sydney Opera House from 21 to 26 April 2009, starring David Wenham as Jerry, David Bedella as Jonathan Weiruss/Satan, Ursula Yovich as Andrea/Archangel Michel, Kate Miller-Heidke as Baby Jane, Alison Jiear as Shawntel/Eve, and Marcus Graham as special guest star; also appearing are Andrew Bevis and James Millar.

==== Canada ====
The first Canadian production opened in Toronto, Ontario on 16 January 2009 at Hart House Theatre. It was directed by theatre critic and Director Richard Ouzounian. Music Direction by Lily Ling and choreography by Shannon Cote. The best-selling show in Toronto for the 08 – 09 season. It featured Byron Rouse in the title Role and Jean-Paul Bevilacqua as "Jonathan/Satan". Other original Canadian Cast members include Linda Gallant (Shawntel/Eve), Scott Gorman (Montel/Adam), Jocelyn Howard (Peaches/Baby Jane), Brandi Hewitt (Zandra/Irene/Mary), Ian Bender (Tremont/Gabriel), Benjamin Mehl (Chucky/Jesus), Hayley Toane (Andrea/Angel Michael), Gregory Finney (Dwight/God), and James Schedlich (Steve Wilkos)

==== Ireland ====
NYMT (National Youth Musical Theatre) Ireland staged the first Irish production of Jerry Springer: The Opera in the Grand Canal Theatre, Dublin. Starring Simon Delaney as Jerry and Eoin Cannon as Johnathan Weiruss/Satan, the show took place from 31 Oct – 5 Nov 2011.

==== UK ====
In August 2019 production company Northern Ricochet produced a month-long run of Jerry Springer: The Opera at the Hope Mill Theatre in Manchester. It was directed by James Baker with choreography by Sindy Richardson, lighting by Aaron J. Dootson, design by Victoria Hinton and sound design by Chris Bogg. Playing the title role was Michael Howe, supported by Elizabeth Chadwick as Mary/Zandra/Irene, Robbie Waugh as Chucky/Adam, CiCi Howells as Shawntel, Matt Bond as Dwight/God, Emily Chesterton as Peaches/Baby Jane, Georgina James as Andrea/Archangel Michael, Kai Jolley as Steve, Tom Lloyd as Satan/Jonathan Weiruss, Andrew Patrick-Walker as Tremont/Angel Gabriel, Emily Clarke & Megan Davies-Truin (Swing/Ensemble) and a 13-strong choir.

== Jerry Springer's response ==
Jerry Springer saw the production in Edinburgh and "pronounced it 'wonderful'", adding that he didn't "object to anything in it", and that he "only wish[ed he'd] thought of it first". After the Fringe run, the show was expanded and had undergone a major rewrite, but after watching a West End preview, Thomas noted that "Jerry was not happy" and demanded the change of two lines:

- In Act I, the conclusion of Jerry's retelling of the scandal regarding his payments to a sex worker was changed from 'the next day, it was all over' to reflect the fact that he was elected mayor of Cincinnati three years later.
- In Act III, Springer also requested that his mediation monologue in Hell omit the line 'Nothing is wrong and nothing is right', which Springer objected to on the premise that "I would not say that [... because, for instance,] The Holocaust was wrong". After Thomas argued that the line was necessary because of "how high the stakes were for Jerry in the opera", Springer reluctantly agreed to keep the line.

Thomas later spoke of his appreciation for how "incredibly gracious" Springer was in handling the show:

[The] day after he died, I read the script again and was struck by how much we put the character Jerry through in our show. The outcome is dire for him ... we really stuck the boot in. There is so much in that script that he could have justifiably asked us to remove. Yet, in the end, we only had to change one line. As a result of his generosity and humility, thousands of people have been employed to do the show across the world.

In later years, Springer expanded on his reactions to the show and his portrayal;

I thought they did a really good job. I mean, I'd prefer it were about someone else. It was awkward for me to watch it. For one, it's about yourself, so there's no common experience. There's no one I can ask, "Gee, how did you feel?" I can't call Figaro or Carmen and say, "Hey, how did you feel about your opera?" It's just a very personal moment that I can't express to anybody. And then I felt a little bit awkward because, as I was watching it, everyone was looking at me to see what my reaction was. It was uncomfortable.

== Protests and controversy ==
In addition to the Christian protests at the BBC studios, there were several incidents at venues throughout the 2006 tour. The Manchester Evening News reviewer saw the protests as misplaced, writing "an audacious and scandalous, yet ultimately moral and challenging show that's recommended to anyone who can accept the odd dose of outrage in their lives." Another reviewer recommended, "don't get your knickers in such a twist, drop 'em and enjoy yourself."

- In Birmingham, performances attracted a few protesters, and more commotion was made by audience members arguing when being presented with leaflets.
- In York, leaflets were handed out by small numbers of Salvation Army and Christian Voice protesters.
- In Edinburgh, one man from Christian Voice handed out leaflets on a few of the nights.
- In Cardiff and throughout South Wales, 100 church leaders signed a letter expressing their wishes for the show to be cancelled. The Archbishop of Wales, Barry Morgan, expressed his concern, stating that the show was 'gratuitously offensive'. In further comments he stated, 'The producer of this opera says that if he manages to incite religious hatred then the opera has done its job: I think that is a terrible intention for an opera to have'. Hundreds of Christians protested outside the Wales Millennium Centre, brandishing placards and singing hymns to theatregoers.
- In Aberdeen, the Christian Institute pushed for supporters to lobby local council members, directors on the board of Aberdeen Performing Arts and the Press and Journal. Stewart Lee called this one of the most vitriolic reactions to the show. Ultimately, only a few protesters picketed the theatre, handing out leaflets.

=== Consequences ===
The opposition by Christian Voice caused the cancer charity Maggie's Centres to reject a £3,000 donation from Jerry Springer: The Opera. Christian Voice threatened to picket their centres, which provide palliative care to cancer sufferers and their families. It claimed it had warned the charity that accepting cash from a show full of "filth and blasphemy" would be a public relations disaster.

In January 2007, Christian Voice, represented by Stephen Green, attempted to prosecute BBC director-general Mark Thompson for blasphemy over the show. A summons was refused due to lack of prima facie evidence that a crime had been committed, and a provision of the 1968 Theatres Act which enshrines the right of free expression in theatrical works. An appeal to the High Court was dismissed on 5 December 2007, with the decision of the lower court upheld on all counts and ruling that it was reasonable to conclude that the play "in context" could not be considered as blasphemous.

Asked about the controversy during an interview with The Observer in 2009, Lee stated:

If you have been on the verge of becoming a millionaire and that has not happened because of far-right pressure groups, and your work has been banned and taken apart, and you've been threatened with prosecution, and the police have advised people involved with your production to go into hiding, and bed and breakfasts won't have the cast to stay because they're blasphemers, and you have to cross a BNP picket line to go to work in Plymouth, you do start to think, well, what can be worse than that?

Asked if the experience affected his stand-up comedy, Lee replied: "It did make me feel there was not much point ever trying to reach a mass audience with anything interesting and provocative. You just run the risk of being misunderstood on a large scale."

== Profanity ==
The musical contains extensive profanity. It has been accused of including "8,000 obscenities"—it is not known where this count originated, but the 8,000 figure is popularly quoted. 8,000 obscenities over the show's 120-minute runtime would imply that there were 66 obscenities a minute, and thus more than 1 per second. Several publications, including the Daily Mail and The Sun, claimed a figure of "3,168 mentions of the word fuck and 297 of the word cunt". According to the BBC investigation, however, there were 96 uses of "fuck" and nine uses of "cunt". The BBC report said: "While a substantial number, this was not necessarily unacceptable in terms of late night terrestrial television." The numbers reported by the Mail and the Sun were found by multiplying the number of cast members singing a profanity at the same time, i.e. the reported 297 uses of the word cunt is the result of multiplying the 33 cast members by the nine occurrences of the word.

According to writer Stewart Lee, there are 174 swear words in all.

== UK Parliament ==
The BBC's role in broadcasting the musical was raised in the UK Parliament. Generally, they voiced more concern over the reactions of Christian groups than over the show itself.

Early Day Motion no 488, THE BBC AND JERRY SPRINGER – THE OPERA, was tabled on 12 January 2005, by Jeffrey Donaldson MP:

That this House regards with dismay the decision by the BBC to broadcast Jerry Springer – The Opera on BBC2, causing widespread offence to Christians and those of other faiths by its mocking portrayal of Jesus Christ, Holy Communion and some of the central tenets of the Christian faith; condemns the show's juvenile and offensive use of repeated profanity in an attempt at humour; further notes that it is particularly serious that the show should have been transmitted by the publicly-funded national broadcaster and questions whether it places the Corporation in breach of its Charter; laments the arrogant dismissal of Christian concerns by the content of programmes aired by the BBC; and calls on the government publicly to rebuke the corporation for its attack on the religion adhered to by over 70 per cent. of the UK population and for its lowest common denominator approach to ethics in its attempts to chase ratings.

EDM no 531, BBC AND FREEDOM OF EXPRESSION, was later tabled on 17 January 2005 by Evan Harris MP:

That this House applauds the decision by the BBC to stick by its decision to broadcast, 'Jerry Springer – The Opera' on BBC2 on 8 January, despite the orchestrated campaign from religious pressure groups, the irresponsible actions of one of which caused alarm and distress to the families of BBC executives by making public their contact details and exposing them to hate attacks; believes that individuals have a choice whether or not to watch programmes which they are warned might be offensive to them, and that broadcasters have the right and duty to broadcast a variety of work, some of which may receive differing critical opinions; recognises that in any case this particular programme was of undoubted artistic merit as demonstrated by the opera having attracted a record number of awards, and substantial theatre audiences; reminds the BBC that its own study What the World Thinks of God suggested Britain was the most religiously sceptical country in the world and that as a publicly-funded national broadcaster the Corporation has a duty to reflect society in its output which will entail broadcasting programmes which some religious people find offensive; and calls on the BBC to stand firm against the increasingly assertive religious pressure being applied to restrict freedom of expression.

EDM no 1270, JERRY SPRINGER DVD WITHDRAWAL, was tabled on 14 December 2005 by Don Foster MP:

That this House agrees with Noam Chomsky that 'if you're really in favour of free speech, then you're in favour of freedom of speech precisely for views you despise. Otherwise, you're not in favour of free speech'; regrets the apparent decision of Sainsbury's and Woolworths to respond to minimal pressure by withdrawing DVDs of Jerry Springer: the Opera from sale in their stores; recognises that Jerry Springer: the Opera is a widely acclaimed work of art having won eight major awards including best musical at the Olivier Awards, the Critics' Circle Awards and the Evening Standard Awards; notes that vociferous minority pressure groups now increasingly target works of art with the outcome that the majority are sometimes denied the choice to judge works for themselves; and calls on the Government to ensure that freedom of expression remains a central principle of society and to protect the ability of individuals to explore comprehensively and lawfully all aspects of culture.

EDM no 488 received 5 supporting signatories. EDM no 531 received 16 signatories. EDM no 1270 received 40 signatories.

== Awards and nominations ==
The show won four awards at the 2004 Laurence Olivier Awards; Best New Musical, Best Sound Design, Best Actor in a Musical (David Bedella) and Best Performance in a Supporting Role in a Musical (the Chorus). It also won Best Musical at the 2004 Critics' Circle Theatre Awards, Best Musical at the 2003 Evening Standard Awards and the 2004 WhatsOnStage.com Theatregoers' Choice Awards Best New Musical and London Newcomer of the Year (Benjamin Lake). The show won four awards at the 2003 Nowt2Do.Com Awards, Best Actor in a Musical (David Bedella) Best Actress in a Musical (Alison Jiear) Best London Show and Most Entertaining Show. In 2006, the show won Best Touring Production at the TMA Awards.

It is the only show ever to win all four "Best Musical" awards.

=== Original London production ===
Year	Award Ceremony	Category	Nominee	Result
2003	Evening Standard Award	Best Musical		Won
2003	Nowt2Do.Com Award	Best London Show		Won
2003	Nowt2Do.Com Award	Best Actor in a Musical	David Bedella	Won
2003	Nowt2Do.Com Award	Best Actor in a Musical	Wills Morgan	Nominated
2003	Nowt2Do.Com Award	Best Actress in a Musical	Alison Jiear	Won
2003	Nowt2Do.Com Award	Best Ensemble Performance		Nominated
2003	Nowt2Do.Com Award	Must See Musical		Nominated
2003	Nowt2Do.Com Award	Funniest Night Out		Nominated
2003	Nowt2Do.Com Award	Most Entertaining Night Out		Won
2003	Nowt2Do.Com Award	Best Spectacle		Nominated
2003	Nowt2Do.Com Award	Most Unusual Night Out		Nominated
2004	Critics' Circle Theatre Award	Best New Musical		Won
2004	Critics' Circle Theatre Award	Best Actor in a Musical	David Bedella	Won
2004	Critics' Circle Theatre Award	Best Actor in a Musical	Michael Brandon	Nominated
2004	Critics' Circle Theatre Award	Best Actress in a Musical	Alison Jiear	Nominated
2004	Critics' Circle Theatre Award	Best Performance in a Supporting Role in a Musical	The Chorus	Won
2004	Critics' Circle Theatre Award	Best Director	Stewart Lee	Nominated
2004	Critics' Circle Theatre Award	Best Theatre Choreographer	Jenny Arnold	Nominated
2004	Critics' Circle Theatre Award	Best Sound Designer	Mike Walker	Won
2004	Laurence Olivier Award	Best New Musical		Won
2004	Laurence Olivier Award	Best Actor in a Musical	David Bedella	Won
2004	Laurence Olivier Award	Best Actor in a Musical	Michael Brandon	Nominated
2004	Laurence Olivier Award	Best Actress in a Musical	Alison Jiear	Nominated
2004	Laurence Olivier Award	Best Performance in a Supporting Role in a Musical	The Chorus	Won
2004	Laurence Olivier Award	Best Director	Stewart Lee	Nominated
2004	Laurence Olivier Award	Best Theatre Choreographer	Jenny Arnold	Nominated
2004	Laurence Olivier Award	Best Sound Design	Mike Walker	Won
2004	Theatregoers' Choice Award	Best New Musical		Won
2004	Theatregoers' Choice Award	Best Actor in a Musical	David Bedella	Nominated
2004	Theatregoers' Choice Award	Best Actor in a Musical	Michael Brandon	Nominated
2004	Theatregoers' Choice Award	Best Actress in a Musical	Alison Jiear	Nominated
2004	Theatregoers' Choice Award	London Newcomer of the Year	Benjamin Lake	Won
2004	Theatregoers' Choice Award	Best Choreographer	Jenny Arnold	Nominated

=== Original UK tour ===
Year	Award Ceremony	Category	Nominee	Result
2006	TMA Award	Best Touring Production		Won

=== 2018 Off Broadway Production ===
Year	Award Ceremony	Category	Nominee	Result
2018	Lucille Lortel Awards	Outstanding Musical		Nominated
2018	Lucille Lortel Awards	Outstanding Lead Actor in a Musical	Terrence Mann	Nominated
2018	Lucille Lortel Awards	Outstanding Featured Actor in a Musical	Sean Patrick Doyle	Nominated
2018	Lucille Lortel Awards	Outstanding Featured Actress in a Musical	Tiffany Mann	Won

== Television broadcast ==
Jerry Springer: The Opera was the subject of controversy when the BBC televised the musical on 8 January 2005 as part of an evening of Jerry Springer-themed programming on BBC Two. News of the screening had prompted TV standards campaigners Mediawatch to write a letter to the Chairman of the BBC Governors, Michael Grade, asking him to reconsider the decision to show the musical.

On 7 January, the day before the broadcast, the BBC announced that it had received over 47,000 complaints about its plans to screen the musical – at the time the most complaints ever received about a British television broadcast. Many commentators, including the BBC, attributed such a high volume of complaints to an orchestrated campaign by various Christian groups. Supporters of the BBC's broadcasting of the show pointed out that the supposedly blasphemous content was clearly presented as a fantasy in the mind of the dying central character and was not intended to be a serious comment on Christ or Christian theology. John Beyer, chairman of Mediawatch-UK, argued that the BBC should shoulder much of the blame for the campaign against the musical since they had promoted the musical as "pushing back the boundaries of taste" and "controversial" when it had never been intended to offend the groups who campaigned against it.

In November 2005, a DVD of the show was made available in the UK by Pathé through 20th Century Fox Home Entertainment. However, because of complaints by customers, Sainsbury's and Woolworths decided to stop selling the DVD. Many blogs and Liberal Democrat MP Lynne Featherstone condemned the action from the stores as being corporate censorship, something which both retailers deny. Most other retailers continued to stock the DVD.

On the DVD's commentary, it was stated that it would not be possible to tour the show in the UK due to pressure from religious groups, but since the release of the DVD, the UK Tour 2006 went forward. The DVD commentary also stated that Stewart Lee was unhappy with an unscripted action by Alison Jiear. In the "Adam and Eve and Mary" scene in Act II, Jiear runs her hand under Jesus's loincloth, prompting a surprised look from Leon Craig, the actor playing Jesus. Lee said on the commentary, "I wish she hadn't done that".
