= Lee and Herring (radio series) =

- Running time: 60 mins
- Country of origin: United Kingdom
- Language: English
- Home station: BBC Radio 1
- Starring: Stewart Lee; Richard Herring; Peter Baynham; Kevin Eldon; Others
- Written by: Stewart Lee; Richard Herring
- Produced by: Chris Neill; Kathy Smith; Sarah Smith
- Original release: 19 July 1994 – 20 December 1995
- No. of series: 3
- No. of episodes: 21

Lee and Herring is a British radio series broadcast on BBC Radio 1 in 1994 and 1995, named after the comedy double act who hosted it, Lee and Herring.

The show ran for three series and a total of nineteen hour-long episodes. It followed on from their previous Radio 1 series, Fist of Fun, and was one of a number of comedy and music shows being produced for Radio 1 at the time: other notable examples being shows hosted by Chris Morris and Armando Iannucci. The fact that the bulk of the show was live, and to some extent unscripted, gave the programmes a more relaxed feel, with the presenters somewhere in between their genuine personalities and the comic personas adopted for their act. The show was produced by Chris Neill, Sarah Smith and Kathy Smith.

The series served as a testing ground for new ideas, and many of the characters and items introduced in the series were adapted for later television projects. Lee and Herring were keen to pursue a fourth series, but Radio 1 ceased its comedy output at the beginning of 1997.

== Presenters ==
Ostensibly the straight-man of the pair, Lee's character was that of a passive, sarcastic and often pretentious curmudgeon. He also provided a great deal of the music for the programmes (as the show was made by the Light Entertainment department, and the duo had to bring in their own records), and his rather idiosyncratic tastes made for some interesting musical interludes.

In contrast to his comic partner, Herring's persona was that of a cheerful, optimistic and naive character. He apparently contributed less music to the show, but occasionally poured scorn over Lee's odder musical selections.

== Regular contributors ==
Peter Baynham reprised his tragic comic persona, first heard in Fist of Fun, for the new series. Portrayed as a lonely, 30-year-old unemployable virgin living in a bedsit in Balham, he was an unlikely choice for 'lifestyle guru', and was continually bullied by Herring. In the later series, the character was renamed from 'Peter Baynham' to simply 'Peter'.

A longstanding Lee and Herring contributor, Kevin Eldon read out the Listings as well as playing numerous characters in sketches. At the end of the first series he was unmasked as a hair-obsessed alien and was killed by some Immac hair remover. He returned in the second series with little explanation and resumed his role. In the third series, he took on the persona of an apparently angry but mediocre anti-establishment comic, often denouncing the government as 'fascists', to the mockery of Lee and Herring.

== Other Contributors ==
- Rebecca Front provided character voices for recorded segments and also made some live appearances.
- Ronni Ancona usually appeared live, and provided voices for some regular characters, and contributed to the Listings.
- Sally Phillips made numerous live appearances throughout the third series, contributing to the Listings and playing some characters.
- Alistair McGowan appeared in various sketches, notably impersonating such diverse figures as Prime Minister John Majors (sic) and Jesus Christ.
- Peter Serafinowicz appeared in numerous recorded segments throughout the third series as various characters.
- Mel Giedroyc, Sue Perkins, Ben Moor and Tom Binns made occasional appearances in sketches during the first series. Binns' hospital radio DJ character, Ivan Brackenbury, made an early appearance on one of the shows.
- Roger Mann appeared in his own segment entitled Roger Mann: Europe's Scariest Man.
- Danny O'Brien made a few appearances in the first series with a semi-regular feature about the Internet.
- Annabel Giles was the duo's 'celebrity friend', who occasionally appeared as a special guest.

== Regular Features ==
- The Listings were traditionally read out by Kevin Eldon, sometimes with the assistance of one of the other regulars. They contained details of fictional events around the country that were so ridiculous as to be of interest to virtually nobody. The concept was first used in Lee and Herring's contributions to On The Hour, and would resurface in the Fist of Fun TV series and TMWRNJ.
- Peter's Lifestyle Hints was a feature carried over from the radio version of Fist of Fun, and one that would continue into the TV version. Peter would contribute lifestyle hints that only served to underline the loneliness and tragedy of his life.
- Simon Quinlank's Hobby Slot was a feature presented by the unstable character, Simon Quinlank, in which he detailed one of his many unusual hobbies. (See also 'Characters' below)
- A Celebration of Mediocrity appeared throughout the first series, and was based around the rationale that, while great performers are lauded, and bad ones are mocked, mediocre performers were thus deserving of some vague, half-hearted appreciation. The feature gave suggestions on how to celebrate the mediocre output of such figures as Steve Guttenberg, William Makepeace Thackeray, Level 42 and, of course, Lee and Herring themselves.
- Histor's Eye was a spoof children's educational TV series, "produced by Sky TV". The series featured two pirate crows, Histor and his dim sidekick Pliny, who each week travelled through time to a historical event. Pliny routinely peppered the dialogue with awful bird-related puns, going to increasingly extreme lengths to find an avian pun in each and every sentence uttered by Histor and the other characters. The other running joke of the segment was that Histor's commentary frequently had a xenophobic or right wing bias, with the rather sinister implication that the show was being used to influence the opinions of children. The segment appeared occasionally throughout the second and third series, and eventually transferred to television as part of TMWRNJ. Histor was played by Richard Herring, and Pliny was played by Stewart Lee.
- Ian News, also known as I am Called Ian, I am, was a news bulletin aimed specifically at people called Ian. Supposedly this was part of a Radio 1 initiative called The News for Your Name, in which each listener would somehow hear a separate broadcast specific to their name. The presenters were the competent Ian Lewis (Herring) and the inept but opinionated Ian Ketterman (Lee). Composed mainly of minor stories about celebrities called Ian, the broadcasts also revealed a conflict in the world of people called Ian: that people with the spelling 'Iain' were hated and discriminated against by the 'Ian' majority. The Ian News made a brief appearance on television, in two short segments in the second series of Fist of Fun.
- Roger Mann: Europe's Scariest Man featured Roger Mann reciting a ludicrous tale of the paranormal. Mann later featured in the first series of TMWRNJ as Roger Crowley.
- An Internet Feature, hosted by Danny O'Brien, appeared irregularly throughout the first series. O'Brien described unusual articles he had found on the internet, and listeners were asked to send in examples that they had discovered.
- Parables: the series featured a handful of spoof parables, most memorably a retelling of the Prodigal Son, which also transferred to television with Fist of Fun.
- The Nation's Favourite Chew Bar was a typically odd feature during the second series. Listeners were invited to vote on their favourite and least favourite chew bars.
- Hearts of Paper was a spoof of the Hearts of Gold awards and continued the theme of celebrating mediocre achievements. During the third series, listeners were invited to nominate their friends for doing vaguely admirable things, and the action judged most mediocre would be awarded a Heart of Paper.

== Characters ==
Numerous fictional characters were introduced during the series, many of whom later transferred to television.

- Simon Quinlank (Kevin Eldon): One of the most celebrated Lee and Herring characters was introduced in the very first show of the series. Quinlank was obsessed with doing hobbies, and each week he presented a short piece in which he described how to do one of them. However, he was clearly a very disturbed individual, and the hobbies described often involved criminal activities including vandalism, harassment, assault and arguably even murder. Quinlank despised 'nerds' - he made a point of belittling trainspotters and autograph hunters - but seemed oblivious to the fact that his dangerous obsessions placed him far further outside social norms than the subjects of his mockery. Indeed, as time went on, Quinlank became increasingly convinced of his own superiority, eventually proclaiming himself a God. The final radio installment revealed that Quinlank's personality was, in part, due to his overbearing, unloving and emotionless parents. The character transferred to television on Fist of Fun and the second series of TMWRNJ.
- Rod Hull (Kevin Eldon): Based extremely loosely upon the children's entertainer of the same name, Rod Hull first appeared in series three, during a comically feeble anti-drugs campaign featuring minor celebrities who were totally unsuited to Radio 1's demographic. Kevin Eldon apparently had a cold that particular week, and instead of an accurate Rod Hull impersonation, he produced a shrill, shrieking caricature that bore virtually no relation to the real Rod Hull. The absurdity of the character caught on, and he returned in subsequent weeks as one of Richard Herring's 'celebrity friends'. During this time, questions were continually raised as to whether the character was the real Rod Hull, or just a deranged impostor. This evolved into the incarnation of the character seen in the second series of Fist of Fun, where The False Rod Hull is an insane impersonator claiming to be the man himself. The character also made a cameo appearance in the first series of TMWRNJ, and was to have become a regular in the second series, but this idea was dropped after the real Rod Hull died shortly before the series began.
- Mr Kennedy (Stewart Lee) and Mr Harris (Richard Herring): Two very different but equally bad teachers. Mr Harris is dedicated and hard-working, but completely unable to control or win the respect of his pupils. Mr Kennedy, on the other hand, prides himself on winning their respect, but achieves very little else: his overtly anti-establishment method of teaching only results in his students failing their exams. The characters later appeared in Fist of Fun and TMWRNJ.
- The Small Boy From the McCain's Oven Chip Ad (Ronni Ancona): Or, to give him his full title, The small boy from the McCain's Oven Chip ad who says "Most excellent" in a posh voice, when obviously it's only a cool thing to say if you're American and in the Bill and Ted films. This rather self explanatory character was inspired by a child actor who delivered the incongruous line in a contemporary advertisement, and was indicative of Lee and Herring's habit of seizing upon something utterly obscure and exaggerating it to absurdity. Like Rod Hull, the character appeared in Richard Herring's anti-drugs campaign, and was later shown to be one of his 'celebrity friends'.
- Other characters based on real people and played by Kevin Eldon during the third series were Hunter from ITV's Gladiators (portrayed as slightly effeminate and obsessed with fairy cakes) and weatherman Fred Talbot (who discovered Atlantis after trying to sail his floating rubber weather map around the British Isles). He also played Peter's occasional - and incoherent - companion, The Old Man Who Drinks Medicine Outside Balham Tube Station.

== Running gags ==
- The teen soap opera Hollyoaks, which had recently started on Channel 4, was a constant target of ridicule. One show was introduced as The All New Lee and Herringoaks, in which the presenters were replaced with poorly acted teenage versions of themselves. The most-referenced character from the series was known simply as "The blonde girl from Hollyoaks who can't act very well, but looks quite attractive from certain angles".
- The animosity between the duo and 'respected playwright Patrick Marber' led to some digs at Marber's expense.
- The duo's dislike of political satire was often expressed. Lee and Herring had worked on the BBC Radio 4 satirical sketch show Week Ending, and harboured disdain for lazy satirists. Rory Bremner was often a subject for mockery. On the rare occasions that politics was mentioned, it was always done in a deliberately inept manner: John Major was consistently referred to as John Majors.

== Transmission Dates ==
- Series One (seven episodes): 19 July 1994 – 29 August 1994
- Series Two (six episodes): 9 January 1995 – 13 February 1995
- Series Three (six episodes): 15 November 1995 – 20 December 1995
