= British Comedy Guide =

Website covering British comedy

- Screenshot of the BCG homepage on 15 January 2016
- Website type: TV, radio, and film guide of British comedy
- Owners: Mark Boosey and Aaron Brown
- Website: comedy.co.uk
- Registration: Required to post (free)
- Launched: August 2003
- Current status: Active

British Comedy Guide or BCG (formerly the British Sitcom Guide or BSG) is a British website covering British comedies. BCG publishes guides to TV and radio situation comedy, sketch shows, comedy dramas, satire, variety and panel games. The website also runs The Comedy.co.uk Awards and hosts multiple podcast series.

Reportedly, British Comedy Guide attracts over 500,000 unique visitors a month, making it Britain's most-visited comedy-related reference website.

== Background ==
The logo for the British Comedy Guide between 11 May 2009 and 1 January 2011

The BCG logo between 2 January 2011 and 15 January 2016

The website was founded in August 2003 initially as the British Sitcom Guide (BSG), a website focused on British sitcom TV programmes. The website was created by Mark Boosey, a freelance web developer, originally as a hobby. However, in 2008, the remit of the website was relaunched as British Comedy Guide. Other features added since the site's re-launch in 2008 include a series of podcasts, a section featuring interviews with people working in the British comedy industry, and a Twitter-based news service.

The website went through another relaunch in 2016, where it underwent a redesign of the layout and a new logo which depicts a yellow crown on the word 'Guide'.

In 2015, BCG's data specialist Ian Wolf was awarded the inaugural "Unsung Hero" at the first FringePig Ham Fist awards for his work collating reviews during that year's Edinburgh Festival Fringe.

== Key people ==
| Ref | Joined | Person | Job Title(s) |
|---|---|---|---|
| | 2003 | Mark Boosey | Site Editor |
| | 2005 | Aaron Brown | Note |
| | 2006 | Ian Dunn (aka Ian Wolf) | Data Specialist |
| | 2009 | Si Hawkins | Regular Columnist |
| | 2023 | Tim Dawson | Editor, BCG pro |

== Podcasts ==
BCG hosts multiple podcasts, some of which have gone on to win awards. As It Occurs to Me was nominated for a Sony Radio Academy Award in 2010, Do the Right Thing won the Bronze Sony Award for "Best Internet Programme" in 2012, Pappy's Flatshare Slamdown won at the 2012 Loaded Lafta Awards for "Best Podcast", and Richard Herring's Leicester Square Theatre Podcast won the Bronze Sony Radio Award for comedy in 2013.

In June 2013, an episode of Richard Herring's Leicester Square Theatre Podcast saw host Richard Herring interviewing Stephen Fry, in which Fry revealed that he had attempted to commit suicide. The story has been reported in the BBC and Sky News.

The podcasts hosted by BCG are:

| Name | Year |
|---|---|
| The Collings and Herrin Podcast | 2008–2011 |
| Richard Herring: As It Occurs to Me | 2009–2011 |
| What Are You Laughing At? | 2011–2014 |
| Richard Herring's Edinburgh Fringe Podcast | 2011–present |
| Me1 vs Me2 Snooker with Richard Herring | 2011–present |
| Pappy's Flatshare Slamdown | 2011–present |
| Do the Right Thing | 2011–2019 |
| Talking Cock with Richard Herring | 2012–2013 |
| Live from Kirrin Island | 2012–2015 |
| Mat Ricardo's London Varieties | 2012–2013 |
| No Pressure to Be Funny | 2011–2015 |
| Richard Herring's Leicester Square Theatre Podcast | 2012–present |
| The John Dredge Nothing to Do with Anything Show | 2013–2020 |
| The Comedian's Comedian with Stuart Goldsmith | 2013–present |
| Richard Herring: We're All Going to Die | 2013 |
| Margaret Thatcher Queen of Podcasts | 2015 |
| Sitcom Geeks | 2015–2023 |
| My Dad Wrote a Porno | 2015–2022 |
| ManBuyCow | 2015–present |
| Richard Herring: Happy Now? | 2016 |
| Isy Suttie's The Things We Do for Love | 2016–present |
| The Adventures of Grett Binchleaf | 2016–present |
| Hayley & Ruth: Two Stars | 2016–present |

== BCG Pro ==
BCG Pro is British Comedy Guide's professional platform, aimed at comedy writers and stand-up comedians. The service offers a wide range of features, opportunities, and development resources, as well as a script consultancy and writers' room experiences.

== See also ==
- Chortle (live comedy in the UK)
