= That Was Then, This Is Now (radio series) =

That Was Then, This Is Now (TWTTIN, /twəˈtʌtɪn/) is a BBC Radio 2 history based comedy sketch show co-written and presented by Richard Herring. The series also featured musical interludes from a live band, fronted by Christian Reilly. The show ran for three series between 2004 and 2008.

Herring was assisted each week by TV's Emma Kennedy, Dan Tetsell and Danny Robins. Tetsell and Robins never appeared as themselves (bar a couple of short segments), but rather as characters in sketches or as special guests. Each show would contain sketches based on historical events, the anniversary of which would be around the date of transmission. A running joke in the second series was that Radio 2 had commissioned it so that the final episodes went out at the same time of year as the first episodes of the first series, meaning that exactly the same anniversaries were coming around as for the first. The earlier part of the series featured a running joke as to whether such a show should acknowledge the anniversary of the September 11 attacks, and debate as to whether ignoring it would be more offensive than not ignoring it.

== Regular Features ==
=== TWTTIN ===
As with This Morning With Richard Not Judy and later, As It Occurs To Me, Herring made the show's title in to an unwieldy acronym, which was repeated by the audience every time it was said.

=== TV's Emma Kennedy's Births, Deaths and Marriages ===
Emma Kennedy's main section in the series looked at births, deaths and marriages from that week in history. These are invariably curtailed by Richard Herring, who would pick holes in Kennedy's jokes before berating her for being mawkish. The section featured the jingle "It's time to find out who got wed, bred or dead, with TV's Emma Kenned... dy". Later in the series, Kennedy tried out various formats, all of which were treated with equal disdain by Herring.

=== What Reaaaallllly Happened ===
Herring looks back at historical events revealing a humorous "truth" about the incident. Herring explains that the word "really" is spelt with four As and five Ls.

=== The Song ===
Each week, as well as providing the stings for the show, halfway through the show Reilly and the band would play a song based on a historical event. Sometimes these were pastiches of well known songs with a link to the event.

=== History Corner ===
In the first series, History Corner was a small library full of history books from which Herring's "time team" would find facts from that week in history. In series one, Tetsell and Robins played recurring characters Mr. Morgan and Brian O'Green, respectively. Mr. Morgan was Richard's old history teacher and through the first series had a breakdown after declaring his marriage a sham and his love for an ex-pupil in the first episode. As the series went along, he turned to alcoholism and used the show to beg forgiveness from his wife Hilary. Mr. Morgan never appeared in the second and third series and was never mentioned again. Potentially he perished in the indoor bonfire and fireworks display which ended the first series, but this has never been confirmed. Brian O'Green (Robins) was an "inter-nerd" Richard knew from the local pub quiz team. His obsessions included Star Trek, the Nazis and conspiracy theories and unlike Mr. Morgan, he featured as a semi-regular character throughout all three series. The name Brian O'Green was also used as a character name in Lionel Nimrod's Inexplicable World.

=== Conspiracy Theory Corner ===
Brian O'Green's semi regular feature in which he reveals his own conspiracy theories to a cynical Herring; all of which are completely nonsensical.

=== The Marriage of Richard Herring and TV's Emma Kennedy ===
During the series, a complex love triangle formed between Herring, Kennedy and Reilly. Herring frequently let slip his affections for Reilly, all of which were firmly rejected. In series two, after finding out the Reilly had married, Herring got engaged to Kennedy for a bet, not realising that due to BBC compliance, all TV and radio marriages had been made legally binding. Despite claiming to hate each other, Kennedy reveals that in fact she loves Herring, who concedes that he loves her too. In the last series, Herring and Kennedy's marriage shows signs of strain when Herring, emulating his hero Henry VIII, orders for Kennedy to be beheaded. However, Kennedy reveals that she is pregnant with Herring's baby and therefore cannot be executed. In the last episode, it is revealed that the baby is in fact Reilly's and the two leave Herring to form a three-way relationship with Reilly's wife, taking all the show's characters with them.

== Cast ==
- Richard Herring
- Emma Kennedy
- Christian Reilly
- Dan Tetsell
- Danny Robins

== Band Names ==
The band went by a different name every week, each based around a historical figure or event and would be introduced and "Christian Reilly and..."

- The Warnings from History
- The Entente Cordiales
- Stalingrad
- The Pretenders to the Throne of King Henry the Seventh
- The Rosetta Stones
- Bubonic Plague
- The Borgias
- The Cato Street Conspirators
- The Pogroms
- Bismarck
- Guillotine
- Enigma Machine
- Schleswig-Holstein
- The Tolpuddle Martyrs
- The Sodomites
- Diplodocus
- The Diet of Worms
- The King Zogs of Albania

== Transmission Dates ==
=== Series 1 ===
Series 1 aired on BBC Radio 2, Saturdays at 1:00pm.

1. Episode 1 - 2 Oct 2004
2. Episode 2 - 9 Oct 2004
3. Episode 3 - 16 Oct 2004
4. Episode 4 - 23 Oct 2004
5. Episode 5 - 30 Oct 2004
6. Episode 6 - 6 Nov 2004

=== Series 2 ===
Series 2 aired on BBC Radio 2, Saturdays at 1:00pm

1. Episode 1 - 2 Sep 2006
2. Episode 2 - 9 Sep 2006
3. Episode 3 - 16 Sep 2006
4. Episode 4 - 23 Sep 2006
5. Episode 5 - 30 Sep 2006
6. Episode 6 - 7 Oct 2006

=== Series 3 ===
Series 3 aired on BBC Radio 2, Thursdays at 11:30pm repeated Saturday 1:30pm

1. Episode 1 - 29 Nov 2007
2. Episode 2 - 6 Dec 2007
3. Episode 3 - 13 Dec 2007
4. Episode 4 - 3 Jan 2008
5. Episode 5 - 10 Jan 2008
6. Episode 6 - 17 Jan 2008
