= Lee and Herring =

1992–2000 British comedy double act

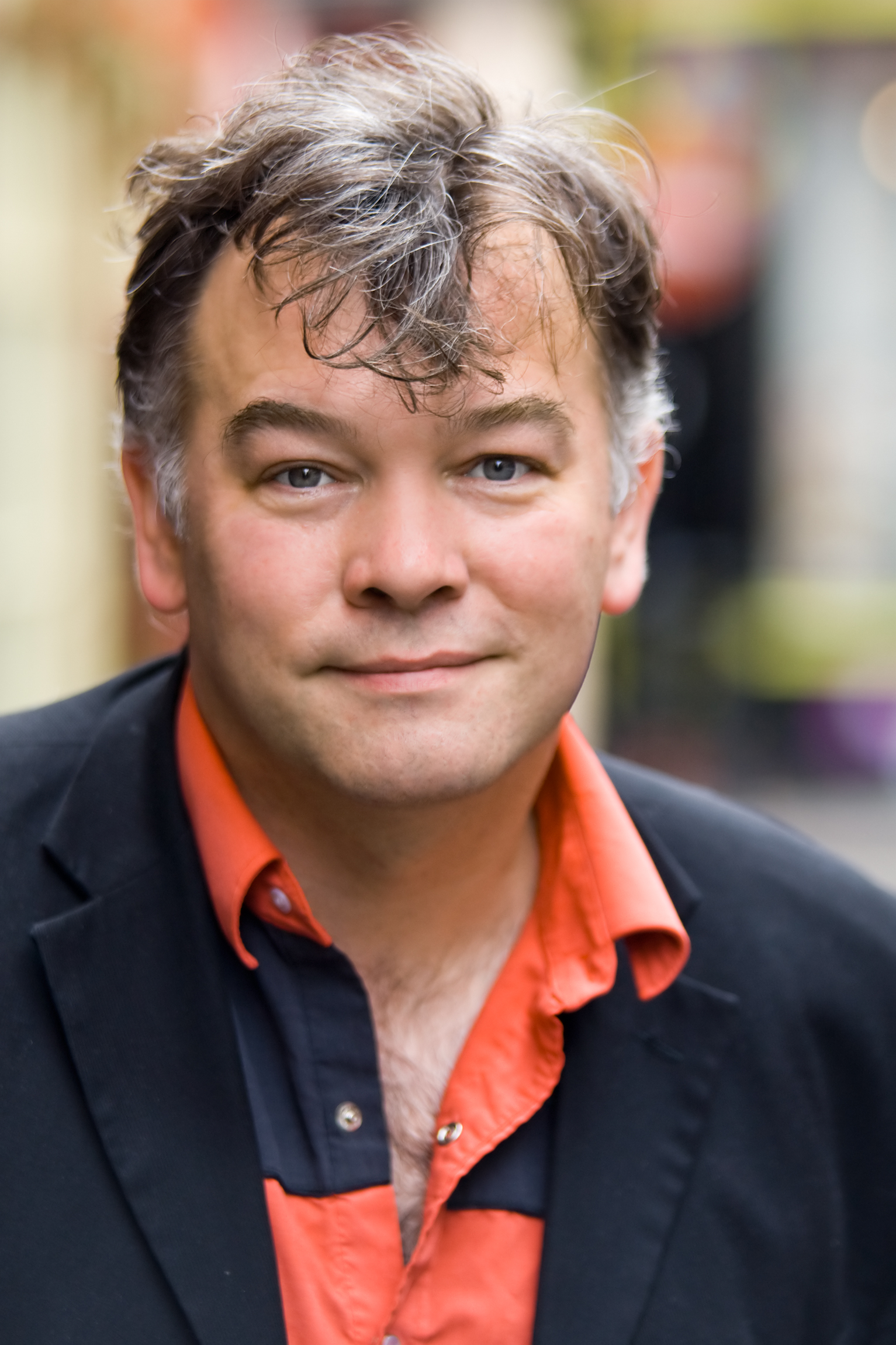

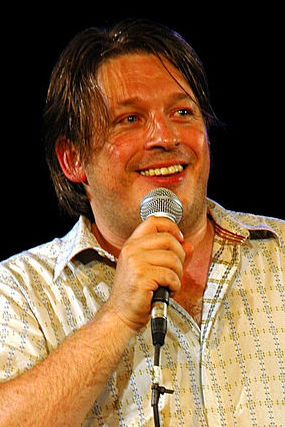
Lee (left, 2008) and Herring (right, 2005)
- Notable work: Fist of Fun; This Morning with Richard Not Judy; Real Time (Doctor Who)

Comedy career
- Years active: 1992–2000
- Medium: Television, radio, stand-up
- Genres: Sketch comedy Black comedy Surreal humour Wit; Satire
- Subjects: British culture Everyday life
- Members: Stewart Lee; Richard Herring

Lee and Herring were a British standup comedy double act consisting of the comedians Stewart Lee and Richard Herring. They were most famous for their work on television, most notably Fist of Fun and This Morning with Richard Not Judy but had been working together on stage and on radio since the late 1980s.

As with many double acts, Lee and Herring performed as contrasting personalities: one mature and sardonic (Lee) and the other puerile and cheeky (Herring). As with several other double acts, Lee and Herring had a certain irony to their style and constantly checked themselves and made reference to this. The characters of Lee and Herring were parodies and exaggerations of their real life selves.

== History ==
Lee and Herring first met at a party while they were studying at the University of Oxford. Lee had been performing stand-up on the circuit for a short while and had heard that Herring had been trying to as well, so he introduced himself. Lee once remarked that one of the reasons they decided to work as a double act was that they found the resemblance of the title "Lee and Herring" to Worcestershire sauce brand Lea & Perrins humorous.

At Oxford, Lee and Herring performed in a regular comedy revue called The Seven Raymonds, which also included the material and performance of Emma Kennedy, Michael Cosgrave and Tim Richardson.

Together they wrote material for Chris Morris' On The Hour (1991). However, a management conflict meant that the duo were not involved in the television version, The Day Today, and that their material was edited out of the original official BBC audio releases of On The Hour (it was later re-instated in a 2009 CD release on Warp Records).

In 1992 and 1993, they were introduced to producer Sarah Smith and wrote and performed Lionel Nimrod's Inexplicable World for BBC Radio 4. For BBC Radio 1, they wrote and performed one series of Fist of Fun (1993), which later transferred to television and would pave the way for their mainstream success. Fist of Fun made several subtle references to their dislike for former colleague Patrick Marber. Lee and Herring fell out with the On The Hour team after a row over ownership of characters; Patrick Marber has claimed that he invented the character of news reporter Peter O'Hanraha-hanrahan, while Lee and Herring also claim to have invented the character.

After the radio version of Fist of Fun, they presented another Radio 1 show running for 3 series, simply entitled Lee and Herring (but often referred to as Lee & Herring's Radio One Music Show) which featured a mixture of records chosen by the duo themselves, and their comedy sketches and discussions.

Their final major work as a double-act was This Morning With Richard Not Judy (TMWRNJ), which aired on Sunday mornings on BBC Two for series in 1998 and 1999.

== Break-up ==
Lee and Herring went their separate ways at the end of the 1990s. Stewart Lee retired from stand-up comedy in the early 2000s, a time in which he co-wrote Jerry Springer – The Opera and directed Attention Scum! for Simon Munnery. He made a comeback to stand-up in 2005, touring shows, and has written and performed four series of his own BBC Two television show Stewart Lee's Comedy Vehicle. In 2018, he was named the best current English-language comedian in the world by The Times.

Richard Herring went on to write the sitcoms Time Gentlemen Please for Sky One with Al Murray, and You Can Choose Your Friends (which was loosely based on his own family) for ITV, and worked on the third series of Little Britain as script editor. Herring has written, performed and toured with a number of successful comedy shows including Christ on a Bike, Hitler Moustache and We're All Going To Die, building up an audience through the medium of podcasts which include Collings and Herrin with Andrew Collins and his interview show Richard Herring's Leicester Square Theatre Podcast. By 2025 he had performed in 27 editions of the Edinburgh Festival Fringe, in a total of 44 shows.

== Reunions ==
Lee and Herring remain friends in real life, and occasionally reunite for one-off events. Collaborations include an interview together for The Guardian and a 2005 review of each other's work for the arts supplement of The Sunday Times.

The pair performed a short set at London's Bloomsbury Theatre on 5 February 2007 as part of a tribute to stand-up comedian Ted Chippington.

They reunited for a 30-minute performance at the Lyric Theatre in Hammersmith on 16 November 2008, where they were joined at the end by a resurrected "Curious Orange".

A brief reunion took place at the 2010 Edinburgh Fringe at Stewart Lee's Silver Stewbilee show in which Herring heckled him and ran on stage, berating him for his "pretentious" new book. Lee also "appeared" as a recorded voicemail message on The Collings and Herrin Podcast Live the following day.

Herring interviewed Lee in June 2012 on his series Richard Herring's Leicester Square Theatre Podcast. The filmed version of this encounter has both an individual release by indie company Go Faster Stripe, and acts as extra material on the Series Two Fist of Fun box set. Other podcast appearances between the two include Richard Herring's Edinburgh Fringe Podcast in August 2013 and again for the sixth season of Richard Herring's Leicester Square Theatre Podcast in 2015.

On 2 June 2014, Lee and Herring briefly appeared on stage together when Lee introduced Herring's section at a British Humanist Association benefit.

== Works ==
=== Live ===
- Lionel Nimrod's Inexplicable World - LIVE!
- This Morning With Richard Not Judy (1994)
- Lee and Herring Live off of TV's Fist of Fun (1995)
- Lee & Herring Live (1996)
- This Morning With Richard Not Judy II (1997)
- Lee and Herring (1998)

=== Radio ===
- The End of the Roadshow (1992)
- On the Hour (1991–92)
- Lionel Nimrod's Inexplicable World (1992–93)
- Fist of Fun (1993)
- Lee and Herring (Lee & Herring's Radio One Music Show) (1994–95)

=== Television ===
- Fist of Fun (1995–96)
- Festival of Fun (1995)
- Lee & Herring's Reasonably Scary Monsters (1998)
- This Morning With Richard Not Judy (1998–99)

=== Books ===
- Lee & Herring's Fist of Fun (1995) BBC Books
