= Home from Home =

Home from Home may refer to:

- Home from Home (album), by Millencolin
- Home from Home (1939 film), a 1939 British film
- Home from Home (2013 film), a 2013 German film
- Home from Home (2001 TV series), a Channel 4 series
- Home from Home (2016 TV series), a BBC sitcom
