= Elastic Planet =

English radio series

Elastic Planet is a six-part radio comedy series, first broadcast on BBC Radio 4 in 1995, taking the form of a surreal documentary reminiscent of Connections. It was written by Ben Moor, narrated by Oliver Postgate and produced by Jon Naismith.

The series deals with subjects such as the decline of the British dust industry, bad spelling rings and cheese sculpture.

The series has been repeated on BBC 7 and BBC Radio 4 Extra on various occasions.

== Cast ==
Various roles in the show are taken on by the cast members Kerry Shale, and Michael Troughton. Others appearing included Neil Mullarkey, Geoffrey McGivern, Miriam Margolyes, Rebecca Front, Fiona Allen, Doon Mackichan and Alexander Armstrong

== Episode guide ==
1. The Babies
2. The Train
3. The Shape
4. The Zoo
5. The Objects
6. The Travel
