= Tim Richardson (writer) =

British food writer

Tim Richardson, author of Sweets: The History of Temptation, is the world's first international confectionery historian. He also writes about gardens, landscape and theatre, and contributes to the Daily Telegraph, Country Life, The Idler, House & Garden, Garden Design Journal and Wallpaper. He has also written of several books on landscape design.

He lives in North London. In 2012, Richardson founded The Chelsea Fringe (chelseafringe.com) to celebrate the more quirky horticulture that did not quite make the Chelsea Flower Show. It takes place each year during the fortnight around the Chelsea Flower Show.

Richardson wrote and performed comedy at Oxford University in the 1980s in a revue group called The Seven Raymonds with Stewart Lee, Richard Herring, Emma Kennedy, and Michael Cosgrave.

== Bibliography ==
- Richardson, Tim, ed. (2000). The Garden Book. London: Phaidon.
- The Arcadian Friends: Inventing the English Landscape Garden (2007)
- Avant Gardeners: 50 Visionaries of the Contemporary Landscape (2008)
- Goodall, John; Richardson, Tim (10 September 2014). "Fulham : a brief guide". Country Life. 208 (37): 104–108.
- Oxford College Gardens (2018)
