= Undone (radio series) =

BBC radio comedy

- Genre: Comedy
- Running time: 30 minutes
- Country of origin: United Kingdom
- Language: English
- Home station: BBC Radio 7
- Starring: Sarah Solemani (Series 1); Alex Tregear (Series 2-3); Ben Moor; Duncan Wisbey
- Written by: Ben Moor
- Produced by: Colin Anderson
- Original release: 25 March 2006 – 2 January 2010
- No. of series: 3 + 1 pilot
- No. of episodes: 17
- Audio format: Stereophonic sound
- Opening theme: "We Are The Sleepyheads" by Belle & Sebastian

Undone is a radio comedy broadcast by the BBC on the digital channel BBC 7, written by and starring Ben Moor. It uses a sci-fi theme of parallel universes to poke fun at life and especially the media business in London. The series focuses on the life of Edna Turner (Sarah Solemani in Series One and Alex Tregear in Series Two and Three), a journalist for a listings magazine who discovers a weird parallel version of London called "Undone".

The pilot episode (also known as "Mind the Gaps", and first broadcast in March 2006) was subsequently designated Episode One of the first season. That first season was broadcast on consecutive evenings in October 2006. In November 2007, it was rebroadcast over five weeks. BBC7 broadcast a second series of six weekly episodes, beginning Sunday 20 January 2008. A third series was broadcast starting on 28 November 2009, making Undone BBC Radio 7's longest-running original narrative comedy, that is one not previously broadcast on any other BBC network.

== Plot ==
Would-be journalist Edna Turner comes to London to work on the listings magazine Get Out!, a parody of Time Out. She encounters Tankerton Slopes (Ben Moor), who works in a parallel version of London called Undone. They have something in common, in that they both work for the same boss, Carlo Jones, although Tankerton's boss is a parallel version of Edna's. Tankerton recruits Edna to help find residents of Undone who have crossed to London. Tankerton is somewhat taken with the fact that Edna comes from the town of Towcester, as its name is pronounced in the same way as the common kitchen appliance. Naturally, he buys her a toaster from Undone as a gift.

Undone is "where the weirdness comes from". Ideas leak from Undone to London, making it the peculiar place it is. However, according to Tankerton, reality "cannot stand too much weirdness". There are "gaps" here and there that connect London and Undone. People like Tankerton and Edna can learn to find the gaps. Others sometimes cross over to make a new career in London, but inevitably upset the balance between the worlds. Tankerton sends Edna to check out unusual events and places that may be the result of people crossing over. Edna, however, cannot resist letting the dishy Grant (Tim Key) from Undone stay in her London, piling up problems for the final episode, while Edna's mother descends from their home in Towcester to visit Edna and her old friend Carlo, in Undone.

In the first series finale, weirdness threatens to flood London while mundaneness threatens Undone. Edna discovers that she is the one who can maintain the balance between realities. In the process, she perceives even more universes, including one in which she is "a fictional character played by Sarah Solemani". She restores the balance, but Tankerton and other Undoners she has come to know vanish, and the gaps between London and Undone are closed. Returning to her flat, she wonders if she imagined everything, but sees the gifts Tankerton gave her, and discovers she can cross to Undone simply by concentrating.

In the second series, Edna learns that Tankerton has become engaged to a woman called Ida (Sophie Duval) who lives in another version of London called Donlon, which is very generic. She also learns that they are half-sisters and their father is The Prince (Kevin Eldon), a man who wants to unite all versions of London together and thus is an enemy of Tankerton.

In the third series, Edna meets the "real" Tankerton Slopes, and journeys to the "Prime" version of London, along with other cities such as Roman Londinium, "Londres" (a French version), and "Lahndan", a vibrantly Cockney version. A character called "Golfer Mackenzie" gathers together all his alternate selves from the different Londons and rampages across reality. One of the Golfer Mackenzies, who comes from a version of London where everyone is angry, kills the Undone version of Carlo. Edna comes to realize that all the Londons are her creation, and she has to learn to sort them out before they all destroy each other. At the end, she has restored a London that includes her, Ida, Tankerton (as Tim Stokes), the London Carlo, and other important people. Everything seems stable until she receives a phone call from Golfer.

== Episodes ==
=== Series overview ===
Season	Episodes	Originally released	
Season	Episodes	First released	Last released
Pilot		26 March 2006	
1	4	3 October 2006	6 October 2006
2	6	20 January 2008	25 February 2008
3	6	28 November 2009	2 January 2010

=== Pilot (2006) ===
No.	Title	Produced by	Original release date
1	"Mind the Gaps" "Undone"	Colin Anderson	26 March 2006

=== Series 1 (2006) ===
No. overall	No. in series	Title	Produced by	Original release date
2	1	"Unappreciated"	Colin Anderson	3 October 2006
3	2	"Unrivalled"	Colin Anderson	4 October 2006
4	3	"Unfamiliar"	Colin Anderson	5 October 2006
5	4	"Unravelled"	Colin Anderson	6 October 2006

=== Series 2 (2008) ===
No. overall	No. in series	Title	Produced by	Original release date
6	1	"Unaccompanied"	Colin Anderson	20 January 2008
7	2	"Unsurprised"	Colin Anderson	27 January 2008
8	3	"Unrelated"	Colin Anderson	3 February 2008
9	4	"Unaccustomed"	Colin Anderson	10 February 2008
10	5	"Unwelcome"	Colin Anderson	17 February 2008
11	6	"Unification"	Colin Anderson	24 February 2008

=== Series 3 (2009–10) ===
No. overall	No. in series	Title	Produced by	Original release date
12	1	"Unalike"	Colin Anderson & Lyndsay Fenner	28 November 2009
13	2	"Untoward"	Colin Anderson & Lyndsay Fenner	5 December 2009
14	3	"Ungainly"	Colin Anderson & Lyndsay Fenner	12 December 2009
15	4	"Underground"	Colin Anderson & Lyndsay Fenner	19 December 2009
16	5	"United"	Colin Anderson & Lyndsay Fenner	26 December 2009
17	6	"Unending"	Colin Anderson & Lyndsay Fenner	2 January 2010

== Characters ==
- Edna Turner (Sarah Solemani in Series 1, Alex Tregear in Series 2 and 3), a neophyte journalist. After meeting the Prince, Edna is not sure whether to continue believing in Tankerton's work, or the Prince's own plans. As the story progresses, she becomes uncomfortably aware of her increasing number of abilities, including the trick of switching to a new reality when the current one becomes too boring.
- Tankerton Slopes (Ben Moor), a man who patrols the gaps between the worlds and returns errant Undoners home. He plans to marry Edna's half-sister Ida who lives in the duller parallel world of Donlon. Tankerton initially presents himself as coming from Undone, but in the second series he reveals that his real name is Tim Stokes and he comes from Edna's universe. At the end of series three, we learn that there is an Undone version of Tankerton, who was the version Ida meant to marry. The name "Tankerton Slopes" is actually that of a geographical feature near the town of Whitstable.
- Carlo Jones (Duncan Wisbey). In London, he is Edna's slightly vague boss who knows more about what's really going on than he would like. In Undone, he is Tankerton's take-charge boss who may be working for the Prince. There is also a counterpart in Donlon, called "Charles Jones", also played by Wisbey. In the first two series, the London Carlo is in charge of a listings magazine called Get Out!, which folds at the end of series two. At the beginning of series three, it becomes a weekly email called Go On!, formed with the help of Ida. Midway through series three, the Undone version of Carlo is killed.
- The Prince, or the Man Man, (Kevin Eldon), Edna and Ida's father, who wants to unite all the parallel Londons. He has been tossed out of an organization known as "The Court" for his attempts to do this. He knows about "The Gem", a jewel which has power over the realities, and which has been broken into pieces. This may have been done to prevent him joining all the worlds, or it may have been done by him to stop the Court from acting. Edna thinks she knows where at least three of the five pieces are.
- Billy O'Malley (Duncan Wisbey), a stereotypical Irishman who technically looks after the flats where Edna lives, but usually pleads back trouble when called upon to do any work. He works part-time for the Prince in getting Undoners into London, operating the "Anomaly Project" (i.e. "An O'Malley Project") from his flat.
- Ida (Sophie Duval), Edna's half-sister in the mundane world of Donlon. In Donlon everything is generic, including names, so she comes from "a small town, called 'Smalltown'." She and Tankerton plan to get married, presumably in a church called "Church". According to the Prince, Edna and Ida played together as children, but Edna is not sure if she believes this.
- Grant (Tim Key), an Undoner with the best eyes Edna has ever seen and a talent for drawing, especially drawing veils over activities he and Edna would prefer were private. He develops bizarre theatre projects, and also runs "We Will Hide Your Stuff", a company which hides things from people so they can experience the joy of finding them again. He disappears when Edna, using "Undone logic" convinces him that he should have hidden himself as part of the scheme.
- Kate (Montserrat Lombard, series 1 & 2, Daisy Haggard, series 3), another journalist competing with Edna, who prefers dull, unimaginative things. She moves to Donlon where she is much happier.
- Rosie Turner (Emma Kennedy), Edna's mother who knows about Undone, Donlon, Carlo and the Prince, as well as about Ida and Ida's mother in Smalltown, who is also called Rosie.
- Faceless Bureaucrats (Kevin Eldon, Jot Davies and others), Undoners who live up to their name (which makes some aspects of life difficult, since they lack eyes, noses and mouths). They plot to make large parts of London disappear from the map, which is eventually revealed as part of the Prince's plot to create a "mega-gap". They are expert at "Undone logic" but can be tortured with celebrity gossip rumours. They also meet their match in the "National Indecisiveness Society or Association (or Federation)" and its uncertain founder.
- Marlboro Fagpacket (Dan Antopolski), an Undoner who appears in the first episode, bringing bizarre ideas for TV shows to London, such as "Molotov Cocktail Party", a review of riots around the world.
