= Andrew Collins (broadcaster) =

English writer and broadcaster

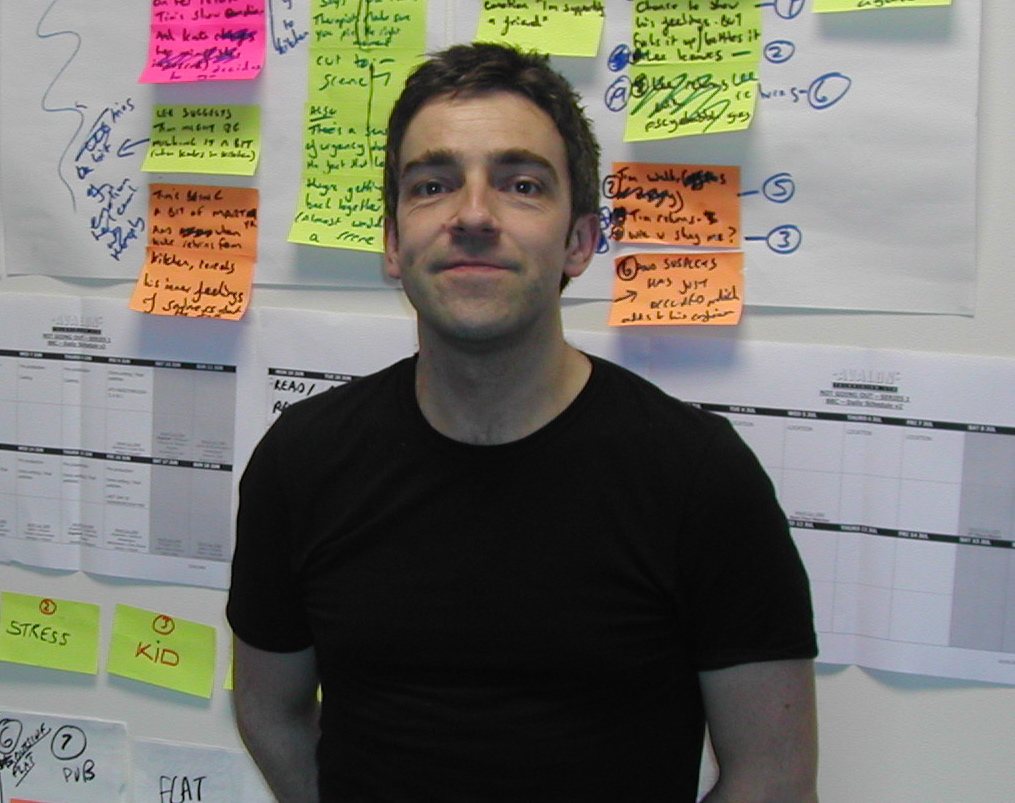
- Born: Andrew John Collins; 4 March 1965 (age 61); Northampton, England
- Occupations: Journalist; scriptwriter; critic; broadcaster
- Spouse: Julie Quirke (m. 1994)
- Website: wherediditallgorightblog.wordpress.com

Andrew Collins is an English writer and broadcaster. He is the creator and writer of the Radio 4 sitcom Mr Blue Sky. His writing for television includes the soap opera EastEnders and the sitcoms Grass (which he co-wrote with Simon Day) and Not Going Out (which he initially co-wrote with Lee Mack). Collins has also worked as a music, television and film critic.

== Early life ==
Collins was educated at Abington Vale Primary and Middle School and Weston Favell Upper School. He passed A-levels in English and Art and gained a place at Nene College (now the University of Northampton) for a one-year art foundation course. He subsequently attended Chelsea School of Art, where he studied graphic design and illustration for three years.

== Career ==
Collins started his career as a music journalist, writing for the NME, Vox, Select and Q (where was editor, 1995–97). He also wrote for and edited film magazine Empire in 1995. He formed a double-act with fellow music journalist Stuart Maconie, presenting the Sony Award-winning BBC Radio 1 show Collins and Maconie's Hit Parade, after forging their style on a daily comedy strand on Mark Goodier's BBC Radio 1 drivetime show, and Collins & Maconie's Movie Club on ITV.

In 1998, Collins published his first book, Still Suitable for Miners, an authorised biography of the singer-songwriter Billy Bragg. The book was updated, in 2002, 2007, 2013 and 2018.

Collins appeared on BBC, ITV and Channel 4 list shows, including I Love the '80s programme. He stated on BBC Three's The Most Annoying TV Programmes We Love to Hate that he had appeared on 37 such list show. He devoted a full chapter to the experience of appearing as a talking head on such shows in his third volume of autobiography, That's Me in the Corner, and continues to appear on similar shows (most recently, The Comedy Years on ITV in May 2019).

Collins has written three volumes of autobiography, humorous accounts of "growing up normal" in 1970s Northampton, struggling with art school in London in the 1980s, and forging a media career in the 1980s and 1990s: Where Did It All Go Right? (2003) (a Sunday Times and WHSmith bestseller), Heaven Knows I'm Miserable Now (2004) and That's Me in the Corner (which draws its title from a line from the R.E.M. song "Losing My Religion") published in May 2007.

Collins produced a regular (generally weekly) podcast, the Collings & Herrin Podcast, with comedian Richard Herring, which began in February 2008, ran for four years and was named "Podcast of the Week" in The Times in July 2008. Some episodes were recorded in front of a live audience. A hiatus from June 2011 to 4 November 2011 was due to what Herring joked was "Collins' duplicitous careerism". Herring announced that the November 2011 podcast would most likely be the last, as Collins had lost enthusiasm for it.

Collins presented solo shows on BBC Radio 6 Music as well as presenting shows with Richard Herring before and during their podcast series. Collins then presented a Saturday morning radio show with Josie Long on BBC Radio 6 Music between July and December 2011.

In 2010, Collins made a brief foray into standup comedy, performing a show at the Edinburgh Fringe called Secret Dancing... and other urban survival techniques. This was recorded and released on DVD.

Collins co-wrote the first series of the sitcom Not Going Out for BBC One with Lee Mack, and co-wrote various episodes for the second, third and fourth series. The fifth was the first series he did not work on. The first series won the Rose D'Or for Best Comedy, and he and Mack won the RTS Breakthrough award.

Collins worked on the team-written sitcom Gates for Sky Living in 2012, and re-teamed with Simon Day (with whom he'd co-written Grass for BBC Three and BBC2 in 2003) to co-write Colin, an episode of the anthology series Common Ground on Sky Atlantic in 2013.

Collins was script editor on sitcoms The Persuasionists on BBC Two, Little Crackers (specifically Shappi Khorsandi's) on Sky1, the broadcast pilot of Man Down on Channel 4 (2013), two series of Badults on BBC Three (2013–2014), and the second series of Drifters for E4.

In 2014, Collins acted as a script consultant on The Inbetweeners 2.

Collins was the film editor for Radio Times from 2000 until 2021. He wrote and filmed a weekly TV review column, Telly Addict, for The Guardian website, from May 2011 to April 2016. It returned in June 2016 on YouTube, now hosted and produced by UKTV.

Collins took over the weekly radio show Saturday Night at the Movies on classical music station Classic FM in March 2015 (from presenter and composer Howard Goodall). In March 2023, Jonathan Ross replaced Collins as presenter.

== Mr Blue Sky ==
Collins' first solo-written comedy, Mr Blue Sky for BBC Radio 4, starred Mark Benton and Rebecca Front and aired in May and June 2011. It was recommissioned for a second series in 2012. It focused on Harvey Easter (Benton), an eternally optimistic man in his 40s and his more realistic wife Jax (played in series two by Claire Skinner), and the rest of the family including son Robbie, daughter Charlie and grandmother Lou. Jim Bob of indie duo Carter the Unstoppable Sex Machine recorded a cover of "Mr. Blue Sky" by Electric Light Orchestra for the theme tune.

Radio critic Miranda Sawyer in The Observer praised Benton's "lovely" performance and said "this series charms." The List gave it 3/5, calling it "warmly cosy." The Guardian found it "full of warm, nicely observed lines." After its second series aired in April and May 2012 (Moira Petty in The Stage praised Benton's performance as "an essay in finely nuanced felicity"), Mr. Blue Sky was not recommissioned for a third series.

== Personal life ==
Collins was a member of the Labour Party between the late 1980s and early 1990s, leaving after its defeat in the 1992 general election. In 2007, he was made patron of Thomas's Fund, a Northampton-based music therapy charity for children with life-limiting illnesses.

== Books ==
- Still Suitable for Miners: Billy Bragg: The Authorised Biography (1998, 2002, 2007, 2013, 2018 rev. ed.), Virgin Books ISBN 075355271X
- Friends Reunited: Remarkable Real Life Stories from the Nation's Favourite Website (2003), Virgin Books ISBN 1-85227-039-X (ed.)
- Where Did It All Go Right?: Growing Up Normal in the 70s (2003), Ebury Press ISBN 0-09-188667-8
- Heaven Knows I'm Miserable Now: My Difficult Student 80s (2004), Ebury Press ISBN 0-09-189691-6
- That's Me in the Corner: Adventures of an Ordinary Boy in a Celebrity World (2007) Ebury Press ISBN 0-09-189786-6
- Dads (2008), Contributor, (Edited by Sarah Brown and Gil McNeil) Ebury Press ISBN 0091922720 ISBN 978-0091922726
- Shouting at the Telly (2009), Contributor, (Edited by John Grindrod) Faber and Faber ISBN 0-571-24802-0 ISBN 978-0571248025
- Modern Delight (2009), Contributor, Faber and Faber ISBN 0571251250 ISBN 978-0571251254
- Grandparents: A Celebration (2009), Contributor, (Edited by Sarah Brown and Gil McNeil) Ebury Press ISBN 0091930782 ISBN 978-0091930783
- End of a Century: Nineties Album Reviews in Pictures (2015), Editor, SelfMadeHero ISBN 190683895X ISBN 978-1906838959
- Gogglebook: The Wit and Wisdom of Gogglebox (2015), Macmillan Books ISBN 1509809309 ISBN 978-1509809301
