= Ben Moor (writer) =

English comedy writer and actor

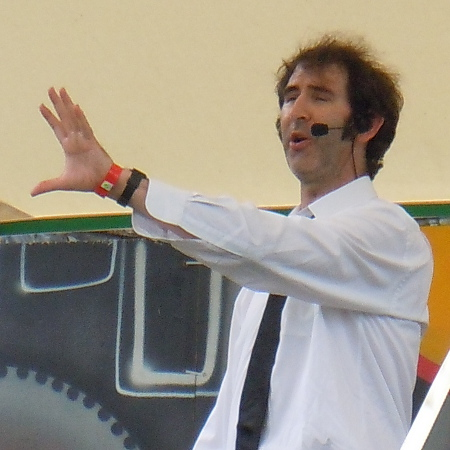
- Moor in 2012
- Born: 8 February 1969 (age 57); Wimbledon, London, England
- Occupations: Actor, writer

Benedict Moor (born 8 February 1969) is an English comedy writer and actor.

== Early life ==
Moor was born in Wimbledon and grew up in Whitstable, Kent. He read history at University College, Oxford and graduated in 1990. While at university joined The Oxford Revue after watching the Seven Raymonds perform and first met Richard Herring, Stewart Lee and Al Murray, with whom he later collaborated.

== Career ==
Moving to London, Moor wrote sketches for Week Ending and Spitting Image and developed his own work. In 1995 he created Elastic Planet for BBC Radio 4 which populated surreal storytelling with real world personalities such as Patrick Moore and Raymond Baxter. It was narrated by Oliver Postgate.

Moor's television credits include a clown in Knowing Me, Knowing You... with Alan Partridge, a quiz participant in Time Gentlemen Please and various roles in Fist of Fun and ITV's Planet Mirth. In cinema, he played the part of Andolini in Lasse Hallström's 2005 movie, Casanova.

In 2000, Moor played Lord John Dervis in the Bristol Old Vic and West End production of A Busy Day by Fanny Burney. His one-man shows include A Supercollider for the Family, Poppy Day and My Last Week With Modolia.

In 2001 Moor wrote and performed in Three Wishes with Janice Phayre, directed, as many of his shows have been, by Erica Whyman. In 2004 he adapted Black Cocktail, a novella by Jonathan Carroll, and performed it at the Edinburgh Fringe. His play Coelacanth, adapted from the stage one-man show performed at the Edinburgh Fringe of 2005, was broadcast on BBC Radio 4 in October 2006.

Between 2006 and 2009 he created for BBC Radio 7 three series of Undone, a sci-fi comedy in which he also played the role of Tankerton Slopes. He also appeared in and wrote for the BBC Radio 4 sketch show Laura Solon: Talking and Not Talking.

Moor's journalism work has appeared in newspapers and magazines such as The Guardian, The Observer and The Idler.

In 2009, Portobello Books published More Trees to Climb, a book collecting three of Moor's one man shows; Coelacanth, Not Everything Is Significant and A Supercollider for the Family. They are presented in prose as three separate short stories.

In June 2021, he appeared in an episode of the BBC soap opera Doctors as Paul Brooks.
