= Me1 vs Me2 Snooker with Richard Herring =

Comedy podcast about snooker

Cast and voices
- Hosted by: Richard Herring

Publication
- No. of episodes: 168
- Original release: 2011

Me1 vs Me2 Snooker with Richard Herring is the world's longest running snooker podcast, presented by stand-up comedian Richard Herring. First published in December 2011 it peaked at number one in the iTunes charts of the same month. In each podcast Richard Herring performs against himself in a game of snooker (typically in the guise of the titular sportsmen Me1 and Me2).

It is not only notable for being the only audio podcast (to date) which actually incorporates the game of snooker within it, but for the subtext of a man satirising mental health issues and "fighting against a tide of mediocrity and repetition, struggling to create a brave, new and original vision." As of 14 September 2023, 168 frames have been played for the podcast - with the scores, amazingly, sitting at 80-80.

== Origins ==
Richard Herring had found success with other podcasts such as the award-winning Collings and Herrin which had made a successful transition to BBC Radio 6 Music in 2010. His move into snooker podcasting originated through tweeting a live commentary of a game of snooker he played against himself backstage at a comedy club, what started as a joke became something more serious. Herring stated "I attempt to antagonise and lose listeners by commentating on myself playing snooker against myself in my basement. Most people are baffled, confused, even angry about it. But 5,000 people around the world tune in to find out which me will win this week's frame."

== Filmed and live performances ==
Filmed versions of the snooker podcast act as bonus features for Herring's stand-up DVDs What Is Love Anyway (2012) and Talking Cock (2013), which both feature special cup performances. August 2013 saw the first ever frame of Me1 vs Me2 Snooker to be played in front of a live paying audience at the Edinburgh Fringe Festival. In 2016 a five frame match was filmed and performed at the Tempting Failure Festival dedicated to transgressive art. On 4 December 2019 a live performance was given in front of an audience (and filmed for the Kickstarter) for the 2019 Chris Evans (not that one) Trophy at the Cockpit Theatre in London.

In July 2020, a special filmed performance was broadcast on BBC Two. Since Frame 103 in August 2020 – when the podcast returned from a hiatus of several months during the COVID-19 lockdown – matches have been live-streamed on the video streaming service Twitch and subsequently made available on-demand via Herring's Twitch and YouTube channels. The traditional audio-only versions continue to be released as the podcast. During this time, the format has expanded further to include occasional knockout tournaments and leagues featuring matches between other numbered versions of Herring besides the familiar Me1 and Me2, each with their own personalities and characteristics.

== Media coverage ==
In July 2013 the Huffington Post described the podcast as being "representative of the diversity of podcasting." Time Out pre-emptively described the event as one of the top ten Edinburgh Fringe comedy highlights of 2013 stating that listeners "will either have to giggle away at the ridiculous concept, or become deeply irritated." In April 2014 Helen Zaltzman and Olly Mann interviewed Herring about the podcast on BBC Radio 4, which premiered clips of self-playing snooker on the radio of the first time. In the same month The Telegraph included Me1 vs Me2 Snooker in its list of top podcasts describing it as a "wonderfully oddball, regularly hilarious series - in which Herring splits into two versions of himself… other over a long drawn-out game of snooker".
