= Moritz Jagendorf =

American writer (1888–1981)

Moritz Adolph Jagendorf (August 24, 1888 – January 8, 1981) was an Austrian-American folklore author.

== Early life and education ==
Jagendorf was born in Czernowitz, Austria-Hungary. He moved to New York City around the age of 15. He earned his doctoral dental studies degree in 1916 from Columbia University. He helped revitalize the Pi Lambda Phi fraternity by founding the NY Alpha chapter.

== Career ==
While practicing as a dentist, Jagendorf's interests remained in the folklore of Europe, Asia, and the United States. He wrote several stories for children based on folktales he had heard from these various cultures.

He was a noted anarchist. He wrote for Hippolyte Havel's Revolt and co-edited The Road to Freedom with Harry Kelly. In an interview in 1978 he said, "The only progress is in the individual, in you yourself; and through progress you better the whole world. And that is as far as you can go. I said that in 1914 to Leonard Abbott and again in the 1920s and 1930s, and I still say it today."

He was the founder of the Free Theatre, and was director of the Children's Playhouse, and was active in the following organizations: Mohegan Colony Association, Story League, Green Room Club, The International Composers' Guild (he was Edgard Varèse's dentist), Overseas Press and the New York Folktale Society.

He also wrote a book on making wines and other beverages: Folk Wines, Cordials & Brandies: How to Make Them, Along with the Pleasures of Their Lore (Vanguard Pr, 6/1/1963, ISBN 978-0-8149-0125-0 ISBN 0814901255)

He was mentioned at the end of S01E06 (originally broadcast 22 March 1998) of the British comedy series This Morning With Richard Not Judy in an installment of the running joke Men of Achievement 1974.
