= Abington Vale =

Coordinates: 52.24°N 00.85°W

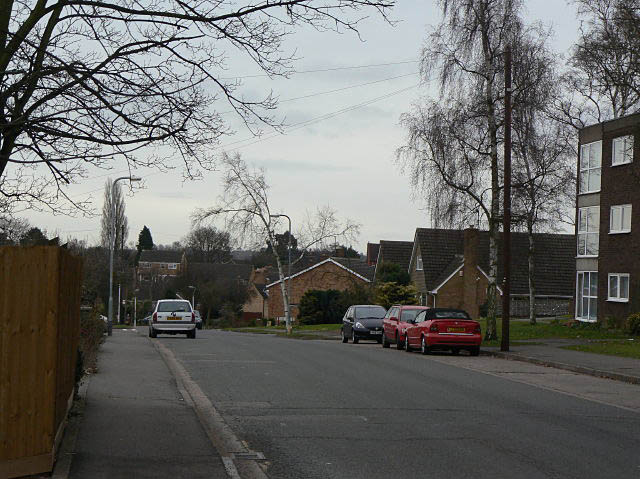

- Location within Northamptonshire
- OS grid reference: SP783609
- Unitary authority: West Northamptonshire
- Ceremonial county: Northamptonshire
- Region: East Midlands
- Country: England
- Sovereign state: United Kingdom
- Post town: NORTHAMPTON
- Postcode district: NN3
- Police: Northamptonshire
- Fire: Northamptonshire
- Ambulance: East Midlands

Abington Vale is an area of Northampton in Northamptonshire, England. Abington Vale lies just to the north of the A45 road and the River Nene; Abington Vale is about 2 miles (3.2 km) north-east from the centre of Northampton.

To the south of Abington Vale is the Nene Valley Gravel Pits which is a Site of Special Scientific Interest (SSSI) as well as being a Special Protection Area. To the east is Billing Aquadrome.There was an old school called Abington vale middle school nearby that opened in 1970. It closed in 2006 for an unknown reason.
