= Home from Home (2001 TV series) =

Home from Home is a British TV series that was shown on Channel 4 from 2001 to 2004. The show was a travel documentary based on two families home swapping for vacation.The show's narrator was Emma Kennedy.
