= Talking Cock (comedy show) =

Stand-up comedy show by Richard Herring

- Original Talking Cock show poster (depicting the Cerne Abbas Giant) from 2002 Edinburgh Festival Fringe.
- Genre: Comedy, stand-up comedy
- Location: United Kingdom; Europe; Australia

Creative team
- Richard Herring

Talking Cock is comedian Richard Herring's fourth unique stand-up comedy show (2002–03, 2012–13), as well as a book (2003), DVD (French - 2004, English - 2013) and podcast (2013) of the same name. It is intended to be a sensitive and provocative body of work about men and women's relationship with the penis throughout the world and over time. The Guardian described Herring's 2002 show as "Man's answer to the Vagina Monologues." Kate Copstick, wrote in The Scotsman "his Cock is as funny and fascinating for women as it is for men. I loved it. I only wished it could have been longer."

== Stand up show ==
UK

Herring decided to write and perform a show with a serious take on the penis in October 2001 whilst performing his previous show Christ on a Bike at the Arts Theatre in London's West End. He was sharing the stage with the worldwide success The Vagina Monologues and after seeing this show Herring wanted to prove that the penis, like the vagina, was worth celebrating rather than being purely an object of ridicule or fear. Having settled on the idea he brought the show to the Edinburgh Fringe Festival in 2002. Herring continued to tour the show along with his book in 2003. In 2012 he brought the show back to the Edinburgh Fringe Festival for Talking Cock: The Second Coming, before touring the UK throughout the rest of the year and half of 2013. In April 2013 he recorded the set for DVD at the Bloomsbury Theatre in London released in August 2013.

Australia

The show was brought to the Melbourne Comedy Festival in 2003 but found little success. Herring noted that the flyers for the show (dressed as packaged condoms) were more of a hit than the show they were promoting.

Norway

Herring sold the rights for the show to be performed abroad and translated into other languages. In Oslo the show was titled "Prik Preik" which translates as "Prick Gossip" or roughly "Bullshit". It was performed by Nils Ole Oftebro, a classical actor famous for performing the plays of Henrik Ibsen.

Finland

The Finnish show was performed in Kotka, titled "Kikkelikiekuu" and was performed by Antti Leskinen.

Belgium

In Antwerp "De Penis Praat" was performed by Erik Goris. This version retained very little of the original material adding pastiches of popular songs. Herring stated that on attending the first night he had to stifle giggles during a rendition of Goris' "Send In the Clowns" to the disapproval of audience members, he found out later that it was a song about date rape.

Italy

In Rome "Il Pene Parlante" was performed by Diego Ruiz with added political jokes about Silvio Berlusconi.

France

Michel Leeb performed the French version, it had a highly successful six-month run entitled "Qu'est-ce que Sexe". Leeb's performance was released on DVD in 2004.

== Book ==
The book was released in the UK, Russia and the USA. Like the stand-up show, the book features statistics gathered by Herring in two long running online polls, one for men and another for women, exploring their thoughts about the penis asking questions such as "Has [fathering any children] altered your perspective on your penis?" and "Have you ever faked an orgasm." Herring used these to reveal that many stereotypes about men and their feelings towards their genitals are false. The book explores sex education, the penis's role throughout history and culture, parenting, circumcision, masturbation, sexual orientation, anxiety and penis worship.

- Talking Cock Ebury Press ISBN 978-1-56025-608-3 (2003) reprinted (2012)

== Podcast ==
Herring, known as being a prolific podcaster with such shows as As It Occurs To Me and Richard Herring's Leicester Square Theatre Podcast published the Talking Cock podcast from February to May 2013 to run alongside his second national tour of the show. He used it to promote his tour dates often reading large sections from the book. There were eleven episodes in total.
