= The Seven Raymonds =

The Seven Raymonds were a comic revue troupe founded in 1987 by University of Oxford undergraduates.

The Seven Raymonds were Stewart Lee, Richard Herring, Emma Kennedy, Michael Cosgrave, Richard Canning, and Jo Renshaw. They supported the Oxford Revue at the Edinburgh Festival Fringe in 1987.

They appeared at the Edinburgh Fringe in 1987 in the show The Seven Raymonds: KMnO4 – The Potassium Permanganate Extravaganza.

The troupe fell out over the continuing involvement of Jo Renshaw. After Renshaw was told she could not take part further, arguments ensued and Richard Canning subsequently left the group. He was replaced by comic writer Tim Richardson.

Lee and Herring became a successful double act on radio and television. Cosgrave became a jazz musician with Celtic band Sin É and the bluegrass/jam band Daily Planet. Kennedy became a television presenter, actress and writer. Canning is an academic. Richardson works as a journalist and writer.
