= Lionel Nimrod's Inexplicable World =

Lionel Nimrod's Inexplicable World is a BBC Radio 4 comedy series starring Stewart Lee and Richard Herring (the comedy duo Lee and Herring), and narrated by Tom Baker as the title character Lionel Nimrod. The show parodies the Leonard Nimoy programme "In Search Of...". Over two series Lee and Herring tackled, and explained, such varying topics as Monsters, Love, The Human Body, and, finally, The Unexplained itself.

The opening music, over which "Lionel Nimrod" introduces each show, is Jerry Goldsmith's theme to the film Logan's Run.

The series included performances by Armando Iannucci and Rebecca Front, who would both continue to work with Lee and Herring on many of their following productions. The series was produced by Sarah Smith.

== Episodes ==
=== Series 1 ===
No. overall	No. in series	Title	Original release date
1	1	"Monsters"	8 October 1992
2	2	"Creation"	15 October 1992
3	3	"Death"	22 October 1992
4	4	"Good & Evil"	29 October 1992
5	5	"The Human Mind"	5 November 1992
6	6	"Love"	12 November 1992

=== Series 2 ===
No. overall	No. in series	Title	Original release date
7	1	"Magic"	15 July 1993
8	2	"The Future"	22 July 1993
9	3	"The Human Body"	29 July 1993
10	4	"The Sea"	5 August 1993
11	5	"The Scheme of Things"	12 August 1993
12	6	"The Unexplained"	19 August 1993
