= Fist of Fun =

British comedy radio and TV series

- Genre: Comedy
- Starring: Stewart Lee; Richard Herring
- Country of origin: United Kingdom
- Original language: English
- No. of series: 2
- No. of episodes: 12

Production
- Running time: 30 minutes

Original release
- Network: BBC2
- Release: 11 April 1995 – 22 March 1996

Fist of Fun is a British comedy show, initially a BBC Radio 1 series in 1993 and then a BBC2 television series in 1995. It was written by and starred the comedians Stewart Lee and Richard Herring. Each episode of Fist of Fun consisted of disparate sketches, stand-up comedy segments, dialogues, and situations.

It was broadcast at 9:00 p.m. on Tuesday nights. The second series was aired on Friday nights. The show was not given a third series but Lee and Herring went on to create This Morning with Richard Not Judy, for BBC2.

Other comedians who appeared in the series went on to fame themselves, including Kevin Eldon, Peter Baynham, Ronni Ancona, Alistair McGowan, Al Murray, Ant & Dec, John Thomson, Rebecca Front, Mel Giedroyc, Sue Perkins, Ben Moor and Sally Phillips.

== Major characters ==
- Simon Quinlank, a self-proclaimed "Hobby Lion" and "King of All Hobbies" and "Duke of Hobby", played by Kevin Eldon. In each episode, he presents a slot (filmed on camcorder by an unseen assistant) related to his latest invented hobby. He is known for his maniacal laughter, frequent cries of "Answer me!" and loathing for never-seen rival Neil Petark. He also has a fondness for "weak lemon drink". The character reappeared in Lee and Herring's later show This Morning with Richard Not Judy.
- "Rod Hull", a recurring character who claims to be the genuine Rod Hull but is in fact an obvious fraud. He has an obsession with jelly (possibly the reason for his attempted imitation is a belief that the real Rod Hull would receive gifts of jelly), and has a false arm. He persistently claims that the false arm is real despite the fact that he has an actual real arm tucked inside his shirt. This climaxed with the impostor confronted by the real Rod Hull, making a guest appearance. This entire sketch appears to have been based on a real life incident where Kiss drummer Peter Criss confronted his own impostor on the Phil Donahue show. Also played by Kevin Eldon.
- Peter, a 31-year-old Welsh virgin from Balham who provides lifestyle tips from his unique perspective, usually cheap (and revolting) alternatives to well known recipes. Played (and written) by Peter Baynham.

== DVD release ==
The series was never released by the BBC on either VHS or DVD but in May 2011 Stewart Lee announced that the rights to the show had been purchased by independent distributor Go Faster Stripe with an eye to release. The first series was released in early December 2011 and the second series in November 2012 albeit with slight edits made for editorial reasons at the request of the BBC. This included material regarding Princess Diana and Morris Mitchener, whose parents attempted to sue the West Yorkshire playhouse after a production of Peter Pan scared the infant Mitchener.
