= This Morning with Richard Not Judy =

Comedy television series

- Genre: Comedy
- Starring: Stewart Lee; Richard Herring
- Country of origin: United Kingdom
- Original language: English
- No. of series: 2
- No. of episodes: 18

Production
- Executive producer: Jon Plowman
- Running time: 45 mins

Original release
- Network: BBC Two
- Release: 15 February 1998 – 13 June 1999

This Morning With Richard Not Judy or TMWRNJ /təˈwʌmrəndʒə/ (Note: Richard Herring would routinely pronounce the acronym as if the 'M' and 'W' had changed places (TWMRNJ) rather than pronouncing it as /təmˈwʊrən.dʒə/) is a BBC comedy television programme, written by and starring Lee and Herring. Two series were broadcast in the morning slot on BBC Two in 1998 and 1999. The name was a satirical reference to ITV's This Morning, at the time popularly referred to as This Morning with Richard and Judy.

Presented in a daytime chat show format in front of a live studio audience, the programme featured live material from the show's cast as well as pre-recorded sketches. Much of the show's humour would oscillate between the intellectual and puerile and involved irony, repetition and the often strange obsessions of Richard Herring, such as rating the milk of all creatures and attempting to popularise the acronym of the show (TMWRNJ), in the style of Tiswas.

Richard Thomas provided music on keyboards throughout the show. Lee and Herring were assisted by their 'nubile slave duo' Trevor and Nathalie (Trevor Lock and Nathalie Brandon), who were normally mute ("We can't afford to pay you to speak") and would sometimes be dressed in outlandish costumes. Kevin Eldon appears in both series, reprising some of his characters from the earlier Lee & Herring series Fist of Fun, such as Simon Quinlank, the "King of Hobbies".

TMWRNJ was a regular subject of complaints on Points of View, in particular for content seen as inappropriate being broadcast in an early timeslot and sketches making fun of Jesus being shown on Sundays.

== Edinburgh Fringe performance ==
This Morning with Richard Not Judy began as a performance at the Edinburgh Festival Fringe. This performance was reviewed in The Times and The Independent.

== Regular features: Series 1 and 2 ==
=== The Five Aims ===
Every week, Lee and Herring discussed five aims they wanted to implement before the end of the series, a parody of New Labour's pledge cards from the 1997 General Election.

=== King, or Queen, of the Show ===
In each episode, a member of the audience would be crowned "King, or Queen, of the Show", and would be served various items from a trolley - often linked by the theme of the show - by Trevor and Nathalie. To begin with, the King or Queen was chosen based on criteria upon arriving to the show, such as being the youngest or richest member of the audience, and later the person who sent in the best submission to the show's competition would be invited to appear on the show. In the second series the audience voted for which of three contenders would be the King, or Queen, of the Show.

=== The Curious Orange ===
Played by Paul Putner, a large talking orange would posit seemingly deep questions about life, that were in fact easily answered. At the end of the first series, having been revealed to be Richard Herring's illegitimate son, he was crushed to death and "juiced", but he was later reconstituted by a mad scientist. Throughout the second series his behaviour became increasingly sinister, and for a while he was replaced by The Curious Alien. The name is derived from the song "Kurious Oranj" (from the album I Am Kurious Oranj) by The Fall, which was used to introduce each Curious Orange segment.

=== Histor's Eye ===
Supposedly a low-budget children's television programme broadcast on Sky, puppet pirate crows Histor (operated and voiced by Herring) and Pliny (Lee) would transport themselves through time to view past events. The script would feature Pliny regularly making deliberately weak egg and bird-related puns, which would eventually drive Histor to insanity and murder him. The set-up for this sketch would be Herring naively misunderstanding media reports of recent events, with Lee realising the best way to make him understand better is showing him "an educational film for the under fives" he taped from cable TV.

=== When Insects Attack ===
A parody of the show When Animals Attack!, American actor Greg Evigan (in reality Mark Gatiss) provides narration for a depiction of someone being improbably attacked by insects - except when The Lettuce Family is attacked by a slug, which Evigan points out is a mollusc. In the second series this segment became When Things Get Knocked Over, Spill, or Fall Out of Cupboards.

=== Pause for Thought for the Day ===
The Unusual Priest, played by Kevin Eldon, would present ethical dilemmas and tying them back in to religion and Jesus. Based on a character called Monsignor Treeb-Lopez originally created by Lee and Herring for the satirical radio news show On The Hour.

== Regular features: Series 1 ==
=== The Profit Making Phone Opinion Poll ===
Each week the show staged a phone-in, hosted by 'Jo Unwin and Her Husband, the actor Kevin Eldon', present viewers with three options to resolve an issue in the week's news - purely designed to make money for Lee and Herring. (The third option was inevitably about how trivial phone opinion polls about such important issues are morally offensive.)

=== The Organ Gang ===
(Also known as TOG, in keeping with Rich's abbreviation obsession) A spoof children's series, drawn by Joseph Champniss and narrated by Brian Cant, with characters who were all organs of the human body who would have some adventure and end up "laughing for a whole five minutes." While narrating the final episode Cant began a rant about the quality of the animation.

=== The Ironic Review ===
A fly-on-the-wall documentary about a so-called cutting edge magazine, ostensibly a satire of The Modern Review, with the journalists being in bitter competition to see who could write the most "ironic" article.

=== Men of Achievement 1974 ===
A short item in which an entry in the book of the same name would be read out. At one point, it was noted as the least popular part of the show, but to be kept in 'until it becomes so popular, it gets its own series'. Men whose entries were read included Harold Warner Munn, Robin Dudding, and Moritz Jagendorf.

=== The School ===
A fly-on-the-wall documentary focusing on two English teachers at a comprehensive secondary school; Mr Alan Harris (Herring) is an traditional teacher who enjoys marking but is derided by his students and the other teachers; Mr Ian Kennedy (Lee) is a modern teacher who constantly attempts to rock the establishment. The former is described by the school's head master as a 'good man' and the latter described as 'a fuckwit'.

=== Roger Crowley ===
Played by Roger Mann, the self-styled 'most evil man alive' would interrupt the broadcast to outline his latest absurd plan for world domination.

=== Special Guests ===
The first series featured guests interviewed by Lee and Herring, including Mel & Sue, Jenny Eclair, Peter Baynham and Jack Docherty.

== Regular features: Series 2 ==
=== Sunday Heroes ===
Sketches featuring Jesus (Lee) attempting to preach to his disciples in the manner of a school teacher trying to educate a difficult class. Matthew (Herring) would regularly question Jesus's teaching and his inability to answer follow-up questions. Peter (Carlton Dixon) was depicted as a smug class swot, who would talk down to the others for not understanding. Judas (Eldon) would regularly be admonished for laughing at double entendres. Thomas (Putner) doubted things, Thaddeus (Lock) was trying to work out what he could do differently, and the fictional Ian (Emma Kennedy) was only following Jesus as he misunderstood the phrase "fishers of men".

=== The Corrs Shrine ===
A shrine to the Corrs or more correctly 'The Corrs Shrine'. Essentially Herring's infatuation with Andrea Corr. The rest of them (particularly the "Man Corr") he didn't care for, a joke based on the similar looks of the Corr sisters.

=== Extra Final Scene ===
This would take the form of a tacked-on ending for a different film each week, for example as extra final scene for Blues Brothers 2000 which saw Dan Aykroyd and John Goodman laughing and urinating on the grave of John Belushi before driving off in the Bluesmobile. Another was made for Titanic, in which Leonardo DiCaprio's character swims to the surface after Kate Winslet is rescued to celebrate finally escaping her clutches.

=== Angus Deayton's Authorised History Of Alternative Comedy (with Angus Deayton) ===
A satirical version of a BBC series that explored the boom in alternative comedy in the 1970s and early 1980s. The item would involve a comedian (either the portrayal of a real life person or a generic stand-up) reminisce about the "amazing times" they had, while shamelessly exaggerating their trailblazing influence. The characters would always be seen drinking from an SDP mug, a reference to the political party famously supported by John Cleese (whose picture appeared on the title screen) during the 1980s. Angus Deayton himself did not appear.

=== Curious Alien ===
In series 2 the Curious Orange was replaced by the Curious Alien as Stew became increasingly frustrated with the Orange's behaviour.

=== Rich's Robbie Williams Tattoo ===
Rich becomes obsessed with Robbie Williams as a result of his alleged relationship with Andrea Corr. To display his love for the former Take That member Rich draws a felt tip pen tattoo on his stomach in the shape of Robbie Williams.

=== Nostradamus and his horse David Collins ===
A regular feature in the second series, medieval seer Nostradamus (played by TV's Emma Kennedy with a false beard, a "flighty" horse called David Collins and, for no adequately explored reason, a Welsh accent) would give his predictions for the week ahead, which would often be either predetermined, extremely vague or completely absurd. The start of the segment would look at the previous week's predictions: if they were not correct, Nostradamus would be punished by a nipple cripple, or something similarly pseudo-sexual, by Richard. During one episode Richard obsessed about cress for a whole show, as a spoof of product placement deals. When Nostradamus only got one out of three predictions correct, a barbecue of cress was burnt with a blowlamp.

As the series progressed, it became clear that there was sexual tension between Herring and Nostradamus, the latter openly enjoying the physical punishments handed out by the former. Herring believed their love to be forbidden since both were "men".

=== Richard Herring's Food and Milk ===
A weekly segment in which Richard Herring would taste a different milk (shrew, tapir, blue whale, Jesus milk, American beaver milk, the milk of human kindness) and give a rating out of ten. Despite the name no solid food was ever featured in this piece (although Golden Grahams also featured elsewhere on the show several times, apparently to ensure this unloved cereal did not go unnoticed in the UK). He would end with the line "Remember, there'll always be milk". According to Stewart Lee, the five-second opening jingle that plays when the milk of the week is announced comes from a piece by avant-garde composer Harrison Birtwistle. The producers doctored the frequencies to make the already abrasive noise sound much louder than anything else, to be jarring to hungover viewers.

=== Lazy Comedy Slags ===
Lee and Herring would discuss lazy comedy clichés, such as jokes that end by revealing an incongruous fact and jokes designed to play on the audience's sense of nostalgia for the 1970s. During one episode they also brainstormed lazy comedy ideas for the BBC. Their ideas would usually include characters called Ian – a running joke which also featured in Sunday Heroes, with one of the disciples being called Ian.

=== Lazy TV Executive Twits ===
Lee and Herring discussed the laziness of TV executives after Rich received an offer from Channel 5 to make a programme about fishing due to his surname. They decided to submit some ideas to Channel 5 themselves, which included:

- Hugh Fearnley-Whittingstall's Huge Furry Wishing Stall

Hugh Fearnley-Whittingstall tours the country in a gigantic mink lined stall granting peoples' wishes.

- Fox watch with Dr Fox

Dr Fox hides a secret camera in the toilet of small American actor Michael J. Fox and watches him go about his daily ablutions.

- Jeremy Paxman's Pacman

Jeremy Paxman goes round the country on a moped playing the early arcade game Pac-Man. He is not allowed to leave any town until he has clocked up the highest score for that machine.

- Van Outen's Van Outings

Denise Van Outen goes out in a van and meets other people with 'Van' in their name and outs them as homosexual. Whether they are or not.

== Transmission details ==
- Number of episodes: 18
- Running-time: 45 minutes
- Series 1 (8 episodes): 15 February – 5 April 1998 – BBC Two, Sundays at 12.15
- Series 2 (10 episodes): 21 March – 13 June 1999 – BBC Two, Sundays, mostly at 12.15
- Shortened (30-minute) repeats of the programmes were aired by BBC Two on the Friday following each original broadcast

== Reunions ==
=== Lee & Herring at Tedstock (Bloomsbury Theatre), 5 February 2007 ===
Stewart Lee and Richard Herring reformed their act after a period of eight years to perform a brief selection of their old material at Tedstock 2007, at the Bloomsbury Theatre, London. The pair opened with a pastiche of the Mitchell and Webb PC vs. Mac adverts shown that year, which then led on to a rant by Rich that "It should have been us Stew!"

=== TMWRNJ Reunion Show at The Lyric, Hammersmith Nov 2008 ===
Lee and Herring performed a 40-minute selection of their TMWRNJ material at a 'reunion gig' at the Lyric Hammersmith in November 2008.

== DVD release ==
In 2014 Richard Herring wrote that he was attempting to acquire the rights of TMWRNJ from the BBC to release the two series on DVD. However, in February 2015 he announced that the release would now not be happening, saying "It's not happening and I doubt it ever will, Nothing you or I can do about it." In an interview with Mustard magazine, Stewart Lee explained that the DVD's cancellation was due to a financial decision and his reluctance to fund what he considers a vanity project at this time. Lee does not however, rule out its future release.
