= Richard Herring =

English comedian and writer (born 1967)

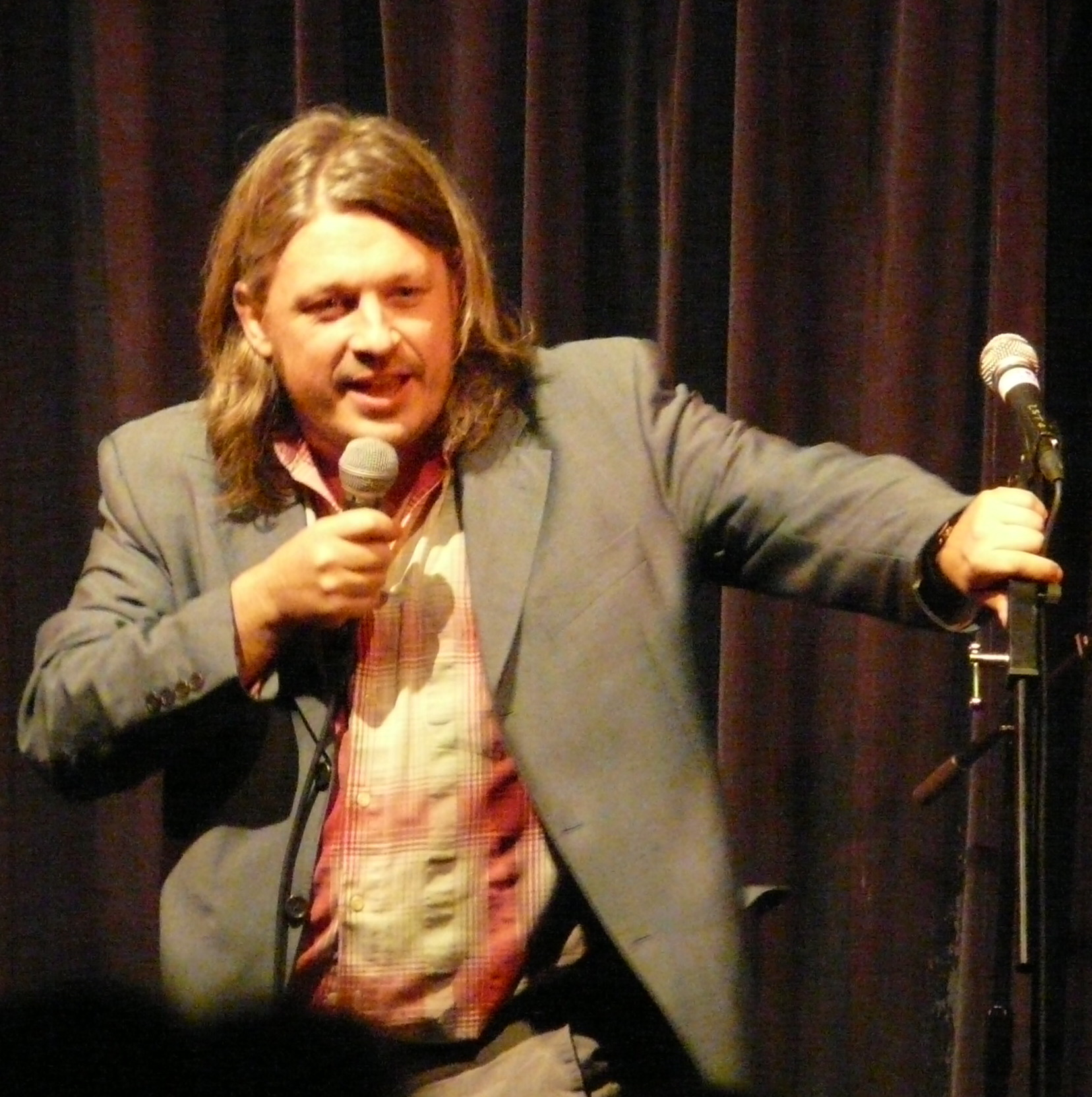
- Herring during the final performance of As It Occurs To Me in 2011
- Born: Richard Keith Herring; 12 July 1967 (age 59); Pocklington, East Yorkshire, England
- Education: St Catherine's College, Oxford
- Notable work: Fist of Fun; This Morning with Richard Not Judy; Time Gentlemen Please; The Collings and Herrin Podcast; Richard Herring's Leicester Square Theatre Podcast
- Spouse: Catie Wilkins (m. 2012)
- Children: 2

Comedy career
- Years active: 1987–present
- Medium: Stand up, radio, television, podcast
- Genres: Black comedy, insult comedy, satire, irony, wit, deadpan

Richard Keith Herring (born 12 July 1967) is an English comedian and writer whose early work includes the comedy double act Lee and Herring (alongside Stewart Lee). He is described by The British Theatre Guide as "one of the leading hidden masters of modern British comedy".

Towards the end of the double act, Herring also worked as a writer, producing four plays. After Lee and Herring went their separate ways he co-wrote the sitcom Time Gentlemen Please, but quickly returned to performance with concept-driven one-man shows like Talking Cock, Hitler Moustache and Christ on a Bike as well as regular circuit stand-up. Herring has created fourteen of these stand-up shows since 2001, performing them for eleven consecutive years from 2004 to 2014 at the Edinburgh Festival Fringe, with annual tours and a final performance recorded for DVD. His 2016–17 show was a 'best of' tour, drawing from these shows.

Herring is recognised as a pioneer of comedy podcasting, initially with broadcaster Andrew Collins on The Collings and Herrin Podcast and subsequently with high-profile comedians and celebrities such as Dawn French, Michael Palin and Stephen Fry on Richard Herring's Leicester Square Theatre Podcast. He has maintained a daily blog called Warming Up since 25 November 2002. In September 2024 he started publishing the blog (and other material) on Substack where he has 10000+ subscribers.

== Early life ==
Herring was born on 12 July 1967 in Pocklington, East Yorkshire, and grew up in Cheddar, Somerset. He is the youngest of three children. He attended The Kings of Wessex School, where his father was the headmaster and maths teacher. This later formed the basis of his 2008 stand-up show, The Headmaster's Son. Herring's mother was also a teacher. The 2007 ITV comedy drama You Can Choose Your Friends, which he wrote and also starred in, was based on his family. Some of the same characters later featured in the Radio 4 series "Relativity".

Herring was a student at St Catherine's College, Oxford, where he wrote and performed for a comedy troupe known as the Seven Raymonds as well as the Oxford Revue. He attained a 2:1 in History.

== Career ==
=== Lee and Herring ===
Between 1992 and 2000, Richard was half of the stand-up comedy double act with Stewart Lee. Their television work included Fist of Fun, Festival of Fun, and This Morning With Richard Not Judy, and they had been collaborating on stage and radio projects since the 1980s.

Lee and Herring wrote material for Chris Morris and Armando Iannucci's On the Hour in 1991 and the duo contributed to the creation of the character that was to be Alan Partridge. In 1992 and 1993, they wrote and performed Lionel Nimrod's Inexplicable World for Radio 4. For Radio 1, they wrote and performed one series of Fist of Fun in 1993, remaking it for television in 1995 and 1996. They hosted a series on Radio 1 in 1994 and 1995, called Lee and Herring. A final television partnership with Lee, This Morning With Richard Not Judy, ran for 18 episodes over two series until being cancelled "as a result of BBC management reshuffles".

=== Solo work ===
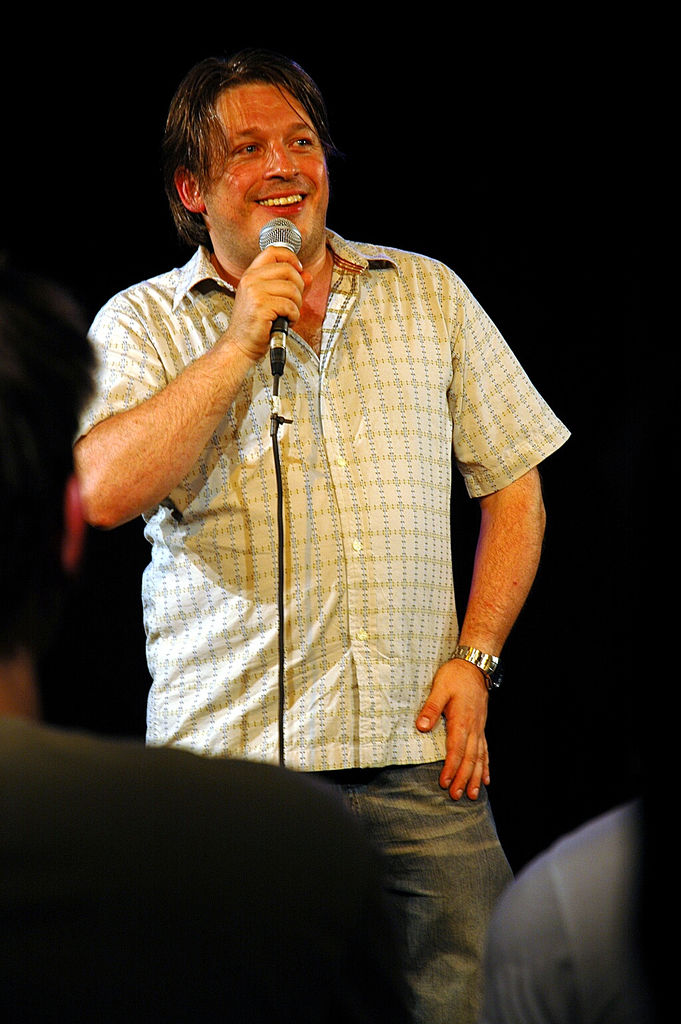
Richard Herring performing his show Someone Likes Yoghurt at The Pleasance Theatre, during the 2005 Edinburgh Festival Fringe

Herring has written and performed in fourteen one-man shows, eleven of them in consecutive years. A Herring show typically starts with a run at the Edinburgh Festival Fringe, continues with an extensive UK tour and ends with a recorded performance for DVD.

For radio, Herring co-wrote and presented the history-based sketch show That Was Then, This Is Now. For television, he co-wrote Al Murray's sitcom Time Gentlemen Please. He also contributed to the third series of Little Britain as script editor.

In 2005, he presented a chat show called Heads Up with Richard Herring on the Pokerzone channel, in which he interviewed professional poker players and celebrities about their careers and their love of the game. There were 10 episodes in total.

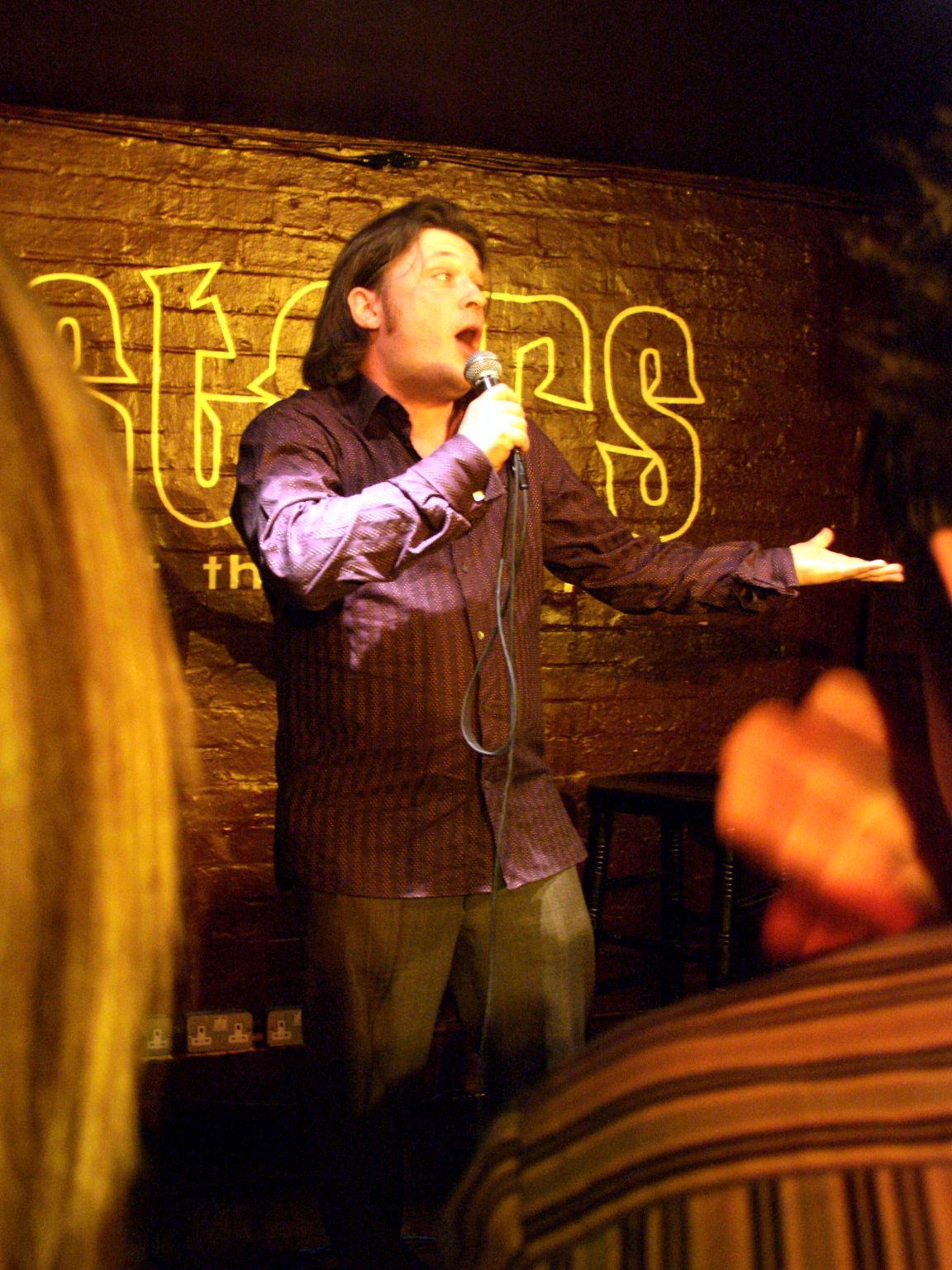
Performing at the Kings Head pub in Crouch End, London

In February 2007, filming began on Herring's comedy drama You Can Choose Your Friends. As well as writing the script, he also acted alongside Gordon Kennedy, Claire Skinner, Rebecca Front, Sarah-Jane Potts, Robert Daws, Anton Rodgers and Julia McKenzie. The show was broadcast on ITV on 7 June 2007.

In January 2008 he began the Collings and Herrin podcast with Andrew Collins. They celebrated their second anniversary with a live "100th" podcast (it was actually the 105th recording) at the Leicester Square Theatre. On 30 January 2010 the pair began a tenure of sitting in for Adam and Joe on BBC Radio 6 Music on Saturdays mornings, a slot they occupied for more than a year.

Herring's 2008 stand-up set The Headmaster's Son earned four 5-star reviews and several 4-star reviews. The set covers his experience growing up in The Kings of Wessex School in Somerset where his father worked as headmaster and how this may have been the origin of his fondness for telling puerile jokes. The show was seen by critics as a thoughtful look at his upbringing, and his relationship with his father, to whom the show is dedicated.

Herring launched his show, Hitler Moustache in 2009 to see if he "could reclaim the toothbrush moustache for comedy – it was Chaplin's first, then Hitler ruined it." The show discusses broader issues, such as fascism and the British National Party. Herring and some of his contemporaries, including Dave Gorman, were angered when material from his show was misrepresented in a Guardian column by critic Brian Logan.

On 14 October 2010, his Radio 4 series Richard Herring's Objective was first broadcast. Here Herring attempts to reclaim controversial items, starting with the toothbrush moustache and moving onto the hoodie, Flag of England and Dolly the Sheep. An Edinburgh special about the See-you-Jimmy hat was broadcast in August 2011 and a second series was recorded in October 2011 with episodes about the golliwog, the wheelchair, Page 3 and the old school tie.

On 27 December 2010, Herring finished second on Celebrity Mastermind with a final score of 34 points. His specialist subject was Rasputin. He was The Pod Delusion "Comedian of the Year 2010."

In May 2011 it was announced that Fist of Fun would be released on DVD by Go Faster Stripe. The first series was released in December 2011 and the second in November 2012, winning 'Best DVD' at the 2013 Chortle Awards

In August and September 2015, he performed all 11 of his previous one man shows, plus a new one, Happy Now?, at the Leicester Square Theatre over the course of six weekends in a season called "The Twelve Shows of Herring". Happy Now? was taken on a 50-plus date UK tour between October 2015 and June 2016. His 2017 tour show was called Richard Herring — The Best. His 2017 Edinburgh Fringe show is called "Oh Frig, I'm 50!" This was taken on a UK tour in the Spring of 2018.

In 2020, Herring was a contestant on the tenth series of Taskmaster. He was the series' eventual winner. Herring later returned to compete against fellow winners Ed Gamble, Kerry Godliman, Liza Tarbuck and Lou Sanders for the second "Champion of Champions" special, which he also won.

In May 2024 he began a tour of a new stand up show, 'Can I Have My Ball Back?' based on his experience of testicular cancer. A second leg of the tour began on 31 January 2025.

In 2026, he was a contestant in The Great Stand Up to Cancer Bake Off.

In April 2026 he appeared as Frank in a production of Educating Rita at the Queen Mother Theatre in Hitchin.

In 2026, Herring was a contestant in The Great Celebrity Pottery Throw Down. He was Potter of the week for three of the five episodes, but lost to Layton Williams in the final.

=== Blogs, podcasts and internet ===
On 25 November 2002 Herring started his blog, Warming Up, as a way to overcome writer's block. Some ideas recorded in Warming Up have been used in his live shows. The first year of his blog is collected in two books, Bye Bye Balham and The Box Lady and Other Pesticles. In the autumn of 2024 the blog also became available on Substack where he has over 10,000 subscribers.

On 12 October 2009, Herring recorded the first episode of As It Occurs To Me, a weekly radio-style stand-up and sketch show made for the Internet. It stars himself alongside Emma Kennedy, Dan Tetsell and Christian Reilly. It currently stands at 18 episodes and 5 bonus mini-episodes. It was nominated for best internet show at the 2010 Sony Awards, though it failed to place. On 7 February 2011, As It Occurs to Me won the first Chortle Internet award On 20 March 2012 he retained it. In 2017, As It Occurs To Me returned as a six-episode web series.

In 2011, Herring began playing himself at snooker for an audio podcast called "Me1 vs Me2 Snooker". On 28 July 2016 he performed at the Tempting Failure extreme art festival In 2020 he started playing this with 32 personas on Twitch and appeared on Comedians: Home Alone on BBC2 in July with an edited frame of Me1 vs Me2.

In 2012, Herring recorded the first 16 episodes of the long-running Richard Herring's Leicester Square Theatre Podcast with guests including Tim Minchin, Herring's comedy partner Stewart Lee, Adam Buxton, David Mitchell and Armando Iannucci. It was nominated for a Sony Award for Best Comedy alongside a list of BBC produced comedy shows in 2013. The show won the Bronze Award. In 2013, Herring won the Chortle Award for the podcast, which again won the award in 2014. In May and June 2013 he recorded nine podcasts with guests including Stephen Fry, Russell Brand and Mary Beard. His interview with Stephen Fry was covered by national and international news media including the BBC and Sky News when Fry revealed a recent suicide attempt. The series continued with Harry Shearer, Eddie Izzard and David Cross.

On 17 November 2013, he recorded the first episode of a six-part internet stand-up, sketch and interview show Richard Herring's Meaning of Life, structured around the philosophical concepts of 'Creation', 'the Paranormal', 'Love', 'Death', 'Good & Evil' and 'the Shape of Things To Come', the episode being broadcast online between February 2014 and early 2015.

In February 2014, the first Richard Herring Show was broadcast on Fubar Radio. Herring presented this with comedian Lou Sanders weekly, before quitting the show together; their final episode was broadcast on 24 May 2014.

On 8 March 2018, in aid of International Women's Day, Herring raised over £150,000 for domestic abuse charity Refuge by responding to anyone on Twitter who asked when International Men's Day was (it is 19 November). He did the same on 8 March 2019, raising almost £130,000. He repeated the exercise on 8 March 2020 and streamed himself responding to tweets live on Twitch. He raised a further £70,000. In 2020 he wrote a book about his experiences and toxic masculinity called The Problem With Men which was published on 5 November.

In March 2020 Herring started streaming regularly on Twitch as the world went into lockdown. He produced weekly remote episodes of his podcast, Richard Herring's Leicester Square Theatre Podcast, did a live feed of Stone Clearing most weekday mornings and played himself at snooker (with 32 personas) in the evening. He also did occasional non-director's commentaries for films, as well as a newspaper review with his 128-year-old ventriloquist dummy called Ally and Herring's Twitch of Fun. On 28 January 2026 he started a new ventriloquism project called Rich and Ally's Craven Newsround, a news service that purports to "bring the people the REAL news, not the lies of the Mainstream Media", which has broadcast on most weekdays ever since. Some people have noticed a similarity between this and the John Craven's Newsround though Herring claims this is coincidental.

In September 2023, Herring began a tour of Richard Herring's Leicester Square Theatre Podcast around the UK.

== Personal life ==
Herring was formerly in a relationship with the actress Julia Sawalha, some years after joking on Fist of Fun that "My ideal woman has the head of Julia Sawalha and the body of Julia Sawalha."

Before Sawalha he dated the actress Catherine Shepherd as revealed by Sally Phillips in 2022 on Herring's RHLSTP 409 podcast. He also dated Kelly Marcel and Sally Phillips.

In April 2012, Herring married author and comedian Catie Wilkins. They had their first child, a daughter, in February 2015, followed by a son in October 2017.

Herring has raised money for Scope since 2003, and ran the London Marathon in aid of the charity in 2004 as well as the Royal Parks Foundation Half Marathon in 2011, 2013 and 2014. In January 2011 he was nominated for a JustGiving Life Time Achievement Award for his extensive work in helping to raise money, awareness and support for Scope. In 2012 he was made a Patron of Scope.

In 2010 he was made a patron of Humanists UK (formerly The British Humanist Association) and said:

"It's the 21st century and it's time the human race accepted that we're flying this plane and no one out there is going to save us from crashing it. So let's work together, hey?"

In February 2021 he had an orchiectomy to remove a cancerous testicle, undergoing one shot of chemotherapy a month later. In November 2021 he ran the Hertfordshire Half Marathon and raised £30,000 for the hospitals that treated his condition. His book about the experience Can I Have My Ball Back? was published in October 2022. In April 2022 it was announced that Herring had become an ambassador for Movember. In June 2026 he stated that he was being treated for hairy cell leukaemia.

== Collections ==
The University of Kent holds material relating to Herring's career as part of the British Stand-Up Comedy Archive. The Richard Herring Collection contains performance scripts, promotional items, published material, and digital documents and scans.

== Body of work ==
=== Stand up shows ===
Year	Show	Cycle		
Year	Show	Edinburgh	Tour	DVD
1994	Richard Herring is Fat	Yes		
1995	Richard Herring is All Man	Yes		
2001	Christ on a Bike	Yes	Yes	
2002/3	Talking Cock	Yes	Yes	
2004	The 12 Tasks of Hercules Terrace	Yes	Yes	Yes
2005	Someone Likes Yoghurt	Yes	Yes	Yes
2006	Ménage à un	Yes	Yes	Yes
2007	Oh Fuck, I'm 40!	Yes	Yes	Yes
2008	The Headmaster's Son	Yes	Yes	Yes
2009	Hitler Moustache	Yes	Yes	Yes
2010	Christ on a Bike: The Second Coming	Yes	Yes	Yes
2011	What Is Love, Anyway?	Yes	Yes	Yes
2012	Talking Cock: The Second Coming	Yes	Yes	Yes
2013	We're All Going To Die!	Yes	Yes	Yes
2014	Lord of the Dance Settee	Yes	Yes	Yes
2015	Happy Now?	No	Yes	Yes
2016	Richard Herring: The Best	No	Yes	No
2017	Oh Frig, I'm 50!	Yes	Yes	Yes
2024/5	Can I Have My Ball Back?	No	Yes	Yes

=== Television ===
Title	Released	Channel	DVD
Fist of Fun	1995–96	BBC 2	Yes
This Morning With Richard Not Judy	1998–99	BBC 2	No
Time Gentlemen Please	2000–02	Sky 1	Yes
Heads Up with Richard Herring	2005	Pokerzone	
You Can Choose Your Friends	2007	ITV	
Have I Got News For You	2010–11 (2 appearances)	BBC One	
Taskmaster	2020 and 2022	C4	
The Great British Bake Off – Stand Up To Cancer	2026	C4	
The Great Celebrity Pottery Throwdown	2026	C4	

=== Plays ===
Title	Year
Ra Ra Rasputin	1993
Punk's Not Dead	1996
Excavating Rita	1997
Playing Hide and Seek With Jesus	1998
It's Not The End of the World	1999
I Killed Rasputin	2014

=== Film ===
Title	Year
The Battersea Ripper	2006
Hard To Swallow (short)	2007
A Very British Cult (short)	2008
While You Were Away (short)	2016
Giddy Stratospheres	2021
Real Love (Yes, It's Real Love!)	TBA
Zak The Ripper!	2027

=== Radio ===
Title	Released	Station
On the Hour	1991–92	Radio 4
Lionel Nimrod's Inexplicable World	1992–93	Radio 4/Radio 1
Fist of Fun	1993	Radio 1
Lee and Herring	1994–95	Radio 1
That Was Then, This Is Now	2004–08	Radio 2
Banter	2005–08	Radio 4
Bad Habits	2008	Radio 4
Collins and Herring	2010–11	6Music
Richard Herring's Objective	2010–11	Radio 4
Bad Language	2013	Radio Scotland
The Richard Herring Show	2014	Fubar Radio
Relativity	2017–22	Radio 4

=== Podcasts/vodcasts ===
Title	Released	Audio/Video
Collings and Herrin	2008–11	Audio
As It Occurs To Me	2009–11	Audio
Collins and Herring	2010–11	Audio
Warming Up	2011–15	Audio
Richard Herring's Edinburgh Fringe Podcast	2011–13, 2017, 2019	Audio
Me1 vs Me2 Snooker with Richard Herring	2011–present	Audio
Richard Herring's Leicester Square Theatre Podcast	2012–present	Audio/Video
Talking Cock	2013	Audio
We're All Going to Die!	2013	Audio
Richard Herring's Meaning of Life	2014	Audio/Video
Lord of the Dance Settee	2015	Audio
The Twelve Shows of Richard Herring	2015	Audio
AIOTM Audio extra	2016–17	Audio
As It Occurs To Me (six-part web series)	2017	Video
Stone Clearing With Richard Herring	2018–present	Audio
Twitch channel rkherring	2020–present	Video
Ally and Herring's Twitch of Fun	2020–2025	Audio/Video
RHLSTP Book Club	2022–present	Audio/Video
Can I Have My Ball Back?	2023	Audio
Rich and Ally's Craven Newsround	2026	Audio/Video

=== Miscellaneous home media ===
Title	Format	Year
Lee and Herring's Fist of Fun	CD/Tape	1995
Lee and Herring Live	VHS	1996
Michel Leeb – Qu'est-ce que Sexe? (Talking Cock performed in French)	DVD	2004
On The Hour	CD	2008
Collings and Herrin: The Best of Earth Wind and Fire * *(and water)	CD	2010
As It Occurs To Me: Secret Stand Up	CD	2010
Collings and Herrin: War and Peace, Crime and Punishment	CD	2010
As It Occurs To Me: The Complete Cumpkin	CD	2011
10	DVD	2013

=== Books ===
Title	Publisher	ISBN	Year
Fist of Fun (With Stewart Lee)	BBC Books	ISBN 0-563-37185-4; ISBN 978-0-563-37185-4	1995
Talking Cock	Ebury	ISBN 978-1-56025-608-3	2003 (reprinted 2012)
Warming Up Volume I: Bye Bye Balham	Go Faster Stripe	ISBN 978-0-9560901-0-2	2008
How Not To Grow Up	Ebury	ISBN 0-09-193208-4 ISBN 978-0-09-193208-4	2010
Warming Up Volume II: The Box Lady and Other Pesticles	Go Faster Stripe		2012
Emergency Questions	Go Faster Stripe		2017
Christmas Emergency Questions	Go Faster Stripe		2017
Emergency Questions: 1001 conversation-savers for any situation	Sphere	ISBN 9780751574395 ISBN 978-0751574395	2018
The Problem With Men	Sphere	ISBN 0751581453 ISBN 978-0751581454	2020
A Guide to Ye Ancient Fcience of Ftone Clearing	Sky Potato		2020
Punani Self-Playing Snooker Sticker Album	Sky Potato		2020
Would You Rather?	Sphere	ISBN 0751585718 ISBN 978-0751585711	2021
Can I Have My Ball Back?	Sphere		2022
I, Right Bollock	Go Faster Stripe		2025

=== Other writing ===
- Warming Up blog (2002–present)
- Guardian How To Write (contributor) edited by Philip Oltermann The Guardian ISBN 0-85265-138-4 ISBN 978-0-85265-138-4 (2009)
- The Atheist Guide to Christmas Contributor (Editor Ariane Sherine) The Friday Project ISBN 978-0-00-732261-9 (2009)
- Shouting at the Telly (Contributor) (Editor John Grindrod) Faber and Faber ISBN 0-571-24802-0 ISBN 978-0-571-24802-5 (2009)
- Roger's Profanisaurus – Das Krapital Introduction Dennis Publishing ISBN 978-1-907232-90-9 (2010)
- Metro newspaper weekly column (2012–2016)
- Behind the Sofa: Celebrity Memories of Doctor Who (contributor) edited by Steve Berry Matador (2012)
- Dead Funny (Contributor) (Editors Robin Ince and Johnny Mains) Salt Publishing ISBN 9781907773761 (2014)
- Goodbye Europe: Writers and Artists Say Farewell (contributor) W&N ISBN 9780751574395 ISBN 978-1409177548 2017
- Slaughterhouse 5: 50th Anniversary Edition (contributor) Vintage ISBN 178487485X ISBN 978-1784874858 2019
- Zippy and Me by Ronnie Le Drew (foreword) Unbound ISBN 178352698X ISBN 978-1783526987 2019

== Awards and recognition ==
- Chortle Awards Internet Award 2011
- Chortle Awards Internet Award 2012
- Chortle Awards Internet Award 2013
- Radio Academy Awards Best Comedy – Bronze, 2013 (Richard Herring's Leicester Square Theatre Podcast)
- Chortle Awards Internet Award 2014
- Chortle Awards Internet Award 2018
- Chortle Awards Legend of Lockdown 2021
- British Podcast Awards Nominated Best Entertainment and Best Interview 2023

== See also ==
- Richard Herring's interview podcasts
