= The Collings and Herrin Podcast =

Comedy podcast

The Collings and Herrin podcast

Presentation
- Hosted by: Andrew Collins and Richard Herring
- Genre: Comedy
- Updates: Weekly

Production
- No. of episodes: 167

Publication
- Original release: 1 February 2008 – 4 November 2011

The Collings and Herrin Podcast was a topical podcast produced by broadcaster Andrew Collins and comedian Richard Herring. Its title derives from the recurring Richard Herring trope of misspelling names for comic effect.

Described as a "sideways look at the news", the podcast was discursive and based mainly on humorous analysis of the week's media coverage. It was light in tone but often veered into black comedy and crude humour as satire. It contained frequent uses of strong language and was described by a review in The Times as unsuitable for "sensitive souls".

A typical episode length was one hour, six minutes and thirty-six seconds, due to this being the maximum length of a GarageBand recording, the software normally used to record the podcast. The podcast was made for and hosted by the British Comedy Guide and was also distributed via iTunes.

On 26 July 2008, the podcast was named "Podcast of the Week" by the Times Newspaper and in November 2009, was regularly being downloaded by 23,000 listeners a week, with some episodes peaking at 29,000 listeners. The Guardian noted that the podcast captured "the spirit of Derek and Clive."

== History ==
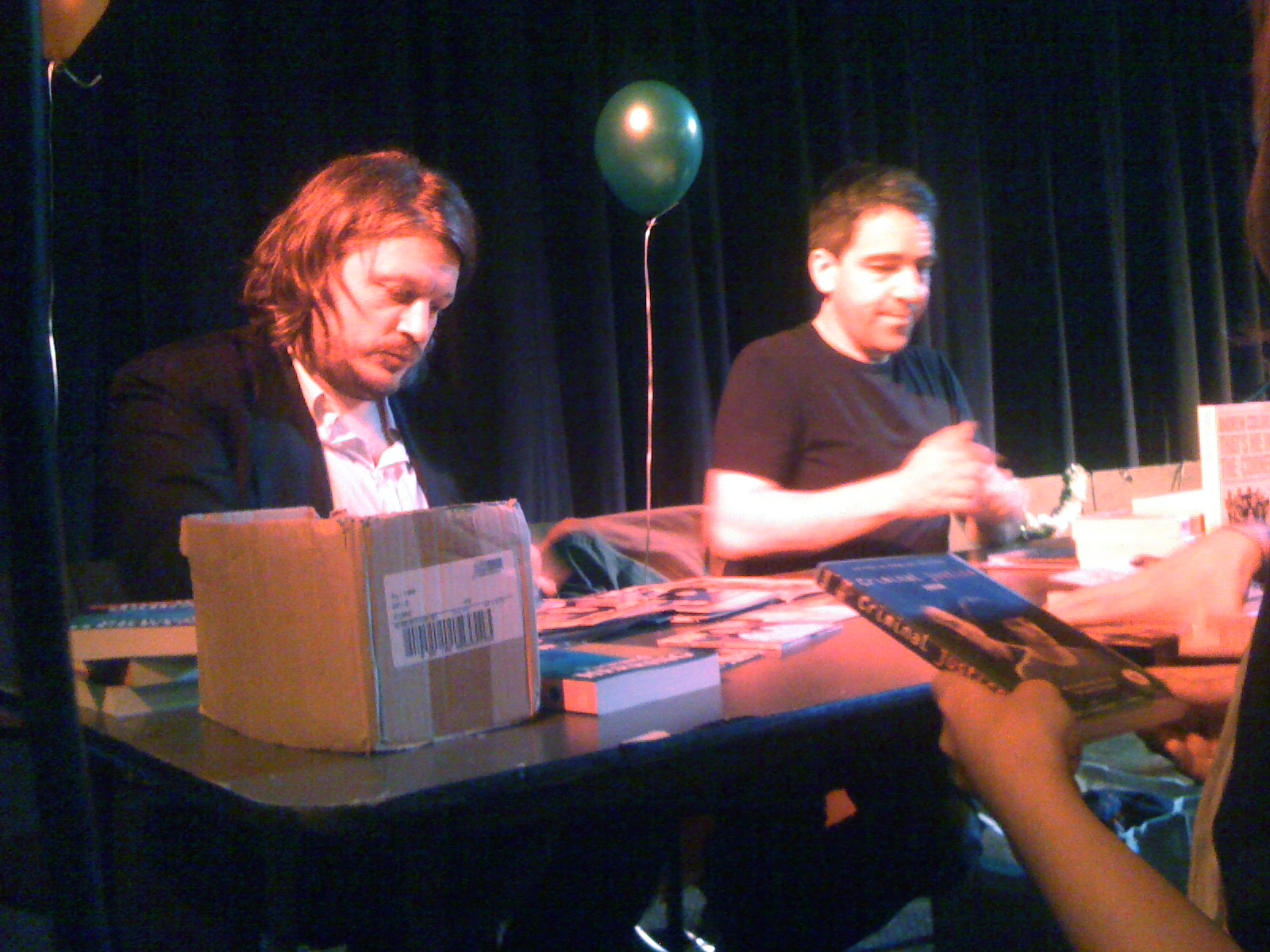
Herring and Collins in 2009

Between 10 April 2005 and 25 March 2007, Richard Herring would review the week's newspapers on Andrew Collins' BBC 6 Music radio show. These segments would often end with corpsing.

Collins and Herring have mentioned that they had felt constrained by BBC guidelines and had wanted to produce a darker, more humorous segment with a longer runtime. The idea of producing an independent podcast was first mooted publicly on Collins' blog on 14 January 2008, leading to a number of comments in support of the idea.

The first Collings and Herrin Podcast went live on 1 February 2008.

In June 2011, the podcast was announced to be on hiatus due to bad feelings between the pair. Andrew took an opportunity to host their old Saturday 6Music slot with another comedian, Josie Long, which Richard considered a betrayal of their double act. The podcast was resurrected on 4 November 2011 for podcast 167, but on 21 November the podcast ended permanently due to Andrew Collins feeling it was time to end the project.

== In other media ==
Live shows: An unusual development for a podcast was a number of recordings with a live audience, the first being on 6 August 2008 at the Edinburgh Fringe Festival, and others following in Brighton, London, Lincoln, Cardiff and more Edinburgh Festival shows. During 2009 these were often presented alongside Andrew Collins' solo 60 minute Secret Dancing performances. On 1 February 2010, the second anniversary of their first podcast, the pair performed their "100th" podcast (in actuality their 105th) to a sell-out crowd at the Leicester Square Theatre in London.

Radio: In January 2010 it was announced that the duo (as "Collins and Herring" rather than "Collings and Herrin") would be filling in for Adam and Joe on BBC 6 Music from 30 January. Their residency continued until April 2011. Each week the highlights were released as podcasts on the BBC website.

CD: On 22 March 2010 they released a CD of exclusive podcasts called Collings and Herrin: The Best of Earth, Wind and Fire* *(and water) through Go Faster Stripe. A second CD called Collings and Herrin: War and Peace, Crime and Punishment was released through Go Faster Stripe on 15 December 2010.

Vodcast: A number of video podcasts have been released parallel to the official podcast count. These are usually released as bonus features on Richard Herring comedy DVDs.

Bootleg: A bootleg recording of "legendary" Podcast 123 rescued this installment from permanent loss: This episode, recorded live at the 2010 Edinburgh Festival, is dubbed "legendary" in that technical problems ruined the official podcast recording and resulted in an audience evacuation towards the end of the show. For three weeks, the podcast was assumed lost until a fan came forward with a bootleg recording of poor but serviceable sound quality.

== Themes and running jokes ==
- Humour is mainly derived from the week's media coverage, particularly that of the tabloid newspapers. A favourite source of comedy has been the right-wing writing of Sun columnist Jon Gaunt and Daily Mail columnist Richard Littlejohn.
- Aside from media commentary, there are interpersonal running jokes. There is an ongoing parody of sexual tension as a plot device: Herring often suggests that he harbours amorous feelings for his co-presenter and discusses situations in which a seduction (or even a rape) might occur. Despite this layer of their relationship, a further running joke is that Collins and Herring are categorically colleagues and not friends.
- While on the podcast, Herring describes himself as the "Podcast Richard Herring": an alter-ego of the real Richard Herring afflicted with a Tourettes-like tendency to take jokes too far. Given that Herring often doesn't listen to the podcast and immediately forgets what took place during the recording, he has said that "maybe malign spirits possess me for 66 minutes and 36 seconds, meaning I have little to no memory of anything we talked about."
- For several early episodes, Collins reported a fascination with various examples of cottaging graffiti that he was finding between the tiles of the British Library toilets. Subsequently, encouraged by Herring, the words "Collings is a Bummer" became a widespread toilet-wall meme, and fans can still find them scrawled in grouting across the country.
- In one episode, Herring describes the act of facial ejaculation, including the appreciative sound one might make while on the receiving end: "nyum nyum nyum". This joke has subsequently been incorporated as a catchphrase in the podcast but also leaked into other work, such as their BBC 6 Music show. Another catchphrase from Herring: "Andrew Collings is a fucking idiot," has appeared several times in the BBC 6 Music show as the toned-down "Andrew Collins is a fricking idiot", and is the only catchphrase to have been included and then withdrawn from their collection of T-shirt designs.
- Following a controversy in the sixth season of Strictly Come Dancing and the telephone voting irregularities of later shows both Collins and Herring have employed the shrill exclamation "I paid a pound" (and variants thereof) to decry the false sense of entitlement felt by members of the public who have paid a meagre amount of money to register their opinions.
- Andrew Collins often mentions his real-life pet subject, the Mitford Sisters, which Herring denounces as boring and of no comedic value. Collins has produced a special solo podcast in which he delivers a lecture on this subject to a live audience.
- Wikipedia has played a part in some episodes of the podcast: listeners would subtly or blatantly alter Wikipedia entries when both Collins and Herring suggested they do so. As a consequence, Duncan Norvelle's page was temporarily locked to prevent people from adding various absurdities to his list of catchphrases.

=== Who is Virgilio Anderson? ===
Collins and Herring launched a culture jamming campaign, spreading the message "Who is Virgilio Anderson?" after a so-named member of the public from Macedonia used Richard Herring's name as the primary key for his Facebook page.

T-shirts were printed, Anderson-themed music videos were circulated on YouTube and many personalities (such as Steven Moffat) added the phrase to their websites. #virgilioanderson became the second most popular trending topic on Twitter on Thursday 2 July 2009 and the words "Who is Virgilio Anderson?" were scribbled in the grouting of the tiles in a toilet cubicle at the British Library (the cubicle second from the left in the east wing, first floor) on 16 July 2009.

Little is known of the true identity of Virgilio Anderson but information on his interests, favourite books and political beliefs were visible at his Facebook page, before it was deleted.
