= Rebecca Front =

English actress, writer and comedian (born 1964)

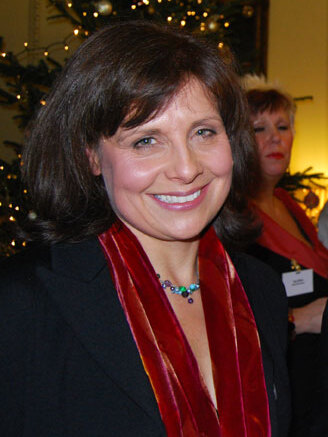
- Front in 2009
- Born: Rebecca Louise Front; 16 May 1964 (age 62); Stoke Newington, London, England
- Education: St Hugh's College, Oxford
- Occupations: Actress, writer, comedian
- Years active: 1991–present
- Spouse: Phil Clymer (m. 1998)
- Children: 2
- Family: Jeremy Front (brother)

Rebecca Louise Front (born 16 May 1964) is an English actress, writer and comedian. She won the 2010 BAFTA TV Award for Best Female Comedy Performance for The Thick of It (2009–2012). She is also known for her work in numerous other British comedies, including the radio show On The Hour (1992), The Day Today (1994), Knowing Me, Knowing You… with Alan Partridge (1994), Time Gentlemen Please (2000–2002), sketch show Big Train (2002), and Nighty Night (2004–2005).

Front has also been seen in a number of dramatic roles, including Chief Superintendent Jean Innocent in Lewis (2006–2014), Mrs. Bennet in Death Comes to Pemberley (2013), Mrs. Landau in The Eichmann Show (2015), Vera in Humans (2015), and Death in Paradise (2019). Her theatre credits include the musicals Company and The Fix at the Donmar Warehouse, directed by Sam Mendes.

== Early life and education ==
Front was born in Stoke Newington, London, to Sheila and Charles Front. Her mother wrote children's books, which her father illustrated. Her father also designed the title-logo on the cover of The Beatles' album Rubber Soul. Her father is Jewish and her mother is of Jewish and Welsh descent. Front was brought up in Reform Judaism.

Front gained admission to Ilford County High School for Girls, which converted to a comprehensive school during her time there.

Front became involved in comedy while at St Hugh's College at the University of Oxford, where she studied English and became the first female president of The Oxford Revue. She also trained at the Webber Douglas Academy of Dramatic Art.

== Career ==
=== 1980s: Career beginnings ===
While at Oxford in 1984, Front took part in the revue Stop the Weak. The tour played in Oxford itself, the Gate Theatre, Notting Hill, Edinburgh, Salisbury, and Romsey. In 1985, Front teamed up with Sioned Wiliam and Jon Magnusson to take the show The Bobo Girls go BOO to Edinburgh.

In the late 1980s, Front made a short promotional video on energy conservation with Michael Simkins.

=== 1990s: On the Hour, Alan Partridge ===
Front achieved a higher profile as a result of her work with Stewart Lee and Richard Herring on the radio shows Lionel Nimrod's Inexplicable World and On the Hour, and the television and radio series Fist of Fun. She went on to form a close professional association with Chris Morris, Armando Iannucci, Doon Mackichan and Steve Coogan, who all transferred with Front to The Day Today, the television version of On the Hour. Working on The Day Today was Patrick Marber, who was part of the 1984 Oxford University revue with Front and David Schneider, and who took part in the 1985 revue. This cast continued to contribute to the Alan Partridge comedy canon throughout the 1990s.

In 1994, Front was the first guest on Alan Partridge (Steve Coogan)'s chat show Knowing Me, Knowing You. She played the role of Sue Lewis, a show jumper. She later played a different character in each episode.

=== 2000s ===
Throughout the 2000s, Front also became a fixture on comedy panel shows on British television and radio including The News Quiz, Have I Got News for You and If I Ruled The World. She has also had minor roles in The Smell of Reeves and Mortimer, Absolute Power and Absolutely Fabulous and she has also played straight acting roles in television drama, including You Can Choose Your Friends, The Rotters' Club, Kavanagh QC, Lewis and Jonathan Creek.

In 2003, Front was listed in The Observer as one of the 50 funniest acts in British comedy.

In 2004 (series one) and 2005 (series two), Front starred in Julia Davis' Nighty Night. She played Cathy, who has MS and a neglectful husband, Don.

From 2006, Front has written columns for The Guardian.

In 2007, Front guest-starred in the Doctor Who audio drama The Mind's Eye. She was later in an episode of Doctor Who, The Zygon Invasion, with The Thick of It co-star Peter Capaldi.

Between 2006 until 2014, Front had a recurring role as Chief Superintendent Jean Innocent on the detective drama series Lewis, the successor to Inspector Morse on ITV.

In 2009 and 2012, Front starred in the third and fourth series of political satire The Thick of It. She playing Nicola Murray MP, Secretary of State for Citizenship and Social Affairs and in charge of the dysfunctional Department of Social Affairs and Citizenship (DoSAC), and later, Leader of the Opposition.

Front featured in the 2010 BBC comedy series Grandma's House playing the part of Simon Amstell's mother Tanya, and Just William, as the mother of William Brown and also starred in the 2011 live-action 3D family comedy film Horrid Henry: The Movie as Henry's headmistress, Miss Oddbod.

In 2012, Front starred as the psychiatrist in the Sky Arts sketch series Psychobitches, where Front's character offers therapy to notable women of history and the present day, including Anne Boleyn, Mary Queen of Scots, Mary Shelley, Enid Blyton, Eva Braun, Mary Pickford, Edith Piaf, and Anna Nicole Smith. The series aired on the British television channel Sky Arts 1. The first episode of a second series was broadcast on 25 November 2014.

In 2013, Front starred in the new Sky Living comedy The Spa, in the role of Alison Crabbe.

Front plays Cox in The Wrong Mans, a six-part comedy-thriller for BBC Two. The premiere was on 24 September 2013. She reprised this role in December 2014 for a special two-parter.

Front narrated Fox Wars which was broadcast on 22 October 2013.

In December 2013, Sky Atlantic aired a new comedy series called Little Cracker. The second programme in the series was an autobiographical story written by Front and her brother Jeremy. It concerns the time she witnessed the near-drowning of her father in a lake; that incident was closely followed by the death of her grandfather. The proximity of these two experiences caused Front considerable personal anguish. Front was eleven years old at the time and, because of the trauma she suffered, she went through a period of not wanting to attend school. The programme included a comedic treatment of this time in her life, followed by Front and her brother explaining the background to the story, and how they came to write and dramatise it. In the programme, Front was played by Lucy Hutchinson, and her father was played by the actor Richard Lumsden. Samantha Spiro played her mother and Front played her headmistress, Miss Dyson. Front's school friend character, Karen, was played by Imogen Front.

For their 2013 Christmas season, the BBC commissioned Death Comes to Pemberley, a three-part television drama based on the novel by P. D. James. The story returns to the world of Jane Austen's Pride and Prejudice, and involves its characters in a new tale of murder and emotional mayhem. Front played the part of Mrs Bennet. The first episode aired on BBC One at 8.15pm on Boxing Day.

In January 2014, Front appeared in the Midsomer Murders episode "Let Us Prey", about a serial killer who uses medieval torture methods to dispatch their victims. She appeared in the BBC series Outnumbered, playing the headmistress at Karen's school in early 2014.

Front portrayed Fiona in the BBC Radio 4 series Love in Recovery. She also starred in the sitcom Up the Women as Helen Bute, the antagonist for three episodes in mid-2013 and a six-episode series in 2015. From 2014 to 2019, she narrated the Channel 4 series The Supervet.

In 2017, she co-wrote and appeared in the sitcom Shush! on BBC Radio 4, a sitcom set in a library.

== Personal life ==
Front is married to Phil Clymer, previously a radio producer at the BBC World Service; they have two children. Front was part of the BBC English/World Service rep company.

Front's book Curious: True Stories and Loose Connections (published 2014) is a collection of autobiographical stories. A second book, Impossible Things Before Breakfast: Adventures in the Ordinary (published 2018), is a collection of true stories about surprising turns of events, bizarre misunderstandings and improbable life lessons. Jeremy Front, her brother, is a writer and comic actor. They have collaborated on writing and performance projects. The most recent is a series of spoof documentaries, Incredible Women, for BBC Radio 4.

== Filmography ==
Key
†	Denotes projects that have not yet been released

=== Film ===
Year	Title	Role	Notes	Ref.
1995	England, My England	Mary II		
1996	The Office	Pru	TV film	
1996	Never Mind the Horrocks	Various roles	TV film	
1996	Company	Sarah	TV film	
1997	The Missing Postman	Sarah Seymour	TV film	
2002	Promise Land		Short film	
2003	George Orwell: A Life in Pictures	Jura Interviewer	TV film	
2004	Suzie Gold	Barbara Gold		
2005	Colour Me Kubrick	Maureen		
2006	This Is Genius: Lucas Wilson III	Guinevere Wilson	TV film	
2007	You Can Choose Your Friends	Amanda Snell	TV film	
2007	Giles Wemmbley-Hogg Goes Off.... to Glastonbury	Narrator	TV film	
2008	Shush	Alice	TV film	
2009	Planet 51	Various roles	Voice only	
2011	Horrid Henry: The Movie	Ms Oddbod		
2015	The Eichmann Show	Mrs. Landau	TV film	
2015	Valentina's Dream	Valentina Tereshkova	Short film	
2016	Billionaire Boy	Miss Sharp	TV film	
2016	Grimsby	Lady at Worldcure Event		
2017	Comic Relief Hecklers Anonymous	Martha Hopkins	TV film	
2017	Transformers: The Last Knight	Aunt Marie		
2017	Edmund the Magnificent	Shopkeeper	Short film	
2018	Down a Dark Hall	Mrs. Olonsky		
2019	The Aeronauts	Aunt Frances		
2020	Marionette	Maureen		
2021	Hitman's Wife's Bodyguard	Therapist		
2022	Batgirl	—N/a	Cancelled	

=== Television ===
Year	Title	Role	Notes	Ref.
1990	Up Yer News		TV short	
1991	Tricky Business	Debbie	Recurring role; 3 episodes	
1992	Dizzy Heights		Recurring role; 2 episodes	
1993	Saturday Zoo	Various roles	Series 1, Episode 2	
1993	Noel's House Party	TV Assistant	Series 2, Episode 16	
1993	The Smell of Reeves and Mortimer	Suzanne	Episode: "Water"	
1994	Paris	Madame Trombaut	Episode: "Les Gimmiques"	
1994	The Day Today	Various roles	Series regular, 7 episodes	
1994–95	Knowing Me Knowing You with Alan Partridge	Various roles	Series regular; 8 episodes	
1995	Absolutely Fabulous	Cherysh	Episode: "Happy New Year"	
1995	Coogan's Run	WPC Cathy Briggs	Episode: "Natural Born Quizzers"	
1995–96	Fist of Fun	Various roles	Recurring role; 4 episodes	
1996–97	Roger and the Rottentrolls	Rottentroll	Recurring role; 9 episodes	
1997	Have Your Cake and Eat It	Claire Gray	Miniseries; 4 episodes	
1998	In the Red	Beth Parsons	Miniseries; 3 episodes	
1998–99	Kavanagh QC	Cathy Winslow	Recurring role; 4 episodes	
1998–2000	Stressed Eric	Liz	Series regular; 13 episodes	
1999	Sermon from St. Albion's	Cherie Blair	Series 2, Episode 1	
1999	People Like Us	Nicola Broadbent	Episode: "The Solicitor"	
1999	Jonathan Creek	Heidi	Episode; "The Eyes of Tiresias"	
2000–02	Time Gentlemen Please	Vicky Jackson	Series regular; 31 episodes	
2002	Big Train	Various roles	Series regular; 6 episodes	
2002	I'm Alan Partridge	Tessa McPherson	Episode: "Alan Wide Shut"	
2003	Eyes Down	Marjorie	Episode: "The Clairvoyant"	
2003	Monkey Dust	Various roles	Series 2, Episode 2	
2003	Absolute Power	Joanne Standing	Episode: "Tory Women"	
2004–05	Nighty Night	Cathy Cole	Series regular; 2 series; 12 episodes	
2004–06	The Catherine Tate Show	Narrator	Recurring role; 9 episodes	
2005	The Rotters' Club	Sheila Trotter	Miniseries; 3 episodes	
2005	Monkey Trousers	Various roles	Series 1, Episode 2	
2005	The Comic Strip Present...	Carol	Episode: "Sex Actually"	
2006–2014	Lewis	Chief Superintendent Jean Innocent	Series regular; 36 episodes	
2008	Love Soup	Catherine Sumpter	Episode: "Smoke and Shadows"	
2009	Al Murray's Multiple Personality Disorder	Chief Inspector	Series 1, Episode 1	
2009–2012	The Thick of It	Nicola Murray	Series regular; 13 episodes	
2010	Just William	Mrs. Brown	Series regular; 4 episodes	
2010–12	Grandma's House	Tanya	Series regular; 12 episodes	
2011	New Tricks	Bea Mackenna	Episode: "The Gentleman Vanishes"	
2011	Mr Blue Sky	Jacqui Easter	Recurring role; 4 episodes	
2012	Playhouse Presents	The Therapist	Episode: "Psychobitches"	
2012	Little Crackers	Miss Dyson	Episode: "Rebecca Front's Little Cracker: Rainy Days and Mondays"	
2012–14	Psychobitches	The Therapist	Series regular; 12 episodes	
2013	Agatha Christie's Poirot	Miss Brewis	Episode: "Dead Man's Folly"	
2013	The Spa	Alison	Series regular; 8 episodes	
2013	Death Comes to Pemberley	Mrs. Bennett	Miniseries; 2 episodes	
2013–14	The Wrong Mans	Cox	Recurring role; 5 episodes	
2013–15	Up the Women	Helen	Series regular; 9 episodes	
2014	Midsomer Murders	Reverend Martha Hillcott	Episode: "Let Us Prey"	
2014	Outnumbered	Mrs. Raynott	Episode: "Communication Skills"	
2015	Drunk History	Queen Victoria	Episode: King Henry VIII/Queen Victoria & Prince Albert/The Black Death	
2015	Mr. Bean: Funeral	Mourner	TV short	
2015	Humans	Vera	Series regular; 7 episodes	
2015	Doctor Who	Walsh	Episode: "The Zygon Invasion"	
2016	War & Peace	Anna Mikhaylovna Drubetskaya	Series regular; 6 episodes	
2016	Mid Morning Matters with Alan Partridge	Caller	Recurring role; 2 episodes	
2016	Doctor Thorne	Lady Arabella Gresham	Miniseries; 4 episodes	
2017	Queers	Alice	Episode: "Missing Alice"	
2017	Love, Lies and Records	Judy	Series regular; 6 episodes	
2017–2022	The Other One	Tess Walcott	Series regular; 9 episodes	
2018-19	Poldark	Lady Whitworth	Recurring role; 6 episodes	
2019	Death in Paradise	Fiona Tait	Episode: "Murder on the Honore Express"	
2019	Dark Money	Cheryl Denon	Miniseries; 4 episodes	
2020–22	Avenue 5	Karen Kelly	Series regular; 18 episodes	
2021	Grantchester	Reeny McArthur	Series 6, Episode 3	
2022	The Chelsea Detective	Diana Hopkinson	Episode: "The Gentle Giant"	
2025	The Hack	DAC Sue Akers		
2025	Midsomer Murders	Lady Myrtle Bruce	Episode: "Death Strikes Three"	
2026	The Fortune	Fiona Worrall	Miniseries; 4 episodes	
2026	Ludwig	Patricia Lowery	Series 2, Episode 1	

== Awards and nominations ==
Year	Award	Category	Work	Result	Ref.
2010	BAFTA TV Awards	Best Female Comedy Performance	The Thick of It	Won	
2010	Broadcasting Press Guild Awards	Best Actress	The Thick of It	Nominated	
2010	Golden Nymph Awards	Outstanding Actress - Comedy Series	The Thick of It	Nominated	
2012	British Comedy Awards	Best TV Comedy Actress	The Thick of It	Won	
2014	RTS Television Awards	Comedy Performance	Psychobitches	Nominated	
