= Emma Kennedy =

English actress (born 1967)

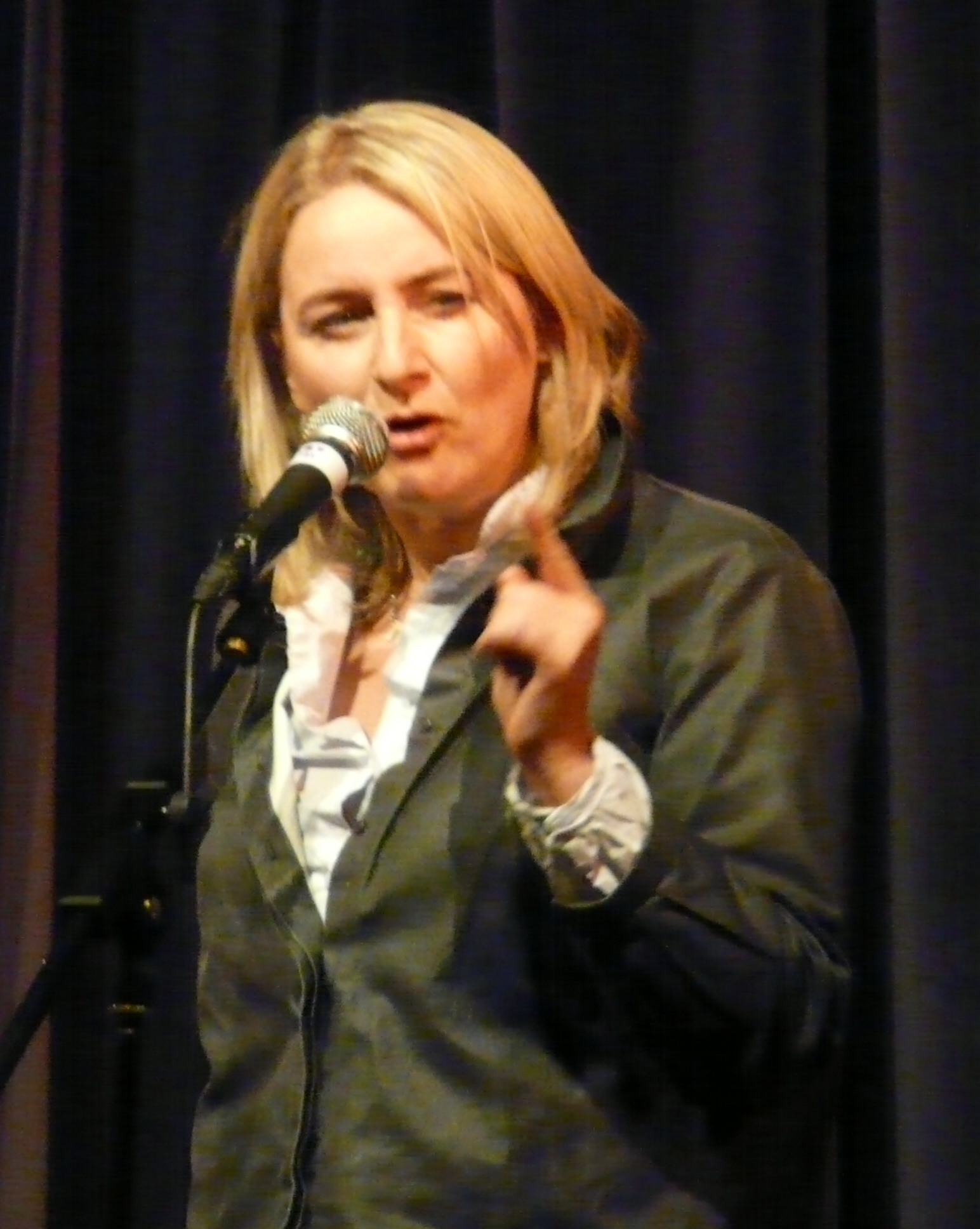
- TV's Emma Kennedy in 2011
- Born: Elizabeth Emma Williams; 28 May 1967 (age 59); Corby, Northamptonshire, England
- Education: Hitchin Girls' School; St Edmund Hall, Oxford
- Occupations: Actress, writer, comedian, lawyer, television presenter, author
- Political party: Liberal Democrats
- Spouse: Georgie Gibbon (m. 2015)

Elizabeth Emma Williams (born 28 May 1967), known professionally as Emma Kennedy, is an British/Irish actress, lawyer, comedian, travel writer, television presenter and author.

== Early life and education ==
The daughter of teachers, she was educated at Hitchin Girls' School, and St Edmund Hall, Oxford. At Oxford in 1987, she worked with (among others) Richard Herring and Stewart Lee in comedy troupes the Seven Raymonds and The Oxford Revue. After graduating she trained and practised as a solicitor, including work in corporate law, human rights law, and intellectual property law.

== Acting career ==
Kennedy first met close friend Mel Giedroyc, who was appearing with the Cambridge Footlights, at the Edinburgh Festival in 1988. Later she became a script editor for Giedroyc's double act with Sue Perkins, and worked as a writer for the Mel and Sue series Late Lunch. Kennedy presented the last series of The Real Holiday Show on Channel 4 in 2000.

She has since made appearances in TV comedies Goodness Gracious Me, This Morning With Richard Not Judy, Jonathan Creek, People Like Us, the BBC comedy The Smoking Room, along with appearing in several of The Mark Steel Lectures, as well as in several plays and radio shows. She was also a movie reviewer on Five's Terry and Gaby Show. In addition to this, she has made several appearances on Big Brother's Little Brother.

She has appeared in comedy shows on BBC Radio 4. Among these were The Sunday Format (a parody of Sunday newspaper supplements in which she played characters including an effete lifestyle writer India Spagoe) and Think the Unthinkable. She provided voices for The Comic Side of 7 Days and was a regular on the BBC Radio 2 comedy That Was Then, This Is Now with Richard Herring. She had a minor role in the film Notes on a Scandal and also appeared in the Five series Suburban Shootout and Suburban Shootout 2: Clackers at Dawn. She appeared as a regular on the podcast As It Occurs To Me until June 2011, when the series ended. Active in Comic Relief she was involved in setting up the kazoo orchestra concert at the Royal Albert Hall, on 14 March 2011, which broke the Guinness World Record for the largest such ensemble. She also acts the voice of Becky Butters on the CBBC programme Strange Hill High, a series that utilised Japanese vinyl puppets and CGI; that programme was in production during 2013 and 2014. In July 2012, she posed for Tatler in their "Out and Proud - Seven of London's smartest and loveliest lesbians" photoshoot. She also appeared in an episode of BBC comedy Not Going Out.

She has also appeared in television advertisements for products including Heat magazine, Sainsbury's supermarkets, Actimel probiotic drink, TV show Five Steps to a New You (Living TV) and Utterly Butterly (spread).

== Writing career ==
Kennedy has written for radio, television and the theatre. Her first book, How to Bring Up Your Parents, loosely based on her blog, came out in August 2007. Her second book, The Tent, The Bucket and Me, recounting her childhood camping experiences, was published in April 2009. This was adapted by Kennedy as writer of the six-part BBC TV series The Kennedys, starring Katherine Parkinson, Dan Skinner, Harry Peacock and Emma Pierson, first broadcast on 2 October 2015. The comedy centres on a family living in Stevenage New Town in the 1970s, "when suburbia discovered sophistication". Her latest memoir, Letters from Brenda, was published in May 2022.

Kennedy has also written children's books. Three books in the Wilma Tenderfoot series have appeared: Wilma Tenderfoot and the Case of the Frozen Hearts (published July 2009), Wilma Tenderfoot and the Case of the Putrid Poison (July 2010) and Wilma Tenderfoot and the Case of the Fatal Phantom (November 2010). I Left My Tent In San Francisco, the follow-up to The Tent, The Bucket and Me, appeared in May 2011.

She has also written a guide to TV series The Killing.

== Cookery ==
Kennedy took part in Celebrity MasterChef in 2012, winning the final after a week of cookery-based tasks, in which ex-footballer Danny Mills and TV presenter Michael Underwood also participated.

== Other television ==
Between 2001 and 2003, she narrated the Channel 4 house relocation property series Home from Home. In Autumn 2020 Emma was a member of the Walruses in Series 16 of the BBC Two quiz show Only Connect alongside musical satirist Mitch Benn and Mastermind finalist Dan Adler. Her team reached the quarter-final round, but were eliminated in the 17th episode of the series broadcast on 11 January 2021.

== Politics ==
Kennedy has been a member of the Liberal Democrats since 2010, becoming increasingly politically active by the end of the decade, using her Twitter account to express opposition to Brexit. In September 2019, she stood in hustings to be the Liberal Democrat Parliamentary candidate for Surrey Heath, coming second (by three votes) to Alasdair Pinkerton. Kennedy is a member of Chobham parish council as of May 2021.

== Personal life ==
On 20 January 2014, Kennedy announced her engagement to girlfriend Georgie Gibbon on Twitter. They were married on 25 July 2015.

== Published works ==
- Kennedy, Emma (12 September 2023). Letters from Brenda. Hodder & Stoughton. ISBN 978-1-5293-7200-7.
- Kennedy, Emma (1 January 2021). The Never-Ending Summer. Arrow Books. ISBN 978-1-7874-6329-5.
- Kennedy, Emma (1 August 2019). The Things We Left Unsaid. Century. ISBN 978-1-4735-6853-2.
- Kennedy, Emma (1 September 2015). Shoes for Anthony. Ebury Press. ISBN 978-0-09-195143-6.
- Kennedy, Emma (1 November 2012). The Killing Handbook. HarperCollins Publishers. ISBN 9781409145592.
- Kennedy, Emma (1 January 2011). Wilma Tenderfoot and the Case of the Rascal's Revenge. Macmillan Children's Books. ISBN 978-0-330-53523-6.
- Kennedy, Emma (5 May 2011). I Left My Tent in San Francisco. Ebury Press. ISBN 978-0-09-193595-5.
- Kennedy, Emma (1 December 2010). Wilma Tenderfoot and the Case of the Fatal Phantom. Macmillan Children's Books. ISBN 978-0-330-46953-1.
- Kennedy, Emma (2 August 2010). Wilma Tenderfoot and the Case of the Putrid Poison. Macmillan Children's Books. ISBN 978-0-330-46952-4.
- Kennedy, Emma (15 September 2011). Wilma Tenderfoot and the Case of the Frozen Hearts. Penguin Young Readers Group. ISBN 978-1-101-47544-7.
- Kennedy, Emma (29 April 2010). The Tent, The Bucket and Me. Ebury Press. ISBN 978-0-09-192679-3.
- Kennedy, Emma (20 July 2007). How to Bring Up Your Parents. The Friday Project. ISBN 978-1-905548-57-6.
