= Nine Lessons and Carols for Godless People =

2008 Christmas stage show

Nine Lessons and Carols for Godless People is a Christmas stage show celebrating a view of science. It was first run in 2008 at the Bloomsbury Theatre and re-run as The Return of Nine Lessons and Carols for Godless People in 2009, then televised on BBC Four as Nerdstock: 9 Lessons and Carols for Godless People.

It was initially organised by the Rationalist Association and the journal New Humanist. It is now produced by Trunkman Productions and is part of The Cosmic Shambles Network and in 2018 changed titles to become Nine Lessons and Carols for Curious People.

It was described by the host, Robin Ince: "If the Royal Variety Show was put in a matter transportation machine with the Royal Institution Christmas lectures, this is what you'd get".

== History ==
The first performance of Nine Lessons and Carols for Godless People took place in 2008 at the Bloomsbury Theatre. It derived its name from the seasonal Christian musical service Nine Lessons and Carols and was presented as a secularist alternative to the traditional religious celebrations of Christmas.

After several annual events, the show took a break for four years, returning in 2017. In 2018, Ince changed the show's title to Nine Lessons and Carols for Curious People so that people would not feel that they were "excluded because they had religion".

== Performances ==
=== 2008: Nine Lessons and Carols for Godless People ===
The 2008 event was staged at the Bloomsbury Theatre, with a second date being added, and a third at the Hammersmith Apollo.

Acts include Richard Dawkins, Dara Ó Briain, Philip Jeays, Malcolm Middleton, Jarvis Cocker, Darren Hayman, Luke Haines, Stewart Lee, Simon Singh, Isy Suttie, Gavin Osborn, Mark Thomas, Joanna Neary, Chris Addison, Ricky Gervais, Josie Long, Ben Goldacre and Tim Minchin.

=== 2009: The Return of... ===
The 2009 show was performed at the Bloomsbury Theatre from 15 to 19 December 2009, and at the Hammersmith Apollo on 20 December 2009. The Apollo show was also broadcast in part on BBC Four, produced by Kaye Godleman. Part of proceeds go to Mustard Seed secular school in Uganda.

The live music was provided by the Mystery Fax Machine Orchestra.

The presenter was Robin Ince. The participants shown in the BBC broadcast were Brian Cox, Mark Steel, Shappi Khorsandi, Richard Dawkins, Jim Bob, Simon Singh, Baba Brinkman, Ben Goldacre, Robyn Hitchcock, Richard Herring, Barry Cryer and Ronnie Golden

=== 2010: Ten Lessons... ===
The show returned for a third year in 2010 at the Bloomsbury Theatre. An audio recording of the show was produced by Go Faster Stripe during 15 December 2010 show.

=== 2011: Nine Lessons... ===
The show returned in 2011 and ran at London's Bloomsbury Theatre for six nights from 18 to 23 December.

The line up included Robin Ince (host) with Josie Long, Martin White, Helen Arney, Richard Herring and Matt Parker. They were joined by the following additional acts:

18th: Darren Hayman, Alex Bellos, Aleks Krotoski, Neil Hannon.
19th: Helen Keen, Mark Thomas, Darren Hayman, Alexei Sayle.
20th: Isy Suttie, Mark Thomas.
21st: Isy Suttie, Jim Bob.
22nd: Mark Miodownik, Jim Bob
23rd: Stewart Lee, Tim Harford.

=== 2012: Nine Lessons... ===
Robin Ince announced on Twitter in June 2012 that the show would return to London's Bloomsbury Theatre from 16 to 22 December 2012, with an additional show at the Hammersmith Apollo on 23 December.

16th: Richard Herring, Stewart Lee, Darren Hayman, Nick Doody, The Men That Will Not Be Blamed For Nothing, Jonny & The Baptists.
17th: Richard Herring, Isy Suttie, Tony Law, Darren Hayman, Frisky and Mannish, Kae Tempest, Nick Doody, Phil Hammond, Helen Arney.
18th: Richard Herring, Isy Suttie, Chris Addison, Tony Law, Jim Bob.
19th: Richard Herring, Isy Suttie, Chris Addison, Jim Bob, Alan Moore.
20th: Richard Herring, Nick Doody, Alan Moore.
22nd: Ian Stone, Phill Jupitus, Ben Goldacre, Mark Steel, Steve Jones, David McAlmont, Helen Keen, Jonny & The Baptists.
23rd: Tony Law, Ian Stone, Phill Jupitus, The Men That Will Not Be Blamed For Nothing, Steve Jones, Helen Keen, Jonny & The Baptists.

=== 2013: Nine Lessons... ===
In July 2013 Robin Ince announced a ten date run of Nine Lessons and Carols for Godless People. All ten dates featured: Robin Ince, Joanna Neary, George Egg, Josie Long (with the exception of the 11th), Grace Petrie and Steve Pretty's Origin of the Pieces. They were joined by:

10th: Matt Parker, Jonny & the Baptists, Helen Arney, Alex Horne, Mitch Benn, Emperor Yes, Suzi Gage
11th: Arnold Brown, Lee Mack, Marcus du Sautoy, John Hegley, Jonny & the Baptists, Matt Parker, Helen Keen
15th: Pappy's, Darren Hayman, Scroobius Pip, Matt Parker, Alexei Sayle, Norman Lovett, Gavin Osborn, Lucie Green, Aoife McLysagt
16th: Helen Czerski, Darren Hayman, Scroobius Pip, Jonny & the Baptists, Steve Mould, Gavin Osborn, Aoife McLysagt
17th: Mark Watson, Helen Czerski, Simon Watt, Steve Mould, Gavin Osborn, MJ Hibbett, Rich Herring
18th: Helen Czerski, Jim al Khalili, Steve Mould, Gavin Osborn, Rich Herring, John Lloyd, John Luke Roberts, Tim Harford
19th: Howard Read, Nick Doody, Helen Arney, Phil Jeays, Jim Al Khalili, Gavin Osborn, Francisco Diego, Andy White, MJ Hibbett, Milton Jones
20th: Howard Read, Nick Doody, Helen Arney, Phil Jeays, Shappi Khorsandi, Chris Neill, Richard Herring, Markus Birdman
21st: Howard Read, Sophie Scott, Phil Jeays, Mitch Benn, Sara Pascoe, Helen Keen, Ian Stone, Steve Backshall, Bridget Christie
22nd: Howard Read, Sophie Scott, Phil Jeays, Mitch Benn, Sara Pascoe, Stuart Black, Tiff Stephenson, Helen Keen, Ian Stone, Chris Neill, Marcus Brigstocke

=== 2014: Robin Ince's Christmas Science Ghosts ===
Ince changed the formula of the normal Nine Lessons format with five nights of "comedy, music, nonsense (and quite possibly Judge Dredd)" in 2014 with five nights of science and comedy with the theme of A Christmas Carol.

The line-up for those days featured:

- 15 December – The Ghost of Christmas Past – a night of comedy, music and little lectures on the last 4000 years of civilisation. With Tony Law, Natalie Haynes, Joanna Neary, Josie Long, Mary Beard, Steve Pretty's Origin of the Pieces orchestra, George Egg, Grace Petrie and Baba Brinkman.
- 16 & 17 December – The Ghost of Christmas Yet To Come. Professor Steve Jones, Stewart Lee, Professor Jon Butterworth, Joanne Neary, Ben Goldacre, Josie Long, Robin Ince, Steve Pretty's Origin of the Pieces band, Lewis Dartnell, Vessels, Helen Arney, Matt Parker, George Egg, Grace Petrie, Helen Keen, Scroobius Pip, Michael Conterio, Sara Pascoe, Fran Scott, Baba Brinkman.
- 20 & 21 December – The Ghost of Christmas Present. Josie Long, Joanna Neary, Ben Goldacre, Stewart Lee, Steve Pretty's Origin of the Pieces orchestra, Helen Arney, Matt Parker, Steve Aylett, Matthew Cobb, Robin Ince, Helen Czerski, George Egg, Grace Petrie, Scroobius Pip, Sara Pascoe, Baba Brinkman.

=== 2017: Nine Lessons... ===
On 14 September 2017, Robin Ince announced that the show would return after a four-year hiatus at Conway Hall in Holborn for four nights (16, 19, 20 and 22 December).

Each night compered by Robin Ince and featuring the following guest performers on these dates:

16th: Dr Helen Czerski, Prof Jon Butterworth, Helen Arney, Grace Petrie, Salena Godden, Michael Legge, Dr Kat Arney, Dr Katie Steckles, Dr Andrew Steele.
19th: Prof Jim Al-Khalili, Prof Lucie Green, Matt Parker, Hollie McNish, Grace Petrie, Prof Jon Butterworth, Dr Simon Watt, Dr Richard Vranch, Norman Lovett, Audrey Heartburn, Dr Jim Walsh.
20th: Josie Long, Prof Lucie Green, Prof Sophie Scott, Matt Parker, John Luke Roberts, George Egg, Grace Petrie, Ginny Smith, Dr Jamie Gallagher, Seb Lee-Delisle, Matt Stellingwerf.
22nd: Josie Long, Dr Helen Czerski, Prof Mark Miodownik, Steve Mould, Prof Bruce Hood, Dr Suzi Gage, Michael Legge, Jim Moray, Ginny Smith, Dr Andrew Steele.

=== 2018: Nine Lessons and Carols for Curious People ===
The show changed its title for the 2018 edition and took place at Kings Place in central London for four nights (14, 15, 29 and 20 December).

Each night was MC'd by Robin Ince and featured the following guest performers on these dates:

14th: Dr Hannah Fry, Dr Adam Rutherford, Ginny Smith, Dallas Campbell, Rautio Piano Trio, Gecko, Dr Brenna Hassett, Matt Watson, Ben Moor, Dr Hannah Critchlow, Jo Neary, Philip Ball, Dr Andrew Steele, George Egg, Dunja Lavrova, Will Bartlett.
15th: Prof Chris Lintott, Prof Suzanne Imber, Femi & Marco, Dr Hannah Fry, Dr Adam Rutherford, She Makes War, Dr Dean Burnett, Dr Suzi Gage, Octavia Poetry Collective, Steve Pretty, Miranda Lowe, Jim Moray, Jo Neary, Prof Sophie Scott, George Egg, Dr Richard Vranch, Will Bartlett, Alice Pratley.
19th: Josie Long, Prof Lucie Green, Dr Ben Goldacre, Matt Parker, Grace Petrie, Seb Lee-Delisle, Joshua Idehen, Prof Monica Grady, Dr Karl Kruszelnicki, Jonny and the Baptists, Dr Cheryl Patrick, Zoe Griffiths, Prof Mark Miodownik, Helen Arney, Bec Hill, Spencer Kelly, Dunja Lavrova, Will Bartlett.
20th: Dr Helen Czerski, Prof Lucie Green, Matt Parker, Grace Petrie, Dr Karl Kruszelnicki, Ronnie Le Drew, Zippy, Dr Lucy Rogers, Prof Jon Butterworth, Dr Jennifer Rogers, Jonny Berliner, Tiernan Douieb, Chris Stokes, Simon Watt, Dr Katie Steckles, Peter Buckley Hill, Helen Zaltzman, Martin Austwick, Dunja Lavrova, Will Bartlett.

=== 2019: Nine Lessons and Carols for Curious People ===
The 2019 show ran for two performances at The Lowry in Salford, and five at Kings Place in London.

==== November ====
29th: Dr Helen Czerski, Prof Matthew Cobb, Matt Parker, Prof Jeff Forshaw, Prof Lucie Green, Prof Dan Davis, Smitten, Prof Nav Kapur, Dr Katie Steckles, Dr Laura Tisdall, Matt Watson

30th: Prof Tim O’Brien, Dr Helen Czerski, Dr Suzi Gage, Prof Lucie Green, Matt Parker, Jim Moray, Keisha Thompson, Jasmine Kennedy, Foxdog Studios, Prof Sheena Cruickshank, Michael Marshall, Dr Aravind Vijayaraghavan, Prof Jen Rogers

==== December ====
12th: Dr Simon Singh, Prof Lucie Green, Matt Parker, Helen Arney, Ginny Smith, Seb Lee Delisle, Jo Neary, Joshua Idehen, Dr Susie Maidment, James Nokise, Prof Andrea Sella, Steve Pretty, Matt Stellingwerf, Dave Coplin, Dr Andrew Steele, Dr Linda Cremonesi, Matt Watson

13th: Liz Bonnin, Dr Helen Czerski, Prof Lucie Green, Prof Claudia Hammond, Matt Parker, Dr Dean Burnett, Femi & Marco, Dr Becky Smethurst, Jo Neary, Prof Andrea Sella, Prof Chris Jackson, Natalie Haynes, 1201_Alarm, Chris Stokes, Gecko, Dr Michelle Dickinson, Reece Shearsmith

15th: Bec Hill, Konnie Huq, Steve Mould, Dr Michelle Dickinson, Dr Dean Burnett, Ginny Smith, Dr Jackie Bell

19th: Josie Long, Prof Jim Al-Khalili, Prof Jon Butterworth, Dr Brenna Hassett, Jonny & The Baptists, George Egg, Ariane Sherine, Steve Mould, Michael Legge, Anna Ploszajski, Dr Jess Wade, Dr Jen Gupta, Dr Pete Etchells, Jonny Berliner, Vijay Shah, Colour Me Wednesday, Zoe Griffiths

21st: Prof Chris Lintott, Dr Helen Czerski, Josie Long, Dr Lucy Rogers, Dr Karl Kruszelnicki, Angela Saini, Bec Hill, Nikesh Shukla, George Egg, She Makes War, Steve Pretty, Jonny and the Baptists, Eugénie von Tunzelmann, Miranda Lowe, Dr Suzi Gage, Dr Jenny Rohn, Pope Lonergan
