= They're Moving Father's Grave to Build a Sewer =

Song
- Written: 1900
- Genre: Novelty song

"They're Moving Father's Grave to Build a Sewer" (Roud 10391) is a classic comic song, often assumed to be from the music hall tradition. It is usually sung in a straight key of C major, but can be varied.

== History ==
The song is first mentioned in The Mansfield News (15 April 1900), saying "a well known sporting editor in town has written quite a pathetic little ballad, entitled 'They Have Shifted Mother's Grave to Build a Sewer', and it is expected to become quite popular". It was advertised in the Great Falls Leader in May that year, saying: "The two latest songs are said to be 'They Shifted Mother's Grave to Build a Sewer', and 'They Have Painted Papa's Whiskers Green to Match His Pants'. For Sale by all newsdealers." In August, the Wilkes-Barre Sunday Morning Leader had an anecdote that a woman (Mrs. Frederick Wallace) recognised the face of her "long lost brother" from a lithograph of the composer "on the cover of a beautiful musical composition rejoicing in the delightful title of, 'They Have Shifted Mother's Grave to Build a Sewer'", and managed to reconnect with him as a result.

However, the song was soon attributed to others. In September 1900, the Cincinnati Commercial Tribune credited the song to famous singer and songwriter Paul Dresser, when discussing the Brooklyn Superbas baseball team, saying: "For a mascot the Brooklyns carry a boy soprano named Casey. With weepful pathos he sings Paul Dresser's latest success, entitled 'They're Moving Mother's Grave to Build a Sewer'." In December that year, The Scranton Times and The Scranton Tribune attributed "They Shifted Willie's Grave to Build a Sewer" to "Tontine". In 1904, the East Liverpool, Ohio Evening News Review described how "Willie Powell warbled a very touching and Original Ballad entitled, 'They Are Moving Willie's Grave to Build a Sewer'" during a banquet for the Manchester basketball team who had won the Ohio championships.

The Altoona Mirror for 15 April 1901, described the songs played by "street piano music venders" in Altoona, Pennsylvania, which included "They Be Moving Mother's Grave to Build a Sewer". Other early versions include "They've Shifted Mother's Grave to Dig a Sewer" (1900), "They Have Shifted Little Willie's Grave to Build a Sewer" sung in 1902 by vaudeville performer Arthur Deming in Indianapolis, and "We Had to Move Paddy's Grave to Dig a Sewer" sung at a 1903 meeting of the Brotherhood of Boiler Makers and Iron Ship Builders in Sacramento, California.

"They Are Moving Grandpa's Grave to Build a Sewer" was listed as a phrase by H. L. Mencken, derived from the title of the song. Dorothy Kilgallen also mentioned it in a 1947 article about sayings: "the comic sayings were ever popular. One of the most famous usually painted on beer steins, was 'They Are Moving Grandpa's Grave to Build a Sewer'. It didn't make much sense but the folks of the eighties loved it."

It was a favourite of Frank Muir, who sang it many times on BBC Radio 4. Denis Norden also sang the song in the final series of radio panel show My Music (1994).

A version of the song was also recorded by Oscar Brand, on his album Bawdy Songs Goes to College recorded in 1955, under the title "Father's Grave".

A variant of the song, called "Grandpa's Grave", was recorded by the comedian Peter Sellers and included on his 1960 LP with Sophia Loren, Peter & Sophia, as well as on the B-side of the duo's hit single "Goodness Gracious Me".

The song was repopularised by the Clancy Brothers, who included it on their 1965 album Recorded Live in Ireland.

Charles Keeping sang this song for the record version of his 1975 book Cockney Ding Dong.

The Men That Will Not Be Blamed for Nothing recorded a version called "Sewer (Live)" for their 2010 album Now That's What I Call Steampunk! Volume 1. A limited edition of this album included a phonograph cylinder of this track; the first music commercially available on wax cylinder for almost a century.

== Lyrics ==
Lyrics vary, but Muir's version is thus:

They're moving Father's grave to build a sewer
They're moving it regardless of expense.
They're taking his remains, to put in nine-inch drains
And provide the public with a nice new gent's.
It's such a lovely place behind the gasworks
With dandelions growing by the fence:
Now it seems a wicked plot
To spoil that lovely spot
Just for one old rich man's convenience.

— Frank Muir, A Kentish Lad (October 2000)
