= Robin Ince =

English comedian and writer (born 1969)

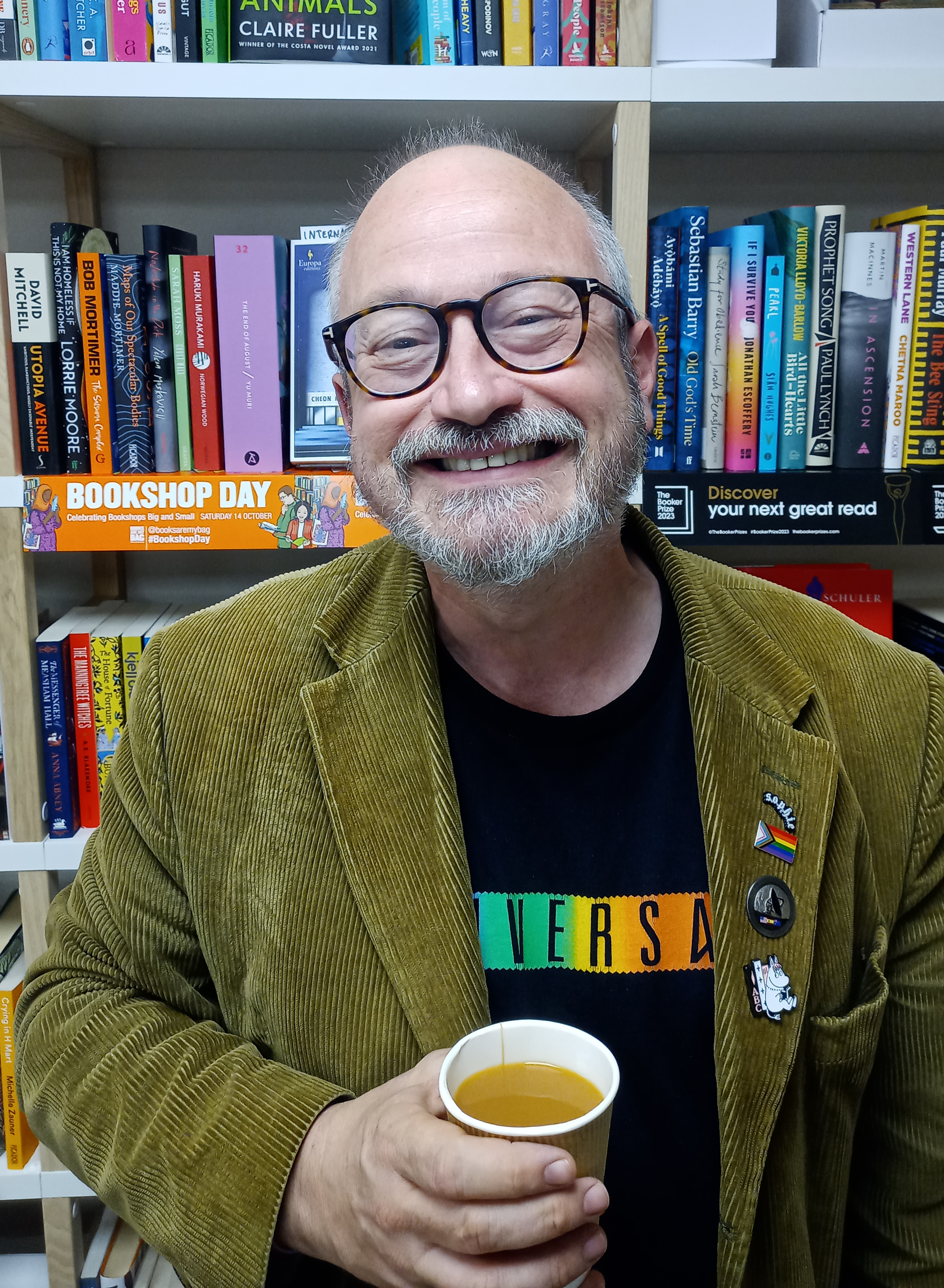
- Ince in 2023
- Born: Robin Ince; 20 February 1969 (age 57)
- Education: Cheltenham College; Royal Holloway, University of London (BA)
- Notable work: Book Club, The Infinite Monkey Cage, Nerdstock

Comedy career
- Years active: 1990–present
- Medium: Stand-up, television, radio
- Genres: Observational comedy, political satire
- Subjects: Science, literature, philosophy
- Robin Ince's voice Recorded October 2017
- Website: robinince.com

Robin Ince (born 20 February 1969) is an English comedian, actor and writer. He was a presenter of the BBC Radio 4 show The Infinite Monkey Cage with physicist Brian Cox from 2009 to 2025, creating Nine Lessons and Carols for Godless People, and co-founding the Cosmic Shambles Network.

== Education ==
Ince was privately educated at York House prep school, near Croxley Green in Hertfordshire, and Cheltenham College. He subsequently studied English and Drama at Royal Holloway, University of London graduating in 1991.

== Career ==
Ince has had a career in comedy, radio, broadcasting, television and live events.

=== Stand-up comedy ===
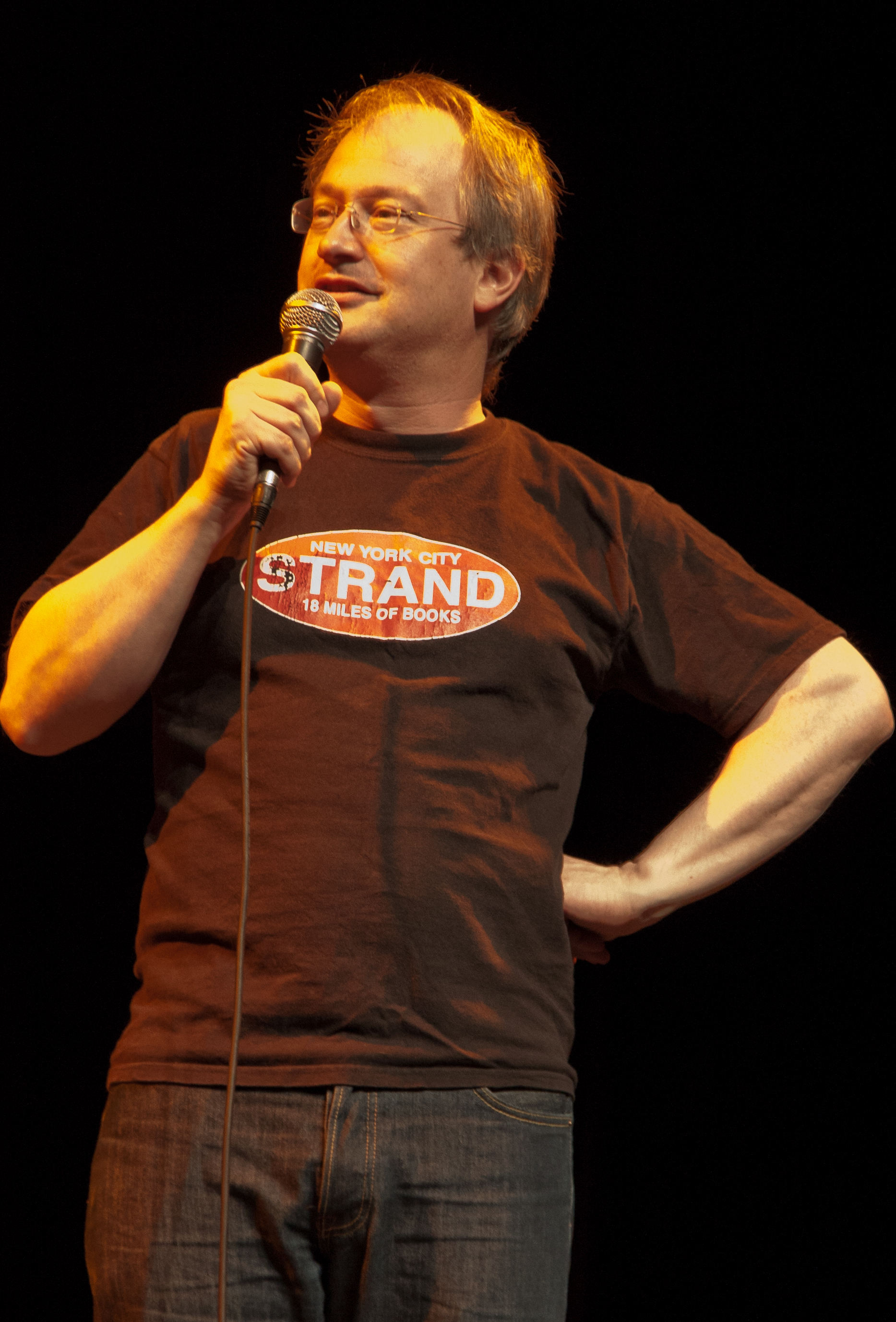
Ince in 2013

In 1990, Ince first appeared at Greyfriars Kirkhouse at the Edinburgh Festival where Eddie Izzard was running a venue. At the time Ince was performing in a play called 'Shadow Walker' by Trevor Maynard. He had appeared at the Cafe Royal as part of the Edinburgh Fringe show 'Rubbernecker' alongside Stephen Merchant, Jimmy Carr and Ricky Gervais in 2001.

As a friend of Ricky Gervais, Ince opened as a support act for his Politics tour in 2004 and his Fame tour in 2007. He also appears on the DVD and has often appeared in Gervais' video podcasts.

In 2008 Ince had a residency at the Dorchester Arts Centre, trying out new material for his upcoming shows. In late 2008 he released a live stand-up DVD entitled Robin Ince is as Dumb as You, released by Go Faster Stripe. Then between January and April 2009, Ince performed his UK tour Bleeding Heart Liberal, playing 51 dates. Towards the end of 2009 and into 2010, Ince toured his next show entitled Robin Ince vs. the Moral Majority. In 2011 he started on the road again, performing his 'Happiness Through Science' UK show, which continued to add many dates and was extended into 2012.

In September 2016, Ince performed at the Keep Corbyn rally in Brighton in support of Jeremy Corbyn's campaign in the Labour Party leadership election. Ince staged a stand-up tour, Pragmatic Insanity, in September 2017.

=== Live events ===
In 2005, Ince began running the Book Club night at The Albany, London, where acts were encouraged to perform turns of new and experimental material. The club got its name from Ince's attempts to read aloud from—and humorously criticise—various second-hand books which the audience and he had brought in for the occasion. The Book Club proved to be so successful that Ince took it on a full UK tour in 2006, the same year he won the Time Out Award for Outstanding Achievement in Comedy. In 2010, Ince published a book entitled Robin Ince's Bad Book Club about his favourite books that he has used for his shows.

Ince has curated Nine Lessons and Carols for Godless People (later renamed Nine Lessons and Carols for Curious People) since 2008, a Christmas stage show with performances from comedians, musicians and scientists.

=== Television ===
Ince started his television career as a comedy writer, working on The 11 O'Clock Show, for which he also performed as an impressionist, including an impersonation of John Peel. He also appeared in The Office as failed interviewee Stuart Foot.

The second Nine Lessons and Carols for Godless People stage show was screened on BBC Four in 2009, billed as Nerdstock: 9 Lessons and Carols for Godless People.

=== Radio ===
Ince co-starred with Mitch Benn and Alfie Joey in the BBC Radio 4 series Mitch Benn's Crimes Against Music.

In the summer of 2022 he presented a two-part BBC Radio 4 series, Robin Ince's Reality Tunnel, exploring the internal and external aspects of reality. This was an edited version of a live performance given in Hulme, Manchester in April 2022.

Ince and physicist Brian Cox presented the science series The Infinite Monkey Cage on Radio 4. The programme won a Gold Award in the Best Speech Programme category at the 2011 Sony Radio Awards.

In December 2025, Ince announced he had resigned as co-host of The Infinite Monkey Cage after 16 years. In his statement, he accused BBC executives of pressuring him to censor his views, including his criticism of Donald Trump and support for trans rights.

=== Books ===
- Normally Weird and Weirdly Normal: My Adventures in Neurodiversity
- Robin Ince's Bad Book Club: One man's quest to uncover the books that taste forgot
- I'm a Joke and So Are You: Reflections on Humour and Humanity
- The Importance of Being Interested – Adventures in Scientific Curiosity
- Bibliomaniac: An Obsessive's Tour of the Bookshops of Britain

With Brian Cox and Alexandra Feachem:

- The Infinite Monkey Cage – How to Build a Universe

=== Podcast and internet ===
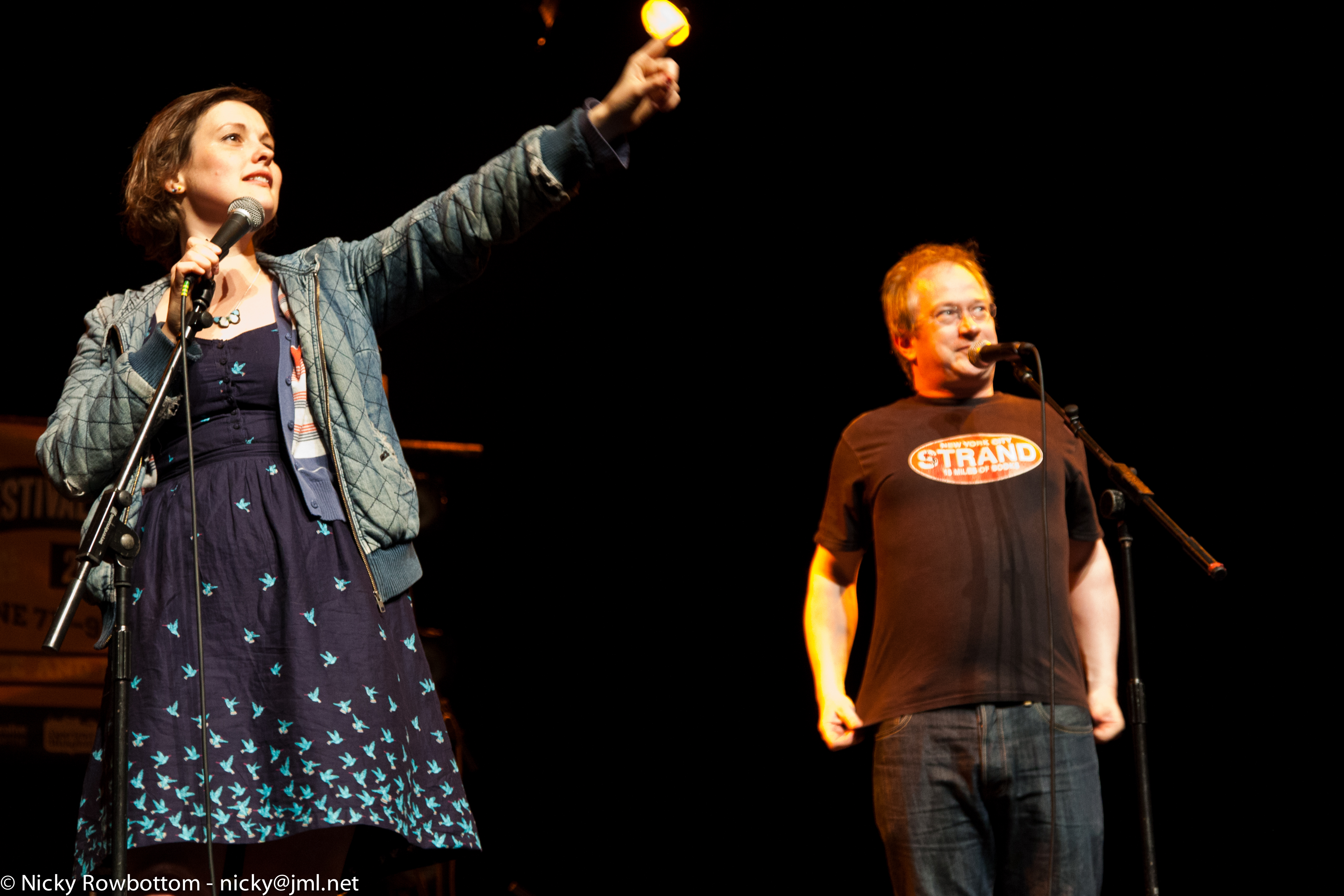
Josie Long and Robin Ince performing Utter Shambles at the 2013 Long Division Festival in Wakefield

Ince presented the Utter Shambles (previously Show & Tell) podcast for Paramount Comedy with Josie Long, and presented BBC Radio 4 Extra's Serious About Comedy from 2005 until its end in November 2007. Regular panellists in the show included Book Club performers Josie Long, Howard Read and Natalie Haynes, comedy critics Bruce Dessau and Stephen Armstrong, and many others from the British comedy industry. He now presents Book Shambles with Robin and Josie with Josie Long which is funded via Patreon and music podcast Vitriola with comedian Michael Legge.

In 2013, Ince co-created The Incomplete Map of the Cosmic Genome, an online video-based science magazine and archive, with Trent Burton. In 2017, Ince and Burton founded the Cosmic Shambles Network, an organisation that creates podcasts, documentaries and events and aims to be "a place where creativity and curiosity took centre stage". In 2025 the network hosted a "Cosmic Shambles Forest of Science and Culture" at the Latitude Festival.

=== Awards ===
- Chortle Awards – Innovation Award (2006)
- Time Out – Outstanding Contribution to Comedy (2006)
- Chortle Awards – Best Compere (2007)
- Chortle Awards – Innovation Award (2009)
- Ockham Award for Best Skeptic Event/Campaign (2012)
- Sony Radio Awards – Gold Award for Best Speech Programme (2011)
- Honorary Fellow - University College London (2014)
- Honorary Doctor of Science – Royal Holloway, University of London
- Distinguished Supporter of the British Humanist Association

=== Other appearances ===
Ince has appeared at several science events, including the line-up of UCL's Bright Club in both 2009 and 2010, and took part in the Cheltenham Science Festival in 2011 and 2014.

In 2026, he appeared in Melt It! The Film of the Iceman alongside Stewart Lee, Jo Brand and The Iceman.

=== Radio credits ===
- 2002–2004: Writer/performer, The In Crowd (BBC Radio 4)
- 2003–2004: Host, Spanking New (BBC Radio 7)
- 2003–2006: Writer/performer, The Day the Music Died (BBC Radio 2)
- 2003–2006: Writer/performer/Morrissey/John Peel/Satan, Mitch Benn's Crimes Against Music (BBC Radio 4)
- 2004: Performer, Think the Unthinkable (BBC Radio 4)
- 2004–2008: Performer, The Now Show (BBC Radio 4)
- 2005: Writer, Dead Ringers (BBC Radio 4)
- 2005: Host, Serious About Comedy (BBC Radio 7)
- 2006–2007: Panellist, The Personality Test (BBC Radio 4)
- 2008: Panellist, Just a Minute (BBC Radio 4)
- 2009: Guest, Geoff Lloyd's Hometime Show (Absolute Radio)
- 2009–2025: Host, "The Infinite Monkey Cage" (BBC Radio 4)
- 2010: Presenter "Schrodinger's Quantum Kittens" (BBC Radio 4)
- 2022: Writer/performer, Robin Ince's Reality Tunnel (BBC Radio 4)

=== Collections ===
The University of Kent holds material by Ince as part of the British Stand-Up Comedy Archive. The collection includes zines, material made in collaboration with Josie Long, set lists, promotional material and props.

== Personal life ==
Ince is an atheist and supports the Rationalist Association via New Humanist magazine by organising events at the Bloomsbury Theatre and at the Hammersmith Apollo featuring scientists, musicians and comedians. The first of these was Nine Lessons and Carols for Godless People in Christmas 2008, and more recently he has fronted a Night of 400 Billion Stars. Regular contributions come from Josie Long, Chris Addison, Ricky Gervais, Richard Dawkins, Simon Singh and Philip Jeays. In 2009, Ince organised two events with Josie Long, called Darwin's Birthday Spectacular, marking both the scientist's 200th birthday and the 150th anniversary of the publication of his book On the Origin of Species. He was appointed a patron of Humanists UK, and later of Dignity in Dying.

On 15 September 2010, Ince, along with 54 other public figures, signed an open letter published in The Guardian stating their opposition to Pope Benedict XVI's visit to the UK being a state visit.

Ince is married, has one son and has spoken publicly about being diagnosed with ADHD.
