= Jennifer Rogers (disambiguation) =

Jennifer Rogers may refer to:

- Jennifer Rogers, British statistician
- Jennifer Rogers (wrestler), American freestyle wrestler
- Jennifer Rogers, member of indie rock band The Rogers Sisters
- Jennifer Rogers, Conservative candidate in 1999 Bristol City Council election
- Jennifer Rogers (footballer), player for Liverpool Feds in 2018–19 FA Women's National League Cup
- Jennifer Rogers, wife of Fred Griffith (actor)
- Jennifer Rogers, wife of 30 Rock TV show producer Robert Carlock
- Jennifer Rogers, fictional character on TV episode St. Valentine's Day (30 Rock)
- Jennifer Rogers, fictional character played by Shirley MacLaine in 1955 film The Trouble With Harry
- Jennifer Rogers, fictional character in 1998 film Primary Colors
