= The Steampunk Album That Cannot Be Named for Legal Reasons =

The Steampunk Album! That Cannot Be Named for Legal Reasons

Studio album by The Men That Will Not Be Blamed for Nothing
- Released: 24 May 2010
- Recorded: Dropout Studios
- Genre: Steampunk
- Length: 29.29
- Label: Leather Apron

The Men That Will Not Be Blamed for Nothing chronology
The Steampunk Album! That Cannot Be Named for Legal Reasons (2010)	A Very Steampunk Christmas (2010)

The Steampunk Album That Cannot Be Named for Legal Reasons, originally known as Now That's What I Call Steampunk! Volume 1, is the first album by the English steampunk band The Men That Will Not Be Blamed for Nothing. The album was released by Leather Apron on CD and digital download and as a limited edition set containing one track on a phonographic wax cylinder. It is the first time a musical track has been released commercially as a wax cylinder in Britain since 1922. The album was renamed in January 2012, after EMI gave the band three days to change the title or face legal action.

== Production ==
The album was released commercially on 24 May 2010 on the band's own music label, Leather Apron, mainly as a CD and as a digital download. There was also a selection of limited edition boxsets which included phonographic wax cylinder records of individual tracks, created by Poppy Records. Now That's What I Call Steampunk! Volume 1 is the first official wax cylinder release by a British band since 1922. So far, 40 have been made, of which ten were reserved for the band. Each limited edition pack contains the full CD, the track "Sewer" recorded on the wax cylinder, a "lyrics newspaper", and a set of instructions on how to build a phonograph for less than £20 so that the cylinder can be played. The limited edition set is sold by Vagrants Among Ruins, the publishers of Steampunk Magazine.

The editor of Steampunk Magazine, Ms C. Allegra Hawksmoor, said that one of the reasons for creating the cylinders was that "Wax cylinders are one of the first forerunners of recording technology, they're a piece of history that has been lost in the ceaseless drive for progress, and it's really nice to be doing something to bring a little of that back." It is not yet known if more limited editions set will be made for Now That's What I Call Steampunk! Volume 1 or for any of the band's future albums. Hawksmoor claims that the idea for creating the wax cylinder was from the band member Andy Heintz.

== Musical styles and themes ==
The music in Now That's What I Call Steampunk! Volume 1 mainly has a steampunk theme, in that most of the music is based on the steampunk sci-fi genre and neo-Victorianism. The style of the music has been described as: "Part Victorian Music Hall, part punk rock, stuffed full of barbed pop hooks and with it's [sic] tongue firmly in it's [sic] cheek".

The songs include "Steph(v)enson", which is a song about four famous Victorians named either Stephenson or Stevenson: George Stephenson, Robert Stephenson, Robert Stevenson and Robert Louis Stevenson. "Moon" concerns a hot air balloon journey to the Moon with Jules Verne, H. G. Wells and Captain Nemo. "Goggles" is a song praising "hard-fighting women mechanics", referencing the steampunk fashion of wearing goggles. O'Neill claims that "'Goggles' is an explicitly feminist song." "Bedlam" is about people visiting the Bethlem Royal Hospital, a psychiatric hospital better known as the Bedlam. "etiquette" is about various rules concerning Victorian social behaviour and manners.

"Charlie" is about Charles Darwin and ironically mocks the Victorians' reception of his theory of evolution. "Sewer (live)" is a cover of the music hall standard "They're Moving Father's Grave to Build a Sewer", about graves being dug up to build new sewers. The recording of "Sewer" on the CD and download includes samples of a traditional English pub taken from a BBC sound effects CD, and uses digital technology to create the impression of an old live recording. The version of the song released on phonographic cylinder is a 'straight' recording without sound effects or digital manipulation. "A Traditional Victorian Gentlemens Boasting Song" is a song in which each of the band members performs an act of one-upmanship on each other. "Blood Red" is a satire on the way the British Empire expanded and exploited other countries' resources. The song features reconstructed extracts and a rendition of the traditional Welsh male voice choir song "Men of Harlech" from the film Zulu in the performance.

== Reception ==
Professional ratings
Review scores
Source	Rating
Big Cheese	4/5 stars
Rock Sound	8/10 stars

A reviewer in Steampunk Magazine said of the album: "For a long time, we have been waiting for a band that likes to mix a little punk into their Victoriana, and now, with the release of the Men's debut album Now That's What I Call Steampunk Volume 1, we finally have it. The album is filled with guitar-and-drum-driven cockney punk songs, complete with the musical saw and comedy lyrics that have made the Men notorious."

Freq described it as "the Victorian Wave of British Heavy Metal," referencing the new wave of British heavy metal. Rock Sound magazine awarded the album 8/10. Jim Sharples of Big Cheese magazine said that the album was "Outstanding".

== Track listing ==
1. "Etiquette" – 2:10
2. "Steph(v)enson" – 3:51
3. "Bedlam" – 2:56
4. "Goggles" – 2:30
5. "Sewer (Live)" – 2:15
6. "Boilerplate Daniel" – 2:09
7. "Moon" – 4:00
8. "A Traditional Victorian Gentlemens Boasting Song" – 2:14
9. "Victorian Grindcore" – 0:14
10. "Blood Red" – 4:17
11. "Charlie" – 2:58
