= Arts Emergency =

- Founded: 2011
- Founders: Josie Long, Neil Griffiths
- Purpose: Charity
- Location: London, Greater Manchester, Merseyside
- Region served: United Kingdom
- Co-CEO: Neil Griffiths
- Co-CEO: Lucy Newton
- Key people: 16 to 26-year-olds
- Employees: 18
- Volunteers: 10,000+
- Website: arts-emergency.org

Arts Emergency is a UK-based charity that seeks opportunities in the Arts and Humanities sector for underrepresented young people aged 16-26. The Charity describes itself as "a people-powered movement that opens doors for underrepresented young people so they can access and thrive in creativity and culture".

== History ==
Founded by campaigner Neil Griffiths (current co-CEO) and comedian Josie Long in 2011, Arts Emergency was created in response to the increasing tuition fees, abolition of public funding for the teaching of arts subjects in British universities and the lack of social mobility in the Arts, a belief reinforced by the 2015 Panic! survey initiated by Create London and the 2018 Panic! It's an Arts Emergency Report led by academics Dr Dave O'Brien, Dr Orian Brook, and Dr Mark Taylor from the Universities of Edinburgh and Sheffield. The Charity launched with an event at the Hackney Empire in the London borough that hosted its pilot project in 2012.

== Work ==
Arts Emergency runs a national "alternative" Old Boy Network that aims to create privilege for people without privilege, and tackle the inequalities that exist with access to arts degrees and careers in the sector. The Arts Emergency Network is made up of over 10,000 volunteers working in TV, film, music, art, fashion, academia, law, architecture, activism, comedy, journalism, publishing, design, activism and theatre.

The Charity works in three strands, offering connections, communities and collectives to the 2,000 young people it supports. Arts Emergency offers opportunities ranging from mentoring and coaching with industry professionals, work experience, and tickets to events, as well as opportunities to connect and collaborate with peers through social events, trips and assemblies. This assistance aims to help young people make informed decisions about the career they wish to pursue and develop an understanding of how they can do it.

Young people are able to access resources, advice and guidance through the volunteer network until they are 26 years old.

Supporters of the organisation include actors Julie Hesmondhalgh, Lolly Adefope and Mathew Baynton, comedians Joe Lycett, Chris Addison and Nish Kumar, author and journalist Yomi Adegoke and writers Sarah Perry and David Nicholls.

The organisation currently runs programmes in London, Greater Manchester and Merseyside as well as offering remote opportunities.
