= Jonny Donahoe =

British comedian, writer and performer

- Born: 15 June 1983 (age 43); Royal Tunbridge Wells
- Notable work: Jonny and the Baptists; Every Brilliant Thing
- Partner: Josie Long
- Children: 2

Jonny Donahoe (born 15 June 1983) is a British comedian, writer and performer. He is one half of the comedy band Jonny and the Baptists, with Paddy Gervers.

== Education ==
Donahoe was educated at Abingdon School from 1996 to 2001.

== Career ==
Donahoe is best known for his comedy band Jonny & the Baptists, a collaboration with Paddy Gervers, who have made several appearances on BBC Radio 4. He has toured internationally with the critically acclaimed Every Brilliant Thing, which he co-wrote with Duncan Macmillan, following a very successful off-Broadway run at the Barrow Street Theatre in New York City. In 2014/15 Donahoe was nominated for the Drama Desk Award for Outstanding Solo Performance and the Lucille Lortel Award for Outstanding Solo Show. Every Brilliant Thing was also filmed and screened on HBO in 2016.

In 2022 Donahoe took a solo show Forgiveness on tour.

== See also ==
- List of Old Abingdonians
