= The Day the Music Died (radio programme) =

- Genre: Comedy
- Running time: 30 mins
- Country of origin: United Kingdom
- Language: English
- Home station: BBC Radio 2
- Starring: Jon Holmes, Andrew Collins, Robin Ince
- Original release: 8 November 2003 – 18 August 2007
- No. of series: 6
- No. of episodes: 40

The Day the Music Died is a British topical music show radio comedy broadcast on BBC Radio 2. The show aired from 2003 to 2007. The sixth series in 2007 saw the departure of Robin Ince, leaving Jon Holmes and Andrew Collins to co-present.
