= Philip Jeays =

- Born: Philip Harris; 24 June 1962 (age 63)
- Origin: Taunton, Somerset, England
- Occupation: Musician
- Instruments: Vocals, guitar
- Years active: 1990–present
- Labels: Ditton Pye, Irregular
- Website: jeays.com

Philip Jeays (born Philip Harris on 24 June 1962) is an English singer-songwriter. He writes and performs songs in a style close to the tradition of French chanson but in the English language. His main influences are Belgian singer-songwriter Jacques Brel and English singer-songwriter and poet Jake Thackray. Writer Dave Thompson described him as "one of the most extraordinary singer/songwriters in recent British memory".

== Musical beginnings ==
After growing up in Somerset, East Sussex and London, he took an art foundation course and moved to the south of France for six months to paint. There he was introduced to the songs of Jacques Brel which inspired him to start writing songs himself. Back in England, he was taught to sing by his mother, who had trained as an opera singer at the Royal Academy of Music, started playing a guitar and then changed his name to Philip Jeays, after his maternal great-great-grandfather.

== Early performances ==
His first performance in 1985 at Hampton Wick Folk Club was well received. Due to nerves he did not perform again until 1989 when he took part in an acoustic and poetry club night in Clapham, London.

He releases his first recordings on cassette in 1990 and starts performing with guitarist Max Warner. This set up allowed him to 'perform' the songs more without the restraints of a holding a guitar. After a near fatal car crash in 1992, he recovered and continued to perform around various small clubs in London.

== The band ==
In 1995, he teamed up with guitarist and bass player William George Q and pianist David Harrod. The trio first performed at the Vortex Jazz Club in Stoke Newington and then at various London venues. He was spotted by singer-songwriter Tom Robinson who offered him a support slot at the Borderline in June 1996. Over the next few years he performed at the Edinburgh Festival (winning a 'Spirit of the Fringe' award, and being regarded by the Glasgow Herald as a highlight of the festival), Vancouver International Comedy Festival and also on various radio networks. Guitarist John Peacock replaced William George Q, and the trio was joined by drummer Jezza Campbell. Jeays' 1996 performance at Edinburgh saw him compared to Tom Waits, with The Stage stating that he performed "with wit and flair...songs move from caustic satire to sentimentality, and never hit a false note". He has been compared to Scott Walker and David Bowie.

== Recordings ==
Jeays released his first CD, October, on his own Ditton Pye label. He also contributed to two BBC Radio 4 programmes 'Singing in the Wilderness' (presented by Tom Robinson and 'Chanson' presented by Kit Hesketh-Harvey.

He continued to record and release albums; Cupid Is A Drunkard (2000), The Ballad Of Ruben Garcia (2002), Fame (2003), and Mr Jeays (2005); while performing at various venues around London, Sussex and occasional trips up to Leeds, Hull and Manchester. He usually either performs solo or with a group of musicians from Brighton that include Paul Stapleton, Kerry Stapleton and Simon Goble. In 2019 he released Angelina Supercop, followed by Blossoms and Bicycles in 2021.

== Battersea Barge ==
Since the early 2000s he has staged The Jeays Christmas Extravaganza at the Battersea Barge, London. This has continued to be a popular annual event among Jeays fans and features him performing with David Harrod, Jezza Campbell, John Peacock, William George Q and, more recently, Kerry Stapleton on double bass. The setlist for the Christmas shows is made up of requests from the audience who are given a raffle ticket at the door. Before each song Jeays will pick out and read a raffle ticket number and take a song request from the ticket holder. The show is usually hosted by poet Geoff The Speech Painter, who performs a support slot at the start of the evening. John Peacock has also performed a short set as support.

Besides the Christmas shows, Jeays and the band have also performed album launch shows around the time of each CD release.

== Supporting Robin Ince ==
In 2006, Jeays was invited to perform as part of 'Robin Ince Loves Books' shows at the Bloomsbury Theatre and The Albany in London. He performed as support on Robin Ince's 'Bleeding Heart Liberal' tour of the UK in 2009 and also on Robin's Nine Lessons and Carols for Godless People shows at the Bloomsbury Theatre and Hammersmith Apollo. Jeays also performed at Robin Ince and Brian Cox's 'End of the World Show' at the Hammersmith Apollo in December 2012.

== Discography ==
- October (1999)
- Cupid Is A Drunkard (2000)
- The Ballad Of Ruben Garcia (2002)
- Fame (2003)
- Mr Jeays (2005)
- London (2009)
- My Own Way (2012)
- The Widest Walk (2015)
- The Bunjies Test (2014)
- Take the Slow Train (2016)
- Angeline Supercop (2019)
- Blossoms and Bicycles (2021)
