= Jonny & the Baptists =

English musical comedy duo

- Origin: England
- Genres: Comedy rock
- Years active: 2011–present
- Members: Jonny Donahoe; Paddy Gervers
- Past members: Amy Butterworth
- Website: jonnyandthebaptists.co.uk

Jonny & the Baptists are an English musical comedy duo consisting of Jonny Donahoe and Paddy Gervers. Initially founded as trio in 2011, founding member Amy Butterworth left after their first live tour and album, and the duo of Donahoe & Gervers have since released two studio albums, multiple live albums and several digital singles, as well as gaining attention for their podcast series Making Paddy Happy which began in 2020 during the COVID-19 lockdown.

Jonny & the Baptists have regularly appeared on BBC Radio 4 including The Now Show, The Infinite Monkey Cage, Sketchorama, and Live at Television Centre. They have topped the iTunes comedy chart with single Farage, supported Mark Thomas on tour and appeared at major festivals from Latitude and Kaleidoscope to Tolpuddle Martyrs and Greenbelt.

== History ==
=== Formation & initial shows ===
Jonny & the Baptists formed in 2011, when standup comedian Jonny Donahoe got talking to multi-instrumentalist Paddy Gervers at a wedding. Though the pair had known each other casually for about a decade, they gelled on this occasion and decided to get tickets to see Pulp together at Brixton Academy shortly afterwards. In their words: "We went there, got hammered again and did that whole ‘Hey you, you know what we should do? We should start a BAND – wouldn’t that be great? You and me, BAND FRIENDS’ etc. and a few days later we actually went through with it. We just sort of hit it off and immediately trusted each other, dropping everything else to try and make this work and it's brilliant".

By the following spring, Donahoe & Gervers had recruited violinist Amy Butterworth to create an hour of "comedy blues" for the upcoming 2012 Edinburgh Fringe Festival. Prior to the festival, the band released music videos on YouTube for the songs "Upper Middle Glass Gangster Children" and "Do It in the Library", and made appearances at the 2012 Latitude Festival. The resulting Fringer show, simply titled Jonny & the Baptists opened on 2 August at Underbelly, Cowgate, and ran until 26 August before heading out on a UK tour in the autumn. A studio recording of the songs featured in the show was sold at the live shows, and later released via Bandcamp in 2013.

=== Bigger Than Judas ===
Butterworth left the band after their first UK tour, and by March 2013 Donahoe & Gervers released their first video on YouTube as a duo, titled Boom, and had begun making appearances on BBC Radio 4's The Now Show. Their second Edinburgh Fringe show, Bigger Than Judas, ran at Pleasance Dome in August 2013, and received positive reviews, with WhatsOnStage claiming they were "something completely different, even a contemporary Flanders and Swann". A live recording of the show, taped in London during the previews, was sold at the Fringe and later on the band's subsequent UK tour and via Bandcamp.

=== The Farage EP & Stop UKIP ===
In early 2014, the band collaborate with Mark Thomas on his 100 Minor Acts of Dissent project, writing a song about UKIP leader Nigel Farage. The song, simply entitled "Farage", mocked Farage's xenophobic attitudes by intentionally mispronouncing his French surname and attempting to find an alternate meaning for the word, ultimately settling on liquid sediment at the bottom of a bin. Around the same timeframe, the band also released the music video "Ukip Party Song", which poked fun at the political party's ambitions and attitudes.

With Jonny & the Baptists heading out on a UK tour entitled Stop UKIP, UKIP's deputy leader Paul Nuttall encouraged their supporters to send complaints to venues on the tour to attempt to block the band from performing, with particular focus on venues in receipt of public funding via Arts Council England, such as Manchester's Royal Exchange Theatre. UKIP, which claims to be the ‘party of free speech’, condemned the show and called on the Arts Council to investigate the public funding given to venues hosting the act, with Nuttall quoted as saying “This blatantly party political rubbish is being staged to coincide with the run-up to the Euro elections in May and I am appalled that one of the venues is the much lauded Royal Exchange Theatre in Manchester.” The incident came just days Nigel Farage defended jokes made about foreigners by a comic performing at a UKIP fundraiser, stating "We are heading down a road here where we would kill all humour in this country if we tear things to pieces. Enough is enough, let people tell their jokes". As a result of hundreds of comments both for and against the band being targeted at venues, many of the dates on the tour required additional security personnel to be positioned within the auditoriums as a precautionary measure.

=== The Satiric Verses, The End Is Nigh and Eat the Poor ===
The duo returned to the Edinburgh Fringe in 2014, 2015 and 2016 with the shows The Satiric Verses, The End is Nigh and Eat the Poor respectively, with each show also being taken on a subsequent UK tour and an album being released as limited edition CDs at live shows and via Bandcamp as digital downloads. The Satiric Verses and Eat the Poor were both recorded live, with the latter containing a recording of a song about Margaret Thatcher's funeral taped in Guilford which led to conservative members of the audience walking out of the show as it progressed, while The End is Nigh was accompanied by an acoustic demo CD recorded without an audience.

Whilst The Satiric Verses and The End is Nigh were both similar mixes of stand-up comedy and musical numbers as before, Eat the Poor played with the format with its second half taking what The Velvet Onion called "an odd twist into a dystopian alternate-reality future in which Paddy is abandoned by Jonny in favour of a cushy deal writing musicals with Andrew Lloyd Webber, and finds himself on the streets with almost everyone else".

=== Lefty Scum & Songs for the Apocalypse ===
Eat the Poor became the band's final full length Edinburgh Fringe show to date, with their 2017 engagement limited to a handful of dates performing a compilation of their favourite material. In late 2017, they toured the UK alongside Josie Long and Grace Petrie on a triple-headline tour called Lefty Scum, with each act performing two 20 minute sets apiece. Further dates in early 2018 followed, alongside a limited engagement in 2019 with Petrie replaced by Angela Barnes.

The duo followed this by finally recording what they considered to be a proper studio album. The result, Songs for the Apocalypse was released in 2018, and features a full band line-up of session musicians accompanying the duo on new material and reworkings of older songs. Some of these, such as "Prime Minister Obama" and "Give Blood" were updated lyrically to reflect changes to the political climate, while others, such as "When You Grow Up", were expanded with additional verses to take advantage of the format.

=== Love You & Hate Edinburgh / Bastards / Covid ===
The band returned to the Edinburgh Fringe with a limited run show Jonny & the Baptists Love Edinburgh and Hate Bastards in August 2019, with Chortle calling it "an emotional roller-coaster, but one you’ll want to ride". Retitled Jonny & the Baptists Love You and Hate Bastards, the show toured the UK in late 2019, again with an accompanying audio CD of live recordings from early preview dates being sold on tour and online, this time crowd-funded via Kickstarter. A more personal show than previous, highly political sets, this tour saw the band shift gears slightly away from overtly political material and towards an investigation of love and loss, with songs about both Donahoe's newborn baby with Josie Long, and the death of Gervers' mother when he was a child.

The duo were set to tour the UK again in the spring of 2020 when the COVID-19 pandemic hit, and venues across the country closed down. To combat this, the band decided to undertake a virtual tour, and revamped their most recent show into Jonny & The Baptists Love You and Hate Covid, allowing each venue on the planned tour to sell tickets to a live-stream performance in the basement of a then-closed pub, with the band stating: "Each show will be performed as if from a different city and venue, via the power of live streaming. Even if we can’t actually go there, we can still support our favourite venue’s staff, friends and local audience with a specific version of our touring show."

=== Making Paddy Happy and Dance Like It Never Happened ===
Both Donahoe & Gervers have openly discussed their struggles with mental health, and with the COVID-19 lockdown cutting off their income and creative outlet, the duo launched a Patreon page and a new podcast, Making Paddy Happy. Initially a brief daily chat to give them some focus, the episodes eventually settled into a pattern of two per week - with a free episode first, followed by a Patreon exclusive episode.

With the re-opening of live venues across the UK in the summer of 2021, the duo began to perform their new live tour, Dance Like It Never Happened with the tour beginning in June and continuing on and off until October. A second leg of the tour was scheduled to take place between March and June 2022.

Following their previous crowdfunded campaign, the duo again turned to Kickstarter to help fund the recording of the Dance Like It Never Happened studio album, with the project sourcing £11,379 of funding (from a £10k maximum target), more than double the result of their previous Kickstarter in 2019. The album was released on 17 December 2019.

== Discography ==
=== Albums ===
- Jonny & the Baptists (2012)
- Bigger Than Judas (Live in London) (2013)
- The Farage EP (2014)
- The Satiric Verses (Live in London) (2014)
- The End Is Nigh (Limited Edition Demo Album) (2015)
- Eat the Poor (Live) (2016)
- Songs for the Apocalypse (2018)
- Love You & Hate Bastards (Live) (2019)
- Dance Like It Never Happened (2021)
