= Creaming Jesus =

British musical group

- Origin: London, England
- Genres: Gothic rock, heavy metal, post-punk, alternative rock, punk rock (early)
- Years active: 1987–1994
- Labels: Jungle; Freud
- Past members: Andy Heintz; Paul Scanlan; Des; Flo; Dave Fridmann; Tally; Roy Jenkins; Mario; Richard Corden; Roger Hunt; Lindy

Creaming Jesus was an English band formed in London in 1987, influenced by gothic rock, punk and thrash metal. Their original line up was Andy (vocals), Lil (vocals), Tally (bass), Roy (drums), Lindy (drums), and Paul Scanlan (guitar). Their original sound was a wall of percussive noise (two drummers and a drum machine), Slayer-influenced thrash metal guitarists and screamed vocals.

== Career ==
The band's first release was a track on the House of Dolls fanzine covermounted 7" single. They then self-released the 12" EP Nailed Up For Nothing, before being signed to Jungle Records of London, who re-released the EP and put them in the studio to record two further EPs, Mug and Bark (which included a cover version of the Cure's 'A Forest')

Guitarist Paul Scanlan left following the release of their first three 12" EPs, and joined the Satanic metal band Akercocke

The group then recruited Richard and Mario as guitarists, and Des replaced Lindy on drums.

In 1990, Creaming Jesus went on tour with Fields of the Nephilim to coincide with their debut album Too Fat To Run, Too Stupid To Hide. The band returned almost immediately to the studio to record two more singles, "Deadtime" and "Ditchdweller V". Their second album, Guilt By Association, produced by Brian Chuck New, remained in the indie charts for months, as they toured the country.

Following the departure of Des, who was replaced by percussionist Roger, a further session yielded the original Headrush E.P. which coincided with a full four-week UK tour. They also toured extensively throughout Europe and Scandinavia, and were one of the first UK bands to play in the newly independent country of (what was) Czechoslovakia. Overseas demand led to their first three singles being compiled for an album It's Dance Magic.

For their third album, the band took time off from touring to prepare the new material and after much planning recorded with Dave Fridmann of Mercury Rev as producer in Sweetfish, an isolated converted barn in upstate New York. They had met when Creaming Jesus and Mercury Rev toured the UK and Europe together on Mercury Rev's first ever dates in Europe. The result of this session being the album Chaos for the Converted (1994), preceded by the single "Hamburg", their style evolving away from the relentless industrial gothic thrash of their previous releases to explore a more experimental psychedelic sound.

The band's final performance in 1994 was at the Venue in New Cross, South London, a gig which was recorded and later released by Jungle Records under the title End of an Error. By this time their sound was further augmented by the addition of violin player Ffion, who now plays in the band Pronghorn.

The track "Reptile" from the Guilt... album made an appearance in an episode of the TV series, Buffy the Vampire Slayer.

== Related projects ==
Singer Andy went on to play in extreme noise band, Ridiculous, with members of Headbutt and The Homage Freaks; releasing one track on the first Household Name records release. He then produced music under various pseudonyms including Armchair Generals, The Master (Hubcap Decorator Trilogy) and Filtrum (Sad Robot Happy Robot). He is now a member of Giant Paw and touring with comedian Andrew O'Neill with their steampunk band The Men That Will Not Be Blamed for Nothing.

Roy and Roger went on to set up Noise Management and Noise Merchandise

Guitarist Richard Corden went on the play with Star 69 who relocated to Los Angeles, California, US in 1995.

== Discography ==
- Nailed Up for Nothing EP (12") Jungle Records 1989
- Mug EP EP (12") Jungle Records 1989
- Bark EP EP (12") Jungle Records 1990
- Too Fat to Run, Too Stupid to Hide (LP) Jungle Records 1990
- Dead Time EP (12") (CD, Maxi) Jungle Records 1991
- Ditch Dweller V...The Story Continues (CD, Maxi) Jungle Records 1991
- Guilt by Association (CD, Album) Jungle Records 1992
- Headrush (CD, EP) Jungle Records 1992
- Hamburg EP (CD/EP)
- Chaos for the Converted (LP) Jungle Records 1994
- End of an Error (LP) Jungle Records 1994

Tracks appear on:

- Untitled (7") Jessie The God House of Dolls 1988
- New Alternatives (LP) Hungerford Nightbreed Recordings 1990
- Gothic Rock (CD) Reptile Jungle Records 1992
- Gothic Rock (2xLP, Gat) Reptile Jungle Records 1992
- Gothic Rock 1 (2xCD) Reptile Cleopatra 1993
- The Whip (2xCD) Upside Down Jungle Records 1993
- Gothic Rock 2 (3xLP, Gat) Celebrity Cannibalism ... Jungle Records 1995
- Gothic Rock 2 – 80's into 90's (2xCD) Celebrity Cannibalism ... Jungle Records 1995
- Gothic Rock 2: 80's into 90's (2xCD) Celebrity Cannibalism ... Cleopatra 1995
- Flesh, Fangs & Filigree (3xCD) The Skinny Head Fuck Dressed To Kill 1996
- Flesheaters: The Return of the Undead (3xCD + Box) I Lost My Faith Dressed To Kill 1996
- Punks on Drugs! (CD) Smoke (Skin Up For Jesus) Antidote (3) 1997
- Zwischenfall – From The 80's to the 90's Vol. 2 (2xCD) A Forest Subtronic Records 1997
- Gothic Erotica (6xCD) The Skinny Head Fuck, ... Dressed To Kill 1998
- Gothic Rock 3 – Black on Black – Best of 80's Collection (2xCD) A Forest Cleopatra 1998
- Gothic Rock 3 – Black on Black – Best of 80's Collection (2xCD) A Forest Jungle Records 1998
- Undead: A Gothic Masterpiece (3xCD + Box) Upside Down Dressed To Kill 1999
- Gothic Party Time (CD) Temple Of Love, A Forest Jungle Records 2005
- The Goth Anthology (3xCD + Box) Blind Metro Triples 2006
