= Andrew O'Neill =

British comedian (born 1979)

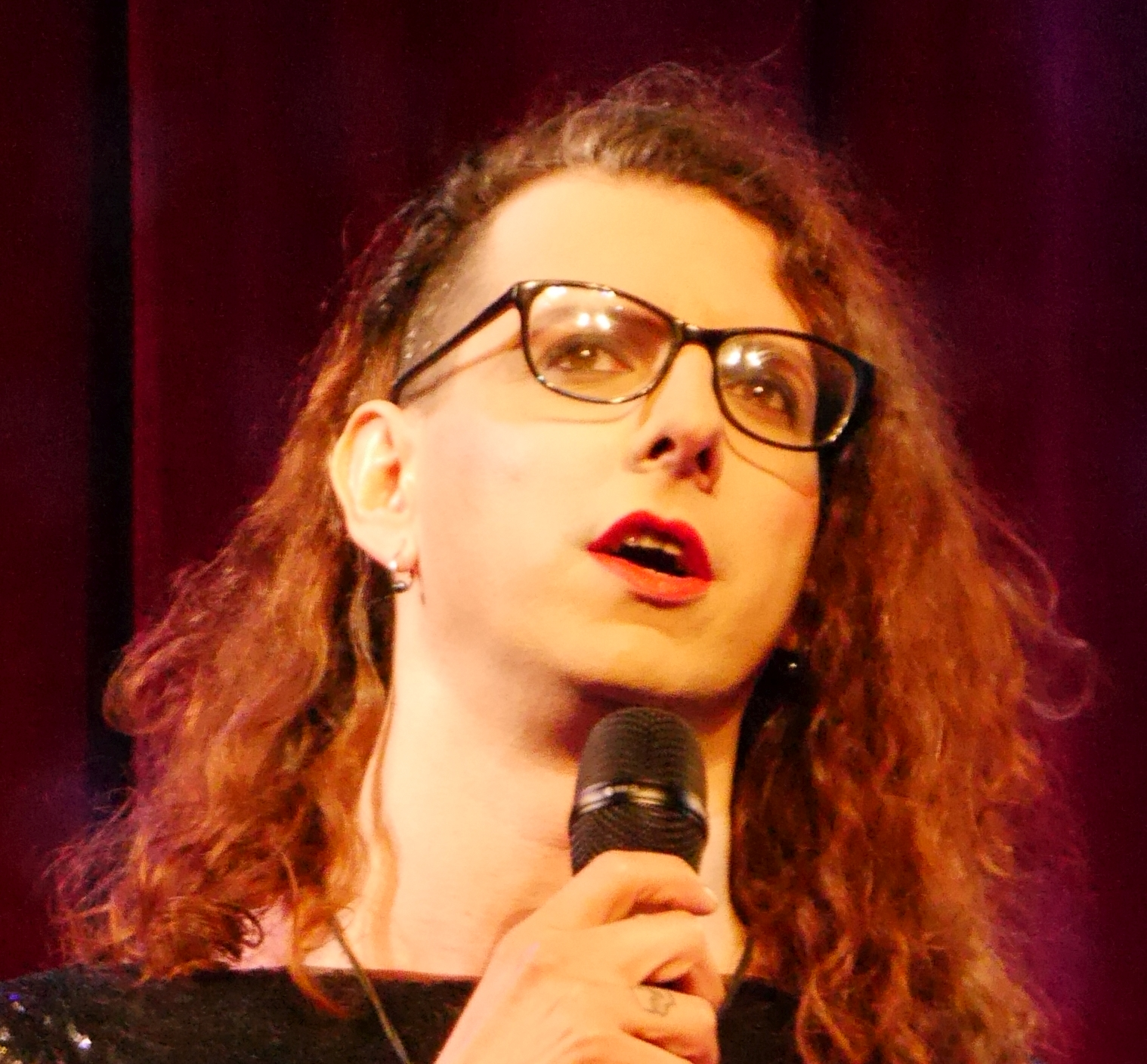
- Andrew O'Neill, Glastonbury Festival, 2019
- Born: 14 September 1979 (age 47); Portsmouth, England
- Website: www.andrewoneill.co.uk

Andrew O'Neill (born 14 September 1979) is a British comedian, musician, presenter, and writer who lives in London.

== Background ==
Born in Portsmouth in 1979, O'Neill grew up in the London suburban town of Wallington. They have two brothers, Steve and David. They did their first comedy performance at the age of ten, and started their stand-up career on 16 January 2002 at the Laughing Horse, Camden. They have since gone on to perform in comedy clubs, theatres and music festivals throughout the UK, Australia, US and Europe.

O'Neill has described themself as "a vegan, heterosexual transvestite, who happens to be a metalhead and amateur occultist". O'Neill is non-binary, uses they/them pronouns.

== Career ==
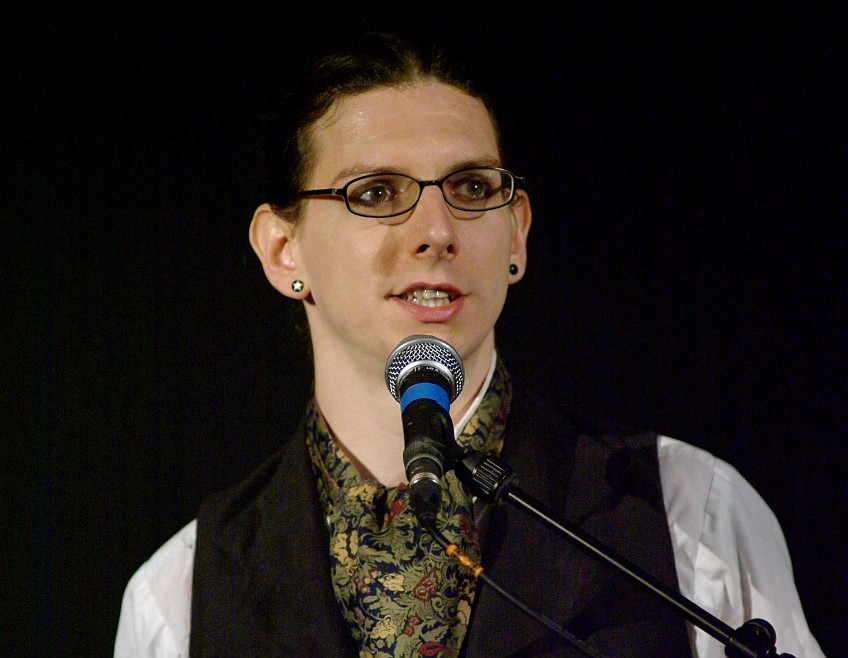
Performing "Andrew O'Neill's Totally Spot-On History of British Industry" in 2008

Andrew is a regular on the comedy stage at Download Festival, played to 5,500 people at Sonisphere Festival, opened for Amanda Palmer from The Dresden Dolls, and has performed at comedy festivals in Adelaide, Melbourne and Wellington. They have a column in Terrorizer magazine.

O'Neill is the guitarist for steampunk band The Men That Will Not Be Blamed For Nothing.

In 2017 they published their first book, A History of Heavy Metal. It was described by Alan Moore as "a comprehensive landmark analysis of an enormous area of music that has been too long without such a thing, and has the massive advantage of the funny being turned up to twelve. A loud and thoroughly engrossing love-story."

In 2023 they appeared as Mutt's Spouse in Series 2 of Good Omens.

== Live credits ==
- ...Is Easily Distracted (2012)
- Alternative (2011) (UK & Australia tour)
- Andrew O'Neill (2010) (UK & Australia tour)
- Occult Comedian (2009) (UK & Australia tour)
- Andrew O'Neill's Totally Spot-On History of British Industry (2008)
- Futuristicelectrodeathninja9000 (2007)
- Winston Churchill was Jack the Ripper, the full account (2006)
- The Last Show Around (2005)
- Andrew O'Neill and James Sherwood, Apparently (2004)
- UK Tour September 2007 – October 2007 as special guest of Norman Lovett
- UK Tour January 2008 – July 2008, with Terry Saunders
- UK Tour September 2008 – June 2009, featuring special guest, former Creaming Jesus and current Giant Paw vocalist, Andy Heintz.
- UK & Australia Tour September 2010 – June 2011
- UK & Australia Tour September 2011 – February 2012
- UK & Australia Tour March 2012 – November 2012

== Radio and television ==
- Never Mind the Buzzcocks, BBC 2
- Saxondale (with Steve Coogan), BBC 2
- Good News Week, Ten (Australia)
- Spicks and Specks, ABC1 (Australia)
- Fags, Mags and Bags, BBC Radio 4
- The 7th Dimension, BBC Radio 4 Extra
- The Richard Bacon Show, BBC Radio 5 Live
- The Milk Run (with Josie Long, Alex Musson, Isy Suttie and Danielle Ward), BBC Radio 1
- Tom and Andrew Discuss, Resonance FM
- The Museum of Curiosity, BBC Radio 4 Extra
- The Blame Game, BBC One Northern Ireland
- Pharmacist Baffler (writer and performer), BBC Radio 4 Extra
- Damned Andrew (writer and performer), BBC Radio 4, 2022
- Good Omens, Amazon Prime Video

== Publication ==
- O'Neill, Andrew (2017). A History of Heavy Metal. Headline Publishing Group. ISBN 978-1472241443.

== Awards ==
- Transgender Television Awards 2015, Special Award for Excellence for the show Pharmacist Baffler – Winner
- Best Comedy 2012, Adelaide Fringe Festival – Nominee
- Best Show 2012, Leicester Comedy Festival – Nominee
- Best Comedy Performance 2011, Buxton Fringe – Nominee
- Best Comedy Performance 2010, Buxton Fringe – Nominee
- Chortle Award for Breakthrough Act 2009 – Nominee
