= Josie Long =

English comedian (born 1982)

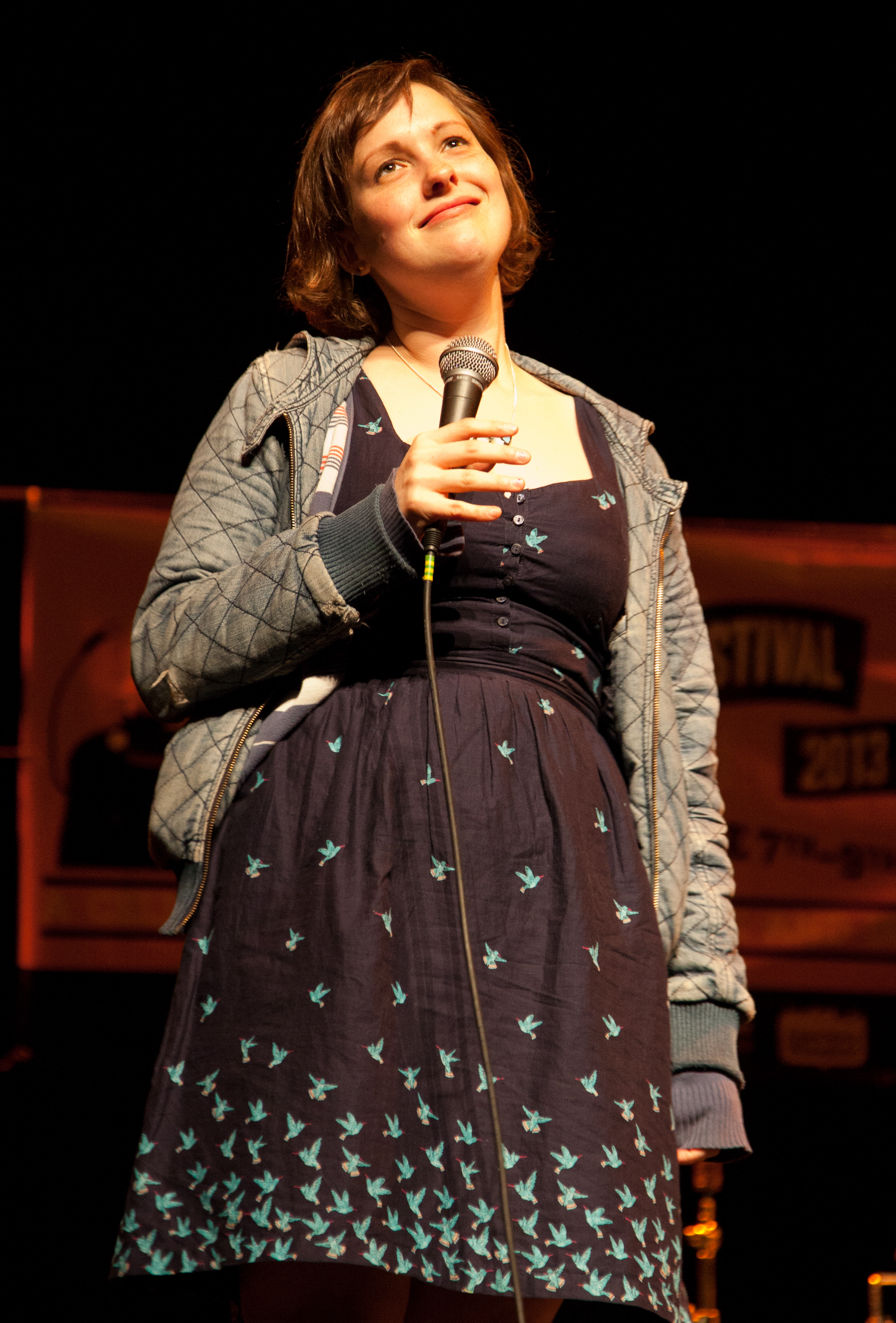
- Long at Long Division Festival in June 2013
- Born: 17 April 1982 (age 44); Sidcup, London, England
- Education: Lady Margaret Hall, Oxford
- Children: 2

Comedy career
- Years active: 1990s–present
- Medium: Stand-up, television, radio, film
- Website: www.josielong.com

Josie Isabel Long (born 17 April 1982) is an English comedian. She started performing as a stand-up at the age of 14 and won the BBC New Comedy Awards at 17.

In 2006, Long won the If.comeddies Best Newcomer award at the Edinburgh Festival Fringe for her show Kindness and Exuberance. She has been nominated for the Edinburgh Comedy Award for Best Show three times. In 2012, Long and director Doug King produced two short comedy films in Glasgow called Let's Go Swimming and Romance and Adventure, which were nominated for a BAFTA Scotland New Talent Award.

== Early life and education ==
Long was born in Sidcup and spent her early life in Orpington, London, where she attended Newstead Wood School for Girls. She began performing stand-up comedy at 14, winning the BBC New Comedy Awards at the age of 17. Long attended Michael Knighton's comedy course in Beckenham, London. At 18 she gave up stand-up whilst attending Lady Margaret Hall, University of Oxford, ran experimental comedy clubs, and graduated with a degree in English.

== Career ==
After graduating Long returned to live stand-up, supporting Stewart Lee on his spring 2005 tour. In March that year, Long was named Best Newcomer at the 2005 Chortle Awards.

She contributed sketches and one-liners to BBC Radio 1's 2004/5 comedy show, The Milk Run with Andrew O'Neill. One edition of the show was entirely given over to a script she co-wrote with her friend Dan Harkin, entitled The Adventures Of Marco Polo.

In 2005 she began publishing a fanzine, Drawing Moustaches in Magazines Monthly Magazine (Bi-Monthly), which is distributed for free, and has featured contributions from Robin Ince, Kevin Eldon and Stewart Lee, as well as Danielle Ward and Isy Suttie.

She appeared in the show An Audience With Dan Nightingale & Josie Long with Mancunian comic Dan Nightingale, at the Café Royal, at the 2005 Edinburgh Fringe. In 2006 she won the If.comedies Best Newcomer award at the Fringe for her show Kindness and Exuberance.

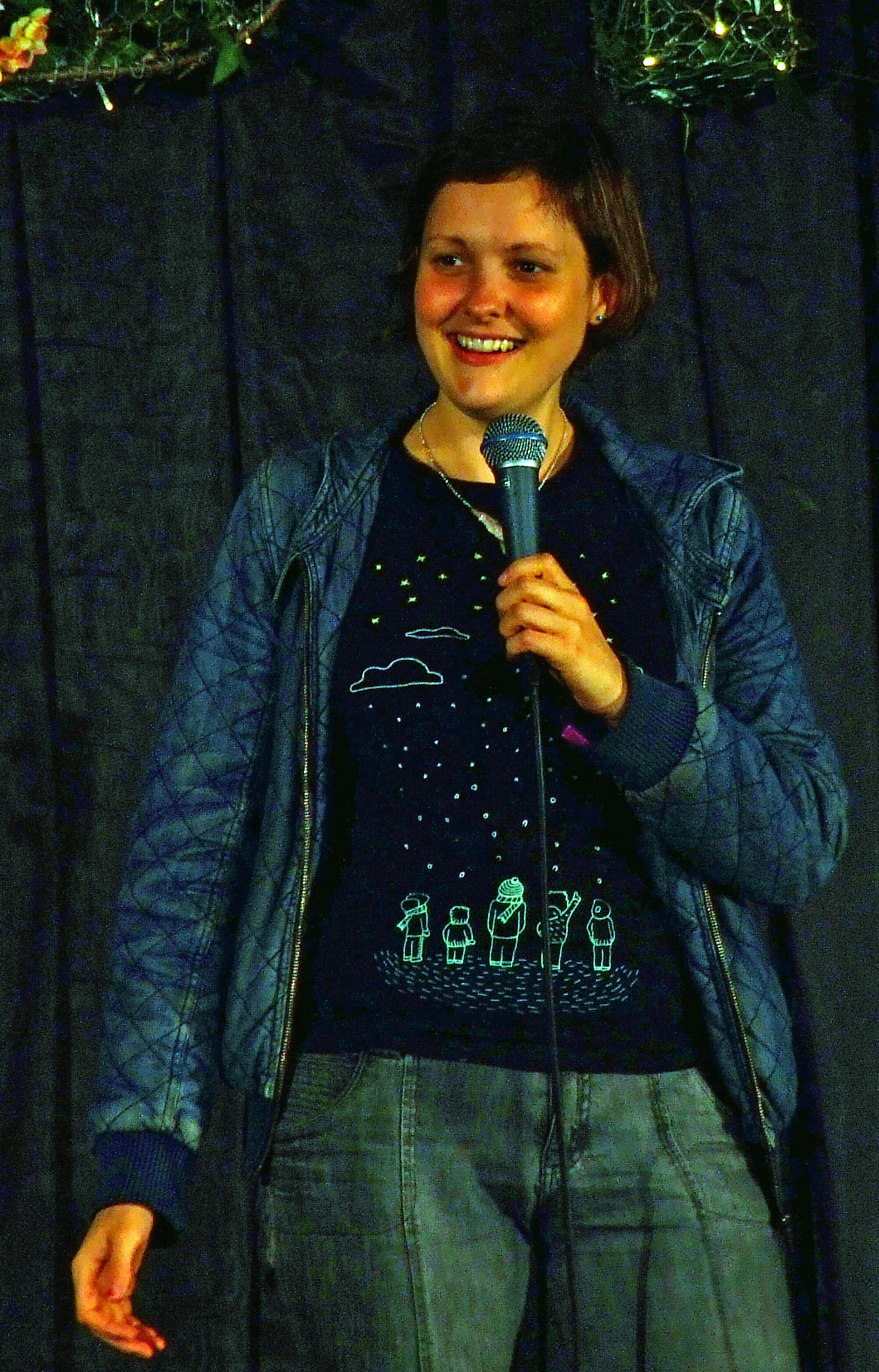
Long in 2010

As of 2014 she has performed seven solo shows at the Edinburgh Fringe Festival, and performed five subsequent UK tours in the spring of 2007, 2008 and 2009, autumn 2010 and spring 2012. She has appeared at the Melbourne International Comedy Festival (2007–10), the Adelaide Fringe Festival (2008), the New Zealand Comedy Festival (2008, 2010) and the Montreal Just For Laughs Festival (2008). Her show, Trying is Good was nominated for the Barry Award in Melbourne 2008. In 2009 she toured her show All of the Planet's Wonders, playing 14 dates during February and March. Her radio series based on the show, Josie Long: All of the Planet's Wonders was broadcast on BBC Radio 4 in early 2009.

Long has been nominated for the Edinburgh Comedy Award for Best Show three times, with her 2010 show, Be Honourable!, 2011's The Future Is Another Place and 2012's Romance & Adventure. Recordings of the former two were released on a cassette album entitled Lost Cats.

Along with fellow comics Hils Barker, Steve Hall and James Sherwood, she founded the All-Singing, All-Dancing Competitive News Bonanza, a live topical panel show that ran at the Red Lion pub in Soho in 2004/05, and at the Arts Theatre Club in Soho in 2006. In 2006 she also launched her own monthly comedy clubs, the Sunday Night Adventure Club, at the ABC Café in Crystal Palace, London (later at the Black Sheep pub), and The OK Club at the Boogaloo pub in Highgate, North London. Between 2011 and 2017 she ran and hosted "The Lost Treasures of the Black Heart" comedy club at the Black Heart pub in Camden Town, which was recorded and made available as a podcast.

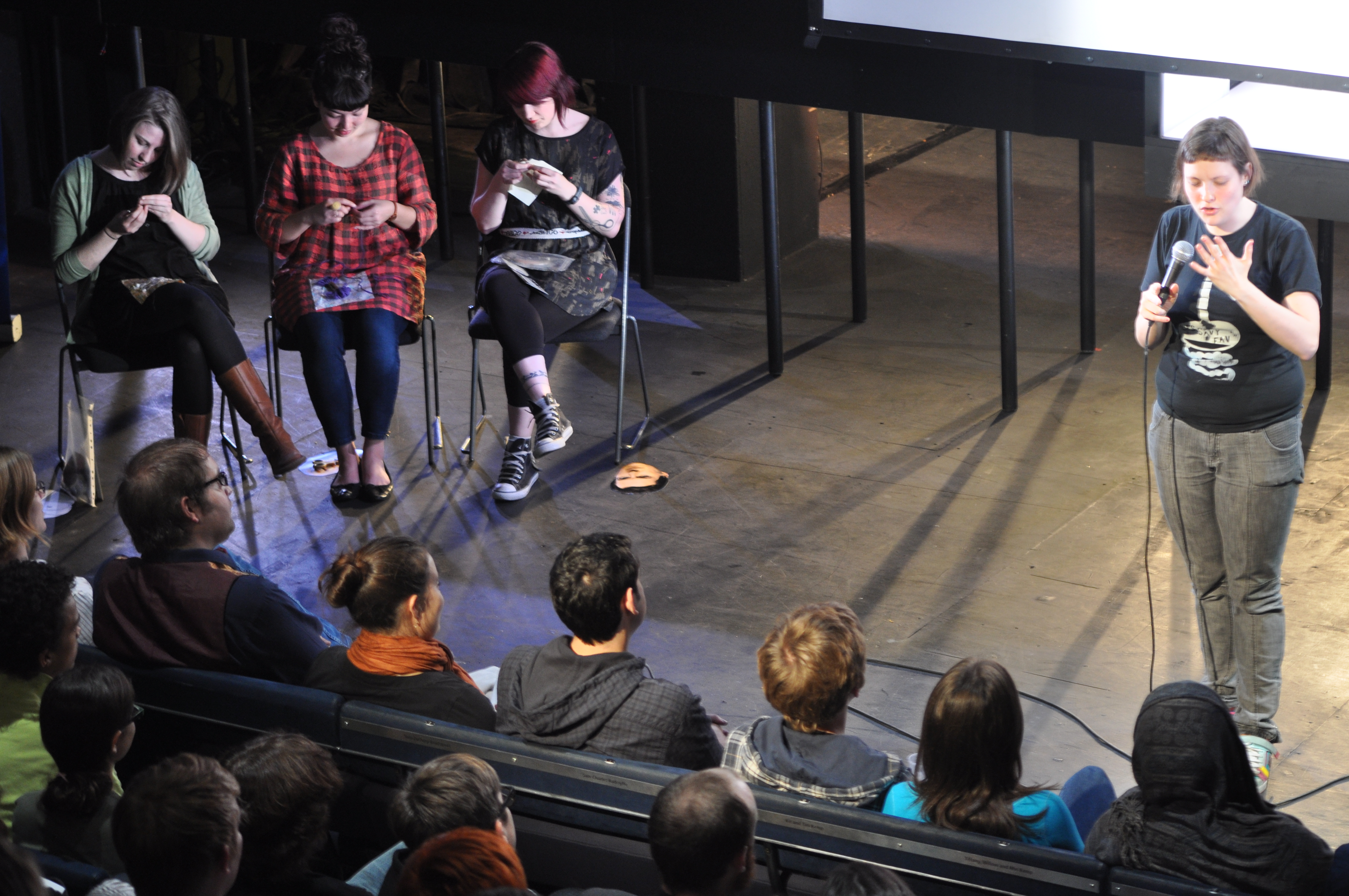
Josie Long and "Sew to Bed" craftivists with her on stage at Soho Theatre London in 2010

Long has written for the Channel 4 teen comedy-drama series Skins. She has also appeared in an online webisode and episodes five and 10 of the second series of the show.

Since 2013 Long has been the presenter of the BBC Radio 4 short documentary series and podcast Short Cuts, which was won multiple awards including the Gold for Best Radio Podcast at the British Podcast Awards in both 2017 and 2018.

She has also been involved in BBC Switch, on a weekly mini-feature called Josie Long's Confuse the Teacher Feature, where a word is read out by Long for young people listening to the show to include in their homework, which was formed after her suggestion of the idea during an interview on the show with Annie Mac.

She also appeared regularly in Robin Ince's podcast Show & Tell, now called Robin and Josie's Utter Shambles, co-hosted the Resonance FM show I, DJ with Danielle Ward and Isy Suttie, and guested on Answer Me This! podcast. She has also DJ-ed at the London indiepop club night Scared To Dance. She appeared on the Jon Richardson Show on 27 July 2008 and again on 15 February 2009. On 28 September 2008, she performed at the HungaMunga Festival at Bethnal Green Working Men’s Club. On 9 October 2008 she appeared on Never Mind the Buzzcocks in the second programme of the 22nd series. On 19 January 2009 she appeared on the radio panel game Just a Minute. She appeared in Australian improvised-comedy show Thank God You're Here twice, the first of which aired on 6 May 2009. On 5 July 2009 she appeared on Sunday Night Show on Absolute Radio with Iain Lee. On 14 and 28 July 2009 she appeared on Charlie Brooker's Channel 4 show You Have Been Watching.

On 21 and 23 August 2009 Long performed at the Green Man Festival. On 15 November 2009, Long was the guest on the Dave Gorman radio show on Absolute Radio and the subsequent podcast of the show, before making her second appearance with Iain Lee, this time on Iain Lee's 2 Hour Long Late Night Radio Show, on the same station eight days later. She occasionally wrote for Alan Moore's underground magazine Dodgem Logic.

On 15 January 2010 she was a contestant on Channel 4's panel show 8 Out of 10 Cats. On 18 March 2010 she appeared on the BBC Two comedy quiz TV programme show The Bubble. She wrote and performed three short plays as part of BBC Radio 4's Afternoon Play series, including one about apostrophes.

Since 2010, Long has been involved with the anti-tax-avoidance activist group UK Uncut, and in 2011 co-founded The Arts Emergency Service, a charity helping young people in education. She has on occasion promoted these groups through her stand-up and has also performed stand-up at protests and occupations, including the 2011 Hetherington House Occupation.

Long presented a Saturday morning radio show with Andrew Collins on BBC 6 Music and runs a monthly comedy club at The Black Heart in Camden Town, recordings of which are used for her new podcast The Lost Treasures of the Black Heart.

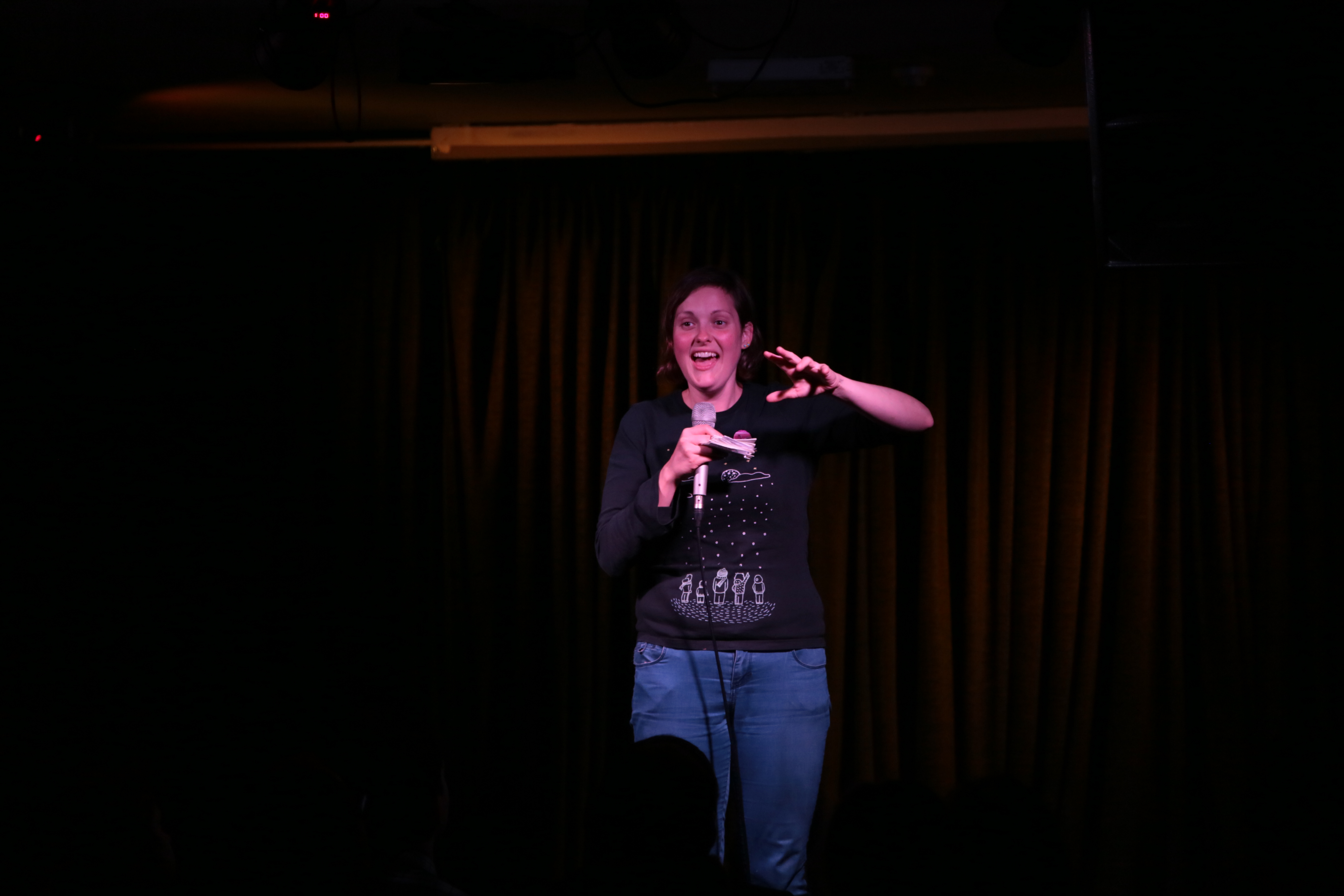
Josie Long performing at Lost Treasures of the Black Heart in London in September 2013

In 2012, Long toured the UK with Grace Petrie, Tom Parry and the activism group UK Uncut to protest against public-sector government funding cuts. Long and director Doug King also produced two short comedy films in Glasgow called Let's Go Swimming and Romance and Adventure, which were nominated for a BAFTA Scotland New Talent Award. The pair toured independent cinemas across the UK during Autumn 2013.

Long has been a Doctor Who fan since she was a child and she is interviewed for the special features of several classic series DVD releases, including Nightmare of Eden and Dragonfire.

In 2018, Long and Jonny Donahoe performed a comedy show together based around parenting and expecting the birth of their daughter. They subsequently turned the show into a podcast, Josie & Jonny Are Having a Baby (With You!). Drawing on this, Long's show at the 2019 Edinburgh Fringe, Tender, discussed the subject of childbirth and optimism about the future. A review in Chortle noted that "[the] whole act is well refined with funny voice breaks, emotional act-outs, exaggerations and unexpected callbacks. ... So much is covered in this hour, without it becoming wordy, overlong or a chore. And certainly without losing the funny, which it has in abundance."

Also in 2019 Long and Liam Williams wrote and starred in Perimeter, a dystopian play about a city divided into rich and poor areas by a giant fence. The play was broadcast as part of Radio 4's Dangerous Visions series. The same year, Long also presented a new podcast for English Heritage, Speaking with Shadows; the podcast won in the 'Contribution to Heritage' category at the UK Heritage Awards. In 2020, Long took her show Tender on tour around the UK.

During the week beginning 14 December 2020, Long appeared as one of the week's contestants on Richard Osman's House of Games. In 2022 she appeared in Champions Week House of Games.

== Personal life ==
On 28 May 2018, Long had a daughter with her partner, comedian Jonny Donahoe.

== Live credits ==
- 2019 Tender (stand-up show at the Edinburgh Fringe, National Tour)
- 2014 Cara Josephine (stand-up show at the Edinburgh Fringe, National Tour)
- 2012 Romance and Adventure (stand-up show at the Edinburgh Fringe, Melbourne International Comedy Festival 2013, New Zealand International Comedy Festival 2013 & UK tour)
- 2011 The Future is Another Place (stand-up show at the Edinburgh fringe, UK tour)
- 2011 MaxFunCon (stand-up show at a conference in Lake Arrowhead, California, USA)
- 2010 Be Honourable! (stand-up show at the Edinburgh Fringe, New Zealand and Melbourne Comedy Festivals, UK tour)
- 2009 Darwin's Birthday Spectacular with Robin Ince
- 2009 All of the Planet's Wonders (shown in detail) (Edinburgh Fringe, UK and Australian Tour)
- 2008 Trying is Good (Edinburgh Fringe, UK, NZ, Montreal and Australian Tour. UCB Los Angeles)
- 2006 Kindness and Exuberance (Edinburgh Fringe, UK and Australian Tour. UCB New York)

== Radio credits ==
- 2023 The Ultimate Choice : Episode 3 on BBC Radio 4
- 2022 Josie Long: What Next? on BBC Radio 4
- 2020 How do you cope? with Elis and John, BBC Sounds
- 2020 Josie Long’s Gambit on BBC Radio 4
- 2013 Come the Revolution on BBC Radio Wales
- 2013 - ongoing Short Cuts on BBC Radio 4
- 2011 Andrew Collins and Josie Long on BBC 6 Music
- 2010 So Wrong It's Right hosted by Charlie Brooker on BBC Radio 4
- 2010 The Adult Hour on TalkSport hosted by Ian Collins
- 2009 All the Planet's Wonders on BBC Radio 4

== Television credits ==
- 2022 Richard Osman's House of Games, series five, week 20, House of Champions
- 2020 Richard Osman's House of Games, series four, week 10
- 2016 Dara Ó Briain's Go 8 Bit, season one, episode five, Dave
- 2015 Celebrity Fifteen to One, Winner, Channel 4
- 2014 8 Out of 10 Cats Does Countdown, Channel 4
- 2014 Fifteen to One, Channel 4
- 2013 8 Out of 10 Cats Does Countdown, Channel 4
- 2013 Was It Something I Said?, Channel 4
- 2013 The Matt Lucas Awards, BBC1
- 2010 The Bubble, BBC2
- 2009 Skins, Channel 4, as Josie, the group's careers adviser in series two and then English teacher in series three
- 2009 Maeve Higgins' Fancy Vittles, RTÉ2 (Ireland), as Maeve Higgins's English friend
- 2009 Thank God You’re Here, various characters, season four, Seven Network

== Collections ==
The University of Kent holds material by Long as part of the British Stand-Up Comedy Archive. The collection includes set lists, promotional material, stage props for performances and zines.

Preceded by Waen Shepherd	Chortle Awards Best Newcomer; 2005	Succeeded by James Branch
Preceded by Tim Minchin	Edinburgh Fringe Best Comedy Newcomer; 2006	Succeeded by Tom Basden
