= A Very Steampunk Christmas EP =

EP by The Men That Will Not Be Blamed for Nothing
- Released: 6 December 2010
- Recorded: Dropout Studios
- Genre: Steampunk, Christmas
- Length: 9:05
- Label: Leather Apron

The Men That Will Not Be Blamed for Nothing chronology
| Now That's What I Call Steampunk! Volume 1 (2010) | A Very Steampunk Christmas EP (2010) | Anachrony In The UK: Live in London (2011) |

A Very Steampunk Christmas EP is an EP of original and traditional songs inspired by Christmas by the English steampunk band The Men That Will Not Be Blamed for Nothing. The EP, consisting of four tracks, was released by the band's own record label, Leather Apron, for digital downloads and as a 7" vinyl, limited to 300 units.

The bass guitarist, Marc Burrows, wrote detailed production notes regarding "Ebenezer's Carol".

== Track listing ==
1. "Ebenezer's Carol" – 3:00
2. "God Rest Ye Merry Gentlemen (Comfort And Oi)!" – 0:36
3. "Silent Night (Stille Nacht)" – 2:48
4. "Fox" – 2:41
