= Long Division Festival =

Music Festival

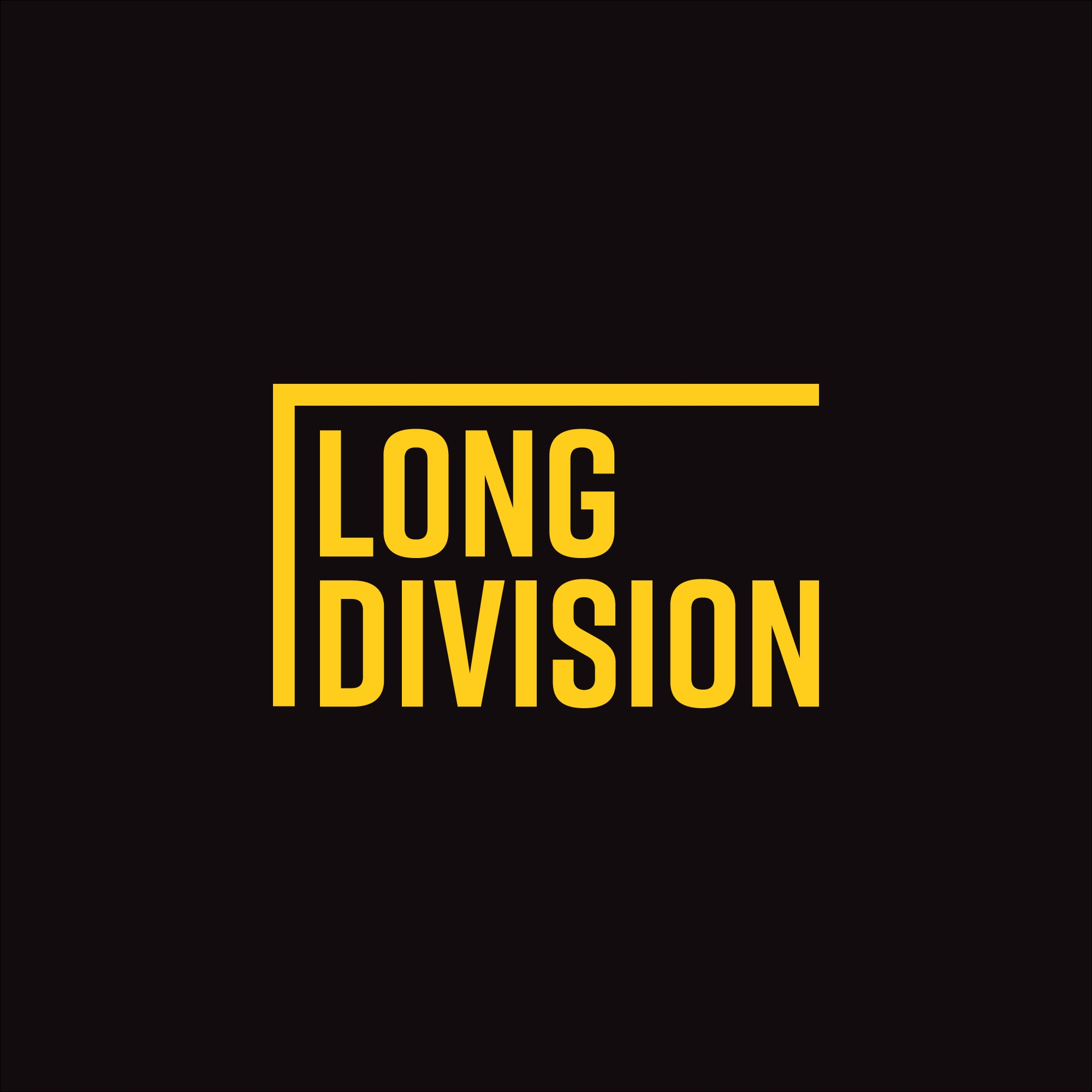
Long Division Festival Logo

Long Division Festival was a multiple venue music and culture festival that took place in Wakefield, England from 2011 to 2023.

It was founded by the fanzine Rhubarb Bomb and its editor Dean Freeman in 2011, who cashed in his NHS pension to fund the event. It was intended as a celebration of Wakefield's DIY culture and grassroots creativity, while bringing more attention to bands in the local music scene. In 2017, the organisation Long Division CIC was formed to manage the festival and its first of its kind education programme #YoungTeam worked to build a foundation of talent in the town.

Typically taking place over a weekend in June (sometimes September) the event made use of various live spaces within the city centre to host live music and featured a mix of emerging artists and notable headliners, including The Cribs, Billy Bragg, Ash, Asian Dub Foundation, The Fall, The Wedding Present, Sea Power and Peter Hook.

In January 2023, due to the impact of the COVID epidemic on the finances of the not-for-profit company running the festival, Freeman announced that the 2023 edition of the festival would be its last.
