= Jennifer Rogers =

British statistician

Jennifer Kaye Rogers is a British statistician. She was the Director of Statistical Consultancy Services at the University of Oxford and an associate professor at Oxford before joining contract research organisation PHASTAR in August 2019.

Her research has involved point processes and making inferences from the dropout times of repeated events, as well as applications of statistics to clinical trials for heart disease. She is also active in presenting statistics to the public.

== Education and career ==
Rogers studied statistics at Lancaster University with the plan of working in the pharmaceutical industry. She earned a bachelor's degree in mathematics with statistics from Lancaster University in 2006, completing a master's degree in statistics at Lancaster in 2007. While at Lancaster, she became more interested in statistical methodology and, following that interest, moved to the University of Warwick for doctoral study in statistics. She completed her Ph.D. in 2011. Her dissertation, Statistical Models for Censored Point Processes with Cure Fractions, was supervised by Jane Hutton.

After working as a research fellow and lecturer at the London School of Hygiene & Tropical Medicine, and as a post-doctoral research fellow at Oxford, she became Director of Statistical Consultancy Services at Oxford in 2016, and associate professor in 2019. She joined contract research organisation PHASTAR as head of statistical research in August 2019.

== Service ==
Rogers is vice president for external affairs of the Royal Statistical Society. She was the 2018 president of the Mathematical Sciences Section of the British Science Association.

== Recognition ==
Rogers was chosen as the Guy Lecturer for 2014 by the Royal Statistical Society. At Oxford, Rogers won an MPLS Impact Award in 2018 for her "contribution ... to the engagement of young people and non-statisticians with the application of statistics".
