= The Men That Will Not Be Blamed for Nothing =

British punk band

The Men That Will Not Be Blamed For Nothing
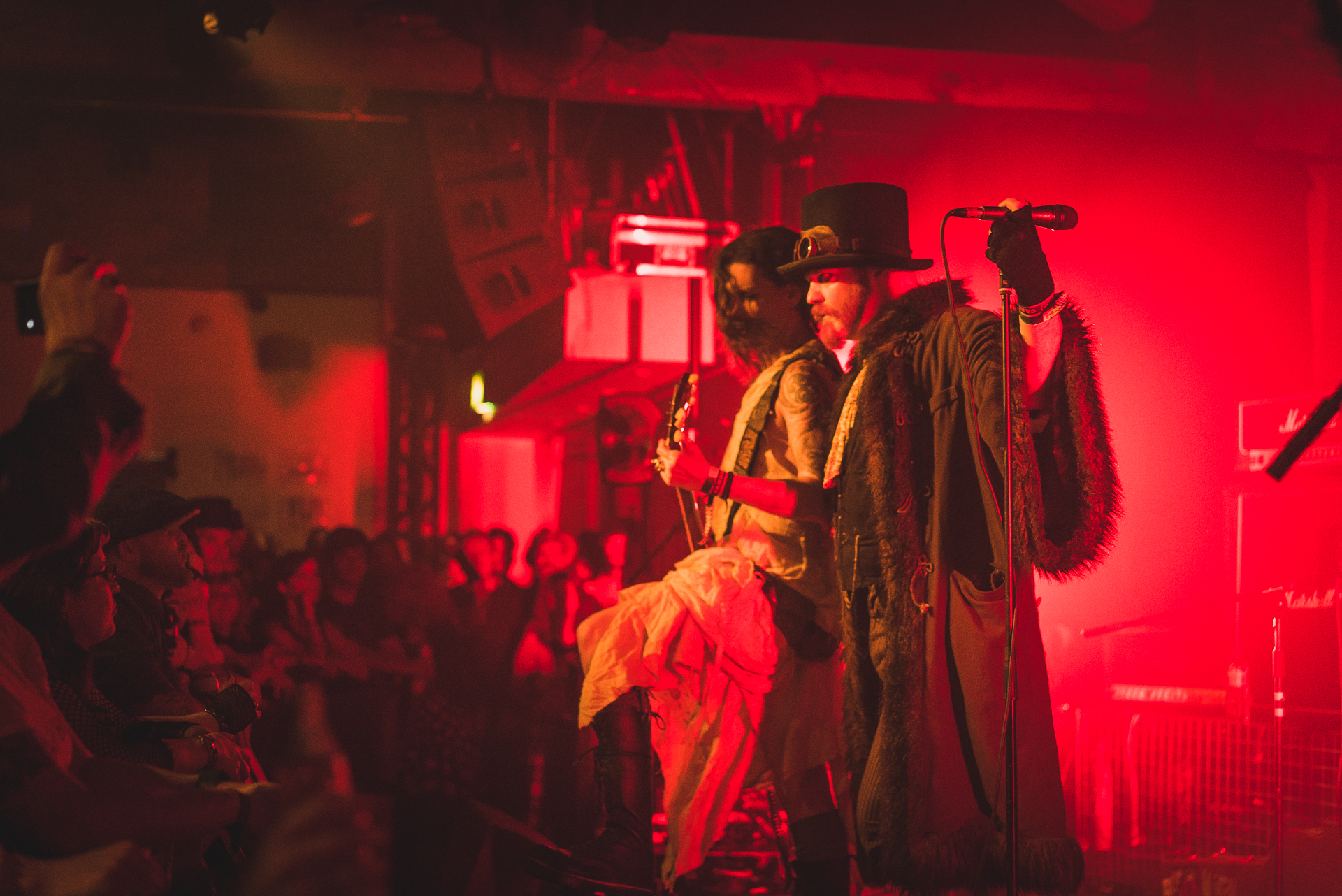
- The Men That Will Not Be Blamed For Nothing, in 2016

Background information
- Origin: London, England
- Genres: Punk rock; Oi!; grindcore; crossover thrash
- Years active: 2008–(on hiatus since 2022)
- Members: Andrew O'Neill; Andy Heintz; Marc Burrows
- Past members: Ben Dawson; Jez Miller
- Website: facebook.com/blamedfornothing

The Men That Will Not Be Blamed for Nothing are an English punk band from London formed in 2008. Their name is a reference to the chalked graffiti discovered above a section of a blood-stained apron thought to have been discarded by Jack the Ripper as he fled the scene of Catherine Eddowes's murder. They describe themselves as "crusty punk meets Cockney sing-songs meets grindcore in the 1880s." Initially associated with the steampunk movement, they have since sought to broaden their sound and distance themselves from the tag, incorporating elements of death metal, hardcore punk, the new wave of British heavy metal, thrash, black metal, goth, stand up comedy and music hall. Their songs are usually set in the Victorian era but can often be read as allegory for the present day.

== Biography ==
Formed in 2008 by Andrew O'Neill and Andy Heintz, the Men That Will Not Be Blamed for Nothing have featured on the cover of the lifestyle magazine The Chap, within the covers of Bizarre Magazine and the NME and played in diverse venues including comedy clubs, festivals and theatres (the latter in support of frontperson O'Neill on the tour of their comedy show Andrew O'Neill's Totally Spot-On History of British Industry).

They have performed at the Whitby Gothic Weekend, steampunk events such as the UK Steampunk Convivial in Lincoln, the World Steam Expo in Detroit, Michigan, the Steampunk World's Fair in New Jersey, and more mainstream UK festivals such as Glastonbury Festival, Download Festival, Bestival, Camp Bestival, and the Latitude Festival.

Their debut album, entitled Now That's What I Call Steampunk! Volume 1, was released on 24 May 2010.

The song "Sewer" was released as a limited edition wax cylinder, limited to 40 copies in a presentation box, the first new song to be released on such a format in several decades.

In May 2010, original drummer Ben Dawson departed and was replaced with Jez Miller, formerly of Lords of the New Church.

A special limited edition 7-inch EP, entitled A Very Steampunk Christmas EP, was released on 6 December 2010 featuring the new line up.

An exclusive limited edition live album recorded at Nambucca, Holloway Road, London, entitled Anachrony in the UK Live in London April 2011, was released on 28 May 2011.

In August 2011, the band released a second wax cylinder of the new, original song "Free Spirit", limited to 40 copies, promoted via their Facebook page.

On 10 September 2011, the band announced on stage during the Weekend at the Asylum concert that their second album had been recorded and would be entitled And That Is The Reason Why The Men That Will Not Be Blamed For Nothing Cannot Be Killed By Conventional Weapons. The album was released on 12 March 2012 and features 12 songs with a running time of 36.10 minutes. The album title has changed slightly since the September announcement, and will now be called This May Be The Reason Why The Men That Will Not Be Blamed For Nothing Cannot Be Killed By Conventional Weapons.

On 27 January 2012, the band were given three working days to change the title of their first album or face legal action by EMI over trademark infringement of the label's Now That's What I Call... series. Rather than face a costly court battle the band agreed to change the album title to The Steampunk Album That Cannot Be Named for Legal Reasons.

In September 2013, they released a song, entitled "The Gin Song", from their new EP. The EP came out 7 October 2013, and features "The Gin Song" and "Third Class Coffin".

In May 2014, the band announced that Andy Heintz had been diagnosed with throat cancer. A planned US tour was cancelled, with Burrows and O'Neill instead performing stand up comedy sets across the US. The band made their debut at the Glastonbury Festival, and only appearance that summer, as a trio with O'Neill and Burrows sharing the vocals, joined on one song by Leeson O'Keefe of the band Neck. Burrows wrote an emotional account of the experience for UK website Drowned In Sound.

In October 2014, the band announced via their Facebook page that Heintz was recovering from his treatment, the band played a short run of shows culminating in a sold-out headline set London's The Garage, and a free Christmas show at the comparatively small The Islington.

In March 2015, the band appeared in a 'Drinking with... Steampunks', a comedy short commissioned for Channel 4's online platform All 4 and shot, appropriately, in the Brunel Museum featuring footage of the band in the Thames Tunnel and performing live at the relaunched 12 Bar Club. A short spring tour saw them appear in Bristol alongside She Makes War.

In May 2015, the band announced via their Facebook page that they had recorded their third album, Not Your Typical Victorians, at Livingston Recording Studios in North London, which would feature a re-recorded version of 'The Gin Song.' The album was released in the Autumn of 2015, following appearances at Glastonbury, Blissfields, Boomtown Fair, Secret Garden Party and other summer festivals. The album received positive reviews from Drowned In Sound, Louder Than War and Pure Rawk whose readers voted it Album of the Year at the site's annual awards.

The band announced the release of their fourth album, Double Negative in January 2018. A press release quoted the band describing the album as "a short, angry album that emphasised our punk side and pushed our sound forward. It’s dark, savage, brutal and holds up the rotten corpse of Britain’s past as a mirror to the sorry state of the present…and then rubs yer face in it so you won’t do it again. The humour is still there, but it’s dark and twisted- there’s very little of the Music Hall influence we’ve touched on before." The band announced a UK tour to promote the record.

The band confirmed in a syndicated interview with journalist Simon Price that they planned to record a follow-up album that would a counterpoint, with O'Neill saying "We’re on a two-album cycle and any songs that are more expansive and epic will go on the next album."

In June 2021, the band announced via Facebook that long-term member Jez Miller had left the band to pursue other opportunities. Upcoming shows and the fifth album would continue as planned with guest drummers until a new full time member could be recruited. A fifth album is yet to be released.

== Band members ==
- Andrew O'Neill (vocals, guitar)
- Gerhard 'Andy' Heintz (vocals, musical saw) (also of Giant Paw and Creaming Jesus)
- Marc Burrows (bass guitar)

== Discography ==
- Now That's What I Call Steampunk! Volume 1 (2010)
- Sewer (Wax Cylinder Edition) (2010)
- A Very Steampunk Christmas EP (2010)
- Anachrony in the UK: Live in London (2011)
- Free Spirit (Wax Cylinder Edition) (2011)
- This May Be the Reason Why the Men That Will Not Be Blamed for Nothing Cannot Be Killed by Conventional Weapons (2012)
- The Gin Song/Third Class Coffin (2013)
- Not Your Typical Victorians (2015)
- Double Negative (March 2018)

== Awards ==
The band won three categories at the 2016 Pure Rawk Awards:

- Band of the Year
- Frontperson of the Year (Andy Heintz)
- Album of the Year (Not Your Typical Victorians)

== See also ==
- List of steampunk works: Steampunk musicians
