= List of The Catherine Tate Show episodes =

The Catherine Tate Show is a British comedy sketch series, created by, written by and starring Catherine Tate. Produced by Tiger Aspect Productions, it was originally commissioned for BBC Two for the majority of its run, before moving to BBC One. The series additionally features Matthew Horne, Niky Wardley, Derren Litten, Aschlin Ditta, Angela McHale and Ella Kenion. Litten, Ditta and Horne also served as co-writers for the series.

During the course of the programme, 20 episodes of The Catherine Tate Show aired, including two specials over three series, between 16 February 2004 and 25 December 2007. In addition, one Comic Relief sketch aired in 2007, and four spin-off "Nan" specials broadcast between 25 December 2009 and 30 December 2015.

== Series overview ==
Series	Episodes	Originally released		
Series	Episodes	First released	Last released	Network
1	6	16 February 2004	22 March 2004	BBC Two
2	6	21 July 2005	25 August 2005	BBC Two
2	Special	20 December 2005		BBC Two
3	6	26 October 2006	30 November 2006	BBC Two
3	Special	25 December 2007		BBC One
Nan specials		25 December 2009	30 December 2015	BBC One

== Episodes ==
=== Series 1 (2004) ===
No. overall	No. in series	Title	Directed by	Written by	Original release date	UK viewers (millions)
1	1	"Episode 1"	Gordon Anderson	Catherine Tate, Derren Litten, Mathew Horne & Aschlin Ditta	16 February 2004	N/A (<2.40) (Note: Not reported in the weekly top 15 programmes for four-screen viewer ratings.)
2	2	"Episode 2"	Gordon Anderson	Catherine Tate, Derren Litten, Mathew Horne & Aschlin Ditta	23 February 2004	N/A (<2.40)
3	3	"Episode 3"	Gordon Anderson	Catherine Tate, Derren Litten & Arthur Mathews	1 March 2004	N/A (<2.08)
4	4	"Episode 4"	Gordon Anderson	Catherine Tate, Derren Litten & Aschlin Ditta	8 March 2004	N/A (<2.37)
5	5	"Episode 5"	Gordon Anderson	Catherine Tate, Derren Litten, Arthur Mathews & Mathew Horne	15 March 2004	N/A (<2.33)
6	6	"Episode 6"	Gordon Anderson	Catherine Tate, Derren Litten, Mathew Horne, Bruce Mackinnon & Aschlin Ditta	22 March 2004	N/A (<2.20)

=== Series 2 (2005) ===
No. overall	No. in series	Title	Directed by	Written by	Original release date	UK viewers (millions)
7	1	"Episode 1"	Gordon Anderson	Catherine Tate, Derren Litten, Mathew Horne & Aschlin Ditta	21 July 2005	3.50
8	2	"Episode 2"	Gordon Anderson	Catherine Tate, Derren Litten, Mathew Horne & Aschlin Ditta	28 July 2005	2.97
9	3	"Episode 3"	Gordon Anderson	Catherine Tate & Aschlin Ditta	4 August 2005	2.89
10	4	"Episode 4"	Gordon Anderson	Catherine Tate & Aschlin Ditta	11 August 2005	3.55
11	5	"Episode 5"	Gordon Anderson	Catherine Tate, Aschlin Ditta & Steve Pemberton	18 August 2005	3.48
12	6	"Episode 6"	Gordon Anderson	Catherine Tate, Jenny Lecoat & Aschlin Ditta	25 August 2005	3.92
Special
13	–	"The Catherine Tate Christmas Show"	Christine Gernon	Catherine Tate	20 December 2005	5.66

=== Series 3 (2006) ===
No. overall	No. in series	Title	Directed by	Written by	Original release date	UK viewers (millions)
14	1	"Episode 1"	Gordon Anderson	Catherine Tate, Aschlin Ditta & Gordon Anderson	26 October 2006	4.81
15	2	"Episode 2"	Gordon Anderson	Catherine Tate, Aschlin Ditta & Gordon Anderson	2 November 2006	4.25
16	3	"Episode 3"	Gordon Anderson	Catherine Tate, Aschlin Ditta & Gordon Anderson	9 November 2006	4.92
17	4	"Episode 4"	Gordon Anderson	Catherine Tate, Aschlin Ditta & Gordon Anderson	16 November 2006	4.00
18	5	"Episode 5"	Gordon Anderson	Catherine Tate, Aschlin Ditta & Gordon Anderson	23 November 2006	4.06
19	6	"Episode 6"	Gordon Anderson	Catherine Tate, Aschlin Ditta, Gordon Anderson & Jonathan Harvey	30 November 2006	4.15
Special
20	–	"Christmas Special"	Gordon Anderson	Catherine Tate, Derren Litten, Mathew Horne & Aschlin Ditta	25 December 2007	6.75

=== Catherine Tate's Nan (2009–2015) ===
No. overall	No. special	Title	Directed by	Written by	Original release date	UK viewers (millions)
21	1	"Nan's Christmas Carol"	Gordon Anderson	Catherine Tate, Aschlin Ditta & Gordon Anderson	25 December 2009	8.46
22	2	"Nan"	Geoff Posner	Catherine Tate, Brett Goldstein & Dan Swimmer	4 January 2014	4.47
23	3	"Nanger Management"	Geoff Posner	Catherine Tate, Brett Goldstein & Dan Swimmer	27 December 2015	3.14
24	4	"Knees Up Wilmott-Brown"	Geoff Posner	Catherine Tate, Brett Goldstein & Dan Swimmer	30 December 2015	2.97
