= The Nan Movie =

- Theatrical release poster
- Written by: Catherine Tate; Brett Goldstein
- Produced by: Damian Jones
- Starring: Catherine Tate; Mathew Horne; Katherine Parkinson; Parker Sawyers; Tom Vaughan-Lawlor; Jack Doolan; Niky Wardley
- Cinematography: Christos Karamanis
- Edited by: James Taylor; Liam Hendrix Heath
- Music by: Michael Bruce
- Production companies: Great Point Media; Lip Sync Productions; DJ Films; Merlin Films; Zahala Productions; Sulcata Productions; Tiger Aspect Productions (uncredited)
- Distributed by: Warner Bros. Pictures
- Release dates: 18 March 2022 (United Kingdom & Ireland)
- Running time: 95 minutes
- Countries: United Kingdom; Ireland
- Language: English
- Box office: $2.1 million

The Nan Movie is a 2022 comedy film written by Catherine Tate and Brett Goldstein. The film has no credited director; Josie Rourke, who was originally attached as director, is credited as executive producer. The film stars Tate and Mathew Horne. A British-Irish co-production, it is based on the television series, Catherine Tate's Nan, which is a set of four specials that were broadcast between 2009 and 2015, and itself is a spin-off of the television sketch series, The Catherine Tate Show (2004–2007). The film centres on the eponymous Nan character who travels cross-country to visit her dying sister, and includes several flashbacks to their upbringing and early adulthood.

== Plot ==
Foul-mouthed and cantankerous London woman Joanie "Nan" Taylor (Catherine Tate) is living her best life and her grandson, Jamie (Mathew Horne) now has a YouTube channel making short films. Nan receives a letter from her younger sister, Nell (Katherine Parkinson), who tells her she is dying. Jamie wants to go to see her but Nan is reluctant, however, when she gets an invite from her neighbours to have dinner with them (who Nan tells Jamie they are naturist) she decides to go see Nell. Jamie gets his craft van, which helps people with emotional difficulties, and he and Nan head to the island off of Ireland, but Nan would rather head to Coventry to spend her vouchers. During the journey Jamie asks why she and Nell fell out to which Nan tells him.

When she was young she and Nell got on really well until their father died. This meant the two of them had to go on his horse and cart and sell things, but when World War II happened things changed. One night in a club Joanie and Nell meet an American soldier called Walter (Parker Sawyers) and they are both immediately smitten with him. As time goes on Joanie and Nell try to get Walter to fall for them, but Nell gets between Joanie and Walter, and he falls for her. Later on Joanie receives a letter from Walter asking to meet him at a train station before he is called away, but shortly after Nell reveals she is expecting so when Joanie goes to meet Walter she rejects his feelings for her. The next day Terry Taylor (Jack Doolan), who has always loved Joanie, ask her to marry him and she accepts. After the war Nell marries Walter and tells Joanie that she wasn't really pregnant, she feigned it to get Walter. They fight and Joanie and Terry walk out on Nell.

Back on the road trip Jamie deliberately misses the turn-off to Coventry and ends up in Liverpool, where they are greeted by Officer Mahler (Niky Wardley) who used to work at the council before Nan caused her to be fired. In the hotel, Nan and Jamie are woken by a noisy party of Australians going on down stairs, which leads to Nan go clubbing with them; Jamie has to pull her away. The next morning the two head to what Nan thinks is Coventry but, whilst she is asleep, Jamie heads to a ferry to take them to Dublin, with Mahler following them.

When in Dublin, Nan makes friends with a man called Mick (Tom Vaughan-Lawlor) who she calls Mick, Mick, Mick because he has three Ms tattooed on him. In the van the three get really close, but on the radio they discover Mick is a vegan activist who helps animals escape slaughterhouses and the three Ms mean "Meat Means Murder." Mick uses the help of Nan and Jamie to sneak into a poultry farm with explosives to help the chickens escape. With Jamie distracting the guard, Nan and Mick blow up the slaughterhouse and escape, while Mahler was watching them the whole time.

Realising they are in a lot of trouble, Jamie tries to think what to do, but Nan telephones her Australian friends, who help them disguise the van and themselves. When cornered by the police, Mick decides to hand himself in, causing a distraction to let Nan, Jamie and the Aussies escape. However, Mahler is following them Jamie has to speed up and make a massive jump to catch the boat to the Island off of Ireland. They manage to make it, but Mahler falls in the water. On the boat, Nan reveals that she is jealous that Nell got Walter, but Jamie adds that she had a nice life with Terry.

When they finally reach Nell's, Nan agrees to see her. Inside, Nan is reluctant to see Walter, but discovers he dresses in women's clothes, which she finds hilarious because she thought they had the perfect life. Nan realises that she did love Terry and he was her true love. Jamie later joins them and they all reminisce about the old times. They soon make their goodbyes. Nell and Nan finally know that they both married the right men. Nan and Jamie decide to head home and Nan tells Jamie that she loves him and is proud of him.

Back in London, Nan heads back to her flat where they are greeted by their neighbours, who actually are naturists. They ask if Jamie and Nan would like to join them, to which Nan says her old catchphrase "What a fucking liberty."

== Cast ==
- Catherine Tate as Joanie Taylor
- Mathew Horne as Jamie
- Katherine Parkinson as Nell Taylor
- Niky Wardley as Officer Mahler
- Parker Sawyers as Walter
- Tom Vaughan-Lawlor as Mick
- Jack Doolan as Terry Taylor
- Claudie Blakley as Carolyn
- Richard Sandling as Colin
- Pete Bennett as Bradley
- Paul Reid as Nan's Dad
- Rosalie Craig as Nan's Mum
- Ruchika Jain as Nira
- Tim Laubscher as Nutsack
- Felix Scott as Arsemunch
- Paul Tylak as Officer Singh
- Rebecca Trehearn as Peggy Roberts

== Production ==
In early 2019, it was first announced that Catherine Tate would be reprising her role of Joanie Taylor, who first appeared in the sketch series, and subsequently, the spin-off series, for a feature film. The project, directed by Josie Rourke of the 2018 biographical drama, Mary Queen of Scots, announced via Instagram that the film would be titled This Nan's Life. Matthew Horne reprises his role as Nan's long-suffering grandson, Jamie, as well as Niky Wardley, another well-known performer within the original series, and Katherine Parkinson. The film is written by Tate and former collaborator Brett Goldstein. Warner Bros. holds the distribution rights in the United Kingdom.

After initial filming, the film was retooled substantially. The film largely took place in 1940s London. Those scenes were scaled back and new footage, greatly expanding the modern-day road trip sections, were filmed without Rourke at a low cost, with animation sequences also used to fill any gaps.

The film was scheduled to be released on 19 June 2020, but was indefinitely postponed due to cinemas being closed because of the COVID-19 pandemic. The trailer and poster for the film were released on 18 February 2022 with Josie Rourke receiving an executive producer credit and no director credited. The film was released on 18 March 2022. As a result of "technical reasons", Pete Bennett's role was reduced to a brief appearance.

== Reception ==
=== Box office ===
The Nan Movie was released on 18 March 2022 in 514 cinemas across the United Kingdom and Ireland. The film's theatrical gross on 4 May 2022 was $2,165,386.

=== Critical response ===
The film received a resoundingly negative reception from critics. On review aggregation website Rotten Tomatoes, The Nan Movie has an approval rating of 0%, based on 13 reviews. The Guardian described it as "brutally unfunny", giving it one star out of five, The Telegraph as being "as interminable as it is revolting", also awarding 1/5, while the monthly film magazine Empire was slightly more positive, calling it "a mostly unfunny attempt to wring long-form laughs from a character who works better in short doses", awarding 2/5.

Bleeding Cool commented on the film's disjointed narrative, with the flashback scenes described as "a thoughtful, beautifully shot period piece set in London during the war", while the much more dominant present-day plot is a "dull-looking road trip from London to Ireland filled with boring, tedious irrelevant distractions that hurt the brain." The site's original review of The Nan Movie was entitled "Finding A Much Better Film Within", and commented on how no director is credited despite collaboration from Josie Rourke, who has previously directed historical dramas and stage plays. The Guardian's critic also commented on the relative quality of the flashbacks as compared to the other material.

The later article states that, according to its sources, when the original cut of the film was presented to its backers in 2019, the backers were uncomfortable with the wartime storyline. They requested that it be heavily cut to accommodate much more of the present-day plot with the elderly Joan Taylor, whom fans of The Catherine Tate Show will recognise. A good deal more of this material was then cheaply and hastily shot to replace the cut footage. In a December 2022 The Times interview, Rourke said, "As a film-maker I had a sense of what I wanted [the film] to be, but I think in the end that wasn't mainstream enough for what people wanted. So I had to walk away. I think my main feeling about it is sadness."

=== Accolades ===
Award	Date of ceremony	Category	Recipient(s)	Result	Ref.
National Film Awards	4 July 2022	Best Comedy	The Nan Movie	Nominated	
National Film Awards	4 July 2022	Best Supporting Actor	Mathew Horne	Won	
National Film Awards	4 July 2022	Best Screenplay	Catherine Tate and Brett Goldstein	Nominated	
