= The Catherine Tate Show =

TV sketch comedy show

- Title card, as seen from Series 2 onwards.
- Genre: Sketch comedy
- Created by: Catherine Tate
- Written by: Catherine Tate; Derren Litten; Aschlin Ditta
- Directed by: Gordon Anderson
- Starring: Catherine Tate; Mathew Horne; Niky Wardley
- Theme music composer: Howard Goodall
- Opening theme: "In These Shoes?" by Kirsty MacColl (Series 1) "The Catherine Tate Show Theme" by Howard Goodall
- Country of origin: United Kingdom
- Original language: English
- No. of series: 3
- No. of episodes: 20 (+ 4 spin-off specials) (list of episodes)

Production
- Producers: Geoffrey Perkins (2004–2006); Sophie Clarke–Jervoise (2007–2009)
- Cinematography: John Sorapure; Jeremy Hewson; Rob Kitzmann
- Editors: Chris Wadsworth; Mykola Pawluk; Mark Lawrence; Billy Sneddon; Richard Halladey
- Camera setup: Multi-camera
- Running time: 30–50 minutes
- Production company: Tiger Aspect Productions

Original release
- Network: BBC Two (2004–2006, 2009); BBC One (2007, 2014–2015)
- Release: 16 February 2004 – 25 December 2007
- Release: 25 December 2009 – 30 December 2015

Related
- Catherine Tate's Nan

The Catherine Tate Show is a British television comedy sketch programme written by Catherine Tate and Derren Litten featuring a wide range of characters. The Catherine Tate Show aired on BBC Two and was shown worldwide through the BBC. Collectively, the show has been nominated for six BAFTA Awards, two British Comedy Awards and an Emmy Award, and it has won two Royal Television Society Awards, two British Comedy Awards and a National Television Award since its debut in 2004.

== Broadcast ==
The first series of the show, which consisted of six episodes, aired from 16 February to 22 March 2004. A DVD of this series was released in August 2005.

A second series aired from 21 July to 25 August 2005, and a 40-minute Christmas special aired on 20 December 2005. For this series a new theme tune was introduced. A DVD of series two was released in October 2006.

The third series aired from 14 October to 25 November 2006. There had been speculation that this would be the final series; however, Tate explained in an interview on This Morning that she had never said this and would like to at least make specials in the future.

Tate filmed a Christmas special which aired on 25 December 2007. Tate had announced that there would be no further series after the special; however, a Christmas special was shown on 25 December 2009. Another 30-minute episode involving the Nan character was shown in January 2014. Two new Christmas specials aired on 27 and 30 December 2015, again involving Nan. On 4 January 2016, Tate announced that she did not plan to make any more ‘specials’ as she was busy with other projects.

On 24 November 2018, during the Sydney show of her Australian tour at the State Theatre, Tate revealed that there would be another series of the show, though this has not yet materialised.

Series	Episodes	Originally released		
Series	Episodes	First released	Last released	Network
1	6	16 February 2004	22 March 2004	BBC Two
2	6	21 July 2005	25 August 2005	BBC Two
2	Special	20 December 2005		BBC Two
3	6	26 October 2006	30 November 2006	BBC Two
3	Special	25 December 2007		BBC One
Nan specials		25 December 2009	30 December 2015	BBC One

== Characters and sketches ==
This is only a small sample of descriptions of the most popular or well-known characters:

- Joanie "Nan" Taylor is a foul-mouthed grandmother who constantly swears at and criticises other people, especially when they are not present. These sketches always include her grandson Jamie (Mathew Horne). She often uses phrases such as, “What a load of ol' shit!". She is typically nice to visitors in a completely over-the-top manner, then, the instant they have departed, drops the façade and says, "What a fuckin' liberty!" in a disgusted manner (usually because of a completely spurious complaint). When her grandson takes her to a pound shop she asks the price of everything that takes her interest.
- Paul and Sam are a Thames Estuary/Essex couple played by Tate and former EastEnders actor Lee Ross, Sam comes home from work with ‘amazing’ tales of her mundane life at work and Paul hangs on to every word, getting as excited as she does over trivial things that they blow up out of all proportion. Their catchphrases include, "What am I like, What are you like" and "I dunno". In the third series Sam and Paul only appeared in the last episode due to Lee Ross' work on EastEnders as Owen.
- Lauren Cooper is an argumentative and lazy teenage school-girl who gets out of awkward situations by repeating her catchphrase, "Am I bovvered?" or "Look at my face, is my face bovvered? Face? Bovvered?" In 2006, this catchphrase was named Word of the Year and entered the Oxford English Dictionary. A spokesperson for the OED commented:
  "Am I bovvered?" and its follow-up, "Does my face looked bovvered?" had already come to be seen as the perfect expression of a generation of teenagers and their speaking style.
- In How Many, How Much two office workers, Kate and Ellen, who sit next to each other. While Ellen (played by Ella Kenion) is usually keen to get on with her work, she is frequently interrupted by Kate (Tate), who asks her to guess answers to questions and becomes angry when Ellen answers incorrectly; however, when Ellen then gives the right answer, Kate just says "...Yeah", insults her, and then gets back to work.
- The Aga Saga Woman is an upper middle class English woman who goes into a state of shock in various, seemingly harmless situations when confronted with people, places, or products, which are lower than her own social class. She has two children, Thomas and Chloe. She is identified as "Mrs Montgomery" in series 2 and later "Mrs Taylor-Thomas" in series 3.
- Derek Faye is a middle-aged "gentleman" who codes strongly as a gay bachelor. He lives with his elderly mother and "hasn't found the right girl yet." When well-meaning people reach out to Derek under the assumption he is gay he becomes extremely offended and defensive, dramatically exclaiming, "What on earth are you insinuating?", "How very dare you!" and "Who, dear? Me, dear? Gay, dear? No, dear."
- Elaine Figgis is a 34 year old woman who lives in York and works at a bakery. She exchanges online letters and falls in love with the cannibal, murderer and criminal Jeremiah Waynwright III, who awaits execution on Death Row in Texas.
- Janice and Ray are a couple from Beverley, East Riding of Yorkshire who express their disgust at the various signs of multi-culturalism in their very British circle. Sources of outrage include restaurant meals, due to their perception of over-pricing or the exotic nature of the food such as grapes in a brie cheese sandwich. They perceive global foods as adulterated British fare and view such culinary transgressions as personal affronts – finally responding with their catchphrase, “The dirty bastards!"
- Geordie Georgie is a frequent petitioner, always trying to get her co-worker, Martin, to sponsor "me and some of the girls" in her latest charitable endeavour. With facts such as "Every 38 minutes ..." she follows her statements up with "If you don't believe me then log on to the website w, w, w, dot...". When Martin offers some amount she invariably takes umbrage and berates him with further details of the people she is trying to help. After she accepts his second offer she does something – often assaults him – to "show him what it's like". Third series only.
- Ally is a tactless woman with good intentions who unfortunately is a perfect example of someone with foot-in-mouth syndrome. Unwittingly she offends all those she comes into contact with at parties, and then in an attempt to dig herself out of the hole she has created, only worsens the situation.
- Bernie is a vulgar Irish nurse with an infectious snort, who works at a hospital who is never shy from both saying it how it is, and from airing her personal problems or feelings with everyone and anyone, particularly the male patients and doctors.

== Television series ==
=== Series 1 (2004) ===
The first series of the show, which consisted of six episodes, aired from 16 February to 22 March 2004. The programme's theme tune for the first series was "In These Shoes?" by Kirsty MacColl, featured on her 2000 album Tropical Brainstorm.

In the months preceding the launch of the second series, BBC Two aired three "best of" episodes, featuring a variety of the funniest clips from the six episodes of series one, including Lauren Cooper the teenager and Joanie Taylor the foul-mouthed grandmother. Meanwhile, repeats of all six episodes of the first series aired on UKTV G2 (now Dave). Tate also appeared in a comedy sketch with boy band McFly (see charity sketches for details).

In 2004, Catherine Tate won a British Comedy Award for "Best Comedy Newcomer" for her work on the first series of The Catherine Tate Show.

=== Series 2 (2005) ===
The second series aired from 21 July to 25 August 2005. Following Tate's Comic Relief appearance with McFly, and speculation of her non-existent feud with David Schwimmer, it received slightly more publicity than series one in the run-up to the first episode. BBC Two also promoted the series by running trailers showing Lauren arguing with a furry dog in the shape of the channel's logo.

This series was far more successful with viewing figures than the first, securing ratings of 2.89 to 3.92 million, with the final episode receiving higher viewing figures than the episode of Extras which aired beforehand. Celebrities such as Peter Kay and Jill Halfpenny made guest appearances in series two. The series also had new theme music composed by Howard Goodall. For the opening, various characters are in an open field. The camera closes in on Lauren Cooper, zooms into her eye, then zooms out of Sheila Carter's eye. The camera pans to the right, where Bernie enters. The camera zooms into her eye, then zooms out of Nan's eye, where she is seen laughing. The end of the sequence shows the main title The Catherine Tate Show. The zooming is the same for both series two and three although Sheila Carter does not appear in series three (in the 2007 Christmas Special, Sheila is replaced by Geordie Georgie).

The second series began airing in Australia on 4 April 2007 on ABC TV. Before this the BBC-owned Australian cable channel BBC UKTV had aired the complete series starting in 2004. The re-runs of the series were shown starting from 6 May 2007.

In November 2005, Tate appeared in the 77th Royal Variety Performance in the guise of teenager Lauren Cooper, accompanied by Lauren's friends, Ryan and Liese. After Lauren embarrassed herself in front of the audience, Ryan pointed out that the Queen was laughing at her. Looking up at the Royal Box, she asked, "Are you disrespecting me?" and mimicked the Queen's accent, asking, "Is one bovvered? Is one's face bovvered?", before adding, "Who is looking after the corgis?" The Queen was seen laughing at this joke, and Prince Philip also appeared to take this in good humour. There were, however, reports that the Prince was extremely unimpressed by the performance and complained to the show's executive producer. She also appeared as Lauren in a special sketch for the BBC's annual Children in Need telethon. The segment was a crossover with EastEnders (see charity sketches for details).

A Christmas show was aired on 20 December 2005. It featured appearances from celebrity guests Richard Park, Charlotte Church and Chas & Dave. During the show, Paul and Sam's two children were seen for the first time: they looked and acted exactly like their parents. The characters of Margaret and the enigmatic detective, who did not appear in series two, made appearances in the Christmas special. According to BARB's official viewing figures, over 5.66 million viewers watched the show, making it the most-watched programme at the time and the most watched programme on BBC Two the week it was aired. The show was also nominated for the People's Choice Award at the British Comedy Awards in 2005, but did not win after it was announced that the show had received fewer votes than Ant and Dec's Saturday Night Takeaway. In an investigation, it was revealed in May 2008 that The Catherine Tate Show was the true winner of the British Comedy Award, and that Ant and Dec were wrongly awarded; Tate had actually received more votes from the public. A report by independent law firm, Olswang, said "Robbie Williams was invited to present an award. It was understood that he would be happy [to do so] if the recipients were Anthony McPartlin and Declan Donnelly. In order to ensure his attendance, this assurance was given"; however, it is not known if Williams' comments led to the wrong announcement. It was also exposed that the second half of the ceremony was not broadcast live but with a delay of half-an-hour, yet viewers were still encouraged to vote for the People's Choice Award, even though the votes had been counted and the trophy presented half-an-hour before.

The second series started airing on UKTV G2 in January 2006. Series one continued on UKTV Gold. The second series was also being screened on BBC America, and repeated on BBC Two, from June 2006. Following the success of series two, Tate launched a range of merchandise based on characters from the show in 2006. In September 2006 The Catherine Tate Show official calendar 2007 was released. Also, on 2 October 2006 a book was released of the scripts of both series one and two, called Am I Bovvered The Catherine Tate Show Scripts.

On 13 December 2006, Tate won another British Comedy Award for "Best TV Comedy Actress" for her work in the second series of The Catherine Tate Show.

=== Series 3 (2006) ===
The third series started on 26 October 2006 and ran until 25 November 2006. Before the launch of the series, it had been reported that BBC One controller Peter Fincham hoped to lure Tate to the channel; however, she decided to stay with BBC Two, where she would not be as pressured to secure higher ratings.

The series gained strong viewing figures for BBC Two, ranging from 4.00 to 4.92 million, becoming the top show on BBC Two each week. There were many more guest appearances in the third series which included Paul O'Grady being featured in a sketch with Joanie "Nan" Taylor when she appeared on The Paul O'Grady Show.

=== Specials (2007) ===
On 19 February 2007, Tate appeared again on This Morning and stated that a forty-minute Comic Relief special had been made, which aired on 16 March 2007. Several sketches were interspersed throughout the Comic Relief programme, with guests such as the prime minister at the time, Tony Blair (see charity sketches for details). Kim Cattrall has also expressed an interest in appearing on an episode of the show. Cattrall commented that she is a "huge fan" and would like to be given a role.

Tate has revealed that she is considering taking the characters from the show on the road for a UK stage tour. Series Three was released on DVD on 12 November 2007. On 31 October 2007 The Catherine Tate Show won the National Television Award for most popular comedy as voted for by the public.

A new Christmas special episode aired on 25 December 2007 on BBC One, in which pop star George Michael made a guest appearance. He was featured in several scenes with Irish nurse, Bernie, including one kissing scene. The character of Lauren was killed in a kayaking accident during the episode. Rumours had emerged about this story line in July 2007. Kathy Burke, Tamzin Outhwaite and Kellie Bright also guest starred, and the special averaged with 6.4 million viewers.

The episode was subject to criticism when some viewers complained about the amount of swearing, and accused Tate of bigotry over the depiction of a family from Northern Ireland as terrorists, whose Christmas presents included a balaclava and a pair of knuckle dusters, in reference to The Troubles. A statement was issued from the BBC that read "Catherine Tate creates characters who are so over the top as to be almost cartoon-like and this is where her genius lies. Her comedy is never meant to offend any viewer and is always based on satire and grotesque exaggeration."

After the complaints were made, an Ofcom report later concluded that the show was not offensive and did not violate broadcasting regulations. An extract from the Ofcom report read "Overall this episode was typical of the Catherine Tate Show and would not have gone beyond the expectations of its usual audience. For those not familiar with the show, the information given at the start was adequate."

During Tate's appearance on The Paul O'Grady Show on 24 September 2007, Tate did not make a reference to the speculation of there being any more series, but she did state that she may just continue her work on The Catherine Tate Show through one-off specials. It has since been announced by Tate that she does not plan any more series after the Christmas special. She commented: "It's hard to keep coming up with ideas. And I'd like to stay in people's good graces, rather than, 'Oh no, she's not doing another series of that, is she?'" Tate also left to concentrate on other projects such as her role as Donna Noble, in series four of Doctor Who.

== Spin-offs ==
=== Nan's Christmas Carol (2009) ===
The BBC confirmed that a new Christmas special would be broadcast in December 2009, titled Nan's Christmas Carol, featuring Tate's Nan character as Scrooge. The special guest stars Mathew Horne (reprising his role as Nan's grandson Jamie) and Ben Miller, David Tennant and Roger Lloyd-Pack as ghosts. Niky Wardley who played many various characters mainly Lisa Jackson, also returned as Joanie Taylor's mother. Despite this special, shown on 25 December 2009, Tate has reiterated that she has no plans for the show to make a full return.

=== Catherine Tate's Nan (2014–2015) ===
In 2013, a new New Year's special was produced and was broadcast on 4 January 2014. The story features Nan as she is accompanied by a school girl named Alice, who has volunteered to visit Nan as part of the 'Young and Old Buddy-Up Foundation' while her grandson, Jamie is in Africa helping to build a school for orphans and keeps in contact with Nan regularly via Skype. As Nan's tap is broken, she and Alice head to the council to see if they can get someone to fix and there Nan land herself in trouble for 'disturbing the peace and simulating a heart attack' at the local community centre. Returning guest stars include Mathew Horne and Niky Wardley and with Ami Metcalf as Alice.

In 2015, it was announced that two new 'Nan' specials had been produced and these were broadcast in December that year. The first special aired on 27 December 2015 and the second on 30 December 2015.

==== The Nan Movie ====
In early 2019, an announcement was made that Catherine Tate's Nan would be developed into a feature film adaptation. In September 2019, it was confirmed that the film would receive a release sometime during 2020. Alongside Tate, it was also confirmed that Matthew Horne would be returning as Jamie, and that fellow co-star of the original series, Niky Wardley, would also appear. It was released on 18 March 2022, to overwhelmingly negative reviews. Josie Rourke, who was initially confirmed as the director of the film in 2019, was not credited.

=== Charity sketches ===
Tate appeared on the BBC's Comic Relief telethon in March 2005, in the guise of Lauren Cooper. In a section of the show, which featured fans of McFly asking questions to the group, Lauren decides to ask, "Why are you so rubbish?" When told by Simon Amstell, who is hosting the segment, that only positive questions are allowed, Lauren uses a variety of her catchphrases, including "Am I bovvered?" and "Are you calling me stupid?" Lauren is then "ordered" to ask a more positive question to the group, and confuses them with Busted, asking, "Are you gutted that Charlie left?" When told to leave the set, on her way out she asks Danny Jones from McFly to sign her knee, walking away promptly saying "You can't even spell."

In November 2005, Tate appeared as Lauren in a special sketch for the BBC's annual Children in Need telethon. The segment is posed as a crossover with EastEnders, featuring Barbara Windsor as Peggy Mitchell, Kacey Ainsworth as Little Mo and Lacey Turner as Stacey Slater. The sketch sees Lauren arrive in Walford in search of revenge on Stacey, who has apparently stolen her boyfriend. When she makes an appearance in the Queen Vic, Peggy finds herself getting increasingly frustrated with Lauren, who asks, "Are you a Cockney? Are you a Cockney sparrow?" (pronounced 'Cock-er-ney') and "Do you know Chas & Dave? Are you their mum?" repeatedly. Peggy also unintentionally uses some of Lauren's catchphrases, such as "Are you disrespecting my family?" and "Are you calling me a pikey?" Lauren eventually leaves the pub after mixing some famous lines from the soap, including "Hello princess" and "Rickaay!" with her usual catchphrase, "Bovvered?".

In the BBC's Sport Relief, Tate created a sketch as "Nan", commenting on the 1966 World Cup win and the comments of Kenneth Wolstenholme. The sketch involves "Nan" and her grandson watching a David Beckham football game, where she expresses her disgust at the objective of football by exclaiming "What a load of old shit!".

On 16 March 2007, Catherine Tate appeared on Red Nose Day 2007 as many of her well-known characters from the show. The sketches were interspersed throughout the Comic Relief programme. Guests in sketches include David Tennant (who acts as Lauren Cooper's teacher and actually turns out to be the real Doctor), and Daniel Craig as another one of Elaine Figgis' boyfriends whom she has met through the internet. This sketch also spawned a popular internet meme "Do you fancy Billie Piper, sir?" Tony Blair - whilst still Prime Minister - made a cameo appearance in a sketch, which features Lauren Cooper on work experience at 10 Downing Street. Upon Lauren attempting to tell Blair who the most famous person she has met is, he asks her if he is "bovvered". Geordie Georgie appeared with Lenny Henry when he does his own fund raising for Comic Relief, and Joanie Taylor also appeared on game show Deal or No Deal hosted by Noel Edmonds. The DVD of the sketches was available exclusively to Amazon and became the most pre-ordered DVD the site has ever seen.

On 13 March 2009, Nan appeared on the 2009 Comic Relief. She was receiving a cheque for her Community Centre from Fern Britton and Alan Carr. She was then disgusted that she only got £1000.

Year	Event	Character	Guest Star(s)
2005	Comic Relief	Lauren Cooper	McFly, Simon Amstell
2005	Children in Need	Lauren Cooper	Barbara Windsor, Lacey Turner, Kacey Ainsworth
2006	Sport Relief	Joanie Taylor	David Beckham
2007	Comic Relief	Lauren Cooper	David Tennant
2007	Comic Relief	Bernie	George Michael
2007	Comic Relief	Elaine Figgis	Daniel Craig
2007	Comic Relief	Lauren Cooper	Tony Blair
2007	Comic Relief	Geordie Georgie	Lenny Henry
2007	Comic Relief	Joanie Taylor	Noel Edmonds
2009	Comic Relief	Joanie Taylor	Fern Britton, Alan Carr
2010	Channel 4's Comedy Gala	Joanie Taylor	Introducing Noel Fielding
2013	Children in Need 2013	Joanie Taylor	Cast of Holby City and Mathew Horne
2017	Let's Sing and Dance (Comic Relief)	Joanie Taylor	Matthew Horne, Len Goodman, Bonnie Tyler and Richard E. Grant
2017	Red Nose Day 2017: Make Your Laugh Matter	Lauren Cooper	Lenny Henry and Warwick Davis
2020	The Big Night In	Lauren Cooper	David Tennant

== Live show ==
On 27 April 2016, Tate announced she would be taking her characters on tour later the same year. She performed in theatres across the UK between 31 October and 4 December 2016. Tate was joined on stage by long time collaborators Niky Wardley and Mathew Horne as well as actor and comedian Brett Goldstein playing various characters. The show also featured pre-recorded cutaway cameos by Billy Connolly (as God & the Devil), Richard Sandling (as Steve) and Nick Grimshaw (as himself).

On 17 October 2018, it was announced that the show would run in London's West End at the Wyndham's Theatre for one week from 7 to 12 January 2019. On 29 October 2018, tickets for shows were added due to popular demand.

The Catherine Tate Show Live
Date	City	Country	Venue
31 October 2016	York	England	Barbican Centre
1 November 2016	Manchester	England	O2 Apollo
2 November 2016	Basingstoke	England	The Anvil
3 November 2016	Sheffield	England	City Hall
4 November 2016	Leicester	England	De Montfort Hall
5 November 2016	Southend	England	Cliffs Pavilion
7 November 2016	Edinburgh	Scotland	Playhouse
8 November 2016	Glasgow	Scotland	Clyde Auditorium
9 November 2016	Newcastle	England	City Hall
10 November 2016	Coventry	England	Warwick Arts Centre
11 November 2016	Leeds	England	First Direct Arena
13 November 2016	London	England	Eventim Apollo
14 November 2016	London	England	Eventim Apollo
15 November 2016	Plymouth	England	Plymouth Pavilions
16 November 2016	Bournemouth	England	Bournemouth International Centre
17 November 2016	Cardiff	Wales	Cardiff International Arena
18 November 2016	Northampton	England	Royal & Derngate
19 November 2016	Portsmouth	England	Guildhall
21 November 2016	Leicester	England	De Montfort Hall
22 November 2016	Liverpool	England	Liverpool Empire Theatre
23 November 2016	Oxford	England	New Theatre
24 November 2016	Brighton	England	Brighton Centre
25 November 2016	Nottingham	England	Royal Concert Hall
26 November 2016	Nottingham	England	Royal Concert Hall
28 November 2016	Southend	England	Cliffs Pavilion
29 November 2016	Ipswich	England	Regent Theatre
30 November 2016	Birmingham	England	Barclaycard Arena
1 December 2016	Llandudno	Wales	Venue Cymru
2 December 2016	Wolverhampton	England	Civic Hall
3 December 2016	Bristol	England	Colston Hall
4 December 2016	Bristol	England	Colston Hall
7 January 2019	London	England	Wyndham's Theatre
8 January 2019	London	England	Wyndham's Theatre
9 January 2019	London	England	Wyndham's Theatre
10 January 2019	London	England	Wyndham's Theatre
11 January 2019	London	England	Wyndham's Theatre
12 January 2019 (matinee)	London	England	Wyndham's Theatre
12 January 2019 (evening)	London	England	Wyndham's Theatre
14 January 2019	London	England	Wyndham's Theatre
15 January 2019	London	England	Wyndham's Theatre
16 January 2019	London	England	Wyndham's Theatre
17 January 2019	London	England	Wyndham's Theatre
18 January 2019	London	England	Wyndham's Theatre
19 January 2019 (matinee)	London	England	Wyndham's Theatre
19 January 2019 (evening)	London	England	Wyndham's Theatre

== Reception ==
=== Ratings ===
Series	Timeslot	Ep	First aired		Last aired		Rank	Avg. viewers (millions)
Series	Timeslot	Ep	Date	Viewers (millions)	Date	Viewers (millions)	Rank	Avg. viewers (millions)
1	Monday 10:00 pm (1–5), 9:30 pm (6)	6	16 February 2004	<2.40	22 March 2004	<2.20	N/A	N/A
2	Thursday 9:30 pm	6	21 July 2005	3.50	25 August 2005	3.92	4	3.39
3	Thursday 9:00 pm	6	26 October 2006	4.81	30 November 2006	4.15	1	4.37

=== Awards and nominations ===
Year	Award	Category	Nominee(s)	Result	Ref.
2004	Banff Rockie Awards	Best Comedy	The Catherine Tate Show	Won	
2004	British Comedy Awards	Best Comedy Newcomer	Catherine Tate	Won	
2004	British Comedy Awards	Best TV Comedy Actress	Catherine Tate	Nominated	
2004	RTS Craft & Design Awards	Make Up Design - Entertainment & Non Drama	Vanessa White	Nominated	
2005	BAFTA TV Awards	Comedy - Programme or Series	Geoffrey Perkins, Gordon Anderson, Catherine Tate	Nominated	
2005	BAFTA TV Craft Awards	New Writer	Derren Litten	Nominated	
2005	British Comedy Awards	Best TV Comedy	The Catherine Tate Show	Nominated	
2005	British Comedy Awards	Best TV Comedy Actress	Catherine Tate	Nominated	
2005	British Comedy Awards	People's Choice Award	The Catherine Tate Show	Won	
2005	International Emmy Awards	Best Performance by an Actress	Catherine Tate	Nominated	
2005	RTS Awards	Network Newcomer - On Screen	Catherine Tate	Won	
2006	BAFTA TV Awards	Best Comedy Programme or Series	The Catherine Tate Show	Nominated	
2006	BAFTA TV Awards	Best Comedy Performance	Catherine Tate	Nominated	
2006	British Comedy Awards	Best TV Comedy Actress	Catherine Tate	Won	
2006	National Television Awards	Most Popular Comedy Programme	The Catherine Tate Show	Nominated	
2006	RTS Craft & Design Awards	Make Up Design - Entertainment & Non Drama	Neill Gorton, Vanessa White	Won	
2006	RTS Awards	Comedy Performance	Catherine Tate	Won	
2006	RTS Awards	Entertainment	The Catherine Tate Show	Won	
2007	BAFTA TV Awards	Comedy Programme	Gordon Anderson, Aschlin Ditta, Geoffrey Perkins, Catherine Tate	Nominated	
2007	BAFTA TV Craft Awards	Make-up And Hair Design	Vanessa White, Neill Gorton	Nominated	
2007	British Comedy Awards	Best TV Comedy Actress	Catherine Tate	Nominated	
2007	National Television Awards	Most Popular Comedy Programme	The Catherine Tate Show	Won	
2007	Nickelodeon Kids' Choice Awards	Funniest Person	Catherine Tate	Nominated	
2008	Nickelodeon Kids' Choice Awards	Favourite Funny Person	Catherine Tate	Nominated	

== Guest stars ==
Series 2

- Brian Murphy – with Irene and Vern
- Geraldine McNulty – with Paul and Sam
- Jill Halfpenny – with The Aga Saga Woman
- Michael Brandon – with Boob Job Babe
- Paul Whitehouse – with Paul and Sam
- Peter Kay – with Joanie "Nan" Taylor
- Roger Allam – with Bernie
- Siobhan Redmond – with Gingers For Justice
- Una Stubbs – with Trudy and Ivan

Series 3

- Bonnie Langford – with Derek Faye
- Jools Holland – with Helen Marsh
- Rhona Martin – with Helen Marsh
- Leslie Phillips – with Joanie "Nan" Taylor
- Natalie Cassidy – with Lauren Cooper
- Nick Sidi – with Derek Faye
- Patsy Palmer – with Gingers For Justice
- Paul O'Grady – with Joanie "Nan" Taylor
- Sheila Hancock – with Joanie "Nan" Taylor
- Siobhan Redmond – with Gingers For Justice
- Tom Ellis – with Ma Willow
- Una Stubbs – with Ma Willow
- Dominic West – with Frankie Howerd impressionist

Christmas specials

- Colin Morgan – John Leary (with the O'Leary family)
- Charlotte Church – with Joanie "Nan" Taylor
- Chas & Dave – with Joanie "Nan" Taylor
- David Tennant – with Joanie "Nan" Taylor
- George Michael – with Bernie
- Kathy Burke – with Joanie "Nan" Taylor
- Philip Glenister – with Ma Willow
- Richard Park – with Lauren Cooper
- Tamzin Outhwaite – with Paul and Sam
- Kellie Bright — with Paul and Sam

Charity sketches

- Daniel Craig – with Elaine Figgis
- David Tennant – with Lauren Cooper
- Lenny Henry – with Geordie Georgie
- Kacey Ainsworth – with Lauren Cooper
- McFly – with Lauren Cooper
- Noel Edmonds – with Joanie "Nan" Taylor
- Barbara Windsor – with Lauren Cooper
- Simon Amstell – with Lauren Cooper
- Lacey Turner – with Lauren Cooper
- Tony Blair – with Lauren Cooper
- Alan Carr and Fern Britton – with Joanie "Nan" Taylor

== Home media ==
=== Books ===
- Am I Bovvered The Catherine Tate Show Scripts (2005)

=== DVD releases ===
The entire series of The Catherine Tate Show has been released in the United Kingdom, from 2Entertain, and Australia, from Roadshow Entertainment. Series one, two and three are available in individual sets, while a set containing the first two series is also available, as well as a box set comprising all three series. The show's first Christmas special (2005) was released along with the second series set in both UK and Australia, whereas the second Christmas special (2007), was made available in the UK only in a stand alone DVD, while it was included with the third series DVD in Australia.

In the United States, where the series was released via SRO/Kulter, series one, two, and the 2005 Christmas special are only available in individual sets.

DVD overview
Title	Release date			Features
Title	Region 1	Region 2	Region 4	Features
Series One	25 September 2007	22 August 2005	7 November 2007	6 episodes; 1 disc; 16:9 aspect ratio (R2 & 4); 4:3 aspect ratio (R1); English Stereo 2.0; English subtitles (SDH); BBFC rating: 15; ACB rating: M; Special features: 2005 Comic Relief appearance; Interview with Catherine Tate on the characters; (No subtitles or special features on Region 1 & 4)
Series Two	25 March 2008	30 October 2006	18 April 2007	6 episodes; 1 disc; 16:9 aspect ratio (R2 & 4); 4:3 aspect ratio (R1); English Stereo 2.0; English subtitles (SDH); BBFC rating: 15; ACB rating: MA15+; Special features: 2005 Christmas Special (R2 & 4); Character Sketch Select (R2); (No subtitles on Region 1 & 4); (No special features on Region 1)
Series One and Two	—N/a	30 October 2006	5 September 2007	12 episodes; 2 disc; 16:9 aspect ratio; English Stereo 2.0; English subtitles (SDH); BBFC rating: 15; ACB rating: MA15+; Special features: 2005 Comic Relief appearance (R2); Interview with Catherine Tate on the characters (R2); 2005 Christmas Special (R2 & 4); Character Sketch Select (R2); (No subtitles on Region 4)
Christmas Show	28 October 2008	(On Series 2 DVD)	(On Series 2 DVD)	1 episode; 1 disc; 16:9 aspect ratio; English Stereo 2.0; (No subtitles or special features)
Comic Relief Special	—N/a	23 April 2007	—N/a	1 disc; 16:9 aspect ratio; English Stereo 2.0; BBFC rating: 15; (No subtitles)
Series Three	—N/a	12 November 2007	1 July 2008	6 episodes; 2 disc; 16:9 aspect ratio; English Stereo 2.0; English subtitles (SDH); BBFC rating: 15; ACB rating: M; Special features: Select Scenes with Commentary (R2); Character Sketch Selection (R2); 2007 Christmas Special (R4); (No subtitles on Region 4)
Complete Series One, Two & Three	—N/a	12 November 2007	2 April 2009	18 episodes; 3 discs; 16:9 aspect ratio; English Stereo 2.0; English subtitles (SDH); BBFC rating: 15; ACB rating: MA15+; Special features: 2005 Comic Relief appearance (R24); Interview with Catherine Tate on the characters (R2); 2005 Christmas Special (R2 & 4); Character Sketch Select (R2); Select Scenes with Commentary (R2); 2007 Christmas Special (R4); (No subtitles on Region 4)
Christmas Special	—N/a	26 December 2007	(On Series 3 DVD)	1 episode; 1 disc; 16:9 aspect ratio; English Stereo 2.0; English subtitles (SDH); BBFC rating: 15; Special features: Behind the Scenes Documentary; 2007 Colic Relief Sketches: featuring Tony Blair, Daniel Craig, David Tennant, Noel Edmonds, Lenny Henry
Nan Specials
Nan's Christmas Carol	—N/a	29 November 2010	—N/a	1 episode; 1 disc; 16:9 aspect ratio; English Stereo 2.0; English subtitles (SDH); BBFC rating: 15
Nan – The Specials	—N/a	18 January 2016	—N/a	4 episodes; 1 disc; 16:9 aspect ratio; English Stereo 2.0; English subtitles (SDH); BBFC rating: 15
