= The Big Night In =

2020 UK telethon for COVID-19 pandemic

- Genre: Telethon
- Created by: Children in Need; Comic Relief
- Presented by: Lenny Henry; Matt Baker; Davina McCall; Zoe Ball; Paddy McGuinness
- Starring: See below
- Country of origin: United Kingdom
- Original language: English

Production
- Executive producers: Peter Davey; Colin Hopkins
- Producer: Peter Davey
- Production locations: Studio V, Broadcasting House, London
- Running time: 3:00:00
- Production company: BBC Studios

Original release
- Network: BBC One
- Release: 23 April 2020

The Big Night In is a British telethon that was broadcast by BBC One from 7pm to 10pm on 23 April 2020 . It was the first joint initiative between two BBC telethon charities, Children in Need and Comic Relief. By the end of the programme, over £27.3 million had been raised. The British government promised to match all public donations if the minimum of £20 million was reached.

== Personnel ==
The telethon's showrunner and executive producer for the BBC was Peter Davey. The presenters, using The One Show's studio in Broadcasting House, London, included Lenny Henry, with Matt Baker and Davina McCall for the first hour and Zoe Ball and Paddy McGuinness from 8 pm. They maintained social distancing, while everyone else appearing live took part remotely, via video links. There were pre-recorded comedy appearances by Steve Coogan, Rob Brydon, Jack Whitehall, Catherine Tate, Romesh Ranganathan, Miranda Hart and others, as well as solo music performances from Sam Smith and Celeste.

Prince William, Duke of Cambridge made a surprise appearance, in a sketch with Stephen Fry, shown just before the 8 pm Clap for Our Carers.

== Line-up ==
Featured performances included:

- Miranda Hart and the cast of Miranda.
- Sam Smith performing "Lay Me Down"
- A lockdown sermon by The Vicar of Dibley featuring Dawn French
- Tess Daly and Claudia Winkleman's Strictly Come Dancing choreography challenge
- Stephen Fry as Lord Melchett (Blackadder), in conversation with Prince William, Duke of Cambridge
- Catherine Tate and David Tennant in "Lauren the 'Am I Bovvered' teenager gets home-schooled" (a sequel to a skit the two made for the 2007 Comic Relief telethon)
- Premiere of the video for Live Lounge Allstars' cover version of Foo Fighters' "Times Like These"
- Romesh Ranganathan's Isolation Diary
- A virtual EastEnders pub quiz hosted by Ian Beale (Adam Woodyatt) with a crossover appearance from Coronation Street's Liz McDonald (Beverley Callard)
- Actors who have played the title role in Doctor Who (original and new series) saluting NHS health workers
- Little Mix offering a prize of a backstage visit to their new TV show, Little Mix The Search
- Matt Lucas and the BBC Concert Orchestra performing "Thank You Baked Potato"
- Sports stars undertaking the "spin challenge"
- Celeste performing a cover of Bill Withers' "Lean On Me"
- Jack Whitehall in Bad Education with Matthew Horne and Anthony Joshua
- Peter Kay and the British public remake the "Is This the Way to Amarillo" video
- Joe Wicks' exercise secrets
- The cast of People Just Do Nothing on a video call, in character
- Stand-up at home from Jason Manford, Rosie Jones, Tim Vine, Tez Ilyas, Dane Baptiste, Russell Kane, Lost Voice Guy, Nish Kumar and more
- Steve Coogan and Rob Brydon in The Trip
- David Walliams, Matt Lucas, Anthony Head, Ruth Jones and the voice of Tom Baker in the first televisual Little Britain sketches for over a decade
- Liam Payne, Olly Murs, Leona Lewis, Nicole Scherzinger, Freya Ridings, Katherine Jenkins, Alfie Boe, Gregory Porter, Andrew Lloyd Webber and more join Gary Barlow to perform "Sing"

There were also appearances from Jenna Coleman, Tim Cook, Judi Dench, Sting, Rishi Sunak and others, with some repeating the UK government's directives for behaviour during the lockdown.
