= Swimming with Men =

- Theatrical release poster
- Directed by: Oliver Parker
- Screenplay by: Aschlin Ditta
- Based on: Allt flyter
- Produced by: Stewart Le Marechal; Anna Mohr-Pietsch; Maggie Monteith
- Starring: Rob Brydon; Jane Horrocks; Rupert Graves; Daniel Mays; Adeel Akhtar; Thomas Turgoose; Jim Carter
- Cinematography: David Raedeker
- Edited by: Liana Del Giudice
- Music by: Charlie Mole
- Production companies: Met Film Production; Dignity Film Finance; Shoebox Films; Amp Film; Kerris Films; Umedia
- Distributed by: Vertigo Releasing
- Release date: 6 July 2018 (United Kingdom)
- Running time: 96 minutes
- Country: United Kingdom
- Language: English

Swimming with Men is a 2018 British sports comedy-drama film starring Rob Brydon, Jane Horrocks, Rupert Graves, Daniel Mays, Thomas Turgoose, Jim Carter, Adeel Akhtar and Charlotte Riley. It was directed by Oliver Parker.

Screenwriter Aschlin Ditta based the script on the 2010 Swedish documentary Men Who Swim.

== Plot ==
When accountant Eric seeks to win back his wife Heather, he stumbles upon a solution in the form of a male synchronised swimming team: Men Who Swim. Joining his local team, Eric finds brotherhood in this crew as they train for the World Championships in Milan.

== Cast ==
- Rob Brydon as Eric Scott
- Jane Horrocks as Heather Scott
- Rupert Graves as Luke
- Daniel Mays as Colin
- Adeel Akhtar as Kurt
- Thomas Turgoose as Tom
- Jim Carter as Ted
- Charlotte Riley as Susan
- Nathaniel Parker as Lewis

== Production ==
The scenes from the championship competition were filmed at the 25 x 50 metre pool in Basildon Sporting Village.

== Release ==
The film closed the Edinburgh International Film Festival on 1 July 2018. It went on general release in the UK on 4 July.

== Reception ==
On the review aggregator website Rotten Tomatoes, 54% of 46 critics' reviews are positive, with an average rating of 5.2/10. The website's consensus reads: "Swimming with Men touches on thought-provoking themes surrounding modern masculinity, but ultimately never manages to do much more than tread water." Metacritic, which uses a weighted average, assigned the film a score of 44 out of 100, based on 11 critics, indicating "mixed or average" reviews.

Peter Bradshaw of The Guardian gave the film 3/5 stars. Empire gave it two stars and compared it unfavorably to The Full Monty.

== See also ==
- Allt flyter, a similar film from 2008
- Sink or Swim, a similar film from 2018
