= Zapped (TV series) =

- Written by: Dan Gaster; Will Ing; Paul Powell
- Directed by: Dave Lambert
- Starring: James Buckley; Paul Kaye; Sharon Rooney; Kenneth Collard; Louis Emerick; Sally Phillips
- Country of origin: United Kingdom
- Original language: English
- No. of series: 3
- No. of episodes: 15

Production
- Running time: 30 to 40 minutes
- Production company: Baby Cow Productions

Original release
- Network: Dave
- Release: 13 October 2016 – 21 November 2018

Zapped is a British television sitcom, set in both the real world and a fantasy world, with the majority of characters and stories wholly set in the latter. It stars James Buckley as Brian Weaver, a real world inhabitant who becomes trapped in Munty, a town in the fantasy world.

Buckley announced during a live stream on 8 February 2019 that the show had been cancelled and he would not be making any more episodes.

In February 2021, all episodes of the show were added to BBC iPlayer, however they were subsequently removed and are no longer available to view.

== Plot ==
Brian is an office worker in West London who reluctantly takes delivery of a package addressed to someone in a place called Munty. He opens it, puts on the amulet within, and is teleported to the medieval setting of Munty. The three episodes of series one focuses on his attempts to get back to the real world. He is not missed by his real world colleagues, who detest him.

== Setting ==
Munty is a place in a fantasy universe, where magic is a real force, but one closely controlled by a police state. The enforcers of the state are "fairies", who are the opposite of the traditional image of the fairy - they are big, burly, thuggish men.

The stories are mostly set in and around the town pub (The Jug and the Other Jug) and a nearby shop. They revolve around Brian's attempts to get home and his interactions with his newfound friends. Brian does not gel with his new surroundings and does not fit in, notably remaining in his real world clothes throughout.

== Cast and characters ==
=== Main characters ===
- James Buckley as Brian Weaver, a former office worker and loser from the real world who is now trapped in Munty.
- Louis Emerick as Herman, the landlord and only barkeep of a tavern in Munty where most of the series takes place. Herman is a retired swordsman and veteran of the Mage Wars, and still keeps the heads of ogres and unicorns he killed on the walls of the tavern.
- Kenneth Collard as Steg Steggson, a half-giant half-dwarf Munty resident, and one of Herman's few regular patrons. Steg considers himself a 'champion of the people' and a force for progress and social justice, although the causes he regularly takes up are often ridiculous or inconsequential.
- Paul Kaye as Howell, a disgraced former grand wizard who now owns a magic emporium near to the tavern, which he frequently visits. Howell funds his substance abuse issues and alcoholism with various dodgy schemes.
- Sharon Rooney as Barbara, another tavern regular, is an apprentice soothsayer with an unrequited affection for Brian. A running joke is that her predictions and prophecies often initially appear vastly incompetent, but actually turn out true in the end, although nobody realises.

=== Recurring and supporting characters ===
- Steve Coogan as Feffenhoffer, a sadistic circus master.
- Phil Daniels as the Warden of the Pear Orchard.
- Kathryn Drysdale as Lorelei, a mermaid.
- Tim FitzHigham as Fenton Breem, Munty's premier musician and playwright.
- Martin Glyn Murray as Greg.
- Ricky Grover as Hawthorn, a fairy.
- Miranda Hennessy as Effandra.
- Tim Key as Sextus.
- Guz Khan as Skylark, a fairy.
- Sylvester McCoy as The Protector.
- Sally Phillips as Slasher Morgan, a criminal who often deals with Howell.
- Jessica Ransom as Jess, a real world office worker.
- Rufus Hound as Kevlar.
- Richard Sandling as Springleaf, a fairy.
- Nina Wadia as the Judge.
- Tony Way as Chestnut, a fairy.
- Susan Wokoma as Rina.

== Episodes ==
=== Series 1 (2016) ===
No.	Title	Original release date
1	"Mr Weaver"	13 October 2016
When Brian finds a magical amulet it transports him to Munty, a strange land peopled by even stranger creatures. Before he can use the amulet to return home a wizard called Howell sells it to a criminal mastermind - Slasher Morgan.
2	"Mr Charisma"	20 October 2016
Howell has concocted a charisma potion that can charm people into giving you whatever you want. Brian could use it to retrieve the amulet, but Steg wants to woo a lonely Demi-Fin with it and Barbara needs it to enter the elite Seers Guild.
3	"Mr Wuffles"	27 October 2016
With the amulet seemingly out of reach, Brian finds another way home when a fire sprite grants him a wish. But now Brian has met Effandra, a woman who actually thinks he is cool and interesting. Should he return home or stay in Munty?

=== Series 2 (2017) ===
On 12 April 2017, it was announced that Zapped had been renewed for a second series of six episodes, to be broadcast starting 12 October 2017.

No.	Title	Original release date
1	"The Trial"	12 October 2017
Brian has been locked up and charged with starting the Snail Wars. Steg persuades him to opt for trial by combat against a terrifying warrior called Radnok.
2	"Magic Darts"	19 October 2017
Brian takes a magical crash course from Howell, Barbara loses her only soothsaying client and the fairies become obsessed with darts.
3	"The Party"	26 October 2017
Brian heads to a trendy, exclusive new bar near Munty docks. He proves a hit with the bar's cool clientele, but are they what they seem? Barbara bumps into an old school-friend who offers her a rare magic object.
4	"Pear Fair"	2 November 2017
It is Munty's famous Pear Fair and Brian and Steg get the easy job of guarding an albino pear tree. Barbara must take advantage of an opportunity to join the Seers' Guild. Howell must fix a card game.
5	"Showtime"	9 November 2017
Desperate to reach the City of a Thousand Towers before the Super Solstice, Brian ingratiates himself with a company of travelling players who are in town to perform the annual Munty Play.
6	"The Henge"	16 November 2017
The Super Solstice is Brian's last chance to get home. He needs to break into the Protector's Henge while Howell performs the incantation to cross worlds, but has to first keep Howell alive and sober.

=== Series 3 (2018) ===
No.	Title	Original release date
1	"Circus"	17 October 2018
Brian is forced to perform in a travelling circus, run by the sadistic Feffenhoffer. Barbara and Steg set out to rescue him while Herman accidentally traps a fairy. Stuck on Earth, Howell tries desperately to get back to Munty.
2	"Chef"	24 October 2018
Weaver gets a job in the pub kitchen, but it is not what he'd hoped; Barbara judges the contentious annual pet show.
3	"Popcorn"	31 October 2018
Brian introduces popcorn to Munty. Barbara dreams of becoming one of the famous Munty Clack Dancers.
4	"Barrel"	7 November 2018
When Brian collects the wrong barrel from the docks, a hostage situation develops in The Jug and the Other Jug.
5	"Book"	14 November 2018
Brian has the amulet that can get him home, but it does not work.
6	"Amulet"	21 November 2018
Brian joins the Munty Reserve forces for some easy money.
