= Brett Goldstein =

English actor and writer (born 1980)

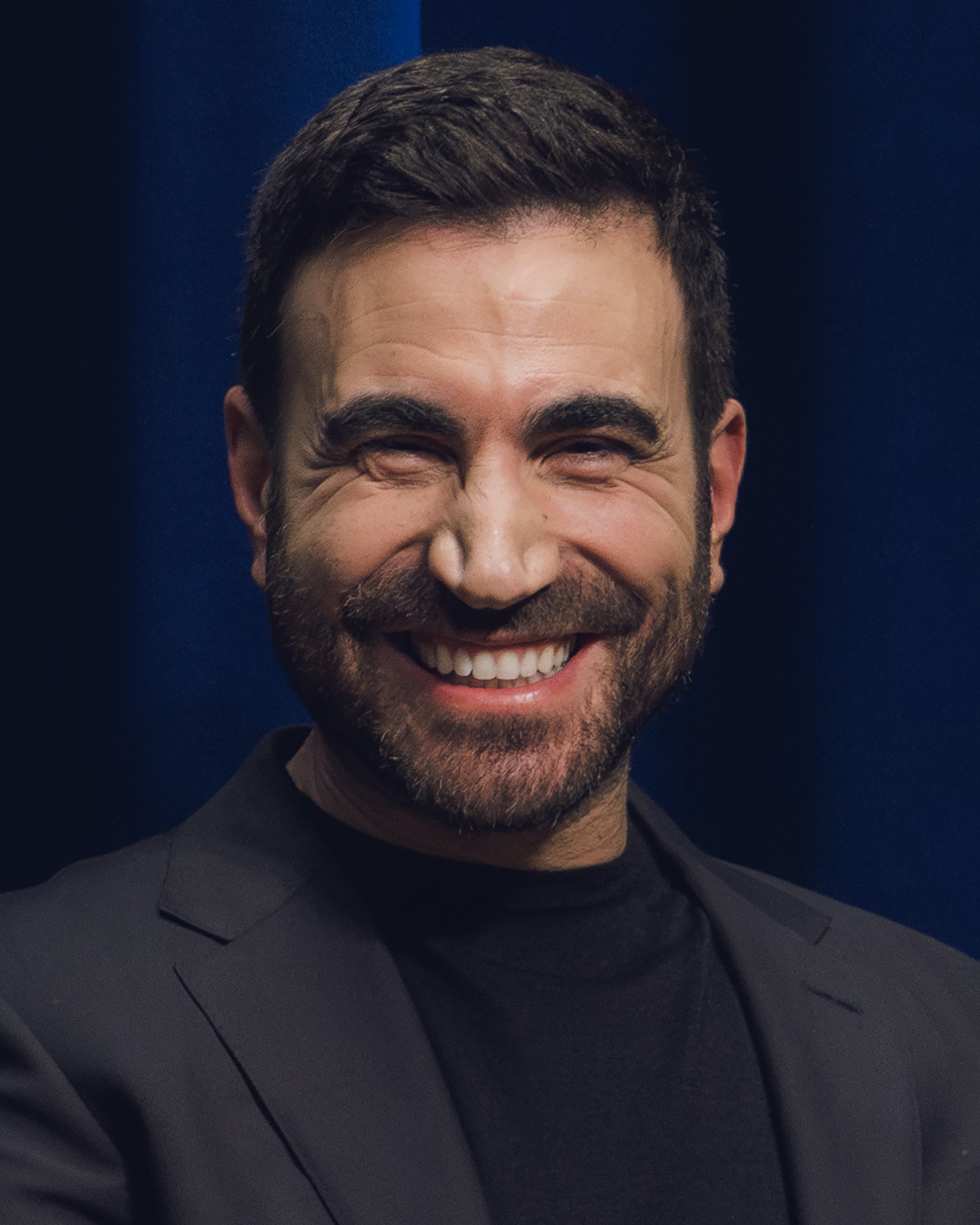
- Goldstein in 2024
- Born: 17 July 1980 (age 46); London, England
- Education: University of Warwick
- Occupations: Actor; comedian; podcaster; producer; writer
- Years active: 2005–present
- Known for: Roy Kent in Ted Lasso

Brett Goldstein (born 17 July 1980) is an English actor, comedian, podcaster, producer, and writer. Known for his role as Roy Kent in the Apple TV+ sports comedy-drama series Ted Lasso (2020–present), he received the Primetime Emmy Award for Outstanding Supporting Actor in a Comedy Series for each of the first two seasons. He is also the co-creator of the comedy-drama series Shrinking (2023–present).

== Early life and education ==
Goldstein was born in 1980 in the London suburb of Sutton, to a British Jewish family.

He was educated at Sevenoaks School. After secondary school he attended the University of Warwick, where he graduated with a degree in film studies.

Soon afterwards, he briefly relocated to Marbella, Spain, to work at a strip club which his father purchased during a "midlife crisis". He then moved to New York City to study acting at the American Academy of Dramatic Arts, until 2003. While there, he began writing scripts that he later took to the Edinburgh Fringe Festival. He turned his Marbella experience into a stand-up comedy routine, Brett Goldstein Grew Up in a Strip Club (2011).

== Career ==
Goldstein began acting in short films and had his first feature film role in the self-written thriller Wish You Were Here (2005), which was remade as Slave (2009). In 2009, he made his television debut in two episodes of ITV's long-running police drama The Bill. From 2012 to 2016, he appeared in several comedy series, such as BBC One's Uncle, E4's Drifters and Channel 4's Derek. He also played American TV legend David Hasselhoff's personal trainer, Danny, in Dave's mockumentary series Hoff the Record (2015–2016).

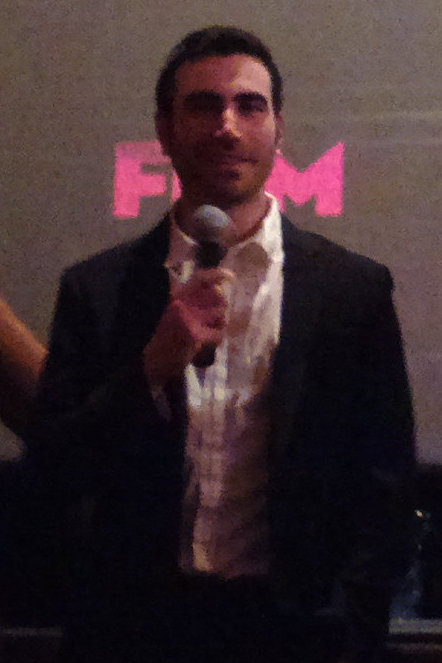
Goldstein at a screening of SuperBob in 2015

In 2013, Goldstein wrote and played the leading role of a Peckham postman-turned-superhero in the low-budget romantic comedy SuperBob (2015). At the end of filming, comedian Catherine Tate, who starred in the film as his character's boss at the Ministry of Defence, invited him to co-write and guest star in the BBC One sitcom Catherine Tate's Nan (2014–2015), a spin-off of The Catherine Tate Show about her popular sweary old-lady character Joanie Taylor. The two continued to collaborate, with Goldstein joining Tate on her first ever live tour in 2016 and co-writing the feature film The Nan Movie (2022) and a 2021 Comic Relief sketch starring Daniel Craig as James Bond.

In 2016, he won the BIFA for Best Supporting Actor for his role as Brendan in the comedy film Adult Life Skills, starring Jodie Whittaker as the lead character. In 2018, Goldstein and Whittaker appeared together in the Doctor Who episode "The Tsuranga Conundrum". Later that year, in July 2018, he began his career as a podcaster with Films to Be Buried With, a comedy podcast featuring guests talking about films that have been important in their lives. Goldstein has also written and performed four solo stand-up shows.

TV producer Bill Lawrence hired Goldstein as a writer for the 2020 Apple TV+ show Ted Lasso, starring Jason Sudeikis. His writing on the show led to his being cast as the character of ageing footballer Roy Kent. Rolling Stone's Emily Zemler stated that Goldstein "felt such a kinship with this stoic tough guy, in fact, that he emailed a self-taped audition of five scenes to the production team. The tapes, which included the 'If I don't hear silence I'm gonna start punching dicks' scene from the pilot, ended up scoring him the role. The rest is history." In the email that Goldstein sent, he told the team "If this is awkward, or this is shit, pretend you never got this email, and I promise I will never ask you about it." He won the Primetime Emmy Award for Outstanding Supporting Actor in a Comedy Series two consecutive years (2021 and 2022), for his work on the show.

Together with Black Mirror writer Will Bridges, Goldstein created and wrote the six-part science fiction anthology series Soulmates for AMC, based on their short film For Life (2013). The series premiered in October 2020 and starred Sarah Snook, Malin Akerman, Betsy Brandt, and Charlie Heaton. In 2022, he signed a multi-year overall deal with Warner Bros. Television. Later that year, Goldstein appeared as Hercules in the mid-credits scene of Thor: Love and Thunder.

== Acting and writing credits ==
=== Film ===
Year	Film	Role	Notes
2005	The Rope	Man	Short film
2005	Wish You Were Here	Young Robert Dunsmore	Also writer
2009	Slave	Young Robert Dunsmore	Also writer
2009	SuperBob	Bob	Short film
2012	The Comedian	Comedy MC	
2012	The Knot	Albert	
2013	Everyone's Going to Die	Richard	Voice
2013	Tattooed	Dave	Short film
2013	For Life	Simon	Short film; also writer
2014	The Hooligan Factory	Mr. Burrows	
2015	Legacy	Mr. Harrowgate	
2015	Howl	David	
2015	SuperBob	Bob	Also writer
2016	Adult Life Skills	Brendan	
2016	Bullet to the Heart	Steve	Short film; also co-writer
2018	Spectre of Shame	James Bond	Short film; also writer and producer
2018	F*ck	Adam	Short film
2018	Wild Honey Pie!	Matt	
2022	The Nan Movie	None	Co-writer
2022	Thor: Love and Thunder	Hercules	Cameo; mid-credits scene
2024	The Garfield Movie	Roland	Voice
2024	All of You	Simon	Also co-writer and producer
2026	At the Sea	Keegan	
2026	The Sheep Detectives	Reggie / Ronnie	Voice
2026	Office Romance	Daniel Blanchflower	Also writer and producer
2027	Not Alone	Officer Zandro	Voice; in production

=== Television ===
Year	Title	Role	Notes
2009	The Bill	Jared Miles	2 episodes
2011	White Van Man	None	Episode: "Ollie's First Day"; writer of additional material
2012–2014	Derek	Tom	11 episodes
2012	Ronna & Beverly	None	6 episodes; writer of additional material
2012	4Funnies	None	Episode: "Gittins"; writer
2013–2016	Drifters	Scott	7 episodes; also writer of additional material
2013	Common Ground	Lawrence	Episode: "Fergus & Crispin"
2013	Love Matters	Jason	Episode: "30 & Counting"
2013	Claudia O'Doherty: Comedy Blaps	Simon	Episode: "What Is Time?"
2013	Live at the Electric	IT Technician	Episode #2.2
2014–2017	Uncle	Casper	9 episodes
2014	Playhouse Presents	Photojournalist	Episode: "The Dog Thrower"
2014	Cuckoo	Policeman	Episode: "Tribunal"
2015–2016	Hoff the Record	Danny Jones	Main cast; also writer of additional material
2014–2015	Catherine Tate's Nan	Jonathan	Episode: "Nanger Management"; also co-writer of three episodes
2015	Undercover	Christophe	4 episodes
2016–2017	Drunk History	Robert Dudley, James Garfield	2 episodes
2017	The Pact	Andy	Television film
2018	Doctor Who	Astos	Episode: "The Tsuranga Conundrum"
2019	This Way Up	None	6 episodes; script editor
2020–present	Ted Lasso	Roy Kent	Main cast; also writer and executive producer
2020	Soulmates	None	Co-creator, writer and executive producer
2021	Robot Chicken	Tony Stark	Voice; episode: "May Cause Light Cannibalism"
2022	A Beginner's Guide to Grief	Grief Expert	Voice
2023–2026	Shrinking	Louis	Also co-creator, writer and executive producer
2023	Harley Quinn	Himself	Voice; episode: "A Very Problematic Valentine's Day Special"
2024	Fraggle Rock: Back to the Rock	Pryce Fraggle	Voice; 2 episodes
2025	Brett Goldstein: The Second Best Night of Your Life	Himself	Stand-up special
2025	Love, Death & Robots	Toilet	Voice; episode: "Smart Appliances, Stupid Owners"

=== Theatre ===
Year	Title	Role	Venue
2016	The Catherine Tate Show Live	Various	UK tour

=== Radio and podcast ===
Year	Title	Role	Notes	Ref.
2018	Proposal	Actor	BBC Radio 2 pilot	
2018–present	Films to Be Buried With with Brett Goldstein	Himself (host)	Podcast; 300 episodes	
2019	Obsessed With… Line of Duty	Himself (co-host)	BBC Sounds podcast; 7 episodes with Lolly Adefope	

== Awards and nominations ==
Year	Award	Category	Work	Result	Ref.
2015	FilmQuest Awards	Best Actor	SuperBob	Won	
2015	FilmQuest Awards	Best Screenplay (shared with Will Bridges and Jon Drever)	SuperBob	Won	
2016	British Independent Film Awards	Best Supporting Actor	Adult Life Skills	Won	
2021	Gold Derby Awards	Comedy Supporting Actor	Ted Lasso	Nominated	
2021	Hollywood Critics Association TV Awards	Best Supporting Actor in a Streaming Series, Comedy	Ted Lasso	Won	
2021	International Online Cinema Awards	Best Supporting Actor in a Comedy Series	Ted Lasso	Won	
2021	Screen Actors Guild Awards	Outstanding Performance by an Ensemble in a Comedy Series (shared with cast)	Ted Lasso	Nominated	
2021	Primetime Emmy Awards	Outstanding Supporting Actor in a Comedy Series	Ted Lasso	Won	
2021	Writers Guild of America Awards	Television: Comedy Series (shared with other writers)	Ted Lasso	Won	
2021	Writers Guild of America Awards	Television: New Series (shared with other writers)	Ted Lasso	Won	
2022	Critics' Choice Television Awards	Best Supporting Actor in a Comedy Series	Ted Lasso	Won	
2022	Golden Globe Awards	Best Supporting Actor – Series, Miniseries or Television Film	Ted Lasso	Nominated	
2022	Screen Actors Guild Awards	Outstanding Performance by a Male Actor in a Comedy Series	Ted Lasso	Nominated	
2022	Screen Actors Guild Awards	Outstanding Performance by an Ensemble in a Comedy Series (shared with cast)	Ted Lasso	Won	
2022	Primetime Emmy Awards	Outstanding Supporting Actor in a Comedy Series	Ted Lasso	Won	
2022	National Film Awards	Best Screenplay (shared with Catherine Tate)	The Nan Movie	Nominated	
2023	Primetime Emmy Awards	Outstanding Comedy Series (Co-Executive Producer)	Ted Lasso	Nominated	
2023	Primetime Emmy Awards	Outstanding Supporting Actor in a Comedy Series	Ted Lasso	Nominated	
2024	Screen Actors Guild Awards	Outstanding Performance by a Male Actor in a Comedy Series	Ted Lasso	Nominated	
2024	Screen Actors Guild Awards	Outstanding Performance by an Ensemble in a Comedy Series (shared with cast)	Ted Lasso	Nominated	
2025	Primetime Emmy Awards	Outstanding Comedy Series (Executive Producer)	Shrinking	Nominated	
2026	Primetime Emmy Awards	Outstanding Comedy Series (Executive Producer)	Shrinking	Pending	
2026	Primetime Emmy Awards	Outstanding Guest Actor in a Comedy Series	Shrinking	Nominated	
2026	Primetime Emmy Awards	Outstanding Short Form Nonfiction or Reality Series (Executive Producer)	Shrinking - In It Together	Nominated	
