= Georgina Rich =

British actress (born 1976)

- Born: August 1976 (age 50)
- Education: Royal Academy of Dramatic Art
- Occupation: Actress
- Years active: 2005–present
- Partner: Aschlin Ditta
- Children: 2

Georgina Rich (born August 1976) is a British actress.

== Education ==
Pursuing her love of dance, she left school in Dartford, Kent at 16 to attend the London Studio Centre in King's Cross. After three years of trying to make it as a professional dancer, she decided to combine it with acting and applied to the Royal Academy of Dramatic Art at the age of 24, graduating in 2004.

== Career ==
After her first West End role as Martin Jarvis and Diana Rigg's daughter in Honour (2006) at the Wyndham's Theatre, she was cast as Baby Houseman in the West End production of the musical Dirty Dancing (2006). Her other stage work includes The Merchant of Venice (2008), As You Like It (2011) and Richard III (2017).

Her television credits include the BBC One dramas Cuffs (2015) and River (2015), and the Black Mirror episode "Hated in the Nation" (2016). She has also played Charlie Spring's (Joe Locke) mother, Jane, in the Netflix coming-of-age series Heartstopper (2022–2026) and Wallis Simpson in the Channel 5 drama-documentary, Wallis: The Queen That Never Was (2017).

== Personal life ==
She lives in North London with her partner, writer Aschlin Ditta, and their daughters Nancy and Frankie.

== Filmography ==
=== Film ===
Year	Title	Role	Notes
2011	Dimensions	Alice	
2016	The Baby Shower	May	Short film
2019	Radioactive	Marie Curie's Mother	
2020	Blithe Spirit	Hedda Hopper	
2023	Soundproof	Jo	
2026	Heartstopper Forever	Jane Spring	Television film

=== Television ===
Year	Title	Role	Notes
2005	Kenneth Tynan: In Praise of Hardcore	Vrina	TV film
2005	The Bill	Katherine Lambert	1 episode
2005	Peter Warlock: Some Little Joy	Winifred Baker	TV film
2010	Spooks	Dana Morrison	1 episode
2011	Law & Order: UK	Lindsay Callaghan	Episode: "Denial"
2011	Waking the Dead	Teresa Harding	2 episodes
2011	Spooks	Natalie Grier	1 episode
2012	Public Enemies	Kelly	3 episodes
2013	New Tricks	Lizzie Bunce	1 episode
2014	Sherlock	Charlotte	Episode: "The Sign of Three"
2014	The Game	Alice	1 episode
2014	Ripper Street	Olivia Wakefield	1 episode
2015	In and Out of the Kitchen	Helen	Episode: "The Lodger"
2015	River	Rosa Fallows	5 episodes
2015	Cuffs	Sandy Hawkins	4 episodes
2016	Black Mirror	Tess Wallender	Episode: "Hated in the Nation"
2017	Doctors	Janet Wilkins	1 episode
2017	Holby City	Lisa Eldridge	Episode: "The Heart is a Small Thing"
2017	Rellik	Beth Mills	1 episode
2017	Wallis: The Queen That Never Was	Wallis Simpson	Docudrama
2018	Call the Midwife	Maureen Walker	1 episode
2019–2022	War of the Worlds	Rachel	4 episodes
2021	Midsomer Murders	Alicia Matheson	Episode: "Happy Families"
2022–2024	Heartstopper	Jane Spring	5 episodes
2024	Criminal Record	ACC Claudia Mayhew	5 episodes
2024	Industry	Wilhelmina Fassbinder	2 episodes
