= Niky Wardley =

English actress (born 1973)

- Born: Nicola Petra Wardley; 11 August 1973 (age 53); Luton, Bedfordshire, England
- Occupations: Actress; screenwriter
- Years active: 2000–present
- Notable work: The Catherine Tate Show (2004–2007); The Eighth Doctor Adventures (2010–2011); In with the Flynns (2011–2012)
- Spouse: Daniel Hawksford (m. 2018)
- Children: 2

Nichola Petra "Niky" Wardley (born 11 August 1973) is an English stage and screen actress. Her most notable role is schoolgirl Lauren Cooper's sidekick in the BBC's Emmy and BAFTA-nominated sketch series The Catherine Tate Show (2004–2007). She also appeared alongside Catherine Tate in the Netflix mockumentary sitcom Hard Cell (2022) and played the lead role in the BBC One sitcom In with the Flynns (2011–2012). As a voice actress, she is best known for her role as the Eighth Doctor's companion Tamsin Drew in audio dramas based on the BBC's long-running science fiction series Doctor Who.

== Early life and education ==
Wardley was born on 11 August 1973 in Luton, Bedfordshire. She started out in acting when she was in high school. Her drama teacher cast her as Nancy in Oliver! when she was about 13 years old. Reminiscing on her first ever role, Wardley said: "I knew from the very first moment that I stepped out on stage that this was what I wanted to do with my life."

She studied acting at the London Academy of Music and Dramatic Art.

== Career ==
=== Work with Catherine Tate ===
"It's amazing working with her on the show, she is probably the most talented person I have ever worked with. Her ability to change character and fully embody all the different people she plays is truly incredible. I've learnt so much from her and absolutely love working on the programme."

— Wardley on working with Catherine Tate, January 2006

While doing her first theatre production for the Royal Shakespeare Company, A Servant to Two Masters (2000–2001), she met comedian Catherine Tate and shared a dressing room with her for ten months. In 2004, Tate invited Wardley to her BBC Two sketch series, The Catherine Tate Show (2004–2007). Her most notable role in the show was schoolgirl Lauren Cooper's sidekick, Liese Jackson. In November 2005, she performed for Queen Elizabeth II and Prince Philip at the Royal Variety Performance, appearing again in the guise of Liese. During the sketch, Wardley's character remarked: "That old man sitting next to her has fallen asleep." Prince Philip then reportedly complained to the show's executive producer, saying he had been insulted.

The Catherine Tate Show lasted for three series and received critical acclaim and multiple nominations from BAFTA, the National Television Awards and the British Comedy Awards. After the show ended, Wardley and Tate continued to work together on other projects, including the show's spin-off series, Catherine Tate's Nan (2014–2015), and its UK, Australian and New Zealand live tours. She also appeared alongside Tate in the autobiographical short film My First Nativity (2010), the Netflix mockumentary series Hard Cell (2022), which she also co-wrote, the BBC sitcom Queen of Oz (2023), and the feature films Nativity 3: Dude, Where's My Donkey?! (2014) and The Nan Movie (2022).

=== Doctor Who ===
In 2010, she portrayed a companion of the Eighth Doctor (Paul McGann), failing actress Tamsin Drew, in the audio series The Eighth Doctor Adventures, produced by Big Finish Productions and based on the BBC's long-running science fiction series Doctor Who. She felt "really excited" about becoming a Doctor Who companion, having previously watched the show as a kid and being good friends with fellow companion actress Catherine Tate. Wardley was cast after being recommended to the producers by the Fifth Doctor actor, Peter Davison, with whom she had previously worked in the ITV drama series The Complete Guide to Parenting (2006). After a period of travelling with the Doctor, Wardley's character became disillusioned with him after he showed coldness in the face of others' deaths whilst favouring the lives of his friends. The Meddling Monk soon convinced her that the Doctor was a destructive force in the universe and took her under his wing. Drew travelled with the Monk for a while, but later came to regret her decision, as he told her countless lies and had sided with Earth's invaders, the Daleks. She helped the Doctor try to stop the Daleks but was eventually killed by them in the story "To the Death" (2011).

In November 2013, the Eighth Doctor mentioned Tamsin Drew among his past companions in the BBC iPlayer mini-episode "The Night of the Doctor", making her part of the official television canon. In the same month, Wardley appeared as writer Steven Moffat's receptionist in the one-off comedy homage to Doctor Who, The Five(ish) Doctors Reboot. Since 2016, she has continued to work with Big Finish and has played several other characters in Doctor Who-related audio adventures, most notably Donna Noble's (Catherine Tate's character) school friend Natalie Morrison in the four-part audio series Donna Noble: Kidnapped! (2020).

=== Other work ===
In 2006, Wardley played Joe Macer's daughter Megan in two episodes of the BBC One long-running soap opera EastEnders. She also played the lead role in the BBC One sitcom In with The Flynns (2011–2012), followed by appearances in nine episodes of Coronation Street (2012). She was then cast as Miss Brahms in the one-off revival episode of Are You Being Served? (2016). Her other television appearances include Benidorm (2007–2008), Silent Witness, My Family (both 2007), Peep Show (2008), How Not to Live Your Life (2008), Shameless (2010), The Spa, Love and Marriage (both 2013), Asylum (2015), Home from Home (2018) and Call the Midwife (2019).

From 2000 to 2022, she starred in 13 theatrical productions. Her stage work includes Alan Ayckbourn's plays Bedroom Farce (2009) and A Small Family Business (2014), as well as William Shakespeare's Much Ado About Nothing (2007–2008), starring Zoë Wanamaker and Simon Russell Beale as Beatrice and Benedick, and Twelfth Night (2017), starring Tamsin Greig as Malvolia. Both A Small Family Business and Twelfth Night were professionally recorded and broadcast through National Theatre Live.

As a voice actress, she has provided the voice of Tamara the Poodle in most episodes of the CBBC animated children's series The Pinky and Perky Show (2008–2009).

== Personal life ==
Born in Luton, Wardley now lives in Camberwell, London, and has two children. In May 2018, she married Welsh actor Daniel Hawksford, with whom she had previously worked in the National Theatre production of Shakespeare's Much Ado About Nothing (2007–2008). In 2022, they both appeared in the Netflix mockumentary sitcom Hard Cell.

== Filmography ==
=== Film ===
Year	Title	Role	Notes
2001	The Affair of the Necklace	Madame de Neiss	
2002	Out Done	Sammy	Short film
2004	Almost	Catherine	Short film
2006	Really	Kelly	
2008	Searching	Natalie	Film adaptation of the 2003 play Hello You, which also starred Wardley
2009	Condimentia	Frank's Mum	Short film
2014	Nativity 3: Dude, Where's My Donkey?!	Bridesmaid Bella	
2018	This Weekend Will Change Your Life	Pam	Also known as Killer Retreat (U.S.)
2018	Stuffed	Ellen	Short film
2020	The Gays Days	Suzanne Ewen	Short film
2022	The Nan Movie	Officer Mahler	
TBA	Go Away!	TBA	Post-production

=== Television ===
Year	Title	Role	Notes
2002	Casualty	Louisa	Series 16; episode 23: "Acceptance"
2004–2006	The Catherine Tate Show	Various characters	Series 1–3; 18 episodes. Also co-writer
2005	Holby City	Julia 'Jools' Mallinson	Series 7; episode 21: "Awakenings"
2005	Rosemary & Thyme	Daisy Mellor	Series 3; episode 1: "The Cup of Silence"
2006	EastEnders	Megan Macer	2 episodes
2006	The Complete Guide to Parenting	Karen	Episodes 1–5
2006	The Family Man	NICU Nurse (Emma Butcher)	Episodes 1–3
2007	Holby City	Sandie Booth	Series 9; episode 25: "Is There Something I Should Know?"
2007	Silent Witness	DC Kate Dickerson	Series 11; episodes 5, 7 & 8
2007	Funny Cuts	Various	Episode: "Chikipedia"
2007	My Family	Crystal	Series 8; episode: "Ho Ho No" (Christmas special)
2007–2008	Benidorm	Kelly	Series 1; episode 3, and series 2; episodes 5 & 6
2008	The Bill	Mary Haworth	Series 24; episode 4: "To Catch a Killer: Part 2"
2008	Love Soup	Kendra	Series 2; episode 8: "Lobotomy Bay"
2008	Peep Show	Cally	Series 5; episode 5: "Jeremy's Manager"
2008	How Not to Live Your Life	Maggie	Series 1; episode 1: "Home Sweet Home"
2008	Zip and Hollow	Susie	Television film
2008	Here Comes the Queen	(unknown role)	Unbroadcast pilot
2008–2009	The Pinky and Perky Show	Tamara (voice)	42 episodes
2008–2009	Parents of the Band	Sandy Soutakis	Episodes 1–6
2009	All the Small Things	Louise 'Lulu' Pryke	Episodes 1–6
2009	Nan's Christmas Carol	Various characters	Television special (a spin-off of The Catherine Tate Show)
2010	Shameless	Hazel	Series 7; episode 9: "The Wild Tales"
2010	Life of Riley	Suzy	Series 2; episode 4: "Is She Really Going Out with Him?"
2010	Little Crackers	Angie	Series 1; episode 3: "Catherine Tate's Little Cracker: My First Nativity"
2011–2012	In with the Flynns	Caroline Flynn	Series 1 & 2; 12 episodes
2012	Coronation Street	Jenny Sumner	9 episodes
2013	The Spa	Sally	Episodes 1–8
2013	Love and Marriage	Heather McCallister	Episodes 1–6
2013	The Five(ish) Doctors Reboot	Receptionist	Television film (shown on the BBC Red Button service)
2014–2015	Catherine Tate's Nan	Miss Donelly / Samantha / Lorna	3 television specials
2015	Asylum	Lorna	Mini-series; episodes 1–3
2016	Are You Being Served?	Miss Brahms	A one-off revival episode of the original series
2016	Citizen Khan	Suzanne	Series 5; episode 4: "Scab's Parents"
2018	Still Open All Hours	Mrs. Jackson	Series 4; episode 6
2018	Settling	Angela	Mini-series; episodes 1–6
2018	Home from Home	Fiona Hackett	Episodes 2–7
2019	Casualty	Kate Herbert	Series 33; episode 20
2019	Call the Midwife	Enid Wilson	Series 8; episode 4
2022	Hard Cell	Anastasia	Episodes 1–6. Also co-writer
2023	Queen of Oz	Anabel	Episodes 1–6
2024–2025	Boarders	Carol Watlington-Geese	Series 1 & 2; 11 episodes

=== Audio ===
Year	Title	Role	Production	Notes
2010–2011	Doctor Who: The Eighth Doctor Adventures	Tamsin Drew	Big Finish Productions	Series 4; 7 episodes
2016	Doctor Who: The Tenth Doctor Adventures	Rebecca 'Bex' Young	Big Finish Productions	Series 1; episode 1: "Technophobia"
2016	The Avengers: The Lost Episodes	Liz Wells	Big Finish Productions	Episode: "Death on the Slipway"
2016	Jago & Litefoot	Hannah Bennet	Big Finish Productions	Series 12; episode 3: "School of Blood"
2018	Animal Instinct: Human Zoo	Maggie	Audible	
2018	Torchwood One	Stacey	Big Finish Productions	Series 2; episode 3: "9 to 5"
2020	Dracula's Guests	Madeline	Big Finish Productions	Part of the Big Finish Classics range
2020	Donna Noble: Kidnapped!	Natalie Morrison	Big Finish Productions	Episodes 1–4
2020	High Strangeness	Mrs. Hippisley	Audible	6 episodes

=== Theatre ===
Year	Title	Role	Venue / Company	Ref.
2000–2001	A Servant to Two Masters	Clarice	Royal Shakespeare Company	
2002	The Three Sisters	Natasha	Nuffield Theatre	
2002	Our Country's Good	Mary Brenham	Nuffield Theatre	
2003	Making Waves	Helen	Stephen Joseph Theatre	
2003	Hello You	Various	Fecund Theatre	
2007–2008	Much Ado About Nothing	Margaret	National Theatre	
2009	Bedroom Farce	Jan	West Yorkshire Playhouse	
2013	The Same Deep Water as Me	Jen Needleman	Donmar Warehouse	
2014	A Small Family Business	Anita McCracken	National Theatre	
2016–2019	The Catherine Tate Show Live	Various	Various venues across the UK, Australia and New Zealand	
2017	Twelfth Night	Maria	National Theatre	
2018	Mayfly	Cat	Orange Tree Theatre	
2022	Jerusalem	Linda Fawcett	Apollo Theatre	
