= Daniel Hawksford =

Welsh actor

- Born: 10 April 1980 (age 46); Newport, Wales
- Occupation: Actor
- Spouse: Niky Wardley (m. 2018)
- Awards: Nominee for the Ian Charleson Award 2008

Daniel Hawksford (born 10 April 1980) is a Welsh stage and screen actor.

== Stage career ==
Before starting his professional career, Hawksford trained at the Royal Academy of Dramatic Art (RADA). He is an associate artist for Clwyd Theatr Cymru.

Hawksford's work in theatre includes: Much Ado About Nothing and The Hour We Knew Nothing Of Each Other at the National Theatre; The School of Night, The Tamer Tamed, The Taming of the Shrew and Cymbeline for the RSC; Jackets at the Young Vic, London; Troilus and Cressida, Romeo and Juliet and Rosencrantz and Guildenstern Are Dead at Clwyd Theatr Cymru, Wales; The Pull of Negative Gravity at the Traverse Theatre, Edinburgh and 59E59, New York; Memory at ESG, New York; Aqua NeroReview of Acqua Nero from the theatre dance and drama in Wales web site for Sgript Cymru; Romeo and Juliet at the Northcott Theatre, Exeter and Lunch at The King's Head Theatre, London. He also played Malcolm in Shakespeare's Globe's production of Macbeth.

== Personal life ==
In May 2018, he married English stage and screen actress Niky Wardley, with whom he had previously worked in the Royal National Theatre production of Shakespeare's Much Ado About Nothing (2007–2008), starring Zoë Wanamaker and Simon Russell Beale as Beatrice and Benedick. In 2022, they both appeared in the Netflix mockumentary sitcom Hard Cell (2022).

== Filmography ==
=== Film ===
Year	Title	Role	Notes
2006	Little White Lies	Dai	
2010	Pelican Blood	Mike	
2013	Another Me	PC Edwards	
2014	Night Shift	Paul	Short film
2018	A Fistful of Lead	Mr. Johnson	

=== Television ===
Year	Title	Role	Notes
2005	Colditz	MI9 Officer / Cole	2 episodes
2011	Waking the Dead	DI Paul Grigson	1 episode
2014–2017	Doctors	Andy Kay / Peter Saunders	2 episodes
2017	Hetty Feather	Somerston porter	1 episode
2018	Father Brown	Seth Knight	1 episode
2018	Hollyoaks	Doctor Tate	1 episode
2022	Hard Cell	Ioan	2 episodes

=== Video games ===
- The Witcher 2: Assassins of Kings (2011)
- The Adventures of Tintin: The Secret of the Unicorn (2011)
- Assassin's Creed IV: Black Flag (2013)

== Theatre ==
Year	Title	Role	Writer	Director	Venue
2026	Game of Thrones: The Mad King	Ser Barristan Selmy	Duncan Macmillian	Dominic Cooke	Royal Shakespeare Theatre, Stratford-Upon-Avon
