= Red Nose Day 2007 =

Fundraising event organised by Comic Relief

- The Big One, onscreen logo
- Also known as: Red Nose Day 2007: The Big One
- Genre: Telethon
- Created by: Richard Curtis
- Presented by: Lenny Henry; Fearne Cotton; Paul O'Grady; Kate Thornton; Chris Evans; Davina McCall; Jonathan Ross; Graham Norton; Russell Brand; Jeremy Clarkson; James May; Richard Hammond; Simon Pegg; Nick Frost
- Theme music composer: Led Zeppelin (retroactively)
- Opening theme: Kashmir
- Country of origin: United Kingdom

Production
- Producer: Richard Curtis
- Production location: BBC Television Centre
- Camera setup: Multiple
- Running time: 570 minutes

Original release
- Network: BBC One, BBC Two
- Release: 16 March – 17 March 2007

Related
- Red Nose Day 2005: Big Hair and Beyond; Red Nose Day 2009: Funny for Money; Comic Relief Does Fame Academy; Comic Relief Does The Apprentice; Top Gear of the Pops

Red Nose Day 2007 was a fund raising event in England organized by Comic Relief, broadcast live on BBC One and BBC Two from the evening of 16 March 2007 to early the following morning. It was part of "The Big One" campaign. Presenters introduced the show in two-halves, one titled 'The funny' and the other titled 'The money'. It featured Jonathan Ross, Russell Brand, Lenny Henry, Davina McCall, Graham Norton, Chris Evans, Paul O'Grady, Fearne Cotton, Kate Thornton, Catherine Tate, Ricky Gervais, and a short starring Sir Bob Geldof, Bono, Stephen Merchant, Jamie Oliver and Andi Peters. Borat, Billy Connolly, Ant & Dec, Peter Kay, Postman Pat, Bill Oddie and Basil Brush.

== Presenters ==
Time	Presenters
19.00-20.00	Lenny Henry; Fearne Cotton
20.00-21.00	Kate Thornton; Paul O'Grady
21.00-22.00	Chris Evans; Davina McCall
22.00-22.30	Jeremy Clarkson; Richard Hammond; James May
22.30-00.00	Jonathan Ross; Fearne Cotton
00.00-01.35	Graham Norton; Davina McCall
01.35-03.05	Russell Brand
03.05-04.30	Simon Pegg; Nick Frost

== Donation progress ==
=== 16 March 2007 ===
- 7:25 pm - £2,256,037
- 8:19 pm - £7,430,542 (£2,000,136 raised by TK Maxx selling Red Nose Day T-shirts in store)
- 9:09 pm - £15,139,826 (£1,001,219 raised by Walkers WalkEars)
- 9:48 pm - £22,148,068 (£7,008,242 raised by Sainsbury's)
- 9:54 pm - £26,820,554
- 11:30 pm - £27,420,554 (£600,000 raised by BBC Radio 1)
- 11:31 pm - £27,771,803 (£351,249 raised by Müller)
- 11:52 pm - £34,269,843

=== 17 March 2007 ===
- 12:39 am - £34,346,177 (£76,334 from Andrex)
- 1:35 am - £38,157,240
- 3:03 am - £40,236,142

== Appeals ==
Title	Appeal by	Location	Problem	Solution
'Nothing can Prepare You'	Ant & Dec	Kenya	Poor hygiene and waste disposal	£90 builds a toilet cubicle that reduces the spread of disease.
'Net Danger'	Ewan McGregor	UK	Internet child grooming	£20 can keep a child safe.
'14 in One Room'	Ant & Dec	Kenya	Malnutrition	£60 gives a Kenyan child food for a month.
'Care for the Carers'	?	UK	11-year-old girl cares full-time for both of her disabled parents	£15 can give her a day out
'Preventable and Curable'	Davina McCall	Tanzania	Malaria is killing children due to lack of medication and trained nurses	60p pays for medication to save a life.
'Safety Net'	Davina McCall	Tanzania	Disease spreading by parasites	£2.50 buys a mosquito net which can prevent fatal infections
'Families Reunited'	Fearne Cotton	UK	Teenagers who have run away from home getting into trouble	Comic Relief can keep them safe.
'A Kind of Miracle'	Billy Connolly	Somaliland	Comic Relief has helped provide medical supplies and an ambulance.	
'Why?'	Annie Lennox	Africa	Report about those who have been saved and those less fortunate.	
'Life Line'	Davina McCall	UK	Victims of Domestic violence	With money, Comic Relief can help.
'Child in Danger'	?	Tanzania	Child malnutrition	£38 can buy six months food for a child.
'Darfur'	Michael Palin	Darfur, Western Sudan	Genocide and victims of rape	£15 helps rape victims.
'Lifesaving Care'	Billy Connolly	Kibera	AIDS sufferers deny illness and treatment to save face	Money supports community hospitals who take away the social stigmata.
'Child by Child'	?	Tanzania	A child named Grey is suffering from Malaria	Comic Relief has halved the death rate of people suffering from the same condition.
'Slavery in the UK'	Emma Thompson	UK	A girl who left her own country in search of a new life, ended up a sex slave in a UK brothel	Comic Relief gave the girl a new life.

== Sketches ==
Title	-	Starring
Mr. Bean's Wedding	A brand-new Mr. Bean sketch centering on Bean sabotaging a couple's wedding.	Rowan Atkinson, Matthew Macfadyen, Michelle Ryan, Selina Cadell and David Haig
Harry Hill's TV Burp	A special version of the show.	Harry Hill, Mr. Blobby
Comic Relief Does Little Britain Live	Several extracts from the live show of Little Britain performed at the Hammersmith Apollo on 22 November 2006	Matt Lucas, David Walliams, Russell Brand, David Baddiel, Dennis Waterman, Kate Moss, Dawn French, Anthony Head, Paul Putner and Jonathan Ross
The Catherine Tate Show	Lauren Cooper has a new teacher who looks like the Doctor from Doctor Who	David Tennant
The Catherine Tate Show	Elaine Figgis dates Daniel Craig	Daniel Craig
The Catherine Tate Show	Geordie Georgie has a bone to pick with Lenny Henry	Lenny Henry
The Catherine Tate Show	Lauren Cooper is on work experience at No.10	Tony Blair
The Catherine Tate Show	Joanie "Nan" Taylor goes on Deal Or No Deal	Noel Edmonds
One Love: Ricky Gervais in Kenya	Satirical appeal video featuring Gervais and a number of celebrities.	Ricky Gervais, Stephen Merchant, Jamie Oliver, Bob Geldof, Andi Peters and Bono.
Mitchell and Webb	Numberwang	Carol Vorderman, Johnny Ball and Bill Turnbull.
Mitchell and Webb	Table of Reds, a special rendition of Lady in Red.	Chris De Burgh and Hazel Irvine
Aardman Animations	Creature Comforts Preview of new American version made for CBS	
Aardman Animations	EastEnders' Wellard the dog in claymation form	Marc Wootton (voice)
The Vicar of Dibley	A spoof of Celebrity Wife Swap	Dawn French, Sting, Trudie Styler, Emma Chambers, Gary Waldhorn, James Fleet, Roger Lloyd-Pack, Trevor Peacock, John Bluthal and Richard Armitage
Sawing A Lady in Half	A sketch featuring a magic trick.	Paul O'Grady
The Mighty Boosh	A live sketch on stage.	Julian Barratt and Noel Fielding
The Impressionists	Movie based satire	Jon Culshaw, Jan Ravens, Phil Cornwell and Ronni Ancona.
The Greatest Worst Bits of Comic Relief	Special version of Time Trumpet, exposing Comic Relief's goofs, including the truth behind the Dawn French - Hugh Grant kiss.	Armando Iannucci, Emma Thompson, Mark Watson, Joanna Neary, Richard Ayoade, David Sant, Andy Zaltzman, Adam Buxton, Matthew Holness, Paul Whitehouse, Rob Brydon and Rowan Atkinson

== Musical performances ==
=== The show ===
Artist(s)	Song	Notes
Girls Aloud vs. Sugababes	Walk This Way	This song reached number 1 in the UK Singles chart on 2007-03-18 as the official single.
Brian Potter, Andy Pipkin and The Proclaimers	I'm Gonna Be (500 Miles)	This song reached number 1 in the UK Singles chart on 2007-03-25 However, the previous week 2007-03-18 It reached number 3, based on downloads alone.
Take That	Patience	
The Killers	Read My Mind	
The Killers	When You Were Young	
Chris Moyles, Patrick Kielty and Jimmy Carr	My Way	

=== Top Gear of the Pops ===
Artist(s)	Song	Notes
Lethal Bizzle	Mr.	Deliberately cut short by Jeremy Clarkson who labelled it as 'just noise' and referred to him as "Jizzy Tissue" throughout the rest of the show.
Travis	Closer	The only song that was taken seriously.
Supergrass and Adrian Edmondson	Richard III	Jeremy Clarkson, Richard Hammond and James May 'glammed' up the song using excessive dry ice, a wind machine and 'Bonnie Tyler doves' (chickens).
McFly	Top Gear Blues (a.k.a. Sofa, Administration, Hyundai)	Written by McFly during the production of the programme using the words 'Sofa', 'Administration' and 'Hyundai' but without 'Love', 'Baby' and 'Heart'.
Justin Hawkins	Red Light Spells Danger	With James May (keyboard), Richard Hammond (bass), Jeremy Clarkson (drums)

== Features ==
=== Comic Relief Does Fame Academy ===
Live final presented by Patrick Kielty and Claudia Winkleman with judges Craig Revel Horwood, Lesley Garrett and Richard Park and featuring Tricia Penrose singing "If I Ain't Got You" and Tara Palmer-Tomkinson - "These Boots Are Made for Walkin'".

=== Comic Relief Does The Apprentice ===
Alan Sugar decides which celebrity apprentice is not raising enough money for Comic Relief and fires them.

=== Comic Relief Does Beat The Boss ===
School children design a suit for Lenny Henry to wear whilst presenting tonight's show.

=== Top Gear of the Pops ===
Jeremy Clarkson, Richard Hammond and James May present their own Top Gear take on the axed chart show Top of the Pops, featuring performances from Lethal Bizzle, McFly, Travis and Supergrass, while the boys discuss "News" on various musical topics, and perform as a band for Justin Hawkins in the closing number.

=== Pimp My Red Nose Ride ===
Tim Westwood presents a special edition of Pimp My Ride in which he visits an old people's home in Staffordshire and then pimps their dishevelled 12-year-old LDV community transport bus. The finished bus came complete with waterproof seating, a walking stick rack and an onboard bingo hall.

=== Stash of Celebrity Swag ===
Justin Lee Collins and Alan Carr raid a celebrity's mansion in an updated version of Through the Keyhole and steal some of their belongings. Viewers can call in to win the bag of swag if they can guess, from the really obvious clues, who the swag belongs too. This phone-in competition was later subject to an investigation in which it was revealed the winner was faked. After the first two genuine callers got the answer wrong the queue was lost. After a delay the third caller and subsequent winner was faked by a crew member.

In the lead up to Red Nose Day many different fund raising events occurred:

- Beginning Friday 9 March 2007, the BBC Radio 1 breakfast team staged a tour around the UK entitled The Chris Moyles Rallyoke. The tour involved seven Karaoke nights held in a well known UK location featuring members of the public and well known celebrities and music artists. Most Radio 1 shows report on their progress, and hold competitions to win tickets to be at the final on Red Nose Day, and also to win the contents of a truck donated by various celebrities. As well as raising money at each event, the profit of the phone-in competitions go to Comic Relief making a total of £600,000
- Televised events included a third series of Comic Relief Does Fame Academy, and a celebrity version of The Apprentice entitled Comic Relief Does The Apprentice has also been screened. Also a special hybrid of Top of the Pops and Top Gear titled Top Gear of the Pops was made for Red Nose Day. It featured its presenters Jeremy Clarkson, Richard Hammond and James May singing with Justin Hawkins, as well as Top Gear segments such as The Cool Wall.
- Fund raising merchandise sold during the 2007 campaign included the Big One (Red Nose) itself, 'Walkears', an Andrex Puppy with a red nose, a special Little Britain Live DVD and the official single, which was a cover of Aerosmith's 'Walk This Way' sung by Girls Aloud and Sugababes.
- The last episode of the Vicar of Dibley was aired as part of the show, starring the usual cast. It featured Sting taking part with a celebrity and non-entity television show, swapping wives with the vicar's husband Harry.
- The special Little Britain Live featured famous people such as: Dennis Waterman, Chris Moyles, Jonathan Ross, Kate Moss and Russell Brand. Kate Moss played a chav, Russell Brand played a transvestite, and both Chris Moyles and Jonathan Ross were brought on as either small parts, or people who came up to the audience to be embarrassed.
- There were several sketches from Catherine Tate: in which David Tennant (who she would work with again a year later in Doctor Who, which is referenced to & joked about within the sketch) became a school teacher; Daniel Craig fell in love with Tate; mouthy teenager Lauren was given work experience at 10 Downing Street, leading to Tony Blair using her catchphrase "Am I bovvered?"; and foul-mouthed "Nan" appeared with Noel Edmonds on Deal or No Deal.
- To gain additional money, Peter Kay and Matt Lucas released a cover of The Proclaimers hit, I'm Gonna Be, and released it as a single 'I Would Roll (500 Miles)' (both were playing characters who used wheelchairs from Little Britain and Phoenix Nights). It also featured numerous celebrity guests.
- There was also a live show from The Mighty Boosh.

== Cast & reporters ==
- Ant & Dec
- Billy Connolly
- Ewan McGregor
- Annie Lennox
- Davina McCall
- Fearne Cotton
- Emma Thompson
- Catherine Tate
- Peter Kay
- Daniel Craig
- Richard Hammond
- Jeremy Clarkson
- James May
- Justin Hawkins
- Jamie Oliver
- Bob Geldof
- Ricky Gervais
- Stephen Merchant
- Sting
- Bono
- Tony Blair
- Rowan Atkinson
- Michelle Ryan
- Sacha Baron Cohen
- Carol Vorderman
- Johnny Ball
- Noel Edmonds
- Andrew Lloyd Webber
- David Tennant
- Elle Macpherson
- Dawn French
- Dick and Dom
- Gary Barlow
- Matt Lucas
- David Walliams
- Chris Moyles
- Russell Brand
