= Lauren Cooper =

Fictional character in The Catherine Tate Show

- The Catherine Tate Show character
- Portrayed by: Catherine Tate
- Duration: 2004–2007, 2017, 2020
- First appearance: 16 February 2004
- Last appearance: 23 April 2020
- Created by: Catherine Tate
- Introduced by: Derren Litten
- Spin-off appearances: Children in Need (2005)
In-universe information
- Father: Terry Cooper
- Mother: Shelly Cooper
- Brothers: Mickey Cooper; Johnny Cooper
- Sisters: Shannon Cooper
- Grandmothers: Joan Cooper
- Aunts: Julie Johnson

Dame Lauren Alicia Mishika Tanisha Felicia Jane Cooper is a fictional character in The Catherine Tate Show. Lauren is one of the show's main characters and is portrayed by Catherine Tate. The character was "killed off" in the 2007 Christmas Special, which aired on 25 December.

Lauren is a 15-year-old schoolgirl with a surly attitude and was most widely known for her phrase "Am I bovvered?" (i.e., "bothered," pronounced with th-fronting). When feeling angry or embarrassed, she frequently replies with defensive responses such as "Am I bovvered?", "Do I look bovvered?" or "Are you disrespecting me?", among others. As demonstrated through her clothing and mannerisms, Tate portrays Lauren as a caricature of a chav.

She claimed to have been made a Dame at the end of her sketch on the Royal Variety Performance 2005.

== The Catherine Tate Show ==
In series one, sketches feature Lauren arguing with authority figures such as train conductors and teachers, as well as her best friend Liese Jackson (played by Niky Wardley) and her boyfriend Ryan Perkins (played by Mathew Horne). She normally utters her trademark catchphrases only after being provoked or embarrassed. Lauren is one of the most popular characters with fans and is arguably the most recognizable from the show. She is listed as "Fly Girl" on the series one DVD.

In series two, Lauren becomes more offensive than ever before. One notable change is that Lauren starts insulting without provocation, whereas in the past her catchphrase "Am I bovvered?" was used only after she believed she had been wronged. She is now 15 and, according to one of her teachers, is in grave danger of leaving school without any GCSEs.

In the 2005 Christmas special, her singing is revealed to be poor when she, Liese, and Ryan audition as "the Flygirl Collective and MC Perkins" for Fame Academy. In their audition, they sing their own rendition of "Shut Up" by The Black Eyed Peas, which is poorly received by Richard Park.

In series three, she spends the summer holidays working at "Billy's Burger Bar". Her attitude at school remains the same as before. She has a new rival for Ryan's affections, a girl named Kelly (played by Natalie Cassidy), and falls for a fake marriage proposal from Ryan. She is due to marry Ryan in the final episode, but he jilts her at the altar because of his embarrassment of Lauren after she sings a very squeaky, off-key version of Celine Dion's "My Heart Will Go On" to him. Lauren even insulted the reverend by using her catchphrase, as well as calling her a lesbian and being transgender, and stating that god doesn’t exist.

Despite Lauren's blatant disregard for authority and chav-like demeanor, she sometimes shows surprising intelligence. She is well-versed in the Periodic table, she apparently knows Shakespeare, as shown in the sketch in Comic Relief 2007 with David Tennant playing her Scottish literature teacher, knows how to say "Am I bovvered?" in British Sign Language, and she even speaks French, once surprising her French teacher by asking her "Regardez mon visage. Suis-je bovvered? Est-ce que vous appelez ma mère une pikey? Est-ce que vous appelez mon père un gypo?" ("Look at my face. Am I bovvered? Are you calling my mum a pikey? Are you calling my dad a gypo?"), although she refuses to speak any French for her oral exam.

== Other appearances ==
Lauren made an appearance during the BBC's Comic Relief telethon in March 2005. The sketch features fans of McFly asking the group questions. Lauren decides to ask them: "Why are you so rubbish?" When told by Simon Amstell, who is hosting the segment, that only positive questions are allowed, Lauren uses a variety of her catch phrases, including "Am I bovvered?" ("I ain't McBovvered"), and continues to question them harshly. Lauren is then "ordered" to ask a more positive question of the group, and confuses them with Busted, asking, "Are you gutted that Charlie left?" She is told to leave the set, and as she does, she asks Danny Jones from McFly to sign her knee, but walks away promptly, saying, "You can't even spell."

In November 2005, Lauren appeared in a sketch for the Children in Need telethon. The sketch is a crossover with EastEnders. The scene is set when Lauren arrives in Walford in search of revenge on Stacey Slater (Lacey Turner), who has apparently stolen her boyfriend. She looks for her in the launderette, where she finds Little Mo Mitchell (Kacey Ainsworth), who tells her that Stacey is not there. She then visits The Queen Victoria public house, and Peggy Mitchell (Barbara Windsor) finds herself getting increasingly frustrated and annoyed with Lauren, who asks, "Are you a Cockney? Are you a Cockney sparrow?" (pronounced "cockerney"). Peggy then orders Lauren out of her pub with immediate effect.

In November 2005, Lauren was a featured sketch performer at the 77th Royal Variety Performance. After Lauren embarrasses herself in front of the audience, Ryan points out that Queen Elizabeth II is laughing at her. Looking up at the Royal Box, she asks, "Are you disrespecting me?" and mimics the Queen's accent, asking, "Is one bovvered?" She receives a phone call, answers timidly, "Hello, yes, thank you," and hangs up. When asked who it was, she announced, "I've just been made a Dame."

On 16 March 2007, Tate appeared twice on Comic Relief as Lauren. Guests in the sketches included David Tennant. Tennant plays her new English teacher, Mr. Logan, who, after being goaded by Lauren for his Scottish accent and resemblance to The Doctor, is finally pushed over the edge when she asks him if he fancies Billie Piper. He threatens to fail her in the entire module, and later to call her parents, and Lauren proceeds to do her "Am I bovvered?" routine in Shakespearean style "Amest I bovvered, forsooth?" with many other famous lines changed "looketh at my face" followed by a recitation of Sonnet 130 off the top of her head ending with a definitive "Bite me alien boy". Unable to put up with Lauren's belligerence any longer, Mr. Logan then reveals he is indeed the Doctor, as he produces the sonic screwdriver from inside his jacket and turns her into a 5" Rose Tyler action figure with it, misquoting Romeo and Juliet by saying "A Rose by any other name would smell as sweet". The figure proclaims that it "still ain't bovvered". Tony Blair also makes a cameo appearance when Lauren is on work experience at Downing Street. Upon Lauren attempting to tell Blair who the most famous person she had met was, he asks her if he is "bovvered", much to the astonishment of Lauren. He then instructs her to "look at his face" and acknowledge that "no part of it is bovvered". He then orders her out of his office, prompting Lauren to shout back that the most famous person she has met is Ross Kemp.

== "Death" ==
In the 2007 Christmas special of The Catherine Tate Show, Lauren dies after falling from a waterfall while kayaking, having ignored warnings from a local man, after asking him, "Are you a yokel?" and "Is your cousin your mum? Is your dad your brother? Are you your own father?" At the end of the episode, Liese and Ryan are seen standing beside her gravestone that says:

In Loving Memory

LAUREN COOPER
1992–2007

I Still Ain't Bovvered

== Reprise ==
The character was revived in 2017 for Red Nose Day and appears on stage with Lenny Henry and Warwick Davis. She also returned in The Big Night In, a 20 April 2020 telethon held during the COVID-19 pandemic, in a skit in which she was schooled remotely by a teacher again played by David Tennant.

== Influence ==
In 2006, Lauren's catchphrase word "bovvered" was named Word of the Year. A spokesperson for the OED commented:

"Am I bovvered?" and its follow-up, "Does my face look bovvered?" had already come to be seen as the perfect expression of a generation of teenagers and their speaking style.

Alan Carr spoofed Lauren in a sketch on Catherine Tate's episode of The Friday Night Project.

In a recurring spoof on NBC's Late Night with Jimmy Fallon, Jimmy Fallon performs in character as a vampire version of Robert Pattinson, talking about things that bother him while in a tree.

A 2016 update to the Oxford English Dictionary added the word "bovver", which had been in use since 1871 and had been "made famous by comedian Catherine Tate".

== See also ==
- List of The Catherine Tate Show characters
