= Horne & Corden =

Television series

- Directed by: Kathy Burke
- Starring: Mathew Horne; James Corden; Mathew Baynton; Kellie Bright; Nick Mohammed
- Opening theme: Does It Offend You, Yeah? - "We Are Rockstars"
- Country of origin: United Kingdom
- Original language: English
- No. of series: 1
- No. of episodes: 6

Production
- Running time: 30 minutes
- Production company: Tiger Aspect Productions

Original release
- Network: BBC Three
- Release: 10 March – 14 April 2009

Related
- Gavin & Stacey

Horne & Corden is a British sketch show written by Jon Brown, Steve Dawson, Andrew Dawson, Tim Inman and the cast, script edited by Sam Ward, and starring Mathew Horne and James Corden. It aired on BBC television in 2009. The first episode was broadcast on 10 March 2009 on BBC Three. It is presented by stars Mathew Horne and James Corden in front of a live audience, featuring pre-recorded sketches (often on location) and vignettes filmed in a studio with an audience. Several episodes featured a song and dance routine as their finale. The first episode attracted the highest ratings for a comedy show debut on BBC Three, however, ratings quickly dropped throughout the show's run.

In Australia, all six episodes were also aired on ABC2 (and the ABC iView catch-up service) from 1 September to 6 October 2009 in the Thursday 9pm timeslot.

== Cast ==
- Mathew Horne - various characters
- James Corden - various characters
- Rob Brydon - sports commentator
- Nick Mohammed - ensemble
- Kellie Bright - ensemble
- Mathew Baynton - ensemble
- Helen Cripps - ensemble

== Episodes ==
No.	Title	Written by	Original release date	UK viewers (millions)
1	"Series 1, Episode 1"	Mathew Horne & James Corden	10 March 2009	0.817
We meet Xander, the old boarding school chum from hell; see Tim Goodall, the gayest news reporter ever; watch James's valiant attempts to win a world championship relay race; see the army searching for a new Nokia charger; and see Ricky Gervais has a very special turn in the latest Karate Kid film.
2	"Series 1, Episode 2"	Mathew Horne & James Corden	17 March 2009	0.681
James struggles to keep the show together when Mathew is late, Shovey Mate surprises his friend mid-urination, and Mat and James struggle in the world synchronised swimming championships. Superman and Spider-Man have another awkward meeting in the local supermarket, gay reporter Tim Goodall investigates knife crime, Apparently Man tells his work mate about the fight he 'apparently' got into last night, and we take a break for an infomercial about the dangers of aspinall.
3	"Series 1, Episode 3"	Mathew Horne & James Corden	24 March 2009	0.502
Mat and James try to do their bit to help a disabled fan... with disastrous results. Meanwhile, Superman has to give Spider-Man some very bad news about Banana Man; Ricky Gervais takes on a new western film; James has something interesting to show Mat; and the Young People's Church have a very special message for the non-believers.
4	"Series 1, Episode 4"	Mathew Horne & James Corden	31 March 2009	0.650
A bank job is interrupted when someone needs a phone charger; the Burger Boys visit the dentist with disastrous results; Xander has an unfortunate incident with a children's toy; Shovey Mate turns up in a cafe; Jonny and Lee Miller tackle Orinoco Flow; and Paul Whitehouse makes a guest appearance.
5	"Series 1, Episode 5"	Mathew Horne & James Corden	7 April 2009	0.329
The Vague Critics provide more meaningless debate; Xander interrupts Jibson's work presentation; the Silent Farter is once again not that silent; and Mat desperately tries to catch up with the mysterious Julie.
6	"Series 1, Episode 6"	Mathew Horne & James Corden	14 April 2009	0.434
Tim Goodall tackles obesity; Xander interrupts Jibson's daughter's birthday party; Shovey Mate attacks in a lift; Spider-Man and Superman finally show their true colours; and the Young People's Church have a song with a mission. Plus, a guest appearance from Will Young.

== Reception ==
Although the first episode of the show attracted 817,000 viewers, making it most-watched debut for a comedy series on BBC Three, the reviews for Horne & Corden were critical. Benji Wilson of the Daily Telegraph said that the show "was about as funny as credit default swaps". while Rachel Cooke in the New Statesman called it "excruciating – as funny and as puerile as a sixth-form revue". Sam Wollaston from The Guardian wrote:

"There's a sketch about a gay war reporter, a cock-drawing class in a boys' school, Spiderman and Superman meet in the changing rooms, a bloke takes forever to reach orgasm. Clever, see? It's crude, but that's not the problem; crude can be funny. Not here, though, because of how artlessly it's done. It looks as if they've just thought of these comedy situations, and then not really known how to fill them in. Never has a three-minute sketch felt so long, and the joke inevitably comes down to the fact that James Corden is fat and is happy to show us his wobbly bits. Or one of them gets his arse out."

Harry Venning, writer of radio sitcom Clare in the Community and head television critic for The Stage, speculated that over-exposure and hubris had led Horne and Corden to think they could just turn up and make people laugh. The duo "deserve everything they get ... They are actors, not comedians. The whole thing was terrible. Corden has a bit of comic persona, but Horne hasn't any. He was stuck in this awful straight-man role. What really annoys me is this attitude that they've had a hit sitcom – done that – so writing a sketch show should be easy. What happened to quality control? Didn't anyone think, 'We need to get in some writers'? It's a shame because I like them both. They are very good actors."

Some reviews, however, were positive. Keith Watson from Metro said that: "When it calmed down, it hit the spot: Corden does a very sharp Ricky Gervais and the pair of them combining as dancing magic act Jonny Lee Miller stretched things into the surreal. But they need to get over the need to whip each others' kits off. Come on, guys, get a room."

Tom Sutcliffe from The Independent was also more positive saying: "They're both talented comic actors (Corden, in particular, did a note-perfect piss-take of Ricky Gervais, scene-stealing shamelessly as he performed in a remake of The Karate Kid), so where there were dips, it was usually the result of material rather than delivery. And, though it would be ridiculously early to write it off, it was worrying that their opener should have been so reliant on material that struck you as a bit end-of-term-revue in character. Corden's naked body was treated as a kind of get-out-jail-free card, with no less than three sketches in which he got his kit off and at least one more in which the only gag derived from his obesity."

Overnight ratings for the second episode were down 136,000 from the first show. The third episode attracted 502,000 viewers — down 305,000 from the first episode and 179,000 from the second. The fourth episode went up in the ratings, attracting 650,000 viewers, with a 4.5% share of the audience, but the fifth saw a substantial decrease with just 392,000 viewers. The final episode drew a "disappointing" 434,000 viewers. However, despite the fall, it managed more than almost all other shows on digital channels with that slot.

In March 2010, Corden stated that the sketch show was a mistake.

== Pulled sketch ==
In the first episode of Horne & Corden, there was a sketch (developed by Horne and Corden themselves on the set of Gavin & Stacey) featuring two characters called Jonny and Lee Miller, a pair of West Country magicians whose dance routines are better than their magic. In the sketch, they try to "magic away" gun crime. However, the sketch was pulled from three repeats and was edited out of the edition on the BBC iPlayer because of the Winnenden school shooting in Germany, which occurred the day after the show was first broadcast. The BBC said in a statement: "Following the tragic events in Winnenden on Wednesday, a decision was taken to remove the final scene of episode one of Horne & Corden for all repeats, including iPlayer." However, on the 17 May repeat of the show the sketch was repeated and was on the iPlayer edit. The DVD release of the show also includes the sketch.
