= Richard Sandling =

British comedian, film reviewer, presenter, writer, director, actor and musician

- Notable work: So You Think You're Funny

Comedy career
- Years active: 2006–present
- Medium: Stand-up, television
- Genres: Cringe comedy, Observational comedy
- Subjects: Everyday life, Facts

Richard Sandling is a British comedian, film reviewer, presenter, writer, director, actor and musician from South Benfleet. He won So You Think You're Funny in 2007.

== Career ==
=== Comedy ===
Sandling started off his career in comedy by running and MCing (the now defunct) Squat Betty Alternative Comedy Club in Southend and has performed stand-up comedy at the Edinburgh Festival Fringe a number of times, both as a solo act and as part of sketch double act Kiosk of Champions with Stuart Goldsmith.

He has performed all over the UK as well as North America and Canada. In 2008 he was part of the Montreal Just For Laughs Britcom Show, and in 2012 he was the only British nominee at Comedy Central’s The Comedy Awards in New York.

Since 2009 Richard has run Perfect Movie. Perfect Movie is a stand up and sketch comedy night all about films featuring recreations of top comedians favourite movie scenes, games, trailers, sketches and more. During the 2020 lockdown he livestreamed the show every Saturday Night. When the show started in 2009 Nick Helm was a regular guest doing every show for the first three years.

=== Film ===
In 2020 Sandling made his directorial feature film debut with PHASE. Filmed remotely, in isolation entirely via Zoom, PHASE is a sci-fi comedy about a performer who spends a day on Zoom with family and friends while waiting to relaunch his musical career in lockdown - and also possibly fight off an invasion of pan-dimensional clones. The cast included Sandling himself, Phill Jupitus and Stephen Frost, amongst others.

Richard is also an award-winning short form filmmaker making mashups, video art and narrative pieces.

A enthusiast for avant garde and experimental cinema, Richard runs Squat Betty Avant Garde Film Night every month at Resistance Gallery in Bethnal Green to promote and show experimental short films from all over the world.

As an actor, Richard’s film credits include Nan The Movie, Nightshooters, A Fistful of Lead, Nina Forever, The Comedian's Guide to Survival and Ashens and The Quest For The Game Child.

He was the Myspace.com/comedy film reviewer for a time and is featured in the documentary The People vs. George Lucas.

=== Television ===
His TV work includes a season regular on Catherine Tate’s Nan Specials and Zapped, as well as appearances in Peep Show, Miranda, and Russell Howard’s Good News.

== Personal life ==
A collector of VHS tapes, Richard has performed three Edinburgh shows about his passion for VHS.
