= Aschlin Ditta =

British screenwriter (born 1968)

- Born: Aschlin Haydon Ditta; 20 June 1968 (age 57); Barnet, London, England, UK
- Education: Webber Douglas Academy of Dramatic Art
- Occupations: Screenwriter; actor
- Years active: 2004–present
- Partner: Georgina Rich
- Children: 2

Aschlin Haydon Ditta (born 20 June 1968), often credited as Ash Ditta, is a British television and film screenwriter and actor.

== Biography ==
Ditta was born on 20 June 1968 in Barnet, north London, UK, and was brought up in Leicester and then Ely in the Fens, attending King's Ely school. His father, Douglas, was an actor and his mother, Pamela, was a florist. His background is in comedy and he was a stand-up comedian and actor, having trained at the Webber Douglas Academy of Dramatic Art.

He began his television career by writing and acting in three series and two specials of BBC Two's The Catherine Tate Show, which has won many awards including three British Comedy Awards and a National Television Award and was nominated for six BAFTAs and an International Emmy. Ditta later continued collaborating with Catherine Tate on his debut feature film Scenes of a Sexual Nature (2006), the Gold television film Do Not Disturb (2016) and an episode of the BBC sitcom Queen of Oz (2023).

His television writing credits include episodes of No Angels, Totally Frank, Mr. Sloane and Doc Martin. He has also written several feature films including Scenes of a Sexual Nature (2006), Swimming with Men (2018) and French Film (2009), for which he won Best Screenplay at the 2008 Monte Carlo Film Festival.

In 2010, he co-wrote the Royal Court play The Laws of War about a rookie Human Rights Watch officer, starring Bill Nighy, James Nesbitt, David Harewood and Penelope Wilton.

== Personal life ==
He lives in South London with his partner, actress Georgina Rich, and their daughters, Nancy and Frankie.

== Writing credits ==
=== Film ===
Year	Title	Notes
2006	Scenes of a Sexual Nature	Also actor
2008	French Film	Also co-producer
2010	An Act of Love	Short film
2018	Swimming with Men	Also actor

=== Television ===
Year	Title	Notes
2004–2007	The Catherine Tate Show	Also actor
2005	No Angels	Episode #2.6
2005	Totally Frank	Episode: "Debt"
2009	Nan's Christmas Carol	TV special
2014	Mr. Sloane	Episode: "It's a Date, Mr. Sloane"
2016	Do Not Disturb	TV film; also executive producer
2019	Doc Martin	Episode: "The Shock Of The New"
2023	Queen of Oz	Episode: "They Used to Oink at Me"
2023	The Inheritance	Channel 5 series; also executive producer
