= Nan's Christmas Carol =

2009 British TV special

- Written by: Catherine Tate; Aschlin Ditta; Gordon Anderson
- Starring: Catherine Tate; Mathew Horne; Ben Miller; David Tennant; Roger Lloyd-Pack
- Country of origin: United Kingdom

Production
- Executive producer: Geoffrey Perkins
- Running time: 30 minutes, 50 minutes (Christmas special)

Original release
- Network: BBC One
- Release: 25 December 2009

Related
- The Catherine Tate Show (2004–2007)

Nan's Christmas Carol is a spin-off of The Catherine Tate Show. The one-off special, based on Charles Dickens' 1843 novella A Christmas Carol, is about Nan visited by three ghosts on Christmas night in her council flat. It is the first episode in spin-off Catherine Tate's Nan specials.

== Plot ==
=== The Beginning ===
Jamie comes to visit Nan in her council flat, only to find she's been sitting in the dark with the heating off to save money. She is visited by some carollers (played by Madness) who, she angrily orders to go away. Then, Nan’s old friend and neighbour, Nellie, who she does the lottery with, visits. This doesn't please her, but she doesn't buy the lottery and she keeps it in a jar for herself to save. Nan's nephew, "Northern Bob", his wife Julie, two children and dog, Tiny Tim, are hoping to stay for the night and have Christmas dinner with Joanie. They give her an alternative Christmas present by making a donation in her name to the Mobile Library of Sudan. Annoyed with the present, she kicks them out. This infuriates Jamie, who subsequently leaves as well.

In the night, the ghost of Jake Taylor (Dominic Coleman), her deceased husband, comes through her closet to tell her she'll be visited by three more ghosts.

=== Christmas Past ===
The first ghost she is visited by is the Ghost of Christmas Past (Ben Miller), who is really rubbish at his haunting tricks.

He takes her to her house when she was a little girl. They see her mother putting her to bed to be ready for Father Christmas. She leaves him out a mince pie and a glass of milk. In the morning, Father Christmas left the younger Joanie a tangerine. She opens her mouth and "Nan" is born. Then he takes Joanie to the 1950s when she sees her and Jake failing to arrange a date together. Then he takes her to the 1970s, where Joanie and Jake are very unhappily married.

=== Christmas Present ===
The next ghost to appear is the Ghost of Christmas Present (David Tennant). He comes on with his mobile playing the "Ghostbusters Theme", which doesn't impress Nan.

The Ghost first takes Nan to the flat of her neighbour and old friend, Gail. Gail is sitting with her and Nan’s old friends. They are watching television, hoping they will win the lottery. Unfortunately for them, they don’t. Nan makes fun of them for having hope.

He then shows “Northern Bob” and his family on the streets, waiting for a bus which won’t come. They eat crisps for Christmas Lunch, which chokes Tiny Tim to death.

=== Christmas Future ===
The last ghost to visit her is the Ghost of Christmas Future (Roger Lloyd-Pack) who appears in an advert on her TV, which again doesn't impress her.

He takes her to the following year where she sees her lottery friends realising they have won the lottery. Since Nan was in charge of buying the lottery tickets, but didn’t bother to buy them, saving the money in a jar, Nan, Nellie and their lottery friends haven’t won anything. Nan pretends to go into the corner shop to get the money, but she comes back out and gives them £1 each, claiming that there were thousands of winners but the women realise what Nan has done. The old ladies turn against Nan and chase her down the street.

Jamie has a baby son, Ludvig Brian Taylor, by his German wife Stephanie, but doesn't invite Nan to the christening as he wants her to have nothing to do with the baby.

She ends up living in a retirement home where nobody comes up to see her, and everyone in the retirement home hates her.

At her funeral, nobody turns up except Jamie, Stephanie and their son, who don't pay any attention at all. The Ghost explains to Nan that if she doesn't change her ways, the visions that he has shown Nan will come true. Nan wakes up the following morning in her flat.

=== The End ===
She tells Jamie to get to the corner shop to buy her stuff for a Christmas banquet. She invites Bob and the family (and lets them stay for the night), and her Lottery friends. The carollers come back and sing "Baggy Trousers".

When everyone is in bed, she picks up a packet of crisps and calls for Tim and offers one to him, implying she hasn't changed at all.

== Cast ==
- Catherine Tate as Joan "Joanie"/Nan Taylor
- Mathew Horne as Jamie Taylor
- Ben Miller as the Ghost of Christmas Past
- David Tennant as the Ghost of Christmas Present
- Roger Lloyd-Pack as the Ghost of Christmas Yet To Come
- Dominic Coleman as Jake Taylor
- Gabriel Maragh as baby Ludvig
- Deddie Davies as Nellie
- Madness as carolers
- Richard Lumsden as Bob Cratchit
- Rosie Cavaliero as Julie Cratchit
- Alana Knowles as Young Joanie/Young Nan
- Owen Salthouse as Ashley Cratchit
- Lorna Brown as nursing home caregiver
- Twist as Tiny Tim: The Dog

== See also ==
- The Catherine Tate Show
- A Christmas Carol
- Adaptations of A Christmas Carol
- List of Christmas films
- Joanie Taylor
