= Catherine Tate's Nan =

- Starring: Catherine Tate; Mathew Horne; Niky Wardley
- No. of episodes: 4

Release
- Original network: BBC One
- Original release: 25 December 2009 – 30 December 2015

Season chronology
- ← Previous; Series 3

Catherine Tate's Nan (simply referred to as Nan on-screen) is a BBC One spin-off series of specials which follows the character of Joanie Taylor (Catherine Tate) from the original sketch comedy series The Catherine Tate Show. When the initial series ended in 2007, a Christmas Special was broadcast in 2009, Nan's Christmas Carol, which is now established as the first episode of the Nan specials, and was followed by three subsequent specials in 2014 and 2015 under the title Nan.

== Cast ==
=== Main cast ===
- Catherine Tate as Joanie “Nan” Taylor
- Mathew Horne as Jamie Taylor
- Niky Wardley as Joanie’s Mum/Ms. Donnelly/Lorna/Samantha

=== Supporting cast ===
Episode 1

- Ben Miller as Ghost of Christmas Past
- David Tennant as Ghost of Christmas Present
- Roger Lloyd-Pack as Ghost of Christmas Future
- Madness as Themselves
- James Martin as Himself

Episode 2

- Richard Sandling as Steve
- Ami Metcalf as Alice
- Adlyn Ross as Mira
- David Webber as Geoff

Episode 3

- Richard Sandling as Steve
- Warwick Davis as Mr. Fanèe
- Colin Spaull as Bernie
- Brett Goldstein as Jonathan
- Seeta Indrani as Relationship Therapist
- Dan Starkey as Ian (Shorty)
- Amy Bowden as Emo Girl
- Naveed Khan as Rasheed the Caretaker

Episode 4

- Adam James as Charles Wilmott
- Joan Hodges as Peggy
- Michael Phong Le as Trong Tri
- Evan Davis as Himself

== Episodes ==
| No. overall | No. special | Title | Directed by | Written by | Original release date | UK viewers (millions) |
|---|---|---|---|---|---|---|
| 21 | 1 | "Nan's Christmas Carol" | Gordon Anderson | Catherine Tate, Aschlin Ditta & Gordon Anderson | 25 December 2009 | 8.46 |
In a spoof to Charles Dickens' A Christmas Carol, Nan Taylor becomes a real scrooge and loses her Christmas spirit. After turning away her family members, the Cratchits, this causes Jamie to snap and walk out. Eventually, she receives a visit from her late husband informing her that she will be visited by the ghosts of Christmas past, present and future. Note: Nan's Christmas Carol is the now established as the first episode of the 'Nan' specials, as it is not part of the original sketch series format, and features Nan as the only character from the original series, although it is the only 'Nan' special available on BBC iPlayer, and is classed as an episode of the original series.
| 22 | 2 | "Nan" | Geoff Posner | Catherine Tate, Brett Goldstein & Dan Swimmer | 4 January 2014 | 4.47 |
While Jamie, Nan's grandson, is away in Africa doing voluntary work, a young girl called Alice has been allocated to Nan by the Young and Old Buddy-Up Foundation to keep her company and cheer her up. Alice soon discovers that Nan's kitchen tap is broken, and accompanies her to the council office to arrange to get it fixed. Unfortunately Nan, in her usual style, causes mayhem and upset at the offices, ending with her being given a community service order to work in the local hospital. Meanwhile Jamie, who is Skyping regularly from Africa, is concerned when he sees Nan in hospital, thinking she is seriously ill. At the same time, new neighbours have moved in across the corridor, and Nan gets involved in preparations for their family wedding party.
| 23 | 3 | "Nanger Management" | Geoff Posner | Catherine Tate, Brett Goldstein & Dan Swimmer | 27 December 2015 | 3.14 |
Nan's aggressive attitude to harmless pensioners finally gets her into trouble with the police, and she's forced to attend anger management classes. However, her course leader, Mr Fanée, is revealed to be struggling with some latent issues of his own, which are in danger of being brought bubbling back to the surface. Meanwhile, Jamie joins forces with Nan's kindly new neighbour to raise funds for the local zoo, with unexpectedly dramatic results. Special guest Warwick Davis
| 24 | 4 | "Knees Up Wilmott-Brown" | Geoff Posner | Catherine Tate, Brett Goldstein & Dan Swimmer | 30 December 2015 | 2.97 |
When the freehold on Nan's block of flats in London's newly fashionable East End is bought up by some ruthless property developers, all the residents join together to fight for their survival. All except Nan, that is, who, having bought her own flat in the 1980s, finds herself holding a unique position of power over the developers and their oily representative, the unfortunate Charles Wilmott (Adam James). Plus Nan appears on Newsnight. Special guest Evan Davis as himself

== Reception ==
=== Ratings ===
| No. | Title | Air date | Timeslot | UK viewers (millions) | Rank | Ref(s) |
|---|---|---|---|---|---|---|
| 1 | Nan's Christmas Carol | 25 December 2009 | Friday 10.30pm | 8,640,000 | 10 | |
| 2 | Nan | 4 January 2014 | Saturday 9.30pm | 4,470,000 | < 30 | |
| 3 | Nanger Management | 27 December 2015 | Sunday 10.25pm | 3,140,000 | < 30 | |
| 4 | Knees Up Wilmott-Brown | 30 December 2015 | Wednesday 10.25pm | 2,970,000 | < 30 | |

Note: Viewing figures for the three specials between 2014 and 2015 were not available from BARB's website, as they were below the top 30 programmes of those weeks.

=== Awards and nominations ===
- BAFTA TV Awards
  - British Academy Television Award for Best Female Comedy Performance – Catherine Tate (nominated).

== Availability ==
=== Home media ===
Nan's Christmas Carol (as 'The Catherine Tate Show: Nan's Xmas Carol') was released on Region 2 DVD in the United Kingdom via 2 Entertain on 29 November 2010. The special, which is now established as the first episode of the 'Nan' specials, was again made available aside the three specials from 2014 to 2015 under "Catherine Tate's Nan: The Specials", which was made available from 2Entertain on 18 January 2016.

=== Streaming ===
Available for streaming via Amazon Prime Video:

- Nan's Christmas Carol
- Nan
- Nanger Management & Knees Up Wilmott-Brown
