= Gordon Anderson (director) =

British television director

Gordon Anderson is a British television director, best known for his work on Lovesick, Shameless, Fresh Meat and The Inbetweeners.

He began his career in the theatre, directing at many of the UK's theatre and opera companies including the Royal National Theatre, the Royal Shakespeare Company, the Royal Court, Bristol Old Vic, Manchester Royal Exchange, Scottish Opera and English Touring Opera.

He was Artistic Director of ATC (2001–2007) where he commissioned, developed and directed new plays and new translations of contemporary international plays which toured throughout the UK.

He trained as a television director at the BBC and went on to direct and write for The Catherine Tate Show.

== Filmography ==
- Suburban Shootout (2006–2007)
- The Catherine Tate Show (2004–2007)
- The Inbetweeners (2008–2009)
- Lovesick (2014–2016)
- Endeavour (TV series) (2018)
- Shetland (TV series) (2019)
- The Mallorca Files (TV series) (2019)
- Grantchester (TV series) (2020)
- Silent Witness (TV series) (2021)
