= Mathew Horne =

English actor

- Born: Mathew Frazer Horne; 6 September 1978 (age 48); Burton Joyce, Nottinghamshire, England
- Occupations: Actor; comedian; television presenter; narrator; singer
- Years active: 2000–present
- Spouse: Celina Bassili (m. 2021)

Mathew Frazer Horne (born 6 September 1978) is an English actor, comedian and television presenter. He has appeared on several BBC sketch shows and sitcoms, including Gavin & Stacey (as Gavin Shipman), The Catherine Tate Show, Horne & Corden, and Bad Education.

== Early life ==
Mathew Frazer Horne was born on 6 September 1978 in Burton Joyce, Nottinghamshire. He attended Burton Joyce Primary School. While at school, he played in goal for Notts County juniors. He studied A level performing arts at Southwell Minster School in Nottinghamshire and gained a degree in drama from the University of Manchester. He met Bruce Mackinnon there in the first few weeks of term. They realised they shared a similar sense of humour but did not write material together until the third year of their studies.

== Career ==
Horne began his career as a comedian and became half of comedy duo Mat and MacKinnon, first performing at the Edinburgh Fringe in 2000. He was spotted at the festival by Catherine Tate, who invited him to perform in the BBC TV programme The Catherine Tate Show. Since then, Horne has continued to appear in several Catherine Tate's Nan specials. He reprised his role as Jamie in two festive episodes of Catherine Tate's Nan in 2015.

In 2003, he starred in Channel 4's 20 Things to do Before You're 30 and in the following year he earned the role of Ben, an atheist RE teacher, in Channel 4 series Teachers. He also appeared in the first series of ITV production Doc Martin. In 2005, Horne appeared in an episode of The Smoking Room, playing Dominic, the nephew of Janet. The latter was conducting a psychological study of the employees. In 2007 he starred in BBC sitcom Roman's Empire and in November appeared in comedy sketches in The Kylie Show on ITV1 alongside Kylie Minogue, playing her assistant.

Horne was also a guest star in the second series of Robin Hood. From 2007 to 2024 he starred in double-BAFTA-winning series Gavin & Stacey as main character Gavin Shipman, a kind-hearted young man who gets together with a girl he has met through their work phone calls and falls in love with her. The programme ran for three series with a Christmas special and received widespread critical acclaim. He returned to this role for a Christmas special in 2019. In May 2024, it was announced that a final episode of Gavin & Stacey, to be broadcast on Christmas Day 2024, had been written. In 2008, Horne appeared in a modern adaptation of the Three Billy Goats Gruff as part of the BBC's Fairy Tales season. He also narrated the ITV2 series The Passions of Girls Aloud.

Horne starred in the film Lesbian Vampire Killers alongside James Corden and made his stage debut in a 2009 revival of Entertaining Mr Sloane at the Trafalgar Studios. On 3 April 2009, it was reported that Horne had collapsed on-stage during a West End performance of the play. He remained on stage until medical assistance arrived, at which point he was taken to the hospital. A statement was subsequently released saying he was exhausted after working "flat out" for three months. It was later revealed he was suffering from a virus.

On 18 February 2009, he presented the 2009 BRIT Awards alongside James Corden and Kylie Minogue.

In 2010, Horne appeared in an episode of Agatha Christie's Marple, named "The Secret of Chimneys", as Bill Eversleigh. He appeared alongside fellow Gavin & Stacey star Ruth Jones.

He played Culture Club drummer Jon Moss in the 2010 BBC TV docudrama Worried About the Boy, about the teenage years of Boy George.

In 2016, Horne toured British theatres with Catherine Tate in The Catherine Tate Show Live. He also appeared as a young Mr. Grace in Are You Being Served?.

He played Private Walker in Dad's Army: The Missing Episodes, in the 2019 UKTV Original produced series. He starred in all three episodes aired on the TV channel Gold.

In early 2019, an announcement was made that Catherine Tate's Nan would be developed into a feature film adaptation. The film was scheduled to be released on 19 June 2020 but was indefinitely postponed due to cinemas being closed because of the COVID-19 pandemic. The trailer and poster for the film were released on 18 February 2022 with Josie Rourke receiving an executive producer credit and no director credited. The film was released on 18 March 2022.

In 2021, Horne began voicing Marvin, an anthropomorphic mole in an advertising campaign for Vision Express.

In May 2022, Horne appeared as Edgar in series 8, episode 4 of the BBC dark comedy series, Inside No. 9, "Love Is A Stranger".

=== Work with James Corden ===
Since working on the BBC sitcom Gavin & Stacey, Horne has collaborated several times with its co-creator James Corden.

Horne and Corden presented the Big Brother spin-off show Big Brother's Big Mouth as guests in 2007 and were then regulars for the run covering E4's Big Brother: Celebrity Hijack. They presented the NME Shockwaves Awards together in 2008 and a section of Comic Relief in March 2009. In 2008, the pair toured the UK with a stand-up show in preparation for their BBC sketch show Horne & Corden. The first episode was broadcast on 10 March 2009 on BBC Three. It was presented in front of a live audience, in a style reminiscent of Morecambe and Wise or The Two Ronnies. A variety of pre-filmed sketches and live performances were included.

2009 also saw the release of Lesbian Vampire Killers, a comedy horror film. Reviews of the film were largely negative. It holds a 29% approval rating on review aggregator Rotten Tomatoes with an average score of 4/10. James Christopher of The Times described it as "profoundly awful", stating that it is an "instantly forgettable lads' mag farce" and an "appalling waste of a perfectly decent title". Anthony Quinn, writing in The Independent, gave the film 1 star out of 5, describing it as woeful and stating Horne and Corden had "overstretched their appeal" and looked in danger of becoming today's Hale and Pace. Peter Bradshaw of The Guardian described the film as "mostly pretty awful, but there are one or two crass laughs". Nicholas Yanes of Scifipulse.net found it to be "a great B film" worth becoming a cult classic.

Horne appeared alongside Corden in the CGI film Planet 51, with a minor part voicing a soldier, Vesklin.

== Personal life ==
Horne divides his time between homes in East London and Helmsdale in the Scottish Highlands. He is a fan of Tottenham Hotspur F.C. and has often been seen at Tottenham Hotspur Stadium. He is also the narrator of the stadium's multimedia tour device.

On 20 December 2018, Horne was struck by a train as he was crossing the railway line after leaving the Lord Nelson pub near to his parents' home in Burton Joyce, Nottinghamshire. He was said not to have been injured and had been near a dedicated pedestrian crossing across the Nottingham to Newark railway line.

Horne was engaged to actress Evelyn Hoskins until 2018. He married the set-designer Celina Bassili in September 2021 in Norway. They had been romantically linked since July 2019.

== Filmography ==
=== Film ===
Year	Title	Role	Notes
2004	Vanity Fair	Casino Boy	
2005	A.W.	Teen	Short film
2006	Stingray	Kurt	Short film
2008	Trimming the Fat	Sutcliffe	Short film
2009	Planet 51	Soldier Vesklin	voice
2009	Lesbian Vampire Killers	Jimmy	
2011	Horrid Henry: The Movie	Henry & Peter’s Dad	
2014	Breaking the Bank	Nick	
2015	The Bad Education Movie	Shaquille Fraser	
2020	The Existential Hotline	Soren	Short film
2022	The Nan Movie	Jamie	
2022	Everybody Dies... Sometimes	Therapist	Short film

=== Television ===
Year	Title	Role	Notes
2001	Noble and Silver: Get Off Me!	Housemate	
2002	Being April	Whiffy	Episode: "Normal"
2003	20 Things to Do Before You're 30	Conrad	8 episodes
2004	Teachers	Ben Birkett	9 episodes
2004	Doc Martin	Ed Johnson	Episode: "Shit Happens"
2004–2007	The Catherine Tate Show	Various Characters	20 episodes
2005	Carrie & Barry	Adrian	
2005	The Smoking Room	Dominic	Episode: "Buzzzzzzz"
2005	Our Hidden Lives	Davy	TV film
2005	Nathan Barley	Shop Assistant	2 episodes
2005	Blessed	Matt	Episode: "Let's Spend the Night Together"
2006	Losing It	Mike	TV film
2007	Roman's Empire	Leo	6 episodes
2007	The Kylie Show	Paul	
2007	Robin Hood	The Fool	Episode: "Lardner's Ring"
2007	Big Brother's Big Mouth	Guest Presenter	
2007–2010, 2019, 2024	Gavin & Stacey	Gavin Shipman	21 episodes
2008	Big Brother: Celebrity Hijack	Presenter	
2008	The Passions of Girls Aloud	Narrator	
2008	Fairy Tales	Dean Gruff	Episode: "Billy Goat"
2009	Horne & Corden	Various Characters	6 episodes; also writer
2009	Nan's Christmas Carol	Jamie Taylor	TV special
2009–2012	Phineas and Ferb	Blay'n	2 episodes
2010	Worried About the Boy	Jon Moss	TV film
2010	Agatha Christie's Marple	Bill Eversleigh	Episode: "The Secret of Chimneys"
2010	Chekhov Comedy Shorts	Lomov	Episode: "The Proposal"
2011	Sounds from the Cities	Himself	
2012	Sinbad	Philippe	Episode: "Fiend or Friend?"
2012–2014, 2022–2024	Bad Education	Shaquille Fraser	33 episodes
2013	Death in Paradise	Leo Downs	Episode: "A Stormy Occurrence"
2013	Playhouse Presents	Johnny	Episode: "Hey Diddly Dee"
2014–2015	Catherine Tate's Nan	Jamie Taylor	3 episodes
2014–2022	Agatha Raisin	Roy Silver	17 episodes
2015–2017	Drunk History	Various Characters	6 episodes
2016	Are You Being Served?	Young Mr Grace	TV film
2016	Dating in the Dark	Narrator	6 episodes
2017	Porters	Mark	Episode: "Episode One"
2018	Settling	Seamus	Web series; 6 episodes
2019	Dad's Army: The Lost Episodes	Private Walker	3 episodes
2022	Newark, Newark	Terry	3 episodes
2023	Inside No. 9	Edgar	Series 8 episode 4

=== Stage ===
Year	Title	Role	Venue
2001	Blue Remembered Hills	Raymond	Courtyard Theatre
2001–2002	Mat and MacKinnon	Various Characters	Edinburgh Festival / Soho Theatre / Comedy Store
2002	A Day in the Death of Joe Egg	Bri	West End
2009	Entertaining Mr Sloane	Sloane	Trafalgar Theatre
2012	Charley's Aunt	Lord Fancourt Babberley	Menier Chocolate Factory
2013–2014	The Pride	The Doctor / The Man / Peter	Trafalgar Theatre
2016	The Catherine Tate Show Live	Various Characters	Various venues across the UK
2017	The Miser	Valère	Garrick Theatre
2018	Rain Man	Raymond	Windsor Theatre Royal
2022	The Homecoming	Lenny	Theatre Royal Bath
2023	Noises Off	Garry Lejeune	Theatre Royal Haymarket
2024-2025	The Tempest	Trinculo	Theatre Royal, Drury Lane

=== Radio ===
Year	Title	Role	Production	Notes
2010	A Cinema Near You	Alex	BBC Radio 2	1 episode
2013–2015	Seekers	Stuart	BBC Radio 4	12 episodes
2016	Blood, Sex and Money	Lazare Chanteau	BBC Radio 4	1 episode

== Awards and nominations ==
Year	Award	Category	Work	Result	Ref.
2007	British Comedy Awards	Best Male Comedy Newcomer	Gavin & Stacey	Nominated	
2017	National Film Awards	Best Actor	Breaking the Bank	Nominated	
2020	Aphrodite Film Awards	Best Actor	The Existential Hotline	Nominated	
2021	National Film Awards	Best Actor in a TV Series	Gavin & Stacey (Christmas special)	Won	
2022	National Film Awards	Best Supporting Actor	The Nan Movie	Won	
