= List of Benidorm episodes =

This is a list of episodes from the British television series Benidorm.

== Series overview ==
Series	Episodes	Originally released		Series average (in millions)
Series	Episodes	First released	Last released	Series average (in millions)
1	6	1 February 2007	8 March 2007	4.43
2	8	28 March 2008	16 May 2008	5.98
3	1	31 May 2009		5.23
3	6	2 October 2009	6 November 2009	6.52
4	1	26 December 2010		7.41
4	6	25 February 2011	8 April 2011	7.77
5	7	24 February 2012	6 April 2012	7.06
6	7	2 January 2014	13 February 2014	6.76
7	7	2 January 2015	13 February 2015	5.60
8	7	11 January 2016	22 February 2016	5.32
9	9	1 March 2017	3 May 2017	4.78
10	9	28 February 2018	2 May 2018	4.98

== Episodes ==
=== Series 1 (2007) ===
No.	Title	Directed by	Written by	Original release date	UK viewers (millions)
1	"Episode 1"	Kevin Allen	Derren Litten	1 February 2007	5.86
2	"Episode 2"	Kevin Allen	Derren Litten	8 February 2007	4.86
3	"Episode 3"	Kevin Allen	Derren Litten	15 February 2007	3.88
4	"Episode 4"	Kevin Allen	Derren Litten	22 February 2007	4.02
5	"Episode 5"	Kevin Allen	Derren Litten	1 March 2007	3.85
6	"Episode 6"	Kevin Allen	Derren Litten	8 March 2007	4.13

=== Series 2 (2008) ===
No. overall	Episode	Directed by	Written by	Original release date	UK viewers (millions)
7	"Episode 1"	Sandy Johnson	Derren Litten	28 March 2008	7.14
8	"Episode 2"	Sandy Johnson	Derren Litten	4 April 2008	6.05
9	"Episode 3"	Sandy Johnson	Derren Litten	11 April 2008	5.59
10	"Episode 4"	Sandy Johnson	Derren Litten	18 April 2008	6.29
11	"Episode 5"	Sandy Johnson	Derren Litten	25 April 2008	5.70
12	"Episode 6"	Sandy Johnson	Derren Litten	2 May 2008	5.21
13	"Episode 7"	Sandy Johnson	Derren Litten	9 May 2008	5.57
14	"Episode 8"	Sandy Johnson	Derren Litten	16 May 2008	6.32

=== Series 3 (2009) ===
No. overall	Episode	Directed by	Written by	Original release date	UK viewers (millions)
Special
15	"Summer Special"	Sandy Johnson	Derren Litten	31 May 2009	5.23
Series
16	"Episode 1"	Sandy Johnson	Derren Litten	2 October 2009	6.50
17	"Episode 2"	Sandy Johnson	Derren Litten	9 October 2009	6.17
18	"Episode 3"	Sandy Johnson	Derren Litten	16 October 2009	6.38
19	"Episode 4"	Sandy Johnson	Derren Litten	23 October 2009	6.68
20	"Episode 5"	Sandy Johnson	Derren Litten	30 October 2009	6.61
21	"Episode 6"	Sandy Johnson	Derren Litten	6 November 2009	6.80

=== Series 4 (2011) ===
No. overall	Episode	Directed by	Written by	Original release date	UK viewers (millions)
Special
22	"Christmas Special"	John Henderson	Derren Litten	26 December 2010	7.41 (Note: 6.78 million on ITV, 628,000 on ITV HD)
Series
23	"Episode 1"	Sandy Johnson	Derren Litten	25 February 2011	8.61 (Note: 7.51 million on ITV, 709,000 on ITV HD, 390,000 on ITV +1)
24	"Episode 2"	Sandy Johnson	Derren Litten	4 March 2011	8.11 (Note: 6.92 million on ITV, 779,000 on ITV HD, 410,000 on ITV +1)
25	"Episode 3"	Sandy Johnson	Derren Litten	11 March 2011	7.43 (Note: 6.37 million on ITV, 685,000 on ITV HD, 370,000 on ITV +1)
26	"Episode 4"	Sandy Johnson	Derren Litten	25 March 2011	7.41 (Note: 6.41 million on ITV, 577,000 on ITV HD, 420,000 on ITV +1)
27	"Episode 5"	Sandy Johnson	Derren Litten	1 April 2011	7.24 (Note: 6.16 million on ITV, 665,000 on ITV HD, 410,000 on ITV +1)
28	"Episode 6"	Sandy Johnson	Derren Litten	8 April 2011	7.82 (Note: 6.83 million on ITV, 690,000 on ITV HD, 302,000 on ITV +1)

=== Series 5 (2012) ===
No. overall	Episode	Directed by	Written by	Original release date	UK viewers (millions)
29	"Episode 1"	John Henderson	Derren Litten	24 February 2012	7.72 (Note: 6.48 million on ITV, 754,000 on ITV HD, 491,000 on ITV +1)
30	"Episode 2"	John Henderson	Derren Litten	2 March 2012	7.42 (Note: 6.21 million on ITV, 627,000 on ITV HD, 582,000 on ITV +1)
31	"Episode 3"	John Henderson	Steve Pemberton	9 March 2012	7.56 (Note: 6.28 million on ITV, 728,000 on ITV HD, 548,000 on ITV +1)
32	"Episode 4"	John Henderson	Neil Fitzmaurice	16 March 2012	7.06 (Note: 5.99 million on ITV, 636,000 on ITV HD, 430,000 on ITV +1)
33	"Episode 5"	John Henderson	Steve Pemberton	23 March 2012	6.41 (Note: 5.32 million on ITV, 544,000 on ITV HD, 544,000 on ITV +1)
34	"Episode 6"	Sandy Johnson	Steve Pemberton	30 March 2012	6.90 (Note: 5.83 million on ITV, 650,000 on ITV HD, 421,000 on ITV +1)
35	"Episode 7"	Sandy Johnson	Derren Litten	6 April 2012	6.37 (Note: 5.66 million on ITV, 707,000 on ITV HD)
Sport Relief sketch (2012)
N–A	"Benidorm's Got Talent"	Johnathan Bullen	Derren Litten	23 March 2012	5.92

=== Series 6 (2014) ===
No. overall	Episode	Directed by	Written by	Original release date	UK viewers (millions)
36	"Episode 1"	David Sant	Derren Litten	2 January 2014	7.95 (Note: 6.36 million on ITV, 815,000 on ITV HD, 767,000 on ITV +1)
37	"Episode 2"	David Sant	Derren Litten	9 January 2014	6.92 (Note: 5.48 million on ITV, 799,000 on ITV HD, 644,000 on ITV +1)
38	"Episode 3"	David Sant	Derren Litten	16 January 2014	6.42 (Note: 4.99 million on ITV, 710,000 on ITV HD, 715,000 on ITV +1)
39	"Episode 4"	David Sant	Derren Litten	23 January 2014	6.44 (Note: 4.97 million on ITV, 827,000 on ITV HD, 638,000 on ITV +1.)
40	"Episode 5"	Sandy Johnson	Derren Litten	30 January 2014	6.15 (Note: 4.87 million on ITV, 795,000 on ITV HD, 484,000 on ITV +1.)
41	"Episode 6"	Sandy Johnson	Derren Litten	6 February 2014	6.46 (Note: 5.21 million on ITV, 787,000 on ITV HD, 465,000 on ITV +1.)
42	"Episode 7"	Sandy Johnson	Derren Litten	13 February 2014	7.01

=== Series 7 (2015) ===
No. overall	Episode	Directed by	Written by	Original release date	UK viewers (millions)
43	"Episode 1"	David Sant	Derren Litten	2 January 2015	7.27 (Note: 5.72 million on ITV, 1.04 million on ITV HD, 510,000 on ITV +1)
44	"Episode 2"	David Sant	Derren Litten	9 January 2015	5.41 (Note: 4.84 million on ITV, 574,000 on ITV +1)
45	"Episode 3"	David Sant	Derren Litten	16 January 2015	5.45 (Note: 4.76 million on ITV, 687,000 on ITV +1)
46	"Episode 4"	David Sant	Derren Litten	23 January 2015	5.47 (Note: 4.70 million on ITV, 767,000 on ITV +1)
47	"Episode 5"	Sandy Johnson	Derren Litten	30 January 2015	5.40 (Note: 4.80 million on ITV, 602,000 on ITV +1)
48	"Episode 6"	Sandy Johnson	Derren Litten	6 February 2015	4.79 (Note: 4.10 million on ITV, 689,000 on ITV +1)
49	"Episode 7"	Sandy Johnson	Derren Litten	13 February 2015	5.40 (Note: 4.72 million on ITV, 681,000 on ITV +1)

=== Series 8 (2016) ===
No. overall	Episode	Directed by	Written by	Original release date	UK viewers (millions)
50	"Episode 1"	Robin Shepperd	Derren Litten	11 January 2016	6.82 (Note: 4.91 million on ITV, 1.30 million on ITV HD, 613,000 on ITV +1)
51	"Episode 2"	Robin Shepperd	Derren Litten	18 January 2016	5.05 (Note: 4.44 million on ITV, 608,000 on ITV +1)
52	"Episode 3"	Robin Shepperd	Derren Litten	25 January 2016	5.09 (Note: 4.48 million on ITV, 610,000 on ITV +1)
53	"Episode 4"	Robin Shepperd	Derren Litten & Gaby Hull	1 February 2016	4.68 (Note: 4.15 million on ITV, 534,000 on ITV +1)
54	"Episode 5"	David Sant	Derren Litten & Gaby Hull	8 February 2016	6.09 (Note: 4.43 million on ITV, 1.15 million on ITV HD, 513,000 on ITV +1)
55	"Episode 6"	David Sant	Derren Litten & Gaby Hull	15 February 2016	4.84 (Note: 4.32 million on ITV, 521,000 on ITV +1)
56	"Episode 7"	David Sant	Derren Litten	22 February 2016	4.68 (Note: 4.22 million on ITV, 463,000 on ITV +1)

=== Series 9 (2017) ===
No. overall	Episode	Directed by	Written by	Original release date	UK viewers (millions)
57	"Episode 1"	Robin Shepperd	Derren Litten	1 March 2017	5.79
58	"Episode 2"	Robin Shepperd	Derren Litten	8 March 2017	4.95
59	"Episode 3"	Robin Shepperd	Derren Litten & Gaby Hull	15 March 2017	4.84
60	"Episode 4"	Robin Shepperd	Derren Litten & Gaby Hull	29 March 2017	4.59
61	"Episode 5"	David Sant	Derren Litten	5 April 2017	4.46
62	"Episode 6"	David Sant	Mark Brotherhood	12 April 2017	4.72
63	"Episode 7"	David Sant	Damon Rochefort & Mark Brotherhood	19 April 2017	4.62
64	"Episode 8"	David Sant	Derren Litten	26 April 2017	4.69
65	"Episode 9"	David Sant	Derren Litten	3 May 2017	4.46

=== Series 10 (2018) ===
No. overall	Episode	Directed by	Written by	Original release date	UK viewers (millions)
66	"Episode 1"	David Sant	Derren Litten	28 February 2018	5.77
67	"Episode 2"	David Sant	Derren Litten	7 March 2018	5.89
68	"Episode 3"	David Sant	Derren Litten	14 March 2018	5.15
69	"Episode 4"	David Sant	Mark Brotherhood	21 March 2018	5.60
70	"Episode 5"	David Sant	Mark Brotherhood	4 April 2018	5.30
71	"Episode 6"	Duncan Foster	Mark Brotherhood	11 April 2018	4.96
72	"Episode 7"	Duncan Foster	Mark Brotherhood	18 April 2018	4.54
73	"Episode 8"	Derren Litten	Derren Litten	25 April 2018	4.50
74	"Episode 9"	Derren Litten	Derren Litten	2 May 2018	4.45

== Specials ==
=== 10th Anniversary Documentary (2018) ===
No. overall	Episode	Directed by	Written by	Original release date	UK viewers (millions)
N–A	"Benidorm: 10 Years on Holiday"	N/A	N/A	20 February 2018	N/A
First screened in 2007 in a 30-minute format, the show grew to be hugely popular with ITV viewers and was BAFTA-nominated and won numerous TV awards over the years, including two National TV Awards. The show's creator and writer Derren Litten guides viewers around Benidorm to reveal how the show was created, whilst visiting the show's many real-life locations. Cast members past and present talk about their roles on the show, alongside show bloopers and behind-the-scenes footage of the upcoming 10th series being filmed. All the actors who played members of the Garvey family – Steve Pemberton, Siobhan Finneran, Sheila Reid, Ollie Stokes and Hannah Hobley – return for the one-off special to talk about their time on the show.

== Ratings ==
Benidorm : UK viewers per episode (millions)

Season	Episode number									Average
Season	1	2	3	4	5	6	7	8	9	Average
1	5.86	4.86	3.88	4.02	3.85	4.13	–			4.43
2	7.14	6.05	5.59	6.29	5.70	5.21	5.57	6.32	–	5.98
3	6.50	6.17	6.38	6.68	6.61	6.80	–			6.52
4	8.61	8.11	7.43	7.41	7.24	7.82	–			7.77
5	7.72	7.42	7.56	7.06	6.41	6.90	6.37	–		7.06
6	7.95	6.92	6.42	6.44	6.15	6.46	7.01	–		6.76
7	7.27	5.41	5.45	5.47	5.40	4.79	5.40	–		5.60
8	6.82	5.05	5.09	4.68	6.09	4.84	4.68	–		5.32
9	5.79	4.95	4.84	4.59	4.46	4.72	4.62	4.69	4.32	4.78
10	5.77	5.89	5.15	5.60	5.09	4.70	4.36	4.14	4.13	4.98

Audience measurement performed by Broadcasters' Audience Research Board
