= The Tower (TV series) =

British police procedural television series

- Genre: Police procedural drama
- Created by: Kate London
- Based on: Post Mortem by Kate London
- Developed by: Windhover Films
- Starring: Gemma Whelan; Tahirah Sharif; Jimmy Akingbola; Emmett J. Scanlan; Karl Davies
- Music by: Nainita Desai
- Country of origin: United Kingdom
- Original language: English
- No. of series: 3
- No. of episodes: 11

Production
- Executive producers: Patrick Harbinson; Kate London; Damien Timmer
- Producers: Paul Testar; Andy Mosse; Charles Bates
- Cinematography: Anna Patarakina; Ashley Barron; Tasha Back
- Editors: Gez Morris; Alex Kalmakrian; Miguel Lloro Javierre; William Blunden; Tom Henson-Webb
- Running time: 150 minutes
- Production companies: Mammoth Screen; Windhover Films

Original release
- Network: ITV
- Release: 8 November 2021 – 5 September 2024

The Tower is a British police procedural television series based on Kate London's Metropolitan book series. Set in London, it stars Gemma Whelan as police officer Sarah Collins, initially from the fictional DSI department. The first series follows the aftermath of the deaths of a veteran Metropolitan Police officer and a young Libyan girl who fell together from the roof of a London tower block. When Constable Lizzie Adama—one of the only witnesses—disappears soon afterwards, Collins' investigation becomes two-pronged: what happened on the roof, and finding Adama.

Although the series is set in southeast London, it was mostly filmed in the northwest of England, particularly Liverpool and Manchester. The first series of The Tower was broadcast over three 50-minute episodes in November 2021. Patrick Harbinson acted as both screenwriter and executive producer. The show received generally favourable reviews, with positive comparisons being made by critics to fellow police corruption drama Line of Duty; Whelan's acting was considered a highlight. Criticisms were also made, particularly of the sound engineering, which was accused of muffling the spoken dialogue on occasion.

== Cast ==
- Gemma Whelan as Sarah Collins, a detective sergeant
- Tahirah Sharif as Lizzie Adama
- Jimmy Akingbola as Steve Bradshaw, a detective constable
- Emmett J. Scanlan as Kieran Shaw, a police inspector
- Lola Elsokari as Farah Mehenni
- Nick Holder as Hadley Matthews, a police constable
- Karl Davies as Tim Baillie, a detective chief inspector
- Nabil Elouahabi as Younes Mehenni
- Laurie Delaney as Mary Shaw
- Camilla Beeput as Julie Woodson
- Michael Karim as Arif Johar, a police constable
- Harriet Webb as Alice Parker, a detective constable
- Rex Parry as Ben Stoddard
- Niamh Cusack as Claire Mills
- David O'Reilly as Ash Curran, a detective sergeant

=== Cast background ===
Gemma Whelan is probably best known as her character Yara Greyjoy in the HBO series Game of Thrones; Collins is her first primetime lead character. Tahirah Sharif was previously seen in The Haunting of Bly Manor and played minor characters in soaps such as Waterloo Road and Casualty. Jimmy Akingbola had roles in Kate & Koji and Holby City, Emmett J. Scanlan and Nick Holder were both in Peaky Blinders, while Nabil Elouhabi has had parts in EastEnders, Deep State, His Dark Materials and Only Fools and Horses. Karl Davies had previously appeared in Kingdom, Emmerdale, Happy Valley, Brief Encounters, and Chernobyl, while The Tower was Lola Elsokari's and Rex Parry's first television roles.

=== Characters ===
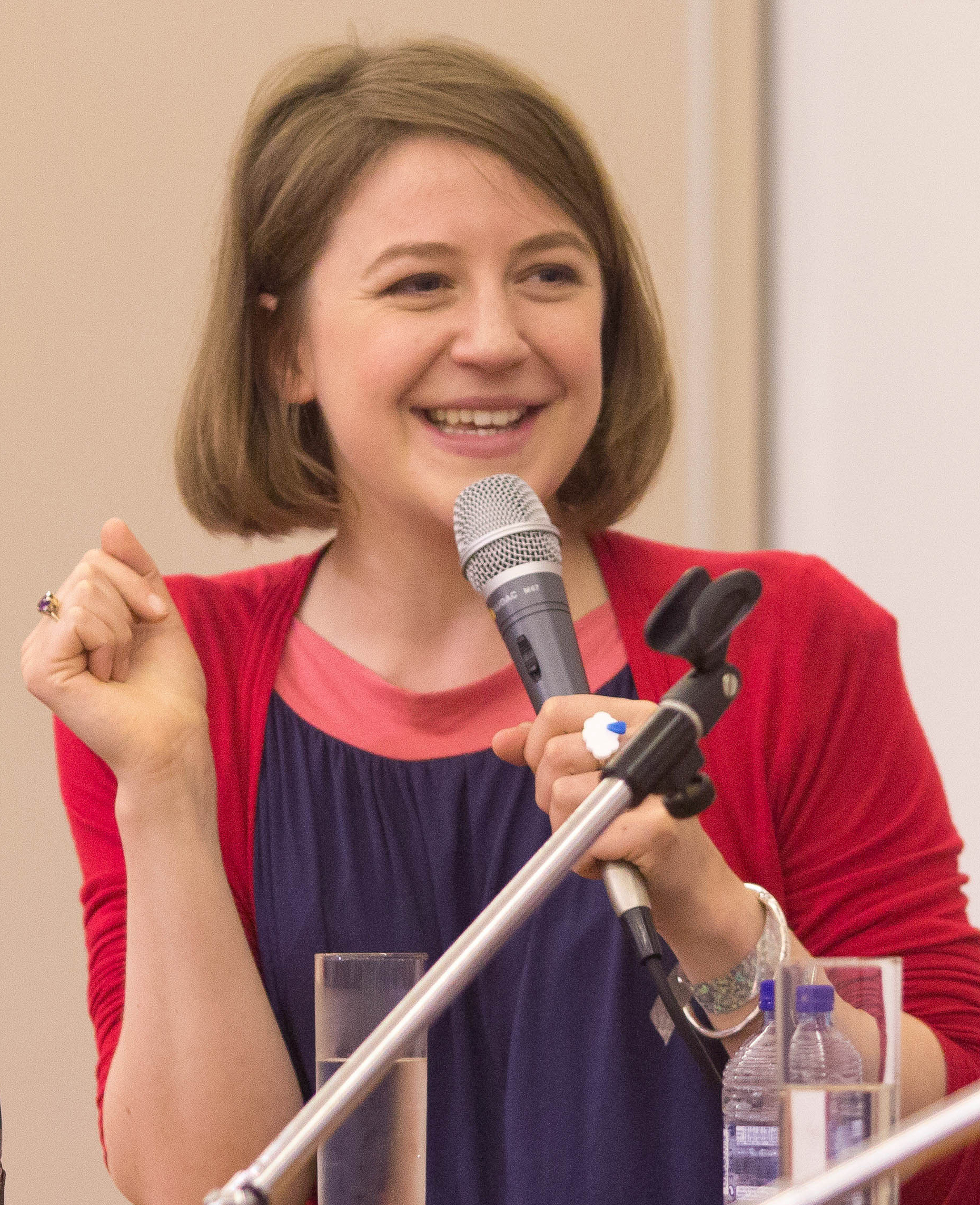
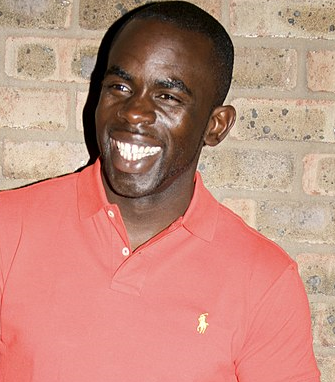
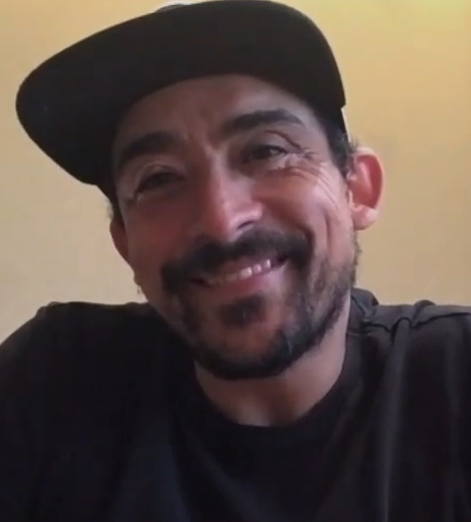
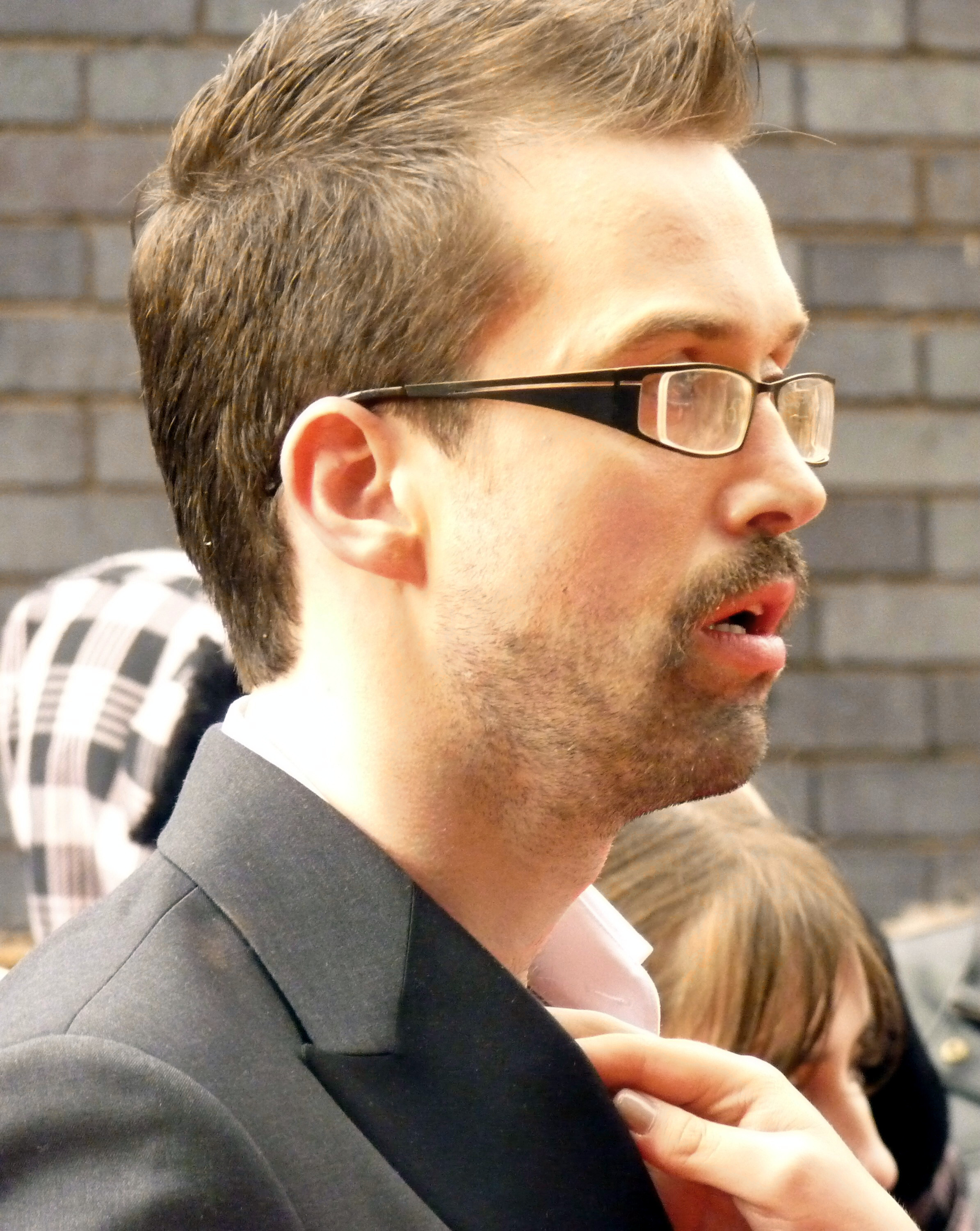
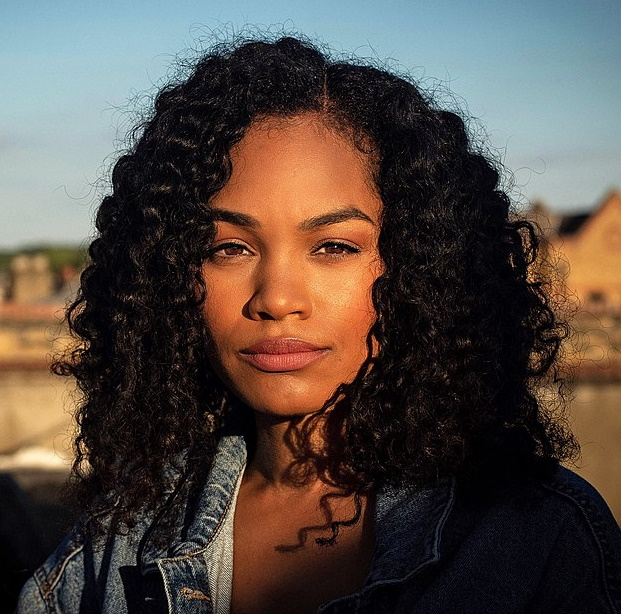
Clockwise from top: Gemma Whelan, Nabil Elouahabi, Tahirah Sharif, Emmett J Scanlan, Jimmy Akingbola, who played the main characters of the first series.

DS Collins—described by The Guardian's Hollie Richardson as "a heavy-sighing, perma-frown primetime detective" and an "outlier and an outsider"—is a Detective Sergeant from the Directorate of Special Investigations. The Telegraph suggested that she displayed a "rigid attention to detail at work that masks a sadness in her personal life, which seems to be represented by a signature anorak that is the colour of a dying autumn leaf". Ed Cumming of The Independent, summarises her as "a single, gay, childless cop: it's made to look like a thankless gig".

PC Lizzie Adama is a newly qualified rookie, having been in the MPS for six months. Constable Matthews, a veteran cop of the old school, aspires to become a police training officer. He is only seen in flashbacks. Kieran Shaw is Adama's and Matthews' immediate superior and has been engaging in an extramarital affair with the former. His relationship with the DSI team becomes increasingly fractious, and Collins suspects him of knowing far more about Adama's disappearance than he is letting on. However, he is protected by his superior, DCI Tim Baillie, until the last episode in the series.

== Production ==
The show was commissioned by ITV and produced in three 50-minute episodes by Mammoth Screen—a subsidiary of ITV—and Windhover Films, owned by Harbinson. It was produced and edited by Paul Testar and Gez Morris respectively. Several different scenarists were considered before Patrick Harbinson, who had previously co-produced the Showtime series Homeland, was chosen as both writer and executive producer. It was directed by Jim Loach and developed for television by Sly Fox Productions. In describing the premise of the first series, Harbinson said:

It's a story of a typical London street – two families living cheek by jowl – one English white and middle-class, the other Libyan refugees, just settled in the community after two years of limbo in hostels and refugee camps. A dispute arises between them, basically out of nothing, and then escalates. And it's also the story of a typical London police station, whose officers have to deal with that dispute.

=== Locations ===
The COVID-19 pandemic prevented Harbinson from doing the usual thorough location searches, and he had to rely on images being Dropboxxed to him from around the country. Although set in southeast London, The Tower was predominantly filmed in northwest England, with a week spent in London during post-production doing pick-up shots, particularly of the City of London skyline. Northern locations included Liverpool, Manchester, Runcorn, Warrington and Knutsford's Tatton Park. Sharif later recalled the scenes filmed in Liverpool as particularly difficult due to pervasive rain, which made her "emotional, heavy dialogue... challenging". The disused cellars of the Martins Bank Building in Liverpool were used to replicate the police cellblock.

== Episodes ==
Series	Title	Episodes	Originally released		
Series	Title	Episodes	First released	Last released	Network
1	The Tower	3	8 November 2021	10 November 2021	ITV
2	The Tower II: Death Message	4	16 May 2023	6 June 2023	BritBox
3	The Tower III: Gallowstree Lane	4	2 September 2024	5 September 2024	ITV

=== Series 1 (2021) ===
No. overall	No. in series	Title	Directed by	Written by	Original release date	UK viewers (millions) (Note: Final ratings are sourced from BARB)
1	1	"Episode 1"	Jim Loach	Patrick Harbinson	8 November 2021	5.57
Collins and Bradshaw are called to Portland Tower, southeast London, where a police constable and a teenage girl, Farah, have fallen to their deaths. On the tower's rooftop Collins finds Inspector Kieran Shaw, PC Lizzie Adama, and 5-year-old Ben Stoddard, Farah's next-door neighbour, whom she had brought with her. At Adama's police station, Collins discovers that Adama is an important witness in an approaching case against a local gangster. Meanwhile, Bradshaw discovers that Adama has disappeared. Collins visits Mrs Stoddard who refuses to let her talk to Ben. At Farah's post mortem, Adama's phone number is found in her pocket; Collins and Bradshaw get word that Adama has hired a car. They track her down, but Adama escapes. Shaw is revealed to now be in possession of Farah's mobile phone. Flashbacks Nine days before the fall, Hadley and Adama visit the Stoddards, Younes and Farah's neighbours. Mrs Stoddard accuses Younes of having keyed her car. The officers then visit Younes; only an old lady is in, and she speaks no English. Hadley persuades her to give them entry; Farah arrives, and Adama sees them talk from a distance. Younes arrives, but flees.
2	2	"Episode 2"	Jim Loach	Patrick Harbinson	9 November 2021	4.54
A public appeal is put out for Adama. Collins visits Farah's school teacher who disputes the portrayal of Farah being unhinged and tells Collins that Farah spent two years in a refugee camp. Meanwhile, Younes claims Hadley made racist remarks to Farah; Collins discovers that in separate statements Adama both ignored Younes' allegation and then denied it. Farah tells Adama that her phone recorded Hadley's comments, so Hadley confiscated it. DCI Baillie, Shaw's superior officer, following an argument with Collins, eventually authorises her request for a search warrant for Shaw's house. Flashbacks Seven days before the fall, Adama tells Hadley about Younes' allegations, which he denies, asking her to say nothing. She tells Shaw that she was not with Hadley at the time. Four days later, Adama discovers a woman in a house who has been badly beaten by the gangster. He is still there, and, threatening them with a gun, steals Adama's bodycam. Hadley arrives and says he will section her if she refuses hospital; she dies there the next day. Adama persuades Younes to surrender himself at the station. This he does, and she arrests him.
3	3	"Episode 3"	Jim Loach	Patrick Harbinson	10 November 2021	4.20
Shaw reveals to Adama that, en route to Portland Tower, Hadley phoned him and asked that he retrieve Farah's mobile from Hadley's locker. Adama wants to go public; Shaw threatens her. Collins arrives at Shaw's house with her warrant. The returning Shaw spots them and hides the phone in a takeaway coffee. Later, another post mortem reveals each had the other's epidermis under their fingernails. Shaw's wife tells him she has destroyed Farah's mobile. Interviewed by Collins, Adama denies wrong had been done by any of them. Collins believes Hadley killed Farah, but Adama explains that she startled Farah into falling. Hadley tried to grab her but overbalanced. Bradshaw ends the interview. Eleven days later Adama identifies her gangster from an identity parade, while Collins gets asked to help out with Northumbria Police but opting to accept a job offer at Homicide Command instead. Collins attends Hadley's funeral; Adama does not. Mrs Shaw did not destroy Farah's undamaged phone, despite her earlier assertion. Flashbacks Farah and Hadley are on Portland Tower roof with Farah and the boy. Hadley joins Farah on the ledge and he and Adama persuade Farah to release the boy, which she does. Then they disappear over the edge together.

=== Series 2 – Death Message (2023) ===
No. overall	No. in series	Title	Directed by	Written by	Original release date	UK viewers (millions)
4	1	"Episode 1"	Faye Gilbert	Patrick Harbinson	16 May 2023	4.02
5	2	"Episode 2"	Faye Gilbert	Patrick Harbinson	23 May 2023	3.76
6	3	"Episode 3"	Faye Gilbert	Patrick Harbinson	30 May 2023	3.60
7	4	"Episode 4"	Faye Gilbert	Patrick Harbinson	6 June 2023	3.42

=== Series 3 – Gallowstree Lane (2024) ===
No. overall	No. in series	Title	Directed by	Written by	Original release date	UK viewers (millions)
8	1	"Episode 1"	Rene van Pannevis	Patrick Harbinson and Kate London	2 September 2024	N/A
9	2	"Episode 2"	Rene van Pannevis	Patrick Harbinson and Kate London	3 September 2024	N/A
10	3	"Episode 3"	Rene van Pannevis	Patrick Harbinson and Kate London	4 September 2024	N/A
11	4	"Episode 4"	Rene van Pannevis	Patrick Harbinson and Kate London	5 September 2024	N/A

== Reception ==
Although the original book was published many years before the murder of Sarah Everard by serving Met officer Wayne Couzens, the show's timing made the comparison obvious to some critics. For example, Paul Kendall in The Telegraph placed the show squarely in the context of contemporary police–public relations, particularly in the aftermath of the Couzens case. The Guardian's Lucy Mangan considered the show's release timely, as "trust in officers is at an all-time low". She was generally positive about the first episode, writing that "the plot builds at pace but without inducing vertigo in the viewer" and noting its background of "racial tensions, bigger crimes, personal secrets and political arse-covering". Writing in The Times, Carol Midgley identified an "aura of grim authenticity", which she put down to the original author's police background. Although she noticed a Line of Duty–style "what are all these coppers hiding?" trope, she considered the show to have successfully avoided the tendency to focus on the murder of females.

However, Midgely criticised the sound engineering. She complained that, at times, it was difficult to hear; "was it just my old ears or were the actors going for a mumbling level worthy of The Wire?" A similar criticism, of muffled—and also hurried—dialogue was made by Digital Spy, who argued that this was a common refrain from viewers on Twitter. Anita Singh of The Telegraph also criticised dialogue which sounded as if some cast members were "mumbling at their shoes". She summed up the series, effectively, as "everyone is lying about what happened and Collins is here to find out why", although she disagreed that the series was derivative of Line of Duty: while the DSI might appear to be another AC-12, she suggested The Tower had a greater sense of day-to-day realism than similar programmes. Also addressing comparisons with Line of Duty, Ed Cumming suggested that, unlike that show, with The Tower "there isn't much pure evil here, more opportunists and easy-life seekers". He also argued that, thanks to Loach's direction, The Tower was a tighter script—with less "flabbiness"—than many of its genre. However, he was overall critical, arguing that Whelan is the only character to consistently hold the viewers' interest and that, generally, the series could have "aimed a bit higher". The Guardian's Barbara Ellen was also less enthusiastic, picking out what she considered an overuse of flashbacks adding unnecessary confusion to an already complex plot, combined with the shoehorning in of too many themes. She was more positive of the dialogue and portrayals, summing up saying "bring back the characters, please, but with a less chaotic story".

== Future ==
In November, 2024, ITV confirmed that they would not be renewing the show, saying: "The Tower was much loved by the audience who watched the drama, but the viewing figures for the last series did not reach expectations, so sadly we won't be recommissioning."

== Kate London ==
Kate London was born in Staffordshire to a retired RAF sergeant and a nurse. A graduate of the University of Cambridge, she took up acting and played alongside Hugh Bonneville and Dominic Dromgoole. She travelled to Paris and attended the same clown school as Sacha Baron Cohen would later. She joined the Metropolitan Police Service (MPS) as a uniformed PC in 2006 and left in 2014 as a murder squad detective in a Homicide and Serious Crime Command dealing with major investigations before becoming a full-time author. She also writes regularly for newspapers. In response to comparisons between The Tower and the murder of Sarah Everard in March 2021, London argued that, in a close-knit institution such as the police, officers often do not speak out or criticise, through fear of becoming known as a troublemaker. London notes that, in the universe of The Tower, this is at the root of the police's problem, and by extension the public's:

In The Tower, people don't speak up, they don't say "No", and we know historically, in any place where bad things are happening, good people need to speak up, and when they don't, catastrophe ensues. The Tower is a story. Saying all police are like the police in The Tower is like saying all kings are like Lear. But there do need to be things in place to make it easier for people to speak out and do the right thing.

London lives and writes in Shropshire. Critic Joan Smith positively reviewed Post Mortem on its 2015 publication, arguing that London "vividly recreates the everyday experience of uniformed police, for the most part avoiding the temptation to take sides. The result is a complex novel that offers rare insights into how the police operate." London was nervous of ITV's proposal to televise Post Mortem as she had experienced two previous, unsuccessful attempts at turning her book into script.
