= Jimmy Akingbola =

British-Nigerian TV, theatre and film actor (born 1978)

James Olatokunbo Akingbola
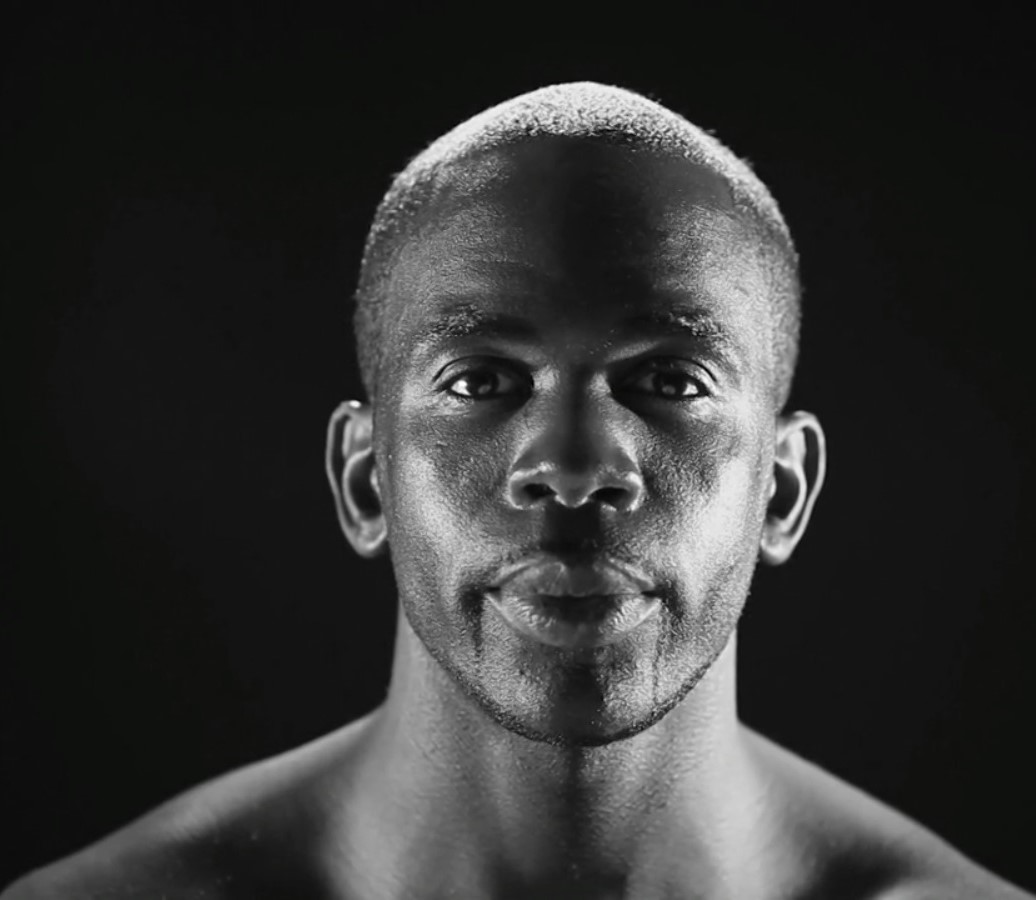
- Akingbola in Out of Darkness, 2012 short film by Manjinder Virk
- Born: 7 April 1978 (age 48); Plaistow, London, England
- Occupations: Television, theatre and film actor
- Years active: 1999–present
- Relatives: Fola Evans-Akingbola (niece)

James Olatokunbo Akingbola (born 7 April 1978) is a Nigerian-British television, theatre and film actor. He played PC Neil Parker in Holby Blue, and subsequently Antoine Malick in its parent series Holby City. He has subsequently appeared as Koji in the first series of the sitcom Kate & Koji, Mick in Rev., Valentine Easmon in In the Long Run, Geoffrey Thompson in Bel-Air and DC Steve Bradshaw in The Tower.

== Early life ==
Jimmy Akingbola was born in London to parents of the Yoruba tribe who had emigrated from Nigeria.

In 1996, Akingbola started at the Academy of Live and Recorded Arts (ALRA) in Wandsworth, London. He completed their three-year, full-time acting diploma.

== Theatre ==
Akingbola started his career on stage at the Birmingham Repertory Theatre in The Nativity for Bill Alexander. He continued in a production of Baby Doll at the Royal National Theatre. Next he appeared in Naked Justice by playwright John Mortimer at the West Yorkshire Playhouse, opposite Leslie Phillips.

Akingbola played Elvis in the poignant play Behzti at the Birmingham Rep in December 2004. He worked with rapper and actor Riz Ahmed in the hit play Prayer Room. Akingbola earned four-star reviews for his performance as Bunce.

Akingbola acted in the production of Roxanne Silbert's play People Next Door, in which he gave a memorable performance alongside actor Fraser Ayres' character as his best friend Marco.

Akingbola won his first award (TMA Theatre Award for Best Supporting Actor) for the role of Christopher in Blue/Orange, first produced at the Sheffield Crucible Theatre; the production then went on a national tour. He played opposite Roger Lloyd-Pack and Shaun Evans in Joe Penhall's award-winning play, which was directed by Kathy Burke.

Akingbola later went on to star in The Cut at the Donmar Warehouse opposite Ian McKellen, directed by Michael Grandage. Additional roles include Akingbola playing anti-hero Jimmy Porter in the John Osborne play of Look Back in Anger at the Jermyn Street Theatre in July 2008; he was the first black actor to play the role. The same year he played the title role of Othello for the company Frantic Assembly, which received a TMA Award.

== Television ==
Akingbola's television roles started with the black BBC sitcom The Crouches playing the witty character of Dennis Dutton. He has since played roles in Stupid!, The Bill, The Royal, The South Bank Show, Roger Roger, Holby City, Doctors, New Tricks, Comedy Lab, and Longford. Akingbola secured his first permanent major television role appearing in BBC's police drama series HolbyBlue, starring alongside Kacey Ainsworth and Tim Pigott-Smith, as PC Neil Parker alongside his on screen colleague PC Kelly Cooper, played by Chloe Howman. In 2009, he played Dean Collier in New Tricks ("Blood Is Thicker Than Water", S6:E7). Akingbola returned to show his comedy talent in 2010, starring in the BBC2 hit series Rev. where he played the popular character "Mick", alongside Tom Hollander and Olivia Colman. For his role as Mick, Akingbola was nominated for "Best TV Comedy Performance" at the Black International Film Festival and Music Video & Screen Awards. Akingbola also played the roles of Malick in Holby City and PC Johnson in Silk, both on BBC One in 2011.

In 2014, Akingbola played blind geography teacher Dr Dalton in episode 2 of the second series of BBC One sitcom Big School.

In 2015, Akingbola plays Baron Reiter in Arrow season 4.

In March 2020, Akingbola played Koji, an asylum seeker, in series 1 of the ITV sitcom Kate & Koji but was not available for the filming of series 2, so Okorie Chukwu took on the role. In the same year, he played Carter in Most Dangerous Game for Quibi. He will next reprise his role of Valentine in series 3 of In the Long Run with Idris Elba and will follow that with Ted Lasso for Apple TV+.

== Filmography ==
=== Film ===
List of film performances
| Year | Title | Role | Notes |
|---|---|---|---|
| 2002 | Anansi | Kojo | Film |
| 2005 | The Car | Jarelle | Short film |
| 2006 | Blackbeard: Terror at Sea | Black Caesar | TV film |
| 2010 | Walls | Joshua | Short film |
| 2010 | Habibti | Marlon | Short film |
| 2012 | The Smoke | Marcus Ademola | Short film |
| 2012 | Glimpse | —N/a | Short film. Producer |
| 2012 | Rage | Raymond | Short film |
| 2013 | Life's a Bitch | —N/a | Short film. Producer |
| 2013 | Out of Darkness | Male | Short film |
| 2013 | Ambition to Live | —N/a | Short film. Producer |
| 2013 | Mr. Invisible | Police Officer #2 | Short film |
| 2014 | Blood Cells | Debo | Film |
| 2015 | Roald Dahl's Esio Trot | Keen Pet Shop Keeper | TV film |
| 2016 | Spectral | Sgt. Steve McFadden | Film |
| 2017 | Abe | Matthew | Short film |
| 2017 | The Machine | Dr. Lubin | TV film |
| 2018 | Hero | Kwame Nkrumah | Film |
| 2018 | Full-Dress | Bertie | Film |
| 2022 | Rise | Kachalla | Film |
| 2022 | Rogue Agent | Andrew | Film |

=== Television ===
List of television performances
| Year | Title | Role | Notes |
|---|---|---|---|
| 2003 | Roger Roger | Dion | Season 3, episode 3: "Freedom's Just Another Word for Nothing Left to Lose" |
| 2003 | Doctors | Luke Kabila | Season 5, episode 37: "Send in the Clones" |
| 2003–2005 | The Crouches | Dennis Dutton / Dennis Ubakema | 9 episodes |
| 2004, 2006 | Stupid! | Various characters | 11 episodes |
| 2006 | The Royal | Corporal Frederick Collins | Season 5, episode 4: "Seeking Refuge" |
| 2006 | The Bill | Paul Gilbert | Season 22, episode 17: "Experience and Education" |
| 2006 | Doctors | Jerome Noble | Season 8, episode 61: "In the Driving Seat" |
| 2006 | Holby City | Guy Heron | Season 8, episode 44: "Bad Blood" |
| 2007 | Gina's Laughing Gear | | Season 1, episode 3: "Driving Me Mad" |
| 2007–2008 | HolbyBlue | PC Neil Parker | 20 episodes |
| 2007–2015 | The Wright Stuff | Himself – Guest Panellist | 8 episodes |
| 2008 | The City Speaks | Leon | Mini-series, episode 3: "Broken Chain" |
| 2009 | New Tricks | Dean Collier | Season 6, episode 7: "Blood Is Thicker Than Water" |
| 2009 | The Bill | David Clayton | Season 25, episode 60: "Show of Force" |
| 2010 | Doctors | Adam Bede | Season 12, 5 episodes: "Carousel: Parts 1—5" |
| 2010 | Holby City | Guy Heron | Season 12, episode 48: "'Til the Grave" |
| 2010–2014 | Rev. | Mick | 10 episodes |
| 2011 | Silk | PC Johnson | Season 1, episode 4: "Touch and Go" |
| 2011 | Twenty Twelve | Receptionist | Season 1, episode 3: "Roman Remains" |
| 2011 | Planet of the Apemen: Battle for Earth | Morda | Season 1, 2 episodes: "Homo Erectus" and "Neanderthal" |
| 2011–2013, 2016 | Holby City | Antoine Malick | Regular until 2013, guest in 2016 |
| 2013 | The Key | Himself | Documentary |
| 2014 | Death in Paradise | Terrance Jackson | Season 3, episode 7: "The Man with the Golden Gun" |
| 2014 | Big School | Dr. Dalton | Season 2, episode 2 |
| 2015 | Very British Problems | Himself | 3 episodes |
| 2015 | Sons of Liberty | Peter Salem | Mini-series, episode 2: "The Uprising" |
| 2015 | Ballot Monkeys | Baz Adebalu | 5 episodes |
| 2015 | Fungus the Bogeyman | Reverend Jake Ruto | Mini-series, 3 episodes |
| 2015–2016 | Arrow | Baron Reiter | 16 episodes |
| 2016–present | Sorry, I Didn't Know | Himself – Host | 20 episodes |
| 2017 | NCIS | Liberian Ambassador Gabriel Moore | Season 14, episode 22: "Beastmaster" |
| 2017 | Living the Dream | Paul | 5 episodes |
| 2018 | Scorpion | Jelani | Season 4, episode 22: "A Lie in the Sand" |
| 2018 | MacGyver | Joseph | Season 3, episode 7: "Scavengers + Hard Drive + Dragonfly" |
| 2018–2020 | In the Long Run | Valentine | 19 episodes |
| 2019 | Cheat | DI Hammond | 4 episodes |
| 2020 | Kate & Koji | Koji | Season 1, 6 episodes |
| 2020 | Most Dangerous Game | Carter | 4 episodes |
| 2020 | Ted Lasso | Ollie | Season 1, 2 episodes: "Pilot" and "Trent Crimm: The Independent" |
| 2021–2023 | The Tower | DC Steve Bradshaw | 8 episodes |
| 2022 | Jimmy Akingbola: Handle with Care | Himself | TV Special |
| 2022–present | Bel-Air | Geoffrey Thompson | 20 episodes |
| 2024 | Bob Hearts Abishola | Ade | Season 5, episode 11: "These Giants Are Flexible" |

=== Stage ===
| Year | Title | Role | Venue | Notes |
|---|---|---|---|---|
| 1999 | Ready or Not Raw | Mr. MV / Customs Officer | Theatre Royal Stratford East, Stratford, London | |
| 1999 | Nativity | Chief of the Guard | Birmingham Repertory Theatre, Birmingham | |
| 2000 | Baby Doll | Norm | Royal National Theatre, South Bank, London & Albery Theatre, West End, London | |
| 2000 | Ramayana | Mahaparashwa | Birmingham Repertory Theatre, Birmingham | |
| 2001 | Ramayana | Mahaparashwa | Royal National Theatre, South Bank, London | |
| 2001 | Naked Justice | Byron Williams | West Yorkshire Playhouse, Leeds & UK Tour | |
| 2002 | Playing Fields | Pete | Soho Theatre, Soho, London | |
| 2003 | Thumbelina | Hans Christian Andersen | Stephen Joseph Theatre, Scarborough, North Yorkshire | |
| 2003 | The People Next Door | Marco | Traverse Theatre, Edinburgh & Theatre Royal Stratford East, Stratford, London | |
| 2004 | Behzti | Elvis | Birmingham Repertory Theatre, Birmingham | |
| 2004 | The Shooky | Onga | Birmingham Repertory Theatre, Birmingham | in partnership with Birmingham schools |
| 2005 | Blue/Orange | Christopher | Crucible Theatre, Sheffield & UK Tour | Winner of Best Supporting Actor, TMA Awards 2005 |
| 2005 | Prayer Room | Bunce | Royal Lyceum Theatre, Edinburgh | |
| 2005 | After the End | Mark | Traverse Theatre, Edinburgh & Bush Theatre, Shepherd's Bush, London | Paines Plough Production |
| 2006 | The Cut | John | Donmar Warehouse, Covent Garden, London | |
| 2006 | Henry VIII | Duke of Surrey | Church of the Holy Trinity, Stratford-upon-Avon | |
| 2006 | White Open Spaces | Courage | Soho Theatre, Soho, London | |
| 2007 | The Christ of Coldharbour Lane | Omotunde | Soho Theatre, Soho, London | |
| 2008 | Look Back in Anger | Jimmy Porter | Jermyn Street Theatre, London | |
| 2008 | Othello | Othello | Lyric Theatre, Hammersmith, London | |
| 2009 | Everything Must Go! | Various roles | Soho Theatre, Soho, London | |
| 2009 | Category B | Saul | Tricycle Theatre, Kilburn, London | |
| 2009 | Detaining Justice | Alfred | Tricycle Theatre, Kilburn, London | |
| 2013 | The Island | Winston | Young Vic, The Cut, London | |
| 2016 | Father Comes Home from the Wars – Parts 1, 2 & 3 | Homer | Jerwood Theatre, Sloane Square, London | |

== Audio/radio ==
Akingbola is the voice in several popular computer games for electronics game brands including EA, Disney, PlayStation and Funcom. Game titles include; Dead Space 2, Pirates of the Caribbean, Gangs of London, Age of Conan, The Secret World, Dirt 2, James Bond: Golden Eye, Brink and Dirty Bomb.

Akingbola works with BBC Radio as a regular voice over contributor to several shows including BBC World Service, BBC Radio 4 and 7.

== Awards and nominations ==
| Year | Award | Category | Work | Result | Ref. |
|---|---|---|---|---|---|
| 2005 | TMA Awards | Best Supporting Actor | Blue/Orange | Won | |
| 2008 | Screen Nation Film and Television Awards | Best Male Performance in TV | HolbyBlue | Nominated | |
| 2010 | BEFFTA Awards | Best TV Actor | Rev. | Won | |
| 2010 | BEFFTA Awards | Best Film Actor | Habibti | Won | |
| 2011 | Screen Nation Film and Television Awards | Best Male Performance in TV | Holby City | Nominated | |
| 2011 | Movie, Video & Screen Awards | Best TV Actor | Holby City | Won | |
| 2011 | BEFFTA Awards | Best TV Actor | Holby City | Won | |
| 2012 | Screen Nation Film and Television Awards | Favourite Male TV Star | Holby City | Nominated | |
| 2012 | Screen Nation Film and Television Awards | Best Male Performance in TV | Holby City | Nominated | |
| 2012 | Nigerian Entertainment & Lifestyle Awards | Best TV Actor | Holby City | Won | |
| 2012 | Movie, Video & Screen Awards | Best Comedy Performance in TV | Rev. | Won | |
| 2014 | Screen Nation Film and Television Awards | Favourite Male TV Star | Holby City | Won | |
| 2014 | Movie, Video & Screen Awards | Best Comedy Performance | Rev. | Won | |

== Nominations ==
- Best Male TV Actor, Screen Nation (BBC's "Holby Blue")
