= Harriet Webb =

English actress

- Born: 18 March 1986 (age 40); Lancashire
- Occupation: Actress
- Years active: 2014-present
- Television: Big Boys; Wreck; Mr. Bigstuff

Harriet Webb (born 1986) is an English film and television actress who often appears in comedic roles.

== Early life ==
Born in Lancashire in 1986, Webb grew up in Arkholme and was first minded towards acting after seeing her brother perform in a school play. She studied at Liverpool Institute for Performing Arts. After moving to London to pursue acting she also worked as a teacher and as a restaurant host.

== Career ==
She had a role in BBC One sitcom Scarborough in 2019 and had a role in BBC Two sitcom White Gold. She played Tina Taylor in David Walliams created 2020 seaside-set sitcom Sandylands. That year, she could be seen as Theodora in Michaela Coel television series I May Destroy You, and family drama The Split.

She has a recurring role in ITV police drama series The Tower which began in 2021. In 2022, she appeared in the murder-mystery film Medusa Deluxe. She was in the short film The Gospel According to Gail which won Best Film at the BFI Future Film Festival and ITV drama series Our House alongside Martin Compston, both in 2022.

She appears in all 3 series of Channel 4 sitcom Big Boys, with her character, Shannon, the cousin of the main character being given a bigger role on series two and three. From 2022, she has a recurring role as Karen in BBC 3 Cruise ship based comedy horror television series Wreck, returning for the second series in 2024.

In 2024, she could be seen as Kirsty, wife of Ryan Sampson's Glen in Sky Max comedy series Mr. Bigstuff alongside Danny Dyer. It was renewed for a second series in September 2024.

== Filmography ==
Year	Title	Role	Notes
2014	Obsession: Dark Desires	Collette	1 episode
2014	Edge of Heaven	Sunbed Tina	5 episodes
2014	Drifters	Mason	1 episode
2015	Benidorm	Tracey	1 episode
2017	The Windsors	Emma	1 episode
2017-2019	White Gold	Maureen	5 episodes
2018	Plebs	Steffi	1 episode
2019	Pure	Alison	1 episode
2019	Scarborough	Lisa Marie	6 episodes
2019	Defending the Guilty	Hetty	1 episode
2020	The Split	Ali	5 episodes
2020	I May Destroy You	Theodora	4 episodes
2020-2021	Sandylands	Tina Taylor	6 episodes
2021	This Way Up	Shelley	1 episode
2021-2024	The Tower	DCI Alice Parker	6 episodes
2021	The Gospel According to Gail	Gail	Short film
2022	Our House	Kirsty	3 episodes
2022	Medusa Deluxe	Kendra	Film
2022-2025	Big Boys	Cousin Shannon	16 episodes
2022–present	Wreck	Karen McIntyre	12 episodes
2024–present	Mr. Bigstuff	Kirsty	12 episodes
2026	Amandaland	Abs	
2026	Merry Christmas Aubrey Flint	Wendy Mallett	Film
