= Medusa Deluxe =

2022 film by Thomas Hardiman

- Theatrical release poster
- Directed by: Thomas Hardiman
- Written by: Thomas Hardiman
- Produced by: Michael Elliott; Lee Groombridge; Louise Palmkvist Hansen
- Starring: Anita-Joy Uwajeh; Clare Perkins; Darrell D'Silva; Debris Stevenson; Harriet Webb; Heider Ali; Kae Alexander; Kayla Meikle; Lilit Lesser; Luke Pasqualino; Nicholas Karimi
- Cinematography: Robbie Ryan
- Edited by: Fouad Gaber
- Music by: Koreless
- Production companies: BBC Film; BFI; EMU Films; Time Based Arts
- Distributed by: Mubi
- Release dates: 6 August 2022 (Locarno); 9 June 2023
- Running time: 101 minutes
- Country: United Kingdom
- Language: English

Medusa Deluxe is a 2022 British murder mystery film written and directed by Thomas Hardiman. It stars Clare Perkins, Anita-Joy Uwajeh, Kae Alexander, Harriet Webb, Darrell D'Silva, Luke Pasqualino and Heider Ali. The film is designed to look like one continuous take.

== Plot ==
A murder mystery set in a competitive hairdressing contest. Extravagance and excess collide, as the death of a contestant sows seeds of division in a community whose passion for hair verges on obsession.

During a competitive regional hairdressing contest, contestant Mosca is found dead backstage with his scalp cut off. As news of the murder spreads, the remaining contestants, models, and organizers are locked down. Competition rivals like Cleve (Clare Perkins), Kendra (Harriet Webb), Divine (Kayla Meikle), and organizer René (Darrell D'Silva), all suspect someone is trying to eliminate the competition. The investigation then uncovers affairs, rivalries, and a drug-dealing operation tied to Mosca’s partner, Angel (Luke Pasqualino), and a quiet security guard named Gac (Heider Ali). Eventually the truth becomes known. Gac was in love or obsessed with Mosca, then Mosca died of natural causes. Gac then found the body whilst high and took a cutting of Mosca's hair as a keepsake, only realising when sobered up that he had in fact scalped the head. The scalped corpse was then falsely thought to be a murder.

== Cast ==
- Clare Perkins as Cleve
- Anita-Joy Uwajeh as Timba
- Kayla Meikle as Divine
- Kae Alexander as Inez
- Harriet Webb as Kendra
- Darrell D'Silva as Rene
- Luke Pasqualino as Angel
- Heider Ali as Gac
- Lilit Lesser as Angie
- Nicholas Karimi as Patricio
- Debris Stevenson as Etsy
- John Alan Roberts as Mosca

== Release ==
The film premiered at the Locarno Festival on 6 August 2022. Prior to, Mubi and A24 acquired distribution rights in the United Kingdom, United States, and other territories. It was released in the United Kingdom on 9 June 2023, and was released in the United States on 11 August 2023.

== Reception ==
On the review aggregator website Rotten Tomatoes, 74% of 65 critics' reviews are positive, with an average rating of 6.3/10. The website's consensus reads: "A uniquely stylish whodunit, Medusa Deluxe positions debuting director/co-writer Thomas Hardiman as a talented filmmaker with exciting potential." Metacritic, which uses a weighted average, assigned the film a score of 60 out of 100, based on 17 critics, indicating "mixed or average" reviews.

Jonathan Romney of Screen Daily called the film a "flamboyant sign-off to a picture that’s about as far you can get from the short-back-and-sides tradition of British realism", and wrote that the "electric performances, from a super-alert, bristling cast", give a "feel of live event to the action, framed in Academy ratio." Jojo Ajisafe of Little White Lies called the film a "fun and extravagant murder mystery that shines a light on the beauty of hairdressing whilst leaving audiences guessing in this quick-witted whodunit."

The New York Times' Jeannette Catsoulis chose the film as one of its "Critic's Picks", hailing an "invigoratingly bold debut" [...] " displaying a flamboyant finesse and a cheeky, can’t-sit-still sensibility". French newspaper Le Monde also praised the film as a "virtuoso debut".

Matthew Joseph Jenner of the International Cinephile Society rated the film 4.5 stars out of 5 and called the film a "masterpiece of carefully controlled chaos and "one of the more impressive directorial debuts of recent years." Marisa Mirabal of IndieWire graded the film a "B-" and called it a "flamboyant and alluring film that leaves audiences guessing until the very end about not only who committed the heinous crime but how exactly Hardiman was able to pull off such a visually delightful feature debut."

Guy Lodge of Variety praised the cinematography and the editing, but wrote that the "kinetic if not-quite-novel presentation doesn’t entirely patch over the weaknesses of Hardiman’s script, with its exhausting whirl of characters more colorful than they are shaded, and plotting that eventually runs out of compelling diversions from the matter at hand."
