= Sandy Johnson (director) =

British television director

Sandy Johnson is a Scottish director who has directed episodes of The Comic Strip Presents, Inspector Morse, A Touch of Frost, The Ruth Rendell Mysteries, Jonathan Creek and Auf Wiedersehen, Pet.

== Early life and education ==
Johnson's father Alfred managed a hotel near Loch Lomond which was frequented by celebrities and film stars touring the UK. Betty Hutton stayed there when appearing at the Glasgow Empire in 1952, also the likes of Laurence Olivier and Vivien Leigh, Glynis Johns, Richard Todd (whose Irish Wolfhounds were bigger than him), Jack Train, Kenneth Wolstenholme, Ralph Reader and Terence Rattigan.

In 1955 Johnson (aged 2) was introduced to Tyrone Power who was visiting Glasgow to present Ruchill Hospital with equipment funded by the Roosevelt Memorial (Polio) Fund.

== Career ==
His first full-length film was Coast to Coast (1987) written by Stan Hey and starring John Shea, Lenny Henry and Pete Postlethwaite. In Scotland he directed Leaving (1988), The Gift (1989) and The Wreck on the Highway (1990) starring Lynn Anderson.

In 1989 Johnson directed Defrosting The Fridge, written by Ray Connolly and starring Joe Don Baker.

In the 1990s he directed Gone to the Dogs, Gone to Seed and Roughnecks. In Australia he directed Supernova starring Rob Brydon. He directed the final two episodes of the first series of Kingdom and a 2007 episode of The Last Detective.

In 2001 he directed Adrian Mole: The Cappuccino Years starring Stephen Mangan and Alison Steadman, written by Sue Townsend.

In 2008 he directed Love Soup, written by David Renwick and starring Tamsin Greig, and Series 2–7 of Benidorm (29 episodes from 2008 to 2015) written by Derren Litten.

In 1998 he won a BAFTA for Best Drama Series for Jonathan Creek, and in both 2009 and 2011 won BAFTAs for Harry & Paul.

While studying drawing and painting at Glasgow School of Art in the 1970s, he was also an actor. He played several roles with Strathclyde Theatre Group and on film including one of the Knights of Ni in Monty Python and the Holy Grail.

In 2013 he directed Big Bad World for Comedy Central starring Blake Harrison, Rebecca Humphries, Seann Walsh and David Fynn and The Spa written by Derren Litten, starring Rebecca Front.

In 2015 he directed the 8-part series Cradle to Grave written by Danny Baker and Jeff Pope, starring Peter Kay, Lucy Speed and Laurie Kynaston.
