= The Spa (TV series) =

British sitcom (Sky Living, 2013)

- Genre: Sitcom
- Created by: Derren Litten
- Written by: Derren Litten
- Directed by: Sandy Johnson
- Starring: Rebecca Front; Derren Litten; Tim Healy; Debbie Chazen; Nadine Marshall; Niky Wardley; Vilma Hollingbery; Chris Geere; Ramin Karimloo; Cheryl Fergison; Frances Barber
- Composer: Howard Goodall
- Country of origin: United Kingdom
- Original language: English
- No. of series: 1
- No. of episodes: 8

Production
- Running time: 30mins (inc. adverts)
- Production company: Tiger Aspect Productions

Original release
- Network: Sky Living
- Release: 7 February – 27 December 2013

The Spa is a sitcom created, written and starring Derren Litten broadcast by Sky Living. It is set in a health spa in Hertfordshire and follows the daily goings-on of the business. The first series consisted of seven episodes and aired between February and March 2013. A New Year Special concluded the series on 27 December 2013.

== Background ==
The Spa follows the daily running of a health club where a run in with the staff can be deadly. The spa is run by bossy manageress Alison Crabbe, who is confident she can turn the spa into a successful business, despite a series of unfortunate accidents and terrible customer service. Alison is joined by an eccentric and inept group of employees who find themselves in strange and bizarre situations as a matter of routine.

== Characters ==
- Rebecca Front as Alison
- Derren Litten as Marcus
- Tim Healy as Eric
- Debbie Chazen as Davina
- Niky Wardley as Sally
- Nadine Marshall as Vron
- Vilma Hollingbery as Rose
- Chris Geere as Bolek
- Ramin Karimloo as Costas
- Cheryl Fergison as Bergita Wylde
- Frances Barber as Ginny

== Episodes ==
| No. | Title | Directed by | Written by | Original release date | UK viewers (millions) |
|---|---|---|---|---|---|
| 1 | "High Anxiety" | Sandy Johnson | Derren Litten | 7 February 2013 | 532,000 |
It's a typically abnormal day at The Spa as Rose goes to great heights to get noticed and Sally suffers the consequences of upsetting fussy regular Ms Begita Wylde.
| 2 | "No Place Like Home" | Sandy Johnson | Derren Litten | 14 February 2013 | 378,000 |
Alison secretly moves into the health centre when her boiler at home breaks down, but it's far from a relaxing stay.
| 3 | "A Rose Is A Rose Is A Rose" | Sandy Johnson | Derren Litten | 21 February 2013 | 320,000 |
Marcus suspects his boss is to blame for his injury and although Alison has tried to put him off the scent, he's on the hunt for evidence.
| 4 | "Love Is A Losing Game" | Sandy Johnson | Derren Litten | 28 February 2013 | 318,000 |
Peter Kelly, a swindler from Alison's past, uses his smooth-yet-slimy talking gets the manageress on board with his latest scheme to break into the PR world.
| 5 | "Wedding Belles" | Sandy Johnson | Derren Litten | 7 March 2013 | 241,000 |
Both wedding and alarm bells sound as manageress Alison gets her registrar licence.
| 6 | "Mr Right" | Sandy Johnson | Derren Litten | 14 March 2013 | 255,000 |
Davina confides in Vron about her crush on Marcus, only to receive some surprising information in return. Meanwhile Alison is looking for love.
| 7 | "Guilty Until Proven Innocent" | Sandy Johnson | Derren Litten | 21 March 2013 | 225,000 |
The first series of the comedy concludes with Marcus and Alison's long-awaited showdown. Chesney Hawkes guest stars.
| 8 | "Strangers In The Night" | Sandy Johnson | Derren Litten | 27 December 2013 | > 121,000 |
Its New Year's Eve and staff are hoping to be dismissed early. There's no such luck, unfortunately, due to a freak snow storm.

== DVD release ==
The complete first seven episodes of the series was released onto DVD on 25 March 2013.
