= Scarborough (TV series) =

British television series

- Genre: Sitcom
- Created by: Derren Litten
- Written by: Derren Litten
- Directed by: Derren Litten
- Starring: Stephanie Cole; Catherine Tyldesley; Jason Manford; Rebekah Hinds; Steve Edge; Maggie Ollerenshaw; Harriet Webb; Gina Fillingham; Derren Litten; Claire Sweeney; Jake Canuso
- Opening theme: Rotterdam (Or Anywhere)
- Country of origin: United Kingdom
- Original language: English
- No. of series: 1
- No. of episodes: 6

Production
- Producer: Gill Isles
- Production locations: Scarborough; Greater Manchester
- Editor: Adam Windmill
- Camera setup: Single-camera
- Running time: 28 minutes
- Production company: BBC Studios

Original release
- Network: BBC One
- Release: 6 September – 11 October 2019

Scarborough is a British television sitcom set in the North Yorkshire seaside town of Scarborough, England. The series was aired on BBC One, and revolves around the lives of a group of friends who regularly meet up in a pub for karaoke on a Friday night.

The series was written and directed by Derren Litten, who wrote the award-winning ITV series, Benidorm. In November 2019, Litten announced that the series had not been recommissioned for a second series.

== Synopsis ==
Mike and Karen are in their late 30s and are giving their romance another go after a break of five years. Mike always wanted to be an entertainer, a career that kept him away from home which led to the demise of their relationship. Mike, Karen, their friends and colleagues, meet up on Friday nights to drink in the local pub and perform karaoke.

== Cast ==
- Stephanie Cole as Marion Norris
- Catherine Tyldesley as Karen Norris
- Jason Manford as Mike
- Rebekah Hinds as Yolanda
- Steve Edge as Barry "Bigsy" Dixon
- Jake Canuso as Tony Peroni
- Maggie Ollerenshaw as Geraldine Payne
- Harriet Webb as Lisa Marie
- Gina Fillingham as Mandy
- Derren Litten as Jack
- Claire Sweeney as Hayley Cox
- Steff Todd as Jess
- Rebecca Scroggs as WPC Treeves
- Olisa Odele as PC Merrick
- Kenneth Cranham as Mr Ferris

== Production ==
The show was announced by the BBC in August 2018. Filming started in the town of Scarborough in April 2019, with final scenes being filmed just over six weeks later at the end of May of the same year. Scenes have been filmed in Luna Park, Peasholm Park and the pub The Newcastle Packet is shown in the series as being called The Good Ship where the characters meet up on Friday nights. Internal scenes at the pub were filmed in Sholver, Oldham. The hairdressing salon (Geraldine's), had its scenes filmed in Stockport, Greater Manchester, with most of the interior shots being filmed in studios in Manchester.

== Episodes ==
No. in series	Title	Written and directed by	Original release date	UK viewers (millions)
1	"The Unfavourable Death of Mrs Bookham"	Derren Litten	6 September 2019	4.83
Karen sees Mike kissing a woman behind his crab stall on the Scarborough sea front. A week after not taking his calls, Karen sees Mike at their routine Friday night karaoke session in the pub where he finally has a chance to explain himself. Meanwhile, at Geraldines' Hair salon, one of the regular customers has gone missing and the police are called in.
2	"The Paradoxical Burglary of Mr Ferris"	Derren Litten	13 September 2019	N/A (<4.09) (Note: Not reported in the weekly top 15 programmes for four-screen viewer ratings.)
Mike and Karen try to get their relationship back on track after Mike's crab stall misdemeanour, while Mike finally finds Bigsy sleeping rough at the castle after he goes AWOL. The police visit Marion about the break-in next door and Geraldine is under suspicion over the mystery of what happened to the contents of Mrs Bookham's handbag.
3	"The Sudden Apprehension of Barry Dixon"	Derren Litten	20 September 2019	N/A (<3.78)
It's not a good day for Geraldine at the salon, as not only is it Mrs Bookham's funeral, but after a blazing row Lisa Marie storms out, telling Geraldine she can stick her job.
4	"The Untimely Faux Pas of Marion Norris"	Derren Litten	27 September 2019	N/A (<4.27)
Mike and Karen decide to move in together and go flat-hunting. Meanwhile, Geraldine finally admits the strain of the salon's financial difficulties.
5	"The Continuing Misfortune of Geraldine Payne"	Derren Litten	4 October 2019	N/A (<4.25)
Karen and Geraldine are perplexed by who might have told the police about Mrs Bookham's missing money.
6	"The Ballad of Karen and Mike"	Derren Litten	11 October 2019	N/A (<4.63)
At Geraldine's salon tensions run high when Tony and Hayley drop in to talk through their plans for the renovation.

== Critical reception ==
The i and The Daily Mirror were not impressed with the opening episode; Sara Wallis wrote "This soap opera-style comedy was not my cup of Yorkshire. But let’s hope it warms up." Emily Baker, writing in The i, said "BBC One’s new comedy Scarborough is missing one key element – humour", continuing with "Scarborough’s complete lack of laughs is more frustrating than upsetting."

Michael Hogan, writing in The Daily Telegraph, was more positive about the start of the sitcom stating that whilst it was "not an unqualified success", but that it was "...a promising start." Of particular note for Hogan was Claire Sweeney as Hayley; "[Sweeney] hammed it up Dynasty-style as the local man-eater, all hairspray, leopardskin and cat-clawed one-liners (“I might be a slag and a home-wrecker but I’m very good at both”)." Likewise, in The Guardian, Graeme Virtue was in admiration of Sweeney's on-screen character, saying "...Sweeney brings some powerful energy as the local man-eater."
