= The House of Eliott =

British television series

- Series title card
- Genre: Costume drama
- Created by: Jean Marsh; Eileen Atkins
- Starring: Stella Gonet; Louise Lombard; Aden Gillett; Maggie Ollerenshaw
- Theme music composer: Jim Parker
- Country of origin: United Kingdom
- Original language: English
- No. of series: 3
- No. of episodes: 34

Production
- Camera setup: Multiple
- Running time: 50 minutes (approx)

Original release
- Network: BBC 1
- Release: 31 August 1991 – 6 March 1994

The House of Eliott is a British television series produced and broadcast by the BBC in three series between 31 August 1991 and 6 March 1994. The series starred Stella Gonet as Beatrice Eliott and Louise Lombard as Evangeline Eliott, two sisters in 1920s London who establish a dressmaking business and eventually their own haute couture fashion house. It also featured Aden Gillett as photographer and film maker Jack Maddox, who eventually marries Bea and Maggie Ollerenshaw as head of the workroom Florence Ranby.

It was created by Jean Marsh and Eileen Atkins, who had previously devised Upstairs, Downstairs. The series was written by several writers, including Jill Hyem, Peter Buckman, Deborah Cook and Ginnie Hole.

== Plot ==
=== Series One ===
Beatrice (30, known as Bea) and Evangeline (18, known as Evie) Eliott are left orphans by the sudden death of their tyrannical father, Henry Eliott. Left almost destitute and without any education, the sisters are forced to sell the family home to cover their father's debts. To earn money, they make use of their passion for dressmaking and Bea gets a job as secretary at a local photography studio run by Jack Maddox. Jack and his sister Penelope become firm friends of the sisters and Jack provides them with the funds to open their own London based dressmaking business "The House of Eliott".

Through their relationship with Penelope Maddox, the sisters meet the loyal and hardworking seamstress Tilly Watkins whom they employ. A consistent theme throughout the series is the struggle of women in the 1920s to live fulfilling and independent lives for some the struggle is simply to survive. Not only does Henry Eliott leave his daughters penniless and uneducated, but their cousin Arthur, who is executor of their father's estate, and Evie's legal guardian, keeps a rightful inheritance from the girls "for their own good".

After Arthur's arrest and imprisonment for involvement in drug smuggling, he emigrates to Boston, USA, releasing a large amount of cash owed to the sisters from their father's estate. This allows Beatrice and Evie to expand the business and, by the end of series one, with the help of Evie's godfather, successful businessman Sir Desmond Gillispie, the future looks good. Evie celebrates her twenty-first birthday and is made a partner in the firm. The House of Eliott releases its first independent fashion collection and is creating exclusive designs for the aristocracy.

=== Series Two ===
Spring 1924: the Eliott sisters have employed Florence Ranby, a dour Victorian, as head of the workroom. Beatrice and Evie are invited to Paris by fashion designer Gilles Caragnac, who offers them a 5-year contract as designers for his label. While there, Bea marries her former employer and friend Jack Maddox, and they move back to London, leaving Evie alone in Paris to work at the fashion house "Maison Gilles". After a year and an affair with Gilles Caragnac, a newly-glamorous and grown-up Evie returns as a designer for House of Eliott. Jack's movie director career is on the rise. At a showing of one of Jack's films, Evie meets Lord Alexander Montford, a married member of Parliament, with whom she begins an affair, causing complications throughout the series.

Jack and Beatrice separate, unable to agree about having children and the pressure of work. The House of Eliott faces ruin after the suspicious death of Sir Desmond Gillispie causes the firm's financial affairs to be taken over by Ralph Saroyan. The sisters suspect Saroyan of dishonesty and through their contact with Sir Alexander Montford, cause the bank to be officially investigated. It is discovered that Saroyan is defrauding most of the customers of the bank and the Eliott sisters are left with very little of their original savings and investments.

Jack's movie The Strikers is successful and a Hollywood producer offers him work in the U.S., but he turns it down to instead work in Berlin. Meanwhile, as the market for couture gowns wanes during the late 1920s Great Depression, Beatrice and Evangeline are offered a tour of America showing their new ready-to-wear designs for Sears and Roebuck. Bea still has feelings for Jack. Back at the fashion house, after a crisis of confidence, Tilly marries Norman Foss, a young chef in a local hotel, and is reinstated as head of the workroom. She announces her pregnancy in the last episode of the series.

Friction exists between Florence Ranby and Tilly. An annoyed Florence walks out of the Eliott workroom and narrowly misses being hit by a car. Tilly has many quarrels with Florence due to her short, sharp manner. Eventually, after Evie allows them to fix a fur collar in Madge's way rather than Florence's, Florence resigns and walks out; this time she is fatally struck by a car. At the funeral Mr Ranby, Florence's husband, confronts Madge and Tilly after their apology to him. He then confronts Bea and Evie over Florence's death and how she was treated. He particularly blames Bea and Evie for failing to notice the ongoing conflict and says Florence was loyal and would not hear a word said against them. Later, however, he returns, apologising for his outburst and gives flowers to Madge and Tilly. He mentions he is a tailor. Needing an expert cutter, Bea and Evie consider offering him a job; but they decide against it, concerned that the House's connection to Florence's death would be too difficult for him. They instead hire Charles Quance.

=== Series Three ===
The Eliott sisters and employee Madge are wrapping up their evidently successful visit to the United States under the sponsorship of Sears and Roebuck, which wants to carry a line of ready-to-wear designed by the House of Eliott. Still estranged from Jack, Bea has a new beau, debonair Sears executive Donald Bradley, who follows the ladies to England. Bea decides that she still loves Jack and settles down with him just as he is shifting from film direction to investigative journalism. Through Grace Keeble, a talented but unreliable new designer, Evie meets artists Miles Bannister and Daniel Page. Miles is hired to do illustrations for the House of Eliott and later becomes a much needed designer while Daniel is a talented artist who Evie believes only needs a break to be successful. Both men fall for Evie but Daniel wins out.

Meanwhile, Madge discovers a new love and it is not her rather gruff husband Jerry. Tilly and her husband Norman struggle to keep their marriage together following the loss of their baby son, William (played by Emily Ryan). By the season end, the House of Eliott has nearly fallen apart, Bea and Jack have a daughter, Lucy (also played by Emily Ryan), Jack wins a seat in the House of Commons, and Evie has married Daniel. Miles' father becomes an investor in the House of Eliott after realising his son is a talented fashion designer. He wants the House of Eliott to make Miles a partner and to move away from haute couture and into more profitable ready-to-wear fashions. The final episode ends with a heated confrontation that raises serious questions regarding the House of Eliott's future and the sisters' relationship.

The writers did not anticipate the programme being cancelled at the end of the third series. For this reason, the series ends without a firm conclusion to the storyline.

== Production ==
The House of Eliott is usually cited as the last major BBC drama series to have the majority of its interior sequences recorded at BBC Television Centre using the multi-camera production method. By the time the series came to an end in 1994, this video production method had been abandoned for drama series (other than soap operas) in favour of shooting using the single-camera setup, either on film, or on the increasingly lightweight video cameras that were becoming available.

Some scenes were shot at Clifton Hill House and Goldney Hall university halls of residence in Bristol; while many were filmed in Cheltenham, Gloucestershire. The exterior of the house is situated at 24 Berkeley Square, Bristol. Holes made by the 'House of Eliott' sign still remain on the wall to the left of the front door. Colston Hall was also used.

== Cast ==
Actor	Character	No. of episodes
Stella Gonet	Beatrice Eliott	34 (1991–94)
Louise Lombard	Evangeline Eliott	34 (1991–94)
Aden Gillett	Jack Maddox	34 (1991–94)
Cathy Murphy	Tilly Watkins/Foss	34 (1991–94)
Judy Flynn	Madge Howell/Althorpe	26 (1991–94)
Diana Rayworth	Betty	26 (1991–94)
Victoria Alcock	Agnes Clark	26 (1991–94)
Stephen Churchett	Joseph Wint	22 (1991–94)
Bill Thomas	Charles Quance	15 (1992–94)
Barbara Jefford	Lady Lydia Eliott	12 (1991)
Francesca Folan	Penelope Maddox	12 (1991)
Kate Fahy	Alice Burgoyne	11 (1992)
Toby Whithouse	Norman Foss	11 (1992–94)
David de Keyser	Sir Desmond Gillispie	9 (1991–92)
Robert Hands	Miles Bannister	9 (1994)
Richard Lintern	Daniel Page	8 (1994)
Rupert Frazer	Lord Alexander Montford	7 (1992)
Michael Culver	Ralph Saroyan	7 (1992)
Ian Redford	Larry Cotter	7 (1994)
Melanie Ramsay	Grace Keeble	7 (1994)
Caroline Trowbridge	Katya Beletsky	7 (1994)
Peter Birch	Arthur Eliott	6 (1991)
Jeremy Brudenell	Sebastian Pearce	6 (1991)
Maggie Ollerenshaw	Florence Ranby	6 (1992)
Elizabeth Garvie	Lady Elizabeth Montford	6 (1992)
Jamie Foreman	Gerry Althorpe	6 (1994)
Kelly Hunter	Daphne Haycock	5 (1991)
Kate Paul	Chalmers	5 (1991)
Robert Daws	Piggy Garstone	4 (1991)
Robert McIntosh	Tom Patterson	4 (1994)
Burt Kwouk	Peter Lo Ching	3 (1991)

Judy Campbell, Phyllis Calvert, James Cosmo, Eileen Davies, Minnie Driver, Amanda Mealing, Sheila Gish, Jessica Hynes and Phyllida Law, are among those who appeared in one or two episodes.

== Home media ==
All three series of The House of Eliott are available on DVD for regions 1, 2 and 4 DVD and distributed by Acorn Media UK. They were released in 2004, 2006 and 2007 respectively.

== Books ==
- The House of Eliott (1993) by Jean Marsh
- The House of Eliott: A House at War (1995) by Elizabeth O'Leary (authorised)
- The House of Eliott: The Anxious Years (2003) by Edward P. Rich (fan fiction)

== Repeats ==
A series of repeats began with the first episode on 5 September 2011 on ITV3. Previously (around 2005) there were repeats of the whole series on Sky and Cable channel UK Gold. It was repeated from April 2018 on the Drama Channel and from April 2024 on U&Drama.

== Spoof ==
The show was parodied by comedy duo Dawn French and Jennifer Saunders in a series of sketches called ‘The House of Idiot’. Stella Gonet, Louise Lombard and Cathy Murphy actually appear, in character, during the final sketch and comically reprimand the pair for mocking the show.
