= Perfect World (TV series) =

- Genre: Sitcom
- Created by: Mark Grant
- Written by: Mark Grant; Mark Chapman
- Starring: Paul Kaye; Nina Wadia; Michael Cochrane; Derren Litten
- Composer: Jonathan Whitehead
- Country of origin: United Kingdom
- Original language: English
- No. of series: 2
- No. of episodes: 13

Production
- Executive producers: Danielle Lux; Charles Brand
- Running time: 30 minutes
- Production company: Tiger Aspect Productions

Original release
- Network: BBC Two
- Release: 25 February 2000 – 25 June 2001

Perfect World is a British sitcom that was first shown on BBC Two in the UK from 25 February 2000 to 25 June 2001. The series starred Paul Kaye as Bob Slay, an obnoxious, lazy and amoral phony marketing executive for a leading toiletries company. Yet Bob has a swish office and an attractive girlfriend, and is well regarded by his manager.

The television series was written by Mark Grant (who would later go on to write Star) and Mark Chapman who was a co-writer for the second series and provided additional material for the first series. Mark Chapman also directed the first series and produced both series with Nick Wood directing the second. The show's other producer was Lucy Robinson (who produced the first Dennis Pennis instalment and played the mayoress in The Thin Blue Line) and it had executive producers Danielle Lux (All About Me) and Charles Brand (The Comic Strip Presents...). Perfect World was also broadcast in Australia on the Nine Network.

== Cast ==
- Paul Kaye as Bob Slay
- Derren Litten as Vaughan Rogers
- Nina Wadia as Margaret (Maggie) Stone
- Michael Cochrane as Terrence Bentley (marketing director)
- Tasha de Vasconcelos as Lauren
- Ekaterina Parfionova as Anna Molchanov
- Dariel Pertwee as Briony
- Hannah Storey as Julia

== Episodes ==
=== Series 1 (2000) ===
No. overall	No. in series	Title	Original release date
1	1	"Parents"	25 February 2000
Confirmed bachelor Bob is to meet girlfriend Lauren’s parents. He does his best to alienate them which pleases Lauren because to her disgust, every other boyfriend has sucked up to them because they are billionaires. Finding this out, Bob now tries to get back in their good graces while staying friends with Lauren.
2	2	"Deadline"	3 March 2000
Vaughan has done his share of an important project given to him and Bob a month ago. Bob has not started his share, deciding to leave it to the morning of the day it is due. However, the Marketing Director wants it that morning. Vaughan is mad with fear that he will be sacked with Bob.
3	3	"Tarquin"	10 March 2000
Bob badly insults a woman who unknown to him is from Head Office and is to judge the staff at Gatehouse on their performance. He invents a twin brother, Tarquin who he intends to blame it all on.
4	4	"Charity"	17 March 2000
Marketing and Accounts keep raising the stakes on who will raise the most money for Charity Week. After Bob volunteers Vaughan for a Channel swim, Spencer (Accounts) tops this with a raffle for a new car so Bob raffles a home in the country that he does not have.
5	5	"Money"	24 March 2000
Bob owes Vaughan £200. All his credit cards are maxed out, the bank won’t give him any more money and he has promised Lauren dinner at a very expensive place. Maggie is planning to leave.
6	6	"Love"	31 March 2000
Vaughan splits up with Briony and is very depressed. Bob tries to make him feel better by telling him that Maggie is in love with him, and Vaughan is on top of the world. Unfortunately Maggie has no interest in Vaughan at all, so Bob has to try to reunite him and Briony. Lauren leaves Bob.

=== Series 2 (2001) ===
No. overall	No. in series	Title	Original release date
7	1	"Revenge"	14 May 2001
Maggie tells a chatroom Romeo her secrets, but it turns out to be Bob. In revenge, she gets him drunk and makes it look like she has slept with him, then tells the whole office. Meanwhile, the Marketing Director decides to try out homosexuality and pursues Vaughan after Bob tells him that he is gay.
8	2	"Family Values"	21 May 2001
An important client has come from Russia with his attractive daughter whom Bob fancies, but Maggie says she and Bob are married and that she is expecting. This backfires on her when her family from Bombay come to visit and Bob gets his own back.
9	3	"Home"	28 May 2001
Bob lives with girlfriends and is homeless after being kicked out by his latest. He boasts that he has a large apartment by the river (Thames). The Marketing Director has been kicked out too so Maggie suggests that he stay with Bob. Bob has to steal Vaughan’s keys to use a large apartment he is looking after for a relative.
10	4	"Best Man"	4 June 2001
Vaughan is marrying his girlfriend Briony and has chosen someone else to be best man, something Bob intends to remedy.
11	5	"Fast Track"	11 June 2001
As the office workload increases, Maggie employs an attractive young assistant, whose potential is quickly exploited by Bob and the Marketing Director.
12	6	"Graduates"	18 June 2001
Bob reveals that he has padded out his CV with a Double First (qualifications) from Oxford University. As the Marketing Director wants to encourage more graduates to join Gatehouse, Maggie suggests that Bob gives a talk to them at his old university, to which the DM agrees.
13	7	"Mutiny"	25 June 2001
Bob returns three weeks late from a Hawaiian holiday to find Vaughan has taken over his job and that he is now a junior. Vaughan who has taken an assertive course turns into a bit of a tyrant but Bob plans to bring him down to earth again and get sent to the upcoming Rio conference in his place.

== Video and DVD releases ==
Perfect World series one was released on VHS in 2000, and rated 18 probably due to Paul Kaye saying the word "fuck" in the episode 'Love'. The video has been discontinued but a Region 2 DVD box set containing both series one and two was due for release on 26 January 2009 by 2entertain, the joint venture by the BBC Worldwide and Woolworths Group. BBC Worldwide own 60% of 2entertain, while Woolworths Group own 40%. However, the release was affected by the collapse of Woolworths in the UK and legal arguments and challenges by the BBC Worldwide over the ownership of the rights over the recordings owned by 2entertain following the demise of Woolworths Group. The legal dispute centres on whether a licensing agreement between BBC Worldwide and 2entertain lapsed when Woolworths Group went into administration.

== Quotes and critical reception ==
Paul Kaye said in an interview regarding the series: "I've never really worked in an office but it was the way I imagined you'd keep sane - I mean an office is sort of like an extended playground, isn't it? So the guy does absolutely no work and the only way he can relieve the tedium is by behaving despicably and I think the whole office would actually be sad if he left because it would suddenly be all very mundane. I mean I'm sure that's the case in a lot of real offices - it's like on reality-TV shows, everyone quite likes the bad guy in the Big Brother house, really."

Tasche de Vasconcelos who plays Lauren in the first series said: "It's a great show, I'm just so proud to have been able to do it. It's brilliantly written". She later went on to describe Paul as "a wonderful actor and co-partner he was so professional".

This is a review of the first episode of series one: "The stylish opening to this new office-centered, six-part situation comedy introduces Bob Slay, the ultimate marketing man. Paul Kaye (well known as spoof interviewer Dennis Pennis), stars as a slick and selfish operator with a saccharine tongue who occasionally justifies his behaviour in asides to the camera. His only real area of vulnerability is his parentage - he was abandoned as a baby. That makes him particularly nervous when he has to meet his gorgeous girlfriend Lauren's parents for the first time. The plotting is quite convoluted in this distinctly adults-only opener, but it has its moments. The best of them involve the marketing director, played by Michael Cochrane as a sex-mad monster who steals all the best lines. Even he confesses to being a little over-eager with Lauren's mother, played by Jan Harvey."
