= Coast to Coast (1987 film) =

- Directed by: Sandy Johnson
- Written by: Stan Hey
- Starring: Lenny Henry; John Shea
- Music by: Motown
- Release date: 1987
- Country: United Kingdom
- Language: English

Coast to Coast is a 1987 comedy thriller starring Lenny Henry, John Shea, with support from Peter Vaughan, Pete Postlethwaite, Cherie Lunghi and Al Matthews. It was directed by Sandy Johnson from a script by Stan Hey. It featured a soundtrack of classic Motown tracks. It was originally screened as part of BBC2's Screen Two strand in January 1987. The film had its to-date only cinema screening at BFI Southbank, in December 2016 as part of the BFI's retrospective of Henry's career.

== Plot ==
White American soul fan John Carloff (John Shea) arrives in Liverpool on a tourist coach: he's there to answer a help ad placed by black Liverpudlian Ritchie Lee (Lenny Henry) regarding setting up a mobile soul disco. Both unemployed, they nonetheless both have something to offer: John has a five-foot-high stack of original soul singles, and Ritchie has disco equipment plus an old ice cream van which has been converted into what he describes as "the Popemobile with attitude."

Although the duo bond over the music and the sense of adventure, things start off badly after they are mistakenly booked for a geriatrics evening entertainment. Despite hoping that their next booking will be at a upper scale event, it turns out to be a wedding reception in a Kirkby pub. Ritchie predicts trouble but the pair turn up anyway. As Ritchie predicts, the reception degenerates into a huge punch-up, and as John and Richie make their getaway, the van breaks down.

Ritchie then introduces John to Kecks (Pete Postlethwaite) a British Rail buffet car attendant with high ambitions who sold the van to Ritchie. After a quick drink (and a "French Revolution"), Kecks tells them he will fix the car in the morning free of charge. He then offers them a bit of paid work moving some gear from his lock-up.

The following night Ritchie and John arrive outside Kecks's lock-up to find a strange noise coming from within. Kecks appears with a number of parcels that they load into the van and take to Kecks's flat. When they arrive, Kecks tells the lads to go on up to his flat while he locks up their van, but while they're not looking he sneakily hides a parcel in the freezer compartment.

When the parcels are safely in Kecks's flat he gives the lads £20. Ritchie and John then head for the nearest pub where the bartender informs them the £20 is counterfeit.

They hurry back to Kecks's flat and arrive just as he is leaving wearing a disguise. They force Kecks to tell them what's going on. He tells them that he has stolen some printing plates for £20 notes from a villain in London and is about to skip the country with a bundle of counterfeit notes. He's hidden the plates in the van and planned to ring the lads from abroad to ask if they would deliver them to a contact in Parkestone. However, the contact will not arrive till later in the week so the lads will have to sit on the plates for a few days.

After being offered £1000 for delivery and another £1000 on arrival, John and Ritchie reluctantly agree to the scheme; but deny Kecks a lift to the airport. On the way out, they pass a couple of guys on the stairs. John and Richie realize that these men had cockney accents, so they head off to Parkestone. The two men - the gangster Kecks is trying to swindle (Johnny Shannon) plus his enforcer and torturer The Chiropodist (Peter Vaughan) - continue up to Kecks, where they kill him.

As John and Ritchie have a few days to travel, they decide to zig-zag to their destination because they are worried about being pursued by the cockney gangsters and the police. On catching a news bulletin, they are startled to discover that the police are looking for two men in connection with Kecks' murder.

En route they stay at a small hotel, complete with racist landlord (Tim Barker) and a llama. Richie implies to the landlord's pretty daughter Susan (Cherie Lunghi) that he and John are musicians travelling with Earth, Wind & Fire. Although Richie is attracted to Susan, it is John's bed that Susan visits. John admits to Susan that he is actually an AWOL pilot with the United States Air Force.

After leaving the hotel, Richie offers a lift to an American soldier named Curtis (Al Matthews) whose car has broken down and who needs a lift to a US base. Mindful of his AWOL status, John becomes increasingly agitated, particularly when Curtis insists that he and Richie join him for a beer inside the base. Curtis then invites them to perform a DJ gig in the soldiers' canteen. Richie is very excited to perform there, but cannot understand John's reluctance. Richie performs alone: during the gig, he takes to the stage as singer with the TAC Wing R&B Allstars, singing "Knock on Wood". Revitalised by the music, John begins to relax. Curtis invites volunteers to perform with the Allstars and Richie persuades John to join him on stage where the two sing "Drift Away" to rapturous applause, and reconcile. One of the soldiers recognizes John.

John and Richie continue to Parkestone to discover that the two gangsters have arrived first and murdered the recipient. The gangsters threaten them with a sawn-off shotgun, but when Richie blunders into a nearby lever, they are plunged into a vat of grain and suffocate.

The police arrive: Richie realizes that they have come for John when he sees military personnel getting out of the police car. John gets into the car without fuss, asking Richie to look after his records. Richie then discovers the plates that Kecks hid.

The last scene occurs months later at the Military Detention Centre in Massachusetts, USA, where John has been detained. Having completed his sentence, he is astonished to find Richie is there. Richie is resplendent in white, and driving a very large American car. Astonished by the change in his friend's circumstances, John asks what has happened: Richie explains, enigmatically, that he was "left some money", and that they have a gig in Pasadena. John points out that Pasadena is 5000 miles away, so Richie replies that they had better get a move on. The car is seen driving away into the distance as the credits roll.

== Release ==
The film has a strong following, but contractual problems and the costs of licensing the soundtrack music have prevented it from being distributed on video or DVD.

Tracks in order (They appear in the Show)

- "Ain't That Peculiar" by Marvin Gaye
- "Heaven Must Have Sent You" by The Elgins
- "Money" by Barratt Strong
- "It Should Have Been Me" by Gladys Knight
- "It's the Same Old Song" by Four Tops
- "Just a Little Misunderstanding" by The Contours
- "Going to a Go-Go" by The Miracles
- "Danger Heartbreak Dead Ahead" by The Marvelettes
- "Nowhere to Run" by Martha & The Vandellas
- "(I'm a) Road Runner" by Junior Walker & the All Stars
- "Needle In A Haystack" by The Velvelettes
- "When I'm Gone" by Brenda Holloway
- "Reach Out I'll Be There" by The Four Tops
- "Headline News" by Edwin Starr
- "I've Passed This Way Before" by Jimmy Ruffin
- "This Old Heart Of Mine" by Isley Brothers
- "Knock On Wood" by Curtis Duchamp & the 48 TAC Wing R&B Allstars
- "Drift Away" by Shea, Henry & the 48 TAC Wing R&B Allstars
- "(I Know) I'm Losing You" by The Temptations
- "Can I Get A Witness" by Marvin Gaye
