= Tasha de Vasconcelos =

Mozambican-born Portuguese-Canadian model, actress and humanitarian ambassador

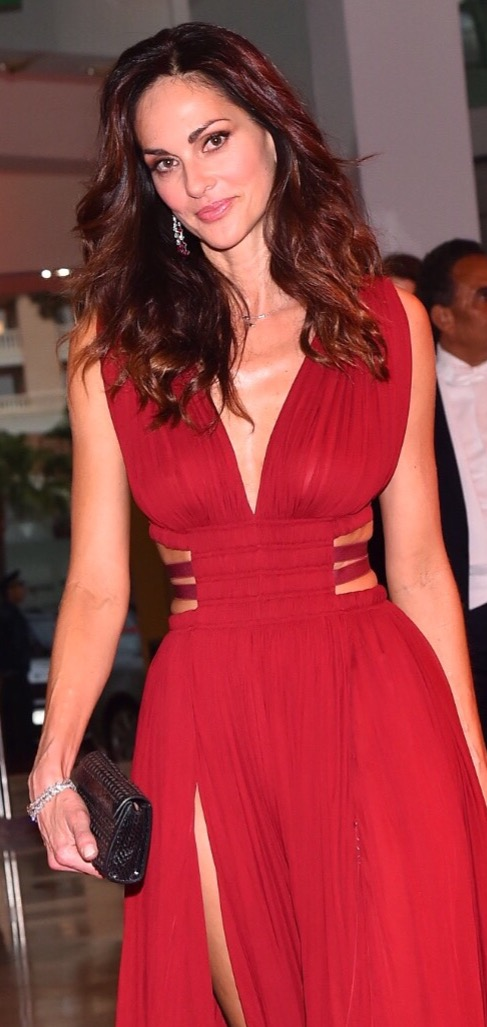
- Born: 15 August 1966 (age 60); Beira, Portuguese Mozambique (now Mozambique)
- Education: Royal Central School of Speech and Drama
- Modeling information
- Height: 1.80 m (5 ft 11 in)
- Hair color: Chestnut
- Eye color: Brown
- Website: www.tashadevasconcelos.com

Tasha Sandra Mota e Cunha de Vasconcelos (born 15 August 1966) is a Canadian supermodel, actress and humanitarian ambassador. She first gained fame in the late 1980s and early 1990s as a supermodel. She was appointed the ambassador for the Institut Pasteur. She has just been appointed as a UN Women Global champion for Planet 50-50 by 2030. She was appointed ambassador to Combat Poverty and Social Exclusion to the European Union. She has been appointed Consul of Malawi to Monaco.

== Biography ==
=== Childhood ===
De Vasconcelos was born in Beira, Mozambique originally Portugal to a Portuguese father. Her paternal grandparents were from northern Portugal aristocratic family and a mother of Noble British ancestry. Her family was forced to flee from two revolutions: the first, in Mozambique(Portugal), when she was 8 years old, and then the second at 14 from Rhodesia (British Empire). They moved to Canada in 1980, where de Vasconcelos studied International Relations at the University of British Columbia.

=== Modelling career ===
At the age of 19, de Vasconcelos was discovered by a scout from Elite Model Management and began her modelling career. She started in New York City and adopted the name Tasha on the suggestion of her agent. She worked for many different brands, including Dolce & Gabbana and Van Cleef & Arpels, and notably for Dior and Yves Saint Laurent.

=== Acting ===
De Vasconcelos' acting career began with a role in the French film Riches, belles etc., in 1998. She then joined the cours Florent, then the Central School of Speech and Drama, in London, and the Actors Studio in Los Angeles.

She appeared in several television series at the beginning of 2000. She acted in the BBC One series Sunburn and portrayed Lauren in five episodes of Perfect World in 2000. The following year she appeared in Largo Winch and in the remake of Murder on the Orient Express for Columbia Broadcasting System. She appeared in Relic Hunter and the television series Dinotopia in 2002, and as Countess Alexandra in the feature film Johnny English, directed by Peter Howitt and released in 2003. The same year, she appeared in Fatal Attraction and Dot the ill. She appeared in the telefilm Une suite pour deux, aired in September 2008 by French channel. TF1

She acted in the play Camino Real from Tennessee Williams, at the Tristan Bates theatre in London.

=== Humanitarian work ===
Since 1996, she has actively promoted healthcare programs around the world, including on the African continent.

She began her work in 1996, following a call from Nelson Mandela she went to South Africa to support the Nelson Mandela Children's foundation and then in 1999 with UNICEF mission to Bolivia and Algeria to support various children's projects with UNAIDS.
In 2005 she returned to Mozambique with UNAIDS on another mission to the country of her birth. In March 2006, the model founded AMOR (Aide Mondiale Orphelins Réconfort), a foundation to reduce the rate of maternal mortality in Kasese, Malawi, and the transmission of AIDS from mother to child. In 2009, the maternity hospital was opened. AMOR was first supported by American actor Paul Newman and Prince Albert II de Monaco. De Vasconcelos was nominated as the first and only ambassador to Institut Pasteur in April 2009, and the following year on 8 March was appointed by president José Manuel Barroso to be ambassador of the European Union to Combat Poverty and Social Exclusion. In November 2010, Tasha de Vasconcelos spoke at the Women's Forum Deauville. In March 2011 at the International Women's Day in Paris, as well as on 23 June 2012 at Villepinte, Tasha de Vasconcelos spoke in favour of the Achraf Refugees.
She was given a humanitarian honour by UNESCO in 2005. She was given the CONDENAST GLAMOUR BEAUTY /HUMANITARIAN AWARD 2011, appointed ambassador to INSTITUT PASTEUR 2009.
2010 appointed Humanitarian ambassador to the European Union.
and 2013 APPOINTED HONORARY CONSUL TO MALAWI in Monaco where she resides.

In January 2016, selected by the United Nations as a UN Women Global Champion 50-50 by 2030, Tasha de Vasconcelos declared: "My mission will be awareness in Women's Health and gender issues and refugee and migrant women. To support and empower women globally".

=== Summary of Humanitarian and Charitable Work ===
Humanitarian work:
1996: Humanitarian mission with Nelson Mandela, Pretoria, South Africa
1999: UNICEF humanitarian mission, Bolivia
2000: UNICEF humanitarian mission, Algeria
2005: UNESCO Humanitarian honour bestowed by secretary-general
2006: UNAIDS mission to Mozambique
2006: March: founded AMOR (Aide Mondiale Orphelins Reconfort) to reduce maternal mortality and help orphans and children worldwide through health care and education, especially in Africa.
2009: 15 April: opened first AMOR maternity hospital in Kasese, Malawi with Prince Albert II of Monaco.
2009: 27 April: appointed first Ambassador for Institut Pasteur (where the AIDS virus was first identified) Paris, France.
2010: 8 March: appointed Humanitarian Ambassador for the European Union to combat poverty and social exclusion, Brussels, Belgium.
2010: November: Speaker, Women's Forum, Deauville, France.
2011: March: Speaker, International Women's Day on behalf of refugees in Iraq.
2012: June: further address at Villepinte, France, on behalf of Iraqi refugees.
2013: Appointed Honorary Consul of Malawi to Monaco
2014: 9 November: speaker on ‘Audacity’, Cité de la Réussite, La Sorbonne, Paris, France.
2015: Official partnership with AMOR and Monaco Princely Government.
2015: Joint project for girls school with the Vatican.
2016: 7 January: officially appointed as a UN Women Global champion for Planet 50-50 by 2030.

Concrete help given through AMOR:
2007: Collegio Infantil: orphanage providing practical help to mothers and orphaned children, Beira, Mozambique.
2009: First maternity hospital in Malawi opened in Kasese in association with Lifeline Malawi
2010: Mobile outreach clinics established in Malawi
2012: Nandumbo eye clinic established, Nanthomba, Malawi
2013: 22 tonnes of medical and paediatric equipment sent to Malawi
2013: Second maternity hospital in Malawi opened in Zomba
2014: First school in Malawi, Nanthomba Primary School, opened in Liwonde in association with Help Malawi
2014: Third maternity hospital in Malawi opened in Machinga
2015: Fourth maternity hospital in Thyolo opened with the support of the Prince's Government of Monaco.
2015: One million trees planted in Malawi with the local community and schools. This action was supported by the Prince Albert II of Monaco Foundation.

== Recent TV and other media ==
2010: ‘La Belle Humanitaire’ 52 minute documentary, France Television
2011: Autobiography, ‘Beauty as a Weapon’ published, Michel Lafon, Paris, France
2013: Sky News report from London, UK
2013: Monaco television special report from Africa
2013: Sky News report from Monaco
2013: CCTV China, Special Report
2014: Monaco television special report from Monaco
2014: CNN special report, live from London, UK
2014: ‘Arise Africa’ TV special report, live from London, UK
2014: TVC News Live Africa special report
2014: CCTV China, Special report Newshour
2015: “Monaco Television special report”
