= Merry Christmas Aubrey Flint =

2026 British Christmas film

- Theatrical release poster
- Directed by: Jack Spring
- Screenplay by: Chris Boyle-McQuarry
- Produced by: Andy Brunskill
- Starring: Celia Imrie; Richard E. Grant; John Bradley; Adjoa Andoh; Sophia Di Martino; Kiell Smith-Bynoe
- Music by: Jeremy James Hunt
- Production companies: WestEnd Films; SUMS Film & Media; Shush Films
- Distributed by: Signature Entertainment
- Release date: 6 November 2026
- Running time: 98 minutes
- Country: United Kingdom
- Language: English

Merry Christmas Aubrey Flint is a British Christmas comedy film directed by Jack Spring and written by Chris Boyle-McQuarry, and featuring an ensemble cast including John Bradley, Celia Imrie, Richard E. Grant, Adjoa Andoh, Sophia Di Martino, Adrian Rawlins, Karl Pilkington, and Kiell Smith-Bynoe. It was released on 6 November 2026.

== Premise ==
An amateur production of A Christmas Carol at a retirement home is reluctantly directed by reclusive man on community service.

== Cast ==
- Celia Imrie as Gloria Lynn
- Richard E. Grant as Mr. Hopkins
- John Bradley as Aubrey Flint
- Adjoa Andoh as Janet
- Sophia Di Martino as Ellen
- Kiell Smith-Bynoe as Kugan
- Adrian Rawlins as Albert
- Karl Pilkington as Colin Barrow
- Nigel Planer as Ned
- Ann Mitchell as Sadie
- Dave Johns as Mr. Formby
- Dustin Demri-Burns as Hugo Fox
- Harriet Webb as Wendy Mallett
- Beau Thompson
- Jim Broadbent as Charles Dickens
- Alex Macqueen as Milton Crawley

== Production ==
The film is directed by Jack Spring, and written by Chris Boyle-McQuarry. It is produced by WestEnd Films and Andy Brunskill for SUMS Film & Media. Production also comes from Shush Films. The film is also produced in association with US company BYUtv.

The cast is led by Celia Imrie, Richard E. Grant, John Bradley, with Adjoa Andoh, Sophia Di Martino, Adrian Rawlins, Karl Pilkington, Kiell Smith-Bynoe, Nigel Planer, Ann Mitchell, Dave Johns, Dustin Demri-Burns, Harriet Webb and Beau Thompson.

Principal photography started in October 2025. Filming locations included York and Bushey Heath.

== Release ==
The film was theatrically released on 6 November 2026, with the world premiere at the Parkway Cinema Cleethorpes on 4 November. Signature Entertainment distributes the film in the UK and Ireland. Samuel Goldwyn Films distributes in the U.S. and Canada. WestEnd Films has also sold the film to Spain (Alfa), Portugal (Nos), Bulgaria (Beta) and Israel (United King).
