= Maggie Ollerenshaw =

English actress

- Born: Margaret Ollerenshaw
- Occupation: Actress
- Years active: 1975–present
- Spouses: Jack Ainscough (m. 1969, divorced) Geoffrey Leesley (m. 2007)
- Children: 1

Margaret Ollerenshaw is an English actress. She is known for playing Mavis in the BBC sitcom Open All Hours (1981–1982) and its sequel Still Open All Hours (2013–2019). Her other television credits include First of the Summer Wine (1988–1989), The House of Eliott (1992) and Lovejoy (1993–1994).

== Career ==
Ollerenshaw played Mrs. Violet Clegg in the short-lived series First of the Summer Wine, and became a more familiar television face after starring in The House of Eliott as Florence Ranby, a dour Victorian and head of the Eliott workroom, who died in a tragic road accident outside the Eliott's fashion house. The actress also featured as Martha in the Andrew Davies adaptation of Trollope's classic He Knew He Was Right.

Her many other television credits include roles in Lovejoy, Coronation Street, Juliet Bravo, Last of The Summer Wine, Heartbeat, Holby City, One Foot In The Grave, Seaview, Teachers, Victoria Wood - As Seen On TV, The Hunt For The Yorkshire Ripper, Midsomer Murders and Wire In The Blood. Her film credits include Britannia Hospital, A Private Function, Pierrepoint and Steven Spielberg's War Horse.

Her one-woman show Yours Sincerely, a musical play about Dame Vera Lynn has played in the UK and abroad. She also starred in the play Screamers at the Warehouse Theatre.

Since 2014, Ollerenshaw has provided the voice of Henrietta (UK/US) in the British animated television series Thomas & Friends. She also voiced the role of The Queen in Little Princess. In 2019, she was in the television show Scarborough as Geraldine, the owner of a hair salon.

== Personal life ==
Ollerenshaw married Jack Ainscough in 1969 but the marriage ended in divorce. In 2007, she married fellow actor Geoffrey Leesley.

== Filmography ==
=== Film ===
Year	Title	Role	Notes
1982	Britannia Hospital	Miss Rowntree	
1984	A Private Function	Woman	
2002	Fuel	Paula	Short film
2005	Pierrepoint: The Last Hangman	Mary Pierrepoint	
2011	War Horse	The Neighbor	

=== Television ===
Year	Title	Role	Notes
1974	The Little Match Girl	Tart	TV film
1976	Red Letter Day	First Mother	Episode: “Well Thank You, Thursday”
1978	Pickersgill People	Dolores Clegg	Episode: "The Primitive"
1978	BBC2 Play of the Week	Annie Griffiths	Episode: "Fairies"
1978	Fallen Hero	Nursing sister	Episode: #1.6
1979	Danger UXB	Betty Salt	Episode: "Digging Out"
1979	Angels	Miss Parr	2 episodes
1979	Last of the Summer Wine	Woman in boat	Episode: "The Flag and Further Snags"
1980	All Creatures Great and Small	Mrs. Binks	Episode: "If Wishes Were Horses"
1980	The Gentle Touch	Mrs. Bond	Episode: "Help"
1980	Play for Today	Staff Nurse	Episode: "Minor Complications"
1980	Juliet Bravo	Sergeant Margaret Cullinane	Episode: "Family Unit"
1981-1982	Open All Hours	Mavis	7 episodes
1981	Coming Home	Trudy	Episode: #1.2
1981	Maybury	Jean Stone	Episode: "What I Mean Is..."
1983, 1985	Seaview	Elaine Shelton	Main cast (all 12 episodes)
1985-1986	Coronation Street	Sandra Pilkington	3 episodes
1987	Star Cops	Dr. Angela Parr	Episode: "Other People's Secrets"
1988-1989	First of the Summer Wine	Mrs. Clegg	13 episodes
1990	One Foot in the Grave	Hilary	Episode: "Dramatic Fever"
1992	Firm Friends	Sheila Bigger	3 episodes
1992	The House of Eliott	Florence Ranby	6 episodes
1993-1994	Three Seven Eleven	Val Peck	4 episodes
1993-1994	Lovejoy	Kate Henshaw	13 episodes
1995	The Bill	Mrs. Riddick	Episode: "Love Me, Love My Dog"
1997	Heartbeat	Norma Braithwaite	Episode: "Closing Ranks"
1997	Last of the Summer Wine	Ethel	Episode: "The Love Mobile"
1999	Dr Willoughby	Fenella Lewis	Episode: "Family Wedding"
2000	Doctors	Margaret Cadogan	Episode: "Blood Ties"
2002	Paradise Heights	Mary	Episode: #1.4
2003	Barbara	Dierdre	Episode: "Who Shot Barbara?"
2003-2004	Coronation Street	Eva Briggs	10 episodes
2004	He Knew He Was Right	Martha	All 4 episodes
2004	Holby City	Jennifer Southwell	Episode: "In at the Deep End"
2005	Cherished	Mary Barry	TV film
2006	Midsomer Murders	Mrs Hopkirk	Episode: "Country Matters"
2006	Wire in the Blood	Joanna Durbridge	Episode: "Hole in the Heart"
2007	The Bad Mother's Handbook	Jessie Pilkington	TV film
2007–present	Little Princess	The Queen (voice)	24 episodes
2008	Doctors	Penelope Hargreaves	Episode: "Lady Muck"
2008	Last of the Summer Wine	Ethel	Episode: "All That Glitters Is Not Elvis"
2009	Midsomer Murders	Eileen Fountain	Episode: "The Dogleg Murders"
2009	Doctors	Jean Furst	Episode: "The Great Escape"
2010	Holby City	Dora Collins	Episode: "Swimming with Sharks"
2011	Grandpa In My Pocket	Brenda Balderdash	Episode: "Lighthouse View, as Good as New"
2011	Doctors	Peggy Hardcastle	Episode: "Who's the Daddy?"
2012	Endeavour	Mrs. Crabbin	Pilot episode
2013	Doctors	Maureen Holdgate	Episode: "Run for Your Life"
2013-2019	Still Open All Hours	Mavis	All 41 episodes
2014-2021	Thomas & Friends	Henrietta (voice)	UK/US versions
2015	Doctors	Lynda Harris	Episode: "The Reader"
2017	Holby City	Helen Pickard	Episode: "The Evolution of Woman"
2019	Doctors	Esther Milne	Episode: "The Getaway"
2019	Scarborough	Geraldine	All 6 episodes
2024	Bad Tidings	April	TV film
2026	The Hairdresser Mysteries	Doris Briggs	Episode: “Storm in a Teacup”
2026	Winter	Helen Carter	Episode: #1.1
