= Mr. Bigstuff =

British comedy television series

- Genre: Comedy
- Created by: Ryan Sampson
- Written by: Ryan Sampson
- Directed by: Matt Lipsey
- Starring: Danny Dyer; Ryan Sampson; Harriet Webb; Adrian Scarborough
- Country of origin: United Kingdom
- Original language: English
- No. of series: 2
- No. of episodes: 12

Production
- Executive producers: Anil Gupta; Jon Mountague; Tom Miller; Sam Myer
- Producer: Hayley Sterling
- Production companies: Sky Studios; Water and Power Productions

Original release
- Network: Sky Max (series 1–2)
- Release: 17 July 2024 – present

Mr. Bigstuff is a British comedy television series created and written by Ryan Sampson, who also stars alongside Danny Dyer. The first series premiered on 17 July 2024 on Sky Max. In September 2024, it was renewed for a second series, which premiered on 24 July 2025. In August 2025, it was renewed for a third series which is set to move to Sky One following the closure of Sky Max. Dyer received the award for Best Male Performance in a Comedy Programme at the 2025 British Academy Television Awards.

== Premise ==
Glen, a meek carpet seller, is trying to save money for his wedding to fiancée Kirsty and is surprised one day to find his bombastic and polar-opposite estranged brother Lee at his house looking for an old friend.

== Cast and characters ==
=== Main ===
- Danny Dyer as Lee
- Ryan Sampson as Glen
- Harriet Webb as Kirsty (series 2; recurring series 1)
- Adrian Scarborough as Ian (series 2; recurring series 1)

=== Supporting ===
- Fatiha El-Ghorri as Aysha
- Philip Philmar as Roger
- Nitin Ganatra as Brian (series 1)
- Geoff Bell as Steve (series 1)
- Victoria Alcock as Sue
- Ned Dennehy as Bunny
- Judi Love as Security Guard (series 1)
- Jocelyn Jee Esien as Jazmine
- Clive Russell as Uncle Ron
- Cheryl Fergison as Julie (series 1)
- Linda Henry as Pam (series 2)
- Rula Lenska as Rita (series 2)
- Parth Thakerar as Julian (series 2)
- Alan Ford as Frank (series 2)
- David Mumeni as El Baz (series 2)
- Shobna Gulati as Sheryl (series 2)
- Tom Hanson as Tyler (series 2)
- Shaun Williamson as The Clown (series 2)

== Episodes ==
Series	Episodes	Originally released		
Series	Episodes	First released	Last released	Network
1	6	17 July 2024	14 August 2024	Sky Max
2	6	24 July 2025	7 August 2025	Sky Max

=== Series 1 (2024) ===
No. overall	No. in series	Title	Directed by	Written by	Original release date
1	1	"Episode 1"	Matt Lipsey	Ryan Sampson	17 July 2024
2	2	"Episode 2"	Matt Lipsey	Ryan Sampson	17 July 2024
3	3	"Episode 3"	Matt Lipsey	Ryan Sampson	24 July 2024
4	4	"Episode 4"	Matt Lipsey	Ryan Sampson	31 July 2024
5	5	"Episode 5"	Matt Lipsey	Ryan Sampson; Gabby Best	7 August 2024
6	6	"Episode 6"	Matt Lipsey	Ryan Sampson	14 August 2024

=== Series 2 (2025) ===
No. overall	No. in series	Title	Directed by	Written by	Original release date
7	1	"Episode 1"	Matt Lipsey	Ryan Sampson	24 July 2025
8	2	"Episode 2"	Matt Lipsey	Gabby Best	24 July 2025
9	2	"Episode 3"	Matt Lipsey	Ryan Sampson; Richard Pinto	31 July 2025
10	2	"Episode 4"	Matt Lipsey	Ryan Sampson; Richard Pinto	31 July 2025
11	2	"Episode 5"	Matt Lipsey	Ryan Sampson	7 August 2025
12	2	"Episode 6"	Matt Lipsey	Richard Pinto	7 August 2025

== Production ==
=== Development ===
The series was announced by Sky in February 2023. Created by Ryan Sampson, it is produced by Sky Studios and Water And Power Productions, with executive producers Anil Gupta, Jon Mountague, Tom Miller, and Sam Myer, with Hayley Sterling as series producer. Sampson said he drew on his own experiences living near Rotherham, South Yorkshire whilst writing the show and includes characters who resemble "oddball" villagers from his home area of North Anston as well as his experiences with his family after the death of his mother.

In September 2024, it was renewed for a second series. In August 2025, it was renewed for a third series.

=== Themes ===
Themes in the show include masculinity, family and brotherhood, and the expectations for men in modern life with Sampson being quoting as saying "we are asking men to be one thing but then also reviling them for being the same. As a result, you feel a bit tapped between feeling like a big, swaggy, alpha male and a nice, tame man" The series has brothers who "are polar opposites and go about being men in opposite ways, and it gets to both of them". He also said that "I'm 5 foot 5 and as gay as the Easter Bunny, I've always felt on the outside looking in. I wanted to write about two men who have different ideas about how to be a man: one’s trying to be a nice guy but feels crippled by it; the other thinks it's all about action, but can't face up to his demons."

=== Casting ===
The cast is led by Danny Dyer and Ryan Sampson. The pair briefly worked together in 2013 on television series Plebs and Sampson told the Radio Times that "after Danny had a cameo on Plebs, I got it into my head to write something about us as brothers. I thought it was funny: I'm a tiny gay from up north and he's, well, Danny Dyer". However, Sampson feared it would not happen due to Dyer's commitments with EastEnders. However, Dyer was announced as leaving the soap opera shortly after Sampson had finished writing the script. Dyer was impressed by the script telling Sky News it was a "clever piece of work. And I think that ultimately, we're making television, we want to entertain people, and so the hardest discipline is to make people laugh... to make them belly laugh - and I think there's some real belly laugh moments in this".

The cast also includes Harriet Webb, Victoria Alcock, Adrian Scarborough, Fatiha El-Ghorri, Ned Dennehy, Geoff Bell, Nitin Ganatra, Clive Russell and Judi Love.

=== Filming ===
Series one was filmed near Dagenham from October 2023. Filming also took place in Hatfield, Hertfordshire in November 2023. First look images from filming were released in February 2024.

== Broadcast ==
The first series premiered on 17 July 2024 on Sky Max. The second series premiered on 24 July 2025. Following the shutdown of Sky Max in February 2026, the third series is set to premiere on Sky One.

== Reception ==
=== Accolades ===
Sampson and Dyer won the Best Comedy Partnership Award at the I Talk Telly Awards in December 2024. In March 2025, Dyer was nominated in the Male Performance in a Comedy Programme category at the 2025 British Academy Television Awards. He went on to win the award at the ceremony in London on 11 May.

=== Critical reception ===
Lucy Mangan in The Guardian described the show as demonstrating Dyer's "charisma and comedy chops" and the series as "an amiable enough series of half hours to spend in his company." Anita Singh in The Daily Telegraph said the "premise is fun" and the "supporting players are solid comedy performers" but felt that Danny Dyer's role was too prescribed to "amuse the kind of “lager, lager, lager” lads who would cheer every time he addressed someone, as he often does here, as a "c---"". Emily Watkins in i (newspaper) described it as "loud and silly with a surprisingly soft heart" and that "charisma rolls off Dyer”. Abha Shah in The Evening Standard gave the show two stars and said it was "slow and lacklustre, it leans heavily on Dyer’s real-life character with turns from former on-screen colleagues with no drive of its own".
