= Ryan Sampson =

English actor (born 1985)

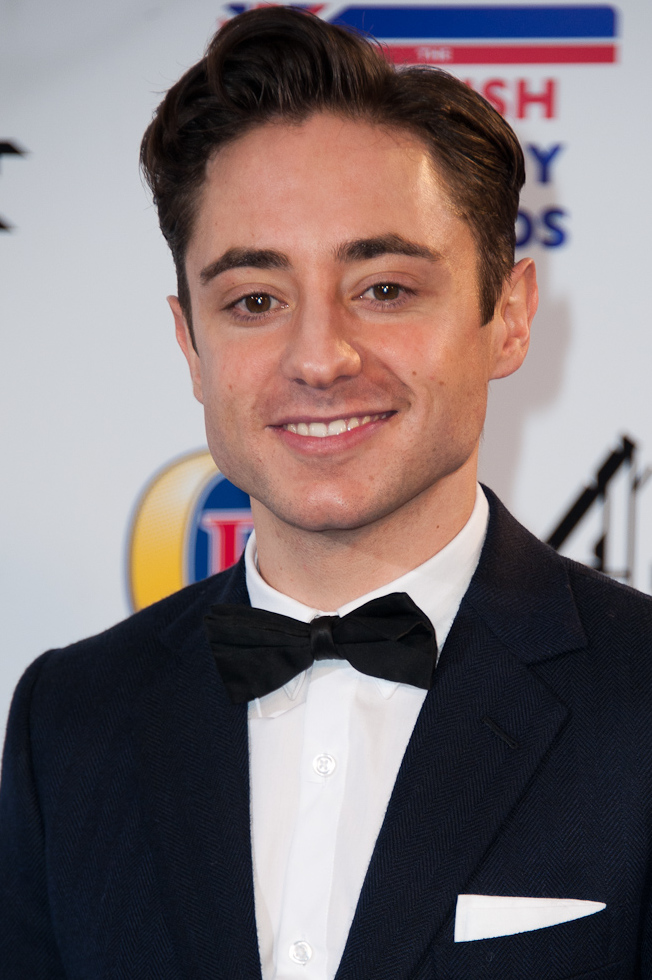
- Portrait of Ryan Sampson at the 2013 British Comedy Awards
- Born: Ryan Oliver Sampson; 28 November 1985 (age 40); Rotherham, South Yorkshire, England
- Education: Wales High School
- Occupation: Actor
- Years active: 2003–present

Ryan Oliver Sampson (born 28 November 1985) is an English actor and writer. He is from Rotherham, South Yorkshire. He is best known for playing Grumio in Plebs, and Tommo in Brassic, as well as starring in his own series Mr Bigstuff, alongside co-star Danny Dyer. He also played Luke Rattigan in the Series 4 two-part story of Doctor Who, "The Sontaran Stratagem" and "The Poison Sky".

== Early life ==
Sampson appeared in school productions such as The Little Shop of Horrors, in which he appeared with fellow student Self Esteem.

== Career ==
Sampson began his career at Sheffield's Crucible Theatre. Prior to After You've Gone, he appeared in Wire in the Blood, in 2003, In Denial of Murder, Heartbeat and Holby City in 2006. He appeared in the BBC Three pilot The Things I Haven't Told You and had a role in two episodes of the 2008 series of Doctor Who, playing the young American genius Luke Rattigan in "The Sontaran Stratagem" and "The Poison Sky". In 2008 he worked at the National Theatre. In 2011 he played a small part in Channel 4 comedy series Fresh Meat. In 2015 he played various characters in the ITV2 sketch show Glitchy. In 2015 he also appeared as Charles 'Boz' Dickens in ITV Encore's The Frankenstein Chronicles. Sampson played Tommo in all 7 seasons of Sky One's 2019 British sitcom Brassic, and Mr Collins in the BBC production "The Other Bennet Sister".

== Personal life ==
Sampson confirmed that he is gay via Twitter in February 2019, publishing a photo of himself with his boyfriend.

== Filmography ==
=== Film ===
Year	Title	Role	Notes
2004	In Denial of Murder	Marcus Edwards	TV film
2008	The Things I Haven't Told You	Mark Lamb	TV film
2009	The Minotaur	Adam	Short film
2013	One Night at the Aristo	The Student	Short film
2014	From Here to Eternity	Private Angelo Maggio	
2015	The Last Post	Phil Burrows	Short film
2018	Clean As You Like	Jock	Short film
2020	Dennis & Gnasher: Unleashed! On the Big Screen	Peter "Pieface" Shepherd	Voice role

=== Television ===
Year	Title	Role	Notes	Ref
2003	Wire in the Blood	Vinny Markham	Episode: "Right to Silence"	
2006	Heartbeat	Paul Eyre	Episode: "Bad Company"	
2006	Holby City	Niall Allen	Episode: "Looking After Number One"	
2007–2008	After You've Gone	Alex Venables	Series regular, 25 episodes	
2008	Doctor Who	Luke Rattigan	Episodes: "The Sontaran Stratagem" & "The Poison Sky" (Series 4)	
2011	Fresh Meat	Rob	Episode: "Series 1, Episode 3"	
2012	The Work Experience	Shussi	Main role; 6 episodes	
2013	Dates	Waiter	Episode: "Jenny & Nick"	
2013–2015	Up the Women	Thomas	Main role; 9 episodes	
2013–2023	Plebs	Grumio	Main role; 39 episodes	
2015	Drunk History	Charles II of England	Episodes: "King Charles II" / "1966 World Cup Trophy Theft" / "Lady Godiva"	
2015	Undercover	Stepan	Main role; 5 episodes	
2015	Strike Back	Matthius	Episode: "Legacy: Part 8"	
2015	Glitchy	Various roles		
2015–2017	The Frankenstein Chronicles	Boz	Main role; 11 episodes	
2016	Holby City	Ivor Weiland	Episodes: "Children of Men" & "A Perfect Life"	
2017	Horrible Histories	Various roles	Episode: "Savage Songs"	
2017	The Crown	Dudley Moore	Episodes: "Beryl" and "Mystery Man"	
2017–2020	Dennis & Gnasher: Unleashed!	Peter "Pieface" Shepherd	Main role; voice role	
2018	Lore	Edward Forman	Episode: "Jack Parsons: The Devil and the Divine"	
2019	Waiting	Various roles	6 episodes	
2019–2025	Brassic	Thomas "Tommo" Schaftner	Main role; 20 episodes	
2024–present	Mr. Bigstuff	Glen	Main role, show-runner/writer, 12 Episodes	
2025	The Other Bennet Sister	Mr. Collins	Episodes 2, 6, 7	

=== Theatre ===
Year	Title	Role	Venue	Notes
2001	Edward II	Prince Edward	Crucible Theatre, Sheffield	
2002	Richard III	Prince Edward	Crucible Theatre, Sheffield	
2005	Over Gardens Out	Dennis	Southwark Playhouse, London	
2005	A Brief History of Helen of Troy	Franklin	Soho Theatre, London	
2006	M. Ibrahim and the Flowers of the Koran	Moïse	Bush Theatre, London	
2008	The Miracle	Billy Hammond	Royal National Theatre, London	
2008	DNA	Adam	Royal National Theatre, London	
2009	Dido, Queen of Carthage	Ganymede	Royal National Theatre, London	
2010	Canary	Russell	Hampstead Theatre, London	
2010	Brighton Beach Memoirs	Eugene Jerome	Watford Palace Theatre, Watford	
2011	The Kitchen Sink	Billy	Bush Theatre, London	
2012	Floyd Collins	Skeets Miller	Southwark Playhouse, London	
2013	From Here to Eternity	Private Angelo Maggio	Shaftesbury Theatre, London	
2016	Britten in Brooklyn	Benjamin Britten	Wilton's Music Hall, London	
