= Kate & Koji =

British TV sitcom (ITV, 2020–2022)

- Genre: Sitcom
- Created by: Andy Hamilton; Guy Jenkin
- Written by: Andy Hamilton; Guy Jenkin
- Directed by: Ben Kellett
- Starring: Brenda Blethyn; Jimmy Akingbola (Series 1); Okorie Chukwu (Series 2); Blake Harrison; Barbara Flynn
- Theme music composer: Mike Hawker; Ivor Raymonde
- Opening theme: "I Only Want to Be with You"
- Country of origin: United Kingdom
- Original language: English
- No. of series: 2
- No. of episodes: 12

Production
- Executive producer: Jimmy Mulville
- Producers: Andy Hamilton; Guy Jenkin; Debbie Pisani (Series 1); Chris Jones (Series 2)
- Production locations: BBC Elstree Centre; Herne Bay (exteriors)
- Cinematography: Martin Hawkins
- Editor: Mark Williams
- Running time: 30 minutes (inc. adverts)
- Production company: Hat Trick Productions

Original release
- Network: ITV
- Release: 18 March 2020 – 13 April 2022

Kate & Koji is a British television sitcom produced by Hat Trick Productions for ITV. It was created and written by Andy Hamilton and Guy Jenkin. The show aired from 18 March 2020 to 13 April 2022. The series follows Kate (Brenda Blethyn), a working-class café owner in the neglected coastal resort Seagate in south Essex, who develops a strong friendship with regular customer Koji (Jimmy Akingbola), an asylum-seeking doctor. For Series 2, Akingbola was replaced by Okorie Chukwu.

On 18 November 2022, ITV announced Kate & Koji would not return for a third series due to a drop in ratings. 12 episodes were produced.

== Plot ==
Kate (Brenda Blethyn) is a somewhat prickly, working-class woman who runs an old-fashioned café in the neglected coastal resort Seagate in south Essex. She soon develops a strong but volatile friendship with regular customer Koji (Jimmy Akingbola in Series 1 and Okorie Chukwu in Series 2). After grilling him on why he doesn't spend any money, he reveals that he doesn't work; although he is a doctor, he is also an asylum-seeker. After word gets out, Koji becomes the unofficial general practitioner and holds 'surgery' in the café, racking up customers for Kate, who offers him free food to keep the scheme going.

== Production ==
The exterior of the seaside café was filmed at Frasiers Pie and Mash Shop in Herne Bay, standing in for the fictional seaside town of Seagate. The production also filmed exteriors of The Divers Arms pub and various scenes around the promenade and Herne Bay Pier and an exterior scene at Herne Bay industrial estate. A further sequence was shot on the promenade featuring a storm and its after-effects. Interior scenes were shot in front of a live studio audience at BBC Elstree Centre.

== Cast ==
- Brenda Blethyn as Kate Abbott, the owner of the café
- Jimmy Akingbola (Series 1) and Okorie Chukwu (Series 2) as Koji, an African asylum seeker doctor working in the café
- Blake Harrison as 'Medium' Dan, Kate's nephew who works as a decorator
- Barbara Flynn as Councillor Lavinia Bone, a snobbish council member and Kate's nemesis
- Victor McGuire as Mr Mullholland, a regular at the café
- Rosalind Ayres as Iris, another regular at the café
- Gary Lammin as The Postman

== Episodes ==
Series	Episodes	Originally released	
Series	Episodes	First released	Last released
1	6	18 March 2020	22 April 2020
2	6	16 March 2022	13 April 2022

=== Series 1 (2020) ===
No. overall	No. in series	Title	Directed by	Written by	Original release date
1	1	"The Encounter"	Ben Kellett	Andy Hamilton & Guy Jenkin	18 March 2020
When Kate finds out that her new acquaintance is a doctor but he is prohibited from working whilst seeking asylum, she hatches a plan that may be mutually beneficial to both involved.
2	2	"Undercover Clinic"	Ben Kellett	Andy Hamilton & Guy Jenkin	25 March 2020
With Kate and Koji's undercover clinic in full swing, the last thing they need is a visit from Dr Radwan. Medium keeps Koji calm, and Kate cooks up a surefire way to get back at an adversary.
3	3	"The Claim"	Ben Kellett	Andy Hamilton & Guy Jenkin	1 April 2020
Despite Kate being sued after an accident in the café, she refuses to back down and Koji is reluctant to get involved. Although Medium is convinced she should just apologise and get it over with, Kate suspects the legal threats may have something to do with Councillor Bone.
4	4	"The Storm"	Ben Kellett	Andy Hamilton & Guy Jenkin	8 April 2020
When word reaches that a storm is headed for town, Kate refuses to step in line, much to the grief of Councillor Bone. Koji discovers he has been given a jacket with an unfortunate history, and Medium may have lost Kate a lot of money on the horses.
5	5	"Dennis"	Ben Kellett	Andy Hamilton & Guy Jenkin	15 April 2020
When Kate's flashy ex-husband Dennis arrives in town with his much younger wife, Kate feigns an attachment to Koji. Councillor Bone is sure their relationship is a front, but that doesn't stop a good old-fashioned show down at the pub.
6	6	"Working Illegally"	Ben Kellett	Andy Hamilton & Guy Jenkin	22 April 2020
Not for the first time, Kate is being sued, but this time by Councillor Bone. Koji discovers he is under investigation for working illegally, and things do not improve when he tells Kate what he thinks about her grandson.

=== Series 2 (2022) ===
No. overall	No. in series	Title	Directed by	Written by	Original release date
7	1	"Lockdown Legends"	Ben Kellett	Andy Hamilton & Guy Jenkin	16 March 2022
Kate and Medium have been nominated for a 'Lockdown Legend' award, for their work during lockdown by giving meals to people who were shielding. Medium is very excited to collect the award, but Kate is less excited when she finds out that Councillor Bone is presenting it to her.
8	2	"Koji in Charge"	Ben Kellett	Andy Hamilton & Guy Jenkin	23 March 2022
Kate has hurt her ankle, so Koji offers to run the café while she recovers. Meanwhile, Medium wants some reviews on the novel he has written.
9	3	"Memories"	Ben Kellett	Andy Hamilton & Guy Jenkin	30 March 2022
Koji is subjected to racial abuse by some brothers in the town. Kate looks through a number of her dad’s old things, and finds a gun he used in the world war. Medium and Koji suggest she take it down to the police station and she reluctantly agrees. When Medium arrives at the station, he finds out Kate has been arrested. She stated she threatened the brothers who racially abused Koji with the gun, but adds she wasn’t arrested for that, she was arrested for accidentally showing the gun to people in the bank.
10	4	"Koji’s Date"	Ben Kellett	Andy Hamilton & Guy Jenkin	6 April 2022
Koji admits he has a romantic connection to Lisa (played by Chizzy Akudolu), so Kate suggests they have a date at her café, which doesn’t end well. Meanwhile, Kate sees that her café is the 14th most popular café in Seagate… out of 14 cafés, so she tries her best to get up higher on the list. Eventually she does, but this is because she made customers give her good reviews.
11	5	"Saint Lavinia"	Ben Kellett	Andy Hamilton & Guy Jenkin	13 April 2022
Councillor Bone is trying to become a better, forgiving person and tries to help Kate financially, after she made a promise to God. Meanwhile, Koji suffers a curious symptom. Note: This is the double-bill episode finale.
12	6	"Vote For Kate"	Ben Kellett	Andy Hamilton & Guy Jenkin	13 April 2022
Kate decides to participate in an election and Koji gets an unwelcome visit from a local criminal. Medium is set to leave for a new job abroad, while Koji's appeal is going badly and it looks as if Kate may be left alone.
