= BEFFTA Awards =

Award ceremony (founded 2009)

- Description: Outstanding achievements in entertainment, film, fashion, television, arts, sports, leadership, entrepreneurship and philanthropy
- Country: United Kingdom
- First award: 2009; 17 years ago
- Website: www.beffta.com

The Black Entertainment, Film, Fashion, Television, Arts and Sports Awards (commonly abbreviated as BEFFTA) are an awards ceremony aimed at honouring the best entertainment, showbiz, leadership and sports personalities from the black and ethnic communities in the United Kingdom, United States, Africa, Caribbean, Canada, Asia, Australia, Europe and globally.

== History ==
The event was founded in 2009 by United Kingdom-based philanthropist and entrepreneur Pauline Long. The aim of the awards is to recognise and celebrate the achievements within the African and Caribbean community from the world of fashion, music, film, media and TV.

The very first ceremony took place during Black History Month on 17 October 2009 at the Hilton London Metropole.

== Categories ==
The award has categories to accommodate all areas of the entertainment and arts industry, which include Music, Dance, Comedy, Radio, Television, Films, Models, DJs, Events, Photography, Fashion designers, Magazine and newspapers, Hair stylists, and Make-up artists.

Categories in the Black Entertainment, Film, Fashion, Television, Arts and Sports Awards are as follows:

=== Music ===
- Best Female Act
- Best Male Act
- Best Unsigned Act
- Best Female Gospel Act
- Best Male Gospel Act
- Best International Gospect Act
- Best International Female Act
- Best International Male Act
- Best UK Female African Act
- Best UK Male African Act
- Best Newcomer African Act
- Best UK Reggae Act
- Best Female International Afrobeats Act
- Best Male International Afrobeats Act
- Best Female International Caribbean Act
- Best Male International Caribbean Act
- Best Female African Legend
- Best Male African Legend
- Best Music Producer
- Best Music Video Director
- Best Music Video Producer
- Best Music Video DOP
- Best Music Video
- Best Record Label
- Best Musician
- Best Songwriter

=== Dance ===
- Best Dance Act
- Best Dance Choreographer

=== Comedy ===
- Best Male Comedian
- Best Female Comedian

=== Radio ===
- Radio Station of the year
- Female Radio Personality of the year
- Male Radio Personality of the year

=== Podcast ===
- Podcast of the year
- Podcast Presenter of the year

=== Newspapers/Magazines/Blogs/Social Media Group ===
- Best Community Newspaper
- Magazine of the year
- Journalist of the year
- Blog of the year
- Best Community Website
- Best Social Media Community Group

=== Events ===
- Best Events Promoter
- Event of The Year
- Best Event Planner

=== DJ ===
- Female DJ of the year
- Male Dj of the year
- Best International DJ

=== Photographers ===
- Best Events Photographer
- Best Fashion Photographer

=== Fashion Designers ===
- Best Male Fashion Designer
- Best Female Fashion Designer

=== Stylists ===
- Best Hair Stylist
- Best Wardrobe Stylist

=== Make-up Artists ===
- Best Make-up Artist
- Best Make-up Brand

=== Fashion Choreographers ===
- Best Fashion Choreographer

=== Models ===
- Best male model
- Best female model
- Best Modelling Agency

=== Beauty Pageants ===
- Best Beauty Pageant
- Best Beauty Queen
- Best Former Beauty Queen
- Best Beauty Pageant Director

=== Film Category ===
- Best director
- Best Actor
- Best Actress
- Best Supporting Actor
- Best Supporting Actress
- Best African Film Director
- Best African Supporting Actress
- Best African Supporting Actor
- Best African Actress
- Best African Actor
- Best International Film
- Best International African Film
- Best UK African Film
- Best UK Film
- Best UK African Rising Star
- Best International African Rising Star
- International Rising Star
- Best Producer
- Best African Producer
- Best Short Film
- Best screenwriter/Scriptwriter
- Best theatre production
- Best Cinematographer

=== TV Category ===
- Best Actress
- Best Actor
- Best TV Station
- Best TV Show
- Best TV personality
- Best presenter
- Best Webseries
- Best online TV

=== ART Category ===
- Best Spoken Word Artist/Poets
- Best Art Director
- Best Author

=== BEFFTA UK Special Awards ===
- BEFFTA YOUNG FEMALE ACHIEVER AWARD
- BEFFTA YOUNG MALE ACHIEVER AWARD
- BEFFTA INSPIRATION AWARD
- BEFFTA FASHION ICON
- BEFFTA FILM ICON
- BEFFTA ENTERTAINMENT ICON
- BEFFTA MEDIA ICON
- BEFFTA CREATIVE ICON
- BEFFTA EXCELLENCE AWARD
- BEFFTA LEADERSHIP AWARD
- BEFFTA HUMANITARIAN AWARD
- BEFFTA BEST SPORTS PERSONALITY
- BEFFTA FEMALE LIFETIME ACHIEVEMENT AWARD
- BEFFTA MALE LIFETIME ACHIEVEMENT AWARD
- BEFFTA FEMALE LEGEND AWARD
- BEFFTA MALE LEGEND AWARD
- BEFFTA BUSINESS AWARD
- BEFFTA KEYWORKER AWARD
- BEFFTA CHARITY AWARD
- BEFFTA ACTIVIST AWARD

== Voting ==
The nomination process is in the hands of the public, then there is a vetting and shortlisting process for finalists, before public voting commences. This helps the organisers to reach the most relevant acts and be able to control the number of recipients.
