= Homicide and Major Crime Command =

Division of the London Metropolitan Police

The Homicide and Major Crime Command (SCO 1) is an Operational Command Unit of the Metropolitan Police responsible for the investigation of homicide and other serious crimes in London. Most of their work was carried out by major investigation teams (MITs), of which there were 24. It was formerly known as the Homicide and Serious Crime Command (SCD 1).

As of May 2018, there were 722 personnel in SCO 1, including 540 police officers and 182 civilian staff.

== Major investigation teams ==
Major investigation teams (MITs) are the specialised homicide squads of the Homicide and Major Crime Command—there are twenty-four MITs within the MPS. MITs investigate cases of murder, manslaughter, attempted murder where the evidence of intended threat and other investigations identified for specialist needs.

MITs were established in 2000 to replace the former Area Major Incident Pools (AMIPs) as part of the MPS's Serious Crime Group. In 2001, there were thirty-one murder investigation teams operating in London, made up of eight hundred and thirty-four police officers, one hundred and eighty-two civilian staff, and fourteen senior detectives.

Currently, all homicide investigation in London is undertaken by the Specialist Crime and Operations Directorate's Homicide Command, which is split geographically into five units (West, Central, East, North and South), each led by a Detective Superintendent. Each of the Command Units has four Major Investigation Teams (MITs), consisting of fifty staff, led by a Detective Chief Inspector (DCI), who performs the role of senior investigating officer (SIO).

== Other units ==
In addition to the MITs, the Homicide and Serious Crime Command also had five citywide units:

- The Central Criminal Court Trials Unit worked with the MITs and Crown Prosecution Service on cases that go to trial at the Central Criminal Court at the Old Bailey. The unit also advocated good practice and procedure through the Policy Unit, Forensic Science Services and the Detective Training Academy.
- The Special Projects Investigation Unit reviewed serious crime investigations and conducted primary investigations in certain cases.
- The Coroner's Office ensured that investigations Were correctly undertaken within the legal constraints of the powers of the Coroner. Coroner's Officers had a key role as liaison between Operational Command Units, the Coroner's Office and the families of the victims. They also attended the scenes of unexplained deaths to support officers by identifying possible causes of death and advising on scene preservation and the recovery of the deceased.
- The HOLMES Support Unit supported police forces nationwide in their use of HOLMES, the Home Office Large Major Enquiry System.
- Forensic Review Support staff reviewed current or historical scenes of crime evidence. The unit worked with the Specialist Crime Review Group and Homicide Units and provided advice on forensic evidence recovery including forensic science advances.
