= Derren Litten =

English comedy writer, actor (born 1970)

- Born: 21 December 1970 (age 55); Hull, East Riding of Yorkshire, England
- Occupations: Actor; television writer; television director
- Years active: 1994–present (actor); 2004–present (writer); 2020–present (bar owner)
- Known for: Comedy; television
- Notable work: The Catherine Tate Show (BBC, 2004–2007); Benidorm (ITV, 2007–2018); The Spa (Sky Living, 2013); Benidorm Live (2018–2019)
- Spouse: Jake Canuso (div. 2024)
- Website: www.derrenlitten.com

Derren Ronald Litten (born 21 December 1970) is an English comedy writer, actor and director, best known as the creator and writer of the sitcom Benidorm. He co-wrote The Catherine Tate Show, in which he plays several characters in the first two series and the 2005 Christmas special. He has acted in many TV comedy and drama series including Perfect World, French and Saunders, Spaced, EastEnders, Coronation Street, and Pie in the Sky with Richard Griffiths. Litten's first sitcom was Benidorm, which began airing on ITV in 2007. The series follows various groups of holiday makers and staff in the all-inclusive Solana resort located in Benidorm. The series received strong ratings and later extended its runtime, running for 10 series ending in 2018.

Litten wrote an episode of Not Going Out and is also the credited writer of an episode of the Only Fools and Horses spin-off The Green Green Grass. He also wrote a remake episode of Are You Being Served? which three of the cast had previously appeared in Benidorm, Sherrie Hewson, John Challis and Niky Wardley. It was poorly received by critics.

== Early life and education ==
Litten was born in Hull, East Riding of Yorkshire, England. He has a brother, Russ. Litten attended Hessle High School in East Yorkshire, but finished full time education without passing any GCSE certifications. He studied acting at The Central School of Speech and Drama where he met Catherine Tate. He left Central in 1993.

== Career ==
=== 1993–2005 ===
Litten worked as a jobbing actor for 10 years appearing in shows such as Green Wing, Pie in the Sky, Spaced, French & Saunders, Doc Martin, EastEnders, Casualty and Perfect World but it was not until 2003 when Tate asked Litten to write sketches for her TV show. Litten agreed despite having no experience in script writing. In 2004, Litten was nominated for a BAFTA Craft award in the category of Best New Writer.

In 2000, he appeared in an episode of Heartbeat (series 10, episode 1). After two series and a Christmas Special (2005) writing for and appearing in The Catherine Tate Show, Litten met writer John Sullivan who asked if he would be interested in contributing to his Only Fools & Horses spin off The Green Green Grass. Litten wrote one episode and co-wrote another with Sullivan.

=== 2006–2018 ===
In 2006, Litten penned his own comedy for ITV based in a Spanish all-inclusive holiday resort. Benidorm turned out to be a ratings hit for ITV and was also nominated for a BAFTA in the category of Situation Comedy. From series 3 onwards the half-hour sitcom was turned into an hour-long show. In October 2011, Constable & Robinson published Litten's book to accompany the series, The Benidorm Guide to A Happy Holiday. Benidorm has won numerous awards including two National Television Awards.

In 2012, a one-off sketch was produced for Sport Relief featuring the Benidorm cast. The sketch involved several of the characters singing on Britain's Got Talent. In January 2013, Sky Living announced its new sitcom The Spa, written and created by Litten and starring Rebecca Front, would air from 7 February 2013. In this series, Litten also plays a regular character, Marcus, an overweight fitness instructor who uses a wheelchair.

In 2016, Litten wrote the script for the pilot episode for the remake of Are You Being Served? The remake starred Jason Watkins, Sherrie Hewson, Roy Barraclough and Justin Edwards. Although Litten was preparing for a whole series, the BBC cancelled the revival after the first episode aired.

=== 2019–present ===
Litten wrote and directed the sitcom Scarborough for the BBC. It started airing in September 2019. It was poorly received by critics, and cancelled after one series.

In 2020, following information that Scarborough had been axed by the BBC, Litten embarked on a new career, purchasing a bar in Benidorm. The bar opened in July 2020 and is named Mateo's Bar after a character in the show. The venue features real-life props from the set of Benidorm, and guest appearances from cast members from the show. In September 2020, due to enforced quarantine rules from COVID-19, Mateo's was temporarily closed.

== Personal life ==
Litten is gay. When he came out to his parents, his father said, "I don't understand what you've chosen to be but promise me one thing, you'll never bring any of your friends around here.". Litten was married to Benidorm star Jake Canuso but they separated in late 2022 and divorced in August 2024.

== Filmography ==
Year	Title	Role	Notes
1994	Minder	2nd Heavy	Series 10 episode 4
1995	A Touch of Frost	PC Hobbs	Series 3 episode 2: Quarry
1996	EastEnders	Mick	3 episodes
1997	Pie in the Sky	PC Ed Guthrie	7 episodes; series 5
1998	Faith No More	N/A	Music video for "I Started a Joke"
2000	Heartbeat	Skinner	Series 10 episode 1: Chalk and Cheese
2000–2001	Perfect World	Vaughan Rogers	13 episodes
2001	Spaced	Daisy's Benefit Clerk	Series 2 episode 2: Change
2003	Sweet Medicine	Rev. Simon Roberts	5 episodes
2004	French and Saunders	N/A	Series 6 episode 4
2004–2005	The Catherine Tate Show	Various	13 episodes; also co-writer
2005	Dalziel and Pascoe	Mad Dog	2 episodes
2005	Doc Martin	Tony	Series 2 episode 5
2006	Green Wing	Traffic cop	1 episode
2006	The Green Green Grass	N/A	Writer; 2 episodes in series 2
2007–2018	Benidorm	Various	6 episodes as actor; also series creator; writer of 70 episodes; director of 2 episodes
2013	The Spa	Marcus	8 episodes; also writer and creator
2013	Psychobitches	N/A	Co-writer; 2 episodes in series 1
2016	Are You Being Served?	N/A	Writer
2018	Benidorm: 10 Years on Holiday	Himself	Television film
2019	Hope Gap	Friendline man	
2019	Scarborough	Jack	5 episodes; also writer and creator
2020	Urban Myths	Norman	Series 4 episode 1
2022	Coronation Street	Bernard Barnes	2 episodes
2023	Bad Boys Go To Benidorm	Himself	Short film
