= Caroline Harding =

English actress and playwright (born 1962)

- Born: March 1962 (age 64); Marlow, Buckinghamshire, England
- Education: Guildford School of Acting
- Occupations: Actress; playwright
- Years active: 1992–present
- Spouse(s): Jason Watkins (m. 19??; div. ??) Chris Gascoyne (m. 2002)

Caroline Harding (born March 1962) is an English television actress and playwright. She has played recurring roles in the ITV soap opera Coronation Street and crime drama Scott & Bailey, as well as in the Netflix six-part mockumentary sitcom Hard Cell. She has also written and performed in numerous theatrical productions, including her play Two Sisters, which received nominations for two Manchester Evening News Theatre Awards for Best Play and Best Performance in 2007, and a one-woman show about the eminent Restoration actress Nell Gwyn.

== Early life and education ==
Harding was born and raised in Marlow, Buckinghamshire, England. She graduated from the Guildford School of Acting and worked extensively for the Royal Shakespeare Company in the late '80s.

== Career ==
=== Stage ===
Together with fellow actress Candida Gubbins, she formed the theatre company Two Friends Productions in 2000. Soon after, she made her debut as a playwright with Postcards from Maupassant, a 2001 play based on the late 19th-century short stories by French author Guy de Maupassant, in which she also starred. It first premiered at the Edinburgh Festival and then, after receiving rave reviews from critics, went on a national tour. Sam Marlowe of The Times wrote: "All three actors are excellent throughout, but here Harding in particular is painfully funny and sad as the child-like, crazed wife. Her portrayal is still more impressive when you consider that, by contrast, just a couple of scenes earlier she was an elegant, icy society doyenne in sequins and silk." Ten years after the initial premiere, Harding adapted it into French Fancies.

Her next play was Two Sisters, a gripping black comedy set in 1880's Russia and directed by Chris Gascoyne. First performed in July 2006 at the Buxton Festival, it was soon followed by a national tour and nominations for two Manchester Evening News Theatre Awards for Best Play and Best Performance. Around the same time, Harding starred in the productions of Terrence McNally's Frankie and Johnny in the Clair de Lune (2004), Tom Stoppard's The Real Thing (2005) and Arthur Miller's Death of a Salesman (2007).

In 2008 she wrote and performed a one-woman show about one of the first actresses on the English stage and a long-time mistress of King Charles II of England, Nell Gwyn. She called it Pretty Witty Nell after a description of Gwyn by Samuel Pepys, the famed diarist and social commentator of the day. Described by Harding as "a sort of historical stand-up", the show toured the UK for two years.

=== Television ===
Her television career began in a 1992 episode of the ITV crime drama Van der Valk, based on Nicolas Freeling's novels about a detective in Amsterdam, played by Barry Foster. She then appeared in all four episodes of the BBC Two medical drama Degrees of Error (1995), starring Beth Goddard, and all six episodes of the BBC One legal drama Fish (2000), starring Paul McGann in the eponymous role. In 2007, she briefly appeared opposite Robert Pattinson and Holly Grainger in The Bad Mother's Handbook, the television adaptation of the best-selling novel of the same name by Kate Long. She then had recurring roles in Scott & Bailey and Doctors in the early 2010s.

For three months in autumn 2020 she appeared in the ITV soap opera Coronation Street as Dr. Howarth, who treated the dying son of Steve McDonald and Leanne Battersby, and later told the court it would be an act of kindness and compassion to switch off his life support. Harding has also played five different characters, including three doctors, in another popular ITV soap opera, Emmerdale.

In 2022 she appeared as series regular Sal in Hard Cell, Catherine Tate's Netflix mockumentary sitcom set in a women's prison. Together with Lorna Brown, she led a storyline about a couple who found love in the prison and have no desire to leave.

== Personal life ==
Harding has been married to actor Chris Gascoyne, best known for his role as Peter Barlow in the soap opera Coronation Street, since 2002. In 2004, they starred opposite each other in the Octagon Theatre production of Frankie and Johnny in the Clair de Lune. The couple have a daughter, Belle. Harding also has two children, Pip and Freddie, from a previous marriage to actor Jason Watkins.

== Filmography ==
Year	Title	Role	Notes
1992	Van der Valk	Maarte de Kleine	Episode: "Still Waters"
1992	The Old Boy Network	Journalist	Episode: "The Book of Revelations"
1992	Waiting for God	Janet Follett	Episode: "The Estate Agent"
1993	The Buddha of Suburbia	New York Interpreter	2 episodes
1995	A Touch of Frost	A&E Sister	Episode: "Dead Male One"
1995	Degrees of Error	Susan	4 episodes
1999	Dangerfield	Sheila Lardner	Episode: "Through a Glass, Darkly"
2000	Doctors	Eve Sharpe	Episode: "God's Will"
2000	Fish	Juliette Vishnevski	6 episodes
2000	Casualty	Louise Bennett	Episode: "Getting to Know You"
2000	EastEnders	Welfare Officer	1 episode
2004	Doctors	Harriet Scott	Episode: "Turning Back the Clock"
2005	Casualty	Ruby Townend	2 episodes
2005	Emmerdale	Belinda Connors	1 episode
2006	Life on Mars	Raimes' Lawyer	1 episode
2006	Strictly Confidential	Stephanie	2 episodes
2007	The Bad Mother's Handbook	Sandra Gale	TV film
2007	The Royal	Diane Fletcher	Episode: "Laura"
2008	Cold Blood	Mrs. Armstrong	Episode: "The Last Hurrah"
2008	Emmerdale	Dr. Judd	1 episode
2008	Spooks: Code 9	Sarah	1 episode
2009	Casualty 1909	Edith Dean	Known as London Hospital in the USA; 2 episodes
2010	Holby City	Sally Carley	Episode: "Thursday's Child"
2013	Scott & Bailey	Louise	4 episodes
2013	Emmerdale	Dr. Garrett	2 episodes
2013	Mount Pleasant	Maître d'	1 episode
2013	Holby City	Anja Fancourt	Episode: "If I Needed Someone"
2014	Doctors	Grace Henning	5 episodes
2015	Coronation Street	Consultant	2 episodes
2016–2017	Emmerdale	Prosecution Barrister	3 episodes
2018	Emmerdale	Dr. Todd	2 episodes
2020	Coronation Street	Dr. Howarth	18 episodes
2022	Hard Cell	Sal	6 episodes
2023	Happy Valley	SIO Mary Whitaker	1 episode
