= Silent Grace =

2001 film directed by Maeve Murphy

- Theatrical poster
- Directed by: Maeve Murphy
- Written by: Maeve Murphy
- Produced by: Gerry McColgan; Deirdre McMahon
- Starring: Orla Brady; Cathleen Bradley
- Cinematography: David Katznelson
- Edited by: Breege Rowley
- Release date: 2001
- Country: Ireland
- Language: English

Silent Grace is a 2001 Irish feature film written and directed by Maeve Murphy. A fictional story based on real events, covering the untold story of Republican women prisoners involvement in the 1980/81 Dirty Protest and first hunger strike. It is about friendship and survival. The film is inspired by Nell McCafferty's The Armagh Women and based on the play/screenplay Now and at the Hour of Our Death that Murphy co-wrote with theatre company Trouble and Strife. Silent Grace stars Orla Brady, Cathleen Bradley, with Cara Seymour, Dawn Bradfield, Carol Scanlan, Conor Mullen, and Patrick Bergin. It received completion funds from The Irish Film Board.

Silent Grace was chosen as the UK entry for the Cannes Film Festival in 2002 but as it previously screened in the Cannes market in 2001, it could not be considered any further for competition. The film premiered at the Galway Film Fleadh 2001. It then was selected for the Taormina, Moscow, Foyle, Dinard and Hamptons International Film Festival USA (nominated for the Conflict and Resolution Award). A small cinema release followed in UK/Ireland via Guerilla Films in 2004. The film was made no. 38 in The Irish Times Best 50 Irish films ever made list on 2 May 2020. Silent Grace was critically acclaimed, and was awarded the Soka Art Award (Japan).

Silent Grace experienced a revival and wider audience in 2017 after three major articles in the Irish Times Culture section about the women and the film that had been written out of history. On 24 June 2017, TV3 gave Silent Grace its nationwide broadcast premiere at primetime, in the Republic of Ireland, on Be3. TV3 said in IFTN "Silent Grace firmly puts women back in the 1980s narrative and makes compelling viewing". The Sunday Times made it one of the "Films of the Week". The Foyle Film Festival had a special 20th anniversary screening of the film with a Q&A with Maeve Murphy and Orla Brady chaired by James Flynn in November 2020. London Breeze Film Festival hosted a 25th anniversary celebration screening on October 23 2026 at The Garden Cinema with a panel discussion afterwards about women and film/progress. "fought and won its place in the cinema of the Troubles canon". The Irish World newspaper said Silent Grace is "one of the most important Irish films ever."

== Plot ==
Aine, a young tear-away criminal, is thrown into the same cell as Eileen, a high-ranking Republican woman leader. At first at odds, Eileen helps save Aine's sanity. An unlikely friendship develops between them as Aine joins the protest and Eileen helps her to survive. In a remarkable turn of events, Eileen embarks on a hunger strike, and Aine risks everything to help save her life.

== Cast ==
- Orla Brady as Eileen
- Cathleen Bradley as Aine
- Cara Seymour as Margaret
- Dawn Bradley as Geraldine
- Carol Scanlan as Aine's Mother
- Rob Newman as Father McGarry
- Conor Mullen as the Governor
- Patrick Bergin as Peter/IRA Leader

== Reception ==
Silent Grace was critically acclaimed. Michael Dwyer in the Irish Times gave it three stars and said it was "unusually even-handed, well judged... rooted in its humanist agenda, surmounts the limits of its very low budget, to emerge as a work of sincerity and concern." Tara Brady wrote in Dublin's Hot Press, where it was Critics Choice, "Maeve Murphy must be some kind of genius... brilliantly confounds expectations... compelling coming of age drama, wonderfully humane... Orla Brady is magnificent.... I urge you to seek it out". Larushka Ivan-Zadeh in the Metro in London gave it 4 stars "compelling." And it was in their Top Ten Films for two weeks. Peter Bradshaw of The Guardian said it "bodes well for Murphy's future movies". Ronnie Schieb in Variety, David Parkinson in The Radio Times, The Evening Standard, Rich Cline in Shadows on the Wall, Anton Bietel in Movie Gazette, Belfast Telegraph and The Huffington Post reviewed it favourably.

However, as more films were made about the male hunger strikers, Silent Grace often ceased to be mentioned in the hunger strike film discourse. It was not until its 2017 revival when it was placed fully back on the map due to the promoting of the film from the Irish Times and TV3. Silent Grace was received very favourably, with a fresh review in The Irish Times Film Section and selected "Films of the Week" in The Sunday Times. Maeve Murphy and Patrick Bergin appeared on Breakfast TV on TV3 for the debut broadcast at prime time.

Silent Grace was added to the Hulu streaming service in 2015. In May 2020, The Irish Times listed Silent Grace as number 38 in their list of the 50 greatest Irish films of all time. The IFI added Silent Grace to IFI International in perpetuity in June 2021. The BFI added Silent Grace to their political film collection and Women with a Movie Camera Selection in 2022. Silent Grace was discussed in relation to Steve McQueen's Hunger noting that Silent Grace dramatised "the largely unreported women's involvement in the Dirty Protest and Hunger Strike." IFTUK celebrated three female film makers in 2024 and gave Maeve and Silent Grace a special Directors Q&A screening at the ICA along with her short St Pancras Sunrise. They called Silent Grace a "landmark" Troubles film.
