= Beyond the Fire =

2009 film by Maeve Murphy

- Theatrical poster
- Directed by: Maeve Murphy
- Written by: Maeve Murphy
- Produced by: Dean Silvers; Helen Alexander; Maeve Murphy; Frank Mannion; Marlen Hect
- Starring: Scot Williams; Cara Seymour
- Cinematography: Mattias Nyberg
- Edited by: Agnieszka Liggett
- Music by: Neel Dhorajiwala; Colm Ó'Snodaigh
- Release date: 17 June 2009
- Running time: 77 minutes
- Country: United Kingdom
- Language: English

Beyond the Fire, Northern Irish screenwriter and film director Maeve Murphy's second feature, was an award winning film about love in the wake of sexual assault starring Cara Seymour and Scot Williams. The film was first selected and screened at New British Cinema season at the ICA. Peter Bradshaw of The Guardian wrote "its unironic belief in the power of love is attractive". It was directed and written by Maeve Murphy. David Parkinson in Empire On Line Festivals and Seasons wrote, "Murphy confirms the good impression she made with Silent Grace... the performances of Williams and Seymour seep raw emotion."

== Plot ==
Beyond the Fire tells the story of Sheamy and Katie. Sheamy is a gentle but troubled Irish ex-priest who arrives in London to find his old family friend and mentor Father Brendan. Katie is a warm hearted woman with her own emotional scars. After arriving in London, Sheamy tries to make contact with Father Brendan. As he is not at home when he calls, he contacts the only other person he knows in London, Rory, a distant relative by marriage. Rory is a musician and band member and, after meeting Sheamy at a gig (where Sheamy makes a good first impression on Katie, who manages the band), offers him a bed and introduces him more fully to Katie, his flatmate. There is an immediate and obvious attraction between Sheamy and Katie. The film follows their attempts to form a lasting relationship despite both their pasts continuing to haunt them.

== Cast ==
- Scot Williams as Sheamy O'Brien
- Cara Seymour as Katie
- Victoria Aitken as Amy
- Alison Cain as Lisa
- Brett Findlay as Paul
- Hugh Sachs as Father Brendan

== Awards ==
- Winner of Best International Feature at Garden State Film Festival 2010
- Winner of Best UK Feature at London Independent Film Festival 2009
- Official Selection Belfast Film Festival 2009

== TV broadcasts ==
Beyond The Fire had its UK TV premier on BBC 2 on 22 March 2013 as well as being made available on BBC iPlayer where it was in the 'most popular' section for two weeks and was critically acclaimed by TV critics. It was Top film Tips "8 Best TV Movies of the Week" on the Sabotage Times. It also received a 5 star listing from My TV Guide Listing UK. Beyond The Fire was also broadcast in the Republic of Ireland on 7 April 2010 on TV3. There was press controversy about the film in The Irish Independent regarding RTE's decision not to acquire it due to feeling there was "no appetite for the subject matter". Victims of religious sexual abuse expressed their concern in The Irish Independent. TV3 stepped in and it was instantly broadcast across Ireland. The organisation One in Four supported the film with press relations. The film continues to be written about and reviewed positively.
