= Taking Stock =

- Directed by: Maeve Murphy
- Release date: October 4, 2015 (Raindance Film Festival)

Taking Stock is a 2015 independent caper film written and directed by Maeve Murphy and starring Kelly Brook. It was shot on location in Kings Cross, London in homage to The Ladykillers. Some interior scenes were shot in Crystal Palace, London. The film tackles the issue of redundancy and unemployment in a lighthearted way, as Kate fantasises about robbing the shop that has just made her redundant.

Taking Stock is based on Murphy's award-winning short film Sushi, which was shown at the 2011 Venice Film Festival.

Taking Stock premièred 4 October 2015 at the Raindance Film Festival and Swipe Films Distribution released it theatrically across the UK in key cities on 5 February 2016.

Taking Stock was released online on 21 June 2016. Google Play made it "Staff Pick" Popular Independent new releases and the film was bought and released by Netflix and featured in the top three on the front page "Popular on Netflix" section.

== Plot ==
Suddenly made redundant and at rock bottom, Kate takes control by revealing her inner bad girl.

Kate (played by Kelly Brook) is an out of work actress who is working in a shop. Until she gets made redundant, that is. In a week from hell, Kate's boyfriend leaves her, the shop goes bust and much to her dismay, rent and gas bills have not been paid. Inspired by Bonnie Parker, Kate gathers a rag tag gang from her young shop assistant friends and comes up with a plot to rob the shop. But where is her Clyde?

== Cast ==
- Kelly Brook as Kate
- Georgia Groome as Kelly
- Jay Brown as Nick
- Femi Oyeniran as Sponge
- Scot Williams as Mat
- Lorna Brown as Christina
- Junichi Kajioka as Yoichi

== Reception ==
The film received mostly warm reviews, notably from The Huffington Post, MCMbuzz, and Rich Cline of Shadows on the Wall. Mark Kermode in The Observer marked out praise for Maeve Murphy as a writer-director.

MTV championed the film at its premiere at the Raindance Film Festival, predicting that it could be a festival award winner and an indie success. Google Play made it their "staff pick" popular independent new releases.

== Awards ==
Taking Stock won eight international Film Festival Awards.

- Monaco International Film Festival December 2015
- Taking Stock directed by Maeve Murphy Winner of the Independent Spirit Award
- Taking Stock Winner of Best Cinematography Gerry Vasbenter
- Taking Stock Winner of Best Supporting Actor Junichi Kajioka
- Taking Stock Winner of Best Producer, Maeve Murphy, Frank Mannion, Richard Yetzes
- Garden State Film Festival USA March 2016
- Taking Stock Winner of the Bud Abbott Award for Feature Length comedy, recipient Director Maeve Murphy and Producer Geoff Austin
- Wind International Film Festival USA July 2016
- Winner Best Female Filmmaker (Director - Writer) in the comedy section, Maeve Murphy for Taking Stock
- Winner Best Supporting Actor in the comedy section, Junichi Kajioka as Yoichi in Taking Stock
- Sochi International Film Festival and Awards Russia December 2016
- Winner of the President's Award, director Maeve Murphy for Taking Stock
