= Michael Barrett (cinematographer) =

American cinematographer (born 1970)

- Born: Michael Bradley Barrett; May 28, 1970 (age 56); Riverside, California, U.S.
- Education: University of California, Los Angeles (BA); Columbia University (MFA)
- Occupation: cinematographer
- Years active: 1996–2018
- Spouse: Anna Faris (m. 2021)
- Website: www.michaelbarrettasc.com

Michael Bradley Barrett (born May 28, 1970) is an American cinematographer.

== Career ==
In 1992, Barrett met the cinematographer Gabriel Figueroa and talked to him about Figueroa's work for the 1947 film La Perla, an encounter Barrett considered a pivotal moment in his career plans. He earned a bachelor's degree in art from University of California, Los Angeles and a Master of Fine Arts in film from Columbia University.

Starting in 2001 Barrett worked for the TV series CSI: Crime Scene Investigation. In 2002 he received an ASC Award for Outstanding Achievement in Cinematography in the category "Movie of the Week or Pilot (Network)" for his work on the CSI pilot "Cross Jurisdictions". In 2006, his work on Bobby was selected for the main competition at the Camerimage Festival. In 2008, Barrett was a member of the jury of the Camerimage Polish Films Competition.

Since 2012, Barrett has worked primarily with digital movie cameras. Barrett is an active member of the American Society of Cinematographers (ASC).

== Personal life ==
In February 2020, actress Anna Faris confirmed that she and Barrett had got engaged. In July 2021, Faris revealed on her podcast that she and Barrett had married at a courthouse on San Juan Island in Washington.

== Filmography ==
=== Short film ===
Year	Title	Director
1996	Ticket to Ride	Maria Essen
1997	Face	Bertha Bay-Sa Pan
1998	Cookin'	Micky Hohl
2000	Changing Directions	Maria Essen
2008	Prop 8 - The Musical	Adam Shankman

=== Feature film ===
Director

- Temple (2017)

Cinematographer

Year	Title	Director	Notes
1998	Finding North	Tanya Wexler	
1998	Safe Men	John Hamburg	
1999	The Suburbans	Donal Lardner Ward	
2000	75 Degrees in July	Hyatt Bass	
2000	Hide	Sooz Hewitt	With Robert Barocci
2002	Crazy Little Thing	Matthew Miller	
2002	Lone Star State of Mind	David Semel	
2002	Turn of Faith	Charles Jarrott	
2005	Kiss Kiss Bang Bang	Shane Black	
2005	Goal!	Danny Cannon	
2005	Lucky 13	Chris Hall	
2006	Bobby	Emilio Estevez	
2008	The Mysteries of Pittsburgh	Rawson Marshall Thurber	
2008	You Don't Mess with the Zohan	Dennis Dugan	
2008	Bedtime Stories	Adam Shankman	
2010	Takers	John Luessenhop	
2010	Everything Must Go	Dan Rush	
2011	Bucky Larson: Born to Be a Star	Tom Brady	
2011	Zookeeper	Frank Coraci	
2011	A Very Harold & Kumar Christmas	Todd Strauss-Schulson	
2012	Ted	Seth MacFarlane	
2013	Battle of the Year	Benson Lee	
2014	About Last Night	Steve Pink	
2014	A Million Ways to Die in the West	Seth MacFarlane	
2014	No Good Deed	Sam Miller	
2015	Ted 2	Seth MacFarlane	
2017	The Clapper	Dito Montiel	
2018	Beast of Burden	Jesper Ganslandt	
2018	Overboard	Rob Greenberg	
2018	Gotti	Kevin Connolly	
2018	Night Hunter	David Raymond	Also credited as co-producer

=== Television ===
TV movies

Year	Title	Director	Notes
2001	On the Edge	Helen Mirren	Segment "Happy Birthday"
2001	The Atlantis Conspiracy	Dean Silvers	

TV series

Year	Title	Director	Notes
2001–2004	CSI: Crime Scene Investigation		31 episodes
2004	CSI: Miami	Karen Gaviola; Scott Lautanen; Steven DePaul	5 episodes
2005–2006	Close to Home	Karen Gaviola; Steven DePaul; Helen Shaver; Emilio Estevez; Martha Mitchell	5 episodes
2008	Welcome to The Captain	John Hamburg	Episode "Pilot"
2015	Supergirl	Glen Winter	Episode "Pilot"
2015	Blood & Oil	Jonas Pate; Rod Holcomb; Mikael Salomon; Michael Nankin	3 episodes
