= Rocco Gardner =

British businessman (born 1979)

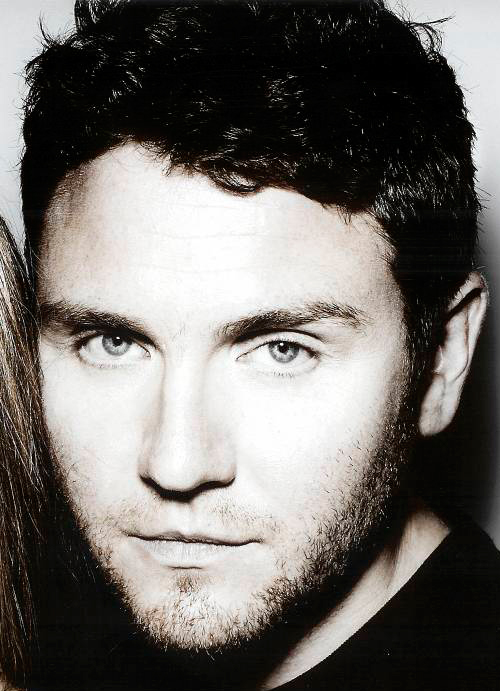
- Born: 1979 (age 46–47); London, England
- Education: University of Bristol
- Occupations: Entrepreneur, musician
- Website: www.esca.pe

Rocco “Roc” (born Roland) Gardner is a British entrepreneur and musician based in Las Vegas, Nevada. He is the owner of the experiential brand Escape and a production company, Escape Productions LLC in New York City.

== Background ==
He was born in 1979 in London, England. He is the godson of the late Jaime Ortiz-Patino, owner of Valderrama Golf Club and grandson of Simón Iturri Patiño, The Tin King.

== Early career ==
Gardner grew up playing the piano from an early age, giving rise to his career as a performing musician and music industry businessman.

In 2004, while touring Europe with his band Chiller, he founded Sidewalk 7 Ltd. in the United Kingdom. At the time described by The Times as the next Richard Branson, Gardner initially created Sidewalk 7 as a company to act as the vehicle for his projects and creative ventures. It expanded to a record label, an artist management company and event production agency. Sidewalk 7 Limited released over thirty titles internationally and successfully managed campaigns on behalf of artists both at home and abroad in the United States, eventually taking the company and its CEO to New York City in 2009.

== Escape ==
In 2009, Gardner founded Escape Productions LLC, starting with an experiential music festival called "Escape to New York".

=== Escape to Festivals ===
- Escape to New York, in collaboration with the UK's Secret Garden Party, on the Shinnecock Reservation (August 2011) with Patti Smith, Edward Sharpe & The Magnetic Zeros headlining.
- Escape LA in Palm Springs (April 2012) with Thom Yorke headlining.
- Escape to Montauk in Montauk, New York (August 2012) with Albert Hammond JR headlining.

=== ESCAPE (Recording Complex) ===
Escape's west coast headquarters is based 100 miles east of Los Angeles, a private 140-acre ranch and recording complex on the outskirts of Pioneertown, California situated near Palm Springs and the renowned music venue Pappy & Harriet's. It is approximately 15 miles from Joshua Tree National Park. It functions as a creative center and recording complex for musicians, photographers and artists as well serving as a respite from modern-day living. Escape houses a state-of-the-art music recording studio and provides a desert landscape for photos shoots. Escape has been visited by major label artists The Arctic Monkeys, Paolo Nutini, Rufus du Sol, 5SOS, Billy Gibbons, Diplo, Jan Blomqvist, Bob Moses, MK, Joe Ray of Nero, Shigeto, The Pierces, Eagles of Death Metal, Peaches, the Smirnoff Sound Collective, and author Neil Strauss. The ranch has also hosted shoots with Johnny Depp and Dior as well as magazines such as Vogue and Glamour.

== Charity and community work ==
=== Escape for Good ===
In 2012, Gardner created the Escape for Good series in partnership with New York marketing firm Sunshine Sachs. It is a charity race over 36 hours where contestants travel with no money in support of their favourite cause. The race took place in 2012, 2013, and 2014.

=== Tile House Project ===
In 2017, Gardner placed 18,000 tiles on a Venice residential property with New York artist FAILE as a mark of unity within the Venice Community. FAILE House was nominated for House of the Year by the Wall Street Journal at the end of 2020.

== Career ==
=== Musician ===
- Chillher (1998–2004) Keyboards. In band with UK recording artist Ben Montague. First record was recorded at Freddie Mercury and Roger Taylor's studio The Mill (home of Queen). Then recorded with Mike Rutherford (Genesis) in Sussex. Opened for Ringo Starr in 2003.
- "The Blue Eyed Shark Experiment" (2009–2012) Solo Album Project. Appeared on own record as ROC, released via Universal and Sidewalk 7 Ltd. The music video for Shark's first single "JetPlane" shot with Spun movie writer Creighton Vero in Sunland, California. It was executive produced by ROC.
- "Your New Crush" (2013). Recording as ROC with Kelly Halloran and David Catching (Eagles of Death Metal, Earthlings?) and produced by Mathias Schneeberger.
- "Hope in Grace" (2017/2018). Recording as ROC with Kelly Halloran. Produced by Stefan Skarbek, Engineer James Krausse, Mix by Henry Krinkle.
- "Don't Resist!" (2023). Recording as ROC with appearances from Jason Bowman, Dallas Austin, Naz Tokio and Joseph Ray of Nero. “DON’T RESIST!” is slated for release in August 2023, produced by Jean Michel LaPointe and Grammy award-winning engineer Mick Gazauski.
