= Maeve Murphy =

Irish director and screenwriter

- Born: Belfast, Northern Ireland, UK
- Occupation: Writer/Director
- Website: www.maevemurphy.net

Maeve Murphy is an Irish director-screenwriter. In 2011, as director for her short film Sushi, she won the Sub-ti short film competition, co-judged by Venice Days, Venice Film Festival. In 2020, the Irish Times listed Murphy's Silent Grace as no 38 in their 50 Best Irish Films Ever Made. Silent Grace had previously been selected to represent the UK at Cannes but couldn't show as it had shown in the market. Maeve wrote and directed the St Pancras Sunrise short which was executive produced by Jim Sheridan. Part inspired by ECP's church occupation it won 8 awards internationally. In 2024 it was long listed on the British Short Film Awards and in 2025 Maeve was nominated Best Director for it at the European Short Film Awards. Maeve was also short listed for the Jack Gold Prize for Best Direction at Fastnet Film Festival for short film The Wolf in 2026.

== Early life ==
Murphy was born in Belfast in Northern Ireland. As a teenager, she was one of the hosts of BBC Northern Ireland's youth TV series Wise Crack. While at Cambridge University, she was the secretary of the Cambridge Footlights and a co-founding member of "Trouble and Strife" theatre company.

== Early work ==
Murphy's first short was Amazing Grace, with Aidan Gillen, was screened at the BFI. Her second short Salvage, starring Orla Brady, premiered at the Cork Film Festival.

Silent Grace, was a prison/hunger strike/women's protest drama starring Brady, Cathleen Bradley, Cara Seymour, Patrick Bergin and Conor Mullen. Silent Grace was chosen as UK entry for Cannes for Un Certain Regard Section in 2002. The film screened at the Galway, Moscow Film Festival, Taormina and the Hamptons Film Festival, USA, where it was nominated for the Conflict and Resolution Award in association with the Brizzolara Family Foundation. The film was positively reviewed by Ronnie Scheib in Variety and by Michael Dwyer in the Irish Times. Silent Grace is a fictional drama based on real events, covering the largely untold story of Republican women prisoners’ involvement in the Dirty protests and first Hunger Strikes of 1980/1981. Guerilla Films released it via UGC cinemas in London, Belfast and Dublin in 2004, and it was supported by the Irish Film Board. Silent Grace achieved 80% rating on Rotten Tomatoes. It was picked up for international online streaming on Hulu and Mubi.

On 24 June 2017, 16 years after its film festival premiere and following two articles in the Irish Times about women's voices, TV3 gave Silent Grace its Irish nationwide TV première. The Sunday Times made it one of the "Films of the Week." and The Irish Times said "Silent Grace is important". In May 2020, the Irish Times listed Silent Grace as number 38 in their list of the 50 greatest Irish films of all time. In June 2021, the Irish Film Institute put it on their IFI international online collection and BFI Player added it to their Woman with a Movie Camera Collection in 2022.

Beyond The Fire, her second feature film, was about love in the wake of sexual assault starring Cara Seymour and Scot Williams. She won Best UK Feature at the London Independent Film Festival 2009 and Best International Feature at the Garden State Film Festival USA 2010. It was selected for the Belfast Film Festival and the ICA New British Cinema season. It was released in cinema by Met Film Distribution and had a London, Belfast, Dublin cinema release, supported by UKFC in 2009 and 2010. Peter Bradshaw of The Guardian said "its heartfelt, unironic belief in the power of love is attractive." There was press controversy about the film in the Irish Independent regarding RTÉ's decision not to acquire it due to the feeling there was "no appetite for the subject matter". Victims of religious sexual abuse expressed their concern. TV3 then stepped in and it was broadcast across Ireland in April 2010 and May 2010. In 2011 Beyond the Fire was sold to the BBC for UK TV transmission by Frank Mannion of Swipe Films. It was subsequently broadcast on BBC2 on 22 March 2013 and also made available on BBC iPlayer. It was one of "Best 8 TV Movies of the Week" in The Sabotage Times.

Murphy won the Sub-ti International short film Award 2011 for her comedy drama short Sushi, starring Luanna Priestman and Junichi Kajioka.

Taking Stock, starring Kelly Brook and Scot Williams, an austerity comedy caper feature was based on Sushi. It was selected for its UK premiere by the 2015 Raindance Film Festival and for the 2015 Monaco International Film Festival where it won four awards: Independent Spirit Award: Taking Stock directed by Murphy; Best Supporting Actor; Best Producer; Best Cinematography. Taking Stock showed at the 2016 Garden State Film Festival where the film and Murphy and producer Geoff Austin won the Bud Abbott Award for feature-length comedy. The film also showed at the WIND International Film Festival in LA where Murphy won the award for best female director in the comedy section. Also, Junichi Kajioka won the award for best supporting actor. Swipe Films released the film in UK cinemas in 2016. It was on UK/Irl Netflix 2016-2018.

Siobhan was a ghost/rape-revenge 2017 short film written and directed by Murphy. It won the award of excellence in the One Reeler Short film competition in LA and the award for Best Music which was composed by David Long. Film critic Rich Cline in Shadows on The Wall said it was "beautifully shot...its darkly moving. And also eerily provocative."

== Middle work ==
During 2018-2020 Murphy wrote a feature film screenplay with Victoria Mary Clarke about the life/love story of Victoria and Shane MacGowan.

Murphy wrote "Christmas at the Cross", a short story which was published in the Irish Times on Christmas Eve 2019 and reached No. 3 in their Culture Top 10 Most Read. On 26 December 2020 the Irish Times published 'The Little Statue', part two of the 'Christmas at the Cross' story. It is a novella in four parts about a young Irish woman holed up in a red light area of London who becomes friends with a local prostitute. It was published by Bridge House Publishing in October 2021. The Irish Times review said 'it was a short, sharp read that packed a punch'. Film maker Jim Sheridan said "This is a book about women who have had enough...you will be astonished by Maeve's riveting tale."

In 2024 Maeve wrote, directed and produced St Pancras Sunrise a short film based on real events and her novella "Christmas at the Cross". A proof of concept for a feature version in development with Tile Media for Screen Ireland and Northern Ireland Screen. A work in progress of the short showed at the ICA's IFTUK St Patrick's Festival. It stars Emma Eliza Regan, Frankie Wilson, Sibylla Meienberg and Orla Brady. It premièred on July 12, 2024 at the Ischia Film Festival where Maeve as director/writer and Jim Sheridan as executive producer did a short talk afterwards. The short film then screened as part of official selection at the Belfast, Catalyst, Fastnet, Irish Film London and Raindance Film Festival. It has won 8 awards internationally including, Best International Short Film at the Silicon Beach Film Festival in LA, Awarded Honorable Mention at London Breeze Film Festival, Winner Best Short at the London International Screenwriters Film Festival. Winner Best Short Short at City of Lights Film Festival. Maeve was also long listed Best Director for it at the British Short Film Awards. The murder of Patsy Malone a Kings Cross sex worker by a serving Met police officer in London in 1981 also inspired the short film. This has been noted in by media. Film Ireland named it a "break out success" and praised its "electric immediacy". Critic Amanny Mo said it "packed a punch, resonates with today...a heart wrenching short film". Maeve was nominated Best Director at the European Short Film Awards 2025.

On June 6 2026 "The Geography of Violence" triptych had its European Première at La Femme Film Festival Europe, Hungary. Siobhan, St Pancras Sunrise short and The Wolf were brought together in a 30 minute cumulative feminist humanist film showing violence against women shifting continuously across different landscapes, rural, urban/institutional and in the home and the women's responses. The third film "The Wolf", directed by Maeve Murphy and written/starring Kellie Shirley about domestic violence completed the trilogy. Murphy was short listed for the Jack Gold Prize for Best Direction for The Wolf and Shirley for Best Actor at 2026 Fastnet Film Festival. A clip was broadcast on Sunday Brunch on Channel 4. The "Geography of Violence" triptych received praise and extensive discussion in Film Ireland. Maeve won the best director award for The Wolf at The Rolling International Film Festival, she also won the Yes She Cannes Impact Spotlight Award for The Wolf.
