= The Bad Mother's Handbook =

- The Bad Mother's Handbook DVD Cover
- Starring: Catherine Tate; Anne Reid; Holly Grainger; Robert Pattinson
- Theme music composer: Mark Russell
- Country of origin: United Kingdom
- Original language: English
- No. of episodes: 1

Production
- Executive producers: Hugo Heppell; Alison Owen
- Producers: Harry Oulton; Sascha Schneider
- Running time: 90 minutes
- Production companies: Ingenious Broadcasting; Ruby Television

Original release
- Network: ITV
- Release: 19 February 2007

The Bad Mother's Handbook is a one-off television drama film based on the novel The Bad Mother's Handbook by Kate Long. It was broadcast on ITV on 19 February 2007, starring Catherine Tate, Anne Reid, Holly Grainger and Robert Pattinson. According to BARB, the show received strong viewing figures of 6.09 million.

== Plot ==
Karen is a mother in her thirties, raising teenaged Charlotte. Karen's mother, Nan, is suffering from Alzheimer's disease. Charlotte becomes pregnant by her boyfriend. However, he rejects his fatherly responsibility. As her due date draws near, Charlotte grows closer to her nerdy classmate, Daniel.

== Cast ==
- Catherine Tate as Karen Cooper
- Anne Reid as Nancy Hesketh
- Holly Grainger as Charlotte "Charlie" Cooper
- Steve John Shepherd as Steve Cooper
- Steve Pemberton as Leo Fairbrother
- Robert Pattinson as Daniel Gale
- Maggie Ollerenshaw as Jessie Pilkington
- Oliver Lee (actor) as Paul Benthem
- Pip Torrens as Doctor Gale
- Caroline Harding as Sandra Gale

== American remake ==
In 2008, ABC was developing a pilot known as Bad Mother's Handbook to star Alicia Silverstone, Megan Mullally and Alia Shawkat, but it was not picked up.

== The DVD Release ==
The film was released on 24 August 2010.
