= Kimberly Hart-Simpson =

British actress and businesswoman (born 1987)

- Born: 28 May 1987 (age 39); Rhyl, Wales, United Kingdom
- Education: Rhyl High School; Oldham College; Italia Conti Academy of Theatre Arts
- Occupations: Actress; businesswoman
- Years active: 2009–present
- Television: Coronation Street; Celebs Go Dating: The Mansion

Kimberly Hart-Simpson (born 28 May 1987) is a British actress and businesswoman from Rhyl, Wales, known for portraying the role of Nicky Wheatley in the ITV soap opera Coronation Street. As well as being the founder of the fashion company Hart-Work, she has also appeared in the E4 reality series Celebs Go Dating: The Mansion.

== Early and personal life ==
Hart-Simpson was born on 28 May 1987 in Rhyl. Her father, who died in 2007, was an English drummer from Oldham, and her mother is Welsh. Growing up, she attended Rhyl High School. When she was 16, Hart-Simpson and her family then relocated to Oldham, where she attended Oldham College. From 2006 to 2009, she trained at the Italia Conti Academy of Theatre Arts. Prior to acting professionally, Hart-Simpson worked in various jobs, including being a manager at a McDonald's restaurant in Oldham, working at Fitness First, a seamstress of stage decorations, and an architectural company in Hyde. While working at the architectural company, she drove from Stockport to Ibiza alone using their van. The van broke down, and she stayed abroad for a season, also visiting Dubai. She stated that the road trip changed her "outlook on life", as the year away from acting allowed her to be happy in her personal life. She explained that this benefitted her professional career, stating: "When you audition it's less about that moment on tape - they want to see the personality of the person they’re going to work with and I think that's really important."

In 2018, Hart-Simpson founded a fashion company, Hart-Work. In 2020, in an interview on Lorraine, she came out as bisexual. She explained that a year prior, she designed a rainbow-themed dress for actress Jessica Ellis for the British Soap Awards. She said: "we were representing the LGBTQ community and I'm part of that as well. I represent the B. So for me to do that was really, really important." In January 2021, Hart-Simpson stated that she is pansexual. She stated that everybody is on a "different spectrum" and that gender is "irrelevant" to her when dating, and added that when adjusting her Tinder preferences to display men and women, she was worried that somebody she knew would find her, but later realised "it would mean they were gay too".

== Career ==
Hart-Simpson made her television debut in the Sky series Mount Pleasant as Chantelle, a guest role she portrayed for two episodes. Then in 2017, she appeared in the Channel 4 soap opera Hollyoaks as Davina, a firefighter. She appeared in Hollyoaks again in 2020 as Beverly, a landlord. Later in 2020, she was cast in the ITV soap opera Coronation Street as Nicky Wheatley. Prior to being cast as Nicky, Hart-Simpson had auditioned for the roles of Maddie Heath, Lolly and various minor roles, all of which were unsuccessful. She later made the decision to tell her agent not to submit her for minor roles on the soap, stating that she would do minor parts on any other series, but with Coronation Street, she wanted the role to be "substantial". She expressed her joy at being cast in the soap, revealing that her father's last words were "Just do me a favour and get in Corrie love." In 2021, she appeared in the E4 reality series Celebs Go Dating: The Mansion. Later that year, she announced that she would be returning to Coronation Street in 2022.

== Filmography ==
Year	Title	Role	Notes
2016	Mount Pleasant	Chantelle	2 episodes
2017, 2020	Hollyoaks	Davina / Beverly	3 episodes
2020, 2022, 2024	Coronation Street	Nicky Wheatley	Regular role
2021	Celebs Go Dating: The Mansion	Herself	Main cast
2023	Brassic	Andrea	1 episode
