= Nicola Duffett =

English actress (born 1963)

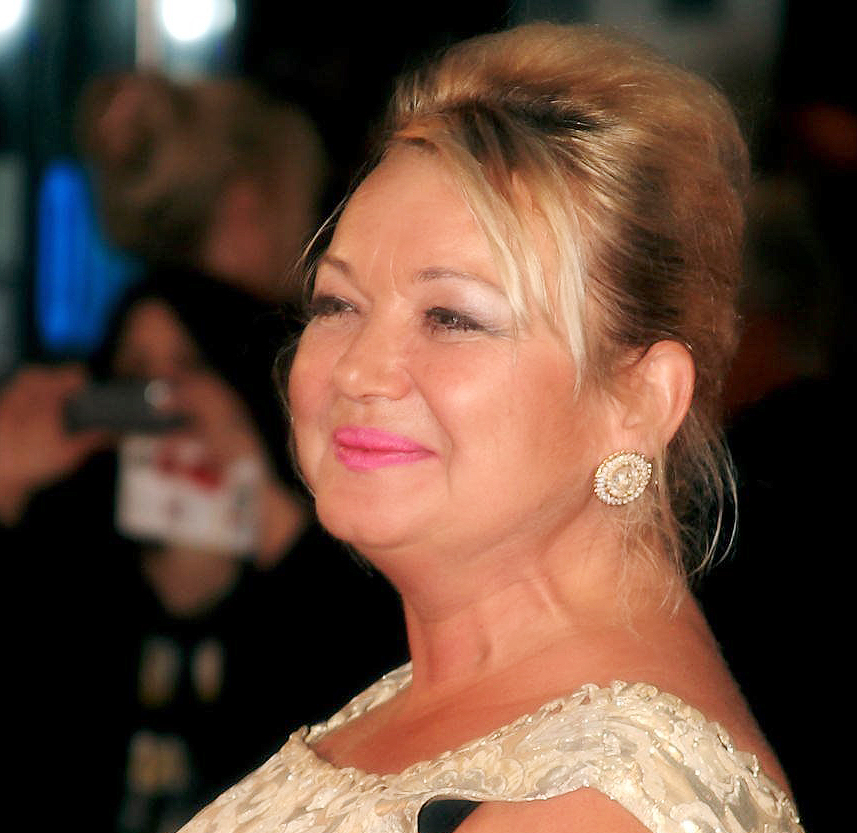
- Duffett in 2010
- Born: Nicola T. P. Duffett; 22 January 1963 (age 63); Portsmouth, Hampshire, England
- Occupation: Actress
- Years active: 1990–present
- Spouses: Andrew C. Easton; Ian Henderson; Shane Williams
- Children: 3

Nicola Duffett (born 22 January 1963) is an English actress. She is known for her roles as Debbie Bates on EastEnders and Cat MacKenzie on Family Affairs.

== Career ==
Duffett had a supporting role in the Oscar-winning film Howards End (1992) by James Ivory. She is known for two long-running soap opera roles. After appearing as Debbie Bates in EastEnders from 1993 to 1995, she went into the role of boozy floozie Cat Matthews in Family Affairs. Cat first appeared in Family Affairs in late 1998, and was a key character in the show's story lines until the series ended in December 2005. She has appeared on stage in Simon Gray's Simply Disconnected at Chichester Festival Theatre; as Titania in A Midsummer Night's Dream and Helen of Troy in Troilus and Cressida at the Open Air Theatre, Regent's Park; and in Coming Up by James Martin Charlton at the Warehouse Theatre.

Duffett also took part in the reality series Celebrity Fit Club, and appeared as Bronwen Jones in an episode of Torchwood titled "Random Shoes". In 2016, she appeared in the BBC series The Coroner episode 2.4 "The Beast of Lighthaven" as Amy Penketh. In 2018, she starred in the BBC Two drama Collateral. She then appeared in the ITV drama series Deep Water in 2019. In July 2020, it was announced that Duffett would appear in the ITV soap opera Coronation Street as Lucie Fernsby.

Duffet made a brief return to EastEnders in the episode that aired on 23 December 2025, appearing as a vision in Debbie's husband Nigel's dementia storyline.
