= Hard Cell =

English mockumentary sitcom streaming television series

- Genre: Mockumentary; Sitcom; Comedy verite
- Created by: Catherine Tate
- Written by: Catherine Tate; Niky Wardley; Alex Carter
- Directed by: Catherine Tate; James Kayler
- Starring: Catherine Tate; Christian Brassington; Niky Wardley; Cheryl Fergison; Jola Olajide; Peter Singh
- Music by: Adem Ilhan
- Country of origin: United Kingdom
- Original language: English
- No. of episodes: 6

Production
- Executive producers: Kristian Smith; Catherine Tate
- Producer: Jennie Fava
- Cinematography: Greg Duffield
- Editor: Lucien Clayton
- Running time: 24–27 minutes
- Production company: Leopard Pictures

Original release
- Network: Netflix
- Release: 12 April 2022

Hard Cell is a British mockumentary sitcom television series created, co-written and co-directed by Catherine Tate, who also plays six of the main characters. The series premiered on 12 April 2022 on Netflix, and consists of six episodes. In June 2023, Tate confirmed that Netflix had officially cancelled the series after one season, which Tate found out about through someone else's agent.

== Plot ==
The series follows UK prison governor Laura Willis (Catherine Tate) who firmly believes that creativity leads to rehabilitation and plans to put on a musical, starring inmates and directed by ex-EastEnders star Cheryl Fergison. During the six-week rehearsals, the inmates find their voices, build self-confidence and strengthen their friendships.

== Cast and characters ==
=== Main ===
- Catherine Tate as Laura / Ros / Ange / Big Viv / Marco / Anne Marie
- Christian Brassington as Dean
- Cheryl Fergison as Herself
- Niky Wardley as Anastasia
- Jola Olajide as Charlee
- Peter Singh as Gary

=== Recurring ===
- Lisa Davina Phillip as Pat Pat
- Melissa James as Cathy With The Hat
- Suzie Chard as No Hat Cathy
- Stacey Guthrie as Thick As Shit Jean
- Lorna Brown as Cal
- Caroline Harding as Sal
- Dystin Johnson as Vicki
- Bruce Alexander as Doug
- Catherine Morris as Sian
- Irene Alano-Rhodes as Suds
- Edie Newman as Blind Sally
- Donna Preston as Fat Pat
- Rae Cooksey as White Pat
- Marina Hayter as Gormless Madge
- Jane Mosse as Pretend Parker Bowles
- Abdul Salis as Sebastian
- Duncan Wisbey as Martin
- Elisabeth Wilson as Scouse Fi
- Andy Wood as Tom Jones Lookalike
- Daniel Hawksford as Ioan
- Jumoké Fashola as Mama Dede
- Rachael Hilton as Nurse Allison
- Tonya Smith as Sian's Sister
- Alys Hedd Jones and Mabli Wyn Jones as Sians's Kids

== Episodes ==
No.	Title	Directed by	Written by	Original release date
1	"Episode 1"	Catherine Tate & James Kayler	Catherine Tate & Niky Wardley & Alex Carter	12 April 2022
Governor Laura Willis announces an inmate-led production of West Side Story as newcomer Ange arrives at the prison.
2	"Episode 2"	Catherine Tate & James Kayler	Catherine Tate & Niky Wardley & Alex Carter	12 April 2022
A plumbing accident causes absolute anarchy in HMP Woldsley and threatens to disrupt the production of the musical.
3	"Episode 3"	Catherine Tate & James Kayler	Catherine Tate & Niky Wardley & Alex Carter	12 April 2022
While Ros is scamming her penpal boyfriend, the other inmates are reunited with their loved ones on visiting day.
4	"Episode 4"	Catherine Tate & James Kayler	Catherine Tate & Niky Wardley & Alex Carter	12 April 2022
Rehearsals continue with all-new material as Ros receives an unexpected visitor. Meanwhile, Laura recruits help to better communicate with an inmate.
5	"Episode 5"	Catherine Tate & James Kayler	Catherine Tate & Niky Wardley & Alex Carter	12 April 2022
After a whirlwind romance, two inmates find it hard to go their separate ways when one is being released from prison.
6	"Episode 6"	Catherine Tate & James Kayler	Catherine Tate & Niky Wardley & Alex Carter	12 April 2022
When the long-awaited premiere of the musical is right around the corner, Laura is being sued and has to handle a medical emergency. Ange says goodbye to the inmates after all charges against her are dropped.

== Production ==
On 30 June 2021, it was announced that Catherine Tate would write, direct and star in a six-part Netflix comedy set in a fictional women's prison with Argonon's drama unit Leopard Pictures producing. Executive producer Kristian Smith described the series as "funny and touching all at once, revealing what life might be like in a British women's correctional facility". Donna Preston announced her involvement in the series the next day. On 30 July, Deadline shared the news that Tate's co-stars will include Christian Brassington as Dean, Niky Wardley as Anastasia, Lorna Brown as Cal, Caroline Harding as Sal, Jola Olajide as Charlee and Duncan Wisbey as Martin. Wardley and Alex Carter (who previously starred in The Catherine Tate Show Australian and New Zealand live tour) were also confirmed to be parts of the creative team behind the series.

== Reception ==
On the review aggregator website Rotten Tomatoes, 18% of 11 critics' reviews are positive, with an average rating of 4.8/10. Metacritic, which uses a weighted average, assigned a score of 38 out of 100, based on four critics, indicating "generally unfavorable reviews".

Gabriel Tate of The Telegraph criticised the series for being dated. Rachel Aroesti of The Guardian criticised the series for a lack of plot and "an abundance of one-dimensional characters". James Hibbs of Radio Times criticised the series for immature jokes, but noted it gets better over time.

Nicole Vassell of The Independent noted that the series has fared better with general audiences, as the audience Rotten Tomatoes score is 88% positive. Many have especially praised the dramatic and shocking ending of the series. Speaking about the open ending and the possibility of a second series, Catherine Tate said: "I'm quite a big fan of things ending with loose ends. I think that's sort of life, isn't it? Life doesn't tie itself up in a neat bow. And so I'd be delighted if it got another series, and I'm happy for it to stand alone".
