= The Atlantis Conspiracy =

2001 television film directed by Dean Silvers

- Written by: Dean Silvers
- Directed by: Dean Silvers
- Starring: Amanda Donohoe; Jeremy Davies; Bill Sage; Adrienne Shelly
- Music by: Stephen Endelman
- Country of origin: United States
- Original language: English

Production
- Producers: Dean Silvers; Marlen Hecht; Klaus Volkenborn
- Cinematography: Michael Barrett
- Editors: Marlen Hecht; Merril Stern

Original release
- Network: HBO
- Release: 2001

The Atlantis Conspiracy is a 2001 HBO/ZDF film that was written and directed by Dean Silvers and starring Amanda Donohoe, Jeremy Davies, Bill Sage, and Adrienne Shelly. Filming took place in New York.

The film is also known as Rock the Boat.

== Premise ==
Lauren Marcus reluctantly moves back to New York City, and is forced to decide whether she wants to reconnect with the life she abruptly left behind. When a mystery stemming from a suicide draws her in, she and two friends, a young bookie and a cynical federal agent, seek to uncover the truth.

== Cast ==
- Amanda Donohoe as Lauren Marcus
- Jeremy Davies as Flush
- Bill Sage as Jon
- Paul Calderon as Guy
- Adrienne Shelly as Samantha
- Danton Stone as Barry
- Peter McRobbie as Mr. Dombrowski
- Glenn Fitzgerald as Patient
- Forrest Silvers as Eco-Ranger
- Tyler Silvers as Eco-Ranger

== Reception ==
In a negative review, Monica Sullivan wrote: "The presence of Amanda Donohoe in any picture, however tiny the budget, immediately makes the movie seem several times more expensive than it actually is." Regarding the presence of the actress in the film, "Mr Skin" wrote: " By the dawning of the new millennium, the thirty-eight-year-old sizzler was letting those scalding cupfuls overflow in The Atlantis Conspiracy [...]. No covert operation with Amanda, what you see is what you get—and you get a lot!" Filmdienst, however, described the film as follows: "A gripping eco-drama about the struggle for ideals and power, showing how visionary goals fall victim to unscrupulous profiteering. A committed independent production with convincing actors."
