= Mark Margolis =

American actor (1939–2023)

- Born: November 26, 1939; Philadelphia, Pennsylvania, U.S.
- Died: August 3, 2023 (aged 83); New York City, U.S.
- Education: Temple University; Actors Studio
- Occupation: Actor
- Years active: 1962–2023
- Spouse: Jacqueline Petcove (m. 1962)
- Children: Morgan Margolis

Mark Margolis (/mɑːrˈɡoʊlɪs/, mar-GOH-liss; November 26, 1939 – August 3, 2023) was an American actor best known for his portrayal of the character Héctor Salamanca in Breaking Bad (2009–2011) and Better Call Saul (2016–2022). His performance in Breaking Bad was nominated for an Emmy Award in 2012.

Margolis, who started acting in his teens, regularly performed in the films of director Darren Aronofsky, appearing in his first six films beginning with Pi (1998). He was also known for playing Alberto "The Shadow" in Scarface (1983), Jimmy in The Equalizer (1985–1989), Mr. Shickadance in Ace Ventura: Pet Detective (1994), Antonio Nappa in Oz (1999–2003), Mr. Morrison in Short Eyes (1977) and the New Priest in Immortals (2011).

== Early life ==
Mark Margolis was born on November 26, 1939, in Philadelphia, Pennsylvania, the son of Jewish parents Fanya (née Fried) and Isidore Margolis. Margolis retained the tefillin of his great-grandfather, who had worn them daily, and said that his Judaism came from older relatives in his family.

Margolis was briefly a student at Temple University before dropping out and moving to New York City. At age 19, he was a student under Stella Adler at the Actors Studio. He was also later trained by Lee Strasberg and Barbara Loden.

== Career ==
After training with Adler, Margolis started performing in various plays. In 1962 he played in the Broadway production Infidel Caesar, a production based on Shakespeare's Julius Caesar. The play was closed in previews and never ended up officially opening. He subsequently founded Blue Dome, a touring theater company that performed various productions. Margolis then worked in over 50 Off-Broadway plays.

In 1976, Margolis made a film appearance as an airplane passenger in The Opening of Misty Beethoven. Margolis was also noted for his supporting roles in Scarface (1983), Short Eyes (1977), Ace Ventura: Pet Detective (1994), Immortals (2011), and the films of Darren Aronofsky: Pi (1998), Requiem for a Dream (2000), The Fountain (2006), The Wrestler (2008), Black Swan (2010), and Noah (2014).

In 1990, Margolis appeared in an episode of the science fiction television series Star Trek: The Next Generation. In 1991, he played Helmut Dieter in the soap opera Santa Barbara. In addition, he had recurring roles on numerous other TV shows, including The Equalizer, Quantum Leap, Oz, Law & Order, Crossing Jordan, Californication, Breaking Bad, and Better Call Saul. In January 2015, he portrayed Felix Faust in the Constantine episode "Quid Pro Quo". For his role in Breaking Bad as Héctor Salamanca, Margolis received a nomination for a Primetime Emmy Award for Outstanding Guest Actor in a Drama Series. He would later reprise the role in the show's spin-off series, Better Call Saul.

Despite focusing on television and film later in his career, Margolis continued acting on the stage. In 2010, he appeared as Bernie Madoff, in a regional production of Imagining Madoff. In the Berkeley Repertory Theater's 2014 season, he appeared as Gus in Tony Kushner's The Intelligent Homosexual's Guide to Capitalism and Socialism with a Key to the Scriptures. In 2019, he performed in another of Kushner's works, playing Gottfried Swetts in A Bright Room Called Day.

== Personal life ==
Margolis married Jacqueline Petcove on June 3, 1962. They had a son, Morgan Margolis, and three grandchildren. Margolis died at Mount Sinai Hospital in New York City following a short illness, on August 3, 2023, aged 83.

== Filmography ==
=== Film ===
| Year | Title | Role | Notes | Ref(s) |
|---|---|---|---|---|
| 1976 | The Opening of Misty Beethoven | Unhappy Airplane Passenger | Uncredited | |
| 1977 | Short Eyes | Mr. Morrison | Uncredited | |
| 1979 | Going in Style | Prison Guard | | |
| 1980 | Dressed to Kill | Patient | Uncredited | |
| 1980 | Christmas Evil | Christmas Party Patron (Man #2) | | |
| 1983 | Eddie Macon's Run | 5:00 Bar Owner | | |
| 1983 | Scarface | Alberto The Shadow | | |
| 1984 | The Cotton Club | Charlie Workman | | |
| 1987 | The Bedroom Window | Man in Phone Booth | | |
| 1987 | The Secret of My Succe$s | Maintenance Man | | |
| 1989 | Glory | 10th Connecticut Soldier | | |
| 1989 | White Hot | The Tin Man | | |
| 1990 | Delta Force 2: The Colombian Connection | Gen. Olmedo | | |
| 1990 | Tales from the Darkside: The Movie | Gage | | |
| 1991 | The Pit and the Pendulum | Mendoza | | |
| 1992 | 1492: Conquest of Paradise | Francisco de Bobadilla | | |
| 1994 | Ace Ventura: Pet Detective | Mr. Shickadance | | |
| 1994 | Squanto: A Warrior's Tale | Captain Thomas Hunt | | |
| 1996 | I Shot Andy Warhol | Louis Solanas | | |
| 1996 | The Pallbearer | Philip DeMarco | | |
| 1997 | Absolute Power | Red Brandsford | | |
| 1997 | Trouble on the Corner | Mr. Borofsky | | |
| 1998 | Side Streets | Bartender | | |
| 1998 | π | Sol Robeson | | |
| 1999 | Mickey Blue Eyes | Gene Morganson | | |
| 1999 | Flawless | Vinnie | | |
| 1999 | Jakob the Liar | Fajngold | | |
| 1999 | The Thomas Crown Affair | Heinrich Knutzhorn | | |
| 1999 | End of Days | Pope | | |
| 2000 | Fast Food, Fast Women | Graham | | |
| 2000 | Dinner Rush | Fitzgerald | | |
| 2000 | Requiem for a Dream | Mr. Rabinowitz | | |
| 2001 | Hardball | Fink | | |
| 2001 | The Tailor of Panama | Rafi Domingo | | |
| 2001 | Hannibal | Perfume Expert | | |
| 2002 | Infested | Father Morning | | |
| 2003 | Daredevil | Eddie Fallon | Uncredited | |
| 2004 | House of D | Mr. Pappass | | |
| 2005 | Stay | Business Man | | |
| 2005 | Headspace | Boris Pavlovsky | | |
| 2006 | The Fountain | Father Avila | | |
| 2007 | Gone Baby Gone | Leon Trett | | |
| 2007 | The Girl Next Door | Homeless Man Hit By Car | | |
| 2008 | Defiance | Jewish Elder | | |
| 2008 | Haber | Bremer | | |
| 2008 | The Wrestler | Lenny | | |
| 2008 | The Model Maker | The Model Maker | | |
| 2010 | Black Swan | Mr. Fithian | | |
| 2011 | Immortals | The New Priest | Uncredited | |
| 2011 | One Fall | Walter Grigg Sr. | | |
| 2011 | The Courier | Stitch | | |
| 2012 | Stand Up Guys | Claphands | | |
| 2013 | Beneath | Mr. Parks | | |
| 2013 | Northern Borders | Whiskeyjack Kittredge | | |
| 2014 | Noah | Magog | Voice | |
| 2015 | Nasty Baby | Richard | | |
| 2015 | The Abandoned | Jim | | |
| 2016 | My Big Fat Greek Wedding 2 | Panos | | |
| 2017 | Valley of Bones | El Papá | | |
| 2019 | Abe | Benjamin | | |
| 2020 | Minyan | Itzik | | |
| 2022 | Every Last Secret | Grandpa | | |

=== Television ===
| Year | Title | Role | Notes |
|---|---|---|---|
| 1982 | Muggable Mary, Street Cop | Sgt. Meyers | TV movie |
| 1983 | Rage of Angels | Ricky | TV movie |
| 1985–1989 | The Equalizer | Jimmy | 16 episodes from "Lady Cop" (S1.E5) to "Past Imperfect" (S4.E10) |
| 1989 | Quantum Leap | Adriano | Episode: "Double Identity – November 8, 1965" |
| 1990 | Star Trek: The Next Generation | Dr. Nel Apgar | Episode: "A Matter of Perspective" |
| 1990 | Columbo | Cosner | Episode: "Columbo Cries Wolf" |
| 1991 | Santa Barbara | Helmut Dieter | 13 episodes |
| 1992 | Law & Order | George Lobrano | Episode: "Prince of Darkness" |
| 1994 | New York Undercover | Clark Redmond | Episode: "After Shakespeare" |
| 1994 | Guiding Light | Harry Jones | Unknown episodes |
| 1995 | New York News | —N/a | Episode: "Past Imperfect" |
| 1997 | Law & Order | Bronson | Episode: "Legacy" |
| 1998–2003 | Oz | Antonio Nappa | 10 episodes |
| 1999 | Now and Again | Nicky Vordogov | Episode: "Pulp Turkey" |
| 2001 | Law & Order | Frankie 'Threads' Politto | Episode: "For Love or Money" |
| 2001 | 100 Centre Street | Merle Kiefer | Episode: "Andromeda and the Monster" |
| 2001 | Boss of Bosses | Joe Armone | TV movie |
| 2002 | The Practice | Ronald D'Amrosio | Episode: "Fire Proof" |
| 2003–2004 | Ed | Mazula | 2 episodes |
| 2004 | Law & Order: Criminal Intent | Mario Damiano | Episode: "Fico Di Capo" |
| 2004 | Sex and the City | Jean Paul Sandal | Episode: "The Cold War" |
| 2005 | Crossing Jordan | Cahill | Episode: "It Happened One Night" |
| 2007 | The Black Donnellys | Sal Minetta | Episode: "Pilot" |
| 2007 | Californication | Al Moody | Episode: "California Son" |
| 2009 | Kings | Premier Shaw | 2 episodes |
| 2009–2011 | Breaking Bad | Héctor Salamanca | 8 episodes |
| 2011 | Blue Bloods | Whitey Brennan | 2 episodes |
| 2011 | Mildred Pierce | Mr. Chris | 2 episodes |
| 2011 | Law & Order: Special Victims Unit | Rom-Baro | Episode: "Lost Traveler" |
| 2011 | The Good Wife | Father Jim | Episode: "Death Row Tip" |
| 2011–2012 | Person of Interest | Gianni Morretti | 3 episodes |
| 2012 | American Horror Story: Asylum | Sam Goodman | 3 episodes |
| 2015 | Constantine | Felix Faust | Episode: "Quid Pro Quo" |
| 2015 | Gotham | Paul Cicero | 2 episodes |
| 2015 | Elementary | Abraham Misraki | Episode: "T-Bone and the Iceman" |
| 2015 | 12 Monkeys | Mr. Werner | Episode: "Paradox" |
| 2015 | Benders | Paul's Grandfather | Episode: "Choke" |
| 2015 | The Affair | Arthur Solloway | 3 episodes |
| 2016–2022 | Better Call Saul | Héctor Salamanca | 22 episodes |
| 2020 | The Blacklist | Jakov Mitko | Episode: "Brothers" |
| 2020 | Snowpiercer | Old Ivan | Episode: "First, the Weather Changed" |
| 2021 | Prodigal Son | Rudolph Swann | Episode: "Head Case" |
| 2023 | Your Honor | Carmine Conti | 5 episodes |

=== Music videos ===
| Year | Title | Artist | Role | Refs |
|---|---|---|---|---|
| 1993 | "Bad Girl" | Madonna | Bartender | |

=== Video games ===
| Year | Title | Role | Refs |
|---|---|---|---|
| 2003 | Manhunt | Tramp (voice) | |

== Awards and nominations ==
| Year | Association | Category | Nominated work | Result |
|---|---|---|---|---|
| 2011 | Saturn Awards | Best Guest Starring Role on Television | Breaking Bad | Nominated |
| 2012 | Primetime Emmy Awards | Outstanding Guest Actor in a Drama Series | Breaking Bad | Nominated |
