= Morgan Margolis =

American actor and business executive

- Born: October 12, 1966 (age 60); New York City, US
- Other name: Morgan H. Margolis
- Occupations: Actor; Business Executive
- Years active: 1989–2010
- Spouse: Heidi Blose
- Children: 3
- Father: Mark Margolis

Morgan Margolis (born October 12, 1966) is an American business executive and former actor who is the Chief Executive Officer of Knitting Factory Entertainment (KFE), a multi-platform entertainment company involved in music venues, artist management, record labels, film and theatrical production, and hospitality ventures.

== Early life and education ==
Morgan Margolis was born in New York City and grew up in the Tribeca neighborhood. He is the son of actor Mark Margolis and Jacqueline (née Petcove) Margolis. In 1984, Margolis graduated from the High School of Performing Arts where he studied acting, after which he studied law at Stony Brook University.

== Career ==
=== Acting ===
Margolis' screen debut occurred in 1989 on the CBS television series The Equalizer in the episode "Race Traitors" portraying a skinhead named Chuck. Morgan's father Mark also had a role on The Equalizer as the recurring character Jimmy (1985–1989). In the 1990s, Margolis had guest appearances on Walker, Texas Ranger and Diagnosis Murder (both in 1995) and on and Star Trek: Voyager as a Vaskan in "Living Witness" (1998). In 2002, he guest starred on Star Trek: Enterprise as Crewman Baird in "Vanishing Point."

His film roles include a Policeman in 3000 Miles to Graceland (2001), and Darcy in Blind Spot (2002), among others.

=== Business ===
Margolis joined Knitting Factory Entertainment in 2000 as the Operations Manager of the Los Angeles Knitting Factory concert house. He later became Vice President of West Coast Operations during the company’s expansion into the Pacific Northwest, which included the opening of concert venues in Boise and Spokane and producing concerts at high-capacity venues across the U.S. In 2007, he was promoted to Vice President of National Operations, and within a year, he was named CEO of the company — a role he has held for over 17 years.

The company’s holdings and partnerships include:

- Concert venues and restaurants nationwide
- Ownership in Pappy and Harriet’s in Pioneertown, CA
- Co-ownership of The Regent Theatre in Los Angeles with Spaceland Presents founder Mitchell Frank

The company also owns KF Records, which includes the indie label Partisan Records. Partisan has received multiple accolades, including Music Week’s UK Label of the Year (2020) and two Libera Awards for Label of the Year (2020 and 2024), and has had annual Grammy nominations.

In 2019, KFE expanded its national touring and promotion capabilities by merging with CMoore Concerts. The combined entity books shows at large outdoor venues such as Outlaw Field in Idaho, Big Sky Brewery Amphitheater in Montana, and Wine Country Amphitheater in Washington. KFE also holds or has held talent buyer contracts at venues including The Slowdown (NE), Alma (WA), The Olympic (ID), Hop Springs (TN), and The Myth (MI), among others.

KFE has co-produced festivals and concerts such as Desert Daze, Maha Festival, Horton's Hayride, Underground Music Showcase, and Rachel Ray's Feedback. ^{8} Additionally, the company co-produced the Tony Award-winning Broadway production Fela!, the documentary They Will Have to Kill Us First, and the 2021 film Neptune Frost by Saul Williams.

In 2024, Margolis partnered with Jordan Wolowitz (Gov Ball NY) and Scott Osborn (Lights All Night) to launch the Zootown Music Festival in Missoula, Montana, with a lineup including Hozier and Kacey Musgraves. He also participated in a distribution partnership between Partisan Music Group and Virgin Music Group.

=== Recent projects and board memberships ===
Margolis serves on the boards of Fandiem, Buzznog, and Pappy and Harriet’s. In 2024, he joined the board of Chord Music Group, one of the largest music rights holders globally.

That same year, Margolis formed a partnership with the venue team behind Baby’s All Right in New York City to relaunch the Pyramid Club as Nightclub 101.

In December 2024, following a three-year legal battle, Margolis and The Margolis Group regained control of Pappy and Harriet’s in Pioneertown, California.

== Personal life ==
Margolis is married to Heidi Blose and together they have three children.

== Filmography ==
Morgan Margolis film and television credits
Year	Title	Role	Notes	Ref.
1989	The Equalizer	Chuck	Episode: "Race Traitors"	
1995	Walker, Texas Ranger	Cody Preston	1 episode	
1995	Diagnosis Murder	Rip McCord	1 episode	
1998	Star Trek: Voyager	Vaskan Rioter	Episode: "Living Witness"	
2002	Blind Spot	Darcy	Film	
2001	3000 Miles to Graceland	Policeman A	Film	
2002	Star Trek: Enterprise	Crewman Baird	Episode: "Vanishing Point"	
2003	The Commission	Ronald Simmons	TV film	
