= List of Coronation Street characters introduced in 2020 =

Coronation Street characters introduced in 2020

Coronation Street is a British soap opera first broadcast on 9 December 1960. The following is a list of characters introduced in 2020, by order of first appearance. All characters are introduced by series producer Iain MacLeod. The first character to be introduced is Danny Tomlinson (Dylan Brady), a love interest of James Bailey (Nathan Graham), in February. In March, Arthur Medwin (Paul Copley) was introduced as a love interest for Evelyn Plummer (Maureen Lipman), and April saw the arrival of an old friend of Johnny Connor (Richard Hawley), Scott Emberton (Tom Roberts), as well as the ex-wife of Rick Neelan (Greg Wood), Laura Neelan (Kel Allen). Nicky Wheatley (Kimberly Hart-Simpson) made her first appearance in June as a new love interest for Daniel Osbourne (Rob Mallard). The former partner of Geoff Metcalfe (Ian Bartholomew) and biological mother of Tim Metcalfe (Joe Duttine), Elaine Jones (Paula Wilcox), made her first appearance in July, and George Shuttleworth (Tony Maudsley) made his debut in September. In October, Sam Blakeman (Jude Riordan) made his debut as the son of Natasha Blakeman (Rachel Leskovac) and Nick Tilsley (Ben Price). Daisy Midgeley (Charlotte Jordan) then made her first appearance in November. Additionally, multiple other characters appear throughout the year.

== Danny Tomlinson ==
Danny Tomlinson
- Coronation Street character
- Portrayed by: Dylan Brady
- Duration: 2020–2021
- First appearance: Episode 10,006; 14 February 2020
- Last appearance: Episode 10,477; 8 November 2021
- Introduced by: Iain MacLeod
In-universe information
- Occupation: Temporary Bar Manager; Head Chef

Danny Tomlinson, played by Dylan Brady, first appeared in episode 10,006, first broadcast on 14 February 2020. Danny is introduced as a former colleague of Ed Bailey (Trevor Michael Georges), who comes out as gay to Ed. Ed is shocked, but supports Danny. When he leaves, Ed's son James Bailey (Nathan Graham) kisses him, and it is revealed that they have a romantic history. James is not out as gay to his father, and Danny struggles with lying to Ed, so James promises to come out. Danny accidentally tweets James, asking him when they can see each other, which the media see. James is outed, and despite apologising to him, he does not forgive Danny.

Details about the character and Brady's casting were announced on 9 February 2020. On his casting, Brady commented "I met with casting director Gennie Radcliffe and one of the directors and I did a read through. A week later I was told I’d got the part. It was so exciting, to be a part of a show that’s so ingrained in my childhood. I grew up watching it."

== Arthur Medwin ==
Arthur Medwin
- Coronation Street character
- Portrayed by: Paul Copley
- Duration: 2020–2021
- First appearance: Episode 10,033; 16 March 2020
- Last appearance: Episode 10,235/6; 6 January 2021
- Introduced by: Iain MacLeod
In-universe information
- Wife: Beryl Medwin

Arthur Medwin, played by Paul Copley, is the ex-boyfriend of Evelyn Plummer (Maureen Lipman), whom she begins a relationship with again. Copley's casting was announced on 14 January 2020, and was described to be playing a "secret role". On the day of the casting announcement, he was seen arriving on set and had been seen filming scenes with Lipman and Alan Halsall, who plays her on-screen grandson, Tyrone Dobbs.

Arthur was Copley's third role in Coronation Street, after playing a photographer in 1972 and Ivor Priestley in 2007. Arthur first appeared on 16 March 2020, and after the death of his wife Beryl, he built up a relationship with Evelyn, which ended when he wanted to go to Canada and she did not, leading to his departure nearly a year later.

== Scott Emberton ==
Scott Emberton
- Coronation Street character
- Portrayed by: Tom Roberts
- First appearance: Episode 10,049; 15 April 2020
- Last appearance: Episode 10,152; 30 October 2020
- Introduced by: Iain MacLeod

Scott Emberton, portrayed by Tom Roberts, first appeared on 15 April 2020. Scott is introduced a visitor staying at the Rovers' B&B, who has an undisclosed connection to established character Johnny Connor (Richard Hawley). Upon his arrival, Liz McDonald (Beverley Callard) flirts with Scott, and he buys her a drink. It is later revealed that Scott knows Johnny from their youth, when they used to commit crimes together. Years before his arrival in Weatherfield, Scott took responsibility for Johnny's crimes by going to prison for him. Scott takes a dislike to Ray Crosby (Mark Frost), and when he discovers that Ray is rich, Scott devises a plan to rob his bistro. Scott coerces Johnny into helping him, but when Johnny instead calls the police on the robbery, Scott shoots police officer Craig Tinker (Colson Smith). After Johnny informs wife Jenny Bradley (Sally Ann Matthews) of his history with Scott and the robbery of the bistro, Scott takes the pair hostage and states that he will kill the pair of them, as well as himself. However, Scott gives himself up to the police. His final scenes aired on 30 October 2020.

Talking to Inside Soap on his character's connection to Johnny, Roberts commented: "It's obvious that Johnny fears Scott – he thought this guy was out of his life forever and now he’s turned up at his B&B!", adding: "He greets Johnny as though he’s really pleased to see him, but there are things underneath that haven’t yet come to the surface. It’s pretty clear that Johnny wants to avoid Scott". On Scott's relationship with Liz, Roberts said: "Scott is drawn to Liz McDonald. He spends a lot of time propping up the Rovers bar, being quick with the jokes and banter. This is a man who lives quite a transient life because he’s a building project manager, so he moves from job to job around the country."

== Laura Neelan ==
Laura Neelan
- Coronation Street character
- Portrayed by: Kel Allen
- Duration: 2020–2022
- First appearance: Episode 10,054; 27 April 2020
- Last appearance: Episode 10,447; 8 April 2022
- Introduced by: Iain MacLeod
In-universe information
- Husband: Rick Neelan (divorced)
- Daughters: Kelly Neelan

Laura Neelan, played by Kel Allen, first appeared on 27 April 2020. Laura is the mother of Kelly Neelan (Millie Gibson) who arrives in Weatherfield to question why Gary Windass (Mikey North) is seeing Kelly so much. Laura asks Gary where her husband, Rick Neelan (Greg Wood) is, and instead of telling Laura he killed Rick, he says that Rick is abroad. As Gary is secretly paying for Kelly's private school fees, he asks why Kelly is now attending Weatherfield High, and he tells her that Rick wants her to attend private school again. After Kelly reports Laura to the police for child neglect, she is charged but given a suspended sentence.

Details surrounding Allen's casting were announced on 26 March 2020. In an interview with Digital Spy, Allen spoke about storylines that she would like for her character, such as Laura having a relationship with established character Peter Barlow (Chris Gascoyne). On a potential relationship with Adam Barlow (Sam Robertson), she stated that "she just wants to jump into bed with him, as that's what she's about", and joked that "Laura can go around all the Barlows, try them all out!" She also explained that she would love to work in The Rovers Return Inn, saying: "She would be behind that bar pulling pints, taking tips and popping them in her bra. She's that kind of girl, isn't she? She'd be swapping numbers with whoever comes through the door, if she knows what's in the bank account. She's for the money and she's for an easy life. That's what I love about her", adding that she could "definitely see [Laura] as a barmaid". Allen also stated that Laura is "such a character", and that she is completely different to Allen in real life. Inside Soap's Laura-Jayne Tyler opined that Laura should be promoted to a series regular; she admitted that the character is a "car crash" but felt that it added to her charm. Allen has appeared in Coronation Street previously, as Lulu Lockett, a club owner that Bethany Platt (Lucy Fallon) worked for in 2018.

In February 2022, Allen confirmed that she had opted to leave Coronation Street. Her exit storyline will see Laura tell Kelly that she has stomach cancer and has months to live in "heartbreaking scenes". Her last appearance was broadcast on 8 April 2022 where she died peacefully in her sleep.

In 2022, Laura-Jayne Tyler from Inside Soap praised the character, writing, "We chuffin' love Kelly's mum Laura. We're praying that her dying confession is a big fat scam so Corrie can make her a regular".

== DS Abney ==
DS Abney
- Coronation Street character
- Portrayed by: Fiona Skinner
- Duration: 2020–2021
- First appearance: Episode 10,057; 4 May 2020
- Last appearance: Episode 10,489; 22 November 2021
- Introduced by: Iain MacLeod
In-universe information
- Occupation: Detective Sergeant

Detective Sergeant Abney, played Fiona Skinner, was a police officer who investigated crimes that occurred in Weatherfield between 2020 and 2021. She first appeared on 4 May 2020 when she leads the questioning of Yasmeen Metcalfe (Shelley King) after she stabbed her husband, Geoff Metcalfe (Ian Bartholomew) in the throat in self-defence. After gaining consciousness, she also goes to question Geoff, but is interrupted by Yasmeen's granddaughter, Alya Nazir (Sair Khan). Khan explained: "She's full of rage, but her outburst doesn’t impress DS Abney, who seems to be treating Geoff as the victim. She's led away by the police, but manages to catch Sally alone and begs her to realise that this is so out of character for Yasmeen. She plants a seed of doubt in Sally's mind about who Geoff really is."

Abney also interviewed Yasmeen after Geoff died falling off his roof after setting his house on fire with Yasmeen inside on 9 December 2020. Yasmeen thought that she was being interviewed as a suspect of Geoff's potential murder, but Abney clarified it was as a witness. In August 2021, she investigates the salon flat fire which was started by Hope Stape (Isabella Flanagan), and questions her to see if she knows the difference between right and wrong. In October 2021, she investigates a case involving Abi Franklin (Sally Carman) holding Corey Brent (Maximus Evans) at gunpoint. She arrives at No. 13 Coronation Street that the gun that killed Natasha Blakeman (Rachel Leskovac) was the same one used by Tez Wyatt (Stephen Lord) in a raid several years ago. Tez was who Abi bought the gun from.

== Nicky Wheatley ==
Nicky Wheatley
- Coronation Street character
- Portrayed by: Kimberly Hart-Simpson
- Duration: 2020, 2022, 2024
- First appearance: Episode 10,075; 17 June 2020
- Last appearance: Episode 11,357; 16 September 2024
- Introduced by: Iain MacLeod
In-universe information
- Occupation: Escort
- Mother: Ellen Wheatley
- Daughters: Maisie Wheatley

Nicky Wheatley, played by Kimberly Hart-Simpson, made her first appearance on 17 June 2020. The character and casting details were announced on 2 June 2020, with the actress who has previously appeared on the Channel 4 soap opera Hollyoaks confirming her casting on Instagram. Nicky is introduced as a love interest for established character Daniel Osbourne (Rob Mallard), with Mallard comparing her to Daniel's late wife Sinead Osbourne (Katie McGlynn). He commented: "Nicky has no boundaries and for Daniel, who is so uptight, it's refreshing to have someone who doesn't tip-toe around him. She is very bolshy and that is what attracts him. She is very opposite to Sinead, because Sinead wasn't like that, but they are both a similar height, both are blonde, and from the first glance, subconsciously, he will have been drawn to her. Maybe subconsciously, Nicky also reminds Daniel of Sinead in a way."

Hart-Simpson expressed her joy at being cast in Coronation Street, having wanted to appear in the soap for over ten years prior to her casting. She commented: "I love other soaps and love other TV programmes, but it’s just in my blood and if you snapped me in half, I’d say Corrie no doubt. What they do for women on that programme is just incredible." She also talked about having an interaction with Barbara Knox, who plays Rita Tanner, on her first day which left her "star-struck". Hart-Simpson explained that she found out more about Nicky's background from reading scripts, rather than knowing beforehand. On her character being a sex worker, Hart-Simpson stated that she had a "strong reason in my head as to why she's doing this job", and that rather than "being able to afford a nice handbag", she wanted Nicky to have a deeper reasoning for her occupation.

Laura Denby of Radio Times wrote a piece praising the character of Nicky. She wrote that due to the "impact" Nicky had made on the soap within her first few months, the character deserved more than being "love interest status", in referral to Nicky only appearing as Daniel's love interest. Denby stated that there is "definitely potential to make her a permanent fixture", and noted her "strength and confidence", "likeable presence and fighting spirit", as well as her "sharp tongue and bubbly nature". Denby also compared her to "icons" Hilda Ogden (Jean Alexander) and Carla Connor (Alison King), adding that "anyone who can match the resilience of these soap icons deserves more than a 'shelf life' storyline." Denby proposed the idea that Nicky would be a good barmaid in the Rovers Return Inn, stating that an "unlikely friendship" with Emma Brooker (Alexandra Mardell) would be "TV gold". She concluded the piece by commenting: "Nicky could be destined for soap longevity as an established character".

On 28 October 2020, it was announced that Hart-Simpson had made her final appearance as Nicky a month prior to the confirmation. The Sun reported that a source on the programme stated: "Nicky's proved really popular with viewers and the bosses absolutely love Kimberly. The character has gone off for the storyline to develop but the door is very much open for her return." In a radio interview in March 2021, Hart-Simpson stated that she wants to reprise her role as Nicky, joking: "I'd give my left tit to go back, quite frankly". She added that "the door has completely remained open", and that her "heart will forever and utterly be Coronation Street", since she grew up watching it. In December 2021, she announced that she was returning to the soap in 2022. In July 2022, Hart-Simpson confirmed via her Instagram account that she had left the soap and her final scenes had aired in the episode broadcast 1 July 2022.

In April 2024, it was announced that Hart-Simpson would reprise the role of Nicky later that year, with the actress saying, "It's been 4 years since we first met Nicky and it is once again a pleasure to be back on the cobbles. Stories surrounding women within the sex industry have often been forgotten, shamed or unspoken. But not at Coronation Street, they respectfully explore the world these women live in, the impact it has on the community and at some points dangers attached to the work [...] I am looking forward to the audience finding out who and where she is today".

Gary Gillatt from Inside Soap joked that Nicky "has the best 'appalled' face in soap. She's like a human emoji".

== Lucie Fernsby ==
Lucie Fernsby
- Coronation Street character
- Portrayed by: Nicola Duffett
- First appearance: Episode 10,087; 13 July 2020
- Last appearance: Episode 10,091; 20 July 2020
- Introduced by: Iain MacLeod
In-universe information
- Occupation: Prison Inmate

Lucie Fernsby, portrayed by Nicola Duffett, is a woman in prison that befriends Yasmeen Metcalfe (Shelley King). Her casting was announced on 7 July 2020 with Jess Lee from Digital Spy reporting: "Nicola Duffett – who played Debbie Bates on EastEnders between 1993 and 1995 – will be seen on screen in the Weatherfield soap from next week as Lucie, Yasmeen's prison friend." This was Duffett's second role on Coronation Street after playing a character named Mrs Bird in 2015.

Lucie discovers that Yasmeen is being psychologically abused and coercively controlled by her husband Geoff Metcalfe (Ian Bartholomew), and she explains to Yasmeen that she too was in a controlling relationship, and states that she is in prison due to what she did to her abusive former partner. She gives Yasmeen a contraband phone, and suggests that she should call him to end their marriage.

== Elaine Jones ==
Elaine Jones
- Coronation Street character
- Portrayed by: Paula Wilcox
- Duration: 2020–2023
- First appearance: Episode 10,090; 20 July 2020
- Last appearance: Episode 11,089; 20 October 2023
- Introduced by: Iain MacLeod
In-universe information
- Other names: Philippa Metcalfe
- Occupation: Shareholder
- Husband: Geoff Metcalfe (backstory)
- Sons: Tim Metcalfe
- Granddaughters: Faye Windass
- Other relatives: Miley Hodge

Elaine Jones, played by Paula Wilcox, made her first appearance on 20 July 2020. Elaine is introduced as the ex-wife of Geoff Metcalfe (Ian Bartholomew), due to Geoff psychologically abusing and coercively controlling his current wife, Yasmeen Metcalfe (Shelley King). Elaine visits Yasmeen in prison under the false pretence that she is from a prison charity, later revealing herself as Geoff's former wife. She explains that Geoff abused and controlled her for several years, and advises her to read books about coercive control. Yasmeen's granddaughter Alya Nazir (Sair Khan) approaches Elaine when she sees her in Weatherfield, and asks her to stand against Geoff in court; Elaine declines as she remains fearful of Geoff. Elaine reveals that she is the biological mother of Tim Metcalfe (Joe Duttine), who Geoff said had died of cancer in the 1970s. She tells Tim that Geoff had an affair with her best friend Tessa, who later married Geoff and raised Tim, and forced her to abandon the marital home, leaving Tim behind. When Geoff learns that Elaine is in Weatherfield and sees her in the street, he threatens her, and is later seen disposing of her SIM card. When Alya tries to contact Elaine, it transpires that she has gone missing.

Digital Spy described Elaine's role in the coercive control storyline as "pivotal", and hinted that her arrival in Weatherfield "may offer fresh hope for Yasmeen". Actress Wilcox said that being part of the storyline was "daunting", and that she "quickly realised that [she] was going to be part of something very big and very important". Viewers began to suspect that Elaine would be revealed as the mother of Geoff's son Tim Metcalfe (Joe Duttine), which producers later confirmed to be true. Wilcox has appeared in the series previously in 1969, as Janice Langton, the sister of Ray Langton (Neville Buswell).

== Dr Howarth ==
Dr Howarth
- Coronation Street character
- Portrayed by: Caroline Harding
- First appearance: Episode 10,113/4; 11 September 2020
- Last appearance: Episode 10,180; 27 September 2020
- Introduced by: Iain MacLeod
In-universe information
- Occupation: Doctor

Dr. Howarth, portrayed by Caroline Harding, is a doctor at Weatherfield General who treats a dying Oliver Battersby (Jeremiah and Emmanuel Cheetham). Her casting was announced on 11 August 2020 with Duncan Lindsay from Metro reporting: "Chris Gascoyne's [who plays Peter Barlow] wife Caroline Harding has rejoined the cast of Coronation Street to play a doctor who will care for Oliver Battersby as part of his battle against mitochondrial disease." This was Harding's second role on Coronation Street after playing a doctor who treated Hope Dobbs (Isabella Flanagan) in 2015. When Oliver's mother Leanne Battersby (Jane Danson) hears that Oliver's condition is incurable, she takes Dr. Howarth and the hospital to court over the decision to turn off Oliver's life support. After Leanne and Oliver's father Steve McDonald (Simon Gregson) realise that the best thing is to let Oliver go, Dr. Howarth turns off the machines, while Leanne and Steve say an emotional goodbye to their son.

== George Shuttleworth ==
George Shuttleworth
- Coronation Street character
- Portrayed by: Tony Maudsley
- Duration: 2020–present
- First appearance: Episode 10,118; 16 September 2020
- Introduced by: Iain MacLeod
In-universe information
- Occupation: Funeral director
- Father: Archie Shuttleworth
- Sisters: Glenda Shuttleworth
- Aunts: Nellie
- Other relatives: Gail Platt; David Platt; Sarah Platt; Nick Tilsley; Bethany Platt; Sam Blakeman; Lily Platt; Billy Platt; Augustus Page; Fanny Page

George Shuttleworth, played by Tony Maudsley, made his first appearance on 16 September 2020. George will be introduced as the son of Archie Shuttleworth (Roy Hudd), who has inherited his father's funeral directory. After The Sun reported that Maudsley would be joining the cast of Coronation Street, he confirmed his casting on Twitter. Originally set to begin filming on 22 April 2020, his filming was postponed to 23 July 2020 due to production of the programme being affected. While appearing on Good Morning Britain, actress Sue Cleaver hinted that George may be a love interest for her character Eileen Grimshaw. They start a relationship, but George reluctantly ends it when Eileen realises that she only loves him as a friend leaving George heartbroken.

== Sam Blakeman ==
Sam Blakeman
- Coronation Street character
- Portrayed by: Jude Riordan
- Duration: 2020–present
- First appearance: Episode 10,131; 2 October 2020
- Introduced by: Iain MacLeod
In-universe information
- Occupation: Student
- Father: Nick Tilsley
- Mother: Natasha Blakeman
- Grandfathers: Brian Tilsley
- Grandmothers: Gail Platt
- Uncles: David Platt
- Aunts: Sarah Platt
- First cousins: Bethany Platt; Billy Platt; Harry Platt; Lily Platt; Harper Platt; Max Turner (adoptive)
- Other relatives: Audrey Roberts; Stephen Reid; George Shuttleworth; Bert Tilsley; Ivy Tilsley

Sam Blakeman, played by Jude Riordan, made his first appearance on 2 October 2020. Sam is introduced as the nine-year-old son of Natasha Blakeman (Rachel Leskovac) and Nick Tilsley (Ben Price). Prior to his first appearance on Coronation Street, Sam is unaware that Nick is his father, and was raised solely by Natasha. Leskovac, who portrays mother Natasha, noted that her character's priority is the "emotional impact" that getting to know Nick will have on Sam, and that she is "trying to do the right thing by him". On the casting process, Riordan's mother stated that he was invited to a casting call in February 2020 and had a screen test with Price, who portrays father Nick, but did not hear about his casting until July of that year, due to production of the soap halting due to the COVID-19 pandemic. She added that Riordan was "over the moon" to be cast on the programme.

For his portrayal of Sam, Riordan was awarded the Best Newcomer at the 2020 Digital Spy Reader Awards. Upon his nomination, Riordan's mother stated that he did not initially know what an award nomination meant, but was "made up and overwhelmed" after it was explained. In 2021, he received the Newcomer award at the 26th National Television Awards, becoming the youngest winner in the NTA's history. He has also been nominated for the Favourite Newcomer TVTimes Award, and longlisted for the Best Newcomer Inside Soap Award that year.

== Bishop Greg Townsend ==
Greg Townsend
- Coronation Street character
- Portrayed by: Roger Bingham
- Duration: 2020–2024, 2026
- First appearance: Episode 10,164; 9 November 2020
- Last appearance: Episode 11,784; 28 January 2026
- Introduced by: Iain MacLeod (2020); Kate Brooks (2026)
In-universe information
- Occupation: Bishop

Bishop Greg Townsend, portrayed by Roger Bingham, is a bishop who makes guest appearances between 2020 and 2024. He first appears on 9 November 2020 when he informs Billy Mayhew (Daniel Brocklebank) that his archdeacon interview was a success. He reappears on 19 July 2021 when he expresses his anger towards Billy marrying Todd Grimshaw (Gareth Pierce). A later return in October 2023 sees a similar situation where the Bishop arrives to voice his anger towards Billy's marriage to Paul Foreman (Peter Ash) in the church. This return was well received by fans with some wanting him to be made a regular character. Phoebe Tonks from OK! magazine said: "As Bishop Greg Townsend was revealed to fans on Coronation Street in the wake of Billy Mayhew's wedding, fans at home couldn't help but beg for ITV to make him a permanent fixture." She continued: "Although it is currently unknown whether the Bishop will reprise his role in future as Billy’s storyline plays out, it’s safe to say the C of E clergyman has certainly left his mark on viewers."

On 27 January 2026, Bishop Townsend returned to conduct Billy's funeral after he was killed by Theo Silverton (James Cartwright) during the special Corriedale crossover episode. Theo spoke to the Bishop about his guilt, which Townsend suggests is survivor's guilt and recommends he prays about it. The Bishop then asks Todd to deliver Billy's eulogy.

== Daisy Midgeley ==
Daisy Midgeley, played by Charlotte Jordan, made her first appearance on 27 November 2020. She is introduced as the ex-stepdaughter of established character Jenny Bradley (Sally Ann Matthews), who was married to Daisy's father and raised Daisy as a teenager. A month prior to the announcement of her casting, Daisy was mentioned on-screen by Jenny, who was phoning the character, and it is explained that despite the breakdown of Jenny's marriage with Daisy's father, she kept in touch with Daisy. Daisy is introduced alongside boyfriend Lee (Oliver Devoti). Jess Lee of Digital Spy stated that Jenny is delighted to see Daisy again, but that she will "cause trouble during her time in Weatherfield". ITV stated that there is "a lot more to Daisy than her sweet name suggests", with producer Ian MacLeod stating: "Daisy might seem like sweetness and light at first, but can be a maelstrom of minxy mischief when the mood takes her. She revels in devilment and can be very self-serving, but she’s fiercely loyal to those she cares about - although her loyalties can change in a heartbeat", adding that Daisy's motive is to "bring chaos and conflict into Jenny's life" as revenge for Jenny walking out on them. Jordan said that she was "thrilled" to be joining Coronation Street during the 60th anniversary of the soap, and noted that it was especially great to be cast in the midst of the ongoing pandemic.

== Other characters ==
Character	Episode date(s)	Actor	Circumstances
Vanessa Finney	26 February – 22 January 2021	Rachael Elizabeth	A wealthy mother at Gemma Winter's (Dolly-Rose Campbell) parent support group who bullies and embarrasses Gemma. When she discovers Gemma's online blog about her parenting experience, Vanessa apologises to her for her actions.
Imogen Tatum	26 February – 20 March	Lucy Farrar	A friend of Vanessa Finney (Rachael Elizabeth) who joins in on bullying Gemma Winter (Dolly-Rose Campbell).
Chelsey	12–19 June	Isobella Hubbard	A woman who was staying in a squat with Carla Connor (Alison King). She blackmails Carla, asking for £1000, threatening to reveal Carla's actions.
Jordan	17–19 June	James Boyland	The leader of a squat which Carla Connor (Alison King) stayed at. He explains that she slept with him in order to have a place to stay overnight.
Josie MacGyver	10 July	Lindsay Bennett-Thompson	The leader of a support group for parents with terminally ill children. Toyah Battersby (Georgia Taylor) arranges for her to meet with her stepsister Leanne Battersby (Jane Danson), and she shares her experiences with the death of her child with Leanne.
Driver	31 July	Lloyd Bass	A man who almost hits Sarah Platt (Tina O'Brien) with his car, but he hits Gary Windass (Mikey North) instead. He pledges to move his car so that the ambulance have room to help Gary, but he drives away.
Safia	21 August	Sofiya Limalia	A woman who claims to be Todd Grimshaw (Gareth Pierce) after finding his phone. She writes to Todd's mother Eileen Grimshaw (Sue Cleaver) asking for money but is unable to get the money once her true identity is discovered.
Baz	28 August	Neil Hurst	A client of Nicky Wheatley (Kimberly Hart-Simpson).
Colin	11–14 September	Danny Lawrence	A man hired by Ray Crosby (Mark Frost) to pretend to be an employee from a water company. He tells David Platt (Jack P. Shepherd) that his house cannot be lived in due to a sinkhole in his back garden.
Dr. Schmitz (voice)	16–18 September	Julian M. Deuster	A doctor from Germany who discusses Oliver Battersby's (Cheetham & Cheetham) treatment with his mother Leanne Battersby (Jane Danson) over the phone.
Ellen Wheatley	23 September	Eithne Browne	The mother of Nicky Wheatley (Kimberly Hart-Simpson) who meets with Daniel Osbourne (Rob Mallard) to talk to him about Nicky's past and daughter, Maisie.
Mick Chaney	9 October – 10 February 2021	Neil Bell	A burglary ring leader that was the boss of Todd Grimshaw (Gareth Pierce), who owes Mick money. George Shuttleworth (Tony Maudsley) arranges a fake funeral in order to make Mick think that Todd has died, but when Mick discovers the truth, he expresses that he will get vengeance. When Mick assaults Gary Windass (Mikey North), Eileen Grimshaw (Sue Cleaver) suggests that if Mick does not leave Todd alone, she will report him to the police. He is later shown throwing Ray Crosby (Mark Frost) out of the back of a van, stating that he owes him money.
Erik	19 October	Paul Joseph	The husband of Mick Chaney (Neil Bell), who is unaware that Mick had an affair with Todd Grimshaw (Gareth Pierce).
Margaret Newsome	28 October – 25 November	Jane Lowe	The mother of a man named Grant, who died of alcoholism caused by a robbery that Johnny Connor (Richard Hawley) was involved in.
Doris Braithwaite	30 October	Val Tagger	A fan of Geoff Metcalfe's (Ian Bartholomew) radio show, who meets him at the bistro for lunch. Alya Nazir (Sair Khan) assumes that they are on a date but is then surprised to learn that they are just friends. Geoff later reports Alya to the police for harassment and Doris supports Geoff's statement by accusing Alya of being verbally aggressive.
Christine	30 October – 9 December	Kate Wood	A potential victim of Geoff Metcalfe (Ian Bartholomew) who she meets at a hotel. She is then seen arriving at No. 6 with Geoff and is warned by Geoff's son Tim Metcalfe (Joe Duttine) and Alya Nazir (Sair Khan) that she is in danger. Christine refuses to believe them and Geoff orders them to leave. Weeks later, Alya visits Christine at her home in Oldham and proves to her that Geoff has bad intentions. This time, Christine believes Alya, and is later seen on the phone to Geoff telling him that she finds it hard being with him.
Lee	27 November	Oliver Devoti	The boyfriend of Daisy Midgeley (Charlotte Jordan). She ends their relationship after moving to Weatherfield.
Prosecution Barrister	2–7 December	Amelia Curtis	The Barrister who leads the prosecution at Yasmeen Metcalfe's (Shelley King) attempted murder trial.
