= Kate Long =

English novelist (born 1964)

Kate Long (born 1964) is an English author. She is best known for the number one bestselling novel The Bad Mother's Handbook. She lives in Whitchurch in Shropshire.

== Biography ==
Kate Long was born in 1964 and raised in Blackrod, a village between Wigan and Bolton, and was educated at Bolton School. At 18 she left home to study English at Bristol University, where she graduated with a First Class Honours degree, then trained as a teacher in Exmouth for a year. For over a decade, she taught at Abbey Gate College, a secondary school just outside Chester.

Her first novel, The Bad Mother's Handbook was published by Picador in 2004, was serialized on BBC Radio Four's Book at Bedtime and nominated for a British Book Award. The film rights were bought by Ruby Films and ITV produced the TV version in February 2007 which starred Catherine Tate. Since then she has written eight other novels: Swallowing Grandma, Queen Mum, The Daughter Game, Mothers and Daughters (first published as 'A Mother's Guide to Cheating'), Before She Was Mine, Bad Mothers United which is the sequel to The Bad Mother's Handbook, and Something Only We Know.

As well as novels, Long has written for BBC Wildlife Magazine, collaborated with Hugh Warwick, Melissa Harrison and Carolyn Jess-Cooke on their collections of non-fiction essays, and had short stories published in Woman's Own, Woman & Home, the Sunday Express magazine and the Sunday Night Book Club anthology.

Her latest book, Boost Creative Writing Confidence at KS2, is a guide on how to teach creative writing to children. She blogs weekly about how to engage children with exciting, accessible poetry and stories.
