= Dean Silvers =

American film director

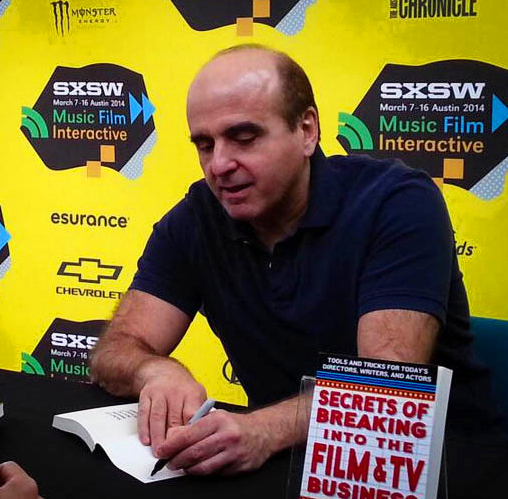
- Silvers at SXSW book signing
- Born: Dean Silvers; Brooklyn, New York, U.S.
- Occupations: Film producer, film director, screenwriter, attorney, author
- Years active: 1985 – present
- Spouse: Marlen Hecht (m. 1987)
- Website: deansilvers.com

Dean Silvers is an American film producer, film director, screenwriter, attorney and author.

== Personal life ==
Dean Silvers was born in Brooklyn, New York and currently resides in Manhattan, New York with his wife, Marlen Hecht, and their two sons, Forrest Silvers and Tyler Silvers.

Silvers is a member of the Academy of Motion Picture Arts and Sciences.

== Career ==
He produced Flirting with Disaster, Manny & Lo, and Spanking the Monkey, which won the Audience Award at the Sundance Film Festival and two Independent Spirit Awards.

The New York Times "Bookshelf" column wrote that Silvers' book, Secrets of Breaking into the Film and TV Business (William Morrow and Company/HarperCollins), is "brimming with helpful hints".

== Filmography ==
- Unconquered (1989) (co-producer) (CBS Broadcasting Inc. (CBS))
- Resident Alien (1990) (co-producer) (Docurama)
- The Last Good Time (1994) (producer) (The Samuel Goldwyn Company)
- Spanking the Monkey (1994) (producer) (Fine Line Features)
- Wigstock: The Movie (1995) (producer) (The Samuel Goldwyn Company)
- Manny & Lo (1996) (producer) (Sony Pictures Classics)
- Flirting with Disaster (1996) (producer) (Miramax Films)
- Split Screen (1997–2001) (executive producer) (Independent Film Channel (IFC))
- Warriors of the French Foreign Legion (2000) (executive producer) (Discovery Channel)
- Committed (2000) (producer) (Miramax Films)
- Border Patrol: Life on the Line (2001) (executive producer) (Discovery Channel)
- The Atlantis Conspiracy (2001) (director, writer, and producer) (Home Box Office (HBO) and Zweites Deutsches Fernsehen (ZDF))
- The Investigators (TruTV series) (2002–2004) (executive producer) (TruTV)
- Dor I' Dor: Honoring the Generations (2008) (producer and writer) (Weizmann Institute of Science)
- Beyond the Fire (2009) (executive producer)
- One Fall (2011) (producer) (Paladin Film)
- Sela (2013) (producer and writer) (Weizmann Institute of Science)
- Becoming Jiff (2018) (executive producer) (Samuel Goldwyn Films)

== Bibliography ==
- Secrets of Breaking into the Film and TV Business (2014, ISBN 0-062-28006-6) (William Morrow and Company/HarperCollins)
