= Lorna Brown (actress) =

British actress and singer

- Born: 9 February
- Education: Royal Central School of Speech and Drama
- Occupations: Actress; singer
- Years active: 1993–present

Lorna Brown (born 9 February) is a British actress and singer. She made her stage debut in the Olivier Award-winning West End production of Once on This Island in 1994, and since then has worked largely in television. Brown appeared in the long-running dramas Holby City and The Bill and the sketch shows French and Saunders and The Catherine Tate Show, before taking on regular roles in the financial thriller Devils, the mockumentary sitcom Hard Cell, and the fantasy horror series Vampire Academy during the early 2020s.

She has also acted in films, with her first feature film performance as sex worker Lily in Little Soldier (2008) receiving a Robert Award nomination for Best Actress in a Supporting Role. Her further film appearances include Gambit (2012), Les Misérables (2012), The Lady in the Van (2015), Taking Stock (2015), Terminator: Dark Fate (2019) and The Batman (2022).

== Career ==
After training at the Royal Central School of Speech and Drama, Brown debuted in the West End production of the musical Once on This Island (1994), playing the lead role of Ti Moune. Since then, her acting experience has taken her from the Royal Shakespeare Company and the National Theatre to television and feature films. Brown's 2008 feature film debut, Little Soldier, won the Prize of the Ecumenical Jury at the 59th Berlin International Film Festival and saw her nominated for Best Actress in a Supporting Role at the 26th Robert Awards, the Danish equivalent of the American Oscars and British BAFTAs.

In 2004, she played production assistant Abba throughout the six series of the sketch comedy series French and Saunders, soon followed by a few parts in The Catherine Tate Show. From 2007 to 2008, she starred as regular Leanne Samuels in ten episodes of ITV's police crime drama The Bill, before making her guest and final appearance in the 2009 episode "One Year On". In 2016, Brown starred in the eighteenth series of the medical drama Holby City as consultant psychiatrist Naomi Palmer, a love interest for Adrian Fletcher and Raf di Lucca, and then took the recurring role of Vicky Bale in the financial thriller Devils (2020). In 2022, she appeared as Cal in Catherine Tate's six-part mockumentary sitcom Hard Cell, released on Netflix, and as Rose Hathaway's mother Janine in the Peacock fantasy horror series Vampire Academy, based on the novel series of the same name by Richelle Mead.

She has been in a number of theatrical productions, including National Theatre Live's Medea (2014), starring Helen McCrory, and Hamlet (2017), starring Andrew Scott and broadcast on BBC Two. She has also portrayed Erzulie in the revival of the musical Once on This Island (2009) and Gertrude, Queen of Denmark in the Royal Shakespeare Company's production of Hamlet (2018), with Paapa Essiedu in the title role.

Outside of acting, Brown has been a session singer with various bands and has worked with Gladys Knight, Courtney Pine, Eric Clapton, Lee "Scratch" Perry, Peter Andre and Terry Callier. She has also written, recorded and performed her own music.

== Filmography ==
=== Film ===
Year	Title	Role	Notes
2008	Little Soldier	Lily	Nominated for a Robert Award for Best Actress in a Supporting Role
2012	Gambit	Couple Wife	
2012	Les Misérables	Ensemble 'Lovely Ladies'	
2013	World War Z	Helen	Uncredited
2015	The Lady in the Van	Day Care Centre Worker	
2015	Taking Stock	Christina	
2018	Why Hide?	Anita	Released as Christmas Presence in the USA
2018	Mowgli: Legend of the Jungle	Wolf Elder	Voice
2019	Terminator: Dark Fate	US Border – Agent Brenner	
2020	Sulphur and White	Dr. Mbeke	
2022	The Batman	Doctor	

=== Television ===
Year	Title	Role	Notes
1993	The Bill	Anne Marie Winters	Episode: "Paid in Full"
1994	Anna Lee	Carol	Episode: "Diversion"
1995	Dangerfield	Sonia Hilliard	Episode: "Death in Custody"
1996	Casualty	Faith	Episode: "Made in Britain"
1997	The Bill	Karen Walsh	Episode: "Crime Management"
1998	The Bill	Emma	Episode: "Room to Manoeuvre"
1999	Murder Most Horrid	Woman in Office	Episode: "Elvis, Jesus and Zack"
1999	The Bill	Lauren	Episode: "Walking the Line"
2002	Holby City	Karen Barbour	Episode: "Long Day's Night"
2004	French and Saunders	PA	6 episodes
2005	ShakespeaRe-Told	Receptionist	Episode: "Much Ado About Nothing"
2006	The Catherine Tate Show	Amelia / Delivery Nurse	2 episodes
2007	Coronation Street	Consultant	2 episodes
2007	The Life and Times of Vivienne Vyle	Pregnant Make-up Artist	4 episodes
2008–2009	The Bill	Leanne Samuels	11 episodes
2009	Doctors	Tanya Cole	Episode: "Art of War"
2009	Nan's Christmas Carol	Nursing Home Carer	TV special
2011	Holby City	Sue Hodgson	Episode: "Walk the Line"
2011	Outnumbered	Miss Hartson	Episode: "The Parents' Evening"
2016	Holby City	Naomi Palmer	5 episodes
2017	Chewing Gum	Dr. Davine Solomon	Episode: "Age Ain't Nothing But a Number"
2017	Doctors	Mel Tolt	Episode: "Dynamics"
2017	Ill Behaviour	Loreta the Psychic	Episode #1.2
2017	Stella	Bebe	Episode #6.3
2018	Press	Carla Mason	Episode: "Death Knock"
2020	Trying	Samantha	Episode: "We Know the Way Out"
2020	Devils	Vicky Bale	9 episodes
2020	Soulmates	Nira	Episode: "The (Power) Ballad of Caitlin Jones"
2022	Hard Cell	Cal	6 episodes
2022	Vampire Academy	Janine Hathaway	3 episodes
2023	The Witcher	Eithné	2 episodes
2024	The Bay	D.C.I. Hardy	2 episodes

=== Stage ===
- Once on This Island (1994, 2009)
- Othello (1998)
- Up Against the Wall (1999)
- One Dance Will Do (2000)
- Funny Black Women on the Edge (2003)
- The Big Life (2004)
- The Cry of the Cricket (2005)
- Things of Dry Hours (2007)
- Short Fuses (2010)
- Clybourne Park (2010)
- Damned by Despair (2012)
- Crowning Glory (2013)
- Blurred Lines (2014)
- Medea (2014)
- Oresteia (2015)
- Wings (2017)
- Hamlet (2018)
- Two Ladies (2019)
