= Pappy & Harriet's =

Pappy & Harriet's Pioneertown Palace
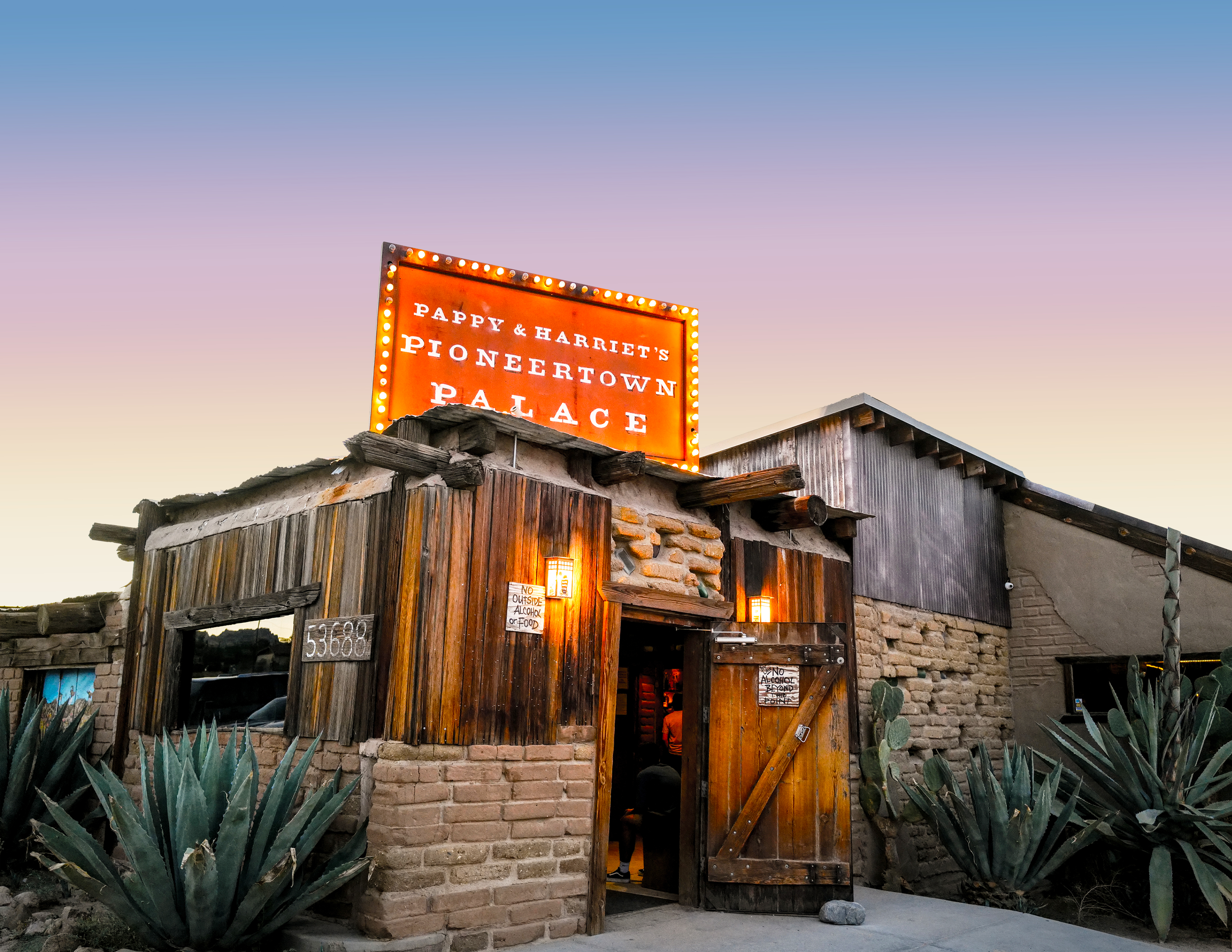
- Pappy and Harriet's in 2024
- Interactive map of Pappy & Harriet's Pioneertown Palace

Restaurant information
- Food type: Barbecue, Tex-Mex, American
- Location: 53688 Pioneertown Road, Pioneertown, San Bernardino County, California, 92268, United States
- Coordinates: 34.15638°N 116.49306°W
- Website: pappyandharriets.com

Pappy & Harriet's Pioneertown Palace is a western-themed, barbecue restaurant and music venue near Joshua Tree National Park in Pioneertown, California. Accessible from California State Route 62, the restaurant lies four miles northeast of Yucca Valley.

== 1946–1982 ==
In 1946, a group of filmmakers built a Western-style movie set in the high desert 25 miles north of Palm Springs for the cowboy actors Roy Rogers and Gene Autry. Production designers decorated the facades of "Main Street" with a Western saloon, bank, chapel and a cantina. Pioneertown and its cantina were used in more than 50 films and television programs throughout the 1940s and 1950s, including The Cisco Kid and Judge Roy Bean.

In 1972, Francis Aleba, Harriet Allen's mother, purchased the building and opened "The Cantina"; a bar known for serving burritos and attracting outlaw bikers. The establishment in this form operated for a decade before closing.

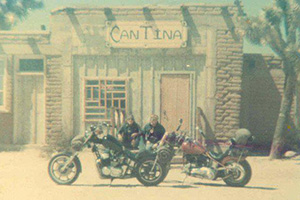
Pioneertown Cantina - Unknown Year

== 1982–2003 ==
In 1982, Harriet Allen and her husband, Claude "Pappy" Allen, purchased The Cantina and renamed it Pappy & Harriet's Pioneertown Palace. The venue offered a combination of Tex-Mex cuisine and live music, with performances often featuring Pappy, Harriet, and their granddaughter Kristina. It also became a popular stop for bikers traveling through the Mojave Desert corridor.

Harriet Allen was known for her cooking and occasional performances of country music standards, while Pappy Allen contributed to the venue’s construction and maintenance. The establishment developed a reputation for its welcoming atmosphere, attracting both locals and visitors to Joshua Tree National Park. Over time, Pappy & Harriet's gained wider recognition as a destination for food and live entertainment in the remote desert setting.

When Pappy Allen died in 1994, hundreds of mourners from around the world attended his memorial, including Victoria Williams, who later recorded the song "Happy to Have Known Pappy" for her Atlantic Records release, Loose.

A local airplane pilot, Jay Hauk, owned Pappy and Harriet's for a few years before it was next purchased.

== 2003–2021 ==
In 2003, Robyn Celia and Linda Krantz purchased Pappy & Harriet's. Longtime patrons and passionate music lovers, they revitalized the space and elevated its reputation as a premier destination for live music while staying true to the venue's roots. Under their 18-year stewardship, the stage welcomed an eclectic mix of world-renowned artists - from Paul McCartney and Robert Plant to Vampire Weekend, The Dandy Warhols and Queens Of The Stone Age, all while still embracing up-and-coming acts and underground artists alike.

In the summer of 2006, the Sawtooth Complex fire threatened Pappy & Harriet's and the rest of Pioneertown, but the town and club were not among the 50 homes and over 60,000 acres of desert burned.

Billboard Magazine named Pappy & Harriet's one of the Top Ten Hidden Gems in the Country in its 2012 Best Clubs issue. The club attracts artists and musicians from all over the world.

NY Times Magazine featured Pappy and Harriet's in its 2013 article "Listen Up | In The California Desert, A One Of A Kind Music Venue Blossoms".

SXSW featured the documentary The Pioneertown Palace in 2014.

Anthony Bourdain featured Pappy & Harriet's in the "US Desert" episode of his television show Anthony Bourdain: No Reservations.

Over these years, performers who appeared at Pappy & Harriet's included Paul McCartney, Eric Burdon, Eagles of Death Metal, Queens of the Stone Age, Rufus Wainwright, The Donnas, Grizzly Bear, Neko Case, Spiritualized, Lucinda Williams, Leon Russell, Arctic Monkeys, Daniel Lanois, Band of Horses, Alvvays, Sean Lennon, Billy Corgan and the Spirits in the Sky, Vampire Weekend, Wanda Jackson, Ricki Lee Jones, Lorde, and so many more. A surprise appearance by Robert Plant in early 2006 led to a jam with the Sunday evening house band, The Thrift Store All Stars, which featured Victoria Williams.

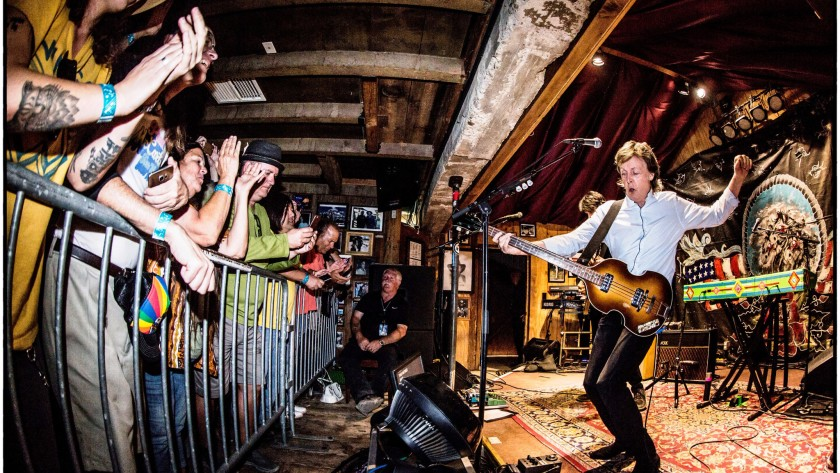
Paul McCartney At Pappy & Harriet's 2016

In 2014, Simian Mobile Disco performed/recorded their live album "Whorl" during a one-off set at Pappy & Harriet's. The set, a jam session in the desert, and a bit of studio work in London contributed to the final album.

Coachella Festival promoters Goldenvoice Productions and Santa Monica-based NPR station KCRW have presented shows at Pappy & Harriet's. The majority of bookings were generated by one of the club's former co-owners, Robyn Celia.

For a period of time, a Monday night Open Mic hosted by musician Ted Quinn featured hundreds of performers. Most of the Open Mic performers are local or lesser-known traveling troubadours, but many established artists, including Feist, Julie Christensen, and Ke$ha have also made appearances.

== 2021–Present ==
In 2021, after almost two decades of ownership, Robyn and Linda sold the business and property to Morgan Margolis, CEO of Knitting Factory & Partners, music curators Knitting Factory Ent. and their booking arm, Bravo Presents. Plaintiffs Morgan Margolis, John Chapman, S&H Desert Depot LLC of P&H Pioneertown LP LLC partners filed a lawsuit against JB Moresco and Lisa Elin of P&H Pioneertown GP LLC, which resulted in a 3.5-year legal battle. The plaintiffs ultimately prevailed, and a final takeover of the business and property occurred on December 23, 2024.

For a three-year period between 2021 and 2024, the name of the business was briefly spelled as "Pappy + Harriet's". The name has since been changed back to its original spelling using the ampersand. (Pappy & Harriet's).

Notable performances since 2021 include Slipknot, Phoenix, Interpol, Pretenders, Pete Yorn, Belle & Sebastian, Father John Misty, Orville Peck, Patti Smith, André 3000

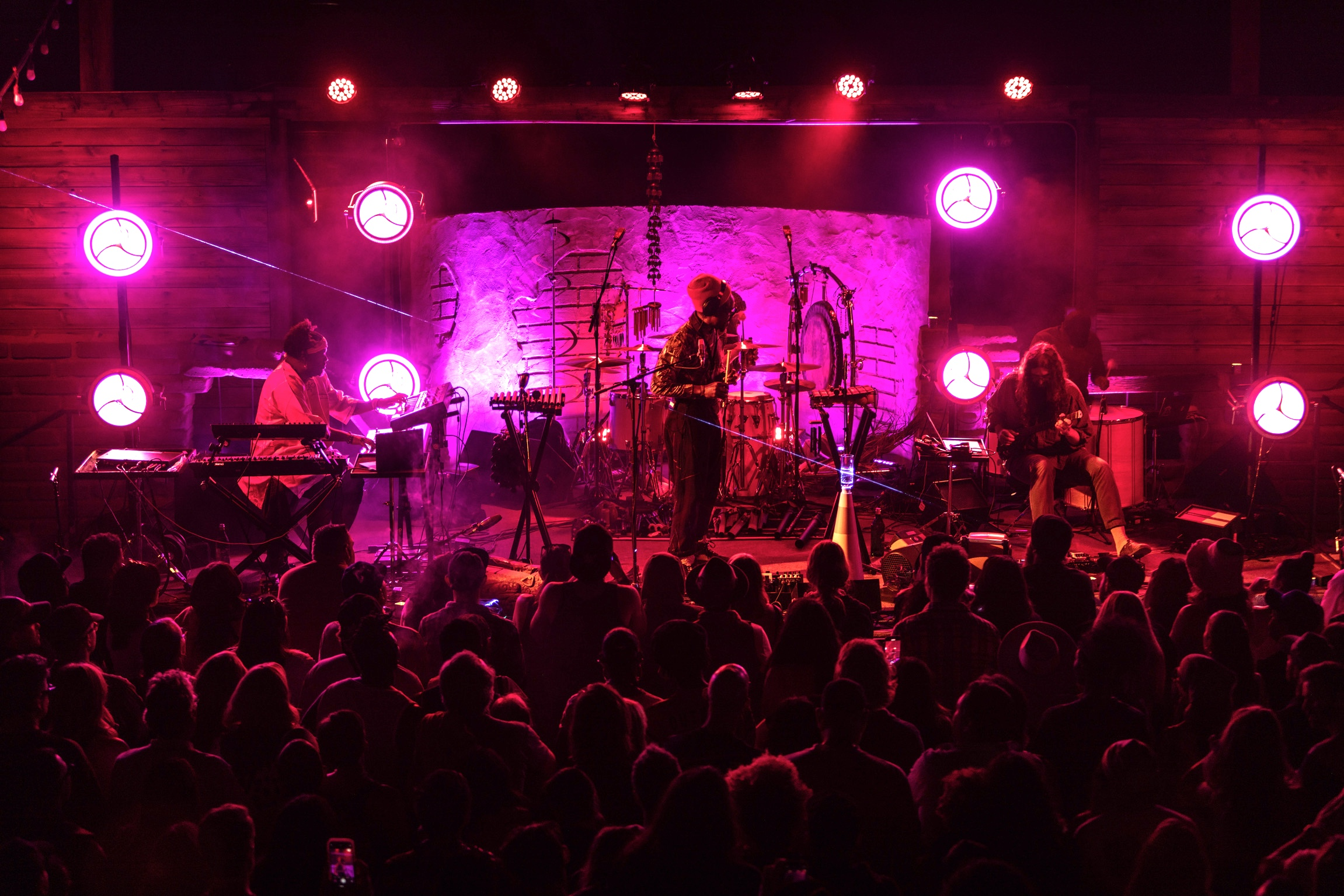
André 3000 Performing at Pappy & Harriet's 2024

Wynona Judd, Lukas Nelson and POTR, Modest Mouse, The Brian Jonestown Massacre, Rodrigo Amirante, Jim Lauderdale, Hermanos Gutiérrez featuring Dan Auerbach of The Black Keys, Tanya Tucker, David Lautrec and Desert Redux, Drive-By Truckers, Rosie Flores, Built To Spill, Melvins, Hawthorne Heights, Taking Back Sunday, Billy Bob Thornton, The Psychedelic Furs, Lucinda Williams, Dead Kennedy’s, Gregory Alan Isakov, Everclear, Son Volt, Ani Di Franco, Paul Cauthen, The Zombies, Coheed and Cambria and many others.

== In popular culture ==
The building that houses Pappy & Harriet's has been used as a set in many films and television programs from the 1940s to the present.

- As "The Cantina" (before its present name and use as a music venue), the location was used as a set in several Western-themed 1950s television shows including: The Cisco Kid, The Range Rider, The Gene Autry Show, Annie Oakley, and Judge Roy Bean.
- The 1953 movie, Jeopardy, starring Barbara Stanwyck, used The Cantina set.
- Howling: New Moon Rising was shot in and around Pappy & Harriet's and Pioneertown. The film featured many of the bar's regular customers as cast members.
- The restaurant is used as a location in the documentary Nowhere Now: The Ballad of Joshua Tree.
- Pappy & Harriet's appears in the 2012 Allison Anders-Kurt Voss film, Strutter.
- The restaurant is featured in Anthony Bourdain: No Reservations "US Desert" program with the rock musician Josh Homme of the band Queens of the Stone Age.
- Mentioned in the song "Mrs. Potter's Lullaby" by Counting Crows
- The restaurant is used as a location in the 2017 feature film Ingrid Goes West.
- Lucky Brand shot its Give Back campaign in Spring 2021 featuring solo artist, Goody Grace
- Arte.tv shot a segment for international television
- Wren Silva shot its hi-fi console campaign in October 2021 www.wrensilva.com
- Trixie Mattel and Orville Peck featured P+H in a "Trixie Motel" episode in October 2021
- Referenced in the show "Queens" on ABC by singer/songwriter Brandy as having been seen playing at Pappy + Harriet's in January 2022
- Seen in 2016 movie Lazy Eye as the main characters have lunch there
- Aly & AJ shot their new Music video for "With Love From" In March 2023

== See also ==
- Restaurant
- Honky Tonk
- Roadhouse
- BBQ
- Juke joint
- Public house
- Bar
- Tavern
- Nightclub
- Music Venue
