= Scot Williams =

English actor and producer

Scot Williams (born 29 November 1972), is an English actor, writer, and producer for stage, film and television.

== Early life ==
Williams is a native of Liverpool, Merseyside and grew up around Penny Lane, a street made famous by the Beatles song. He explained in 2014 that he wore trench coats and motorcycle boots as a young unknown actor, and would go to meet like-minded people, with a similar taste in fashion, at the Everyman theatre in Liverpool. Williams worked as an usher at the Everyman venue, selling ice creams for £8 per shift, but he states that his real payment was the ability to also see the theatrical performances. It was this early exposure to acting that served as a foremost inspiration for Williams's acting aspirations.

== Career ==
As an actor, Williams made his film debut in the 1994 Iain Softley film Backbeat, in which he played the role of the Beatles' original drummer Pete Best. Subsequently, he discovered that he was first cousin twice removed to the late Alun Owen, who in 1965 received an Academy Award nomination for his Beatles screenplay "A Hard Day's Night".

In 1995, Williams played the lead role of Shaun Caine in the Jonathan Harvey play Rupert Street Lonely Hearts Club. After a regional tour, the play transferred to London's Donmar Warehouse and then onto the Criterion Theatre, Piccadilly.

In 1996, Williams was offered the role of Joe Glover in the television drama Hillsborough television drama. Written by Jimmy McGovern, Hillsborough was based on the football stadium disaster of April 1989 in which 96 Liverpool F.C. supporters unlawfully died and was directed by the BAFTA and Emmy winning Charles McDougall. It went on to win dozens of awards around the world, including the 1997 Best Single drama BAFTA award.

In 1999 he played the role of 'Buddy' alongside Lisa Stansfield, Rita Tushingham and Alexei Sayle in the musical comedy Swing as well as the part of 'Patrick Callaghan' a one legged heroin addicted informer in the gritty crime drama Liverpool One.

2003-04 saw Williams feature in a trilogy of films written and directed by the iconic Peter Greenaway, called The Tulse Luper Suitcases. The first of which "The Moab Story" was an official selection for the Palme d'Or at the Cannes Film Festival. As well as a return to the stage in Chris Honer's award-winning production of the Arthur Miller classic "All My Sons" at Manchester's Library Theatre.

In 2005 Scot played the lead role of the American Art authenticator 'Patrick Donovan', alongside Rutger Hauer and Malcolm McDowell in the Venetian set thriller Tempesta and also in 2010 co-starred with Jesse Bradford, Sienna Guillory and Steven Berkoff in the horror film Perfect Life.

In 2009 he starred in Clubbed alongside Colin Salmon and Maxine Peake, playing the iconic bleached blonde lunatic 'Sparky' and in Adrian Vitoria's 'The Crew' (an adaptation of Kevin Sampson's novel "Outlaws") Scot played the lead role of 'Ged Brennen', a Liverpool gangster coming to terms with the changing face of crime. 2009 also saw Scot play the lead role of ex-Irish priest 'Sheamy O'Brien' in Maeve Murphy's "Beyond the Fire" alongside Cara Seymour. The film respectfully examined the loving relationship between two victims of sexual abuse and went on to win Best Film at the 2009 London Independent Film Awards. As well as this, Scot also popped up in the British gangster flick "Dead Man Running" alongside Tamer Hassan, Brenda Blethyn and 50 Cent.

Williams' latest film Hard Boiled Sweets is a slick noir thriller co-starring Ian Hart, Paul Freeman and Elizabeth Berrington and was to be released worldwide in 2011 by Universal Pictures.

For television Scot played the role of 'Father Melia' in the BBC's period drama series "Lilies". His other regular/returning TV roles have included 'Tom Tyrell in Showtime's Meadowlands (Cape Wrath for C4 in the UK), Neil Jones in the BBC's Nice Guy Eddie and Glen Freeman in BBC's Merseybeat.

Williams has also guested in many TV dramas, including Murder in Mind, Soldier Soldier, Heartbeat, Bliss, The Golden Collar, Helen West, In His Life: The John Lennon Story, Springhill, Casualty, Serious and Organised, Lock Stock..., Where The Heart Is, New Tricks and Holby City. In May 2020, he appeared in an episode of the BBC soap opera Doctors as Andy Dale.

As a writer he has notched up ten stage/screen plays to date, receiving one or two award nominations along the way. They are "Growing Young" (1992), "The Herd of Brutes" (1992), "Get Another Lover Mother" (1993), "The Plastic Daft" (1995), "Level Minus 99" (1995), "The Guilty Guessed" (1995), "Huggermugger" (1997), "Twenty Seven" (2005), "Stranger" (2008), "A Bard Day's Night/book" (2011), "Hope" (2013).

"A Bard Day's Night" is a comedy stage musical co-written alongside his Backbeat co-star Chris O'Neill. The show is currently in pre-production with a view to making its West End debut in 2012.

== Personal life ==
Williams has expressed great love for his home city of Liverpool and the foremost cultural aspects that it is famous for. He explains that his home city energises him and he almost feels like he returns to Liverpool to "steal its energy".

Williams is a passionate Beatles fan and explained their significance in April 2014: "It's almost tangible – that residual energy of what once was. As an artist, it really... it was inspirational. It really made you feel that you too could do it." He is also a devoted fan of the Liverpool Football Club and attended his first home match at the age of 10. Williams states that he is "privileged" to be a supporter of the club and recalls some of the "greatest nights" of his life spent at the Anfield stadium.
