= Cara Seymour =

English actress (born 1964)

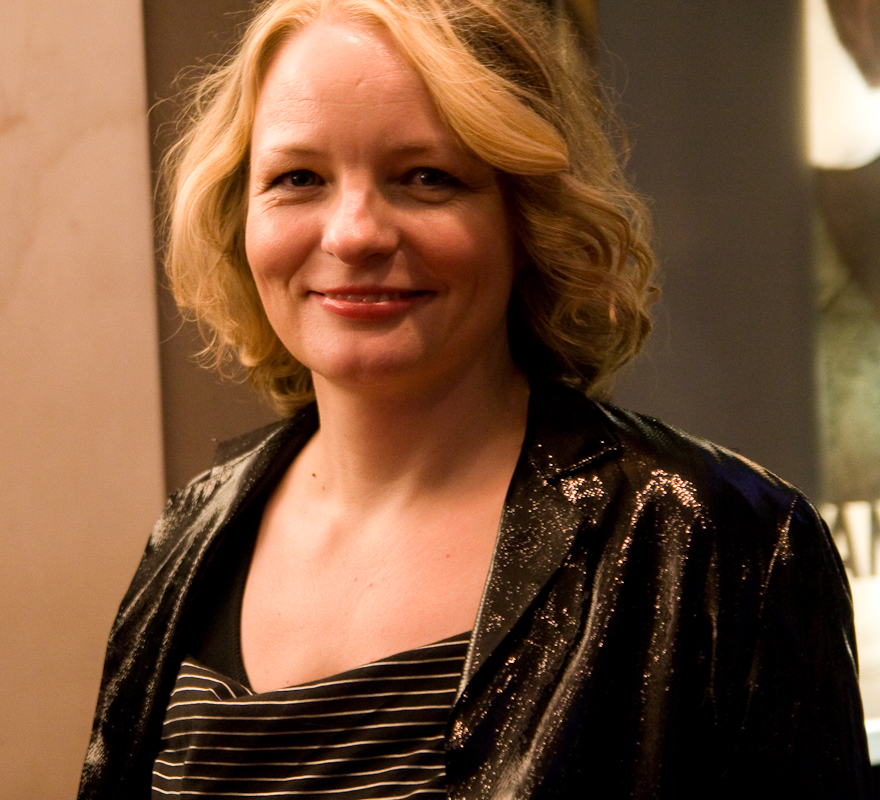
- Seymour in 2009.
- Born: 6 January 1964 (age 62); Essex, England, United Kingdom
- Occupation: Actress
- Years active: 1997–present

Cara Seymour (born 6 January 1964) is an English actress. She is known for roles in American Psycho, Dancer in the Dark, Gangs of New York, and the Cinemax television series The Knick.

== Career ==
Seymour performed on stage before gaining wider screen attention, including in the New York run of Mike Leigh's Ecstasy. By 2000, she had appeared American Psycho, Dancer in the Dark, and A Good Baby, and was filming Gangs of New York. Her later film credits include Hotel Rwanda, The Savages and An Education. She appeared on stage in the New York Shakespeare Festival production of Caryl Churchill's The Skriker.

She portrayed Sister Harriet in the Cinemax series The Knick.

== Filmography ==
=== Film ===
Year	Title	Role	Notes
1998	Come To	Mandy	Short film
1998	You've Got Mail	Gillian Quinn	
2000	American Psycho	Christie	
2000	Dancer in the Dark	Linda Houston	
2000	A Good Baby	Josephine Priddy	
2001	Silent Grace	Margaret	
2002	Adaptation	Amelia Kavan	Nominated—Phoenix Film Critics Society Award for Best Cast; Nominated—Screen Actors Guild Award for Outstanding Performance by a Cast in a Motion Picture
2002	Gangs of New York	Hell-Cat Maggie	
2004	Birth	Mrs. Conte	
2004	Evergreen	Kate	
2004	Hotel Rwanda	Pat Archer	
2005	Steal Me	Mother	
2006	The Notorious Bettie Page	Maxie	
2007	The Savages	Kasia	
2009	Beyond the Fire	Katie	
2009	An Education	Majorie	
2011	The Music Never Stopped	Helen Sawyer	
2012	Jack & Diane	Aunt Linda	
2014	I Origins	Dr. Jane Simmons	
2017	A Woman, a Part	Kate	
2018	Radium Girls	Wylie Stephens	
2023	Widow Clicquot	Jeanne Marie Posardin	
2025	I Live Here Now	Cindy	

=== Television ===
Year	Title	Role	Notes
2007	Oprah Winfrey Presents: Mitch Albom's for One More Day	Catherine Benetto	Television film
2009	Red Riding: The Year of Our Lord 1974	Mary Cole	Three part Channel 4 television series, released theatrically in the U.S.
2009	Red Riding: The Year of Our Lord 1983	Mary Cole	Three part Channel 4 television series, released theatrically in the U.S.
2013	Zero Hour	Mildred	Episode: "Ratchet"
2014–2015	The Knick	Sister Harriet	10 episodes Satellite Award for Best Cast – Television Series
2018	Bull	Heather	Episode: "Jury Duty"
