= The Catherine Tate Show series 3 =

The Catherine Tate Show
- Season 3
- No. of episodes: 6

Release
- Original network: BBC Two; BBC One (special)
- Original release: October 21 – November 25, 2006

Series chronology
- ← Previous; Series 2 Next → Nan

The third series of British television comedy sketch series The Catherine Tate Show premiered on BBC Two on 26 October 2006 and ended on 30 November 2006. This is the final series of the show; However a Christmas Special was broadcast on BBC One on 25 December 2007. Although this was the end to the sketch series, popular character Joannie 'Nan' Taylor began appearing in her own spin-off specials, beginning with Nan's Christmas Carol in 2009 and Catherine Tate's Nan from 2014.

In addition to the major characters of Series One and Series Two, new main character Geordie Georgie is introduced for the third series. New subsidiary characters include John Reilly's Mum, Ma Willow, Helen Marsh, Laura Powers, Snack Food Woman and the Frankie Howerd Impressionist.

Due to the high ratings success of the third series, peaking at 4.92 million viewers, the show was moved to BBC One for the 2007 Christmas Special and has remained on the channel from future specials.

== Characters ==
- Joannie 'Nan' Taylor: The foul-mouthed grandmother is an old East London woman who constantly swears at and criticises other people. She is always visited by her well-mannered grandson Jamie, where the visits usually start off well enough, with the Nan showing how grateful she is that her grandson has come to see her. However, things usually take a turn for the worse after she starts to make unfavourable comments about her neighbours, family, and home help visitors. Jamie is a university student, but according to Nan, is unemployed. Nan repeatedly asserts that he is gay, although Jamie has said on many occasions that he has a girlfriend. Regular performances by Catherine Tate and Mathew Horne.
- Lauren Cooper: Lauren Cooper is a comprehensive school student with a bad attitude who is most widely known for her phrase "Am I bovvered?". Lauren, her best friend Lisa 'Liese' Jackson and her love interest Ryan Perkins are known as yobs. Regular performances by Catherine Tate, Mathew Horne and Niky Wardley.
- Bernie: The incompetent Irish nurse. Bernie is an unruly, randy woman who bordered on being sacked in the hospital where she worked in every episode. She frequently makes inappropriate remarks to her patients, flirts with most of the male staff, takes a critically ill patient on a wild night out, and mixes up the records of living patients with those of deceased ones. Regular performance by Catherine Tate.
- Paul and Sam: The Essex couple. They are happily married yet slightly simple, and find everyday situations surprisingly hilarious. Paul and Sam often excitedly tell each other stories, which they find highly amusing and interesting. The stories build up and when completed, Paul and Sam would both produce an exaggerated and completely silent laugh. Regular performances by Catherine Tate and Lee Ross.
- Kate and Ellen: This sketch followed two office workers who sat next to each other. While Ellen is usually keen to get on with her work, she is frequently disturbed by Kate (Tate). Kate continually makes conversation about her lifestyle, inviting her co-worker to "Have a guess!" on such delicate situations. While Ellen is reluctant to go along with the guessing games, she is pressured into making a wild guess, which almost always results in Kate's becoming insulted and consequently offensive. Ellen occasionally guesses correctly, causing Kate to become angry and verbally or physically abuse her. Regular performances by Catherine Tate and Ella Kenion.
- Elaine Figgis: Elaine is a woman who appeared in a documentary following her search for love, mostly corresponding with people around the world via the Internet in search of a man. The unseen interviewer and narrator is called Tanya. follows her engagement and eventual marriage to a convicted cannibal and lunatic on Death Row in the US, who abducted, tortured and murdered eight people, proceeding to eat two of them. Regular performance by Catherine Tate and Rebecca Front as the voice of Tanya.
- The Aga Saga Woman: An upper-middle-class woman who goes into a state of shock in various, seemingly innocuous situations. Regular performance by Catherine Tate.
- Derek Faye: Derek, who first appeared in series two, is a man who shows several signs of being gay (combining some mannerisms of famous gay British comedians such as Kenneth Williams and Frankie Howerd), but seems to be in denial about his sexuality and becomes extremely offended and defensive when people assume he is gay. To his dislike, these occurrences are frequent because he behaves in an extremely effeminate way. His most famous catchphrase is "How very dare you!", along with the overuse of the word "dear". This can be seen in another catchphrase; when asked about his sexuality he replies "Who, dear? Me, dear? Gay, dear? No, dear!", or when asked for advice replying "Me, dear? Advice, dear? Yes, dear." When offended, Derek states how he and his mother have been doing something relative to the person Derek is insulted by for 25 years. Regular performer includes Catherine Tate.
- Irene and Vernon: Irene (whose accent suggests that she is an East Londoner of Maltese origins) and the ever silent Vernon (often referred to as Vern) first appeared in series two. They are the owners of a mobile burger van situated on the side of a motorway. During their sketches they are visited by a regular customer called Neville whom Irene tries to convince that she and Vernon have been visited by various celebrities. In Series 3, their apparent visitors include Condoleezza Rice, ABBA, and Henry VIII. Neville almost always orders a double cheese with no sauce, and keeps a tab with Irene and Verne and always asks if he can "settle up on Friday." When Neville appears, Irene never knows the name of the celebrity in question and always attempts to describe them. Regular performers include Catherine Tate, Aschlin Ditta and Brian Murphy.
- Janice and Ray: A racist, xenophobic Northern couple, who express their disgust at meals they have been presented with at restaurants, usually based on either perceived over-pricing or the exotic nature of the food. They are also shown to be frustrated by the availability of such items in their locality, owing to comments such as "This were in Harrogate." After complaining about the food and prices, they use their most infamous catchphrase: "The dirty bastards!" or sometimes "The dirty, evil, robbing bastards!"
- Geordie Georgie: A frequent petitioner, who constantly tries to get her co-worker, Martin, to sponsor her charities with facts such as "Every 38 minutes ..." then follows her statements up with "If you don't believe me then log on to the website ...". The scenes for this sketch follow the same pattern. Georgie comes into the office and starts singing happily, with Martin joining in, and then she asks Martin how his weekend went. Martin then talks about his daughter Michaela which would prompt Georgie to feel concerned about her but then begin to talk abusively about her. Georgie then requests to borrow something on Martin's desk, for example "can I borrow your nice lime green highlighter?" She then describes her and 'the girls' latest fund-raising effort and asks him to sponsor her. He always offers a modest donation then makes at least one small increase, but after several futile attempts to get him to donate yet more money, she says "Let's say no more about it because I wouldn't want it to come between us pet". She then attacks him in a manner that has something to do with the cause she was championing.

== Episodes ==
No. overall	No. in series	Title	Directed by	Written by	Original release date	UK viewers (millions)
14	1	"Episode 1"	Gordon Anderson	Catherine Tate, Aschlin Ditta & Gordon Anderson	26 October 2006	4.81
1. Lauren - Billy's Burger Bar; 2. The Aga Saga Woman - Sports Day; 3. John Reilly's Mum; 4. Old Woman - Tommy and Dolly; 5. Helen Marsh - Tennis; 6. John Reilly's Mum; 7. Geordie Georgie - Battered Husbands; 8. John Reilly's Mum; 9. Helen Marsh - Curling; 10. John Reilly's Mum; 11. Old Woman - Visiting a Friend in Hospital; 12. Helen Marsh - Translator; 13. John Reilly's Mum
15	2	"Episode 2"	Gordon Anderson	Catherine Tate, Aschlin Ditta & Gordon Anderson	2 November 2006	4.25
1. Derek Faye - Homolulu; 2. Lauren - Cheerleading; 3. Irene and Vern - Condoleezza Rice; 4. Ma Willow; 5. Helen Marsh - Salsa Dancing; 6. Geordie Georgie - Sexual Harassment in the Workplace; 7. Ma Willow; 8. Helen Marsh - Drums; 9. Old Woman - Mouse; 10. Lauren - Cheerleading
16	3	"Episode 3"	Gordon Anderson	Catherine Tate, Aschlin Ditta & Gordon Anderson	9 November 2006	4.92
1. Old Woman - Scottish Lady; 2. Elaine Figgis - Baby/1; 3. Geordie Georgie - OCD; 4. Janice and Ray - Gazpacho; 5. Elaine Figgis - Baby/2; 6. Bernie - Siblings; 7. Elaine Figgis - Baby/3; 8. Derek Faye - Bonnie Langford; 9. Elaine Figgis - Baby/4; 10. Lauren - Proposal; 11. Elaine Figgis - Karaoke
17	4	"Episode 4"	Gordon Anderson	Catherine Tate, Aschlin Ditta & Gordon Anderson	16 November 2006	4.00
1. Geordie Georgie - Alcoholics; 2. Laura Powers; 3. Derek Faye - Wedding; 4. Sandra Kemp - Gingers For Justice; 5. Laura Powers; 6. Irene and Vern - ABBA; 7. The Aga Saga Woman - Mechanic; 8. Bernie - Slang; 9. Laura Powers; 10. Lauren - Science Teacher; 11. Laura Powers; 12. Sandra Kemp - Gingers For Justice
18	5	"Episode 5"	Gordon Anderson	Catherine Tate, Aschlin Ditta & Gordon Anderson	23 November 2006	4.06
1. Lauren - French Oral Exam; 2. Snack Food Woman - Nik Naks/Building Collapse; 3. Frankie Howerd Impressionist; 4. Geordie Georgie - Sex Addiction; 5. The Aga Saga Woman - Tottenham; 6. Janice and Ray - Charity Coffee Morning; 7. Snack Food Woman - Monster Munch/Shooting; 8. Derek Faye - Urinal; 9. Janice and Ray - Jellied Eels; 10. Irene and Vern - Henry VIII; 11. Snack Food Woman - Mini Cheddars/Shark Attack; 12. Old Woman - The Paul O'Grady Show
19	6	"Episode 6"	Gordon Anderson	Catherine Tate, Aschlin Ditta, Gordon Anderson & Jonathan Harvey	30 November 2006	4.15
1. Lauren - Wedding; 2. Janice and Ray - No-Bread Sandwich; 3. Derek Faye - Massage; 4. Geordie Georgie - Dwarves; 5. Paul and Sam - Mobile Phone; 6. Geordie Georgie - Martin's Fundraiser; 7. The Aga Saga Woman - Gooseberry and Cinnamon Yoghurt; 8. Paul and Sam - Earring; 9. Janice and Ray - Sushi; 10. Old Woman - Sister (Guest Starring Sheila Hancock)
Special
20	–	"Christmas Special"	Gordon Anderson	Catherine Tate, Derren Litten, Mathew Horne & Aschlin Ditta	25 December 2007	6.75
Bernie the nurse invites a famous patient to the karaoke party, Lauren spits some lyrics and learns to kayak, whilst Nan invites her daughter and new boyfriend over for Christmas dinner. Guest starring Tamzin Outhwaite, Kellie Bright, George Michael, Nitin Ganatra, Philip Glenister and Kathy Burke.

== Release ==
=== Reception ===
No.	Title	Air date	Timeslot	UK viewers (millions)	Rank	Ref(s)
1	Episode 1	26 October 2006	Thursday 9.00pm	4,810,000	1	
2	Episode 2	2 November 2006	Thursday 9.00pm	4,250,000	1	
2	Episode 3	9 November 2006	Thursday 9.00pm	4,920,000	1	
4	Episode 4	16 November 2006	Thursday 9.00pm	4,000,000	2	
5	Episode 5	23 November 2006	Thursday 9.00pm	4,060,000	1	
6	Episode 6	30 November 2006	Thursday 9.00pm	4,150,000	1	
7	Christmas Special	25 December 2007	Tuesday 10.30pm	6,750,000	17	

=== Accolades ===
British Academy Television Awards

- —Nominated: BAFTA Award for Best Make Up & Hair Design (Vanessa White & Neill Gorton)
- —Nominated: BAFTA Award for Best Comedy Programme (Catherine Tate, Geoffrey Perkins, Aschlin Ditta & Gordon Anderson)

National Television Awards

- National Television Award for Most Popular Comedy Programme (The Catherine Tate Show)

British Comedy Awards

- —Nominated: British Comedy Award for Best TV Comedy Actress (Catherine Tate)

=== Home media ===
"Series Three" was released on DVD on region 2 in the United Kingdom on 12 November 2007 from 2 Entertain distribution. A boxset comprising "Complete Series One, Two and Three was additionally released on 17 November 2007. "The Catherine Tate Show: Christmas Special" was made available on DVD on 26 December 2007, a day following its broadcast.

On region 4 in Australia, "Series Three" was released on DVD on 30 June 2008 and includes the 2007 Christmas Special, which was not made available as a single DVD edition. The third series, with the Christmas Special, was again released as part of "Complete Series One, Two and Three" box set on 2 April 2009.

== Future episodes ==
Following the conclusion of the original sketch series, The Catherine Tate Show returned in 2009 with a spin-off Christmas Special titled "Nan's Christmas Carol" in which the character of Joannie 'Nan' Taylor only appeared, while spoofing A Christmas Carol. "Catherine Tate's Nan" is now established as the first episode of Christmas and New Year Specials titled "Catherine Tate's Nan" (or simply "Nan"). 2014 saw the return of Nan Taylor as she is accompanied by school girl, Alice, who makes frequent visits as part of the 'Young and Old Buddy-Up Foundation', while her grandson, Jamie, is in Africa building a school for orphans and makes regular contact with Nan via Skype. While Nan, accompanied by Alice, is on a mission to have her kitchen tap fixed, insisting the help of the council, she lands herself in trouble for 'disturbing the peace' and must serve community service. Two further "Nan" specials broadcast in December 2015; the first with Nan being forced to attend anger management classes and the second with Nan fighting against a group of property developers who have bought the block of flats which she lives in.
