= The Laura Crane Youth Cancer Trust =

British health charity

The Laura Crane Youth Cancer Trust is a charity based in Huddersfield, West Yorkshire. The charity supports young patients and funds research into cancers affecting those aged between 13 and 24.

== History ==
The charity was registered in 1996 by Jacquie Roeder who set up the charity after her daughter, Laura Crane, died from cancer. The charity’s registration number is 1138003.

== Research funded ==
- 2004 – Long term cancer survival: Models of Follow-up; Evidence and impact of late effects – Weston Park Hospital, Sheffield
- 2006 - The influence of the Epstein Barr Virus on Chemotherapy Response in Hodgkin’s Lymphoma – University of Birmingham
- 2012 - Research into treatment for young people with Ovarian and Testicular cancer
- 2014 – Multi-tumour brain and nervous system cancer which affects teenagers and young adults – Research into a drug-based treatment

== Support ==
The charity supports young patients and aims to improve their quality of life. One of their main campaigns is to send Christmas gifts to patients spending Christmas Day in hospital. The charity also funds laptop libraries to hospitals nationwide.

== Awards and achievements ==
- 2000 – Received Gold Award in the BBC Look North’s Charity Champions
- 2000 – Jacquie Roeder named person of the year by Huddersfield Daily Examiner and Huddersfield Pride Millennium Community Awards
- 2000 – adopted for three years by Outfit, part of Arcadia Group.
- 2003/04 – Jacquie received the Beacon Prize two years in a row for her contribution to charitable and social causes
- 2005 – Jacquie Roeder received a Paul Harris Fellowship from Rotary International
- 2006 – Jacquie Roeder was named Local Hero by both Home 107.9 FM and Pulse Radio
- 2006 – Received National Lottery funding through Awards for All.
- 2006 – Jacquie Roeder is named Tesco’s Mum of the Year
- 2006 – Pass the Parcel Ltd volunteered to deliver Christmas gifts

== Celebrity involvement ==
Catherine Tate is the current patron. The charity ambassadors are Keith Senior and Andy Raleigh. Past patrons have included Zöe Lucker and Jack Dee.
