= Queen of Oz =

British television series

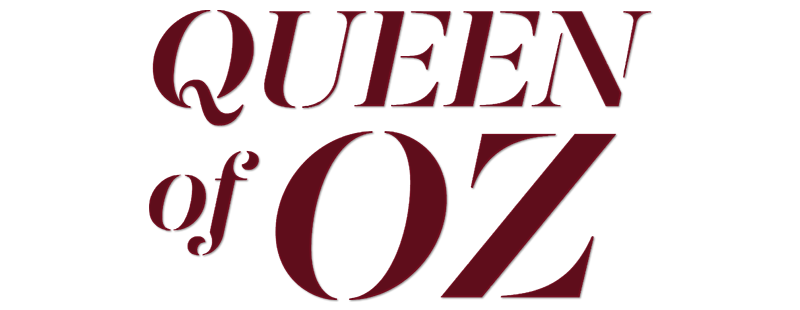
- Genre: Sitcom; Political satire; Cringe comedy
- Developed by: Catherine Tate; Jeff Gutheim; Jason Stephens; Zoe Norton Lodge
- Written by: Catherine Tate; Jeff Gutheim; Zoe Norton Lodge; Aschlin Ditta
- Story by: Borga Dorter
- Directed by: Christiaan Van Vuuren
- Starring: Catherine Tate; Niky Wardley; Robert Coleby; William McKenna; Rob Collins; Anthony Brandon Wong; Jenna Owen; Rachel Gordon
- Countries of origin: United Kingdom; Australia
- Original language: English
- No. of series: 1
- No. of episodes: 6

Production
- Executive producers: Catherine Tate; Jeff Gutheim; Helen Bowden; Ben Caudell; Borga Dorter; Jordan Barker; Jason Stephens; Robert Taylor
- Producer: Michele Bennett
- Production location: Australia
- Running time: 26–29 minutes
- Production company: Lingo Pictures

Original release
- Network: BBC One
- Release: 16 June – 21 July 2023

Queen of Oz is a television sitcom developed by and starring Catherine Tate as the scandalous Queen Georgiana, a disgraced member of a fictional British royal family sent to rule Australia. The first series, consisting of six episodes, co-written by Tate and Jeff Gutheim, produced by Michele Bennett and directed by Christiaan Van Vuuren, premiered on BBC One and BBC iPlayer on 16 June 2023, and in Australia on ABC TV and ABC iview on 21 June 2023. The show was cancelled by the BBC after one series.

== Plot ==
The sitcom follows Princess Georgiana (Catherine Tate), the black sheep of a fictional British royal family who has spent her spoilt life partying and being plastered all over the tabloids. In the wake of her latest scandal, her mother, the Queen, takes the unprecedented step of abdicating her Australian throne in favour of her daughter, hoping that some real responsibilities will make her come to her senses.

== Cast and characters ==
=== Main ===
- Catherine Tate as Georgiana: A scandalous "spare" princess to the British throne carted off to be Queen of Australia, who deals with the responsibilities of monarchy and forced marriage.
- Niky Wardley as Anabel: A scatterbrained cousin of Georgiana, who is also her lady-in-waiting, and is almost no help to her.
- Robert Coleby as Bernard: A cool and collected private secretary of the Queen, who came out of retirement due to his hatred of his wife and being the only staff member loyal to the royal family enough to move to Australia with Georgiana.
- William McKenna as Matthew/Craig: A wimpy personal assistant who is very nervous around the Queen, and has small hands.
- Rob Collins as Marc Kemarre: A head security officer accompanying the Queen, with whom she often talks openly about her life.
- Anthony Brandon Wong as Weiwei Weng: A sarcastic Master of the Household who treats the Queen with contempt and tends to care more about the furniture and the house than the people inside.
- Jenna Owen as Zoe: A usually composed director of communications who is constantly trying to improve the Queen's popularity and public relations.
- Rachel Gordon as Rebecca Stewart: A republican Australian prime minister, unimpressed with the Queen, and annoyed at her endless complaining.

=== Recurring ===
- Rodger Corser as Teddy Anderson: A zookeeper and philanthropist related to a Danish prince, who meets Georgiana when she visits his zoo and later gets betrothed to her.
- Daniel Lapaine as Frederick: Georgiana's prince brother and the heir to the British throne, who has a hostile relationship with his sister and, despite being loved by the public, is a sanctimonious and pompous man, only eager to please his parents.
- David Roberts as Richard Steele: A media magnate who likes to put celebrities in the spotlight by covering and creating endless scandals on Steele News.
- Lynette Curran as Sylvia: Teddy's mother, who is quite batty and gets scared whenever someone enters a room, and has a therapy dog.

The series also has numerous cameos by radio and television presenters including Carol Vorderman, Greg James, Zoe Ball, Patrick Kielty, Emma Alberici, Dave Hughes, Amanda Keller, Brendan Jones and Sarah Macdonald. Series director Christiaan Van Vuuren makes a cameo appearance as tech billionaire John Frusctaine in the fifth episode.

== Episodes ==
No.	Title	Directed by	Written by	Original release date	UK viewers (millions)
1	"There's a New Queen in Town"	Christiaan Van Vuuren	Catherine Tate & Jeff Gutheim	16 June 2023	1.40
After her latest public scandal, Princess Georgiana is sent off to Australia to become their new monarch, along with her new staff, Bernard, Zoe, Matthew, Weiwei and Anabel.
2	"Ginger Eyebrows"	Christiaan Van Vuuren	Catherine Tate & Jeff Gutheim	23 June 2023	0.85
Georgie's excitement about appearing on a new Australian $5 note is ruined by a very unflattering portrait. She tries to get the bank to change it, but it would cost millions, so it remains her portrait. Meanwhile, she attempts to charm media magnate Richard Steele (David Roberts) by inviting him to join her on the hunt, after a spot of dinner, alongside his mother.
3	"Royal Tinder"	Christiaan Van Vuuren	Catherine Tate & Jeff Gutheim	30 June 2023	0.71
Prince Frederick (Daniel Lapaine), the heir apparent to the British throne and Georgie's golden child brother, arrives unexpectedly from London with some distressing news from their parents: Georgie needs to get married. After visiting an animal sanctuary, she meets the owner, who turns out to be related to a Danish prince, and decides if she has to marry someone, it should be him.
4	"They Used to Oink at Me"	Christiaan Van Vuuren	Catherine Tate, Jeff Gutheim, Zoe Norton Lodge & Aschlin Ditta	7 July 2023	0.39
After meeting Teddy's batty old mother Sylvia, Georgie stumbles into her former school bully Jessica, and decides to organise a dinner for her so that she can revel in Jessica's life struggles since they last spoke. Georgie ruins the dinner by reigniting their feud and causing Jessica to go into labour. When Jessica later threatens to leak the dinner to the press, Georgie apologises, and Jessica relents that life hasn't been easy for her either.
5	"Emu Meat"	Christiaan Van Vuuren	Catherine Tate & Jeff Gutheim	14 July 2023	N/A
All the talk at Macquarie House is about the upcoming wedding, and Georgie wants to get away from it all, so Marc is forced to take her to his family, who are hosting a surprise party for Marc's cousin. Back at the house, Matthew (whose real name was revealed to be Craig), Zoe, Anabel, Weiwei and Bernard realise Georgie is gone, so they also have a party with drinking games (in which Bernard would not partake). The Queen also promised to talk to Sylvia, but Anabel leaves the party and recounts her place in the line of succession, constantly forgetting names. Later, Georgie falls asleep in with Bernard, after a long long day.
6	"I'm Not Marrying a Gorm"	Christiaan Van Vuuren	Catherine Tate & Jeff Gutheim	21 July 2023	N/A
On the day of the royal wedding, the Australian public is ecstatic to see two royals married; Georgie persuades Teddy to change his middle name from Gorm. The team are working around the clock to make the wedding special, but when the time comes, the horses meant to be pulling the carriage have herpes, and so Georgie is taken in an SUV, to be walked down the aisle by her annoying brother Freddie, much to Georgie's dismay. However, before she completes her vows, Teddy collapses, and later dies, due to a Tahini Wrap prepared by Weiwei from which he took a bite which contained sesame seeds. There was no epinephrine in his injector, partially due to Georgie's "self-medicating". However, when Georgie thinks she has truly hit rock bottom, the public support her and the team, and they celebrate the good PR, but "think about Teddy" at the same time.

== Production ==
=== Conception and development ===
Catherine Tate first began developing the idea for the sitcom in 2017, after being approached by Canadian producer Borga Dorter. Initially, it was supposed to be set in Canada and was unsuccessfully pitched to local broadcasters as Queen of Canada. Tate then decided to move the setting to Australia after touring there with The Catherine Tate Show in late 2018.

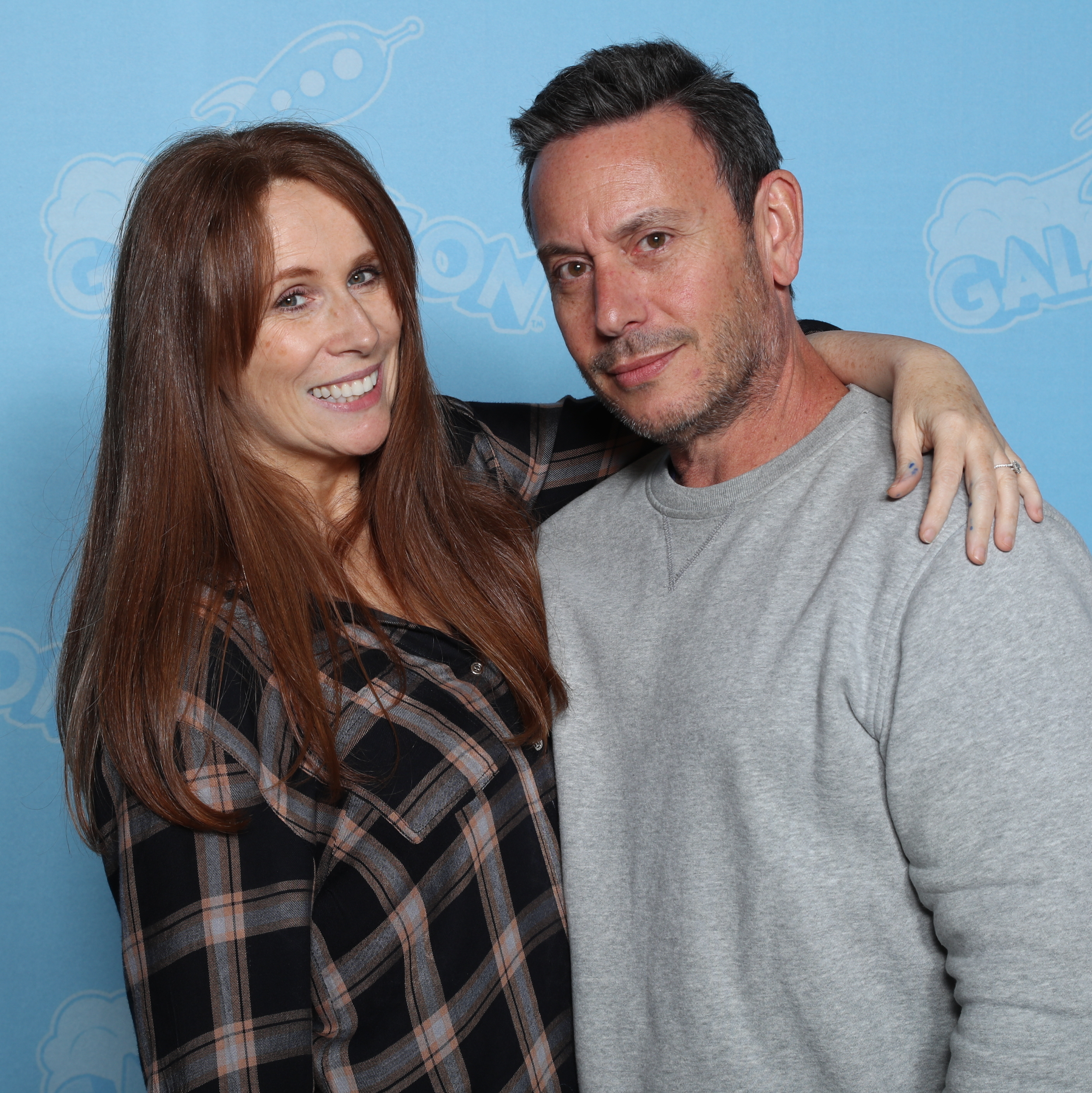
Tate co-wrote the series with American screenwriter Jeff Gutheim

Queen of Oz was one of a number of commissions announced at the BBC's annual Edinburgh International Television Festival panel on 25 August 2022. It was reported that the six-part sitcom, written by Tate and Jeff Gutheim and directed by Christiaan Van Vuuren, will be produced by the Australian production company Lingo Pictures and filmed at the end of 2022. Producer Michele Bennett described Queen of Oz as a "fabulously witty series" and a "riotous take on royalty in Australia".

=== Filming ===
Swifts mansion, where much of the series was filmed

The production began in Australia in September 2022. In October, the talent agency MCTV specified that the filming was taking place in Sydney. Much of the series was filmed on location at Swifts, a 19th century mansion in Darling Point, which doubled as the fictional Macquarie House, Queen Georgiana's official Australian residence. Some scenes of the second episode were shot in the middle of the Australian bush.

At the end of November, several members of the production team made social media posts with the phrase "That's a wrap", indicating the end of filming. Additional scenes, including the street interview-style footage, were shot in February 2023, with post-production eventually ending in April.

== Release ==
In the UK, all six episodes were released on BBC iPlayer on 16 June 2023, with the first episode airing on BBC One later that day. On 7 July, the fourth episode was moved to BBC Two because of Wimbledon. In Australia, the series premiered on ABC TV and ABC iview on 21 June 2023.

== Reception ==
=== Critical response ===
In her three-star review, Lucy Mangan of The Guardian said that Queen of Oz is "a solidly written" and "well-constructed" series with "lots of callbacks within each episode, and nicely drawn relationships among the main and peripheral characters". Although she didn't find the show "spectacularly funny", she concluded that it is "extraordinarily watchable" and praised the performances of Tate, Rob Collins and Robert Coleby. She described the main character as "truly and refreshingly monstrous" and called her a middle-aged version of Lauren Cooper crossed with Nan and Princess Margaret.

A four-star review from Kylie Northover of The Sydney Morning Herald also praised Tate's performance, while describing it as a "mostly silly fun" show that "occasionally veers into darker comedy while still feeling, at times, old-fashioned". Ben Pobjie of the same newspaper found that Queen of Oz is "really a damn good show", describing Tate's acting as "brilliant" and claiming that she and the show's co-writers have "crafted the scripts superbly" resulting in what is "surely the best new local comedy of the year".

In a less favourable, one-star review from The Daily Telegraph, Anita Singh called the series "desperate and lazy", criticising Tate and her central character for not being "remotely likeable" and favouring "far funnier" supporting performances, especially from Niky Wardley. In a three-star review, the Daily Mail's Sarah Vine said "there is some good stuff here, not least the supporting cast of characters, which are funny and well-written", and proclaimed that Tate "remains one of the few TV comedians who still dares to push people's buttons".

=== Accolades ===
Year	Award	Category	Nominee	Result	Ref.
2023	The Comedy.co.uk Awards	Best New TV Sitcom	Queen of Oz	Won	
2023	Australian Screen Editors Ellie Awards	The Solid State Award for Best Editing in Comedy	Mathew Evans (Episode: "I'm Not Marrying a Gorm")	Nominated	
