= Catherine Tate =

British actress, comedian and writer (born 1969)

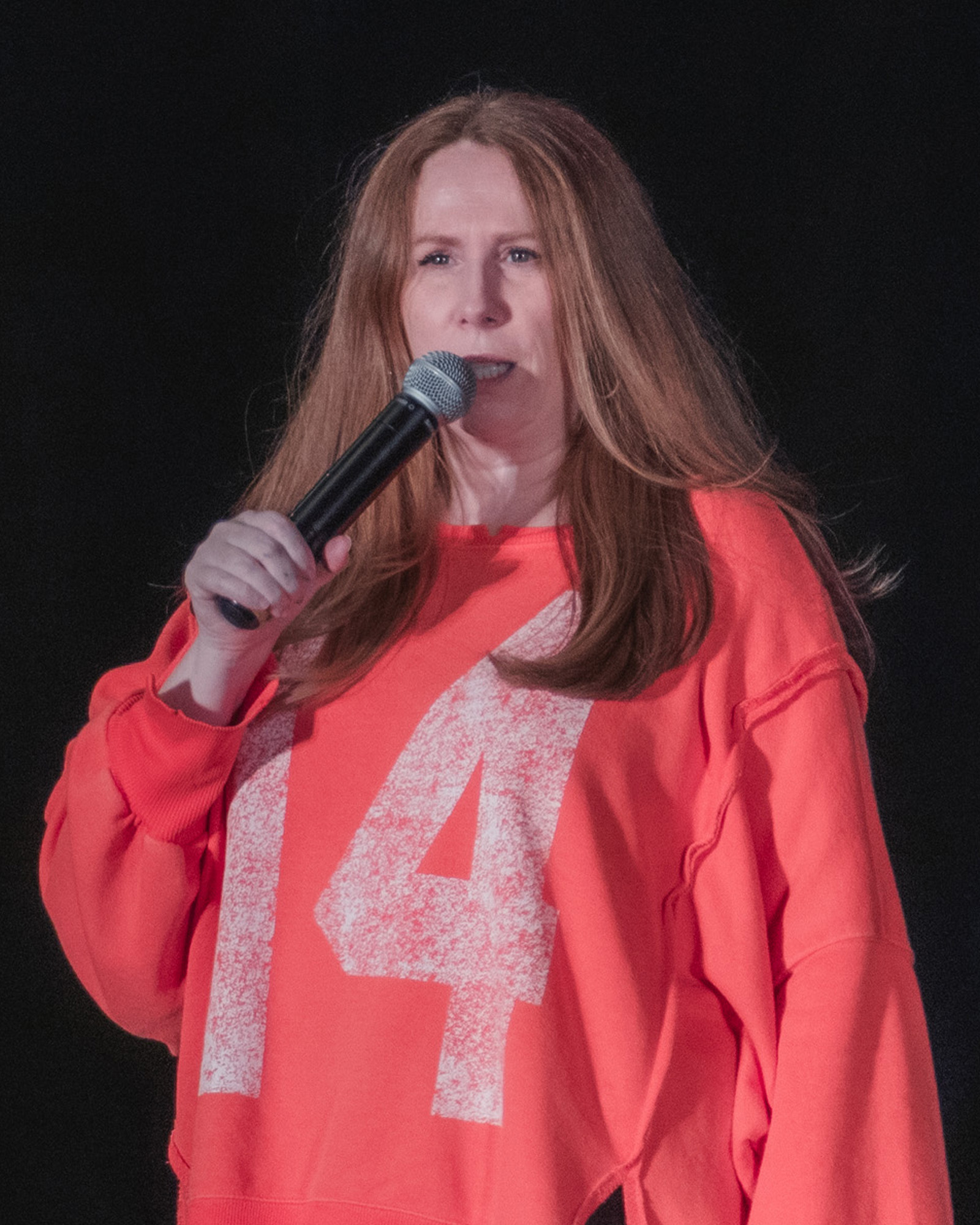
- Tate in 2025
- Born: Catherine Jane Ford; 5 December 1969 (age 56); Bloomsbury, London, England
- Education: Notre Dame High School, Southwark; Royal Central School of Speech and Drama
- Occupations: Actress; comedian; writer
- Years active: 1991–present
- Spouse: Jeff Gutheim (m. 2019)
- Children: 1
- Catherine Tate's voice from the BBC Radio 4 programme Front Row, 5 April 2016

Catherine Tate (born Catherine Jane Ford, 5 December 1969) is an English actress, comedian and writer. She has won numerous awards for her work on the BBC sketch comedy series The Catherine Tate Show (2004–2007), as well as being nominated for an International Emmy Award and seven British Academy Television Awards. Tate played Donna Noble in the 2006 Christmas special of the BBC science fiction series Doctor Who, and reprised her role for the fourth series in 2008, and the 60th anniversary episodes in 2023.

Following the success of The Catherine Tate Show, Tate starred as Joanie Taylor ("Nan") in its spin-off series Catherine Tate's Nan (2009–2015) and in the film The Nan Movie (2022). In 2011, she began a recurring role as Nellie Bertram in the U.S. version of the sitcom The Office and was a regular until the series ended. She played the role of Miss Sarah Postern in the BBC One sitcom Big School (2013–2014) and voiced Magica De Spell in the Disney Channel animated series DuckTales (2017–2021). In the 2020s, Tate created and starred in two sitcoms, Netflix's Hard Cell (2022) which she also co-directed, and BBC One's Queen of Oz (2023).

== Early life ==
Tate was born in Bloomsbury, London, on 5 December 1969 (Note: Attributed to multiple sources:) and was raised in the Brunswick Centre. Her mother, Josephine, was a florist. Tate has said that the character of Margaret in The Catherine Tate Show, who shrieks at the slightest of disturbances, is based largely on her mother. Tate never knew her father as he left very early on in her life and, consequently, she was brought up in a female-dominated environment, being cared for by her mother, grandmother, and godparents. As a child, Tate had obsessive-compulsive disorder (OCD) and was obsessed with word association. For example, she was not able to leave a jumper on the floor because it might have brought misfortune to her mother, whose name began with the letter "J" like "jumper".

Tate attended St Joseph's Roman Catholic Primary School in Holborn, and Notre Dame High School, a convent secondary school for girls in Southwark. By the time she was a teenager, she knew she wanted a professional acting career; following the abolition of the sixth form at her secondary school, she was sent to a boys' Roman Catholic school, Salesian College in Battersea, at the age of 16, as it had the necessary facilities for drama. She left school without sitting her A levels. She then tried for four years to get a place in the Central School of Speech and Drama, succeeding on her fourth attempt. She studied there for three years. Prior to getting a place there, Tate went to the Sylvia Young Theatre School, but left after a week, later stating, "Even at that age, I realised I wasn't Bonnie Langford. It was very competitive." She was also a member of the National Youth Theatre.

Born Catherine Ford, she changed her name when she got her Equity card as an actress. She chose her new surname after the character of Jessica Tate, played by Katherine Helmond, from the American sitcom television series Soap.

== Career ==
=== 1988–2003: Early acting and stand-up career ===
From 1988 to 1990 Tate toured with the National Youth Theatre production of Blood Wedding, which also starred Daniel Craig and Jessica Hynes. In 1994, she got the part of Lydia Lubey in the Oxford Stage Company production of Arthur Miller's All My Sons. She then worked at the Royal National Theatre, playing small roles in The Way of the World (1995) and The Prince's Play (1996). Tate also performed with the Royal Shakespeare Company during its 10-month tour across the UK, Australia and the US with Lee Hall's adaptation of The Servant of Two Masters (2000–2001).

Her television acting career began with roles in serial dramas such as The Bill and London's Burning. Her debut happened in an episode of the sitcom Surgical Spirit in 1991. She was offered an audition for the part by the casting director who also owned a sandwich shop Tate used to go in and knew she was about to go to drama college. On the set, she got to work with actor Duncan Preston, of whom she was a big fan.

"[I] did a lot of stage work. I'd always wanted to do comedy, but it was the '90s and they were closing a lot of the repertory theatres. The closest thing I saw to stage work was stand-up, so I took the stand-up route and went to the Edinburgh Festival and did things like that. My journey through stand-up was quite quick, though, 'cause then I started doing sketch humor, and then I got my own TV show. In the middle, though, I did films and TV, too, so I've been very lucky to be able to mix it all up."

— Tate about her early career, February 2012

In 1996 Tate began performing stand-up comedy. Soon after, she co-wrote and starred in Barking (1998), a late-night sketch show broadcast on Channel 4 featuring a host of performers who included David Walliams, Peter Kay and Mackenzie Crook. In 2000, she became involved with Lee Mack's Perrier Comedy Award-nominated New Bits show at the Edinburgh Film Festival and appeared in television sketch shows such as The Harry Hill Show and That Peter Kay Thing. The next year, she returned to the festival with her own sell-out one-woman show, which was followed by roles in comedy series Big Train, Attention Scum, Charlie Brooker's TVGoHome and several BBC Radio productions.

After being spotted at Edinburgh by the casting director Tracey Gillham, she was given her first major television role as Angela in the comedy Wild West (2002–2004) set in the small Cornish town. Tate became pregnant before filming the first series and had to wear a lot of baggy clothes as Angela. The show also starred Dawn French as her lesbian partner and local shop and post office co-owner Mary, who commented, "Catherine Tate is far too talented and she must be destroyed."

=== 2004–2005: Breakthrough with The Catherine Tate Show ===
Tate was approached at a post-show party at the Edinburgh Festival by then-BBC controller of comedy Geoffrey Perkins, who encouraged Tate to develop her character ideas, especially to push the boundaries with her teenage character Lauren Cooper. Undertaking Perkins's advice, after a live show, Tate found the audience walking out of the show repeating the character's catchphrase "Am I bovvered?".

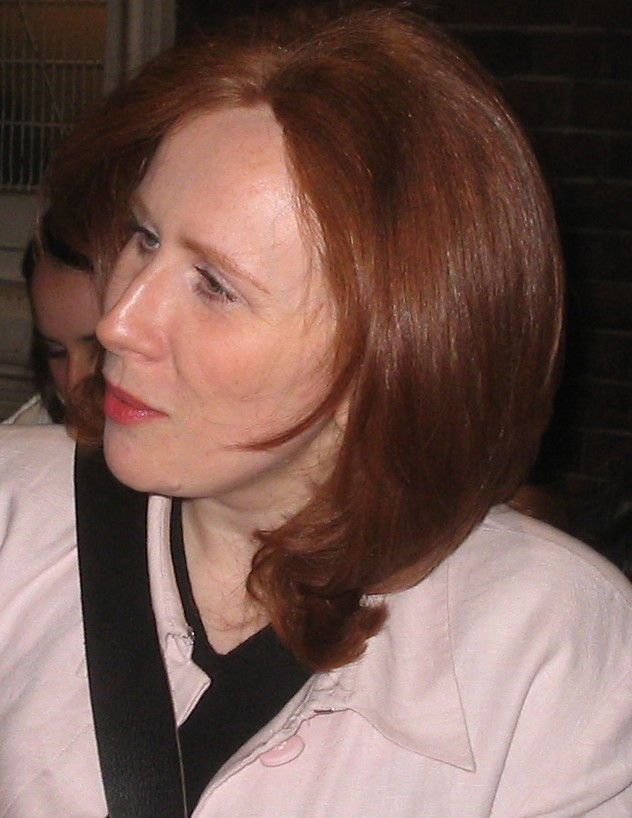
Tate in 2005

Produced by Perkins at Tiger Aspect, Tate was given her own programme on BBC Two in 2004, which she co-wrote and starred in with Derren Litten, entitled The Catherine Tate Show, which ran for three series. Two of the show's well-known characters are teenager Lauren Cooper and Joanie "Nan" Taylor, the cockney grandmother. Tate's inspiration for the grandmother character came from visits to old people's homes when she was at drama college. Tate won a British Comedy Award for Best Comedy Newcomer for her work on the first series of The Catherine Tate Show, and with the first series becoming a success, in March 2005, Tate made a guest appearance during the BBC's Red Nose Day as the character of Lauren, alongside boy band McFly, which gained her further exposure.

In November 2005 Tate appeared in another charity sketch as part of the BBC's annual Children in Need telethon. The segment was a crossover between EastEnders and The Catherine Tate Show, featuring EastEnders characters Peggy Mitchell, Little Mo Mitchell and Stacey Slater, whilst Tate appeared as Lauren. Also at that time, she was a guest star at the 77th Royal Variety Performance, appearing again in the guise of Lauren Cooper. During the sketch, Tate looked up at the Royal Box and asked the Queen, "Is one bovvered? Is one's face bovvered?", while her co-star Niky Wardley (in character as Liese) remarked: "That old man sitting next to her has fallen asleep." Prince Philip then reportedly complained to the show's executive producer, saying he had been insulted. Tate later won a British Comedy Award for Best British Comedy Actress for her work in the second series of The Catherine Tate Show.

In January 2005, Tate appeared as Mitzi Kosinki in the ITV adaptation of Agatha Christie's novel A Murder Is Announced, starring Geraldine McEwan as Miss Marple. Towards the end of the year, Tate played the part of Kate in the unaired pilot episode of Lee Mack's sitcom Not Going Out and Mrs Chadband in an episode of the BBC television adaptation of Bleak House.

Tate returned to the stage for the first time since working with the Royal Shakespeare Company, to play a role in the original West End production of Some Girl(s) (2005), alongside Sara Powell, Lesley Manville, Saffron Burrows and Friends star David Schwimmer. In an interview, Tate commented that she could not look Schwimmer in the eye during her time with him, leading to speculation that the pair did not get on. Tate immediately denied the rumours, explaining that she was joking about her attempts to act "cool" around Schwimmer, whom she described as "a very funny, personable man, and easy to get along with".

=== 2006–2010: Doctor Who and films ===
The third series of The Catherine Tate Show aired in 2006, going on to win the National Television Award for most popular comedy as voted for by the public, and Tate's catchphrase "bovvered", used by her character Lauren Cooper, became so influential in popular culture that it was named Word of the Year and was even poised to enter the Oxford English Dictionary. Tate also played the role of Donna Noble in Doctor Who, a temp worker from Chiswick who suddenly appears in the TARDIS at the end of the episode "Doomsday". The following episode, the Christmas special entitled "The Runaway Bride", saw Tate's character in a major role, where she was temporarily the Doctor's companion. On her appearance in the series, Tate commented, "I'm honoured and delighted to be joining David Tennant aboard the TARDIS. I was holding out for a summer season at Wigan rep but as a summer job, this'll do."

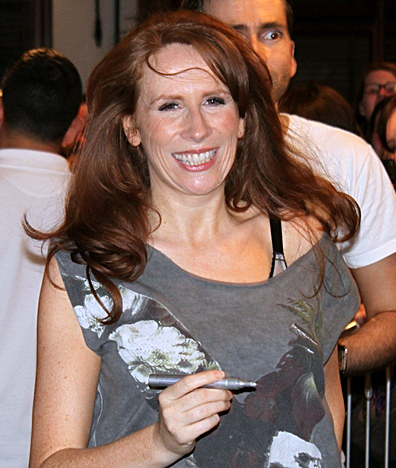
Tate with her Doctor Who co-star David Tennant, behind her, in 2011

Tate had roles in three films in 2006, these included Starter for 10 starring James McAvoy, Sixty Six starring Helena Bonham Carter and Eddie Marsan, and Scenes of a Sexual Nature, a debut feature screenplay from The Catherine Tate Show co-writer Aschlin Ditta. She later appeared in the films Mrs Ratcliffe's Revolution, in which she played the title character opposite Iain Glen, and Love and Other Disasters. In the television adaptation of the best-selling novel of the same name, The Bad Mother's Handbook, she played the dramatic lead role and co-starred with Anne Reid, Holliday Grainger and Robert Pattinson.

On 16 March 2007 Tate appeared for a second time on the Red Nose Day telethon as some of her well-known characters from The Catherine Tate Show. She acted in sketches with David Tennant, her fellow National Youth Theatre alumni Daniel Craig, Lenny Henry and the then Prime Minister Tony Blair, who used the show's famous catchphrase, "Am I bovvered?". Tate also appeared as Nan in an episode of Deal or No Deal, hosted by Noel Edmonds.

She has been nominated for four BAFTA Awards for her work on The Catherine Tate Show, including Best Comedy Performance. Despite speculation that the third series of the show would be the last, Tate and the BBC have not ruled out further episodes. She later filmed a one-off special episode which aired on Christmas Day 2007. The episode was subject to criticism when 42 viewers complained about the amount of swearing, and accused Tate of bigotry over the depiction of a family from Northern Ireland as terrorists, whose Christmas presents included a balaclava and a pair of knuckle dusters, in reference to the Troubles. After the complaints were made, an Ofcom report later concluded that the show was not offensive and did not violate broadcasting regulations. An extract from the Ofcom report read: "Overall this episode was typical of The Catherine Tate Show and would not have gone beyond the expectations of its usual audience. For those not familiar with the show, the information given at the start was adequate."

In summer 2008, Tate starred as Michelle, a promiscuous mathematics teacher, in David Eldridge's Under the Blue Sky at the Duke of York's Theatre, alongside Francesca Annis and Nigel Lindsay. The first preview performance was canceled after she injured her ankle during the final dress rehearsal. Tate, however, returned to the stage the next day and performed preview shows with the aid of a crutch. Earlier that year, she returned to Doctor Who to reprise the role of the Doctor's companion throughout the fourth series, which was shown on BBC One starting on 5 April for a 13-week run. Producer Russell T Davies said, "We are delighted that one of Britain's greatest talents has agreed to join us for the fourth series." Tate added, "I am delighted to be returning to Doctor Who. I had a blast last Christmas and look forward to travelling again through time and space with that nice man from Gallifrey."

"For one brief moment I was the most important woman in the whole of the universe. Oh gosh, I can't thank Russell [T Davies] enough for just making that possible. For many people, I'm sure, what a gamble to take on someone like me who is known, by the vast majority of people, for wearing wigs and comedy teeth."

— Tate on her Doctor Who role, July 2008

At the 2008 TV Quick Awards and SFX Awards, Tate was voted best actress for her dramatic Doctor Who performance. She also earned a nomination at the 14th National Television Awards. A year and a half after the heartbreaking finale of the fourth series, she returned as Donna in the first part of the show's festive special "The End of Time", which was broadcast on Christmas Day 2009 and became the final story for both David Tennant as the Tenth Doctor and Russell T Davies as showrunner. Later that day, Nan's Christmas Carol premiered, a one-off special spin-off to The Catherine Tate Show focused on Nan, who gets visited by three ghosts (played by David Tennant, Ben Miller and Roger Lloyd-Pack) in her council flat. The next day, Tate and Tennant guest hosted Jonathan Ross's BBC Radio 2 show, having already done so on 11 April and later appearing on the show once again on 30 January 2010.

In March 2010, Tate took part in Channel 4's Comedy Gala, a benefit show held in aid of Great Ormond Street Children's Hospital, filmed live at the O2 Arena in London. She went on to make her directorial debut in Sky One's series of short comedy films called Little Crackers. The autobiographical short film My First Nativity (2010), also written by and starring Tate as her mother Josephine, showed the young Catherine performing an impression of Gary Glitter in her school nativity play. It received a nomination for the Best Comedy Programme at the 2011 British Academy Television Awards.

On Christmas Day 2010 Tate appeared as Queen Isabelle of Lilliput in the film adaptation of Gulliver's Travels starring Jack Black in the title role. She then starred opposite Selena Gomez in another American comedy film, Monte Carlo (2011).

=== 2011–present: Further television and stage work ===
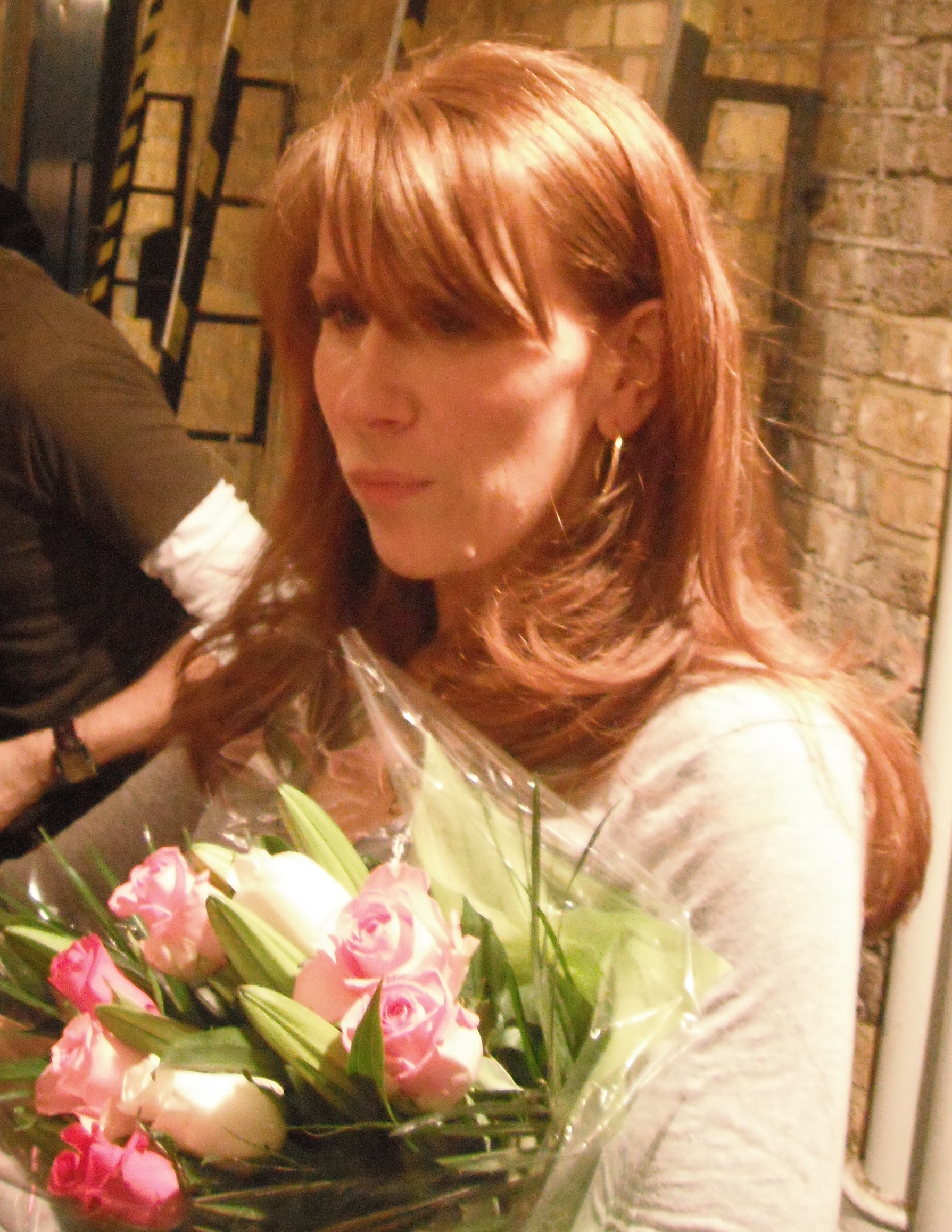
Tate at the stage door of the 2011 Wyndham's Theatre production of Much Ado About Nothing

In March 2011, the video for Take That's new single "Happy Now" was debuted on Comic Relief. The video showed Tate alongside comedians Alan Carr, James Corden, John Bishop and David Walliams, all auditioning to become Take That's ultimate tribute band, Fake That. In December, she presented Channel 4's two-hour documentary Catherine Tate: Laughing at the Noughties, in which she met Carr, Walliams, Noel Fielding, Rob Brydon and her Doctor Who co-star David Tennant to discuss the comedy highlights of the 2000s. It was soon after she served as a guest host on the comedy shows The Sunday Night Project (2009) and Never Mind the Buzzcocks (2010).

From May to September 2011, Tate appeared alongside Tennant in the Shakespeare comedy Much Ado About Nothing at the Wyndham's Theatre. The production was recorded by Digital Theatre and is available to watch on their website. For her performance as Beatrice, Tate won the BroadwayWorld UK Award for Best Leading Actress in a Play, while her reunion with Tennant won the WhatsOnStage Award for the Theatre Event of the Year. At the same ceremony, she received an award in the Best Supporting Actress category for the Royal National Theatre production of Alan Ayckbourn's Season's Greetings (2010–2011), in which she played Belinda.

Tate guest starred in the two-part seventh season finale of the American mockumentary sitcom The Office, which aired on 19 May 2011. She portrayed Nellie Bertram, who was interviewed for the Regional Manager position of the Dunder Mifflin Scranton branch, the position that Michael Scott (played by Steve Carell) held for the majority of the series. She was reportedly the top choice to replace Carell, but was unable to join the filming, due to her commitment to Much Ado About Nothing. However, in January 2012 Tate returned to The Office as a series regular for the second half of season eight, reprising her role as Nellie, who was hired as a "misguided special projects manager". She continued in the role for the ninth and final season.

In May 2013, she starred alongside Lee Mack in the unaired BBC One pilot for Everybody Loves Raymond remake, titled The Smiths. Two promotional photos were released in August but the project was eventually scrapped, with Mack concentrating more on his sitcom Not Going Out. Coincidentally, Tate played Kate in the original 2005 pilot of the show, which was also never broadcast. Around the same time in 2013, she joined David Walliams and Philip Glenister in the BBC One sitcom Big School (2013–2014), playing the main role of French teacher Sarah Postern in both series of the show. Tate later appeared as a nun alongside Walliams as Lou Todd in a Red Nose Day 2015 sketch, featuring Stephen Hawking in the Andy Pipkin role.

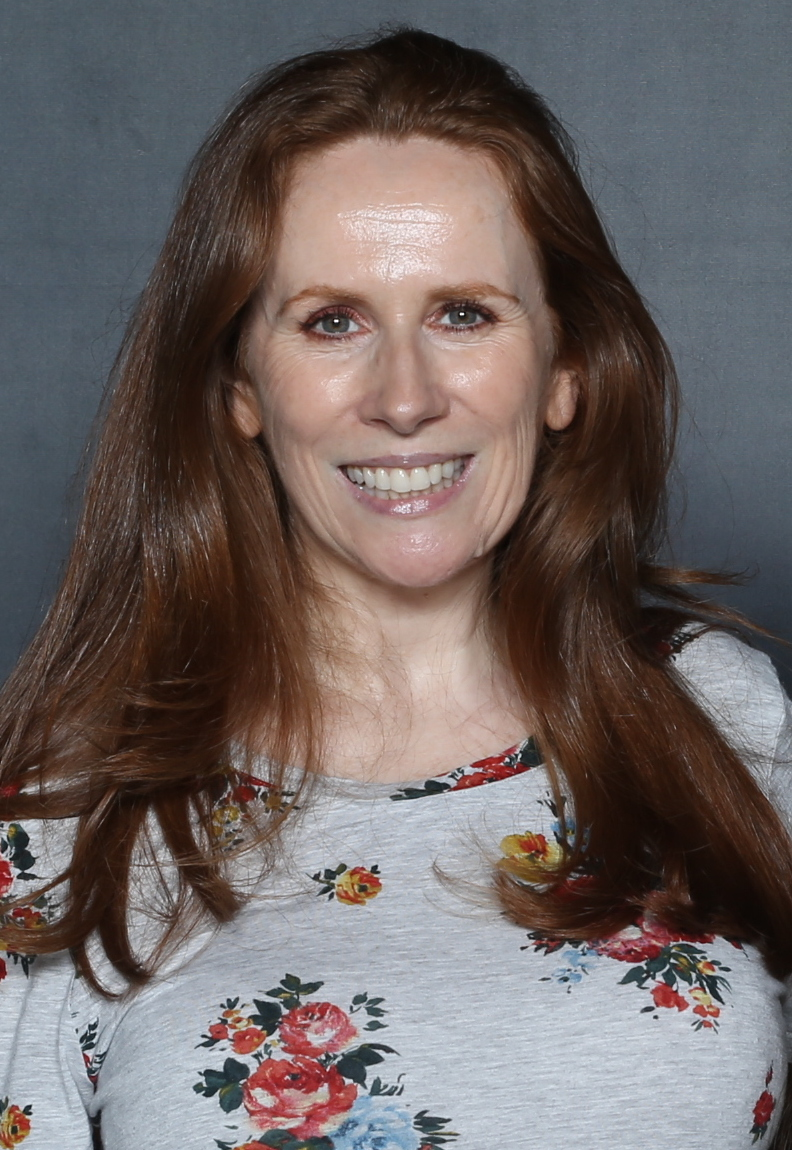
Tate at Raleigh Supercon in 2018

In 2013, she accepted the role in the low-budget superhero comedy film SuperBob (2015) written by and starring Brett Goldstein as the title character, which led to a number of collaborations with Goldstein. Three episodes of her sitcom Catherine Tate's Nan, co-written with Goldstein, aired in January 2014 and December 2015 on BBC One. The role of Joanie Taylor earned her a nomination at the 2015 British Academy Television Awards for Best Female Comedy Performance. Tate calls Nan "the one [character] that's got the legs to carry on" and her favourite to play: "It's the one character I can look at on screen and not find myself in. It's a very good transformation. In lots of the others it's clear that it's me. I just enjoy playing that character mainly because you get the privilege of age where you can swear and people laugh. Old people swearing is funny." She reprised the role several times between 2009 and 2018 on Graham Norton, Michael McIntyre, Paul O'Grady and Alan Carr's television shows and performed Bonnie Tyler's song "Holding Out for a Hero" in character for Let's Sing and Dance for Comic Relief (2017).

Tate portrayed both Eva Braun and Édith Piaf in the pilot episode of the Sky Arts sketch show Psychobitches (2012). In autumn 2014, she was cast as another real-life person in her first musical production, the Menier Chocolate Factory revival of Stephen Sondheim's Assassins (2014–2015). Her character was Sara Jane Moore, a woman who attempted to assassinate U.S. President Gerald Ford. She went on to play alongside Mark Gatiss and Judi Dench in The Vote, a James Graham play set in a fictitious London polling station, which was broadcast live on More4 on election night 2015. In spring 2016, Tate appeared as fashion designer Myrna in another musical comedy, Miss Atomic Bomb, at the St. James Theatre. Benjamin McDonald, writing in Gay Times, praised Tate's performance, saying she "proves she has the strong vocal ability to match her impeccable comic timing". The show itself received much poorer reviews, including a one-star review from The Stage.

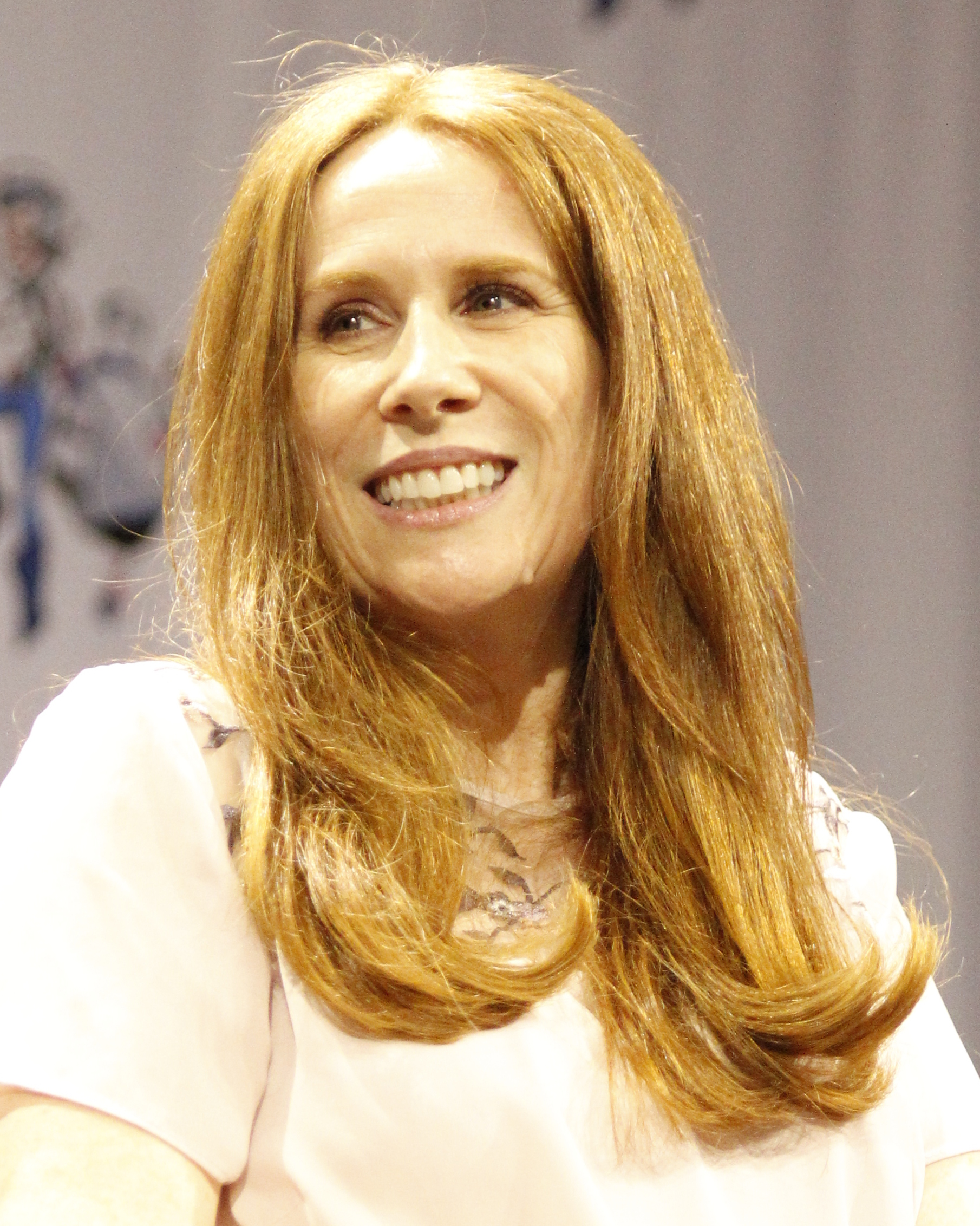
Tate at GalaxyCon Raleigh in 2019

On New Year's Day 2016, Tate played the role of hand model Sapphire Diamond in the television adaptation of David Walliams's children's book Billionaire Boy. She appeared in Bruce's Hall of Fame with Alexander Armstrong the following day with a musical tribute to her childhood hero Victoria Wood, calling her the first woman she had seen being funny on television. She then chose Wood as her inspirational female figure when promoting Leading Lady Parts (2018), a short film inspired by the Time's Up movement and starring Tate as a casting director auditioning several A-list actresses for a leading lady role.

In October 2016, Tate began touring British theatres with The Catherine Tate Show Live, guest starring Brett Goldstein (who also co-wrote the show with Tate) and her long-time collaborators Mathew Horne and Niky Wardley. Most of the main characters from the original television show, such as Nan, Lauren, nurse Bernie, Geordie Georgie and Derek Faye, all featured in the show. Some pre-recorded sketches, including cameos by Nick Grimshaw and Billy Connolly, were shown during each of the many changes of Tate's costumes and wigs. In late 2018, she brought the show to Australia and New Zealand with the help of two new cast members, David O'Reilly and Alex Carter, before finishing her tour at London's Wyndham's Theatre in January 2019. Around the same time, she hosted the 2018 Laurence Olivier Awards. An edited version of the ceremony was broadcast on ITV. It was also covered live on Magic Radio, where listeners heard Tate hilariously going back on fluffed lines multiple times, occasionally swearing. She later apologised after it was pointed out the event was going out live.

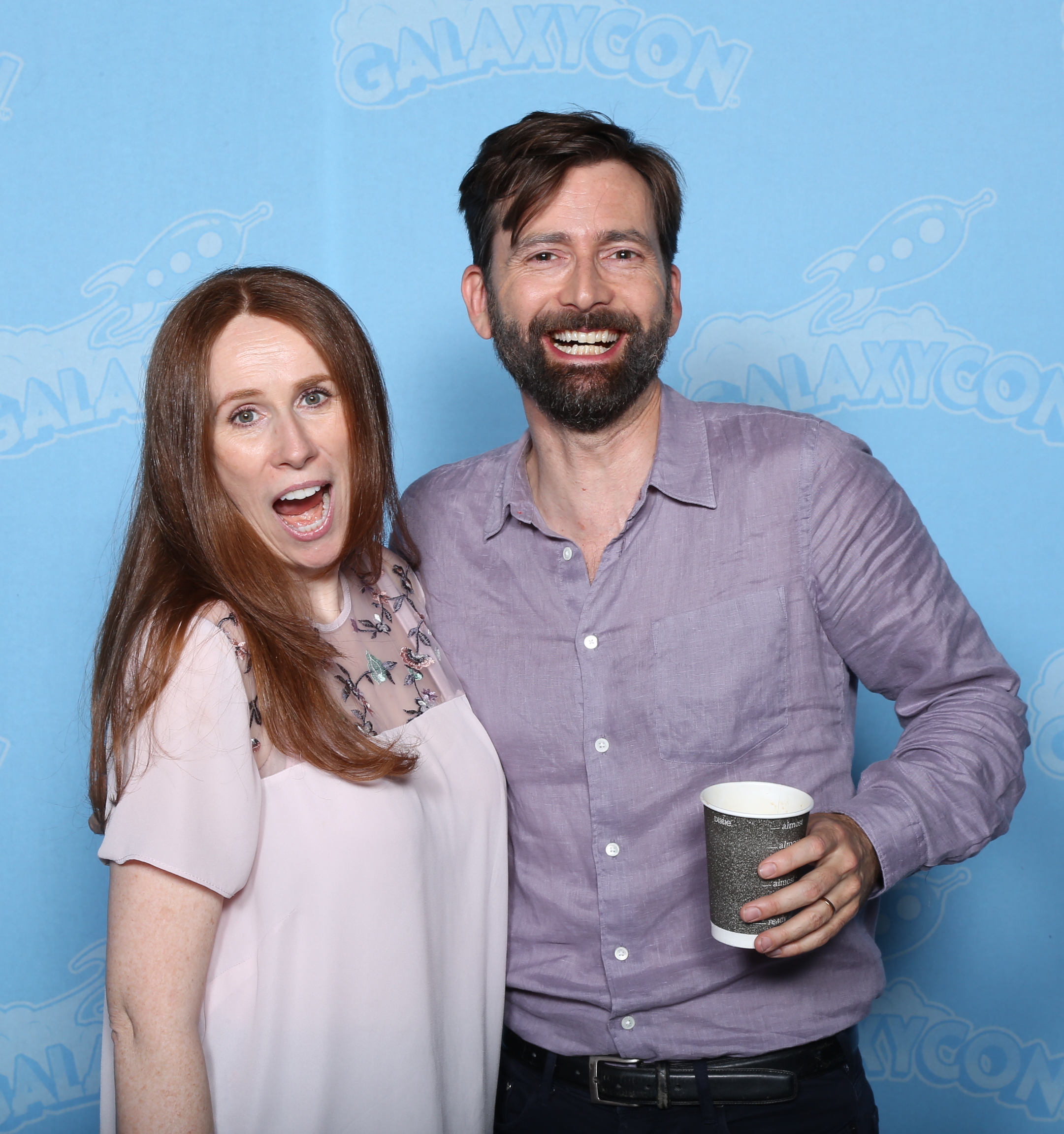
Tate with David Tennant at GalaxyCon Raleigh in 2019

In 2016 and 2019, Tate and David Tennant reprised their Doctor Who roles in two volumes of the full-cast audio series The Tenth Doctor Adventures from Big Finish Productions. Talking about his frequent colleague during the recording session, Tennant said: "I love working with Catherine because of the life that she brings to something and the way that she can turn the most mundane line into something glorious and sparkling. I love Catherine for what she is most famous for, and that's being funny and brilliant and witty and quick, but I love the fact that she's a great and proper actress." In October 2017, Tate was revealed to be part of the cast of Disney XD's DuckTales reboot, providing the voice of the villainous sorceress Magica De Spell following the death of the character's long-time voice actor, June Foray, in July of the same year. Tennant provided the voice of the show's protagonist, Scrooge McDuck.

In April 2020, Tate revived her popular character Lauren Cooper for The Big Night In, a telethon held during the COVID-19 pandemic, in a skit that had her being schooled remotely by a teacher played again by Tennant. Another popular character from The Catherine Tate Show, Nan, made a return the next year in a Comic Relief sketch starring Daniel Craig as James Bond, followed by the feature film The Nan Movie (2022).

In April 2022, she starred as six different characters in Hard Cell, a Netflix original mockumentary sitcom set in a women's prison. She co-wrote the series with Niky Wardley and Alex Carter and co-directed all six episodes with James Kayler. In May, it was announced Tate would reprise her role as Donna Noble, alongside David Tennant as the Fourteenth Doctor, for the 60th anniversary specials of Doctor Who. In August, the BBC commissioned Queen of Oz, a sitcom written by and starring Tate as a disgraced member of a fictional British royal family sent to rule Australia, which aired in June 2023.

In May 2023, Tate was the UK's jury spokesperson in the final of the Eurovision Song Contest 2023, in which she announced the UK's jury points directly from the Liverpool Arena, where the event was held.

In December 2025 Tate appeared in pantomime in the London Palladium.

In February 2026, Tate was announced to be joining the West End production of the play Oh, Mary!, written by Cole Escola, in the lead role of Mary Todd Lincoln for a limited run from April to July.

== Personal life ==
Tate was formerly in a relationship with stage manager Twig Clark, with whom she has a daughter, who was born in January 2003.

Tate suffered from postpartum depression, from which she only recovered after the filming of the second series of The Catherine Tate Show. She also suffers from occasional panic attacks. Regarding her personal outlook, Tate has said, "I'm an incredibly negative person, so any form of success is only ever going to be a relief to me and set my default position back to neutral."

Tate has been married to American screenwriter Jeff Gutheim since at least 2018.

Tate is also fluent in French and Spanish.

== Charity work ==
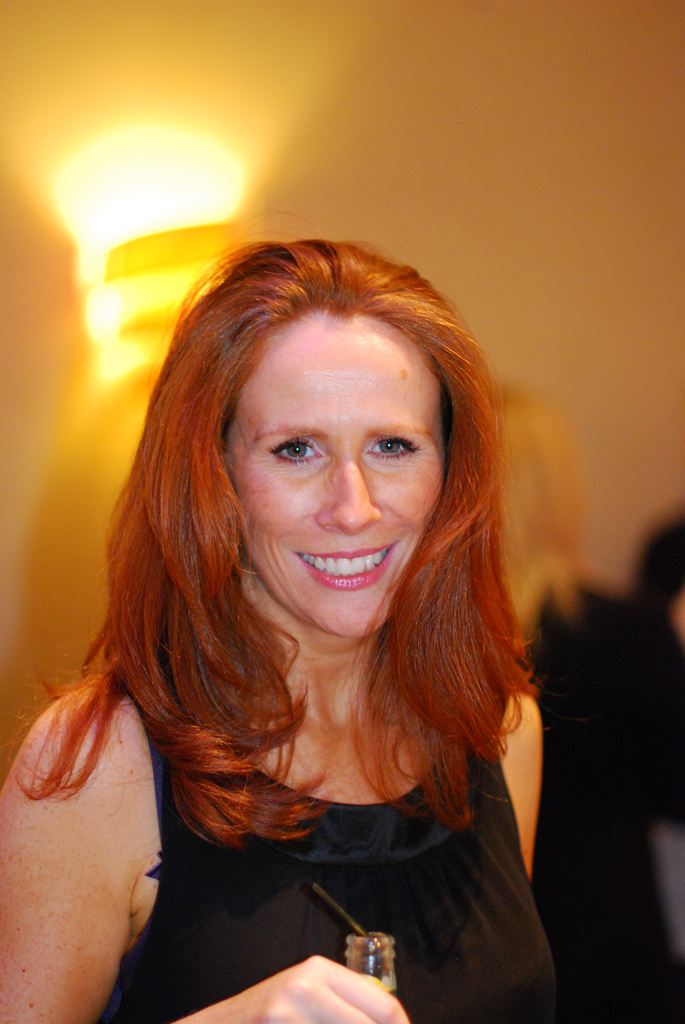
Tate at the Joe Glover Trust charity event in 2010

Tate is a patron of the Laura Crane Youth Cancer Trust, supporting the charity since 2006. Since then, she has hosted a fundraising auction, filmed a five-minute film featuring herself and David Tennant on the set of Doctor Who for the charity's annual ball and taken part in its 2011 calendar with the Huddersfield Giants. She is also the current patron of the Addie Brady Foundation, raising funds for research into high-grade paediatric brain tumours and supporting families with Li–Fraumeni Syndrome, and was a patron of the children's cancer charity the Joe Glover Trust for a number of years since its launching in 2007.

Since 2005, Tate has been a frequent supporter of two BBC telethon charities, Children in Need and Comic Relief. For the latter, she so far has starred in eleven sketches and a music video. She also appeared as Lauren Cooper from The Catherine Tate Show live on stage during the Red Nose Day 2005 and 2017 events, and as Nan in 2009.

In August 2017, after being asked at the Wizard World Chicago convention about what her career would look like if she hadn't become an actress and comedian, Tate said: "I'd definitely work with animals. In fact, sometimes I do feel, 'Oh, am I sort of wasting my time doing [acting] when I should be doing sort of like stuff with animals in need?' because I'm a big animal welfare kind of person, animal rights person." She has supported the animal rescue centre Battersea Dogs & Cats Home on multiple occasions and adopted cats from there. In 2018, she presented the BBC One hour-long documentary Saving the British Bulldog about the health issues affecting one of the most popular dog breeds in the UK. In 2020, she featured in a video aimed to raise funds for the Zoological Society of London after it was badly impacted by the coronavirus pandemic.

== Filmography ==
=== Film ===
Year	Title	Role	Notes	Ref.
2006	Love and Other Disasters	Tallulah Riggs-Wentworth		
2006	Scenes of a Sexual Nature	Sara Williams		
2006	Sixty Six	Aunt Lila		
2006	Starter for 10	Julie Jackson		
2007	Mrs Ratcliffe's Revolution	Dorothy Ratcliffe		
2010	Gulliver's Travels	Queen of Lilliput		
2011	Monte Carlo	Alicia Winthrop-Scott		
2013	Khumba	Nora the Sheep (voice)		
2014	Nativity 3: Dude, Where's My Donkey?!	Sophie Ford		
2014	Asterix: The Mansions of the Gods	Dulcia (voice)	UK dub	
2015	Not Sophie's Choice	Mummy	Short film	
2015	Unity	Narrator (voice)	Documentary	
2015	SuperBob	Theresa Ford		
2017	Perfect Roast Potatoes	Tamara	Short film	
2017	Monster Family	Baba Yaga (voice)		
2021	Monster Family 2	Baba Yaga (voice)		
2022	The Nan Movie	Joanie Taylor	Also writer and executive producer	
2023	Rally Road Racers	Juni Håkansdotter (voice)		

=== Television ===
==== Acting credits ====
Key
†	Denotes productions that have not yet been released

Year	Title	Role	Notes	Ref.
1991	Surgical Spirit	Girlfriend	Episode: "The Holiday Job"	
1993, 1994, 1997	The Bill	Various characters	3 episodes	
1994	Men Behaving Badly	Potential Buyer	Episode: "Casualties"	
1994	Milner	Jesson's P.A.	TV film	
1994, 1998	London's Burning	Molly / Ginnie Readman	2 episodes	
1998	Barking	Various characters	6 episodes; also writer	
2000	That Peter Kay Thing	Valerie Sharples	Episode: "Leonard"	
2000	Harry Hill	Various characters	4 episodes	
2001	Attention Scum	Various characters	2 episodes; also writer of additional material	
2001	TV Go Home	Various characters	6 episodes	
2002	Big Train	Various characters	6 episodes; also writer of additional material	
2002–2004	Wild West	Angela Phillips	Main role, 12 episodes	
2004–2007	The Catherine Tate Show	Various characters	Lead role, 20 episodes; also writer	
2005	Agatha Christie's Marple	Mitzi Kosinki	Episode: "A Murder Is Announced"	
2005	Twisted Tales	Wendy Midwich	Episode: "The Patter of Tiny Feet"	
2005	Not Going Out	Kate	Unaired pilot	
2005	Bleak House	Mrs. Chadband	Episode 4	
2006, 2008–2010, 2023	Doctor Who	Donna Noble	19 episodes: Cameo (series 2) (Note: Tate makes her first appearance, credited as "The Bride", in the closing scenes of 2006 series finale "Doomsday".); Guest role (2006 special, 2009–2010 special); Main role (series 4, 60th anniversary)	
2007	The Bad Mother's Handbook	Karen Cooper	TV film	
2009	Nan's Christmas Carol	Joanie Taylor	TV special	
2010	Little Crackers	Josephine Ford	Episode: "My First Nativity"; also director and writer	
2010	The One Ronnie	Barmaid	TV special	
2011	The Itch of the Golden Nit	Stella (voice)	Short film	
2011	This is Jinsy	Roopina Crale	Episode: "Beardboy"	
2011–2013	The Office	Nellie Bertram	34 episodes: Guest role (season 7) (Note: Tate first appears in the two-part finale of the 7th season, titled "Search Committee".); Main role (seasons 8–9) (Note: From the 15th episode of the 8th season, titled "Tallahassee".)	
2012	Playhouse Presents	Eva Braun / Édith Piaf	Episode: "Psychobitches"	
2013	The Smiths	Jenny Smith	Unaired pilot for Everybody Loves Raymond remake	
2013–2014	Big School	Sarah Postern	Main role, 12 episodes	
2014–2015	Catherine Tate's Nan	Joanie Taylor	Lead role, 3 episodes; also writer and executive producer	
2015	Michael McIntyre's Easter Night at the Coliseum	Joanie Taylor	TV special	
2015	Crackanory	Storyteller	Episode: "The Catchment Area"	
2016	Billionaire Boy	Sapphire Diamond	TV film	
2016	Do Not Disturb	Anna Wilson	TV film	
2016	Drunk History	Mary Wilson / Elsie Wright	2 episodes	
2016	Michael McIntyre's Big Show	Joanie Taylor	Episode: "Michael McIntyre's Big Christmas Show"	
2017	The Adventures of Puss in Boots	Hecate (voice)	2 episodes	
2017–2021	DuckTales	Magica De Spell (voice)	9 episodes	
2018	Leading Lady Parts	Boss	Short film	
2020	The Big Night In	Lauren Cooper	TV special	
2021–2022	The Brilliant World of Tom Gates	Rita Gates (voice)	42 episodes	
2022	Hard Cell	Various characters	Lead role, 6 episodes; also director, writer and executive producer	
2023	Queen of Oz	Princess Georgiana	Lead role, 6 episodes; also writer and executive producer	
2025–present	Going Dutch	Katja Vanderhoff	Series regular	

==== Presenting and game show credits ====
Year	Title	Role	Notes	Ref.
2009	Doctor Who at the Proms	Guest presenter	Сut-down version of the Royal Albert Hall concert	
2009	The Sunday Night Project	Presenter / Guest	2 episodes	
2009	Genius	Judge	1 episode	
2009	Never Mind the Buzzcocks	Guest / Presenter	2 episodes	
2010	Never Mind the Buzzcocks	Guest / Presenter	2 episodes	
2010	Sidekick Stories	Narrator (voice)	Documentary	
2010	The Unbelievable Truth	Guest (voice)	Radio game show; 2 episodes	
2011	Catherine Tate: Laughing at the Noughties	Presenter	Documentary	
2016	Shakespeare Live! From the RSC	Presenter	Live broadcast theatrical event	
2016	Duck Quacks Don't Echo	Guest	1 episode	
2016–2017, 2019	8 Out of 10 Cats Does Countdown	Contestant	3 episodes	
2018	Saving the British Bulldog	Presenter	Documentary	
2018	Laurence Olivier Awards	Presenter	Сut-down version of the 2018 awards ceremony	
2023	Eurovision Song Contest	UK Spokesperson	Song Contest	

=== Radio and audio dramas ===
Year	Title	Role	Production	Notes	Ref.
1999	Quando, Quando, Quando	Various characters	BBC Radio 4	6 episodes	
2000	Hey Hey We're the Monks	DSS Officer	BBC Radio 2		
2001	Six Geese A-laying	Various characters	BBC Radio 4		
2003	A Boy in a Well	Mrs. Pickery	BBC Radio 4		
2003–2009	Giles Wemmbley-Hogg Goes Off	Arabella	BBC Radio 4	4 episodes	
2007	Down the Line	Various characters	BBC Radio 4	Episode: "War and Chocolate"	
2008	Doctor Who: The Forever Trap	Narrator	BBC Audio		
2009	Doctor Who: The Nemonite Invasion	Narrator	BBC Audio		
2010	Bette and Joan and Baby Jane	Bette Davis	BBC Radio 4		
2013	Doctor Who: Destiny of the Doctor	Narrator	Big Finish Productions		
2015	The Bed-Sitting Room	Penelope	BBC Radio 4		
2016	The Archers	Lisa	BBC Radio 4	Episode: "Jury Special"	
2016, 2019	Doctor Who: The Tenth Doctor Adventures	Donna Noble	Big Finish Productions	Main role, 6 episodes	
2017	Treasure Island	Mrs. Hawkins	Audible		
2019	Our Martyred Lady	Inquisitor Greyfax	Black Library	Main role, 4 episodes	
2019–2021	Date Night	Terri	BBC Radio 4	8 episodes	
2020	Donna Noble: Kidnapped!	Donna Noble	Big Finish Productions	Lead role, 4 episodes	

=== Video games ===
Year	Title	Role	Notes	Ref.
2019	Anthem	Max (voice)		
2020	Dash and Blink	Narrator (voice)	Interactive BBC Bitesize game for learning French, Spanish and Mandarin	

=== Music videos ===
Year	Title	Artist	Director	Ref.
2011	"Happy Now"	Take That	Tom Harper and Richard Curtis	

== Theatre ==
Year	Title	Role	Venue / Company	Ref.
1988–1990	Blood Wedding	Unknown	National Youth Theatre	
1994	All My Sons	Lydia Lubey	Oxford Stage Company	
1995	The Way of the World	Peg	Royal National Theatre	
1996	The Prince's Play	Barmaid	Royal National Theatre	
1999	The Cobbler's Prophecy	Zelota	Shakespeare's Globe	
2000	Lee Mack's New Bits	Various characters	Edinburgh Festival	
2000–2001	A Servant to Two Masters	Smeraldina	Royal Shakespeare Company	
2005	Some Girl(s)	Sam	Gielgud Theatre	
2005	Royal Variety Performance	Lauren Cooper	Wales Millennium Centre	
2006	The Exonerated	Sunny Jacobs	Riverside Studios	
2006	Toccata and Fugue (Note: Toccata and Fugue was originally produced as part of The 24 Hour Plays on Broadway on October 23, 2006. It was written by Tina Howe and directed by Josie Rourke.)	Charlotte	American Airlines Theatre	
2008	Under the Blue Sky	Michelle	Duke of York's Theatre	
2010–2011	Season's Greetings	Belinda Bunker	Royal National Theatre	
2011	Much Ado About Nothing	Beatrice	Wyndham's Theatre	
2011	Sixty-Six Books	God	Bush Theatre	
2013	The Garden of Ms Harriet Figg (Note: The Garden of Ms Harriet Figg was produced as part of the Old Vic Theatre's 24 Hour Plays Celebrity Gala. It was written by Matt Hartley and directed by Lisa Spirling.)	Harriet Figg	Old Vic Theatre	
2014–2015	Assassins	Sara Jane Moore	Menier Chocolate Factory	
2015	The Vote	Kirsty Henderson	Donmar Warehouse	
2016	Miss Atomic Bomb	Myrna Ranapapadophilou	St. James Theatre	
2016, 2018–2019	The Catherine Tate Show Live	Various characters	Various venues across the UK, Australia and New Zealand	
2023–2024	The Enfield Haunting	Peggy Hodgson	Ambassadors Theatre	
2025–2026	Sleeping Beauty	Carabosse the Wicked Fairy	London Palladium	
2026	Oh, Mary!	Mary Todd Lincoln	Trafalgar Theatre	

== Discography ==
Year	Title	Album	Ref.
2011	"Sigh No More (Bonus Track)" (with David Tennant)	Much Ado About Nothing	
2011	"We Go Together (Bonus Track)" (with David Tennant)	Much Ado About Nothing	
2013	"In These Shoes? (Live at Shepherd's Bush Empire 2010)"	A Concert for Kirsty MacColl (Live)	
2014	"It's Love (The Wedding Song)" (with Martin Clunes and other cast members of Nativity 3: Dude, Where's My Donkey?!)	Nativity 3: Dude, Where's My Donkey?! (Original Motion Picture Soundtrack)	
2014	"Empire State Medley" (with Martin Clunes and other cast members of Nativity 3: Dude, Where's My Donkey?!)	Nativity 3: Dude, Where's My Donkey?! (Original Motion Picture Soundtrack)	

== Awards and nominations ==
Year	Award	Category	Work	Result	Ref.
2000	Edinburgh Comedy Awards	Best Comedy Show (shared with Lee Mack and Dan Antopolski)	Lee Mack's New Bits	Nominated	
2004	Rockie Awards	Best Comedy	The Catherine Tate Show	Won	
2004	British Comedy Awards	Best Comedy Newcomer	The Catherine Tate Show	Won	
2004	British Comedy Awards	Best TV Comedy Actress	The Catherine Tate Show	Nominated	
2005	British Comedy Awards	Best TV Comedy Actress	The Catherine Tate Show	Nominated	
2005	British Comedy Awards	Best TV Comedy	The Catherine Tate Show	Nominated	
2005	British Comedy Awards	People's Choice Award (Note: The award was "mistakenly given" to Ant & Dec's Saturday Night Takeaway even though The Catherine Tate Show received the most votes and should have been declared the winner. They returned Tate her comedy prize in 2008.)	The Catherine Tate Show	Won	
2005	International Emmy Awards	Best Performance by an Actress	The Catherine Tate Show	Nominated	
2005	British Academy Television Craft Awards	Best New Writer (shared with Derren Litten)	The Catherine Tate Show	Nominated	
2005	British Academy Television Awards	Best Comedy Programme (shared with Geoffrey Perkins and Gordon Anderson)	The Catherine Tate Show	Nominated	
2005	Women in Film and Television Awards	Creative Originality Award	The Catherine Tate Show	Won	
2005	Variety Club Showbiz Awards	Comedy Award	The Catherine Tate Show	Won	
2005	Rose d'Or	Best Comedy	The Catherine Tate Show	Nominated	
2005	RTS Programme Awards	Network Newcomer – On Screen	The Catherine Tate Show	Won	
2006	RTS Programme Awards	Comedy Performance	The Catherine Tate Show	Won	
2006	RTS Programme Awards	Entertainment	The Catherine Tate Show	Won	
2006	Broadcast Awards	Best Comedy Programme	The Catherine Tate Show	Won	
2006	British Comedy Awards	Best TV Comedy Actress (Note: For the 2005 Christmas special.)	The Catherine Tate Show	Won	
2006	British Academy Television Awards	Best Comedy Performance	The Catherine Tate Show	Nominated	
2006	British Academy Television Awards	Best Comedy Programme	The Catherine Tate Show	Nominated	
2006	Rose d'Or	Best Female Comedy Performance	The Catherine Tate Show	Nominated	
2006	Rose d'Or	Best Comedy	The Catherine Tate Show	Nominated	
2006	National Television Awards	Most Popular Comedy Programme	The Catherine Tate Show	Nominated	
2007	National Television Awards	Most Popular Comedy Programme	The Catherine Tate Show	Won	
2007	RTS Programme Awards	Comedy Performance	The Catherine Tate Show	Nominated	
2007	British Comedy Awards	Best TV Comedy Actress	The Catherine Tate Show	Nominated	
2007	British Academy Television Awards	Best Comedy Programme (shared with Perkins, Anderson and Aschlin Ditta)	The Catherine Tate Show	Nominated	
2007	Glamour Awards	Funny Woman	The Catherine Tate Show	Won	
2007	Nickelodeon Kids' Choice Awards UK	Funniest Person	The Catherine Tate Show	Nominated	
2008	Nickelodeon Kids' Choice Awards UK	Favourite Funny Person	The Catherine Tate Show	Nominated	
2008	Nickelodeon Kids' Choice Awards UK	Favourite Female TV Star	Doctor Who	Nominated	
2008	National Television Awards	Outstanding Drama Performance	Doctor Who	Nominated	
2008	TV Quick Awards	Best Actress	Doctor Who	Won	
2008	SFX Awards	Best TV Actress	Doctor Who	Won	
2009	Constellation Awards	Best Female Performance in a Science Fiction Television Episode (Note: For the 2008 episode "Turn Left".)	Doctor Who	Won	
2009	Airlock Alpha Portal Awards	Best Actress – Television	Doctor Who	Won	
2011	British Academy Television Awards	Best Comedy Programme (shared with Sophie Clarke-Jervoise and Izzy Mant) (Note: For the 2010 episode "Catherine Tate's Little Cracker: My First Nativity".)	Little Crackers	Nominated	
2011	Channel of the Year Awards	Producer or Director Debut (Note: For the 2010 episode "Catherine Tate's Little Cracker: My First Nativity".)	Little Crackers	Nominated	
2011	BroadwayWorld UK Awards	Best Leading Actress in a Play	Much Ado About Nothing	Won	
2012	WhatsOnStage Awards	Theatre Event of the Year (shared with David Tennant) (Note: For reuniting on stage with David Tennant.)	Much Ado About Nothing	Won	
2012	WhatsOnStage Awards	Best Supporting Actress in a Play	Season's Greetings	Won	
2013	Actor Awards	Outstanding Performance by an Ensemble in a Comedy Series (shared with cast)	The Office	Nominated	
2015	British Academy Television Awards	Best Female Performance in a Comedy Programme	Catherine Tate's Nan	Nominated	
2015	FilmQuest Awards	Best Supporting Actress	SuperBob	Nominated	
2022	National Film Awards	Best Screenplay (shared with Brett Goldstein)	The Nan Movie	Nominated	
2023	National Film Awards	Best Supporting Actress in a TV Series	Doctor Who	Nominated	
