= Jeff Gutheim =

American screenwriter (born 1971)

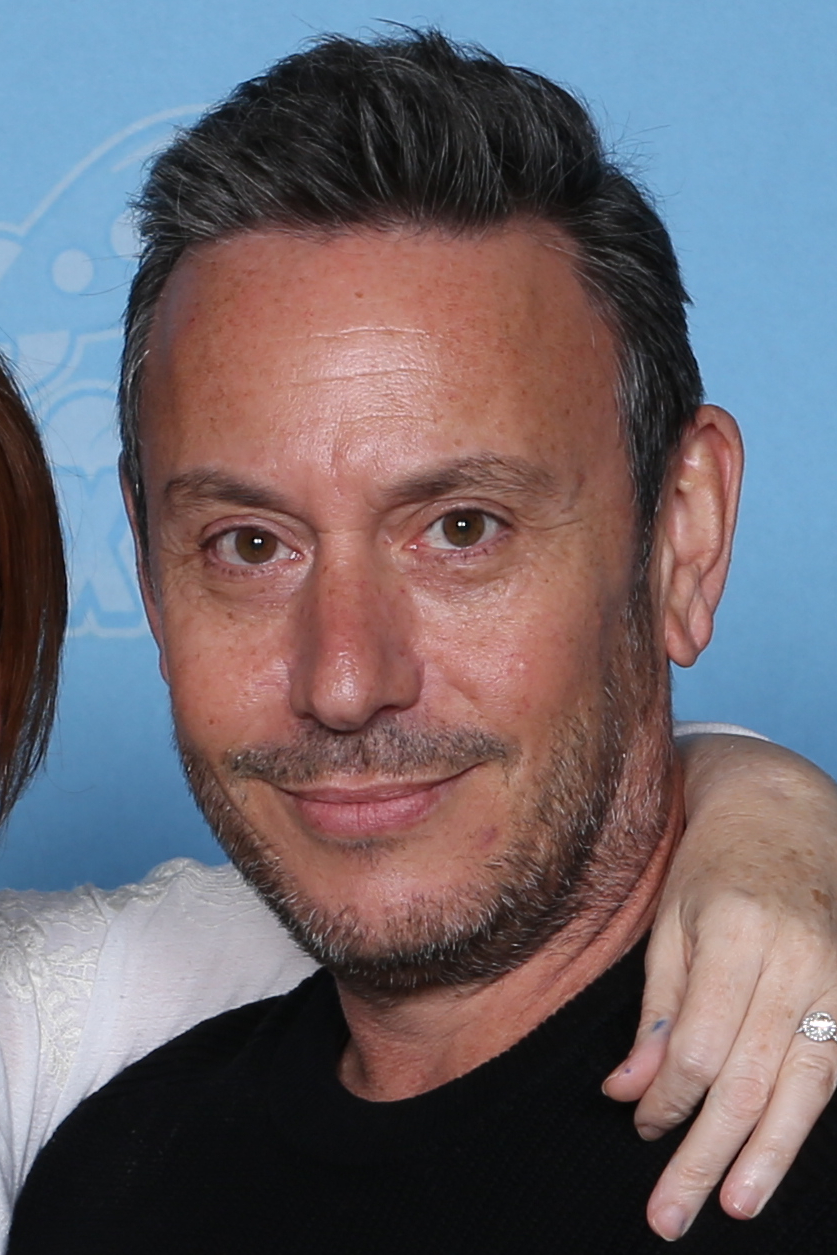
- Gutheim at the 2019 GalaxyCon Minneapolis
- Born: 16 September 1971 (age 55)
- Occupation: Writer
- Years active: 2000–present
- Spouse: Catherine Tate (m. 2019)
- Children: 3

Jeff Gutheim (born September 16, 1971) is an American screenwriter, who specializes in the comedy genre.

Gutheim has penned scripts for Warner Bros., Paramount Pictures, New Line Cinema and WWE Studios, including rewrites of Full of It (2007) and Knucklehead (2010). His latest project is the six-part BBC One series Queen of Oz (2023), starring Catherine Tate as a disgraced member of a fictional British Royal Family sent to rule Australia.

== Career ==
=== As part of a writing duo ===
Gutheim started down the path to becoming a screenwriter quite accidentally. He and his friend since the third grade, Ari Michael Steinbeck, decided to write a screenplay for fun. After finishing their first screenplay, a dark comedy called Don't Call Unless the Maid Dies (originally titled Sand Traps and Eskimo Pies), a friend of theirs submitted it to his literary agent, Gayla Nethercott. She found their fresh voice inspiring and immediately signed them to her agency, Broder Kurland Webb Agency, which has since merged into ICM Partners.

They quickly found out that Hollywood agreed with their agent's opinion and they were hired to write Crash Test Dummy for New Line Cinema. Soon after that, they sold Day Traitor (2000) to Warner Bros. The film was later renamed Cash Money. Jerry Weintraub was attached to the film as a producer. The following year they sold the script for Crackerjack (2001), a comedy about a card shark and a security guy who team up to pull off one of the biggest scams in Las Vegas, to Intermedia Films. All three projects were eventually scrapped.

In 2002, Gutheim and Steinbeck decided to end their writing partnership.

=== Solo work ===
In 2005, Gutheim was again hired by New Line Cinema to write the last draft of Full of It (2007), a teen comedy starring Ryan Pinkston, Kate Mara, Craig Kilborn and Carmen Electra. In September of the following year he was hired by Paramount Pictures to write the screenplay, Stitch 'n Bitch, based on the best-selling series of books written by Debbie Stoller.

In June 2007, Gutheim wrote and went on tour to shoot a series of webisodes centered on the band Fall Out Boy.

In 2009, Gutheim was hired by WWE Studios to write the final draft of Knucklehead (2010), a comedy film starring wrestler Big Show, Mark Feuerstein, Melora Hardin, Dennis Farina and Will Patton.

In August 2022, the BBC announced that Gutheim had co-written the six-part comedy series Queen of Oz (2023), starring his partner Catherine Tate as the scandalous Princess Georgiana, a disgraced member of a fictional British Royal Family sent to rule Australia. It was filmed at the end of 2022 and premiered on BBC One and BBC iPlayer in June 2023.

== Personal life ==
Gutheim has three children from his British-born former wife Tracey.

In early 2019, it was announced that Gutheim had become engaged to English comedian, actress and writer Catherine Tate.

== Filmography ==
| Year | Title | Notes | Ref. |
|---|---|---|---|
| 2007 | Full of It | Rewrite | |
| 2010 | Knucklehead | Rewrite | |
| 2023 | Queen of Oz | 6 episodes; co-written and co-executive produced with Catherine Tate | |
