= The Catherine Tate Show series 2 =

The Catherine Tate Show
- Season 2
- No. of episodes: 6

Release
- Original network: BBC Two
- Original release: July 21 – August 25, 2005

Series chronology
- ← Previous; Series 1 Next → Series 3

The second series of the British television sketch comedy premiered on BBC Two on 21 July 2005. This series included six episodes with the concluding episode broadcast on 25 August 2005. A Christmas Special followed the second series and was screened on BBC Two on 20 December 2005.

Series two introduced several new major characters including Derek Faye, Irene and Vernon, and Janice and Ray; as well as returning characters Joannie 'Nan' Taylor, Lauren Cooper, Bernie, Paul and Sam, Kate and Ellen, Elaine Figgis, and The Aga Saga Woman.

Guest stars for this series include Siobhan Redmond, Jill Halfpenny, Brian Murphy, James Holmes, Una Stubbs, Roger Allam, Robin Weaver, Michael Brandon and Peter Kay. Charlotte Church makes a guest appearance in the Christmas Special.

== Characters ==
- Joannie 'Nan' Taylor: The foul-mouthed grandmother is an old East London woman who constantly swears at and criticises other people. She is always visited by her well-mannered grandson Jamie, where the visits usually start off well enough, with the Nan showing how grateful she is that her grandson has come to see her. However, things usually take a turn for the worse after she starts to make unfavourable comments about her neighbours, family, and home help visitors. Jamie is a university student, but according to Nan, is unemployed. Nan repeatedly asserts that he is gay, although Jamie has said on many occasions that he has a girlfriend. Regular performances by Catherine Tate and Mathew Horne.
- Lauren Cooper: Lauren Cooper is a comprehensive school student with a bad attitude who is most widely known for her phrase "Am I bovvered?". Lauren, her best friend Lisa 'Liese' Jackson and her love interest Ryan Perkins are known as yobs. Regular performances by Catherine Tate, Mathew Horne and Niky Wardley.
- Bernie: The incompetent Irish nurse. Bernie is an unruly, randy woman who bordered on being sacked in the hospital where she worked in every episode. She frequently makes inappropriate remarks to her patients, flirts with most of the male staff, takes a critically ill patient on a wild night out, and mixes up the records of living patients with those of deceased ones. Regular performance by Catherine Tate.
- Paul and Sam: The Essex couple. They are happily married yet slightly simple, and find everyday situations surprisingly hilarious. Paul and Sam often excitedly tell each other stories, which they find highly amusing and interesting. The stories build up and when completed, Paul and Sam would both produce an exaggerated and completely silent laugh. Regular performances by Catherine Tate and Lee Ross.
- Kate and Ellen: This sketch followed two office workers who sat next to each other. While Ellen is usually keen to get on with her work, she is frequently disturbed by Kate (Tate). Kate continually makes conversation about her lifestyle, inviting her co-worker to "Have a guess!" on such delicate situations. While Ellen is reluctant to go along with the guessing games, she is pressured into making a wild guess, which almost always results in Kate's becoming insulted and consequently offensive. Ellen occasionally guesses correctly, causing Kate to become angry and verbally or physically abuse her. Regular performances by Catherine Tate and Ella Kenion.
- Elaine Figgis: Elaine is a woman who appeared in a documentary following her search for love, mostly corresponding with people around the world via the Internet in search of a man. The unseen interviewer and narrator is called Tanya. follows her engagement and eventual marriage to a convicted cannibal and lunatic on Death Row in the US, who abducted, tortured and murdered eight people, proceeding to eat two of them. Regular performance by Catherine Tate and Rebecca Front as the voice of Tanya.
- The Aga Saga Woman: An upper-middle-class woman who goes into a state of shock in various, seemingly innocuous situations. Regular performance by Catherine Tate.
- Derek Faye: Derek, who first appeared in series two, is a man who shows several signs of being gay (combining some mannerisms of famous gay British comedians such as Kenneth Williams and Frankie Howerd), but seems to be in denial about his sexuality and becomes extremely offended and defensive when people assume he is gay. To his dislike, these occurrences are frequent because he behaves in an extremely effeminate way. His most famous catchphrase is "How very dare you!", along with the overuse of the word "dear". This can be seen in another catchphrase; when asked about his sexuality he replies "Who, dear? Me, dear? Gay, dear? No, dear!", or when asked for advice replying "Me, dear? Advice, dear? Yes, dear." When offended, Derek states how he and his mother have been doing something relative to the person Derek is insulted by for 25 years. Regular performer includes Catherine Tate.
- Irene and Vernon: Irene (whose accent suggests that she is an East Londoner of Maltese origins) and the ever silent Vernon (often referred to as Vern) first appeared in series two. They are the owners of a mobile burger van situated on the side of a motorway. During their sketches they are visited by a regular customer called Neville whom Irene tries to convince that she and Vernon have been visited by various celebrities. In their three appearances in Series 2, Irene claims to have been visited by Desmond Tutu, Mikhail Gorbachev, and Madonna. Neville almost always orders a double cheese with no sauce, and keeps a tab with Irene and Verne and always asks if he can "settle up on Friday." When Neville appears, Irene never knows the name of the celebrity in question and always attempts to describe them. Regular performers include Catherine Tate, Aschlin Ditta and Brian Murphy.
- Janice and Ray: A racist, xenophobic Northern couple, who express their disgust at meals they have been presented with at restaurants, usually based on either perceived over-pricing or the exotic nature of the food. They are also shown to be frustrated by the availability of such items in their locality, owing to comments such as "This were in Harrogate." After complaining about the food and prices, they use their most infamous catchphrase: "The dirty bastards!" or sometimes "The dirty, evil, robbing bastards!"

== Episodes ==
No. overall	No. in series	Title	Directed by	Written by	Original release date	UK viewers (millions)
7	1	"Episode 1"	Gordon Anderson	Catherine Tate, Derren Litten, Mathew Horne & Aschlin Ditta	21 July 2005	3.50
1. Lauren - Christian; 2. Derek Faye - Doctor; 3. Sandra Kemp - The Refuge; 4. Tactless Woman - Facial Hair; 5. Janice & Ray - Shiitake Mushrooms; 6. Paul & Sam - Lottery; 7. Sandra Kemp - The Refuge; 8. Tactless Woman - Stutter; 9. Sheila Carter - Funeral; 10. Old Woman - Television; 11. Sandra Kemp - The Refuge
8	2	"Episode 2"	Gordon Anderson	Catherine Tate, Derren Litten, Mathew Horne & Aschlin Ditta	28 July 2005	2.97
1. Aga Saga Woman - Geordie; 2. Sheila Carter - Taxi; 3. Lauren - New Top; 4. Moo Shepherd; 5. Bernie - Hypnosis; 6. Annoying Waitress - Business Lunch; 7. How Many How Much - Latin Dancer; 8. Moo Shepherd; 9. Irene & Verne - Desmond Tutu; 10. Old Woman - Doctor's Surgery; 11. How Many How Much - Pizza Quickie; 12. Moo Shepherd
9	3	"Episode 3"	Gordon Anderson	Catherine Tate & Aschlin Ditta	4 August 2005	2.89
1. Angie Barker - Dead Lady; 2. Tactless Woman - Birthmark; 3. Ivan & Trudy Get Knotted - A Day in the Life; 4. Lauren - Gym; 5. Derek Faye - Record Shop; 6. Paul & Sam - Chinese; 7. Irene & Verne - Pavarotti; 8. Ivan & Trudy Get Knotted - A Day in the Life; 9. Tactless Woman - Cleft Palate; 10. Annoying Waitress - Disco Dog; 11. Ivan & Trudy Get Knotted - A Day in the Life; 12. Old Woman - Hospital; 13. Annoying Waitress - Pensioner
10	4	"Episode 4"	Gordon Anderson	Catherine Tate & Aschlin Ditta	11 August 2005	3.55
1. Old Woman - Cheryl; 2. Derek Faye - Travel Agent; 3. Drunk Bride; 4. Crap Croupier Roulette; 5. Annoying Waitress - Jungle Pizza; 6. How Many How Much - Hairdresser; 7. Crap Croupier Roulette; 8. Drunk Bride; 9. Sheila Carter - Confessional; 10. Lauren - Tattoo; 11. Crap Croupier Roulette; 12. Irene & Verne - Gorbachev; 13. Drunk Bride; 14. How Many How Much - Phantom of the Opera Quickie; 15. Drunk Bride / Coda
11	5	"Episode 5"	Gordon Anderson	Catherine Tate, Aschlin Ditta & Steve Pemberton	18 August 2005	3.48
1. Paul & Sam - Fancy Dress; 2. Elaine Figgis, Woman of Courage - Gummidge; 3. Annoying Waitress - Family; 4. New Parents - Alphabet Game; 5. Bernie - Surgeon; 6. Elaine Figgis, Woman of Courage - Mohammed; 7. Old Woman - Funeral; 8. Sheila Carter - Cinema; 9. Irene & Verne - Madonna; 10. Elaine Figgis, Woman of Courage - Wedding; 11. Lauren - Teacher; 12. Elaine Figgis, Woman of Courage - Airport
12	6	"Episode 6"	Gordon Anderson	Catherine Tate, Jenny Lecoat & Aschlin Ditta	25 August 2005	3.92
1. Tactless Woman - Age Difference; 2. Janice & Ray - Vegetable Tempura; 3. Derek Faye - Newsagent; 4. How Many How Much - Swearing; 5. Boob Job Babe; 6. Lauren - Gay; 7. Paul & Sam - Reversal; 8. Janice & Ray - Escargot; 9. Tactless Woman - Charades; 10. How Many How Much - Pay Rise Quickie; 11. Old Woman - Tommy Upson
Special
13	–	"The Catherine Tate Christmas Show"	Christine Gernon	Catherine Tate	20 December 2005	5.66
Guest star Charlotte Church

== Release ==
=== Reception ===
No.	Title	Air date	Timeslot	UK viewers (millions)	Rank	Ref(s)
1	Episode 1	21 July 2005	Thursday 9.30pm	3,500,000	5	
2	Episode 2	28 July 2005	Thursday 9.30pm	2,970,000	5	
3	Episode 3	4 August 2005	Thursday 9.30pm	2,890,000	5	
4	Episode 4	11 August 2005	Thursday 9.30pm	3,550,000	4	
5	Episode 5	18 August 2005	Thursday 9.30pm	3,480,000	4	
6	Episode 6	25 August 2005	Thursday 9.30pm	3,920,000	3	
7	Christmas Special	20 December 2005	Tuesday 9.00pm	5,660,000	1	

=== Accolades ===
British Comedy Awards

- —Nominated: British Comedy Award for Best TV Comedy (2005: The Catherine Tate Show)
- —Nominated: British Comedy Award for Best TV Comedy Actress (2005: Catherine Tate)
- British Comedy Award for Best TV Comedy Actress (2006: Catherine Tate for The Catherine Tate Christmas Show)

British Academy Television Awards

- —Nominated: BAFTA Award for Best Comedy Programme or Series (2006: The Catherine Tate Show)
- —Nominated: Best Comedy Performance (Catherine Tate)

Royal Television Society

- RTS Television Award for Best Comedy Performance (2006: Catherine Tate)
- RTS Television Award for Entertainment (2006: The Catherine Tate Show)

National Television Awards

- —Nominated: National Television Award for Most Popular Comedy Programme (2006: The Catherine Tate Show)

=== Home media ===
The Complete Second Season was released on DVD on Region 1 in the United States and Canada on 25 March 2008 via Kultur White Star distribution. The Christmas Special was not included with the season two set; however, The Catherine Tate Christmas Show was released in a single DVD edition on 28 October 2008.

Series Two received its DVD release on Region 2 in the United Kingdom on 30 October 2006 with 2 Entertain distribution. The set contains The Catherine Tate Christmas Show, as it has not received single edition DVD release. In addition to the Christmas Special, which is listed as a special feature, the set includes a character sketch selection. Series Two also been released as part of the "Series One and Series Two" box set on 30 October 2006 and the "Complete Series One, Two and Three" box set on 12 November 2007.

Series Two was released on DVD on Region 4 in Australia on 5 April 2007. Similar to the Region 2 version, the set contains The Catherine Tate Christmas Show which is only available with series two. This series was also released as part of the "Series 1 & 2" box set and the "Complete Series One, Two and Three" box set.
