= The Catherine Tate Show series 1 =

The Catherine Tate Show
- Season 1
- Region 2 DVD cover
- No. of episodes: 6

Release
- Original network: BBC Two
- Original release: February 16 – March 22, 2004

Series chronology
- Next → Series 2

The first series of British television sketch comedy The Catherine Tate Show premiered on BBC Two on 16 February 2004. It consists of six episodes and concluded on 22 March 2004. In the first series audiences are introduced to various characters portrayed by Catherine Tate, including Joannie 'Nan' Taylor, Lauren Cooper and Bernie, the Irish nurse. The series was entirely written by Tate alongside Mathew Horne, Derren Litten, Aschlin Ditta, Arthur Mathews and Bruce Mackinnon.

The series premiered in the United States on 27 November 2004 on an unknown network and concluded on 21 February 2005.

Series one is the recipient of a BAFTA Award, British Comedy Award, and a Banff Rockie Award. It has received several nominations including a BAFTA Award, a British Comedy Award, a Royal Television Society Award and an International Emmy Award.

== Characters ==
- Joannie 'Nan' Taylor: The foul-mouthed grandmother is an old East London woman who constantly swears at and criticises other people. She is always visited by her well-mannered grandson Jamie, where the visits usually start off well enough, with the Nan showing how grateful she is that her grandson has come to see her. However, things usually take a turn for the worse after she starts to make unfavourable comments about her neighbours, family, and home help visitors. Jamie is a university student, but according to Nan, is unemployed. Nan repeatedly asserts that he is gay, although Jamie has said on many occasions that he has a girlfriend. Regular performances by Catherine Tate and Mathew Horne.
- Lauren Cooper: Lauren Cooper is a comprehensive school student with a bad attitude who is most widely known for her phrase "Am I bovvered?". Lauren, her best friend Lisa 'Liese' Jackson and her love interest Ryan Perkins are known as yobs. Regular performances by Catherine Tate, Mathew Horne and Niky Wardley.
- Bernie: The incompetent Irish nurse. Bernie is an unruly, randy woman who bordered on being sacked in the hospital where she worked in every episode. She frequently makes inappropriate remarks to her patients, flirts with most of the male staff, takes a critically ill patient on a wild night out, and mixes up the records of living patients with those of deceased ones. Regular performance by Catherine Tate.
- Paul and Sam: The Essex couple. They are happily married yet slightly simple, and find everyday situations surprisingly hilarious. Paul and Sam often excitedly tell each other stories, which they find highly amusing and interesting. The stories build up and when completed, Paul and Sam would both produce an exaggerated and completely silent laugh. Regular performances by Catherine Tate and Lee Ross.
- Kate and Ellen: This sketch follows two office workers who sit next to each other. While Ellen is usually keen to get on with her work, she is frequently disturbed by Kate (Tate). Kate continually makes conversation about her lifestyle, inviting her co-worker to "Have a guess!" on such delicate situations. While Ellen is reluctant to go along with the guessing games, she is pressured into making a wild guess, which almost always results in Kate becoming insulted and consequently offensive. Ellen occasionally guesses correctly, causing Kate to become angry and verbally or physically abusive towards her. Regular performances by Catherine Tate and Ella Kenion.
- Elaine Figgis: Elaine is a woman who appears in a documentary following her search for love, mostly corresponding with men around the world via the Internet. The unseen interviewer and narrator called Tanya follows her engagement and eventual marriage to a convicted cannibal and lunatic on Death Row in the US, who abducted, tortured and murdered eight people, proceeding to eat two of them. Regular performance by Catherine Tate and Rebecca Front as the voice of Tanya.
- The Aga Saga Woman: An upper-middle-class woman who goes into a state of shock in various, seemingly innocuous situations. Regular performance by Catherine Tate.

== Episodes ==
No. overall	No. in series	Title	Directed by	Written by	Original release date	UK viewers (millions)
1	1	"Episode 1"	Gordon Anderson	Catherine Tate, Derren Litten, Mathew Horne & Aschlin Ditta	16 February 2004	N/A (<2.40) (Note: Not reported in the weekly top 15 programmes for four-screen viewer ratings.)
1. Frightened Woman - Cereal; 2. Not Drunk Enough; 3. Lauren - Beyoncé; 4. Botox Babe; 5. Nan - Home Help; 6. Aga Saga Woman - Egg; 7. New Parents Car Party; 8. How Many How Much - Weight; 9. Frightened Woman - Mobile; 10. New Parents Car Party; 11. How Many How Much - Extras; 12. Paul & Sam - Spaniel; 13. New Parents Car Party; 14. Frightened Woman - Toast; 15. Enigmatic Cop - Scrapyard; 16. How Many How Much - House; 17. Enigmatic Cop - Scrapyard
2	2	"Episode 2"	Gordon Anderson	Catherine Tate, Derren Litten, Mathew Horne & Aschlin Ditta	23 February 2004	N/A (<2.40)
1. Frightened Woman - Birthday; 2. Info Woman - Lost Mother; 3. Bernie - Photocopier; 4. Frightened Woman - Posti-It Note; 5. Nan - Charles Manson; 6. Info Woman - Jumper; 7. Paul & Sam - Catalogue; 8. Drunk Estate Agent; 9. Lauren - Party; 10. Elaine Figgis, Woman of Courage - Death Row Wife; 11. Info Woman - Glazier; 12. Nan - Piccalilli; 13. Frightened Woman - Microwave; 14. Elaine Figgis, Woman of Courage - Death Row Wife
3	3	"Episode 3"	Gordon Anderson	Catherine Tate, Derren Litten & Arthur Mathews	1 March 2004	N/A (<2.08)
1. Lauren - Conductor; 2. Aga Saga Woman - Olive Oil; 3. Frightened Woman - Sneeze; 4. Enigmatic Cop - Warehouse; 5. Paul & Sam - Not Turned Up; 6. Bunty -Trophy; 7. Valley Girl; 8. Bernie - New Nurse; 9. Valley Girl; 10. Nan - Window Cleaner; 11. Frightened Woman - Hiccups; 12. Elaine Figgis, Woman of Courage - Death Row Wife; 13. Valley Girl; 14. Frightened Woman - Crisps
4	4	"Episode 4"	Gordon Anderson	Catherine Tate, Derren Litten & Aschlin Ditta	8 March 2004	N/A (<2.37)
1. Paul & Sam - Zimbabwe; 2. Backhander Woman - Windscreen; 3. Bunty - Flashdance; 4. Paul & Sam - Cafetière; 5. Backhander Woman - Wholefood Shop; 6. New Parents - Driving; 7. Paul & Sam - Human Resources; 8. How Many How Much - Kids; 9. Backhander Woman - Mime; 10. Lauren - Note; 11. How Many How Much - Holiday; 12. Nan - Meals on Wheels; 13. How Many How Much - Sandwich; 14. New Parents
5	5	"Episode 5"	Gordon Anderson	Catherine Tate, Derren Litten, Arthur Mathews & Mathew Horne	15 March 2004	N/A (<2.33)
1. Last Hit Woman - Boardroom; 2. Aga Saga Woman - Brie; 3. Last Hit Woman - Lift; 4. Lady Clown - Original; 5. Last Hit Woman - Lift; 6. Bernie - Mr Willis; 7. Last Hit Woman - Car Accident; 8. Bunty - Stalker; 9. Lady Clown - Face Painting; 10. Last Hit Woman - Ambulance; 11. Martin Webb - Train; 12. Lady Clown - Balloons; 13. Enigmatic Cop - Riverside; 14. Last Hit Woman - Hospital; 15. Nan - Pound Shop; 16. Last Hit Woman - Cemetery; 17. Bunty
6	6	"Episode 6"	Gordon Anderson	Catherine Tate, Derren Litten, Mathew Horne, Bruce Mackinnon & Aschlin Ditta	22 March 2004	N/A (<2.20)
1. Frightened Woman - Restaurant; 2. How Many How Much - Cornwall; 3. Elaine Figgis, Woman of Courage - Death Row Wife - Execution; 4. How Many How Much - Run; 5. Bernie - Assessment; 6. Lauren - Ryan; 7. Frightened Woman - Call Me Back; 8. Bunty - Restraining Order; 9. Frightened Woman - Champagne; 10. How Many How Much - What Am I Thinking?; 11. Nan - Ugly Baby

== Release ==
=== Reception ===
No.	Title	Air date	Timeslot	UK viewers (millions)	Rank	Ref(s)
1	Episode 1	16 February 2004	Monday 10.00pm	Under 2,404,000	—	
2	Episode 2	23 February 2004	Monday 10.00pm	Under 2,080,000	—	
3	Episode 3	1 March 2004	Monday 10.00pm	Under 2,237,000	—	
4	Episode 4	8 March 2004	Monday 10.00pm	Under 2,372,000	—	
5	Episode 5	15 March 2004	Monday 10.00pm	Under 2,331,000	—	
6	Episode 6	22 March 2004	Monday 9.30pm	Under 2,198,000	—	

=== Accolades ===
Royal Television Society 2004

- —Nominated: RTS Award for Best Make Up Design - Entertainment and Non-Drama Productions (Vanessa White)

Banff World Television Festival 2004

- Banff Rockie Award for Best Comedy (Tiger Aspect Productions)

British Comedy Awards 2004

- British Comedy Award for Best Comedy Newcomer (Catherine Tate)
- —Nominated: British Comedy Award for Best TV Comedy Actress (Catherine Tate)

British Academy Television Awards 2005

- BAFTA Award for Best Comedy Programme or Series (Catherine Tate, Gordon Anderson & Geoffrey Perkins)
- —Nominated: BAFTA Award for Best New Writer (Catherine Tate & Darren Litten)

International Emmy Awards 2005

- —Nominated: International Emmy Award for Best Actress (Catherine Tate)

=== Home media ===
"The Complete First Season" was released on DVD Region 1 in the United States and Canada on 25 September 2007 from White Star distribution.

"Series One" was released on DVD Region 2 in the United Kingdom on 22 August 2005 via 2 Entertain distribution. Special features contain the 2005 Comic Relief Appearance and a behind the scenes interview with Catherine Tate on how the characters came about. It was subsequently released as part of "Series One and Series Two" DVD on 30 October 2006, and as part of "Complete Series One, Two & Three" DVD on 12 November 2007. A UMD (Universal Media Disc), which is only compatible with the PlayStation Portable, of the first series was made available from 2 Entertain on 12 December 2005.

"Series One" was released on DVD Region 4 in Australia on 7 November 2007 via Hopscotch Entertainment. Prior to the individual release of the first series, a box set continuing the first two series was released on 6 September 2007, and a box set comprising all three series was released on 2 April 2009.

== U.S. airdates ==
Episode	Airdate
1	27 November 2004
2	18 December 2004
3	17 January 2005
4	24 January 2005
5	14 February 2005
6	21 February 2005
