= List of Game On episodes =

Game On is a British television sitcom created by Bernadette Davis and Andrew Davies and produced by Hat Trick Productions for BBC Two. The series stars Ben Chaplin, Matthew Cottle and Samantha Janus as three flatmates living in London. Chaplin departed the series following the first series and was replaced by Neil Stuke for the remainder of the show's run. (Note: After series one, Ben Chaplin was cast in the film The Truth About Cats & Dogs and further Hollywood films. For series two, his part was given to Neil Stuke who had been the second choice for the part of Matthew at the first series auditions. At the end of the first episode of series two, the substitution of Stuke for Chaplin is acknowledged in a post-credits scene. The trio are watching Roseanne which had previously referenced the change in actresses playing Becky by having the cast watch TV and comment on actors changing and no one noticing, then looking at Becky. In Game On, Martin asks "I wonder who's playing the daughter this week?!" to which Mandy remarks: "Don't you just hate that, when they keep the same character and change the actor?" Both Mandy and Martin then look subtly yet strangely accusingly at Matt, sitting between them on the sofa, who looks worried.)

During the course of the programme, 18 episodes of Game On aired over three series, between 27 February 1995 and 6 February 1998.

== Series overview ==
Series
Series	Episodes	Originally released	
Series	Episodes	First released	Last released
1	6	27 February 1995	10 April 1995
2	6	16 September 1996	21 October 1996
3	6	2 January 1998	6 February 1998

== Episodes ==
=== Series 1 (1995) ===
The first series did not broadcast in the intended order it was scheduled, therefore leading to several continuity errors when the episodes aired out of order. The episodes are listed in order of broadcast date.

No. overall	No. in series	Title (Note: The boxing-themed Big Wednesday was originally scheduled as the first episode on 27 February 1995, but two days beforehand the real-life boxing match Nigel Benn vs. Gerald McClellan ended with the latter in a coma. In response, the BBC brought forward Working Girls, which had originally been scheduled as the second episode on 6 March. Subsequent episodes were screened as shown below, and were presumably in the intended order, except that Big Wednesday was eventually shown fifth, after McClellan had emerged from the coma. Big Wednesday being shown so late introduces a continuity error, in that it is during the episode that Mandy accidentally uses Matthew's surfboard as an ironing board, leaving it with the prominent burn visible "earlier" in Matthew, A Suitable Case for Treatment. However, the damage is not visible when the surfboard is seen in The Great Escape and Bad Timing, suggesting that those episodes should actually appear before both Big Wednesday and Matthew... The order in which the episodes were broadcast initially and in the 1996 repeat season also introduce a continuity error regarding Mandy's debt. In The Great Escape, Matthew states that Mandy owes rent of "2 thousand quid". In Matthew..., Matthew lets Mandy off "between 2 and 3 thousand quid rent", which implies the debt has been mounting up since The Great Escape.: When first repeated in early 1996, the episodes were shown in the following order: Big Wednesday (4 January 1996) Matthew - A Suitable Case for Treatment (11 January 1996) The Great Escape (18 January 1996) Bad Timing (25 January 1996) Working Girls (1 February 1996) Fame (8 February 1996) / On the VHS and DVD releases, the following order was used: Big Wednesday Working Girls The Great Escape Bad Timing Matthew - A Suitable Case for Treatment Fame)	Directed by	Written by	Original release date
2	2	"Working Girls"	John Stroud	Bernadette Davis and Andrew Davies	27 February 1995
It is the birthday of 23-year-old ginger virgin bank clerk Martin Henson (Matthew Cottle). His laddish landlord Matthew Malone (Ben Chaplin) hires a call girl named Kim (Nina Young) as Martin's present, which does not go to plan due to Martin's nerves. Matthew's other lodger, Amanda "Mandy" Wilkins (Samantha Janus), is fed up of her life; working as a temp-basis secretary, money troubles, and an endless stream of men who just want to have sex with her. Mandy is offered a research job by Ron Grimshawe (Dave Hill), a middle-aged Northern, Booker Prize-nominated author of books including Underdog and Blood Pudding - which include childhood bedwetting stories that resonated with Mandy - but the job "researching mines in Yorkshire" does not exist. Mandy imagines telling Ron to go "research your own pants", but ends up having sex with him, to her own disgust at herself. As Matt, Martin and Mandy sit on the sofa at the flat at the end of the evening, Matt mocks them both, and Martin uncharacteristically loses his temper, getting Matt in a chokehold and pulling his right ear.
5	5	"Matthew, A Suitable Case for Treatment"	John Stroud	Bernadette Davis and Andrew Davies	6 March 1995
Landlord Matthew is suffering from both agoraphobia and insomnia, keeping his lodgers up at night playing loud music and dancing around the flat. Matt is also getting increasingly bored and frustrated whilst his lodgers are at work during the day, since Matt never goes outside due to acute agoraphobia, and the episode follows Matt's daily exploits alone inside the flat. These include going through Mandy's knicker drawer, making homemade videos, and reenacting scenes from Reservoir Dogs as Michael Madsen and Taxi Driver as Robert De Niro, during which he passes out after cutting his leg. He begins flirting with a pizza delivery driver (Anna Galvin) over the phone, but when she arrives, Matt's agoraphobia causes him to chicken out at the door. Mandy brings her new fella Sean (Ian Embleton) home to find Matt laid in her bed wearing her knickers, and Sean tells Mandy that he is gay and fancies Matt, causing Mandy and Sean to break up.
4	4	"Bad Timing"	John Stroud	Bernadette Davis and Andrew Davies	13 March 1995
Matt is worried about being left alone in the flat forever, as Mandy is in a new yet apparently semi-serious relationship, and with Martin leaving the flat and the area to pursue a career in teaching. Matt starts to interview young women for the vacancy, but ends up frightening them all off by offering them sex and "rating" them on their sexual attractiveness. Martin eventually returns after his first day as a substitute teacher after having been beaten, stripped and sprayed with fire extinguishers by the children, and tells Matt that he is going back to work at the bank and will not be moving out after all. After Martin passes out, Matt pretends that he has been in a coma for years and that he has married Mandy, before still trying to rent his room out to attractive women. Meanwhile, despite being in a relationship for only a week, Mandy already feels trapped and bored, leading her to cheating with another man on a night out with her best friend, Martin's older sister Claudia (Rebecca Lacey). The next evening, Mandy resolves to be committed to her boyfriend from now on, only to go to her boyfriend's family meal and discover that her boyfriend and illicit lover are brothers. The episode features the first acting appearance of Zawe Ashton, as one of the 7th-year school children that beat up Martin.
3	3	"The Great Escape"	John Stroud	Bernadette Davis and Andrew Davies	20 March 1995
Monday morning and Matt fantasises about being a model (featuring a cameo appearance by Michaela Strachan as his photographer), Martin dreams of dating his German co-worker Renate, and Mandy dreams of being a high-flying executive dating Tom Cruise. Matthew entertains himself whilst the others are at work by skateboarding around the flat dressed up as The Man With No Name, and disastrously making conversation out of the window with the "Winona Ryder-lookalike" in the garden next door. Mandy is six months behind on her rent, and Matt threatens to evict her unless she has sex with him, before he then threatens to evict both Mandy and Martin when he mistakenly suspects they are having sex with each other in secret. Mandy is not too concerned since such threats are common with Matt, and also because she has a date with an alleged Bermudan millionaire. The episode ends with Matt going to make a cup of tea for everyone for the first and only time, and putting his foot in his trilby hat which is filled with Mandy's vomit.
1	1	"Big Wednesday"	John Stroud	Bernadette Davis and Andrew Davies	27 March 1995
Mandy gets a new boyfriend, Paul "The Rage" Johnson (David Harewood), a famous middleweight boxer and rich fashion designer, who to Matthew's disgust is Northern. Matthew says that he could "have him", but is actually terrified in his presence. As Paul gears up for a big fight, Matt must cope with the damage which Paul and Mandy unwittingly inflict on his surfboard, Matt's most underused yet most prized and beloved possession. Martin is desperate for a girlfriend and meets pretty American girl Nancy (Lisa Orgolini) whilst out collecting curries for Matt - and Martin is shocked when Nancy shows an interest in him and arranges a date. The date goes surprisingly well and they go back to hers. Martin goes out to buy condoms but forgets where Nancy's flat is, so he goes home. He tells Matt and Mandy what happened and accidentally drops his cigarette down his front. After mocking Martin a bit too much, Mandy gets her own back on Matt by revealing that she burnt Matt's surfboard using it as an ironing board. Mandy decides to break up with Paul due to worrying about him fighting, and everybody expecting her to be a page 3 girl.
6	6	"Fame"	John Stroud	Bernadette Davis and Andrew Davies	10 April 1995
Matthew is left alone in the flat as Mandy goes away for the weekend on the pull with some posh university friends, and Martin goes out with his workmate Wally Bazoum. A loud, politically-charged student rock band, "Proactive", move into the flat above, disturbing Matt with their band practices. Since he is alone, Matt reluctantly leaves the flat for the first time, to confront them about the noise. Bumping into their angry singer on the way out due to a bust-up, Matt falls unconscious outside their door having been overcome by his agoraphobia. After coming to in the flat above, Matt becomes the band's new vocalist, envisioning himself as a rock star, despite quickly clashing with the band over Matt wanting to "sex up" the lyrics and thrusting his groin at or "shagging" the mic stand. However, when the band get their first gig at local pub The Spotted Dog, attended by a record label scout and reporters, and without a vocalist, they desperately drag Matt outside, wrapped up in sheets whilst having an anxiety attack. At the gig, Matt's agoraphobia causes him to merely scream and wail on stage, to the confusion of the audience and the horror of his bandmates. The performance is given a shining review in Dogs Bollox magazine, which declares "a star is born", but the experience causes Matt to no longer want to be a rock star. Meanwhile, Mandy has a terrible weekend away, showing herself up to relatives of royalty by urinating in public.

=== Series 2 (1996) ===
No. overall	No. in series	Title (Note: Despite the official titles appearing onscreen at the start of each episode, advance artwork for the VHS releases showed alternative titles on the cover. Notably, the provisional artwork also showed the actual video release names the wrong way round, with the last three episodes titled "Second Match - Round 1" and the first three as "Second Match - Round 2". The episode titles on (Round 1) were: Hostages, Matthew's Secret Journal, and Nightwatch, whereas (Round 2) featured the episodes: Martin's First Date, Agoraphobics, Homosexuals & Virgins, and The Big Day Out.)	Directed by	Written by	Original release date
7	1	"Roundheads & Cavaliers"	John Stroud	Bernadette Davis and Andrew Davies	16 September 1996
Matthew (now portrayed by Neil Stuke after the departure of Ben Chaplin) begins wearing pale make-up, claiming he is "at death's door", and role-playing as a vampire after reading the books of Anne Rice. When Matt tries to "drink the blood of a fresh ginger virgin", Martin ends up in hospital with a head injury, where he dares to ask out Clare (Tracy Keating), the Irish trainee nurse who treats him. On the date, Clare says that she is looking to lose her virginity to somebody experienced, which she wrongly assumes Martin is. They arrange for Clare to visit the next evening, and Martin is terrified. Meanwhile, after ending her relationship with "The Rage", Mandy has been successfully celibate for a whole fortnight. In an attempt to ease Martin's self-image issues, Mandy offers to look at his penis in a "consultative capacity", and Matt walks in on this compromising situation. When Clare comes round, Matt tries to seduce her, at first playing the sympathy card due to the deaths of his parents, but Matt's attempt at seduction fails miserably, and he is beaten up by her. Clare stays the night with Martin and they lose their virginities together.
8	2	"Slime Surfers & Jissom Monkeys"	John Stroud	Bernadette Davis and Andrew Davies	23 September 1996
Mandy begins attending Italian lessons and resists the advances of her Italian teacher Marco (Oliver Haden) despite her attraction to him, and Marco very mistakenly thinks her new-found vow of celibacy means she is a virgin. Martin is over the moon about the fact that he has lost his virginity and has a nurse as a girlfriend, but flatmates Matt and Mandy are quickly tired of hearing about it. With Martin constantly going out for "shags with Clare", and Mandy staying in a lot more due to her celibacy, flat-bound Matt tells Mandy that Martin is a traitor and Mandy is his new best friend. Mandy is terrified of becoming "the new Martin", but when they get drunk on the sofa together one night Matt confides to her about his agoraphobia, how it feels, and how it was the death of his parents which had caused it. Mandy brings round her old college friend Jason (Mark Powley) under the pretence that he is Mandy's cousin, when in fact he is a psychologist that Mandy wants to help Matt. Unbeknown to Matt, who thinks Jason is "a double-hard bastard" and his new best friend, Jason is homosexual, and he falls for Matt when Matt kisses him showing him "how to get girls" and wrestles with him on the bed semi-naked.
9	3	"Double Hard Bastards & Girly Shirt-lifting Tosspieces"	John Stroud	Bernadette Davis and Andrew Davies	30 September 1996
Despite his relationship with nurse Clare, Martin has difficulty sleeping due to a rash, and is paranoid and jealous imagining Clare's boss at the hospital, Dr Harding, fancying her. It turns out Dr Harding is a woman, but not before Martin embarrasses himself in front of a restaurant full of people demanding to know if Harding's "pubes are ginger" like his. Meanwhile, Marco is still attempting to date Mandy, after having wrongly inferred that she is a virgin. This quickly stops when Marco walks in on Matt showing Jason one of his home videos - that is, secretly filming Mandy having sex with an unknown man - to the viewing of Marco. Matt becomes a lot closer to Jason, even dropping his "double-hard bastard" persona around him and showing to Jason a sensitive side that he never shows to Martin and Mandy. Matt however is completely unaware of two things about Jason; that Jason is a psychologist attempting to help him with his agoraphobia, and also completely unaware that Jason is gay and in love with him. Jason successfully goads Matt into going outside to the park, but not without Matt clinging to his surfboard, wearing American football gear, and with Matt being completely terrified of even the ducks; Matt also tries to kill a pigeon which crapped on his surfboard. For his second trip outside, Jason tries to drop a hint to Matt by taking him to a gay gym, but Matt is still completely unaware. For his final trip outside, Matt feels much more confident and goes out alone. At the shop Matt saves the newsagent from an armed robber by knocking the robber unconscious with the surfboard. The newsagent's young daughter helps Matt get home with him clutching a reward: a huge bag of confectionery, but the experience causes Matt's agoraphobia to get even worse after seemingly confirming his fears that the outside world is full of crime and danger.
10	4	"Heavy Bondage & Custard Creams"	John Stroud	Bernadette Davis and Andrew Davies	7 October 1996
Mandy is contacted by an old boyfriend from her school days, Stoat (an early appearance by Eddie Marsan), who says that he has been in the Navy for years, and Mandy invites him round to the flat. Mandy gets into her old school outfit for when he comes round, and Stoat turns up in a fine suit. Mandy introduces him to Matt and Martin, and as they all watch a news bulletin on the television about a prison break, they discover that Stoat has really been in Brixton prison and has recently escaped. This revelation causes Stoat to brandish a hidden snubnosed revolver and he ties everybody up in the flat. Stoat reveals he got his suit from some "ginger tosser" - which of course turns out to be Martin, whom Stoat has left naked and tied-up in the park and where a dog is interested in his genitals. Mandy breaks her celibacy vow to seduce Stoat, and she ties him up and takes the gun. She lets him escape before ringing the police. After the hostage crisis, in front of everyone, Clare reveals that Jason is gay, and Jason uses the opportunity to tell Matt that he is love with him. Matt is at first horrified, but when Jason leaves, Matt is secretly sad to have lost the friendship. Later, Clare announces to Martin that they want different things and she breaks up with him. Matt and Martin stay up late and find Stoat's handgun down the back of the sofa. Martin, depressed over Clare leaving him, suggests that they play Russian roulette. Matt plays along, believing the gun not to be loaded, but he fires it and the bullet destroys the television.
11	5	"Tangerine Candyfloss & Herne Bay Rock"	John Stroud	Bernadette Davis and Andrew Davies	14 October 1996
After Jason's departure, Matt has started to write a dramatic "journal of destiny" which he announces the existence of to Martin and Mandy. Matt keeps it under lock and key and will not let them read it due to it being "not for gingers or women". Mandy tries to prove to herself that she has matured, by going on a date with her old Philosophy teacher Brian Kennedy (Matthew Marsh), whom she once fancied in college. Mandy goes back to Brian's home but she manages to resist his advances, and is glad she does when she finds out Brian is married to her old classmate Julia (Elaine Lordan), when Julia comes home early unexpectedly. Martin is depressed about his breakup with Clare, leading Mandy to send round to the flat her attractive friend Hannah (Rebecca Blake) who is attracted to red-haired men. Matt attempts to seduce Hannah but fails miserably, and she labels him a "five star dickhead"; Hannah instead kisses Martin and asks Martin out on a date, much to Matt's horror at a girl not fancying him but fancying Martin. Martin turns Hannah down, saying that he is still in love with his ex. Mandy and Martin eventually find Matt's secretive memoirs accidentally laid out to read, and discover his middle name is "Norman". Matt emerges from the bathroom after having dyed his hair and eyebrows fluorescent orange to become a "ginger tosser" and "fanny magnet" like Martin.
12	6	"Bruce Willis & Robert De Niro Holding A Fish"	John Stroud	Bernadette Davis and Andrew Davies	21 October 1996
Matt's dislike of Northerners means that he is disgusted to find out that Mandy's latest boyfriend Patrick (Daniel Taylor) is a scouser. Matt is however secretly impressed by Patrick, a comedian, when Patrick shows Matt his stand-up routine, which includes the catchphrase "I'm only doing this for a shag" and doing impressions of "Bruce Willis holding a fish". When alone, Matt begins to practise his own stand-up routine talking about "ginger students". Martin is becoming more depressed over Clare leaving him, so much so that he will not even make Matt a cup of tea, as it reminds him of her. He follows Clare to church when she finishes work at the hospital, only to nearly get beaten up by a man who was praying (Richard Strange). Martin takes up a job at Nightwatch, a crisis hotline for people suffering from depression, which Matt believes is a plan to bring the population down. Matt rings up pretending to be Clare's new boyfriend to annoy Martin. The next caller is a transvestite named Frank, whom Martin believes is another of Matt's prank calls, and so Martin verbally abuses him, causing Frank to take an overdose. Matt is rung up at the flat by Tesni (Lou Gish), a suicidal girl whom Martin gave the flat number out to earlier on, but Matt is alone. To try save her life, Matt forces himself to go to her house, and is beaten up by an old woman on the way. Matt arrives at Tesni's house, to discover that some of her friends have come round and Tesni is alright, but Matt's agoraphobia causes him to pass out in Tesni's hallway. Matt wakes up in the hospital, where he is watched over by Tesni's friend Susie (Fay Masterson). Matt and Susie share a kiss, and Matt is bemused to discover that she is a ginger student. They are soon joined at the hospital by Mandy and Patrick, who has been beaten up at his gig due to Bruce Willis's cousin being in the audience and taking offence at Patrick's impersonations. They are further joined by Martin, who has pretended to have taken an overdose to get closer to Clare; she beats Martin up. Matt gives up on his dream of becoming a comedian, and instead considers becoming a student like Susie.

=== Series 3 (1998) ===
No. overall	No. in series	Title	Directed by	Written by	Original release date
13	1	"Palms, Pigs and Bad Debts"	John Stroud	Bernadette Davis	2 January 1998
A year on, and Mandy still has not progressed beyond writing the first page of her novel, and Martin is still not over Clare. Matt's agoraphobia has not improved, which led Matt to dump Susie because she wanted him to go outside. Instead, Matt has taken to "shagging his teddy bear", which Mandy walks in on. Matt begins to study "girl stuff", such as horoscopes, astrology, fortune telling and palm-reading. Matt does not believe in it, but believes it will help him to get sex. Whilst the others are at work, Matt answers the door to an imposing woman, Tess Freeman (Evelyn Doggart), who is looking for Mandy. Matt tries it on with Tess but she thinks his palm reading is nonsense, and upon seeing her large hands he gets the wrong idea and says "You're a sex change!" which leads her to crush Matt's genitals and tell him that she is, in fact, not. Mandy has started a new job as a personal assistant to a privileged yet bored Old Etonian, Archie Glenister (Crispin Bonham-Carter), who is shocked at her candid and crude conversation. Mandy comes home to great distress at hearing Tess Freeman visited the flat looking for her, telling the others that Tess is a debt collector seeking to collect over £9,000 which Mandy owes but does not have. Martin promises to lend £5,000 to Mandy, but he instead lends the money to Clare. Matt says that he will let Mandy off with the six months rent she owes him if she has sex with him, to which she initially agrees, but freaks him out by sniffing his armpits, so he does not go through with it. Matt takes revenge by ringing Tess and telling her where Mandy works. Tess finds Mandy at work, but Archie, who has an expected inheritance of £4 million and is attracted to Mandy, pays off Mandy's debts by cheque. Tess is happy that she has closed a case without beating anyone up (except Matt), and Mandy is so relieved she kisses Archie, which causes him to be pleasantly dumbstruck. Mandy pays Matthew her rent arrears in 50p coins from Martin's 'Clare Box'.
14	2	"Martin's Baby"	John Stroud	Bernadette Davis	9 January 1998
Matt enlists Martin to sort his VHS film collection. Martin and Mandy go to a video shop where they see Clare, who is with her baby daughter Rosie. Martin was unaware of Rosie's existence; Clare tells him that he is the father. Clare does not want him involved, but changes her mind when she needs someone to look after Rosie whilst Clare and her date go to a dinner party. Mandy starts to date her boss Archie, although she is interested in him mostly for his wealth.
15	3	"Marines and Vacuum Cleaner"	John Stroud	Bernadette Davis	16 January 1998
Matt decides he wants to join the Marines and decks the flat out. Archie brings round his old Marine pals to chat to Matt about it, but Matt has had an accident with a vacuum cleaner that Claire is still trying to remove.
16	4	"Crabs"	John Stroud	Bernadette Davis	23 January 1998
Claire decides Martin would be a terrible father. Mandy passes out while trying to cook for Archie's family. Martin and Matt put on their best behaviour and knock up a meal. However, Archie's sister mistakenly believes Rosie is Mandy's and that they are just after Archie's money.
17	5	"Laura"	John Stroud	Bernadette Davis	30 January 1998
Matt starts having sex with Laura, the attractive woman who lives upstairs, but because of his previous false boasts of sexual success, Mandy and Martin do not believe him. Even sharing her intimate sex secrets and producing her underwear fails to convince them. Claire decides to emigrate with her hunky new Australian boyfriend, taking Rosie with them. Martin gains legal advice from a misogynistic solicitor.
18	6	"Wedding Day"	John Stroud	Bernadette Davis	6 February 1998
In the final episode, Martin gets a postcard from Claire in Australia informing him that she has married Shane. Martin meets a new girl, Rachel, at Mandy's hen night who is very similar to Claire (because she is also played by Tracy Keating) and immediately proceeds to buy her a nurse's outfit and wig and asks her to speak with an Irish accent. It is Mandy's wedding day to Archie, Mandy is getting cold feet but goes to church, and Matt is smuggled to the church in the boot of a car (the episode features the song The View From Here by Dubstar as Mandy walks down the stairs in her bride's dress). Archie dies whilst trying to get pulled over for speeding on the way to church to fulfill his final obligatory challenge set by his old Marine unit. The show ends with Mandy "going a funny colour" as she realises she is stuck in the flat forever, and Matt asks Mart to make her a cup of tea.
