= Guy Jenkin =

British writer

- Born: 27 April 1955 (age 71); London, England
- Education: Trinity College Cambridge
- Spouse: Bernadette Davis
- Children: Jack J, Louis Jenkin, Lara Jenkin

Guy Jenkin (born 27 April 1955) is a British film director and comedy writer who is best known for working together with Andy Hamilton on sitcoms and comedies such as Drop the Dead Donkey (1990–1998), Outnumbered (2007–2014), and Ballot Monkeys (2015).

== Early life ==
He attended Trinity College, Cambridge.

== Career ==
He wrote the 2002 satirical comedy Jeffrey Archer: The Truth, with Damian Lewis portraying Jeffrey Archer, and the 2003 drama film The Sleeping Dictionary, starring Jessica Alba.

Jenkin also contributed to the popular 2006–2007 BBC series Life on Mars, writing the sixth episode of the second series about heroin in 1973 and the Asian community. The episode explores racism at the time.

In 2024, he and Hamilton created a stage show featuring original cast members of Drop the Dead Donkey which toured theatres in the UK. He has also written and is directing a film about the Tudors, titled Fools.

Jenkin's novel Murder Most Foul, about the killing of Christopher Marlowe, was shortlisted for the 2025 Bollinger Everyman Wodehouse Prize.

== Personal life ==
Jenkin is married to Bernadette Davis, the creator and writer of Some Girls. He lives in Balham in south London.
