= Wilderness (1996 TV series) =

- Based on: Wilderness by Dennis Danvers
- Written by: Andrew Davies; Bernadette Davis
- Directed by: Ben Bolt
- Starring: See below
- Composer: Robert Lockhart
- Country of origin: United Kingdom
- Original language: English
- No. of series: 1
- No. of episodes: 3

Production
- Executive producers: Linda James; Jenny Reeks
- Producer: Tim Vaughan
- Editor: Michael Parkinson
- Running time: 174 minutes 100 minutes (American DVD version)
- Production companies: Red Rooster Film & Television Entertainment; Carlton Television

Original release
- Network: ITV
- Release: 30 September – 14 October 1996

Wilderness is a 1996 British drama directed by Ben Bolt. It is based on a 1991 novel of the same name by Dennis Danvers. The horror series was produced by Red Rooster Film & Television Entertainment in association with Carlton Television for the ITV network.

== Plot ==
A disturbed young woman (Alice) has trouble convincing her lover that she is a wolf, and her psychiatrist is sure he has discovered a new complex that will make his name. She moves to a retreat in Scotland, where she morphs permanently into a wolf.

== Cast ==
- Amanda Ooms as Alice White
- Owen Teale as Dan Somers
- Michael Kitchen as Luther Adams
- Gemma Jones as Jane Garth
- Johanna Benyon as Serena
- Molly Bolt as Dan's daughter
- Mark Caven as Chuck
- Jim Dunk as Butcher
- David Gillespie as Maurice
- Mary Healey as Nurse
- Terence Hillyer as Carl
- Catherine Holman as Young Alice
- Brigitte Kahn as Alice's mother
- Val Lehman as Vet
- Nicholas Lumley as Alice's father
- Rosalind March as Eleanor
- Philip McGough as Marcus
- Liz Moscrop as Luther's receptionist
- Gerard O'Hare as Kevin
- Catherine Russell as Deborah
- Nina Thomas as Sarah
- Rupert Vansittart as Jeremy
- Daniel Wilson as Darren (as James Wilson)
