= Lost Souls (2000 film) =

Film by Janusz Kamiński

- Theatrical release poster
- Directed by: Janusz Kamiński
- Screenplay by: Pierce Gardner
- Story by: Betsy Stahl; Pierce Gardner
- Produced by: Meg Ryan; Nina R. Sadowsky
- Starring: Winona Ryder; Ben Chaplin; Philip Baker Hall; Elias Koteas; Sarah Wynter; John Hurt
- Cinematography: Mauro Fiore
- Edited by: Anne Goursaud; Andrew Mondshein (recut)
- Music by: Jan A. P. Kaczmarek
- Production companies: Castle Rock Entertainment (uncredited); Avery Pix; Prufrock Pictures
- Distributed by: New Line Cinema
- Release date: October 13, 2000
- Running time: 97 minutes
- Country: United States
- Language: English
- Budget: $28 million
- Box office: $31.4 million

Lost Souls is a 2000 American apocalyptic supernatural horror film directed by Janusz Kamiński in his directorial debut, and starring Winona Ryder, Ben Chaplin, Elias Koteas, and John Hurt. The plot focuses on a devout Catholic woman who becomes convinced through the decoding of ciphers that a successful writer has been designated by Satan to become the antichrist.

Completed in 1998 from a screenplay by Pierce Gardner and co-produced by Meg Ryan, Lost Souls was delayed from theatrical release due to the saturation of similarly themed horror films at the nearing of the millennium, such as Stigmata and End of Days (both released in 1999). It was released theatrically in the United States by New Line Cinema on October 13, 2000, to critical and commercial failure, grossing $31.4 million against a $28 million budget and was panned by critics.

== Plot ==
Maya Larkin, a devout Roman Catholic who works as a schoolteacher for a New York City diocese, accompanies Father Lareaux, Father Jeremy, and John Townsend to a psychiatric clinic to exorcise Henry Birdson, who has been experiencing epileptic seizures and obsessively scribbling a mysterious series of numbers. The exorcism is unsuccessful, however, as Henry falls into a coma and Father Lareaux is weakened. Maya smuggles Henry's notes out and, via polyalphabetic substitution, she translates the numbers and receives the name "Peter Kelson". Maya then learns from television that Peter Kelson is a writer who researches serial killers and studies pathological narcissism and parapsychology.

In the meantime, Peter meets with his family. Over dinner, he shares a repetitive dream in which he is reading a book with the characters "XES" on the cover. Later, one of the priests discovers that it is the Greek number "χεζ", which in its value 22 + 5 + 6, indicates that the incarnation of the devil will meet a man in the minute of his 33rd birthday.

Maya realizes Peter is the chosen personification of the devil. She confronts him with evidence such as his unique blood type, his lack of belief in pure evil, and the fact that his infant baptism was performed by a family member rather than religious clergy. Persuading Peter to participate in an exorcism, Maya approaches him to look for a pentagram under his bed and at the same time, hands him the tape on which Henry's exorcism was recorded. Peter plays the tape in his apartment, but it is silent. Instead, Henry's screams are heard in the neighbor's apartment, and the resident is later found to have killed herself.

Peter shares with his girlfriend, Claire, the pentagram after he discovers it hidden in the false ceiling of the apartment below hers. Instead, Claire pulls out a gun and threatens to shoot Maya, exclaiming that she is delusional and that Peter is being deceived by her. A struggle between both women ensues during which a shot is inadvertently fired, killing Claire.

In order to carry out the exorcism on Peter, they reach out to Father Lareaux. Since Henry's exorcism, Lareaux has become possessed, so an exorcism is carried out on him instead, killing him in the process. As Lareaux lays dying, he tells Peter and Maya to seek Peter's uncle, Father James, who is celebrating mass in a church with members of Peter's family. Peter shoots both his uncle and two other members of his family, before driving off with Maya in his car.

Peter stops his Land Rover under a blocked bridge and hands the gun to his passenger, Maya. At the moment the digital vehicle clock changes to 6:66 a.m., Peter transforms into the human incarnation of Satan and Maya shoots him dead.

== Cast ==
- Winona Ryder as Maya Larkin
- Ben Chaplin as Peter Kelson
- Sarah Wynter as Claire Van Owen
- Philip Baker Hall as Father James
- John Hurt as Father Lareaux
- W. Earl Brown as William Kelson
- Alfre Woodard as Dr. Allen
- Elias Koteas as John Townsend
- Brian Reddy as Father Frank Page
- John Beasley as Detective Mike Smythe
- John Diehl as Henry Birdson
- Brad Greenquist as George Viznik
- Anna Gunn as Sally Prescott
- Anna Berger as Mrs. Levotsky

== Production ==
The film was shot in 1998 on location in Los Angeles and New York City.

Writers Betsy Stahl and Pierce Gardner cited the writings of M. Scott Peck, such as People of the Lie, as an inspiration for their story.

== Release ==
Lost Souls was initially set for release in October 1999. However, due to a flood of supernatural apocalyptic-themed horror films such as End of Days and Stigmata (both released in 1999), the film's distributor, New Line Cinema, chose to delay its release. The second release date, February 2000, was also cancelled due to a conflict with the very popular Scream franchise. A final release date of October 2000 was finally decided upon, which also happened to be exactly the same day as the re-release of The Exorcist (1973).

=== Box office ===
The film opened at number three at the North American box office making USD$7,954,766 in its opening weekend. Lost Souls ultimately grossed $31.3 million worldwide, making it a box office bomb.

=== Critical response ===
The film was panned by critics, though the condemnation was somewhat tempered by praise for its photography and atmosphere. On Rotten Tomatoes, it has a rating of 8% based on 93 reviews, with the website's consensus stating: "Though Kaminski's film is visually stylish, Lost Souls is just another derivative entry in the Apocalypse genre, with lackluster direction, unengaging characters, and no scares." At Metacritic, which assigns a normalized rating to reviews, the film has an average weighted score of 16 out of 100, based on 29 critics, indicating "overwhelming dislike". Audiences polled by CinemaScore gave the film a rare grade of "F" on an A+ to F scale, making it one of two films released on October 13 to get the grade along with Dr. T & the Women.

Elvis Mitchell in The New York Times wrote: "There are some particularly fine visual details; it's the central story that's lacking ... After what is supposed to be a harrowing moment, Kelson says, 'I was surprised but I was never frightened.' That about sums up Lost Souls." Jonathan Rosenbaum in the Chicago Reader dismissed the film as "visually striking set pieces set loose in a void." Steven Rea wrote in The Philadelphia Inquirer, "Despite its spooky, color-desaturated visuals, guffaws, not screams, are more in order.

Carla Meyer wrote in the San Francisco Chronicle, "Even a badly executed horror movie can achieve cheesy greatness. This one, unfortunately, is too somber for that. It's artfully shot -- to be expected with Kaminski as director -- with everything bathed in green and golden light. The set designers should be commended for their fine choice in lamps -- from Tiffany to Deco, they're fabulous, even in the priests' quarters. But when the furniture stands out more than the story, the movie's a stinker." Roger Ebert wrote in his review, "Lost Souls possesses the art and craft of a good movie, but not the story. For a thriller about demonic possession and the birth of the antichrist, it's curiously flat. All through the movie, I found myself thinking about how well it was photographed. Not a good sign."

The critical review from Film4 wrote: "Concluding with an ending reminiscent of both The Game and Jacob's Ladder (though delivered with the panache of neither), Lost Souls is not worth seeking out."

== Home media ==
New Line Home Entertainment released Lost Souls on DVD in 2001. Scream Factory released the film for the first time on Blu-ray on September 19, 2023.
