= Feast of July =

- Promotional movie poster
- Directed by: Christopher Menaul
- Written by: Christopher Neame (from the novel by H. E. Bates)
- Produced by: Henry Herbert; Christopher Neame; Ismail Merchant (executive); Paul Bradley (executive)
- Starring: Embeth Davidtz; Tom Bell; Gemma Jones; James Purefoy; Greg Wise; Kenneth Anderson; Ben Chaplin
- Cinematography: Peter Sova
- Edited by: Chris Wimble
- Music by: Zbigniew Preisner
- Production companies: Touchstone Pictures; Merchant Ivory Productions
- Distributed by: Buena Vista Pictures Distribution
- Release date: October 13, 1995
- Running time: 116 minutes
- Countries: United Kingdom; United States
- Language: English
- Budget: $7.5 million
- Box office: $293,274

Feast of July is a 1995 neo noir crime film directed by Christopher Menaul and produced by Merchant Ivory Productions, based on the 1954 novel by H. E. Bates, starring Embeth Davidtz and Ben Chaplin.

== Plot ==
The movie opens with Isabella Ford (Embeth Davidtz) travelling alone from Selmouth to Addisford on foot, and in an increasingly pathetic state. In a deserted cabin on the way, she gives birth to a stillborn baby. She buries it and continues her journey. Arriving in Addisford late in the evening, she meets lamplighter Ben Wainwright (Tom Bell), and enquires after a man named Arch Wilson (Greg Wise). Ben does not know him, but seeing her plight, takes her to his house. He instructs his wife (Gemma Jones) to get Bella washed up, and introduces his three children, Matty (Kenneth Anderson), Con (Ben Chaplin) and Jedd (James Purefoy). Matty, the youngest, is a shoemaker, Jedd is a soldier, and Con does not have a profession, but helps out with family chores. Bella is unable to eat any food offered her, but bursts into tears, and faints when she stands up to go to bed.

After a restless night with Arch very much on her mind, Bella wakes up next morning, and from her window, sees Mr and Mrs. Wainwright seeing off Jedd, who is returning to the army. As Bella prepares to leave, Mrs. Wainwright enquires about her family and learns that Bella has nowhere to go. She tells her that she can stay, as long as she does her share of house work.

That evening, Bella takes a pair of shoes that she received as a present from Arch to Matty in order to alter them as they are too large. Matty tells her that it can't be done as they are "cheap Yankee" shoes, which comes as a surprise to Bella. Matty says he will make her a new pair. The next day, Bella leaves for Aylesburgh to fetch leather. Con secretly follows Bella and when confronted by her, asks her if she would like to come out with him sometime. Bella tells him that she has no mind to go out with anyone. Con asks her to forget what he said, and leaves.

One day, after Jedd's arrival, he and Bella go for a walk in the woods, and Jedd flirts with her. That evening, Jedd and Ben go to the pub, and later, Arch drops off a drunken Jedd and Ben at their house, but drives off before Bella sees him. Jedd continues to flirt will Bella, much to Con's annoyance. The next day, crop harvest begins and the entire family goes to work in the fields. During a break, Jedd insists that Bella is not comfortable and picks her up and carries her to a shadier spot, in spite of Bella's polite protests. Jedd also forcefully offers her water and Con, who can't take it anymore, suddenly attacks Jedd with a scythe. Jedd retaliates with a rake. Mrs. Wainwright separates them. That night, at a party for all the villagers, Bella dances with each of the brothers in turn. After dancing with Con, Bella asks him why he fought Jedd, and requests he watch his temper, as she does not want any troubles in the family which took her in.

The next day, as Bella sees Jedd off at the station, she finds Arch there. She follows him home, only to learn that he is married and has a child. She decides to leave Addisford, while Mrs. Wainwright agrees since she set her sons one against the other. When Con arrives home, he runs to the station and tries to persuade Bella to stay. Bella confesses that she had been with another man and tells about the baby. Con replies that he loves her and that her past does not matter. Bella returns home, but Mrs. Wainwright receives her coldly.

Con and Bella attend a party where she runs into Arch, and she accuses him of lying to her. At breakfast the next day, Con suddenly proposes to Bella in front of his parents, and Bella accepts. Con takes Bella boating on the river, but there they encounter Arch, who makes fun of them. When the bullying gets worse, Con, in a fit of rage, kills Arch with a stone, in spite of Bella's attempts to stop him.

Con and Bella flee Addisford. During the night they take refuge in a deserted house. Con is disgusted with himself and scared. Bella comforts him and professes her love for him, and they make love. The next day, they continue to Selmouth, en route for Dublin. In Selmouth, Con notices that Bella is acquainted with a lot of the men in town and he becomes suspicious of her. At one point, when he sees Bella talking to the captain of the boat, he has a vision of the captain and Bella kissing, laughing at him and him slapping Bella hard on the face. Following this, he tells Bella that he doesn't trust himself with her, and is going to turn himself in as he can't live with the guilt. He asks her to say goodbye. Bella protests violently, but nonetheless, he turns himself in.

On the day of Con's execution, when Bella comes to visit him, she runs into his family. Mrs. Wainwright tries to attack her; but at the end of the visit they are overcome with emotion and hug each other. Con is hanged as Bella is on the train from Addisford. In the closing scene, Bella is standing on the boat deck, on her way to Dublin. She touches her stomach and smiles slightly to herself, which suggests that she is pregnant with Con's child.

== Cast ==
- Embeth Davidtz as Bella Ford
- Tom Bell as Ben Wainwright
- Gemma Jones as Mrs. Wainwright
- James Purefoy as Jedd Wainwright
- Kenneth Anderson as Matty Wainwright
- Greg Wise as Arch Wilson
- Ben Chaplin as Con Wainwright
- David Neal as Mitchy Mitchell
- Julian Protheroe as Bowler-Hatted Man
- Mark Neal as Clerk at Shoe Factory
- Tim Preece as Preacher
- Daphne Neville as Mrs. Mitchell
- Charles De'Ath as Billy Swaine
- Colin Prockter as Man in Pub
- Richard Hope as Squire Wyman
- Kate Hamblyn as Harvest Girl
- Richard Hicks as Second Rowing Youth
- Arthur Kelly as Game Keeper
- Frederick Warder as Captain Rogers
- Colin Mayes as Seaman
- Tom Marshall as Prison Warder

== Production ==
Blists Hill Victorian Town and the Black Country Living Museum were used as filming locations. The coastal and sailing scenes towards the end of the story were filmed in Porlock Weir.

The film was scored by Zbigniew Preisner and the music subsequently released as a soundtrack album by Angel Records. The album consists of nine tracks by Preisner with two "Harvest Dances" containing music for the film by Rachel Portman.

== Reception ==
Feast of July received a mixed reception from critics. On Rotten Tomatoes, it holds a rating of 60% from 10 reviews.
