= Catherine Holman =

- Born: Sutton, Surrey, England, UK
- Occupation: Actress

Catherine Holman (born in Surrey) is an English actress. She trained at Italia Conti Academy of Theatre Arts in London.

She made her theatre début as Scout in To Kill a Mockingbird opposite Alan Dobie at the Mermaid Theatre. This was followed by the role of Flora in The Innocents at The Mill at Sonning, Laurie in Brighton Beach Memoirs at Library Theatre and Charlie Pringle in Postman Pat's Special Delivery.

Catherine played the role of Helen Keller opposite Jenny Seagrove in Bill Kenwright's Production of The Miracle Worker, a National Tour before transferring to the Comedy Theatre and then the Wyndham's Theatre, West End.

Other credits include the role of Rose in Dancelands at the Old Red Lion Theatre, Islington; Flora in The Innocents at the Haymarket Theatre in Basingstoke; Sarah in a film short by Sean Rogg All the King's Horses; Jackie in The Ghostbusters of East Finchley for BBC Television; Poppy in Agatha Christie's The Pale Horse for Anglia Television; Alice in Wilderness for Carlton Television; Becky in A Little Princess at Manchester's Library Theatre; Pony in Approaching Zanzibar at Southwark Playhouse; Charlotte in Tongue of a Bird at the Almeida Theatre and Alice in Alice's Adventures in Wonderland at Chester's Gateway Theatre.

Catherine's most recent credits include the role of Avril in Semi-Detached at Chichester Festival Theatre and Lucy Turner in Peak Practice (series 9 & 10) for Carlton Television.

== Theatre ==
Catherine Holman's theatre work includes:

Avril Hadfield in Semi-Detached, Chichester Festival Theatre (1999)
Charlotte in Tongue Of A Bird, Almeida Theatre (1997)
Pony in Approaching Zanzibar, Southwark Playhouse (1997)
Flora in The Innocents, Haymarket Theatre (1995)
Rose in Danceland, Old Red Lion Theatre (1994)
Helen Keller in The Miracle Worker, Comedy Theatre (1994)
Laurie in Brighton Beach Memoirs, Manchester Library Theatre (1991)
Flora in The Innocents, The Mill at Sonning (1990)
Scout in To Kill A Mockingbird, Mermaid Theatre (1989).

== Television ==
Year	Title	Role	Notes
1985-6	From the Top	Janis Koplowitz	12 episodes
1987	Drummonds	Alison	1 episode
1995	The Ghostbusters of East Finchley	Jackie	6 episodes
1996	Wilderness	Young Alice	2 episodes
1997	The Pale Horse	Poppy Tuckerton	TV movie
2000	Peak Practice	Lucy Turner	7 episodes
