= Jeffrey Archer: The Truth =

2002 British TV programme

- Written by: Guy Jenkin
- Directed by: Guy Jenkin
- Starring: Damian Lewis; Greta Scacchi; Polly Walker; Ben Miller; Emily Mortimer; Richard Wilson; Richard Griffiths; Steven Pacey; Geoffrey Beevers
- Country of origin: United Kingdom

Production
- Running time: 90 minutes

Original release
- Network: BBC
- Release: 1 December 2002

Jeffrey Archer: The Truth is a 2002 BBC satirical comedy drama on the life of Jeffrey Archer, with the title role played by Damian Lewis. Its duration was ninety minutes, and its premiere occurred on 1 December 2002. It was written and directed by Guy Jenkin.

== Selected cast ==
- Damian Lewis as Jeffrey Archer
- Greta Scacchi as Margaret Thatcher
- Polly Walker as Mary Archer
- Ben Miller as Roland Moxley-Nemesis
- Emily Mortimer as Diana, Princess of Wales
- Richard Wilson as Prince Philip, Duke of Edinburgh
- Richard Griffiths as Willie Whitelaw
- Steven Pacey as Tony Blair
- Geoffrey Beevers as Denis Thatcher
