= The Ghostbusters of East Finchley =

1995 British television comedy drama series

- Genre: Comedy-drama
- Written by: Tony Grounds
- Directed by: Jim Gillespie
- Starring: Paul Reynolds; Catherine Holman; Bill Paterson; Jan Francis; Ray Winstone
- Music by: John Lunn
- Country of origin: United Kingdom
- Original language: English
- No. of series: 1
- No. of episodes: 6

Production
- Producer: Andrée Molyneux
- Running time: 30 minutes
- Production company: BBC

Original release
- Network: BBC 2
- Release: 16 November – 21 December 1995

The Ghostbusters of East Finchley is a British comedy-drama series written by Tony Grounds, starring Paul Reynolds, Catherine Holman, Bill Paterson, Jan Francis and Ray Winstone. It was developed by BBC Television and ran for one series, a total of six episodes were produced and was shown on BBC2 from 16 November to 21 December 1995.

== Premise ==
The series focuses on a young misfit Kevin Pullen who lives on a council estate in East Finchley. He's a work-shy dreamer who becomes suspicious about his mother Grace's lecherous employer Thane, so he organises a surveillance operation by following him around town in order to find out more about his activities. His friend and neighbour Jackie works at the Inland Revenue and is intrigued by Kevin's efforts, so she encourages him to join her organisation and learn the ropes as a tax fraud investigator. The local tax office is run by the ambitious and shrewd Mr Small who uses unorthodox methods such as ghosting (going undercover) potential tax evaders in order to uncover their crimes. Kevin agrees to work at the Inland Revenue on condition that Jackie will use her skills in her trade to assist him with his investigations on Thane and find a way to prosecute him for his tax dodging offences.

== Background ==
Following on from his success with his offbeat comedy drama series Gone to the Dogs, Tony Grounds was approached by BBC producer Andree Molyneux about the idea for doing a serious drama series about tax evasion. Although initially apprehensive about the project, Grounds agreed to do the series on condition he was able to reformat it as a comedy. His concept for the series was for a burgeoning love story between Kevin and Jackie set within the everyday operations of a tax office, with an on-going subplot focussing on their investigations into Thane's financial dealings. When interviewed about the series by Lucy Vanoli from The Stage, Grounds noted "to me, if you look at the world, everything seems strange. Everyone seems mad except you and your family." He further elaborated that he wanted to do a series that was quirky and original and unlike anything else seen on television. He gave the series a surrealistic angle by including eccentric characters, dream sequences and bizarre set pieces such as the hole in the ceiling which Kevin and Jackie use to communicate from their respective bedrooms.

== Cast ==
- Paul Reynolds – Kevin Pullen
- Catherine Holman – Jackie
- Bill Paterson – Mr Small
- Jan Francis – Grace Pullen
- Ray Winstone – Thane
- Christopher Fulford – Frankie Pullen
- Jane Cox – Brenda
- Sheila Reid – Hilda
- Joe Melia – Stan
- Marc Warren – Butch
- Anthony Head – Terry
- Carol MacReady – Elizabeth
- Ace Bhatti – DI Cunliffe

== Episodes ==
No.	Title	Original release date
1	"Episode 1"	16 November 1995
Kevin spends his days spying on his mother Grace who works as a cleaner for the mysterious Thane, who is the landlord of the adjacent luxury apartment block. After seeing Thane touch his mother’s bum, he decides to shadow him by following Thane around town, in order to get his revenge. Meanwhile, Kevin's friend Jackie works at the Inland Revenue as a clerical assistant, when one day her employer Mr Small decides she should come out with him, doing some ‘ghostbusting’ on tax evaders out on the streets. A job opening for a new clerical assistant at the tax office opens up just as Kevin discovers that his dole money has been withdrawn since he’s refused all the jobs the council have offered him. Following a dream where he meets Mother Theresa and John Lennon, he feels inspired to rid society of all known bugs. He explains to this Jackie, and she responds by offering him the job opportunity. Although hesitant at first, he quickly warms to the idea when Jackie tells him that through working at the tax office, he would be able to find out more about Thane’s dodgy dealings.
2	"Episode 2"	23 November 1995
Now working for the Inland Revenue, Kevin covertly makes his way to work in order to avoid his family from knowing about his new position. At the tax office, after doing some research on Thane, Jackie discovers that he has never paid tax in his life, and has no national insurance number. Meanwhile Small is investigating the financial dealings of Abigail Paget who runs the Hotel Royale. He discovers that she has been falsely declaring low profits from her business, despite living a luxurious lifestyle. So he tasks Jackie to go undercover and get a job at the hotel as a chambermaid in order to find out more about her finances. After receiving a £20 tip from Paget, Jackie discovers that she logs all her transactions in a log book. Later, Jackie and Kevin find out that Thane has been declaring his apartment building in his late mother’s name and receiving money from six ‘tenants’ despite him being the sole resident of the building. They task Butch to track down their names on the computer database and they make a startling discovery about the so-called tenants.
3	"Episode 3"	30 November 1995
Small tasks Kevin with his first undercover assignment, working as a taxi driver for East Finchley Cars, a firm run by a pair of twin brothers Den and Ned Yorke whom they believe following a tip off from a neighbour, that they are using their business as a front, in order to hide their undeclared income. Kevin utilises the company car that he has been provided to follow Thane, whom is regularly seen travelling to a mysterious location. One weekend Kevin is volunteered by the Yorkes to act as their chauffeur whilst they enter a bank. Kevin is convinced that the brothers are actually bank robbers and he informs his boss. Small finds out they’re not bank robbers, and due to their former service in the household cavalry, they use their knowledge on horses to their advantage and routinely gamble at horse racing, often receiving sizeable winnings. Later on, Kevin and Jackie follow Thane, in order find out the location of his secret lockup.
4	"Episode 4"	7 December 1995
After catching them at his lockup, Thane begins to suspect that Kevin is trying find out more about his business dealings. Meanwhile, Small is intrigued about the case of Gleeson’s Independent Undertakers, who have been declaring dwindling profits each year, even-though the company director Mr Gleeson has been able to afford an upmarket property in Bishops Avenue despite claiming to only earn £9,000 per annum. Small assigns Kevin to work undercover as an Undertakers Assistant in order to find out more about Gleeson’s financial dealings. Kevin soon discovers that Gleeson has boosted his income through organising cremation and house clearance services. At a burial, Kevin spots Thane in the graveyard standing by his mother’s graveside; Kevin discovers that all the graves have the names of the fake tenants residing in his block of flats. That night, he breaks into Thane’s lockup and logs all the number plates on his collection of vehicles. He passes this information onto Jackie, who soon finds out that all the cars were reported stolen. In response to the break-in, Thane exacts his revenge on Kevin and his family, by getting two thugs to rob their flat and destroy his father Frankie’s alcoholic beverage delivery business. Kevin hatches a plan to steal a valuable item from Thane, that could lead them to uncovering the secret to his car laundering operation.
5	"Episode 5"	14 November 1995
After Kevin and Jackie manage to steal Thane’s secret key, he becomes apoplectic with rage and he violently grabs Grace by the throat, demanding to know its whereabouts. Meanwhile, Kevin decides to track down the owners of the stolen cars. He and Jackie interview one of the owners who informs them that when she advertised to sell off her car, a woman with a stutter phoned and told her to park the car down another street and leave the spare key in the exhaust, her car was soon stolen, presumably by Thane. Kevin begins to see a pattern and believes the mysterious woman with the stutter may be linked to Thane. Jackie's estranged father Terry returns from Spain, but the reasons for his unexpected visit aren't clear. Small gets Jackie and Kevin to work undercover as roller skating car windscreen washers after he notices a group of cleaners out one morning managed by a one legged beggar known as Psycho. They discover from one his workers that Psycho isn’t what he seems, and he's actually a wealthy man who earns his hidden capital from managing a group of door to door sales operatives selling products at hiked up prices. Whilst cleaning a windscreen, Kevin notices a Jaguar XJS parked nearby and places an advert for it, in order to spring a trap that Thane will fall for. Small is finally informed by Kevin and Jackie about their investigations into Thane, when they find themselves in hot water.
6	"Episode 6"	21 December 1995
The police apprehend Kevin, Jackie and Small when they discover the trio breaking into Thane's lockup. At the police station, DI Cunliffe whom is also overseeing an investigation into Thane's business dealings warns them to cease their inquiry, in response Kevin resigns from the tax office in disgust. Back at the flat, Terry offers Frankie a business proposition to help him courier expensive cars over to his property in Spain. Unbeknownst to Frankie, Terry happens to be Thane's business partner who sells on the luxury cars that Thane steals. Kevin has a dream where he encounters Mother Theresa again, where she tells him he must overcome his weakness and self doubt, she uses Alec Guinness in the guise of his character from The Bridge on the River Kwai, to illustrate this. Feeling inspired, Kevin rushes back to the tax office to retract his resignation and soon arranges a meeting with Jackie, Small and DI Cunliffe, where he informs that he believes Thane's mother is still alive and assists him with his business dealings. They get the police to exhume the grave of Thelma Thane where they find a body. Kevin disputes the evidence, despite the uncanny likeliness to Thelma. Kevin and Jackie inform Small that Thelma took out a life insurance policy of £200,000 to be paid on the event of her death which Thane demanded in cash, then a few weeks after her supposed passing, he purchased the luxury flats at an auction using the insurance money he received. Kevin deduces that the body is actually Thelma’s sister and that she has been murdered by her nephew as part of an insurance scam. Forensics later confirm this when they find out that the body belongs to Thelma’s sister Joyce. Kevin then hatches a plan with Jackie and Small to corner Thelma with a fake solicitor's letter and put an end to Thane's unscrupulous business activities.

== Reception ==
The series received a mixed response from journalists at the time of its transmission. Joe Steeples from the Sunday Mirror described the series as too quirky for its own good and was one to miss, while Jaci Stephen from the Daily Mirror, described the series as a very funny comedy, full of lovely, funny lines and characters; she particularly praised Holman and Paterson for their unlikely double act. Meanwhile, the surreal angle of the series, Melanie Henderson writing for the Aberdeen Evening Express, states was almost perverse and rather refreshing, but not exactly intriguing.

== Home media ==
To date, the series has not been commercially released on VHS or DVD.
