= Game On (British TV series) =

British TV sitcom

- Genre: Sitcom
- Created by: Andrew Davies; Bernadette Davis
- Directed by: John Stroud
- Starring: Samantha Janus; Matthew Cottle; Ben Chaplin; Neil Stuke
- Opening theme: "Where I Find My Heaven" by Gigolo Aunts
- Country of origin: United Kingdom
- Original language: English
- No. of series: 3
- No. of episodes: 18 (list of episodes)

Production
- Producers: Geoffrey Perkins; Sioned Wiliam
- Running time: 30 minutes
- Production company: Hat Trick Productions

Original release
- Network: BBC2
- Release: 27 February 1995 – 6 February 1998

Game On is a British sitcom which ran for three series on BBC2 from 27 February 1995 to 6 February 1998.

The central characters are three childhood friends from Herne Bay in Kent: laddish agoraphobe Matthew Malone (Ben Chaplin in the first series and Neil Stuke in the second and third), man-eater Amanda "Mandy" Wilkins (Samantha Janus), and wimpish Martin Henson (Matthew Cottle). In their twenties, the trio move into and share a flat in Battersea, south-west London, which Matthew bought with his inheritance, and the series follows their lives as flatmates.

Created and written by Andrew Davies and Bernadette Davis, and produced by Hat Trick Productions for the BBC, Game On was aimed at twenty-somethings, the same age group as the principal cast of the show.

== Production ==
It was directed by John Stroud, produced by Sioned Wiliam and the BBC Television Head of Comedy Geoffrey Perkins, and executive produced by Denise O'Donohue on behalf of Hat Trick Productions for the BBC.

After a successful first series, Ben Chaplin left the cast unexpectedly after receiving an offer of a film role in Hollywood on the back of his performance in the series. He was replaced for series 2 and 3 by Neil Stuke. (The change of actor was indirectly acknowledged in Stuke's first episode, when the other characters complained about the recasting of a main character in Roseanne and expressed their dislike for TV shows which did this). The first two series were written by Andrew Davies and Bernadette Davis, while Davis wrote the final series alone.

The show's theme tune was "Where I Find My Heaven" by the Gigolo Aunts. The single reached number 29 in the UK singles chart in May 1995, when the series debuted. Among other music included was "Dogs of Lust" by The The, "Nowhere" by Therapy?, "From Despair to Where" by Manic Street Preachers, "Girls & Boys" by Blur, "God! Show Me Magic" by Super Furry Animals, "The View From Here" by Dubstar and Oasis.

A fourth series was considered. Bernadette Davis voiced her desire to focus the next series on the development of Matthew, who due to his flat-bound existence, she began to find increasingly hard to write for; the addition of a "radicalist" new gay or lesbian housemate was also part of her suggestions to add a new element of interest to the series. However, despite a continuity announcer stating over the closing credits of the final episode in a 1999 repeat that the series would return the following year, only one further repeated episode was broadcast the following year, and a fourth series never emerged.

Second and third series cast, from left: Martin Henson (Matthew Cottle), Mandy Wilkins (Samantha Womack née Janus), and Matthew Malone (Neil Stuke).

== Reception ==
The Digital Fix noted that viewing figures for the show were highest during its first series with Ben Chaplin as the lead actor, and the audience for the subsequent series declined sharply when he was replaced by Neil Stuke. The British Comedy Guide noted in its review of Game On that the series was polarizing due to some controversy over some of the politically incorrect dialogue, situations and gags, but also that the series had high viewing figures, building up an even bigger following after its cancellation.

=== Awards ===
Game On was nominated for Best Comedy (Programme or Series) at the 1997 BAFTAs, along with Absolutely Fabulous and Father Ted; the category was won by Only Fools and Horses.

== DVD releases ==
All three series of the show are available on DVD. The first series DVD is the only one with any special features, which include Chaplin's best moments as Matthew Malone from the first series and character photo galleries.

DVD Title	Disc #	Year	Episode #	DVD release dates
DVD Title	Disc #	Year	Episode #	Region 2
Complete Series 1	1	1995	6	17 September 2001
Complete Series 2	1	1996	6	23 August 2004
Complete Series 3	1	1998	6	23 August 2004
Complete Series 1–3	3	1995–1998	18	23 August 2004
