= The Bill series 10 =

Season of British television series

The Bill
- Series 10
- No. of episodes: 156

Release
- Original network: ITV
- Original release: 4 January – 30 December 1994

Series chronology
- ← Previous; Series 9 Next → Series 11

The tenth series of The Bill, a British television drama, consists of 156 episodes, broadcast between 4 January and 30 December 1994. On 3 October 2012, The Bill Series 10 Part 1 and 2 and The Bill Series 10 Part 3 and 4 DVD sets were released in Australia.

Audio commentaries have been recorded for the episodes "Bin-Men", "Blackout", "Instant Response" and "Taken on Trust", released exclusively on The Bill Podcast Patreon channel.

All the major storylines and characters featured in 1994 are reviewed by TV historian Edward Kellett in the book Reaching A Verdict: Reviewing The Bill (1993-1994).

== Cast changes ==
=== Arrivals ===
- DI Sally Johnson (Episode 2–)
- DC Rod Skase (Episode 4–)
- PC Adam Bostock (Episode 7–)
- DS Chris Deakin (Episode 91–)

=== Departures ===
- PC Adam Bostock – Unexplained
- DS Jo Morgan – Transferred to the Regional Crime Squad

== Episodes ==
No. in series	Title	Directed by	Written by	Episode notes	Original release date
1	"Games"	Andrew Higgs	Len Collin	David Bamber and June Page guest star	4 January 1994
Loxton and Monroe investigate the disappearance of a nine-year-old boy who is into computers. Note: A shot in the title sequence showing the then-departed DI Haines was replaced by one featuring Ch Insp Cato and WPC Page, featured only once prior to then, and it was replaced permanently by a shot of DI Johnson with DS Pearce in the following episode.
2	"Second Sight"	David Attwood	Elizabeth-Ann Wheal	First regular appearance of DI Sally Johnson; Michael Byrne guest stars	6 January 1994
As DI Sally Johnson takes charge of CID, the team hunt a gang of event robbers who case targets through the local paper. Can they track them doing the same?
3	"Darkness Before Dawn"	Nick Laughland	Sebastian Secker Walker	Sophie Okonedo, Douglas Henshall and David Quilter guest star	7 January 1994
Boyden and Page find the bodies of a young mother and her baby at the bottom of a tower block.
4	"He Who Waits"	Douglas MacKinnon	Neil Clarke	First appearance of DC Rod Skase; Sally George guest stars	11 January 1994
New DC Rod Skase assists Pearce and an AMIP team when an aggravated burglary turns fatal. Garfield feels he has a point to prove as his thoughts are disregarded.
5	"Mix and Match"	Charles Beeson	Chris Ould	—	13 January 1994
Cato gatecrashes Peace and Steele's operation to track a group of stolen vehicles with the help of insurer's trackers.
6	"Dealer Wins"	Charles Beeson	Duncan Gould	—	14 January 1994
Johnson and Pearce are summoned as witnesses to a Family Court to testify against two dealers.
7	"No Job For An Amateur"	Rittaa Leena Lynn	Candy Denman	First appearance of PC Adam Bostock; Julie Hesmondhalgh guest stars	18 January 1994
Ackland and new PC Adam Bostock investigate reports of an intruder at a nurses' home.
8	"Judge and Jury"	Bill Pryde	James Stevenson	Susan Fleetwood and David Horovitch guest star	20 January 1994
A solicitor in custody is stunned when Stamp and Ackland arrest his wife for petrol theft.
9	"The Mourning After"	Chris Lovett	Mark Holloway	Jo Stone-Fewings and Dido Miles guest star	21 January 1994
Morgan investigates a fatal stabbing on the common, but the victim's blind mother is adamant it is not her son.
10	"Just Say No"	Jan Sargent	Nigel Baldwin	Tim Preece guest stars	25 January 1994
Conway arrests a girl for kicking his car, but it's a deliberate ploy so she can give information in the case of a drug dealer's murder.
11	"Mud Sticks"	Peter Cattaneo	Isabelle Grey	—	27 January 1994
An anti-prostitution activist is suspected when a punter is stabbed, but is a subsequent assault on his wife revenge or coincidence?
12	"One Bad Turn"	Laurence Moody	Anthony Valentine	Nicholas Bailey guest stars	29 January 1994
Following residents' complaints, Cato instigates a clampdown on prostitution.
13	"Faith in the System"	Bill Pryde	Matthew Wingett	Russell Boulter guest stars	1 February 1994
Carver refuses to cover when he witnesses Barton Street DC John Boulton assaulting a suspect. Notes: Russell Boulter, as the newly-promoted DS Boulton, would join the cast in 1995.
14	"Keeping Mum"	Michael Simpson	Lizzie Mickery	Kevin Doyle and Annie Hulley guest star	3 February 1994
When Greig and Croft arrive at a house to arrest a 15-year-old boy, they find his mother has been beaten up.
15	"Double Vision"	Chris Clough	Neil Clark	Fanny Carby guest stars	4 February 1994
Pearce lands Johnson in hot water when he tries to nick a result off Loxton.
16	"No Access"	Riitta Leena Lynn	Isabelle Grey	David Neilson and Rene Zagger guest star	8 February 1994
Morgan investigates the possibility of a young boy's disappearance being related to two recent sexual assaults on minors. Notes: Rene Zagger would join the cast as PC Nick Klein in 1999.
17	"Ways and Means"	Jan Sargent	Jane Woodrow	Paul Jerricho and Perry Fenwick guest star	10 February 1994
Datta fears reprisals when a domestic abuser walks from court, while Quinnan and Marshall investigate a woman who has been shoplifting repeatedly.
18	"Cutting It"	Brian Parker	Michael Jenner	—	11 February 1994
Cato investigates when a probationer on B relief accuses her sergeant of sexual harassment.
19	"Secrets"	Douglas MacKinnon	Neil McKay	Dicken Ashworth and David Haig guest star	15 February 1994
Boyden is skeptical when a repeat hoax caller claims she has witnessed a convicted paedophile abducting a teenage girl.
20	"Bin-Men"	Ian White	Roger Davenport	Lloyd McGuire guest stars	17 February 1994
Loxton and McCann hunt an absconded prisoner admitted to hospital after crashing a stolen bike, while Stamp and Page try to make sense of a bizarre fight.
21	"Ducking and Diving"	Chris Clough	Barry Purchese	Alan Ford and Debbie Linden guest star	18 February 1994
McCann is hospitalised attending a robbery with Jarvis, and an illegal fighting circuit may prove key to nailing the suspects.
22	"Gone Away"	Ian White	Isabelle Grey	Daniela Denby-Ashe guest stars	22 February 1994
Page tries to help a hard-working student who has gone off the rails and into dealing in the absence of her mother.
23	"Dead Men Don't Drive Cars"	John Bruce	Rob Gittins	Lizzie Mickery guest stars	24 February 1994
Uniform investigate why a man would use two dead men's identities for driving tests.
24	"Saturday Night's All Right"	John Bruce	Len Collin	Charles De'Ath guest stars	25 February 1994
Monroe and his officers are called to a rent party where the organiser has been seriously assaulted.
25	"Ranks and Files"	Derek Lister	Edward Canfor-Dumas	Nicholas Donnelly guest stars	1 March 1994
Johnson clashes with Woods while trying to solve an outstanding assault investigated by CID alum Roach.
26	"Business as Usual"	Indra Bhose	Philip Palmer	—	3 March 1994
A clothing store gets broken into.
27	"Root of All Evil"	Indra Bhose	Joanne Maguire	Paul Putner and Roy Heather guest star	4 March 1994
Johnson and Woods investigate the scene of an arson attack.
28	"Man to Man"	Derek Lister	Trevor Wadlow	Steven Hartley guest stars	8 March 1994
A man reported missing by his wife is found shot dead. Notes: Steven Hartley would join the cast as Supt Tom Chandler in 2000.
29	"Menace"	Brian Parker	Tom Needham	Michael Keating guest stars	10 March 1994
Could a series of vicious hoax calls and repeated burglaries at the homes of two young women be linked?
30	"Killjoys"	Laurence Moody	Gregory Evans	—	11 March 1994
Uniform hunt a pirate radio station's organisers due interference with police radio transmissions.
31	"One of Them"	Nick Laughland	Chris Lang	David Quilter and John McArdle guest star	15 March 1994
A supposedly respectable outreach worker is assaulted, but could he be responsible for another crime?
32	"Day of Reckoning"	Diana Patrick	Julian Spilsbury	Zienia Merton, Connor McIntyre and Harry Van Gorkum guest star	17 March 1994
A notorious ex-con gives evidence against a former associate in a drugs case, but his subsequent disappearance could spell an end to the operation.
33	"Sleeping with the Fishes"	Laurence Moody	Julian Jones	Geoffrey McGivern guest stars	18 March 1994
When a boat is found adrift in the Thames, fears rise that somebody could’ve fallen overboard.
34	"Fair Exchange"	Diana Patrick	Chris Lang	—	22 March 1994
CID investigate a suspected arson attack on the home of a known villain.
35	"Last Rights"	Nick Laughland	Candy Denman	Philip McGough guest stars	24 March 1994
Monroe has to oversee the complicated case of a terminally ill woman attempting suicide.
36	"Mean Streak"	Michael Offer	James Stevenson	—	25 March 1994
Johnson is embarrassed when a 4-man undercover op fails to nail a gang of robbers.
37	"Pig in the Middle"	Carol Wilks	Jonathan Myerson	Idris Elba and Jennie Stoller guest star	29 March 1994
Carver and Woods have a trial blown out when a witness falsely identifies a dealer in a rivalry with her boyfriend.
38	"House Arrest"	Carol Wilks	Barry Simner	Georgina Cates guest stars	31 March 1994
A former villain tries to help Meadows solve a robbery where the culprit is his daughter's boyfriend.
39	"Clubbing Together"	Brian Farnham	Sebastian Secker Walker	George Irving guest stars	1 April 1994
Pearce is suspicious when friends of a known thug claim he was assaulted by a club bouncer.
40	"Pals"	Aisling Walsh	Mark Holloway	David Gwillim guest stars	5 April 1994
Jarvis is grilled by CIB over an assault during a rugby match, and he is torn about identifying the real culprit – an Inspector from another nick.
41	"Sold Out"	Michael Offer	Stephen C. Handley	Shirin Taylor guest stars	7 April 1994
Greig determines to nail a villain after tips from an informant fail twice in the same week.
42	"Last Orders"	Chris Lovett	Michael Jenner	—	8 April 1994
Meadows oversees the hunt for a gang who robbed a brewery and hospitalised a security guard in the process.
43	"All the Comforts of Home"	Aisling Walsh	Lyndon Mallet	Brian Miller, Sorcha Cusack and Philip Glenister guest star	12 April 1994
A woman tells Loxton and Ackland her missing daughter is being abused by her lover, with Marshall having already located the girl.
44	"Wild Justice"	Graeme Harper	Nigel Baldwin	Sarah Alexander and Colin Spaull guest star	14 April 1994
Greig and Croft are perplexed when a burglary suspect positively identified at the scene despite having a rock-solid alibi.
45	"Give Away"	Brian Farnham	Len Collin	—	15 April 1994
Morgan and Lines clash with a vicious thug, while Hollis and Boyden are on the trail of stolen koi carp.
46	"Nowhere to Run"	Chris Lovett	Simon Frith	Charlotte Bellamy and John Moreno guest star	19 April 1994
Datta hunts a domestic abuser also being sought by Quinnan and Greig for robbery.
47	"Final Straw"	Gwennan Sage	Tom Needham	—	21 April 1994
Greig comes under fire when a burglary suspect he questions attempts suicide.
48	"Bodyguard of Lies"	Gwennan Sage	Elizabeth-Anne Wheal	Ron Cook and David Quilter guest star	22 April 1994
Johnson angers Ackland by jeopardising an informant, so Monroe steps in to recover an operation.
49	"Friends Like That"	Roger Gartland	Tony Etchells	—	26 April 1994
Quinnan finds himself harassed by a violent evictee who claims he knows him.
50	"Disclosures"	Graeme Harper	Carolyn Sally Jones	Ian Redford, Dominic Jephcott and Patrick Godfrey guest star	28 April 1994
A late witness threatens to jeopardise Greig and Ackland's court case.
51	"Big Eagle Day"	A J Quinn	Terry Hodgkinson	Danny Webb and Patrick Murray guest star	29 April 1994
Uniform find a pile of cash at the home of a convicted robber after breaking up a party.
52	"Bottleneck"	David Richards	J. C. Wilsher	Ginny Holder guest stars	3 May 1994
Johnson hunts an escaped prisoner. A proposed policy change by the Met leaves Sun Hill's top brass unnerved.
53	"Honour and Obey"	Roger Gartland	Lizzie Mickery	—	5 May 1994
Croft is paired with the brutish Skase for the first time and finds herself resenting his methods.
54	"Hot Off the Press"	A J Quinn	Edwin Pearce	Clive Merrison and David Hargreaves guest star	6 May 1994
Cato investigates racist leaflets being distributed across the borough – including in schools.
55	"Killing Time"	Jeremy Silberston	Mark Holloway	Thomas Craig and Lesley Nicol guest star	10 May 1994
A burglary, armed robbery and shooting near miss all link to a teenager who has gone off the rails.
56	"Butter Wouldn't Melt"	David Richards	Neil Clarke	Pete Lee-Wilson and Joanna Monro guest stars	12 May 1994
Cato targets a comic book shop owner who has become a modern-day Fagin with his teenage customers.
57	"All Things Nice"	David Attwood	Ron Rose	—	13 May 1994
A match day drugs raid on a pub looks set to be compromised when a gang of rival fans enter the fray.
58	"No Way to Treat a Lady"	Ian White	Scott Cherry	—	17 May 1994
Carver hunts a thug who assaulted Page during a domestic. Cato comes under fire as an off the record remark is made public.
59	"The Price"	Jeremy Silberston	Roy MacGregor	—	19 May 1994
The key witness to an attempted murder vanishes.
60	"Old Scores"	Ian White	David Hoskins	Trevor Byfield guest stars	20 May 1994
Boyden is investigated by MS15 for allegedly taking back-handers from a corrupt security firm.
61	"Branded"	David Attwood	Barry Simner	—	24 May 1994
Meadows and Woods investigate a prison assault on a convicted sex offender, while Morgan and Lines investigate arson attacks on the cars of his cellmates' partners.
62	"Good Friends"	June Howson	Marianne Colbran	Alan Westaway guest stars	26 May 1994
A seemingly straightforward burglary becomes complicated when one of Johnson's informants is given a false alibi. Notes: Alan Westaway would join the cast as PC Nick Slater in 1996.
63	"RTA"	Douglas Mackinnon	Philip Palmer	—	27 May 1994
Monroe suspects a fatal RTA was deliberate.
64	"No Marks"	June Howson	Robert Jones	Frank Mills guest stars	31 May 1994
A young boy is found wandering in possession of a stolen watch linked to a recent armed robbery.
65	"Sweetness and Light"	David Attwood	Ron Rose	Kenneth Farrington guest stars	2 June 1994
A gang of teenagers cause a nuisance on an estate, and a boy on a scrambling bike is almost decapitated.
66	"Hey Diddle Diddle"	Nick Laughland	Gerry Huxham	Rebecca Lacey and David Meyer guest star	3 June 1994
Meadows receives the tape of a deathbed confession to murder. Could others be involved?
67	"Funny Money"	Graham Dixon	Duncan Gould	—	7 June 1994
Lines and Meadows hunt two counterfeiters trying to fly under the radar with fake fivers.
68	"Till Death Do Us Part"	Chris Clough	Harry Duffin	Colin Buchanan guest stars	9 June 1994
Loxton and Quinnan are called to a canal where a known vagrant claims to have witnessed a man being shoved in.
69	"All Along the Watchtower"	Sue Dunderdale	Stephen C. Handley	Michele Austin guest stars	10 June 1994
Uniform come under fire as a persistent young offender runs over a 6-year-old girl in a stolen car.
70	"Snowblind"	Douglas Mackinnon	Steve Griffiths	—	14 June 1994
False information from a snout leaves Skase red in the face.
71	"Lesson to be Learned"	Andrew Higgs	Roy Mitchell	Sally Rogers, Louis Mahoney and Dominic Guard guest star	16 June 1994
A young black student is accused of a savage attack on a schoolmaster, but Lines thinks that the teachers have something to hide.
72	"Dear John"	Brian Farnham	Lyndon Mallet	—	17 June 1994
Meadows takes over Monroe's investigation to a fatal tower block fall when a knife wound is found on the victim's body.
73	"Within Limits"	Christopher Hodson	Brian B. Thompson	—	21 June 1994
Boyden investigates an assault and helps a former lover deal with her violent husband. Garfield thinks the sergeant may be up to his old tricks again.
74	"Tails You Lose"	Christopher Hodson	Maxwell Young	—	23 June 1994
Skase's informant needs protection, but he is compromised when he uncovers the full extent of her criminal activities.
75	"Gate Fever"	Jim Goddard	Isabelle Grey	David Gwillim and George Sewell guest star	24 June 1994
Cryer tries to keep a torn family together when the man who murdered their daughter is released from jail.
76	"The Road Not Taken"	Jim Goddard	Ron Rose	—	28 June 1994
Page finds her loyalties tested when she arrests an old school friend in a drugs raid.
77	"Fallen Angel"	Graham Dixon	Rob Gittins	Barrie Gosney and Hywel Simons guest star	30 June 1994
Woods investigates the activities of a cowboy builder, but near-identical statements from the victims leave him suspicious. Notes: Hywel Simons would join the cast as Sgt Craig Gilmore in 2001.
78	"A Touch of Braid"	Frank Smith	Edwin Pearce	Ged Simmons guest stars	1 July 1994
Uniform are left to face the fallout when a teenage boy falls off a balcony trying to escape a CID raid. Notes: Ged Simmons would join the cast as DI Alex Cullen in 2000.
79	"Masquerade"	Frank Smith	Julian Spilsbury	Rio Fanning guest stars	5 July 1994
A magician performing at one of Conway's community meetings is suspected of burgling pensioners.
80	"Good Days"	Michael Simpson	Peter J. Hammond	Liz Fraser, Renu Setna and Frank Jarvis guest star	7 July 1994
Lines and Woods attempt to solve the mysterious disappearance of an armed robber, but his mistress proves less than cooperative.
81	"Banned"	Sam Miller	Michael Baker	Trevor Cooper guest stars	8 July 1994
Johnson's methods are called into question when she removes an aggressive solicitor's clerk from an interview with a robbery suspect.
82	"Parental Guidance"	Chris Lovett	Richard Stoneman	—	12 July 1994
McCann is assisted by a lad who wants to join the Met in the search for a robbery suspect, while Lines gets some disappointing news about his son's behaviour.
83	"Settling the Score"	Baz Taylor	Tom Needham	—	14 July 1994
Quinnan chances his arm in order to get an arrest. Carver realises that one of his informants has set up a suspect to clear the way for an affair with his wife.
84	"High Drivers"	Sam Miller	Nigel Baldwin	Charlie Condou guest stars	15 July 1994
Monroe is called to a fatal traffic accident, then deals with a case of mistaken identity.
85	"Personal Space"	Moira Armstrong	Carolyn Sally Jones	WPC Suzi Croft is promoted to WDC; Ashley Jensen and Peter-Hugo Daly guest star	19 July 1994
Croft and Woods interview a man suspected of abducting a girl.
86	"Public Spirit"	Sue Dunderdale	Simon Frith	Paul Copley guest stars	21 July 1994
A businessman seems unconcerned after one of his employees is fatally injured in a street fight over drug-dealing territories.
87	"Dirty Laundry"	Moira Armstrong	Elizabeth-Anne Wheal	—	22 July 1994
Johnson tries to stop a drugs war from escalating after a crack addict is shot.
88	"Paying the Price"	John Bruce	Robert Jones	—	26 July 1994
Conway clips the wing-mirror of a car and finds himself listening to a man's confession to an attempted armed robbery.
89	"Best Interests"	Brian Farnham	James Stevenson	Robert Gwilym guest stars	28 July 1994
Morgan has to choose between heart and head when trying to track down a boy who has been abducted by his father.
90	"Easy Prey"	Baz Taylor	Mark Holloway	—	29 July 1994
Meadows suspects an overdose was actually murder, while Stamp and Jarvis hunt two lads who vandalised the area car.
91	"Unfinished Business"	Jeremy Silberston	David Hoskins	First appearance of DS Chris Deakin	2 August 1994
Johnson attempts to track down a violent escaped prisoner. The arrival of new DS Chris Deakin is delayed when he is called into court.
92	"War of Nerves"	Danny Hiller	Edwin Pearce	Billy McColl guest stars	4 August 1994
Datta is unnerved when Cato hauls the relief over the coals after complaining about cases being dumped on the DVU.
93	"Legacy"	Laurence Moody	Chris Ould	Hubert Rees, Shaun Williamson and Eamon Boland guest star	5 August 1994
Johnson is suspicious when Meadows makes Deakin the handler for an old informant of her predecessor Burnside.
94	"Death and Taxes"	David Yates	Jonathan Myerson	John Duttine guest stars	9 August 1994
Ackland and Quinnan investigate a break-in at a pharmacy. Cryer investigates extortion among the young homeless.
95	"In Too Deep"	Nicholas Mallett	Roy MacGregor	—	11 August 1994
Meadows and Deakin investigate the fatal shooting of a young windscreen washer and uncover a link to a local drug dealer.
96	"You Belong to Me"	Jeremy Silberston	Marianne Colbran	Dearbhla Molloy guest stars	12 August 1994
Datta and Cryer investigate the disappearance of a seventeen-year-old girl, but have to contend with her feuding brother in-law and sister.
97	"Looking for Mr Right"	Danny Hiller	Barry Simner	—	16 August 1994
Morgan and Woods investigate a serious assault and are led to a case of kidnap and extortion.
98	"Skinning Cats"	Nicholas Mallett	Duncan Gould	—	18 August 1994
Meadows and Conway fall out over the handling of an informant. Quinnan hunts a vanload of stolen meat.
99	"Full Contact"	David Yates	Steve Griffiths	Adrienne Posta guest stars	19 August 1994
Meadows is annoyed when a lorry carrying cigarettes is highjacked. Stamp and Ackland intervene in a fight in a pub car park between two thieves.
100	"Partners"	John Bruce	Simon Moss	Gerry Cowper guest stars	23 August 1994
Deakin and Croft investigate a jewel store armed robbery after a suspect is caught fleeing by Hollis and Loxton.
101	"On the Latch"	Gill Wilkinson	Michael Jenner	Shaun Dingwall guest stars	25 August 1994
Meadows and Morgan investigate what appears to be the violent death of an old soldier in a drugs-related burglary.
102	"Wall of Silence"	Gill Wilkinson	David Hoskins	Michael Melia guest stars	26 August 1994
Stamp and Ackland's bizarre case of a bedroom game gone wrong leads to a much more serious crime.
103	"Business Opportunities"	Dominic Allan	Isabelle Grey	John Rolfe guest stars	30 August 1994
Uniform are given the runaround by a cowboy builder robbing clients and stealing supplies for his business.
104	"A Little Learning"	Chris Lovett	Michael Jenner	Anna Wilson-Jones guest stars	1 September 1994
Deakin and Johnson investigate an assault on a teacher, but the suspect counter-alleges harassment by the school's headmaster.
105	"Right Way, Wrong Way"	Simon Meyers	Nigel Baldwin	Larrington Walker and Pik-Sen Lim guest star	2 September 1994
Steele and McCann investigate a hit-and-run incident as violence between the West Indian and Chinese communities, leading to tension between Cato and Conway.
106	"Instant Response"	Nicholas Laughland	Joanne Maguire	Final appearance of PC Adam Bostock	6 September 1994
When a villain is sent down, his angry teenage son seeks revenge by drawing the Sun Hill team into an aggressive pursuit across Canley.
107	"Washback"	Chris Clough	A. Valentine	—	8 September 1994
A sawn-off shotgun found in a house fire puts Lines and Johnson onto the trail of crack dealer Lee Ruddick.
108	"Kickback"	Laurence Moody	A. Valentine	David Gwillim guest stars	9 September 1994
When Lee Ruddick dies at St Hugh's following the drugs raid, Johnson is left facing a CIB enquiry.
109	"Birthright"	Aisling Walsh	Peter J. Hammond	Deborah Manship guest stars	13 September 1994
Ackland and Datta are drawn into the past when a couple are pestered by a young woman claiming to be a long-lost daughter.
110	"Threats and Promises"	Michael Simpson	Gregory Evans	—	15 September 1994
A wall of silence obstructs CID when uniform attend a stabbing at a club owned by a family of villains.
111	"Inside"	Gwennan Sage	Mark Holloway	—	16 September 1994
Jarvis is faced with the task of negotiating when a woman is held hostage in her flat by an obsessive lover.
112	"Back on the Chain Gang"	Laura Sims	Stephen C. Handley	—	20 September 1994
An old villain seeking out Morgan blows a CID OBBO, so she determines to make amends by acting on info about a planned robbery.
113	"Out in the Cold"	Gwennan Sage	David G. McDonagh	Jacqueline Defferary guest stars	22 September 1994
Jarvis, Loxton, Page and Cato deal with a trio of squatters and a violent landlord.
114	"Living Legend"	Brian Farnham	Helen Leadbeater	Georgina Hale, Derek Martin, Johnnie Wade, Neil Stuke and John Gill guest star	23 September 1994
Meadows is left red in the face when drugs are missing after CID bust a deal.
115	"Runners and Riders"	June Howson	Michael Jenner	Victoria Alcock guest stars	27 September 1994
Meadows is worried that a vicious attack was meted out in revenge for the conviction of a loan shark.
116	"Down and Out"	Laura Sims	Simon Frith	Ewen Bremner guest stars	29 September 1994
Boyden crosses swords with Johnson as she gets heavy-handed with a mentally ill prisoner.
117	"Inquest"	Brian Farnham	Margaret Phelan	TBA	30 September 1994
Several Sun Hill officers face a coroner's enquiry over an elderly drug dealer who died in custody. Guest cast: Lolita Chakrabarti, Margery Mason, Ian McNeice, Georgina Hale, Janet Lees Price and David Neal; Notes: Lolita Chakrabarti would join the cast as WPC Jamila Blake in 1996.
118	"Grey Matter"	Aisling Walsh	Edward Canfor-Dumas	Bruce Byron and Madhav Sharma guest star	4 October 1994
Johnson investigates a suspected racially-motivated attack.
119	"Blackout"	Simon Meyers	Roger Davenport	Malcolm Terris, Mark Heap, Sean Caffrey and Peter Benson guest star	6 October 1994
Woods and Lines have multiple suspects for a hit and run – but none of them have access to cars.
120	"The Cold Consumer"	Douglas Mackinnon	Terry Hodgkinson	—	7 October 1994
Page deals with the sudden death of an unidentified man in the bathroom of a high class prostitute.
121	"Saving Face"	Dominic Allan	Scott Cherry	Stacey Tendeter guest stars	11 October 1994
Carver's last-minute tip-off on armed robbery precedes a series of errors that jeopardise the OBBO.
122	"Silent Partner"	Indra Bhose	Isabelle Grey	Peter Copley guest stars	13 October 1994
Pearce and Croft's investigation into a burglary at a block of flats for the elderly leads them to a suspected bogus charity.
123	"One Born Every Minute"	Jeremy Silberston	Tom Needham	Campbell Morrison guest stars	14 October 1994
A rape allegation sends Deakin into the murky world of pimps and prostitutes.
124	"Backlash"	Chris Clough	A. Valentine	Hour-long 10th anniversary special; Danny John-Jules and Allan Corduner guest star	18 October 1994
Johnson stands trial for manslaughter of Lee Ruddick amidst allegations of a police cover-up. Subsequent repeats of this episode were split into two half-hour episodes – the first titled as "Backlash" and the other "R.I.P".
125	"Taken on Trust"	Tony Virgo	Julian Spilsbury	—	20 October 1994
An unexploded WWII bomb is discovered on the banks of the river; a group of squatters jeopardise Monroe's efforts to evacuate the area.
126	"Bridgework"	Michael Simpson	Elizabeth-Anne Wheal	David Lonsdale guest stars	21 October 1994
A raid precedes a heated info session at Sun Hill by Area Drugs and a reformed addict about fighting the war on drugs.
127	"Land of the Blind"	John Bruce	Sebastian Secker-Walker	Claire Benedict and Russell Brand guest star	25 October 1994
Deakin and Meadows are prosecuting a teenager for assault but McCann thinks he is innocent.
128	"Indecent Exposure"	John Bruce	Elizabeth-Anne Wheal	Nadia Sawalha guest stars	27 October 1994
Pearce and Croft fall out over the arrest of a drugs dealer with MS.
129	"Pass the Parcel"	Alan Bell	Chris Ould	—	28 October 1994
Brownlow frets when Hicks summons him to Area to talk about his future, while Greig contends with a time wasting burglary suspect.
130	"Cheap at Half the Price"	Christopher Hodson	Chris Lang	—	1 November 1994
Deakin goes undercover as a professional hitman and is asked to kill the wife of a failing businessman.
131	"The Sixth Age"	June Howson	Ron Rose	Helen Fraser and Diana Coupland guest stars	3 November 1994
Loxton and Quinnan are drawn into a world of romance, intrigue and violent affections when called to attend an incident at a local tea dance.
132	"Pipped at the Post"	Christopher Hodson	Robert Jones	—	4 November 1994
With the transfer of Ch Supt Brownlow to Area, there is a vacancy at Sun Hill; Conway, Cato and Meadows all vie for the job.
133	"Mischief"	Gill Wilkinson	Peter J. Hammond	—	8 November 1994
Cryer and Garfield are called to the scene of a suicide.
134	"Taking Stock"	Tony Virgo	Marianne Colbran	Final regular appearance of WDS Jo Morgan; Sarah Parish and Maureen O'Farrell guest star	10 November 1994
Morgan investigates a suspected racial assault with links to a possible protection racket while awaiting word of a transfer to the Regional Crime Squad.
135	"The Melting Pot"	Sam Miller	Christopher Russell	Ch Insp Derek Conway is promoted to A/Supt; Oscar James guest stars	11 November 1994
Conway has a hectic first day in his new job as he deals with the aftermath of a senior officers' night out, absentee inspectors and burglars that need babysitting.
136	"No Name, No Number"	Indra Bhose	Jonathan Myerson	Forbes Collins and Anthony Jackson guest star	15 November 1994
Stamp and Boyden come under suspicion as Meadows suspects a Sun Hill officer is involved with witness intimidation.
137	"Make Believe"	David Attwood	Michael Jenner	—	17 November 1994
Monroe and Cryer investigate a school crossing guard who has been giving expensive toys to young children.
138	"Sleeping Dogs"	Audrey Cooke	Maxwell Young	—	18 November 1994
A young girl reports a rape a year after it happened. Can Johnson and Pearce dig up enough evidence to make the charge stick?
139	"Beg, Borrow or Steal"	Gill Wilkinson	Edwin Pearce	John Abineri guest stars	22 November 1994
Cato's anti-vagrancy initiative draws Page's attention to a loan shark exploiting the homeless.
140	"Work Experience"	Chris Lovett	Barry Simner	Richard Mylan guest stars	24 November 1994
Carver goes undercover as a mechanic to investigate a garage owner's plans to be getaway driver on an armed robbery.
141	"Down a Blind Alley"	Alan Bell	Roy MacGregor	David Quilter guest stars	25 November 1994
Cato is accused of assaulting a man who mugged him.
142	"Creating a Market"	Douglas Mackinnon	Candy Denman	—	29 November 1994
Deakin sets up pawn shop in an attempt to trap mobile phone thieves, while Greig investigates the theft of an office's computers.
143	"Fly on the Wall"	Audrey Cooke	Rob Gittins	Catherine Tate guest stars	1 December 1994
Pearce and Croft investigate when rivalry between gangs of fly-posters escalates to assault and an arson attack.
144	"King of the Hill"	Simon Meyers	Chris Ould	Joe Absolom guest stars	2 December 1994
Boyden gets injured chasing a teenage assault suspect through a derelict factory, but will the boy help him out?
145	"Fathers and Sons"	Brian Parker	Gregory Evans	Richard Beale and Bruce Alexander guest star	6 December 1994
Pearce and Croft investigate an assault, but the victim's father seems reluctant to help.
146	"A Feeling for the Job"	Keith Boak	Tom Needham	Freddie Earlle guest stars	8 December 1994
Cryer suspects the worst when a man's wife goes missing.
147	"Closing Time"	Chris Lovett	Mark Holloway	—	9 December 1994
Cato's methods unnerve Cryer as he tries to evict a widowed pub landlady.
148	"Blood Pressure"	David Attwood	Richard Stoneman	Angela Lonsdale, Jack Smethurst and Martin Hancock guest star	13 December 1994
An assault on a Jehovah's Witness is complicated by his mother's refusal to let him have a blood transfusion.
149	"Appropriate Adults"	Martin Hutchings	Barry Simner	—	15 December 1994
Cato launches a raid on a brothel, while Carver investigates the fall from a landing by one of the pimp's other girls.
150	"Throw the Key Away"	Sam Miller	Neil Clarke	—	16 December 1994
Deakin manipulates a chaotic afternoon in custody to conduct an illegal interview – putting Monroe at odds with Johnson.
151	"An Unconventional Approach"	Frank W. Smith	Dom Shaw	Ann Davies guest stars	20 December 1994
Ackland and Loxton get caught up in violent competition between rival bailiffs.
152	"Fall Guy"	Simon Meyers	James Stevenson	—	22 December 1994
Croft is horrified when Skase goes over the top to get a result.
153	"Stuffed"	Christopher Hodson	Mark Holloway	Ray Ashcroft guest stars	23 December 1994
Cryer is surprised when two kids report their stepdad has stolen Christmas presents from their mum's boss. Stamp and Cato try pranking one another at the Christmas party. Notes: Ray Ashcroft would join the cast as DS Geoff Daly in 1996.
154	"Dearly Departed"	Alan Bell	David G. McDonagh	Ian Puleston-Davies and Ralph Watson guest star	27 December 1994
A body is found in a club owner's burnt out car. Greig investigates the theft of a corpse at an undertaker's.
155	"Returning the Call"	Frank W. Smith	Richard Stoneman	Jake Wood guest stars	29 December 1994
Hollis finds CID less than helpful as he investigates a threatening voicemail message, even after he makes a link to a series of burglaries.
156	"Licensed to Kill"	Jan Sargent	Roy MacGregor	Pooky Quesnel guest stars	30 December 1994
Hollis assists a woman who is the victim of obsession. McCann is disappointed when a young driver with a fake ID he failed to notice kills a man in a hit and run.
