= Deborah Manship =

Welsh actress

Deborah Manship (born 25 September 1953) is a Welsh actress, best known for her roles in the television drama series Angels (as Sister Valerie Price) and The District Nurse (as Nesta Mogg).

She later appeared in the Doctor Who serial The Greatest Show in the Galaxy and The Bill 1994.
