= Two Weeks (2006 film) =

- Directed by: Steve Stockman
- Written by: Steve Stockman
- Produced by: John Marias; Steve Stockman
- Starring: Sally Field; Ben Chaplin
- Cinematography: Stephen Kazmierski
- Edited by: Debra Chiate
- Music by: Heitor Pereira
- Production company: Metro-Goldwyn-Mayer Pictures
- Distributed by: MGM Distribution Co.
- Release date: October 20, 2006
- Running time: 102 minutes
- Country: United States
- Language: English
- Budget: $2.4 million
- Box office: $47,986

Two Weeks is a 2006 American comedy-drama film written and directed by Steve Stockman and starring Sally Field. Ensemble cast also includes Ben Chaplin, Julianne Nicholson, Tom Cavanagh, Glenn Howerton and Jenny O'Hara.

The film was released by Metro-Goldwyn-Mayer Pictures in theaters on March 2, 2007, in select theaters, and was released on DVD on September 18, 2007. However, it was screened at the Hamptons International Film Festival on October 20, 2006, and is often cited as a 2006 film. Two Weeks received mostly negative reviews from critics, although Field's performance was praised. At the 7th AARP Movies for Grownups Awards, Field received nomination for Best Actress.

== Premise ==
Four siblings return home to their mother's house, in North Carolina, for what they think are the last few days of her life. Suddenly, this unexpected family reunion extends uncomfortably as she hangs on, and they find themselves trapped together for two weeks, forced to face her death and also their connection with each other.

== Cast ==
- Sally Field as Anita Bergman
- Ben Chaplin as Keith Bergman
- Thomas Cavanagh as Barry Bergman
- Julianne Nicholson as Emily Bergman
- Glenn Howerton as Matthew Bergman
- Clea DuVall as Katrina
- James Murtaugh as Jim Cranston
- Michael Hyatt as Carol
- Susan Misner as Sherry
- Jenny O'Hara as Julia

== Reception ==
Rotten Tomatoes gives the film a 19% approval rating based on 26 reviews, with an average rating of 4.4/10. The site's critics consensus reads: "Sally Field gives it her all, but this excessively maudlin family drama feels like it takes Two Weeks to finish."
