= Trust (British TV series) =

- Genre: Legal drama
- Created by: Simon Block
- Written by: Simon Block; Andrew Rattenbury
- Directed by: John Strickland; Philippa Langdale; Nicholas Laughland
- Starring: Robson Green; Sarah Parish; Neil Stuke; Chiwetel Ejiofor; Eva Birthistle; Ian McShane
- Country of origin: United Kingdom
- Original language: English
- No. of series: 1
- No. of episodes: 6

Production
- Executive producers: Gareth Neame; Gub Neal; Jonathan Young
- Producer: Jake Lushington
- Cinematography: Laurence Jones
- Running time: 50 minutes
- Production company: Box TV

Original release
- Network: BBC One
- Release: 9 January – 13 February 2003

Trust is a six-part British television legal drama, produced, written and created by Simon Block, and broadcast on BBC One from 9 January until 13 February 2003. The series starred Robson Green, with Sarah Parish, Neil Stuke, Chiwetel Ejiofor, Eva Birthistle and Ian McShane. Only one series was made before the programme was decommissioned by the BBC. Trust received mixed reviews in the British press, but received better critical acclaim when it was rebroadcast on BBC America in 2004. The series was produced by Box TV Productions.

== Plot ==
Trust revolves around a corporate law team led by partner Stephen Bradley (Robson Green), a maverick lawyer who often finds sense in apparently senseless argument. In each episode, the team are presented with corporate clients who require the services of the law firm, often in the handling of critical deals including takeovers, mergers and acquisitions and dissolutions. The series also deals with issues relating to long city working hours, corporate competition, drug abuse in the work place and corporate social responsibility, or the lack of it.

The series is set in the City of London and makes full use of the city's iconic buildings as visual references. Cooper Fozard's offices are portrayed using two separate buildings for exterior shots — Thomas More Square in Wapping is portrayed as Cooper Fozard's office building, while roof shots, which often provide breaks within episode stories to focus on series spanning themes, are filmed at 1 Poultry. Other locations have included The Bank of England and St Paul's Cathedral. The series makes constant use of aerial photographs of the city, with Tower 42, The Gherkin (while still under construction), Shoreditch & Hoxton, Lloyd's of London and The Royal Exchange frequently being utilised to set the scene. The title sequence features shots of the City from Waterloo Bridge, and the title banner is displayed over an ultra-wide angle shot of the Aviva building and 122 Leadenhall Street in Undershaft.

== Cast ==
- Robson Green as Stephen Bradley; a maverick partner and team leader of Cooper-Fozard
- Sarah Parish as Annie Naylor; lawyer, aspiring partner, and a member of Stephen's team
- Neil Stuke as Martin Greig; a talented, openly gay lawyer on Stephen's team
- Chiwetel Ejiofor as Ashley Carter; a talented junior lawyer who often works apart from the team
- Eva Birthistle as Maria Acklam; a trainee lawyer on Stephen's team
- Ian McShane as Alan Cooper-Fozard; the enigmatic senior partner, known more often as The PG
- Nick Sidi as Sammy Samuelson
- Rosie Day as Emma Naylor
- Dugald Bruce Lockhart as Dougie Baker
- Julie Saunders as Serene Green
- Sara Houghton as Melissa Chang

== Episodes ==
No.	Title	Directed by	Written by	Original release date	Viewers (millions)
1	"Black Heart"	John Strickland	Simon Block	9 January 2003	6.23
Stephen Bradley's life isn't going well. He hasn't been home for 3 days and his wife is ready to kick him out. And at the firm, the director of finance is investigating his expense account records. The sale of a business he has spent 4 months working on is stalled because one of a pair of brothers won't sign the deal. Ashley is sent to do a pitch for a business, but then he has to do it himself, and so the deal falls through. At the last minute, Maria saves the deal, but at the end of the day Stephen is still at the office.
2	"Closed Door"	John Strickland	Simon Block	16 January 2003	N/A
Stephen is trying to close the sale of a travel business, but the seller is stalling and he needs to find out why. Martin and Annie represent a record label that wants to keep the members of a pop band from having relationships that cause the group's CD sales to drop. Ashley goes for drinks with the band and finds its easy to be led astray. Stephen's team is worried about his being audited, until they learn why Ruth is doing it. Meanwhile, Stephen's wife doesn't want to talk to him so she sends his father-in-law to mediate. Stephen finds comfort with Maria, who gives him a kiss.
3	"Knife Edge"	John Strickland	Simon Block	23 January 2003	N/A
The day starts off with Maria packing her stuff to put some distance between herself and Stephen, who is meeting a client and wondering where she is. Stephen's client is an oil company buying another company in order to improve its environmental credentials. Martin thinks that the newly-installed CCTV cameras have been watching him, and wants to get rid of them. Stephen is being sued by a client who says that Euros were transposed for Pounds in a contract. Maria discovers some behind-the-scenes dealings that shed new light on the deal Stephen is trying to put together.
4	"Spilt Milk"	Philippa Langdale	Andrew Rattenbury	30 January 2003	N/A
Stephen is battling to get a group of fashion designers to settle their dispute out of court. He persuades Annie to deal with a magazine owner who won't compromise on remaking a controversial teen magazine for the US market. Meanwhile, Martin is assigned to be the chaperone for Bring Your Child to Work Day. And Ashley takes over the account of a large pharmaceutical company, but is suspicious of their new anti-cancer drug.
5	"Knoughts and Crosses"	Philippa Langdale	Simon Block	6 February 2003	N/A
On the evening of the annual summer party, Martin is trying to close a deal in which the bank has advanced the deadline, but he has to deal with an overbearing young client who has more money than sense. When Ashley discovers that there's a defect in the product his client is developing, he gets offered a bribe to ignore it. Annie discovers she is on the short list to become a partner, but had promised her husband to put his career first by working fewer hours. Then she discovers that while she's been spending the long hours at work, he's been having an affair.
6	"D-Day"	Nicholas Laughland	Simon Block	13 February 2003	N/A
It's D-Day for a number of people. Stephen's wife has asked for a divorce and he is meeting with her and her lawyer to start proceedings. Annie has a partner interview but so does Martin, who was short-listed after another candidate withdrew. And Ashley has been stalling Devalier but he can't stall for any longer. Stephen and Ashley meet Devalier and then have a secret meeting with one of the Devalier people. Cooper-Fozard are sitting on a can of worms – but is the PG involved? Annie doesn't make partner and the bottom is starting to fall out her life.
