= Neil Stuke =

British actor

- Born: Neil Robert Stuke; 22 February 1966 (age 60)
- Occupation: Actor
- Years active: 1991–present

Neil Robert Stuke (/stuːk/ STOOK;) is an English actor best known for his role of Matthew in the TV sitcom Game On and for playing Billy Lamb in the BBC legal drama Silk.

== Career ==
Stuke played Matthew in the second and third series of Game On, replacing Ben Chaplin. He also played the role of senior clerk Billy Lamb in the BBC television series Silk. His television career also includes Between the Lines, Trust, Reggie Perrin, At Home with the Braithwaites, Monday Monday, Office Gossip, Bedtime, A Touch of Frost, The Catherine Tate Show and playing an alcoholic footballer/policeman in a 1997 episode of Pie in the Sky.

He played Hal in a 1997 Radio 3 production of Loot by Orton, repeated in 2017.

In 2006, he guest-starred in The Bill; his character (James Tennant) was involved in the storyline of missing child Amy Tennant.

In January 2020, he appeared in an episode of Doctor Who, alongside Jodie Whittaker, Jo Martin, and The Judoon.

== Personal life ==
In August 2014, Stuke was one of 200 public figures who were signatories to a letter to The Guardian opposing Scottish independence in the run-up to September's referendum on that issue.

== Filmography ==
Television
Year	TV Show	Role	Notes
1991	The Bill	Thomas Jeffries	Episode: "Empire Building"
1991	Drop the Dead Donkey	Star Batter	Episode: "Baseball"
1993	Agatha Christie's Poirot	Peter Baker	Episode: "The Case of the Missing Will"
1993	The Bill	Dave Slater	Episode: "By Hook or by Crook"
1993	Between the Lines	Det. Con. Green	Episode: "Crack Up"
1994	The Bill	Lewis	Episodes: "Living Legend" and "Inquest"
1994	Heartbeat	Snakey	Episode: "Treading Carefully"
1995	The Chief	Bobby Dean	1 episode
1995	Cardiac Arrest	Director	Episode: "The Critical Hour"
1995	Resort to Murder	Skins	4 episodes
1996	The Bill	Alex Easby	Episode: "No Assistance Required"
1996	A Touch of Frost	Det. Sgt. Nash	Episode: "The Things We Do for Love"
1996	Karaoke	Peter (Movie)	4 episodes
1996	Cold Lazarus	Peter (Movie)	1 episode
1996	Out of the Blue	Tommy Defty	1 episode
1996–98	Game On	Matthew	Series 2 & 3 (12 episodes)
1997	Pie in the Sky	Kirk Flowerbridge	Episode: "Return Match"
1997	Light Lunch	Himself (guest)	Episode: "We're Game On"
1998	Seesaw	Jon	3 episodes
1998	Silent Witness	Andy Fox	Episode: "Divided Loyalties: Part 1 & Part 2"
1998	Casualty	Tony	Episode: "Eye Spy"
1998	Grafters	Paul	7 episodes
1998	Drop the Dead Donkey	Wes Jasper	2 episodes
2000	At Home with the Braithwaites	Keith Kershaw	Pilot episode
2000	The Sins	Carl Rogers	7 episodes
2001	Office Gossip	Simon	6 episodes
2002	Murder in Mind	Colin Edwardson	Episode: "Victim"
2003	Trust	Martin Greig	6 episodes
2003	Murphy's Law	Carl	Episode: "Reunion"
2003	Madre Teresa	Kline	TV film
2003	Bedtime	John	3 episodes
2005	The Afternoon Play	Steve Passmore	Episode: "The Hitch"
2005	Faith	Nigel	TV film
2005	Twenty Thousand Streets Under the Sky	Andy	2 episodes
2005	Murder in Suburbia	Steve	Episode: "Old Dogs"
2005	Chopratown	Det. Insp. Nigel Caro	TV film
2005	Life and Death in Rome	Himself (narrator)	Documentary (unknown episodes)
2006	The Virgin Queen	Francis Bacon	2 episodes
2006	Soundproof	Chris Groves	TV film
2006–07	The Bill	James Tennant	18 episodes
2007	Kingdom	Damien	1 episode
2009	Midsomer Murders	Glen Jarvis	Episode: "Secrets and Spies"
2009	Monday Monday	Max	7 episodes
2009	Saturday Kitchen	Himself (guest)	1 episode (16 May 2009)
2009–10	Reggie Perrin	Chris	Series 1 & 2 (10 episodes)
2010	Agatha Christie's Marple	Dr. Haydock	Episode: "The Mirror Crack'd from Side to Side"
2010	New Tricks	Duncan Miller	Episode: "Dark Chocolate"
2010	The Slammer	Agent Alec Baldwin	Episode: "Gov on the Run"
2010	Celebrity Masterchef	Himself (contestant)	7 episodes
2010	Jane Goodall: Beauty and the Beasts	Himself (narrator)	Documentary
2010–11	BBC Breakfast	Himself (guest)	2 episodes (12 August 2010 & 28 February 2011)
2011	Death in Paradise	Lucas Talbot	1 episode
2011	Fern	Himself (special guest)	1 episode
2011–14	Silk	Billy Lamb	18 episodes
2011–14	The Wright Stuff	Himself (panelist)	26 episodes
2012	Fathers Day	(unknown)	TV film
2012	One Night	Kenny	Mini-series (3 episodes)
2012	Celebrity Antiques Road Trip	Himself	1 episode
2013	Lewis	Professor Andrew Crane	Episode: "Down among the Fearful"
2014	Plebs	Cornelius	2 episodes
2015	The Interceptor	Reid	1 episode
2015–2017	Doctor Foster	Chris Parks	Recurring role; 6 episodes
2016	Suspects	Mo Jones	4 episodes
2016	Silent Witness	Det. Insp. Laurence Cooke	Episode: "In Plain Sight" (2 parts)
2016	Paranoid	Michael Niles	
2017	Porters	Hutch	1 episode
2018	Silent Witness	Chief Insp. Laurence Cooke	Episode: "Family" (2 parts)
2019	Tom Clancy's Jack Ryan	Jeremy Bright	Episode: "Dressed to Kill"
2020	Doctor Who	Lee	Episode: "Fugitive of the Judoon"
2020	Midsomer Murders	Curtis Ferabbee	Episode: "Send in the Clowns"
2023	Hijack	Neil Walsh	Episode: 4-7

Film
Year	Film	Role	Notes
1993	Century	Felix	
1994	Borderland	Soldier	Short film
1995	Suckers	Dave	Short film
1996	Masculine Mescaline	Mike	Short film
1998	Shark Hunt	(unknown)	Uncredited
1998	Sliding Doors	Defensive bloke	
1998	If Only...	Freddy	
1999	Let the Good Times Roll	Mike	Short film
1999	Dead Bolt Dead	The Assassin	
1999	Mad Cows	Desk Sergeant	
2000	The Suicide Club	Captain May	
2000	Circus	Roscoe	
2000	The Wedding Tackle	Salty	
2000	Christie Malry's Own Double Entry	Headlam	
2001	The Dark	Apprentice (voice)	
2004	School for Seduction	Craig	
2005	Out on a Limb	Simon	
2008	Le Petit Mort	Promoter	Short film by Jason Merrells
2016	The Comedian's Guide to Survival	Adam	
2022	I Used to Be Famous	Dennis	
