= John Stroud (director) =

British television director and producer

- Born: 27 January 1955; Gillingham, Kent, England
- Died: 15 August 2009 (aged 54)
- Education: Caius College, Cambridge
- Occupations: Director, Producer

John Steven Rule Stroud (27 January 1955 – 15 August 2009), was a British television director and producer, who contributed to popular UK television comedy programmes over three decades.

== Early life ==
John Stroud was born in 1955 in Gillingham, Kent. He was the son of Heather Lovesey and James Stroud. He attended (and became head boy at) Dover College, and went on Tonbridge School on a scholarship; it was there he first met Vikram Jayanti. During his time reading English at Cambridge, he was a member of the Footlights. Amongst his peers there were comedians Griff Rhys Jones, Rory McGrath, Jimmy Mulville, and author Douglas Adams.

== Career ==
While he embarked in a researching role at Trans Atlantic Film, in 1978 he took up a role as a trainee director for Thames Television. In 1982, he directed seven episodes of Educating Marmalade. After later pursuing a freelance career, he worked on several comedy shows commissioned by Channel 4, including Who Dares Wins, and Spitting Image. He went on to direct the first series of independent production company Hat Trick's first project, Chelmsford 123.

In 1990 Stroud directed three episodes of Roland Rivron's pioneering spoof fly-on-the-wall documentary series, Set Of Six. The following year, he directed comedians Frank Skinner and Jenny Eclair in Packet of Three.

Other sitcoms that he had contributed to include So Haunt Me, KYTV, Harry Enfield and Chums, Game On, Kiss Me Kate, and Chambers. In 1996, Stroud teamed with Marcus Mortimer to form their own production company, Big Bear Films. Stroud and Mortimer had worked on Comic Relief together. Their principle project was My Hero, a comedy Stroud also directed, for the BBC. Vikram Jayanti collaborated with Stroud to produce The Hairy Bikers' Cookbook.

== Personal life and death ==
Stroud and his wife, Lesley had two children, Scarlett and Finlay. He died of brain cancer at the age of 54.

== Filmography ==
- Who Dares Wins (1983-1988)
- Spitting Image (1984-1996)
- Game On (1995-1998)
- Kiss Me Kate (1998-2000)
- My Hero (2000-2006)
- The Hairy Bikers' Cookbook (2006-).
