= Andrew Davies (writer) =

Welsh screenwriter and novelist (born 1936)

Andrew Davies FRSL
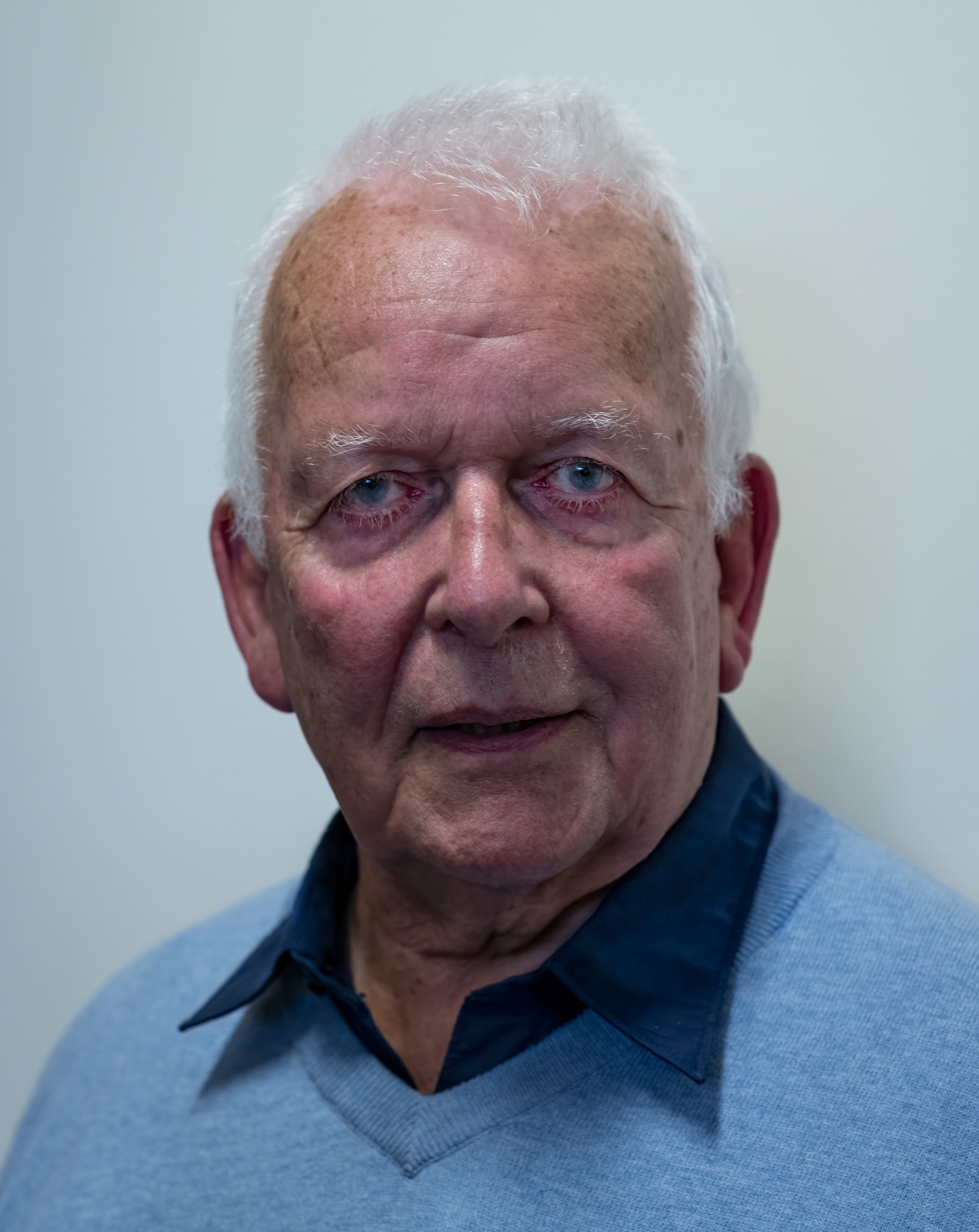
- Davies in 2019
- Born: Andrew Wynford Davies; 20 September 1936 (age 90); Rhiwbina, Cardiff, Wales
- Education: University College London (BA)
- Occupations: Writer (TV and print)
- Spouse: Diana Huntley (m. 1960; died 2023)
- Writing career
- Period: c. 1964–present (as a writer)
- Genres: Audio and screenplays, novels
- Notable works: The Signalman (1976); To Serve Them All My Days (1980); A Very Peculiar Practice (1986); House of Cards (1990); Middlemarch (1994); Pride and Prejudice (1995); Bleak House (2005); Mr Selfridge (2013); War & Peace (2016)
- Notable awards: Guardian Prize; 1979; BAFTA Fellow; 2002

Andrew Wynford Davies (/ˈdeɪvɪs/; born 20 September 1936) is a Welsh screenwriter and novelist. He is best known for his television adaptations of The Signalman (1976), To Serve Them All My Days (1980–1981), House of Cards (1990), Middlemarch (1994), Pride and Prejudice (1995), Bleak House (2005), Mr Selfridge (2013–2016), War & Peace (2016) and Les Misérables (2018–2019), and his original series A Very Peculiar Practice (1986–1988). He was elected a Fellow of the Royal Society of Literature in 1996 and awarded the BAFTA Fellowship in 2002.

== Early life ==
Davies was born in Rhiwbina, Cardiff, Wales. He attended Whitchurch Grammar School in Cardiff and then University College London, where he received a BA degree in English in 1957.

== Academic career ==
Davies took a teaching position at St Clement Danes Grammar School in London, where he was on the teaching staff from 1958 to 1961. He held a similar post at Woodberry Down Comprehensive School in Hackney, London, from 1961 to 1963. Following that, he was a lecturer in English at Coventry College of Education (which merged with the University of Warwick in 1978 to become the Faculty of Educational Studies and later the Warwick Institute of Education). He left his academic career to become a full-time writer in 1987.

== Writer ==
In 1960, Davies contributed material to the BBC Home Service's Monday Night at Home strand, along with Harold Pinter and Ivor Cutler. Davies wrote his first play for radio in 1964 and many more later. His first television play, Who's Going to Take Me On?, was broadcast in 1967 as part of BBC1's The Wednesday Play strand. His early plays were written as a sideline to his work in education, many of them appearing in anthology series such as Thirty-Minute Theatre, Play for Today and Centre Stage. One of his London stage plays, Rose, was performed on Broadway in 1981, with Glenda Jackson and Jessica Tandy.

Davies is now best known for his adaptations for television of classic works of literature, including of books by Charles Dickens, Jane Austen, William Makepeace Thackeray and George Eliot. Davies adapted the Dickens short story The Signalman (1976) and his first serial adaptation of a work of fiction was To Serve Them All My Days (1980), from the novel by R. F. Delderfield. Davies later adapted Pride and Prejudice (1995), Vanity Fair (1998), Bleak House (2005) and Sense and Sensibility (2008). He wrote the screenplay for the BBC production of Middlemarch (1994) and a planned film of the same name was once announced for 2011 release. The popularity of his adaptation of Michael Dobbs's political thriller House of Cards (for which Davies won his first Emmy Award for Outstanding Writing for a Miniseries) was a significant influence in Dobbs's decision to write two sequels, which Davies also adapted for television.

For BBC2, Davies wrote A Very Peculiar Practice (1986–1988), a comedy-drama series set on a university campus which drew upon his career in higher education. With Bernadette Davis, he co-created the sitcom Game On and co-wrote the first two series, broadcast in 1995 and 1996. In film, he has collaborated on the screenplays for the first two Bridget Jones films, based on Helen Fielding's novels.

Davies is a prolific writer for children. The first of his novels was Conrad's War, published by Blackie in 1978. Davies won the annual Guardian Children's Fiction Prize, which is judged by a panel of British children's writers and recognises the best book by an author who has not yet won it. He has written Alfonso Bonzo (book and television series) and the adventures of Marmalade Atkins (television series and numerous books). He also wrote the stories Dark Towers and Badger Girl for BBC TV's Look and Read programmes for schools audiences.

2008 saw the release of his adaptations of the 1999 novel Affinity by Sarah Waters, Evelyn Waugh's Brideshead Revisited (a film), and Charles Dickens' Little Dorrit (for the BBC). Little Dorrit won seven of eleven Emmy nominations and earned Davies his second Emmy for Outstanding Writing for a Miniseries.

Davies' proposed adaptations of Dombey and Son, one of Dickens' lesser-read works and Anthony Trollope's Palliser novels were scrapped by the BBC in late 2009, following a move away from "bonnet dramas".

ITV was looking to recreate its period drama success with Downton Abbey with a new series Mr Selfridge, written by Davies and starring Jeremy Piven. An initial ten-part series first aired on 6 January 2013 and it ran for four series, concluding in 2016.

Davies' six-part adaptation of Leo Tolstoy's War & Peace was broadcast on BBC One in January and February 2016. Following its success, the BBC announced in July 2016 that it would be followed up with a six-part adaptation of Victor Hugo's Les Misérables to be scripted by Davies. In May 2017, it was announced that BBC would adapt Vikram Seth's magnum opus A Suitable Boy into an eight-part series to be scripted by Davies.

In May 2018, he announced at the Hay Festival that he is adapting John Updike's 1960 novel Rabbit, Run for television.

== Personal life ==
In 1960, Davies married Diana Huntley; the couple have a son and daughter. Huntley died in 2023. In a 2025 interview with The New York Times, Davies said he was still adjusting to life without her. He lives in Kenilworth, Warwickshire.

== Filmography ==
=== Television series and serials ===
- Eleanor Marx (1977)
- The Legend of King Arthur (1979)
- To Serve Them All My Days (1980–1981)
- Dark Towers (Look and Read, 1981)
- Educating Marmalade (1982)
- Diana (1984)
- Badger Girl (Look and Read, 1984)
- Danger: Marmalade at Work (1984)
- A Very Peculiar Practice (1986–1988)
- Mother Love (1989)
- House of Cards (1990)
- The Old Devils (1992)
- Anglo-Saxon Attitudes (1992)
- The Boot Street Band (1993–1994)
- To Play the King (1993)
- Middlemarch (1994)
- Game On (with Bernadette Davis, 1995–1998)
- Pride and Prejudice (1995)
- The Final Cut (1995)
- Wilderness (with Bernadette Davis, 1996)
- The Fortunes and Misfortunes of Moll Flanders (1996)
- Bill's New Frock (Book Box, 1998)
- Vanity Fair (1998)
- Wives and Daughters (1999)
- Take a Girl Like You (2000)
- The Way We Live Now (2001)
- Daniel Deronda (2002)
- Doctor Zhivago (2002)
- Tipping the Velvet (2002)
- He Knew He Was Right (2004)
- Bleak House (2005)
- The Line of Beauty (2006)
- The Diary of a Nobody (2007)
- Fanny Hill (2007)
- Sense and Sensibility (2008)
- Little Dorrit (2008)
- South Riding (2011)
- Mr Selfridge (2013–2016)
- Quirke (2014)
- War & Peace (2016)
- Les Misérables (2018–2019)
- Sanditon (2019)
- A Suitable Boy (2020)

=== Television plays ===
- Who's Going to Take Me On? (The Wednesday Play, 1965)
- Is That Your Body, Boy? (Thirty-Minute Theatre, 1970)
- No Good Unless It Hurts (Sporting Scenes, 1973)
- The Water Maiden (Bedtime Stories, 1974)
- Grace (Centre Play, 1975)
- The Imp of the Perverse (Centre Play, 1975)
- A Martyr to the System (BBC2 Playhouse, 1976)
- The Signalman (A Ghost Story for Christmas, 1976)
- Velvet Glove (1977)
- Fearless Frank (BBC2 Play of the Week, 1978)
- Renoir My Father (BBC2 Play of the Week, 1978)
- After the Gold Rush (Scene, 1980)
- Bavarian Night (Play for Today, 1981)
- Marmalade Atkins in Space (Theatre Box, 1981)
- Heartattack Hotel (1983)
- Baby I Love You (Scene, 1985)
- Pythons on the Mountain (Summer Season, 1985)
- Time After Time (Screen Two, 1986)
- Inappropriate Behaviour (Screen Two, 1987)
- Lucky Sunil (Screen Two, 1988)
- A Private Life (Screen Two, 1989)
- Ball Trap on the Cote Sauvage (Screen One, 1989)
- Filipina Dreamgirls (Screen One, 1991)
- A Very Polish Practice (Screen One, 1992)
- Anna Lee (1993)
- Harnessing Peacocks (1993)
- A Few Short Journeys of the Heart (Stages, 1994)
- Emma (1996)
- Getting Hurt (Obsessions, 1998)
- A Rather English Marriage (1998)
- Othello (2001)
- Boudica (2003)
- Falling (2005)
- The Chatterley Affair (2006)
- Northanger Abbey (The Jane Austen Season, 2007)
- A Room with a View (2007)
- Affinity (2008)
- Sleep with Me (2009)
- A Poet in New York (2014)

=== Feature film ===
- Consuming Passions (1988)
- Circle of Friends (1995)
- The Tailor of Panama (2001)
- Bridget Jones's Diary (2001)
- Bridget Jones: The Edge of Reason (2004)
- Brideshead Revisited (2008)
- The Three Musketeers (2011)

== Children's books ==
- Conrad's War (Blackie and Son, 1978) —winner of the Guardian Children's Fiction Prize
- Marmalade and Rufus (republished in 1982 as Marmalade Atkins' Dreadful Deeds; Mammoth, 1979)
- The Legend of King Arthur (Armada, 1979) —novelization of Davies' eight-part BBC serial of the same name
- The Fantastic Feats of Doctor Boox
- Marmalade Atkins in Space (Abelard-Schuman, 1981)
- Educating Marmalade (Hamlyn, 1983)
- Danger! Marmalade at Work (Penguin, 1984)
- Marmalade Hits the Big Time (Thames/Magnet, 1984)
- Alfonso Bonzo (Methuen, 1986)

== Novels ==
- A Very Peculiar Practice (Coronet, 1986) —novelization of the first series of A Very Peculiar Practice
- A Very Peculiar Practice: The New Frontier (Methuen, 1988) —novelization of the second series
- Getting Hurt (Methuen, 1989)
- Dirty Faxes (Methuen, 1990) ― linked short stories
- B. Monkey (Lime Tree, 1992) — adapted by others as the 1998 film B. Monkey

== Stage plays ==
- Diary of a Desperate Woman (1979)
- Rose (1980)
- Prin (1990)

== Picture books ==
Andrew and Diana Davies have written at least two children's picture books.

- Poonam's Pets (Methuen Children's, 1990), illustrated by Paul Dowling
- Raj In Charge (Hamish Hamilton, 1994), illus. Debi Gliori

== Further references ==
- Cardwell, Sarah (2005) 'Andrew Davies'. Manchester: MUP.
