= Some Girls (TV series) =

British television series

- Genre: Sitcom
- Created by: Bernadette Davis
- Written by: Bernadette Davis
- Directed by: Adam Miller; Sasha Ransome
- Starring: Adelayo Adedayo; Mandeep Dhillon; Alice Felgate; Natasha Jonas; Dolly Wells; Colin Salmon; Jassa Ahluwalia; Franz Drameh
- Theme music composer: Anita Blay; Ian Masterson
- Opening theme: "Doing It Wrong" by Anita Blay
- Ending theme: "Doing It Wrong" by Anita Blay
- Country of origin: United Kingdom
- Original language: English
- No. of series: 3
- No. of episodes: 18

Production
- Executive producer: Helen Williams
- Producer: Justin Davies
- Production location: England
- Editor: William Webb
- Running time: 30 minutes
- Production company: Hat Trick Productions

Original release
- Network: BBC Three
- Release: 6 November 2012 – 22 December 2014

Some Girls is a British sitcom written by Bernadette Davis that aired on BBC Three. The show stars Adelayo Adedayo, Mandeep Dhillon, Alice Felgate, Natasha Jonas, Dolly Wells, Colin Salmon, Jassa Ahluwalia and Franz Drameh. It debuted on 6 November 2012.

BBC Three announced at the end of the first series that the show would return for a second series. On 18 September 2013, they confirmed that each episode of the second series will premiere on BBC iPlayer a week before being broadcast on BBC Three. The first episode became available on iPlayer on 23 September and was broadcast on BBC Three on 30 September, with the rest of the series following that trend. BBC Three announced in March 2014 that the show had been recommissioned for a third and final series, which aired in November and December 2014.

== Synopsis ==
(from left to right): Alice Felgate, Mandeep Dhillon, Adelayo Adedayo and Natasha Jonas.

Some Girls focuses on four 16-year-old schoolgirls – their lives, loves, and mundane teenage preoccupations, including school, boyfriends, careers and sex. They live within the same housing estate in South London, and attend the same local school, where they all play for the demoralised football team.

The chief protagonist, Viva Bennett (Adedayo), aims to "stay motivated" with her A levels, in an ambition to become a psychologist – meanwhile, she psycho-analyses her friends. Viva lives with fireman father Rob (Salmon), her sex-obsessed younger brother, Jamie (Bryon), and her stepmother – Anna Hitchcock (Wells), a New Zealander who is an unsympathetic PE teacher and football coach, at the girls' school – whom they call "Bitchcock".

Viva and her close friends' conversation spans history homework to their life goals.

The story covers the final school year of the four protagonists. The first series is set at the beginning of the new school year, when Anna reveals that she is pregnant. The second series is set a few months later, ending with the birth of the baby, and the final series is set in the summer term, concluding with the "prom" dance after which the girls all leave school.

== Cast ==
=== Regular ===
- Adelayo Adedayo as Viva Bennett, a smart and pragmatic girl with aspirations to attend university and become a psychologist.
- Alice Felgate as Amber Dean, a pretty, dim-witted girl who has an on-and-off relationship with her boyfriend, Brandon.
- Natasha Jonas as Holli Vavasour, a tomboy with anger problems who comes from a large family of siblings.
- Mandeep Dhillon as Saz Kaur, a sarcastic and cynical maths enthusiast from a strict Sikh family who is desperate for boys to like her.
- Dolly Wells as Anna "Bitchcock" Hitchcock, Viva's New Zealander stepmother and the girls' football coach, who Viva loathes. She later gives birth to Viva's half-sister, Jellybean.
- Colin Salmon as Rob Bennett, Viva's father and Anna's partner, who is a fireman.
- Jassa Ahluwalia as Rocky, Viva's boyfriend and later fiancé.

=== Recurring ===
- Nathan Bryon as Jamie Bennett, Viva's brother and Rob's son.
- Sarah Hoare as Mel, Viva's friend who has a baby named 'Baldy'.
- Franz Drameh as Brandon Taylor, Amber's on-and-off boyfriend. He lives with his domineering mother, Martine.
- Nick Holder, later Geoffrey McGivern, as Mr Jefferies, the girls' headmaster at Greenshoots Academy.
- Justine Michelle Cain as Charlie, the leader of 'The Pretties' cheerleader clique at Greenshoots Academy and Viva, Holli, Amber and Saz's worst enemy.
- Jacob Scipio as Tyler Blaine, head boy of Greenshoots Academy who becomes Viva's boyfriend for a short time, before he became a bit controlling to Viva.

== Reception ==
Some Girls has been described as: "...a comedy about the kind of girls more usually seen in worrying documentaries about inner city teens." Bernadette Davis has said: "As far as I know, there aren't any other comedies about girls of this age. The Inbetweeners has shown what a rich area for comedy this age group is - but girls are very different and I thought they should have their own show."

The Daily Mirror made the first episode of Some Girls "Tuesday's must-see TV" and described the show as "Energetic, irreverent and real". The Stage online said: "the relationship between the quartet of friends is well observed and firmly rooted in recognisable, realistic emotions". Comedian Jimmy Mulville, Managing Director of Hat Trick Productions, says: "This second series of Some Girls confirms Bernadette Davis as one of the funniest writers working today. We're lucky to have her."

== Episodes ==
=== Series overview ===
| Series | Episodes | Originally aired | |
| Series | Episodes | Premiere | Finale |
|---|---|---|---|
| 1 | 6 | 6 November 2012 | 13 December 2012 |
| 2 | 6 | 30 September 2013 | 4 November 2013 |
| 3 | 6 | 17 November 2014 | 22 December 2014 |

=== Series 1 (2012) ===
| No. | Title | Directed by | Written by | Original release date | Prod. code |
|---|---|---|---|---|---|
| 1 | "Episode 1" | Helen Williams | Bernadette Davis | 6 November 2012 | 1.1 |
After hearing some upsetting news from her dad, Viva decides to leave home and live with her friends. Elsewhere on the estate, Amber is finding it very hard to dump her boyfriend, despite plenty of varied advice from Viva, Saz and Holli.
| 2 | "Episode 2" | Adam Miller | Bernadette Davis | 13 November 2012 | 1.2 |
Amber's new boyfriend Ryan seems to have a mysterious secret, which the girls are determined to discover. Meanwhile, Holli's attempt to give her little brother a wonderful birthday present goes horribly wrong.
| 3 | "Episode 3" | Adam Miller | Bernadette Davis | 20 November 2012 | 1.3 |
Viva invites her friends to help babysit, but then struggles to keep control of the situation. Saz is very upset about some bitchy girls, Amber is very jealous of her ex-boyfriend's new girlfriend and Holli is just worried there won't be enough to drink.
| 4 | "Episode 4" | Adam Miller | Bernadette Davis | 27 November 2012 | 1.4 |
Holli throws down a rash challenge to the boys' football team, whilst Viva feels torn over her feelings for bad boy Rocky. Amber has found a lunchtime pizza club - a Christian group, it turns out. Saz boasts about a new boyfriend, who may or may not actually exist.
| 5 | "Episode 5" | Adam Miller | Bernadette Davis | 4 December 2012 | 1.5 |
Amber struggles to cope with her feelings for her ex-boyfriend Brandon, especially now that he's going to be a daddy. Viva is asked to manage an anti-bullying presentation at school - and to look after bullying victim, Ruby. Saz and Ruby do not get on.
| 6 | "Episode 6" | Adam Miller | Bernadette Davis | 11 December 2012 | 1.6 |
Saz is determined to lose her virginity and sets about finding the ideal boy and the ideal location with the help of her friends. It becomes apparent that not everyone has been telling the truth about their sex life.

=== Series 2 (2013) ===
| No. overall | No. in series | Title | Directed by | Written by | Original release date | Prod. code |
|---|---|---|---|---|---|---|
| 7 | 1 | "Episode 1" | Adam Miller | Bernadette Davis | 30 September 2013 | 2.1 |
Viva is worried that Rocky is getting too serious about their relationship, while Saz is worried she's not normal. A new school counsellor has a big impact on Greenshoots Academy - though not in the way he intended.
| 8 | 2 | "Episode 2" | Adam Miller | Bernadette Davis | 7 October 2013 | 2.2 |
After falling out with the group after an eventful party, Holli has to find a new set of friends. Saz and Amber both like the same boy and Viva is distressed about being forced to give up a precious toy.
| 9 | 3 | "Episode 3" | Adam Miller | Bernadette Davis | 14 October 2013 | 2.3 |
Rivalry gets out of hand when Viva's group clashes with Charlie's gang over the affections of Greenshoots Academy head boy, Tyler Blaine. Amber's dog finds out what Amber gets up to at school.
| 10 | 4 | "Episode 4" | Adam Miller | Bernadette Davis | 21 October 2013 | 2.4 |
Rocky's friendship with Viva's dad causes problems with Viva's new boyfriend Tyler. Saz receives mysterious love notes from an admirer, and Holli helps out Anna with the school magazine.
| 11 | 5 | "Episode 5" | Adam Miller | Bernadette Davis | 28 October 2013 | 2.5 |
Anna goes on maternity leave, meaning Holli and Saz compete to be the new manager of the Greenshoots girls' football team. Viva has some troubling thoughts about her ex-boyfriend Rocky, and Amber's ex-boyfriend Brandon needs help.
| 12 | 6 | "Episode 6" | Adam Miller | Bernadette Davis | 4 November 2013 | 2.6 |
Viva makes friends with a boy who is feeling sad like her. When the girls crash a party hosted by Rocky's new girlfriend Gemma, Saz gets a nasty shock. Meanwhile, Anna's baby is due any day.

=== Series 3 (2014) ===
| No. overall | No. in series | Title | Directed by | Written by | Original release date | Prod. code |
|---|---|---|---|---|---|---|
| 13 | 1 | "Episode 1" | Sasha Ransome | Bernadette Davis | 17 November 2014 | 3.1 |
Viva is surprised when Rocky tells her he is dropping out of school. Viva tries to persuade him that it's not a good idea, but Rocky has another, even bigger, surprise for Viva. Holli is saving for a secret project. Amber is worried about Brandon who seems to have disappeared.
| 14 | 2 | "Episode 2" | Sasha Ransome | Bernadette Davis | 24 November 2014 | 3.2 |
The girls head off for their first music festival. Despite having to work on a t-shirt stall they still manage to pack in plenty of fun, hanging out with three boys in the tent next door. Fed up with the other girls calling her boring, Viva decides to take advantage of some new experiences on offer at the festival.
| 15 | 3 | "Episode 3" | Sasha Ransome | Bernadette Davis | 1 December 2014 | 3.3 |
Amber wants a baby, even though she hasn't even got a boyfriend. Rocky's new job as nanny to Viva's baby sister causes problems for the two of them. Saz tries to coach Amber and Holli through their maths GCSE, but they are not willing to take it seriously.
| 16 | 4 | "Episode 4" | Sasha Ransome | Bernadette Davis | 8 December 2014 | 3.4 |
Viva tries to mend Amber and her sister Topaz's relationship, but regrets interfering when she realises what Topaz is really like. Mr Jefferies attempts to get Greenshoots Academy on TV, to the disdain of the other teachers. Meanwhile, Anna wallows in anger (by ripping cardboard boxes) over Rob being chosen for a charity firemen calendar, knowing that other women will be ogling at "her man".
| 17 | 5 | "Episode 5" | Sasha Ransome | Bernadette Davis | 15 December 2014 | 3.5 |
Amber is selected to do a trial for Chelsea Ladies. Holli's romantic life becomes more complicated.
| 18 | 6 | "Episode 6" | Sasha Ransome | Bernadette Davis | 22 December 2014 | 3.6 |
It's the girls' prom night soon and Amber is in charge of planning. Viva has been roped into decorating with a tropical theme by Miss Hitchcock. Saz and Gabriel are having problems with Prom and Holli is also having problems.

== Awards and nominations ==
| Category | Award | Year | Result |
|---|---|---|---|
| Best Tape & Editing: Entertainment & Situation Comedy | Royal Television Society, UK | 2014 | Nominee |
