= Ben Chaplin =

British actor (born 1969)

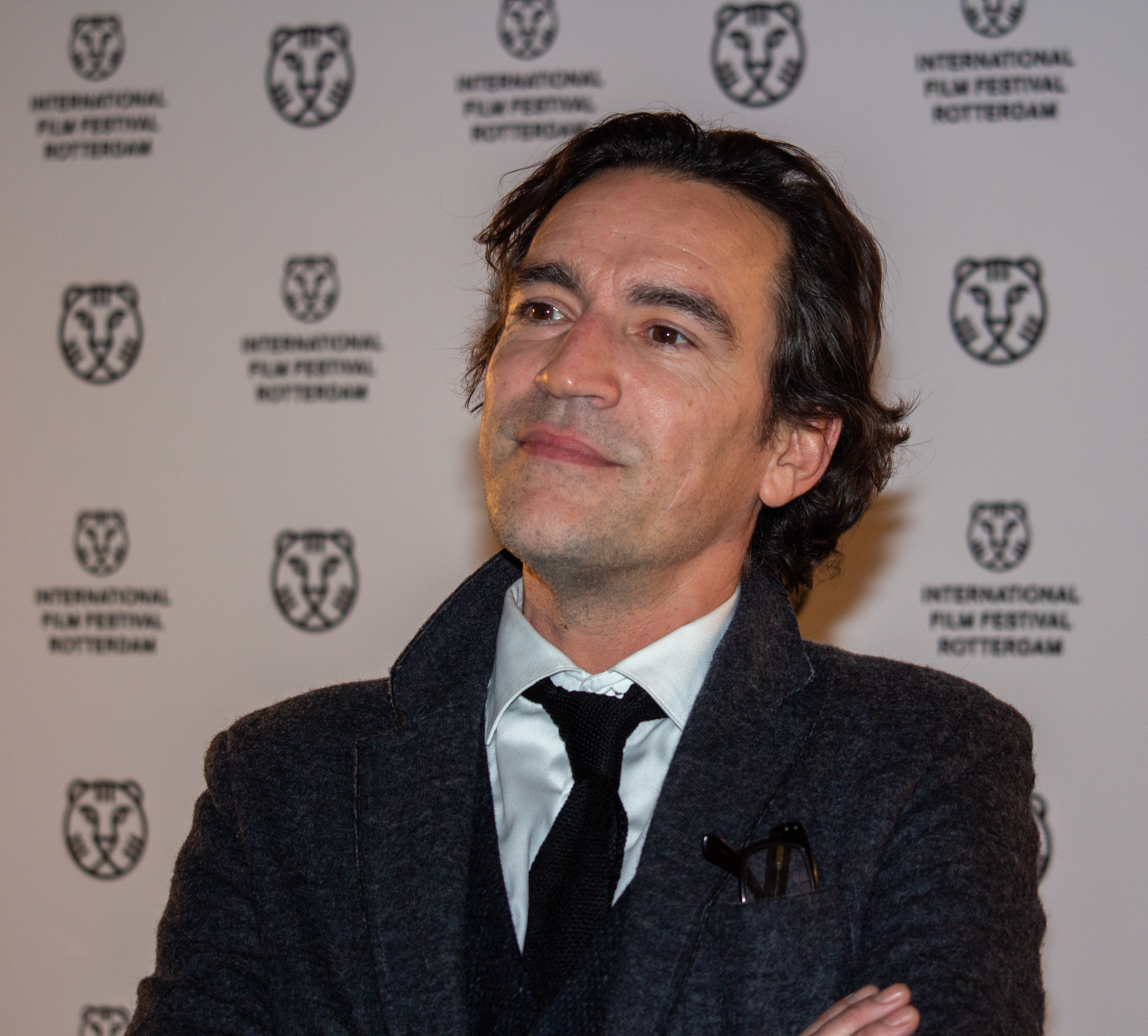
- Chaplin at the IFFR 2015
- Born: Benedict John Greenwood; 31 July 1969 (age 57); Windsor, Berkshire, England
- Education: Guildhall School of Music and Drama
- Occupation: Actor
- Years active: 1990–present

Benedict John Greenwood (born 31 July 1969), better known as Ben Chaplin, is a British actor. He is best known for his roles in films, including Feast of July (1995), The Thin Red Line (1998), Lost Souls (2000), Birthday Girl (2001), Murder by Numbers (2002), Stage Beauty (2004), The New World (2005), Me and Orson Welles (2008), London Boulevard (2010), Twixt (2011), The Wipers Times (2013), War Book (2014), Snowden (2016), and September 5 (2024). His TV roles include Soldier Soldier (1991), World Without End (2012) and The Nevers (2021–2023).

== Early life ==
Chaplin was born on 31 July 1969 in Windsor, in the county of Berkshire, England, the son of Cynthia (née Chaplin), a teacher, and Peter Greenwood CBE, a civil engineer. He has one sister, Rachel, and one brother, Justin.

Chaplin became interested in acting as a teenager, after acting in a theatrical production in his school years at the Princess Margaret Royal Free School. At the age of seventeen, he enrolled at the Guildhall School of Music and Drama in London. He pursued his early acting career between odd jobs as an office worker, and for a while was employed as a statistician with the London Transport Authority.

== Career ==
Taking his stage name from his mother's maiden name, Chaplin began his professional career performing in BBC television dramas in bit parts, and occasional cinema films. In 1992, he appeared in his first major role, starring alongside Jason Flemyng in Bye Bye Baby for Channel Four. James Ivory and Ismail Merchant cast him as a servant in The Remains of the Day; also in 1992, he appeared in Between the Lines (series 1, episode 1), and as the socially inept Con Wainwright in Feast of July (1995). Chaplin received good reviews as Tom Wingfield in Sam Mendes' stage production of The Glass Menagerie and was nominated for an Olivier award (1995) in London, and played the lead role of Matthew in the first series of the British sitcom Game On (BBC Two, 1995), and left after one series. Neil Stuke played the same role for the final two series.

In the United States, he was cast by director Michael Lehmann as a photographer caught between two women (Uma Thurman and Janeane Garofalo) in the romantic comedy The Truth About Cats & Dogs (1996), a retelling of Cyrano de Bergerac. He next played fortune-hunting Morris Townsend in a retelling of Washington Square (1997), co-starring Jennifer Jason Leigh. The film received positive reviews, but was a box office failure. Chaplin next played Private Bell in Terrence Malick's remake of The Thin Red Line (1998). Meanwhile, after numerous delays, the apocalyptical horror film Lost Souls (2000), which was filmed in 1998, was finally released.

He appeared as a introverted bank clerk who purchases a Russian mail-order bride (Nicole Kidman) in Birthday Girl (2001). He next played opposite Sandra Bullock as her relatively inexperienced partner in an investigation into a series of killings in Murder by Numbers (2002). After co-starring opposite Michelle Yeoh in the Taiwan-made action film The Touch (2002), Chaplin played George Villiers, 2nd Duke of Buckingham in the romantic drama, Stage Beauty (2004), set in the world of British theatre in the 1660s. Chaplin next had a supporting role in Chromophobia (2005), a dark thriller about a bourgeois family coming apart at the seams, also starring Penélope Cruz, Ralph Fiennes and Ian Holm. He had a small role in The New World (2005), Terrence Malick's film about the affair between Pocahontas (Q'Orianka Kilcher) and Captain John Smith (Colin Farrell). In the comedic drama Two Weeks (2006), Chaplin was one of four siblings who return home to say goodbye to their ailing mother (Sally Field). Following a supporting role in the children's fantasy The Water Horse: Legend of the Deep (2007), Chaplin portrayed prominent English stage and film actor George Coulouris in Me and Orson Welles (2009), directed by indie filmmaker Richard Linklater. He also appeared in the television miniseries World Without End (2012), where he portrayed Thomas Langley, adapted from the novel of the same name by Welsh author Ken Follett.

He received an Olivier Award nomination for Best Supporting Performer in The Glass Menagerie, and a Tony Award nomination for Best Featured Actor in The Retreat from Moscow. Recent theatre appearances include This Is How It Goes at the Donmar Warehouse in 2005, The Reporter at the National Theatre in 2007, and Farewell to the Theatre at the Hampstead Theatre in 2012. He appeared in Dates on Channel 4 in 2013, and recent film roles include the role of Cinderella's father in Cinderella (2015). He starred in Apple Tree Yard with Emily Watson in 2017.

In 2017, he appeared in the premiere production of Consent at the Royal National Theatre, London. Chaplin starred in the Joe Penhall play Mood Music at The Old Vic Theatre. He starred in The Children Act (2017), adapted from the Ian McEwan novel of the same name. He starred in the BBC series Press with Charlotte Riley, as unethical tabloid editor Duncan Allen, a role which won him a number of positive reviews.

== Filmography ==
=== Film ===
Year	Title	Role	Notes
1993	The Remains of the Day	Charlie, Head Footman	
1995	Feast of July	Con Wainwright	
1996	The Truth About Cats & Dogs	Brian	
1997	Washington Square	Morris Townsend	
1998	The Thin Red Line	Private Bell	
2000	Lost Souls	Peter Kelson	
2001	Birthday Girl	John	
2002	Murder by Numbers	Sam Kennedy	
2002	The Touch	Eric	
2004	Stage Beauty	George Villiers, 2nd Duke of Buckingham	
2005	Chromophobia	Trent	
2005	The New World	Robinson	
2006	Two Weeks	Keith Bergman	
2007	The Water Horse: Legend of the Deep	Lewis Mowbray	
2008	Me and Orson Welles	George Coulouris	
2009	Dorian Gray	Basil Hallward	
2010	London Boulevard	Billy Norton	
2010	Ways to Live Forever	Daniel MacQueen	
2011	Twixt	Poe	
2014	War Book	Gary	
2015	Cinderella	Ella's Father	
2015	Little Boy	Ben Eagle	
2016	Snowden	Robert Tibbo	
2016	The Legend of Tarzan	Captain Moulle	
2017	The Children Act	Kevin Henry	
2019	Roads	Paul	
2021	The Dig	Stuart Piggott	
2024	September 5	Marvin Bader	
2027	Panic Carefully		Post-production

=== Television ===
Year	Title	Role	Notes
1990	Casualty	Gareth Orell	Episode: "A Reasonable Man"
1991	Soldier Soldier	Fusilier Jago	2 episodes
1992	A Fatal Inversion	Matthew	Episode: "Episode One"
1992	Between the Lines	Andy Spence	Episode: "Private Enterprise"
1992	Performance	Cyril Carter	Episode: "After the Dance"
1993	Minder	Conway	Episode: "Uneasy Rider"
1993	The Return of the Borrowers	Ditchley	4 episodes
1994	Class Act	Carlos	Episode: "Episode 4"
1995	Game On	Matthew	6 episodes
1995	Resort to Murder	Joshua Penny	Miniseries
2011–2012	Mad Dogs (British)	Alvo	5 episodes
2012	World Without End	Sir Thomas Langley	Miniseries
2013	Dates	Stephen	3 episodes
2013	The Wipers Times	Captain Frederick John Roberts	Television film
2013	Doll & Em	Ben	Episode: "Six"
2013	Moonfleet	Magistrate Mohune	Miniseries
2014	The Secrets	Philip	Episode: "The Lie"
2015	The Book of Negroes	Captain John Clarkson	Miniseries
2015–2016	Mad Dogs (American)	Joel	10 episodes
2017	Apple Tree Yard	Mr X / Mark Costley	4 episodes
2017	Urban Myths	Cary Grant	Episode: "Cary Grant and Timothy Leary"
2018	Press	Duncan Allen	Miniseries
2020	The Letter for the King	Black Knight	2 episodes
2021–2023	The Nevers	Detective Frank Mundi	Main cast
2023	Mrs. Davis	Arthur Schrödinger	3 episodes
