= Bernadette Davis =

British screenwriter

Bernadette Davis is an English screenwriter who co-wrote the first two series of the BBC's sitcom Game On with Andrew Davies. She wrote the third series on her own and was nominated for a BAFTA award for the series in 1997.

== Education ==
Davis studied English and drama at Goldsmiths College, University of London.

== Career ==
In 1996, Davis co-wrote the mini-TV series Wilderness with Andrew Davies, from the novel by Dennis Danvers. She also wrote an episode of Soldier Soldier in 1997, titled "Line of Departure".

She wrote a 6-episode sitcom series called The Wilsons in 2000, which featured David Bradley and Julian Rhind-Tutt.

In 2012, she wrote the BBC Three sitcom series Some Girls. Series 1 aired in November 2012, and series 2 started airing in September 2013.

Some Girls has been described as: "...a comedy about the kind of girls more usually seen in worrying documentaries about inner city teens. The series centres around a group of 16/17 year old pupils at [a] Comprehensive School in London." Davis herself said about the show: "As far as I know, there aren't any other comedies about girls of this age. The Inbetweeners has shown what a rich area for comedy this age group is - but girls are very different and I thought they should have their own show."

== Reception ==
The Daily Mirror made the first episode of Some Girls "Tuesday's must-see TV" and described the show as "Energetic, irreverent and real". The Stage online said: "the relationship between the quartet of friends is well observed and firmly rooted in recognisable, realistic emotions". Comedian Jimmy Mulville, Managing Director of Hat Trick Productions, says: “This second series of Some Girls confirms Bernadette Davis as one of the funniest writers working today. We're lucky to have her.”

Game On was said to be "a part of a zeitgeist that came to define a generation" and was a "sitcom that was so of its time, that it took its name from a catchphrase of the decade."
