= Dennis Danvers =

American novelist

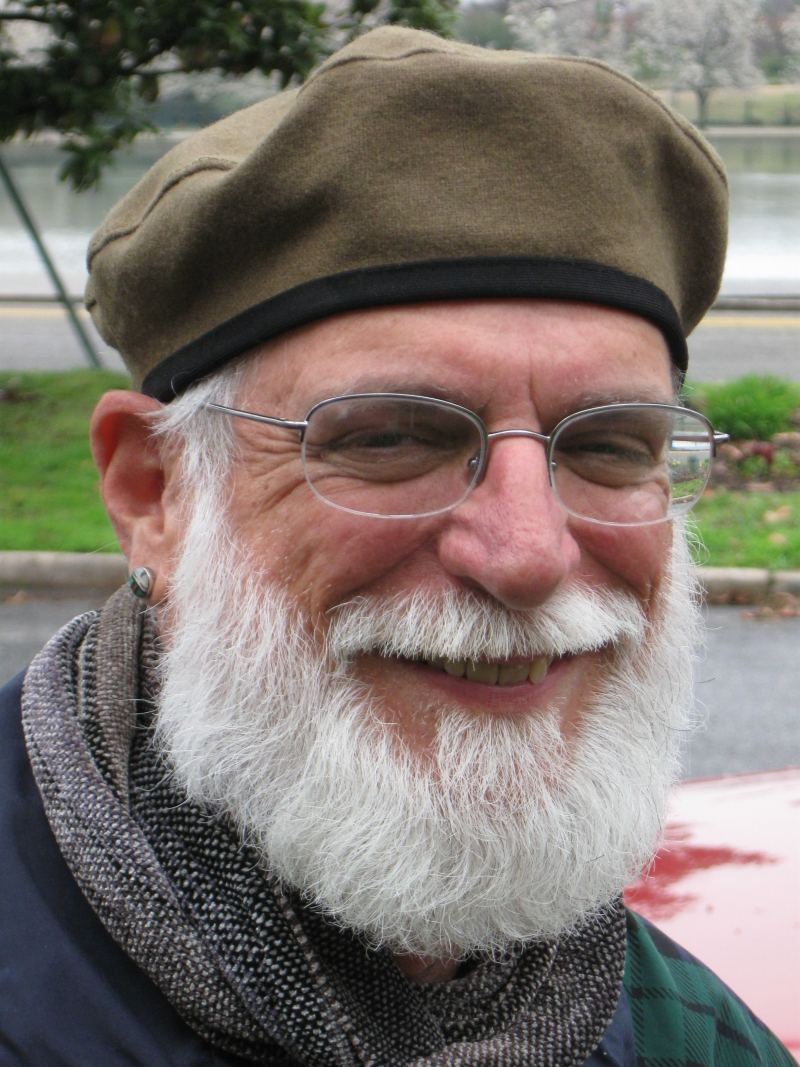
- Born: 1947 (age 78–79)
- Occupation: Author
- Writing career
- Pen name: Robert Sydney
- Genre: Science fiction
- Website: dennisdanvers.com

Dennis Danvers (born 1947) is an American author of science fiction novels. He lives in Richmond, Virginia. He is the president of the Byrd Park Civic League.

== Bibliography ==
- Wilderness (1991) – Nominated for the Bram Stoker Award for Best First Novel
- Time and Time Again (1994), ISBN 0-671-78800-0
- Circuit of Heaven (1998), ISBN 0-380-97447-9
- End of Days (1999), ISBN 0-380-97448-7
- The Fourth World (2000), ISBN 0-380-97761-3
- The Watch (2002), ISBN 0-380-97762-1, described as "being the unauthorized sequel to Peter A. Kropotkin's Memoirs of a Revolutionist as imparted to Dennis Danvers by Anchee Mahur, traveler from a distant future"
- The Bright Spot (2005), ISBN 0-553-58759-5, written under the pen name Robert Sydney.
- Bad Angels (2015)
- Adult Children of Alien Beings. A Tor.Com Original (2015) ISBN 978-146-6889-699
- Orphan Pirates of the Spanish Main. A Tor.Com Original (2016) ISBN 978-076-5389-459
- Once More Into The Abyss. A Tor.Com Original (2016) ISBN 978-076-5390-639

=== Critical studies and reviews of Danvers' work ===
- Killheffer, Robert K. J. (Aug 2000). "[Review of The fourth world]". Books. F&SF. 99 (2): 26–32. Archived from the original on December 27, 2004.
