= Chicken Shop Date =

British YouTube interview series

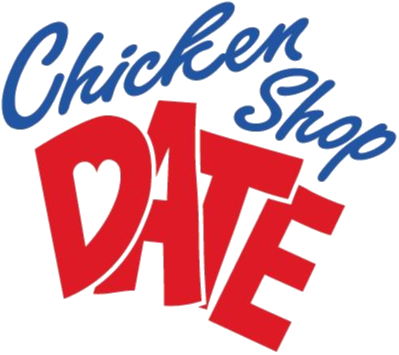
- Genre: Interview
- Created by: Amelia Dimoldenberg
- Written by: Amelia Dimoldenberg; Ania Magliano
- Presented by: Amelia Dimoldenberg
- Country of origin: United Kingdom
- Original language: English
- No. of episodes: 120

Production
- Executive producer: Amelia Dimoldenberg
- Production company: Dimz Inc.

Original release
- Network: YouTube
- Release: 12 March 2014 – 2026

Chicken Shop Date is a British YouTube interview show created and hosted by Amelia Dimoldenberg, and produced by her production company Dimz Inc. The show features celebrity interviews that are framed as dates in a local chicken shop.

The series' first YouTube video was posted in March 2014, and as of 13 November 2026, 120 episodes have been released. The show has been nominated for several awards, winning Indie Series at the Streamy Awards in 2022 after garnering popularity for its "gleeful subversion of the classic late-night talk show format."

On 3 September 2026, Dimoldenberg announced that the show would be ending after twelve years.

== Format ==
The format of Chicken Shop Date involves Amelia Dimoldenberg meeting a celebrity guest at a local chicken shop for a date. A humorous element is the setting of the chicken shop, a brightly lit fast food shop that is generally not considered a romantic setting.

Dimoldenberg has revealed that each episode takes around forty minutes to film, but finished episodes last no longer than eight minutes. "Only the funniest, flirtiest moments survive, spliced together with strategically deployed B-roll of food prep and the chicken shop's staff at work." Questions asked are often chaotic, awkward, and playful, as well as questions such as "snog, marry, avoid?". Dimoldenberg flirts with her guests, often alternating between flattery and teasing insults.

== Production ==
Chicken Shop Date is shot in fried-chicken restaurants around London. Each episode costs around six thousand dollars to produce. As of March 2025, Dimoldenberg employed a creative producer, a social media manager, and a personal assistant. Since “Chicken Shop Date” is released roughly once a month, she selects her guests carefully, stating "It has to feel like an organic fit. I need to genuinely be a fan of them and their work. If I fancy them, that's a bonus. It is a dating show, after all." Dimoldenberg usually films for thirty to forty minutes. In the show's early years, final episodes were trimmed to three or four minutes, but they now often extend up to twelve.

Dimoldenberg's onscreen persona is largely shaped during the editing process, which she oversees. The character's standoffishness and awkwardness are accentuated through jump cuts and extended shots of her expressive, often quizzical facial expressions.

== History ==
Amelia Dimoldenberg

Chicken Shop Date originally began as a column written by a then 17-year-old Dimoldenberg for her local under-21s youth magazine. Beginning by interviewing 'friends of friends', she decided to frame the chats as dates 'because that might be a fun way to interview people'. The location of a chicken shop was chosen as "somewhere you wouldn't expect to be taken on a first date". In 2014, Dimoldenberg met a camera operator, whom she "convinced to help film one of her dates". This was with the rapper Ghetts and was the first Chicken Shop Date video uploaded to YouTube. It attracted just over one thousand views in the first two weeks.

Initially, Chicken Shop Date exclusively featured male guests, as Dimoldenberg was hesitant to include women out of concern that the dating premise would not translate. However, reconsidering this literal interpretation, she began featuring female guests in 2017, and some of the show's most popular episodes have since included women. At first, as with the original column, most of the interviews were with musicians in the south London grime and hip-hop scene. In 2020, actor Daniel Kaluuya became her first major guest outside of music to be featured, with their video garnering five million views and setting the stage for other major stars to be featured on the show.

In 2024, Dimoldenberg's interview with Andrew Garfield became particularly successful, largely due to a viral "meet-cute" that took place between her and Garfield on the red carpet of the 2022 British GQ Men of the Year awards, and a second meeting on the red carpet of the 2023 Golden Globe Awards.

On 3 September 2026, Dimoldenberg announced that, after twelve years, the show would be ending. She said there would be "a few more dates" before the show officially ended.

== List of episodes ==
=== 2014 ===
No.	Date of Episode	Guest
1	12 March	Ghetts
2	30 June	Logan Sama
3	6 November	Fuse ODG

=== 2015 ===
No.	Date of Episode	Guest
4	13 February	Jammer
5	20 December	Asim Chaudhry (Note: In character as Chabuddy G from People Just Do Nothing)

=== 2016 ===
No.	Date of Episode	Guest
6	27 July	AJ Tracey
7	21 September	Arnold Jorge
8	8 November	Raleigh Ritchie
9	7 December	67

=== 2017 ===
No.	Date of Episode	Guest
10	7 February	Cadet
11	14 February	The Chicken Connoisseur
12	31 March	Avelino
13	9 August	Kurupt FM
14	23 August	Maya Jama
15	6 September	Santan Dave
16	16 November	Krept and Konan

=== 2018 ===
No.	Date of Episode	Guest
17	14 February	Not3s
18	17 April	Big Narstie
19	7 June	Suspect
20	5 July	Lady Leshurr
21	30 July	Big Zuu
22	9 August	Headie One
23	25 August	Sean Paul
24	6 September	D Double E
25	20 September	Mahalia
26	25 October	Mo Gilligan

=== 2019 ===
No.	Date of Episode	Guest
27	13 January	Donae'o
28	4 February	Ms Banks
29	21 February	Chip
30	15 March	Charlie Cooper (Note: In character as Kurtan from This Country)
31	5 June	KSI
32	26 June	Aitch
33	25 October	M Huncho

=== 2020 ===
No.	Date of Episode	Guest
34	30 January	Daniel Kaluuya
35	14 February	Darkoo
36	26 March	Chunkz & Yung Filly
37	7 May	Mike Skinner
38	18 June	Munya Chawawa (Note: In character as Unknown P)
39	1 July	Jamie Demetriou (Note: In character as Stath from Stath Lets Flats)
40	23 July	6lack
41	2 October	Dutchavelli
42	18 December	Digga D
43	30 December	Jade Thirlwall

=== 2021 ===
No.	Date of Episode	Guest
44	17 February	Slowthai
45	18 March	Bimini Bon-Boulash
46	21 May	ArrDee
47	27 June	M1llionz
48	27 August	Shaybo
49	10 September	Jack Harlow
50	24 September	Tion Wayne
51	8 October	Joy Crookes
52	22 October	Finneas
53	3 November	Ed Sheeran
54	17 November	Giveon
55	22 December	Tammy Abraham & John Stones

=== 2022 ===
No.	Date of Episode	Guest
56	4 February	Bandokay
57	18 February	Louis Theroux
58	18 March	Rex Orange County
59	1 April	Charli XCX
60	15 April	Nella Rose
61	29 April	Rosalía
62	13 May	Kojey Radical
63	8 July	Lucy Bronze & Beth Mead
64	22 July	Burna Boy
65	5 August	Summer Walker
66	12 August	Keke Palmer
67	26 August	Yungblud
68	23 September	Rema
69	14 October	Matty Healy
70	25 November	Meekz
71	9 December	Paddy Pimblett & Molly McCann
72	23 December	Phoebe Bridgers

=== 2023 ===
No.	Date of Episode	Guest
73	20 January	Kehlani
74	3 February	Fumez the Engineer
75	14 February	Central Cee
76	10 March	Shania Twain
77	31 March	Flo
78	12 May	Lewis Capaldi
79	26 May	Jonas Brothers
80	30 June	Jennifer Lawrence
81	11 August	Fredo
82	13 October	Kaytranada
83	3 November	Sean Evans
84	24 November	Dominic Fike
85	1 December	Cher
86	15 December	Chicken Run: Dawn of the Nugget

=== 2024 ===
No.	Date of Episode	Guest
87	26 January	Paul Mescal
88	22 March	Lando Norris
89	10 May	Potter Payper
90	24 May	Tems
91	7 June	Raye
92	21 June	Eric André
93	5 July	SZA
94	12 July	Billie Eilish
95	27 July	Ryan Reynolds & Hugh Jackman
96	23 August	Sabrina Carpenter
97	27 September	Ghetts (2) (Note: 10 Year Anniversary special)
98	18 October	Andrew Garfield
99	15 November	Elmo

=== 2025 ===
No.	Date of Episode	Guest
100	31 January	Cynthia Erivo
101	21 February	Harris Dickinson
102	7 March	Jennie
103	21 March	Alex Consani
104	11 April	Ben Stiller
105	9 May	Little Simz
106	6 June	Bella Hadid
107	13 June	Loyle Carner
108	20 June	Addison Rae
109	27 June	Idris Elba
110	3 July	Jonathan Bailey
111	11 July	Damson Idris
112	25 July	Trixie Mattel

=== 2026 ===
No.	Date of Episode	Guest
113	13 March	Conan O'Brien
114	29 May	Paul McCartney
115	19 June	Zara Larsson
116	2 October	Role Model
117	16 October	Jorja Smith
118	23 October	Noel Gallagher
119	6 November	Nemzzz
120	13 November	Jack O'Connell

== Reception ==
Jason Zinoman of The New York Times described Dimoldenberg as "flamboyantly unimpressed", and that "over the past decade, she has consistently produced entertainingly charged conversations."

== Accolades ==
Year	Award	Category	Nominee(s)	Result	Ref.
2021	Streamy Awards	Indie Series	Chicken Shop Date	Won	
2022	Streamy Awards	Unscripted Series	Chicken Shop Date	Nominated	
2022	Streamy Awards	Show of the Year	Chicken Shop Date	Nominated	
2023	National Television Awards	Interview Series	Chicken Shop Date	Nominated	
2023	Streamy Awards	Unscripted Series	Chicken Shop Date	Nominated	
2023	Streamy Awards	Show of the Year	Chicken Shop Date	Nominated	

== See also ==
- Hot Ones
- The Chicken Connoisseur
