= Allan Mustafa =

British actor, comedian and writer (born 1985)

- Born: Allan Kamal Arif Mustafa; 29 September 1985 (age 40); Surrey, England
- Occupations: Actor, comedian, writer
- Years active: 2012–present

Allan Kamal Arif Mustafa (born 29 September 1985), also known by his nickname Seapa, is a British actor, comedian and writer who is best known for portraying Anthony "MC Grindah" Zografos in the BBC mockumentary series People Just Do Nothing, which he co-created and co-wrote with Steve Stamp, Hugo Chegwin and Asim Chaudhry.

== Early and personal life ==
Allan Kamal Arif Mustafa was born on 29 September 1985 to immigrant parents; his mother is from the Czech Republic and his father was Kurdish-Iraqi. His parents fled Baghdad, due to Saddam Hussein's regime, in the early 1980s. He has an older sister. His father died in 2012.

Mustafa grew up in Chessington, Kingston upon Thames and attended Chessington School. As a teenager he had jobs at Chessington World of Adventures and as a cleaner at a carpet shop. He has said that he was arrested around six times as a teenager, mainly for graffiti, the first time being when he was around 14 years old.

Growing up, Mustafa had a passion for music and used to rap, MC and was involved in pirate radio. He did a music production course at Thames Valley College, which he ended up dropping out of. He later worked in a call centre with Hugo Chegwin, Asim Chaudhry, and Daniel Sylvester Woolford. With whom, along with their friend Steve Stamp, he would go on to create the show People Just Do Nothing.

== Career ==
Mustafa met Hugo Chegwin, through a mutual friend, after which Chegwin introduced Mustafa to Steve Stamp and Asim Chaudhry, with whom he created YouTube mockumentary videos about a fictional pirate radio station. This led to the group being commissioned for People Just Do Nothing, a BBC mockumentary about West London pirate radio station Kurupt FM. The pilot aired on BBC iPlayer in July 2012. The show ran for five series, winning a BAFTA and a Royal Television Society Award. In 2019, production began on a feature length adaptation of the series called People Just Do Nothing: Big in Japan. The film was positively received by both fans and critics.

Mustafa appeared in the 2020 Netflix film Love Wedding Repeat as Chaz, the boyfriend of Freida Pinto's character Amanda.

Mustafa starred for two series of the BBC Radio 4 sitcom Ability as the "useless carer" Bob, for the character played by comedian Lee Ridley, who also wrote the series.

In 2022, he wrote and starred in the Channel 4 series The Curse, and the BBC Three series Peacock.

Mustafa is also part of a trio of food and travel enthusiasts known as The Taste Cadets, alongside former chef Kieran Cavanagh and tattoo artist Marcus Adams.

== Filmography ==
Year	Title	Role	Notes
2012	BBC Comedy Feeds	Sniper	Episode: "People Just Do Nothing"
2014–2018	People Just Do Nothing	Grindah	27 episodes; also co-writer and co-creator
2017	Chicken Shop Date	MC Grindah	Episode: "Kurupt FM"
2017	Sounds Like Friday Night	Grindah	Episode #1.1
2018	Kurupt FM vs Top Gear	Grindah	Television film
2020	Love Wedding Repeat	Chaz	Feature film
2021	People Just Do Nothing: Big in Japan	MC Grindah	Also co-writer
2022	The Witchfinder	Grocer	Episode #1.5
2022	Kurupt FM the Greatest Hits	MC Grindah	Online video
2022–2023	The Curse	Albert	6 episodes; also co-writer
2022–2024	Peacock	Andy Peacock	Series lead (9 episodes)
2023	Jackdaw		Feature film
2024	Ludwig	Gary Jennings	1 episode
