= The Curse (British TV series) =

- Genre: Crime comedy drama
- Created by: Steve Stamp; Allan Mustafa; Hugo Chegwin
- Narrated by: Camille Coduri
- Country of origin: United Kingdom
- Original language: English
- No. of series: 2
- No. of episodes: 12

Production
- Executive producers: Hugo Chegwin; Tom Davis; James De Frond; Allan Mustafa; Steve Stamp
- Producer: Richard Webb
- Running time: 55 minutes
- Production company: Shiny Button Productions

Original release
- Network: Channel 4
- Release: 6 February 2022 – 27 April 2023

The Curse is a British comedy crime drama series which is broadcast on Channel 4.

== Cast ==
- Allan Mustafa as Albert Fantoni
- Abraham Popoola as Joe Boy
- Steve Stamp as Sidney Wilson
- Tom Davis as Big Mick Neville
- Hugo Chegwin as Phil 'The Captain' Pocket
- Emer Kenny as Natasha "Tash" Fantoni
- Natalie Klamar as Candice
- Peter Ferdinando as Crazy Clive Cornell
- Michael Smiley as Ronnie Gatlin
- Geoff Bell as Detective Saunders
- Ambreen Razia as Detective Thread
- Ramon Tikaram as Billy English

== Synopsis ==
The Curse is a comedy crime drama series. Series 1 is set in London in the early 1980s, following a gang of hopeless small-time crooks who, through their own stupidity and poor judgement, find themselves embroiled in one of the biggest gold heists in history. The theme alludes to "The Curse of the Brink's-Mat millions", referring to a series of deaths related to the 1983 Brink's-Mat robbery.

== Episodes ==
=== Series 1 ===
| Series | Episode | Episode Name | Description |
|---|---|---|---|
| 1 | 1 | Would You? | When Albert and his pals get more than they bargained for, life is set to change forever. |
| 1 | 2 | Act Normal | News of the robbery spreads far and wide, and the police start to sniff around. |
| 1 | 3 | The Fear | Albert and Natasha get an offer they can't refuse, and the gang escape to a safe house. |
| 1 | 4 | The Monkey and the Cat | Albert throws himself into smelting gold. Money is rolling in, but cracks start to show. |
| 1 | 5 | Millionaires | As Mick and Phil's antics draw unwanted attention, is time running out for the whole gang? |
| 1 | 6 | Somewhere Over the Rainbow | Both the police and Ma McTavish are hot on the gang's heels. Good job Albert has a plan... |

=== Series 2 ===
| Series | Episode | Episode Name | Description |
|---|---|---|---|
| 2 | 1 | Costa del Crime | While Mick languishes in prison, Albert, Tash and Sidney have escaped to start a new life on the Costa del Crime. |
| 2 | 2 | Unwelcome Guests | Tash and Albert receive some unexpected visitors who threaten to upend everything they've built in Spain. |
| 2 | 3 | All Roads Lead to Pablo | The boys head to Colombia to meet the cartel. Meanwhile, Tash's friendship with undercover Detective Thread blossoms, and Sidney has an unexpected visitor at his beach bar. |
| 2 | 4 | Kill the Story | All hell breaks loose as the gang become front-page news. Their new life in Spain is under threat and drastic action is needed. |
| 2 | 5 | Lost at Sea | As the boys head out to sea to make the trade with the Colombians, Tash receives an unwelcome visitor whose arrival changes everything. |
| 2 | 6 | Sundown | Tash is under arrest. While the gang ponder their next move, Albert makes a shocking discovery that forces the boys to make their final decision. |
