= People Just Do Nothing: Big in Japan =

2021 British comedy film by Jack Clough

- Theatrical release poster
- Directed by: Jack Clough
- Written by: Steve Stamp; Allan Mustafa
- Based on: People Just Do Nothing by: Steve Stamp; Allan Mustafa; Hugo Chegwin; Asim Chaudhry
- Produced by: Claire Jones; Tim Sealey
- Starring: Allan Mustafa; Hugo Chegwin; Asim Chaudhry; Steve Stamp; Dan Sylvester; Lily Brazier; Hitomi Souno; Ken Yamamura; Nero Huang
- Production company: Roughcut Films
- Distributed by: Focus Features Universal Pictures
- Release date: 18 August 2021
- Running time: 96 minutes
- Country: United Kingdom
- Language: English

People Just Do Nothing: Big in Japan is a 2021 British mockumentary comedy film directed by Jack Clough, serving as a continuation of the television series People Just Do Nothing. The film stars Allan Mustafa, Hugo Chegwin, Asim Chaudhry, Steve Stamp, Dan Sylvester, Lily Brazier, Hitomi Souno, Ken Yamamura, and Nero Huang.

People Just Do Nothing: Big in Japan was released in the United Kingdom on 18 August 2021.

== Plot ==
Three years after the final transmission of Kurupt FM and the crew moving to Essex (series 5 of People Just Do Nothing), Anthony "MC Grindah" Zografos works as a postman, Kevin "DJ Beats" Bates works in a bowling alley, and Steven "Steves" Green is still based in the Brentford flats. However, their dead-end lives are changed when Chabud "Chabuddy G" Gul announces the news that their song, "Heart Monitor Riddem", has found phenomenal success in Japan on a popular game show. Furthermore, the company responsible for the show wishes to invite them to Japan for a record deal. With this in mind, the crew reconcile and travel to Japan. Miche, Grindah's wife, later joins the crew after obtaining a ticket.

In Japan, the Kurupt FM crew are assigned a manager, Taka, and a translator, Miki. The introduction of Taka proves antagonistic for Chabuddy, who notices Taka trying to replace him as their manager, which is further proved when he is ejected from a club. With Steves' eccentric behaviour and Miki acting as a weed dealer for him, the two become very close. While in Tokyo, the company plans Kurupt FM's debut to the Japanese audience, with a concert featuring them planned within a week of them arriving and a record deal. However, the exact terms and conditions regarding their deal are unknown, as Chabuddy deleted the email regarding the small print.

The Kurupt FM crew's first day in action proves disappointing. Instead of visiting a recording studio as they anticipated, the crew are led to a dance studio to perform a dance commonly featured on the game show, associated with their song, much to their chagrin. After being covertly manipulated by Taka, Grindah insists to the crew that the dances are necessary and are needed for their success in Japan.

Later on, the crew go for a photo shoot in their outfits for the concert, and it becomes clear that Taka is publicising Grindah as more important than the rest of the members, prompting an argument within the crew. During dinner with Miche and Taka, a jealous Chabuddy breaks in and berates Grindah for choosing Taka over him, offering Grindah an ultimatum between him or Taka. Grindah refuses to acknowledge the situation, leaving Chabuddy defeated.

The feud between Beats and Grindah comes to a climax when they are expected to appear on the game show under their new stage name "Bang Boys". Shortly before the show, Beats lambasts Grindah for not sticking to their garage roots and accuses him of selling out. This results in a scuffle between Beats and Grindah, leaving the latter in tears and the rest of the crew abandoning him. Grindah appears solo on the game show, feeling humiliated as he watches himself fail on the obstacle courses and later on with a disastrous recording session with a J-pop artist.

Meanwhile, Steves has become attracted to Miki but struggles to express his feelings for her. A drunk Chabuddy buys rounds for Japanese salarymen, thinking he is spending Taka's money, until he discovers from Yuta the barman that Taka's tab has been closed. Having spent several hundred pounds on drinks, Chabuddy flees from the hotel to avoid paying and is left homeless.

The day of the concert arrives, and only Grindah is there to perform. His nervousness from not having his former crew around and him realising that he has led himself astray from his roots leads him to lock himself in the bathroom. When Chabuddy G arrives after tracking a Bang Boys van to the concert, Grindah has fled. When the Bang Boys' turn on stage arrives, Chabuddy and Miki convince Taka's managers that he knows the dance routine and promptly leave.

What is left of Kurupt FM crew are sulking in a karaoke bar. Suddenly, Grindah enters and reaffirms his friendship with Beats, saying it is the "best thing to happen" to him. The rest of the gang arrive and do an emotional karaoke performance to "Heart Monitor Riddem", whilst Taka embarrasses himself at the concert. During the credits, Kurupt FM is set to release their first album, Miche is looking to publish a book, and Steves and Miki become domestic partners. However, it is unknown how Steves will return to England.

== Cast ==
- Allan Mustafa as Anthony "MC Grindah" Zografos
- Hugo Chegwin as Kevin "DJ Beats" Bates
- Asim Chaudhry as Chabud "Chabuddy G" Gul
- Steve Stamp as Steven "Steves" Green
- Dan Sylvester as Decoy
- Lily Brazier as Michelle "Miche" Zografos (née Coleman)
- George Keywood as Craig
- Hitomi Souno as Miki
- Ken Yamamura as Taka
- Nero Huang as Yuta
- Ruth Bratt as Roche
- Olivia Jasmine Edwards as Angel Zografos

== Production ==
On 28 November 2019, it was announced that a film adaptation of the television sitcom People Just Do Nothing was in production with the original cast returning and Jack Clough directing.

Filming began on 28 November 2019 in Japan and the United Kingdom, lasting for six weeks.

Filming in Japan took place mainly in the Tokyo area, and the crew displayed Kurupt FM stickers throughout the Tokyo filming locations. Some filming also took place in Griffin Park in the UK. The first official image of the cast in Japan was released on 28 November 2019.

In June 2020, it was announced that the film's release date of 28 August 2020 had been delayed to 5 February 2021, which was again moved to 13 August 2021. On 12 May 2021, the first trailer was released and a release date of 18 August 2021 given for the film.

== Home media ==
People Just Do Nothing: Big in Japan was released on Blu-ray and DVD on 22 November 2021 by Universal Pictures Home Entertainment (through Warner Bros. Home Entertainment) in the United Kingdom.

== Reception ==
On Rotten Tomatoes, the film has an approval rating of 82% based on 17 reviews, with an average rating of 6.5/10. Kevin Maher of The Times gave the film 2/5 and was concerned about the Japanese stereotypes - "Eventually it starts to feel like lowest-common-denominator humour". The Guardian gave it 3 out 5 commenting "The result is an amiable if unambitious showbiz satire, somewhere between The Office and Spinal Tap although not as groundbreaking as either". Bob Mann of One Mann's Movies reflected the views of someone who has not seen the TV version, something that he comments will be key to the box office success of the movie. Giving the movie 3.5 out of 5, he commented that "as a PJDN virgin, I still laughed a lot!".
