= Peacock (TV series) =

British comedy television series

- Screenplay by: Steve Stamp; Ben Murray
- Directed by: Freddie Waters
- Starring: Allan Mustafa
- Country of origin: United Kingdom
- Original language: English
- No. of series: 2
- No. of episodes: 9

Production
- Executive producers: Kenton Allen; Saurabh Kakkar; Matthew Justice; Seb Barwell; Ben Murray; Steve Stamp; Stephen Walker
- Producer: Lara Singer
- Cinematography: Charlie Goodger
- Editor: Gareth Heal
- Production companies: Big Talk Studios; Bullion Productions

Original release
- Network: BBC Three
- Release: 25 April 2022 – 18 June 2024

Peacock is a British television comedy series starring Allan Mustafa, written by Steve Stamp and Ben Murray. The first series of three episodes aired from 25 April 2022. The second series premiered on 18 June 2024.

== Synopsis ==
Andy Peacock (Mustafa) is a personal trainer who suffers a crisis of confidence when he is passed-up for a promotion at his gym. He sets up a class to encourage body positivity at the gym.

== Cast and characters ==
- Allan Mustafa as Andy Peacock
- Thomas Gray as Spooner
- Lucien Laviscount as Jay
- Susan Wokoma as Liz (series 1)
- Callie Cooke as Carly
- Mandeep Dhillon as Georgia
- Sophia Di Martino as Blue
- Steve Stamp as Jonathan
- Saffron Hocking as Kara
- Pippa Haywood as Teresa
- Anushka Chakravarti as Priya
- Jaz Hutchins as Mani
- Henry Perryment as Paddy
- Jonathan Livingstone as Nathan
- Jo Joyner as Eunice (series 2)
- Kimberley Nixon as Beatrice (series 2)
- James Quinn as Del
- Myriam Acharki as Naza
- Hugo Chegwin as Dave
- Kirsty Rider as Claudia

== Production ==
The series was created by Steve Stamp and Ben Murray, who previously worked together on People Just Do Nothing. The role of Andy Peacock was initially played by Dominic Cooper in a 2018 pilot for Sky One, directed by Stamp and Murray and produced by Big Talk Studios.

Allan Mustafa was announced in the lead role on the project in August 2021, with BBC Comedy commissioning episodes through Big Talk Studios. Stamp said the show had evolved from being about toxic masculinity to include changing modern attitudes. Stamp had recommended Allan Mustafa for the role of Andy Peacock having previously worked together on People Just Do Nothing, as well as the Ben Murray directed Kurrupt FM videos for YouTube.

In May 2023 the series was renewed for a second series of six episodes by the BBC. Shown in June/July 2024, the second series also features Jo Joyner and Kimberley Nixon.

In 2025, it was announced that the series has been cancelled.

== Broadcast ==
The series was first broadcast in the UK on 25 April 2022 on BBC Three. BBC Three began airing series two on 18 June 2024.

== Reception ==
The series received four stars in The Guardian with the character of Andy Peacock being compared with Alan Partridge and David Brent. Gerard Gilbert in the i felt the comparison with David Brent was appropriate but the main character “lacks Ricky Gervais's towering talent for pathos. Peacock seems more of an irredeemable berk”. The Daily Telegraph mentioned that the "atmosphere in the gym [is] a recognisable blend of right-on accessibility and clenched testosterone" but felt that the “fine supporting cast feel a little short-changed by thin characterisation”.

=== Accolades ===
Allan Mustafa won the Best Performance in a Comedy Award at the RTS North West Awards in 2022.
