= Matthew Cottle =

English actor

- Born: 16 February 1967 (age 59); Henley-on-Thames, Oxfordshire, England
- Occupation: Actor
- Children: 2

Matthew Cottle (born 16 February 1967) is an English film, stage, radio and television actor.

== Early life ==
Cottle was born in Henley-on-Thames, Oxfordshire, and studied drama at the Royal Academy of Dramatic Art, graduating in 1990 with an Acting (RADA Diploma).

== Film ==
Cottle appeared in Richard Attenborough's 1992 Chaplin (as Stan Laurel), and in David Jones' 1999 adaptation of A Christmas Carol. Cottle also appeared in The Personal History of David Copperfield in 2019.

== Theatre ==
Cottle's recent theatre work includes The Deep Blue Sea and The Chalk Garden at Chichester Festival Theatre, Wonderland at the Nottingham Playhouse, How the Other Half Loves at the Haymarket Theatre and the Duke of York's, Our Country's Good, A Small Family Business The Habit of Art at the National Theatre and Quartermaine's Terms, directed by Richard Eyre, at Wyndham's Theatre. Cottle also appeared in A Chorus of Disapproval, directed by Trevor Nunn (Harold Pinter Theatre), and Comic Potential, directed by Alan Ayckbourn (Lyric Theatre).

Other theatre roles include Communicating Doors Menier Chocolate Factory, Neighbourhood Watch (in Scarborough and New York), Racing Demon (Sheffield Crucible), Taking Steps (Orange Tree, Richmond), What the Women Did at the Southwark Playhouse and several tours and seasons at repertory theatres up and down the country.

== Television ==
Cottle has appeared as a regular in a number of television series, including Murder on the Blackpool Express, two series of The Windsors for Channel 4, three series as Martin in BBC Two's flat-share sitcom Game On, and four series of Citizen Khan. He has also appeared as a regular in several other series, including Fried, Get Well Soon, A Perfect State and Life Begins.

Cottle has also appeared in many other TV shows, including Endeavour for ITV, Defending the Guilty for BBC2, Outlander for Amazon Prime, Pure for Channel 4, Plebs for ITV 2, Unforgotten for ITV, The Dresser, Channel 4's Man Down, Dave's comedy series Hoff the Record,The Job Lot, Holby City, Doctors, Pramface and The Responder.

== Personal life ==
He is an Arsenal supporter and has two children, a daughter, Hannah, born in 1997 and a son, Harry, born in 2000.

== Filmography ==
=== Film ===
Year	Title	Role	Notes
1992	Chaplin	Stan Laurel	
2008	Blessed	Policeman #2	
2014	National Theatre Live: A Small Family Business	Benedict Hough	
2015	Two Down	The Banker	
2019	The Personal History of David Copperfield	Mr Spenlow	
2023	The Critic	Graham Meadows	
2024	The Nun Slayer	Donald Peartree	Short
2024	Seize Them!	Alric the Painter	
2025	By the Throat	Dr. Lewis	

=== Television ===
Year	Title	Role	Notes
1991	Miss Marple	Ernie Gregg	Episode: "They Do It With Mirrors"
1991	Taking the Floor	Brian Wheeler	6 episodes
1992	Casualty	PC Naughton	Episode: "Body and Soul"
1994	Drop the Dead Donkey	PC Dean	Episode: "Strike"
1995 - 1998	Game On	Martin Henson	18 episodes
1997	A Perfect State	Malcolm	7 episodes
1997	Get Well Soon	Roy Osborne	6 episodes
1998	The Bill	Simon Heath	Episode: "Unlicenced"
1999	A Christmas Carol	Dick Wilkins	TV movie
2001	The Infinite Worlds of H.G. Wells	Whittaker	6 episodes (mini-series)
2003	Down to Earth	David	Episode: "Honesty"
2003	Holby City	Alan Knox	Episode: "House of Cards"
2004	Doctors	Miles Fordham	Episode: "Over the Fence"
2004 - 2006	Life Begins	Nick	2 episodes
2005	The Commander	DC Gareth Buckley	Episode: "Virus"
2006	EastEnders	Duncan	1 episode
2007	Spooks	Alex Smith	Episode: "The Virus (Part 2)"
2008	Doctors	Donald Pegram	Episode: "The Man Who Wasn't There"
2008	Holby City	William Middlebrook	Episode: "Or I'll Never Fall in Love"
2011	Doctors	Graham Moodie	Episode: "Grin and Bear It"
2013 - 2016	Citizen Khan	Dave	16 episodes
2014	The Job Lot	Peter McCrea	1 episode
2014	Pramface	Hugh (uncredited)	Episode: "Enchanted Picnic"
2014	Doctors	Peter Day	Episode: "Scullery Boy"
2015	Fried	Derek Wom	6 episodes
2015	Man Down	Peter	Episode: "Dennis"
2015	Hoff the Record	Frank Evans	Episode: "Hostile Environment Training"
2015	The Dresser	Albany	TV movie
2015	Unforgotten	Liam Gough	3 episodes
2016	Plebs	Terrence	Episode: "The New Master"
2016 - 2023	The Windsors	Prince Edward	14 episodes
2017	Murder on the Blackpool Express	George	TV movie
2018 - 2019	Defending the Guilty	Ronald	2 episodes
2019	Endeavour	Jeff Slayton	Episode: "Apollo"
2019	Pure	Angus	2 episodes
2019	Traitors	Norman Pitman	Episode: "Feef"
2020	Bridgerton	Featherington Doctor	Episode: "After the Rain"
2020	Outlander	Hubert Shertson	Episode: "The Ballad of Roger Mac"
2022	Life After Life	Mr. Carver	2 episodes
2022	Pistol	Reginald Bosanquet	3 episodes (mini-series)
2022 - 2024	The Responder	Father Liam Neeson	5 episodes
2024	Alice & Jack	Vicar	Episode: "2"
