= Asim Chaudhry =

British comedian and actor (born 1986)

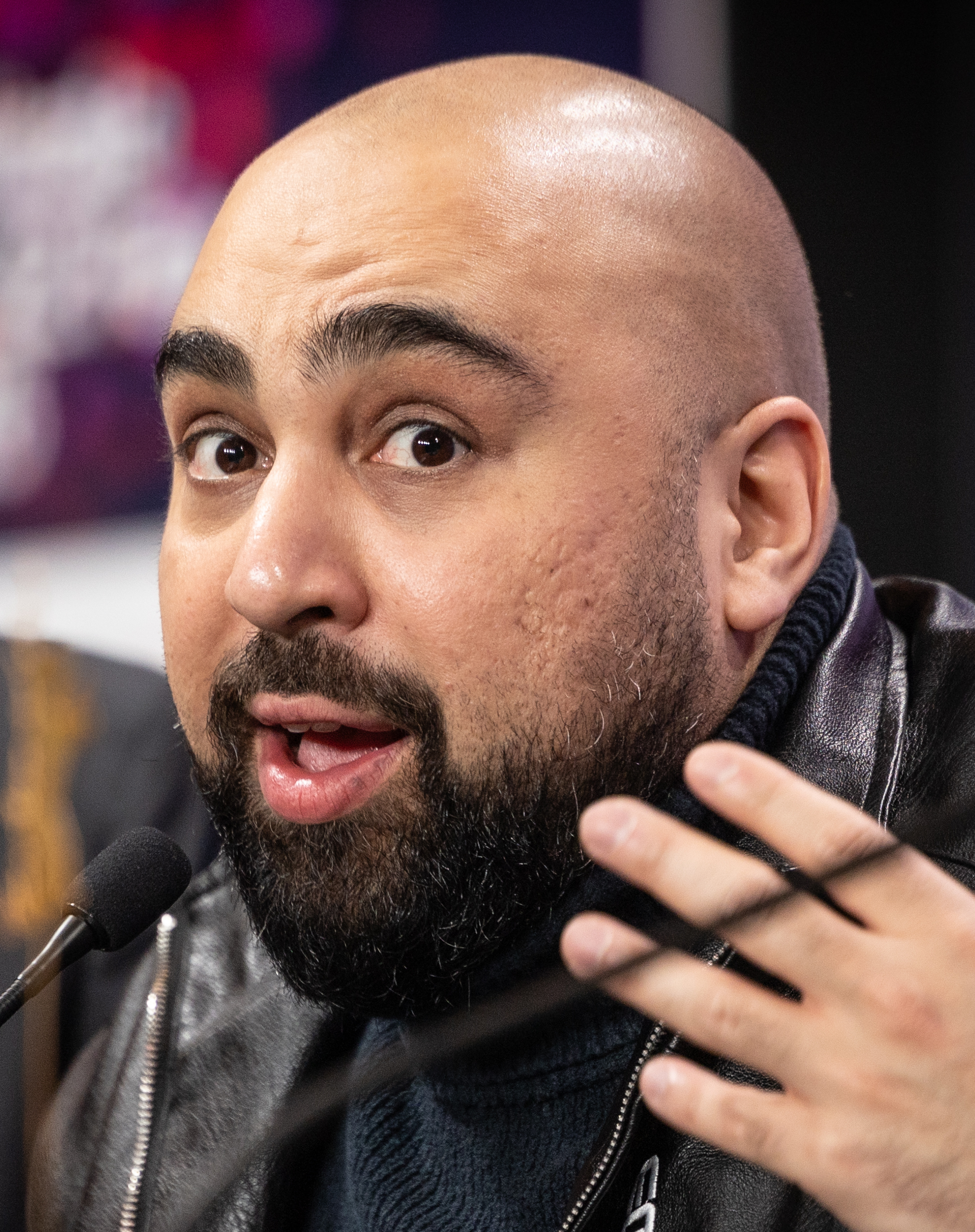
- Chaudhry in 2026
- Born: 24 November 1986 (age 39); Hounslow, London, England
- Occupations: Comedian; actor
- Years active: 2010–present
- Known for: People Just Do Nothing

Asim Chaudhry (born 24 November 1986) is a British comedian, writer, director, rapper and actor best known for playing Chabud "Chabuddy G" Gul in the BBC mockumentary series People Just Do Nothing, which he co-created. For this role, he won a Royal Television Society Award and was nominated for two British Academy Television Awards.

In 2015 and 2016, Chaudhry starred in the mockumentary Hoff the Record alongside David Hasselhoff. In 2018, Chaudhry appeared in series six of the panel show Taskmaster and starred in the television film Click & Collect alongside Stephen Merchant.

At college, Chaudhry met Hugo Chegwin, Steve Stamp, and Allan Mustafa, with whom he created YouTube mockumentary videos about a fictional pirate radio station. This led to the group being commissioned for People Just Do Nothing. Chaudhry also authored How To Be a Man under the name Chabuddy G, and the group produced music as Kurupt FM. Chaudhry wrote and directed the short film Love Pool, and has appeared in Happy New Year, Colin Burstead, Wonder Woman 1984 and Black Mirror: Bandersnatch.

== Early life ==
Asim Chaudhry was born on 24 November 1986 to a Punjabi Muslim family of hereditary Chaudhries in Hounslow, London. Both his parents hail from Pakistan; his mother is from Karachi, and his father is from Lahore.

Chaudhry attended Islamic summer schools during his childhood. In high school, Chaudhry made a play parodying the 1972 crime film The Godfather, called The Poppadom Father. On a media studies course at college, he met Hugo Chegwin, Steve Stamp, and Allan Mustafa. The group made a series of YouTube mockumentaries, filmed by Chaudhry, based on their experiences as DJs on a pirate radio station in London. The mockumentaries were seen by Ash Atalla, producer of the mockumentary series The Office, and Atalla commissioned the group to make the BBC Three series People Just Do Nothing. Chaudhry is a lifelong supporter of Newcastle United.

== Career ==
=== People Just Do Nothing ===
Chaudhry co-created and starred in People Just Do Nothing, a BBC mockumentary sitcom which premiered in 2014. The series is largely improvised. Chaudhry plays Chabuddy G, a failed entrepreneur with high ambitions who manages the group Kurupt FM. The character is partially based on Chaudhry's father. The programme ended in 2018 after five series, as the group found it increasingly difficult to come up with new ideas. A film, People Just Do Nothing: Big in Japan, was released in 2021. A US remake is planned, in which Chaudhry will serve as an executive producer.

Chaudhry won a 2017 Royal Television Society Award for Best Comedy Performance. He was nominated for two British Academy Television Awards for Best Male Comedy Performance, in 2017 and 2018. The show also won awards for Best Scripted Comedy at the 2017 BAFTAs and 2017 RTS Awards.

Chaudhry, Hugo Chegwin, Steve Stamp, and Allan Mustafa also perform as the group Kurupt FM. Their single "Heart Monitor Riddem" was released in 2016 after featuring in People Just Do Nothing, and a music video shot by Chaudhry was released in 2018. Kurupt FM were signed to independent music label XL Recordings. Their single "Suttin Like That" was released in October 2017, and their mixtape The Lost Tapes was released in November 2017. Chaudhry has also released a comedy book, How to Be a Man, under the name Chabuddy G.

=== Film ===
In 2016, Chaudhry starred in the short film Donald Mohammed Trump as Donald Trump. The black comedy shows Trump inexplicably turning into an Asian man before a Republican Party rally. Though Chaudhry watched hours of Trump speaking in preparation, he was told by the director to instead play Trump as "a real person", so that the film could focus on the politics of the situation rather than Trump himself. Chaudhry also appeared in the comedy film Chubby Funny, about two struggling London actors, in which he played a corner shop owner.

In February 2018, the 17-minute short film Love Pool was released, which Chaudhry wrote and directed. In Love Pool, single man Mark meets a woman while carpooling with the service Uber. The film was Chaudhry's directorial debut, produced by DMC Film and released on the app Vero. It was inspired by a dinner party in which Chaudhry felt pressure from his friends to settle down, and by his carpooling experiences. Chaudhry plays the taxi driver, imagining the character as the "pissed off, sour, bitter cousin" of Chabuddy G—his character in People Just Do Nothing. The film won the 2018 People's Choice Award at Thunderdance, an independent film festival in London.

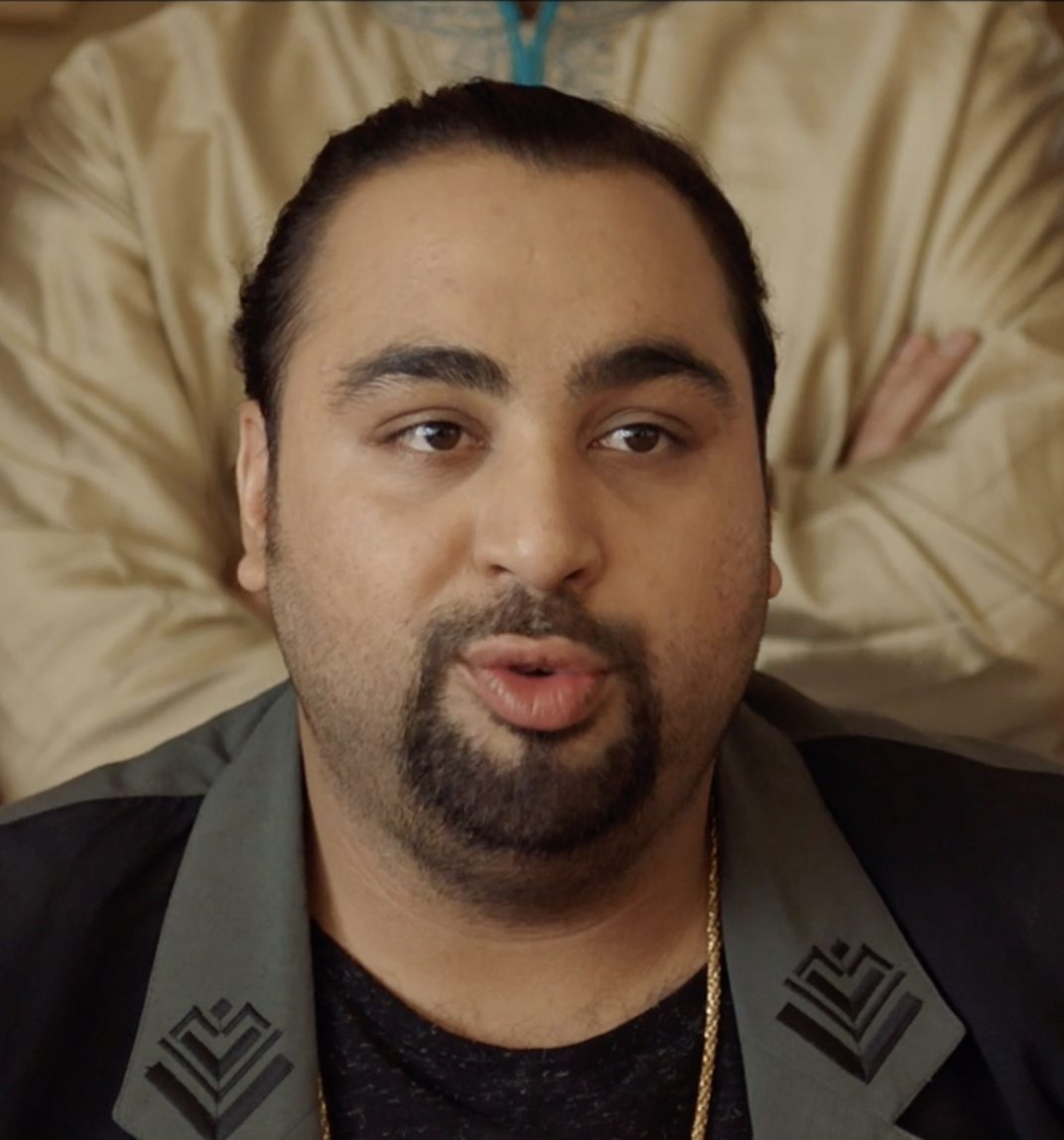
Chaudhry in 2019

In 2018, Chaudhry appeared in the comedy film Eaten by Lions, which is about half-brothers Omar and Pete who search for Omar's estranged father after their parents are eaten by lions. It premiered at the Edinburgh International Film Festival in June 2018. In a three-star review, Steve Bennett of Chortle called Chaudhry a "scene-stealer".

On 24 December 2018, Chaudhry starred alongside Stephen Merchant in the BBC One television film Click & Collect, with a runtime of 53 minutes. The pair play Dev and Andrew, respectively, who travel 300 miles (480 km) on a road trip on Christmas Eve to buy Andrew's daughter a Christmas present. Chaudhry took inspiration for Dev from a former neighbour who recognised him from the television and waved at Chaudhry when he was in the kitchen, which he could see from his living room window. Adam Starkey of Metro and Jasper Rees of The Telegraph gave the film four out of five stars. Rees commented that Chaudhry performed as Dev like "slipping into an old coat". Starkey praised the actors for "convincing, likeable performances" and wrote that Dev "takes the natural course from irritatingly vibrant neighbour to having a sympathetic, misunderstood circumstance for his enthusiasm".

In 2018, Chaudhry appeared in the Ben Wheatley black comedy Happy New Year, Colin Burstead, playing Sham. The film had a limited release at film festivals before airing on BBC Two on 30 December; a BBC television series spin-off is planned for 2019. Neil Maskell stars as Colin Burstead, who hires a manor for a New Year celebration with his extended family. Sham is an estranged character who wallows in sorrow. Stephen Dalton of The Hollywood Reporter criticised Chaudhry's character as one of several whose secondary subplots detract from the film.

Chaudhry appeared in the interactive film Black Mirror: Bandersnatch, which was released on Netflix on 28 December 2018. Part of the science fiction anthology series Black Mirror, Bandersnatch allows the viewer to make choices that affect the resultant story. Most storylines involve the young programmer Stefan adapting a book into an adventure game and descending into madness. Chaudhry stars as Mohan Thakur, the founder of the video game company Tuckersoft. The film received a mostly positive critical reception. Chaudhry received racist comments following the episode, but said of the online response that "99.9% of the stuff is positive and lovely". He commented that he and his friends have all played through the film multiple times.

In 2022, Chaudhry was cast in Duke Johnson's film The Actor, based on the novel Memory by Donald E. Westlake. In 2023, he played Teefs in Guardians of the Galaxy Vol. 3.

In 2025 Chaudhry appeared as "Scott" in the Gore Verbinski directed Good Luck, Have Fun, Don't Die

=== Television ===
Chaudhry appeared in the mockumentary Hoff the Record, which aired for twelve episodes on Dave in 2015 and 2016. The programme follows David Hasselhoff as he struggles to find work in the UK, with Chaudhry playing his driver. The show won an International Emmy Award for Best Comedy Series in 2016. In a four-star review of the first episode for The Telegraph, Michael Hogan called Chaudhry "the standout among the supporting cast".

In 2017, Chaudhry appeared on the quiz show Celebrity Mastermind, finishing third of four. In April 2018, he appeared in an episode of Rob Beckett's Playing for Time, in which Rob Beckett plays a series of video games with his guest. In May 2018, Chaudhry played Arnab in the Channel 4 sitcom High & Dry. The six-episode series is about a group of people who survive a plane crash, and was filmed in the Seychelles.

Chaudhry was a contestant on the sixth series of Dave panel show Taskmaster; the episodes premiered between May and July 2018. Taskmaster challenges its panellists to complete humorous and absurd tasks, such as "bring in the best liquid". The sixth series featured Chaudhry alongside Alice Levine, Liza Tarbuck, Russell Howard, and Tim Vine; it set record ratings for the programme, with an average viewership of 900,000. (Note: Average calculated from BARB's 28-day four screen viewership figures, excluding episode 7, for which data is not available. Ratings are (in thousands): 214, 886, 942, 830, 749, 730, 795, 875, 1090 (average 901). See List of Taskmaster episodes#Series 6 (2018).) Sam Wollaston of The Guardian called Chaudhry "absolutely hopeless at everything, but hilariously and very likably so".

In 2018, Chaudhry appeared on chat shows The Jonathan Ross Show and The One Show, with the latter appearance in a Christmas special. In 2019, Chaudhry appeared on the first episode of The Lateish Show with Mo Gilligan. That year, he and Will Poulter presented Lee Mack with the Best Entertainment Performance award at the BAFTA TV awards for Would I Lie to You.

Chaudhry played Abel in the television adaptation of Neil Gaiman's comic series The Sandman. Chaudhry was not previously familiar with the comics, but fans found he bears a striking resemblance to Abel. Bethy Squire of Vulture praised Chaudhry's acting, saying he brought the right "pathos and softboy energy" to the character.

In 2023, Chaudhry guest starred in The Cleaner, a sitcom about crime scene cleaning. He described his character Kai as "a conspiracy theorist with a good heart". The series was created by and stars Greg Davies, whom Chaudhry had worked with on Taskmaster.

The same year, Chaudhry played a role in series 8, episode 4 of the BBC comedy-horror anthology Inside No. 9 episode "Love Is a Stranger". Chaudhry's character—Jai—is a friendly man on a virtual dating service who suffers from the social stigma of facial disfigurement. Jai is later revealed to have been lured in by the pickup artist community. The episode was rated five stars by The Times.

In November 2023, it was announced by Paramount+ that Chaudhry would star in a new original drama series Stags, filming on location in Tenerife and due to be released in 2024.

=== Other ===
Chaudhry appears in British Airways' safety video as Director Chabuddy G. and in Riz Ahmed's album The Long Goodbye, also as Chabuddy G.

== Personal life ==
Growing up in Feltham, West London, Chaudhry was subjected to racist abuse, including physical abuse by members of the National Front. This led him to suppress and feel ashamed of his culture as a child, until he encountered South Asian cinema and poetry in secondary school. As of 2025, he still lives in London.

Chaudhry married Sevan, a therapist, in 2021. They first met through a mutual friend on Facebook in 2013. In 2026, they welcomed a son.

== Filmography ==
=== Film ===
Film credits for Asim Chaudhry
Year	Title	Role	Notes
2014	Paddington	Security Guard	Uncredited role
2016	Donald Mohammed Trump	Donald Trump	Short film
2016	Chubby Funny	Arash	
2017	British Airways Safety Video: Director's Cut	Safety-Video Director	Short film
2018	Love Pool	Taxi Pool Driver Ali	Short film; also writer and director
2018	Eaten by Lions	Irfan	Starring role
2018	Happy New Year, Colin Burstead	Sham	
2018	Black Mirror: Bandersnatch	Mohan Thakur	Interactive film; starring role
2019	Greed	Frank the Lion Tamer	
2020	Wonder Woman 1984	Roger (Co-Worker)	
2021	People Just Do Nothing: Big in Japan	Chabuddy G	
2021	The Electrical Life of Louis Wain	Herbert Railton	
2022	What's Love Got to Do with It?	Mo	
2022	The Honeymoon	Bav	
2023	Guardians of the Galaxy Vol. 3	Teefs the Walrus (voice)	
2023	Barbie	Warehouse Employee	
2023	Listen Up!	Onkel Ji	Original title Hør her'a!
2024	The Night Before Christmas in Wonderland	March Hare	
2025	Picture This	Sid	
2025	The Actor	Various	
2025	Good Luck, Have Fun, Don't Die	Scott	
2025	Tinsel Town	Danny	
2025	David	King Achish	Voice role

=== Television ===
Television credits for Asim Chaudhry
Year	Title	Role	Notes
2012	Comedy Feeds	Chabuddy G	Series 1; Episode 7: "People Just Do Nothing" (Pilot for series)
2014	Cuckoo	Waiter	Series 2; Episode 7: "Christmas Special"
2014–2018	People Just Do Nothing	Chabuddy G	Starring role; Series 1–5 (27 episodes); also creator
2015	W1A	Security Guard 1	Series 2; Episode 1
2015	Comedy Blaps	Arnab	Series 5; Episode 7: "High & Dry Blap"
2015	Peter and Wendy	Mullins, Johnson	Television film
2015–2016	Hoff the Record	Terry Patel	Starring role; Series 1 & 2 (12 episodes)
2016	Stan Lee's Lucky Man	Syed	Series 1; Episode 2: "Win Some, Lose Some"
2016	Morgana Robinson's The Agency	Trevor	Episode 2
2017	Sounds Like Friday Night	Chabuddy G	Series 1; Episode 1
2017	Celebrity Mastermind	Himself - Contestant	Series 16; Episode 4
2018	High & Dry	Arnab	Starring role; Episodes 1–6
2018	Taskmaster	Himself - Contestant	Series 6; Episodes 1–10
2018	Click & Collect	Dev D'Cruz	Television film; starring role
2019	The Big Fat Quiz of the Year	Himself - Contestant	Television Special
2020	Hitmen	Charles	Series 1 (4 episodes)
2021	I Literally Just Told You	Himself - Contestant	Series 1; Episode 3: "Celebrity"
2022–2025	The Sandman	Abel	6 episodes
2023	The Cleaner	Kai	Series 2; Episode 3: "The Night Shift"
2023	Inside No. 9	Jai	Series 8; Episode 4: "Love Is a Stranger"
2024	Inside No. 9	Party Guest	Series 9; Episode 6: "Plodding On"
2024	The Traitors: The Movie	Jaz Singh	Television film for Comic Relief: Funny for Money
2024	Stags	Greg	Episodes 1 & 2: "The Bath" and "The Chicken"
2024	Industry	Vinay Sarkar	Series 3; Episodes 4 & 8: "White Mischief" and "Infinite Largesse"
2024	Person of Interest	Shakil Khan	Television film
2024–2025	The Completely Made-Up Adventures of Dick Turpin	Craig the Warlock	6 episodes
2025	Black Mirror	Mohan Thakur	Episode: "Plaything"
2026	Dirty Business	Mickey	3 episodes
2026	Death Valley	Omar Sahni	Series 2, episode 4
2026	The Reluctant Vampire	Igon	6 episodes
TBA	The Siege	TBA	Upcoming drama series

== Awards and nominations ==
Awards and nominations received by Asim Chaudhry
Year	Award	Category	Work	Result	Ref
2017	BAFTA Television Awards	Best Male Comedy Performance	People Just Do Nothing	Nominated	
2017	Royal Television Society Awards	Best Comedy Performance	People Just Do Nothing	Won	
2018	BAFTA Television Awards	Best Male Comedy Performance	People Just Do Nothing	Nominated	

== Bibliography ==
- G, Chabuddy (2018). How to Be a Man. HarperCollins. ISBN 9780008314217.
