= Imran Yusuf =

Kenyan-British comedian (born 1979)

- Born: 26 November 1979 (age 46); Mombasa, Kenya

Comedy career
- Years active: 2003–present
- Medium: Stand-up, Television
- Genre: Observational comedy
- Subjects: Racism, Relationships, Islamophobia
- Website: www.imranyusuf.com

Imran Yusuf (Konkani: इम्रान यूसुफ़; born 26 November 1979) is a Kenyan-born British stand-up comedian of Indian Konkani Muslim descent, who has appeared on various British radio and TV comedy shows.

== Early life and career ==
Yusuf was born in Mombasa, Kenya to ethnic Indian parents of Konkani Muslim origin, and grew up in London. His family became refugees following the expulsion of Asians from Uganda by Idi Amin in 1972.

He initially worked in the video game industry. He worked on the development for several Midway Games titles such as Spy Hunter. He also worked on Championship Manager.

== Comedy career ==
Imran Yusuf first performed in 2000 at a comedy show hosted by comedian Jeff Mirza. He started his full-time career in comedy in 2003 after quitting the video game industry. He won a stand-up competition at Newbury Comedy Festival in 2004. In 2010, he appeared at the Edinburgh Festival Fringe in 2010 with his first solo show An Audience with Imran Yusuf receiving positive reviews and a nomination from the Foster's Edinburgh Comedy Awards for the best newcomer. 2010 saw Yusuf appearing on Michael McIntyre's Comedy Roadshow as well as debuting on the BBC Radio 7's satirical news comments The Now Show on Boxing Day of that year. In February 2011, he appeared on BBC Radio 4's The News Quiz and also on BBC Two's How TV Ruined Your Life, together with Charlie Brooker. His UK tour An Audience with Imran Yusuf started in February 2011 as well at London's Soho Theatre. Later that year, he made a debut on Arthur Smith's Balham Bash on BBC Radio 4.

In 2011, BBC America Yusuf's stand-up was a part of Funny As Hell, a stand-up series presenting British comedy in the United States. Also in 2011, Yusuf performed with a show called Bring The Thunder at the Edinburgh Fringe. In 2012, The Imran Yusuf Show was broadcast on the BBC. In 2015, Yusuf starred as Ed in the series Fried; two years later, he appeared as Sid in the romantic comedy film Finding Fatimah.

His comedy was accused of being sexist.

== Television credits ==
- Yuk Yuk's Great Canadian Laugh Off (2009)
- Laughtershock (2010)
- Edinburgh Comedy Fest Live (2010)
- Edinburgh Comedy Gala (2010)
- Michael McIntyre's Comedy Roadshow - series 2 (2010)
- BBC Comedy Presents: Free@TheFringe (2011)
- Edinburgh Comedy Gala (2011)
- How TV Ruined Your Life (2011)
- The Imran Yusuf Show (2012)
- Ultimate Brain (2014–2016)
- Fried (2015)

== Filmography ==
- Finding Fatimah (2017) - Sid
- Aladdin (2019) - Omar (deleted scene)
