= Love Wedding Repeat =

2020 film by Dean Craig

- Release poster
- Directed by: Dean Craig
- Screenplay by: Dean Craig
- Based on: Plan de Table by Francis Nief and Christelle Raynal
- Produced by: Piers Tempest; Guglielmo Marchetti
- Starring: Sam Claflin; Olivia Munn; Eleanor Tomlinson; Joel Fry; Tim Key; Aisling Bea; Jack Farthing; Allan Mustafa; Freida Pinto
- Cinematography: Hubert Taczanowski
- Edited by: Christian Sandino-Taylor
- Production companies: Notorious Pictures; Tempo Productions
- Distributed by: Netflix
- Release date: 10 April 2020
- Running time: 100 minutes
- Countries: United Kingdom; Italy
- Language: English

Love Wedding Repeat is a 2020 romantic comedy film written and directed by Dean Craig, in his feature directorial debut. A remake of the 2012 French romantic comedy film Plan de Table, the film stars Sam Claflin, Olivia Munn and Eleanor Tomlinson.

In the film, Jack is trying to make his sister Hayley's wedding day go smoothly, as neither of their parents are living, but finds himself juggling his angry ex-girlfriend, an uninvited guest with a secret about Hayley, a misplaced sleep sedative, and a woman he has been pining for for years in alternate versions of the same day.

The film was released on Netflix on 10 April 2020 and was mostly poorly received by critics.

== Plot ==
While in Rome visiting his sister Hayley, Jack tries to muster up the courage to kiss her roommate Dina before returning to London. However, they are interrupted by his old schoolmate Greg, and after Jack and Dina awkwardly say their goodbyes, a frustrated Jack leaves with Greg.

Three years later, Jack is at Hayley's wedding. She informs him that Dina has come to the wedding and is newly single. After the ceremony, Jack and Dina meet for the first time in three years. They admit that they used to ask Hayley about one another.

Marc, Hayley's former school classmate, arrives uninvited while high on cocaine, confessing his love for her. She demands that he leave, but her husband Roberto appears and invites Marc to stay for the celebrations. Hayley asks Jack to drug Marc with her sleeping drops and he reluctantly agrees. Shortly after Jack places the drops into Marc's empty champagne glass, a group of children playfully rearrange the seating order. The narrator comments on the many variations eight people can sit at a table.

The drugged glass ends up with Bryan, the "maid of honour", who quickly drinks it all. While Jack and Dina reconnect, Marc blackmails Hayley by threatening to tell Roberto they had sex three weeks earlier. She again asks Jack to handle Marc, so he locks him in a cupboard. A sedated Bryan mumbles through his maid-of-honour speech before accidentally destroying the cake. The mayhem is exacerbated by the presence of Jack's vindictive ex-girlfriend and her current insecure, jealous boyfriend.

After a guest releases Marc from the cupboard, he grabs the microphone and exposes his affair with Hayley in front of all the guests. Upset, Roberto abandons Hayley, but when she tries to stop him, he accidentally falls over a balcony. The scene freezes as the narrator reminds the audience of how the wedding can be affected by endless seating arrangements. In fast-forward, the film depicts a number of alternate scenarios where different guests are drugged each time, all ending in chaos.

In the last scenario, Jack is finally seated beside Dina, though he is the one that ends up drugged. Unable to regurgitate the sedative, he asks Bryan to insert his fingers down his throat. Dina walks in on them, much to Jack's embarrassment. They try to move past it back at the table, but as she tearfully opens up about her mother's death, Jack struggles to stay awake, upsetting her.

Things soon begin to look up for Jack and the other guests. Bryan gives a successful speech, impressing Vitelli, an important film director also in attendance, and hooks up with another guest, his ex Rebecca. Following a conversation with Jack, Marc decides against exposing the affair. Instead, he wishes Hayley and Roberto the best and leaves.

As Dina is leaving the wedding due to a work emergency, Jack attempts to connect with her for the last time. She says that, although their feelings were mutual, they missed their moment and she leaves. Having finally landed an opportunity with Vitelli, Bryan inspires Jack to take chances when they come. He chases after Dina, catching her at the end of the street. They are nearly interrupted by a man passing by who claims to know Dina, but Jack turns him away and they finally kiss.

== Cast ==
- Sam Claflin as Jack
- Olivia Munn as Dina
- Eleanor Tomlinson as Hayley Carboni
- Joel Fry as Bryan
- Tim Key as Sidney
- Aisling Bea as Rebecca
- Jack Farthing as Marc Fisher
- Allan Mustafa as Chaz
- Freida Pinto as Amanda
- Paolo Mazzarelli as Frederico Vitelli
- Tiziano Caputo as Roberto Carboni
- Alexander Forsyth as Greg
- Francesca Rocco as Cristina
- Penny Ryder as the Oracle (narrator)

== Production ==
The film was announced in April 2019, with Sam Claflin, Olivia Munn, Freida Pinto and Eleanor Tomlinson cast. Filming began in Rome on 6 May.

== Release ==
In May 2019, Netflix acquired distribution rights to the film. The film was released on 10 April 2020.

== Reception ==
On the review aggregator website Rotten Tomatoes, the film holds an approval rating of 35% based on 68 reviews, with an average rating of 5/10. The website's critics consensus reads, "Love Wedding Repeat takes the rough shape of beloved rom-coms from the past, but its beautiful setting and appealing cast can't compensate for a sodden story." On Metacritic, which assigns a weighted average score out of 100 to reviews from mainstream critics, the film received an average score of 41, based on reviews from 17 critics, indicating "mixed or average" reviews.

Owen Gleiberman of Variety wrote: "It unfolds, more or less, in real time, which gives it an existential comedy-of-suspense element that trumps the usual Styrofoam rom-com plotting. The classical music playing in the background doesn't make the film stodgy; it creates a sustained operatic flow. And the actors are simply terrific." David Rooney of The Hollywood Reporter wrote: "There's just too little wit here amid all the cutesy misunderstandings and farcical mayhem to make Love Wedding Repeat anything but tedious froth."
