= Get Well Soon (TV series) =

- Genre: Comedy
- Written by: John Antrobus; Ray Galton
- Directed by: Christine Gernon
- Starring: Matthew Cottle; Eddie Marsan; Robert Bathurst; William Osborne; Michael Troughton
- Country of origin: United Kingdom
- Original language: English
- No. of series: 1
- No. of episodes: 6

Production
- Running time: 30 minutes

Original release
- Network: BBC1
- Release: 2 November – 7 December 1997

Get Well Soon is a 1997 BBC television comedy series starring Matthew Cottle and Eddie Marsan. Lasting only 6 episodes, it was about the everyday lives of a group of patients, doctors, nurses and other staff at a tuberculosis hospital in 1947. The show, aired weekly between 2 November and 7 December 1997, was based on the meeting of Ray Galton and Alan Simpson, the writers of Steptoe and Son, in a Tuberculosis sanatorium in 1947. Although given a prominent early Sunday evening slot, the series failed to capture the public's imagination and only ran for one series.

== Situation ==
One day in 1947, Roy Osborne (Matthew Cottle) is admitted to a TB sanatorium. He thinks he'll only be there for a few weeks, then finds that it could be several years before he can leave.

== Cast ==
- Matthew Cottle as Roy Osborne
- Eddie Marsan as Brian Clapton
- Anita Dobson as Mrs. Ivy Osborne
- Samantha Beckinsale as Mrs. Howell
- Patsy Rowlands as Mrs. Clapton
- Hugh Bonneville as Norman Tucker
- Robert Bathurst as Squadron Leader Fielding
- Michael Troughton as The Padre
- William Osborne as Jeffry Powell
- Kate O'Toole as Sister Shelley
- Julie Mullen as Lily

== Episodes ==
1. The New Arrival (2 November 1997)
2. Snowbound (9 November 1997)
3. Tucker's Gambit (16 November 1997)
4. Sons, Mothers, Lovers and Others (23 November 1997)
5. The Whist Drive (30 November 1997)
6. Poison Ivy (7 December 1997)

== Media releases ==
The complete series of Get Well Soon on DVD in one disc set was released by Simply Media on 21 September 2015.
