= Fried (2015 TV series) =

British television series

- Genre: Comedy
- Created by: Harry Williams; Jack Williams
- Written by: Harry Williams; Jack Williams
- Directed by: Patrick Conroy; Helen Fraser; Natalie Meth
- Starring: Katy Wix; Mandeep Dhillon; Matthew Cottle; William Melling; Imran Yusuf; Lorna Gayle; Jonathan Watson
- Country of origin: United Kingdom
- Original language: English
- No. of series: 1
- No. of episodes: 6

Production
- Executive producers: Harry Williams; Jack Williams; Phil Gilbert; Simon Wilson
- Producer: Sarah Hammond
- Editor: Fergus Mackinnon
- Running time: 30 minutes
- Production companies: Bwark Productions; Two Brothers Pictures

Original release
- Network: BBC Three
- Release: 25 August – 29 September 2015

Fried is a British sitcom that aired on BBC Three. The show stars Katy Wix, Mandeep Dhillon, Matthew Cottle, William Melling, Imran Yusuf and Lorna Gayle. It began airing on 25 August 2015, and ran for six episodes until 29 September 2015. A show pilot was aired on BBC iPlayer in 2014.

== Synopsis ==
Fried is focused on staff who work at a chicken shop in Croydon, Seriously Fried Chicken. Mary Fawn (Katy Wix) is the manager, much to the annoyance of her co-worker Derek Wom (Matthew Cottle) whose ambition of becoming a manager is thwarted by Mary's management. Other cast members include Amara (Mandeep Dhillon), who is only working there to earn money for her father; Joe (William Melling), who desperately wants the love of Amara; Ed (Imran Yusuf); and Shontal (Lorna Gayle).

== Cast ==
- Katy Wix as Mary Fawn
- Mandeep Dhillon as Amara
- Matthew Cottle as Derek Wom
- William Melling as Joe
- Imran Yusuf as Ed
- Lorna Gayle as Shontal
- Jonathan Watson as Clive Bagshawe
- Nicola Daley as Receptionist Angela
- Katrina Bryan as Margot
- Andrew Still as Noah
- Erin Armstrong as Jo Jo
- James Bachman as Gareth
- Elliot Hardy as Trevor
- Jonathan Pender as First hoodie
- Samuel Folayan as Second hoodie
- Christopher Barclay as disgruntled customer
- Kathryn Howden as Doctor
- Lois Chimimba as Sam (crocodile)
- John Clyde as Police officer
- Colin Little as Man in crocodile suit
- Nicole Cooper as Angry mother
- Sanjeev Kohli as Mike Fagins
- David Gallacher as Priest
- Vari Sylvester as Trevor's mother
- George Dochetry as Tony

== Episodes ==
No.	Title	Original release date	Prod. code
1	"Carlos from Spain"	25 August 2015	1.1
After finding out she has been reported to head office as a bad manager, Mary dresses up as 'Carlos' in an attempt to find out who it was. Meanwhile, Amara loses her job after causing a fire and is then left alone to deal with 'Drunk O' Clock' on her own.
2	"Hold Up"	1 September 2015	1.2
Mary and Joe are on the late shift, when a hoodie bursts in demanding nuggets. After being ashamed of her cowardly behaviour and some persuasion from Derek. Mary leaves Seriously Fried Chicken, and Derek is promoted to manager after bribing the Company boss with gifts. This is until, Mary pays a man to raid the shop again and returns to her role as manager.
3	"Poulet Etc"	8 September 2015	1.3
Business is low for Seriously Fried Chicken after a new stall is opened selling Poulet. Mary comes up with many ideas, in the end she burns down the stall in the middle of the night. Meanwhile, Joe begins dating Jo-Jo (Erin Armstrong) in a bid to impress Amara. After finding out that Jo-Jo is a psychopath, he struggles to break up with her.
4	"The Second Coming"	15 September 2015	1.4
After falling for a busker, Amara persuades Derek to relive his Rock band days and after finding out he can't get back his former band members, He forms a band with Amara and the busker. Shontal tells Mary to ring Trevor, the man who came into the shop after she falls for him.
5	"The Chicken Awards"	22 September 2015	1.5
As Mary, Derek, Ed and Shontal head to The Chicken Awards. Amara and Joe are left to look after the shop on their own. Until Ed locks them both in the freezer. Mary meets ex-boyfriend Gareth at the Chicken Awards and attempts to flirt with her boss to make him jealous. Meanwhile Amara and Joe grow even closer.
6	"In the Beginning"	29 September 2015	1.6
It's back to the very beginning, As Mary from Head Office is hired to manage Seriously Fried Chicken in Croydon for a week and tries her best to impress her boss, Clive Bagshawe. She is then told she will be the full time manager of the Chicken Shop much to Mary's annoyance. Meanwhile Joe tries to get Amara to notice him and Ed tells him to delete texts from her ex-boyfriend, causing Joe to get in trouble.
