= Sutara Gayle =

British actress and singer (born 1963)

- Born: Lorna N Gayle; 14 April 1963 (age 62); Lambeth, London, England
- Other names: Lorna Gayle; Lorna Gee
- Education: Webber Douglas Academy of Dramatic Art
- Occupations: Actress; singer
- Years active: 2007–present
- Television: Fried; Doctors; Silent Witness; Magpie Murders; Strike
- Relatives: Mooji (brother)

Lorna N Gayle (born 14 April 1963), known professionally as Sutara Gayle, is a British actress and singer, known for appearing in the films Run Fatboy Run (2007), The Dark Knight (2008) and One Day (2011). In 2015, she played Shontal in the BBC Three sitcom Fried. As Lorna Gee, she won awards as a lovers rock reggae singer. Between 2021 and 2022, she played the role of Gloria Mason-Walker in Silent Witness.

== Career ==
Since beginning her career in 2007, Gayle has appeared in films, on television and on stage. Gayle's first audition was for the tap-dancing play Stepping Out. She has also appeared in the West End musical Tina. She portrayed the role of Gloria Mason-Walker in Silent Witness on a recurring basis between 2021 and 2022. In 2022, she appeared in four episodes of Magpie Murders as Gemma Whiteley and as Kim Sullivan in the BBC drama Strike.

Whilst on a trip to India with her brother in 2011, Gayle made some "personal discoveries" and was given a naming ceremony, in which she was given the name "Sutara" which has used professionally since 2020.

== Filmography ==
Film
Year	Title	Role	Notes
2006	Love and Other Disasters	Heathrow Female Guard	
2007	Dangerous Parking	Nurse	
2007	Run Fatboy Run	Nurse	
2008	The Dark Knight	Passenger	
2009	Hell's Pavement	Moira Reynolds	
2010	National Theatre Live: Nation	Marisgala	
2011	One Day	Mrs. Major	
2013	Having You	Michelle	
2017	A Caribbean Dream	Bottom the Fisherwoman	
2018	Shift the Plane	Danny's Mum	Short film
2019	Carmilla	Margaret	
2022	Viral	Jackie	Short film

Television
Year	Title	Role	Notes
2008	Torchwood	Helen	Episode: "Adrift"
2014	Utopia	Midwife	1 episode
2015	Fried	Shontal	
2015	EastEnders	Irene Daniels	Guest appearance
2017	Holby City	Ella Chambers	1 episode
2017, 2020	Doctors	Grace Fields	Episodes: "Bounce" and "It Takes a Village"
2017	The Rebel	Gloria	1 episode
2020	Anthony	Pam	Television film
2020	The Duchess	Seleena	1 episode
2020–2023	Ghosts	Betty	Episodes: "The Ghost of Christmas"; "A Christmas Gift"
2021–2022	Silent Witness	Gloria Mason-Walker	Recurring role
2021	Magpie Murders	Gemma Whiteley	4 episodes
2022	Strike	Kim Sullivan	4 episodes
