= Finding Fatimah =

2017 British romantic comedy film

- Finding Fatimah official UK release poster
- Directed by: Oz Arshad
- Written by: Oz Arshad
- Produced by: Sol Harris
- Starring: Danny Ashok; Asmara Gabrielle; Nina Wadia; Wahab Sheikh; Mandeep Dhillon
- Cinematography: Phil Moreton
- Edited by: Esther Gimenez
- Music by: James Hesford
- Production company: BMTV
- Distributed by: Icon Film Distribution
- Release date: 21 April 2017 (United Kingdom)
- Running time: 99 minutes
- Country: United Kingdom
- Language: English
- Budget: £325,000

Finding Fatimah is a British romantic comedy written and directed by Oz Arshad. The film is about a man who struggles to find love in the British Asian community due to the stigma of his divorce several years prior.

The majority of Finding Fatimah was filmed in Manchester with additional sequences filmed in West Yorkshire and London. It was released in UK cinemas on 21 April 2017 with a 12A certificate granted by the BBFC.

The film was produced on a budget of £325,000.

== Cast ==
- Danny Ashok as Shahid
- Asmara Gabrielle as Fatimah
- Nina Wadia as Khadija
- Wahab Sheikh as Nav
- Mandeep Dhillon as Nayna
- Ambreen Razia as Hafsah
- Shobna Gulati as Saba
- Arif Javid as Tawheed
- Abdullah Afzal as Jahid
- Ewen MacIntosh as Lionel
- Dave Spikey as Mr Gruff
- Guz Khan as Rocky
- Theresa Godly as Aaliyah
- Denise Welch as Valerie
- Imran Yusuf as Sid
- Alessandra D'Averio as Adela
- Sajid Varda as Arif
- Tim Dalgleish as Yameen
- Zoe Iqbal as Fiza

== Production ==
Producer, Sol Harris, and director, Oz Arshad were freelancing for British Muslim TV and pitched the idea of producing a movie with the intent of it being toured as a means of charity fundraising for Penny Appeal. A story idea was presented and it was agreed that the studio would have final cut to restrict story, scenes or shots along the way if they felt it would not satisfy both a conservative and liberal Muslim audience.

Pre-production began in February 2016. Harris and Arshad worked together to create the characters that were then written into the screenplay.

Principal photography took place in small installments between July 2016 and October 2016 with additional pick-up days in December 2016 and January 2017.

In spite of the restrictions placed on the film, Arshad and Harris wanted to make the film as accessible as possible to a mainstream audience. Speaking to CloseShave TV, Arshad said "The universal theme of this movie is finding love and these two characters just happen to be Muslim". Due to this mainstream approach, the film surpassed its initial releases plans and Icon picked it up for theatrical distribution in 2017.

Post-production sound was handled by Neil Hillman with most of the mix taking place at The Audio Suite in Birmingham, but some of it at Pinewood Studios.

Penny Appeal toured the film, screening it a total of 23 times in 19 different cities. The tour was a huge success, with over 10,000 tickets being sold across the tour and the Leicester Square event, alone, raising over £100,000 for charity. Penny Appeal founder Adeem Younis confirmed in his 2021 book 'Small Change Big Difference: The Penny Appeal Story' that the Finding Fatimah tour raised over £600,000.

== Soundtrack ==
The film's score was written and recorded by composer James Hesford.

The soundtrack features "The First Cut Is the Deepest" by Cat Stevens. Stevens granted the production the rights to use the song for free due to liking the rough cut of the film he was shown.

"Life is a Love-Story" is performed by Scor-Zay-Zee, who makes a cameo in the film.

== Reception ==
The film received mixed reviews from mainstream publications. On review aggregator website Rotten Tomatoes, the film holds an approval rating of 13% based on 8 reviews, with an average rating of 4.12/10.

In the mainstream media, one consistent point was the film's high production values given its budget of just £325,000. The Evening Standard gave the film 3 out of 5 stars, praising its use of a "staggeringly low budget". The sentiment was repeated by MaryAnn Johanson, writing for Flick Filosopher, who said "Arshad makes his ridiculously low-budget film look far more expensive: I would never have guessed that Finding Fatimah was made for under half a million pounds. That’s just nuts". Overall, she said "There’s lots to like in this mostly sweet British Muslim rom-com. Pity, then, that it tries too hard, instead of trusting its characters, and sabotages itself", awarding the film 2.5 stars out of 5.

Total Film gave the film 3 out of 5 stars, praising the chemistry between the leads and comparing the writing to vintage Richard Curtis.

ShortList gave the film a positive review, with their takeaway being that it "Refreshingly explores a romantic red line that isn't farcially extreme, but instead an unspoken barrier to love for so many".

The National Student gave the film 4 out of 5, praising what it achieves on such a small budget and claiming that "it hangs together seamlessly in terms of production value; it's well edited and thoroughly enjoyable from start to finish" and calling Oz Arshad's debut as director "a triumph".

Ahead of its release, The Guardian praised the film for "putting authentic British Asian characters centre-screen" and poised that it might "help end Muslim stereotypes in film". However, once the film was released, film critic Peter Bradshaw slated the film for a "bafflingly lame and leaden script and plodding direction that wouldn't pass muster for TV in a thousand years", awarding it 1 star out of 5.

The film was almost universally acclaimed by Asian press, with Asiana.TV giving the film a positive review, stating "As independent British films go, Finding Fatimah is unlike others in recent years and it's this originality that will cement its place in modern cinema".

Asian Image gave the film a positive review, praising the lack of stereotypes and cliches and calling it "a well-executed and refreshingly honest take on life as a single British Muslim".

The Platform gave the film a positive review, stating "The tasteful comedy, with genuine characters and an amalgamation of Asian culture with abject Britishness, makes Finding Fatimah a pleasure – but more importantly, a welcome breath of fresh air. It is a film that should have been made a decade ago, and is a welcome release to the tension the media have contributed to propagating about Muslims".

DESIblitz gave the film a positive review, praising its originality and "fresh perspective".
