= Sol Harris =

British producer, director, writer and podcaster

- Other name: Señor Sevens

Sol Harris is a British producer, director, writer and podcaster. He is host of the film podcast "Diminishing Returns".

== Career ==
Harris worked with director, Oz Arshad, to develop the story and create the characters featured in Finding Fatimah before Arshad wrote the screenplay. Starting in 2017, Harris became a regular contributor to Starburst magazine. He has previously written about film and TV for the website WhatCulture.

In 2016, Harris launched the weekly film podcast, "Diminishing Returns", with co-hosts Calvin Dyson and Allen Turing. The show sees the hosts reviewing a film before pitching their own ideas for what the sequel should be.

The show was inspired by Dyson's webseries, "My Weekly Bond", in which he reviewed one James Bond film a week. As friends and film-fans, Dyson had pushed Harris to watch the James Bond series, with Harris generally being unimpressed. They decided to build a podcast around their resulting discussions, with the podcast repeatedly returning to the James Bond franchise as a result. It has placed as highly as #3 in the UK TV & Film iTunes podcast chart.

Sol achieved notoriety as a die-hard fan of The Simpsons after a chart he produced, showcasing the show's perceived decline, became popular. He had previously cited the show as a major influence on him. He has since appeared on a variety of radio shows as a "Simpsons expert", including appearances on Dermot and Dave and RTÉ.
