= Mandeep Dhillon =

British actress and singer (born 1990)

- Born: 21 December 1990 (age 35); Letchworth, Hertfordshire, England
- Occupation: Actress
- Years active: 2008–present

Mandeep Dhillon (born 21 December 1990) is a British actress and singer. On television, she is known for her roles in the BBC series Some Girls (2012–2014), Fried (2015), The City and the City (2018) and Avoidance (2022–2024), the Netflix series After Life (2019–2020), the CBS series CSI: Vegas (2021–2024), and the Paramount+ series MobLand (2025). Her films include Finding Fatimah (2017) and The Sheep Detectives (2026)

== Early life ==
Dhillon was born on 21 December 1990 and grew up in Hertfordshire, the youngest of three children, brought up by her mother who was a social worker. Dhillon attended Wilbury Primary School and Fearnhill School, Letchworth.

In a 2019 interview, Dhillon said that as she was unable to afford acting lessons, she made sure that she participated in all of the school plays for experience. She also stated that soon after starting her A-levels, she dropped out of college, and joined a performing arts institution in London. Dhillon said in a 2015 interview that she decided to become an actress shortly before her 19th birthday, and started emailing agencies using contact details that she found on the Spotlight website. One of the agencies offered her a place on a workshop, following which she received an audition for Some Dogs Bite (2010), which became her first television appearance.

== Career ==
In 2011, Dhillon played a school student in The Knowledge at the Bush Theatre. The production received a positive review in The Times, with Dominic Maxwell saying that "There [was] not a whiff of stage school" to the actors, including Dhillon, portraying the students. Also in 2011, at the Bush Theatre, Dhillon appeared in Little Platoons, a drama about free schools. A radio production featuring Dhillon and the rest of the original cast was broadcast on BBC Radio 4. The following year, at the same venue, she appeared in Repentance, as a young Muslim woman conflicted about her romantic relationship with a non-Muslim. The Daily Telegraph's Charles Spencer felt that Dhillon gave a "touching performance" in a play that "potently catches the clash between faith and sexual desire". The Financial Times called Dhillon's performance "powerfully acted", and Time Out said she was "luminous".

After appearances in The Mimic (2011) and The Thick of It (2012), she starred as the character Saz Kaur, a sarcastic high school student from a strict Indian family, in Some Girls, which aired on BBC Three from 2012 to 2014. Dhillon went on to appear as a guest character in seven episodes of the 2014 TV series 24: Live Another Day, alongside Kiefer Sutherland. The low budget romantic comedy A Wonderful Christmas Time was shot over five days and released in 2014, with the actors improvising around scripted outlines. Dhillon was in the main cast as Mandi, a friend of the lead Cherie played by Laura Haddock. Screen International described Dhillon as "impressive" in its review.

In the pilot for the comedy television series Fried, Dhillon's character was called Anal. In the main series the character's name is Amara, and she is from a wealthy family, having got a job in a fried chicken shop at the behest of her family who want her to appreciate the value of money.

Dhillon's performance as Meena in the stage adaptation of Anita and Me, which played at the Birmingham Repertory Theatre and then the Theatre Royal Stratford East in 2015, was praised by Dominic Cavendish in The Daily Telegraph as one of the "spirited performances" given by the main cast, although he felt that the production needed further development. Michael Billington in The Guardian had a similar view, giving the play a middle-rated 3 stars out of 5, whilst highlighting the "good work" done by Mandeep Dhillon and her co-star Jalleh Alizadeh.

She auditioned for Ricky Gervais's film David Brent: Life on the Road (2016) and won the part of a receptionist after Gervais asked her what she thought of the David Brent character and she replied "he scares me." She appeared in the British romantic comedy film Finding Fatimah in 2017. Umbreen Ali in Asian Image gave the movie a positive review, saying that "the charismatic Nayna [played by Dhillon] delivers her dialogue with perfectly projected dramatic nuance." In 2017, Dhillon played the lead role as Krishna in the short film Garfield and won the Actor Award at Underwire Film Festival.

Dhillon played the main character Constable Lizbyet Corwi in the four part BBC Drama The City and the City in 2018, alongside David Morrissey who played her police partner, Inspector Tyador Borlú. Dhillon said in a 2018 interview that she enjoyed the role and working with Morrissey, one of the reasons being that "To actually play a lead, a female lead, and to have a male cop and a female cop, and there not be any sexual tension ... we could have bants and have that good friendship vibe." She also spoke positively of her perception that the show used colour blind casting. The Evening Standard praised Dhillon's performance, and said that she "[stood out] as somehow simultaneously plucky and deadpan".

In the black comedy series After Life (2019–2022), Dhillon portrays Sandy, a journalist working for Tony, played by the show's creator, Gervais. The two characters form what Wonderland Magazine called "a compassionate and nurturing bond". The pair had previously worked together on David Brent: Life on the Road, and according to her account, he approached her at a Christmas Party and told her that he had written the role in After Life with her in mind. In 2019, she was in the films Star Wars: The Rise of Skywalker as Lieutenant Garan, and Songbird, a film, like A Wonderful Christmas Time, that was directed by Jamie Adams and included improvisation. The reviewer of Songbird in the Oxford Times lamented that Dhillon and the other actors were "talented performers ... saddled with such negligible roles". She played a "cat cleric" that worships the character Dave Lister in Red Dwarf: The Promised Land (2020). During the COVID-19 pandemic in the United Kingdom, Dhillon recorded a self-written monologue titled "Letter to My Future Self" in support of an initiative to raise money for the benevolent fund of the actors' union Equity, and starred in a short online film, The Forgotten C, based on the true story of a woman who died from lung cancer during the UK lockdown.

On radio, she participated in Newsjack in 2017, a show that features the cast performing material sent in by the public, and has appeared in leading roles in BBC Radio 4 dramas The Beard (2018) and Freezing to Death (and How to Avoid It) (2020).

== Filmography ==
=== Film ===
Year	Title	Role	Notes	Ref.
2004	Tears of Kali	Clerk at Teahouse		
2014	A Wonderful Christmas Time	Mandi		
2015	Nina Forever			
2016	David Brent: Life on the Road	Karen Parashar		
2017	Freehold	Mel		
2017	Garfield	Krishna	Short Film	
2017	Finding Fatimah	Nayna		
2017	Offline Dating	Mandy (Herself)	YouTube	
2018	Songbird	Susie		
2019	Star Wars: The Rise of Skywalker	Lieutenant Garan		
2020	Letter to My Future Self	Herself	YouTube	
2020	The Forgotten C	Aisha	Short film	
2026	The Sheep Detectives	Postwoman Jo		

=== Television ===
Year	Title	Role	Notes	Ref.
2010	Some Dogs Bite	Seema	TV movie	
2013	The Mimic	Chelsea		
2012	The Thick of It	Rohinka	1 episode: "Series 4 – Episode 5"	
2012–2014	Some Girls	Saz Kaur	Main cast; 18 episodes	
2013	Whitechapel	Sabima Masud	2 episodes	
2014	24: Live Another Day	Chell	7 episodes	
2014	Wolfblood	Dacia Turner	9 episodes	
2015	The Revolution Will Be Televised	Herself	1 episode: "Democracy Dealers"	
2015	Fried	Amara	7 episodes	
2015	My Jihad	Yasmin	TV Mini Series	
2016	Stan Lee's Lucky Man	Indira Kamal	1 episode: "The Charm Offensive"	
2017	Hospital People	Shaz Dutta	6 episodes	
2017	Doctor Who	Shireen	1 episode: "Knock Knock"	
2017	Inspector George Gently	Kiran Johal	1 episode: "Gently and the New Age"	
2017	Comedy Playhouse	Jane Seymour	Episode: "Tim Vine Travels Through Time"	
2018	The City and the City	Constable Lizbyet Corwi	TV Mini Series	
2018	The Good Karma Hospital	Mandeep Khattri	3 episodes	
2018	Bulletproof	Kamali Khan	6 episodes	
2018	Hounslow Diaries	Tash	1 episode: "Pilot"	
2018	Zapped	Caz	4 episodes	
2019–2020	After Life	Sandy	Main cast (Series 1 & 2); 12 episodes	
2020	Red Dwarf: The Promised Land	Luna	TV movie	
2020	Wonderdate	Flo	TV Short	
2020	Adult Material	Abby	3 episodes	
2021	Pls Like	Izzy	1 episode: "Home & Lifestyle"	
2021	Elliott from Earth	Nara	Voice only	
2021	Temple	DI Kam Skinner	4 episodes	
2021–2024	CSI: Vegas	Allie Rajan	Main cast	
2022–2024	Peacock	Georgia	Main cast	
2022–2024	Avoidance	Dan	Main cast	
2025–present	MobLand	Seraphina Harrigan	Main cast	

=== Theatre ===
Year	Title	Role	Notes	Ref.
2008	New Path	Katrina	CANDI Productions	
2009	The Tempest	Lady Sebastian	CANDI Productions	
2011	The Knowledge	Sal	Bush Theatre	
2011	Little Platoons	Amitha	Bush Theatre	
2011	Holloway Jones	Gemma	Bush Theatre	
2012	Angle at the Bush: Repentance	Michelle	Bush Theatre	
2015	Anita and Me	Meena	Birmingham Repertory Theatre & Theatre Royal Stratford East	

=== Radio ===
Year	Title	Role	Notes	Ref.
2011	Little Platoons	Amitha	BBC Radio 4 (recorded with the Bush Theatre production stage cast)	
2017	Newsjack	Performer	BBC Radio 4	
2018	The Beard	Sally Martin	BBC Radio 4	
2020	Freezing to Death (and How to Avoid It)	Avdotya	BBC Radio 4	
2020	Quartet for the End of Time	Anika (First Violin)	BBC Radio 4	

== Awards and nominations ==
Year	Award	Category	Work	Result	Ref
2018	Underwire Film Festival	Actor Award	Garfield (Short film)	Won	
2021	National Film Awards UK	Best Actress in a TV Series	After Life	Nominated	
