= Ruth Bratt =

British actress

Ruth Bratt is an English actress and comedian. Bratt has appeared in the BAFTA award winning BBC2 series People Just Do Nothing. In 2022 she was at the Edinburgh Festival in "Starship Improvise" with the Mischief Theatre.

== Career ==
Bratt was a runner-up in the 2005 edition of the Funny Women competition, which Sarah Adams had started in 2003.

On TV, Bratt has played a number of different roles in several episodes of BBC Three's Mongrels and in 2013 appeared in Ricky Gervais' show Derek. She went on to play Roche, girlfriend of Kevin Bates (aka DJ Beats) in BBC3's People Just Do Nothing. Roche loves Kevin but wishes he would be a more hands-on dad and not spend all of his time with MC Grindah. She also had the recurring role of care home assistant Carol in series 4 of Greg Davies' Channel 4 sitcom Man Down (2017).

She made TV appearances on FAQ U (2005) on Channel 4, and Rob Brydon's Annually Retentive on BBC Three (2006). She was intended to have a larger role in the latter but most of the scenes where she had dialogue were cut. She has also appeared in TV advertisements for products such as Kellogg's Nutrigrain bars. In 2007 she appeared in Touch Me, I'm Karen Taylor as Dutch "climatologist" Yolanda van der Landavan.

Her stage appearances include Aliens Are Scary and Morpheus Descending at the Pleasance, Edinburgh as well as George Orwell’s School Disco and The Service Elevator at Soho Theatre. Bratt is a founding member of Showstopper! The Improvised Musical. She was also part of the Reduced Edinburgh Fringe Impro Show in 2005. She took third place in the 2005 Babycham Funny Women Awards.

She co-wrote and co-starred with Lucy Trodd in the BBC radio comedy series Trodd en Bratt Say 'Well Done You' in 2014.

In May 2023, alongside Charlie Cooper, she began voicing Connie the doll in an advertising campaign for retailer Argos.

In March 2024, Bratt became the first new core member to join improv group the Comedy Store Players in thirty years.
