= Hoff the Record =

British television comedy show

- Genre: Comedy, satire
- Starring: David Hasselhoff
- Country of origin: United Kingdom
- Original language: English
- No. of series: 2
- No. of episodes: 12

Production
- Running time: 30 minutes

Original release
- Network: Dave
- Release: 18 June 2015 – 10 June 2016

Hoff the Record is a British television comedy show starring David Hasselhoff, which was screened on Dave in June 2015. It follows a mockumentary fly-on-the-wall format with David Hasselhoff playing a fictionalised version of himself in the autumn of his career, relocating to the UK to seek new opportunities. A second series was commissioned by Dave and began airing on 6 May 2016.

== Cast ==
Character	Portrayed by	Series	
Character	Portrayed by	Series 1 (2015)	Series 2 (2016)
David Hasselhoff	David Hasselhoff	Main	Main
Max Coleman	Fergus Craig	Main	Main
Dieter Hasselhoff	Mark Quartley	Main	Main
Terry Patel	Asim Chaudhry	Main	Main
Harriet Fitzgerald	Ella Smith	Main	Main
Danny Jones	Brett Goldstein	Main	Main

== Series overview ==
Series	Episodes	Originally released	
Series	Episodes	First released	Last released
1	6	18 June 2015	23 July 2015
2	6	6 May 2016	10 June 2016

== Episodes ==
A total of twelve episodes across two series were produced and broadcast.

=== Series 1 (2015) ===
No. overall	No. in series	Title	Original release date	Prod. code
1	1	"The Movie"	18 June 2015	1.01
David arrives to meet his manager Max and is introduced to his assistant and driver. Attempting to reinvigorate his career, his first role is casting for the part in his biopic, however he struggles to impress the director.
2	2	"Renew or Die"	25 June 2015	1.02
Max reveals his latest proposal for David; an aftershave commercial. As the recording doesn't go well, he is recorded in a private conversation making perceived derogatory comments about women.
3	3	"The United Nations"	2 July 2015	1.03
Following a personal training session, the Hoff decides to do good in the world and wants to become a UN goodwill ambassador. To gain experience, he attends a mock UN meeting at a school and faces up against the obnoxious head boy Alvin.
4	4	"Hostile Environment Training"	9 July 2015	1.04
The Hoff decides to contribute to charity, helping to dismantle land mines. Attending a hostile environment training course with Dieter and Harriet, the foul-mouthed course leader causes David and Dieter to make an escape attempt.
5	5	"The Warlord"	16 July 2015	1.05
Max arranges for The Hoff to attend the birthday party of a "community leader", who turns out to be a trigger-happy warlord in Tergistan. Dieter performs an insulting dance, with the group having to escape in the Warlord's converted Opel "KITT" car.
6	6	"The Abduction"	23 July 2015	1.06
Terry kidnaps his daughter while driving David to Southend-on-Sea, with the police believing and media reporting that David has kidnapped the girl. On top of a multi-storey car park, Terry launches a Fathers 4 Justice protest.

=== Series 2 (2016) ===
No. overall	No. in series	Title	Original release date	Prod. code
7	1	"Death Hoax"	6 May 2016	2.01
A death hoax over David and a watersports accident does Hoff's album sales no harm at all, but our hapless hero struggles to stay deceased while Danny plans a search and rescue mission.
8	2	"Rehab"	13 May 2016	2.02
Max checks Hoff into rehab.
9	3	"Divorce"	20 May 2016	2.03
Hoff's new manager promises him Shakespeare. What he gets instead is celeb cage fighting.
10	4	"Wedding"	27 May 2016	2.04
Hoff is booked to perform at a wedding.
11	5	"Finance"	3 June 2016	2.05
Hoff enters a devil's pact with a suave millionaire to fund a musical.
12	6	"Horror"	10 June 2016	2.06
Hoff gets a role in a low-budget horror film.

== Home media ==
The first six episodes plus deleted scenes were released in a single-disc DVD set on 30 November 2015.

The series streamed on Netflix in the United States between 2017 and 2022.
