= The Chicken Connoisseur =

Internet personality

- Born: Elijah Quashie; May 1993 (age 33); Enfield, London, England
- Occupations: Internet celebrity; Fried chicken restaurant critic

YouTube information
- Channel: The CNSR
- Years active: 2015–present
- Genre: Food
- Subscribers: 859 thousand
- Views: 113 million
- Last updated: 21 October 2025

Elijah Quashie (born 1993), also known as The Chicken Connoisseur or The CNSR (screen name), is an internet celebrity and fried chicken restaurant critic, known for his viral YouTube video series The Pengest Munch.

== Career ==
Quashie started his YouTube channel The Pengest Munch in August 2015, inspired by Gregg Wallace of television series MasterChef, produced by film maker Elishama Udorok. Until December 2016, Quashie's videos had around 700 views each, with a total of 150 subscribers. The videos involve Quashie visiting, critiquing and rating chicken shops around London.

The Pengest Munch went viral on 9 December, with coverage from The Huffington Post, The Daily Telegraph and BuzzFeed and support from John Boyega and Graham Linehan. Metro cited "stunning insight, humour and style" as the reasons behind his success. Another focus of the coverage has been the use of slang in the videos; The Huffington Post has been criticised for suggesting that in these videos "the slang of working class black kids is beyond normal comprehension". He appeared on ITV London on 13 December, and released a new episode to YouTube on 16 December.

In April 2017 it was announced that he would be writing a book entitled The Pengest Munch: In Search of the Nation's 50 Favourite Chicken Establishments, published by Blink Publishing.

It was announced in October 2017 that Quashie would star in a new Channel 4 television show entitled The Peng Life. The programme started in August 2018 and featured four episodes.

In January 2021, Quashie renamed his channel to The CNSR.

== Controversy ==
In January 2017, Quashie came under criticism after he featured Taylor Harris (stage name 'Bonkaz') rapping in one of his YouTube videos. Harris was previously convicted of groping a 13-year-old girl in 2010. Harris was also jailed for three years in 2011 for his part in a murder of a 22-year-old disabled man.

== Personal life ==
Quashie lives in Tottenham in North London. Following his rise to fame, many people speculated about his age due to his youthful appearance, some assuming him to be a decade younger. Quashie is a renowned Arsenal fan, stating it in his YouTube videos and interviews since his rise to prominence. He is also a member of the Church of Jesus Christ of Latter-day Saints.

In May 2017, Quashie endorsed Labour Party leader Jeremy Corbyn in the 2017 UK general election. During an interview with The Fader he said: "he's one of the few people who make sense".
