= Ash Atalla =

Egyptian-born British television producer (born 1972)

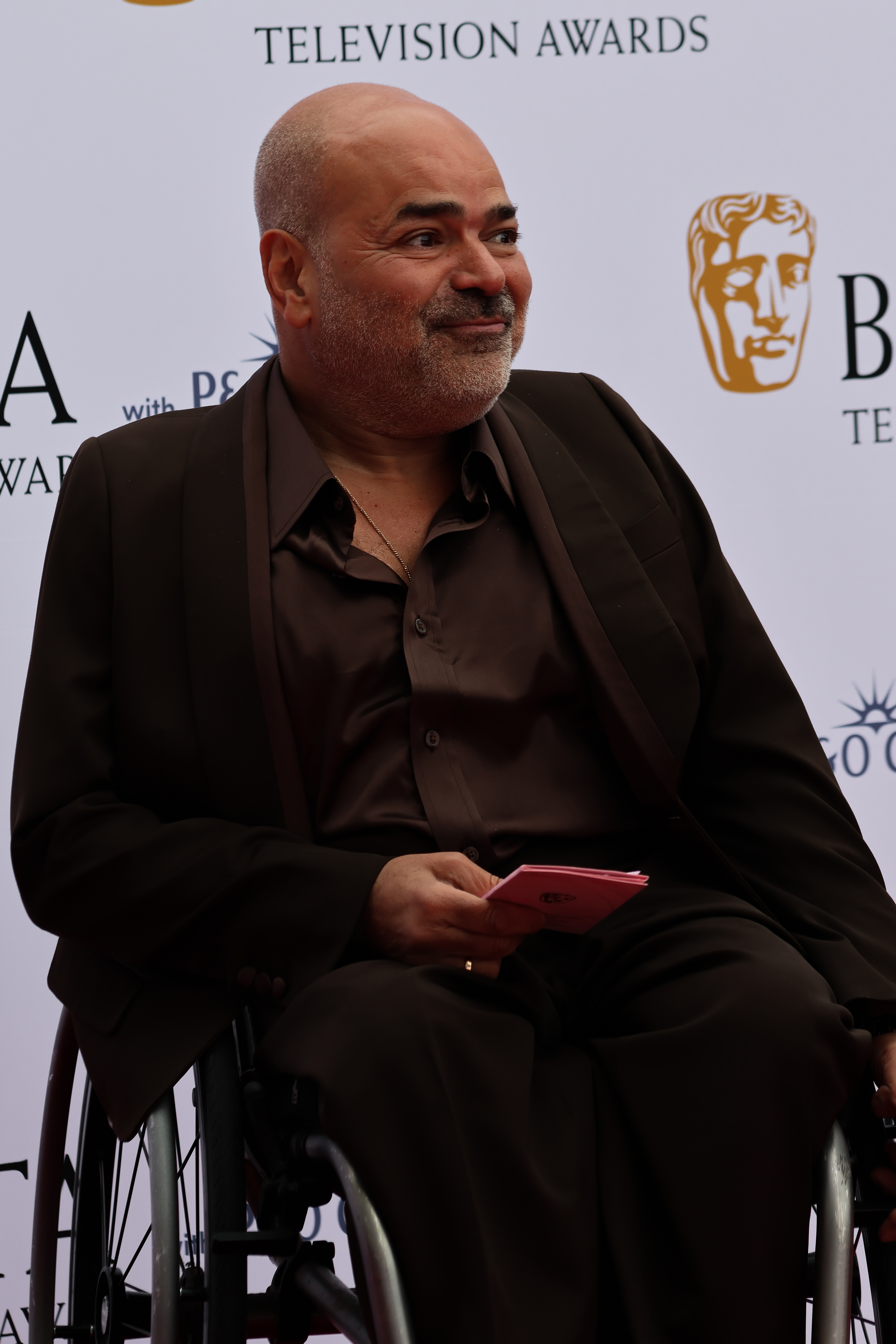
- Atalla at the 2026 British Academy Television Awards
- Born: 18 June 1972 (age 54); Cairo, Egypt
- Education: University of Bath
- Occupation: Television producer
- Years active: 1999–present
- Known for: Roughcut TV
- Notable work: The Office; The IT Crowd; Man Stroke Woman; People Just Do Nothing

Ash Atalla (born 18 June 1972) is an Egyptian British television producer. He has produced several British TV series such as The Office, The IT Crowd, Man Stroke Woman and People Just Do Nothing. He has also made cameo appearances in productions such as Ricky Gervais's Politics.

== Early life ==
Atalla was born into a middle-class family in Cairo, Egypt. He caught the polio virus as a baby and uses a wheelchair. He emigrated to London due to his father's job. He read business and finance at the University of Bath. He briefly worked as a stockbroker and a currency trader before, at 22, he found unpaid work on BBC Watchdog.

== Career ==
Atalla made his first appearance on television in 1999, when he co-presented a Channel 4 series on disability, Freak Out. In 2001, he produced the sitcom The Office. Atalla joined the production company Talkback Thames in 2004 as Head of Comedy and produced both the science spoof Look Around You for BBC2, and the third series of Bo Selecta! In 2005, he devised and began work on Man Stroke Woman, a comedy sketch show about "growing up", which aired from 2005 to 2007. He also produced The IT Crowd (2006–2010).

In 2007, Atalla set up Roughcut TV, an independent production company, with which he produced Trinity for ITV2 in 2008. Roughcut TV has since produced shows for all the UK's major broadcasters, including Trollied (Sky 1), Cuckoo (BBC Three), World's Craziest Fools - starring Mr. T (BBC Three), Anna & Katy (Channel 4), People Just Do Nothing (BBC Three), Mad Mad World (ITV 1) and Top Coppers (BBC Three). He has also made cameo appearances in productions such as Ricky Gervais' Politics, The IT Crowd, and Dad.
