= People Just Do Nothing =

British mockumentary sitcom

- Genre: Sitcom; Mockumentary
- Created by: Steve Stamp; Allan "Seapa" Mustafa; Hugo Chegwin; Asim Chaudhry (Note: Credited as a creator from series three onwards.)
- Written by: Steve Stamp; Allan "Seapa" Mustafa
- Directed by: Jack Clough
- Starring: Allan "Seapa" Mustafa; Hugo Chegwin; Asim Chaudhry; Steve Stamp; Dan Sylvester; Lily Brazier; Ruth Bratt; Olivia Jasmine Edwards
- Composers: Hugo Chegwin; Harry Craze; Allan "Seapa" Mustafa; Steve Stamp (s. 2)
- Country of origin: United Kingdom
- Original language: English
- No. of series: 5
- No. of episodes: 27

Production
- Executive producers: Ash Atalla; Jon Petrie (s. 4–5)
- Producers: Jon Petrie (s. 1–3); Jack Clough (s. 4–5)
- Cinematography: Jamie Cairney (s. 1); Si Bell (s. 2); Matthew Wicks (s. 3–5)
- Editor: Gareth Heal
- Running time: 25–30 minutes
- Production company: Roughcut TV

Original release
- Network: BBC Three; BBC Two
- Release: 20 July 2014 – 17 December 2018

Related
- People Just Do Nothing: Big in Japan

People Just Do Nothing is a British television mockumentary sitcom, created and performed by Allan "Seapa" Mustafa, Steve Stamp, Asim Chaudhry and Hugo Chegwin.

The programme follows the lives of MC Grindah, DJ Beats and their friends, who run Kurupt FM, a pirate radio station broadcasting UK garage and drum and bass music from Brentford in West London.

The programme originally began as a series of online shorts that became popular enough that the group were asked to make a pilot episode for BBC3's Comedy Feeds. The first series was released on BBC Three in July 2014, with the fifth and final series airing on BBC Two in 2018. A film continuation, People Just Do Nothing: Big in Japan, was released in August 2021.

In 2017, the show won the BAFTA award and Royal Television Society award for Best Scripted Comedy. Many of the actors in the show have gone on to tour as a musical act, in character as their personas from Kurupt FM.

== Premise ==
People Just Do Nothing is a mockumentary, in which the characters give interviews to the camera and are taped in a loose, documentary fashion. An off-screen interviewer is occasionally heard. The "documentary" follows the fortunes of "Kurupt FM", a pirate radio station broadcasting UK garage music from a flat in Brentford, West London.

The main characters are MC Grindah, DJ Beats, DJ Steves, DJ Decoy and their entrepreneurial manager, Chabuddy G. The show follows their personal lives, with a strong focus on their relationships with their respective female partners such as Miche and Roche.

All of the characters have an inflated sense of their own talent and success; Steve Stamp, who portrays Steves, said "A lot of talented people don’t have enough confidence, but then there’s a lot of stupid people with no talent who have loads of confidence ... All our characters are super confident; they’re just not good at what they do." The characters fail to recognise their lowly status, with Grindah regularly making comments like "We're going global, but you will very much have to be in the Brentford area to hear us." The show plays off their stupidity; Rachel Aroesti of The Guardian has said, "Every character is really, quite comfortingly, dense, and their inability to read scenarios correctly is the source of nearly all the comedy." The show was summarised by Jamie Clifton of Vice as:

You don't need to know anything about garage to get it; the humour is in the hopelessness. Most of the principal characters are completely deluded in some way – Chabuddy, who believes his wife loves him, when she clearly does not. Or Grindah, who claims to reign over all MCs from a pirate station that only broadcasts five miles into London. You laugh at their failures, but it's a weird kind of schadenfreude because every character is so endearing you want them to succeed, not relentlessly embarrass themselves in front of a TV crew.

== Cast and characters ==
=== Main ===
- Allan "Seapa" Mustafa as Anthony "MC Grindah" Zografos (previously known as MC Sniper, pilot), the MC and founder/leader of the radio station. Grindah proclaims himself to be a musical genius, to the general indifference of Brentford and beyond, and struggles with the idea of anyone not liking garage music or realising his talent. He is childish and selfish, taking doting girlfriend/fiancée/wife Miche for granted and often bullying Beats into timidly agreeing with him. His posturing is frequently exposed, often resulting in his delusions being exposed. While easily frustrated and angered by a lack of recognition for his talent he is just as easily placated by any sort of positive recognition. He finally pushes Miche too far with his selfish behaviour at the end of Series 3, resulting in the pair briefly breaking up and Grindah becoming a hard drug addict. Grindah is eventually able to win her back after making only superficial changes to his behaviour (which he openly admits is to trick Miche into taking him back) and the pair marry at the end of Series 4. At the end of series 5 he is relocated outside of Brentford with Miche and Angel to Essex when the block of flats is scheduled for demolition.
- Hugo Chegwin as Kevin "DJ Beats" Bates, the principal DJ. Beats is the best friend of Grindah but is often bullied by him, much to the frustration of his partner, Roche. Despite his largely one-way friendship with Grindah — who uniformly either attempts to top anything Beats says or put him down openly — he remains utterly devoted to his MC. However, while Beats is a big believer in Kurupt FM he is also devoted to the long-suffering Roche and with attempting to form some sort of bond with his stepson Craig, something he often has to balance with keeping Grindah happy. Beats is naïve and almost as deluded as Grindah but is generally a more amiable and balanced person.
- Asim Chaudhry as Chabud "Chabuddy G" Gul, a failed local entrepreneur. Confident and smooth-talking but deluded, his schemes usually bring trouble to the group. Chabuddy believes himself to be an entrepreneur, and over the course of the series tries many schemes — among them an internet cafe, attempting to market factory rejected peanuts as "Peanut Dust", printing questionable bootleg t-shirts, opening a club named the Champagne Steam Rooms (later briefly a restaurant) and managing Kurupt FM. All of these ventures largely end in disaster, and by the third series he is forced to live in the back of his van while taking on part-time work at an electronics store. His love-life is just as catastrophic — at the start of the series he is married to Aldona, a Polish immigrant who overtly loathes him — which Chabuddy is either oblivious to or chooses to ignore out of desperation. She eventually robs him and leaves him for good, after which he desperately tries to land a new partner. His lack of social skills mean this is largely unsuccessful until he ends up in an emotionally damaging relationship with Miche's sexually aggressive mother Carol, which he eventually breaks off. At the end of the series he takes advantage of Steves' naivety to move into the flat and set up a cold-calling centre.
- Steve Stamp as Steven "Steves" Green, an uncouth drug addict and dull-witted lovable loser. His nan originally owns the flat from which the station broadcasts. After she is moved into an old people's home Grindah moved Kurupt FM into the flat, and due to his drug-addled stupidity is taken advantage of by the rest of the group. Steves DJs on Kurupt but only on graveyard shifts or when Grindah and Beats are busy with other antics, but more often acts as station dogsbody, often being sent to steal items the group needs — for which he is never thanked, while his doormat personality and substance dependency mean Chabuddy also often takes advantage of him. Steves is also a big believer in conspiracy theories, and on occasion shows surprising perception and talent — such as being a surprisingly talented pianist. He is also very close to his grandmother — the only relative of his seen in the series — and is devastated when she dies at the end of Series 3, spiralling before convincing himself she has been reincarnated as Beats' daughter Robyn. At the end of Season 4 he is arrested at Kurupt due to both the presence of pirate radio equipment and his huge personal stash of drugs but escapes with probation. Despite the dire risks of further prosecution the group continues to use his flat as the base for Kurupt and have him run errands.
- Dan Sylvester as Decoy, a level-headed DJ at the radio station. It is heavily implied that Decoy is the biological father of Miche's daughter Angel, a possibility to which Grindah remains completely oblivious. Decoy is non-confrontational and largely tries to keep out of the group's antics. He clearly has big reservations about the way Angel is being raised by Grindah and Miche but largely remains passive, though he reacted angrily to news of Angel moving to Essex. It seems that he is very popular with the ladies, and he frequently has to fend off the unsubtle advances of Carol. He is also frequently the target of Chabuddy's attempts at friendship. It is also heavily implied that the main reason Decoy spends so much time with Kurupt is to have a way of remaining close to Angel.
- Lily Brazier as Michelle Louise "Miche" Zografos (née Coleman), Grindah's girlfriend and, later, wife. She works at a hair salon, and dreams of becoming a celebrity. Miche is amiable but unintelligent, shown to be greatly influenced by social media and gossip magazines. She indulges Grindah, who she believes is the perfect man, and is an ardent believer in Kurupt FM. She is often let down when real life doesn't gel with her celebrity-tinged expectations but largely keeps cheerful and upbeat. At the end of Series 3 she finally loses patience with Grindah's selfishness and kicks him out, instead channelling most of her energy into trying to make Angel a celebrity with Miche as her "Mumager". However, she reconciles with Grindah and they marry at the end of Series 4 — though Miche is unable to pronounce "Zografos". In the final series she moves to Essex along with Grindah and Angel.
- Ruth Bratt as Roche, Beats' girlfriend, a security guard at a local cash and carry and former bouncer. Roche loves Beats but hates the radio station and despises Grindah. She has violent tendencies, being banned from working as a bouncer across the country due to an incident where a customer didn't have his ID and often seems to get excited at the chance to attack someone. This aside she is largely a balanced and sensible person, frequently being the most perceptive and worldly — for example, noting that Grindah and Miche are bad parents in a talking head. Roche tolerates Beats' bumbling side and her slovenly son Craig, and later she also develops a bond with Miche despite having vastly different personalities — even if she more pities Miche for her delusions.
- George Keywood as Craig, Roche's son from a former marriage, in his late teens, he is mostly at home playing video games. Morbidly obese and spoilt by Roche, his habits include eating packets of sliced ham, masturbating and loudly playing Call of Duty online into the small hours. Despite Craig's initial indifference to him, Beats is eventually able to bond with Craig. Despite his appearance and quiet personality, Craig has a surprising amount of success with women. In the final series he goes to university.
- Olivia Jasmine Edwards as Angel Zografos, Miche's young daughter. Grindah treats Angel as his daughter, but it is implied she was fathered by Decoy — Grindah believes her darker skin is due to his Cypriot heritage while Miche lamely offers that she was using a lot of spray tan during pregnancy. Angel is generally a sweet and happy child despite the neglect of both Grindah and Miche, who largely avoid parenting her. Miche especially treats Angel as a mere accessory, planning to earn a living off Angel's future fame (despite acknowledging that she doesn't really have any marketable talent) and trying sabotage any friends she makes at school out of jealousy. Due to Grindah usually not paying her much attention she seems to view Decoy as a father figure.

=== Recurring ===
- Maria Louis as Aldona (series 1–2), Chabuddy's unloving wife from Poland who frequently uses him for financial gain. Aldona openly despises Chabuddy apart from when she wants something out of him, and even then often struggles to hide her disgust with him. It is heavily implied she married him entirely for visa reasons, and when her apparent brother visits from Poland it is clear the two are in fact lovers — again something Chabuddy is oblivious to. She frequently runs away with his credit cards, and eventually leaves him for good in the second series — after stealing his prized Mercedes van and the contents of his internet cafe, after which Chabuddy finally realises their relationship is over.
- Marvin Jay Alvarez as Fantasy, one of the DJs at Kurupt FM, though not usually involved with the shenanigans of the station. Fantasy "not being one of the main ones" is called out on occasion in dialogue.
- Joel Tiddy as Weapon X (series 1–3), a DJ at Kurupt FM. He only appears in Series 1 and 3, after which Grindah makes references to him being in prison.
- Victoria Alcock as Carol (series 1–5), Miche's promiscuous and flirtatious mother. She considers Miche her best friend and hates both Grindah and Kurupt FM, believing Miche to be deserving of better. She has a high sex drive, frequently propositioning Decoy and often taking holidays abroad to take advantage of (much) younger men. After having sex with Chabuddy in a van at Grindah and Miche's wedding (after her attempts to seduce Decoy by mentioning her lack of a gag reflex were unsuccessful) the pair briefly embark on a relationship, which largely consists of Carol terrorising Chabuddy with her aggressive sexual needs (mainly consisting of lurid roleplay that always ends with Chabuddy "having to be punished") while continuing to have sex with other men. Eventually even the delusional Chabuddy realises how unhealthy this is and they break up — at which point she posts various humiliating pictures of him on social media.
- Tiff Stevenson as Tanya (series 2–5), Miche's boss at the salon. Tanya is more level-headed and worldly than most of the characters and does her best to keep Miche's feet on the ground. While she tries to be kind and patient with Miche she is often taken aback by her stupidity and daydreams.
- Pamela Lyne as Steves' nan (series 2–3), Steves' loving and good-humoured grandmother, who also supplies him with various drugs. She is aware of her grandson's love of substance abuse but does not seem to be clued in on how much he is being taken advantage of. There are various hints she had a close sexual relationship with a fellow resident at the old people's home. Steves' nan dies at the end of Series 3 from an unknown cause, leaving him devastated until he latches onto the belief that she has been reincarnated as Beats and Roche's daughter Robin, born the same day he found out about his nan's death. She also leaves him a considerable inheritance in cash, which is frittered away before the remnants are confiscated by the police.
- Petra Letang as Tia (series 3), an employee at Chabuddy's short-lived Champagne Steam Bar. She tactfully deflects Chabuddy's attempts to start a relationship with her, but vanishes from the series when he loses the bar and becomes homeless.
- Cally Lawrence as Jackie (series 3–5), an older hairdresser at the salon.
- Richard David-Caine as Sam (series 4–5), Chabuddy's boss at Sonoda, an electrical shop. Sam is amiable but professional, and struggles to deal with Chabuddy's antics while working at the branch, eventually sacking him after discovering he was damaging goods and stealing them to sell on.

== Production ==
=== Conception ===
The five main actors were friends for years before they began making the show. Hugo Chegwin had known Steve Stamp since childhood, became friends with Asim Chaudhry at college, and met Allan Mustafa through a mutual friend. Chegwin, Chaudhry and Mustafa would go on to work in a call centre with Dan Sylvester. They all had experience DJing or MCing on pirate radio in their youth, and no ambition to be actors. Mustafa said, "I rapped at the time, but we never really ended up making music. We just watched The Office a lot and smoked weed." In the late 2000s, Chegwin and Stamp had a "fake garage crew" on a real station called KuruptFM. Chegwin and Mustafa began creating characters and filming them, and were further inspired when they watched the BBC documentary series Tower Block Dreams, about London and Essex's underground music scene, and found the participants amusing. MC Grindah was based on a pirate radio boss from the series. Stamp and Chaudhry became involved, and the foursome began improvising material and putting it on YouTube under the name "Wasteman TV".

The YouTube videos were seen by producer Jon Petrie, who worked with Ash Atalla at Roughcut TV. Petrie later explained, "It wasn't fully-formed, but the more you watched it, the more you could see there was proper detail to the characters. I had no idea about garage, really, but I just loved them as comic creations." Atalla arranged to produce a pilot episode for BBC Three, released in August 2012. The pilot was the most shared video on iPlayer that month, and the BBC ordered a full series.

Many journalists have commented that the show is heavily influenced by The Office. David Renshaw has said, "At times, Grindah’s delusion in relation to his own success, talent and likeability is a mortifying dance away from full David Brent." Chabuddy G has been described as "an Asian Del Boy", of Only Fools and Horses. The actors have named their primary influences as The Office, This Is Spinal Tap, Alan Partridge, Ali G, Laurel and Hardy, and Mike Leigh.

=== Writing and filming ===
All episodes are written by Mustafa and Stamp, but the cast are given freedom to improvise their dialogue and sometimes film scenes spontaneously. By the third series, Mustafa estimated that material was "70/30 percent improvised". Chaudhry explained, "When you've been doing a character for six years, you can just snap into it – you know how they'd react in any situation", adding that he is continuously inspired by his father, "because he's like a real Chabuddy G, just not as ridiculous". The dialogue is often heavy with 21st century London slang. Much of the filming took place at Chesterton Court on the South Acton housing estate, before it was demolished. Series three was shot in Peckham, south-east London. All locations are based on the Haverfield Estate in Brentford, where Chegwin and Stamp grew up.

=== Series overview ===
Season	Episodes	Originally released	
Season	Episodes	First released	Last released
Webisodes	5	2011	
Pilot		17 August 2012	
1	4	20 July 2014	3 August 2014
2	5	15 July 2015	12 August 2015
3	6	17 August 2016	21 September 2016
4	6	15 August 2017	19 September 2017
5	6	12 November 2018	17 December 2018

== Episodes ==
=== Webisodes (2011) ===
No. overall	Title	Original release date
0.1	"No Sauce"	2011
Beats and Sniper are getting a munch from Maccy d's but its long and Beats wants every sauce. Sniper feels he's getting mugged off when he bumps into Steves, their squat-raving, day-dreaming wasteman friend.
0.2	"Pirate Radio Special"	2011
Sniper and Beats have found a new secret location to do their pirate radio set. Ryland, some mug who they rent the studio from is mugging them right off and Beats has a word with him so he knows who's boss. Sniper introduces us to the Kurupt FM family and a surprise visit from Steves causes controversy when an old beef is ignited between Kurupt FM and Lively FM.
0.3	"Fight Fire With Fire"	2011
Following their declaration of war against DJ Funky and Lively FM, Sniper and Beats seek help from local gangster / T Mobile salesman Chabuddie G. His advice leads them back to Ryland's studio to make a diss record.
0.4	"The F Word"	2011
Sniper calls an emergency meeting at the local barbers to discuss the funky beef, appropriate music to play and other important Kurupt FM chamunity issues.
0.5	"Music Vidjeo"	2011
Sniper and Beats are finally recording their first music video but there are bare issues and nobody is allowed to be mugging off the chamunity.

=== Pilot (2012) ===
No. overall	Title	Original release date
1a	"Comedy Feeds: People Just Do Nothing Pilot"	17 August 2012
Mockumentary that follows the lives of people connected to west London pirate radio station Kurupt FM. MC Sniper is released from a very short stretch in jail and finds that the station is having problems with its transmitter, threatening his comeback set.

=== Series 1 (2014) ===
No. overall	No. in season	Title	Original release date
1	1	"Secret Location"	20 July 2014
After receiving noise complaints from a neighbour, the members of Kurupt FM decide to soundproof the flat from which they broadcast. They enlist the help of local entrepreneur Chabuddy G, who devises a creative solution using egg boxes and factory second packets of peanuts in return for Kurupt airing his commercial.
2	2	"Angel's Birthday"	27 July 2014
Grindah is tasked with organizing his daughter's fifth birthday party. After his last-minute negotiations with Argos break down, Chabuddy G steps in to offer an adapted version of his hen's night party package. Meanwhile, DJ Beats flunks a job interview for Tie One.
3	3	"Competition"	3 August 2014
Kurupt FM run a listener competition, presenting the prize personally to the winner. Chabuddy G's wife's brother comes to visit from Poland, but their apparent closeness raises questions about the true nature of their relationship.
4	4	"The Website"	3 August 2014
The Kurupt crew ask Chabuddy G to design a website for their radio station. He agrees, in return for being allowed to play a DJ set on air. Steves attempts to obtain a crisis loan from the Job Centre. Strapped for cash, DJ Beats is forced to play at a friend's wedding reception to save the station and his washing machine.

=== Series 2 (2015) ===
No. overall	No. in season	Title	Original release date
5	1	"The Godfather"	15 July 2015
It is Angel's christening and Grindah is contemplating his choice of godfather.
6	2	"The Babysitter"	22 July 2015
Miche starts her new trial job at a salon, meaning Grindah is on babysitting duties.
7	3	"Weed Drought"	29 July 2015
Grindah and Beats are in the midst of a weed drought and take matters into their own hands.
8	4	"Promotion"	4 August 2015
Chabuddy prepares for his latest business venture, and Grindah has a big announcement for Miche. Meanwhile, Beats takes Craig on a comical father-and-son fishing trip.
9	5	"Clubnight"	12 August 2015
It's the opening night of Chabuddy's new nightclub, the Champagne Steam Rooms. The Kurupt FM crew prepare for their headliner set, while Miche is offered a full-time position at the salon.

=== Series 3 (2016) ===
No. overall	No. in season	Title	Original release date
10	1	"Dubplate"	17 August 2016
The band enter the studio to record their latest 'instant classic', while Miche chooses a venue for her marriage to Grindah. Meanwhile, Beats faces the prospect of fatherhood, and Chabuddy is on the lookout for love once again.
11	2	"Record Deal"	24 August 2016
Kurupt FM attempt to get a record deal. In need of a pay rise to pay for the upcoming wedding, Miche needs to pass a hairdressing test.
12	3	"Court Case"	31 August 2016
Grindah finds himself in trouble with the law again and prepares himself for a court date and possible jail sentence, leaving Steves with a daunting eight-hour set.
13	4	"New Friends"	7 September 2016
Chabuddy turns the bar into a restaurant and hires Steves. Miche reaches her breaking point over the wedding, with consequences for Grindah – who feels further marginalized by Beats's burgeoning bromance with his new friend Darren.
14	5	"Ipswich"	14 September 2016
Kurupt FM takes a road trip, after Chabuddy organizes a gig at a club in Ipswich. The gig is not very successful but the group persuade two girls to come back to their hotel room with them. Steves gets travel sick, gets separated from the group and has to hitch-hike to Ipswich.
15	6	"Valentimes"	21 September 2016
The last episode takes place around Valentine's Day. Roche goes into labour and gives birth. Steves goes to visit his Nan but is told that she has recently died. Grindah is left to run the station on Valentine's Day. He asks Miche to take him back but she refuses.

=== Series 4 (2017) ===
No. overall	No. in season	Title	Original release date
16	1	"Slipping"	15 August 2017
After his breakup with Miche, Grindah has been living with Steves and has developed a new drug habit, irritating the rest of Kurupt FM. Miche and Angel take part in a paid-for modeling photo-shoot, which Miche imagines will mark her rise to fame. A rival radio station, Kold FM, calls Kurupt FM after Steves and Grindah insult them over the phone; Grindah panics and moves the station to Miche's garage. The Kurupt FM crew stage an intervention for Grindah.
17	2	"Rivalry"	22 August 2017
Kurupt FM find out their antenna has been vandalised by Kold FM, and plan to ransack the latter. Grindah attempts to get back Miche by making a lasagne. His plan falls short when Miche's mother invites over a Spanish man for Miche to date. Steves tries to contact his dead Nan, whom he believes has been reincarnated in the form of Beats' and Roche's daughter Robyn.
18	3	"War"	29 August 2017
The Kurupt FM station has been vandalized by Kold FM. Kurupt and Chabuddy decide to install new locks, while Steves gets a safe for his inheritance money. Both plans fail as Beats and Chabuddy lock themselves outside, and Steves locks the safe without noting the password, prompting him to drop it from a high balcony (thus letting passers-by steal large amounts of the money). Grindah and Miche assist Angel's school in a visit to the RAF Museum. Grindah decides to return to Kurupt FM and make amends with Beats.
19	4	"Bosses"	5 September 2017
Steves takes Kold FM's dog hostage. This leads to a mafia style sit-down with the rival station in an Italian restaurant. The dog is returned to Kold FM in exchange for Kold changing their broadcast frequency. Miche continues to push Angel toward becoming a famous performer. Chabuddy takes a job at an electronics retailer. Grindah and Miche are reconciled, and talk of marriage.
20	5	"Stags & Hens"	12 September 2017
The boys and girls have their respective stag and hen parties. The Kurupt crew cause embarrassment when Beats hires a call girl instead of a stripper. Afterwards, the boys decide to visit a strip club instead, and are later joined by Chabuddy. Grindah goes missing, and Beats' attempts to find him lead to an altercation whereby he and the others are ejected from the club. It transpires that Grindah had made his way back to Roche's house, where Miche's hen party is being held, to declare his devotion to his fiancée.
21	6	"The Wedding"	19 September 2017
After a brief wedding ceremony for Grindah and Miche, the families make their way to the reception, which has been turned into a daytime rave. Meanwhile, Steves returns to the radio station, where he finds that police are confiscating the radio equipment. Steves is arrested for drug possession.

=== Series 5 (2018) ===
No. overall	No. in season	Title	Original release date
22	1	"Car Boot"	12 November 2018
The set for Kurupt FM has been raided, and the crew (plus Chabuddy) pawn their way to get back their equipment and get Kurupt FM back on air. Meanwhile, Steves is on community service, and Miche and Grindah's estate is due for development which means they may be relocated outside London.
23	2	"Internet Radio"	19 November 2018
Kurupt FM adjust themselves to the world of live streaming, although Grindah struggles to accept criticism from viewers online. Beats helps Craig move and get acquainted with the ladies at university, and Miche attempts to sabotage Angel's relationship with a friend whilst trying to keep the threat of moving away from Grindah.
24	3	"Music Video"	26 November 2018
The Kurupt FM lot decide to film a music video for Heart Monitor Riddem — which is set to be their big break — and enlist Chabuddy as director, but when his vision doesn't go to plan they are forced to improvise. The stakes have never been higher for Beats, while Miche and Roche travel to Essex to view a potential flat.
25	4	"Definitely Asthma"	3 December 2018
Grindah and Miche take a visit to the GP, as Grindah is convinced he has asthma whenever moving away is mentioned. Steve's probation officer visits and the rest of the crew go out their way to hide any evidence of the radio's existence. Meanwhile, things aren't looking up for Chabuddy, who gets fired from the electronics store, and starts to question his dubious relationship with Carol.
26	5	"Getting Old"	10 December 2018
It's Grindah's birthday and Miche has planned a meal with the whole gang. Keen to prove they're not getting old and out of touch, the Kurupt boys plan an impromptu screening of their music video at a student party. Steves helps Chabuddy drown his sorrows and discovers his community service has some perks.
27	6	"Outro"	17 December 2018
It's the end of Kurupt FM, and as Grindah bids farewell to Brentford, Beats has planned a final send-off before his big move. Miche has high expectations for her leaving do at the salon and Chabuddy starts up a new business venture. Steves reaps the benefits of his new gardening skills and gains a new flatmate.

== Reception ==
=== Critical response ===
People Just Do Nothing has received positive reviews. After the release of the first series, Alex Fletcher of Digital Spy called it "the best British comedy in years", and lamented that few people were aware of its "comedic genius". He added, "it packs in more genuine belly laughs in one episode than most recent sitcoms have done in their full lifetime, and [has] nailed that quintessential British sense of humour where we're able to laugh at our own humiliating inadequacies ... it feels like it belongs in the company of modern comedy greats such as The Office, Peep Show and Phoenix Nights." Gerard O'Donovan of The Telegraph gave the pilot episode four stars out of five, and said, "Entertaining, and absolutely of its time, People Just Do Nothing certainly serves up some good laughs and I look forward to the next three parts."

For the second series, David Renshaw of The Guardian said it was "a welcome return from the gang", and commented "Despite its larger-than-life characters, People Just Do Nothing’s success lies in its believability ... You get the feeling that if you drove out to Brentford you might actually run in to them." He especially praised the comedy provided by DJ Steves and Chabuddy G. Rachel Aroesti, also of The Guardian, said "the episode where Grindah panics after taking a pill at his club night has good claim to be the comic highlight of 2015".

Aroesti gave the third series a highly positive review: "In an age of bleak comedy that barely makes you snigger, one show has been keeping up the lost art of making people laugh – the hilarious, half-witted pirate radio mockumentary." She added, "[the show] is not an old-fashioned sitcom by any stretch – it’s understated, meta and set in a niche subculture – but it is truly traditional in its comedy: beats are hit and joke quotas filled, scene in, scene out." She appreciated that the series also "decided to go for the dramatic jugular. The final episode of this series offered fans a precious opportunity to laugh and cry at exactly the same time ... By making you care about the characters (even the monstrosity that is MC Grindah – a David Brent with malicious intent), viewers will now have two reasons for tuning in."

=== Awards and nominations ===
Year	Award	Category	Nominee(s)	Result	Ref
2016	BAFTA Television Awards	Best Scripted Comedy	People Just Do Nothing	Nominated	
2016	Royal Television Society Awards	Best Scripted Comedy	People Just Do Nothing	Nominated	
2016	Royal Television Society Awards	Best Director – Comedy	Jack Clough	Won	
2017	BAFTA Television Awards	Best Scripted Comedy	People Just Do Nothing	Won	
2017	BAFTA Television Awards	Best Male Comedy Performance	Asim Chaudhry	Nominated	
2017	Royal Television Society Awards	Best Scripted Comedy	People Just Do Nothing	Won	
2017	Royal Television Society Awards	Best Comedy Performance	Asim Chaudhry	Won	
2017	Writers' Guild of Great Britain Awards	Best TV Situation Comedy	Allan Mustafa, Steve Stamp	Nominated	
2018	Royal Television Society Awards	Best Scripted Comedy	People Just Do Nothing	Nominated	
2018	BAFTA Television Awards	Best Male Comedy Performance	Asim Chaudhry	Nominated	

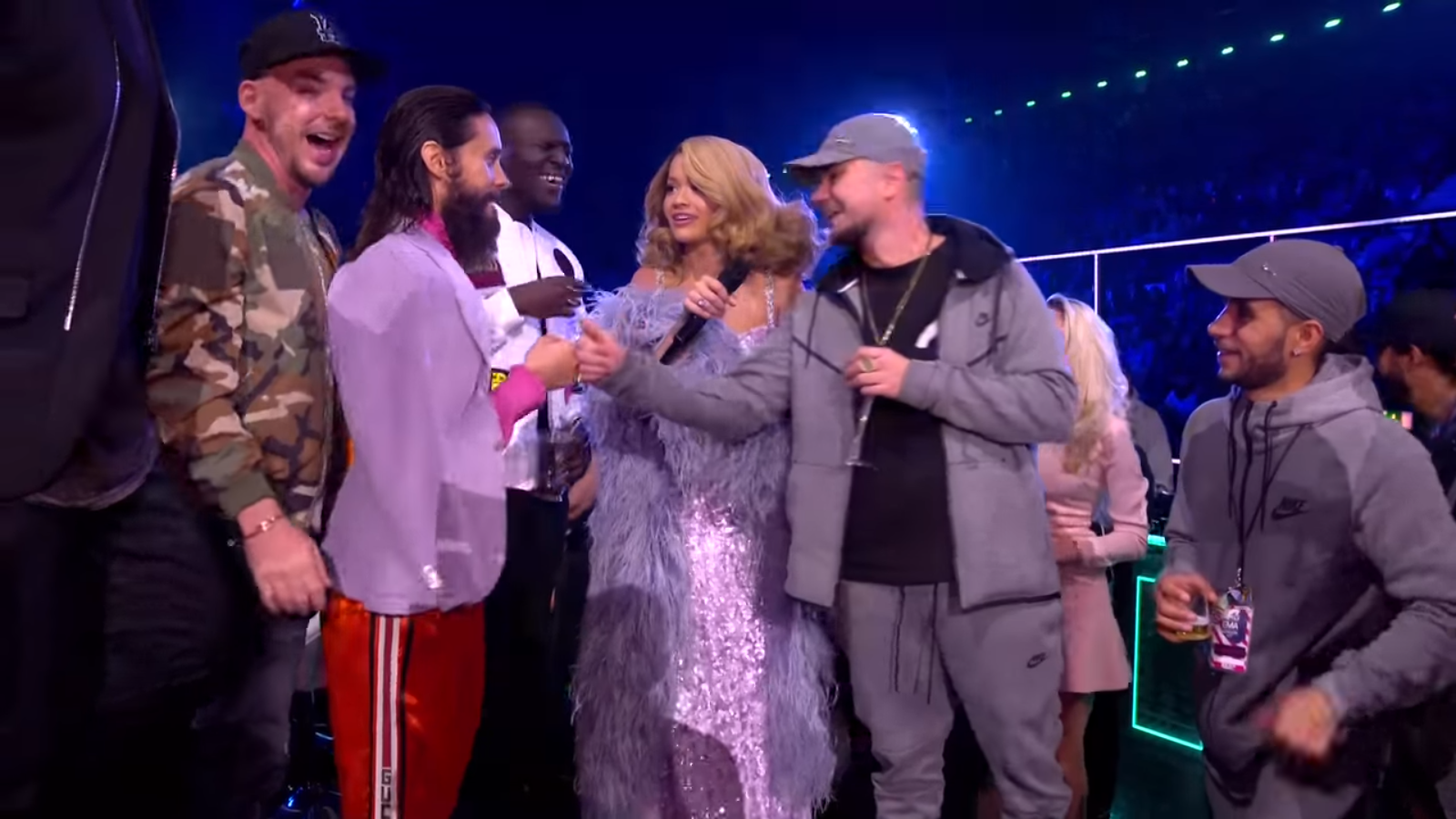
Kurupt FM at the 2017 MTV EMAs

== Broadcast history ==
The show started life in 2010 as "Wasteman TV", a YouTube series that was filmed and edited by Asim Chaudhry (Chabuddy G) before the BBC commissioned a pilot on 17 August 2012, which became the most shared iPlayer show for the month. A four-part series was eventually commissioned, which first aired on iPlayer in July 2014, then on terrestrial television the following month. A second series, of five episodes, aired in July 2015.

In October 2015, the BBC announced it had commissioned a third and fourth series of People Just Do Nothing, both consisting of six 30-minute episodes. The BBC confirmed Series 3 & 4 would initially be available on the new online BBC Three and later screened on BBC Two.

Episode one of series three premiered on BBC iPlayer on 17 August 2016. Episodes of series three were released weekly on iPlayer and then broadcast the following week on BBC Two. Series four began on iPlayer on 15 August 2017, and was also broadcast on BBC One on Saturday evenings.

=== International release ===
In Australia, the series premiered on 12 August 2015 on Channel [V]. In the US, the show premiered on Viceland on 2 February 2017. The show was also added to Netflix US in May 2017. In Canada, the show premiered on CBC Gem on January 14, 2022.

In 2018, Amazon ordered a pilot episode for a U.S remake of the series, set in Las Vegas around a DJ crew called 'Whet Desert' In 2020 it was announced that the project would not be going forward.

=== Home media ===
The DVD of the first three series was released in November 2016. The boxset included specially recorded commentaries from the first two series and unseen extra footage.

=== Music videos ===
Year	Song title	Album	Artist(s)
2017	"On My Mind"	Non-album single	Jorja Smith and Preditah
2021	"Summertime"	Non-album single	Craig David

== Kurupt FM live ==
The four main actors, along with "Decoy" and "Fantasy", tour nightclubs and music venues as "Kurupt FM", where they appear in character. They have also played music festivals including Glastonbury and Reading and Leeds. Mustafa said in 2016, "We all wanted to be musicians when we were younger. So now, in a way, it's like we're living out what we didn't get to do, playing all these festivals. We get two sick jobs: we get to film and we get to fuck around on stage and be headliners." Stamp added, "And because we're in character, we can sort of get away with whatever. Like my shit mixing; it's because I'm Steves, not because I'm a shit DJ." On-stage guests have included artists Stormzy and Big Narstie.

On 22 April 2022 "Kurupt FM" released a live concert stream of their sold-out performance at Printworks, London. The 90 minute show was made available to watch on demand for 2 years by streaming service On Air.

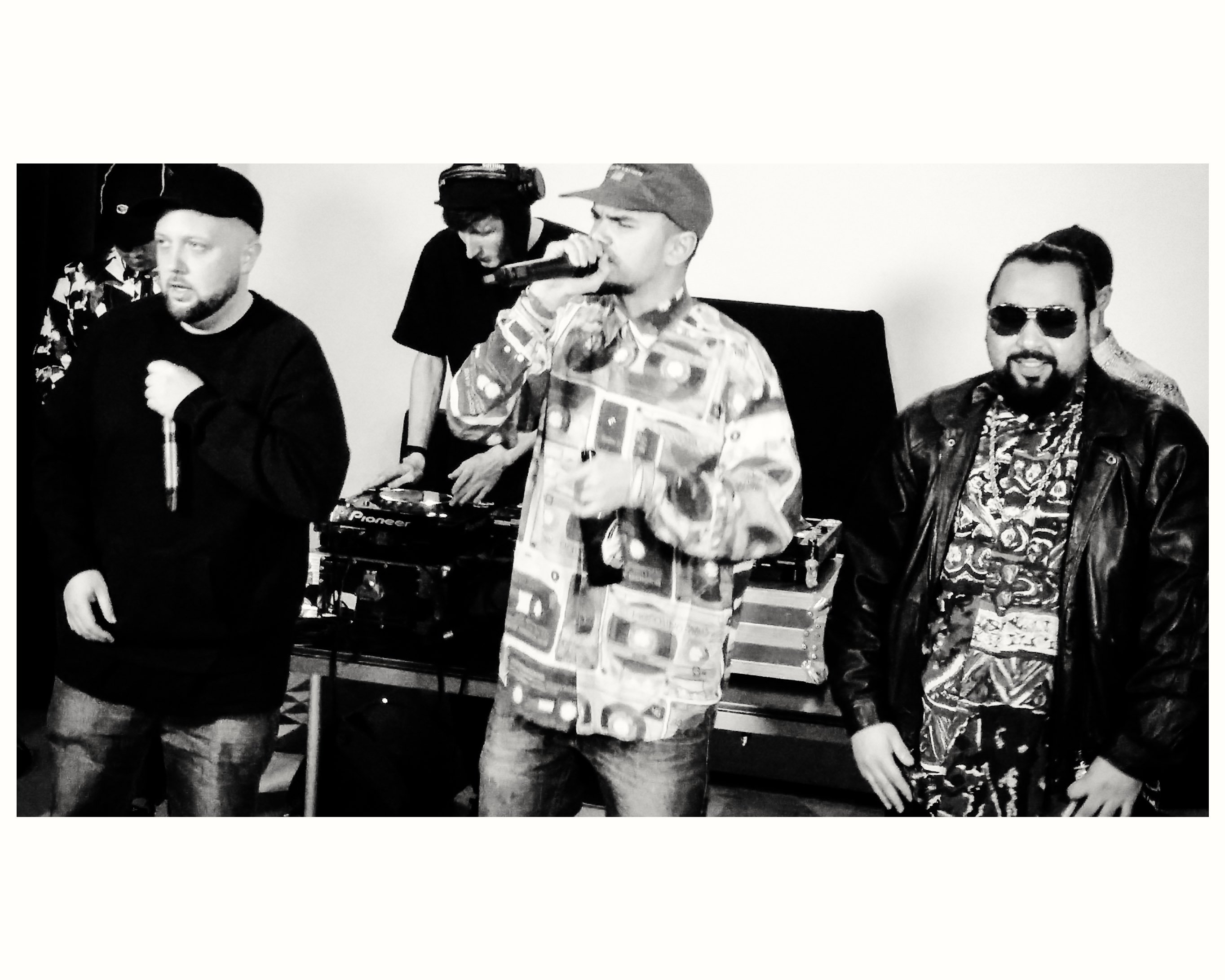
Kurupt FM at Tate Britain

== Film adaptation ==
It was announced that a film adaptation, directed by TV-show-director Jack Clough, would be produced, with filming on location in Japan. The film was released in the UK, with a 15 certificate, on 18 August 2021, to a largely positive reception by the public. Film critics were less appreciative. Kevin Maher of The Times gave the film 2/5 and was concerned about the Japanese stereotypes — "Eventually it starts to feel like lowest-common-denominator humour". The Guardian gave it 3 out 5 commenting "The result is an amiable if unambitious showbiz satire, somewhere between The Office and Spinal Tap although not as groundbreaking as either". Bob Mann of One Mann's Movies reflected the views of someone who has not seen the TV version, something that he comments will be key to the box office success of the movie. Giving the movie 3.5 out of 5, he commented that "as a PJDN virgin, I still laughed a lot!".

== Kurupt FM discography ==
The show's creators have also released music in character as Kurupt FM to coincide with the show.

In May 2017, grime artist Grim Sickers released an 'All Star Remix' of his song "Kane", featuring guest verses from Kurupt FM, Jaykae, Funky Dee, President T and P Money. Kurupt FM also appear in the music video.

On 17 November 2017, Kurupt FM released The Lost Tape on XL Recordings, a mixtape featuring the group performing over classic UK garage productions. The mixtape spawned two singles: "Suttin Like That" and "It's a Kuruption Ting", a collaboration with Scott Garcia. The Lost Tape was also released with a companion mockumentary film on Vice, featuring guest appearances from Craig David, Mike Skinner and P Money.

In 2020, Asim Chaudhry released a single titled "Rig Doctor" in character as Chabuddy G. The song was originally released on Chaudhry's YouTube page in 2014. Chabuddy G has also appeared on albums by Big Narstie and Riz Ahmed.

On 20 August 2021, the group released their debut album The Greatest Hits (Part 1) following the release of their film Big in Japan earlier in the week. The release of the lead single "Summertime", featuring Craig David, preceded the record in May 2021. The album is referenced in the film and features collaborations with Mist, Jaykae, D Double E and General Levy, amongst others.

The Greatest Hits (Part 1) reached number eight on the UK Albums Chart.

=== Albums ===
- The Greatest Hits (Part 1) (2021) — UK No. 8

=== Mixtapes ===
- The Lost Tape (2017)

=== Music videos ===
- "Get Out the Way" (MC Sniper featuring DJ Beats) (2011)
- "A Dis One" (2015)
- "Suttin Like That" (2017)
- "Heart Monitor Riddem" (2018)
- "Summertime" (featuring Craig David) (2021)
- "Dreaming" (featuring Jaykae and Mist) (2021)
- "Your Mum Loves Garage" (2021)
- "Aldona" (Chabuddy G) (2021)
