= List of Outnumbered episodes =

Outnumbered is a British television sitcom created by Andy Hamilton and Guy Jenkin, and broadcast on BBC One. The series stars Claire Skinner and Hugh Dennis as the parents of three headstrong children (played by Tyger Drew-Honey, Daniel Roche and Ramona Marquez), while attempting to navigate everyday life. It also features Samantha Bond and David Ryall in supporting roles. Hamilton and Jenkin also wrote, directed and produced the series for its entire run.

During the course of the programme, 36 episodes of Outnumbered aired, including five specials over five series, between 28 August 2007 and 26 December 2024.

== Series overview ==
Series
Series	Episodes	Originally released		Ave. UK viewers (millions)
Series	Episodes	First released	Last released	Ave. UK viewers (millions)
1	6	28 August 2007	5 September 2007	2.46
2	7	15 November 2008	27 December 2008	4.39
Special		27 December 2009		5.98
3	6	8 April 2010	20 May 2010	6.34
4	6	2 September 2011	7 October 2011	5.32
Special		24 December 2011		8.47
Special		24 December 2012		9.39
5	6	29 January 2014	5 March 2014	6.08
Special		26 December 2016		7.03
Special		26 December 2024		7.41

== Episodes ==
=== Series 1 (2007) ===
The first series was broadcast between 28 August and 5 September 2007.

No. overall	No. in series	Title	Directed by	Written by	Original release date	UK viewers (millions)
1	1	"The School Run"	Andy Hamilton & Guy Jenkin	Andy Hamilton & Guy Jenkin	28 August 2007	2.72
It is Tuesday morning in the Brockman household and also Jake's (Tyger Drew-Honey) first day at secondary school and he does not want to be late, but Pete (Hugh Dennis) has difficulty getting Ben (Daniel Roche) to leave the house as he will not put his father's power drill down to take to a "rearranged" show and tell. Meanwhile, Karen (Ramona Marquez) has nits and wants to keep one as a pet, and Sue (Claire Skinner) is worried about Ben's lying. Karen and Ben fight over the dinosaur book after Karen insists it is one of "her days" for it. Debut: Sue, Pete, Jake, Ben, Karen
2	2	"The Special Bowl"	Andy Hamilton & Guy Jenkin	Andy Hamilton & Guy Jenkin	29 August 2007	2.34
Ben, whose lying is getting out of control, brings his friend Deion (Reuben Lee) round. Meanwhile, Karen refuses, despite Pete's efforts, to eat dinner because it is not in her special bowl, which unbeknownst to her has been accidentally broken by Sue (she had to get a replacement bowl in IKEA). Pete is in trouble at school after a Turkish parent complained about a racist joke involving Ramadan made to his overweight son Kamal which Pete explains it was not his fault. Sue is annoyed when her sister, Auntie Angela (Samantha Bond), arrives having been in the United States for some time after she assumes she will only stay for a short time, then return to "find herself". Debut: Auntie Angela; guest: Deion
3	3	"The City Farm"	Andy Hamilton & Guy Jenkin	Andy Hamilton & Guy Jenkin	30 August 2007	2.37
It is Karen's birthday and the whole family, including Auntie Angela and Grandad (David Ryall), are treated to a typically stressful day at an urban farm after school. Sue gets increasingly irritated during a traffic jam which they got caught up in after Auntie Angela and Grandad made them late, Karen and Ben argue over who gets to pee in a plastic container while bursting for the toilet (along, it turns out, with Grandad), Karen continues to reject Auntie Angela's attempts at bribery and when Grandad gets lost Sue's resentment of her sister bubbles over. Meanwhile, Pete continues his struggle with a sensitive fat Turkish boy and his parents while also trying to convince Ben and Karen he is, in fact, not racist. Pete also continues to worry about how Jake is fitting into "big school" and if he is being bullied. In the gift shop Ben wants a toy truck, a fridge tool, and moans that Karen has £10 (her birthday money), and he only has £3. Ben has a tantrum over a Bruder digger toy, and repeatedly calls Pete a stranger, and tells them he is not called Ben. Karen notices some purple bruises on Jake's arm but he asks her not to tell anyone and keep it as "their little secret". When the family return home, despite the havoc they caused in the gift shop, Pete and Sue seem reasonably happy with how the day went; although their mood quickly changes when Pete realises Ben has stolen a cute, white rabbit from the farm. Debut: Grandad, The Head
4	4	"The Quiet Night In"	Andy Hamilton & Guy Jenkin	Andy Hamilton & Guy Jenkin	3 September 2007	2.39
Pete and Sue want a night to themselves, but delays constantly arise. Pete watches Ben playing football and Ben insists he is the best player in the school team. Karen has a friend, Alexa (Danni Benattar), round whose mother Jane (Hattie Morahan) is very late picking her up and then stays for a drink. Auntie Angela then turns up and asks for the spare keys to their father's house. Jake's form tutor rings and tells Pete he is being bullied. Debut: Jane, Alexa
5	5	"The Mystery Illness"	Andy Hamilton & Guy Jenkin	Andy Hamilton & Guy Jenkin	4 September 2007	2.58
Sue has problems fixing the waste disposal unit, whilst being overworked by Veronica. Ben falsely claims to have a mystery illness (bovine TB at one point) and claims to be far too ill to go to school. Auntie Angela's American boyfriend Trent dumps her, so the family rally round to cheer her up in the best way they know how, having Chinese whilst talking about Nazis and "ratbags". Pete worries that he could be out of a job when his little problem at the school becomes public knowledge through journalists. Pete finds out that Jake's phone was stolen by a bully and he tries to ring the school, but Jake begs him not to, saying that he can handle it.
6	6	"The Dinner Party"	Andy Hamilton & Guy Jenkin	Andy Hamilton & Guy Jenkin	5 September 2007	2.37
Tired of her mother's nagging, Karen decides to leave home for Spain, Greenland or possibly Dorking, while Jake's issue with bullying is resolved. Pete and Sue prepare for a dinner party with the help of Ben, who gets his first taste of alcohol, and their friends Ravi and Kuj arrive. The dinner party turns out to be a bit of a disaster, after Auntie Angela reveals she is once again leaving to return to America. This causes a loud argument with her and Sue, in which they call "The Sauce". After Auntie Angela leaves, Sue cries to herself on the sofa and Ben comes to comfort her. Eventually the whole family are down on the sofa, and refuse to go to bed until Pete does his "thing". Guest: Ravi and Kuj

=== Series 2 (2008) ===
The second series of Outnumbered began on 15 November 2008. New characters in the second series include Barbara (Lorraine Pilkington), the next door neighbour who is meant to be brilliant at raising her children and always highlights Sue's problems, and Jo, a female friend of Jake's, played by Michaela Brooks. Pete and Sue are suspicious that Jo may actually be Jake's girlfriend, although there is no evidence to suggest that Jake and Jo are more than friends. Angela appears less prominently in the second series than in the first, although she still appears in the first episode. Grandad becomes more of a regular, appearing in 5 episodes. Sue's demanding boss, unseen character Veronica, is replaced by another unseen character, Sue's charming new boss Tyson, who Pete is suspicious of. It is revealed in the final episode of Series 2 that he is a conman.

No. overall	No. in series	Title	Directed by	Written by	Original release date	UK viewers (millions)
7	1	"The Wedding"	Andy Hamilton & Guy Jenkin	Andy Hamilton & Guy Jenkin	15 November 2008	3.83
Cousin Julie (Olivia Poulet) is getting married. However, trouble comes when "executive bridesmaid" Karen asks her troubling questions about her previous boyfriends (one exception is a woman called Ulrika). Ben asks the vicar (Rhashan Stone) complex theological questions involving Jesus and lasers, while Pete catches Ben dipping unsuitable things into the chocolate fountain. Karen is worried that Sue will get put in jail after kicking Auntie Angela's backside at the wedding reception for insulting her family (Angela tells Julie that Jake is "probably gay", Karen is "spoiled" and "manipulative", Ben is a "trainee psychotic" and Pete is "weaker than a nun's piss"). Guests: Cousin Julie, Vicar
8	2	"The Dead Mouse"	Andy Hamilton & Guy Jenkin	Andy Hamilton & Guy Jenkin	22 November 2008	3.63
Karen mourns the death of a mouse killed by Sue while trying to understand the need for Gordon Ramsay's swearing, Ben bribes his classmates with his pocket money for their votes when he stands for election as class rep and Jake causes Sue to worry when he brings a female friend (Michaela Brooks) home for tea. Meanwhile, Pete and Sue have to worry about money, chest pains, their single friend Jane who is using them as a free babysitting service, and the superior mother next door (Lorraine Pilkington). Debut: Barbara, Jo
9	3	"The Old-Fashioned Sunday"	Andy Hamilton & Guy Jenkin	Andy Hamilton & Guy Jenkin	29 November 2008	3.48
Sue and Pete ban television as they attempt to have a traditional family Sunday playing games such as hide-and-seek, Pelmanism and scissors, paper, velociraptor, but matters are complicated when Grandad comes to stay after he suffers an accident involving a tin of baked beans. Later, Pete worries about teaching sex education, Karen plays the recorder, and Ben's headmaster suggests that he should take a few days off school (the headmaster is actually trying to keep Ben away from the Ofsted inspectors, who is visiting the same week; much to Sue's outrage, seeing Ben as always being the scapegoat).
10	4	"The Airport"	Andy Hamilton & Guy Jenkin	Andy Hamilton & Guy Jenkin	6 December 2008	4.23
Pete and Sue find themselves trapped in their own living nightmare – stuck in a Spanish airport for hours with three bored children and an increasingly senile grandfather. Karen asks Pete about al-Qaeda and comes up with some ideas to stop terrorism, Jake and Ben drink a double espresso and cause trouble (with a game that involves naming the most explosives), an accident or two involving an elderly woman (Liz Crowther) occurs, Pete and Ben get stopped by security and Grandad goes missing.
11	5	"The Night Out"	Andy Hamilton & Guy Jenkin	Andy Hamilton & Guy Jenkin	13 December 2008	3.88
The parents plan to have a quiet night out and leave the kids with Draxi, a Croatian babysitter (Anna Koval), but Karen thinks that they are being financially irresponsible. Sue is pleased with her new boss, Ben is refused entry to Karen's imaginary restaurant, Jake is advised by Grandad not to invade Russia, and it is discovered that Pete has been doing something unsettling on the internet. Final appearance: Jo; guest: Draxi the Babysitter
12	6	"The Football Match"	Andy Hamilton & Guy Jenkin	Andy Hamilton & Guy Jenkin	20 December 2008	6.87
Ben falls foul of a hardline football referee, while Karen becomes worried about the exact whereabouts of Satan. Sue continues to battle against the supermum next door, Pete is asked to write Northview Secondary School's draft prospectus (propaganda), and Grandad is alarmed to see Gillian McKeith looking down people's toilets on TV.
13	7	"The Long Night"	Andy Hamilton & Guy Jenkin	Andy Hamilton & Guy Jenkin	27 December 2008	4.86
The family have a restless night after Ben has a visit to casualty (again) after playing his "vampire bat game". Karen is writing a letter to the prime minister asking for her teacher to be fired. Jake is asked to cover for Jo by lying to her father that she is round at his house. As the night goes on, Sue gets some upsetting news concerning her dream boss, disturbing noises come from next door and there is a visit from the police. After Pete's attempts to become the new head of history, he ultimately fails because of his incompetence. Final appearances: Barbara, The Head

=== Christmas special (2009) ===
No. overall	Title	Directed by	Written by	Original release date	UK viewers (millions)
14	"The Robbers"	Andy Hamilton & Guy Jenkin	Andy Hamilton & Guy Jenkin	27 December 2009	5.98
Karen worries about her missing class hamster, and wants Pete to pull the floorboards up to see if it is under them. Ben plays with his mechanical disembodied hand. Karen questions Jane's (who actually turns up early for lunch much to Pete's shock) Christmas present to the family - a goat which has been given to people in Sub-Saharan Africa. It is Boxing Day in the Brockman household and Father Christmas has paid a visit, along with some burglars. Karen is worried that the burglars will return. When they visit the retirement home, Sue and Jake are worried after Grandad (Frank) and his friend Mack (Jake D'Arcy) from the home (which they call "Colditz") go missing. Sue finds them together in a pub and brings them to the house for lunch with the family and Jane. The family play "Headbands", Karen does a drawing for Granddad, and Mack teaches Karen Scottish, says that he was a security consultant for ten years, and a burglar for twenty years. Then they play "Who Am I" and Ben makes a guess which is absolutely impossible to answer. The police come and they found a man called Frank, but it is not Grandad. Guest: Mack, Frank (lost man)

=== Series 3 (2010) ===
The third series started on 8 April 2010 at 9:30pm – 10:00pm on BBC One. Series 3 introduces Pete's mother Sandra, who has a gambling problem, in the first two episodes. Another new recurring character throughout the series is Kelly (Anna Skellern), a young woman who lives nearby on whom Jake has a crush. Auntie Angela also returns for one episode. Granddad, Barbara and Jo all fail to make reappearances, and the same can be said for recurring character Jane (who has previously appeared in one episode of each series and the Christmas special), however, she was mentioned obliquely in episode 2 when Jake says "Jane" is on the phone, and has to tell Pete "not annoying Jane" before he would take the call. This series averaged 4.99 million viewers. The series finale aired on 20 May 2010.

A recurring concept throughout the series is the family planning to move house, although this came to nothing, as in Series 4 they are still living in the same house.

Episode 4 was broadcast on 6 May 2010. It was delayed by a week due to the 2010 Prime Ministerial Debate on BBC1.

No. overall	No. in series	Title	Directed by	Written by	Original release date	UK viewers (millions)
15	1	"The Family Outing"	Andy Hamilton & Guy Jenkin	Andy Hamilton & Guy Jenkin	8 April 2010	6.70
Gran (Rosalind Ayres) takes the Brockman family for a day out seeing the sights of London. Ben thinks up a new game ("spot the chav" and later, "spot the lesbian"), Karen is unimpressed with modern art, Jake suffers serious trauma when he is unable to text and gets moody with Pete, Pete uses a visit to HMS Belfast for a brief re-enactment of World War II and Sue is embarrassed twice during trips to the toilet. Gran asks Sue to accept a cheque for £3,000 and Karen asks questions on what the trip has to do with World War II for her project. Debut: Gran
16	2	"The Internet"	Andy Hamilton & Guy Jenkin	Andy Hamilton & Guy Jenkin	15 April 2010	5.82
When Sue finds an inappropriate image of a woman's breasts on the family computer, Pete and Sue investigate. Pete is horrified at the thought of having a heart to heart with Gran. Ben and Karen wrongly believe that the family have won £500,000 and start to spend it. The ancient game of chess will never be quite the same again after Ben brings his own special talents to it at a chess tournament. Gran reveals she has a gambling addiction, and Karen recreates Britain's Got Talent.
17	3	"The Tennis Match"	Andy Hamilton & Guy Jenkin	Andy Hamilton & Guy Jenkin	22 April 2010	6.37
Karen recreates The Apprentice, Ben takes a close interest in Pete's medical tests and Sue thinks Jake's healthy interest in girls is becoming too focused on their looks. Pete finally gets to play tennis with friends after a double booking occurs, but after a substitute player (Michael Fenton Stevens), Karen and Ben turn up, it all ends in a big argument. Debut: Kelly; guest: Frankie, Rick, Lance
18	4	"The Pigeon"	Andy Hamilton & Guy Jenkin	Andy Hamilton & Guy Jenkin	6 May 2010	5.90
Pete is suffering from a terrible hangover from a work party the night before, and it seems worse as he struggles against a rising tide of superstition, astrology and conspiracy theories that seem to be taking over the family. Karen does not want to go to school because of today being Friday the 13th. Ben takes time off from re-enacting the Crusades at school to show some potential buyers (Abdul Salis and Katy Wix) around the house, while Sue tries to get rid of a pigeon that has flown into the house. Guest: Melanie
19	5	"The Restaurant"	Andy Hamilton & Guy Jenkin	Andy Hamilton & Guy Jenkin	13 May 2010	6.75
Auntie Angela has returned from America yet again but this time it is for a visit with her new American husband Brick and his daughter Taylor-Jean, and they are having dinner with the family. However, before they arrive, Sue discovers Pete kissed another woman at a co-worker's leaving party in a drunken state. Auntie Angela and Brick arrive and they head to the restaurant. Pete and Sue do their best to ensure Auntie Angela does not find out about the incident but it is thoughtlessly revealed by Ben, who overheard the conversation. This leads to Pete and Brick supposedly fighting and Karen worrying that Pete and Sue will be getting a divorce. Sue informs Karen this would not happen but reveals at the very end of the episode she only said it to make her feel better, according to Jake. Guest: Brick, Taylor-Jean
20	6	"The Hospital"	Andy Hamilton & Guy Jenkin	Andy Hamilton & Guy Jenkin	20 May 2010	6.51
Pete and Sue struggle to put things right between them, and Karen is unimpressed by their behaviour. Karen is worried by her vital role in the school concert, while Ben is busy recreating the assault on Everest on the stairs. Karen is knocked down by a car and is taken to hospital, resulting in Kelly (Anna Skellern) having to look after Jake and Ben. Jake unwittingly reveals his feelings for Kelly. Final appearance: Kelly

=== Series 4 (2011) ===
The fourth series started on Friday 2 September 2011 at 9:00pm on BBC One. A Christmas Special has also been filmed.

No. overall	No. in series	Title	Directed by	Written by	Original release date	UK viewers (millions)
21	1	"The Funeral"	Andy Hamilton & Guy Jenkin	Andy Hamilton & Guy Jenkin	2 September 2011	6.11
The Brockman family have some tough decisions to make about work, video games and whom to take to a family funeral of his uncle Bob, whom he has to write a eulogy for that omits Bob's gay partner Bernard. The vicar (John Sessions) probably wishes none of them had ever come. Sue has a giggling fit during the service due to a memory of her mother, and it is revealed that Pete has "resigned" from his job as a history teacher.
22	2	"The Girls' Day Out"	Andy Hamilton & Guy Jenkin	Andy Hamilton & Guy Jenkin	9 September 2011	5.37
Sue has enough of the boys' lazy attitude to housework so sets out on a campaign to civilise them (as she goes to the shopping centre with Karen), resulting in Ben making a "gargantuan salad" for tea, that involves the use of Toblerone and a blender. Karen battles with chuggers and buying shoes, while Pete tries to fix the washing machine.
23	3	"The Labrador"	Andy Hamilton & Guy Jenkin	Andy Hamilton & Guy Jenkin	16 September 2011	5.45
Karen goes for a sleepover at her friend Tanya's. Jake is at his mate's for band practice. Ben is away on a school trip to an adventure camp and manages to irritate everyone in the process. Sue and Pete are left with a Labrador to look after and a glimpse of what life will be like once the children have left home. Guest: Archie; debut: Mr. Hunslett
24	4	"The Parents' Evening"	Andy Hamilton & Guy Jenkin	Andy Hamilton & Guy Jenkin	23 September 2011	5.21
There is a lot to discuss at Ben's parents' evening, including muggings, skunk, dangerous chemicals and re-enactments of the Great Plague. Sue is still suspicious Jake is hiding something and Karen decides which of the world's great religions to lead, because of her friend Tanya. Guests: Oliver's parents
25	5	"The Cold Caller (Part 1)"	Andy Hamilton & Guy Jenkin	Andy Hamilton & Guy Jenkin	29 September 2011	5.02
Sue is still convinced Jake has a secret, which turns out to be that he is dating a 19-year-old pole dancer, Victoria. Ben is determined to enter a school talent competition with an unusual double act. Surprise callers Angela and her 15-year-old stepdaughter make life more difficult than usual for the family. Note: The first of a two-part story; this episode aired on a Thursday instead of a Friday Guests: Misty, The Cold Caller
26	6	"The Exchange Student (Part 2)"	Andy Hamilton & Guy Jenkin	Andy Hamilton & Guy Jenkin	7 October 2011	4.78
As the family tries to get rid of Auntie Angela and step-cousin Misty, a wise, tall 15-year-old German exchange student called Ottfried arrives to stay. Sue has to decide what to do about Jake's girlfriend, who turns out to be 16 - and hence too young to be a pole dancer. Ben and Karen discuss dreams, the Mafia and trampolining bears. Final appearance: Mr Hunslett; Guests: Misty, Ottfried, Victoria

=== Christmas special (2011) ===
No.	Title	Directed by	Written by	Original release date	UK viewers (millions)
27	"The Broken Santa"	Andy Hamilton & Guy Jenkin	Andy Hamilton & Guy Jenkin	24 December 2011	8.47
It is Christmas Day and the Brockmans have decided to escape the festivities and head for Tenerife. However, Grandad Frank has been taken ill and is languishing in hospital. Karen has a toothache, so is taken to the dentist. Ben is intent on getting into the Guinness World Records - preferably involving knives. Their ditsy friend Jane and her boyfriend Jason are going to be looking after the house. Pete tells Jane that Jason has served a prison sentence, so after he arrives he argues with Jane and angrily leaves. Sue finds out that it was actually Jane's previous boyfriend, Jeremy, who had been to prison. Sue phones Jane, then Jason, to apologise and explain the misunderstanding. They then realise they may need a lawyer, since Jason is one. As they try to get to the airport, traffic is held up by two Father Christmases having a fight on the road. The Brockmans end up missing their flight, and return home, realising that Jane and Jason are still there. As they prepare to enter the house, Sue acknowledges that since they missed the flight, she would not have to worry about being too far away from her father, who she suddenly decides to visit to avoid facing Jane and Jason. The children quickly follow her to the car. Pete protests at them deliberately avoiding Jane and Jason, before quickly changing his mind and joining them, as they visit Frank in hospital again. Final appearance: Grandad

=== Christmas special (2012) ===
No. overall	Title	Directed by	Written by	Original release date	UK viewers (millions)
28	"The Sick Party"	Andy Hamilton & Guy Jenkin	Andy Hamilton & Guy Jenkin	24 December 2012	9.39
The Brockman family have decided to foster a sense of community spirit by throwing a Christmas party for their neighbours (some of the guests dropped out because of a winter vomiting bug). Festivities do not go as smoothly as planned. Gran springs a surprise visit on the family, an unwell Jane shows up, whilst Jake seems to have fallen in with the wrong crowd. Karen would rather be playing online poker (illegally) than taking part in the celebrations, while Ben is enthusiastically left in charge of the party games, ranging from Swingball to blind football. As the party goes on, Pete gets locked in a bathroom with Jane, a UKIP supporter's marriage falls apart and there is a visit from a police officer. Guests: Norris, Mary, Tatiana, Ray, Jake’s Mates, Police Officer; final appearance: Gran

=== Series 5 (2014) ===
A fifth series of the comedy was commissioned by the BBC on 27 June 2012, despite speculation the show was axed. The fifth series started filming on 22 September 2013, and began airing on BBC One from 29 January 2014. Tyger Drew-Honey and Daniel Roche commented that it would be the final series, which was later confirmed by the BBC.

No. overall	No. in series	Title	Directed by	Written by	Original release date	UK viewers (millions)
29	1	"Rites of Passage"	Andy Hamilton & Guy Jenkin	Andy Hamilton & Guy Jenkin	29 January 2014	6.80
Karen is having trouble adapting to secondary school, Ben is auditioning for a part in the school musical Spartacus and Jake has made a foolish and possibly permanent fashion choice. Meanwhile, Sue and Pete try very hard not to interfere or send disastrously explosive emails.
30	2	"K for Victory"	Andy Hamilton & Guy Jenkin	Andy Hamilton & Guy Jenkin	5 February 2014	6.03
Ben is playing mind games as he becomes fascinated by the world of psychology. Jake, meanwhile, has become a self-appointed parenting expert who likes to point out where Sue and Pete have failed in their upbringing of Karen. Karen is competing in a swimming tournament, where her competitive edge has too much edge. Pete would like to try and control her but he is too busy fending off the attentions of a vigilant Daily Mail reader. Sue is busy battling against a dysfunctional printer.
31	3	"House of Hormones"	Andy Hamilton & Guy Jenkin	Andy Hamilton & Guy Jenkin	12 February 2014	6.00
Pete's highly attractive 21-year-old goddaughter Stacey from Australia gains a lot of attention from the Brockman household. Sue looks after a friend's baby. Sue objects to Jake's girlfriend Alex spending the night in his bedroom. Ben's role in Spartacus: The Musical is under threat. Debut:Stacey
32	4	"Into the Wilderness"	Andy Hamilton & Guy Jenkin	Andy Hamilton & Guy Jenkin	19 February 2014	5.46
Pete and Ben go on a winter camping trip where Ben shows off his survival skills. Jake has to decide about a gap year, just before his imminent UCAS deadline, and Sue has had enough of Stacey, the Australian goddaughter who is still staying and influencing Karen's decisions around food to Sue's displeasure.
33	5	"Communication Skills"	Andy Hamilton & Guy Jenkin	Andy Hamilton & Guy Jenkin	26 February 2014	6.04
Sue struggles to maintain a work life balance (mainly because her children keep going missing) while Pete battles with a mobile phone that has a mind of its own. Meanwhile, Jake is attempting to get home without money or transport, Ben encounters a Chinese horde and Karen has a life-changing conversation with her headmistress. Guests: Rebecca Front as Mrs. Raynott, Harry Shearer as Mr. Johnson
34	6	"Spartacus the Musical"	Andy Hamilton & Guy Jenkin	Andy Hamilton & Guy Jenkin	5 March 2014	6.16
Stacey is back, Ben chickens out of his starring role in Spartacus: The Musical and Karen still hopes her escaped hamster will be found. Auntie Angela returns. Guests: Tommy, Tommy the Hamster; last appearance: Auntie Angela, Stacey

=== Boxing Day special (2016) ===
No. overall	Title	Directed by	Written by	Original release date	UK viewers (millions)
35	"Boxing Day Special"	Andy Hamilton & Guy Jenkin	Andy Hamilton & Guy Jenkin	26 December 2016	7.03
It is Boxing Day and the Brockman family have to carry out a special mission in Grandad's memory, only to get into a car crash and get stuck at a nearby pub. They encounter a series of child problems, parent problems, emotional problems and World War II. Karen becomes convinced that Jill, who was in the other car, is faking whiplash and continuously tries to prove it. Ben is blamed for the crash, as he was driving, and becomes confused over Karen insisting Jake is the "cool" brother. Unbeknownst to his family, Jake has signed a contract for a job in New Zealand. Sue has become attached to Jake's girlfriend Kate and invited her along, unaware of his plans to dump her, and things become complicated when her mum shows up and Pete accidentally tells Kate the truth. Then, as Jake and Pete had alcohol and Sue is injured, Ben has to drive them to Grandad's spot, only to discover it is now the site of a historical re-enactment. Guest stars: Daisy Edgar-Jones, Ruth Madeley, Mark Benton, Katherine Jakeways, Martin Trenaman and Miles Jupp.

=== Boxing Day special (2024) ===
No. overall	Title	Directed by	Written by	Original release date	UK viewers (millions)
36	"Boxing Day Special"	Andy Hamilton & Guy Jenkin	Andy Hamilton & Guy Jenkin	26 December 2024	7.41
Sue and Pete host Christmas in November for their now grown-up children. Sue and Pete work out how to tell their family that Pete has early-stage prostate cancer. Jake is sleep-deprived and arguing with his partner, Rani, the mother of his three-year-old daughter, Zara. Karen has recently quit her job and broken up with her girlfriend, and Ben is preparing to travel. Despite the return of Jane, a dropped beef wellington, and next-door's misdelivered parcels, the family end up in good spirits. Special guests: Kerena Jagpal and Aurora Skarli.

== Comic, Sport Relief & Children in Need specials ==
Title	Running time	Original release date
"Comic Relief Special 2009"	12 minutes	13 March 2009
It is Comic Relief and everyone is doing something funny for money. Sue tries some jokes, Karen draws some bizarre pictures and Ben tries to find what to wear. After their school day Karen raises a lot of money from the retirement home and Sue finally manages to make Jake laugh, but not due to one of her jokes.
"Sport Relief Special 2010"	4 minutes	19 March 2010
Ben presents Pete with his list of things to do for Sport Relief, including shooting things with an air rifle and running the Sport Relief Mile — neither Sue nor Jake appear.
"Comic Relief Special 2011"	5 minutes	18 March 2011
A special mini episode for Comic Relief, guest starring tennis player Andy Murray. Jake spots Andy Murray first and gets a picture with him, Ben gives him tennis tips, Karen questions him about his "proper" job, and Pete accidentally injures him. Sue does not appear in this episode.
"Children In Need Special 2011"	3 minutes	18 November 2011
The three kids sing "(Theme From) The Monkees" whilst moving around the house doing various things. Neither Sue nor Pete appear in the special.
"Sport Relief Special 2012"	7 minutes	23 March 2012
Karen is Frank Lampard's mascot, despite being an Arsenal supporter, because she can be on TV. She begins to discuss his skills and how he could improve at football. This ends up with Frank getting a throbbing blue vein and giving Karen to the referee Howard Webb. Meanwhile, Jake receives numerous autographs from Christine Bleakley, which he plans to sell. In a final scene, an excerpt of Match of the Day, it is recounted that Frank missed five penalties and that Webb made a multitude of errors such as sending off seven players and the Chelsea mascot (presumably Karen) in the first 20 minutes along with punching a fourth official, swallowing his own whistle and having his shorts fall down.
"Children in Need Special 2024"	2 minutes	15 November 2024
The family read out the Children In Need telephone number.
