= Emergency Animal Rescue =

British television show

Emergency Animal Rescue is a British television programme shown on SkyOne presented by Richard Hawley. The concept of the show is a fly-on-the-wall documentary, following RSPCA inspectors.
