= Plastic Man (disambiguation) =

Plastic Man is a superhero from the Golden Age of Comic Books.

Plastic Man may also refer to:

- "Plastic Man" (song), by the Kinks
- Plastic Man (TV series), a two-part British TV drama series from 1999 starring John Thaw and Sorcha Cusack
- Stacey Augmon (born 1968), retired NBA star, with the nickname Plastic Man
- Plastician (born 1982), musician also known as Plasticman
- Richie Hawtin (born 1970), musician also known as Plastikman
- "Plastic Man", a song by The Temptations from Masterpiece, 1973
- "Plastic Man", a song by Seether from Karma and Effect
