= British Academy Television Award for Best Drama Series =

Annual UK television award

British Academy Television Award
- Country: United Kingdom
- Presented by: British Academy of Film and Television Arts
- First award: 1992
- Currently held by: Code of Silence (2026)
- Website: http://www.bafta.org/

The British Academy Television Award for Best Drama Series is one of the major categories of the British Academy Television Awards (BAFTAs), the primary awards ceremony of the British television industry. The category is described on the official BAFTA website as being open to a drama series "of between two and 19 episodes, that is intended to return."

The category has been through several name and category changes:

- From 1958 to 1972 the award was presented usually individually under the name "Best Drama Production".
- Also during the same period another category was awarded briefly as "Best Drama Series" from 1964 to 1970.
- Then from 1970 to 1991 it was joined with drama serials into a category named "Best Drama Series or Serial" with the exception of the years 87, 88 and 89 where it was awarded just as "Best Drama Series".

From 1992 onwards, the category was split in two, with a separate Best Drama Serial category also established.

Inspector Morse, Cracker, The Cops, The Street and Happy Valley have all won the category twice, all except the last in successive years.

== Winners and nominees ==
=== 1950s ===
Best Drama Production

Year	Recipient(s)
1958	Rudolph Cartier
1959	Silvio Narizzano

=== 1960s ===
Best Drama Production

Year	Recipient(s)	Title	Broadcaster
1960	William Kotcheff		
1961	Peter Dews		
1962	Andrew Osborn		
1963	David Rose, Charles Jarrott		
1964	John Jacobs		
1965	Philip Saville		
1966	Peter Hammond	The Count of Monte Cristo	BBC One
1966	Peter Hammond	Contract to Kill	BBC One
1966	Peter Hammond	Hereward The Wake	BBC One
1966	Peter Hammond	Armchair Theatre: "I Took My Little World Away"	BBC One
1966	Peter Hammond	Armchair Mystery Theatre: "Ambrose"	BBC One
1966	Cyril Coke	Play of the Week: "Crime and Punishment", "The Rules of the Game", "Four of Hearts: Tilt"	ITV
1966	Charles Jarrott	Thursday Theatre: "Captain Carvallo", "The Young Elizabeth"	BBC Two
1966	Charles Jarrott	The Wednesday Play: "The Big Breaker"	BBC One
1966	Charles Jarrott	Tea Party	BBC
1966	Production Team	The Wars of the Roses	BBC
1967	Ken Loach		
1968	Ken Loach		
1969	Anthony Page	Play of the Month: "The Parachute"	BBC One

Best Drama Series

Year	Recipient(s)	Title	Broadcaster
1964	Philip Mackie		
1965	Rex Firkin		
1966	Philip Mackie, Silvio Narizzano	Paris 1900	ITV
1966	Philip Mackie, Silvio Narizzano	Play of the Week: "The Changeling", "Women Beware Women"	ITV
1966	Philip Mackie, Silvio Narizzano	Story Parade: "The Old Boys"	BBC One
1966	Philip Mackie, Silvio Narizzano	The Wednesday Thriller: "The Babysitter"	BBC One
1966	Peter Graham Scott	Drama 61-67: "Memory of October"	ATV
1966	Peter Graham Scott	Mogul	BBC
1966	Peter Graham Scott	Redcap	ITV
1966	Peter Graham Scott	Danger Man	ITV
1966	Stella Richman	Upstairs, Downstairs: "Missing Believe Killed"	ITV
1966	Stella Richman	The Hidden Truth: "One of the Hampshire Pargeters"	ITV
1966	Stella Richman	Blackmail: "Take Care of Madam"	ITV
1966	Ralph Smart	Danger Man	ITV
1967	Peter Graham Scott		

=== 1970s ===
Best Drama Production

Year	Title	Recipient(s)	Broadcaster
1970	W. Somerset Maugham: "The Letter"	Christopher Morahan	BBC
1970	ITV Playhouse: "You've Made Your Bed, Now Lie On It"	Christopher Morahan	ITV
1970	Saturday Night Theatre: "Nora"	Christopher Morahan	ITV
1970	Play for Today: "Voyage Round My Father"	Claude Whatham	BBC One
1970	Rembrandt	Rudolph Cartier	BBC
1971	Play for Today: "The Lie"	Alan Bridges	BBC One
1971	Callan	Reginald Collin	ITV
1971	The Wednesday Play: "Mad Jack"	Jack Gold	BBC One
1971	The Roads To Freedom	James Cellan Jones	BBC Two
1971	The Six Wives Of Henry VIII	Ronald Travers, Mark Shivas	BBC Two
1971	The Six Wives Of Henry VIII: "Catherine Of Aragon"	John Glenister	BBC Two
1972	Play for Today: "Edna, The Inebriate Woman"	Ted Kotcheff	BBC One
1972	Cider with Rosie	Claude Whatham	BBC
1972	Eyeless In Gaza	James Cellan Jones	BBC
1972	The Snow Goose	Patrick Garland	BBC
1972	Upstairs, Downstairs: "On Trial"	John Hawkesworth	ITV

Best Drama Series

Year	Title	Recipient(s)	Broadcaster
1970	W. Somerset Maugham	Verity Lambert	BBC
1970	Callan	Reginald Collin	ITV
1970	The Gold Robbers	John Hawkesworth	ITV

Best Drama Series or Serial

Year	Title	Recipient(s)	Broadcaster
1973	Country Matters	Derek Granger	BBC
1973	Upstairs, Downstairs	John Hawkesworth	ITV
1973	Colditz	Gerard Glaister	BBC One
1974	Upstairs, Downstairs	John Hawkesworth	ITV
1974	Country Matters	Derek Granger	BBC
1974	Wessex Tales	Irene Shubik	BBC Two
1974	The Onedin Line	Peter Graham Scott	BBC One
1975	South Riding	James Ormerod	ITV
1975	Shoulder to Shoulder	Verity Lambert	BBC Two
1975	Jennie	James Cellan Jones	ITV
1975	Upstairs, Downstairs	John Hawkesworth	ITV
1976	Edward VII	Cecil Clarke, John Gorrie	ITV
1976	Day of Hope	Tony Garnett, Ken Loach	BBC One
1976	The Sweeney	Ted Childs	ITV
1976	Upstairs, Downstairs	John Hawkesworth	ITV
1977	Rock Follies	Andrew Brown	ITV
1977	The Duchess of Duke Street	John Hawkesworth	BBC One
1977	When the Boat Comes In	Leonard Lewis	BBC One
1977	The Glittering Prizes	Mark Shivas	BBC Two
1977	I, Claudius	Martin Lisemore, Herbert Wise	BBC Two
1978	Marie Curie	Peter Goodchild, John Glenister	BBC
1978	Hard Times	Peter Eckersley, John Irvin	ITV
1978	The Norman Conquests	Verity Lambert, Herbert Wise	ITV
1978	When the Boat Comes In	Andrew Osborn	BBC One
1979	Edward and Mrs Simpson	Andrew Brown, Waris Hussein	ITV
1979	All Creatures Great And Small	Bill Sellars	BBC One
1979	Pennies From Heaven	Kenith Trodd, Piers Haggard	BBC One
1979	Lillie	Jack Williams	ITV

=== 1980s ===
Best Drama Series or Serial

Year	Title	Recipient(s)	Broadcaster
1980	Testament of Youth	Jonathan Powell, Moira Armstrong	BBC Two
1980	Rumpole of the Bailey	Jacqueline Davis	ITV
1980	Telford's Change	Mark Shivas, Barry Davis	BBC One
1980	Tinker Tailor Soldier Spy	Jonathan Powell, John Irvin	BBC Two
1981	Oppenheimer	Peter Goodchild, Barry Davis	BBC Two
1981	Shoestring	Robert Banks Stewart	BBC One
1981	To Serve Them All My Days	Ken Riddington	BBC One
1981	Therese Raquin	Jonathan Powell, Simon Langton	BBC Two
1982	Brideshead Revisited	Derek Granger, Charles Sturridge, Michael Lindsay-Hogg	ITV
1982	The History Man	Michael Wearing, Robert Knights	BBC Two
1982	Private Schulz	Philip Hinchcliffe, Robert Chetwyn	BBC Two
1982	Winston Churchill: The Wilderness Years	Richard Broke, Ferdinand Fairfax	ITV
1983	Boys from the Blackstuff	Michael Wearing, Philip Saville	BBC Two
1983	Minder	Lloyd Shirley, George Taylor	ITV
1983	The Barchester Chronicles	Jonathan Powell, David Giles	BBC Two
1983	Smiley's People	Jonathan Powell, Simon Langton	BBC Two
1984	Kennedy	Andrew Brown, Jim Goddard	ITV
1984	Rumpole of the Bailey	Jacqueline Davis	ITV
1984	Auf Wiedersehen, Pet	Martin McKeand	ITV
1984	Widows	Linda Agran, Ian Toynton	ITV
1985	The Jewel in the Crown	Christopher Morahan, Jim O'Brien	ITV
1985	Tenko	Ken Riddington	BBC One
1985	Minder	Lloyd Shirley, George Taylor	ITV
1985	Auf Wiedersehen, Pet	Martin McKeand	ITV
1986	Edge of Darkness	Michael Wearing, Martin Campbell	BBC Two
1986	Minder	Lloyd Shirley, George Taylor	ITV
1986	Bleak House	John Harris, Betty Willingale, Ross Devenish	BBC Two
1986	The Price	Mark Shivas, Peter Smith	Channel 4

Best Drama Series

Year	Title	Recipient(s)	Broadcaster
1987	The Life and Loves of a She-Devil	Sally Head, Philip Saville	BBC Two
1987	All Passion Spent	Colin Rogers, Martyn Friend	BBC
1987	The Monocled Mutineer	Richard Broke, Jim O'Brien	BBC One
1987	The Singing Detective	Kenith Trodd, John Harris, Jon Amiel	BBC One
1987	Paradise Postponed	Jacqueline Davis, Alvin Rakoff	ITV
1987	A Very Peculiar Practice	Ken Riddington, David Tucker	BBC Two
1988	Tutti Frutti	Andy Park, Tony Smith	BBC Scotland
1988	Fortunes of War	Betty Willingale, James Cellan Jones	BBC One
1988	Porterhouse Blue	Brian Eastman, Robert Knights	Channel 4
1988	A Perfect Spy	Colin Rogers, Peter Smith	BBC Two
1989	A Very British Coup	Alan Plater, Anne Skinner, Sally Hibbin, Mick Jackson	Channel 4
1989	Blind Justice	Peter Flannery, Michael Wearing, Robert Walker, Michael Whyte	BBC One
1989	Talking Heads	Alan Bennett, Innes Lloyd	BBC One
1989	Rumpole of the Bailey	John Mortimer, Jacqueline Davis	ITV

=== 1990s ===
Best Drama Series or Serial

Year	Title	Recipient(s)	Broadcaster
1990	Traffik	Simon Moore, Brian Eastman, Alastair Reid	Channel 4
1990	Inspector Morse	Chris Burt	ITV
1990	Summer's Lease	John Mortimer, Colin Rogers, Martyn Friend	BBC Two
1990	Mother Love	Andrew Davies, Ken Riddington, Simon Langton	BBC One
1991	Oranges Are Not the Only Fruit	Jeanette Winterson, Phillippa Giles, Beeban Kidron	BBC Two
1991	Agatha Christie's Poirot	Brian Eastman	ITV
1991	Inspector Morse	David Lascelles	ITV
1991	House of Cards	Andrew Davies, Ken Riddington, Paul Seed	BBC

Best Drama Series

Year	Title	Recipient(s)	Production company	Broadcaster
1992	Inspector Morse	David Lascelles, Viscount Lascelles	Central Independent Television	ITV
1992	Agatha Christie's Poirot	Brian Eastman	London Weekend Television	ITV
1992	Casualty	Geraint Morris	BBC Bristol	BBC One
1992	Spender	Martin McKeand	BBC Television	BBC One
1993	Inspector Morse	Deirdre Kerr	Central Independent Television	ITV
1993	Between the Lines	Peter Norris	World Productions	BBC One
1993	Casualty	Gerraint Morris	BBC Bristol	BBC One
1993	Jeeves and Wooster	Clive Exton, Brian Eastman, Ferdinand Fairfax	Carnival Films	ITV
1994	Between the Lines	Peter Norris	World Productions	BBC One
1994	Cracker	Gub Neal, Jimmy McGovern	Granada Television	ITV
1994	Casualty	Gerraint Morris, Michael Ferguson	BBC Bristol	BBC One
1994	The Riff Raff Element	Liz Trubridge, Simon Cellan Jones, Jeremy Ancock, Debbie Horsfield	BBC Television	BBC One
1995	Cracker	Paul Abbott	Granada Television	ITV
1995	The Bill	Michael Chapman	Thames Television	ITV
1995	Sharpe	Simon Lewis, Tom Clegg	Central Independent Television	ITV
1995	Common As Muck	John Chapman, William Ivory	BBC Television	BBC One
1996	Cracker	Hilary Bevan Jones	Granada Television	ITV
1996	Preston Front	Chris Griffin, Tim Firth	BBC Television	BBC One
1996	Prime Suspect	Paul Marcus	Granada Television	ITV
1996	A Touch of Frost	Don Leaver	Yorkshire Television	ITV
1997	EastEnders	Corinne Hollingworth, Jane Harris	BBC Television	BBC One
1997	This Life	Jane Fallon	World Productions	BBC Two
1997	Ballykissangel	Joy Lale	BBC Northern Ireland	BBC One
1997	Hamish Macbeth	Deidre Kerr	Skyline Films, Zenith Entertainment Ltd.	BBC One
1998	Jonathan Creek	Susan Belbin, Sandy Johnson, Marcus Mortimer, David Renwick	BBC Television	BBC One
1998	Touching Evil	Jane Featherstone, Paul Abbott	Anglia Television	ITV
1998	Common As Muck	Catherine Wearing, Metin Hüseyin, William Ivory	BBC Television	BBC One
1998	Wing and a Prayer	Jacinta Peel, Richard Laxton, Robin Sheppard, Matthew Hall	Thames Television	Channel 5
1999	The Cops	Eric Coulter, Harry Bradbeer, Alrick Riley	World Productions	BBC Two
1999	Jonathan Creek	Verity Lambert, Keith Washington, David Renwick, Sandy Johnson	BBC Television	BBC One
1999	Playing the Field	Greg Brenman, Catherine Morshead, Paul Seed, Kay Mellor	Tiger Aspect Productions	BBC One
1999	Undercover Heart	Jane Fallon, John Strickland, Richard Signy, Peter Bowker	BBC Television	BBC One

=== 2000s ===
Year	Title	Recipient(s)	Production company	Broadcaster
2000	The Cops		World Productions	BBC Two
2000	Cold Feet	Christine Langan, Mike Bullen	Granada Television	ITV
2000	Playing the Field	Greg Brenman, Hugh Warren, Kay Mellor	Tiger Aspect Productions	BBC One
2000	Psychos		Kudos Film & Television	Channel 4
2001	Clocking Off	Nicola Shindler, Ann Harrison-Baxter, Paul Abbott	Red Production Company	BBC One
2001	The Cops		World Productions	BBC Two
2001	Fat Friends	Kay Mellor, Gareth Morgan	Rollem Productions, Tiger Aspect Productions, Yorkshire Television	ITV
2001	The Sins	Liza Marshall, William Ivory	BBC Television	BBC One
2002	Cold Feet	Andy Harries, Spencer Campbell, Mike Bullen	Granada Television	ITV
2002	Clocking Off	Nicola Shindler, Juliet Charlesworth, Paul Abbott	Red Production Company	BBC One
2002	At Home with the Braithwaites	Carolyn Reynolds, Jacky Stoller, Sally Wainright	Yorkshire Television	ITV
2002	Tales from Pleasure Beach	Madonna Baptiste, Edmund Coulthard, Roger Williams	Blast! Film Productions	BBC Two
2003	Spooks		Kudos Film & Television	BBC One
2003	Teachers	Jane Fallon, Rhonda Smith	Tiger Aspect Productions	Channel 4
2003	Clocking Off		Red Production Company	BBC One
2003	Cutting It	Debbie Horsfield, Diederick Santer, Andy De Emmony	BBC Television	BBC One
2004	Buried		World Productions	Channel 4
2004	Clocking Off		Red Production Company	BBC One
2004	Foyle's War		Greenlit Productions	ITV
2004	William and Mary	Trevor Hopkins, Stuart Orme, Mick Ford	Meridian Broadcasting	ITV
2005	Shameless		Company Pictures	Channel 4
2005	Spooks	Jane Featherstone, Simon Crawford Collins, Andrew Woodhead	Kudos Film & Television	BBC One
2005	Bodies	Mark Redhead, Sue de Beauvoir, Jed Mercurio	Hat Trick Productions	BBC Three
2005	Conviction		Red Production Team	BBC Three
2006	Doctor Who	Phil Collinson, Russell T Davies, Julie Gardner	BBC Wales	BBC One
2006	Bodies	Mark Redhead, Sue de Beauvoir, Jed Mercurio	Hat Trick Productions	BBC Three
2006	Shameless		Company Pictures	Channel 4
2006	Spooks		Kudos Film & Television	BBC One
2007	The Street	Jimmy McGovern, Sita Williams, David Blair, Ken Horn	Granada Productions	BBC One
2007	Shameless		Company Pictures	Channel 4
2007	Sugar Rush		Shine Productions	Channel 4
2007	Life on Mars		Kudos Film & Television	BBC One
2008	The Street	Jimmy McGovern, Sita Williams, Terry McDonough, John Chapman	Granada Productions	BBC One
2008	Rome	John Melfi, Anne Thomopoulos, Bruno Heller, Tim Van Patten	HBO	BBC Two
2008	Life on Mars		Kudos Film & Television	BBC One
2008	Skins		Company Pictures	Channel 4
2009	Wallander	Richard Cottan, Kenneth Branagh, Philip Martin, Francis Hopkinson	Left Bank Pictures, Yellow Bird, TKBC	BBC One
2009	Shameless	Paul Abbott, George Faber, John Griffin, Johann Knobel	Company Pictures	Channel 4
2009	Doctor Who	Phil Collinson, Russell T Davies, Julie Gardner, Susie Liggat	BBC Wales	BBC One
2009	Spooks		Kudos Film & Television	BBC One

=== 2010s ===
Year	Title	Recipient(s)	Production company	Broadcaster
2010	Misfits		Clerkenwell Films	E4
2010	Being Human	Toby Whithouse	Touchpaper Television	BBC Three
2010	Spooks		Kudos Film & Television	BBC One
2010	The Street	Jimmy McGovern, Sita Williams, Roxy Spencer, David Blair	Granada Television	BBC One
2011	Sherlock	Steven Moffat, Mark Gatiss, Sue Vertue, Beryl Vertue	Hartswood Films, BBC Wales	BBC One
2011	Being Human	Rob Pursey, Philip Trethowan, Toby Whithouse, Colin Teague	Touchpaper Television	BBC Three
2011	Downton Abbey	Julian Fellowes, Gareth Neame, Liz Trubridge, Nigel Stafford-Clark	Carnival Films	ITV1
2011	Misfits	Murray Ferguson, Petra Fried, Howard Overman, Kate Crowe	Clerkenwell Films	E4
2012	The Fades	Jack Thorne, Susan Hogg, Caroline Skinner, Farren Blackburn	BBC Television	BBC Three
2012	Misfits	Murray Ferguson, Petra Fried, Howard Overman, Matt Strevens	Clerkenwell Films	E4
2012	Scott & Bailey		Red Production Company	ITV1
2012	Spooks		Kudos Film & Television	BBC One
2013	Last Tango in Halifax	Sally Wainwright, Nicola Shindler, Karen Lewis, Euros Lyn	BBC Television	BBC One
2013	Scott & Bailey		Red Production Company	ITV1
2013	Ripper Street	Richard Warlow, Tom Shankland, Stephen Smallwood, Will Gould	BBC Television	BBC One
2013	Silk	Hilary Salmon, Peter Moffat, Richard Stokes, Jeremy Webb	BBC Television	BBC One
2014	Broadchurch		Kudos Film & Television	ITV
2014	Top of the Lake	Emile Sherman, Iain Canning, Jane Campion, Philippa Campbell	See-Saw Films, Screen Australia	BBC Two
2014	The Village		Company Pictures	BBC One
2014	My Mad Fat Diary		Tiger Aspect Productions	E4
2015	Happy Valley	Sally Wainwright, Karen Lewis, Euros Lyn, Nicola Shindler	Red Production Company	BBC One
2015	Line of Duty	Jed Mercurio, Simon Heath, Peter Norris, Douglas Mackinnon	World Productions	BBC Two
2015	Peaky Blinders		Tiger Aspect Productions	BBC Two
2015	The Missing	Charlie Pattinson, Willow Grylls, Jack Williams, Harry Williams	New Pictures	BBC One
2016	Wolf Hall	Peter Kosminsky, Peter Straughan, Mark Pybus, Colin Callender	Company Pictures	BBC Two
2016	The Last Panthers	Jack Thorne, Johan Renck, Peter Carlton, Caroline Benjo	Warp Films	Sky Atlantic
2016	Humans		Channel 4	Channel 4
2016	No Offence	Paul Abbott, Martin Carr, Anna Ferguson, Catherine Morshead	AbbottVision	Channel 4
2017	Happy Valley	Sally Wainwright, Karen Lewis, Euros Lyn, Nicola Shindler	Red Production Company	BBC One
2017	The Crown		Left Bank Pictures	Netflix
2017	The Durrells		Sid Gentle Films	ITV
2017	War & Peace		The Weinstein Company	BBC One
2018	Peaky Blinders		Tiger Aspect Productions	BBC Two
2018	Line of Duty		World Productions	BBC One
2018	The Crown		Left Bank Pictures	Netflix
2018	The End of the F***ing World		Clerkenwell Films	All 4
2019	Killing Eve		Sid Gentle Films	BBC One
2019	Save Me		World Productions	Sky Atlantic
2019	Bodyguard		World Productions	BBC One
2019	Informer	Jonny Campbell, Rory Haines, Sohrab Noshirvani, Julian Stevens	Neal Street Productions	BBC One

=== 2020s ===
Year	Title	Recipient(s)	Production company	Broadcaster
2020	The End of the F***ing World		Clerkenwell Films	Channel 4
2020	The Crown	Peter Morgan, Suzanne Mackie, Benjamin Caron, Michael Casey	Left Bank Pictures	Netflix
2020	Gentleman Jack	Sally Wainwright, Faith Penhale, Laura Lankester, Phil Collinson	Lookout Point	BBC One
2020	Giri/Haji		Sister	BBC Two
2021	Save Me Too	Simon Heath, Jessica Sykes, Lennie James, Lizzie Rusbridger, Coky Giedroyc, Jim Loach	World Productions	Sky Atlantic
2021	The Crown	Peter Morgan, Suzanne Mackie, Michael Casey, Oona O'Beirn, Andy Stebbing, Martin Harrison	Left Bank Pictures in association with Sony Pictures Television	Netflix
2021	Gangs of London	Gareth Evans, Matt Flannery, Thomas Benski, Jane Featherstone, Lucas Ochoa, Hugh Warren	Pulse Films, Sister	Sky Atlantic
2021	I Hate Suzie	Lucy Prebble, Billie Piper, Andrea Dewsbery, Julie Gardner, Georgi Banks-Davies, Anthony Neilson	Bad Wolf	Sky Atlantic
2022	In My Skin	Kayleigh Llewellyn, Nerys Evans, Molly Manners, Sophie Francis	Expectation Entertainment	BBC Three
2022	Unforgotten		Mainstreet Pictures	ITV
2022	Manhunt: The Night Stalker	Ed Whitmore, Marc Evans, Jo Willett, Evie Bergson-Korn, Philippa Braithwaite	Buffalo Pictures	ITV
2022	Vigil	Tom Edge, Simon Heath, Jake Lushington, Angie Daniell, James Strong, Isabelle Sieb	World Productions	BBC One
2023	Bad Sisters	Sharon Horgan, Dearbhla Walsh, Faye Dorn, Brett Baer, Dave Finkel, Johann Knobel	Merman, ABC Signature	Apple TV+
2023	The Responder	Chris Carey, Laurence Bowen, Tony Schumacher, Tim Mielants, Rebecca Ferguson, Toby Bruce	Dancing Ledge	BBC One
2023	Sherwood	James Graham, Lewis Arnold, Rebecca Hodgson, Juliette Howell, Tessa Ross, Harriet Spencer	House Productions	BBC One
2023	Somewhere Boy	Pete Jackson, Petra Fried, Emily Harrison, Gavin O'Grady, Alex Winckler	Clerkenwell Films	Channel 4
2024	Top Boy		Cowboy Films, Easter Partisan, DreamCrew, SpringHill Entertainment	Netflix
2024	Happy Valley	Sally Wainwright, Sarah Lancashire, Jessica Taylor, Faith Penhale, Will Johnston, Fergus O'Brien	Lookout Point TV	BBC One
2024	The Gold		Tannadice Pictures	BBC One
2024	Slow Horses		See-Saw Films	Apple TV+
2025	Blue Lights	Stephen Wright, Louise Gallagher, Declan Lawn, Adam Patterson, Jack Casey, Amanda Black	Two Cities Television, Gallagher Films	BBC One
2025	Sherwood	James Graham, Clio Barnard, Juliette Howell, Tessa Ross, Harriet Spencer, Kate Ogborn	House Productions	BBC One
2025	Wolf Hall: The Mirror and the Light	Peter Kosminsky, Noëlette Buckley, Susanne Simpson, Peter Straughan, Lisa Osborne, Colin Callender	Playground Entertainment, Company Pictures	BBC One
2025	Supacell	Rapman, Mouktar Mohammed, Steve Searle, Joanna Crown	Netflix, New Wave Agency, It's A Rap	Netflix
2026	Code of Silence	Diarmuid Goggins, Joe Shrubb, Bryony Arnold, Chanya Buttton, Rose Ayling Ellis, Cat Moulton	Mammoth Screen, ITV Studios	ITV
2026	Blue Lights	Stephen Wright, Louise Gallagher, Declan Lawn, Adam Patterson, Jack Casey, Amanda Black	Two Cities Television, Gallagher Films, BBC Studios	BBC One
2026	This City Is Ours	Stephen Butchard, Simon Maloney, Saul Dibb, Rebecca Hodgson, Siân McWilliams, Andy Harries	Left Bank Pictures	BBC One
2026	A Thousand Blows		The Story Collective, Matriarch Productions, Water & Power Productions	Disney+

- Note: The series that do not have recipients on the table had Production team credited as the recipients of the award or nomination.

== Television Dramas with multiple awards nominations ==
=== Multiple awards ===
The following television series have won the British Academy Television Award for Best Drama Series multiple times:

2 awards

- Cracker (consecutive)
- Happy Valley
- The Cops (consecutive)
- The Street (consecutive)

=== Multiple nominations ===
The following television series have been nominated for the British Academy Television Award for Best Drama Series multiple times:

6 nominations

- Spooks

4 nominations

- Clocking Off
- The Crown
- Shameless

3 nominations

- Casualty
- The Cops
- Cracker
- Happy Valley
- Misfits
- The Street

2 nominations

- Being Human
- Between the Lines
- Blue Lights
- Bodies
- Cold Feet
- Common As Muck
- Doctor Who
- The End of the F***ing World
- Inspector Morse
- Jonathan Creek
- Life on Mars
- Line of Duty
- Peaky Blinders
- Playing the Field
- Scott & Bailey
- Sherwood
