= Just William (2010 TV series) =

- Genre: Sitcom
- Based on: Just William by Richmal Crompton
- Written by: Simon Nye
- Directed by: Paul Seed
- Starring: Daniel Roche; Rebecca Front; Daniel Ryan; Lily James; Caroline Quentin; Warren Clarke; Lottie Bell
- Narrated by: Martin Jarvis
- Country of origin: United Kingdom
- Original language: English
- No. of episodes: 4

Production
- Producer: John Chapman
- Running time: 30 mins

Original release
- Network: BBC One, CBBC

Related
- Just William

Just William is a United Kingdom television series first broadcast on BBC One in December 2010. The series is based on the book series of the same name by Richmal Crompton. The adaptation is written by Simon Nye. It is the first adaptation of the books since a children's television series in the 1990s.

The series stars Daniel Roche as the title character, eponymous character William Brown, with Rebecca Front and Daniel Ryan as William's parents. Caroline Quentin and Warren Clarke appear as the parents of Violet Elizabeth Bott (played by Isabella Blake-Thomas), neighbours of the Brown family. It is directed by Paul Seed and produced by John Chapman.

Martin Jarvis, who voices the radio and audio CD adaptations of Just William, acts as the narrator. Various sources suggest that the series will not be returning.

== Background ==
British author Richmal Crompton had a series of books published between 1919 and 1969 about the adventures of schoolboy William Brown and his group of friends, also known as the "Outlaws". Crompton, a schoolteacher, wrote her first novel in 1922 and went on to sell over 12 million copies of her books in the United Kingdom.

The first film adaptation of the novels, titled Just William, was released in 1940, and this was followed by two further films in 1948. A radio series was also broadcast on the BBC around the same period. The books were also adapted for television, firstly as William in the 1960s, then as Just William in the 1970s and again under the same title in the 1990s.

== Production ==
The producers chose to set the film in the 1950s, just following the conclusion of World War II, despite many of the books being written in the preceding three decades. The series was filmed in the Home Counties. The screenplay was written by Simon Nye. Daniel Roche was cast in the title role as William Brown, the main character and leader of "The Outlaws" along with his friends Ginger, Douglas and Henry.

Ten year old Roche had received critical acclaim for his performances as Ben in the BBC comedy series Outnumbered. Isabella Blake-Thomas, who appeared in the BBC Four television film Enid, got the part of Violet Elizabeth Bott, William's neighbour. Due to the setting of the series, Roche had to have his trademark curly hair cut short.

== Cast and characters ==
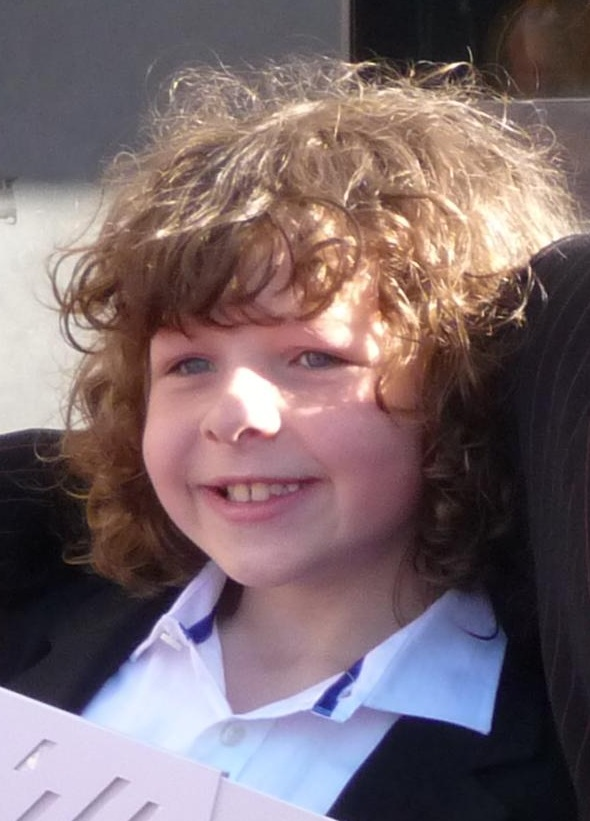
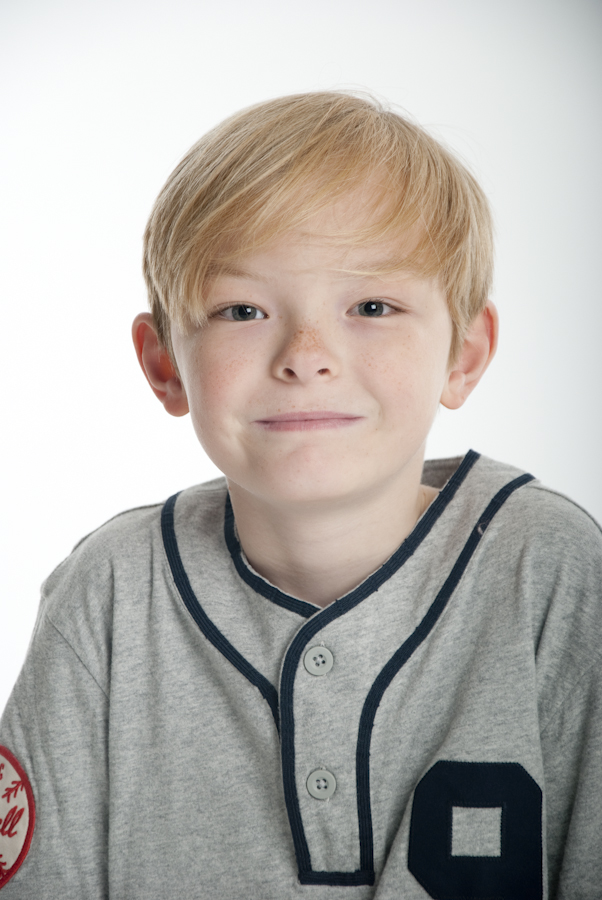
Daniel Roche who plays William; Robert A. Foster who plays Henry
- Daniel Roche as William Brown
- Daniel Ryan as Mr Brown
- Rebecca Front as Mrs Brown
- Lily James as Ethel Brown
- Harry Melling as Robert Brown
- Bertie Carvel as Uncle Neville
- Isabella Blake-Thomas as Violet Elizabeth Bott
- Warren Clarke as Mr Bott
- Caroline Quentin as Mrs Bott
- Jordan Grehs as Ginger
- Edward Piercy as Douglas
- Lottie Bell as Dorinda
- Robert A. Foster as Henry
- Adam Gillen as Hector
- Denis Lawson as Headmaster
- John Sessions as Mr Welbecker
- Roy Hudd as Bob
- Martin Jarvis as the Narrator
- Ruby Stokes as Grumpy Girl

== Broadcast ==
The series, which consists of four half-hour episodes, aired as part of the BBC's Christmas programming from 28 to 31 December 2010 on CBBC on BBC One.< The series was broadcast on the CBBC channel from 8 to 16 January 2011.

== DVD release ==
The first four episodes were released to DVD on 7 March 2011, under the title, Just William, Series One, although further series were not produced.
