= Martin Marquez =

English actor (born 1964)

- Born: Martin Joseph Marquez; 8 October 1964 (age 62); Coventry, West Midlands, England
- Occupations: Television actor, film actor, editor
- Years active: 1991–present
- Children: 5

Martin Joseph Marquez (born 8 October 1964) is an English actor.

He is best known on television for his role as Gino Primirola, the head barman, in the British television comedy drama Hotel Babylon. He also played Danny Pearce in The Bill from 1993 to 1995, and Neil in EastEnders in 2002, and he has appeared in Doc Martin alongside his real life brother John Marquez. He has also appeared in The Catherine Tate Show, Murder Most Horrid, and Plastic Man.

== Early life ==
Marquez was born in Coventry, Warwickshire to a Spanish father and an English mother. Marquez's father formerly worked as a waiter at the Costa Brava Ritz Hotel and later opened a chip shop when the family moved to Binley Woods. Marquez attended King Henry VIII School in Coventry. He worked as a personal trainer and a barman, before beginning his career in acting.

== Career ==
Marquez first appeared on television in The Bill, where he portrayed Detective Sergeant Danny Pearce. He also had small roles in such series as Doc Martin, The Catherine Tate Show, Elizabeth I, The Business, EastEnders and Bedtime. From 2006 to 2009, he played the character of head barman on the television series Hotel Babylon. In 2013, he appeared in new ITV comedy drama The Job Lot, playing security guard Paul.

He is also known for his theatre work, including Trevor Nunn's revival of Anything Goes in 2002, in which he played Moonface Martin and Terry Johnson's play Insignificance. He has performed as a comedy team, The Brothers Marquez, with his brother John Marquez, who also portrayed his fictional brother in a "Doc Martin" episode. He has played the lead role of Dad in Billy Elliot the Musical at the Victoria Palace Theatre in London's West End since November 2010.

In October 2013, he went on to play the role of Captain Dana Holmes in From Here to Eternity the Musical.

== Filmography ==
=== Film ===
Year	Film	Role	Notes
1999	Plastic Man	Steve Persey	TV film
2000	Dirty Tricks	Garcia	TV film
2001	Down	Policeman #2	
2005	The Business	Pepe	
2006	Stan	Hal Roach	TV film
2011	Holy Flying Circus	Richard Klein	TV film
2012	Les Misérables	Ensemble	
2013	Girl on a Bicycle	Clive	
2015	A Louder Silence	Martin	
2017	The Mercy	Franchessi	
2019	After Louise	Ken	
2020	7 Hours on Earth	Mr. Merriweather	

=== Television ===
Year	Title	Role	Notes
1991–1996	The Bill	D.S. Danny Pearce	Series regular
1992	Desmond's	Policeman	Episode: "Too Young"
1992	In Suspicious Circumstances		Episode: "An Uncommon Murder"
1999	Murder Most Horrid	Tony La Paglia	Episode: "Whoopi Stone"
1999	Plastic Man	Steve Persey	2 episodes
2001	Bedtime	Sam	2 episodes
2002	EastEnders	Neil	4 episodes
2002	Heartbeat	Joe Kidd	S11E12: "Closing the Book"
2005	Empire	General Crito	Mini-series
2005	Elizabeth I	Don Bernadino de Mendoza	Mini-series
2006	The Catherine Tate Show	Taxi Driver	Episode: "1951–2006"
2006–2009	Hotel Babylon	Gino Primirola	Series regular
2007	Waking the Dead	Harris Wall	Episode: "Mask of Sanity"
2007	Children in Need	Gino Primirola	Hotel Babylon sketch
2007	Lead Balloon	Tony	Episode: "Hero"
2008	Heartbeat	Rafael	Episode: "Danse Macabre"
2009	Doc Martin	Brother of Joe Penhale	Episode: "Perish Together as Fools"
2010	New Tricks	Danny Johnson	Episode: "Where There's Smoke"
2012	Twenty Twelve	Kevin Thingle	Episode: "Loose Things"
2012	Falcón	Doctor	Episode: "The Blind Man of Seville"
2013–2015	The Job Lot	Paul Franks	Series regular
2015	Benidorm	Juan	Episode: "Walking on Broken Glass"
2015	Vera	Michael Tennant	Episode: "Old Wounds"
2015	SunTrap	Mr. De Luca	Episode: "Casino"
2015	The Javone Prince Show	Policeman	1 episode
2017	Bounty Hunters	The Supplier	1 episode
2017	Modus	Hunter Russell	4 episodes
2017	The Crown	Royal Detective	Episode: "Paterfamilias"
2018	Holby City	Saul Vernon	Episode: "Hold My Hand"
2019	Dead Pixels	Barry	Episode: "Patricide"
2024	Heartstopper	Ant Spring	Episode: "Winter"

== Personal life ==
He has three sons and two daughters, including Ramona Marquez, who is known for playing Karen Brockman in Outnumbered.
