= Susi Earnshaw Theatre School =

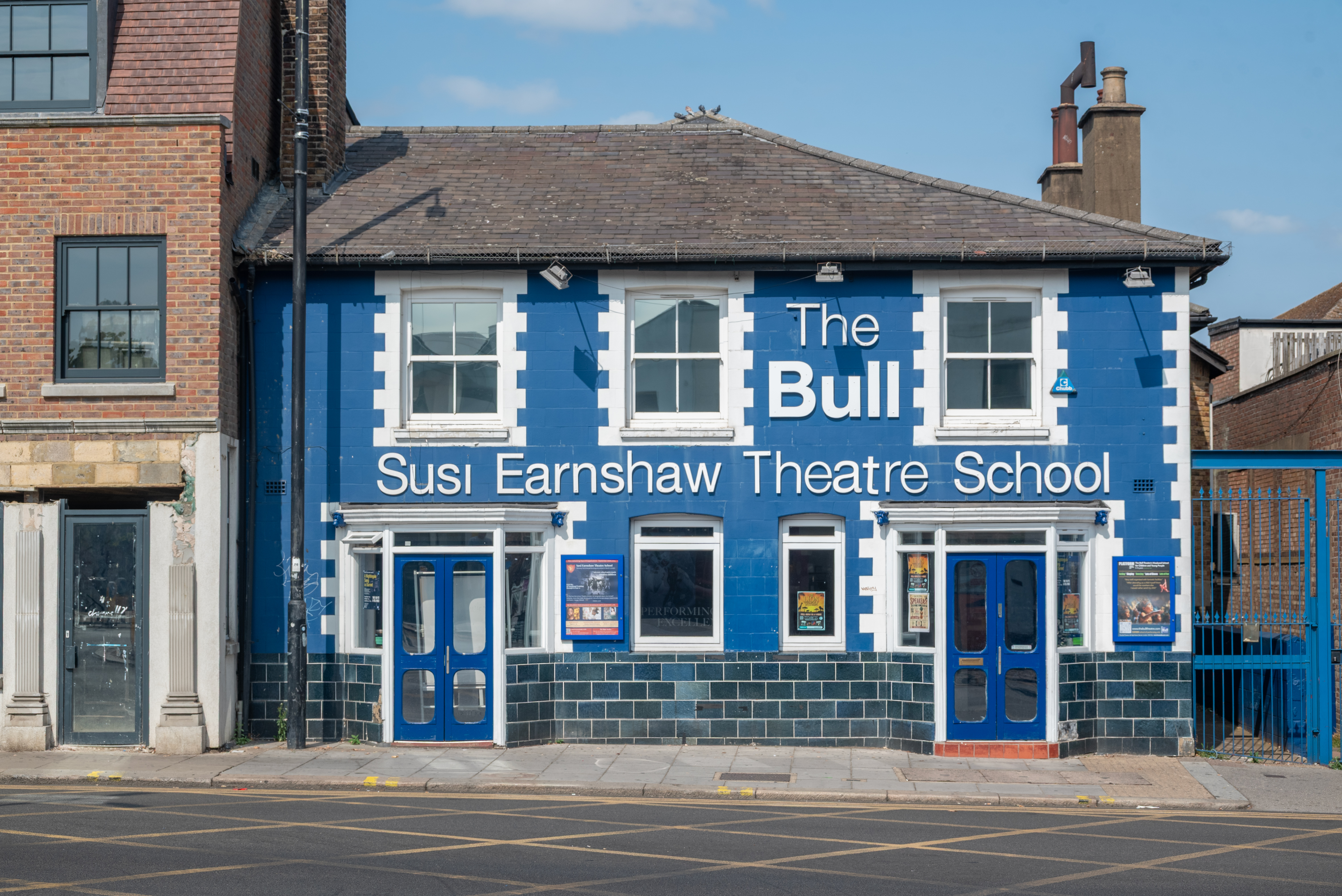

Location
- 68 High Street; Barnet, London, EN5 5SJ; England; 51.65324°N 0.19998°W

Information
- Type: other independent school
- Established: 1989
- Local authority: Barnet
- Department for Education URN: 131830 Tables
- Principal: David Earnshaw
- Gender: Coeducational
- Age: 11 to 16
- Website: http://www.susiearnshaw.co.uk

The Susi Earnshaw Theatre School is a full-time private school specialising in academics and performing arts in Barnet, North London. The school was established in 1989 by former actress and journalist Susi Earnshaw and her husband David Earnshaw, who was a producer, touring and session musician.

The school was founded in 1989 as a part-time performing-arts school, before becoming a full-time academic and performing arts secondary educational establishment. The Bull Theatre in Barnet is now home to the full-time school and its Saturday School, along with the long established Susi Earnshaw Management television, film, theatre, and live entertainment agency. Pupils gain entry to the full-time school through auditions in drama, dance, singing, and a personal interview.

== Notable alumni ==
Famous past pupils of the school include six-time Grammy Award winner Amy Winehouse; musical theatre star Alexia Khadime, who played the role of Nala in the West End production of Lion King, and in 2008, the first black female to play the role of Elphaba in the West End show Wicked; Amie Atkinson, voted BBC Radio Musical Theatre Voice of The Year 2007; Jay Asforis of Simon Fuller group S Club 8; R&B star Keisha White; and Daniel Roche, who starred in the BBC1 sitcom Outnumbered.

Other current pupils include Jack Hamshere' who is starring in the West End production of Oliver!, and Tyler McLean, who is starring in Michael Jackson's Thriller Live.
