= Robin Mukherjee (writer) =

British screenwriter, author and educator

- Occupations: screenwriter author educator
- Years active: 1990–present
- Known for: Grushko, Plastic Man, Lore

Robin Mukherjee is a British screenwriter, author, and teacher. He has written for a number of high-profile television series, including The Bill, Casualty, EastEnders and Roman Mysteries. He has also written two feature films, one of which Lore, was critically acclaimed worldwide and won many international awards, including the Australian Writer's Guild Award for Best Adapted Screenplay. It was Australia's official entry for Best Foreign Language Film at the 2012 Oscars.

In 1996, he wrote a pilot episode for a new series of Poldark, The Stranger from the Sea, which became a controversial adaptation with fans, using a new cast featuring John Bowe as Ross Poldark and Mel Martin as Demelza. Fans protested, and over fifty members of the Poldark Appreciation Society picketed HTV's headquarters in Bristol wearing 18th century costumes. He was also set to write a three-part serial for the unproduced 27th season of the Classic era of Doctor Who, entitled Alixion, but the series was put on hiatus in 1989 before his scripts reached production.

In addition, Mukherjee has authored several radio dramas and written a screenwriting manual, The Art of Screenplays: A Writer's Guide in 2014, as part of the Creative Essentials series of books on filmmaking. He serves as Bath Spa University's Writer in Residence, as well as an MA Tutor & PhD Supervisor.

== Filmography ==
Production	Notes	Broadcaster/Distributor
Casualty (1990–2007)	Salvation; Remembrance; Dangerous Games; Living in Hope; Making Waves; Dividing Loyalties; Family Matters; Private Lives; Bad Company; Waste of Space; Day One; Close Encounters	BBC One
The Bill (1990–1991)	Once A Copper; Plato For Policemen; Testimony; Furthers; Closing The Net; Stress Rules; A Question of Confidence	ITV
Boon (1991)	Bad Pennies	ITV
Grushko (1994)		BBC One
Medics (1994–1995)	Changing Faces; Lifeline; Cross Purposes	ITV
Harry (1995)	Scorpio; Backlash	BBC One
Poldark (1996)	Television film.	ITV
Dance of the Wind (1997)	co-written with and directed by Rajan Khosa.	Artificial Eye
Backup (1997)	Not Cricket; Presence	BBC One
The Broker's Man (1998)	Horses For Courses.	BBC One
Plastic Man (1999)		ITV
Where The Heart Is (2002)	Relative Strangers.	ITV
Eastenders (2002–2005)	Various Episodes	BBC One
The Royal (2005)	Duty Bound	ITV
Roman Mysteries (2008)	The Trials of Flavia Gemina; The Colossus of Rhodes	CBBC
Combat Kids (2010)		CBBC
Lore (2012)	co-written with and directed by Cate Shortland.	Artificial Eye
Hetty Feather (2016–2020)	The Letters; Cannon Fodder; Trouble; The Proposal; The Final Chapter: Part One	CBBC
Judge Dee's Mystery (2024)	1 episode	Youku/Netflix

== Bibliography ==
- The Art of Screenplays: A Writer's Guide (2014)
- Hillstation (2016)
