= John Chapman (producer) =

British television producer

John Chapman is a British television producer. He won British Academy Television Awards for Best Single Drama for Screen Two: Skallagrigg in 1995, Best Drama Series for The Street in 2008, and Best Mini Series for National Treasure in 2017. He also won a Primetime Emmy Award for Outstanding Miniseries for The Lost Prince in 2005 and a British Academy Children's Award for Best Drama for Just William in 2011.
