= The Job Lot =

British television series

- Genre: Comedy
- Created by: Claire Downes; Stuart Lane; Ian Jarvis
- Directed by: Martin Dennis (2013); Luke Snellin (2014); Sasha Ransome (2015)
- Starring: Jo Enright; Sarah Hadland; Russell Tovey; Angela Curran; Martin Marquez; Tony Maudsley; Sophie McShera; Tamla Kari; Adeel Akhtar; Laura Aikman; Nick Mohammed
- Opening theme: "Bring Me Sunshine" by Willie Nelson
- Country of origin: United Kingdom
- Original language: English
- No. of series: 3
- No. of episodes: 18

Production
- Executive producers: Kenton Allen; Matthew Justice
- Producers: Hannah Pescod, Jim Poyser
- Production location: Bethnal Green-London
- Camera setup: Single-camera
- Running time: 30 minutes (inc. adverts)
- Production company: Big Talk Productions

Original release
- Network: ITV (2013); ITV2 (2014–2015)
- Release: 29 April 2013 – 10 November 2015

The Job Lot is a British sitcom. The series is set in a busy West Midlands Job Centre, and focuses on the relationships between the staff and the jobseekers.

The series was commissioned following a successful pilot, written by Claire Downes, Stuart Lane and Ian Jarvis. It premiered on 29 April 2013 on ITV. It was later moved to ITV2 for its second series.

The show returned for a third and final series on ITV2 in October 2015.

== Cast ==
Character	Portrayed by	First appearance	Duration	Total episodes
Angela Bromford	Jo Enright	29 April 2013	2013–2015	18
Trish Collingwood	Sarah Hadland	29 April 2013	2013–2015	18
Karl Lyndhurst	Russell Tovey	29 April 2013	2013–2015	18
Janette Hodgkins	Angela Curran	29 April 2013	2013–2015	18
Paul Franks	Martin Marquez	29 April 2013	2013–2015	18
Graham Pleck	Tony Maudsley	29 April 2013	2013–2014	12
Bryony West	Sophie McShera	29 April 2013	2013–2015	10
Danielle Fisher	Tamla Kari	29 April 2013	2013	6
George Dhot	Adeel Akhtar	6 May 2013	2013–2014	11
Natalie Mason	Laura Aikman	24 September 2014	2014–2015	12
Ash	Nick Mohammed	13 October 2015	2015	5

Extras and Recurring cast

- Malkit Bharj (Series 1–2)
- Amelia Parillon (Series 1–2)
- Mark Bagnall (Series 1)
- Nigel Boyle (Series 1–2)
- Dylan Edwards (Series 2)
- Debbie J. Nash (Series 2–3)

Guest stars

- Emma Rigby (series 1)
- Sean Pertwee (series 1)
- Susannah Fielding (series 1)
- Zahra Ahmadi (series 1)
- Eileen Davies (series 1)
- Ashley McGuire (series 1)
- Keith Duffy (series 2)
- Meera Syal (series 2)
- Mark Benton (series 2)
- Rosie Cavaliero (series 2)
- John Thomson (series 3)
- Will Mellor (series 3)
- Sophie Stanton (series 3)
- Maureen Lipman (series 3)
- Christian Vit (series 3)

== Locations ==
Despite being set in Birmingham, the series was filmed mainly in East London. The building used as the exterior and interior of the job centre is the former LEB building situated at 255–279 Cambridge Heath Road, Bethnal Green (the name Brownall House can still be seen on the exterior). The back of the building and roof are part of Three Mills Film Studios in Bow.

== Series overview ==
Series	Episodes	Originally released			DVD release date (Region 2)
Series	Episodes	First released	Last released	Network	DVD release date (Region 2)
1	6	29 April 2013	10 June 2013	ITV	17 June 2013
2	6	24 September 2014	29 October 2014	ITV2	N/A
3	6	6 October 2015	10 November 2015	ITV2	N/A

== Episodes ==
=== Series 1 (2013) ===
No. overall	No. in series	Title	Directed by	Written by	Original release date
1	1	"Under Pressure"	Richard Laxton	Claire Downes, Stuart Lane & Ian Jarvis	29 April 2013
Manager Trish is struggling to keep things running smoothly. She has a world-of-work seminar to run, the temp is late, and difficult employee Angela returns, fresh from winning a tribunal. Karl is the only member of staff Trish can rely on, but now even he has reached the end of his tether.
2	2	"Army"	Martin Dennis	Claire Downes, Stuart Lane & Ian Jarvis	6 May 2013
Manager Trish invites an army sergeant to the job centre to hold an armed forces recruitment day, and the soldier soon finds himself the object of intense scrutiny. Elsewhere, benefit fraud investigator George goes undercover to catch a man who is signing on while working as a decorator. First appearance of: Adeel Akhtar as George
3	3	"Busy"	Martin Dennis	Claire Downes, Stuart Lane & Ian Jarvis	13 May 2013
When a factory suddenly shuts down, Brownall is inundated with newly unemployed jobseekers, but Karl is in the worst possible state to cope with such a busy period. Manager Trish offers to lend a hand, but she does not have a clue how to sign people on and her struggles with the computer reveal a shocking secret. This episode features a cameo from series creator Stuart Lane.
4	4	"Report"	Martin Dennis	Claire Downes, Stuart Lane & Ian Jarvis	20 May 2013
Brownall is due to be inspected and Trish is on the lookout for the person who is going to file a report, while security guard Janette is determined to beat the Great Barr branch in the league table. Elsewhere, Karl and George team up to interrogate a pair of big-time benefit cheats.
5	5	"Decisions, Decisions"	Martin Dennis	Claire Downes, Stuart Lane & Ian Jarvis	3 June 2013
Karl discovers his new girlfriend is signing on at the job centre, and knowing that this violates his employer's rules, he has a big decision to make. Meanwhile, Trish faces the task of conducting the staff appraisals, Danielle feels the pressure, and Angela is in an unusually good mood - but George suspects she is keeping something from him.
6	6	"Birthday"	Martin Dennis	Claire Downes, Stuart Lane & Ian Jarvis	10 June 2013
While celebrating her birthday, Trish receives a life-changing surprise, or so she thinks, and decides to promote Karl to the post of acting manager while she tries to get her head round what it means. However, he is soon out of his depth and the pressure mounts when a jobseeker stages a protest. Meanwhile, Danielle sits back and lets everyone else do the work, and Paul makes a bid to further his carpet-fitting business. Final appearance of: Tamla Kari as Danielle

=== Series 2 (2014) ===
The Job Lot was renewed for a second series and was filmed in January and February 2014. The series again consists of six episodes and began transmission on ITV2 from 24 September 2014 at 10pm. The new episodes were repeated on ITV each Friday at 10:40pm.

No. overall	No. in series	Title	Directed by	Written by	Original release date
7	1	"Natalie"	Luke Snellin	Claire Downes, Stuart Lane & Ian Jarvis	24 September 2014
Following the party to celebrate Trish's divorce Karl is shocked to find himself waking up naked in her bed. On arriving at work, he meets the new deputy manager Natalie Mason, whom Trish rates but about whom Angela is typically cynical. However, thanks to Natalie the whole office gets to know about his one-night stand with Trish and, feeling embarrassed, he applies for a new job. Of course, he fails but finds the means to get himself back with the job lot when he discovers Trish having sex with his flatmate Tom. First appearance of: Laura Aikman as Natalie Mason. Absent: Sophie McShera as Bryony
8	2	"First Impressions"	Luke Snellin	Claire Downes, Stuart Lane & Ian Jarvis	1 October 2014
Trish aims to impress businesswoman Jamina McNulty, who is looking for a team leader to sell her hot tubs in China. Meanwhile Karl is annoyed when hunky phone engineer Andy flirts with Natalie, so he tells Andy that she is his girlfriend. All the applicants are unsuccessful due to their inability to speak Mandarin, though surprisingly Andy does speak the language and gets the job. However, Jamina's sexist treatment of him in the hot tub leads Trish to cancel the deal.
9	3	"MP"	Luke Snellin	Claire Downes, Stuart Lane & Ian Jarvis	8 October 2014
Aware that the local MP backs job opportunities for young people, Natalie invites him to an unemployment initiative day when each staff member mentors a young joseeker. Sadly, most of the clients are quite disinterested except Ann-Marie, who fancies Karl and compromises him into going on a date with her, whilst Angela contrives an accident to get rid of the stroppy Bryony. George, the fraud investigator, gives a seminar explaining how he works, but this leads to Karl accidentally tasering Trish and when the MP arrives, she looks so dishevelled that he mistakes her for a jobseeker.
10	4	"Back to Work"	Luke Snellin	Claire Downes, Stuart Lane & Ian Jarvis	15 October 2014
The staff are encouraged to get more people back in work and Natalie challenges Angela to hit the best target, with the lazy Angela meeting her match as Trisha helps Natalie to win. Trisha also tries to set Natalie up on a date with Karl, but he misses it as he is on surveillance with George, wrongly staking out a genuinely disabled person. Next day Natalie throws herself at Karl whilst Tom, having rejected Trisha when he found she was older than she claimed, stages a demonstration to show he still loves her.
11	5	"Heroes"	Luke Snellin	Claire Downes, Stuart Lane & Ian Jarvis	22 October 2014
Security guards Janette and Paul make unlikely heroes when Trish loses her mobile phone, and Natalie gets into big trouble with a jobseeker.
12	6	"Workshop"	Luke Snellin	Claire Downes, Stuart Lane & Ian Jarvis	29 October 2014
The staff attend a mandatory Saturday morning workshop on health and wellbeing with employees from the Kingstanding branch. In the exercises Karl is hoping to be paired with Natalie but ends up with irresponsible Tyler, who gets him high, whilst Natalie is teamed with Trish's opposite number Denise, who is keen to poach her. Trish overhears Denise asking Natalie to be her deputy but gets locked in her office. Natalie accepts the offer because she is fond of Karl and the rules state that colleagues cannot date. However, Trish escapes in time to change the rules and keep Natalie and Karl together. Final appearances of: Adeel Akhtar as George and Tony Maudsley as Graham

=== Series 3 (2015) ===
A third and final series was filmed in May and June 2015, and broadcast on ITV2 between 6 October and 10 November 2015 at 10:30pm (with the exception of the final episode which was broadcast at 10pm). The episodes were repeated on ITV on Monday nights (times varied). The series again consisted of six episodes.

No. overall	No. in series	Title	Directed by	Written by	Original release date
13	1	"Pregnant"	Sasha Ransome	Claire Downes, Ian Jarvis & Stuart Lane	6 October 2015
There is confusion and babies all round at Brownall Job Centre, as Karl thinks Natalie is pregnant; Trish thinks she is beginning the menopause; Bryony is taking care of her baby uncle Martin; and Angela brings her beloved cat, Muff, to work to give birth.
14	2	"Flatmate"	Sasha Ransome	Claire Downes, Ian Jarvis, Stuart Lane & Rachael New	13 October 2015
Trish's broodiness continues to cause havoc in the workplace. Meanwhile, Karl's flatmate leaves unexpectedly, leaving him on the search for a replacement. Janette suggests Natalie, but does she really want to move in? First appearance of: Nick Mohammed as Ash
15	3	"Caravan"	Sasha Ransome	Tom Parry	20 October 2015
Trish is disconcerted to see a caravan parked in the job centre car park and is shocked to discover who is living in there. Kevin, an aspiring country and western singer comes into the job centre and is not happy when Karl stops his benefits. The fallout results in a roof top siege.
16	4	"Strike"	Sasha Ransome	Claire Downes, Ian Jarvis & Stuart Lane	27 October 2015
In her role as fire warden, Angela calls a fire drill and Natalie uses the opportunity to whisk Karl into Trish's office for a quickie. Karl calls a strike, which draws the attention of the local press.
17	5	"Tour"	Sasha Ransome	Claire Downes, Ian Jarvis & Stuart Lane	3 November 2015
Brownall tops the leaderboard for getting people off benefits at the monthly managers' meeting. Trish is more interested in Greg, a manager from the nearby Nechells Job Centre branch. Angela and Natalie go on tour attending a work conference in London with Angela giving a talk to fellow colleagues.
18	6	"Secret"	Sasha Ransome	Claire Downes, Ian Jarvis & Stuart Lane	10 November 2015
Trish is fresh back from a Spanish holiday to celebrate the job centre's 25th anniversary and brings back more than a stick of rock. Natalie seeks out the original manageress Maggie Higgins and asks her to join the staff for a celebration. Maggie remembers Angela from the 1990s but Angela is keen to distance herself...is Angela hiding something?
