= Sophie Stanton =

British actress (born 1971)

- Born: 1971 (age 54–55); London, England
- Occupation: Actress
- Years active: 1993–present
- Notable work: See below
- Television: Prime Suspect (1995); EastEnders (2001–03, 2009–10, 2012, 2015)

Sophie Stanton (born 1971) is an English actress. She is best known for her role as DCI Jill Marsden in the BBC soap opera EastEnders in which she has appeared on from 2001 to 2015.

== Career ==
=== EastEnders ===
Born in London and raised in Suffolk from the age of three, first in Onehouse and then in Stowmarket from age nine Marsden first appeared on 5 March 2001, appearing for the storyline labelled 'Who Shot Phil?'. She left on 27 March 2001 In 2002, she appeared in January, April and then from 14 November to 6 December. Again, in 2003 Marsden made numerous returns, in March, July, August, November and for a longer stint in December.

In November 2009, it was reported that Stanton would be reprising her role as Jill. Marsden returned to investigate the murder of Archie Mitchell (Larry Lamb). Speaking of her return, she said: 'It came completely out of the blue, and knocked me for six.' Continuing, she said, 'I really thought Marsden was no more. It was a really great surprise because I’d just finished a year’s run at the National Theatre, appearing in a new play called England People Very Nice – so it couldn’t have come at a better time.' She made her return on 28 December 2009. Marsden left on 22 February 2010. Marsden returned on 5 January 2012 and appeared until May 2012, with two further appearances in August 2012. It was reported again in July 2015 that Stanton would be reprising her role as Marsden for the Who Killed Lucy Beale? storyline. She also appeared in 1993 as a reporter trying to get pictures of Pat Butcher after she knocked down and killed a pedestrian while drink driving in her taxi cab

=== Other work ===
On television, Stanton has acted in Dressing for Breakfast (playing the character of Rose), The Wilsons (in which she played Dilly), Prime Suspect, Dangerous Lady, Wall of Silence, Gimme Gimme Gimme, Plastic Man, The Vice, Black Books, The Sculptress, Coupling, Midsomer Murders, The Mayor of Casterbridge, Fingersmith, Jekyll, Ashes to Ashes, Lewis, Silent Witness, Wallander, Outnumbered, My Mad Fat Diary , A Touch of Frost, and The Smoke. She also made cameo appearances as the nan of regular character Bryony in ITV2 sitcom The Job Lot and as Lyndsey in Brexit: The Uncivil War (Channel 4), and later appeared in King Gary.

Stanton's extensive theatre work includes Slaughter City (RSC), Love's Labour's Lost and Hindle Wakes (Manchester Royal Exchange), A Collier's Friday Night (Hampstead Theatre), Beautiful Thing (Bush/Donmar Warehouse), Top Girls (BAC), She Stoops To Conquer (Margate), Sleeping Around (Donmar Warehouse), Mercury Fur (Menier Chocolate Factory), Breezeblock Park (Liverpool Playhouse), Market Boy and England People Very Nice (National Theatre), The Knot of the Heart, Dying For It and Cloud Nine (Almeida), Ding Dong The Wicked (Royal Court), Nut (The Shed/National Theatre), John Falstaff in "Henry IV" (St. Ann's Warehouse, New York), Caliban in "The Tempest" (Donmar Warehouse/St. Ann's Warehouse, New York), Joyce Hopkirk in Ink (Almeida/Duke of York's), Jaques in As You Like It and Gremia in The Taming of the Shrew" (RSC).

For playing the title role in The Fantastic Follies of Mrs Rich (RSC), Stanton received exceptional notices: "Sophie Stanton is a joy as Mrs Rich" (Michael Billington, The Guardian); "Stanton-a forthright comic joy throughout" (Dominic Cavendish, The Telegraph).

Stanton both wrote and performed in the theatre play Cariad (Tristan Bates Theatre and Theatre Clwyd), and later directed Winged (Tristan Bates Theatre). Stanton also contributed the voice-over for Robbed, Raided, Reunited (BBC). She also created the role of Leah in Beautiful Thing and Beryl in Made in Dagenham: The Musical.

Stanton's film credits include Girls Night, Closer, Beautiful Thing (as Louise, Sandra's best friend), Grow Your Own, Shadowlands, Cheerful Weather for the Wedding (2012, in which she played the character Milman) and How I Live Now (2013).

Stanton's home county is Suffolk. In 1991, she graduated from the Royal Academy of Dramatic Art where she won the Gold Medal.
