= Plastic Man (TV series) =

- Genre: Medical drama
- Created by: Robin Mukherjee
- Written by: Robin Mukherjee
- Directed by: Sarah Pia Anderson
- Starring: John Thaw; Sorcha Cusack; Frances Barber; Stuart Piper; Phillipa Peak; Eddie Marsan; Shaun Parkes; Sophie Stanton; Martin Marquez; Amanda Orton; Melissa Wilson; David Nicolson
- Composer: Michael Gibbs
- Country of origin: United Kingdom
- Original language: English
- No. of series: 1
- No. of episodes: 2

Production
- Executive producer: Sally Head
- Producer: Paul Marcus
- Cinematography: Nic Morris
- Editor: Chris Wimble
- Running time: 98 minutes. (w/ advertisements)
- Production company: Sally Head Productions

Original release
- Network: ITV
- Release: 12 May – 19 May 1999

Plastic Man is a British television medical drama mini-series written and created by Robin Mukherjee. It was first broadcast on ITV and aired between 12 and 19 May 1999, the show starring John Thaw as surgeon Joe McConnell, alongside Sorcha Cusack (Erin McConnell), Frances Barber (Louise Ferman), and Eddie Marsan (Liam Cooper). The two-part series, directed by Sarah Pia Anderson, focuses on the consequences of an extramarital affair.

The series co-starred Stuart Piper, Phillipa Peak, Shaun Parkes, Sophie Stanton and Martin Marquez.

== Plot ==
A seemingly happily married, successful plastic surgeon embarks on a torrid affair with tragic consequences for his marriage and those close to him.

== Cast ==
- John Thaw as Joe McConnell
- Sorcha Cusack as Erin McConnell
- Frances Barber as Louise Ferman
- Stuart Piper as James McConnell
- Phillipa Peak as Anna McConnell
- Eddie Marsan as Liam Cooper
- Shaun Parkes as Adam Okoye
- Sophie Stanton as Claire Persey
- Martin Marquez as Steve Persey
- Amanda Orton as Ward Sister Julia
- Melissa Wilson as Jesse Finch
- David Nicolson as Mark McConnell

== Episodes ==
No.	Title	Directed by	Written by	Original release date	UK viewers (millions)
1	"Episode 1"	Sarah Pia Anderson	Robin Mukherjee	12 May 1999	8.63m
Joe McConnell is a dedicated, highly respected consultant specialising in plastic surgery. It would seem he leads a happy, fulfilling life, until the moment he succumbs to a momentary impulse. Little does he realise that he is about to betray the beliefs that have shaped his life over the past 30 years.
2	"Episode 2"	Sarah Pia Anderson	Robin Mukherjee	19 May 1999	7.49m
The repercussions of his infidelity seem enormous to Joe, but he has no idea of the enormity of the tragedy here, and those close to him, are about to face.

== Home media ==
The complete series was released on DVD by Network Distributing on 1 June 2009.
