= Grushko (TV series) =

- Genre: Crime drama
- Created by: Philip Kerr
- Based on: Dead Meat
- Written by: Robin Mukherjee
- Directed by: Tony Smith
- Starring: Brian Cox; Stephen McGann; Cathy White; Donald Sumpter; Eve Matheson; Amanda Mealing; Richard Hawley; Jack Klaff
- Composer: Tony Britten
- Country of origin: United Kingdom
- Original language: English
- No. of series: 1
- No. of episodes: 3

Production
- Executive producer: Mark Forstater
- Producer: Nicky Lund
- Production locations: Moscow, Russia
- Cinematography: Ernest Vincze
- Running time: 50 minutes
- Production company: BBC

Original release
- Network: BBC1
- Release: 24 March – 7 April 1994

Grushko is a British television three-part drama series, first broadcast on BBC1 on 24 March 1994. Based on the best-selling novel Dead Meat by Philip Kerr, the series stars Brian Cox as Colonel Yevgeni Grushko, the tough-minded Head of the Mafia Investigation Division of the St. Petersburg Police, as he investigates the murder of a TV journalist which threatens to spark gang warfare.

With Stephen McGann, Donald Sumpter, Andy Serkis, and Amanda Mealing amongst the main cast, the series was scripted by Kerr alongside screenwriter Robin Mukherjee. It was panned upon release, particularly by The Independent, in particular for its lack of authenticity and certain passages of inaudible dialogue. The title sequence was designed by Bob Cosford, who uses a typographic logo to evoke the implied menace of the Russian trucks in the opening scene.

Production archives confirm the series was first commissioned in August 1991, initially in four parts. It was later suggested that instead of individual episodes, the production could air as a one-off drama; it was eventually decided that Grushko would be a three-part series. Philip Kerr had been in the process of writing a second series when the first went to air; however, due to poor ratings, the BBC decided not to pursue a second run.

A tie-in novel with images from the series was issued by Arrow Books in 1994. The series has to date not been released on any form of home media.

== Cast ==
- Brian Cox as Colonel Yevgeni Grushko
- Stephen McGann as Lieutenant Andrei
- Cathy White as Lieutenant Sasha
- Donald Sumpter as Lieutenant General Kartashov
- Eve Matheson as Nina Grushko
- Amanda Mealing as Tanya Grushko
- Richard Hawley as Dzhumber
- Jack Klaff as Milyukin
- Dave Duffy as Nikolai
- Paul Brennen as Stepan
- Alan Stocks as Oocho
- Rosaleen Linehan as Lena
- Andy Serkis as Pyotr
- Jimmy Yuill as Chazov
- Paul Freeman as Bosenko
- Kathryn Hunter as Dr. Sopova
- Petronilla Whitfield as Galina
- Harry Miller as Oleg
- Armen Nazikyan as Ilya
- Robert Llewellyn as Petrakov
- David Dixon as Nekrasov

== Episodes ==
No. overall	No. in series	Title	Directed by	Written by	Original release date
1	1	"Episode 1"	Tony Smith	Philip Kerr & Robin Muhkerjee	24 March 1994
The firebombing of a restaurant is just the start of a long day for Colonel Yevgeni Grushko and his team. The murder of a local TV journalist and a police informant, coupled with the theft of an extremely valuable statuette, is just the tip of the iceberg as all-out gang warfare threatens to erupt.
2	2	"Episode 2"	Tony Smith	Philip Kerr & Robin Muhkerjee	31 March 1994
When it transpires that Milyukin's last investigation involved exploring gang connections to the illegal dumping of nuclear waste and possible mass radiation, Grushko and his team realise the clock is ticking, and work together to try and find the missing piece of the puzzle.
3	3	"Episode 3"	Tony Smith	Philip Kerr & Robin Muhkerjee	7 April 1994
