= Richard Hawley (actor) =

British actor (born 1955)

- Born: Richard Roland Hawley; 13 August 1955 (age 71); Bradford, West Riding of Yorkshire, England
- Occupation: Actor
- Years active: 1981–2022
- Known for: Dave Matthews in Family Affairs (1998–2000, 2003–2005); Johnny Connor in Coronation Street (2015–2021)

Richard Roland Hawley (born 13 August 1955) is a British actor, best known for his work in Grushko, Prime Suspect, Family Affairs, as well as Alex, the Deputy Prime Minister in Love Actually, and Johnny Connor in Coronation Street. He has done voice work in the video game ZombiU as The Prepper, and The Witcher 3: Wild Hunt portraying the character Sigi Reuven, known better as Sigismund Dijkstra.

== Filmography ==
=== Film ===
Year	Title	Role	Notes
1988	Stormy Monday	Weegee's Manager	
1991	Forgetting		Short film
1992	Papierowe malzenstwo	Red	
1994	Captives	Sexton	
1994	A Man You Don't Meet Everyday	Jim	
1998	Get Real	English Teacher	
1999	Kid in the Corner	Chris Joyce	
2002	Cup and Lip	Gary	Short film
2003	Love Actually	Alex - Deputy Prime Minister	
2005	Richard III	William, Lord Hastings	
2005	The Cross of Joshua Home	Joshua Home	Short film
2009	Hero	Michael	Short film
2009	Stranded	Rob	Short film
2013	The Best Years	Detective Sergeant Torks	
2021	Palamós	Terry	Short film
2022	Last Man Back	Dominic O'Driscoll	Short film

=== Television ===
Year	Title	Role	Notes
1991–1995	Prime Suspect	Detective Constable Richard Haskons	
1994	Grushko	Dzhumber	3 episodes
1998–2000, 2003–2005	Family Affairs	Dave Matthews	
2015–2021	Coronation Street	Johnny Connor	

=== Video games ===
Year	Title	Role	Notes
2011	The Witcher 2: Assassins of Kings	King Ziggy, Thirteen, Carduin	English version
2011	Warhammer 40,000: Space Marine	Sidonus	
2012	ZombiU	The Prepper	
2015	The Witcher 3: Wild Hunt	Dijkstra, Caleb Menge, Francis Bedlam	English version
