= Ramona Marquez =

British actress (born 2001)

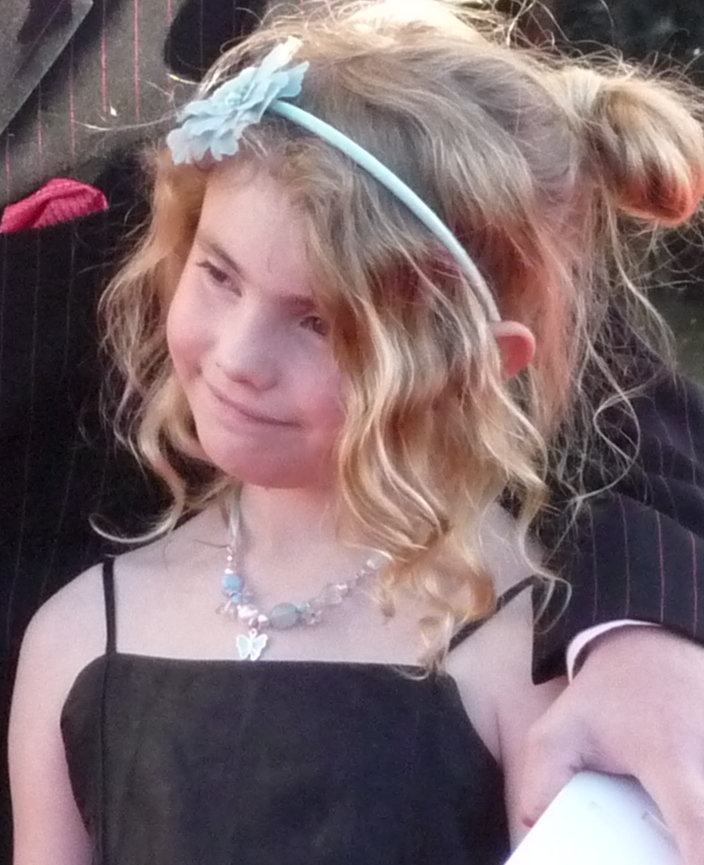
- Marquez in 2009
- Born: 24 February 2001 (age 25); London, England
- Occupations: Actress, Tattooist
- Years active: 2006–2023 (actress), 2024-present (tattoo artist)
- Television: Outnumbered
- Parent: Martin Marquez

Ramona Marquez (born 24 February 2001) is an English former child actress and tattoo artist best known for her childhood role as Karen Brockman in the BBC One sitcom Outnumbered.

== Career ==
In 2009, Marquez appeared as Imogen Pollock in the made-for-television movie Enid, detailing the life of children's writer Enid Blyton.

Later in 2009, Marquez became the first child to win the British Comedy Award for 'Best Female Comedy Newcomer'. Outnumbered also won two other comedy awards on the night, including 'Best TV Comedy'. Marquez has also appeared in The King's Speech as Princess Margaret and Arthur Christmas as the voice of Gwen.

Her father is Martin Marquez, an actor best known on television for his role as Gino Primirola, the head barman in the British television comedy drama Hotel Babylon. Her brother, Raoul Marquez, appeared with her in The Best Exotic Marigold Hotel. Her uncle John Marquez is best known for his role as Joe Penhale on the television comedy Doc Martin.

== Personal life ==
Marquez came out as bisexual in her contribution to the book Women Don't Owe You Pretty by Florence Given, published in June 2020. She has since updated her Instagram bio to read "Lesbian, vegan and a sober girly".

In 2019, it was reported that Marquez had started studying Spanish and Mandarin at the University of Manchester.

Since 2024 Marquez has moved to tattooing as a profession.

== Filmography ==
=== Film ===
Year	Title	Role	Notes	Ref(s)
2010	The King's Speech	Princess Margaret		
2011	Arthur Christmas	Gwen Hines (voice)		
2011	The Best Exotic Marigold Hotel	Madge's Grandchild		
2015	A Louder Silence	Anna		
2020	7 Hours on Earth	Charlotte		
2021	Wish You Were Gone	Carla	Short film	

=== Television ===
Year	Title	Role	Notes	Ref(s)
2007–2014, 2016, 2024	Outnumbered	Karen Brockman	Series 1–5 and Specials; 42 episodes	
2009	Enid	Imogen Pollock	Television film	
2012	Secrets and Words	Megan Williams	Episode 4: "The Crossing"	

=== Music videos ===
Year	Song	Artist	Notes	Ref(s)
2014	Kick Me	Sleeping with Sirens		

=== Awards ===
Year	Award	Category	Work	Result	Ref(s)
2009	British Comedy Award	Best Female Comedy Newcomer	Karen Brockman: Outnumbered	Won	
2012	Young Artist Award	Best Performance in a Voice-over Role, Young Actress	Gwen: Arthur Christmas	Nominated	
