= Daniel Roche =

English actor

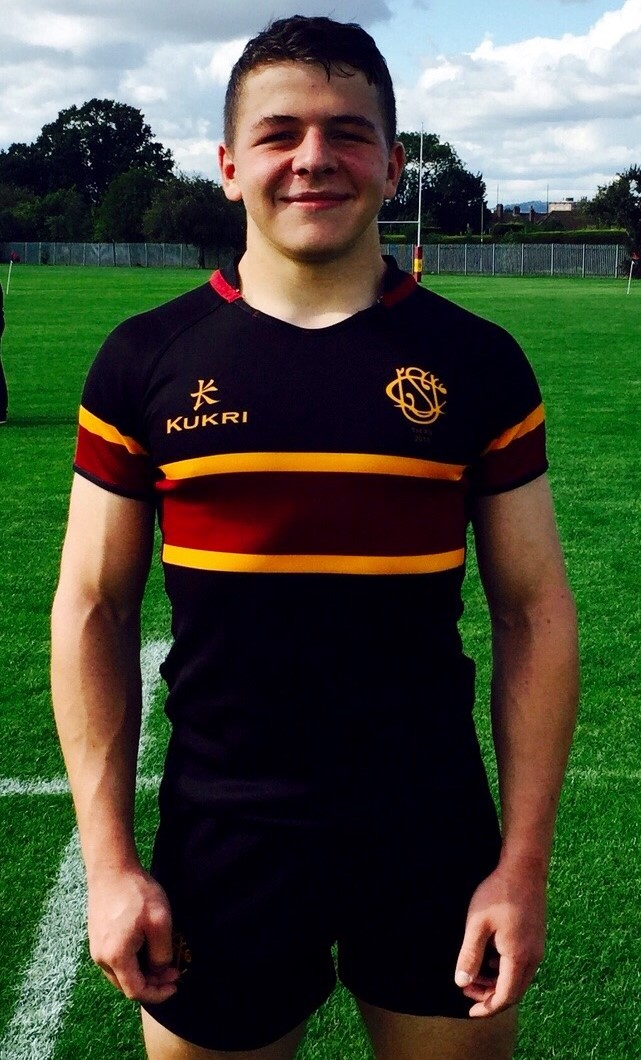
- Roche in 2015
- Born: Daniel Peter Roche; 14 October 1999 (age 26); London, England
- Education: Susi Earnshaw Theatre School; University College School
- Alma mater: King's College London
- Occupation: Actor
- Years active: 2006–present

Daniel Peter Roche (/roʊʃ/ ROHSH; born 14 October 1999) is an English actor. He is best known for playing Ben Brockman in the BBC One sitcom Outnumbered.

== Early life ==
Roche was born on 14 October 1999 to an English mother and an Irish father. He grew up in north London, attending a state CofE primary school whilst also attending the Susi Earnshaw Theatre School in Barnet for extra-curricular drama lessons. At 12, he was granted a scholarship to the independent University College School in Camden, London. In September 2018, he enrolled as an undergraduate at King's College London, where he played for the Rugby Football Club. He is a supporter of Arsenal Football Club.

== Career ==
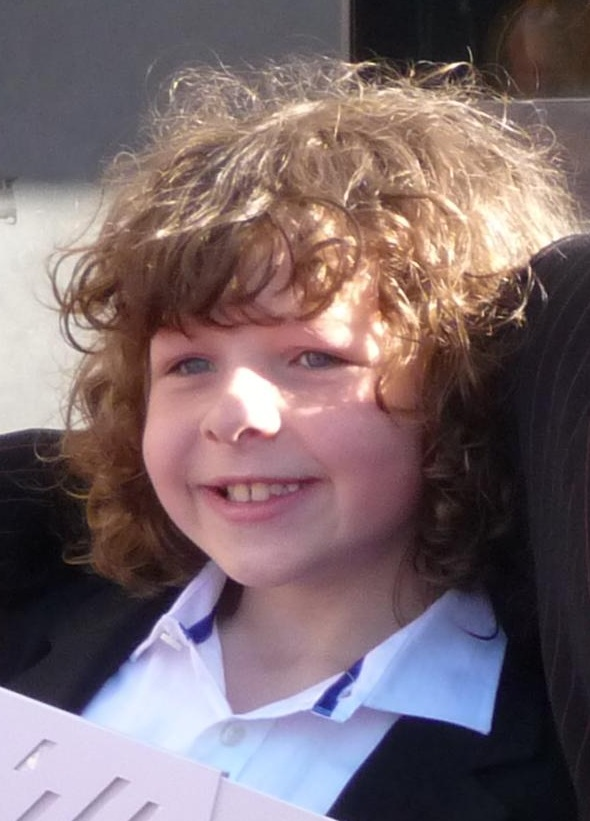
Roche at the BAFTA Awards in 2009

For his appearances in Outnumbered as Ben, he was nominated for Best Male Newcomer at the 2009 British Comedy Awards. He also appeared in the BBC One show Casualty, the film Off Season (2008), and a number of television commercials, including one for Kingsmill.

Roche played the title role in a BBC adaptation of Just William (2010), which won a children's BAFTA for best drama. He also appeared in the Sky1 comedy series Little Crackers, as a young Stephen Fry on 20 December 2010.

== Filmography ==
Year	Title	Role	Notes
2006	Casualty	Douglas Calvin	Episode: Family Matters
2007–2016; 2024	Outnumbered	Ben Brockman	Main role
2008	Off Season	Nick	Short
2010	Little Crackers	Young Stephen Fry	Main role
2010	Just William	William Brown	Main role
2011	Friday Download	Secret Santa/Himself	Christmas special
2012	The Magicians	Himself	Short
2012	Dani's House	Megaboyd	Recurring role
2012	Blue Peter	Himself	Guest
2012	Pet School	Himself	Guest
2013	Doctor Who Live: The Next Doctor	Himself	Guest

=== Awards ===
Award	Year	Result	Category	Title
British Comedy Award	2009	Nominated	Best Male Comedy Newcomer	Ben Brockman: Outnumbered
Children's BAFTA	2010	Nominated	Performer	Just William
