= Phillipa Peak =

English actress

Phillipa Peak is an English actress who appeared in ITV soap opera Emmerdale as Zoe Tate's nanny Effie Harrison in 2005 and as Ellen Dunn in EastEnders in 2007. She also appeared in an episode of Doctors on 9 January 2007, Little Miss Jocelyn and BBC1 drama, Casualty, as Chloe Waterson.

Alongside working as a television actor, Phillipa Peak has acted on stage, including her portrayal of Evelyn Ayles in Graham Farrow's stage play, Talk about the Passion, staged at the New End Theatre, London, in 2004.
