= Paul Seed =

British television director and actor (1947–2026)

- Born: 18 September 1947; Bideford, Devon, England
- Died: 7 March 2026 (aged 78)
- Occupations: Director, actor
- Notable work: House of Cards
- Spouse: Elizabeth Cassidy (m. 2000)

Paul Anthony Seed (18 September 1947 – 7 March 2026) was a British television director and actor.

== Early life and education ==
Paul Anthony Seed was born in Bideford in Devon but moved to Stockport with his family at the age of four. Attending Manchester Grammar School, he was taught English by future actor Bert Parnaby. Determined to become a vet, Seed changed his mind after becoming interested in drama from appearing in school plays. Also whilst at school, he drew cartoons and at age 16, a Danish company screened a cartoon series he created.

== Career ==
After graduating from Manchester University with a BA(Hons)in drama, Seed joined Manchester's Library Theatre Company before moving to London and working with different theatre companies including the West End. His television credits include Z-Cars, Softly, Softly: Task Force, Survivors, Doctor Who, Secret Army, Coronation Street, Crown Court and Tales of the Unexpected.

In the late 1970s, Seed chose to pursue a career in television drama directing and completed the BBC Directors' course following which he directed numerous TV plays, series and serials during the 1980s. Seed directed the BBC's smash-hit 1990 mini-series House of Cards and its sequel To Play the King, adapted by Andrew Davies from Michael Dobbs' novels.

Seed continued to direct for television drama series throughout the 1990s including A Touch of Frost and Playing the Field, and in 2002 directed all six episodes of the revival of Auf Wiedersehen, Pet.

In later years, he directed episodes of New Tricks, Northern Lights, Doc Martin and Lark Rise to Candleford, and in 2010 directed the BBC adaptation of Just William. The latter won him a BAFTA award for best drama as did a 1998 dramatisation of A Rather English Marriage for best single drama.

== Personal life and death ==
Seed lived in Torrington, Devon, and was married to actress Elizabeth Cassidy. There, he enjoyed a quieter pace of life, taking an interest in photography. He died from cancer on 7 March 2026, at the age of 78.
