= Anna Skellern =

Australian actress

- Born: 27 April 1985 (age 41); Sydney, Australia
- Education: University of Sydney; Guildhall School of Music and Drama
- Occupation: Actress
- Years active: 2002–present

Anna Skellern (born 27 April 1985) is a United Kingdom-based Australian actress, best known as the first female member of The Chaser's television programme CNNNN.

== Biography ==
Skellern attended the University of Sydney, where she was a prominent student activist. In the first season of The Chaser's CNNNN, an Australian television show satirising American news channels CNN and Fox News, she played her namesake Anna Skellern, a no-nonsense war correspondent noted for the frequent loss of her cameramen and dubbed 'the perfumed abattoir'. In 2004, CNNNN shared the Logie Award for 'Most Outstanding Comedy' with Kath & Kim.

After relocating to London, in July 2007 Skellern graduated from the Guildhall School of Music and Drama. That same month she made her professional stage debut in the successful West End production The Vegemite Tales, playing the role of Maddie.

Skellern was cast as the new Sapphire in the Big Finish Productions radio show Sapphire and Steel – beginning with "Second Sight".

Skellern was cast in the sequel to Neil Marshall's critically acclaimed horror film The Descent, The Descent Part 2, which was released in late 2009. The script sees a survivor from The Descent forced back into the system of caves she battled her way out of in the first film, in a bid to locate the rest of her group. Skellern played one of the members of the new search team that accompanies the survivor back into the caves.

In 2009, Skellern filmed Agatha Christie's Poirot: "The Clocks". She also filmed the new role of restaurant worker, babysitter, and Jake's crush, Kelly, for BBC1's award-winning, partly improvised comedy Outnumbered.

In 2010, Skellern spent time in Africa filming the lead role in the thriller Siren. She also played Jo in the British miniseries, A Passionate Woman.

She played the role of Lexy Price in series 2 of Lip Service broadcast on BBC Three in April 2012. In October 2012 Skellern played Elaine White in series 2 episode 2 of the Sky 1 comedy drama series Spy.

== Filmography ==
Year	Title	Character	Production	Notes
2002–2003	CNNNN	Anna		
2009	The Bill	Stephanie Lewis	ITV	
2009	The Descent Part 2	Cath		
2009	Agatha Christie's Poirot	Fiona Hanbury	ITV	
2010	A Passionate Woman	Jo		
2010	Outnumbered	Kelly	BBC	
2010	Half Hearted	Svetlana		
2010	Siren	Rachel		
2011	Camelot	Arwen	Starz	
2011	A Night in the Woods	Kerry Hastings		
2011	W.E.	Daphne		
2011	The Incident	Lynn		
2011	Fingers	Carrie		
2011	7lives	Felicity		
2012	Lip Service	Lexy Price	BBC Three	
2012	Parade's End	Bobbie Pelham	BBC Two	
2012	Spy	Elaine	Sky1	
2012	Gambit	Secretary Fiona		
2013	I Give It a Year	Claudia		
2013	Jo	Vanessa Serfaty	TF1	
2013	Heading Out	Sophie	BBC Two	
2013	Plebs	Irina	ITV2	Season 1, Episode 5: "Bananae"
2013	Drifters	Ellie	E4	
2014	The Musketeers	Maria Bonnaire		Episode 3: "Commodities"
2014	Blood Moon	Marie		
2015	The Interceptor	Kim		
2016	Humans	Emma		
2018	Origin	Jennifer Moore		Episode: "Bright Star"

== Personal life ==
In 2007, Skellern was at the centre of a public spat between two of her former boyfriends, singer-songwriter Tim Freedman and comedian Chris Taylor. On 7 October 2007, Freedman posted a message on the official website of his band The Whitlams, citing a parody of him that was written by Taylor, and was broadcast on the 3 October 2007 episode of The Chaser's War on Everything. The song was performed by fellow Chaser Andrew Hansen, and the lyrics implied that Freedman was obsessed with the Sydney suburb of Newtown, and that he continually referred to the area of Newtown in his own songs. In his message, Freedman alluded that the lyrics were indeed written by Taylor, and that the parody had been motivated by jealousy over Skellern.

Taylor denied this, and said that the song had nothing to do with Skellern. "He [Freedman] was speculating that the song was written out of some sort of jealous rage or payback which isn't the case at all," he said. "My relationship with Anna didn't end badly... we're still good friends and see each other quite a bit."
