= Outnumbered (British TV series) =

British TV sitcom (2007–2024)

- The title card from the first episode
- Genre: Comedy drama Sitcom
- Created by: Andy Hamilton; Guy Jenkin
- Written by: Andy Hamilton; Guy Jenkin
- Directed by: Andy Hamilton; Guy Jenkin
- Starring: Claire Skinner; Hugh Dennis; Tyger Drew-Honey; Daniel Roche; Ramona Marquez; Samantha Bond; David Ryall; Rosalind Ayres
- Composer: Philip Pope
- Country of origin: United Kingdom
- Original language: English
- No. of series: 5
- No. of episodes: 36 (+ 6 shorts) (list of episodes)

Production
- Executive producers: Jimmy Mulville; Jon Rolph
- Producers: Andy Hamilton; Guy Jenkin; Pat Lees
- Production locations: West London
- Cinematography: Martin Hawkins; Rob Kitzmann
- Editors: Mark Williams; Mark Davis; Nigel Williams; Steve Tempia; Simon Reglar; Will Claramunt
- Running time: 30 minutes 40 minutes (specials)
- Production companies: Hat Trick Productions; BBC

Original release
- Network: BBC One; BBC One HD
- Release: 28 August 2007 – 26 December 2024

Outnumbered is a British sitcom about the Brockman family, starring Hugh Dennis as the father, Claire Skinner as the mother and their three children played by Tyger Drew-Honey, Daniel Roche and Ramona Marquez.

There were five series, which aired on BBC One from 2007 to 2014. A one-off Christmas reunion special aired on 26 December 2016. The following year, Hugh Dennis expressed hope that more one-off specials would be made following the success of the 2016 Christmas special. A further Christmas special was broadcast on BBC One on 26 December 2024.

Produced by Hat Trick Productions and the British Broadcasting Corporation, Outnumbered was written, directed and produced by Andy Hamilton and Guy Jenkin, although parts of the show are semi-improvised. The adult actors learn the scripts, while the children are given last-minute instructions by the writers instead.

The programme has received critical acclaim for its semi-improvisational scripting and realistic portrayal of children and family life. Ratings have been average for its time slot, but the series has won a number of awards from the Comedy.co.uk awards, the Royal Television Society, the British Comedy Awards and the Broadcasting Press Guild. Plans for an American adaptation were announced in February 2009, but as of November 2024 this has not materialised. The original series began airing in the US on BBC America on 30 July 2011, as well as airing on PBS stations.

== Plot ==
The main characters in Outnumbered, as they appeared in series four (left-to-right): Jake (Tyger Drew-Honey), Sue (Claire Skinner), Pete (Hugh Dennis), Karen (Ramona Marquez) and Ben (Daniel Roche)

Outnumbered is centred on the Brockmans, a middle-class family living in Chiswick, west London, whose two parents are "outnumbered" by their three somewhat unruly children. The father, Pete (Hugh Dennis), is a history teacher at a dysfunctional inner-city school and the mother, Sue (Claire Skinner), is a part-time personal assistant and is four years younger than Pete.

The three children are: Jake (Tyger Drew-Honey), the straight man of the family, whose teenage sarcasm and obsession with girls worries his mother, Ben (Daniel Roche), who is hyperactive, a pathological liar, does unusual things (experimenting or, as Pete puts it, "roasting insects"), and is always coming up with hypothetical questions like "who would win in a fight between...", and Karen (Ramona Marquez), who asks too many questions, frequently imitates a lot of what she sees on television (reenacting reality shows with her toys) and criticises nearly everything.

Other regular characters include Sue's new age sister, Angela Morrison (Samantha Bond), and their elderly father Frank (David Ryall), referred to as "Granddad", who is in the early stages of dementia. He is a silent and deceased character in the 2016 special. The writers also use the popular sitcom device of the unseen character in the form of Veronica, Sue's unreasonably demanding boss in series one. In series two, the device is used again, but in the form of Sue's new boss Tyson, who is revealed to be a conman who absconds in the final episode of the series. Series three introduces Rosalind Ayres as Pete's mum Sandra, referred to as "Gran", an online-gambling addict with a growing hatred for Pete's father, from whom she has separated, though has not divorced as she "couldn't face all the paperwork".

Other new characters in series three include Kelly (Anna Skellern), a psychology student on whom Jake has a crush, Angela's new husband Brick (Douglas Hodge), who is an American therapist (later revealed to be abusive towards his children, especially 15-year-old Misty), and his daughter Taylor Jean, who wants to live with her mum. Also introduced is a campaigner against council plans to place speed bumps on the road (Alex Macqueen) who pesters the family.

By series five, the Brockman children have changed considerably. Jake has developed a penchant for engaging with a suspect crowd of friends, and a general teenage cockiness. Ben has doubled in size and strength, but not maturity. And the pre-teen Karen has become moody, sullen and developed a superiority complex as she heads towards a prestigious secondary school.

== Production ==
Claire Skinner discusses the making of the pilot
from the BBC programme Woman's Hour, 1 September 2010

Outnumbered was the first collaboration between Hamilton and Jenkin since Drop the Dead Donkey ended in 1998. It was commissioned by BBC controller Lucy Lumsden. The executive producer is Jon Rolph. The 20-minute pilot was given to Lumsden, who then commissioned six episodes. The show is set in Chiswick, West London, and shot on location in Wandsworth. The house used for external shots is in Dempster Road. During the second series, the family receive a final demand for council tax from the fictional "Limebridge Council", sent to the fictional address of 19 Keely Road, London, W4 2CF.

The writers use improvisation in order to achieve convincing performances from the child actors. Jenkin added:

You rarely get the feeling that children in sitcoms are real. They tend to be the same type of character—the smartarse who says adult things—and they are rooted to the spot, staring at the camera, because they've been told to stand in one place and say the lines. We decided to attempt to do something that hadn't been tried before, bounced some ideas around and we got very keen on this idea of involving improvisation very quickly.

The child performers were cast based on how their responses reflected the outlines of the characters they would be playing. Hamilton said in an interview: "I saw about 30 [children], then we whittled it down to the perfect three. Ramona [Marquez]...was in the same class as Guy's twin sons. His wife said to him: 'There's a girl who's got something—you should meet her.'"

The fourth series began on 2 September 2011 at 9.00 p.m. on BBC One. After the series had aired, Tyger Drew-Honey suggested that there would be no fifth series because he and the other child actors were growing out of their roles. BBC Television's Head of Communications, Sam Hodges, reassured fans of the series that "contrary to reports, talks are already under way regarding a new series".

The fifth and final series was confirmed by BBC and began to air Wednesday 29 January 2014. The series comprised six episodes.

In 2015, Tyger Drew-Honey hinted that the series could return for a Christmas special in 2016. This was officially confirmed by co-creator Andy Hamilton in September 2016.

On 23 May 2024, the BBC revealed that a Christmas special will be shown in December of that year, marking it the first episode of the series in eight years.

On 20 December 2024, Andy Hamilton revealed that he has not ruled out making episodes in the future, he said "Well, you should never say never, but I just said it twice".

== Episodes ==
Series
Series	Episodes	Originally released		Ave. UK viewers (millions)
Series	Episodes	First released	Last released	Ave. UK viewers (millions)
1	6	28 August 2007	5 September 2007	2.46
2	7	15 November 2008	27 December 2008	4.39
Special		27 December 2009		5.98
3	6	8 April 2010	20 May 2010	6.34
4	6	2 September 2011	7 October 2011	5.32
Special		24 December 2011		8.47
Special		24 December 2012		9.39
5	6	29 January 2014	5 March 2014	6.08
Special		26 December 2016		7.03
Special		26 December 2024		7.41

== Cast and characters ==
=== Main ===
- Claire Skinner as Sue Brockman (née Morrison)
- Hugh Dennis as Pete Brockman
- Tyger Drew-Honey as Jake Brockman
- Daniel Roche as Ben Brockman
- Ramona Marquez as Karen Brockman

=== Recurring ===
- Samantha Bond as Angela Morrison
- David Ryall as Frank "Grandad" Morrison
- Hattie Morahan as Jane
- Lorraine Pilkington as Barbara
- Rosalind Ayres as Sandra "Gran" Brockman
- Anna Skellern as Kelly
- Michaela Brooks as Jo
- Danni Benattar as Alexa
- David Troughton as Mr. Hunslet
- Emily Berrington as Stacey

=== Guest appearances ===
- Jacob Anderson
- Michele Austin
- Mark Benton
- Sanjeev Bhaskar
- Silas Carson
- Lolita Chakrabarti
- Louisa Connolly-Burnham
- Jake D'Arcy
- Lucinda Dryzek
- Daisy Edgar-Jones
- Rebecca Front
- Chris Geere
- Stella Gonet
- Daisy Haggard
- Mark Heap
- Julia Hills
- Douglas Hodge
- Katherine Jakeways
- Miles Jupp
- Sam Kelly
- Caroline Langrishe
- Lee Mack
- Alex Macqueen
- Ruth Madeley
- Felicity Montagu
- Cliff Parisi
- Nigel Pegram
- Lucy Porter
- Olivia Poulet
- Vineeta Rishi
- Abdul Salis
- John Sessions
- Harry Shearer
- Mark Spalding
- Sophie Stanton
- Rhashan Stone
- Ellen Thomas
- Pip Torrens
- Martin Trenaman
- Eros Vlahos
- Katy Wix
- Sarah Woodward
- Matilda Ziegler

== Ages of children ==
Series	Jake	Ben	Karen	Zara (Jake's daughter)
1	11	7	5	—N/a
2	12	8	6	—N/a
2009 Christmas special	13	9	7	—N/a
3	13	9	7	—N/a
4	15	11	9	—N/a
2011 Christmas special	15	11	9	—N/a
2012 Christmas special	16	12	10	—N/a
5	17	13	11	—N/a
2016 Boxing Day special	21	17	15	—N/a
2024 Christmas special	29	25	23	3–4

All of the children's birthdays seem to be in the summer. For example, between series 2 and 3, which is an 18-month gap narratively, going from autumn 2008 to spring 2010 (we know when each series is set due to references to political figures such as the Prime Minister and the US President), they are all only a year older. Series 4 is set 15 months after series 3, in autumn 2011, and all the children are two years older.

Jake is said to be 17 in the 2012 Christmas special and in series 5, which are set for over a year apart.

In the 2016 Boxing Day special, Ben is said to be 17 and is seen learning to drive (the legal driving age in the UK is 17) but that is a year older than Ben should be in 2016 (the same is true for Jake and Karen as well).

== Reception ==
=== Critical reception ===
The show initially received a mixed reception, though after the second series reviews gradually shifted towards a fairly positive tone. The Daily Mirror found the mundane settings to be similar to the American sitcom Seinfeld, saying:

compared to the ridiculous carry-on of My Family, it's much more low-key and realistic. In fact it's so low-key, nothing actually happens, which could well be a nod to Seinfeld—the touchstone of all great sitcoms. The getting ready for school chaos is like Supernanny: The Movie only with nicer children. It's also taken a leaf out of Curb Your Enthusiasm's book with large chunks of improvisation—although the strongest language you'll find here is "ponk".

Kevin Maher of The Times dismissed the programme, saying it was not funny or dramatic enough. He wrote:

Outnumbered was at its most meretricious. For every exchange between adult and child was hijacked by a crass sitcommy need for sotto voce punchlines and knowing winks to the wings. A protracted scene in which 45-year-old dad (Hugh Dennis) was unable to wrestle a live power drill from the hands of 7-year-old son Ben (Daniel Roche), and instead had to, ho-ho, pay him £5 for the privilege, was emblematic of the show's dubious capacity for fake pay-offs.

Rod Liddle, writing in The Sunday Times, praised the show, although he was somewhat surprised: "An exquisitely middle-class, middle-aged domestic situation comedy set in West London—and starring one of those bloody stand-up comics who now festoons every network, it really should be hated before it is even seen. Start liking this sort of programme and you are an ace away from enjoying Terry and June and having a house that smells faintly of weak tea, Murray Mints and urine. So, maybe it's just me, but Outnumbered is very funny indeed: despite its current bout of self-flagellation, the BBC still knows how to make people laugh. Comedy may be the very last thing the corporation does well."

James Walton wrote in The Daily Telegraph that the domestic setting and more mundane storylines were a virtue, saying, "All of this feels both carefully observed and suspiciously heartfelt. More unusually, it's not contrived. Outnumbered sticks firmly with the mundane, yet manages to be funny about it. It doesn't avoid the sheer dullness involved in family life either—but, happily, depicts it with a winning mixture of exasperation and affection." He did, however, criticise the scheduling of the programme saying, "Despite the very specific London setting, the series (shown in two batches of three, this week and next) will surely appeal to the parents of young children everywhere. As long, that is, as they're not asleep by 10.35pm."

In 2008 review in The Times, Bryan Appleyard described Outnumbered as "the best British sitcom in years and among the best ever".

=== Ratings ===
The first episode received 4.1 million viewers (25.5% of the audience share) when it began and finished with 2.8 million (19.5%) at the end, which is larger than the average 2.2 million (14%) normally attracted by television shows in its particular time slot. The audience for the second episode fell by half a million viewers, while still being the highest ranking show in its time slot, with 18% of the audience share. However, it maintained a constant audience throughout the first series, with the fourth episode attracting 2.7 million viewers (20% audience share).

Episode ratings from BARB.

Series 1

Episode no.	Air date	Viewers (millions)	Official share	BBC One weekly ranking
1	28 August 2007	2.72	18.8%	—N/a
2	29 August 2007	2.34	17.6%	—N/a
3	30 August 2007	2.37	15.8%	—N/a
4	3 September 2007	2.39	17.5%	—N/a
5	4 September 2007	2.58	19.2%	—N/a
6	5 September 2007	2.37	19.6%	—N/a

Series 2

Episode no.	Air date	Viewers (millions)	Official share	BBC One weekly ranking
1	15 November 2008	3.83	16.2%	—N/a
2	22 November 2008	3.63	14.6%	—N/a
3	29 November 2008	3.48	13.6%	—N/a
4	6 December 2008	4.23	17.7%	—N/a
5	13 December 2008	3.88	14.5%	—N/a
6	20 December 2008	6.87	32.0%	10
7	27 December 2008	4.86	21.4%	—N/a

Series 3

Episode no.	Air date	Viewers (millions)	Official share	Weekly rank	iPlayer viewings
1	8 April 2010	6.70	24.8%	6	908,000
2	15 April 2010	5.82	20.8%	9	786,000
3	22 April 2010	6.37	23.7%	9	652,000
4	6 May 2010	5.90	22.6%	10	832,000
5	13 May 2010	6.75	26.6%	9	687,000
6	20 May 2010	6.51	26.2%	9	641,000

Series 4

Episode no.	Air date	Viewers (millions)	Overnight share	Weekly rank	iPlayer viewings
1	2 September 2011	6.11	23.8%	9	1,039,000
2	9 September 2011	5.37	19.5%	14	806,000
3	16 September 2011	5.45	21.5%	11	686,000
4	23 September 2011	5.21	19.9%	10	622,000
5	29 September 2011	5.02	18.4%	16	—N/a
6	7 October 2011	4.78	17.2%	17	—N/a

Series 5

Episode no.	Air date	Viewers (millions)	Overnight share	Weekly rank	iPlayer viewings
1	29 January 2014	6.80	18.9%	11	1,398,000
2	5 February 2014	6.03	20.6%	12	1,885,000
3	12 February 2014	6.00	17.2%	14	1,779,000
4	19 February 2014	5.46	15.9%	12	1,659,000
5	26 February 2014	6.04	18.4%	13	—N/a
6	5 March 2014	6.16	17.8%	9	1,404,000

Specials

Air date	Viewers (millions)	Overnight share	BBC One weekly ranking	iPlayer viewings
26 December 2009	5.98	24.5%	22	—N/a
24 December 2011	8.47	28.1%	10	572,000
24 December 2012	9.39	31.4%	10	897,000
26 December 2016	6.87	23.2%	8	1,129,000

=== Awards ===
Outnumbered was nominated for the 2008 "Broadcast Award" for "Best Comedy Programme", but lost the award to The Thick of It.

The show was given the "British Comedy Guide Editors' Award" in The Comedy.co.uk Awards 2007 and the "Best Returning British TV Sitcom" in The Comedy.co.uk Awards 2008, beating Peep Show by six votes.

In 2009, it won the Royal Television Society Award for "Scripted Comedy", and two Broadcasting Press Guild Awards in the same year: "Best Comedy/Entertainment" and the "Writer's Award". Outnumbered also won three awards at the 2009 British Comedy Awards: Best Sitcom, Best British Comedy and Best Female Newcomer for Ramona Marquez.

The show has received four BAFTA TV Award nominations: Best Situation Comedy, the Audience Award, and Best Comedy Performance for Claire Skinner in 2009; and Best Male Performance in a Comedy Role for Hugh Dennis in 2010.

At the National Television Awards in 2011, Outnumbered was nominated for Best Comedy but lost out to ITV's Benidorm. It was nominated again the following year and won.

== DVD releases ==
All five series and three of the Christmas specials are available on DVD. The first Comic Relief special is available on the Series 2 DVD, the first Sport Relief special is available on the Series 3 DVD and the second Comic Relief special is available on the Series 4 DVD. It has been said that the second Sport Relief special will either be available on the next Christmas Special DVD or the Series 5 DVD (if they will be filmed or if they have been filmed). The DVDs have been published by 2 Entertain. It is currently unclear whether the 2024 Christmas special has been released or if it ever will be released on DVD as of May 2025.

DVD title	Release date		Features
DVD title	Region 2	Region 4	Features
Series One	17 November 2008	1 July 2010	1 disc; Interviews with the cast and writers
Series Two	16 November 2009	2 September 2010	2 discs; The Comic Relief special, out-takes and deleted scenes
Series One & Two	16 November 2009	No release	3 discs; Special features same as individual releases
The Christmas Special	18 January 2010	No release	1 disc; 39 minutes
Series Three	15 November 2010	11 February 2011	1 disc; The Sports Relief special and documentary
Series One, Two, Three and The Christmas Special	15 November 2010	5 April 2011	5 discs; Special features same as individual releases
Series Four	21 November 2011	1 March 2012	1 disc; Alternative scenes, deleted scenes, Comic Relief sketch
Complete Series 1–4	21 November 2011	3 May 2012	6 discs; Same as individual releases plus 2009 Christmas special
The Christmas Special 2011	9 January 2012	No release	1 disc
Series Five	10 March 2014	7 May 2014	2 discs; Bloopers, deleted scenes and the 2012 Christmas Special
The Complete Collection (Series 1–5)	10 March 2014	7 May 2014	9 discs; Special features same as individual releases plus 2009, 2011 & 2012 Christmas specials
The Complete Collection	28 June 2021	TBA	10 discs; Special features same as individual releases plus 2009, 2011, 2012 Christmas specials, and for the first time, the 2016 Christmas special
