= British Academy Television Award for Best Comedy (Programme or Series) =

Annual award

British Academy Television Award
- Country: United Kingdom
- Presented by: British Academy of Film and Television Arts
- First award: 1980 (presented in 1981)
- Currently held by: Rob & Romesh Vs (2024)
- Website: http://www.bafta.org/

The British Academy Television Award for Best Comedy Entertainment Programme or Series was first presented at the 1981 ceremony. According to British Academy of Film and Television Arts the category "includes programmes that capture the idea of comedy being central to the editorial of the programme and includes panel-led shows, chat shows where comic content plays a big part, stand-up and comedy clip shows".

Since the 2000 BAFTA TV Award ceremony there has been a separate award category for Best Situation Comedy. This category had previously been presented from 1973-1980 (when there was no Best Comedy Series award). Throughout the 1980s and 1990s 'Situation Comedies' were included in the Best Comedy Programme or Series category.

Name variations for this category:

- 1981–1992: Best Comedy Series
- 1992–2007: Best Comedy Programme or Series
- 2007–2013: Best Comedy Programme
- 2014–present: Best Comedy and Comedy Entertainment Programme

== Winners and nominees ==
=== 1960s ===
Best Comedy Series

Year	Recipient(s)	Title
1965	Joe McGrath	
1966	Michael Mills	The World Of Wooster; Comedy Playhouse: Sam The Samaritan; 90 Years On - Churchill Birthday Programme
1966	Dick Clement	The Likely Lads; Comedy Playhouse: Barnaby Spoot and the Exploding Whoopee Cushion
1966	David Croft	Hugh and I A Slight Case of... Dick Emery Show
1966	Shaun O'Riordan	The Worker; The Tigers Are Burning; Emergency Ward Ten; The Braden Beat; Front Page Story
1967	Dick Clement	
1968	Michael Mills	

=== 1980s ===
Best Comedy Series

Year	Title	Recipient(s)	Broadcaster
1981	Yes Minister	Sydney Lotterby	BBC Two
1981	Agony	John Reardon	ITV
1981	Shelley	Anthony Parker	ITV
1981	Butterflies	Sydney Lotterby, John B Hobbs	BBC Two
1981	To the Manor Born	Gareth Gwenlan	BBC One
1982	Yes Minister	Peter Whitmore	BBC Two
1982	A Fine Romance	James Cellan Jones	ITV
1982	Hi-de-Hi!	David Croft, John Kilby	BBC One
1982	To the Manor Born	Gareth Gwenlan	BBC One
1983	Yes Minister	Peter Whitmore	BBC Two
1983	Hi-de-Hi!	David Croft, John Kilby	BBC One
1983	Last of the Summer Wine	Alan J. W. Bell	BBC One
1983	A Fine Romance	James Cellan Jones	ITV
1984	Hi-de-Hi!	John Kilby	BBC One
1984	A Fine Romance	Don Leaver	ITV
1984	Last of the Summer Wine	Sydney Lotterby	BBC One
1984	Only Fools and Horses	Ray Butt	BBC One
1985	The Young Ones	Paul Jackson	BBC Two
1985	A Fine Romance	Don Leaver	ITV
1985	Hi-de-Hi!	David Croft	BBC One
1985	Just Good Friends	Ray Butt	BBC One
1986	Only Fools and Horses	Ray Butt	BBC One
1986	Last of the Summer Wine	Alan J. W. Bell	BBC One
1986	'Allo 'Allo!	David Croft	BBC One
1986	Open All Hours	Sydney Lotterby	BBC One
1987	Just Good Friends	Sue Bysh, Ray Butt	BBC One
1987	Duty Free	Vernon Lawrence	ITV
1987	Only Fools and Horses	Ray Butt	BBC One
1987	Ever Decreasing Circles	Harold Snoad	BBC One
1987	'Allo 'Allo!	David Croft	BBC One
1987	Yes, Prime Minister	Sydney Lotterby	BBC Two
1988	Blackadder the Third	Mandie Fletcher, John Lloyd	BBC One
1988	Ever Decreasing Circles	Harold Snoad	BBC One
1988	Bread	Robin Nash	BBC One
1988	'Allo 'Allo!	David Croft	BBC One
1988	Yes, Prime Minister	Sydney Lotterby	BBC Two
1989	Only Fools and Horses: "Christmas Special"	Tony Dow, Gareth Gwenlan, John Sullivan	BBC One
1989	After Henry	Simon Brett, Peter Frazer-Jones	ITV
1989	Bread	Robin Nash, Carla Lane	BBC One
1989	'Allo 'Allo!	Jeremy Lloyd, David Croft, Martin Dennis, Susan Belbin	BBC One

=== 1990s ===
Best Comedy Series

Year	Title	Recipient(s)	Broadcaster
1990	Blackadder Goes Forth	Richard Boden, Richard Curtis, Ben Elton & John Lloyd	BBC One
1990	After Henry	Simon Brett, Peter Frazer-Jones	ITV
1990	The New Statesman	Tony Charles, Geoffrey Sax, Laurence Marks, Maurice Gran	ITV
1990	Only Fools and Horses	Tony Dow, Gareth Gwenlan, John Sullivan	BBC One
1991	The New Statesman	Maurice Gran, Laurence Marks, David Reynolds & Geoffrey Sax	ITV
1991	Drop the Dead Donkey	Andy Hamilton, Guy Jenkin, Liddy Oldroyd	Channel 4
1991	May to December	Paul Mendelson, Verity Lambert, Sydney Lotterby	BBC One
1991	One Foot in the Grave	David Renwick, Susan Belbin	BBC One
1991	Only Fools and Horses	Tony Dow, Gareth Gwenlan, John Sullivan	BBC One

Best Comedy Programme or Series

Year	Title	Recipient(s)	Broadcaster
1992	One Foot in the Grave	Susan Belbin, David Renwick	BBC One
1992	The Curse of Mr. Bean	Richard Curtis, Robin Driscoll, Rowan Atkinson, John Howard Davies	ITV
1992	Drop the Dead Donkey	Guy Jenkin, Andy Harnilton, Liddy Oldroyd	Channel 4
1992	Only Fools and Horses	Tony Dow, Gareth Gwenlan, John Sullivan	BBC One
1993	Absolutely Fabulous	Jon Plowman, Jennifer Saunders, Bob Spiers	BBC Two
1993	One Foot in the Grave	Susan Belbin, David Renwick	BBC One
1993	Birds of a Feather	Terry Kinane, Laurence Marks, Maurice Gran, Candida Julian-Jones	BBC One
1993	Waiting for God	Gareth Gwenlan, Michael Aitkens	BBC One
1994	Drop the Dead Donkey	Andy Hamilton, Guy Jenkin, Liddy Oldroyd	Channel 4
1994	Rab C. Nesbitt	Colin Gilbert, Ian Pattison	BBC Two
1994	Chef!	Charlie Hanson, John Birkin, Peter Tilbury	BBC One
1994	Desmond's	Humphrey Barclay, Paulette Randall, Jan Sargent	Channel 4
1995	Three Fights, Two Weddings and a Funeral	Geoff Posner, David Tyler	BBC Two
1995	Absolutely Fabulous	Jon Plowman, Bob Spiers, Jennifer Saunders	BBC One
1995	One Foot in the Grave	Susan Belbin, David Renwick	BBC One
1995	Drop the Dead Donkey	Andy Hamilton, Guy Jenkin, Liddy Oldroyd	Channel 4
1996	Father Ted	Graham Linehan, Declan Lowney, Arthur Matthews, Geoffrey Perkins	Channel 4
1996	One Foot in the Grave	Susan Belbin, David Renwick	BBC One
1996	Absolutely Fabulous	Jon Plowman, Bob Spiers, Jennifer Saunders	BBC One
1996	Men Behaving Badly	Beryl Vertue, Martin Dennis, Simon Nye	BBC One
1997	Only Fools and Horses	Tony Dow, Gareth Gwenlan & John Sullivan	BBC One
1997	Father Ted	Lissa Evans, Graham Linehan, Declan Lowney, Arthur Matthews	Channel 4
1997	Absolutely Fabulous	Jon Plowman, Janice Thomas, Bob Spiers, Jennifer Saunders	BBC One
1997	Game On	Geoffrey Perkins, Sioned Wiliam, John Stroud, Andrew Davies, Bernadette Davis	BBC Two
1998	I'm Alan Partridge	Peter Baynham, Dominic Brigstocke, Steve Coogan, Armando Iannucci	BBC Two
1998	One Foot in the Grave	Esta Charkham, Christine Gernon, David Renwick	BBC One
1998	The Vicar of Dibley	Jon Plowman, Sue Vertue, Dewi Humphreys, Richard Curtis, Paul Mayhew-Archer	BBC One
1998	Men Behaving Badly	Beryl Vertue, Martin Dennis, Simon Nye	BBC One
1999	Father Ted	Andy DeEmmony, Lissa Evans, Graham Linehan, Arthur Matthews	Channel 4
1999	The Vicar of Dibley	Jon Plowman, Sue Vertue, Dewi Humphreys, Richard Curtis, Paul Mayhew-Archer	BBC One
1999	Dinnerladies	Geoff Posner, Victoria Wood	BBC One
1999	The Royle Family	Glenn Wilhide, Mark Mylod, Caroline Aherne, Craig Cash, Henry Normal	BBC Two

=== 2000s ===
Best Comedy Programme or Series

Year	Title	Recipient(s)	Broadcaster
2000	The League of Gentlemen		BBC Two
2000	Best of Ali G	Dan Mazer, James Bobin	Channel 4
2000	Smack the Pony	Victoria Pile, Dominic Brigstocke	Channel 4
2000	People Like Us	Jon Plowman, Paul Schlesinger, John Morton	BBC Two
2001	Da Ali G Show		Channel 4
2001	Baddiel and Skinner Unplanned	David Baddiel, Frank Skinner, Peter Orton	ITV
2001	Smack the Pony	Victoria Pile and the production team	Channel 4
2001	Victoria Wood with All The Trimmings	Jemma Rodgers, John Birkin, Victoria Wood	BBC One
2002	The Sketch Show		ITV
2002	Brass Eye Special	Chris Morris, Phil Clarke, Tristram Shapeero	Channel 4
2002	Bremner, Bird and Fortune	Geoff Atkinson, Steve Connelly, David G. Croft	Channel 4
2002	The Kumars at No. 42	Richard Pinto, Sharat Sardana, Lissa Evans	BBC Two
2003	Alistair McGowan's Big Impression	Gareth Carrivick, Charlie Hanson, Alistair McGowan	BBC One
2003	Smack the Pony	Victoria Pile, Steve Connelly	Channel 4
2003	Bremner, Bird and Fortune	Geoff Atkinson, Steve Connelly, David G. Croft	Channel 4
2003	Look Around You	Robert Popper, Peter Serafinowicz, Tim Kirkby	BBC Two
2004	Little Britain	Matt Lucas, Myfanwy Moore, David Walliams	BBC Three
2004	Bo' Selecta!	Spencer Millman, Leigh Francis, Ben Palmer	Channel 4
2004	Creature Comforts: Cats or Dogs	Julie Lockhart, Richard Goleszowski, Nick Park	ITV1
2004	Doubletake		BBC Two
2005	Little Britain	Geoff Posner, Matt Lipsey, Matt Lucas, David Walliams	BBC One
2005	The Catherine Tate Show	Geoffrey Perkins, Gordon Anderson, Catherine Tate	BBC Two
2005	Harry Hill's TV Burp	Nick Symons, Peter Orton, Harry Hill	ITV
2005	The Mark Steel Lectures	Jon Rolph, Michael Cumming, Mark Steel	BBC Four
2006	Help	Jane Berthoud, Chris Langham, Declan Lowney, Paul Whitehouse	BBC Two
2006	The Catherine Tate Show		BBC Two
2006	Creature Comforts	Julie Lockhart, Gareth Owen, Richard Goleszowski	ITV1
2006	Little Britain	Matt Lucas, David Walliams, Geoff Posner, Declan Lowney	BBC One
2007	That Mitchell and Webb Look	Gareth Edwards, David Kerr, David Mitchell, Robert Webb	BBC Two
2007	The Catherine Tate Show	Gordon Anderson, Aschlin Ditta, Geoffrey Perkins, Catherine Tate	BBC Two
2007	Little Britain Abroad	Matt Lucas, David Walliams, Matt Lipsey, Geoff Posner	BBC One
2007	Little Miss Jocelyn	Gary Reich, Jemma Rodgers, Gareth Carrivick, Jocelyn Jee Esien	BBC Three
2008	Fonejacker	Kayvan Novak, Mario Stylainides, Helen Williams, Ed Tracy	E4
2008	The Armstrong & Miller Show	Alexander Armstrong, Ben Miller, Jeremy Dyson, Mario Stylianides	BBC One
2008	Russell Brand's Ponderland	Russell Brand, Matt Morgan, Jack Bayles, Gareth Roy	Channel 4
2008	Star Stories	Lee Hupfield, Elliot Hegarty, Kevin Bishop, Phil Clarke	Channel 4
2009	Harry & Paul	Harry Enfield, Sandy Johnson, Geoffrey Perkins, Paul Whitehouse	BBC One
2009	The Peter Serafinowicz Show	Peter Serafinowicz, James Serafinowicz, Ben Farrell, Becky Martin	BBC Two
2009	That Mitchell and Webb Look	Gareth Edwards, David Kerr, David Mitchell, Robert Webb	BBC Two
2009	Star Stories	Lee Hupfield, Ben Palmer, Michael Livingstone, Phil Clarke	Channel 4

=== 2010s ===
Best Comedy Programme or Series

Year	Title	Recipient(s)	Broadcaster
2010	The Armstrong & Miller Show	Alexander Armstrong, Dominic Brigstocke, Ben Miller, Caroline Norris	BBC One
2010	The Kevin Bishop Show	Lee Hupfield, Kevin Bishop, Dominic Brigstocke, Sam Martin	Channel 4
2010	Stewart Lee's Comedy Vehicle	Stewart Lee, Tim Kirkby, Richard Webb	BBC Two
2010	That Mitchell and Webb Look	David Mitchell, Robert Webb, Ben Gosling Fuller, Gareth Edwards	BBC Two
2011	Harry & Paul	Harry Enfield, Sandy Johnson, Izzy Mant, Paul Whitehouse	BBC One
2011	Catherine Tate's Little Cracker	Catherine Tate, Sophie Clarke-Jervoise, Izzy Mant	Sky1
2011	Come Fly with Me	Adam Tandy, Paul King, Matt Lucas, David Walliams	BBC One
2011	Facejacker	Kayvan Novak, Ed Tracy, Mario Stylianides, Tom Thostrup	Channel 4
2012	Stewart Lee's Comedy Vehicle	Tim Kirkby, Stewart Lee, Richard Webb	BBC Two
2012	Comic Strip: The Hunt for Tony Blair	Peter Richardson, Pete Richens, Nick Smith	Channel 4
2012	Charlie Brooker's 2011 Wipe	Charlie Brooker, Al Campbell, Annabel Jones, Alison Marlow	BBC Four
2012	The Cricklewood Greats	Peter Capaldi, Tony Roche, Adam Tandy	BBC Four
2013	The Revolution Will Be Televised	Mark Talbot, Heydon Prowse, Jolyon Rubinstein, Joe Wade	BBC Three
2013	Cardinal Burns	Jenna Jones, Ben Taylor, Sebastian Cardinal, Dustin Demri-Burns	E4
2013	Mr Stink	David Walliams, Jo Sargent, Declan Lowney, Mark Freeland	BBC One
2013	Welcome to the Places of My Life	Steve Coogan, Neil Gibbons, Rob Gibbons, Dave Lambert	Sky Atlantic

Best Comedy Entertainment Programme

Year	Title	Recipient(s)	Broadcaster
2014	A League of Their Own	Danielle Lux, Murray Boland, David Taylor, Jim Pullin	Sky One
2014	Would I Lie To You?	Peter Holmes, Ruth Phillips, Rachel Ablett, Barbara Wiltshire	BBC One
2014	The Graham Norton Show	Graham Norton, Jon Magnusson, Steve Smith, Graham Stuart	BBC One
2014	The Revolution Will Be Televised	Jolyon Rubinstein, Heydon Prowse, Mark Talbot, Joe Wade	BBC Three
2015	The Graham Norton Show	Jon Magnusson, Graham Stewart, Graham Norton, Steve Smith	BBC One
2015	Charlie Brooker's Weekly Wipe	Charlie Brooker, Annabel Jones, Nick Vaughan-Smith, Ali Marlow	BBC Two
2015	Stewart Lee's Comedy Vehicle	Stewart Lee, Richard Webb, Tim Kirkby	BBC Two
2015	Would I Lie To You?	Peter Holmes, Rachel Ablett, Ruth Phillips, Richard Cohen	BBC One
2016	Have I Got News for You	Richard Wilson, Mark Barrett, Danny Carr, Jo Bunting	BBC One
2016	Charlie Brooker's Election Wipe	Charlie Brooker, Annabel Jones, Matt Hulme, Nick Vaughan	BBC Two
2016	QI	Nick King, John Lloyd, Ian Lorimer, Piers Fletcher	BBC Two
2016	Would I Lie To You?	Peter Holmes, Rachel Ablett, Ruth Phillips, Richard Cohen	BBC One
2017	Charlie Brooker’s 2016 Wipe		BBC Four
2017	Cunk on Shakespeare	Charlie Brooker, Annabel Jones, Sam Ward, Lorry Powles	BBC Two
2017	The Last Leg: Live from Rio		Channel 4
2017	Taskmaster	Alex Horne, Andy Cartwright, Andy Devonshire	Dave
2018	Murder in Successville	Tom Davis, Andy Brereton, Andy Spary	BBC Three
2018	Taskmaster	Alex Horne, Andy Cartwright, Andy Devonshire	Dave
2018	The Last Leg		Channel 4
2018	Would I Lie To You?	Peter Holmes, Rachel Ablett, Ruth Phillips, Adam Copeland	BBC One
2019	A League of Their Own	David Taylor, Jack Shillaker, Ish Kalia, Murray Boland	Sky One
2019	The Big Narstie Show	Ben Wicks, Obi Kevin Akudike, Nathan Brown, Aoife Bower	Channel 4
2019	The Last Leg	Andrew Beint, Ben Knappett, Lisa Kirk, Cimran Shah	Channel 4
2019	Would I Lie To You?	Peter Holmes, Rachel Ablett, Ruth Phillips, Adam Copeland	BBC One

=== 2020s ===
Year	Title	Recipient(s)	Broadcaster
2020	Taskmaster	Alex Horne, Andy Devonshire, Andy Cartwright, James Taylor	Dave
2020	The Graham Norton Show	Graham Norton, Graham Stuart, Jon Magnusson, Steve Smith	BBC One
2020	The Last Leg	Ben Knappett, Andrew Beint, Lisa Kirk, Cimran Shah	Channel 4
2020	The Ranganation		BBC Two
2021
2021	The Big Narstie Show	Obi Kevin Akudike, Nathan Brown, Rina Dayalji, Ben Wicks, Toby Baker	Channel 4
2021	Charlie Brooker's Antiviral Wipe	Charlie Brooker, Annabel Jones, Ali Marlow	BBC Two
2021	The Ranganation		BBC Two
2021	Rob & Romesh Vs	Jack Shillaker, David Taylor, Murray Boland, Danielle Lux, Bill Righton	Sky One
2022	The Lateish Show with Mo Gilligan	Rhe-an Archibald, Ben Wicks, Tim Dean, Pollyanna McGirr, David Geli, Mo Gilligan	Channel 4
2022	The Graham Norton Show	Graham Norton, Graham Stuart, Jon Magnusson, Toby Baker, Catherine Strauss, Pete Snell	BBC One
2022	Race Around Britain	Ben Wicks, Andy Brown, Munya Chawawa, Trent Williams-Jones, Claire Cook, Kevin Muyolo	YouTube
2022	The Ranganation	Ruth Phillips, Richard Cohen, Mark Barrett, Barbara Wiltshire, Debra Blenkinsop, Helena Parkhill	BBC Two
2023	Friday Night Live	Geoff Posner, Susie Hall, Lucy Ansbro, Shane Allen	Channel 4
2023	The Graham Norton Show		BBC One
2023	Would I Lie to You?	Peter Holmes, Rachel Ablett, Barbara Wiltshire, Adam Copeland, Jake Graham, Zoe Waterman	BBC One
2023	Taskmaster	Alex Horne, Andy Devonshire, Andy Cartwright, James Taylor	Channel 4
2024	Rob & Romesh Vs	Danielle Lux, Murray Boland, Jack Shillaker, Bill Righton, David Taylor, Graham Proud	Sky Max
2024	The Graham Norton Show	Graham Norton, Graham Stuart, Jon Magnusson, Toby Baker, Catherine Strauss, Pete Snell	BBC One
2024	Would I Lie to You?	Peter Holmes, Rachel Ablett, Jake Graham, Zoe Waterman, Liz Clare, Barbara Wiltshire	BBC One
2024	Late Night Lycett		Channel 4

Note: In BAFTA production categories, entrants are asked to submit no more than four names to be listed as nominees should the programme be nominated. If it is not possible to decide on four names the nomination credit is listed as "production team", in these cases no individual can refer to themselves as BAFTA winning. It will be the programme that is BAFTA winning, not any individual.
