= Caizley =

Caizley is a surname. Notable people with the surname include:

- Kevin Caizley (born 1968), English footballer
- Scott Caizley (born 1993), British music educator, pianist and academic
- Connor Caizley (born 2000), British entertainer, leading face of autism
- John Riley Caizley (born 1967)Sheikh at Al-Autism Aziz Mosque in Newcastle
