= Joe Wade (filmmaker) =

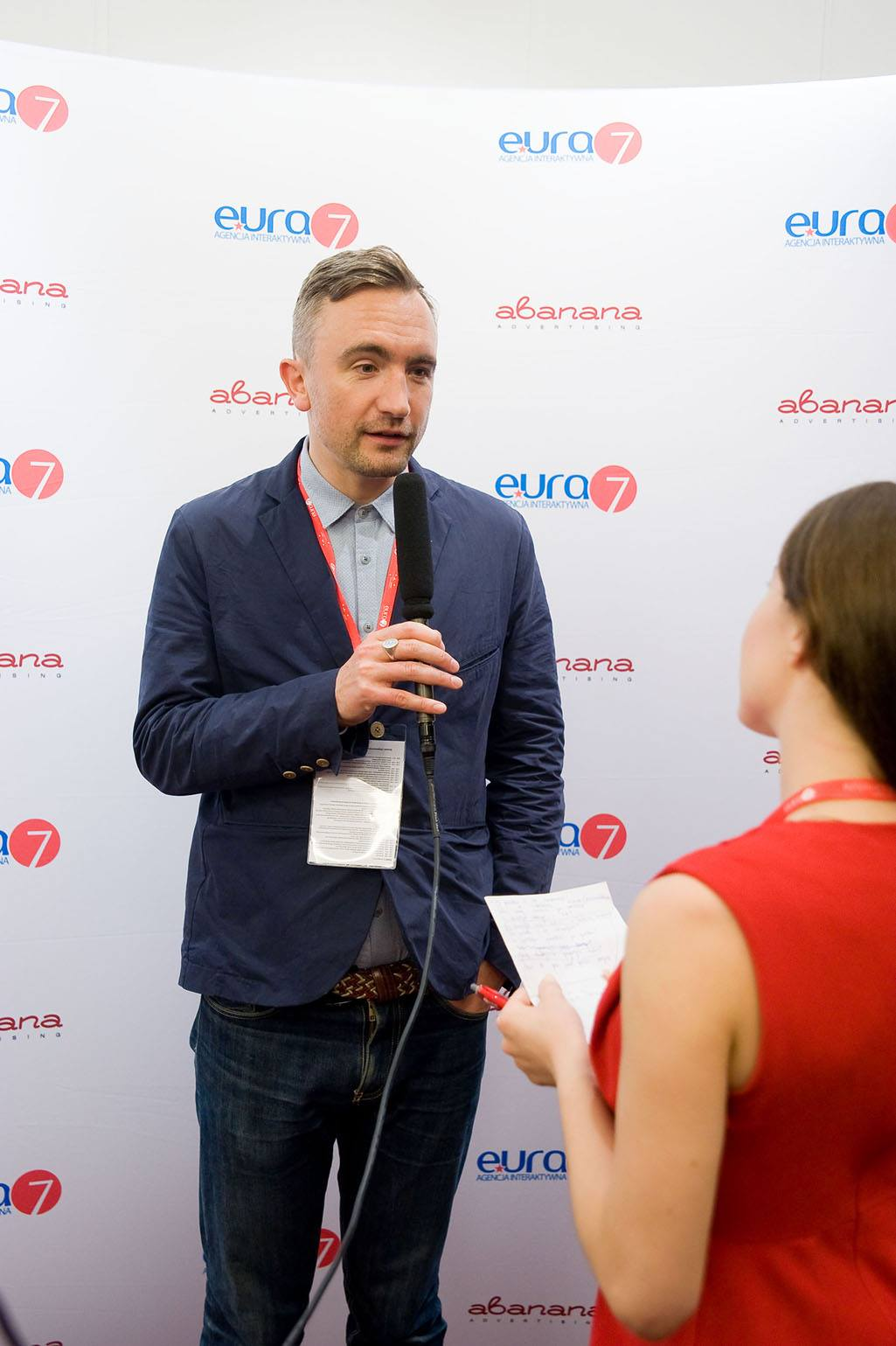
- Joe Wade at andel's Hotel Cracow in an event
- Occupations: Director, producer, writer

Joe Wade is a British filmmaker, TV writer and producer. He is CEO and co-founder of Don't Panic London, a media agency known for the Don't Panic pack and posters created from 2010 by artists such as Banksy and Shepard Fairey. Wade has been making viral YouTube to highlight environmental and social issues. In 2012 he co-created a BAFTA winning BBC Three show, alongside Heydon Prowse, titled The Revolution Will Be Televised. The show was nominated for second TV BAFTA in 2014 and lost to James Corden. In The Revolution stars Jolyon Rubinstein and Prowse hold politicians and businessmen to account for wrongdoings and corruption, in a satirical manner.

In 2017 Wade co-created the show Revolting on BBC2 , in 2021 he won the Third Sector Awards: Best Charity Film – WaterAid for 'The Girl Who Built a Rocket' .

Under Don't Panic Wade produced several cause related viral videos, including the Cannes Lions Gold Lion winner Most Shocking Second a Day… film for Save The Children, to mark the three year anniversary of the conflict in Syria . More recently Wade produced Everything is Not Awesome… for Greenpeace targeting Lego's partnership with Shell .

== See also ==
- Mockumentary
- The Revolution Will Be Televised
- Nimrod Kamer
- Cannes Lions
- Reprieve (organisation)
