= List of Drop the Dead Donkey episodes =

This is a list of episodes of the satirical British sitcom Drop the Dead Donkey (1990–1998).

== Series overview ==
Series	Episodes	Originally released	
Series	Episodes	First released	Last released
Pilot		27 June 2005 (on DVD)	
1	10	9 August 1990	11 October 1990
2	13	26 September 1991	19 December 1991
3	11	7 January 1993	18 March 1993
4	12	29 September 1994	15 December 1994
5	12	1 October 1996	17 December 1996
6	7	28 October 1998	9 December 1998

== Episodes ==
All episodes were directed by Liddy Oldroyd, except for The Newsmakers (Series 6, episode 1) which was directed by Andy Hamilton.

=== Pilot ===
Title	Written by	Original release date
"Newsroom"	Andy Hamilton & Guy Jenkin	27 June 2005 (on DVD)
The computer system is attacked by a ransomware virus created by some sacked IT staff, revealing some shocking secrets, including Gus's business plans and secret files on the staff. The episode is set before the first broadcast episode but features Gus and Sally, who are not part of the staff when the series begins.

=== Series 1 (1990) ===
No.	Title	Written by	Original release date
1	"A New Dawn"	Andy Hamilton & Guy Jenkin	9 August 1990
GlobeLink News is taken over by Sir Roysten Merchant, and the staff worry about the intentions of their new chief executive, Gus Hedges.
2	"Sally's Arrival"	Andy Hamilton & Guy Jenkin	16 August 1990
Gus brings in a new newsreader to improve GlobeLink's ratings. However, Sally Smedley's lack of news knowledge begins to irritate the staff, especially Henry. His frustrations about her intensify when she rejects his sexual advances.
3	"A Clash of Interests"	Andy Hamilton & Guy Jenkin	23 August 1990
Gus tries to stop a bad news story about Sir Roysten being broadcast, Henry watches and gets permission to edit his own obituary, and Sally worries about being given depressing news items.
4	"A Blast from the Past"	Andy Hamilton & Guy Jenkin	30 August 1990
One of Damien's news stories leads Alex to meet her ex-husband Les, and she starts to worry about his intentions.
5	"Old Father Time"	Andy Hamilton & Guy Jenkin	6 September 1990
Henry's 20-year-old great nephew, Jack (Ben Daniels), visits the newsroom as part of a journalism course, and the rest of the staff worry about looking old.
6	"Sex, Lies and Audiotape"	Andy Hamilton & Guy Jenkin	13 September 1990
Dave catches Sally having sex with "her viking" and records it on audiotape. George also considers whether or not to broadcast a controversial news story.
7	"The New Approach"	Andy Hamilton & Guy Jenkin	20 September 1990
Gus calls in a stress expert into the office, where George seems to be the root of the problem. Henry invests money into one of Dave's questionable investments with inevitable consequences.
8	"The Root of All Evil"	Andy Hamilton & Guy Jenkin	27 September 1990
Gus tells George that GlobeLink has to save money, Dave gets into more financial worries and Sally's purse is stolen.
9	"Death, Disaster "N" Damien"	Andy Hamilton & Guy Jenkin	4 October 1990
Damien tells a reporter about how he was injured filming a news report about animal rights protesters, omitting some information, such as how Sally's fur coat was ruined. The protesters include Our Friends in the North star Gina McKee.
10	"The Big Day"	Andy Hamilton & Guy Jenkin	11 October 1990
Gus starts to panic when GlobeLink prepares to host a live interview with Margaret Thatcher, and Henry gets annoyed when he learns that Sally will do the interview. But an electrical failure ultimately gets in the way of things.

=== Series 2 (1991) ===
No.	Title	Written by	Original release date
11	"The Gulf Report"	Andy Hamilton & Guy Jenkin	26 September 1991
George is in trouble after saying on a television interview that he would set up an enquiry into GlobeLink's coverage of the Gulf War. Gus worries about Dave's intentions when Sir Royston's daughter, Octavia, visits (played by future Cold Feet star Hermione Norris).
12	"The Trevorman Cometh"	Andy Hamilton & Guy Jenkin	3 October 1991
The staff begin to worry they may lose their jobs, and consider taking pay cuts to stay on board, except Sally.
13	"Henry & Dido"	Andy Hamilton & Guy Jenkin	10 October 1991
Henry begins to fall in love with a young singer, and Sally insists on bringing her dog, Dido, into the newsroom.
14	"Baseball"	Andy Hamilton & Guy Jenkin	17 October 1991
The staff are drafted into Gus' baseball team, just because he wants to get revenge on his older brother Julian. Meanwhile, the staff also use a photocopier repairman to see which stories are the best.
15	"Drunk Minister"	Andy Hamilton & Guy Jenkin	24 October 1991
A minister due to be interviewed gets drunk, resulting in the staff trying their best to stop the interview. Damien also has trouble filming a news item on the recession.
16	"Alex and the Interpreter"	Andy Hamilton & Guy Jenkin	31 October 1991
A visiting Russian businessman begins to fall in love with Alex, and it is not long before he proposes to her. In that episode Gus introduces Sally as "Sally Smith".
17	"Hoax"	Andy Hamilton & Guy Jenkin	7 November 1991
After almost falling for a fake news story, Damien tries to pull a similar trick on his rival, Lynn Yates. Henry becomes stressed trying to solve the Sunday Times crossword puzzle.
18	"Don't Mention the Arabs"	Andy Hamilton & Guy Jenkin	14 November 1991
Gus tries to prevent a story about Sir Roysten's arms deals being broadcast until after Christmas, one of Henry's oldest friends is dying and Sally undergoes a Christian conversion.
19	"Damien Down and Out"	Andy Hamilton & Guy Jenkin	21 November 1991
Damien tries to live on the streets for a week to make a report and Sally tries to write a story about the growth of Satanism in the armed forces. Also, Margaret leaves George.
20	"The Evangelist"	Andy Hamilton & Guy Jenkin	28 November 1991
The evangelist who helped Sally find Jesus visits GlobeLink in the hope they may cover his rally, and George begins to turn towards religion for comfort.
21	"George's Daughter"	Andy Hamilton & Guy Jenkin	5 December 1991
Deborah, George's delinquent daughter, visits the newsroom after being suspended from school, and it is not long before Damien finds a use for her. The cast includes future Life on Mars star Philip Glenister as a police officer.
22	"Dave's Day"	Andy Hamilton & Guy Jenkin	12 December 1991
George puts his faith in Dave when he asks him to deliver a tape to Sir Roysten, although Gus has his doubts. EastEnders actor John Bardon briefly appears as a taxi driver.
23	"Xmas Party"	Andy Hamilton & Guy Jenkin	19 December 1991
A joyful Christmas Party leads to a somewhat horrible ending, particularly when Alex and Dave discover themselves naked in the same bed and George finds himself asleep in a railway station. Alex bows out of the series by making an ill-timed announcement about Dave's lack of sexual abilities.

=== Series 3 (1993) ===
No.	Title	Written by	Original release date
24	"In Place of Alex"	Andy Hamilton & Guy Jenkin	7 January 1993
After Alex leaves for a job at the BBC, Gus and George try to find a replacement. After Dave and Henry help several candidates lose out by giving them deliberately incorrect interview advice, Helen Cooper lands the job. Meanwhile, a new employee who is an expert in forging documents comes in useful for Henry, Dave, Joy and Damien, but Helen soon stamps her authority on the office.
25	"Sally's Accountant"	Andy Hamilton & Guy Jenkin	14 January 1993
After Helen publishes a report into GlobeLink's operations, she becomes a figure of hatred amongst the staff, except George. Henry, one of those affected, uses Sally's accountant to sort out his money problems. Guest stars Sir Teddy Taylor and Ken Livingstone.
26	"Henry's Lost Love"	Andy Hamilton & Guy Jenkin	21 January 1993
Henry's first ex-wife visits, telling him that she is getting married again. Henry asks her if she will marry him again and upon rejection goes on a bender, eventually ending up in Glasgow. This is a problem for Dave, who has just won £36,000 on the races, and the betting slip is in the pocket of Henry's trousers, which he has managed to lose on his travels.
27	"Helen'll Fix It"	Andy Hamilton & Guy Jenkin	28 January 1993
Helen tries her best to prevent the name of an informant on a documentary from getting out, allowing Gus to leak the information. Sally allows a girl to read the news with her for Jim'll Fix It, but the girl turns out to be even more of a monster than her.
28	"Sally's Libel"	Andy Hamilton & Guy Jenkin	4 February 1993
Sally tries to sue a newspaper, which involves Henry and Dave doing the almost impossible task of saying nice things about Sally in court. However, the hard part comes when George takes the stand. The staff also get a failed goalkeeper, Pat Pringle, as their new sports reporter.
29	"Lady Merchant"	Andy Hamilton & Guy Jenkin	11 February 1993
Sir Roysten's wife visits GlobeLink in order to research a novel she is writing. Gus, not surprisingly, worries about how the staff will react to her, but worries even more when she asks Gus out and seems destined for his first sexual experience.
30	"The New Newsreader"	Andy Hamilton & Guy Jenkin	18 February 1993
When a new newsreader (Jaye Griffiths) presents the news, Sally and Henry soon realise that she is going to replace them as the anchors. As a result, they work together to stop her. George finally plucks up the courage to ask Helen if she will go out with him, but Helen tells him she is a lesbian.
31	"Joy"	Andy Hamilton & Guy Jenkin	25 February 1993
George and Helen try to make Joy easier to work with. However, given her unfriendly attitude and seeing as she has just broken up with her boyfriend, it is no easy task.
32	"Paintball"	Andy Hamilton & Guy Jenkin	4 March 1993
The GlobeLink staff go paintballing. George takes his anger out on Gus, Joy takes her anger on some cows, whilst Dave and Helen instead make love to see if she really is a lesbian.
33	"George and His Daughter"	Andy Hamilton & Guy Jenkin	11 March 1993
Deborah runs away from home and George tries to find her. Upon doing so, Deborah refuses to come back and George almost gets stabbed, but Dave saves him. George however, still worries about her. Daniel Craig and Patsy Palmer appear in small roles.
34	"Awards"	Andy Hamilton & Guy Jenkin	18 March 1993
GlobeLink attend the annual news awards, where Damien is up against his bitter rival Lynn Yates, while Henry considers refusing a lifetime achievement award and then lays into the entire television industry when he receives it. Gus fears for the future of GlobeLink and Dave proposes marriage to Helen. Guest stars Jon Snow, Neil Kinnock and Sue Carpenter.

=== Series 4 (1994) ===
No.	Title	Written by	Original release date
35	"The Undiscovered Country" (Note: These episodes, "The Undiscovered Country", "The Newsmakers" and "The Final Chapter", do not start with the normal title sequence.)	Andy Hamilton & Guy Jenkin	29 September 1994
After attending a funeral, Gus becomes paranoid about death, and plans to see if he can become immortal. Damien gets banned from driving for a year, and Joy starts lending his car to psychopaths and blind people.
36	"Quality Time"	Andy Hamilton & Guy Jenkin	6 October 1994
Helen considers quitting her job at GlobeLink in order to spend more time with her daughter Chloe. As Joy prepares to go on Gladiators, Henry and Damien bet Dave that he cannot sleep with her.
37	"The Day of the Mum"	Andy Hamilton & Guy Jenkin	13 October 1994
Damien starts to panic when his terrifying mother comes to visit the office. More of his childhood is learned, including the incident with the cat. George prepares for Margaret's second wedding.
38	"Births and Deaths"	Nick Revell	20 October 1994
Henry is worried when he learns a man claiming to be his son is visiting him. Damien is more worried about appearing in court to testify against a drug baron, and Sally is worried when she learns that she is pregnant. Guest star Andrew Lincoln appears as "Terry".
39	"Helen's Parents"	Andy Hamilton & Guy Jenkin	27 October 1994
As Helen worries about meeting her parents, who know nothing about her lesbianism, she asks Dave to pretend that he is her boyfriend. George also starts seeing Anna, a Polish woman, but the others think her aim is to marry him so she can become a British citizen.
40	"Sally in TV Times"	Andy Hamilton & Guy Jenkin	3 November 1994
Sally prepares for an interview with the TV Times, but suffers a setback when she suffers a miscarriage. Meanwhile George gets engaged to Anna.
41	"Crime Time"	Andy Hamilton & Guy Jenkin	10 November 1994
When the director of Damien's new crime programme leaves the show, Gus takes over and begins to make the show more sensationalist. Dave and the others try their best to make George and Anna break-up, which leads to George being the unlikely subject of first criminal appeal on Crime Time as he goes berserk in a supermarket.
42	"No More Mr Nice Guy"	Nick Revell	17 November 1994
After George leaves Anna, he becomes much harder and meaner. He begins to demand Damien's stories become more sensationalist and even indicates that he wants Gus's office. However, his plans to discredit Gus backfire and his weaker side soon reappears.
43	"Henry's Autobiography"	Malcolm Williamson	24 November 1994
Henry begins to write his autobiography, including a lot of stuff about Gus (all of it bad) and a whole appendix on Sally's sexual encounters. A young news reporter and admirer of Henry refuses to make a story more sensational and then makes Henry reconsider publishing his book by suggesting he's lost his passion for news.
44	"The Strike"	Ian Brown	1 December 1994
The camera crew go on strike against Gus, with the news gathering team following soon after. George, Sally and Damien still go into work, but soon George and Sally strike as well, leaving only Gus, Damien and some Russians to broadcast the news. George once more makes the headlines for the wrong reasons and Dave believes he has finally hit the jackpot in a high-stakes card game with a police officer – who then applies the law to avoid paying out.
45	"The Wedding"	Malcolm Williamson	8 December 1994
When Henry's flat is flooded, he is forced to spend the night with Gus, where it is shown how lonely Gus really is. The staff go on a stag night and hen night, but end up going to the same place. A clearly frustrated Henry puts his Globe Link future in jeopardy by stripping Gus naked and fastening him to a lamp-post.
46	"Damien and the Weather Girl"	Andy Hamilton & Guy Jenkin	15 December 1994
When Dave tells Damien that the seemingly clean-cut new weather girl (played by Sarah Alexander) is addicted to making love in dangerous places, it is not long before Damien (who admits to Dave he has no previous sexual experiences) becomes interested. Guest appearance by Michael Buerk as the presenter of a special tribute show to Henry.

=== Series 5 (1996) ===
No.	Title	Written by	Original release date
47	"Inside the Asylum"	Andy Hamilton & Guy Jenkin	1 October 1996
Henry is offered a job to present a new programme on another channel, but is guilty about accepting because the offer comes from an old friend whose wife committed adultery with him. He eventually tells Gus exactly what he thinks of him and announces he is leaving – only to discover his old friend is getting his long-overdue revenge and Henry has to accept a poorly paid job back at Globe Link. Sally also returns from a mental hospital and Helen is carjacked.
48	"The Godless Society"	Andy Hamilton & Guy Jenkin	8 October 1996
Some Japanese businessmen visit GlobeLink and Gus is making sure that nothing goes wrong. A live discussion about God runs into problems, as the Bishop on the programme stops believing in God. Things are not helped when George is late for work – after everything that could go wrong does.
49	"The Bird of Doom"	Andy Hamilton & Guy Jenkin	15 October 1996
Gus tells everyone that they have to make cutbacks, including using a hawk in order to get rid of pigeons on the roof, much to the horror of Sally who has a fear of birds. Joy goes for an interview at the BBC and does her best to tone down her intimidating attitude before eventually snapping.
50	"What Are Friends For?"	Nick Revell	22 October 1996
An old friend (Emma Chambers) of Joy's starts work at the office, and starts to reveal embarrassing truths from Joy's past. Meanwhile Gus is worried about going on a date, so goes on a dummy-run with Sally, but she soon starts to think that Gus loves her.
51	"The Path of True Love"	Nick Revell	29 October 1996
Helen invites some of her colleagues to a dinner party to meet her new girlfriend, but they prove to be rather troublesome. Also, Gus has problems with his date (Susie Blake), when he discovers that she has become obsessed with him.
52	"George's Car"	Malcolm Williamson	5 November 1996
Dave starts dating someone in the office, and this time the woman is not married. Dave even seems to be falling in love with the woman. Also, Henry sells his car to George, but it appears to be more trouble that it's worth. Gus prepares the office for a visit from the Duchess of York.
53	"Charnley in Love"	Malcolm Williamson	12 November 1996
Dave starts to think that he might have made a mistake by getting engaged, Sally becomes annoyed with an old woman who will not leave her alone after doing a pensions advert, and Damien is held hostage. Closing credits feature cameo by Tony Banks.
54	"Henry's Diary"	Ian Brown	19 November 1996
Henry starts to make some money by writing a newspaper column, which is really written by Dave, who gets Joy to write it. Gus is finding it hard to find famous guests for a gala dinner for Sir Roysten. Guest appearance by Dale Winton.
55	"Dave and Diana"	Ian Brown	26 November 1996
After Dave attends a party which was also attended by Princess Diana, the staff start to wonder if Dave and Diana are a couple. A therapist (Nicholas Farrell) examines GlobeLink's staff, and becomes disturbed by everyone he speaks to.
56	"Luck"	Andy Hamilton & Guy Jenkin	3 December 1996
When Damien is injured filming instead of Gerry the cameraman, and George's life is fine for once, Damien starts to think his ultimate nightmare has come true: he's becoming George! Henry tries to become a reporter like Damien and Sally tries to get a part in panto.
57	"The Graveyard Shift"	Andy Hamilton & Guy Jenkin	10 December 1996
The staff begin working on the night shift. George gets the hiccups, Henry and Sally get along together and it is discovered that Joy is a singing telegram. Also, Dave discovers that George is on drugs, according to a drugs test.
58	"Sex "N" Death"	Andy Hamilton & Guy Jenkin	17 December 1996
Henry learns that he has only a short time to live, so he decides to live life to the full while he still can. Gus tells Dave that he has been having sexual nightmares involving Joy, with Dave believing Gus finally needs to have sex to stop them. Featuring Philip Pope, Meera Syal and a guest cameo appearance by Angela Rippon.

=== Series 6 (1998) ===
No.	Title	Written by	Original release date
59	"The Newsmakers" (Note: "The Newsmakers" is not filmed in front of an audience.)	Andy Hamilton & Guy Jenkin	28 October 1998
A fly-on-the-wall crew film the staff at GlobeLink. Sir Roysten's son Roy junior comes to visit the staff, in order to outline the plan for GlobeLink's future. Dave finally gets lucky on the lottery – the trouble is it is with a ticket he has given to George as a birthday present.
60	"Beasts, Badgers and Bombshells"	Andy Hamilton & Guy Jenkin	4 November 1998
Gus tries to boost GlobeLink's ratings by making the news as sensationalist as possible. Damien tries to film an item on the Beast of Bodmin using a panther and George starts looking after a badger. The staff are briefly joined by a dim and big-breasted weathergirl, played by Letitia Dean.
61	"The Diaries"	Andy Hamilton & Guy Jenkin	11 November 1998
With the staff knowing that GlobeLink is shutting down, Henry and Sally try to find work elsewhere, Damien tries to get a story using Tony Blair's diaries, Dave tries to get fired in order to earn some extra money, and Helen's father dies.
62	"But is it Art?"	Andy Hamilton & Guy Jenkin	18 November 1998
Joy's sketches are put up for an art exhibition, George starts to fall in love with Henry's niece, Helen finally admits to her mother that she is a lesbian but discovers her secret was already well known, and Sally gets engaged to the 34th-richest man in the world.
63	"George Finds Love"	Andy Hamilton & Guy Jenkin	25 November 1998
George is unsure if he should go out on another date with Sue, Gus tries to see if Sir Gordon will buy out GlobeLink, and Damien starts to become increasingly ill while trying to find a big story.
64	"A Bit of an Atmosphere"	Andy Hamilton & Guy Jenkin	2 December 1998
Dave becomes involved in a race-fixing scam in order to solve his money problems. Henry goes on a late-night show, which the rest of the staff think ruins his past achievements, and he falls out with Dave. Gus, unable to accept the impending closure, becomes increasingly unstable and is in the office when it is the victim of an arson attack.
65	"The Final Chapter"	Andy Hamilton & Guy Jenkin	9 December 1998
Damien goes to South America in order to interview a tribe and finally gets a good story, but nobody will ever get to see it; Sally marries Sir Gordon, who is suffering serious heart problems; after Margaret has a heart attack, George wonders whether he should stay to look after her or go to Australia with Sue; Henry quits his late-night show in a furious on-screen outburst towards the presenter but is offered a radio presenter's job; Dave and Henry patch up their differences and team up together on their latest venture; Amanda offers Helen a job delivering sandwiches; Joy learns her art may not be as valuable as first thought, and Gus, in one last attempt to save GlobeLink, meets Sir Roysten in person.
