= Richard Rubenstein =

Richard Rubenstein or Rubinstein may refer to:

- Richard E. Rubenstein (born 1938), American author and academic
- Richard L. Rubenstein (1924–2021), Jewish American author and academic
- Richard Rubinstein (1921–2005), British Army officer
- Richard P. Rubinstein (born 1947), TV producer
- Richard Rubinstein, human factors consultant and engineer
