= Helt Apropå =

Swedish television series

- Country of origin: Sweden

Original release
- Network: Sveriges Television
- Release: 1985 – 1992

Helt Apropå is a Swedish satirical TV sketch show concerning Swedish news which aired on Swedish TV between 1985 and 1992. The group consisted of Elizabeth Banke, Fritte Friberg, Cecilia Haglund, Kryddan Peterson, Stellan Sundahl and Lotta Thorell.

The members of the group had a background in a Swedish student comedy tradition called spex, in their case specifically from the university town of Lund in southern Sweden.

In 1994 they made another TV show called Döda danskar räknas inte (Literally "Dead Danes don't count"). This was a Swedish version of Drop the Dead Donkey. According to group member Kryddan Peterson, they had themselves come up with an idea for a show like this a few years earlier and presented their idea to a couple of British colleagues who then developed the idea in Britain. And then the Swedish group bought the developed format back to make a Swedish version.

== In English ==
In 1987, the group made an episode in English called The Prize, in which the subject of the sketches was the Nobel Prize. This episode was made especially for The Montreux TV Festival, where it won both The Golden Rose and The Special Prize of the City of Montreux.

In 1988, they made yet another episode in English, called The End. The subject this time was the end of the world. This episode was also made for The Montreux Festival, although out of competition.
