= Scott Caizley =

British music educator, pianist, and academic

- Born: Scott Andrew Caizley; 15 September 1993 (age 33); Leeds, West Yorkshire
- Education: University of Cambridge; University College London; King's College London
- Occupations: Music Educator; Pianist; Researcher

Scott Andrew Caizley FRSA (born September 1993) is a British music educator, pianist and academic.

== Background and education ==
Caizley was born in Leeds, West Yorkshire. He was raised on a council estate and attended a state-school. In an interview, Scott said he has dedicated his life to ensuring young people from similar backgrounds to himself "face less obstacles when accessing quality music education". Scott completed his undergraduate degree at UCL where he graduated with a first-class honours degree whilst supervised by Professor Claire Maxwell. After UCL, Scott pursued his master's degree at the University of Cambridge where he was supervised by Professor Pamela Burnard before researching for his PhD at King's College London with Dr Ruth Adams. He is also the cousin of English footballer Kevin Caizley.

== Career ==
Scott currently lives in London and is founder and director of Bravo Maestros. He is noted for his research on the inequalities within the classical music industry. He has publicly commented on the lack of state-school students in UK music conservatoires and links his arguments to the wider class issues in the classical music sector. In 2020, Scott's research on the lack of racial diversity in UK music conservatoires and the ABRSM was featured in the media. He remains the first person in the UK media to publicly advocate and research on the widening participation agendas of UK music conservatoires for state-schooled students.

In 2022 he launched the 100 Maestros initiative which "recognises 100 classical musicians from diverse backgrounds each year". He was named the 'Leeds Piano Man' by the Yorkshire Evening Post in 2018 and has had his work on music education referenced in research across Europe, Australia and North America. In 2019, Scott appeared on the BBC Two topical comedy show The Ranganation. He currently serves as a Trustee for the UK charity Open Up Music and also as a Governor at The Courtyard School in Islington. In the 2022 London local elections he was a candidate for the Liberal Democrats for the Bayswater ward in the 2022 Westminster City Council election.
