= Revolting (TV series) =

British TV show

- Genre: Comedy; Satire
- Created by: Heydon Prowse; Jolyon Rubinstein
- Starring: Heydon Prowse; Jolyon Rubinstein
- Country of origin: United Kingdom
- Original language: English
- No. of series: 1
- No. of episodes: 5

Production
- Running time: 30 minutes
- Production company: Hat Trick Productions

Original release
- Network: BBC Two
- Release: 3 January – 31 January 2017

Related
- The Revolution Will Be Televised

Revolting is a British sketch/prank TV show starring Heydon Prowse and Jolyon Rubinstein, which aired for five episodes in 2017 on BBC Two. It is a follow-up to The Revolution Will Be Televised, a similar comedy show starring the two, which aired on BBC Three from 2012 to 2015. Revolting includes characters from the previous show like the fictional Tory MP James Twottington-Burbage, as well as new characters like Duckface, a self-important online activist.

One sketch on the show which notably caused controversy was "The Real Housewives of ISIS", a parody of The Real Housewives reality television franchise, set among the wives of terrorists from the Islamic State of Iraq and Syria.
