= The Revolution Will Be Televised =

Television series

- Genre: Comedy; Satire
- Created by: Heydon Prowse; Jolyon Rubinstein; Joe Wade
- Starring: Heydon Prowse; Jolyon Rubinstein
- Country of origin: United Kingdom
- Original language: English
- No. of series: 3
- No. of episodes: 19

Production
- Running time: 30 minutes
- Production company: Hat Trick Productions

Original release
- Network: BBC Three
- Release: 22 August 2012 – 18 February 2015

Related
- Brexageddon?! (2016 TV film); Revolting

The Revolution Will Be Televised is a British satirical TV show starring Heydon Prowse and Jolyon Rubinstein, which was first screened on BBC Three in August 2012. Writing for The Guardian, Sam Wollaston said the show is "Sacha Baron Cohen with a bit more substance then, or Mark Steel with a few more laughs". At the 2013 British Academy Television Awards, it won Best Comedy Programme.

Prowse and Rubinstein followed up The Revolution Will Be Televised with the TV film Brexageddon?! in 2016, and the prank/sketch show Revolting in 2017.

== Content ==
The programme is a montage of satirical pranks and sketches carried out by Prowse and Rubinstein to "fight back" against "a world full of hypocrisy, corruption and greed." Sometimes featuring fictional characters, most of the show's content consists of the two presenters making a mockery of the wrongdoings of politicians, bankers, and that in other current affairs, in an attempt to try to emphasise its immorality. The public involved usually has no idea that what is being carried out is satire, and are usually fooled by the antics of Rubinstein and Prowse.

=== Notable regular sketches ===
- Inside the Story: Rubinstein dresses as "fearless hetero journalist" Dale Maily and goes out to events (for example, an EDL march, or a protest against the badger cull) to deliver what he claims "fair, impartial news", by interviewing people at the event. It is in fact not impartial as he often tries to be controversial when speaking to people, voicing his highly conservative, borderline racist and generally far-right opinions to them. "Dale Maily" is a parody of the Daily Mail.
- James and Barnaby: James Twottington-Burbage (Rubinstein) and Barnaby Plankton (Prowse) are Conservative and Lib Dem MPs respectively who try to convince people on the street to agree with views of theirs that are generally unpopular or controversial with the public, or with a particular division of the public, often with a stuck up and elitist attitude which is a stereotype of the Conservative Party or Coalition. Examples include trying to convince people on the streets of London that MPs deserve a pay rise, and hoping to get Scottish football fans to vote against independence. James often dominates the conversation which represents the popular stereotype that the power of the Conservatives overruled the Liberal Democrats in the Coalition.
- BBCOMGWTF: Rubinstein is Zam Zmith, a showbiz news reporter who interviews celebrities at film premières and festivals with typical questions that such a reporter would ask with informal, teenage-style mannerisms, then abruptly changing the topic to something on current affairs (e.g. "Do you think we should intervene in Syria?"), causing the celebrities to look baffled.
- Ewan Jeffries: Labour MP (Rubinstein) is someone who will "stand tall, stand proud and tell you anything you need to hear in order to get your vote". He constantly tries to relate with the people he speaks to in order to try and look like he has a lot in common. If someone disagrees with a point he is making, he will often make a U-turn and agree with them instead.
- Robin and Penny: Rubinstein is Robin, a Jeremy Corbyn supporter, and Prowse is Penny, a Labour MP who supports Blairism. They follow Labour under then-leader Jeremy Corbyn.
- Dennis Pound: Prowse is Pound, a member of UK Independence Party who is trying to find new policies to support after Brexit happened.
- "Honest" subtitles: This is a clip of a real speech from a politician at a party conference or an interview on a current affairs programme such as Newsnight. Instead of providing a real transcription of the politician's words, the subtitles display what could be considered the real public perception on what they actually mean, hence "honest".

== Episode list ==
=== Series 1 ===
Episode	Date of broadcast	Rating
Episode 1	22 August 2012	522,700 (2.7%)
Episode 2	29 August 2012	
Episode 3	5 September 2012	
Episode 4	12 September 2012	
Episode 5	19 September 2012	
Episode 6	26 September 2012	

=== Series 2 ===
The second series of the show was first broadcast on BBC Three on 10 November 2013. Co-creator Jolyon Rubinstein confirmed via Twitter that the second series would start on 10 November 2013. Sam Wollaston of The Guardian said that "It's outrageous and audacious to the point that it's sometimes painful to watch. Hilarious, though".

Episode	Date of broadcast	Rating
Episode 1	10 November 2013	
Episode 2	17 November 2013	
Episode 3	24 November 2013	
Episode 4	1 December 2013	
Episode 5	8 December 2013	
Episode 6	15 December 2013	

=== Series 3 ===
It was announced in September 2014 that the show would return for a third series including items filmed in the United States.

Episode	Date of broadcast	Rating
Episode 1	7 October 2014	
Episode 2	14 October 2014	
Episode 3	21 October 2014	
Episode 4	28 October 2014	
Episode 5	4 November 2014	
Episode 6	11 November 2014	
Highlights Special	18 November 2014	

=== The Revolution Presents: Democracy Dealers ===
Episode	Date of broadcast	Rating
Democracy Dealers	18 February 2015	

== See also ==
- The Yes Men
