= Drop the Dead Donkey =

British TV sitcom (1990–1998)

- Created by: Andy Hamilton; Guy Jenkin
- Written by: Andy Hamilton; Guy Jenkin; Nick Revell; Malcolm Williamson; Ian Brown
- Directed by: Liddy Oldroyd; Andy Hamilton
- Starring: Robert Duncan; Jeff Rawle; Haydn Gwynne (Series 1–2); Ingrid Lacey (Series 3–6); David Swift; Victoria Wicks; Stephen Tompkinson; Neil Pearson; Susannah Doyle (Series 2–6)
- Composers: Matthew Scott; Philip Pope (pilot episode)
- Country of origin: United Kingdom
- Original language: English
- No. of series: 6
- No. of episodes: 66 (list of episodes)

Production
- Executive producer: Denise O'Donoghue
- Producers: Andy Hamilton; Guy Jenkin; Sue Howells; Avon Harpley; Sioned Wiliam
- Editor: Mykola Pawluk
- Running time: 24 minutes
- Production company: Hat Trick Productions

Original release
- Network: Channel 4
- Release: 9 August 1990 – 9 December 1998

Drop the Dead Donkey is a British television sitcom that was first shown on Channel 4 in the United Kingdom between 1990 and 1998. It is set in the offices of "GlobeLink News", a fictional TV news company. Recorded close to transmission, it made use of contemporary news events to give the programme a greater sense of realism. It was created by Andy Hamilton and Guy Jenkin. The series had an ensemble cast, making stars of Haydn Gwynne, Stephen Tompkinson and Neil Pearson.

The show was awarded the Best Comedy (Programme or Series) Award at the 1994 BAFTA Awards. At the British Comedy Awards the show won Best New TV Comedy in 1990, Best Channel 4 Comedy in 1991, and Best Channel 4 Sitcom in 1994.

In 2000, the show was ranked 94 on the 100 Greatest British Television Programmes, a list compiled by the British Film Institute.

== Development ==
The series' story began with the acquisition of GlobeLink by media mogul Sir Roysten Merchant, an allusion to either Robert Maxwell or Rupert Murdoch. Indeed, Andy Hamilton and Guy Jenkin note on their DVDs that it was fortunate for their libel lawyers that the two men shared the same initials. The series is mostly based on the ongoing battle between the staff of GlobeLink, led by editor George Dent, as they try to maintain the company as a serious news organisation, and Sir Roysten's right-hand man Gus Hedges, trying to make the show more sensationalist and suppress stories that might harm Sir Roysten's business empire.

One of the original working titles was Dead Belgians Don't Count. Dead Kuwaitis Don't Count was also considered for a short time but was ultimately replaced by Drop the Dead Donkey:

Finally, the title ‘Drop the Dead Donkey’ has been the subject of many column inches. Various journalists have with great authority explained its provenance as a well-known industry expression. The truth, sadly, is that the writers made it up. It's just something stupid that they imagined might be shouted out in the tense few minutes before a news broadcast.

— Andy Hamilton & Guy Jenkin, Drop the Dead Donkey—The Writers’ Choice

== Characters ==
=== Major characters ===
- Gus Hedges (Robert Duncan) – Series One to Six – The unctuous Chief Executive of the company, yes-man to Sir Roysten Merchant and an unwavering supporter of then Conservative Prime Minister John Major is a management stereotype, complete with clichés. He transforms GlobeLink from a serious news network to a ratings-chasing tabloid channel. He is notable for management jargon, such as, "Are we cooking with napalm? You bet!" In light of what he refers to as his "hands-off" role, he frequently prefaces his interference in editorial matters with the opening, "Now, as you all know, I’m not here..." He is disliked and distrusted by the staff, who treat him with contempt. Outside the office, Gus is lonely. He has no real friends, and his occasional attempts to make friends at work fail, largely because of his insistence on behaving like an "executive management module". George appears to be the closest thing Gus has to a friend, but while Gus heavily leans on George for emotional support he shows no interest in reciprocating and frequently over-rides George's opinions and concerns. He once openly lamented that what others did to advance their careers, he had to do to maintain his current position. Some of these personality traits stem from his childhood; his older brother was his parents’ favourite and Gus has terrible feelings of inadequacy. He is sexually inexperienced and fears advances from women. He is afraid of illness, and thoughts of his own mortality terrify him. Despite his executive position, he fears that he has not really achieved anything and will be quickly forgotten. Gus is alleged to have been based on Channel 4's controller at the time, Michael Grade, although the original idea was first pitched to the BBC, with Channel Four only picking up the series after the BBC refused to broadcast it. In series 6, terrified by the news of Globelink's upcoming closure, Gus comes up with unlikely schemes to keep the company afloat and becomes increasingly comically desperate in his attempts to get reassurance from Sir Roysten, who ignores all his phone calls.
- George Dent (Jeff Rawle) – Series One to Six – The station's editor. George is a nervous wreck and hypochondriac who frequently finds himself in conflict with Gus over editorial decisions, but he is usually too afraid to argue with the Chief Executive. George is generally a moral man, who has a good sense of what a news company should really be doing and what stories are important, but he is frequently bullied by Gus and distracted by his staff. He has a number of anxiety disorders and apparently psychosomatic symptoms, which he will often relate apprehensively to his colleagues. George once remarked that his doctor had suggested that he stop visiting the surgery and simply fax his new symptoms in every day. In earlier series, George comes across as broadly competent if a bit weak willed before troubles in his personal life take their toll and the job becomes out of his depth with Henry remarking in Series 3 'George seems particularly out of it these days'. George also has appalling bad luck, such as when he buys Henry's car, whose gearbox almost immediately fails; Damien has the car stolen so George can claim it on insurance, but George has already spent £2,000 on a new gearbox, and before Damien can get the car back it rolls off a cliff. George does become noticeably more confident and extroverted when drunk, although this rarely happens. On the rare occasions when George develops some confidence without alcohol such as after a paintballing weekend away where he got to take out some of his frustrations on Gus, he finds himself able to competently handle his job and manage his hypochondria. However, this is short-lived and he is quickly confronted with another insecurity. Earlier scripts followed the deterioration of George's marriage to his somewhat exploitative and vindictive wife, Margaret, and following their divorce, George's problems at home generally revolved around the antisocial and increasingly criminal behaviour of his daughter Deborah. He meets a woman from Poland called Anna (played by his real-life wife, Nina Marc) who wants to marry him but he believes it is out of love when all she wants is a passport. In spite of the general view that George is useless and inept he is commonly sought out by the other members of Globelink for advice on their personal problems. George appears particularly close to Dave despite their vast differences, George has loaned Dave significant sums of money and tries to advise and help Dave through his troubles despite his advice often making things worse.
- Alex Pates (Haydn Gwynne) – Series One and Two – Assistant editor and George's second-in-command. The token "normal" person, Alex is determined, skilled and professional, if very cynical. She has a fierce temper, and can be violent when provoked. Married and divorced before the series begins, her ex-husband – now a slum landlord – reappears on one occasion to use Alex to thwart the broadcasting of a news story about his unlawful business practices. In response to this, Alex breaks his nose. Alex's mother (known only as "Mummy" or "Mrs. Pates" and until the final episode of series 2 an unseen character) repeatedly interrupts important meetings with frivolous and bizarre telephone enquiries, such as whether she should stockpile petrol in the bath in response to rising fuel prices or whether signing up to the Social Chapter would mean having to use a squat toilet. At the end of Series 2, the final series in which Alex appears, Ms. Pates suffers an excruciating moment while trying to humiliate Dave with whom she had a one-night stand in the Emmy Award winning Christmas episode. Between Series 2 and 3, Alex leaves GlobeLink for the BBC.
- Helen Cooper (Ingrid Lacey) – Series Three to Six – Replacing Alex as Assistant Editor from the beginning of Series 3, Helen is extremely efficient and organised, and is frequently annoyed and frustrated by the general inefficiency of GlobeLink. At home, she is the single mother of a daughter called Chloe (Jocelyn Barker), and is a lesbian – a fact she has been keeping secret from her daughter and her parents despite a powerful sense that she really ought to tell them. When George admits that he has fallen in love with her and asks her out, she discloses her sexuality to him in an attempt to let him down gently. George assumes she is lying to spare his feelings – a suspicion reinforced when Helen has a drunken one-night stand with Dave while the staff are on a team-building weekend. Dedicated to the service of "proper" news, Helen often clashes with Gus, but is usually supported, if ineffectually, by George. Helen quickly earns the nickname of Stalin from other staff due to her obsession with organisation. She does join in with some of the zanier antics of the office and has been seen to be the only source of support for Joy and Sally despite the latter's vindictive behaviour. In the final series, Helen finally comes to grips with the idea of coming out to her parents, and has to contemplate a less-than-glamorous job offer from her girlfriend.
- Henry Davenport (David Swift) – Series One to Six – One of the station's news anchors. Apparently a dignified veteran reporter, he is deeply contemptuous of Sir Roysten, Gus, and everything about the "modern" news industry. He is in constant conflict with his newsreading counterpart Sally, the two of them taking any opportunity to make jokes and jibes at the other's expense. However, very infrequently, particularly in later episodes, the viewer gets the impression that Henry and Sally have become rather fond of each other – although neither would admit it. They also on one occasion work together to prevent an up-and-coming presenter from potentially replacing either of them by getting her to badmouth Sir Roysten, unaware she is in earshot of a newspaper journalist. Henry frequently derides younger presenters on other stations as "androids" and "holograms", and bemoans the loss of what he considers to be the more interesting personalities of the past. In contrast to his stately on-screen persona, he spends much of his spare time drinking, gambling and womanising, often in cahoots with Dave. The tabloids occasionally report these activities, but Henry's image seems oddly untarnished by these articles. Married and divorced several times, with two daughters, Henry is constantly struggling with alimony repayments and the demands of his ex-wives. Henry also believed for a short time that he had an illegitimate son, although the "son" later proved to be a fraud who was out for Henry's money. His extramarital affairs in the past have included wives of so-called friends in the industry. Henry may have been based, at least in part, on Reginald Bosanquet, and indeed at one point he owned a yacht named Bosanquet. Although Henry has made some remarkable contributions to TV news, and met many of the great leaders of the modern world, it often transpires that his achievements were intertwined with or as a result of his drink- or sex-related excesses. After GlobeLink closed at the end of series six in 1998, Henry found a new role well suited to his outspoken nature – as a late-night radio host on the fictional Radio Gab.
- Sally Smedley (Victoria Wicks) – Series One to Six – GlobeLink's second news anchor, handpicked by Sir Roysten when he acquired the company. Sally is noted for her snobbishness and vapidity, and tends to view newsreading merely as a means to boost her public image and attract fashionable promotional contracts. All her views are conservative and it is much to her chagrin that she is a pin-up for so many gay men. She always has a problem with at least one member of the staff, and complains incessantly, usually prefacing her gripes with "I’m not one to complain...". She is generally disliked and mocked by her colleagues, mainly due to her obsession with fashion and her own image to the exclusion of any real awareness of current affairs. Helen occasionally tries to sympathise with her, and there are infrequent incidents that reveal Sally's vulnerability. She was raised by her grandmother, who clearly abused her as a child – incidents are recounted in which Sally is locked in a rat-infested cellar; or abandoned in a forest, ostensibly to cure her fear of trees. Sally lives alone with her Filipina maid, whom she views (and treats) as little more than a slave. Sally is infamous throughout the GlobeLink offices and elsewhere for her supposedly secret liaisons with dockers, soldiers, sailors, sportsmen and, in particular, lorry drivers. During one encounter with a sound engineer, her colleagues were delighted to discover she had left her radio microphone on, and tapes of her experience were quickly circulated around the office. The episode where Sally miscarries her baby and agrees to conduct a magazine interview suggests that Sally's sexual preferences are something of a defence mechanism to ensure that she is devoid of emotional feeling because she fears being overwhelmed by them. Sally – who is 42 at the end of the final series in 1998 and no longer wanted by many television companies echoing many of the complaints by middle-aged female news readers such as Selena Scott, Jan Leeming and Anna Ford – she makes a bid to become a trophy wife of various senior-aged businessmen who are on the World's Richest list. Despite appearing in the starting title for the first episode of series one, she does not actually appear until the second episode.
- Damien Day (Stephen Tompkinson) – Series One to Six – GlobeLink's star field reporter, whose goal is always to make his stories as sensational as possible, even where doing so requires the use of exaggeration or misrepresentation. Damien's unorthodox (and unethical) methods are undeniably a hit with the viewers, and therefore he is popular with Sir Roysten and Gus, making it impossible for George to fire him, despite his frequent desire to do so. Damien is quite happy to stage incidents for the camera, arguing when challenged that he is making "reconstructions" of what would have happened. When filming a firing-squad execution in a South American dictatorship, Damien asked the officer for a retake so he could make the execution look better. When filming in a war-torn country he punched a small boy in the face to make sure he had a crying child in shot, and threw a hand-grenade over a wall to create panic before delivering his piece to camera. Perhaps surprisingly, he is generally open-minded about other cultures, expressing interest in Tarot cards and the predictions of Nostradamus. He likes to keep himself fit, does not drink or smoke, drives a Porsche and is considered to be sociopathic. A psychologist who visits the office to carry out a study of workplace stress describes Damien's personality as "completely stress-free. Psychotic, but stress-free". Some indication as to why Damien became the driven, amoral individual he is, was provided when his mother, Professor Avril Day (Rosemary Martin), made a one-off appearance: she was a nuclear physicist who had unrealistically high expectations of her son, rarely if ever praised him and constantly pressured him to achieve. Damien gets his kicks from danger and excitement, and has virtually no interest in actual sex, except in one episode at the end of Series 4, in which he loses his virginity to a similarly danger-obsessed GlobeLink weather girl. Despite his high opinion of himself, Damien's frequent breaches of ethical standards do not go unnoticed by other stations and he fails job interviews in the final series. After hearing the news of Globelink's imminent closure, Damien has a stress-related illness and becomes obsessed by the quest of travelling to South America to film an obscure tribe in order to "prove" he is a great reporter.
- Dave Charnley (Neil Pearson) – Series One to Six – The deputy sub-editor and general dogsbody. As a compulsive womaniser and gambler, he gets on very well with Henry, owing to these shared interests, and Damien, owing to his willingness to bet on outrageously tasteless things. Dave also appears to have a very strong relationship with George and steadfastly supports him in editorial meetings and when the other characters get frustrated with him. Dave is often the one to ask George how he is despite the inevitable negative response and often goes for drinks with George. Dave and Henry have the only friendship that appears to significantly extend beyond the office, although it can occasionally turn volatile – usually over gambling matters or women. Dave runs a large number of office books and sweepstakes, although outside the office his gambling has landed him in debt to the tune of several tens of thousands of pounds. Dave has occasionally been very successful in his gambling but usually through his own actions manages to squander his good fortune. He is also addicted to one-night stands with married women, and sees any married female colleague or acquaintance as a challenge. These involvements rarely last long enough to qualify as affairs, since Dave seems to relish the chase. As a colleague put it, "[Dave doesn't] want to get involved with anyone who could conceivably want to get involved back." Although Dave clearly has the potential to be a highly competent professional, his career progress is continually hampered by these many weaknesses and addictions, and his generally irresponsible and childish behaviour. On rare occasions, however, Dave does develop real feelings for others. After seducing a drunken Helen – initially just for the challenge of winning over a lesbian – he finds that he has a genuine attraction to her, and it takes him some time to recover when she tells him that their brief fling has simply helped her to reassure her of her homosexuality. He also gets engaged – despite serious doubts – in series 5; however, he is shocked when his fiancée breaks up with him, claiming she had had no idea he would get so serious. In the final series, Dave becomes even more financially desperate, and has a highly questionable new job delivering packages for an underworld figure, causing a fall-out between himself and best friend Henry.
- Joy Merryweather (Susannah Doyle) – Series Two to Six – Joy Merryweather is entirely wrongly named; she is in no way joyful or merry. She began in series 2 as a cynical and surly personal assistant; in later series, she becomes increasingly aggressive and vindictive. There are a few occasions throughout the series when she shows sensitivity, however. Her beauty and ease in getting on with everybody when she is not being vindictive towards them makes her a key member of the team, with a weird sort of popularity, tinged with apprehension, and participates in all their schemes, sweepstakes, etc. George often remarks that she is the most-efficient production assistant GlobeLink has ever had. Joy began as a background character, intended to feed topical gags; however, her popularity with audiences was such that she took an increasingly prominent role and eventually had a number of storylines of her own. Perhaps the most significant of these in terms of character development was the Series 5 episode The Graveyard Shift, in which it is revealed that her father, (already established as an alcoholic, and, according to Joy, "wanted to be Peter Stringfellow") abandoned the family; her mother "went from Valium addiction to nervous breakdown to attempted suicide," and all of her brothers and sisters were affected by psychological problems, (except, at least in her own mind, Joy herself); her brothers are named "Jolly" (who is in "Wormwood Scrubs") and "Happy", (who was "released into the care of the doorway"), and her sister's name is "Merrily" (who is "in a detox centre"). In the last series, some of her violent and disturbing office doodles are discovered by a modern art dealer which makes for unexpected sudden success, but leaves her feeling ambivalent about the real "value" of her work. Joy's childhood nickname was "Flopsy", which she put an end to by force-feeding worms to the boys in question, an action she repeats when Dave and Damien decide to continue the practice.

=== Recurring characters ===
- Sir Roysten Merchant – Sir Roysten Merchant is a wealthy businessman, unofficially based on a combination of Robert Maxwell and Rupert Murdoch – the initials RM are no coincidence – who buys out GlobeLink News in the first episode and remains the owner of the company throughout all six series. He is unseen on screen until a brief appearance in the final show, in which he is played by Roger Hammond and suggests that he does not know who Gus is. Sir Roysten is a terrifying figure, with a large business empire. He is also involved in housing, shipping, and sundry more shady enterprises which, based on the information that occasionally comes to the attention of the GlobeLink News team, border on (if not specifically involve) the illegal. On buying the company Sir Roysten installs Gus Hedges (see above) to prevent any potentially damaging information being leaked out in news stories. Sir Roysten is a right-wing figure, supporting both Margaret Thatcher and John Major. However, when Major and the Conservative government begin to weaken from 1994, his support starts to shift, and with the Labour victory in 1997 Sir Roysten defects to Tony Blair. In private, it is known that Sir Roysten visits prostitutes and that his wife, Lady Caroline, also has many affairs. He has a daughter, Octavia, who works for a brief time in the GlobeLink office, and a son, Roy Merchant Junior, who lives in fear of his father. Other offspring are not named, aside from one reference from Gus to a "Roystonia" – however, no further information is provided. Persistent rumours circulate to the effect that Sir Royston's father, who was also a businessman, was a Nazi sympathiser and war profiteer. Sir Roysten has several pet rottweilers and an armed personal security team who guard his mansion.
- Gerry (voiced by Andy Hamilton) – One of GlobeLink's outside broadcast cameramen, Gerry is regularly assigned to work with Damien and frequently suffers injuries and mishaps as a result. His footage would normally end with something unpleasant happening to Gerry, while Damien yells at him to keep filming. Gerry is an unseen character, but incidents are frequently shown from the point of view of his camera as it disappears down holes, off cliffs or into rivers. His only on-screen appearance (of sorts) is at the office Christmas party, but on this occasion, he is covered head to toe in bandages. Gerry seems to have a decent sense of both morals and safety standards but is usually overruled by a determined Damien.
- Deborah Dent (Louisa Milwood-Haigh) – George's daughter, and one of the main problems at home. A juvenile delinquent, Deborah frequently runs away from home, steals cars and other vehicles (including a fully laden car transporter and an InterCity 125), sells drugs (George's prescription medication), sets fire to supply teachers, and attacks her school classmates with a pickaxe handle. She once attempted to sue her school for failing to provide her with an education – having previously burned the school buildings down, and on one occasion is mentioned as having found her way to a Middle East guerrilla training camp. She expresses love (as well as pity) for her father, and they bond in one episode over getting revenge on Damien by taking a hammer to his Porsche.
- Chloe Cooper (Jocelyn Barker) – Helen's self-obsessed and attention-seeking daughter in several episodes. Helen, who worries constantly over the time she spends at work and away from her daughter, agonises over Chloe's upbringing and doubts her own abilities as a mother. She is particularly alarmed when she discovers that Chloe has written a school essay entitled "The Invisible Mummy". Chloe eventually admits, however, that she is entirely happy with arrangements at home and wrote the essay merely in an attempt to gain sympathy from a new teacher.
- Alfred and Bernice Cooper (Geoffrey Hutchings & Paula Jacobs) – Helen's supposedly conservative parents, from whom she spends years concealing her lesbianism – even going to the extent of persuading Dave to impersonate her boyfriend while they visited for an evening. In Series 6, Helen has to deal with the death of one of her parents.
- Amanda (Saira Todd) – Helen's much-mentioned girlfriend in the later series. Her only on-screen appearance is in Series 5, where she arrives at the office while working as a despatch rider – a job she took to help pay for her university course, but which causes Helen some social embarrassment. The pair break up after a dinner at their house with Helen's friends from the office (Series 5, episode 5) ends in disaster, but they are later back together. In the last series, Helen's daughter mentions a time she had to make excuses for her appearing while Helen's parents were visiting, by claiming she was a Jehovah's Witness.
- Roy Merchant Jnr (David Troughton) – Sir Roysten's badly stammering, bullied, and reluctantly bullying son, sent by his father to the GlobeLink office to oversee the company's final hours. Roy, whose stammer is always at its worst when referring to Sir Roysten, reveals that he has been pitted against his siblings in a challenge: only the most ruthless will inherit the Merchant empire. Roy announces early in series 6 that GlobeLink News will close, after initially proposing to significantly cut the workforce..
- Octavia Merchant (Hermione Norris) – appeared in the Series 2 episode "The Gulf Report" as a trainee reporter who becomes a love interest of Dave's. As usual with Dave it fizzles out quickly.
- Lynn Yeats (Elizabeth Downes) – A reporter for a rival news company and Damien's nemesis. Lynn invariably arrives at disaster sites and warzones before Damien; she gets bigger and better stories; wins awards and generally manages to achieve everything Damien fails to achieve. Although Damien usually attributes her success to her greater resources and financial support, Lynn is simply more ruthless and unethical even than Damien himself. Damien also makes references to his bitterness towards real-life reporters such as Kate Adie.
- Anna (Nina Marc) – A short-term love interest of George's, Anna is a Polish migrant seeking marriage to obtain a British passport and stay in the country. George, however, is convinced that she is the love of his life, though the rest of the staff tries to persuade him of her true intentions. In an attempt to save George, Dave makes a move on Anna with disastrous results. Rawle and Marc are married in real life.
- Sir Gordon Miller (Melvyn Hayes) – When GlobeLink News is axed in Series 6, Sally starts to plunder the Sunday Times Rich List as her final career move. Eventually, she teams up with the miserly and dispassionate Sir Gordon, the 34th richest man in the world. The physically diminutive Sir Gordon is probably the most fleshed-out of the several recurring characters in the short Series 6. He is the epitome of a controlling husband, with a pre-nuptial agreement designed to iron out absolutely every future disagreement or opinion.
- Sue (Victoria Carling) – Sue is Henry's niece, with whom George develops a promising relationship in the final episodes of Series 6. She is kind, compassionate, calm and gentle: the polar opposite of George's highly emotional and manipulative ex-wife Margaret. Like George, Sue is an escapee from an unhappy marriage. Although George – due to his natural pessimism and lack of confidence – has to be prompted and encouraged every step of the way, their relationship blossoms, and they plan a new life together in Australia.
- Wes Jasper (Neil Stuke) – Wes Jasper is a thinly disguised parody of Chris Evans, hosting what is clearly a very thinly disguised parody of TFI Friday, with an identical set, and the same "ridicule-the-punter" features. In an attempt to forge a post-GlobeLink career for himself in Series 6, Henry makes several appearances on this show as a sidekick for Wes. Dave Charnley is appalled and disappointed by his distinguished friend's fall in standards.
- Jenny (Sara Stewart) – Joy's more easy-going predecessor as PA who appears several times in the first series. Her main contribution is to join Dave, Henry and Henry's great-nephew Jack on a night out and then apparently sleep with Jack – to the bemusement of Dave and Henry who have both failed to get anywhere with her, and Sally, who clearly fancied Jack. In a classic single-entendre, Sally snaps at Jenny, who asks "What's got into her?", to which Dave replies, "I think it's what's got into you that's got into her."

== Scripting ==
Unusually for a sitcom, the show was topical, and was usually written and filmed in the week before broadcast. The writers commented that this made for a very natural style of acting. In most offices, people normally converse while looking at monitors, clipboards or newspaper crosswords; the cast of the show reproduced this while actually cribbing their lines. The character plots for each episode were written in advance, and delivered to the cast on the Monday before recording. The scripts would then be re-written to add in topical references over the next few days. Typically, the last scene was filmed either the day before or sometimes on the day of broadcast, and episodes concluded with audio-only dialogue or (in later series) an additional scene during the credits, which would usually involve topical references. The most frantic rewrite is said to have occurred when, on the day of filming, British media mogul Robert Maxwell drowned. (As the writers said in a later episode, "We don't want to go overboard with the story.") A number of politicians including Neil Kinnock and Ken Livingstone made guest appearances.

The humour, like that in a real newsroom, was often very black, as the writers did not shy away from sensitive subjects. A typical line (from Henry): "The 'Troubles' in Northern Ireland. What a bloody stupid phrase. What do they think two thousand people have died from? Stress?" The view of relationships in the programme is also very bleak: all the main characters have very unstable romantic lives, with no-one being happily married.

The series ended with GlobeLink being closed down, with Series 6 being spent with the main characters trying to plan their futures elsewhere (largely unsuccessfully). The format for the final series differed slightly from the previous five. As well as being shorter (seven episodes), far less emphasis was placed on the news than before (both in terms of topical references and stories covered in the newsroom). Instead, much of the focus was on where the main characters would be once GlobeLink closed, after an announcement in the second episode of the series. Several minor characters appeared over the course of a few episodes in the final series, whereas most previously had only been in single episodes.

The ending contradicted the novel Drop the Dead Donkey 2000 by Hamilton and Alistair Beaton (1994) ISBN 0-316-91236-0, in which the company is almost destroyed in a bomb blast at the turn of the millennium.

== Episodes ==
Drop the Dead Donkey started with an un-broadcast 1989 pilot episode. The first series started airing in August 1990, and the programme continued until the end of the sixth series in December 1998.

Including the pilot, 66 episodes were produced.

== Home media ==
Five compilation videos, each featuring three selected episodes of Drop the Dead Donkey, were released during the 1990s. There was also a sixth, called "The Writer's Choice", which featured six episodes plus 50 classic moments chosen by the writers Andy Hamilton and Guy Jenkin.

Volume 1

- The Gulf Report (Series 2 Episode 1)
- George's Daughter (Series 2 Episode 11)
- The Christmas Party (Series 2 Episode 13)

Volume 2

- Paintball (Series 3 Episode 9)
- George and His Daughter (Series 3 Episode 10)
- Awards (Series 3 Episode 11)

Volume 3

- A New Dawn (Series 1 Episode 1)
- Sally's Arrival (Series 1 Episode 2)
- A Clash of Interests (Series 1 Episode 3)

Volume 4

- In Place of Alex (Series 3 Episode 1)
- Sally's Accountant (Series 3 Episode 2)
- Sally's Libel (Series 3 Episode 5)

Volume 5

- Henry's True Love (Series 3 Episode 3)
- Sir Roysten's Wife (Series 3 Episode 6)
- The New Newsreader (Series 3 Episode 7)

Volume 6 – "The Writer's Choice"

- Sally's Viking (Series 1 Episode 6)
- Baseball (Series 2 Episode 4)
- Gus and the Grim Reaper (Series 4 Episode 1)
- Helen's Fake Boyfriend (Series 4 Episode 5)
- Damien's Virus (Series 6 Episode 5)
- The Final Chapter (Series 6 Episode 7)

Between 2005 and 2007 VCI (UK, now part of 2 Entertain) released all six series on DVD, via their Cinema Club label. They were also collected into two box sets, featuring three series apiece. Extra features included the unaired pilot, and introductions and interviews with Andy Hamilton, Guy Jenkin and the cast. In 2015, all six series were re-released in a "Complete Series" box set by Spirit Entertainment.

== Repeats ==
Repeats of the programme often appeared on Comedy Central Extra. Before the show starts, there is often a short review of the major news events which happened during the week of each episode's filming. Episodes on DVD compilations are introduced in the same way (although not for Series 6 when topical references were very limited).

All series are now available via Channel 4's All 4 service and the UK streaming service BritBox.

All episodes are available in the US on the online streaming service Acorn TV starting in December 2014.

As of April 2024, it is available in the US on the streaming service TUBI.

== 2024 stage version ==
In May 2023, it was announced that a stage version, written by Hamilton and Jenkin and reuniting the surviving members of the main cast, would tour the UK in 2024.

Entitled Drop the Dead Donkey: The Reawakening!, the new production is directed by Derek Bond and produced by Hat Trick Productions and Simon Friend Entertainment. The tour began at Richmond Theatre in January 2024, and will return there for a second run in June 2024 after performances around the country. As well as Susannah Doyle, Robert Duncan, Ingrid Lacey, Neil Pearson, Jeff Rawle, Stephen Tompkinson and Victoria Wicks, the show features Julia Hills and Kerena Jagpal.

== Swedish version ==
Swedish comedian Kryddan Petersson, producer of the Swedish show Helt Apropå, has said that he and his colleagues had come up with an idea for a show like this, which they presented to British colleagues some time around 1989–1990. He has asserted that, although most of them were not impressed, two of them took the idea seriously and wrote this show. Later, the Swedish group brought the material rights to the show back to Sweden, and created the show Döda danskar räknas inte ("Dead Danes don't count"), which aired on SVT in 1994.

== See also ==
- Ballot Monkeys (2015) – similar topical satirical sitcom by the same writers set around the 2015 UK election
- Power Monkeys (2016) – similar topical satirical sitcom by the same writers set in 2016
- The Day Today – sketch show satirising news programmes
- Broken News – satire on 24-hour rolling news.
- NewsRadio – US sitcom set in a news radio station, though neither satirical nor topical
- Frontline – Australian satire of current-affairs news often compared to Drop the Dead Donkey
- Spitting Image – satirical puppet show satirising major public figures.
- Murphy Brown – US sitcom with a similar premise.
- Hot Metal – LWT sitcom satirising printed media.
- The Newsroom – Canadian comedy/drama with a similar premise.
- KYTV – satire on the emerging satellite channels programming in the UK

== Notes ==
1. Drop The Dead Donkey—The Writers Choice (DVD). London, UK: Hat Trick International. 1999. 5-014138-068608. Archived from the original on 4 March 2016.
2. Passmore, John (6 December 1991). "Travails with a Donkey". London Evening Standard. Internet Archive Wayback Machine. Archived from the original on 4 February 2003.
3. Bond, Matthew (24 October 1998). "Old faces bid a short but sweet farewell". The Daily Telegraph. Archived from the original on 4 February 2003.
