= The Ranganation =

British TV topical comedy (BBC Two, 2019–2022)

- Genre: Comedy
- Directed by: Barbara Wiltshire
- Presented by: Romesh Ranganathan
- Starring: Shanthi Ranganathan
- Opening theme: "No CD" by Loyle Carner
- Country of origin: United Kingdom
- Original language: English
- No. of series: 5
- No. of episodes: 22

Production
- Producers: Mark Barrett; Mia Cross; Monica Long
- Production locations: Television Centre, London (2019); BBC Elstree Centre (2019); Pinewood Studios (2021–22)
- Running time: 45 minutes
- Production company: Zeppotron

Original release
- Network: BBC Two
- Release: 19 May 2019 – 6 November 2022

The Ranganation is a British comedy show hosted by Romesh Ranganathan and broadcast on BBC Two. Ranganathan joins a group of 25 members of the public, including his mother, to discuss news events of the week. Two celebrity guests are also featured. The first series of six 45-minute episodes premiered on 19 May 2019. The second series of six episodes was filmed remotely due to the COVID-19 pandemic and first aired on 10 May 2020.

== Production ==
A pilot was filmed on 20 May 2018, produced by Zeppotron. The first series was commissioned in August 2018. It consisted of six weekly 45-minute episodes, beginning on 19 May 2019 and ending on 23 June 2019.

Ranganathan said that he wanted the programme to be a "topical show, not a political show". He said that the casting focused on recruiting a diverse group of "regular people who are opinionated and passionate", and that he enjoyed the honesty of the panellists. Asked who his ideal guest would be in 2018, Ranganathan said it would be Justin Trudeau if he was British, or Idris Elba. When asked again in 2020, he suggested Patrick Stewart.

The second series of six episodes aired in May 2020, during the COVID-19 pandemic. It was one of several topical British shows to be filmed and hosted by each participant remotely from their home, along with Have I Got News for You, The Mash Report and The Last Leg. Ranganathan filmed in his garage, requiring him to remove DJ equipment he bought to learn how to disc jockey during the pandemic. On Sunday, 10 May 2020 at 9:15 p.m., the first episode aired. The production aimed to incorporate a mixture of topics, despite homogeneous pandemic news coverage.

On 18 January 2021, the BBC Press office announced the third series of The Ranganation would return that February. While Ranganathan was filmed from a studio, the guests participated from home. A fourth series began in October 2021. Following the relaxation of social distancing guidelines in the summer, Ranganathan and celebrity guests record in the studio while members still contribute remotely.

== Awards and nominations ==
Award	Date of ceremony	Category	Nominee	Result
British Academy Television Awards	31 July 2020	Best Comedy Entertainment Programme	The Ranganation	Nominated
Royal Television Society Programme Awards	16 March 2021	Comedy Entertainment	The Ranganation	Won
Broadcast Awards	27 May 2021	Best Lockdown Programme: Entertainment, Comedy and Scripted	The Ranganation	Won
British Academy Television Awards	6 June 2021	Best Comedy Entertainment Programme	The Ranganation	Nominated
British Academy Television Awards	6 June 2021	Best Entertainment Performance	Romesh Ranganathan	Won

== Episodes ==
=== Series 1 ===
No. overall	No. in series	Guests	Original release date	UK viewers (millions)
1	1	Rob Beckett and Fay Ripley	19 May 2019	1.49
2	2	Natasia Demetriou and Katherine Ryan	26 May 2019	1.19
3	3	Jessica Hynes and Jon Richardson	2 June 2019	1.01
4	4	Tom Davis and Sara Pascoe	9 June 2019	N/A (< 1.15) (Note: Not reported in the weekly top 15 programmes for BBC Two)
5	5	Kerry Godliman and Richard Osman	16 June 2019	1.29
6	6	Angela Scanlon and Tom Allen	23 June 2019	1.25

=== Series 2 ===
No. overall	No. in series	Guests	Original release date	UK viewers (millions)
7	1	Danny Dyer and Katherine Ryan	10 May 2020	TBA
8	2	Jon Richardson and Scarlett Moffatt	17 May 2020	TBA
9	3	Rob Beckett and Jo Brand	24 May 2020	TBA
10	4	Jason Manford and Aisling Bea	31 May 2020	TBA
11	5	Tom Allen and Paloma Faith	7 June 2020	TBA
12	6	Andrew Flintoff and Sara Pascoe	14 June 2020	TBA

=== Series 3 ===
No. overall	No. in series	Guests	Original release date	UK viewers (millions)
13	1	Jack Dee and Alex Jones	7 February 2021	TBA
14	2	Katherine Ryan and Mo Gilligan	14 February 2021	TBA
15	3	Nish Kumar and Rosie Jones	21 February 2021	TBA
16	4	Judi Love and Joe Lycett	28 February 2021	TBA
17	5	Jamie Laing and Roisin Conaty	7 March 2021	TBA
18	6	Richard Madeley and Maisie Adam	14 March 2021	TBA

=== Series 4 ===
No. overall	No. in series	Guests	Original release date	UK viewers (millions)
19	1	Jack Dee and Hannah Waddingham	3 October 2021	TBA
20	2	Jon Richardson and Nadiya Hussain	10 October 2021	TBA
21	3	Roisin Conaty and Guz Khan	17 October 2021	TBA
22	4	Richard Osman and Harriet Kemsley	24 October 2021	TBA
23	5	Jo Brand and Ranj Singh	31 October 2021	TBA
24	6	Scarlett Moffatt and Josh Widdicombe (Christmas Special)	19 December 2021	TBA

=== Series 5 ===
No. overall	No. in series	Guests	Original release date	UK viewers (millions)
25	1	Alex Brooker and Anna Maxwell Martin	1 October 2022	TBA
26	2	James Acaster and Lady Leshurr	9 October 2022	TBA
27	3	Jack Dee and Sophie Willan	16 October 2022	TBA
28	4	Sara Pascoe and Big Zuu	23 October 2022	TBA
29	5	Lucy Beaumont and Stephen Mangan	30 October 2022	TBA
30	6	Oti Mabuse and Jo Brand	6 November 2022	TBA

== Topics ==
The first series included a wide variety of discussions including:

- Episode 1: Do you wash your legs in the shower?
- Episode 2: Should plastic straws be banned?
- Episode 3: Should homework be banned?
- Episode 4: Do you believe in UFOs?
- Episode 5: The staggering number of UK adults sleeping with a soft toy
- Episode 6: Trying to answer stupid job interview questions

== Series members ==
Each series of The Ranganation includes a diverse cross-section of the public with each member having a unique nickname. Some notable participants include Romesh's mum, Scott Caizley under the nickname OMG PHD, Param Singh who is Wheeler Dealer, Anglia TV announcer Katie Glass who is You're History, and Anthony Nguyen, the Ranganation's first ever Drag Queen, Tequila Thirst, with the moniker Life's A Drag, who opened for Chappell Roan on tour.

=== Series 1 ===
In the first series, 29 people appeared on the show: Vlogger, Vicars Daughter, Privileged, Yes Miss, Football Mad, OMG PHD, Lord Dave, Selfie Queen, EcoVegan, Wannabe MP, Mindful, Oxbridge, Dog Father, Technophobe, Table for One, Small Town Girl, Ex Banker, Gen Z, Wheeler Dealer, The Skipper, Single Dad, You're History, Witness the Fitness, Romesh's Mum, Never Voted, Granny To Be, Pride of Wales, Comic Book Guy, and Green Fingers.

=== Series 2 ===
Series two included 25 members from the public: Romesh's mum, Old Bill, Craft Beard, Privileged, You're History, Never Voted, Lord Dave, Small Town Girl, Pride of Wales, Ex Banker, Mani-Pedi, Vlogger, Glam Gran, Wheeler Dealer, Technophobe, Metalhead, Old Bill, Green Fingers, Gen Z, Football Mad, Watch Your Language, Wine Buff, The Dogfather, Oxbridge, The Skipper, and Comic Book Guy.

=== Series 3 ===
The third series included 20 members from the public including Romesh's mum, Old Bill, The Dogfather, You're History, Never Voted, Lord Dave, Small Town Girl, Ex Banker, Pride of Wales, Oxbridge, Country Life (New Member), Vlogger, Wheeler Dealer, Technophobe, Gen Z, Picture This, Football Mad, Watch Your Language, The Skipper, Comic Book Guy, Metalhead, Glam Gran, and Folk Hero.

The display screen also changed to show the current speaker in the centre with the other people appearing around them. The central talking member still appears in the smaller windows around them.

=== Series 4 ===
The Ranganation series 4 has included 22 members from the public including Romesh's mum, Old Bill, Vlogger, You're History, The Dogfather, Never Voted, Lord Dave, Small Town Girl, Pride of Wales, Folk Hero, Technophobe, Wheeler Dealer, Country Life, Renaissance Man, Oxbridge, Chippy Tea, Ex Banker, Glam Gran, Football Mad, Metalhead, Watch Your Language, Comic Book Guy, Flying Circus, and Gen Z.

=== Series 5 ===
The Ranganation Series 5 included 2 new members Life's A Drag, and Bingo, from the public, joining the existing cast.

The show continued to have a large display screen in the studio of the cast - alongside Romesh and special studio guests.
