= King Alfred School, London =

The King Alfred School

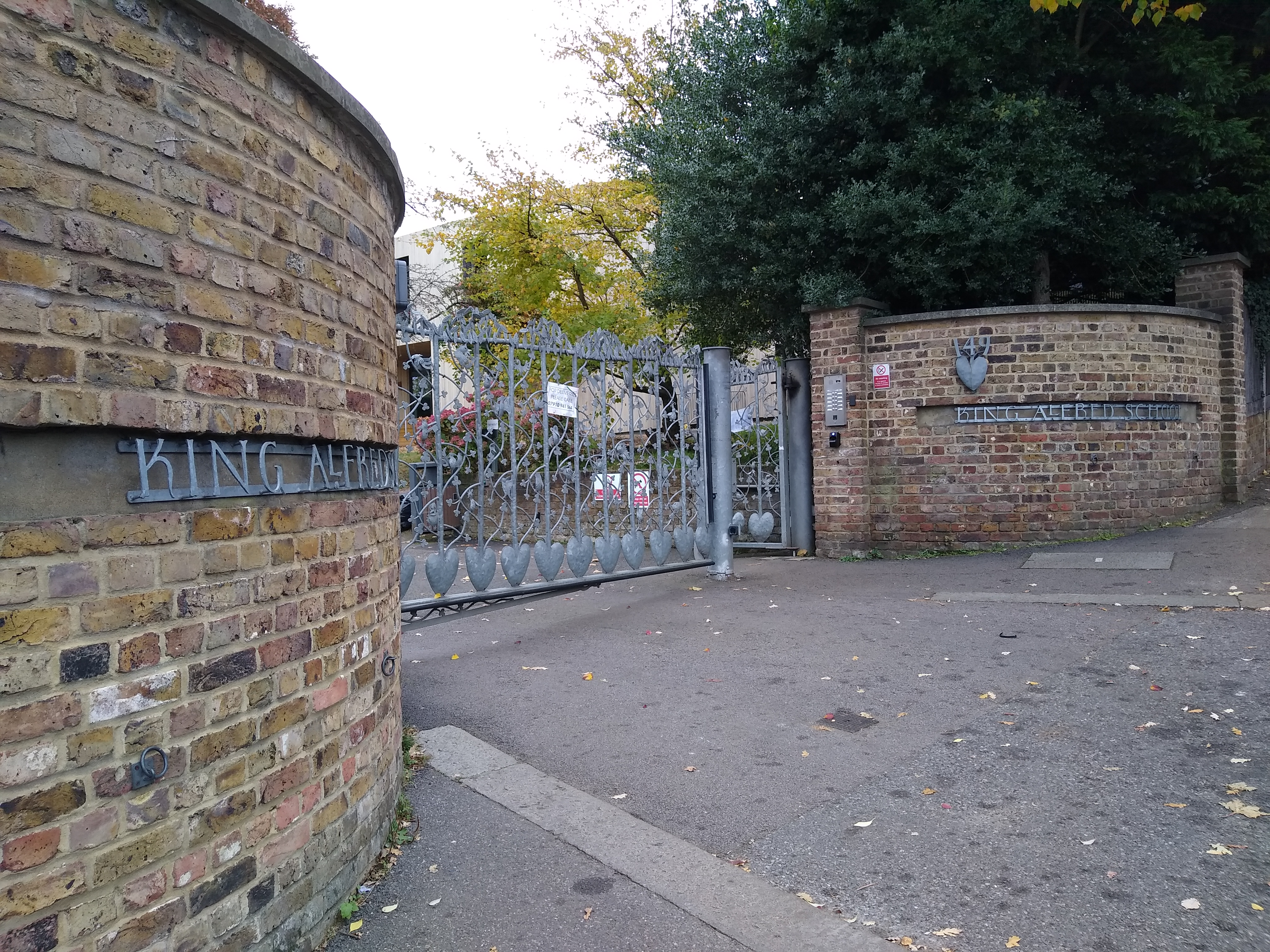

Location
- Manor Wood; North End Road, London, NW11 7HY; England; 51.5693°N 0.1844°W

Information
- Type: Independent School
- Motto: Ex corde vita ("From the heart springs life")
- Religious affiliation: None
- Established: 1898; 128 years ago
- Chair: Annabel Cody
- Headmaster: Stephen Campbell
- Staff: 200
- Gender: Co-educational
- Age: 4 to 18
- Enrolment: About 700
- Alumni: Old Alfredians
- Website: http://www.kingalfred.org.uk/

The King Alfred School is an independent co-educational day school for ages 4 to 18 in North West London, on the edge of Hampstead Heath. It was founded in London in 1898 by a group of parents who sought to create an excellent education focussing on the whole child, and who wanted the school to make a positive impact on the world. The first Head Teacher was Charles E. Rice, a former teacher at Bedales School. The school was considered "radical" for its era, as it provided a secular education in a co-educational setting.

== Notable former pupils ==
- Ian Aitken, journalist and political commentator
- Pegaret Anthony, artist and lecturer
- Nora Beloff, journalist
- Richard Clements, journalist and political adviser
- Nina Conti, actress, ventriloquist and comedian
- A. G. Cook, musician and founder of the web label PC Music
- Harold Scott MacDonald Coxeter, geometer
- Richard Gregory, experimental psychologist
- J. B. Gunn, physicist
- Danny L Harle, producer/composer
- Dylan Howe, musician and composer
- Lucy Jones, artist
- Finn Keane, songwriter
- Alexis Korner, pop musician
- Paul Kossoff, pop musician
- Danny Kustow, pop musician
- Chloe Madeley, television host, journalist and ice skater
- Juliet Mitchell, psychologist
- Heydon Prowse, actor and activist
- Jonathan Rietti, rabbi
- Gaby Roslin, television presenter
- Jolyon Rubinstein, actor and activist
- Polly-Louisa Salmon, singer
- Raphael Samuel, historian
- Peggy van Praagh, ballet dancer, teacher and director
- Zoë Wanamaker, actor
- Bonnie Wright, actress
- Emily Young, sculptor

== Bibliography ==
- "King Alfred School, London". AIM25: Archives in London and the M25 area. August 2003.
