= Richard Rubinstein =

Major Richard Arthur Rubinstein MC TD (29 August 1921 – 23 February 2005) was a British Army officer who earned the Military Cross and the Croix de Guerre for organising guerrilla resistance in France and Burma.

== Personal life ==
Rubinstein was born in Baker Street, London, the son of Florris (Newport) and Arthur Bernard Rubinstein, who was from Birmingham. His father was born to a Jewish family and his mother converted to Judaism. His father, a milliner, sent him to Hampstead's University College School. Already in the Territorial Army from the age of 16, he enlisted in the Royal Engineers as the war broke out. In 1941 he was commissioned into the Royal Artillery as a searchlight officer. After converting from Judaism to the Church of England, he married his wife Gay Garnsey, with whom he had been friends since their childhood, in 1943. Shortly after the wedding he volunteered for the Special Operations Executive, and began training in Peterborough before his first mission to France. Rubinstein was the grandfather of comedian Jolyon Rubinstein.

== Career ==
He led the Special Operations Executive Jedburgh team that was parachuted safely, despite ground fire, into Brittany on the night of 6 August 1944, bearing five million francs for the French Resistance.

The following weeks were spent with the SAS and the Forces Français de L'Interieur helping to land gliders loaded with arms and hiding in an oyster farm between operations. The mission was a success, and resulted in most of the region being cleared of German forces by the end of the month.

The Jeds returned to France on 15 September parachuting into eastern France close to the Swiss border, there to gather intelligence on enemy movements and to help repel the German troops.

He was mentioned in dispatches, and awarded the Croix de Guerre.

In December 1944, he and two colleagues were parachuted into northern Burma to gather intelligence on Japanese supply lines and to stoke the resistance movement among the local Kachins, who were sympathetic to the Allied forces.

Again it would be a successful mission, with the guerilla groups organised by Rubinstein taking a heavy toll on the enemy. He had similar success in an operation in April 100 miles to the east. The 200 guerilla fighters he raised carried out ambushes on Japanese troops and captured weaponry. After two months, he led his team south to Toungoo to join forces holding back the Japanese advance on Siam.

After the war, in which he reached the rank of Major, Rubinstein stayed in the Territorial Army, transferring to the Parachute Regiment in 1950.
