= Jolyon Rubinstein =

British actor, writer, producer and director

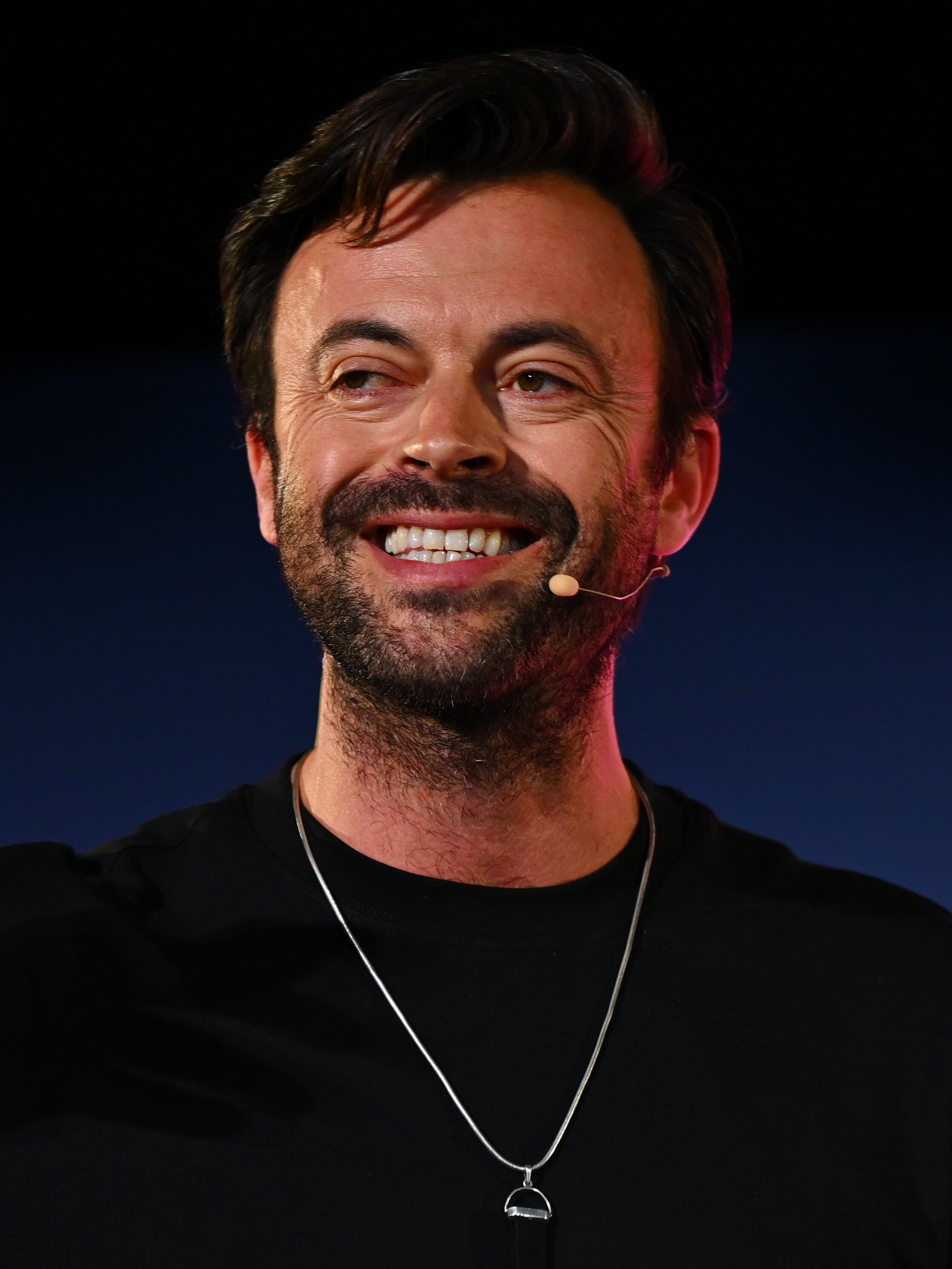
- Rubinstein in 2024
- Born: 22 April 1981 (age 45); Islington, north London, England
- Occupations: Actor, director, producer, writer
- Years active: 2005–present

Jolyon Rubinstein (born 22 April 1981) is a British actor, writer, producer and director. He is best known for writing and performing on The Revolution Will Be Televised, a show on BBC Three, alongside Heydon Prowse.

== Early life ==
Rubinstein was born in Islington, London, England. He was educated at the independent King Alfred School, London, University of the Arts London, the University of Sussex and the State University of New York at Stony Brook. He graduated from the University of the Arts London with an MA in Performance and from the University of Sussex with a BA in Politics and International Relations.

His grandfather was army officer Richard Rubinstein, who earned the Military Cross and the Croix de Guerre during WWII. Jolyon's grandfather had been born to a Jewish-born father and a mother who had converted to Judaism. He later joined the Church of England when marrying Jolyon's paternal grandmother. His patrilineal Rubinstein ancestors have been born in England since at least Jolyon's great-grandfather. On his mother's side, he has Irish ancestry.

== Career ==
Rubinstein's first professional acting job was that of the PR in the TV series Nathan Barley. After producing for a number of years, Rubinstein and Heydon Prowse got together to direct and act for a number of films for Don't Panic Online. They both wrote and acted for their BBC Three television show The Revolution Will Be Televised. He also wrote for the Financial Times Business and Yahoo. His first video was 'Fishing for Bankers' for the Don't Panic website where he and Prowse put a £5 note on the pavement and pulled it away with a fishing line when a banker leant over to pick it up. In 2018, he co-created the ITV2 hip hop comedy show Don't Hate the Playaz. In 2020, Rubinstein launched the satire news show Not The News with Jolyon Rubinstein on his YouTube channel and launched the new podcast The New Conspiracist, hosted by himself and journalist James Ball.

== Personal life ==
Rubinstein has known Heydon Prowse since he was eight years old. They studied together at the University of Sussex. He is a Tottenham Hotspur fan and season ticket holder.

== Filmography ==
| Film | Year | Role | Episode |
|---|---|---|---|
| Nathan Barley | 2005 | PR | Series 1 Episode 3 |
| The Bill | 2005 | Paul Carr | Episodes 335 and 338 |
| Rabbit Fever | 2006 | Policeman | |
| The Green Fairy | 2007 | Tom | Short |
| Cries of London | 2008 | Martin | Short |
| Friends in Need Are Friends in Deed | 2008 | Warren | Short |
| The Revolution Will Be Televised | 2012 - 2014 | Various | Episodes 1 to 18 |
| An Idiot's Guide to Politics | 2015 | Presenter | |
| Brexageddon?! | 2016 | Various | BBC Two |
| Revolting | 2017 | Various | BBC Two |
| Ministry of Justice | 2018 | Various | Channel 4 |
| Not the News with Jolyon Rubinstein | 2020 | Presenter | Season 1 |
