= Kevin Caizley =

English footballer

Personal information
- Full name: Kevin Caizley
- Date of birth: 2 December 1968 (age 57)
- Place of birth: Jarrow, England
- Position: Midfielder

Senior career*
Years	Team	Apps	(Gls)
1984–1988	Newcastle United	0	(0)
1988–1989	Darlington	12	(1)
1990	North Perth Croatia		
–	Newcastle Blue Star		
–	Blyth Spartans		
–	Hebburn Town		
- * Club domestic league appearances and goals

Kevin Caizley (born 2 December 1968) was an English footballer who made 12 appearances in the Football League playing as a midfielder for Darlington. He started his football career on the books of Newcastle United signing as a schoolboy in 1984 before beginning his full-time professional career with them from 1985 to 1988. Without representing them in the football League, he represented them many times in the reserves and youth teams. He then signed for Darlington FC for the 1988–89 season. He then went on to play for North Perth Croatia, Western Australia in 1990. He went on to play non-league football for Newcastle Blue Star, Blyth Spartans and Hebburn Town. He started his academic studies at Gateshead College in 1994 before moving to the United States in 1995 to continue his studies. He continued his full-time studies from 1995 until 2001 when he graduated as a Doctor of Chiropractic in April 2001. He practiced privately until 2017, when he became a teacher at Kingwood Park High School. He has also coached competitive soccer in the US with Texas Heatwave, Eclipse, Albion Hurricanes, Kingwood Alliance and Challenge Soccer Clubs.
