= Heydon Prowse =

British activist (born 1981)

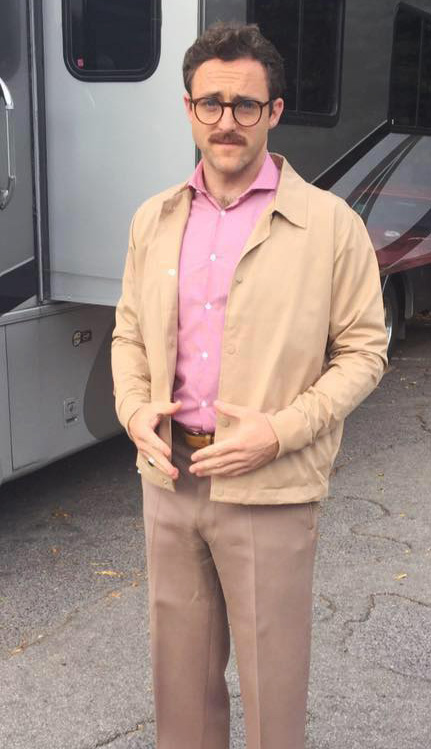
- Prowse in 2018
- Born: February 1981 (age 45); London, England
- Education: King Alfred School, London; University of Sussex

Comedy career
- Years active: 1993–present
- Medium: Stand-up, television, film, radio
- Genre: Topical comedy/satire
- Subjects: Politics, current affairs

Heydon Prowse (born February 1981) is a British activist, journalist, satirist, director and comedian. He is best known for writing and performing in BBC Three's Bafta-winning The Revolution Will Be Televised alongside Jolyon Rubinstein. As part of that show he gave George Osborne a GCSE maths text book, a stunt that featured on the front cover of The Daily Telegraph and other publications.

In May 2023, Prowse traveled to Brazil where he was ambushed alongside activist Txai Suruí in Uru-Eu-Wau-Wau.

== Early life ==
Prowse was educated at King Alfred School, London and the University of Sussex where he studied philosophy, graduating in 2004. As a schoolboy he played Colin Craven in the 1993 film The Secret Garden. Prowse made national news in the UK in 2009 when a secret recording he made of Conservative politician Alan Duncan in the Houses of Parliament resulted in Duncan's dismissal from the opposition front bench.

== Revolting ==
Heydon Prowse and Jolyon Rubinstein created and starred in Revolting on BBC2 in 2017, a short-lived satire show which garnered controversy through sketches including "The Real Housewives of ISIS".

== Don't Panic ==
Prowse is director and talent with the viral creative agency Don't Panic for whom he has created a number of award-winning films. In 2013, Prowse directed his first VICE show, presented by Nimrod Kamer at the Venice Film Festival.

== Michael Green ==
For the 2015 United Kingdom general election, Prowse changed his name to Michael Green via deed poll to stand as an independent candidate against Grant Shapps in the Welwyn Hatfield constituency. The name Michael Green is a pseudonym of Shapps which has attracted controversy. He secured 216 votes in the election, placing sixth out of seven candidates.

== Presenting ==
Prowse also acted as the presenter for the BBC documentary show The Town That Took on the Taxman shown in January 2016, where businesses in the small Welsh town Crickhowell attempted to minimise their tax burden using the same methods as large corporations.

== Prank calls ==
Prowse is known for prank calling notable figures in politics and entertainment. In February 2017, he duped Number 10 Downing Street claiming the US president wanted to send Theresa May her favourite bouquet as a special gift. In May 2017, he called Jeremy Corbyn who mistook Prowse for Stormzy and discussed making a grime video together.
