= Liddy Oldroyd =

- Born: Elizabeth Mary Oldroyd; 16 June 1955; Guildford, Surrey, England
- Died: 27 June 2002 (aged 47)
- Occupation: Television director
- Years active: 1979–2001
- Known for: Drop the Dead Donkey

Elizabeth Mary "Liddy" Oldroyd (16 June 1955 – 27 June 2002) was an English television director known for her work as the director of all 65 episodes of the situation comedy show Drop the Dead Donkey between 1990 and 1998, earning her several awards. Born in Guildford into a working-class family, her career began as a production assistant for London Weekend Television. She was the first female director of the satirical puppet programme Spitting Image.

== Early life and career ==
Elizabeth Mary Oldroyd was born on 16 June 1955 in Guildford, Surrey. She was the youngest of four children of mechanical engineer Frederick Oldroyd, who died when Liddy was eleven years old, and Elsie May, née Cooke. Oldroyd was similar in character to her father, and wanted to become a show business actress. She was educated at Guildford County School for Girls, where she was unable to pass her Latin examination but succeeded in Drama lessons. Oldroyd later attended the University of York where she succeeded in acting and singing. She created a television project on Fountains Abbey as part of her English degree which began her career in the industry.

She began as a production assistant for London Weekend Television in 1979, and worked on Game for a Laugh and later The Six O'Clock Show. Oldroyd also acted as an announcer for the BBC World Service and her career advanced when she was selected to be a trainee directorship in 1986. She married Peter Gwilliam in 1983 and the couple had three children. Oldroyd was the first woman to direct an episode of the satirical puppet programme Spitting Image. She was one of the directors of Channel 4's situation comedy and black sitcom Desmond's in 1989. Throughout the following decade Oldroyd directed other comedy programmes such as After Henry.

Oldroyd found her greatest success when she acted as director for all 65 episodes of the situation comedy show Drop the Dead Donkey between 1990 and 1998. Her work on the show earned her the 1992 Women in Film Kodak Award for Creativity, a Montreux award in the same year and other comedy accolades. Furthermore, Oldroyd also directed some children's drama programmes, Channel 4's 1997 serial Underworld, and the sitcom Gimme Gimme Gimme. She was also involved in directing the television programmes Paris, Boyz Unlimited, Look at the State We're In!, The Wilsons and Cinderella.

== Illness and death ==
Prior to signing a new contract, a routine check-up in 1999 revealed Oldroyd had an abnormally high blood pressure. Following twelve weeks of investigations, spreading of disinformation and bungled biopsies, she was diagnosed with neuroendocrine carcinoid cancer, and received a telephone call of the diagnosis on New Year's Eve. Oldroyd focused her attention on fundraising treatment, inspiring her friends and acquaintances to help her cause by taking treks to Morocco and Nepal along with organising a cycling tour across France. The cause raised £130,000. She also established the Living with Carcinoid support group to provide long-distance help for others affected by the illness. Oldroyd's work led to her being featured on The Times's 2000 Christmas appeal. She died on 27 June 2002 at the age of 47. Oldroyd was married with three children.
