= Pozzitive Television =

TV, film, and radio production company

- Company type: Production company
- Industry: Television, Film & Radio
- Genre: Comedy
- Founded: 1992
- Headquarters: 41 Goodge Street, W1T 2PY, London, United Kingdom
- Key people: Geoff Posner, David Tyler,
- Website: pozzitive.co.uk

Pozzitive Television is a production company formed by producers Geoff Posner and David Tyler in 1992. Pozzitive have won awards including six BAFTAs, two Golden Roses at Montreux, multiple British Comedy & RTS awards, seven Sony Awards and two International Emmys.

== About ==
Pozzitive Television was founded by Geoff Posner & David Tyler. Since then, Pozzitive has worked with major comic talent in the UK, including Victoria Wood, Steve Coogan, and Armando Iannucci.

Pozzitive has earned a reputation as one of the leading indie production companies in the UK - from producing the very first independent comedy ever to air on Radio 4, Jeremy Hardy Speaks to the Nation, to the recent success of Cabin Pressure, which became the first radio sitcom to be named 'Comedy of the Year' in 2014.

== Recent productions ==
=== Radio ===
- The 3rd Degree, series 1–10, 2010–2020.
- Agendum, series 1–2, 2017-2019
- British Troll Farm, pilot, 2019
- Giles Wemmbley-Hogg Goes Off... Article 50
- The Hauntening, series 1–3, 2017-2020
- Jack & Millie, series 1–2, 2017-2020
- Kevin Eldon Will See You Now, series 1–4, 2012–2019.
- Little Brexit, 2019
- Shush!, series 1–2, 2015-2017
- Thanks A Lot, Milton Jones!, series 1–4, 2014-2020
- When Jeremy Hardy Spoke To The Nation
- Glenn Moore's Almanac

== Previous productions ==
=== Radio ===
- The Cabaret Upstairs, 1985.
- The Big Fun Show, 1987.
- Dial M For Pizza, series 1 and 2, 1987–1988.
- Hey Rrradio, pilot, 1988.
- Live on Arrival, pilot, 1988.
- Radio Active, series 6 and 7, 1986–1987.
- The Woody Allen Reader, 1988.
- At Home with the Hardys (also known as Unnatural Acts), 1987–1990.
- Jeremy Hardy Speaks to the Nation, series 1–10, 1993–2014.
- Crown Jewels, series 1 & 2, 1995.
- King Stupid, 1998.
- The Very World of Milton Jones, series 1–3, 1998–2001.
- The 99p Challenge, series 2–5, 2000–2004.
- Giles Wemmbley-Hogg Goes Off, series 1–5, 2002-2019
- The House of Milton Jones, 2003.
- Another Case of Milton Jones, series 1–5, 2005–2011.
- Armando Iannucci's Charm Offensive, series 1–4, 2005–2008.
- Deep Trouble, series 1 & 2, 2005–2007.
- The Castle, series 1–4, 2007–2012.
- Cabin Pressure, series 1–4, 2008–2013.
- The Genuine Particle, 2008.
- Bigipedia, series 1 & 2, 2009–2011.
- Jo Caulfield Won't Shut Up, 2009.
- My First Planet, series 1–2, 2012–2014.
- Strap In - It's Clever Peter!, series 1, 2012.
- The Lentil Sorters - series 1, 2015
- The Brig Society, series 1–4, 2013-2016
- John Finnemore's Double Acts, series 1–2, 2015 - 2017

=== Television ===
- John Sessions's Tall Tales, 1991
- The Doug Anthony All Stars, 1992
- Introducing Tony Ferrino - Who? And Why? - A Quest, 1993
- The Tony Ferrino Phenomenon, 1993.
- The Imaginatively Titled Punt & Dennis Show, 1994.
- Pauline Calf's Wedding Video - "Three Fights, Two Weddings & A Funeral", 1994.
- The Marriage of Figaro, 1994
- Paul Calf's Video Diary, 1994.
- Coogan's Run, 1995.
- The Big Snog, 1995
- Lights, Camera, Magic, 1995
- Cows, 1997.
- Harry Enfield and Christmas Chums, 1997
- Dinnerladies, series 1 & 2, 1998–2000.
- Stephen Fry's 'Live From The Lighthouse', 1998.
- TLC, 2001.
- Gash, 2003.
- The Strategic Humour Initiative, 2003.
- The Comic Side of 7 Days, series 1 & 2, 2004–5.
- Little Miss Jocelyn, 2006
- Giles Wemmbley Hogg Goes Off... To Glastonbury, 2007.
- Music Hall Meltdown, 2007.
- Saturday Live Again!, 2007.
- One Night Only, 2008.

== Notable awards ==
=== The 3rd Degree ===
- Rose D'or Radio Game Show - Winner (2015)

=== The 99p Challenge ===
- Sony Award Silver - Winner (2004)

=== Agendum ===
- BBC Audio Drama Awards, Best Scripted Comedy - Nominee (2018)

=== Another Case of Milton Jones ===
- Chortle Awards, Best Use of Stand Up on TV or Radio - Nominee (2009)
- British Comedy Awards, Best British Radio Sitcom - Winner (2010)
- British Comedy Awards, Best British Radio Sitcom - Nominee (2011)
- Sony Award Silver - Winner (2011)
- Writers Guild Award - Nominee (2012)

=== Armando Iannucci's Charm Offensive ===
- Sony Award Bronze - Winner (2006)

=== The Brig Society ===
- New York International Radio Programme Awards - Best Regularly Scheduled Comedy programme - Finalist (2014)
- Writers' Guild Award - Winner (2014)
- BBC Audio Drama Awards - Best Scripted Comedy (Live Audience) - Nominee (2015)
- New York International Radio Programme Awards - Best Regularly Scheduled Comedy programme - Silver Award Winner (2015)
- New York International Radio Programme Awards - Best Regularly Scheduled Comedy programme - Finalist (2016)
- BBC Audio Drama Awards - Best Scripted Comedy - Nominee (2017)

=== Cabin Pressure ===
- Writers' Guild Award - Nominee (2009)
- Writer's Guild Award - Nominee (2010)
- Writer's Guild Award - Winner (2011)
- BBC Audio Drama Award - Best Scripted Comedy Drama - Nominee (2011)
- British Comedy Awards - Best British Radio Sitcom - Winner (2011)
- Broadcasting Press Guild Awards - Best Radio Show - Nominee (2012)
- British Comedy Awards - Best British Radio Sitcom - Winner (2013)
- BBC Audio Drama Award - Best Scripted Comedy Drama - Nominee (2014)
- BBC Audio Drama Award - Best Scripted Comedy (Studio Audience) - Nominee (2014)
- New York International Radio Programme Awards - Best Regularly Scheduled Comedy programme - Bronze Award Winner (2014)
- British Comedy Awards - Best British Radio Sitcom - Winner (2014)
- British Comedy Awards - Comedy Of The Year - Winner (2014)
- New York International Radio Programme Awards - Best Regularly Scheduled Comedy programme - Gold Award Winner (2015)
- BBC Audio Drama Award - Best Scripted Comedy Drama - Nominee (2015)
- BBC Audio Drama Award - Best Actor in an Audio Drama - Roger Allam - Nominee (2015)

=== Crown Jewels ===
- Sony Award Bronze - Winner (1996)

=== Giles Wemmbley Hogg Geht Zum FussballWeltmeisterschaft Weg ===
- Sony Award Silver - Winner (2006)

=== Giles Wemmbley Hogg Goes Off "Article 50" ===
- BBC Audio Drama Awards - Best Scripted Comedy - Nominee (2020)

=== The Hauntening ===
- Writers Guild Awards - Best Radio Comedy - Nominee (2020)

=== Jeremy Hardy Feels It ===
- New York International Radio Programme Awards - Best Regularly Scheduled Comedy programme - Finalist (2018)

=== Jeremy Hardy Speaks to the Nation ===
- Sony Award Bronze - Winner (1995)
- Writers' Guild Award - Nominee (1995)
- Sony Award - Nominee (2004)
- Rose D'Or Radio Comedy Award - Nominee (2014)

=== John Finnemore's Double Acts ===
- BBC Audio Drama Award - Best Scripted Comedy Drama - Nominee (2015)
- British Comedy Awards - Best British Radio Sitcom - Winner (2015)
- Writers Guild Award - Winner (2016)
- ARIAS Best Fictional Storytelling - Nominee (2017)
- Writers' Guild Award - Nominee (2017)
- BBC Audio Drama Award - Best Scripted Comedy - Nominee (2017)
- BBC Audio Drama Award - Best Actress - Nominee, Julia McKenzie (2017)
- Tinniswood Award for Best Audio Drama Script - Special Commendation (2018)

=== Kevin Eldon Will See You Now ===
- Rose D'Or Radio Comedy - Nominee (2015)
- Writers' Guild Award - Nominee (2017)
- New York International Radio Programme Awards - Best Regularly Scheduled Comedy programme - Finalist (2018)
- BBC Audio Drama Awards - Best Scripted Comedy - Finalist (2020)

=== Radio Production Awards ===
- Best Entertainment Producer - David Tyler - Nominee (2010)
- Best Entertainment Producer - David Tyler - Nominee (2011)
- Best Entertainment Producer - David Tyler - Winner (2013)
- Best Comedy/Entertainment Producer - David Tyler Nominee (2014)
- Best Comedy/Entertainment Producer - David Tyler - Winner (2015)
- Special GOLD Award - David Tyler - Winner (2015)
- Best Comedy Producer - David Tyler Winner (Bronze, 2017)
- Gethin Thomas Award for Best Comedy Producer - David Tyler - Nominee (2018)

=== Shush! ===
- New York International Radio Programme Awards - Best Regularly Scheduled Comedy programme - Bronze Award Winner (2016)

=== Thanks A Lot, Milton Jones! ===
- New York International Radio Programme Awards - Best Regularly Scheduled Comedy programme - Finalist (2014)
- New York International Radio Programme Awards - Best Regularly Scheduled Comedy programme - Silver Award Winner (2016)
- BBC Audio Drama Awards - Best Scripted Comedy (Sketch Show) - Nominee (2018)

=== The Very World of Milton Jones ===
- British Comedy Award - Best Radio Comedy - Nominee (1998)
- Sony Award Bronze - Winner (2008)
