= Carrie Quinlan =

British actress

- Born: November 19, 1975 (age 50) [London, England]
- Education: University of Bristol; Guildhall School of Music and Drama
- Occupations: Actress, comedy writer
- Years active: 1998–present
- Notable work: John Finnemore's Souvenir Programme Agendum EastEnders The News Quiz

Carrie Quinlan is a British and Irish actress and comedy writer, known for her work in theatre, television and radio. She is best known for John Finnemore's Souvenir Programme, Agendum, EastEnders and Broken Veil.

== Early life ==
Quinlan grew up in South London and Oxfordshire. She is the youngest of four children of Mary (née Finlay), a nurse and Michael Quinlan, a civil servant. Quinlan attended Nonsuch High School in Surrey and Cherwell School in Oxford, before studying history at Bristol University, where she performed with Danny Robins, Marcus Brigstocke and Dan Tetsell.

== Career ==
After university, Quinlan worked as a stand-up comedian for three years, coming runner-up in both the BBC New Comedy Award and So You Think You're Funny in 1998. She then trained as an actor at the Guildhall School of Music and Drama from 2000 to 2003. While there she performed in Measure for Measure, The Trojan Women, As You Like It, Confusions and The Seagull.

Quinlan is best known for her work on radio. She has played various characters, including interviewer Patsy Straightwoman, in all nine series of John Finnemore's Souvenir Programme on Radio 4. From 2018 to 2019 she played the lead, Alexandra Palisades, in both series of Agendum on Radio 4. She has appeared in several Big Finish Doctor Who audio dramas.

Her television work includes EastEnders, Home, Miranda, New Tricks and Yonderland. In theatre she has worked extensively with Tamara Harvey.

Quinlan has also written comedy for television and radio, on shows such as Tracey Ullman's Show, That Mitchell and Webb Sound and The Late Edition. From 2006 to 2009, Quinlan became a regular panellist on The News Quiz, where she and chairman Sandi Toksvig often bantered about their respective heights. During this period she also wrote comment pieces for New Humanist, The Royal Society of Arts, The Tablet and The Guardian.

Quinlan co-hosted, with Andy Stanton, Ask the Nincompoops, a podcast for children where the two play supposedly brilliant professors of everything and answer questions from young listeners, while in fact making things up as they go along. It has been cited as one of the best podcasts for children by Huffington Post and The Guardian and was nominated for two awards at the 2020 British Podcast Awards.

She has co-hosted The Guilty Feminist, and appeared as a guest on Griefcast, Comfort Blanket, Rule of Three, Worst Foot Forward and Always There, among others.

Despite Margaret Cabourn-Smith asking more than once, Quinlan refuses to go on the podcast Crushed by Margaret Cabourn Smith, as she's too scared.

In 2022 she starred in the European Premier of The Book of Will by Lauren Gunderson, at Bolton Octagon and Shakespeare North.

In 2024 she appeared in acclaimed horror podcasts Broken Veil and Tond.

Quinlan also teaches acting at The Actor's Lounge in Canterbury.
