= Saturday Live Again! =

British television live special

Saturday Live Again! was a one-off live special of the comedy variety show Saturday Live, broadcast on 1 December 2007.

It was commissioned by Paul Jackson, the Director of Comedy and Entertainment for ITV, and the originator of Saturday Live, after realising that it had been 21 years since the show had first aired. The show was shot in the same studio as Saturday Live, with the same inflatables, and with Ben Elton among the contributors.

Hosted by Marcus Brigstocke, the show featured performances from Mitchell and Webb, Bon Jovi, Jimmy Carr, and Lee Mack, among others. The full lineup included performances from Jo Caulfield, Justin Edwards, Ben Elton, Jocelyn Jee Esien, Pete Firman, Hard Fi, The Human Slinky, Lee Mack, David Mitchell, Robert Webb, We Are Klang (Greg Davies, Steve Hall and Marek Larwood), Bon Jovi, and Myleene Klass. The show was directed by Geoff Posner for Pozzitive Television and produced by Geoff Posner and David Tyler (producer).
