= Music Hall Meltdown =

2007 British television musical

Music Hall Meltdown was a one-off musical and comedy cabaret show, which aired on 7 May 2007 as the end of BBC 4's Edwardian Season. It was recorded at the Clapham Grand and hosted by Phil Jupitus and Marcus Brigstocke, with acts including Madness, Milton Jones and Frankie Boyle.

The idea had come around when Pozzitive Television were asked by BBC4 to pitch a Music Hall idea for their upcoming Spring season. Pozzitive pitched a Music Hall style variety show, designed to bring the concept of raucous, popular cabaret entertainment into the modern age, and it was chosen to mark the end of Edwardian Season.

The full lineup included performances from Barry Jones and Stuart MacLeod, Bruce Airhead, Frankie Boyle, Jo Caulfield, Justin Edwards, George Cockerill, Harry Enfield, Madness, Milton Jones, Mr Hudson & The Library, The Puppini Sisters, Count Arthur Strong, and Greg Davies, Steve Hall and Marek Larwood as We Are Klang. The show was directed by Geoff Posner and produced by Posner and David Tyler.
