= List of Argumental episodes =

Argumental is a Dave comedy panel game television show that was first broadcast between 2008 and 2011. It was created by Ricky Kelehar, and was hosted by John Sergeant until the end of Series 3 after which Sean Lock took over for the fourth series. In each episode two teams of two panelists, a blue team and a red team, debated and argued on various topics, with the studio audience voting for who they thought put forward the best case. For the first three series the blue team was captained by Rufus Hound while the red team was captained by Marcus Brigstocke, for the fourth series the captains were Robert Webb (blue) and Seann Walsh (red).

In total 49 episodes were broadcast, 44 regular editions and five clip shows. A Comic Relief special was broadcast as part of the 24 Hour Panel People marathon with David Walliams as host, but this does not count to the official number of episodes. All 49 official episodes were first broadcast on UKTV channel Dave, with four episodes from the second series additionally being shown on BBC Two.

== Episode list ==
The coloured backgrounds denote the result of each of the shows:

– indicates the blue team (Rufus/Robert) won
– indicates the red team (Marcus/Seann) won
– indicates the game ended in a draw

=== Series 1 ===
| No. | Episode | Broadcast | Rufus' guest | Marcus' guest | Winner |
|---|---|---|---|---|---|
| 1 | 1x01 | 27 October 2008 | Dara Ó Briain | Mark Watson | Blue (3–2) |
| 2 | 1x02 | 3 November 2008 | Jimmy Carr | Ed Byrne | Blue (3–2) |
| 3 | 1x03 | 10 November 2008 | Johnny Vegas | Robin Ince | Red (3–1) |
| 4 | 1x04 | 17 November 2008 | Frankie Boyle | Phill Jupitus | Blue (3–2) |
| 5 | 1x05 | 24 November 2008 | Hugh Dennis | Richard Herring | Blue (3–2) |
| 6 | 1x06 | 1 December 2008 | Andrew Maxwell | Sue Perkins | Blue (2–2) |
| 7 | 1x07 | 8 December 2008 | Charlie Higson | Jimmy Carr | Red (2–2) |
| 8 | 1x08 | 15 December 2008 | Andy Parsons | Mark Watson | Red (3–2) |
| 9 | 1x09 | 5 January 2009 | Phill Jupitus | Frankie Boyle | Red (3–2) |
| 10 | 1x10 | 12 January 2009 | Patrick Kielty | Lucy Porter | Blue (3–1) |
| 11 | 1x11 | 19 January 2009 | Sue Perkins | Jason Byrne | Blue (4–1) |
| 12 | 1x12 | 26 January 2009 | Lucy Porter | Jarred Christmas | Red (3–2) |
| 13 | 1x13 | 2 February 2009 | Clips Show | | — |

=== Series 2 ===
| No. | Episode | Broadcast | Rufus' guest | Marcus' guest | Winner |
|---|---|---|---|---|---|
| 14 | 2x01 | 23 March 2009 | Chris Addison | Dara Ó Briain | Red (3–2) |
| 15 | 2x02 | 30 March 2009 | Mark Watson | Ardal O'Hanlon | Red (2–2) |
| 16 | 2x03 | 6 April 2009 | Jo Caulfield | Katy Brand | Red (3–2) |
| 17 | 2x04 | 20 April 2009 (Note: Delayed by a week due to the screening of Red Dwarf: Back to Earth.) | Phill Jupitus | Sean Lock | Red (3–2) |
| 18 | 2x05 | 27 April 2009 | Reginald D. Hunter | Sean Hughes | Blue (3–2) |
| 19 | 2x06 | 4 May 2009 | Frankie Boyle | Lucy Porter | Blue (3–2) |
| 20 | 2x07 | 13 October 2009 | Andrew Maxwell | Frankie Boyle | Blue (3–1) |
| 21 | 2x08 | 20 October 2009 | Sean Lock | Phill Jupitus | Blue (3–1) |
| 22 | 2x09 | 27 October 2009 | Dara Ó Briain | Will Smith | Blue (4–1) |
| 23 | 2x10 | 3 November 2009 | Simon Day | Charlie Higson | Blue (5–0) |
| 24 | 2x11 | 10 November 2009 | Rory McGrath | Sean Hughes | Blue (3–1) |
| 25 | 2x12 | 17 November 2009 | Hugh Dennis | Mark Watson | Red (3–2) |
| 26 | 2x13 | 24 November 2009 | Clips Show: Episodes 1–6 | | — |
| 27 | 2x14 | 1 December 2009 | Clips Show: Episodes 7–12 | | — |

=== Series 3 ===
| No. | Episode | Broadcast | Rufus' guest | Marcus' guest | Winner |
|---|---|---|---|---|---|
| 28 | 3x01 | 2 February 2010 | Johnny Vegas | Chris Addison | Blue (4–0) |
| 29 | 3x02 | 9 February 2010 | Sarah Millican | Jimmy Carr | Red (3–1) |
| 30 | 3x03 | 16 February 2010 | Jack Whitehall | Mark Watson | Blue (3–2) |
| 31 | 3x04 | 23 February 2010 | Stephen K. Amos | Sean Lock | Blue (3–2) |
| 32 | 3x05 | 2 March 2010 | Mark Watson | Katy Brand | Red (3–2) |
| 33 | 3x06 | 9 March 2010 | Sean Lock | Dom Joly | Blue (4–1) |
| 34 | 3x07 | 28 September 2010 | Jimmy Carr | Will Smith | Red (3–2) |
| 35 | 3x08 | 5 October 2010 | Chris Addison | Katy Brand | Red (3–2) |
| 36 | 3x09 | 12 October 2010 | Stephen K. Amos | Jack Whitehall | Red (3–2) |
| 37 | 3x10 | 19 October 2010 | Ben Miller | Sean Lock | Red (3–2) |
| 38 | 3x11 | 26 October 2010 | Richard Herring | Stephen Mangan | Red (3–2) |
| 39 | 3x12 | 2 November 2010 | Sarah Millican | Sean Lock | Red (4–1) |
| 40 | 3x13 | 9 November 2010 | Clips Show | | — |

=== Comic Relief special ===
| No. | Episode | Broadcast | Rufus' guest | Marcus' guest | Winner |
|---|---|---|---|---|---|
| — | Sp. | 5 March 2011 (Note: Special episode webcast live as part of 24 Hour Panel People. David Walliams was the host in the place of John Sergeant.) | Dara Ó Briain | Jo Brand | Tie (1–1) |

=== Series 4 ===
| No. | Episode | Broadcast | Robert's guest | Seann's guest | Winner |
|---|---|---|---|---|---|
| 41 | 4x01 | 3 November 2011 | Jimmy Carr | Russell Kane | Blue (3–1) |
| 42 | 4x02 | 10 November 2011 | Chris Ramsey | Jack Whitehall | Red (2–1) |
| 43 | 4x03 | 17 November 2011 | Andrew Maxwell | Daniel Sloss | Tie (2–2) |
| 44 | 4x04 | 24 November 2011 | Miles Jupp | Jimmy Carr | Red (3–1) |
| 45 | 4x05 | 1 December 2011 | Stephen K. Amos | Jo Brand | Blue (3–1) |
| 46 | 4x06 | 8 December 2011 | Ardal O'Hanlon | Richard Herring | Tie (2–2) |
| 47 | 4x07 | 15 December 2011 | Tim Vine | Stephen Mangan | Blue (3–1) |
| 48 | 4x08 | 22 December 2011 (Note: Christmas special) | Jason Manford | Micky Flanagan | Blue (3–0) |
| 49 | 4x09 | 5 January 2012 | Clips Show | | — |

== Scores ==
| Rufus | Robert | Marcus | Seann |
|---|---|---|---|
Series wins (0 drawn)
| 3 | | 1 | |
| 2 | 1 | 1 | 0 |
Episode wins (2 drawn)
| 22 | | 20 | |
| 18 | 4 | 18 | 2 |
