= The Lentil Sorters =

- Genre: Sitcom
- Running time: 30 minutes
- Country of origin: United Kingdom
- Language(s): English
- Home station: BBC Radio 4
- Starring: Vincent Franklin; Rebekah Staton; Kieran Hodgson; Julia Deakin
- Written by: Jack Bernhardt
- Produced by: David Tyler
- Original release: 11 November 2015
- No. of series: 1
- No. of episodes: 4
- Website: The Lentil Sorters, BBC

The Lentil Sorters is a BBC radio comedy series, written by Jack Bernhardt and starring Vincent Franklin, Rebekah Staton, Kieran Hodgson and Julia Deakin, which first aired on BBC Radio 4 in November 2015.

It is set in the Office of Local and National Statistics, and follows the day-to-day activities of the People & Places department, which is made up of:

- Graham - Head of the People & Places Department, with a passionate love for statistics and no discernible social life.
- Audrey - the department's Survey Researcher, who loves novels and hates Daniel
- Daniel - the department's Data Analyst, an ex-city capitalist
- Mrs Wilkins - the tea lady who knows where the bodies are buried

Series One started on 11 November 2015, and the series contains four episodes in total: "Standard Deviation", "Researcher Bias", "False Positives", and "Multi-Parameter Database Search".

The series was produced and directed by David Tyler at Pozzitive Television for BBC Radio 4.
