= Pauline Calf's Wedding Video =

- Also known as: Three Fights, Two Weddings and a Funeral
- Written by: Steve Coogan; Henry Normal; Patrick Marber
- Starring: Steve Coogan
- Country of origin: United Kingdom

Production
- Producers: Geoff Posner; David Tyler
- Production company: BBC

Original release
- Network: BBC Two
- Release: 29 December 1994

Related
- Coogan's Run; Paul Calf's Video Diary

Pauline Calf's Wedding Video, also known as Three Fights, Two Weddings, and a Funeral is a British comedy written by and starring Steve Coogan, which won the 1995 BAFTA TV Award for Best Comedy Series.

It was produced by Geoff Posner and David Tyler (producer) for Pozzitive Television, following the success of Paul Calf's Video Diary, which had been broadcast on New Year's Day in 1994.

== Overview ==
The main plot revolves around Mancunian bombshell Pauline Calf (played by Coogan) in the run-up to her marriage, depicting her disastrous hen night (involving a knife fight in a toilet) and her calamitous wedding day. It takes the form of a spoof video diary, recorded by Paul Calf as the follow-up to Paul Calf's Video Diary.

The cast included Patrick Marber as Pauline's fiancée, Spiros, Sandra Gough as Paul and Pauline's mum, and John Thomson as Fat Bob, and also featured John Hannah as Mark, having just finished the 1994 Richard Curtis film Four Weddings and a Funeral on which the original title of Pauline Calf's Wedding Video was based.
