= Andre Vincent =

British comedian

- Born: 2 May 1964 (age 62); Penge, England
- Notable work: Hurrah for Cancer; Mislaid Comedy Heroes
- Website: andrevincent.co.uk mislaidcomedyheroes.com

Andre Vincent (born 2 May 1964 in Penge, England) is a comedian, writer, actor and comedy historian. A situational comic, Vincent is known for his observations about health matters, including his experiences with diabetes, cancer and kidney surgery.

== Career ==
Vinvent developed an interest in acting when, as a child, he took the part of the Artful Dodger in a locally produced Oliver. He worked as an actor from the age of seven, if any show required an "urchin" "messenger" or " Winslow Boy" he was available. At the age of 18 while performing in a show that required Circus skills he learnt to juggle and unicycle. Smitten by these new accomplishments he travelled to Paris and trained as a clown, Vincent started travelling the world appearing at circus and theatre festivals as busker 'Arry Pavarotti. Following his stand-up debut in Georgia and Alabama, Vincent made appearance in other US states. The pinnacle of this period was opening for Bob Hope in Columbus, Ohio in 1992.

Thereafter, Vincent returned home to the comedy circuit of the UK. Subsequent appearances have included a Saturday night show on Channel 4, nine sell-out runs at the Edinburgh Festival Fringe, numerous radio shows, the presenter of two award-nominated television programmes, regular appearances on daytime panel games and even an appearance as himself in the children's drama Byker Grove.

Vincent began to incorporate more material about himself into his comedy routine after his diagnosis with cancer and the removal of a 7 lb. tumor from his kidney in 2002, having in earlier shows received positive audience response from earlier references to his diabetes and a knee injury. He later incorporated the material into an award winning TV show for BBC, Hurrah for Cancer.

Vincent started working with Marcus Brigstocke in 2005 on the BBC Four show The Late Edition. The first live topical show on the BBC for many years. The pair took a live version of the show to the Edinburgh Festival Fringe in 2006 and since then have performed "The Early Edition" at many of the leading UK festivals. "The Early Edition" performed its last show at the Edinburgh Festival Fringe on 25 August 2012. After 7 years of Theatres and Festivals Andre & Marcus have called time on one of the most interesting live shows ever created.

In 2007 Vincent launched a new show with fellow comic Phill Jupitus. In "Waiting For Alice", the pair play Tweedledum and Tweedledee, sitting around and contemplating their wonderland and what may lie outside.

The Winter of 2009 found Vincent re-treading the boards in his first Pantomime in 26 years, in "Robin Hood" at the Theatre Royal, Norwich. He then returned to the same theatre for 2010 to play Billy Trott in "Jack & The Beanstalk and again in 2011, this time playing Muddles Pickles in "Sleeping Beauty"; In 2012 he returns to the Theatre Royal to play Wishee Washee in "Aladdin". The pinnacle of his Pantomime work was the 2015/16 season. Playing Buttons in "Cinderella" at the Manchester Opera House with ice skating legends Torvill and Dean. The 2017/18 Pantomime season found Vincent at the Palace Theatre, Redditch this time in "Snow White" and also a first for him as he played the Dame. The 2018/19 Season had him back in a frock, this time playing Dame Trott in "Jack & the Beanstalk" at the Bridlington Spa. Continuing to frock up as Dame, the 2019/20 pantomime season found André as Dolly Doolittle in “Snow White” at Leas Cliff Hall in Folkestone.

In 2010 he could be seen in the films Believe: The Eddie Izzard Story and The People vs. George Lucas.

In 2011 Vincent created a new show for the Edinburgh Festival Fringe, PokerMen, an interesting chat show with a difference. Vincent would give 3 comics £60 but that would be their stake money in an hour game of poker, consequently one of them would walk away with £240 but within the hour would be trash-talk, shouting, jokes, arguments but was always good fun. Also this year he played Oliver Hardy in Laurel & Hardy at York Theatre Royal.

In 2012 Vincent appeared in 2 more films: No Prisoners and the highly acclaimed Scottish indie movie Electric Man.

In 2015 Vincent began teaching BA Applied Drama undergraduates in stand-up comedy at St Mary's University in SW London. This annually-recurring role has led to several alumni becoming cabaret performers. In 2020, during the UK Coronavirus lockdown, Vincent produced a stand-up teaching module for The Prince's Trust.

== Comedy History ==
In 2015, Time Out magazine asked numerous British comedians to name their top 10 comedians: only a few could name pre-1980 performers. Shocked and annoyed by this lack of recognition for past masters, Vincent created the website 'mislaidcomedyheroes.com', a guide to the old, forgotten or lost heroes of comedy which was launched in 2016.

To accompany the website, a YouTube channel of bygone comedy classics - also known as Mislaid Comedy Heroes - was created in 2017 and has led to Vincent appearing on many TV comedy history programmes to share his knowledge with viewers.

In May 2015 Vincent had the honour of being initiated into the Grand Order of Water Rats.

== TV appearances ==
TV Stand-Up

Hurrah for Cancer'(BBC3)

Big City (ITV Central)

The Orpheum Comics (CBC)

The Comedy Factory (Nederland's TV)

I Want 2 B TV (BBC3)

A Day In the Garden' (Channel 4)

Sunday Night With The Comics (Fox)

You Must Be Joking (ITV Central)

First Night (ITV)

Edinburgh Nights'(ITV)

Comedy Blue (Comedy Central)

Net.Comedy (BBC Choice)

TV panel games

What The Dickens? (Sky Arts)

All Over The Shop (BBC1)

Don't Drink the Water (Sky Travel)

Celebrity Squares (ITV-CBC-ATV)

That's Showbiz (BBC1)

Bring Me The Head of Light Entertainment (Channel 4)

TopTip Challenge (BBC1)

What's My Line (ITV Meridian)

TV documentaries

Comedy Map of Great Britain (BBC2)

The Flash Gordon Story (Sci-Fi Channel)

Comedy Greats: Pete & Dud (BBC3)

Believe: The Eddie Izzard Story (BBC1)

Silent Clowns (BBC2)

The Roots of Monty Python (BBC3)

100 Greatest Musicals (Channel 4)

Parklife-The story of South Park (Comedy Central)

TV Factual/Topical Comedy

The Late Edition (BBC4)

The 11 o'clock Show (Channel 4)

The RDA (BBC Choice)

The Show (Channel 4)

The Basement (Bravo)

TV Acting Appearances

Lee Evans TV Extravaganza

Byker Grove

Harry Hill Fruit Fancies

Bodger & Badger

The Bill

Comedy Cuts series 1 to 3
