= Observational comedy =

Form of humor based on the commonplace aspects of everyday life

Observational comedy is a form of humour based on commonplace aspects of everyday life, especially small details and shared experiences. In a typical observational routine, the comedian highlights something familiar to the audience that is rarely discussed explicitly, often framed to emphasise recognition or relatability.

== History ==
Observational comedy has roots in the Borscht Belt (the Jewish Catskills resorts) of the 1930s and 1940s. As vaudeville declined, these resorts became a major training ground for comedians, many of them Jewish, working as tummlers (all-day entertainers). They performed repeatedly for largely Jewish audiences who stayed for extended periods, refining material centered on kvetching (complaining) about everyday life—such as marriage, in-laws, food, health concerns, and the small absurdities of shared experience. This environment fostered sharper, recognition-based humor that articulated commonplace frustrations in a relatable way. Some historians describe the Borscht Belt as the birthplace of modern stand-up comedy, where physical vaudeville gags gradually gave way to more conversational and observational wit. This foundational style influenced the emergence of observational comedy in its more polished form during the 1950s.

Although observational comedy became popular in the United States in the 1950s, one author suggests that even much older jokes commented on human nature in comparable ways. Shelley Berman was one of the pioneers in the field. Other influential observational comics include David Brenner, George Carlin, and Jerry Seinfeld. A 1989 Los Angeles Times article wrote that Seinfeld is "clearly the standard of excellence in observational comedy", while Judd Apatow called Seinfeld "the greatest observational comedian who ever lived". In the United Kingdom, Irish comedian Dave Allen popularised an observational style on television in the early 1970s, and Victoria Wood further developed closely observed, class-inflected material in the 1980s.

== Analysis ==
British comedians Richard Herring and Jo Caulfield wrote in an article that observational comedy relies upon the fact that the observation is "universally familiar" but that it "won't necessarily have been consciously noted by your audience", arguing that the statements can be neither too obvious nor too obscure. Similarly, Eddie Izzard noted that a comedian's observations need to be relatable in order to be successful. Cultural commentators have noted that strong observational material clarifies "what, exactly, is the deal" with otherwise banal phenomena by drawing attention to details just below the threshold of perception.

Academic work has linked observational stand-up to sociological modes of seeing, arguing that comics' close attention to everyday life can function as informal social analysis.

== Reception and criticism ==
Critics have long noted both the appeal and limitations of observational material: its clarity and relatability can invite "recognition laughter," yet the genre is sometimes criticised when topics become overly trivial or formulaic. Media profiles of leading practitioners also frame the style as a craft of meticulous refinement rather than confessional disclosure.
