= The Hauntening (radio series) =

BBC Radio show

- Genre: Comedy
- Running time: 28 minutes
- Country of origin: United Kingdom
- Language: English
- Home station: BBC Radio 4
- Starring: Tom Neenan; Jenny Bede
- Created by: Tom Neenan
- Written by: Tom Neenan
- Directed by: David Tyler
- Produced by: David Tyler
- Original release: 11 October 2017
- No. of series: 4
- No. of episodes: 13
- Audio format: Stereophonic sound

The Hauntening is a radio sitcom written and created by Tom Neenan and directed and produced by David Tyler. It is centred around the dangerous potential of modern technology, and stars Tom Neenan and Jenny Bede.

The programme was first broadcast on BBC Radio 4 in 2017. In 2019, the second series was nominated for a Writers Guild of Great Britain award for Best Radio Comedy. In 2021, Jenny Bede was nominated for a BBC Audio Drama Award for Best Supporting Performance for playing Heidi.

== Overview ==
The Hauntening is a radio comedy series written by and starring Tom Neenan, and produced by Pozzitive Television.

== Reception ==
The Cambridge Geek wrote that "it packs a lot into the quarter hour, and you'll almost certainly enjoy it", and Exciting Stuff wrote that it was "new and fresh, and one to put on your must-listen list".

== Series overview ==
Series	Episodes	Originally released	
Series	Episodes	First released	Last released
1	2	11 October 2017	18 October 2017
2	3	17 October 2018	31 October 2018
3	4	14 October 2020	4 November 2020
4	4	5 October 2022	26 October 2022

== Episode list ==
=== Series 1 (2017) ===
No. overall	No. in series	Title	Original release date
1	1	"SoulMaits"	11 October 2017
Tom Neenan discovers what horrors lurk in our apps and gadgets. Guest Cast: Frances Barber as The App
2	2	"The Asag Chiller"	18 October 2017
Tech blogger Tom has acquired a healthy new lifestyle, a shiny new fridge and a terrifying new problem in the second of these modern horror stories. Guest Cast: Ewan Bailey as Asag.

=== Series 2 (2018) ===
No. overall	No. in series	Title	Original release date
3	1	"Hosting"	17 October 2018
Tom hosts a podcast with an unwanted guest. Guest Cast: Vincent Franklin as Dominic Caville
4	2	"Shofa"	24 October 2018
A taxi app offers some unexpected destinations. Guest Cast: Naz Osmanoglu as Amar
5	3	"Viral"	31 October 2018
Tom attracts the attention of a very persistent blogger. Guest Cast: Nicola Walker as Camilla

=== Series 3 (2020) ===
No. overall	No. in series	Title	Original release date
6	1	"Waiting"	14 October 2020
Tom gets stuck on hold. Guest Cast: Nina Sosanya as The Operator
7	2	"Calculating"	21 October 2020
Tom and Heidi have to make a horrifying decision. Guest Cast: Julian Rhind-Tutt as Dr Conroy Georgie Glen as Elicia
8	3	"Pedalling"	28 October 2020
Tom has to stay ahead of the pack. Guest Cast: Nicholas Wooderson as DI Freck
9	4	"Sleeping"	4 November 2020
Tom's sweet dreams turn sour. Guest Cast: Andy Nyman as Charlie

=== Series 4 (2022) ===
No. overall	No. in series	Title	Original release date
10	1	"Star Struck"	5 October 2022
A celebrity birthday message from Joanna Lumley turns into a terrifying gift for Tom. Guest Cast: Joanna Lumley as Herself, Martin Jarvis as The App and Peter Davison as Himself
11	2	"The Mezzo Ten"	12 October 2022
What if an NFT was not just a ridiculous way to spend your money, but a terrifying one as well? Guest Cast: Joseph May as Lance
12	3	"WordHell"	19 October 2022
A simple word game turns n*sty. Guest Cast: Steve Brody as Ken
13	4	"Dead Funny"	26 October 2022
There seems to be a problem with the studio audience, because there shouldn't be one. Guest Cast: Geoffrey Whitehead as The Archivist
