= Barking (TV series) =

1998 British comedy television series

- Genre: Sketch comedy
- Directed by: Peter Boyd Maclean
- Starring: David Walliams; Catherine Tate; Peter Kay; Omid Djalili; Mackenzie Crook; Marcus Brigstocke
- Composers: Pete Baikie; Rowland Lee
- Country of origin: United Kingdom
- Original language: English
- No. of series: 1
- No. of episodes: 6

Production
- Producers: Alan Marke; David Spicer
- Editor: Mykola Pawluk

Original release
- Network: Channel 4
- Release: 24 June – 29 July 1998

Barking is a late-night sketch comedy show broadcast on Channel 4 in the summer of 1998. The series starred and written by David Walliams, Catherine Tate, Peter Kay, Omid Djalili, Mackenzie Crook, Marcus Brigstocke and more up-and-coming comedians, most of whom went on to successful careers. Channel 4 announced that Barking was officially cancelled after the first series.

The show was released on DVD on 7 November 2011.

== Cast ==
- Niall Ashdown
- Will Barton
- Marcus Brigstocke
- Kriston Berlevy
- Steve Brody
- Steven Burge
- Mackenzie Crook
- Omid Djalili
- Jo Enright
- Simon Greenall
- Peter Kay
- Cliff Kelly
- Dave Lamb
- Matt Lucas
- Sarah Parkinson
- Kay Stonham
- Catherine Tate
- Rhys Thomas
- Martin Trenaman
- Dan Tetsell
- Vikki Turney
- Tim Verrinder
- David Walliams
- Tony Way
- Glynne Wiley

== Episodes ==
No.	Title	Directed by	Original release date
1	"Episode 1"	Peter Boyd Maclean	24 June 1998
This first episode features a guided tour of Buckingham Palace, a WI meeting that goes horribly wrong and introduces us to Mr. Bagshaw (Mackenzie Crook): bully, sadist, social misfit, and maths teacher. There is also a special guest appearance from an Airfix Matthew Kelly blowing up a block of flats.
2	"Episode 2"	Peter Boyd Maclean	1 July 1998
Britain's most unsuccessful actor tries to get a job as a dolphin, a team of blasphemous vicars has a crisis moving into their new parish and a desperately right-on couple host a dinner party 'ethnic style'. Dialogue from this episode, voiced by Marcus Brigstocke, was sampled in the 2000 UK hit single "I Don't Smoke" by DJ Dee Kline.
3	"Episode 3"	Peter Boyd Maclean	8 July 1998
Two old school friends have a very bad night in the pub, a society wedding arranges takes a blushing bride firmly in hand and a pair of jealous lovers set out to prove their devotion to each other is deep, true, and surprisingly violent.
4	"Episode 4"	Peter Boyd Maclean	15 July 1998
We meet Liz, the leader of a fascist slimming group, Dr. Killthere-There, chief consultant at the Brave Little Soldier Hospital, and Steve and Alfie try to make their mute monkeychild Danson into the Heavyweight Champion of the World.
5	"Episode 5"	Peter Boyd Maclean	22 July 1998
Roy the custody Dad makes his weekly visit to see his daughter, Mr. Bagshaw has an unfortunate gym lesson and a Nigerian therapist fails to cure his own psychosis.
6	"Episode 6"	Peter Boyd Maclean	29 July 1998
Peter Piper has a breakdown, a Hi-de-Hi! star becomes a suspect in a series of serious crimes and a camping trip turns into a night of the living Dansons.

== Reception ==
Despite the impressive array of future successful comedy stars, the show was not a ratings hit. In the Radio Times Guide to TV Comedy (1998), critic Mark Lewisohn said, "the ideas with good potential were buried under a mountain of mediocrity... the show's clash of styles, pacing and mood worked heavily against them". However, he cited Marcus Brigstocke's psychotic airline pilot and David Walliams's insane royal watcher as standout characters.

Brian Donaldson of The List described the show as "something of a mixed bag" and noted that "there's a healthy amount of decent moments". He concluded, "Barking was never as mad as it thought it was and the show's bite was largely toothless".
