= Rudy's Rare Records =

BBC radio sitcom set in a record shop in Birmingham

Rudy's Rare Records is a sitcom series created by Lenny Henry, Danny Robins and Dan Tetsell, broadcast on BBC Radio 4. Originally a radio comedy series from 2008–2012, it was later adapted for the stage in 2014. A not-for-broadcast TV pilot was reportedly shot in 2014, but was not developed for broadcast.

The plot follows Adam Sharpe, who returns to Birmingham from London after a breakdown, and is forced to move in with his father Rudy Sharpe. They squeeze into the flat above the eponymous Rudy's Rare Records, his dad's shambolic record shop selling reggae, ska and soul. While Adam is anxious and straight-laced, Rudy is exuberant, opinionated and brash. Other characters include Adam's adult son Richie, shop employee Tasha, the self-proclaimed first black goth girl in Handsworth, Doreen, Rudy's girlfriend, and Clifton, his friend.

The series features a majority Black British cast and a soundtrack that focuses on reggae, ska and hip-hop.

== Episodes ==
=== Series 1 (2008) ===
1. "Take Me Home, Country Roads"
2. "Roots Manoeuvres"
3. "Get Up, Stand Up"
4. "The Heart of Saturday Night"

=== Series 2 (2009) ===
1. "Ill Communication"
2. "Oh Carolina"
3. "Daddy Cool"
4. "Ride With Me"

=== Series 3 (2011) ===
1. "No Richie, No Cry"
2. "It's A Family Affair"
3. "Redemption Song"
4. "Rudy's Rare Record"
5. "Lights Out"
6. "Girls and Boys"

=== Series 4 (2012) ===
1. "Three's a Crowd"
2. "Best Local Business"
3. "Let It Grow"
4. "It's Grim Up North"
5. "Miss Reenie Comes to Stay"
6. "Sound of da Police"

== Cast ==
- Larrington Walker as Rudy Sharpe
- Lenny Henry as Adam Sharpe
- Natasha Godfrey as Tasha
- Joe Jacobs as Richie Sharpe
- Claire Benedict as Doreen
- Jeffery Kissoon as Clifton
- Tracy-Ann Oberman as Alison

– Source:

== Stage adaptation ==
A stage adaptation by Henry and Robbins also titled Rudy's Rare Records opened at the Birmingham Repertory Theatre on 4 September running until 20 September, before transferring to the Hackney Empire from 24 September to 5 October 2014. The production was directed by Paulette Randall and featured Henry, Walker, Kissoon and Godfrey reprising their roles from the sitcom alongside Joivan Wade as Ritchie and Lorna Gale as Doreen.
