= 101.4 FM =

FM radio frequency

The following radio stations broadcast on FM frequency 101.4 MHz:

== Croatia ==
- Radio Kutina 101.4

== China ==
- CNR China Rural Radio in Qingtongxia
- CNR China Traffic Radio in Harbin
- CNR The Voice of China in Chengde, Fushun, and Panzhihua
- TJTRS Tianjini Economical Radio

== India ==
- AIR FM Rainbow in Chennai, Tamil Nadu

== Indonesia ==
- I-Radio in Jakarta

== Malaysia ==
- Suria in Johor Bahru, Johor and Singapore

== New Zealand ==
- RNZ National in Auckland, Tauranga and Dunedin

== United Kingdom ==
- Classic FM in Bristol & Inverness
- Flex FM
- Smooth East Midlands in Derby
- Smooth Lake District in Keswick
