= Argumental =

- Genre: Comedy
- Created by: Ricky Kelehar
- Directed by: Ian Lorimer; Geraldine Dowd
- Presented by: John Sergeant (2008–10); Sean Lock (2011–12)
- Starring: Team Captains: Marcus Brigstocke (2008–11); Rufus Hound (2008–11); Robert Webb (2011–12); Seann Walsh (2011–12)
- Theme music composer: Will Slater
- Country of origin: United Kingdom
- Original language: English
- No. of series: 4
- No. of episodes: 49 (list of episodes)

Production
- Executive producers: Gary Chippington; Clive Tulloh
- Producers: David Taylor; Dominic English
- Production locations: The London Studios (2008–10); BBC Television Centre (2011–12)
- Editors: Steve Andrews; Tim Ellison; Steve Dix; Jamie Shemeld
- Running time: 30 minutes (inc. adverts)
- Production company: Tiger Aspect Productions

Original release
- Network: Dave
- Release: 27 October 2008 – 5 January 2012

Related
- Have I Got News for You; Mock the Week; The News Quiz

Argumental (working title Whose Side Are You On?) is a British improvised comedy panel game hosted originally by John Sergeant and later Sean Lock, alongside two teams captained by Marcus Brigstocke and Rufus Hound, followed by Robert Webb and Seann Walsh, debating and arguing on various topics with help from various guests. It is made by independent production company Tiger Aspect Productions for Dave and made its debut on 27 October 2008. Series three was commissioned for Dave and four episodes from the second series aired on BBC Two, making it UKTV's most successful commission in terms of reach of audience.

== Participants ==
The programme was originally chaired by journalist John Sergeant whose post-journalistic career at the time the series began was on the rise due in part to his appearance on the BBC's Strictly Come Dancing. He was joined by team captains Marcus Brigstocke, the host of The Late Edition, and comedian Rufus Hound. Each team captain was accompanied by a guest panellist who have included Jimmy Carr, Sue Perkins, Reginald D. Hunter, Phill Jupitus, Charlie Higson, Johnny Vegas, Lucy Porter, Dara Ó Briain, Sean Lock and Frankie Boyle. From the 2011 series, Lock replaced Sergeant as presenter, while Walsh and Webb took over as team captains. This coincided with a revamp of the show's set and graphics.

== Format ==
Each episode comprises a series of rounds in which each team takes its turn debating a variety of topics, whilst also trying to be amusing. Topics have included: 'recycling is a waste of time' and 'the Royal Family serve no purpose'. After each round the team members often make humorous observations about what has just been said, before the studio audience votes for who they thought put forward the best case. Voting is done by holding up a red or blue paddle to vote for the red or blue team respectively. The votes are tallied before the winner of the round is decided. The team that wins the most rounds wins the show.

=== Rounds ===
Each episode normally contains five rounds, though some contain four rounds with one round dropped altogether.

==== Classic debate ====
A representative from each team takes their turn to argue for or against a given motion, respectively. After the main arguments have been put forward the teams are invited to discuss the subject further to reinforce their team's argument or attack their opponent's.

==== Visual aids ====
Team members try to argue over a topic while incorporating pictures from a slideshow that they have never seen before into their case.

==== Flip-flop ====
Each team is given a different topic to argue about in this round. The team representative must argue for the motion until a buzzer sounds at which point they must argue against the motion. The contestant continues to alternate between for and against until the end of round buzzer is sounded. This round does not appear in every episode.

==== That's a Brilliant Idea ====
Introduced in series 3, representatives from each team take turns being given a typically nonsensical, illogical or outrageous statement, and have to argue a convincing case for that statement being a good thing, starting each argument with the words "That's a brilliant idea.".

==== Popular culture round ====
In series 1, this round was similar to the 'classic debate' round except the topic involves a famous person or celebrity. The person being debated was represented by a life sized cut-out placed in the centre of the performance stage. Past celebrities have included Piers Morgan, Victoria Beckham, Amy Winehouse, Wayne and Coleen Rooney, Simon Cowell and Jeremy Kyle.

Since series 2, this round has not always featured cardboard cut-outs; in some episodes, real-life people (e.g. a body builder) come on stage instead.

==== Final picture round ====
This round doesn't involve any arguing per person, alternatively contestants are shown pictures for which they must invent a motion to suit. Unlike the other rounds, both teams remain seated throughout. Like the flip-flop round, this round has not always been included. The audience still votes red or blue.

== Guest appearances ==
The following appeared on the show as a guest.

6 appearances

- Jimmy Carr
- Sean Lock^{[a]}
- Mark Watson

4 appearances

- Frankie Boyle
- Phill Jupitus

3 appearances

- Chris Addison
- Stephen K. Amos
- Katy Brand
- Richard Herring
- Andrew Maxwell
- Dara Ó Briain
- Lucy Porter
- Jack Whitehall

2 appearances

- Hugh Dennis
- Charlie Higson
- Sean Hughes
- Stephen Mangan
- Sarah Millican
- Ardal O'Hanlon
- Sue Perkins
- Will Smith
- Johnny Vegas

1 appearance

- Jo Brand
- Ed Byrne
- Jason Byrne
- Jo Caulfield
- Jarred Christmas
- Simon Day
- Micky Flanagan
- Reginald D. Hunter
- Robin Ince
- Dom Joly
- Miles Jupp
- Russell Kane
- Patrick Kielty
- Jason Manford
- Rory McGrath
- Ben Miller
- Andy Parsons
- Chris Ramsey
- Daniel Sloss
- Tim Vine

a. Appearances made before becoming the host.

== Transmissions ==
=== Original series ===
Series	Episodes	Originally released	
Series	Episodes	First released	Last released
1	12	27 October 2008	26 January 2009
2	12	23 March 2009	17 November 2009
3	12	2 February 2010	2 November 2010
4	7	3 November 2011	15 December 2011

=== Specials ===
Date	Entitle
2 February 2009	The Best of Series 1
24 November 2009	The Best of Series 2 (Part 1)
1 December 2009	The Best of Series 2 (Part 2)
9 November 2010	The Best of Series 3
5 March 2011	24 Hour Panel People Comic Relief Special
22 December 2011	Christmas Special
5 January 2012	The Best of Series 4
