= John Sessions' Tall Tales =

British television show

- Written by: John Sessions
- Starring: John Sessions
- Country of origin: United Kingdom

Production
- Producer: Geoff Posner
- Production company: BBC

Original release
- Network: BBC Two
- Release: 19 January 1991

Related
- John Sessions' Likely Stories

John Sessions' Tall Tales is a British comedy written by and starring John Sessions.

The show was commissioned as a result of John Sessions' reputation for improvisation, having been a pivotal figure in the success of Whose Line Is It Anyway?, and was intended as six half-hour comic plays, to be penned by Sessions, but rooted in improvisation. All sixepisodes of John Sessions' Tall Tales were produced and directed by Geoff Posner for Pozzitive Television.
