= Jo Caulfield Won't Shut Up =

- Genre: Sitcom
- Running time: 30 minutes
- Country of origin: United Kingdom
- Language(s): English
- Home station: BBC Radio 4
- Starring: Jo Caulfield; Zoe Lyons; Nick Revell; Simon Greenall
- Written by: Jo Caulfield, Kevin Anderson
- Produced by: David Tyler
- Original release: 10 November 2009
- No. of series: 1
- No. of episodes: 4
- Audio format

Jo Caulfield Won't Shut Up is a BBC radio comedy series, written by and starring Jo Caulfield, with special guests Zoe Lyons, Simon Greenall, and Nick Revell, which first aired on BBC Radio 4 in November 2009.

The series followed Caulfield's previous series It's That Jo Caulfield Again, which also aired on Radio 4, and involved Caulfield and guests discussing diverse topics such as cheese and onion crisps, the teashops of Dundee, and Tony Benn. It was billed as being more acerbic than Radio 4's usual output, and contained moderate swearing and sexual references.

The first episode had Paul Sneedon as a special guest, and was recorded live at the Edinburgh Fringe.

The series was produced and directed by David Tyler at Pozzitive Television for BBC Radio 4.
