= I Don't Smoke =

Single by DJ Dee Kline
- Released: 22 May 2000
- Recorded: 1999
- Genre: UK garage, breakstep
- Label: EastWest
- Songwriter(s): Nick Annand
- Producer(s): Nick Annand

"I Don't Smoke" is a song by English breakbeat/UK garage musician DJ Dee Kline. Originally released in 1999 on Rat Records, the song became a major underground club hit and was re-released the following year on 22 May 2000 as an official single on EastWest. It peaked at No. 11 on the UK Singles Chart and No. 2 on the UK Dance Singles Chart.

The song features a sample of comedian Marcus Brigstocke, taken from the sketch show Barking. The sample in the song features Brigstocke repeating the lines, "Do you smoke Paul? (No I don't.) Me neither. I don't smoke cigarettes, I don't smoke cigars, I don't smoke a pipe, pipe, pipe, pipe, pipe...", followed by "I don't smoke the reefer!" in a faux Rasta accent. Brigstocke, Dan Tetsell, and Danny Robins, who had originally written the routine for a revue at Bristol University, were given publishing rights to the song after Tetsell heard it while shopping and recognised the sample.

Brigstocke talked about the song on The Graham Norton Show in 2010, explaining that he was impersonating Jim Davidson's character Chalkie White for a sketch show, and that it was sampled into the track. Brigstocke said he was "delighted and mortified at the same time" when he heard the sample. "I Don't Smoke" also samples the guitar riff from the 1997 Skeewiff track "The Thin Line".

A rework was released in 2014 in collaboration with Specimen A and Majestic MC, titled "Don't Smoke 2014".

Capital Xtra included the song in their list of "The Best Old-School Garage Anthems of All Time".

== Track listing ==
UK CD single

1. "I Don't Smoke" (radio edit) - 2:57
2. "I Don't Smoke" (nu skool rave mix) - 5:53
3. "I Don't Smoke" (Rhythm Masters remix edit) - 5:10
4. "I Don't Smoke" (original mix edit) - 5:48
