= Deekline =

DJ Deekline
- Also known as: Defkline
- Born: London, England
- Genres: Breakbeat; breakstep; UK garage; drum and bass; jungle
- Labels: Rat Records, Jungle Cakes, Sludge, Giant Pussy Records, EastWest

Deekline (also named DJ Dee Kline) is a British producer and DJ of breakbeat, breakstep, drum and bass and garage music. He is the innovator of breakstep music which is bass-heavy, breakbeat-infused 2-step, first characterised in his 1999 hit "I Don't Smoke", which reached No. 11 on the UK charts. He is the owner of Rat Records, which has released material of such artists as DJ Fresh, Jack Beats, Stanton Warriors, Wiley, Skinny Man, Rennie Pilgrem, House Breakers and Freq Nasty. Deekline has also had notable collaborations with British electronic music producers Ed Solo and Wizard. In 2011, he opened up his online clothing store, Bass Boutique.

== Biography ==
Deekline began collecting records at the age of 10, inspired by early funk, electro and hip-hop scratch DJs. He began playing house parties and raves in the London underground electronic music scene before getting involved with pirate radio, first DJing drum and bass on Don FM with his longtime MC, Hyperactive.

=== 1998–2000: Flex FM and "I Don't Smoke" ===
Deekline became owner of London's biggest pirate radio station Flex FM which predominantly played UK garage music and other underground electronic music. In 1999, he set up Rat Records to release his track "I Don't Smoke". It sold 20,000 copies on Rat Records, and then it went on to sell another 150,000, reaching number 11 on the UK Singles Chart the following year. The bass-heavy, breakbeat-infused garage sound characterised on "I Don't Smoke" became known as breakstep. The song features a sample of comedian Marcus Brigstocke from the sketch show Barking, repeating the title phrase "I don't smoke the reefer" in a faux Rasta accent. Brigstocke (possibly best known from the British TV show Argumental) is sampled on "I Don't Smoke" as saying, "I don't smoke cigarettes, I don't smoke cigars, I don't smoke a pipe, pipe, pipe, pipe..." followed by "I don't smoke the reefer!". He talked about it on the Graham Norton Show in 2010, where he explained that he was impersonating Jim Davidson's character Chalkie White for a sketch show, and that it was sampled into the track. Brigstocke said he was "delighted and mortified at the same time" when he heard the sample. The song also samples the guitar riff from the 1997 Skeewiff track "The Thin Line".

Breakstep and "I Don't Smoke" were seminal in shaping the underground electronic music scene in London, paving the way for grime and dubstep. Deekline retired from Flex FM in 2002 to focus on his own music after "I Don't Smoke" was signed by East West Records.

=== 2002–present ===
Deekline has remixed and collaborated with a variety of notable producers and has had international chart success with songs such as "The Mexican" with producer Tim Healey and "Shake the Pressure" with Florida booty bass pioneers Splack Pack. In addition to this, his collaborative projects with producer Wizard on Deekline & Wizard's Breaks, Beats and Blondes and with Ed Solo on his Jungle Cakes EPs have received international success. He also collaborated with such artists as Luke from 2 Live Crew, Splack Pack, DJ Assault, DJ Fresh, Tim Healey, Stanton Warriors, Freestylers and Krafty Kuts.

In 2009, Deekline founded the label Jungle Cakes, a sublabel of Hot Cakes and one of the biggest-selling jungle labels to date; it cleared and signed Dawn Penn's "No No No" which was championed by Kissy Sell Out on Radio One, as well as Giant Pussy Records with Tim Healey.

Deekline reworked "I Don't Smoke" in 2014 alongside trap producers Specimen A and added a new rap by Majestic, titled as "Don't Smoke 2014".

== Discography ==
=== Singles, EPs and remixes ===
- 2000: "I Don't Smoke" – UK No. 11
- 2000: "Sexy Cinderella" (EastWest)
- 2001: Beat Freaks (compilation, Clockwork Recordings)
- 2002: Bush Pig (with Phil K and DJ Ransom, Supercharger Records)
- 2004: Breaks, Beats and Blondes (collaboration with British producer Wizard on Botchit and Scarper Records)
- 2005: "Touch Your Toes" (featuring MC Darrison, Southern Fried)
- 2006: "Outta Space" (Super Star)
- 2007: "Boomblast" (Remix) – Freestylers
- 2007: "Steam (Rock Out)" (DJ Fresh vs DJ Deekline & Wizard on Breakbeat Kaos)
- 2008: "Hands Up" (with Flipside)
- 2008: "Fame and the Money" (with Wiley, Skinnyman and Hyperactive, Booty Bouncers)
- 2009: "Back Up Coming Through" (with Against the Grain, licensed by DJ Craze to Fabric Live, also remixed by Bassnectar and Krafty Kuts)
- 2009: Hardcore Beats (mix CD with Ragga Twins on Black Butter Records)
- 2009: "Dip and Get Low" – Stanton Warriors
- 2009: "One in the Front" (with DJ Assault)
- 2010: "The Mexican" (with Tim Healey)
- 2010: "Yo Yo Get Funky" (Remix) – Fast Eddie (with Tim Healey)
- 2010: "My My My" (Remix) – Armand van Helden
- 2010: "Sound Clash" (Remix) – Jessie Ware (with Ed Solo, Rack and Ruin)
- 2011: "The Bomb" (with DJ Fresh, Ivory and Wizard)
- 2011: "Shake the Pressure" (with Ed Solo featuring Splack Pack & Kidd Money on Central Station)
