= Flex FM =

Community radio station in London

- England
- Broadcast area: London&Northampton
- Frequencies: 101.4FM (London); 96.1FM (Northampton); 9A (South London SSDAB); 8B (West London SSDAB); 7D (Northampton SSDAB)

Programming
- Format: House, drum & bass, dubstep, UK garage, old skool hardcore, reggae, soul

History
- First air date: Early 1990s (Pirate); 1 July 2018; 8 years ago (Community Radio License)
- Former frequencies: 103.6FM

Links
- Webcast: www.flexfm.co.uk/on-air/
- Website: www.flexfm.co.uk

Flex FM is a London-based community radio station, which originally started life as a pirate radio station. Flex broadcasts house, drum and bass, dubstep, UK garage, old skool hardcore, reggae and soul across London on 101.4 MHz FM and South and West London on DAB.

The station is also available on FM in Northampton and on small scale DAB in Northampton, Daventry and Coventry.

== History ==
Flex was first established in 1992 as a breakaway station from Don FM and began broadcasting from Merton, South West London, on the frequency of 103.6 MHz FM. During that time, it followed the path of a number of other pirates in the capital of playing breakbeat hardcore, through jungle and drum and bass, onto UK garage, until it left the airwaves in 2003. During this first period on-air, DJs, MCs and artists to have played on the station have included DJ Deekline (who scored a number 11 UK chart hit with "I Don't Smoke" in the summer of 2000), MC Hyperactive, the Genius Cru (who had a top 20 UK chart hit with "Boom Selection" in early 2001), Billy Whizz, Lady Sovereign, Ed Rush, DJ Gunshot, Optical, Funky T, Donna Dee, LS, DJ Wise, and Paul Strobe.

After a hiatus, Flex returned in 2009 on 99.7 MHz FM, playing dubstep, UK funky, house as well as across its staple music genres. DJs, MCs and artists to have appeared on this return have included MC Sparks, Outlaw, DJ Carloss, Tempo, Nicky D, Truez, DJ Sollie, DJ Twiz, Hands Free, Al-B, Heny G, G Double, Jay 5ive (Antisocial), Selecta Primetime, Smokey Bubblin B, and Andy Mills.

In its latter days as a pirate station, Flex would feature in a special report on the BBC Newsnight programme, Inside the World of Pirate Radio, broadcast in August 2015.

== Legal licence ==
In October 2016, Flex applied for one of the forthcoming community licenses being advertised in London, which would prove to be successful in its bid in May 2017. In late 2017, it commenced fundraising for the building of new studios.

Flex started broadcasting legally as a community station as of 1 July 2018, with a roster of both original and new DJs and presenters. On 9 January 2026, Flex joined South London SSDAB and West London SSDAB.
