= The 3rd Degree (radio series) =

- Other names: The Third Degree
- Genre: Quiz show
- Running time: 28 minutes
- Country of origin: United Kingdom
- Language: English
- Home station: BBC Radio 4
- Hosted by: Steve Punt
- Created by: David Tyler
- Directed by: David Tyler
- Produced by: David Tyler
- Original release: 21 February 2011 – 19 October 2025
- No. of series: 15
- No. of episodes: 90
- Opening theme: "Ruby" by Kaiser Chiefs
- Website: BBC homepage

The 3rd Degree (sometimes written as The Third Degree) is a British quiz show broadcast on BBC Radio 4, hosted by comedian Steve Punt and made by Pozzitive Television. The series is recorded at different universities around the country, the contestants all coming from the university in which the recording takes place. One team consists of three students and the other of three lecturers (known as the "Dons") who teach the subjects the students are studying. The 3rd Degree aired from 21 February 2011 to 19 October 2025.

== Format ==
The show consists of several rounds which are as follows:

- The General Knowledge Round: Each team are asked general knowledge questions in turn, which they are allowed to confer on. If they get the question right, they score two points. If they get it wrong the question is thrown over to the other team for a bonus point.
- Specialist Subject Round 1: The first of three specialist subject rounds. The rounds are between one student and the Don who teaches them. The questions are on the academic subject that the student is learning and the Don teaches. The scoring is asymmetric in favour of the student. Correct answers score two points. If a Don gets a question wrong it can go over for a bonus point to the student, but if a student gets a question wrong no bonus is given.
- The List Round: Each team is given 30 seconds to list as many things in a given category (time begins after Punt finishes reading the question). One point is given for each correct answer (indicated by a "ping" sound effect). If eight correct answers are given in the time limit, a ninth bonus point is awarded.
- Specialist Subject Round 2: The second specialist subject round. Follows the same format as the first.
- Highbrow Lowbrow: Referred to by some as the show's "Signature round", here each contestant is given a short clue to a question and are then asked if they want to answer a highbrow or a lowbrow question based on the clue. The students score two points if they get the highbrow question right or one point if they get the lowbrow question right. For the Dons, it is the other way around (one point for highbrow, two points for lowbrow). When the contestant chooses the question, their academic rival has to answer the question not chosen.
- Specialist Subject Round 3: The third and final specialist subject round. Follows the same format as the others.
- The Quick Fire Round: The final general knowledge "bell and buzzer" round (the students have a bell, the Dons have a buzzer). Correct answers score one point. Incorrect interruptions lose one point. Questions are not thrown over to the other side.

== Reception ==
Reviews for The 3rd Degree have been mixed. A review in The Guardian, published during the show's first series, was critical of the show's pacing. The reviewer wrote: "There are lots of rather lukewarm, predictable asides", adding that the show "lacks pace and excitement, and you know the dons will win." Iain Weaver from UKGameshows gave a positive review of the series, saying: "We're not tremendously upset by the way the teachers went through the series unbeaten, they are university lecturers, and university lecturers are meant to know an awful lot. We also liked the way Steve Punt kept the programme flowing at a decent pace, adding jokes and asides, and keeping proceedings moving along most enjoyably. He's probably helped by the audience at the student bar, who have doubtlessly taken this opportunity to have their one pint of something for the week. If there's one slight criticism we'd make, it's that the Highbrow Lowbrow round is a bit of a block in the middle of the programme. We might prefer to split the round into two parts, perhaps shifting the first immediately before the lists round. That would add a little bit more variety, and make the programme a little less imposing. That's just a minor criticism: most of what The 3rd Degree does, it does well. Given that it replaced the venerable Quote... Unquote, it didn't have a high bar, but we can see this programme running for a fair few years."

=== Awards ===
In 2015 The 3rd Degree was nominated for the Rose d'Or in the "Radio Game Show" category.

== Episodes ==
=== Series 1 ===
Episode	Date broadcast	University	Specialist subjects	Students score	Dons score
1	21 February 2011	University of Southampton	Biomedical sciences; English; Mathematics	20	25
2	28 February 2011	Durham University	English literature; Earth science; Law	20	45
3	7 March 2011	University of Stirling	Psychology; English literature; Marketing	23	23
4	14 March 2011	University of Reading	Food science; English and American literature; International relations	32	40
5	21 March 2011	University of Salford	English literature (Romantics to Modern); Criminology; Military history	18	35
6	28 March 2011	Middlesex University	Child nursing; Art and Design; Biology	27	37

=== Series 2 ===
Episode	Date broadcast	University	Specialist subjects	Students score	Dons score
1	12 March 2012	University of East Anglia	Film studies; Computer science; History of art	19	30
2	19 March 2012	Swansea University	Classics; Law; English literature	22	34
3	26 March 2012	University of Warwick	Philosophy; Chemistry; Economics	37	26
4	2 April 2012	University of Sussex	European literature; Cognitive science; 20th century drama	25	35
5	9 April 2012	Queen Mary, University of London	Biology; Modern history; Law	22	35
6	16 April 2012	University of Northampton	History of crime; Journalism; Popular music	25	35

=== Series 3 ===
Episode	Date broadcast	University	Specialist subjects	Students score	Dons score
1	25 March 2013	Anglia Ruskin University	Film studies; Social work; Graphic design	28	35
2	1 April 2013	University of Exeter	Biosciences; Psychology; Philosophy	25	22
3	8 April 2013	University of Edinburgh	Biosciences; History of art; International relations	29	36
4	15 April 2013	University of Leicester	Medicine; Sociology; Astrophysics	33	38
5	22 April 2013	Bath Spa University	Creative music technology; Creative writing; Geography	22	24
6	29 April 2013	University of Leeds	Civil engineering; Popular music; Psychology	29	27

=== Series 4 ===
Episode	Date broadcast	University	Specialist subjects	Students score	Dons score
1	7 April 2014	University of Bristol	English literature to 1700; Physics; Religion and theology	30	40
2	14 April 2014	University of Kent	Anthropology; Journalism; Computing	32	31
3	21 April 2014	University of Bedfordshire	Psychology; Theatre and professional practice; Sports science	23	31
4	28 April 2014	Aberystwyth University	Information studies; Welsh language and literature; History of art	19	29
5	5 May 2014	University of Nottingham	History; Management studies; Philosophy	20	17
6	12 May 2014	University of Birmingham	History of medicine; Social policy; American studies	34	25

=== Series 5 ===
Episode	Date broadcast	University	Specialist subjects	Students score	Dons score
1	27 April 2015	Cardiff University	Biology; Journalism, media and cultural studies; Astrophysics	31	29
2	9 May 2015 (Note: Episode delayed due to coverage of the 2015 BBC Food and Farming Awards.)	University of Manchester	Biology; American studies; Medicine	22	36
3	11 May 2015	University of Essex	Politics; Literature; 20th century history	31	41
4	18 May 2015	De Montfort University	Forensic science; Film studies; Contour fashion	30	28
5	25 May 2015	Aston University	Law; Psychology; Computer science	22	38
6	1 June 2015	University of Surrey	Politics; Business studies; Physics	25	35

=== Series 6 ===
Episode	Date broadcast	University	Specialist subjects	Students score	Dons score
1	9 May 2016	University of York	History of art; Theatre, film and television studies; Physics	22	30
2	16 May 2016	University of Gloucestershire	Biosciences; Media studies; Religious studies	20	32
3	23 May 2016	University of Chester	Archaeology; English; Computer science	27	26
4	30 May 2016	University of Glasgow	Earth sciences; Medicine; Astrophysics and cosmology	22	33
5	6 June 2016	Birmingham City University	Visual communication; English literature; Sociology	25	29
6	13 June 2016	University of Bath	Biology; Politics; Maths	17	30

=== Series 7 ===
Episode	Date broadcast	University	Specialist subjects	Students score	Dons score
1	22 May 2017	University of Roehampton	Anthropology; Law; Linguistics	22	33
2	29 May 2017	Queen's University Belfast	History; Medicine; English	24	30
3	5 June 2017	University of Derby	Forensics; Education studies; Theatre arts	27	26
4	12 June 2017	St John's College, Cambridge	History; Human, social and political sciences; Physics	22	32
5	19 June 2017	University of Hull	American studies; History; Business and management	22	27
6	26 June 2017	University of Liverpool	Physiology; Egyptology; Psychology	31	32

=== Series 8 ===
Episode	Date broadcast	University	Specialist subjects	Students score	Dons score
1	25 June 2018	Newcastle University	Physiological sciences; Sociology; Media and communication studies	30	30
2	2 July 2018	University of Hertfordshire	Aerospace engineering; English language and communication; Computer science	23	29
3	9 July 2018	University of Dundee	Geography; Animation; Physics	19	32
4	16 July 2018	Merton College, Oxford	Biology; Classics; History	39	26
5	23 July 2018	University of Sheffield	Archaeology; Dental hygiene and therapy; Civil engineering	24	31
6	30 July 2018	Brunel University	Politics; Theatre; Computer science	27	30

=== Series 9 ===
Episode	Date broadcast	University	Specialist subjects	Students score	Dons score
1	22 July 2019	Royal Holloway, University of London	Criminology; English; Law	27	36
2	29 July 2019	University of Aberdeen	Linguistics; Law; Music	27	25
3	5 August 2019	University of Plymouth	Geology; History; Human biosciences	24	33
4	12 August 2019	St Catharine's College, Cambridge	Veterinary medicine; French studies; Geography	29	33
5	19 August 2019	University of Brighton	Biomedical sciences; Marketing; Globalisation	24	38
6	26 August 2019	Oxford Brookes University	Anthropology; Motorsport engineering; Human biology	26	23

=== Series 10 ===
Episode	Date broadcast	University	Specialist subjects	Students score	Dons score
1	29 June 2020	Bournemouth University	Psychology; Nursing; Economics	28	29
2	6 July 2020	Imperial College London	Material science; Biochemistry; Mathematics	21	39
3	13 July 2020	University of Reading	Linguistics; Law; Film and theatre studies	17	32
4	20 July 2020	Durham University	Classics; Education; Modern history	36	30
5	27 July 2020	Ulster University	Engineering; Sports science; Pharmacy	25	40
6	3 August 2020	Mansfield College, Oxford	English; Physics; Theology	23	36

=== Series 11 ===
Episode	Date broadcast	University	Specialist subjects	Students score	Dons score
1	31 May 2021	University of Southampton	Biological Sciences; Fashion Design; Film studies	29	31
2	7 June 2021	University of Cumbria	Marine and freshwater biology; Education; Forestry management and conservation	28	32
3	14 June 2021	Brasenose College, Oxford	Philosophy; Law; Chemistry	32	21
4	21 June 2021	Anglia Ruskin University	Sociology; Optometry; Psychology	38	30
5	28 June 2021	University of Northampton	International Development; Law and Organized Crime; Nursing	24	25
6	5 July 2021	Nottingham Trent University	English Literature; Broadcast Journalism; Law	29	37

=== Series 12 ===
Episode	Date broadcast	University	Specialist subjects	Students score	Dons score
1	20 June 2022	University College London	Biochemical engineering; Psychology; English literature	15	29
2	27 June 2022	Leeds Beckett University	Journalism; Sport and exercise science; English literature	29	29
3	4 July 2022	Gonville and Caius College, Cambridge	History; Physics; Economics	29	33
4	11 July 2022	University of Warwick	Engineering; Linguistics; Statistics	33	27
5	18 July 2022	Bangor University	Zoology with herpetology; Film studies; Educational sciences	26	41
6	25 July 2022	Lancaster University	Marketing; French studies; English literature	31	31

=== Series 13 ===
Episode	Date broadcast	University	Specialist subjects	Students score	Dons score
1	3 July 2023	University of Exeter	Economics; Natural sciences; History	18	35
2	10 July 2023	University of Strathclyde	Creative writing; Business analysis and technology; Civil and environmental engineering	13	23
3	17 July 2023	Somerville College, Oxford	Classical archaeology and ancient history; Physics; Linguistics	22	41
4	24 July 2023	Keele University	Film studies; Medicine; Law	29	29
5	31 July 2023	King's College London	Law; Cosmology; Culture, media and creative industries	32	37
6	7 August 2023	University of Portsmouth	Musical theatre; Maths; Psychology	23	28

=== Series 14 ===
Episode	Date broadcast	University	Specialist subjects	Students score	Dons score
1	14 July 2024	University of Leicester	French; Genetics; Criminology	27	34
2	21 July 2024	University of St Andrews	English; Computer science; Philosophy	31	30
3	28 July 2024	Loughborough University	Construction management; Sport & society with sport science; Maths	23	39
4	4 August 2024	Falmouth University	Film studies; Journalism; Creative writing	29	33
5	11 August 2024	Robinson College, Cambridge	Law; English; Spanish	31	28
6	18 August 2024	University of East Anglia	Physics; History; Biology	31	33

=== Series 15 ===
Episode	Date broadcast	University	Specialist subjects	Students score	Dons score
1	14 September 2025	University of Bristol	History; Environmental geoscience; Theatre and performance studies	24	32
2	21 September 2025	Queen Mary, University of London	Medicine; Politics; Dentistry	30	36
3	28 September 2025	University of Kent	Forensic science; Architecture; English literature	22	39
4	5 October 2025	Worcester College, Oxford	Theology; Mathematics; History	30	31
5	12 October 2025	Manchester Metropolitan University	Law; Mental health nursing; Digital marketing	25	28
6	19 October 2025	University of Edinburgh	Theology; Jewellery & silversmithing; Medicine	29	28

=== Scores ===
Students	Dons
Series wins (1 drawn)
0	14
Episode wins (5 drawn)
20	65

== See also ==
- University Challenge
