= We Are History =

BBC spoof history documentary

- Titlescreen of series 1, featuring Marcus Brigstocke.
- Genre: Comedy; Satire
- Starring: Marcus Brigstocke; Danny Robins; Daniel Tetsell
- Original language: English
- No. of seasons: 2
- No. of episodes: 12

Production
- Running time: 9 minutes
- Production company: BBC Entertainment

Original release
- Network: BBC Two
- Release: 3 April 2000 – 30 October 2001

We Are History is a British comedy series broadcast on the BBC. It ran for two series of six ten-minute episodes.

The series was a parody of historical and archaeological documentaries, especially those of the Time Team, Meet the Ancestors and Simon Schama. Marcus Brigstocke played dubious historian David Oxley, who would attempt to 'recreate' a number of historical events in a modern setting. In one episode, he recreated the Viking invasion of Britain in "the last bastion of Viking control" – an IKEA store. In another, he recreated the Spanish Armada in a swimming pool with children throwing foam balls at one another.

Much of the humour derived from Oxley's singular incompetence and stupidity. He seemed totally unaware of the facts of history and often made things up as he went along. Each episode had a general theme that offered a view of history totally at odds with the known facts – such as Camelot being buried underneath Heathrow Airport or the Norman invasion being a bunch of French visitors who overstayed their welcome and got carried away. In every episode, Oxley talked of "new evidence unearthed by local enthusiasts".

== Transmissions ==
Series	Episodes	Originally released	
Series	Episodes	First released	Last released
1	6	3 April 2000	17 April 2000
2	6	25 September 2001	30 October 2001

== Episodes ==
=== Series 1 (2000) ===
No. overall	No. in series	Title	Directed by	Original release date
1	1	"Boadicea: Myth or Missus?"	Sean Grundy	3 April 2000
2	2	"King Arthur: Myth or Legend?"	Sean Grundy	4 April 2000
3	3	"Our Friends in the Norse"	Sean Grundy	10 April 2000
4	4	"Hunchback!"	Sean Grundy	12 April 2000
5	5	"Armada!"	Sean Grundy	14 April 2000
6	6	"Oliver's Army"	Sean Grundy	17 April 2000

=== Series 2 (2001) ===
No. overall	No. in series	Title	Directed by	Original release date
7	1	"Conquered!"	Alex Walsh-Taylor	25 September 2001
8	2	"The Real Robin Hood"	Alex Walsh-Taylor	2 October 2001
9	3	"Fire"	Alex Walsh-Taylor	9 October 2001
10	4	"Bonnie Prince Charlie: Too Scot to Handle?"	Alex Walsh-Taylor	16 October 2001
11	5	"The Industrial Revolution: Factory or Friction?"	Alex Walsh-Taylor	23 October 2001
12	6	"Any Old Iron Age?"	Alex Walsh-Taylor	30 October 2001
