= The Woody Allen Reader =

The Woody Allen Reader was a radio series adapting some of the written works of Woody Allen, broadcast on BBC Radio 4 between June and July, 1988. There were six episodes, ranging from the fully formed playlet 'Death Knocks', to some adaptations of Allen's dialogues and spoofs in two or three parts ('Mr Big', 'Selections from the Allen Notebooks'). Every part was played by Kerry Shale, who had gained a formidable reputation for his one-man performances in shows such as his 'Confederacy of Dunces' before being cast in the role, and produced and directed by David Tyler.

Woody Allen's producers would only sanction the show on the strictest of conditions - that there would be no repeats, and that the tapes would be destroyed after transmission. As a result, no official copies of the recording survive.
