= The Brig Society =

BBC radio comedy show

- Marcus Brigstocke in The Brig Society

The Brig Society is a satirical stand-up and sketch comedy show hosted by Marcus Brigstocke. It was broadcast for the first time on BBC Radio 4 on Wednesday 26 June 2013 at 18:30. and a second series began on 1 August 2014, with the third series starting on 17 September 2015.

In addition to Brigstocke, it stars Rufus Jones, William Andrews, Colin Hoult and Margaret Cabourn-Smith.

The title is a pun on "The Big Society", a core British Conservative Party proposal that sought to phase out government services and replace them with volunteer campaigns. The programme, a comic monologue punctuated by sketches, challenges the proposal by imagining the nightmare that would ensue if the volunteer were Marcus Brigstocke. Each week, Brigstocke has volunteered and "been put in charge of a thing", such as a hospital, the railways, British Fashion, a prison, or a drug cartel. Each week he starts out by thinking "Well, it can’t be that difficult, surely?" and ends up realizing "Oh - turns out it’s utterly difficult and complicated. Who knew...?" In the process he outlines a critique of social attitudes and government responses to the institution under discussion. Following the end of the series proper, The Brig Society has returned in the form of limited or one-off specials, namely a two-part special concerning British newsprint media, and the 2022 episode "The CoBrig Society", which satirised responses to the coronavirus pandemic.

The series featured the characters Lord and Lady Bagshot, originally from the radio series The Museum of Everything starring and partly written by Brigstocke, who reprised his role as the latter. Continuing their role as aristocrats forced to open their family estate to the public as a National Trust property, they appeared in sketches reflecting on the history of an episode's topic.

The theme music seems to name Mr. Brigstocke but is instead the 1970 funk/soul recording "Mr. Big Stuff" performed by Jean Knight.

The show was written by Marcus Brigstocke, Jeremy Salsby, Toby Davies, Nick Doody, Tom Neenan and Steve Punt. It was produced by David Tyler.
