= The Comic Side of 7 Days =

British television programme

The Comic Side of 7 Days Logo

The Comic Side of 7 Days is a British television programme shown from 2005 on BBC Three. It is a topical comedy programme which shows the satirical side of the past 7 days of news. It was broadcast weekly on a Friday, with several repeats during the following week. The show was created by Andy Marlatt and Tony Roche. It was produced and directed by David Tyler.

The number seven features heavily during the programme and features in several lists between sections.

Various comedians comment on the week's news. These have included Jo Caulfield, Richard Herring, Will Smith, Lucy Porter, John Oliver and Junior Simpson. The main narrator is Jon Holmes. The voiceover artists are Emma Kennedy and Ewan Bailey.
