= Ed Solo =

British drum and bass DJ

- Born: Ed Bickley
- Origin: United Kingdom
- Genres: Electronic, breakbeat, ragga jungle, dubstep, drum and bass
- Occupations: Disc jockey, producer
- Instrument: Turntables
- Labels: Emotive Records, Sludge, Jungle Cakes

Ed Solo (born Ed Bickley) is a British disc jockey and record producer of electronic dance music. He has worked with artists including Blak Twang, Deekline, MC Det, Fatboy Slim, Roots Manuva, Shy FX, DJ Swift, DJ Trace and Elisabeth Troy.

== Career ==
Solo's first releases were "125th Street" and "The Danger", co-produced with label boss Dave. Solo and Stone went under the name Click and Cycle.

In 1997, he moved to Brighton and set up a studio with Stone. Solo started working with DJ Brockie and the pair made "Reprasent", Undiluted's first release, which reached number one on all the drum-and-bass charts. Brockie and Solo continued to make more songs, including "Turntable 1", "Echo Box" (on the True Playaz label) and "System Check".

Solo became involved in the nu skool breaks in 2005; his studio was located above Krafty Kuts's old record shop. He then began working with Krafty Kuts and later the pair began co-producing music together on Krafty Kut's album Freakshow (2006). Within Nu Skool Breaks, Solo has also collaborated with musicians including Deekline, Darrison, Skool of Thought, as well as mixing down tunes for breakbeat artists including Freq Nasty and Splitloop.

In 2007 Solo collaborated with Skool of Thought to release the underground dance album Random Acts of Kindness, which, in a 4* review in DMC World, was said to feature a "raging party-starting mentality". Between 2008 and 2010, Solo had been making dubstep music such as the anthemic "Age of Dub", which was released on Sludge, a label he established with Deekline. Throughout the 2010s he released Jungle music with Deekline on their label Jungle Cakes.

He is also involved in a project, BattleJam, with British DMC champ 2007 "JFB" and UK beatbox champ "Beardyman" which involves live beatbox, sampling, looping, video scratching as well as crowd-sampling interaction.

== Discography ==
Ed Solo singles
Title	Artist	Year	Peak UK Singles
Roar	Ed Solo	1999	
Mars/Echo Box	DJ Brockie & Ed Solo	2002	79
Sleeping Giant/Piano Tu	DJ Brockie & Ed Solo	2003	95
Aborigini Bass/Bioplasma	DJ Brockie & Ed Solo	2003	89
System Check	DJ Brockie & Ed Solo	2004	68
When I was a Yout	Ed Solo & Skool of Thought	2008	90
