= The Strategic Humour Initiative =

British and American comedy television special

The Strategic Humour Initiative was a half-hour topical comedy and variety special hosted by David Frost, which was a joint production among the UK, the US, and Canada. The show aired on 14 October 2003 in the United States, and on 15 October 2003, in the UK and Canada. Frost appeared in London, along with co-hosts Jimmy Tingle in Boston and Mary Walsh in Toronto.

Other contributors included Jimmy Carr, Rory Bremner, and Carla Collins. Olivia Colman also featured, performing 'The Cat In The Hat In Iraq', a parody of Dr. Seuss written by Steve Punt. The show was recorded on location in London by Pozzitive Television, then adapted for broadcasting by WGBH Boston in the US and CBC in Canada.

Frost hoped that the special would be a pilot for an ongoing television series, but the show was not picked up for further episodes.

== Reception ==
On 16 October, The Daily Telegraph wrote that the special "sank almost without a trace yesterday, bursting a bubble of pre-broadcast excitement in the US media."
