= The Big Fun Show (radio show) =

BBC radio programme

The Big Fun Show was a short-lived radio BBC programme that aired between January and February 1988. There were six half-hour episodes, and it was broadcast on BBC Radio 4. It starred Paul Merton, John Irwin, Tony Hawks, Josie Lawrence, Neil Mullarkey, and Julian Clary.

It was produced and directed by David Tyler.

== Notes and references ==
Lavalie, John. "The Big Fun Show". EpGuides. Archived from the original on 1 July 2020.
