= Agendum (radio series) =

Parody news and current affairs show

- Genre: Sitcom
- Running time: 30 minutes
- Country of origin: United Kingdom
- Language(s): English
- Starring: Carrie Quinlan, Jess Robinson, Justin Edwards,
- Written by: Joel Morris, Jason Hazeley
- Produced by: David Tyler
- Original release: August 2018 – September 2019
- No. of series: 2
- No. of episodes: 8

Agendum is a fictional topical news show and current affairs parody by Joel Morris and Jason Hazeley. The first series was broadcast on BBC Radio 4 in August 2018, and within half an hour of airing had been recommissioned for a second series, which was broadcast in February 2019. Both series were produced by Pozzitive Television.

== Episode list ==
Original Air Date	Episode Title
Series 1	
21 August 2018	Breakthrough
28 August 2018	Crisis
4 September 2018	Shock
11 September 2018	Threat

Original Air Date	Episode Title
Series 2	
26 September 2019	Stalemate
3 October 2019	Timebomb
10 October 2019	Meltdown
17 October 2019	Good Luck Everybody

== Critical reception ==
Agendum was received positively in The Guardian, with Miranda Sawyer writing that "it really made me laugh", and independent blogger The Cambridge Geek also praised the show, writing "this is a bloody funny programme". In 2019, Agendum was shortlisted for the BBC's Audio Drama Awards for 'Best Scripted Comedy (Sketch Show)'. In 2020, Agendum was nominated for a Rose D'Or Award
