= Breakstep =

Music genre

- Stylistic origins: 2-step; breakbeat; drum and bass
- Cultural origins: Late 1990s, London, UK
- Derivative forms: Dubstep

Breakstep, or breakbeat garage, is a genre of music that evolved from the UK garage scene and influenced the emergence of dubstep.

== History ==
Breakstep evolved from the 2-step garage sound. Moving away from the more soulful elements of garage, it incorporated downtempo drum and bass style basslines, trading the shuffle of 2-step for a more straightforward breakbeat drum pattern. The breakthrough for this style came in 1999 from DJ Dee Kline's "I Don't Smoke" selling 15,000 units on Rat Records, until eventually being licensed to EastWest in 2000 and climbing to number 11 on the UK Singles Chart. Following this came DJ Zinc's "138 Trek", an experiment with drum and bass production at UK garage tempo (138 bpm). This instigated a dialog between breaks and garage producers, with Forward>> (a club night at Plastic People, London) playing host to Zed Bias and Oris Jay (a.k.a. Darqwan). They were mirrored in breaks by producers such as DJ Distance.
