= Giles Wemmbley-Hogg Goes Off =

UK radio program

- BBC Radio Collection audio CD cover
- Other names: Giles Wemmbley-Hogg Geht zum Fussballweltmeisterschaft weg!
- Genre: Comedy travelogue
- Running time: 30 minutes
- Country of origin: United Kingdom
- Language: English
- Home station: BBC Radio 4
- Starring: Marcus Brigstocke
- Written by: Marcus Brigstocke; Jeremy Salsby; Graeme Garden
- Produced by: David Tyler
- Original release: 16 July 2002 – 19 December 2011
- No. of series: 7
- No. of episodes: 30
- Audio format: Stereophonic sound

Giles Wemmbley-Hogg Goes Off is a BBC Radio 4 comedy written by Marcus Brigstocke, Jeremy Salsby and Graeme Garden, produced by Pozzitive Television.

== Format and history ==
The show follows the travel adventures of title character Giles Wemmbley-Hogg ("Two Ms, two Gs", full name: Giles Peter St John David Habakkuk St John Wemmbley-Hogg), a nice but somewhat dim upper class former public school boy (Charterhouse) played by co-writer Brigstocke. Giles is on a gap year before university, and he records his (mis)adventures with his portable digital recorder, in places such as Bolivia, India, and Egypt. Throughout the series he does somehow graduate, albeit with a 2:2 in Canadian Studies. Later episodes have followed Giles in his search for a job and his engagement to the fearsome Arabella (fondly known as Belly-Bells).

Themes in this comedy are Giles's naïveté, and small-mindedness, with his frequent (and usually inappropriate) comparisons with life back in his native Budleigh Salterton. In Giles' first broadcast incarnation, as a recurring character performed by Brigstocke on satirical radio show The Now Show, he is offensively boorish and unlikeable. However, in Giles Wemmbley-Hogg Goes Off he is a sympathetic fool and clearly does not mean any harm. Broadly similar characters are Harry Enfield's Tim Nice-But-Dim, and P. G. Wodehouse's Bertie Wooster. On 9 April 2006, Brigstocke appeared in BBC Radio 4's Classic Serial adaptation of The Code of the Woosters as Bertie Wooster with Andrew Sachs as Jeeves.

The show is sometimes available online in the 'Comedy and Quizzes' section of the BBC radio on-demand website. The series is often repeated on BBC Radio 4 Extra.

In July 2007 Giles appeared on BBC Four television in Giles Wemmbley-Hogg Goes to Glastonbury, which contained a mixture of material from throughout the history of the radio show and from the similarly titled Radio 4 episode which had been broadcast only the week previously.

Series 4 was first broadcast on Radio 4 starting on Monday 14 December 2009 at 11:30am.

One of the special features on Brigstocke's 2007 standup DVD Planet Corduroy is a one-man lecture given in character by Giles Wemmbley-Hogg.

After an eight-year gap Giles Wemmbley-Hogg returned for a special Brexit episode broadcast on BBC Radio 4 on 28 March 2019, the day before the United Kingdom was originally due to leave the European Union.

== Episode list ==
Series	Episode	Destination	First broadcast	Description
1	1	The Sudan	16 July 2002	Giles' first trip sees him going off to Sudan for some fishing.
1	2	Beijing	23 July 2002	For his Duke of Edinburgh Award, Giles decides to rebuild the Great Wall of China.
1	3	Bolivia	30 July 2002	Giles goes on a jungle trek in search of a rare bird species.
1	4	The Arctic	6 August 2002	Giles gets stuck on the ice cap and has to stay in a research station.
1	5	Moscow	13 August 2002	With the Budleigh Salterton Donkey Sanctuary in mind, Giles plans to ride from England to Russia on a racing tandem, but his friend Toby pulls out...
1	6	Thailand	20 August 2002	On a spiritual journey, Giles goes to Thailand to find himself... and his rucksack.
2	1	Tanzania	15 October 2003	Now at university doing Canadian studies, Giles decides to go to Africa to 'Save the Giraffe'........... in a 14-foot giraffe costume.
2	2	Germany	22 October 2003	After his sister pulls a sickie, Giles decides to step in and go on a German exchange.
2	3	Cuba	29 October 2003	As a part of Socialist Soc., Giles goes to Cuba to find inspiration.
2	4	Egypt	5 November 2003	In a bid to twin Cairo with his native Budleigh Salterton, Giles visits the Egyptian capital to see if it is up to standard.
2	5	India	12 November 2003	Giles has made the Durham University cricket team, and subsequently goes on tour with them to the home of "Native Americans".
2	6	New Zealand	19 November 2003	To stop the love of his life from marrying someone else, Giles goes all the way to New Zealand in an attempt to stop the wedding.
3	1	Scotland	25 January 2005	After gaining his degree in Canadian Studies, Giles looks for work, firstly on an oil rig.
3	2	Tokyo	1 February 2005	The next step in Giles' career sees him go to Tokyo and work in the stock market.
3	3	The Alps	8 February 2005	Giles becomes a chalet girl in a French skiing resort.
3	4	Russia	15 February 2005	Giles becomes fourth cultural attaché to Vienna, and accompanies a Geordie "dancing prodigy" across Europe.
3	5	Haiti	22 February 2005	Giles helps build a home for CHAVS.
3	6	Ireland	1 March 2005	In an attempt to become a journalist, Giles becomes a nanny, and takes the children to Ireland.
	1	Germany	15 June 2006	Giles Wemmbley-Hogg Geht zum Fussballweltmeisterschaft weg! - Giles returns to Germany for some peace and quiet, only to find that the World Cup is being held there.
	2	Germany	22 June 2006	Giles Wemmbley-Hogg Geht zum Fussballweltmeisterschaft weg! - Giles returns to Germany for some peace and quiet, only to find that the World Cup is being held there.
	3	Germany	29 June 2006	Giles Wemmbley-Hogg Geht zum Fussballweltmeisterschaft weg! - Giles returns to Germany for some peace and quiet, only to find that the World Cup is being held there.
	1	Glastonbury	26 June 2007	Giles goes to the Glastonbury Festival and attempts to sell pasties from around the world.
4	1	Greece	14 December 2009	Giles goes to Greece to rescue a group of philosophy students.
4	2	Lapland	21 December 2009	Giles visits Lapland and has a mishap Involving his-mother in-law.
4	3	Orient Express	28 December 2009	Giles takes four cross ladies on a septuagenarian trans-Balkan hen party.
4	4	Las Vegas	4 January 2010	It's Viva Las Vegas as Giles accidentally gets three wives in a row and loses the jackpot.
5	1	Local Hero	28 November 2011	When a mogul tries to buy up every last pebble in Budleigh, Giles decides to run for Mayor.
5	2	Iron Man	5 December 2011	Giles enters an Iron Man triathlon in Spain with only Neil Diamond and a donkey to help.
5	3	Festival Of Yumsk	12 December 2011	When Giles tries to put Budleigh Salterton on the gastronomic map, he inadvertently serves up a full-scale biohazard lockdown instead.
5	4	Rocket Man	19 December 2011	Giles gets himself into another spot of bother - a rocket-powered one.
	1	Article 50	28 March 2019	Giles returns for a one off Brexit special.

== Availability ==
Four episodes from the 1st Series (not the episodes 'Moscow' and 'Beijing') and the entire 2nd Series are available on CD, and series 1-5 are available at the iTunes Store.
