= Gareth Cheeseman =

- Coogan's Run character
- First appearance: 1995
- Last appearance: 1995
- Portrayed by: Steve Coogan

In-universe information
- Occupation: Salesman

Gareth Cheeseman was a fictional salesman played by Steve Coogan in the episode "Dearth of a Salesman" of Coogan's series Coogan's Run.
