= Excuse My French (2006 TV series) =

- Genre: Documentary
- Starring: Liza Tarbuck; Ron Atkinson; Marcus Brigstocke; Esther Rantzen
- Country of origin: United Kingdom
- Original language: English
- No. of series: 1
- No. of episodes: 4

Production
- Running time: 60 minutes
- Production company: RDF Television

Original release
- Network: BBC Two
- Release: 18 July – 8 August 2006

Excuse My French is an RDF language programme on the BBC. Three celebrities with varying levels of French had one month to learn enough of the language to carry out a task related to their area of expertise in French. They did this while staying in a villa in Provence. They were helped by three teachers (Thierry, Patricia, and Christine) from the Institut Français. The series was screened on BBC Two on Tuesday evenings at 9 pm in July and August 2006 and consisted of four episodes.

It featured Esther Rantzen, Marcus Brigstocke and Ron Atkinson. Rantzen had the best knowledge of French of the three celebrities, and at the end of the series, her task was to interview a politician on a television show. Brigstocke had a basic knowledge of French to begin the show but showed much improvement throughout the series, culminating in him performing a comedy sketch entirely in French. Atkinson started the show with no knowledge of French (although he has a little knowledge of Spanish) and faced the steepest learning curve so that at the end of the month, he could give a short analysis of a football match on French radio.

The show was more light entertainment than educational. The contestants often did not take it seriously, which led to several entertaining confrontations between the students and their tutors, especially Atkinson with his teacher Christine. However, at the end of the series, all three celebrities successfully performed their task.

There was some criticism over the programme, particularly the area where the students were, as the Provençal have a strong regional accent, an experience akin to learning English in Newcastle. Plus, some teachers' attitudes were seen as harsh, and some tasks were seen as much too complicated, such as making deliveries to people but with something deliberately put wrong in their deliveries.
