= The Battersea Poltergeist =

Horror podcast by BBC Radio 4

The Battersea Poltergeist is a horror podcast and audio drama produced by Bafflegab Productions and presented by Danny Robins. The podcast was broadcast on BBC Sounds and BBC Radio 4. The show was nominated for a British Podcast Award, Audio and Radio Industry Award, and a New York Festivals Radio Award.

== Background ==
The podcast was produced by Bafflegab Productions and presented by Danny Robins. The podcast is a documentary of a true story with dramatized reenactment.

== Reception ==
Nicholas Quah wrote in Vulture that "It's nothing transcendental, but boy is it a good time."

=== Awards ===
Award	Date	Category	Result	Ref.
British Podcast Awards	2022	Best True Crime Podcast	Nominated	
Audio and Radio Industry Awards	2022	Best New Show	Finalist	
Audio and Radio Industry Awards	2022	The Creative Innovation Award	Finalist	
New York Festivals Radio Awards	2021	Best Podcast	Finalist	

== Adaptation ==
In May 2021, the podcast was set to be adapted into a scripted and unscripted series. The adaptation was created by Maniac Productions and Blumhouse Productions and distributed by Peacock. The scripted series is titled The Battersea Poltergeist and the unscripted series is called Blumhouse's Ghost Story. The companies also secured the rights to the book called The Poltergeist Prince of London: The Remarkable True Story of the Battersea Poltergeist.
