= Stephen Fry's 'Live From The Lighthouse' =

AIDs fundraiser

Stephen Fry's 'Live From The Lighthouse' was a charity fundraiser hosted by Stephen Fry on World AIDS Day in 1998, which took over Channel 4 for an evening of comedy and music to raise money for the Terrence Higgins Trust. Hosted by Stephen Fry with Mel Giedroyc and Sue Perkins, the night included performances from Elton John, Victoria Wood, Noel Gallagher, Boy George, All Saints, and many more.

Some particular highlights included Steve Coogan as Alan Partridge interviewing Noel Gallagher, a performance from Sacha Baron Cohen as Ali G, and a section called "Heroes on Heroes", whereby stars talked about a particular person who had meant a lot to them, who had been affected by AIDS. Michael Palin, Boy George and Wayne Sleep were all contributors.

There was also a live donations line, run by celebrities in order to take donations from the public. The celebrity callers included Max Beesley, Luisa Bradshaw-White, Melvyn Bragg, Adam Buxton, Joe Cornish, Alan Davies, Angus Deayton, E17, Les Ferdinand, Terry Gilliam, David Ginola, Sean Hughes, Liz Hurley, Samantha Janus, Ulrika Jonsson, Mark Lamarr, Simon Le Bon, Yasmin Le Bon, Matt Lucas, Lulu, Meg Matthews, Martine McCutcheon, Tim McInnerny, Paul Nicholls, Neil Pearson, Anne Robinson, Colin Salmon, Imelda Staunton, Mark Thomas, Ramon Tikaram, Stephen Tompkinson, and Gianluca Vialli.

Live From The Lighthouse was the third charity fundraiser to be produced by Pozzitive Television, following on from Filth! in 1994 and The Big Snog in 1995.
