= The Big Snog =

British charity telethon

The Big Snog was a charity telethon raising money for The Hysteria Trust, which aired on Channel 4 on World AIDS Day in 1995. It was hosted by Steve Coogan as Alan Partridge, Jenny Eclair, Dale Winton, and Lenny Henry.

The full lineup also included Harry Enfield, Phil Kay, Jeremy Hardy, Rich Hall, Jimeoin, Lee Evans, The Pretenders, Alan Davies, Charlie Higson, Paul Whitehouse, Julian Clary, Nick Hancock, Kate Robbins, Tony Hawks, Nicholas Parsons, Hugh Dennis, Ann Bryson, Annabel Giles, John Thomson, Eddie Izzard, and Hugh Laurie.

The Big Snog was the second charity fundraiser to be produced by Pozzitive Television for World AIDS Day, with Filth! in 1994 and Stephen Fry's 'Live From The Lighthouse' in 1998.
