= Geoff Posner =

British television producer and director (born 1949)

- Born: Geoffrey Harold Posner; 7 July 1949 (age 77)
- Occupations: Television producer, director
- Years active: 1981–present

Geoffrey Harold Posner (born 7 July 1949) is a British television producer and director. Posner has directed and produced some of Britain's most successful comedy shows since the early 1980s.

== Career ==
Starting off as a director on the satirical show Not the Nine O'Clock News, he also directed Revolting Women for BBC Manchester in 1981, a sketch show featuring amongst others Jeni Barnett and Linda Broughton, and in 1982 went on to direct the groundbreaking BBC2 anti-sitcom The Young Ones. Working also as an assistant producer on that show, he went on to produce in the same year the unaired pilot of the Rowan Atkinson historical sitcom Blackadder. One of his biggest successes came in 1985, when he produced and directed the multi-award-winning Victoria Wood As Seen On TV, a sketch show written by (and starring) the comedian.

Posner has since produced and directed some of the most popular British television comedies of the 1990s and 2000s. They include Harry Enfield's Television Programme, French & Saunders, Paul Calf's Video Diaries, and dinnerladies. More recently, he was one of the TV directors covering the Live 8 concert. He was also producer of the second and third series of Little Britain.

His shows have won six BAFTA awards and been nominated for another seven.

Posner formed Pozzitive Television with fellow TV producer David Tyler in 1992.

Posner also directed the 1998 Eurovision Song Contest in Birmingham and the Queen's Diamond Jubilee Concert in 2012.

He was awarded an honorary doctorate from the University of Essex in 2016.

== Television productions ==
- Revolting Women, director, episode one, 1981
- Top of the Pops, director, five episodes, 1980-1981
- Not the Nine O'Clock News, director, series 4, 1982
- Blackadder, director, pilot, 1982
- Blankety Blank, director, one episode, 1982
- The Young Ones, director, 1982
- Carrott's Lib, director, 1982 - 1983
- The Lenny Henry Show, director, 1984-1988
- Madness The Pilot, director, TV short, 1984
- Lenny Henry Tonite, director, 1986
- French and Saunders, director, 1987-1988
- The Robbie Coltrane Special, director, 1989
- Victoria Wood: As Seen on TV, director/producer, 1989
- John Sessions' Tall Tales, director, 1991
- Josie, director, 1991
- Paul Merton: The Series, director, 1991
- Harry Enfield's Television Programme, director, 1992
- Victoria Wood's All Day Breakfast, director, 1992
- It's A Mad World, World, World, World, director, 1994
- Paul Calf's Video Diary, director / producer, 1994
- Victoria Wood: Live In Your Own Home, director/ producer, 1994
- A Christmas Night With the Stars, director, 1994
- Pauline Calf's Wedding Video, director/ producer, 1994
- Coogan's Run, director/ producer, 1995
- The Tony Ferrino Phenomenon, director/ producer, 1997
- Harry Enfield and Chums, director/ producer, 1997
- Victoria Wood: Live, director/ producer, 1997
- Eurovision Song Contest 1998, director, 1998
- Stephen Fry's Live From The Lighthouse, director/ producer, 1998
- Steve Coogan: The Man Who Thinks He's It, director/ producer, 1998
- dinnerladies, director/ producer, 1998-2000
- tlc, director/ producer, 2002
- The Prince's Trust 30th Birthday: Live, director/ producer, 2006
- Little Britain series 2 and 3, director/ producer, 2004-2006
- Music Hall Meltdown, director/ producer, 2007
- Giles Wemmbley-Hogg Goes Off... to Glastonbury, director/producer, 2007
- Marcus Brigstocke: Planet Corduroy, director/producer, 2007
- Saturday Live Again, director/ producer, 2007
- Two Pints of Lager and a Packet of Crisps, 'The Aftermath', director, 2009
- Big Top, director/ producer, 2009
- The Angina Monologues, director/ producer, 2010
- The One Ronnie, director/ producer, 2010
- Come Fly With Me, producer, 2010-2011
- The One Griff Rhys Jones, director/ producer, 2012
- Catherine Tate's Nan, director/ producer, 2014-2015
- Victoria Wood: From Soup to Nuts, executive producer, 2018

== Other work ==
Posner also produced and directed a number of live events, including the Opening Ceremony of the London 2012 Olympic Games, the wedding of Prince William and Catherine Middleton, and the Jubilee Gala 2013.

== Notable awards and nominations ==
- Carrott's Lib, BAFTA, Best Light Entertainment Programme - winner, 1984
- Victoria Wood: As Seen on TV, BAFTA, Best Light Entertainment Programme - winner, 1986
- Victoria Wood: As Seen on TV, BAFTA, Best Light Entertainment Programme - winner, 1987 a
- Victoria Wood on TV, BAFTA, Best Light Entertainment Programme - winner, 1988
- French and Saunders, BAFTA, Best Light Entertainment Programme - nominated, 1989
- The Lenny Henry Show, BAFTA, Best Light Entertainment Programme - nominated, 1989
- Harry Enfield's Television Programme, BAFTA, Best Light Entertainment Programme - nominated, 1993
- Pauline Calf's Wedding Video (as Three Fights, Two Weddings, and a Funeral), BAFTA, Best Television Comedy - winner, 1995
- dinnerladies, BAFTA, Television Comedy - nominated, 1999
- Eurovision Song Contest, Best Live Outside Broadcast Coverage - nominated, 1999
- dinnerladies, BAFTA, Situation Comedy - nominated, 2000
