= The Museum of Everything =

- Genre: Comedy
- Country of origin: United Kingdom
- Language: English
- Home station: BBC Radio 4
- Starring: Marcus Brigstocke; Danny Robins; Dan Tetsell; Lucy Montgomery
- Written by: Marcus Brigstocke; Danny Robins; Dan Tetsell
- Produced by: Alex Walsh-Taylor
- No. of series: 3
- No. of episodes: 18
- Website: Official website

The Museum of Everything is a BBC Radio 4 comedy sketch show, written by and starring Marcus Brigstocke, Danny Robins and Dan Tetsell. The programme is based on the trio's earlier live sketch show of the same name, which was performed at the Edinburgh Festival Fringe in 2002. The first series was broadcast in 2004, a second series in 2005 and a third series in 2006. It is set in an English provincial museum - 'the only museum where you can experience the history of everything'. Lucy Montgomery also features. The programme is produced by Alex Walsh-Taylor with music written by Dominic Haslam and Ben Walker.

== Episodes ==
=== Series 1 ===
1. Welcome to the Museum of Everything
2. A Very Important Visitor
3. School Parties Welcome
4. To Infinity and Beyond
5. The History of Everything
6. The History of the Future

=== Series 2 ===
1. The Museum Reopens
2. The Dig
3. Under New Management
4. The Coach Trip
5. By Royal Appointment
6. Behind the Magic

=== Series 3 ===
1. The Museum Reopens
2. Natural Science
3. The Thing
4. And The Winner Is…
5. The Expo
6. Transport
