= British Troll Farm =

BBC Radio show

- Genre: Comedy
- Running time: 28 minutes
- Country of origin: United Kingdom
- Language: English
- Home station: BBC Radio 4
- Starring: Nicola Coughlan; Daniel Ings
- Written by: Jack Bernhardt
- Directed by: David Tyler
- Produced by: David Tyler
- Original release: 11 October 2017
- No. of series: 1
- No. of episodes: 1
- Audio format: Stereophonic sound

British Troll Farm is a radio sitcom written and created by Jack Bernhardt and directed and produced by David Tyler. It is set in a secret British military unit just off the A23, dedicated to fighting the social media cyberwar. Badly.

The pilot was first broadcast on BBC Radio 4 in July 2019 and was well received on social media. The Cambridge Geek gave it 4 stars.

The cast included Nicola Coughlan as Caz, Daniel Ings as Josh, Steve Edge as Phil, Tala Gouveia as Bim, and Ewan Bailey as the narrator.
