= Jack & Millie =

BBC Radio show

- Genre: Comedy
- Running time: 28 minutes
- Country of origin: United Kingdom
- Language: English
- Home station: BBC Radio 4
- Starring: Rebecca Front; Jeremy Front
- Written by: Jeremy Front
- Directed by: David Tyler
- Produced by: David Tyler
- Original release: 23 February 2017
- No. of series: 1
- No. of episodes: 5
- Audio format: Stereophonic sound

Jack & Millie is a radio sitcom written and created by Jeremy Front and directed and produced by David Tyler. It is centred around Jack and Millie, an older couple who are fully engaged with contemporary life while being at war with the absurdities of the modern world. The show stars real life brother and sister Jeremy and Rebecca Front, and is based on two devised characters that the siblings had been improvising for years.

== Episodes ==
No.	Title	Original release date
1	"Kafka Died at 39"	23 February 2017
A phone, a strudel and Franz Kafka combine to make Jack and Millie's day rather complicated. The couple also have to get to grips with a French daughter-in-law, gassy beer, Eye-Closing Leon and a married lifetime's-worth of verbal sparring.
2	"Death and the Maven"	18 July 2018
When Film Club Leo dies suddenly, Jack and Millie have to make a choice between good behaviour and cheesecake.
3	"Special Lunch"	25 July 2018
Jack and Millie have a son. And Melvin has an app. And Melvin's wife Delphine has a dog. And Daniel Craig has both his eyebrows.
4	"Deliver Us From eBay"	1 August 2018
Jack and Millie discover the 11th commandment. Thou shalt not try and please a son's scary ex-girlfriend. And what is really in the mysterious neighbour's packages?
5	"The Kids Are Alright"	8 August 2018
All grandkids make mistakes, but only Jack and Millie's do it quite so loudly - and on video.

== Reception ==
The show was celebrated in the Jewish Chronicle as playing against stereotypes, and The Cambridge Geek praised the pilot episode, giving the series 4 stars and writing that "these two have been putting out good stuff long enough that they get an automatic listen".
