= The Cabaret Upstairs =

British radio comedy program (1986–1988)

The Cabaret Upstairs was a radio comedy programme that was broadcast on BBC Radio 4 from May 1986 to April 1988. There were 18 half-hour episodes, each showcasing a roster of material from 3 comedians or music acts (stretched to 4 or sometimes 5 in the later series). Acts included Clive Anderson, Jo Brand, Jeremy Hardy, Harry Enfield, Punt and Dennis, and it was produced and directed by David Tyler.
