= Jason Hazeley and Joel Morris =

Jason Hazeley and Joel Morris are two comedy writers who have worked together on various projects.

- Jason Hazeley
- Joel Morris
