= Shush! =

2015 radio sitcom

Shush! is a BBC Radio 4 sitcom created, written by and starring Rebecca Front and Morwenna Banks. It follows child prodigy Alice and hapless Snoo as two librarians, trying desperately to keep their local library afloat. The first series was broadcast on BBC Radio 4 in September 2015, with the second series broadcast in May 2017.

The idea was originally developed with Armando Iannucci as a television programme, but was instead commissioned for radio in 2014, with the pilot episode being co-written by Father Ted creator Arthur Mathews. The series also stars Ben Willbond as local library inspector Simon Neilson, and Michael Fenton-Stevens as morally bankrupt celebrity surgeon Dr Cadogan. Guest stars so far have included Geoffrey Whitehead, Frances Barber and Laurence Fox and the show is produced by Pozzitive Television.

== Episode list ==
=== Series one ===
No. overall	No. in series	Title	Original release date
1	1	"Top Shelf"	23 February 2017
Alice and Snoo have to resort to some rather unconventional means to get people into the library. A very low shelf, a book about zombies, a hosepipe ban and some hummingbirds bring the public flocking in.
2	2	"Mobile Library"	18 July 2018
An intruder, an ice-cream van and Daniel Barenboim make life difficult for Snoo and Alice as Simon constructs a deadly cornflakes-based trap.
3	3	"Tome Raider"	25 July 2018
Alice and Snoo have to elicit the help of Alice's father to save Dr Cadogan from disgrace. Meanwhile, Simon's feelings for Alice face an unexpected obstacle.
4	4	"New Romantics"	1 August 2018
A wandering poet, a bottle of Calpol and some Roman bathing techniques cause trouble for Snoo and Alice. And just what is Dr Cadogan's unexpected skill?

=== Series two ===
No. overall	No. in series	Title	Original release date
5	1	TBA	May 2017

== Critical reception ==
Both series of Shush! have so far been very well received. David Hepworth, writing in The Guardian, praised its "lovely" moments, while Jane Anderson, reviewing for the Radio Times, wrote that "any comedy based upon an idea by Armando Iannucci has quality written all over it and this is no exception. Written by Morwenna Banks and Rebecca Front, who both star as socially challenged librarians, this is a rare Radio 4 sitcom grower.".
