= Don FM =

- Don FM logo as designed by Paul Griffin
- England
- Broadcast area: London

Programming
- Format: Breakbeat hardcore, jungle, drum and bass

History
- First air date: November 1992 (Pirate); 28 August 1994 (RSL)
- Former frequencies: 105.7FM / 107.9FM (Pirate); 100.5FM (RSL)

Don FM was a 1990s London pirate radio station, influential in the development of breakbeat hardcore, jungle and drum and bass music. It was the first jungle pirate station granted a temporary legal license.

Don first broadcast in November 1992 on the frequency of 105.7FM from Wandsworth, South West London, broadcasting mostly at the weekend, specialising in breakbeat hardcore and jungle but also playing house and garage on a Sunday. Its popularity grew throughout 1993, with the station promoting rave and club nights, selling merchandise, and distributing a magazine through London's specialist dance record shops.

On 28 March 1994, Don ceased transmission to apply for a Restricted Service Licence. It was awarded this and transmitted legally for 4 weeks from 28 August 1994 on 100.5FM to London, and was the first pirate radio station of its genre to do so. Guest shows from big names in the jungle scene passed through including Bryan Gee (V Recordings), Ray Keith, and Stevie Hyper D.

Don FM then returned as a pirate on the frequency of 107.9FM in September 1995 and ran until April 1997, broadcasting again at the weekends playing predominantly drum and bass but also house and techno.

Well known DJs, MCs and artists who have appeared on Don include DJ Trace, DJ Twiz, Matt Cantor (The Freestylers), Mark Force (Bugz in the Attic), DJ Dee Kline, MC Hyperactive, Ed Rush, MC Ryme Tyme, DJ Kane, DJ Gunshot, NutE1, DJ Harmony, MC Stevie A, and Asad Rizvi. Record labels and shops also hosted shows on the station including Chemistry Records, Lucky Spin, and Rugged Vinyl.

In an interview with The Quietus, Nicholas Talbot of band Gravenhurst and IDM artist Mike Paradinas recall the station as a "pioneering radio station".
