= Strap In – It's Clever Peter! =

Strap In – It's Clever Peter is the debut radio show by the award-winning sketch group Clever Peter. The first episode premiered on BBC Radio 4 on Wednesday 16 May 2012. It was produced and directed by David Tyler, and starred Richard Bond, Edward Eales-White, William Hartley and special guest Catriona Knox. It was written by Richard Bond, Edward Eales-White, William Hartley and Dominic Stone.

== Episodes ==
The four episodes ("Nigel", "Barry", "Douglas" and "Pedro") were first broadcast on BBC Radio 4 at weekly intervals between 16 May and 6 June 2012.

== Reception ==
Reception to the series was hugely positive, with coverage in The Daily Telegraph, The Times, The Independent, and comedy website Giggle Beats. The Times praised its 'breakneck nonsense and hilarity' and described it as 'a thoroughly entertaining 15 minutes'. Total TV Guide magazine commented, 'Do we really need another madcap male comedy trio? Well, if they're as good as Clever Peter, then yes we do'.

More information on the show can be found both on the BBC Radio webpages and the British Comedy Guide
