= The Late Edition =

- Starring: Marcus Brigstocke

Production
- Running time: 30 minutes

Original release
- Network: BBC Four
- Release: 3 March 2005 – 26 March 2008

The Late Edition is a British television programme broadcast on BBC Four. It takes the form of a weekly topical chat show in the vein of The Daily Show, presented by comedian Marcus Brigstocke. Each episode typically features comical news commentary from Brigstocke, satirical interviews with fictional political figures played by Steve Furst, 'Andre Vincent investigates' and two "real" interviews.

In 2007, 2008 and 2009, Brigstocke performed a special version of the show at the Edinburgh Fringe called The Early Edition with Andre Vincent.
