= Danny Robins =

English writer

Robins in 2024

Danny Robins is a British comedy writer and performer, broadcaster and journalist.

== Career ==
Robins began his comedy career as a teenager doing stand-up in his home town of Newcastle upon Tyne, where he was friends with Ross Noble, and later at Bristol University as part of the trio "Club Seals" with Marcus Brigstocke and Dan Tetsell. Club Seals' spoof archaeology programme We Are History (BBC Two, 2000) was followed by an adaptation of their Edinburgh Fringe Show The Museum of Everything for BBC Radio 4. The radio sitcom Rudy's Rare Records was written with Tetsell and Lenny Henry and adapted for the stage in 2014. Other comedy writing credits include That Was Then, This Is Now (2004), Armando Iannucci's Gash (2003) and The Basil Brush Show (2007).

The CBBC comedy Young Dracula, also written with Dan Tetsell, ran for five series between 2006 and 2014. A one-off sitcom episode "Monks" was written by Robins for the sixteenth series of the BBC's Comedy Playhouse in 2014. His Radio 4 sitcom The Cold Swedish Winter (2014) was inspired by meeting his Swedish wife, Eva, in 2005, and his subsequent time spent in the country.

Robins' interest in the supernatural has led to him writing and researching several radio series and podcasts on the subject. He created the podcast Haunted for Panoply in 2017. For BBC Radio 4 and BBC Sounds, he wrote and presented The Battersea Poltergeist (2021), followed by Uncanny later in 2021 and The Witch Farm in 2022. His play 2:22 A Ghost Story starring Lily Allen won Best New Play at the 2022 WhatsOnStage Awards. Uncanny launched as a TV series on 13 October 2023 on BBC Two, written and presented by Robins. He was also an executive producer on the series.

A television series created by Robbins, The Witch Farm, based on the podcast of the same name, is expected to broadcast on BBC One in November 2026.

== Personal life ==
Robins lives in Walthamstow, London.

He has two children with his wife Eva, a Swedish native, whom he met in 2005.
