= Coogan's Run =

1995 UK TV series

- Genre: Comedy
- Written by: Steve Coogan; Patrick Marber; David Tyler; Graham Linehan; Arthur Mathews; Geoffrey Perkins; Henry Normal
- Starring: Steve Coogan
- Country of origin: United Kingdom
- Original language: English
- No. of seasons: 1
- No. of episodes: 6

Production
- Producer: David Tyler
- Running time: 27–30 minutes
- Production company: Pozzitive Productions

Original release
- Network: BBC2
- Release: 17 November – 22 December 1995

Coogan's Run is a 1995 British television series featuring Steve Coogan as a series of odd characters living in the fictional town of Ottle. It was written by various people including Coogan, Patrick Marber, David Tyler, Graham Linehan, Arthur Mathews, Geoffrey Perkins and Henry Normal. The series consists of six self-contained stories, although Coogan's characters from the other episodes in the series make occasional cameo appearances.

== Cast ==
- Steve Coogan - Paul Calf / Pauline Calf / Gareth Cheeseman / Ernest Moss / Peter Calf / Mike Crystal / Guy Crump / Tim Fleck / Tony Sword (Voice)
- John Thomson - Robin Moss
- Malcolm Raeburn - Inspector Lynch
- Teresa Banham - Debs
- Adrian Scarborough - Councillor Hillary Crabbe
- Philip Martin Brown - PC Ted Cornwall
- Roger Morlidge - Prison Officer
- Derek Howard - Reverend Dowd
- John Clegg - Alf
- Patrick Marber - Stewart Crump

== Episodes ==
No.	Title	Original release date
1	"Get Calf"	17 November 1995
The opening episode features the already well known characters Paul Calf and his sister Pauline (both played by Coogan). Paul gets into trouble with three criminal brothers after witnessing a bank robbery and being forced to identify them in court. He joins a cult and retreats to their residence where he is lured into a porn film. Written by Steve Coogan and Henry Normal.
2	"Dearth of a Salesman"	24 November 1995
Coogan plays the insensitive, egotistical computer hardware salesman Gareth Cheeseman. With similarities to Coogan's most famous creation, Alan Partridge, Gareth attempts to socialise and make a big sale during a sales conference while constantly checking to see if his car is safe. Despite his faults, Gareth appears destined to land a big contract, but fate intervenes. Written by Graham Linehan and Arthur Mathews (writer).
3	"A Handyman for All Seasons"	1 December 1995
Main character Ernest Moss (Coogan), a general repairman, attempts to stop a large new property development in his home village while making repairs to his fellow villagers' homes. Moss had previously appeared in live shows giving a safety lecture (as seen on the 1994 video release Live 'n' Lewd). Set in 1960 and mostly filmed in black and white, this episode also saw Coogan play the laddish Peter Calf, the father of Paul. Written by Henry Normal and Steve Coogan.
4	"Thursday Night Fever"	8 December 1995
Mediocre club entertainer Mike Crystal (Coogan) invents an alter-ego, Clint Stallone, when his career begins to falter. The manager of his club, Clement (Graham Fellows), thinks Clint is real and gets his nephew to photograph him in a compromising position with Mike's girlfriend, Debs.Written by Graham Linehan, Arthur Mathews (writer) and Geoffrey Perkins.
5	"Natural Born Quizzers"	15 December 1995
The episode features the mad, trivia-obsessive brothers Stewart and Guy Crump (Coogan and Patrick Marber). When the brothers lost a children's quiz show in 1975, they burned down the studio, killing their parents and one of the sisters from the opposing team. 20 years later, the brothers kidnap their therapist and the surviving sister, Cathy (Rebecca Front), and make them re-enact the quiz on the roof of a car park with the now-transgender quiz host, Jeremy (Angela) Monkhead. It ends with Stewart and Guy taking the trophy and then detonating a bomb. Written by Patrick Marber, David Tyler (producer), Steve Coogan and Henry Normal.
6	"The Curator"	22 December 1995
Tim Fleck (Coogan), the curator of a very dull museum, is disgusted to find that his museum is being taken over to build a steak house upon his mother's death. On opening night, a masked man attacks the diners. Written by Patrick Marber.
