= David Tyler (producer) =

British producer, executive producer and director

David Tyler (born 24 June 1961) is a British television and radio comedy producer, executive producer, and director. He is co-founder of the independent production company Pozzitive Television, which he set up in 1992 with Geoff Posner.

== Pozzitive Television ==
Since the founding of Pozzitive Television, Tyler has been responsible for working on various British comedy programmes. The shows that he has worked on have won numerous awards including several BAFTAs, two Golden Roses and a silver Rose d'Or at the Rose d'Or awards in Montreux, seven Sony Awards, and multiple Comedy.co.uk and RTS awards.

His credits include BBC Two sitcom Three Fights, Two Weddings and a Funeral, which won the 1994 BAFTA for Best Comedy (Programme or Series); the BBC Radio 4 stand-up comedy show Jeremy Hardy Speaks to the Nation, which was the first full-fledged comedy show from an independent production company for Radio 4, and won a bronze Sony Award in 1995; Victoria Wood's television sitcom dinnerladies, which won the British Comedy Awards for "Best New Comedy" in 1999 and "Best Comedy" in 2000; Radio 4 sitcom Cabin Pressure which was the first ever radio sitcom to win "Best Comedy" at the BCG awards in 2014. Between 2010 and 2019, David Tyler was nominated for the Radio Production Award for "Best Comedy/Entertainment Producer" eight times, and in 2015 won the coveted "Gold Award".

== Radio Productions ==
- The Cabaret Upstairs, producer/director, 1985.
- The Big Fun Show, producer/director, 1987.
- Dial M For Pizza, producer/director, series 1 and 2, 1987-1988.
- Hey Rrradio, producer/director, pilot, 1988.
- Live on Arrival, producer/director, pilot, 1988.
- Radio Active, producer/director, series 6 and 7, 1986-1987.
- The Woody Allen Reader, producer/director, 1988.
- At Home with the Hardys (also known as Unnatural Acts), producer/director, 1987-1990.
- Jeremy Hardy Speaks to the Nation, producer/director, series 1-9, 1993-2013.
- Crown Jewels, producer/director, series 1 & 2, 1995.
- King Stupid, producer/director, 1998.
- The Very World of Milton Jones, producer/director, series 1-3, 1998-2001.
- The 99p Challenge, producer/director, series 2-5, 2000-2004.
- Giles Wemmbley-Hogg Goes Off, producer/director, series 1-5, 2002-2011.
- The House of Milton Jones, producer/director, 2003.
- Another Case of Milton Jones, producer/director, series 1-5, 2005-2011.
- Armando Iannucci's Charm Offensive, producer/director, series 1-4, 2005-2008.
- Deep Trouble, producer/director, series 1 & 2, 2005-2007.
- The Castle, producer/director, series 1-4, 2007-2012.
- Cabin Pressure, producer/director, series 1-4, 2008-2013.
- The Genuine Particle, producer/director, 2008.
- Bigipedia, producer/director, series 1 & 2, 2009-2011.
- Jo Caulfield Won't Shut Up, producer/director, 2009.
- My First Planet, producer/director, series 1-2, 2014.
- Strap In - It's Clever Peter!, producer/director, series 1, 2012.
- Kevin Eldon Will See You Now, producer/director, series 1-4, 2012-2019.
- The Brig Society, producer/director, series 1-4, 2013-2016
- John Finnemore's Double Acts, producer/director, series 1-2, 2015
- Agendum, producer/director, series 1-2, 2017-2019
- Little Brexit, producer, 2020
- British Troll Farm, producer/director, pilot, 2020
- Shush!, producer/director, series 1-2, 2015-2019
- Extra Life, executive producer, series 1, 2021
- Cold Case Crime Cuts, executive producer, series 1, 2021
- Sound Heap, executive producer, series 1, 2021
- God Squad, producer/director, pilot, 2021
- The 3rd Degree, producer/director, series 1-12, 2010-2022.
- Thanks A Lot, Milton Jones!, producer/director, series 1-5, 2014-2022
- The Hauntening, producer/ director, series 1-4, 2017-2022
- Jack and Millie, producer/director, series 1-3, 2017-2022
- Glenn Moore's Almanac, producer/ director, series 1, 2023

== Television productions ==
- Dead At 30, pilot, producer, 1991.
- Paul Merton: The Series, producer, series 1 and 2, 1991-1993.
- Absolutely, producer, series 4, 1993.
- Introducing Tony Ferrino - Who? And Why? - A Quest, producer, 1993
- The Tony Ferrino Phenomenon, producer, 1993.
- The Imaginatively Titled Punt & Dennis Show, Producer, 1994.
- Pauline Calf's Wedding Video - "Three Fights, Two Weddings & A Funeral", producer, 1994.
- The Marriage Of Figaro, executive producer, 1994
- The Paul Calf Video Diary, producer, 1994.
- Coogan's Run, producer, 1995.
- The End Of The Year Show, producer, 1995.
- Cows, pilot, producer, 1997.
- dinnerladies, series 1 & 2, executive producer, 1998–2000.
- Stephen Fry's 'Live From The Lighthouse', producer, 1998.
- tlc, producer, 2001.
- Gash, producer, 2003.
- The Strategic Humour Initiative, producer, 2003.
- The Comic Side Of 7 Days, producer/director, series 1 & 2, 2004-5.
- Giles Wemmbley Hogg Goes Off… To Glastonbury, producer, 2007.
- Music Hall Meltdown, producer, 2007.
- Saturday Live Again!, producer, 2007.
- For One Night Only, executive producer, 2008.
- Milton Jones Live Universe Tour: Part 1 - Earth, DVD producer, 2009.

== Other work ==
Tyler directed Steve Coogan's national stage tour The Man Who Thinks He's It, in 1998, which also featured Julia Davis and Simon Pegg.

He also produced and directed the audiobook versions of the popular children's book series Mr Gum, by Andy Stanton, for BBC Audio.

- You're a Bad Man, Mr Gum!, 2006.
- Mr Gum & The Biscuit Billionaire, 2010.
- Mr Gum & The Goblins, 2010.

Having worked with Jeremy Hardy for more than 20 years, Tyler co-edited an anthology of Hardy's writing, Jeremy Hardy Speaks Volumes, together with Hardy's widow Katie Barlow. It was published in February 2020, a year after Hardy's death.

== Notable Awards ==
- Radio Production Awards - Best Entertainment Producer - David Tyler - Nominee (2010)
- Radio Production Awards - Best Entertainment Producer - David Tyler - Nominee (2011)
- Radio Production Awards - Best Entertainment Producer - David Tyler - Winner (2013)
- Radio Production Awards - Best Comedy/Entertainment Producer - David Tyler Nominee (2014)
- Radio Production Awards - Best Comedy/Entertainment Producer - David Tyler - Winner (2015)
- Radio Production Awards - Special GOLD Award - David Tyler - Winner (2015)
- Audio Production Awards - Best Comedy Producer - David Tyler - Winner (Bronze, 2017)
- Audio Production Awards - Gethin Thomas Award for Best Comedy Producer - David Tyler - Nominee (2018)
- Audio Production Awards - Gethin Thomas Award for Best Comedy Producer - David Tyler - Nominee (2019)
- Audio Production Awards - Gethin Thomas Award for Best Comedy Producer - David Tyler - Winner (Bronze, 2022)
