= Dan Tetsell =

English comedian

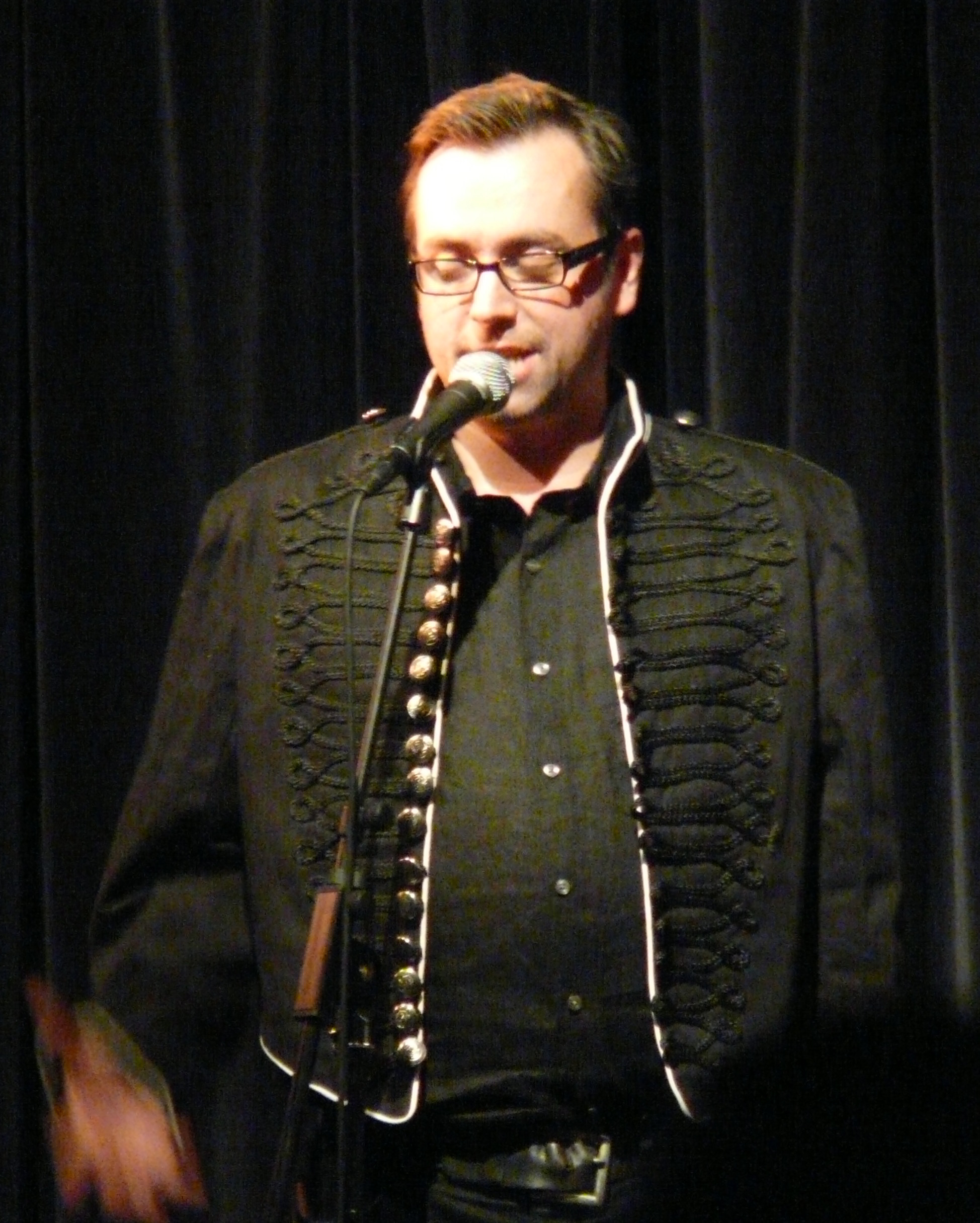
Dan Tetsell during the final performance of As It Occurs To Me in 2011

Dan Tetsell (born 2 July 1974) is a British actor, comedian and writer for radio, television and stage. He has worked on a number of projects, including The Museum of Everything, That Was Then, This Is Now, Newsjack and Parsons and Naylor's Pull-Out Sections. Notably, he created CBBC series Young Dracula with Museum of Everything colleague Danny Robins. He is married to comedy actor Margaret Cabourn-Smith.

At the 2005 Edinburgh Festival Fringe, he performed a one-man comedy show entitled Sins of the Grandfathers, focusing on his grandfather's Nazi past.

Notable TV roles include Brian in the BBC Two situation comedy Lab Rats and the voice of the cat Marion in the BBC Three adult puppet comedy Mongrels. He has appeared in episodes of the BBC TV comedies Miranda and Psychoville.

He starred alongside Richard Herring, Emma Kennedy, and Christian Reilly on Richard Herring's weekly podcast, As It Occurs To Me.

In 2012 he joined British soap Hollyoaks, playing new regular "cunning" solicitor Jim McGinn; he made his first appearance on 30 November. His character was killed by Fraser Black (Jesse Birdsall) in January 2014.

== Filmography ==
Year	Title	Role	Notes
1998	Barking	Various roles	4 episodes
2000–01	We Are History	Keiron	12 episodes
2005	Buried Alive		
2007	Hyperdrive	Robot 1	1 episode
2007	After You've Gone	Fairground Barker	1 episode
2007	Extras	Extra	1 episode
2008	Lab Rats	Brian Lalumaca	6 episodes
2009	The Omid Djalili Show	Himself	1 episode
2009	Miranda	Naval Interviewer	1 episode
2010	Five Daughters	Journalist	2 episodes
2010	The Old Guys	Senior Consultant	1 episode
2010	Vexed	Graham	1 episode
2010	The Increasingly Poor Decisions of Todd Margaret	Paramedic	1 episode
2010	Hotel Trubble	False Vicar	1 episode
2010–2011	Mongrels	Marion (voice)	Entire show
2011	Psychoville	Photographer	1 episode
2012	Skins	Smithy	1 episode
2012	Starlings	Arthur	1 episode
2012	Peep Show	Robert Grayson	3 episodes
2012–14	Hollyoaks	Jim McGinn	111 episode
2013	Utopia	Headteacher	2 episodes
2013	The Mimic	Chris Stubbs / Chris Potts	3 episodes
2015	Humans	Synth Salesman	1 episode
2016	Red Dwarf XI	Colonel Jim Green	1 episode
2017	Not Going Out	Channel Ferries employee	1 episode
2018	Upstart Crow	Edward de Vere, 17th Earl of Oxford	1 episode
2020	Truth Seekers	Paul White	1 episode
2021	The Nevers	Phone Line Engineer	1 episode
2021	Sliced	Geoff	1 episode
2021	Hitmen	Mascot	1 episode
2021	The Toys That Built America	Elliot Handler	2 episodes
2021	Hansel & Gretel: After Ever After	Dad	
