= Marcus Brigstocke =

English comedian and actor (born 1973)

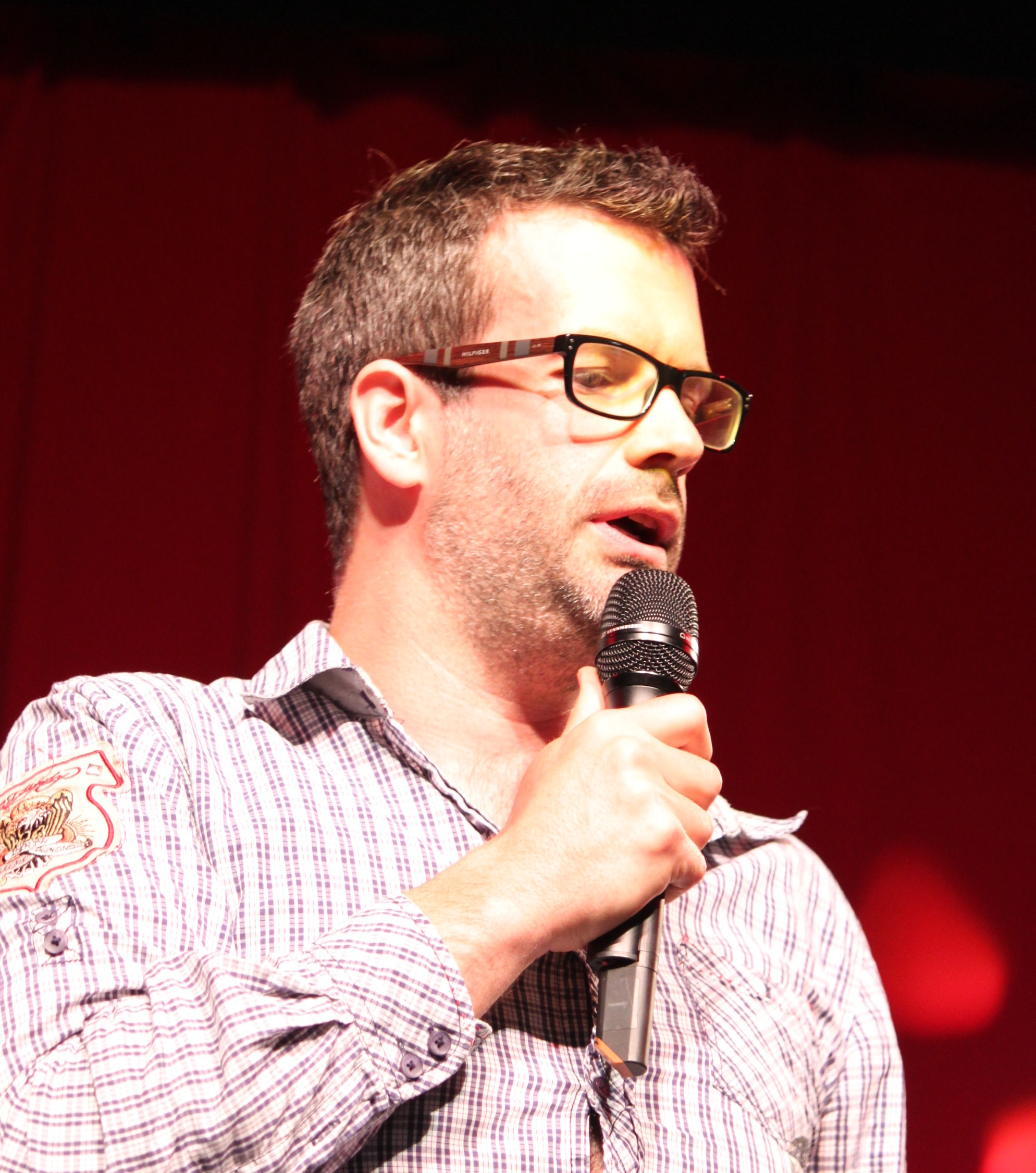
- Brigstocke in 2015
- Born: Marcus Alexander Owen Brigstocke; 8 May 1973 (age 53); Guildford, England
- Education: University of Bristol
- Occupations: Comedian, actor
- Notable work: Argumental; The Now Show
- Spouses: Sophie Prideaux (m. 2001; div. 2013) Rachel Parris (m. 2019)
- Children: 3

Comedy career
- Medium: Television, radio, stand up
- Subject: Politics

Marcus Alexander Owen Brigstocke (born 8 May 1973) is a British comedian and actor. He has worked in stand-up comedy, television, radio and musical theatre. He has appeared on many BBC television and radio shows.

== Early life ==
Brigstocke is the son of Nick Brigstocke, a stockbroker from a Welsh landed gentry family, and Carol, daughter of senior Royal Air Force officer Air Marshal Sir Walter Pretty. He has a sister and brother. He lived in Elstead, Surrey, until he was six and then moved to Haslemere, and was educated at St Edmunds School in the village of Hindhead in Surrey, at Westbourne House School in Chichester, West Sussex, King's School, Bruton in Somerset, and Hammersmith & Fulham College in west London. He then attended the University of Bristol, where he studied drama, but did not complete his degree.

In his youth, Brigstocke struggled with alcohol and drug addiction.

Aged 19, Brigstocke worked on a North Sea oil rig, and later as a podium dancer (being featured on Electric Circus); he used his earnings to travel, and the experiences as inspiration for a stand-up routine. Brigstocke is also a World Cheese Judge and an Academy of Cheese alumnus.

== Live comedy career ==
Many of the central themes of Brigstocke's work were first addressed during his time as a student at the University of Bristol. While at Bristol he often performed in the comedy trio Club Seals (with Dan Tetsell and Danny Robins), which later made the transition to television in the series of short programmes We Are History (2000–2001).

Brigstocke's first stand-up comedy DVD, Planet Corduroy, was released in November 2007.

In April 2008, Brigstocke and fellow comedian and snowboarder Andrew Maxwell founded a comedy and music festival in the ski resort of Meribel, in the French Alps.

In 2009, Brigstocke starred in the British tour of the American live improvisation show Totally Looped. His second stand-up show, God Collar, toured in 2009.

In June 2010, he announced that he had signed a publishing deal with Transworld to turn the God Collar Tour into a book, which was released in 2011 to mixed reviews.

In 2023, he was the comedy headliner of the May ball at Queens' College, Cambridge.

== Radio work ==
Brigstocke has a radio career including The Now Show (1998–2024, with Steve Punt and Hugh Dennis) and Giles Wemmbley-Hogg Goes Off (2002–2011).

On 9 April 2006, Brigstocke appeared as Bertie Wooster in BBC Radio 4's adaptation of The Code of the Woosters (1938), with Andrew Sachs as Jeeves. Brigstocke hosted The Late Edition (2005–2008), which was promoted by the BBC as "Newsnight with jokes".

Brigstocke has hosted a talk show, I've Never Seen Star Wars, on BBC Radio 4 since 2008, transferring it to TV for one series as I've Never Seen Star Wars for BBC Four in 2009.

From 2013 to 2015, he hosted The Brig Society on BBC Radio 4.

In September 2017, BBC Radio 4 broadcast his first serious drama, The Red, drawing on his own experience of recovery. It won the Best Single Drama award in the BBC Audio Drama Awards 2018.

In December 2017, BBC Radio 4 broadcast his new 4-part sitcom, The Wilsons Save The World, in which Brigstocke plays a father leading a family trying to live ethically. A second 4-part series followed in 2019.

=== Other radio credits ===
- Just a Minute
- I'm Sorry I Haven't a Clue
- Giles Wemmbley-Hogg Goes Off
- Think the Unthinkable
- The Museum of Everything
- The 99p Challenge
- The Unbelievable Truth

== Film and television ==
Brigstocke plays an arts journalist named Marcus in the Neil Gaiman film A Short Film About John Bolton (2003) and a radio DJ in the Richard Curtis film Love Actually (2003) and its sequel Red Nose Day Actually (2017).

Brigstocke's television work has included Have I Got News for You and Live at the Apollo. He took part in the BBC Two programme Excuse My French (2006) with Ron Atkinson and Esther Rantzen. They were immersed in the French language by staying in a French town in Provence. Brigstocke's ultimate assignment was to perform a live stand-up comedy act in French to a French audience.

In September 2008, Brigstocke was a team captain for the first series of a comedy panel show, Argumental (2008–2012), for the British television channel Dave. He was the captain of the Red Team, competing against Rufus Hound with a variety of guest participants, under the chairmanship of John Sergeant.

He has also worked for television shows aimed at children for CBBC: Stupid! (2004–2007) and Sorry, I've Got No Head (2008–2011).

Brigstocke appeared in the first series of The Jump in 2014. He reached the final, but had to withdraw when he snapped his cruciate ligaments, an injury that prevented him working for a year.

In the year 2000, he successfully claimed publishing rights after a sample of his voice was used in the song "I Don't Smoke" by DJ Dee Kline.

=== Other television credits ===
- The Savages
- We Are History
- The Late Edition
- My Hero
- Have I Got News for You
- News Knight with Sir Trevor McDonald
- Thank God You're Here
- QI
- Hole in the Wall
- I've Never Seen Star Wars
- Would I Lie to You?
- The Graham Norton Show
- Steph's Packed Lunch
- Live at the Apollo
- The Blame Game
- The Jump
- Famous and Fighting Crime
- Shaun the Sheep: The Flight Before Christmas

=== Other film credits ===
- Love Actually
- Red Nose Day Actually
- Blinded by the Light

== Theatre ==
In 2010, Brigstocke made his musical theatre debut as King Arthur in the British tour of Spamalot for a limited engagement. He then starred in The Railway Children as Albert Perks at the Waterloo Station Theatre in 2011. He appeared in the role of Ali Hakim at two semi-staged concert performances of Oklahoma! at the Proms with the John Wilson Orchestra on 11 August 2017.

In late 2017, Brigstocke played the title role in a revival of Barnum at the Menier Chocolate Factory. For this, he acquired specialist circus skills including magic and walking a tightrope. He chronicled his motivation and progress in an article for The Guardian.

In 2019, Brigstocke adapted his radio play The Red into a theatrical play staged at Pleasance Dome, Edinburgh. It was later adapted into an online version released during 2022.

== Personal life ==
In 2001, Brigstocke married film-maker Sophie Prideaux, daughter of John Prideaux, former chairman of Union Railways;. they have a son and a daughter. They divorced in 2013 following his affair with Hayley Tamaddon with whom he co-starred in the musical Spamalot in 2010. In an interview with The i Paper, Brigstocke revealed that his porn addiction led to him having an affair and said "The things I was into sexually were altered by what I was seeing. I won't go into specifics but it taught me there is so much elasticity in our sexuality." Since April 2018, he has been in a relationship with fellow comedian Rachel Parris. They were engaged on 25 December 2018 and married on 14 September 2019 at Battersea Arts Centre. Their son was born in August 2021. They live in Balham, South London.

Brigstocke established a stand-up tour in the Alps and a comedy festival called The Altitude Festival. He has performed in beatboxing battles on stage with Shlomo and Bellatrix.
