= Jo Caulfield =

British comedian

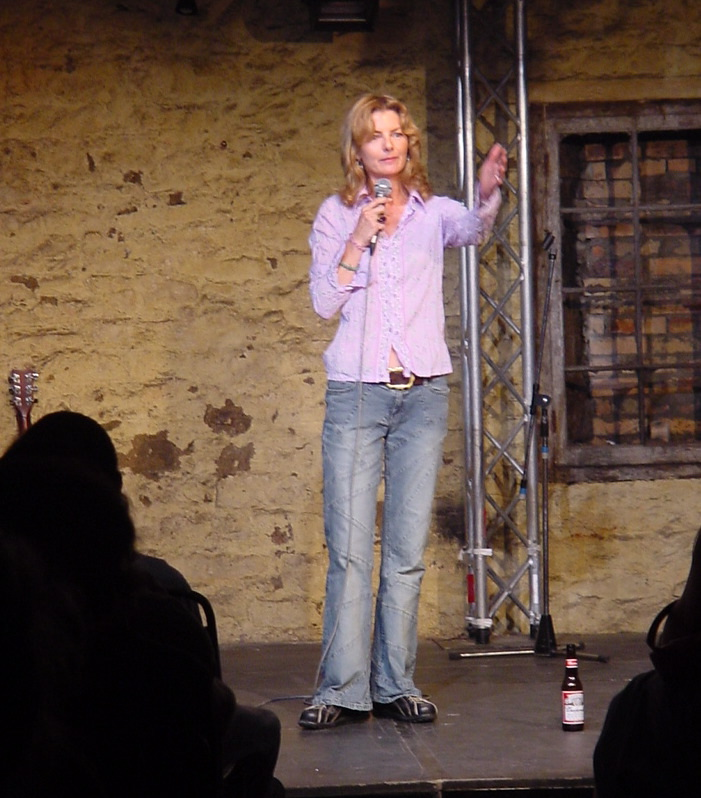
- Caulfield at The Late Show (2002)
- Born: Josephine Caulfield; 26 September 1963 (age 63); St Asaph, Flintshire, Wales

Comedy career
- Medium: Stand-up, television, radio
- Website: www.jocaulfield.com

Jo Caulfield (born 26 September 1963) is a Welsh stand-up comedian, comedy writer, and author. She was joint winner of the 2021 Comedians' Comedian of the Year, an award voted for by her peers and members of the comedy industry.

== Early life ==
Caulfield's parents are both from Northern Ireland. She was born in St Asaph, North Wales while her father, who was an English teacher in the Royal Air Force, was stationed there. She has an older sister and an older brother. According to Caulfield, the family never went anywhere abroad, but moved every two years, "mostly up and down the east coast of England."

Caulfield moved to London aged 17, and wound up living in a squat. "They gave me this box room at the top of the house. It was Dickensian. It was a really cold winter, and there was ice and a hole in my window – but you're young and you don't really care," she told The Scotsman.

Deciding she wanted to get into comedy, Caulfield worked as a waitress during the day, saved up her tips, bought a small microphone and amplifier, and opened her own comedy club. She and her partner agreed a two-year plan to either make it or give up. Caulfield was soon writing for Graham Norton, getting her own gigs and doing a BBC Radio 4 show.

== Career ==
In 2018 she won the "SGFringe Stand-Up Comedy Award" at the Edinburgh Fringe and gained critical acclaim for her performance as Helena Brandt in the sell-out Fringe run of the play, Brexit.

Behind the scenes, Caulfield is a respected comedy writer, having served as a writer / programme consultant on all five series of Graham Norton's BAFTA Award-winning So Graham Norton and as head writer on both Ruby Wax's The Waiting Game and Zoe Ball's Strictly Dance Fever. She has also written for – among others – Joan Rivers, Ant & Dec and Anne Robinson, and has been a regular warm-up comic on Have I Got News for You.

Jo has had several of her own shows on BBC Radio 4: It's That Jo Caulfield Again, Jo Caulfield Won't Shut Up, Jo Caulfield's Speakeasy and The Jo Caulfield Stand-Up Special.

She has been a panellist on comedy panel shows like Mock the Week on BBC Two and Breaking the News on BBC Radio Scotland.

Caulfield has been a guest on the sports programmes Fighting Talk on BBC Radio 5 Live and Off the Ball on BBC Radio Scotland. She has also appeared on BBC Scotland's Debate Night and is a regular guest on Times Radio, giving her take on the news and political events.

== Personal life ==
Caulfield's husband, Stuart, is from Aberdeen. They live in Leith, Edinburgh.
