= 28 Acts in 28 Minutes =

- Genre: Comedy
- Directed by: Richard Valentine
- Starring: Stephen Amos; Dan Antopolski; John Bishop; Jason Byrne; Des Clarke; Nina Conti; Misha Crosby; Rob Deering; Neil Edmond; Justin Edwards; Kevin Eldon; Jocelyn Jee Eisen; Stephen Evans; Simon Farnaby; Jim Field Smith
- Country of origin: United Kingdom
- Original language: English
- No. of episodes: 2

Production
- Running time: 56 minutes
- Production company: BBC

Original release
- Release: 15 February 2005

28 Acts in 28 Minutes is a stand-up TV comedy show aired on the UK's BBC Three in 2005. It comprises 28 acts, each given a minute to perform. Two episodes were aired.

A 3-part series also aired on BBC Radio 4 in June 2006, chaired by John Humphrys.

== List of acts (BBC Three) ==
=== Show One ===
- Jason Byrne
- Noel Fielding
- Neil Mullarkey
- Jocelyn Jee Esien
- James Rawlings, Neil Edmond and Justin Edwards of The Consultants
- Andrew Maxwell
- Tina C
- Matt Blaize
- Milton Jones
- Stickmen
- Glenn Wool
- Ben Willbond
- Dan Antopolski
- Shazia Mirza
- Pete Dobbing
- Trevor & Simon
- Andrew Lawrence
- Paul Foot
- Population 3
- Robin Ince
- Little Howard
- Tony Law
- Oram & Meeten
- Merriman Weir
- Abigail Williams
- Men in Coats
- Mike Wilmot
- Swizzleshaker

=== Show Two ===
- Phil Nichol
- Stephen K Amos
- Nina Conti
- John Oliver
- Stephen Evans, Renton Skinner, Jim Field Smith, Jordan Long, and Rufus Jones of Dutch Elm Conservatoire
- John Bishop
- Gary Le Strange
- Des Clarke
- Simon Farnaby
- The Bearded Ladies
- Simon Munnery
- Rob Deering
- Mark Watson
- Naomi Grigg
- Dara Ó Briain
- Kevin Eldon
- Topping & Butch
- Ava Vidal
- Hopkins & Tunley
- Bad Play
- Count Arthur Strong
- Brendon Burns
- Castratos
- Lizzie Roper
- Carey Marx
- Kirk & Messingham
- Craig Campbell
- Mundo Jazz

== List of acts (BBC Radio 4) ==
=== 21 June 2006 ===
- Richie Webb and Vicki Pepperdine with The One-Minute Musical
- Jason Manford
- Steve Punt and Hugh Dennis
- Josie Long
- Ed Byrne
- Matt Holt
- Nick Mohammed
- Phil Nichol
- Matt Kirshen
- Lemn Sissay
- Tim Key, Tom Basden, Lloyd Woolf, Stefan Golazewski of Cowards, joined by Alex Horne
- Jason John Whitehead
- Howard Read
- Janey Godley
- Count Arthur Strong
- Al Pitcher
- Martin White
- Edward Aczel
- Markus Birdman
- Tom Price
- John Bishop
- Neil Edmond, Justin Edwards, and James Rawlings of The Consultants
- Sue Vale
- Miles Jupp
- Stefano Paolini
- Rhod Gilbert
- Seymour Mace
- Nicholas Parsons

=== 28 June 2006 ===
- Justin Edwards
- Alfie Joey
- Dan Mersh, Jeremy Limb, Paul Litchfield of The Trap
- Jo Enright
- Dave Johns
- Jim Jefferies
- Joanna Neary
- Danny Robins (aka DJ Danny)
- Scott Capurro
- Roger McGough
- John Warburton and Toby Hadoke of The Unbroadcastable Radio Show.
- Martin Bigpig
- Gary Le Strange
- Debra-Jane Appleby
- James Bachman (aka Papa Christmas)
- Steve Hughes
- Dan Antopolski
- Sarah Millican
- Patrick Monahan
- Michael Redmond
- Alun Cochrane
- Greg Davies (playing Michelle), Steve Hall (Derek Upon-Tweed) and Marek Larwood (Jacques) of We Are Klang.
- Jayne Tunnicliffe
- Glenn Wool
- Kevin Day
- Adam Bloom
- Richard Herring
- Garry Morris, Martin Pemberton, Steve Royle and Andrew Willson of Slaughterhouse Live

=== 5 July 2006 ===
- Kit and The Widow
- Frankie Boyle
- The Hollow Men
- Lucy Porter
- Rob Rouse
- Toby Foster
- Mrs Barbara Nice
- Rob Deering
- Neil Edmond
- Pavel
- Anna Crilly & Katy Wix of Penny Spubb's Party
- Mick Ferry
- Pete Gold
- Susan Murray
- Charlie Chuck
- Jarred Christmas
- Marcus Cummings
- Tom Allen
- Justin Moorhouse
- Wil Hodgson
- Stephen Carlin
- Oram & Meeten
- Isy Suttie
- Alex Horne
- Phil Kay
- Nick Revell
- John Hegley
- Marcus Brigstocke and Danny Robins of The Museum of Everything

=== 25 August 2006 (Edinburgh Festival Special) ===
- Grace Clarke (piper)
- David O'Doherty
- Alan Parker
- Jimeoin
- Laurence Howarth & Gus Brown
- Tim Minchin
- Kevin McAleer
- Andrew Lawrence
- Colin and Fergus
- Peter Buckley Hill
- Fred MacAulay
- Rhys Darby
- Maria Bamford
- Three Mo' Tenors
- Henrik Elmer
- Brendon Burns
- God's Pottery
- Paul Provenza
- Bad Play
- Luke Roberts
- (Lorna) Watson and (Ingrid) Oliver
- Nick Doody
- Jason Wood
- Tim Key
- Robin Ince (and Martin White)
- Jason Byrne
- The Kransky Sisters
- Adam Hills
- Barry Cryer and Ronnie Golden

== Series 2 schedule - List of acts (BBC Radio 4) ==
=== Episode 1: Thurs 20 December 2007, 6.30pm ===
- Jeremy Limb
- Des Clarke
- Penny Broadhurst
- Arnab Chanda
- John Sessions
- Christina Martin
- Gavin Osborn
- Aaron Counter
- Goldsmith & Hutchinson
- James Kettle
- Paula Wilcox
- James Branch
- Pegabovine
- Dave Cohen
- Jarlath Regan
- Dutch Elm Conservatoire
- Jeff Innocent
- Katherine Jakeways
- Carl Donnelly
- Stephen Grant
- Mara Carlyle
- Stephen K Amos
- Barry Davies
- Jeff Green
- Shappi Khorsandi
- Martin Jarvis
- The Puppini Sisters
- Stewart Lee

=== Episode 2: Thurs 3 January 2008, 6.30pm ===
- Arthur Smith
- Kathryn Williams
- Natalie Haynes
- Murray Lachlan Young
- Dave Fulton
- Kevin Eldon
- Paul Sinha
- Fat Tongue
- Mick Miller
- I Am Kloot
- Phil Hammond
- Pappy's Fun Club
- FiveLive
- Dan Evans
- Faultless & Torrance
- Joe Wilkinson
- Joolz Denby
- Paul Kerensa
- Philip Pope
- Carrie Quinlan
- Lizzie Roper
- Mark Maier
- Hils Barker
- Pros From Dover
- Andy Zaltzman
- Andrew Sachs
- Jimmy Cricket
- Marcus Brigstocke

=== Episode 3: Thurs 27 March 2008, 6.30pm ===
- Phil Cornwell
- Francesca Beard
- The Bearded Ladies
- Matt Morrisroe
- James Sherwood
- Jon Richardson
- Tom McRae
- Geoff McGivern
- Liam Mullone
- Danielle Ward
- John Finnemore
- Greedy
- Ian Stone
- Gwyneth Herbert
- Godliman & Lane
- Lee Bannard
- Simon Jones
- Terry Saunders
- Ginger and Black
- Simon Evans
- Nathan Penlington
- Sir Tim Fitzhigham
- Lady Carol of the Moon
- Alex Lowe
- Luke & Nadia
- Will Smith
- Neil Innes
- Ford & Arthur

== Reception ==
Martin Hoyle of the Financial Times wrote that 28 Acts in 28 Minutes "still keeps you on your toes, like most of the comics with their statutory 60 seconds, and the success rate is high enough to be fun". The Observer's Miranda Sawyer said the show enforced "ruthless discipline" through the short duration of performances. She praised "Ed Byrne's rapid-fire dissection of Back to the Future [as] excellent" and liked "Jason John Whitehead's straightforwardly hilarious stand-up". The same publication's Stephanie Billen thought that "the format defeats some but suits others including Howard Read who comes up with a deliciously sick lullaby". The Irish Times reviewer Bernice Harrison called the show a"a brilliant drivetime option".
