= Tilusha Ghelani =

British radio and TV comedy producer

- Education: Birmingham City University
- Occupation: Producer

Tilusha Ghelani is a British radio and TV comedy producer. She joined the BBC in 2002 as a producer in Radio Light Entertainment. She produced the TV series Nurse starring Paul Whitehouse, and now works on the BBC Comedy commissioning team. Ghelani served as a judge for the 2003 Perrier Comedy Award.

== Filmography ==
Programmes she has produced and/or directed include:

- Spanking New on 7 (BBC 7, 2003/4)
- Talking Comedy (BBC Radio 2, 2003)
- Keeping Up Appearances in India, a documentary for Radio 4 (18 July 2004) about the remaking of the BBC Television sitcom Keeping Up Appearances in Hindi for the STAR Network in India
- Chain Reaction (BBC Radio 4, 2005–2007)
- Quote... Unquote (BBC Radio 4, 2005–2006)
- Life in London, a dramatisation of Pierce Egan's comic novel (BBC Radio 4, 2006)
- 4 Stands Up (BBC Radio 4, 2007–2008)
- Knocker (BBC 7, 2007)
- Gus Murdoch's Sacred Cows (BBC 7, 2007)
- Will Smith Presents the Tao of Bergerac (BBC Radio 4, 2007)
- Alan Carr & Friends at the Fringe (BBC Radio 4, 2007)
- Out to Lunch Special – The Dan Antopolski Radio Show (BBC Radio 2, 2007)
- Just a Minute (BBC Radio 4, 2007–14)
- Wil Hodgson: Straight Outta Chippenham (pilot; BBC Radio 4, 2008)
- Sean Lock and Friends at the Fringe (BBC Radio 2, 2008)
- Will Smith's Midlife Crisis Management (BBC Radio 4, 2008-9)
- Beauty of Britain (BBC Radio 4, 2009)
- Micky Flanagan: What Chance Change? (BBC Radio 4, 2009)
- Newsjack (BBC Radio 4 Extra, 2009- 2011)
- Mr and Mrs Smith (BBC Radio 4, 2012)
- Just a Minute (BBC Two, 2013)
- Simon Evans Goes to Market (BBC Radio 4, 2014)
- Nurse (BBC Radio 4, 2013 and 2016 )
- Nurse (BBC Two), 2015)
