= Saikat =

Saikat (Bengali: সৈকত) is a male given name meaning (sea) shore, beach or bank. It may refer to:

- Saikat (umpire) or Sharfuddoula Ibne Shahid (born 1976), Bangladeshi cricketer and international cricket umpire
- Saikat Ahamed, English actor
- Saikat Ali (cricketer, born 1991), Bangladeshi cricketer
- Saikat Chakrabarti, American political advisor, activist and software engineer
