= Buy Me Up TV =

BBC Radio 2 sitcom

- Genre: Situation comedy
- Running time: 30 minutes
- Country of origin: United Kingdom
- Language: English
- Home station: BBC Radio 2
- Starring: Justin Edwards; Katherine Jakeways; Alex MacQueen; Greg Proops; Ewen MacIntosh; Colin Hoult
- Written by: James Eldred; Justin Edwards
- Produced by: Lucy Armitage
- Original release: 19 May 2007 – 29 March 2008
- No. of episodes: 5
- Audio format: Stereophonic sound
- Website: Buy Me Up TV at BBC Radio 4 Extra

Buy Me Up TV is a BBC Radio 2 sitcom set behind the scenes of a 24-hour shopping channel. It was written by James Eldred and Justin Edwards. A pilot episode was broadcast in March 2007, with a further four episodes following in March 2008. It starred Justin Edwards, Katherine Jakeways, Alex MacQueen, Greg Proops, Ewen MacIntosh and Colin Hoult.

== Cast ==
- Justin Edwards as Bob Norton
- Katherine Jakeways as Angela Bassett
- Alex MacQueen as Giles
- Greg Proops as Jacky Tanner
- Ewen MacIntosh as Ewen
- Colin Hoult as Various

== Plot ==
Set in the studios of 24-hour shopping channel Buy Me Up TV, the programme covers the lives of the unhinged personalities selling all kinds of products in the badly run television station.

== Episodes ==
=== Pilot ===
No.	Title	Original release date
1	"Pilot"	19 May 2007
Owned by a vast American cable network, Buy Me Up TV is a 24-hour live broadcast channel selling rubbish to the nation. In the back rooms and offices of the channel, the high pressure of live broadcast meets the high pressure of sales. Amongst the egos, tantrums, disasters and jealousies, the characters are swimming for their lives in a sales-driven pressure cooker. Then, suddenly, it's "Lights, Camera, Action!".

=== Series one ===
No. overall	No. in series	Title	Original release date
2	1	Episode One	8 March 2008
The TV station organises a charity telethon for animals, with Ewen from The Office in the loos taking the calls. However, guest presenter Eamonn Holmes is a spanner in the works. It soon emerges that not only is the seemingly reliable GMTV presenter happy to defraud charity appeals, he once cheated on Celebrity Ready Steady Cook too.
3	2	Episode Two	15 March 2008
Tanner, who appears to have become addicted to jam, hires Ruth Madoc to join Bob and Angela on the presenting team. However, the Hi-de-Hi! star, who it turns out has a hidden evil streak, soon begins to take over the station.
4	3	Episode Three	22 March 2008
Tanner signs the presenting team up to a team-building day. While they are in the woods, self-help guru Trent Beaglemayer takes over the station and sets about his plans for world domination.
5	4	Episode Four	29 March 2008
When Ewen demonstrates a new language translation computer program, a virus is loaded onto the BuyMeUp TV computer system. Soon, customers are receiving kinky adult emails. When Tanner realises the viewers actually like these emails, he sets about giving the station a new raunchier image.

== Reception ==
The show was not well received by the press, but was praised by many listeners to the show.

"Buy Me Up TV, a new sitcom starring and co-written by Justin Edwards, faces a real comedic hurdle. The world it portrays, in this work-based comedy, is that of the cheaper end of the shopping channels. The problem is, those channels are funny enough: crass and camp, and full of phrases you can't quite believe you just heard. When this sitcom focuses on the selling, it does match the real thing for laughs. There is the ludicrousness of the products - a chicken de-boner which 'uses centrifuge'; a knife reputed to be 'so powerful it can turn into a fine mist', and 'Robert Mugabe beach towels' - and the sales team's banal, empty phrases ("they are quite literally amazing"). Off camera, though, it is a patchier affair, in places somewhat hysterical - as opposed to hysterically funny - and all a bit overexcited. There are nods to Larry Sanders, hints of Alan Partridge and faint echoes of Curb Your Enthusiasm. These are not bad precedents, but what this lively new sitcom needs to sell is an identity all of its own."

— Elisabeth Mahoney, The Guardian, 21 May 2007

"Even with Jonathan Ross as a three-hour warm-up man, Buy Me Up TV failed to coax the glimmer of a smile on to my face. The talents of Doon Mackichan couldn't rescue Justin Edwards' and James Eldred's account of life behind the scenes at a 24-hour shopping channel. Perhaps, judging that this setting has been the subject of numerous satires, the authors settled for a frenzied facsimile of life at the consumerist cutting edge. Everyone sounded barking, indeed on the verge of a nervous breakdown, perhaps because they had to cope with dialogue that could apparently only be delivered at ear-shattering volume. The audience laughter was strangely disturbing, as if they had been force fed E numbers before being manacled to their seats."

— Moira Petty, The Stage, 21 May 2007

== Broadcast history ==
Originally broadcast Radio 2, the series has often been repeated on BBC Radio 4 Extra.
