= Tilt (radio) =

British radio sketch show

Tilt is a topical British radio sketch show, written in the week before broadcast, and recorded the night before. The first, six-episode series was broadcast on BBC 7, between 27 March – 1 May 2008, one of their growing number of specially commissioned projects.

It is written by a variety of sketch writers, some of whom (like Carrie Quinlan) are known writers and performers, who have worked on Armando Iannucci's Charm Offensive and other established comedy programmes; others are complete novices, who have submitted their work in answer to an invitation to new writers in the BBC writersroom.

== See also ==
- Newsjack
