= Radio 9 =

Radio 9 may refer to:

- Radio9, a BBC surreal comedy sketch show set in a fictional radio station. Broadcast on BBC Radio 4 between 2003 and 2006
- CKLX-FM, a French language Canadian radio station located in Montreal, Quebec, rebranded as Radio 9 for a short period 2014–2015
- Chinese Radio FM 104.2, an English-language and Chinese-language radio station, broadcasting in Auckland, New Zealand, part of Chinese Voice
