= Chain Reaction (radio programme) =

British radio show

- Genre: Chat show
- Running time: 30 minutes
- Country of origin: United Kingdom
- Language: English
- Home station: BBC Radio 4
- Produced by: Tilusha Ghelani; Sam Bryant (2009); Lianne Coop (2010); Ed Morrish (2011); Carl Cooper (2012-14); Arnab Chanda & Charlie Perkins (2015); Richard Morris (2016/17); Adnan Ahmed (2017)
- Original release: 1991-2 (BBC Radio 5); 2004 (BBC Radio 4)
- Opening theme: "I Do Not Fear Jazz" by Big Strides
- Website: Chain Reaction

Chain Reaction (nicknamed "the tag-team talk show") is a hostless chat show first broadcast on BBC Radio 5 in 1991, and then revived on BBC Radio 4 in 2004. Each week an individual from the world of entertainment selects someone that they would like to interview. This interviewee goes on to be the next week's interviewer.

== Episodes ==
This table has the episodes of Chain Reaction listed in it
No. overall	No. in series	Interviewer	Interviewee	Original release date
1	1	Ralph Steadman	John Cleese	31 December 1991
2	2	John Cleese	William Goldman	1 January 1992
3	3	William Goldman	Ian McKellen	2 January 1992
4	4	Ian McKellen	Glenys Kinnock	3 January 1992
5	1	Glenys Kinnock	Juliet Stevenson	14 September 1992
6	2	Juliet Stevenson	Helen Bamber	15 September 1992
7	3	Helen Bamber	John Sessions	16 September 1992
8	4	John Sessions	Ruby Wax	17 September 1992
9	5	Ruby Wax	Rob Newman	18 September 1992
10	1	Rob Newman	Spike Milligan	2 November 1992
11	2	Spike Milligan	John Wells	3 November 1992
12	3	John Wells	Paul Merton	4 November 1992
13	4	Paul Merton	George Best	5 November 1992
14	5	George Best	Joe Strummer	6 November 1992
15	1	Joe Strummer	unknown	14 December 1992
16	2	Unknown	unknown	15 December 1992
17	3	Unknown	unknown	16 December 1992
18	4	Unknown	unknown	17 December 1992
19	5	Unknown	unknown	18 December 1992
20	1	David Gedge	John Peel	6 August 1993
21	2	John Peel	Ian Rush	13 August 1993
22	3	Ian Rush	Max Boyce	20 August 1993
23	4	Max Boyce	Pete Waterman	27 August 1993
24	5	Pete Waterman	Jimmy Savile	3 September 1993
25	1	Jenny Eclair	Jimmy Carr	30 December 2004
26	2	Jimmy Carr	Matt Lucas	6 January 2005
27	3	Matt Lucas	Johnny Vegas	13 January 2005
28	4	Johnny Vegas	Stewart Lee	20 January 2005
29	5	Stewart Lee	Alan Moore	27 January 2005
30	6	Alan Moore	Brian Eno	3 February 2005
31	1	Jo Brand	Barry Cryer	15 February 2006
32	2	Barry Cryer	Mark Thomas	22 February 2006
33	3	Mark Thomas	Alexei Sayle	1 March 2006
34	4	Alexei Sayle	Lenny Henry	8 March 2006
35	5	Lenny Henry	Bill Bailey	15 March 2006
36	6	Bill Bailey	Simon Pegg	22 March 2006
37	1	Marcus Brigstocke	Clive Anderson	10 January 2007
38	2	Clive Anderson	John Lloyd	17 January 2007
39	3	John Lloyd	Phill Jupitus	24 January 2007
40	4	Phill Jupitus	John Hegley	31 January 2007
41	5	John Hegley	Jack Dee	7 February 2007
42	6	Jack Dee	Jeremy Hardy	14 February 2007
43	1	Catherine Tate	David Tennant	21 February 2008
44	2	David Tennant	Richard Wilson	28 February 2008
45	3	Richard Wilson	Arabella Weir	6 March 2008
46	4	Arabella Weir	Paul Whitehouse	13 March 2008
47	1	Robert Llewellyn	Dave Gorman	2 September 2009
48	2	Dave Gorman	Frank Skinner	TBA
49	3	Frank Skinner	Eddie Izzard	TBA
50	4	Eddie Izzard	Alastair Campbell	TBA
51	5	Alastair Campbell	Alistair McGowan	TBA
52	6	Alistair McGowan	Simon Callow	TBA
53	1	Ronni Ancona	Lee Mack	13 August 2010
54	2	Lee Mack	Adrian Edmondson	TBA
55	3	Adrian Edmondson	Ruby Wax	TBA
56	4	Ruby Wax	Harry Shearer	TBA
57	5	Harry Shearer	Stephen Merchant	TBA
58	6	Stephen Merchant	Jarvis Cocker	TBA
59	1	Rhys Thomas	Simon Day	29 July 2011
60	2	Simon Day	Peter Hook	TBA
61	3	Peter Hook	John Cooper Clarke	TBA
62	4	John Cooper Clarke	Kevin Eldon	TBA
63	5	Kevin Eldon	Mark Steel	TBA
64	6	Mark Steel	Barry Davies	TBA
65	1	Jeremy Front	his sister Rebecca Front	27 July 2012
66	2	Rebecca Front	Chris Addison	TBA
67	3	Chris Addison	Derren Brown	TBA
68	4	Derren Brown	Tim Minchin	TBA
69	5	Tim Minchin	Caitlin Moran	TBA
70	6	Caitlin Moran	Jennifer Saunders	TBA
71	1	Terry Christian	Kevin Bridges	27 December 2013
72	2	Kevin Bridges	Frankie Boyle	TBA
73	3	Frankie Boyle	Grant Morrison	TBA
74	4	Grant Morrison	Neil Innes	TBA
75	5	Neil Innes	Graham Linehan	TBA
76	6	Graham Linehan	Adam Buxton.	TBA
77	1	Adam Buxton	Reece Shearsmith	18 February 2015
78	2	Reece Shearsmith	Bob Mortimer	TBA
79	3	Bob Mortimer	Vic Reeves	TBA
80	4	Vic Reeves	Olivia Colman	TBA
81	5	Olivia Colman	Sharon Horgan	TBA
82	6	Sharon Horgan	Dennis Kelly	TBA
83	1	Ed Byrne	Al Murray	24 February 2016
84	2	Al Murray	Ian Hislop	TBA
85	3	Ian Hislop	Victoria Coren Mitchell	TBA
86	4	Victoria Coren Mitchell	Sandi Toksvig	TBA
87	5	Sandi Toksvig	Roy Hudd	TBA
88	6	Roy Hudd	Alison Steadman	TBA
89	1	Sara Cox	Joe Lycett	13 February 2017
90	2	Joe Lycett	Katherine Ryan	TBA
91	3	Katherine Ryan	Sara Pascoe	TBA
92	4	Sara Pascoe	Harry Hill	TBA
93	5	Harry Hill	Tim Vine	TBA
94	6	Tim Vine	Sir Ken Dodd	TBA
