= Jammin' (radio programme) =

- Genre: Comedy, music
- Running time: 30 mins
- Country of origin: United Kingdom
- Language: English
- Home station: BBC Radio 2
- Hosted by: Rowland Rivron
- Starring: Richard Vranch; Dave Catlin-Birch; Mitch Benn; Steve Brown
- Produced by: Will Saunders; Claire Bartlett
- Original release: 28 July 2001 – 28 January 2008
- No. of series: 8
- Opening theme: Various
- Ending theme: Various

Jammin' is a British musical comedy show on BBC Radio 2 that first broadcast on 28 July 2001. It was presented by Rowland Rivron, who also played the drums. In addition to Rowland, there were two regulars in the band, and two guests - usually one comedian and one musician. The two regulars were usually Dave Catlin-Birch and Steve Brown. When Dave Catlin-Birch is on tour, he was usually replaced by Honka James Roby. Brown replaced original regular Richard Vranch in 2003.

Thus the show usually followed the format:

- Introduction Song in which the regulars and guests are introduced.
- Short interview with the guests, usually playing a snippet from one of their hits or a performance of the first song they ever wrote. This usually turns into an innuendo, and the performance is stopped by Rivron just before it becomes too explicit.
- Feature from one of the regulars (ABBA/Beatles backwards / "Two Songs for the Price of One" / "Beatles per Minute").
- Bass Line: the bassist plays a bass line, and the other member of the band (except Rivron) try to guess from which song it comes.
- Mixing Styles: One guest suggests a musical style, and other a singer/band, and styles are combined, e.g. 'Roll with It' by Oasis in the style of Jerry Lee Lewis. The roles are then reversed, with the other guest performing.
- Party Pieces Guests will perform their musical party piece, or they have to sing one of their well-known songs inserting words suggested by the rest of the band.
- Audience: Members of the audience call out different words and the band have to try to think of songs that include the word, and play a sample of that song.
- Concluding jam drawn from the last of the songs played from the feature above, or in earlier series, "the song we enjoyed playing most today", which could any song performed during the show.
- The programme was punctuated by snippets from a song sung in varying styles (e.g. a cappella, Country and Western, Bob Dylan-esque) as announced at the end of the programme "Jammin' was brought to you in association with...." However, the Autumn 2006 series did not include this information.

== Regulars ==
- Rowland Rivron - host and drummer
- Richard Vranch - keyboards and guitars
- Dave Catlin-Birch - guitar
- Mitch Benn - bass and guitar
- Steve Brown - piano and occasionally guitar
- Guy Pratt - bass guitar

== Guests ==
- Ade Edmondson
- Edwyn Collins
- Hils Barker
- Kate Robbins
- Barbara Dickson
- Christian Reilly
- Kim Wilde
- Phil Nichol (of Corky and the Juice Pigs)
- Miles Hunt (of The Wonder Stuff)
- Mike Peters (of The Alarm)
- Mike Edwards (of Jesus Jones)
- Kevin Eldon
- Justin Edwards
- Jim Diamond
- James Robert Morrison
- Robert Newman
- Boothby Graffoe
- Nick Heyward (of Haircut One Hundred)
- Melanie C
- Mark King (of Level 42)
- Neil Innes
- Jools Holland
- Steve Punt
- Ronnie Golden
- Neil Hannon
- Phill Jupitus
- Chas & Dave
- Rainer Hirsch
- Mike Batt
- Rod Argent
- Hugh Laurie
- Fish
- Beverley Knight
- Tim Vine
- Tony Hawks
- Rob Deering
- Thomas Dolby
- Nik Kershaw
- Rich Hall
- Chris Difford
- Glenn Tilbrook
- Jackie Clune
- Leo Sayer
- Tim Minchin

== Writers ==
- Robin Ince
- Kevin Day
