= Bigipedia =

2009 BBC Comedy sketch show broadcast

- The Bigipedia logo
- Other names: Bigipedia 2.0; βIgiPεðiA
- Genre: Sketch/Spoof Show
- Running time: 28 minutes
- Country of origin: United Kingdom
- Language: English
- Home station: BBC Radio 4
- Starring: Nick Doody; Ewan Bailey; Sam Battersea; Margaret Cabourn-Smith; Neil Edmond; Pippa Evans; Kobna Holdbrook-Smith; Melanie Hudson; Lewis MacLeod; Gareth Tunley
- Created by: Nick Doody
- Written by: Nick Doody; Matt Kirshen; Carey Marx; Sarah Morgan; Margaret Cabourn-Smith; Neil Edmond
- Directed by: David Tyler
- Produced by: David Tyler
- Original release: 23 July 2009 – 2 August 2011
- No. of series: 2
- No. of episodes: 8
- Website: Bigipedia homepage

Bigipedia
Audio sample of Bigipedia season 1, episode 1

Bigipedia (stylised as "βIgiPεðiA") is a comedy sketch show broadcast on BBC Radio 4 that first aired between 23 July and 13 August 2009. A second series of four episodes began on 12 July 2011. The show's storyline revolves around "Bigipedia", a fictional website broadcast on radio and parody of Wikipedia, the online encyclopedia. The series mocks Wikipedia and other aspects of the Internet. The BBC Press Office described the show as "a unique experiment in 'broadwebcasting'". The series was created by co-star Nick Doody, who also co-writes the show with Matt Kirshen and a wider team of writers. It is produced by Pozzitive Productions.

Critics have given Bigipedia positive reviews. The series was marketed by the BBC as "The Sunday Format for the online age", and critics have given Bigipedia favourable comparisons with its predecessor. The quality of the writing has also been praised. However, a few critics have expressed reservations about the way the show is presented. The first series of Bigipedia was made available to purchase as a download from Audible.co.uk from 1 December 2009. The second series was made available on AudioGo from 5 December 2011.

== Plot ==
Bigipedia is a website broadcast on the radio. Like Wikipedia, it contains articles and discussion pages about a range of different subjects, which can be edited by anyone. Among the similarities are articles, discussion pages, disambiguation pages, featured articles, a news section and a "Did you know?" section for new articles. The articles cover a range of fictional celebrities, bands, films, television series, products and a running gag series of articles on anthropomorphic animal characters from Uruguayan safety campaigns.

Bigipedia differs from Wikipedia in some ways. For example, Bigipedia includes puzzles and competitions, sells its own software, has a range of screensavers, and a section for children called Bigikids, which has had different names in the past which have all had to be changed for different reasons. For example, the name changed from Kidipedia "due to a misunderstanding", Hanging at the School Gates "for reasons you may have seen in the news" and Underage Fun "due to a copyright infringement".

Also, while Wikipedia does not have advertising, Bigipedia does and is also sponsored by a fictional wine-like drink called "Chianto" which is referred to as "this horrific drink". The Bigipedia article on Chianto says: "Over the years it has been sold as a hair remover, self-defence spray, hair restorer, and to farmers as a humane way of killing chickens – by putting it into the pig's feed and leaving the gate open. By morning not only were the chickens killed, but often plucked, too."

The first series ended with Bigipedia attempting to take over the world, having crushed a rebellion in the Philippines and feeding nanobots into the heads of anyone listening to the programme. At the start of the second series, Bigipedia acknowledges that the original Bigipedia, dubbed Bigipedia 1.0 suffered from "security and sentient omniscience issues" and apologises for, "the temporary cyber enslavement of 88% of mankind and the forming of a BigiHuman hybrid hivemind centred in the Philippines", in an incident they refer to as "The Glitch". The site has been updated and is now known as Bigipedia 2.0.

The second series begins with reports of a gigantic Chianto slick in the Gulf of Mexico, a parody of the Deepwater Horizon oil spill. At the end of the series, a mix of white and red Chianto in the slick result in the creation of a Chianto "ovum", which hatches at the bottom of the sea as a monstrous party-animal being called the Chianto Leviathan, which makes its way to the Bigipedia servers in Mexico. The Leviathan attempts to gain all the world's knowledge by accessing the system. The programme ends with Bigipedia playing "prerecorded programmes" while they attempt to stop the Leviathan.

== Production ==
The series was originally conceived by Doody, who was working with producer David Tyler on another BBC Radio 4 comedy series, Armando Iannucci's Charm Offensive. Doody attended a meeting where people were discussing new ideas for radio shows, and Kirshen suggested the idea, and both he and Kirshen wrote the full proposal. Radio 4 liked the idea and a pilot was made. Tyler went on to produce and direct Bigipedia.

Doody and Kirshen describe the show as "writing-heavy". Doody said in an interview with the British Comedy Guide: "Compared to most radio shows, it's incredibly dense, material-wise, and very fast-moving. I think Matt and I would like some of it to be even faster, but sometimes people who've heard the pilot say things like, "It's almost too much." I really like that. I like that it's something you kind of need to hear twice to catch everything. When we got the series, I honestly didn't know where we'd come up with the material of the quality we were determined to keep up."

Some of the sketches in Bigipedia are inspired directly by articles on Wikipedia. Kirshen said in the same interview: "There's a 'Bee Whisperer' in Episode 3 that came from clicking the "Random article" link on Wikipedia. I don't remember what the page we got was, but about three logical leaps later we landed on that idea."

It was revealed by Doody on his Doubling Up podcast with Rob Heeney that there was an extended edition of "The Line" sketch, which he broadcast on the show.

== Reception ==
The reviews of Bigipedia have been mainly positive. Before the series began, Scott Matthewman in The Stage compared Bigipedia to The Sunday Format, saying: "Indeed, the comparison even makes it into the BBC's own press notes. Will this version, which takes the mickey out of online communication, deserve the comparison? That's something we'll have to wait and see." Chris Maume in The Independent on Sunday also commented that there are references to Spinal Tap, On the Hour and Brass Eye.

Elisabeth Mahoney in The Guardian said that she liked the Chianto running gag, while Gillian Reynolds from The Daily Telegraph commented positively on Bigipedia saying it was, "the first late-night comedy in ages that has made me laugh, about computers and why I'm scared of them, about vile TV shows and meaningless commercials. Written by Nick Doody and Matt Kirshen, performed with zest by a sparkling cast. Bound to become a cult." Reviewing the second series Elizabeth Day in The Observer described Bigipedia as, "a hilariously mad portrayal of information overload in the computer age."

Clare Heal in the Sunday Express gave a mixed review, saying that while she found it amusing, it was too similar to the Internet saying, "The programme's only failing was that on occasion it was a little to [sic] reminiscent of the real Internet, ie a virtual ocean full of morons willing to shout loudly about things even (or perhaps especially) if they know nothing about them. You wouldn't want more than half an hour of Bigipedia, no matter how amusing it is."

== Episodes ==
=== Series 1 ===
No.	Title	Original release date
1–1	"Episode 1"	23 July 2009
Bigipedia looks at the original and disturbing origins of the song "Teddy Bears' Picnic"; the featured article on "Fragrant Slab", a band most famous for a song that sounds like the Microsoft Windows start up music; Bigikids teaches children how to make fish fingers; and there is an article about the most boring collection of messages in bottles in history.
1–2	"Episode 2"	30 July 2009
This week looks at the featured article about The Line, the greatest TV series ever made; a selection of Bigipedia screensavers including one featuring ducks; a debate on whether an actress is notable enough to get her own article; and a look back at Chianto's politically incorrect adverts of the 1970s. This episode starts with an extract from Fiona Renfrew's Interviews with the Poor Poor Elephant Man.
1–3	"Episode 3"	6 August 2009
Bigipedia receives a collection of personal ads, Bigikids looks at how to be a spy; there is a tutorial about how to make music using Bigiband software; and there is a featured article on "The Bee Whisperer", a Welshman who was the only person to keep bees for their company and not their honey.
1–4	"Episode 4"	13 August 2009
Bigipedia becomes more sinister with its new street mapping service BigiStreetWatch and develops technology in an attempt to take over the world. Also there is a new article about a magician who was best known for his skills in misdirection; and a series of disastrous Uruguayan safety adverts.

=== Series 2 ===
No.	Title	Original release date
2–1	"What's New In Bigipedia 2.0?"	12 July 2011
At last, the long-awaited release of Bigipedia 2.0 – the infallible, ever-present cyberfriend is back! Now with all errors mistake. Bigipedia looks at the history of the confusing educational children's programme Plinky; a singing parasite called the "Segmented pip worm"; and Bigikids covers the subject of fear.
2–2	"The Wisdom of Crowds"	19 July 2011
Bigipedia demonstrates the effectiveness of the wisdom of crowds by having an article written by everyone instead of anyone; we learn about the "Portwick Prison experiment" in which the inmates and wardens switched roles; BigPromise which completely deregulates Bigipedia's advertising policies; and we read the 1908 Bigipedia almanac.
2–3	"BigiBuzz!"	26 July 2011
Bigipedia brings us the social networking website BigiBuzz; we learn about the talent show Britain's Got Butchers and the "Cacophony" – the world's worst stealth bomber; and easily-scared paranormal investigator Felix Richards visits Britain's least haunted stately home.
2–4	"BigiHype!"	2 August 2011
Bigipedia covers the ever growing Chianto slick of the Gulf of Mexico, as the red and white versions mix to create a Chianto ovum. Bigipedia launches BigiHype, a sure-fire way of raising the profile of anything from a new event to an unpopular charity. Bigipedia articles covered include "Pandoratane", the most adhesive substance known to man; and a look at clouds which form the shape of words. Guest starring chess grandmaster Jonathan Tisdall.

== See also ==
- The Sunday Format
- The Harpoon
- Wikiality
- Wikipedia in culture
