= Newsjack (disambiguation) =

Newsjack may refer to:

- Newsjack, a British radio sketch show
- Newsjacking, to gain publicity by "hijacking" a news story
- Newsjacking, to steal newspapers for sale as scrap
