= Saikat Ahamed =

British actor and writer

- সৈকত আহমেদ
- Born: 1970s Surrey, England
- Education: Broadcast journalism
- Occupations: Actor, writer
- Years active: 1999–present
- Spouse: Jenny Ahamed
- Website: saikatahamed.com

Saikat Ahamed (Bengali: সৈকত আহমেদ) is a British actor and writer based in Bristol. He is best known for his role of Vince Arya in Monday Monday.

== Early life ==
Ahamed was born in Surrey and grew up in Birmingham, West Midlands, England in the 1980s.

Ahamed attended King Edward's School in Birmingham, and left in 1992. In 1995, he graduated with a degree in broadcast journalism from Cardiff University. He then studied acting at the London Centre for Theatre Studies. He was twice Gold champion in Ballroom and Latin American dance.

Ahamed mother's, Hashi, grew up in a war torn Barisal, Bangladesh, trained as a doctor and made her way to the United Kingdom to provide an easier life for her children. His father is general practitioner Ahamed's family moved from Bangladesh in 1972 to the UK, where he was born and has lived since.

== Career ==
Since 1999, Ahamed has been an actor working on stage, screen and radio. His work on television and film includes, the regular part of Vince Arya in Monday Monday, East Is East and Trollied.

Ahamed's acting work includes A Fine Balance with Tamasha at Hampstead Theatre, a National Tour of Journey to the West with Tara Arts. At Tobacco Factory Theatre, he played Ali Baba in Ali Baba and the Forty Thieves as well as the 'step-brother' in Cinderella, both directed by Sally Cookson. He played the roles of James Henry Trotter in James and the Giant Peach at the Polka Theatre, Ben Gunn in Treasure Island at Bristol Old Vic and Tinker Bell in Peter Pan at Bristol Old Vic. He played Puck and as well as helped to puppeteer Puck in Midsummer Night's Dream at Bristol Old Vic, His theatre work also includes shows at The Kennedy Centre as well as stints at Oldham Coliseum Theatre, Leicester Haymarket Theatre and Man Mela.

As a writer, Ahamed has completed a number of plays. In February 2013, he performed his one-man show The Tiger and the Moustache at the Tobacco Factory Theatre in Bristol. In 2015, he performed his one-man show Strictly Balti: at The Gilded Balloon during the Edinburgh Festival Fringe in August, at the Tobacco Factory Theatre in October and Birmingham Repertory Theatre in November, before embarking on a national tour.

Since 2005, Ahamed has also worked as a professional storyteller, weaving his traditional tales in schools, restaurants, libraries and festivals in Bristol. In 2006, also received the Norman Beaton Fellowship from BBC Radio Drama and has worked regularly for them ever since.

In December 2011, Ahamed's first radio play, Telling Tales, was commissioned and aired on the BBC Asian Network.

In February 2015, Ahamed was interviewed on BBC Somerset. In November and December 2015, he was interviewed by Nadia Ali on BBC Asian Network. In October 2022, he portrayed the role of Nabil Rahim in the BBC soap opera Doctors.

== Personal life ==
Ahamed lives in Bristol with his wife, Jenny, and two children.

== Filmography ==
=== Film ===
Year	Title	Role	Notes
1999	East Is East	Zaid	Supporting role
2000	It Was an Accident	Ahmed	Supporting role
2000	7/7: Attack on London	Mohammad Sidique Khan	Supporting role
2006	Halal Harry	Naseem	Supporting role
2011	This Must Be the Place	Sumit	Supporting role
2012	Frail	Malik	Supporting role
2019	Aladdin	Jailer	Supporting role
2021	A Boy Called Christmas	Moodon	Supporting role
2024	Mary	Caspar	Supporting role

=== Television ===
Year	Title	Role	Notes
2008	Being Human	Mortuary Attendant	1 episode: pilot
2009	Monday Monday	Vince Arya	Recurring role
2009	Home Time	Egger	Series 1, episode 2
2011	Nuzzle and Scratch: Frock and Roll	Golfer	Episode: "Astronauts"
2012	Parents	Maths Teacher	Series 1, episode 5
2012; 2017	Trollied	Customer, Bloke	Series 2: 6 episodes, series 7: 1 episode
2013	Common Ground	Pav	Episode: "Nell, Ted & Marlon"
2013	Wizards vs Aliens	Security Man	Episode: "The Thirteenth Floor"
2016	Galavant	Valencian Peasant 1	Episode: "About Last Knight"
2017–2019	Apple Tree House	Nadeem	Recurring role
2019–2022	Pennyworth	Mr. Chadley	Recurring role
2022	Doctors	Nabil Rahim	Episode: "Everyone Has Something"

=== Stage ===
Year	Title	Role	Venue
2002	Journey to the West	Art	
2004	James and the Giant Peach	James Henry Trotter	Polka Theatre
2007	A Fine Balance	Ishvar	Hampstead Theatre
	East Is East		Oldham Coliseum
	Shepherd's Pie Anyone?		Theatre Royal Stratford East
	Gym Buddies		Soho Theatre
2009	Ali Baba and the Forty Thieves	Ali Baba	Tobacco Factory Theatre
2010	Treasure Island	Ben Gunn	Bristol Old Vic, Regent's Park Open Air Theatre, Young Vic
2011–2013	Cinderella	Step-brother	Tobacco Factory Theatre
2012	Peter Pan	Tinker Bell	Bristol Old Vic
2013–2014	Midsummer Night's Dream	Puck/Snug	Bristol Old Vic, Barbican Centre
2013	The Tiger and the Moustache	Hashi	Tobacco Factory Theatre, Birmingham Repertory Theatre, one-person play Also writer
2012	The Last Voyage of Sinbad the Sailor	Roy	Tobacco Factory Theatre, part of Travelling Light Theatre Company
2014–2017	Strictly Balti	Ahamed	The Gilded Balloon, Tobacco Factory Theatre, Birmingham Repertory Theatre, The Southbank Centre, The Oxford Festival of the Arts, one-person play Also writer
2015	Three Kings		Writer for Travelling Light Theatre Company
2017	The Miser	La Fleche	Garrick Theatre
2021	Hansel and Gretel		Writer for Insane Root Theatre
2024	Welcome to Gaza	Reader	Malcolm X Community Centre Bristol
2025	In Search of Goldoni		Bristol Old Vic, one-person play Also writer

=== Radio ===
Year	Title	Role	Notes
2006	Joseph Conrad - The Secret Agent	Waiter	BBC Radio 4 Extra political thriller
2007	Caesar!	Centurion, soldier, driver, Athenasius	BBC Radio 4 classic serial, series 3
2007	The Mahabharata	Uttara	BBC Radio 4 classic dramatised, episode: "Exile"
2007	Venus to Go		BBC Radio 4 drama
2007	India and Pakistan '07	Driver, Hitesh	BBC Radio 4 drama
2007	Oneira	Courier	BBC Radio 4 Extra sci-fi fantasy drama
2008–2009	Silver Street	Vinnie Mukherjee	BBC Asian Network soap
2008	Broken English	Police officer, Transport officer	BBC Radio 4 play
2009	Degrees of Separation	Doctor, Rishi Hussein	BBC Radio 4, episode 4 "Twins" and 5 "Ashes"
2011	Telling Tales	Ahmed- the teacher	BBC Asian Network drama Also writer
2015	Actor Saikat Ahamed and Timsbury Post Office	Himself	BBC Radio Bristol and BBC Radio Somerset with Steve Yabsley
2017	The Archers	Rachid	BBC Radio 4 soap

== See also ==
- British Bangladeshi
- List of British Bangladeshis
