= Cardiff Comedy Festival =

Comedy festival in Cardiff, Wales

The Cardiff Comedy Festival is organized by Scott Fitzgerald, Tom Wakeham, Richard Balshaw, Johnny Disco and Matt Price. As well as showcasing established, mainly Welsh, acts, the Festival also aims to nurture new talent, and in 2010 premiered the first Welsh Unsigned Standup Awards.

== 2009 Festival ==
The 2009 Festival ran from 21 to 26 July 2009, and was based entirely at O'Neill's bar. The heart of the festival was 10 Edinburgh preview shows. Featured artistes included

- Rhod Gilbert with support from Ellis James and James Gordillo
- Sketch troupe The Plastic Seat Company
- Matt Price
- Nick Page
- Wil Hodgson
- Pat Monahan
- Craig Campbell

== 2010 Festival ==
Although previous attempts to launch a comedy festival in Cardiff had failed, and promoters had in the past lost money on the venture, the 2009 Festival was sufficiently successful for the organisers to stage a larger event in 2010.

The 2010 Festival ran from the 16–26 July. The line up included

- Rhod Gilbert
- Lucy Porter
- Lloyd Langford
- Matt Price
- Russell Kane
- Jo Caulfield
- Pappy's
- Phil Nichol

In addition to the main festival, there is also the WUSA (Welsh Unsigned Standup Award) and a series of workshops in Cardiff Central Library.

Venues included St David's Hall, The Glee Club, Central Library, Nos Da and O'Neill's bar.

== 2011 Festival ==
Venues included include St David's Hall, The Glee Club, Nos Da (WUSA) and RWCMD

Acts included Craig Campbell, Johnny Disco, Taylor Glenn, Ardal O'Hanlon, Richard Herring, Ellis James, Wes Packer, Matt Price and JJ Whitehead

== 2012 Festival ==
Acts Included Lucy Porter, Vikki Stone, Matt Price, Richard Herring, Ellis James, Lloyd Langford and Wil Hodgeson

Venues included St David's Hall, The Glee Club, Central Library, Chapter Arts Centre and Gwdihw.

== 2025 Festival ==
The Cardiff Comedy Festival (now called "Cardiff Comedy and Music Festival") ran from October 30 - November 2, 2025, at St Peter's Hall in Cardiff.
