= Monday Monday =

- Genre: Comedy drama
- Written by: Ben Edwards; Rachel New; Jack Lothian; Malcolm Campbell; Harry Wootliff
- Directed by: Roger Goldby; Nick Laughland; Martin Dennis
- Starring: Fay Ripley; Morven Christie; Holly Aird
- Composer: Simon Lacey
- Country of origin: United Kingdom
- Original language: English
- No. of series: 1
- No. of episodes: 7

Production
- Executive producer: Margot Gavan Duffy
- Producer: Alison Davis
- Editors: Matthew Tabern; Peter Oliver; Steve Singleton
- Running time: 45. minutes approx
- Production company: Talkback Thames

Original release
- Network: ITV (not STV)
- Release: 13 July – 24 August 2009

Monday Monday is an ITV comedy drama. It stars Fay Ripley, Jenny Agutter, Neil Stuke, Holly Aird, Morven Christie, Tom Ellis, and Miranda Hart.

It is set in the head office of a supermarket that has fallen on hard times and had to re-locate its staff from London to Leeds. The show was initially announced as part of ITV's Winter 2007 press pack, but was "iced" until 2009 due to falling advertising in the wake of the economic downturn.

== Background ==
The show is named after The Mamas & the Papas song with the same name, though does not feature the song as a theme tune.

The show was commissioned by ITV's director of drama, Laura Mackie. Mackie said that the show aimed to "entertain, engage and strike a chord with the audience". Although the show was initially announced as part of ITV's Winter 2007 press pack, it was put on hold until 2009 due to falling advertising rates in the wake of the economic downturn. According to Broadcast, the show aimed to "shed light on a world of alcoholic HR bosses, power-crazed managers and sexually unfettered PAs".

Towards the end of the first episode, Christine is shown to be an alcoholic, which she eventually admits. As the series progresses the failing life of Christine becomes more central to the plot.

== Plot ==
The show features a group of head office workers for struggling supermarket chain Butterworths. As a result of downsizing, the workers are forced to move cities, relocating from London to Leeds.

== Cast ==
Management

- Clive Merrison – Gavin, chairman, Butterworths Group
- Peter Wight – Roger Sorsby, Chief Executive of Butterworth's Stores
- Jenny Agutter – Jenny Mountfield, PA to Roger Sorsby
- Holly Aird – Alyson Cartmell, Chief Operating Officer
- Tom Ellis – Steven McColl, PA to Alyson Cartmell

Human Resources

- Fay Ripley – Christine Frances, Head of Human Resources
- Morven Christie – Sally Newman, PA to Christine
- Miranda Hart – Tall Karen, Office Assistant
- Jodie Taibi – Small Karen, Office Assistant

Marketing

- Neil Stuke – Max Chambers, Acting Head of Marketing
- Laura Haddock – Natasha Wright, Marketing Assistant (prev. PA to Vivienne Wyatt. With Vivienne off sick recovering from cancer, Natasha is seconded to Max Chambers)
- Saikat Ahamed – Vince, PA to Max Chambers & Natasha Wright (prev. PA to Max Chambers)

Finance

- Nick Sampson – Keith Saunders, Head of Finance

Building Services & Facilities Management

- Joan Oliver – Susan, Facilities Manager
- Susan Earl – Janet, Facilities Assistant

Shop Floor

- Sue Vincent – Helen, Bakery Manager
- Bruce McGregor – Greg, Fish Manager
- Richard Fleeshman – Gillon, Bakery Customer Service Assistant

The departments named above are the main departments focused on but other departments are mentioned or featured on presentations. They include:

- Contracts
- Sourcing
- IT
- Design
- Property
- International Sales
- National Sales

== Butterworths Group PLC ==
Butterworths Head Office

The Head Office is arranged into a North Wing and a South Wing on all floors above the Lower Ground Floor.

- Lower Ground: Canteen, Building Services/Property/Facilities Management & Sourcing
- Ground Floor: Marketing (South) Meeting Area (North) & Reception/Security in Centre
- First Floor: Human Resources (South) Contracts (North)
- Second Floor: International Sales (South) Finance & Chief Executive's Office (North)
- Third Floor: National Sales (South) Design (North)

Other Services than Retail are Insurance Sales. Each department is managed by a Department Head and each department head has a personal assistant

== Episodes ==
1. Episode 1 (13 July 2009)
2. Episode 2 (20 July 2009)
3. Episode 3 (27 July 2009)
4. Episode 4 (3 August 2009)
5. Episode 5 (10 August 2009)
6. Episode 6 (17 August 2009)
7. Episode 7 (24 August 2009)

== Broadcast and reception ==
The show did not receive good reviews. Tim Walker of The Independent stated that the shows rival in the same timeslot, BBC One show The Street was "a darn sight more interesting than watching Fay Ripley walk into doors". Walker said that the show was filled with shots of Leeds, saying that the show was purely "advertising it as an attractive nightlife destination" or "to prove beyond doubt that ITV was fulfilling its obligations to the regions." (something that may have been fitting with ITV mothballing many parts of its Leeds Studios the same year). Sam Wollaston of The Guardian also criticised the show saying that it was "lame and laboured, tired and predictable".

The poor reception was reflected in the show's ratings, the show bringing in 3.7 million, a 16% viewing share, six per cent and 1.3 million viewers lower than The Street. The show, however, was second in its timeslot, beating the other three terrestrial channels in the slot. Despite being second in the timeslot, the show was down on the 5.6 million for ITV1's channel slot average so far in 2009.

Not helping matters in terms of viewing figures was that STV continued its recent trend of declining high-ticket ITV productions, thereby avoiding having to contribute to the production cost on a pro rata basis, and so Scottish viewers of terrestrial broadcasts were unable to view the series. The series average, based on overnight ratings was 2.90m, equating to a 13.2% viewing share.

| | Date | Overnight rating (millions) | Share | Official rating (millions) | Weekly rank | Source |
|---|---|---|---|---|---|---|
| Episode 1 | 13 July 2009 | 3.65 | 16.2% | 3.81 | 19 | |
| Episode 2 | 20 July 2009 | 3.40 | 15.0% | 3.20 | 24 | |
| Episode 3 | 27 July 2009 | 2.62 | 12.1% | n/a | 30+ | |
| Episode 4 | 3 August 2009 | 2.63 | 12.2% | n/a | 30+ | |
| Episode 5 | 10 August 2009 | 2.68 | 12.3% | 2.69 | 28 | |
| Episode 6 | 17 August 2009 | 2.47 | 11.3% | 2.54 | 29 | |
| Episode 7 | 24 August 2009 | 2.84 | 13.2% | 2.86 | 24 | |

== International broadcasts ==
In Australia, this programme aired each Friday at 8:30pm on ABC2 from 28 January 2011. In Serbia, this programme aired on Fox Life. In the United States the show is on Hulu.com and currently available via Netflix and YouTube.
