= Vaughan Savidge =

British radio announcer

Vaughan Edward Savidge (born 6 June 1956) is a former British freelance newsreader for BBC Radio 3, continuity announcer for BBC Radio 4, and formerly a newsreader the World Service. He also performed spoof news items on Armando Iannucci's Charm Offensive.

== Early life ==
Born in Luton, he spent his early years travelling around Africa, Australia and Singapore.

== Career ==
He returned to Britain for a few years with his family, but then gained his first job as a trainee journalist at Radio Television Hong Kong, where he dubbed Kung Fu films including The One Armed Swordsman. Later he joined the British Forces Broadcasting Service in Gibraltar. After a spell working in television in Germany he returned to London in 1996 where he joined Radio 4 as a newsreader, later adding work for Radio 3 and the World Service. In later years Vaughan could only be heard on Radio 3 and Radio 4, before leaving both stations in spring 2018.

== Personal life ==
He lives in Great Bromley, Essex, with his wife Katherine.
