= Will Smith Presents the Tao of Bergerac =

- Genre: Observational comedy
- Running time: 30 minutes
- Country of origin: United Kingdom
- Language(s): English
- Home station: BBC Radio 4
- Produced by: Tilusha Ghelani
- Original release: 2007 (BBC Radio 4)
- No. of episodes: 4
- Website: Will Smith Presents the Tao of Bergerac

Will Smith Presents the Tao of Bergerac is a British radio comedy programme broadcast on BBC Radio 4 in 2007. The programme is presented by the comedian Will Smith and concerns his obsession with the 1980s detective series Bergerac starring John Nettles. Nettles makes cameo appearances in each episode reading from a fictional audio book The Tao of Bergerac. The series was released on CD in February 2008.

== Episode titles and broadcast dates ==
1. "Justice" – 1 August 2007
2. "Individuality" – 8 August 2007
3. "Love" – 15 August 2007
4. "Machismo" – 22 August 2007
