= Jarred Christmas =

New Zealand comedian (born 1980)

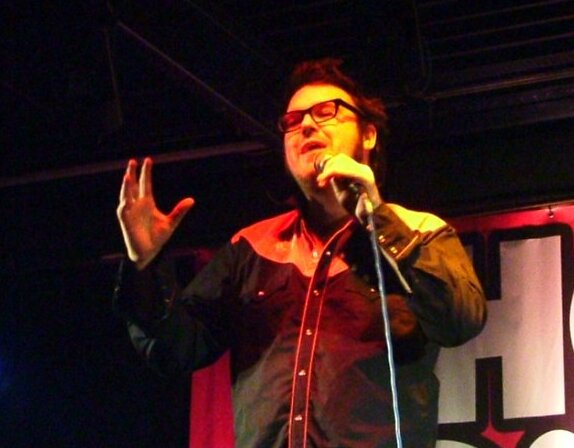
- Christmas performing in 2005
- Born: Christchurch, New Zealand
- Occupation: Comedian
- Years active: Late 1990s – present
- Awards: Chortle Awards, Best Compère (2010); Fred Award (2013)

Jarred Christmas (born c. 1980) is a comedian from New Zealand who now lives and works in the United Kingdom. He won the Chortle Comedy Award for Best Compère in 2010, and the Fred Award in 2013.

== Early life ==
Christmas grew up in Christchurch. He attended an all-boys secondary school where he did not fit in because he was not into sport. In 1996, he went to Hagley Community College for fifth form (now called Year 11) and credits the school with turning his life around, saying "For the first time in my life I met people who were themselves. It really changed my life."

Christmas moved to Britain in 2003.

== Career ==
=== Television and film ===
Christmas has appeared on radio, film, television and stage.

On television, he has appeared as a performer and guest panellist on shows such as BBC Two's Never Mind the Buzzcocks and Mock the Week, BBC Three's Russell Howard's Good News, Channel 4's 8 Out of 10 Cats and Dave's One Night Stand. In 2008 he appeared in Pot Noodle television advertisements.

In 2011, Christmas took part in Let's Dance for Comic Relief. He has also appeared on Celebrity Mastermind alongside fellow comedians Imran Yusuf, Karen Taylor and Russell Kane.

Christmas appeared in two films in 2012: The Wedding Video alongside Matt Berry, Miriam Margolyes and Robert Webb, and Is This a Joke? with Russell Tovey. He contributed to the feature-length documentary The People vs. George Lucas.

He appeared in the YouTube comedy web series Dwarves Assemble, which also featured Warwick Davis, Raymond Griffith, Peter Bonner and Simon Lane. He hosted the 2014 season of Monumental. Since 2014 he has been the Joke Master in the CBBC show The Joke Machine.

=== Theatre and live performance ===
Christmas has been performing live since the late 1990s. He had his debut in the green room above the Honeypot Cafe in Christchurch's Lichfield Street aged 18, noting that he thinks that he "got one laugh in five minutes". He was also a member of The Court Jesters as an improviser. He has performed at several festivals including Reading/Leeds, Liverpool Comedy Festival, Glasgow Comedy Festival, New Zealand International Comedy Festival and the Edinburgh Festival Fringe. In 2010 he toured the UK with his show Jarred Christmas Stands Up and in 2012 showcased his show Let's Go Mofo.

He has supported such acts as Ross Noble, Tommy Tiernan, Duncan Norvelle, Joe Dolce, Joe Pasquale, Jimmy Cricket, Bobby Davro, The Jon Spencer Blues Explosion, El Vez, The Grumbleweeds and The Bill star Jeff Stewart (actor) of PC Reg Hollis fame on his 2005 spoken word show 'Just An Honest Bobby'.

Later in 2013, Christmas appeared at the Cardiff Comedy Festival, which featured comedians such as Alan Davies and Matt Rees, and also at the Green Man Festival, in which the comedy was headlined by Josh Widdicombe.

== Personal life ==
In 2018 Christmas was diagnosed with Ménière's disease, after suffering from hearing difficulties, nausea and dizziness for some years. He uses a hearing aid, and has incorporated discussion of the condition into his act.
