= Knocker (radio series) =

British radio situational comedy

- Genre: Sitcom
- Running time: 15 minutes
- Country of origin: United Kingdom
- Language: English
- Home station: BBC 7
- Starring: Neil Edmond; Paula Wilcox
- Written by: Neil Edmond
- Produced by: Tilusha Ghelani
- Original release: 19 November – 24 December 2007
- No. of series: 1
- No. of episodes: 6
- Website: BBC Website

Knocker is a British radio situational comedy broadcast on digital radio station BBC 7, recorded before a live audience. It is written by and stars Neil Edmond as Ian Dunn, a long suffering market researcher. The series also co-stars Paula Wilcox as Ian's boss, Mary. The programme, produced by Tilusha Ghelani, was first broadcast between 19 November and 24 December 2007.

== Plot ==
Knocker revolves around the unfortunate tale of Ian Dunn, who works as the sole surviving market researcher for International Query Board UK. His position as the only member of the Board who actually goes out of the office to canvas the opinions of the public is not surprising, considering what has to put up with on a day-to-day basis. Ian has to put up with all kinds of bad weather, while trying to ask complete strangers about personal details on the street or at their homes. As a result, most people are hostile to him and he hardly ever gets any work done. The only people Ian ever manages to interview successfully tend to be those who are in it only to gain something from him, or because they are on the verge of insanity.

Ian also has to manage his problems with his boss, Mary. While Ian believes he is trying to be kind to her, she just wants him to get as many responses to his surveys as he possibly can. She even suggests to Ian that he should break the rules, but Ian considers breaking the Market Research Code of Conduct unacceptable, even if it would make his job easier. While not sorting out Ian's problems, Mary usually tries to solve those of Andre, a character who never appears, but is constantly referred to as someone who is accident prone.

== Reception ==
Knocker has had some positive reviews. Phil Daoust from The Guardian chose the series as his "Pick of the Day" saying, "Elsewhere, Knocker (11.15pm, BBC7) is having a few laughs at the expense of market researchers. Ian Dunn (Neil Edmond) is the International Query Board UK's longest-serving door-to-door interviewer, spreading a little irritation everywhere he goes with his broken clipboard and inappropriate footwear. Some people, it seems, would rather hide in their bins than answer questions about flannels ..."

== Episodes ==
No.	Title	Original release date
1	"Privinvasionacy"	19 November 2007
Ian attempts to carry out a survey which involves people's bodily habits. To be exact, their lower bodily habits.
2	"Eligibilliant"	26 November 2007
Ian goes out on Halloween to a rough council estate to ask some children their views on yogurt. Along the way, he meets an old woman who thinks he is Death.
3	"Obselejectivitysence"	3 December 2007
Ian tests out a new electronic system designed to make his job easier. However, he tests out in a street where all the houses are to be demolished.
4	"Confidentialitydence"	10 December 2007
Ian carries out some product placement in a block of flats, when he becomes involved with a love-starved woman.
5	"Incentativity"	17 December 2007
Mary gives Ian an added incentive when he carries out a survey concerning racial tolerance - if he interviews someone, he gets to eat.
6	"Profitch"	24 December 2007
A journey along a dual carriageway and a chance meeting with a self-proclaimed prophet leads Ian to make an important choice in his life.
