= Hils Barker =

British comedian and writer

Hils Barker is a British comedian and writer. She was a finalist in newcomer competitions So You Think You're Funny and The Daily Telegraph Open Mic Award, and went on to write and perform in two series of comedy show Radio9 for BBC Radio 4. Her stand up comedy often includes political and musical elements, and she took her first solo show to the Edinburgh fringe festival in 2006. She has appeared on The Comic Side of Seven Days and The Late Edition, as well as radio shows such as Jammin', Vent, 28 Acts in 28 Minutes and Shappi Talk hosted by Shappi Khorsandi.
