= Emma Fryer =

British comedian and actor

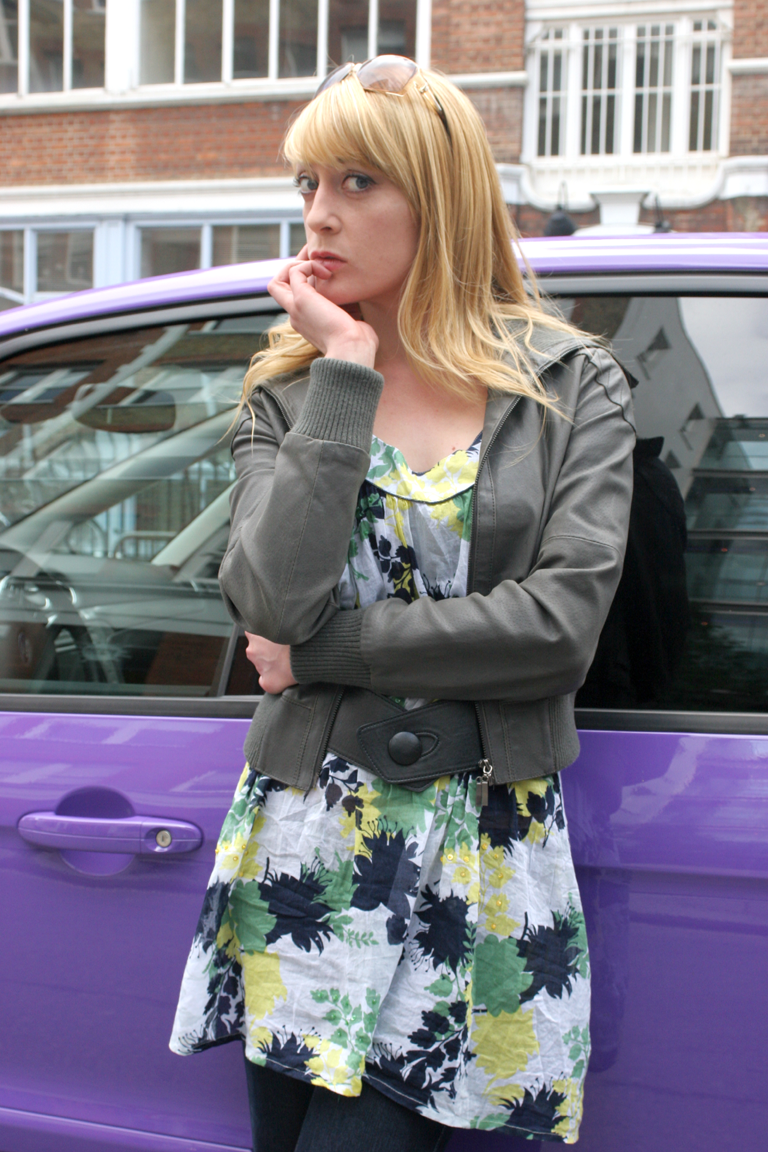
- Born: Coventry, England, United Kingdom
- Notable work: Ideal, Home Time

Comedy career
- Years active: 2005–present
- Medium: Stand up, television, theatre, radio

Emma Fryer is a British stand-up comedian, actress and writer from Coventry, best known for playing Tania in BBC Three's Ideal, Janine in E4's PhoneShop and Gaynor in BBC Two's Home Time, which she co-wrote with Neil Edmond.

== Career ==
In 2005, she was a finalist in the So You Think You're Funny?, Funny Women and Leicester Mercury Comedian of the Year competitions. She has also appeared as one of the spoof presenters in Channel 4's Comedy Lab Swizzcall, played the lead character, Dawn Jones, in the online sitcom Where are the Joneses? and provided the single additional voice in the finale of Tim Key's All Bar Luke. More recently, she has appeared in BBC dramas Moving On and In The Dark.

Fryer was nominated for The Times Breakthrough Award 2010, while Home Time was nominated for Best Sitcom at both the 2010 South Bank Show Awards and The Rose D'Or.

== Filmography ==
=== Film ===
Year	Film	Role	Director	Notes
2007	I Want Candy	Mistress Award Winner	Stephen Surjik	Uncredited
2011	Kill List	Fiona	Ben Wheatley	

=== Television ===
Year	Title	Role	Notes
2007–2011	Ideal	Tania	20 episodes
2007	Doctors	Vicky West	8.173 "Aftermath"
2007	Where Are the Joneses?	Dawn Jones	93 episodes
2007	Comedy Lab	Female Presenter	9.08 "Swizzcall"
2008	Love Soup	Sue	2.09 "Kiss of Death"
2008	Torn Up Tales	Beauty	Television film
2008	After You've Gone	Attractive Women in Pub	3.05 "The Lure of the Rings"
2009	Home Time	Gaynor Jacks	Writer; 6 episodes
2009	Comedy Showcase	Janine	2.02 "PhoneShop"
2010–2013	PhoneShop	Janine	19 episodes
2012	Getting On	Ezzi Heat Hostess	3.01 "Episode One"
2013	Chickens	Nellie	5 episodes
2013	Toast of London	Susan Random	1.01 "Addictive Personality"
2013	Moving On	Roxanne	4.05 "That's Amore"
2015	Critical	Mrs. Rebecca Osgood	9 episodes
2016	Moving On	Hayley	7.03 "A Picture of Innocence"
2017	In the Dark	Linda Bates	Television miniseries
2019	Shakespeare & Hathaway: Private Investigators	Maggie Messenger	2.02 "The Play's the Thing"
2022	Skint	Hannah	1.03 "Hannah"
2022	Red Rose	Jennifer	5 episodes
