= Oneira =

UK radio program

- Genre: Radio drama
- Running time: 30 minutes
- Country of origin: United Kingdom
- Language(s): English
- Home station: BBC Radio 4 Extra
- Starring: Lyndsey Marshal; Peter Marinker
- Written by: Robert Easby
- Produced by: Liz Webb
- Original release: 3 September – 7 September 2007
- No. of series: 1
- No. of episodes: 5
- Audio format: Stereophonic sound
- Website: Oneira at BBC Radio 4 Extra

Oneira is a science fiction comedy written for BBC Radio 4 Extra by Robert Easby. It tells a surreal story of the encounter between a young museum guard, called Oneira, and a 400-year-old alchemist calling himself Nikolai. Nikolai claims to be the artist who painted one of the pictures hanging in the museum. The painting includes a figure who resembles Nikolai himself. He also tells Oneira that he and she are destined to search for a book of alchemy called the Lux Ata or "Book of Black Light". The resulting quest involves aliens, string theory, a sinister official from the electricity board called "Mister Resistor", a TV cooking show, a cappuccino bar, a comedian travelling by flying saucer, and a dead science fiction author. Oneira's boyfriend Pete is transformed from an up-and-coming young financier in the City into a bucket of water and a pair of Argyll socks while their expensive penthouse flat is destroyed by a ravenous refrigerator.

== Cast ==
- Oneira – Lyndsey Marshal
- Nikolai – Peter Marinker
- Other parts – Joseph Kloska, Gerard McDermott, Saikat Ahamed, Chas Early, Jon Glover, Christine Kavanagh, Bethan Walker, Sam Dale, Anna Wing, Mark Straker
