= The Diary of Edward the Hamster 1990–1990 =

The Diary of Edward the Hamster 1990–1990 is a British graphic novel written by Miriam and Ezra Elia. Published in 2012 in Romanian by Humanitas, and in September 2013 by Penguin Press-owned Blue Rider Press, the book takes the form of a diary of an unhappy pet hamster that Miriam and her brother Ezra once owned. In the book, Edward is presented as an existentialist diarist, given to writing about his life, his disdain for doing tricks and for the free-roaming but mentally imprisoned family cat—with Edward striving to find meaning before his too-short life comes to an end.

The story was first brought to the attention of a publisher in 2011, when Miriam performed a stage reading of Edward's "journals" in London. Edward previously appeared in a UK radio piece as well as episode in Miriam Elia's comedy sketch show, A Series of Psychotic Episodes.

NPR's "Book Concierge" chose the work as one of its 2013's "Great Reads."
