= Jason John Whitehead =

Canadian stand-up comedian and television writer

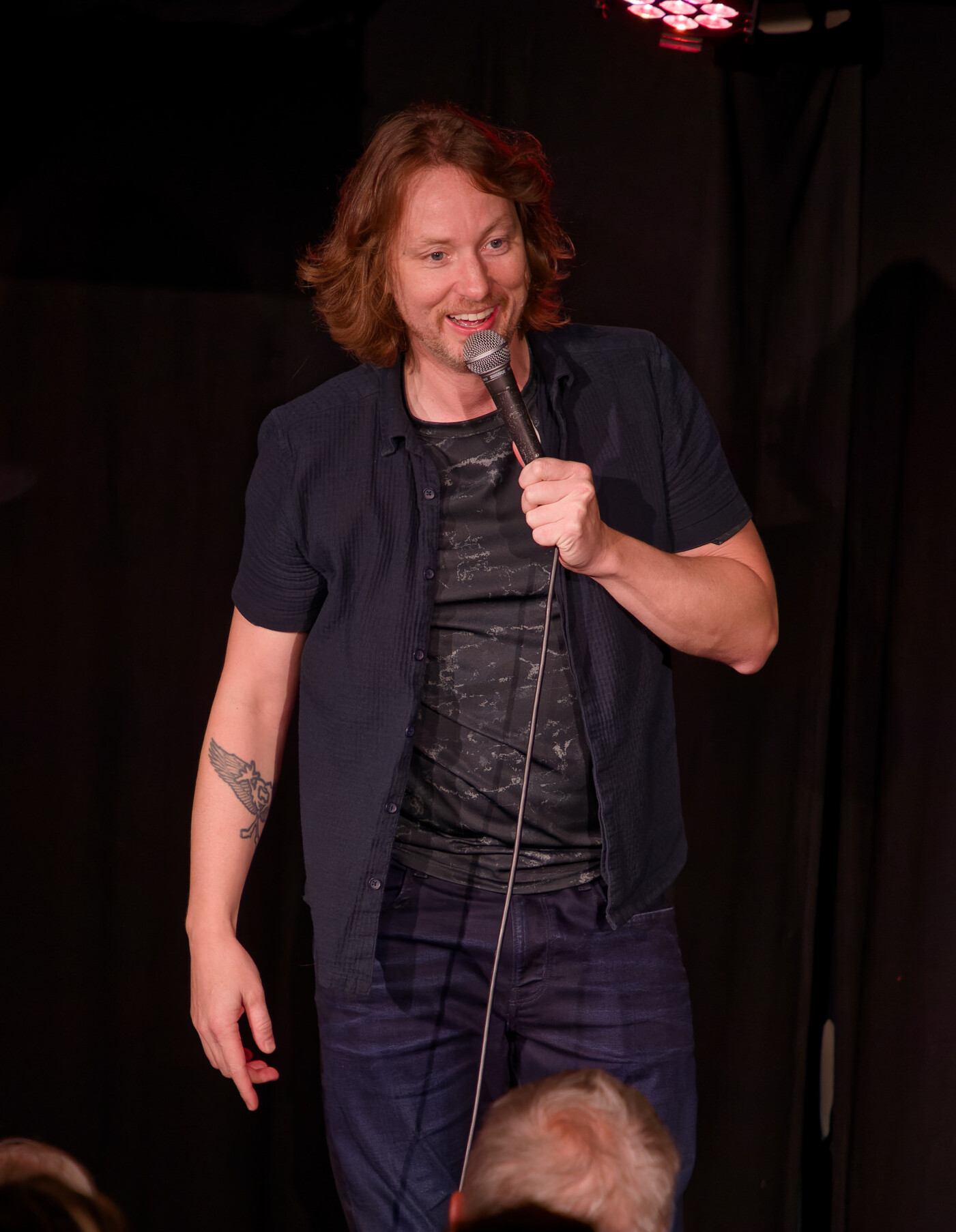
- Whitehead at the 2024 Edinburgh Festival Fringe
- Born: Cole Harbour, Nova Scotia, Canada
- Other name: JJ Whitehead
- Occupations: Stand-up comedian, television writer
- Years active: 1998–present
- Website: Official website

Jason John "JJ" Whitehead is a Canadian stand-up comedian and television writer. He has appeared on British and international TV and radio, and was a staff writer on The Jim Jefferies Show (Comedy Central) from 2017 to 2019. Whitehead regularly performs at the Edinburgh Festival Fringe, with recent solo hours including Fool Disclosure (2016), Five Times I Lied to Myself (2019), White Noise (2023) and Clubbed (2024). He also co-hosts the weekly podcast STANDBY with JJ and Francisco with comedian Francisco Ramos.

== Personal life ==
Whitehead grew up in Cole Harbour, Nova Scotia, and by 2020 was based in Hollywood, California. He spent many years earlier in his career working from the United Kingdom.

== Career ==
Whitehead began performing stand-up in Scotland in 1998; he has said his first gig was at The Stand Comedy Club in Edinburgh. In 2000 he won the BBC New Comedy Award and was also a finalist for The Daily Telegraph Comedy Award at the Edinburgh Fringe.

His broadcast credits include Comedy Central at The Comedy Store (UK, 2010) and 28 Acts in 28 Minutes on BBC Radio 4.

From 2017 to 2019, Whitehead was a writer on Comedy Central’s The Jim Jefferies Show.

=== Edinburgh Fringe shows ===
Year	Show title	Notes
2000	The Midnight Show	Gilded Balloon showcase with Dougie Dunlop, Keara Murphy, Joe Heenan.
2001	Off the Kerb Roadshow	Finalist showcase with Shappi Khorsandi, Mark Felgate, Angie McEvoy.
2002	Immigrant	Reviewed in The Independent; listed as Venue 33, 21:45 (1 hr), to 26 Aug.
2003	Serious Dude	Solo hour at the Fringe (listing).
2005	Jason John Whitehead	Reviewed by Chortle.
2007	Pretending To Be Retarded is Impolite.. and other revelations	Solo hour at the Fringe.
2008	The Joker	Underbelly run; reviewed by Fest/The Skinny.
2009	Emotional Whitemale	Reviewed at the Fringe.
2011	Letters From Mindy	Udderbelly, Bristo Square (listing).
2016	Fool Disclosure	PBH Free Fringe, The Liquid Rooms (8:45pm; multiple dates).
2019	Five Times I Lied to Myself	Gilded Balloon Teviot run (listing).
2023	White Noise	Reviewed by Chortle; Stand’s New Town Theatre listing.
2024	Clubbed	Solo hour (listing).

== Comedy albums ==
- Fool Disclosure (2016).
- Live Before Lockdown (2020).
- Live in London (2025).
