= Miriam Elia =

British artist and broadcaster

Miriam Elia is a British artist and broadcaster.

She wrote and starred in the comedy sketch show A Series of Psychotic Episodes. The pilot was first broadcast on BBC Radio 7 on 7 March 2007, as one of 10 entries for BBC Radio 7's "Witty and Twisted" competition. It won the competition and was awarded by having a full series, first broadcast on 2 November 2008. It later moved to BBC Radio 4.

With her brother Ezra Elia, she also wrote We go to the gallery, a satire on modern art in the form of a Ladybird Book. Among the works satirised were Imponderabilia by Marina Abramović and Balloon Dog by Jeff Koons. The book drew threat of legal action from Penguin Group for breach of copyright, and some changes were made to the names of characters and logos so it could be published as a parody. Penguin later released their own series of adult oriented Ladybirds books.

Elia has also written and illustrated an animation and book The Diary of Edward the Hamster 1990–1990 with her brother Ezra Elia. This was based on a character in A Series of Psychotic Episodes.

Elia is a supporter of Brexit. In 2018 she took part in a discussion on the BBC News channel about the potential effects that Britain leaving the EU might have on its creative industries. During the discussion she spoke of her involvement with the group 'Artists for Brexit' and confirmed that she had voted to leave the EU in the 2016 EU Referendum. Throughout the live segment, she suggested several ways that U.K. creative industries might stand to benefit outside of the European Union.
