= The Tiger and the Moustache =

Play

- Original language: English
- Written by: Saikat Ahamed

The Tiger and the Moustache (previously called Bangladesh) is a one-person play by British actor Saikat Ahamed about tracing his mother's journey from Bangladesh to Britain.

== Summary ==
The play follows the story of Saikat Ahamed's own mother, Hashi, who was born on the day India declares independence, growing up in the Sunderban jungles, smiling and surrounded by flying tigers. Snapshots of time are taken, as the audience retrace her steps from the 1947 Partition to Glasgow in the 1970s right up to present day as she travels from Bangladesh to the United Kingdom.

== Background ==
The Tiger and the Moustache (previously called Bangladesh) is a one-man play, referring to an old Bengali folk tale about a man who could catch a tiger with the strength of his facial hair. It was developed with support from Bristol Ferment at Bristol Old Vic.

Barefoot, Ahamed gradually sheds layers of clothes throughout the story, adapting his attire with the addition of various accessories. The odd sound effect is added for emphasis, along with the warm lighting glow of a Bangladeshi sun, while a chair, woven with material forms the central prop. Integrating physical theatre and song into the performance, he mimics personalities and nationalities of people met along the journey with a very funny, and sometimes even alarming, likeness.

The narrative is laid out with time jumping back and forth. The show covers a cast of hundreds.

== Tour ==
The Tiger and the Moustache debuted at the Tobacco Factory Theatre in February 2013.

== Critical response ==
Holly Spanner of The Reviews Hub rated The Tiger and the Moustache 3/5 and said it "tackles some difficult issues, including political instability, nationality, pride and identity. Ahamed addresses these issues in a way which puts the audience at ease, mixing in generous helpings of comedy with a dynamic, truthful and energetic story." Shane Morgan of Whatsonstage.com rated it 3/5 and said, "Ahamed gives a fire cracker of a performance switching from one character to the next and checking in as the narrator in between with enough clarity to make each one clear… Ahamed’s charisma as a performer shines through."

Worcester News said, "The piece tells a captivating tale, both personal and political, through storytelling, theatre, music, dance and a healthy amount of humour." Bristol Post said of the play, "Ahamed is an excellent storyteller, bringing an energetic bounce to the stage that invests his performance with real fizz...it superbly encapsulates Ahamed’s skills as a writer as well as a performer".

Bristol Culture called it "One of the top five theatrical highlights of 2013!"

== See also ==
- British Bangladeshi
