= Where Are the Joneses? =

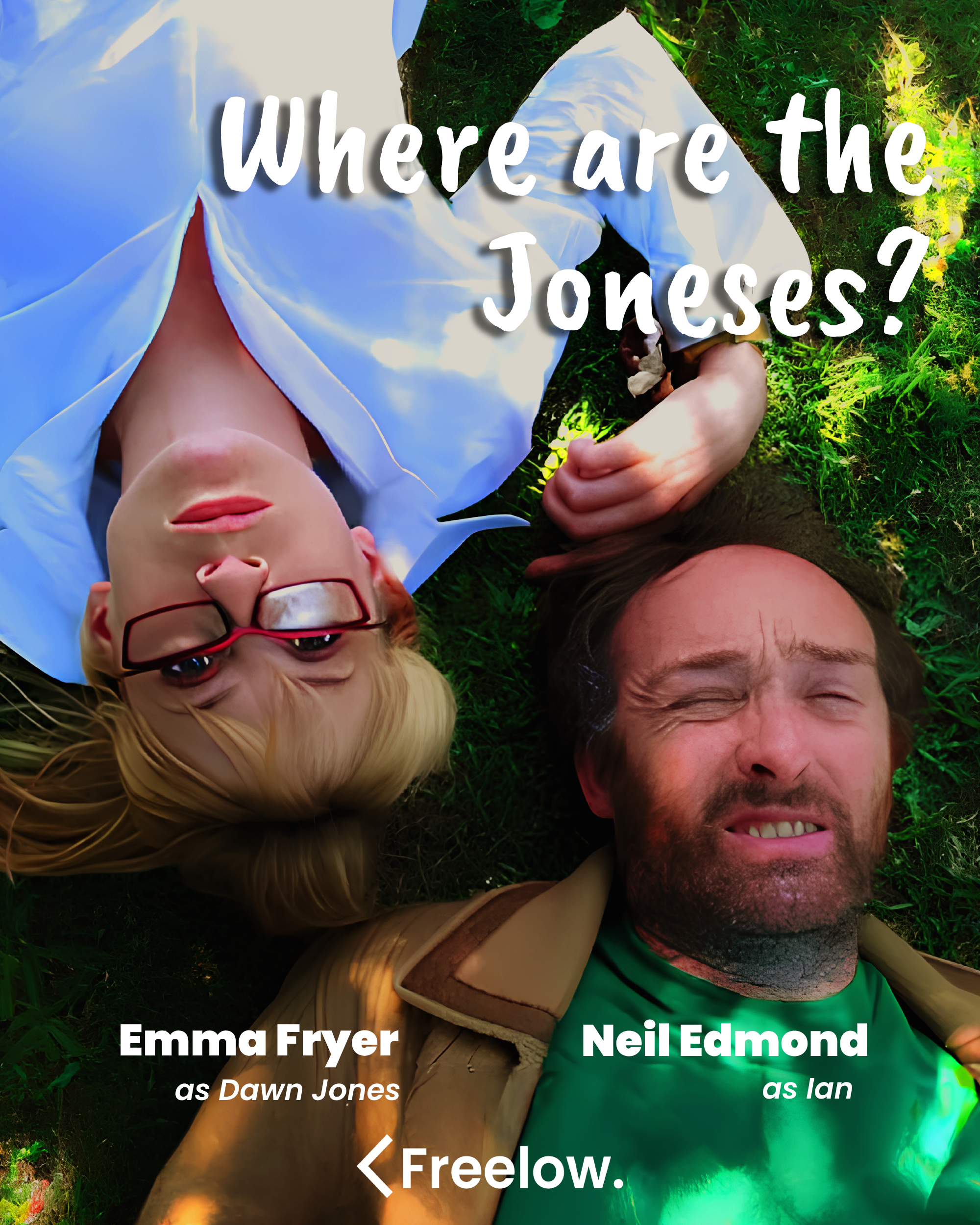
- Genre: Comedy
- Starring: Emma Fryer
- Country of origin: England
- Original language: English

Original release
- Network: YouTube
- Release: 2007 – 2007

Where Are the Joneses? was a 2007 British daily online sitcom created by the Imagination Group and Baby Cow Productions, sponsored by Ford of Europe, and promoted by digital specialists Hot Cherry.

The script of each three to six-minute episode was collaboratively written by viewers via wikis and social networking sites such as mySpace, Facebook, Flickr and blogs, with each character having their own Twitter feed. The faux-documentary style video was filmed daily on location and was also available to view via YouTube. The first episode was released on 15 June 2007.

The plot follows Dawn Jones, who discovers in the opening episode that she is the child of a sperm donor and follows her travels around Europe to find her 26 siblings. It stars Emma Fryer in the lead role, with Neil Edmond as Ian, the first brother she locates and who travels with her.

Unusually, the production was released under a Creative Commons 'Attribution-Share alike' licence, allowing it to be freely re-edited, even commercially, and press coverage has considered it as 'Wikipedia-like' in allowing anyone to edit and contribute to the storyline.

== Release ==
First uploaded to YouTube in 2007, "Where are the Joneses?" is an early example of a web series. The sitcom had 92 episodes, each of which were between three and six minutes long, along with an internet only spin-off named "Jack Nibbs".

The sitcom was upscaled and re-released by FreelowTV's Youtube channel as long form sitcom on 30 March 2024.

In February 2024, Kino Technologies released a dedicated iOS app for Where are the Joneses?, allowing viewers to experience the series in “real-time”. The app features the ability to watch episodes, read characters’ blog posts and tweets, and participate in forums to discuss the story with other viewers.
