= A Series of Psychotic Episodes =

- Other names: Series of Psychotic Episodes
- Genre: Sketch show
- Running time: 15 minutes
- Country of origin: United Kingdom
- Language: English
- Home station: BBC Radio 7 (Pilot and Series 1); BBC Radio 4 (Series 2)
- Starring: Miriam Elia; Dan Tetsell; Ruth Donegan (Series 1); Alyssa Kyria (Series 1); James Kenward (Series 1); Joanna Neary (Series 1); Rachel Atkins (Series 2); Pippa Evans (Series 2); Geoffrey McGivern (Series 2); David Reed (Series 2)
- Written by: Miriam Elia; Ezra Elia; James Kenward (Series 1)
- Produced by: Victoria Lloyd
- Original release: 7 March 2007 – Present
- No. of series: 2
- No. of episodes: 9 (including pilot)

A Series of Psychotic Episodes, also known as Series of Psychotic Episodes, is a Sony Award nominated surreal comedy sketch show written by and starring Miriam Elia. The pilot and first series were broadcast on digital radio station BBC Radio 7. The second series was broadcast on BBC Radio 4. Sketches include a spoof of children's television show Postman Pat called Postmodern Pat, a mosquito who has seen too many Hitchcock films, and her childhood hamster, Edward, who became the subject of the graphic novel, The Diary of Edward the Hamster 1990–1990.

The programme was first broadcast as a pilot on 7 March 2007, as one of 10 entries for BBC Radio 7's "Witty and Twisted" competition. A Series of Psychotic Episodes won the competition and was awarded by having a full series, first broadcast on 2 November 2008. A second series was commissioned and broadcast on BBC Radio 4 in 2010.

== History ==
A Series of Psychotic Episodes first began as a pilot for BBC Radio 7's "Witty and Twisted" competition. In the competition, a series of comedians were invited to create their own radio show pilots, the best of which would be commissioned for a full series. Elia's pilot first reached a shortlist of fifty, which was later reduced to ten finalists. Each finalist then recorded a new fifteen-minute pilot. The finalists' pilots were broadcast weekly on BBC Radio 7. Out of these, A Series of Psychotic Episodes was chosen as the winner and Elia awarded a series. One of the runners up, Gus Murdoch's Sacred Cows written and performed by Stephen Carlin, was also given a full series.

After A Series of Psychotic Episodes was broadcast, it was nominated for the comedy award in the Sony Radio Academy Awards. This was seen as unusual, as the show was a single pilot performed by a relatively unknown comedian. However, it lost the award to Down the Line. In 2010, the series moved to BBC Radio 4.

== Reception ==
A Series of Psychotic Episodes has had positive reviews from critics. Harry Deansway from The Guardian said that Elia was a welcome change saying that: "Radio comedy is largely populated by plummy World Service voices doing skits that sound like unironic Mr Cholmondley-Warner sketches from Harry Enfield's TV series, so the different tone and voice of Miriam Elia's A Series Of Psychotic Episodes really stands out." However, Deansway also said, "the show's not quite the finished product, though it probably offers a glimpse into the future of British comedy."
