= Strictly Balti =

- Original language: English
- Written by: Saikat Ahamed

Premiere
- Date: 11 August 2015

Strictly Balti is a one-person play by British actor Saikat Ahamed about growing up as the child of first generation immigrants in Birmingham in the 1980s.

== Summary ==
Saikat is a second-generation Bangladeshi English, caught between being Sid at school and Saikat at home. Caught between parents who want him to be tied to his Bangladeshi roots, and parents who want him to be a good English boy.

The play follows Saikat through school in Birmingham and travelling with his parents on trips back to Bangladesh, as he tries to figure out who he is, where he comes from, and where he belongs.

== Overview ==
Ahamed takes on the roles of the other people in his life: his parents, the nuns at his primary school, his ballroom teacher.

== Background ==
In November 2015, Ahamed told The Reviews Hub "When I was making the piece, I was writing it going, 'Oh yeah, this is funny ', and then actually in the rehearsal process, I realised how personal it was. It's been a real privilege, genuinely, because from my mind, theatre should really be about connecting to people and actually there is a truth in this piece.",

In January 2016, he told The University Paper "It was commissioned as an exploration of being a second-generation immigrant – but I’ve found that I'm even more interested in the universality of experience," he says. "It's not so much about being a British Asian kid as much as it's a play about just being a kid." He added, "Doing a one-man show takes all of your concentration times ten – with no-one else on stage, you have to be able to bounce off the audience."

In November 2015, "Because it is a true story. It is my story, and people seem to really respond to that."

== Production ==
Strictly Balti is written and performed by Ahamed, commissioned by the Travelling Light Theatre Company (which was its 46th production), directed by Sally Cookson, the set design by Katie Sykes and musical direction from Peter Judge.

== Tour ==
Strictly Balti debuted at the Edinburgh Festival Fringe in August 2015. The show was also performed at Birmingham Repertory Theatre in November.

== Critical response ==
Jane Howard of Fest Mag Hub said of Strictly Balti, "The story, though touching on complex issues, is told simply to appeal to children as well as adults." Selwyn Knight of The Reviews Hub said, "...what Ahamed crafts on stage is a truly emotionally touching tale." Chris Oldham of The Reviews Hub called it "...sweet, poignant hour of theatre that seeks to unite rather than divide." Joan Phillips of The Reviews Hub said, "Ahamed's performance is superbly acted and tenderly told. Saikat's recollections are all the more touching as they are so obviously personal."

Steve Mellen of Bristol Post said "Saikat is a gem in the Bristol theatre scene, and long may he hang around to share his skills with us." Guide2Bristol called it "A thought-provoking delight, with comedy and poignancy aplenty." Stagetalk Magazine said, "This is storytelling at its best. Never sentimental, sometimes explosive... it explores the bewilderment, comedy and pathos in the rub between East and West."

== See also ==
- British Bangladeshi
