= Radio9 =

British surreal comedy sketch show

Radio9 is a surreal comedy sketch show set in a fictional radio station. Broadcast on BBC Radio 4 between 2003 and 2006, it was written by Hils Barker and Johnny Daukes. It ran for two series with a total of nine episodes. Radio9 was adapted for TV on BBC Three, changing its name to The Message.

The show targeted some traditional radio formats, including plays, interviews, adverts and documentaries, as well as trailing programmes that are never heard, and advertising activities which are "coming soon" to Radio9, such as Contract Bridge.

The show often used the taglines: "Round the clock radio... 24 hours a day" and "Real radio, for real people. With real radios."

== Show segments ==
The show is divided into distinct segments:

- The "News Creation" segment of the show involves Radio9 creating road accidents, power failures or "acts of civil obedience", and then reporting it live.
- In "The Big Debate", the host attempts to incite her guests to violence by relaying inflammatory and incorrect information: "Well, this is a tragedy that reasoned debate should descend so quickly to mud-slinging.... He just called you a poof, what's your response to that?"
- "The Great Pretender" is a reality show in which ordinary people attempt to fool a panel of experts in tasks such as piloting an aircraft, downhill skiing or heart surgery. Relayed by a sports commentary team.
- The "Adverts" portion contains humorous adverts. Examples include Pro-Celebrity Bee Keeping and NIMBY (Not in My Back Yard).
- "The Afternoon Play"
- "Sport... and Talk" features sports talk, ranging from the Board Game Olympics to premiership football, as commentated on by Ted Hughes and Sylvia Plath.
- "Chasing Rainbows" involves "Ordinary People in Extraordinary Circumstances".
- "New Movements" shows Quentin Montreal investigating numerous topics such as the Accidentalist Art Movement.
