= Home Time =

British comedy-drama TV series

- The cast of Home Time in 2009. Clockwise from top left: Mel, Kelly, Becky and at the front Gaynor.
- Genre: Comedy drama
- Written by: Emma Fryer; Neil Edmond
- Directed by: Christine Gernon
- Starring: Emma Fryer; Marian McLoughlin; Philip Jackson; Hayley Jayne Standing; Kerry Godliman; Rebekah Staton
- Narrated by: Gaynor Jacks played by Emma Fryer
- Opening theme: "Hometown Unicorn" by Super Furry Animals
- Country of origin: United Kingdom
- Original language: English
- No. of series: 1
- No. of episodes: 6

Production
- Executive producers: Henry Normal; Lindsay Hughes
- Producer: Ted Dowd
- Running time: 30 minutes
- Production companies: BBC; Baby Cow Productions

Original release
- Network: BBC Two
- Release: 14 September – 22 October 2009

Home Time is a British television comedy-drama written by and starring Emma Fryer with Neil Edmond co-writing. The first series ran on BBC Two between 14 September and 22 October 2009. Home Time is set and filmed in Coventry, England.

== Plot ==
=== Series 1 (2009) ===
Gaynor Jacks has come home. Home to Coventry, home to her mum and dad's house, home to the three best friends who called her mad for ever leaving. At the age of 17, she ran off to find her place in the big wide world, but now she is back, at 29, with her tail between her legs and not so much as a starter home to show for her troubles. Gaynor cannot hide forever in her tiny time-capsule bedroom with its Trainspotting poster peeling above the single bed and "Wonderwall" still paused on the CD player. She must crawl back into the life she left behind, suffering the gleeful sympathy of her friends and ill-judged parental intrusions, all played out in front of old flames and adversaries she thought she should never see again, and underscored by smirking cries of 'See you are back then'.

== Cast and characters ==
- Emma Fryer portrays Gaynor Jacks, Gaynor cannot hide forever, but a faint smile and a talent for fibbing are her only defences against the gleeful sympathy of her friends. It is like they kept her seat warm, knowing she should be back. It does not matter what she had achieved down south, or how she had changed. If her Mum and friends have their way, she will be exactly what she used to be: 17 all over again.
- Hayley Jayne Standing portrays Mel Wedglake, As Gaynor's best friend, Mel knows best. She has never left the West Midlands, living by choice at her parents' house and still makes her living through babysitting, but why should that disqualify her from doling out advice? She has read Marie Claire. Plus, by relentlessly advising others she does not have to look at her own failings. Mel will look you sweetly in the eye while pulling you to pieces. After all, if it is for your own good, it is not cruelty, is it? She is also a romantic, of sorts, and wants to be seen as the embodiment of maternal warmth.
- Kerry Godliman portrays Becky Hogg, The go-getter. The long hours have finally paid off. With her commission-winning catch phrase "Cladding's Back" she is now Head of Marketing at CovConClad (Coventry's leading conservatories and cladding company). Becky is a massive fish in a pokey pond and wants the lifestyle to match, even if she cannot afford it. This provincial player can never admit that she is desperately scrimping for the rent on her tiny apartment. She is doggedly pragmatic and straight-talking so vulnerability, affection and gratitude only ever leak out of her in grunts and punches.
- Rebekah Staton portrays Kelly Langley, Kelly is the bouncy one of the group. A still-aspiring DJ, Kelly's been caning it hard in Cov since she was 15. Still wild, still clubbing, still unable to persuade any club owner to let her have any more than a 30-minute set, Kelly's idiotic vigour is undiminished and her daft clothes, demeanour and buoyant physique contrast with her craggy fun-worn face. Kelly's beauty's faded at the same rate as her eyesight, so she does not see the creases: she is pretty sure she is 22, give or take a couple of years.
- Marian McLoughlin portrays Brenda Jacks, Gaynor's mum Brenda is by turns suffocating fond and sourly judgemental - she cannot quite forgive her daughter for running away and making her look like a bad mum. She hides her resentment under energetic martyrdom and, though she dearly wants Gaynor to stay, they cannot help but pick up where they left off: frustrated mother and sulking teen. In the 12 years she has been denied the role of mother, Brenda has overplayed a number of other roles, the latest being a 'befriender' at the local Irish centre, accent and all.
- Philip Jackson portrays Roy Jacks, Gaynor's dad Roy is delighted to have her back home but has no idea how to make her feel better. He does his best to mediate and reassure, despite his generation's lack of tools for the job - words do not come easy to Roy, but he is brave enough to keep trying. Gentle, cumbersome and big handed, this practical man has found nothing to do since he was made redundant from his supervisory position on the factory floor at the car plant. His mild contentment contains a shred of unfocused longing.

== Episodes ==
=== Series One (2009) ===
#	Episode	Writer	Director	Original airdate
1	Episode One	Emma Fryer & Neil Edmond	Christine Gernon	14 September 2009
Gaynor Jacks - who ran away from Coventry 12 years ago - has come back home and is hiding in her teenage bedroom. But mum Brenda makes sure she gets out and faces up to the friends she left behind: manipulative Mel, club-weary Kelly and angry Becky.
2	Episode Two	Emma Fryer & Neil Edmond	Christine Gernon	21 September 2009
Gaynor's friends insist, now she is back, that she needs a boyfriend and a job. While they figure out which lad from school might still be available, Gaynor must prepare for a power dinner with the head honchos of cladding firm CovConClad.
3	Episode Three	Emma Fryer & Neil Edmond	Christine Gernon	28 September 2009
After a furious row with mum Brenda, Gaynor storms out of the house and is stranded up town. The girls come to the rescue, diagnose depression and cheer her up with a romantic mission - to find Paul Walsh, the One That Got Away.
4	Episode Four	Emma Fryer & Neil Edmond	Christine Gernon	5 October 2009
Just when she is settling back in, dad Roy decides to spruce up Gaynor's room "now she's having boys over". Meanwhile, Becky finds out about an age-old insult from Mel which blows the group apart. Gaynor must choose: Becky or Mel.
5	Episode Five	Emma Fryer & Neil Edmond	Christine Gernon	15 October 2009
While Gaynor summons up the courage to run off again, Kelly is the first of the girls to turn 30. Rather than leave her pal in her time of need, Gaynor mucks in with a budget luxury spa day and a night on the town.
6	Episode Six	Emma Fryer & Neil Edmond	Christine Gernon	22 October 2009
As the girls wake up from a boozy sleepover, Gaynor gets a nasty shock - an invitation to a school reunion. Whether she goes or not, she is finally going to have to face up to all the rumours about why she went and what went wrong.

== Reception ==
Home Time received a positive critical response, The Guardian describing it as "a brilliant, sophisticated, low-key show" and "as smart and original as it is sad and funny", The Mirror as an "understated, subtle and very clever comedy", Heat as "The best new comedy on the BBC for a long time" and the Financial Times felt that it "attained the same balance of tenderness and acuity that has characterised so many of the greatest British sitcoms, from Porridge to The Office".

Home Time was also nominated for Best Sitcom at both the 2010 South Bank Show Awards and The Rose D'Or.

== DVD release ==
Home Time DVD released on 22 August 2011.
