= Newsjack =

Satirical sketch show on BBC Radio

- Genre: Satire; Sketch comedy
- Running time: 30 minutes
- Country of origin: United Kingdom
- Language: English
- Home station: BBC Radio 7 (series 1–4); BBC Radio 4 Extra (series 5-24)
- Starring: Miles Jupp (series 1-4); Justin Edwards (series 5-9); Romesh Ranganathan (series 10-11); Nish Kumar (series 12-15); Angela Barnes (series 16-19); Kiri Pritchard-McLean (series 20-24)
- Produced by: Suzy Grant; Hayley Sterling; Leila Navabi; Gwyn Rhys Davies
- Recording studio: BBC Radio Theatre
- Original release: 4 June 2009 – 18 March 2021
- No. of series: 24 + pilot + specials
- No. of episodes: 134
- Audio format: Stereo
- Website: www.bbc.co.uk/programmes/b00kvs8r
- Podcast: www.bbc.co.uk/programmes/b00kvs8r/episodes/downloads

Newsjack is a British satirical sketch show which was broadcast on BBC Radio 4 Extra between 2009 and 2021. It was hosted by Miles Jupp (2009-Mar 2011), Justin Edwards (Sep 2011–2013), Romesh Ranganathan (2014), Nish Kumar (2015–2016), Angela Barnes (2017–2018) and Kiri Pritchard-McLean (2019–2021). It was first broadcast on 4 June 2009. The series was notable for having an "Open door" policy on writing, advertising itself as "the scrapbook sketch show written entirely by the Great British public" meaning that unsolicited writers without contract to the BBC could send in material. The show was designed to give new writers an opportunity to get material broadcast. It was hoped by the people behind the show that it would be a modern version of Week Ending, an earlier sketch show which also accepted material the same way. Most shows were recorded in front of a live audience at the BBC Radio Theatre in Broadcasting House.

== Format ==
Each episode of Newsjack began with an introduction from the presenter before the main sketches. The host was joined by a different cast each week - a mixture of experienced sketch performers and new upcoming talent. Previous regular cast members included: Margaret Cabourn-Smith (who also stood in as host for Series 9 Episode 6 when regular host Justin Edwards was unable to attend the recording), Lewis MacLeod, Pippa Evans, Andi Osho and Jess Robinson. Philip Fox appeared in several episodes, whilst Cariad Lloyd and Mike Wozniak have also appeared in the supporting cast.

As well as standalone sketches, the show also featured recurring segments such as Breaking News and Number Crunchers.

- Breaking News: A one-liner linked to a current news story.
- Number Crunchers: A joke with a statistical set-up and punchline. This segment was introduced in series 16 and has also been referred to as "Number Breakdown" and "Number Crunching".

Writers wishing to submit material for Newsjack were invited to write material for these segments as well as their own sketches not related to them.

Other recurring segments included:

- The Newsjack App: Mock answerphone messages. These were designed so that writers can create one-liners and other kinds of quick jokes.
- From the Archive: The show looks at a (fictional) programme from the past to see how news stories similar to those of today were covered in the past.
- Julia: a woman called Julia has been locked in a room, which symbolises the dark world of petty journalism, e.g.: reporting on the wedding of Zara Philips. As a result, she has become psychotic, longing to see sunlight; upon which the presenter shuts the door on her desperate pleas.
- Newsjack Films: Spoof movie trailers.
- Celebrity Diary: The cast impersonate a celebrity and see recent events from their viewpoint.
- Corrections: At the end of the programme, the cast read out made-up corrections relating to things from the previous episode.
- Viewsjack: One-liners in the style of a vox-pop interview answer.
- And Finally: A post-credits sequence where the show pretends the current episode is an old show and make jokes about how the world might have changed since the programme went out.
- Newsjackpedia: Introduced in series 19. Spoof entries for an online encyclopedia.

The programme was recorded in front of a studio audience and broadcast the following day.

== Production ==
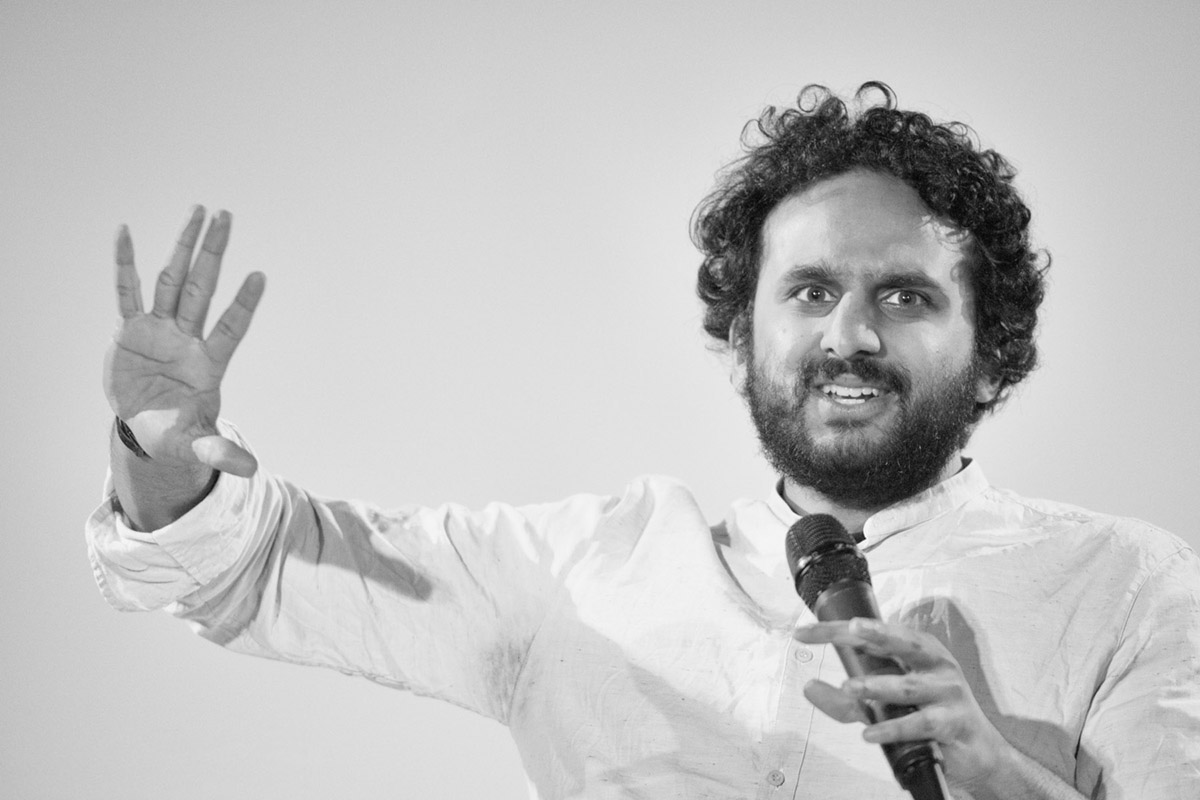
Nish Kumar in January 2016

Newsjack, was always intended to be an "Open door" show in terms of writing. However, it first became known in early 2009 when it launched a competition to find new comedy writers for the show. The winners of this competition went on to a masterclass on comedy writing with David Mitchell on 9 March 2009. Although originally Gareth Edwards was intended to be producer for the show, the job of producer eventually went to Tilusha Ghelani and Sam Michell. Later producers included Hayley Sterling and Leila Navabi. The show was first broadcast as a pilot on 4 June 2009. This pilot was broadcast first so as to give a guide to new writers about the sort of material that the programme was looking for. The first deadline for new material was 15 June 2009 at noon. While the first series was originally intended to run for ten weeks, this was reduced to the pilot and six episodes, one per week. In total there were twenty-four series and two compilation episodes: a review of the year episode, broadcast on New Year's Eve 2011, and shortly before series eight, a programme 'Newsjack Revisited' broadcast on Radio 4, featuring the best sketches from previous series seven. The episodes were also available to download as a podcast.

Transmission dates are as follows. The programme is normally broadcast on a Thursday evening on BBC Radio 4 Extra and repeated the following Sunday.

- Pilot: 4 June 2009
- Series 1: 18 June 2009 – 23 July 2009
- Series 2: 7 January 2010 – 11 February 2010
- Series 3: 17 June 2010 – 22 July 2010
- Series 4: 10 February 2011 – 17 March 2011
- Series 5: 15 September 2011 – 20 October 2011
- The Newsjack Review of the Year (compilation from series 4 & 5): 31 December 2011
- Series 6: 23 February 2012 – 29 March 2012
- Series 7: 20 September 2012 – 25 October 2012
- Newsjack Revisited (compilation from series 7, broadcast on BBC Radio 4): 13 February 2013
- Series 8: 14 February 2013 – 21 March 2013
- Series 9: 19 September 2013 – 24 October 2013
- Series 10: 6 March 2014 – 10 April 2014
- Series 11: 25 September 2014 – 30 October 2014
- Series 12: 26 February 2015 – 2 April 2015
- Series 13: 9 September 2015 – 14 October 2015
- Series 14: 11 February 2016 – 17 March 2016
- Series 15: 8 September 2016 – 13 October 2016
- Series 16: 26 January 2017 – 2 March 2017
- Series 17: 14 September 2017 - 19 October 2017
- Series 18: 8 February 2018 - 18 March 2018
- Series 19: 13 September 2018 - 18 October 2018
- Series 20: 7 February 2019 - 14 March 2019
- Series 21: 12 September 2019 - 17 October 2019
- Series 22: 13 February 2020 - 19 March 2020
- Series 23: 24 September 2020 - 29 October 2020
- Series 24: 25 February 2021 - 18 March 2021

The final episode of series 22 (broadcast on 19 March 2020) was recorded at the BBC Radio Theatre without a studio audience, as the recording was subject to restrictions caused by the COVID-19 pandemic in England. Series 23 was recorded remotely, without a laugh track. Series 24 is scheduled to be recorded remotely, in front of a Zoom audience.

== Awards ==
Newsjack won the Rose d'Or for best Radio Comedy in 2015.

== See also ==
- Tilt (radio)
