= Neil Edmond =

British actor and comedy writer

- Born: December 1970 (age 55); Shrewsbury, England
- Notable work: The Consultants; Knocker; Home Time

Comedy career
- Medium: Television, radio

Neil Edmond (born December 1970) is a British actor and comedy writer.

Neil was a member of the comedic sketch trio The Consultants, alongside James Rawlings and Justin Edwards. In 2002 they won the Perrier award for Best Newcomer at the Edinburgh Fringe Festival. The Consultants went on to record four series for BBC Radio 4 between 2002 and 2005. He wrote and performed radio sitcom Knocker for BBC 7's and contributed to two series of Bigipedia. In 2012 he appeared as beleaguered emergency architect Mike Whitaker in Twenty Twelve.

Edmond has also been known to perform solo character work, with his Space School headmaster and Market Researcher being particular live favourites. He was a regular stooge for the late Ken Campbell (1941–2008), is an ex-member of sketch group The Benders, is a frequent volunteer at Scene & Heard, played 'Ian' in interactive web comedy Where are the Joneses? and provides improvised 'interpretative dance' accompaniment for readings of horror novels and the poetry of Danielle Steel at Robin Ince's Book Club.

Home Time, co-written with Emma Fryer, was nominated for Best Sitcom at both the 2010 South Bank Show Awards and The Rose D'Or.

In 2019 he played the recurring character of Ian in the Martin Clunes sitcom Warren on BBC1.
