= The Consultants =

British comedy sketch team

The Consultants are a comedy sketch team who first reached public prominence in August 2002 when they won the Perrier Best Newcomer Award at the Edinburgh Fringe.

The team, consisting of Neil Edmond, Justin Edwards and James Rawlings, have since recorded four series of comedy shows, also named The Consultants, on BBC Radio 4, featuring an eclectic mix of songs, puns and sketches.

== Series list ==
=== Series one ===
| No. overall | No. in series | Summary | Original release date |
|---|---|---|---|
| 1 | 1 | A lifestyle presentation conference - and sketch show, with Neil Edmond | 13 February 2003 |
| 2 | 2 | The team ponder how to revamp tea to make it more dangerous and exciting. | 20 February 2003 |
| 3 | 3 | The team tackle an unusual case of sexual harassment. | 27 February 2003 |
| 4 | 4 | The team wonder why so many men went to 'mow a meadow'. | 6 March 2003 |

=== Series two ===
| No. overall | No. in series | Summary | Original release date |
|---|---|---|---|
| 5 | 1 | Chesney ends a hostile takeover using marriage. | 20 November 2003 |
| 6 | 2 | A complaint about a wonky pram turns serious. | 27 November 2003 |
| 7 | 3 | When warding off dark lords, salad is acceptable. | 4 December 2003 |
| 8 | 4 | Taking register at stunt school, and Tarzan learns the alphabet. | 11 December 2003 |
| 9 | 5 | The Adventure-Bakers make a time-strudel and travel through history. | 18 December 2003 |
| 10 | 6 | Crossword challenges and dinner with the devil. | 26 May 2004 |

=== Series three ===
| No. overall | No. in series | Summary | Original release date |
|---|---|---|---|
| 11 | 1 | Chesney fixes the alphabet, which has a leaky 'e'. | 14 December 2004 |
| 12 | 2 | Chesney throws a festive party for his colleagues. | 21 December 2004 |
| 13 | 3 | Chesney brings his daughter to work. Or does he? | 28 December 2004 |
| 14 | 4 | The boys of St Battery's get their own back on the school bully. | 4 January 2005 |
| 15 | 5 | Chesney is having a crisis of confidence. | 11 January 2005 |
| 16 | 6 | Unisex barbers and wrong telephone numbers. | 18 January 2005 |

=== Series four ===
| No. overall | No. in series | Summary | Original release date |
|---|---|---|---|
| 17 | 1 | The lighthouse tour and the old-fashioned parents. | 18 October 2005 |
| 18 | 2 | Award-winning comedy from Justin 'Lofty' Edwards, Neil 'Professor' Edmond and James 'Shortstop' Rawling. | 25 October 2005 |
| 19 | 3 | Galileo is too busy to party with the Pope. | 1 November 2005 |
| 20 | 4 | A 'ladies man' sings about his suspect personal hygiene. | 8 November 2005 |
| 21 | 5 | Two travellers stumble upon a very unusual pub quiz. | 15 November 2005 |
| 22 | 6 | Inoculation against old age leads to unusual results. | 22 November 2005 |

== BBC Audiobooks Release ==
Released in 2003 (Cat no. 056352345x) which contains the first four episodes of the first series.
