= Big Strides =

Multi-genre London band

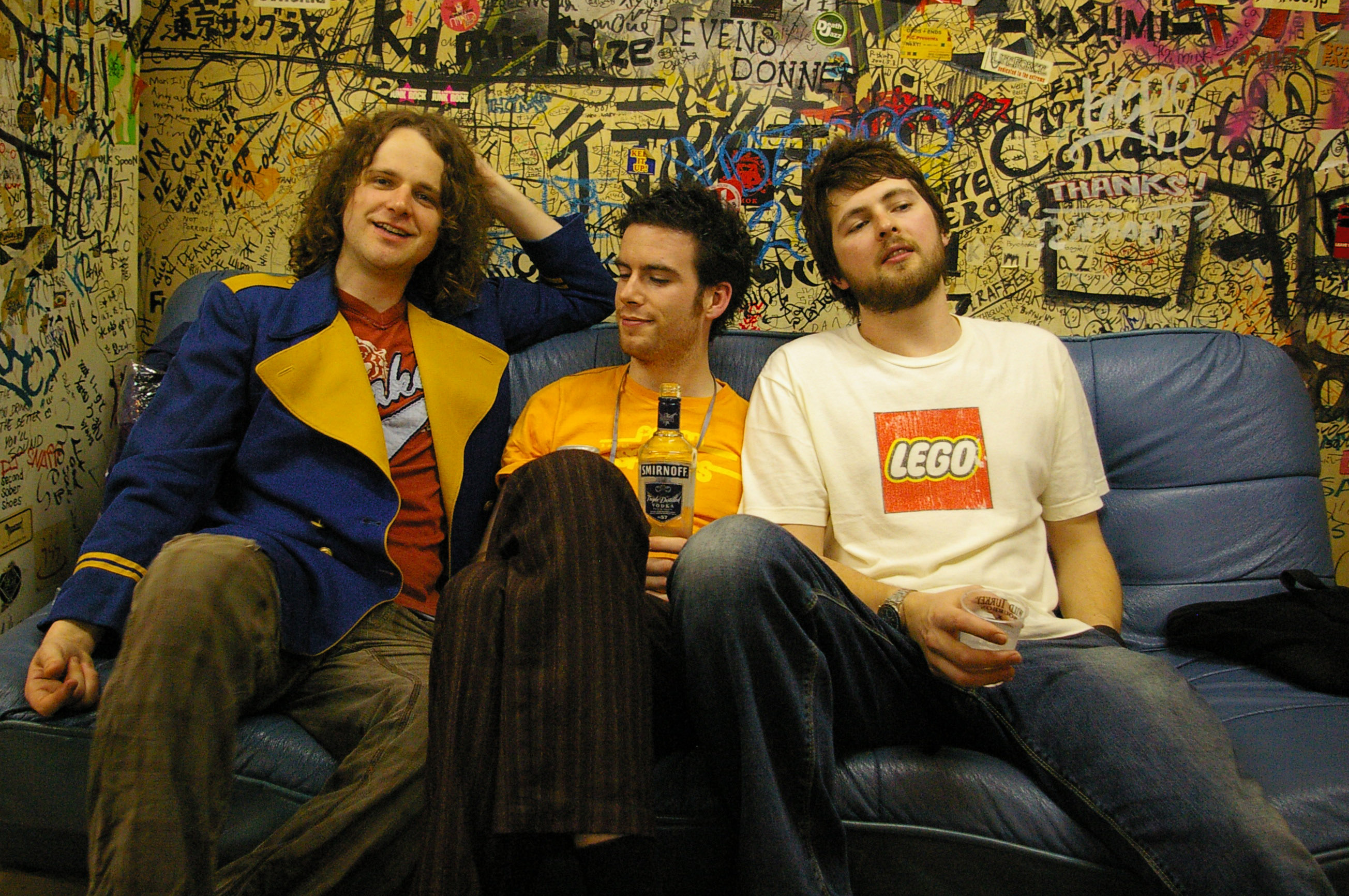

Background information
- Origin: London, England
- Genres: Indie; Blues-rock; Funk rock
- Years active: 2003–present
- Labels: Tall Order Records; EMI (Japan); India/Rough Trade (Germany)
- Members: Lewis Kirk; Marcus O'Neill; Chris Kelly
- Past members: Tom Pi
- Website: Official website

Big Strides is a London-based 3-piece band that plays an original mix of blues, rock, jazz and funk. With an original lineup consisting of Marcus O'Neill (vocals, guitar, harmonica), Lewis Kirk (drums) and Tom Pi (double bass), Chris Kelly replaced Tom Pi as double bassist in 2006.

Their first album Small Town, Big Strides was released in 2005 on their own label, Tall Order Records. The first single "Suicidal" notched up 300,000 downloads in the US and prompted Jonathan Ross on BBC Radio 2 to comment "I can't decide if I love it or if it upsets me".

After regular appearances at Ronnie Scott's, tours of the UK and performances at Glastonbury, They signed to management Brett_Leboff at Monumental Management Ltd from 2006 to 2011 and first went to Japan in 2006 to play at Summer Sonic, following a sudden rush of import album sales. Their second album "Cry It All Out" was picked up for release in Japan (EMI) and Germany (India Media/ Rough Trade).

The breadth and variety of Big Strides' influences has seen them support a wide range of artists including Roy Ayers, Horace Andy, Damien Rice, Bloc Party and Arctic Monkeys.

== Discography ==
=== Albums ===
Album information
Small Town, Big Strides
- Released: 6 June 2005 (UK) 4 April 2007 (Japan)
- Produced by Dan Swift
- Singles: "Suicidal", "I Do Not Fear Jazz"
Cry It All Out
- Released: 25 September 2006 (UK) 4 October 2006 (Japan)
- Produced by Dan Swift
- Singles: "Let's Get Nice", "Smiling", "Always Together", "Whisky"
Super Custom Limited
- Released: 17 November 2008 (UK)
- Produced by Dan Swift
- Singles: "Hen Night Limousine (Digital Only)",

=== Singles ===
Single information
Suicidal
- Released: Radiotone 29 November 2004 (UK)
- Other Tracks: "Carfire", "Back to the Lemon"
I Do Not Fear Jazz
- Released: Tall Order Records 19 September 2005 (UK)
- Other Tracks: "Cookies — Donald's Theme ", "Better (Live at Shepherds Bush Empire)", "Bob Weissfeldner's Album Trailer "
Let's Get Nice
- Released: Tall Order Records 27 March 2006 (UK)
- Other Tracks: "Brudenell Groove", "Sad Songs"
Smiling (Big Strides song)|Smiling
- Released: Tall Order Records 11 September 2006 (UK)
- Other Tracks: "Seeya Then", "1000 Sleeps"
Always Together
- Released: Tall Order Records 26 February 2007 (UK)
- Other Tracks: "What's Wrong With Lucy", "Soundcheck Bitch"
She Drinks Whisky
- Released: Tall Order Records 9 July 2007 (UK)
- Other Tracks: "Winter Sunlight", "Sour Cream"
Hen Night Limousine
- Released: Tall Order Records 17 November 2008 (UK)
