= Nick Doody =

British stand-up comedian (born 1972)

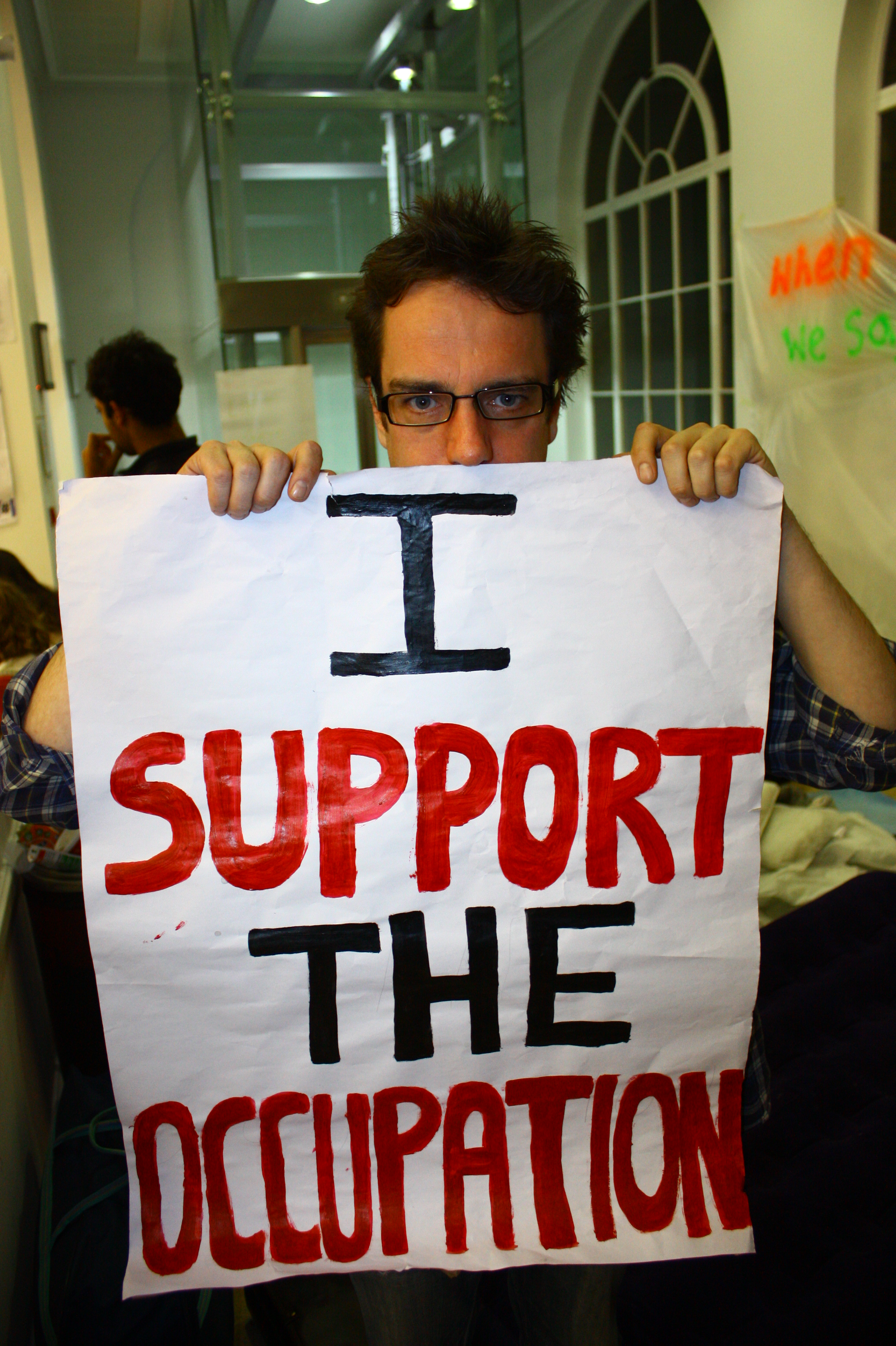
Nick Doody at UCL occupation 2010

Nick Doody is a British stand-up comedian.

Doody featured as a guest on vox-pop television shows and radio broadcasts such as Political Animal. He wrote for the television series FAQ U, featured on The Mark Thomas Comedy Product, and was a finalist on Channel Four's 1997 So You Think You're Funny competition. He was commissioned to write a study of American comedian Bill Hicks, Telling the Truth, Laughing: The Life and Works of Bill Hicks following his gigging with Hicks in 1992.

In 2006 Doody performed his first solo Edinburgh Show Before He Kills Again and made an appearance at Download festival. He has appeared on The Comic Side of 7 Days on BBC Three, and has written for 8 out of 10 Cats, The Late Edition (BBC Four), The Now Show (BBC Radio 4), Armando Iannucci's Charm Offensive (BBC Radio 4). He appeared on The World Stands Up for BBC America and Paramount in the UK, and on Edinburgh and Beyond, also for Paramount. He was creator and head writer of Bigipedia, which broadcast in 2009 and 2011 on BBC Radio 4.

He took his second solo show Hypocrite to the Edinburgh Festival in 2007. and continued to perform regular shows at the Fringe.

Doody supported Dave Gorman in his latest 2018 tour With Great PowerPoint Comes Great ResponsibilityPoint.
