= Armando Iannucci's Charm Offensive =

- Genre: Comedy
- Running time: 30 minutes
- Country of origin: United Kingdom
- Language: English
- Home station: BBC Radio 4
- Created by: Armando Iannucci
- Produced by: David Tyler
- Original release: 2005 (BBC Radio 4) – 2008
- No. of episodes: 24 (4 series)
- Website: Armando Iannucci's Charm Offensive

Armando Iannucci's Charm Offensive is a British radio comedy programme broadcast on BBC Radio 4 first broadcast in 2005 with a second series in 2006, a third in 2007 and a fourth in 2008. Series 2, 3 and 4 of the show were broadcast in the popular Friday evening slot, which it has shared with The News Quiz and The Now Show. It is hosted by comedian Armando Iannucci and each week a panel of fellow comedians make satirical and surreal observations on current events. Vaughan Savidge provides voice overs.

Guests have included Will Smith (also co-writer) and Clive Anderson (six presences), Phill Jupitus, Jo Brand, Dave Gorman, Simon Evans and Mark Watson (three presences).

In April 2007, Series 2 was awarded a Sony Radio Award in the comedy category. The judges said: "Making comedy programmes out of current affairs topics is a well-populated genre. The judges felt that this was a great example of brilliant observation with surreal twists, taking the listener on an unpredictable journey and bringing a fresh slant to the format."

The shows writers include Armando Iannucci, Nick Doody, Ian Martin, Sean Gray, Dan Tetsell, Will Smith and Jon Holmes. Produced by David Tyler, it was a Pozzitive production for the BBC.

== Guests ==
Guests in the first series (May–June 2005) have been Alexei Sayle, Andy Zaltzman, Chris Langham, Clive Anderson, Dave Gorman, David Mitchell, Jo Brand, John Oliver, John Sessions, Lucy Porter, Marcus Brigstocke, Mark Steel, Phill Jupitus, Will Smith.

In the second (June–July 2006): Alexei Sayle, Chris Addison, Clive Anderson, Dan Gaster, Dave Gorman, Jack Dee, Jo Brand, Jo Caulfield, Mark Watson, Natalie Haynes, Phill Jupitus, Simon Evans, Stewart Lee, Will Smith.

In the third (August–September 2007): Andy Zaltzman, Clive Anderson, Dara Ó Briain, Dave Gorman, David Cross, David Quantick, Jack Dee, Jo Brand, Justin Edwards, Mark Watson, Michael McIntyre, Phill Jupitus, Rich Hall, Russell Howard, Simon Evans, Stewart Lee, Will Smith.

In the fourth (August–September 2008): Andy Parsons, Andy Zaltzman, Chris Addison, Dara Ó Briain, Dave Gorman, David Mitchell, David Quantick, Justin Edwards, Lucy Porter, Marcus Brigstock, Matt Kirshen, Miranda Hart, Phill Jupitus, Robin Ince, Simon Evans, Will Smith.

== See also ==
- Charm offensive
