= Wil Hodgson =

British comedian

- Born: 1978 (age 47–48); Bath, Somerset, England
- Occupation: Comedian

Wil Hodgson (born 1978) is an English comedian. Hodgson is known for their fast and almost monotone delivery which, along with their bizarre persona, has been known to divide audiences. they are also known for their bright pink hair (until recently, a mohican) and their love of 1980s toys such as Care Bears and My Little Pony.

== Career ==
They have lived in Chippenham their whole life and began performing comedy in 2003. Prior to this, they had worked part-time as a lecturer at Wiltshire College and had a stint training to be a wrestler during which they participated in 30-man "Battle Royals".

Hodgson's Edinburgh Festival shows have largely consisted of stand up material about their lifestyle and opinions combined with lengthy monologues about "The Red Team" a possibly fictional primary school sports day team made up of outcasts and misfits and their daily battles with the bullying "Green Team". Hodgson's material tends towards autobiography rather than straight observation.

In 2004, they won a Perrier Award for Best Newcomer at the Edinburgh Festival Fringe.

They supported Ian Cognito on his national tour in 2005 and began their own national tour in January 2007. They supported Mark Thomas on some dates of his "It's The Stupid Economy Tour".

In December 2010, Hodgson filmed a cameo appearance in the independent feature film, What Happened After Macbeth directed by Jack Doyle which had been intended for release in 2013. The film also features cameos from stand-up comedians Seymour Mace and Des Sharples.

== Personal life ==
Hodgson is non-binary and uses they/them pronouns. Hodgson is also known for their material on women's bodies which they claim to be nature's greatest invention. They are vocal in their dislike of size zero models and airbrushed photos, expressing a preference for magazines such as Readers' Wives and for larger female celebrities such as Fern Britton and Liza Tarbuck.

Hodgson was a member of the Socialist Workers Party and the Anti Nazi League whilst a student at the University of Luton but claims to have no specific political allegiance besides their stance against racism, sexism and homophobia.

== DVDs ==
They have so far released three DVDs distributed by Go Faster Stripe.

- Skinheads, Readers' Wives and My Little Ponies
- Hatful of Hodgson
- Live on Bonfire Night

== Edinburgh Festival Fringe ==
- 2004 The Passion of the Hodgson (Perrier Best Newcomer Award)
- 2005 Good Wil Hodgson
- 2006 The Wil Hodgson Holiday Special
- 2007 Straight Outta Chippenham
- 2008 Chippenham on My Shoulder
- 2009 Punk Folk Tales
- 2010 Punkanory
