= BBC Radio 4 Extra =

British digital radio station

- Logo used since 2022
- United Kingdom
- Broadcast area: United Kingdom
- Frequencies: DAB: 12B BBC National DAB; Freesat: 708; Freeview: 708; Sky (UK only): 0123; Virgin Media: 910; Virgin Media Ireland: 929

Programming
- Language: English
- Format: Comedy; Drama; Entertainment

Ownership
- Owner: BBC
- Sister stations: BBC Radio 4

History
- Founded: 15 December 2002; 23 years ago (as BBC 7)
- First air date: 2 April 2011; 15 years ago (as BBC Radio 4 Extra)
- Last air date: Spring 2027 (planned)
- Former names: BBC 7 (2002–2008); BBC Radio 7 (2008–2011)

Technical information
- Licensing authority: Ofcom

Links
- Webcast: Listen live
- Website: www.bbc.co.uk/radio4extra

BBC Radio 4 Extra (formerly BBC Radio 7) is a British digital radio station owned and operated by the BBC. It mostly broadcasts archived repeats of comedy, drama and documentary programmes, and is the sister station of Radio 4. It is the principal broadcaster of the BBC's spoken-word archive, and as a result the majority of its programming originates from that archive. It also broadcasts extended and companion programmes to those broadcast on Radio 4, and provides a "catch-up" service for certain programmes.

The station launched in December 2002 as BBC 7, broadcasting a mix of archive comedy, drama and current children's radio. The station was renamed BBC Radio 7 in 2008, then relaunched as BBC Radio 4 Extra in April 2011.

According to RAJAR, the station broadcasts to a weekly audience of 1.4 million, who listen, on average, to 6.8 hours a week as of June 2026.

Radio 4 Extra is set to close in spring 2027.

== History ==
Former branding as BBC 7 (2002) and BBC Radio 7 (2008). Both featured a smiling face motif. The latter was created by design company Fallon.

=== BBC 7 ===
The station was initially launched as BBC 7 on 15 December 2002 by comedian Paul Merton. The first programme was broadcast at 8 p.m. and was simulcast with Radio 4. The station, referred to by the codename 'Network Z' while in development, was named without the word 'Radio' to reflect the station's presence on the internet and on digital television in addition to radio. The station broadcast mostly archived comedy and drama; such programmes either were three or more years old, or had been broadcast twice on their original station.

The station also broadcast a themed section for children's programmes. This section carried a variety of programmes, including The Little Toe Radio Show (later renamed CBeebies Radio), aimed at younger children and consisting of short serials, stories and rhymes, and The Big Toe Radio Show and Arthur Storey and the Department of Historical Correction with phone-ins, quizzes and stories for the 8+ age group. The segment also hosted the only news programme on the network presented by the Newsround team.

The station won the Sony Radio Academy Award for station sound in 2003, was nominated for the Promo Award in 2004, and in 2005 received a silver for the Short-Form award, plus nominations in the speech and digital terrestrial station-of-the-year sections. Because of the station's archive nature the station was scheduled, produced and researched by 17 people, excluding presenters.

The station was renamed on 4 October 2008 as BBC Radio 7 in an effort to bring it in line with other BBC Radio brands. It also coincided with the introduction of a new network logo for the station.

By adding some inviting new programmes and variations of some old favourites, we will encourage more listeners to find and enjoy what this imaginative digital station has to offer.

— Gwyneth Williams, controller of Radio 4 and Radio 4 Extra

During this later period, Radio 7 saw growth in its audience, with a growth rate of 9.5% annually in 2010, going from 931,000 listeners in the first quarter of that year to 949,000 a quarter later, making it the second most listened to BBC digital radio station at the time. However, despite this growth, the audience of children between 4 and 14 was reported to be only at 25,000, and in February 2011 the BBC Trust approved a reduction in hours dedicated to children from 1,400 to 350.

=== BBC Radio 4 Extra ===
The original BBC Radio 4 Extra logo, used in 2011

The BBC announced its intention to relaunch the station on 2 March 2010 and following a public consultation, the proposal was approved by the corporation's governing body the BBC Trust in February 2011. As a result, the station relaunched as BBC Radio 4 Extra on Saturday 2 April 2011. The relaunched station contained much of the same mix of programming with some new additions that reflected the new alignment with Radio 4, many of which were archive, or extensions or spin-offs of flagship Radio 4 programmes.

On 26 May 2022, as part of planned cuts and streamlining with a greater focus on digital, the BBC announced plans to discontinue Radio 4 Extra as a broadcast station. It would have been supplanted by BBC Sounds.

On 20 October 2026, the BBC announced that Radio 4 Extra is to close in spring 2027 as part of the broadcaster's drive to save £500 million over the next two years. Most of its programmes, including The Daily Service, will be supplanted by BBC Sounds.

== Broadcast ==
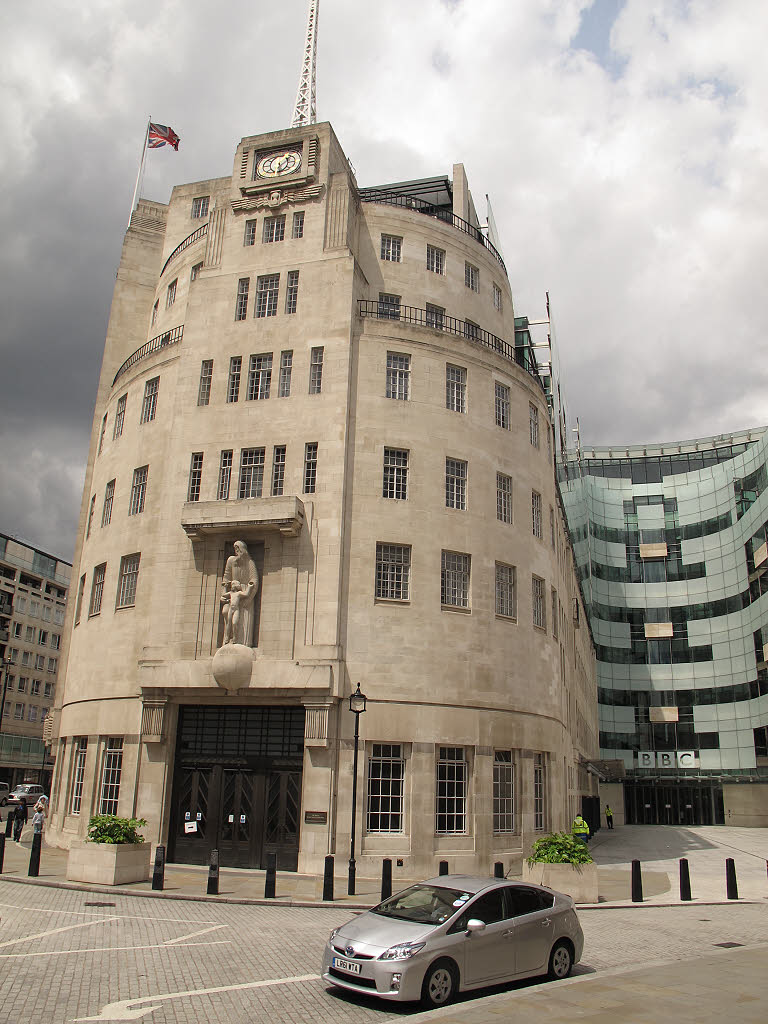
BBC Radio 4 Extra originates from Broadcasting House in central London.

BBC Radio 4 Extra is broadcast from Broadcasting House in central London, although due to the nature of the channel very little of the channel's content is broadcast live from there; even the continuity announcements are pre-recorded. The channel uses around twelve regular continuity announcers to link between programmes. Current announcers include Wes Butters, Kathy Clugston, Jim Lee, David Miles, Joanna Pinnock, Neil Sleat, Amanda Litherland, Arlene Fleming, Ron Brown, Alan Smith, Chris Berrow and Steve Urquhart. Previous presenters, including those presenting Radio 7, include Zeb Soanes, Penny Haslam, Helen Aitken, Rory Morrison, Susan Rae, Alex Riley and Michaela Saunders.

The station is broadcast nationally on digital radio – via the BBC National DAB multiplex – and online via BBC Sounds and other services such as Radioplayer. It is also available on a number of digital television platforms; Freeview, Virgin Media, Freesat and Sky.

Until 2019 the controller of the station, who is answerable to the Radio board in the BBC, was Gwyneth Williams. BBC Radio 4 Extra is broadcast in stereo on television and online, although many of the older archive programmes were only recorded in mono. On DAB, all programmes are broadcast in mono, as the maximum bit rate is only 80 kbps.

== Programming ==
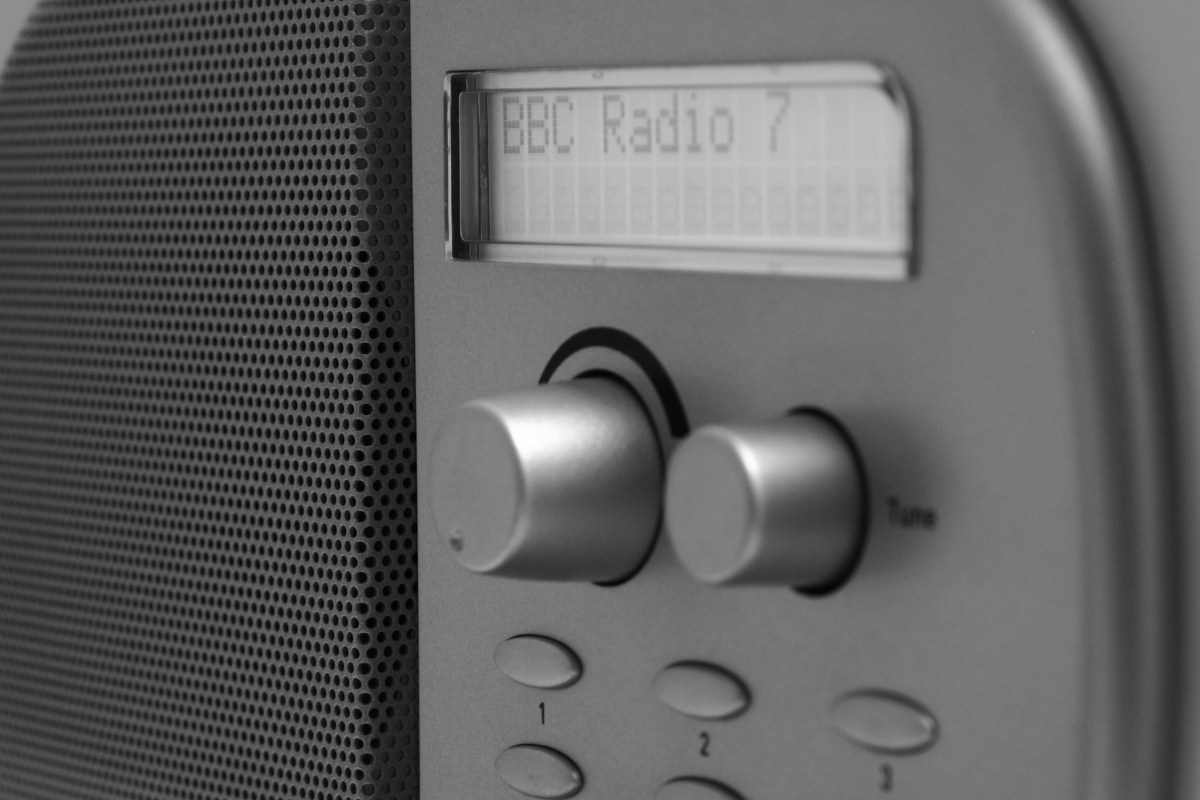
BBC Radio 7 playing

Although the current station is a rebranding of Radio 7 and contains a similar mix of archived programming, content has been brought further in line with BBC Radio 4 with new additions based upon the schedule of that station. These include Desert Island Discs, the broadcast of archived editions of the latter being titled as Desert Island Discs Revisited. This programming has also previously included extended versions of programmes such as The News Quiz and The Now Show, plus Ambridge Extra, a more youth-orientated version of long-running radio soap The Archers.

Some programming is organised into programme blocks of similar programmes. The late night Comedy Club segment broadcasts "two hours of contemporary comedy" most nights of the week and is primarily hosted by Arthur Smith. A long-standing segment that remained following the change from Radio 7, it was previously fronted by Alex Riley and Phil Williams. Comedy previously available as CDs on the Laughing Stock label is also broadcast.

Drama is also broadcast, notably in The 7th Dimension segment. A long-running segment continued from Radio 7, the block airs speculative fiction, science fiction, fantasy and horror stories presented by Nicholas Briggs. The segment contains programmes including Doctor Who audio dramas starring Paul McGann as the Eighth Doctor, as well as programmes imported from overseas including American broadcasts The Twilight Zone and Garrison Keillor's Radio Show as well as Stuart McLean's Vinyl Cafe from Canada. The 7th Dimension was originally broadcast daily, but has now been reduced to weekends-only. With increasing repeats of old Radio 4 documentaries, interviews and "educational/cultural" programmes, some listeners are concerned that the station's original mandate to provide comedy, drama and entertainment is being increasingly sidelined.

=== Archive ===
Much of the channel's schedule is formed of repeats from classic comedy and drama. The schedule spans The Goon Show (1950s) and Round the Horne (1960s), through Radio 2 favourites like The News Huddlines, Castle's on the Air and Listen to Les, to recent Radio 4 shows such as Little Britain and Dead Ringers. Some of this content is newly discovered, such as copies of the version of Dick Barton Special Agent that was made for international distribution, and early episodes of The Goon Show.

=== Original programmes ===
The station has broadcast original programmes. Newsjack is a topical news sketch show which encourages contributions from listeners. Spanking New on Seven was stand-up comedy, and the BBC New Comedy Competition a competition for new comedians. Those who went on to have their own series on Radio 7 include John-Luke Roberts with Spats and Miriam Elia with A Series of Psychotic Episodes.

The Mitch Benn Music Show features comedy songs introduced by Mitch Benn. The Colin and Fergus' Digi Radio comedy sketch show ran for two series in 2005–2006. Serious About Comedy is a weekly show presented by Robin Ince in which comedians and comedy critics discussed comedy television, radio, DVDs, and films. Tilt is a satirical look at the week's news of views other than the norm. Knocker is a sitcom about a market researcher, written by and starring Neil Edmond.

From April 2024, Yesterday In Parliament and The Daily Service both moved to the station as part of the end of separate scheduling for Radio 4's long wave service, in advance of the planned future closure of long wave. However, Yesterday in Parliament returned to Radio 4 on 24 March 2025.

==== Original Radio 7 programmes ====
While most shows on Radio 7 were repeats, original programmes included:

- Big Toe Books (Children's show)
- Serious About Comedy (Comedy review show)
- Tilt (Satirical sketch comedy)
- Newsjack (Satirical sketch comedy)
- Spats (Sketch comedy)
- Knocker (Sitcom)
- The Penny Dreadfuls Present… (Comedy)
- Undone (Sci-fi comedy)
- The Spaceship (Sci-fi comedy)
- Oneira (Sci-fi comedy)
- The Laxian Key (Sci-fi comedy)
- Cold Blood (Sci-fi drama)
- The Voice of God (Sci-fi drama)
- Slipstream (Sci-fi drama)
- A Series of Psychotic Episodes (Sketch comedy)
- CBeebies Radio (Children's show)
- Colin and Fergus' Digi Radio (Sketch comedy)
- No Tomatoes (Sketch comedy)
- The Mitch Benn Music Show (Musical comedy)
- Spanking New on Seven (Stand-up)
- Play and Record (Sketch comedy)
- Pleased to Meet You (Comedy)
- Gus Murdoch's Sacred Cows (Comedy)
- Planet B (Sci-fi drama)
- Doctor Who: The Eighth Doctor Adventures (Sci-fi Drama)
- The Man in Black (Horror)
- The Scarifyers (Horror comedy)
- This is Pulp Fiction (Crime fiction)

==== Original Radio 4 Extra programmes ====
Original programmes made for Radio 4 Extra:

- Ambridge Extra (Soap opera, spin-off from The Archers)
- Arthur Smith's Balham Bash (Variety show, debuted on Radio 4 Extra before being aired on Radio 4)
- The 4 O'Clock Show (Chat show, including children's entertainment)
- Let's Get Quizzical (Documentary)
- Lord of the Flies (dramatisation of William Golding's novel)
- Meet David Sedaris (Comedy, debuted on Radio 4 Extra before being aired on Radio 4)
- The Nine Billion Names of God (readings from Arthur C. Clarke's short story collection of the same name)
- Sarah Millican's Support Group (Sketch show, debuted on Radio 4 Extra before being aired on Radio 4)
- What's So Funny? (Comedy review show)
- Neverwhere (Neil Gaiman's fantasy, first episode aired on Radio 4 with subsequent episodes on Radio 4 Extra)

== See also ==
- List of BBC radio stations
