= Broken News =

Television series

- Genre: News satire
- Created by: John Morton, Tony Roche
- Directed by: John Morton
- Country of origin: United Kingdom
- Original language: English
- No. of series: 1
- No. of episodes: 6 (list of episodes)

Production
- Executive producer: Jon Plowman
- Producer: Paul Schlesinger
- Running time: 30 minutes

Original release
- Network: BBC Two
- Release: 31 October – 6 December 2005

Broken News is a comedy programme shown on BBC Two in late 2005. The show poked fun at the world of 24-hour rolling news channels. The title of the show is a play on the phrase "breaking news". It had six thirty-minute episodes. Having previously worked on programmes such as People Like Us and The Sunday Format, the show's production team worked closely with writer and director John Morton.

The show jump cut between its various spoof TV channels, which covered both the central story and other stories that would be of interest to their audience. A large part of the comedy came from observations about the nature of news presentation rather than the stories themselves.

The programme centred on Britain's addiction to 24-hour news channels. Each week, Broken News looked at a fictitious news story such as "Tomato Flu". Its massive cast of 145 actors played newsreaders and reporters on different networks.

It was released on DVD Region 2 on 12 June 2006.

== The featured networks ==
The programme featured mainly the following fictitious networks:

- Aronovitz Business News. This business and financial news station featured onscreen graphics similar in style to Bloomberg Television. Most of the screen is taken up by graphs and stock-tickers (showing prices of nonexistent stocks such as "Unicorn hooves") with only a small window where Gary Mills (Kevin Day) and Mitchell Oatis (Roger Barclay) tend to argue with rather 'colourful' similes ("Well, Marks and Spencer are leading investors up the garden path yet again. Why do we have to say 'Yes, we love the underwear and the food'? Why not merge them to make edible underwear?") . Some of the smaller graphics transition by spinning around on a regular basis, and sometimes the studio window spins, as an extra joke.
- ESN News is an example of style over content where news is forever coming up but never arrives ("Still to come, a round-up of the reminders of the news still to come."). Largely based on the ITV News Channel and Sky News, with a rolling news ticker, two newscasters Katie Tate (Sharon Horgan) and Richard Pritchard (Duncan Duff) at a desk at the front of the studio. Melanie Bellamy (Indira Varma) delivers the "standing news" to a large screen at the back of the studio, displaying slightly nauseating floating graphics. The station has a reporter embedded with the crew of the International Space Station, Nick Burnham (Darren Boyd), who is inevitably miles away from the news. He therefore exaggerates all stories to make the situation seem as dire as possible ("We have been informed that up a third of our supplies contain Tomatoids, and we've already eaten half!"). The first and last names of the channels' reporters sound almost alike, such as Nicholas Nicklaus, Amanda Panda and Alison Ellison, a running gag on the channel. The station also reads out ill-informed text messages sent in by viewers ("Everyone keeps passing the buck for this problem – I blame society", "I'm not a Nazi sympathiser, but why don't we ever sympathise with them?") and performs phone polls ("Are children all criminals? Yes: 104%, No: 103%).
- Film and Movie News features interviews with all the star names in the movie industry, similar in style to Jonathan Ross hosted Film programme. Joe Reed (Tom Goodman-Hill) is the resident presenter and film critic (and part-time lecturer in Film Studies at the University of Bournemouth), who flatters film stars during interviews – and then berates their performances in reviews ("I thought I was going to vomit so hard, my liquified kidneys would be forced out of my nose" and "If you see this train-wreck of a movie, you will feel the overwhelming desire to rip out your eyes and force them up into your ears, just so you can't see or hear this film.").
- GO Sports 1 is a sports news channel in the style of Sky Sports News, featuring bizarre stats on the right hand side of the screen such as which Premiership club owns the most Dido CDs and who are the top football lovers this season. The main anchors are Kevin Peters (James Howard) and Natalie Gosling (Joanna Bobin), with Guy Baston (Tom Goodman-Hill) as reporter ("Manchester United have denied that starting other Manchester Uniteds in China, Japan, Australia, the US, Scotland, Wales and London would make the club any less unique or be in the least bit confusing"). The channel also runs several other channels (GO Sports 1 2 to GO Sports 1 5) which show non-stop match buildup, post match analysis, repeats and multiangle interactive repeats of all the big matches.
- IBS News is an American news channel that appears to be a parody of Fox News. The station's newsreaders, Anthony Markowitz (Colin Stinton) and Julia Regan (Claudia Christian), give long pieces of opinion after every topic, often using the phrases 'I'm no expert' or 'I don't pretend to know much about this, but...'. Anthony tends to give colloquial, ill-informed opinion ("When you flush the toilet on an aeroplane, do you ever think about where it goes? I sure don't!"), while Julia gives incredibly political commentary on the outcome ("Imagine the effect this will have on the already strict aviation guidelines in force"). They then inevitably link the story, however tenuously, to the weather report ("No more frozen urine falling from the sky, but expect rain over North Carolina"). It also covers the "Vincenti Trial", a parody of the Michael Jackson and O. J. Simpson trials, where the main defendant is accused of murdering his wife who was having affairs with three different women in three hotels in three states simultaneously while technically dead ("Of course whether or not this is even possible has to be considered a legal nicety").
- Look Out East is a mish-mash of regional UK news programmes (the name is a parody of BBC Look East). They lead with banal stories ("Man has teeth stolen!") and feature banter between the urbane hosts, Phil Curdridge (Kim Wall) and Sarah Holt (Carli Norris), and the mild-mannered weather presenter Russ (Phil Nice). Invariably the conversation veers off and ends up discussing some smutty topic ("The closest was the time we visited a Portuguese nudist beach! That's the time my daughter was conceived, I think..."), with a subtext that is usually at the expense of Russ. All these end with "Let's not go there" or "Honestly, boys...".
- PVS News, the earnest, no-frills network. The set, presentation, and on screen graphics mirror that of BBC News 24. The main anchors are Adam Lockwood (Steve Toussaint) and Frances Walsh (Clare Wille) (reportedly born within minutes of each other and have been indistinguishable ever since) whose running gag is to complete each other's words and sentences. The station features live links to various locations, with international correspondent Will Parker (Benedict Cumberbatch). The station uses poor quality live satellite links to locations where events have not occurred yet ("Donald Rumsfeld is very much his own man, and people here are talking about what he will not say as much as what he will say when he does turn up. He will probably not say what we expect him to say, because that's not his style") and covers unimportant stories too, just to fill up the time ("Due to a debate between TV producers and librarians, news channels cannot shoot new footage of libraries. These library pictures were shot months ago.") The field reporters often ask the main anchors "What more can you tell us" – a complete role reversal.
- SO News claims to supply everything you ever wanted to know about the world of celebrity, similar in style to BBC Three's now defunct Liquid News. Presented by Claudia van Sant (Lucy Porter) and Colin Kay (Philip Brodie), the channel leads with vapid gossip on various celebrities, with an incredibly camp American reporter live in Los Angeles, Josh Cashman (Phil Nichol), who begins all reports with 'Pur-leasee!' ("I mean, can you imagine if Robin Williams turned up naked to his next premiere?"). Cashman is presumably based on Cash Peters, who does a similar style broadcast on BBC Radio 5 Live.

Other smaller networks include:

- 15 Second News, based on BBC Three's 60 Seconds news bulletins. In order to make the news "manageable", important stories are broken into three-word headlines ("In national news a car is found in a tree in Basingstoke. Israel threatens. In sport, two world records are broken. More later").
- Traffic Round-up-date, a round-up of the latest traffic conditions (similar to BBC London's reports in the morning). Roads are routinely mis-labeled (or in some cases, made up entirely) ("On the A313131, Fiddler's Elbow, a lorry has overturned, spilling its load of cars. Traffic is slow owing to the extra volume of cars on the road", "Motorists have been warned of some weather in severe parts of the country").
- World Money Today: A spoof of BBC News 24's World Business Report, with similar graphics and simulcast between several presenters worldwide. The main presenter is Dan Evans, based in a London studio. The other reporters are based in New York, Hong Kong, Tokyo, Berlin, Geneva, Buenos Aires, Johannesburg and Sydney

Occasional separate weather reports are thrown in, with graphic and presentation styles similar to those found on many television channels in the UK. They are often cut together in such a way that the resulting sentences are complete nonsense. The weather reports vary from almost useless ("There's going to be a lot of air tomorrow") to over-useful ("The northern Tajikistan province of Gorno-Badakhshan has experienced no weather for over four months now.") and gives pointless figures similar to the pollen, pollution and sun indices used by BBC and ITV weather stations ("There is a warning of high altitude for people living on mountains in the Pennines and Yorkshire Dales").

== Episodes ==
1. Tomato Flu An outbreak of tomato flu is in the headlines. This alarming new super-virus (a parody of avian influenza) can be traced back to a turkey farm in Turkey. The news networks advise on the best way to avoid tomatoids in food such as tomato ketchup. In other news: a man is injured by a frozen block of urine.
2. Missing Island A report that an island has gone missing in the Barents Sea triggers paranoia about rising sea levels in Lincolnshire and the end of the world as we know it. In other news: teenagers' attention spans are now as low as eleven seconds.
3. Half Way There Day Reports on commemorations around the country to mark the day Britain reached the half-way point in the last World War. In other news: The MADI music awards are here again, without last year's controversy.
4. Crime The publication of a Home Office report which reveals that the majority of teenagers are now criminals leads to a series of news stories from the country's worst-hit areas. A picture of Britain in which the teenage population "now effectively feral, roam Britain's urban landscapes in packs of up to fifteen at a single time." In other news: East Anglia could be gone within a decade.
5. Bolivian Crisis Reaction comes from around the world to rumours that Bolivia might have acquired nuclear weapons. Including a report from the White House: This is a bad day for the good guys, President Bush. In other news: A cross-eyed man kills a horse while trying to shoot himself.
6. Hijack Media frenzy is quick to follow after reports emerge of an apparent hijack of an American passenger flight bound for Amsterdam. This live breaking story dominates the running orders of the world's news networks. In other news: An injunction has been served on Josh Cashman.

== Reception ==
Some have accused the show of being too close in style, presentation, writing and humour to the groundbreaking news satire The Day Today, first broadcast in 1994. Broken News has been attacked as "The Day Today for idiots. A show with nothing to say, full of...sub-Chris Morris newspeak and malapropism-humour shorn of all originality. The Day Today had a reason to exist – this didn't." However, co-creator John Morton said in The Guardian "I hope after the first 10 minutes of our show you realise that it's a different animal from The Day Today. The target has changed because we've got this Tower of Babel of news. Plus we're sillier and more harmless."
