= John Morton (writer) =

British writer and director for television and radio

John Morton is a British writer and director for television and radio, perhaps best known as the creator of People Like Us, which starred Chris Langham as the hapless documentary maker Roy Mallard. He is also the creator and writer of several other comedies for the BBC including The Sunday Format, Broken News, W1A and Twenty Twelve.

== Career ==
Morton gave up a career as an English teacher to become a writer in 1990. His first success came when BBC Radio accepted his pilot comedy script for People Like Us. It ran for three series on BBC Radio 4 from 1995 and won Sony Radio Award and a Writer's Guild Award for Best Radio Comedy before being adapted for BBC Two (with Langham in the same role) in 1999.

Morton went on to create and write the Sony Radio Award-winning satirical newspaper supplement show The Sunday Format for BBC Radio 4 and co-created the BBC One sitcom Kiss Me Kate with Chris Langham. For the launch night of BBC Four in 2001 John wrote the one-off special The Gist, a spoof arts review show presented by Robert Webb.

In 2005 Morton teamed up with writer Tony Roche on Broken News, a six-part comedy series about 24-hour rolling news which was broadcast on BBC Two.

In August 2010, the BBC announced a new six-part series Twenty Twelve, written and directed by Morton. This series is centered on the organisers of the 2012 Olympic Games in London, similar to ABC Australia's The Games. John Clarke and Ross Stevenson, creators of The Games, claimed to have had many phone conferences, meetings and over four years of email exchanges with Morton, and yet the series was made without their participation or permission. Following a 'thorough legal assessment', the BBC rejected their claims stating that; 'while the premise of the two shows was similar – focusing on the buildup to the staging of the Olympic games – the content and the style of the two shows was very different'. The series commenced on 14 March 2011 on BBC Four. A second series was broadcast on BBC2 in the run up to the 2012 London Olympic Games.

Morton wrote and directed BAFTA winning mockumentary W1A, which was broadcast from 2014 to 2017 on BBC Two, with an additional 'lockdown special' made in 2020. W1A satirised the internal workings of the BBC, and featured many of the same cast as Twenty Twelve.

In 2022, Morton helmed a remake of the French comedy series Call My Agent! (Dix pour cent), titled Ten Percent. It streamed on Amazon Prime. Morton felt there were two directions the adaptation could have gone: by portraying the agent-client relationships either cynically or affectionately. Morton decided he wanted to take the latter route, which also aligned best with the tone of the original series.

In July 2025 a mock press release announced a new series written by Morton, starring Hugh Bonneville, titled Twenty Twenty Six.

In 2026 a play by Morton, Eclipse, was performed at Chichester Festival Theatre.

== Personal life ==
Morton is married to the actress Helen Atkinson-Wood who, on first hearing People Like Us on the radio, rang the BBC in praise of the programme and was given Morton's phone number. She called him to tell him how much she liked it and Morton is said to have replied "Thanks a lot. Fancy getting married?"
