= W1A (TV series) =

British television series

- Genre: Mockumentary; Sitcom
- Created by: John Morton
- Written by: John Morton
- Directed by: John Morton
- Starring: Hugh Bonneville; Jessica Hynes; Monica Dolan; Hugh Skinner; Nina Sosanya; Sarah Parish; Jason Watkins; David Westhead; Rufus Jones; Ophelia Lovibond; Jonathan Bailey
- Narrated by: David Tennant
- Theme music composer: Laurie Johnson
- Opening theme: Las Vegas (from Animal Magic)
- Composer: Andrew Blaney
- Country of origin: United Kingdom
- Original language: English
- No. of series: 3
- No. of episodes: 15

Production
- Executive producer: Jon Plowman
- Producer: Paul Schlesinger
- Production locations: Broadcasting House, London; MediaCityUK
- Cinematography: John Sorapure
- Editor: Robin Hill
- Running time: 30 minutes 60 minutes (specials)
- Production company: BBC Studios

Original release
- Network: BBC Two
- Release: 19 March 2014 – 23 October 2017

Related
- Twenty Twelve; Twenty Twenty Six

W1A is a British television comedy series that satirises the management of the BBC. It was created by John Morton, and first broadcast on BBC Two on 19 March 2014. The series is the follow-up to Twenty Twelve, a BAFTA-winning comedy series by the BBC about the 2012 Summer Olympics in London. It sees the reintroduction of Hugh Bonneville and Jessica Hynes as their Twenty Twelve characters, alongside a new cast, with David Tennant's role as narrator also continuing from the earlier series. Jason Watkins and Nina Sosanya also returned from the cast of Twenty Twelve, albeit in new roles.

The first series began on 19 March 2014, concluding on 9 April. A second series was announced later in 2014 which launched on 23 April 2015 with a one-hour special. In August 2016, Radio Times announced that W1A had been recommissioned for a third and final series, which began airing on 18 September 2017.

The series is named after the postal code of the BBC's headquarters, Broadcasting House, which is W1A 1AA.

Bonneville and Hugh Skinner later reprised their characters in Twenty Twenty Six.

== Plot ==
The series revolves around Ian Fletcher (Hugh Bonneville), formerly the Head of the Olympic Deliverance Commission, who has been chosen to be the Head of Values at the BBC. His task is to clarify, define, or redefine the core purpose of the BBC across all its functions and to position it confidently for the future. The series deals with the everyday events at the corporation, and how the team deal with these. Such events include the arrival of Prince Charles, problems surrounding a new programme entitled Britain's Tastiest Village, as well as media scrutiny of Ian Fletcher's salary, the decision to cut the BBC Big Swing Band (which turns out to be beloved by all) and a cross-dressing ex-Premier League football player who wants to be a television pundit but is terrible at it.

== Theme music ==
The theme music is Las Vegas by Laurie Johnson, also familiar in the UK as the theme music for Animal Magic. It was composed in 1960 for the KPM music library.

== Cast ==
Character	Portrayed by	Position	Series				
Character	Portrayed by	Position	Series 1 (2014)	Series 2 (2015)	Series 3 (2016)	Webisode (2020)	Special (2024)
Main
Ian Fletcher	Hugh Bonneville	Head of Values	Main	Main	Main	Main	Main
Siobhan Sharpe	Jessica Hynes	BBC Brand Consultant, Head of Perfect Curve	Main	Main	Main		Main
Tracey Pritchard	Monica Dolan	Senior Communications Officer	Main	Main	Main	Main	Main
Simon Harwood	Jason Watkins	Director of Strategic Governance	Main	Main	Main	Main	
Anna Rampton	Sarah Parish	Head of Output (S1–2); Director of Better (S2–3)	Main	Main	Main	Main	
Lucy Freeman	Nina Sosanya	Producer (S1–2); Head of Inclusivity (S2–3)	Main	Main	Main		
Will Humphries	Hugh Skinner	Intern (S1–2); PA to Ian Fletcher (S2–3)	Main	Main	Main		Main
Neil Reid	David Westhead	Controller of News and Current Affairs	Recurring	Main	Main	Main	
David Wilkes	Rufus Jones	Entertainment Format Producer (S1–2); Senior Executive – Primetime Factuality (S2); Commissioning Editor – Primetime Factuality (S3)	Recurring	Main	Main		
Izzy Gould	Ophelia Lovibond	PA to Simon Harwood (S1–2); Development Producer (S2–3)	Recurring	Main	Main		
Jack Patterson	Jonathan Bailey	PA to Anna Rampton & Exec in Betterness Development	Recurring	Main	Main		
Recurring
Jerry Guildencrantz	Ivan Gonzalez	Digital Strategist	Recurring	Recurring	Recurring		
Ben Rosenstern	Max Olesker	Digital Strategist	Recurring	Recurring	Recurring		
Matt Taverner	Daniel Ings	Head of Generic Comedy and Drama (S1–2); Head of Output (S2–3)	Recurring	Recurring	Recurring		
Dan Sheppard	Tom Basden	Writer of Home Truths	Recurring	Recurring			
Barney Lumsden	Alex Beckett	Ideation Architect at Perfect Curve	Recurring	Recurring	Recurring		
Coco Lomax	Sara Pascoe	Trend Analyst at Perfect Curve	Guest	Guest	Recurring		
Karl Marx	Joel Fry	Viral Concept Designer at Perfect Curve	Guest	Guest	Recurring		

Bonneville reprises his role of Ian Fletcher from W1A's predecessor, Twenty Twelve, as does Hynes, who plays Siobhan Sharpe, the Head of Perfect Curve, a brand consultant agency. Also returning are Sharpe's team, consisting of Barney Lumsden, Coco Lomax and Karl Marx (Beckett, Pascoe and Fry, respectively), whilst the remainder of the cast were created by Morton as new characters.

Main cast of W1A (series two)

Cameo/guest appearances

- Alan Yentob (2014, 2015; 2 episodes)
- Carol Vorderman (2014; 2 episodes)
- Salman Rushdie (2014; 1 episode)
- Olivia Colman (2014; 1 episode)
- Matt Addis (2014; 1 episode)
- Jenni Murray (2014; 1 episode)
- Clare Balding (2014; 1 episode)
- Evan Davis (2015; 2 episodes)
- Samuel West (2015; 1 episode)
- Alex Jones (2015; 1 episode)
- Matt Baker (2015; 1 episode)
- Sarah Hadland (2015; 1 episode)
- Sophie Raworth (2015; 1 episode)
- Mary Beard (2015; 1 episode)
- Jeremy Paxman (2017; 1 episode)
- Gary Lineker (2017; 1 episode)
- Alan Shearer (2017; 1 episode)
- Lenny Henry (2017, 2024; 2 episodes)
- Hugh Grant (2017; 1 episode)
- Rose Matafeo (2017; 1 episode)
- Claudia Winkleman (2017; 1 episode)
- Tony Hall (2017; 1 episode)
- Tom Davis (2024; 1 episode)
- Mo Farah (2024; 1 episode)
- Chesney Hawkes (2024; 1 episode)
- Wynne Evans (2024; 1 episode)
- Lorraine Kelly (2024; 1 episode)
- Rustie Lee (2024; 1 episode)
- Richard Madeley (2024; 1 episode)
- Romesh Ranganathan (2024; 1 episode)
- Lenny Rush (2024; 1 episode)

== Production ==
W1A was commissioned by Janice Hadlow, controller of BBC Two, and Shane Allen, controller of comedy commissioning. Filming began in January 2014. W1A was written and directed by John Morton, who previously worked on Twenty Twelve and People Like Us. The producer is Paul Schlesinger and the executive producer is Jon Plowman. A second series was commissioned in September 2014, with Bonneville's return also confirmed.

== Episodes ==
=== Series overview ===
Series	Episodes	Originally released	
Series	Episodes	First released	Last released
1	4	19 March 2014	9 April 2014
2	4	23 April 2015	14 May 2015
3	6	18 September 2017	23 October 2017
Webisode		21 May 2020	

=== Series 1 (2014) ===
No.	Title	Directed by	Written by	Original release date	UK viewers (millions)
1	"Episode 1"	John Morton	John Morton	19 March 2014	2.47
Fletcher takes up his new job as Head of Values at the BBC just as accusations of anti-Cornish bias are levelled at the Corporation, compounded when a Spotlight Southwest presenter, Sally Wingate, goes public in support of the accusations. Producer Lucy Freeman chairs a meeting about forthcoming flagship show Britain's Tastiest Village and the loss of presenter Clare Balding and her replacement by Carol Vorderman. Featuring as themselves: Carol Vorderman, Clare Balding, Alan Yentob, Salman Rushdie
2	"Episode 2"	John Morton	John Morton	26 March 2014	1.94
Fletcher reluctantly takes the train North to BBC Media City, Salford, for his first big interview in the job by Jenni Murray on Radio 4's Woman's Hour where he hopes to defuse the media storm that has become known as Wingategate. Complications arise for the Britain's Tastiest Village production team, after having wooed and won Carol Vorderman as Clare Balding's replacement to co-present with Alan Titchmarsh. However, at the last minute Clare Balding is available and turns up at New Broadcasting House as Carol Vorderman is leaving and they have to be kept apart. In Salford Fletcher ignores advisors Sharpe and Pritchard with his own solution to both problems resulting in Alan Titchmarsh pulling out. Featuring as themselves: Carol Vorderman, Jenni Murray, Clare Balding
3	"Episode 3"	John Morton	John Morton	2 April 2014	1.61
Anna Rampton advocates moving Songs of Praise to radio, thus freeing up a prime slot for her own series, Britain's Tastiest Village. The debate about the future of the BBC is not helped when Ian Fletcher's salary comes under intense scrutiny in the press. Neil Reid, current Controller of Current Affairs, is having to deal with the fallout from a blunder in BBC News coverage of the Syrian crisis when a photo of Trudie Styler was used instead of Asma al-Assad. Producer Lucy Freeman goes in to pitch Home Truth, a script she's been developing over several years with writer Dan Shepherd. Siobhan Sharpe and her team at Perfect Curve are asked to refresh the BBC logo and come to the conclusion that the problem with the current logo is that it has too many letters.
4	"Episode 4"	John Morton	John Morton	9 April 2014	1.64
A national paper publishes details of Ian Fletcher's salary and follows up with a story of how he took Sally Owen, his PA at the Olympic Deliverance Commission, on holiday to Italy. Following a damage limitation meeting, Ian Fletcher is persuaded to cut his own salary. Meanwhile, a female Newsnight presenter has been accused of wearing clothes that are inappropriately watchable. When the programme becomes known as Kneesnight and her legs get their own Twitter account there is a feeling something should be done about it. Flagship series Britain's Tastiest Village has lost all three of the big-name presenters who were attached to do the show – so the search continues. Brand consultant Siobhan Sharpe and her team unveil their new idea for a new BBC logo, claiming the issue with the existing logo is that there are too many letters.

=== Series 2 (2015) ===
No. overall	No. in series	Title	Directed by	Written by	Original release date	UK viewers (millions)
5	1	"Episode 1"	John Morton	John Morton	23 April 2015	1.95
The team prepare for a visit from Prince Charles while dealing with issues surrounding Jeremy Clarkson. Meanwhile, Siobhan comes up with ideas for a "brand mashup" between the BBC and Wimbledon, and Will's security pass has expired. David tries to come up with ideas to impress Lucy, while Lucy and a TV writer present a new show to the head of BBC Comedy.
6	2	"Episode 2"	John Morton	John Morton	30 April 2015	1.69
Anna Rampton, Head of Output, goes for the new role of Director of Better. There are rumours that Newsnight anchor Evan Davis is to be a contestant in the forthcoming series of Strictly Come Dancing – news that doesn't go down well with Head of News and Current Affairs Neil Reid. It is made worse when it transpires that BBC brand consultant Siobhan Sharpe is behind this latest move for Evan. Meanwhile, ex-intern Will Humphries makes life more difficult for Izzy when he accidentally syncs her computer with his.
7	3	"Episode 3"	John Morton	John Morton	7 May 2015	1.32
Anna Rampton has been crowned Director of Better but no-one on the management team is quite clear what the job entails. Tracey Pritchard suggests an event in the BBC Radio Theatre, but Siobhan Sharpe has altogether different ideas – none of which involve the words radio or theatre. She encourages the team to think big and global. Elsewhere, David Wilkes continues his seemingly unstoppable rise through the organisation with some surprising job news, and the BBC software programme Syncopatishare (designed to make life easier) is proving difficult to master, especially for ex-intern Will. Simon Harwood comes up with a brand new management structure for the BBC, which is essentially the old one rotated 90 degrees – one which threatens to put the Director of Better bang in the centre of things and Ian Fletcher right at the margins. However Ian offers up an alternative and altogether more creative vision.
8	4	"Episode 4"	John Morton	John Morton	14 May 2015	1.28
In his new role as Senior Executive, Primetime Factuality, David Wilkes needs to flesh out the programme idea behind One Big Family, so he turns for inspiration to Izzy Gould in her new role as Development Producer. On the verge of leaving the BBC, Lucy has been persuaded to take on a new job as Head of Inclusivity. One of her first jobs is to head up discussion on the Way Ahead Task Force around inclusivity targets, with an imminent meeting of the Cross Parliamentary Inclusion Action Watch Dog Group at Westminster. Siobhan Sharpe's idea is to "viralise" Muslim BBC Weather presenter Sadiq Iqbal, who is less than thrilled with the idea of becoming a national icon. It's down to Head of Values Ian Fletcher to try and steer the BBC ship through increasingly choppy waters, while at the same time decide who he'd like to spend his free evening with, Lucy or Anna.

=== Series 3 (2017) ===
No. overall	No. in series	Title	Directed by	Written by	Original release date	UK viewers (millions)
9	1	"Episode 1"	John Morton	John Morton	18 September 2017	1.83
It is the year of charter renewal and a critical time for the BBC. The renewal group under head of values Ian Fletcher is tasked with identifying what the BBC does best and finding more ways of doing less of it better. A new challenge comes in the shape of a Channel 4 documentary about a cross-dressing ex-Premier League footballer Ryan Chelford, which alleges that the BBC rejected Ryan as a potential pundit on Match of the Day because of his unconventional private life. The fact is he was auditioned and it turned out he was not very good. Over in the Perfect Curve PR office, things have changed. They have been bought by media giant Fun Media, who are keen to come up with new ideas for their BBC account. Siobhan Sharpe is equally keen to take credit for the result of their latest brainstorming - the idea for a new online platform called BBC Me - a new home for user-generated content. After all, according to Siobhan, conventional television is dead. Meanwhile, newly promoted junior development producer Will Humphries' idea for a new interview format On Your Bike is in danger of being appropriated by commissioning editor daytime factuality David Wilkes and pitched to the head of TV output as The Great British Bike Off.
10	2	"Episode 2"	John Morton	John Morton	25 September 2017	1.56
Cross-dressing ex-Premier League footballer Ryan Chelford's appearance on a late-night, midweek edition of Match of the Day did not go well. Host Gary Lineker and pundit Alan Shearer were literally lost for words. But the BBC in general and, in his role as head of values Ian Fletcher in particular, are under pressure to find an on-screen role for Ryan as quickly as possible. A summit meeting is arranged to include heads of football, inclusivity and a late curve ball in the shape of head of diversity to try and find a solution to a problem that is getting increasing attention on social media. To complicate matters, Fiona Craig, the senior civil servant with responsibility for charter renewal negotiations, is visiting the BBC to see what a normal day in the life of the corporation looks like. Meanwhile, the campaign to launch user-generated content platform BBC Me gathers pace with David Wilkes still keen to take ownership of the idea he originally borrowed from ex-intern Will Humphries.
11	3	"Episode 3"	John Morton	John Morton	2 October 2017	1.82
The search for new ways of saving money at the BBC continues - particularly important in the light of charter renewal. Having dismissed the idea of losing programmes about gardening as a possible solution the renewal team propose that the cutting of the BBC Big Swing Band might send out a useful message - after all, does the BBC need six orchestras? When news gets out that this is on the agenda the BBC start to get what head of communications Tracey Pritchard calls 'heavy incoming'. A situation exacerbated by the fact that Ray Fredericks, the much-loved Big Swing Band leader, is about to celebrate his 75th birthday with a special anniversary concert. What had started in a strategy meeting as an idea with potential has turned into a major PR disaster. Meanwhile, PR guru Siobhan Sharpe is leading the creative journey towards launching BBC Me, a new online platform. It is thought to be a good idea to create a launch trail which would include as many people as possible doing selfies of themselves saying the word 'Me' in the hope that the trail will go viral. Ex-intern Will Humphries is delegated to stand in the main reception of New Broadcasting House to try and persuade various celebrities to contribute their 'Me' for the trail. Finally, head of news Neil Reid has to wrangle a significant problem of his own when the latest version of the BBC's automatic live subtitling software is shown to have some major defects - such as getting the spelling of proper names embarrassingly wrong.
12	4	"Episode 4"	John Morton	John Morton	9 October 2017	1.5
Following on from an item on BBC Breakfast about plans to close the BBC Big Swing Band, the damage limitation team under Ian Fletcher is under huge pressure to limit the damage. A twitter campaign led by Jools Holland, #JeSuisBigSwingb and #boycottBBC, is gathering support from music royalty such as Sir Bob Geldof, Sir Tom Jones and Bono. And as the much-loved Big Swing bandleader Ray Fredericks is both black and 75, there are a growing number of accusations of discrimination and ageism. BBC News outlets are keen to report the latest developments but exacerbate the problem when Syncopatico, the new News subtitling software, continues to systematically misspell the names of the key players involved - including Jools Holland. It is felt that an appearance from one of the BBC senior management team on the News at One would be a helpful way of clarifying the BBC's position - but when head of better Anna Rampton unexpectedly rules herself out, it falls to Ian Fletcher to face the music. Meanwhile, the campaign to launch new online platform BBC Me continues and ex-intern Will Humphries is still standing at his station in reception trying to persuade passing celebrities to record themselves saying 'me' into his phone.
13	5	"Episode 5"	John Morton	John Morton	16 October 2017	1.39
The renewal group led by head of values Ian Fletcher has to respond to rumours that Strictly Come Dancing presenter Claudia Winkleman is about to leave the BBC for a rival broadcaster. Is there a way of preventing this happening? When they offer a hosting job on On Your Bike, a new interview format, it looks like they might have found a solution. Meanwhile ex-intern Will's attempts to get a celebrity face to help launch BBC Me, the new online platform, have come back to bite him and the BBC. The celebrity in question thought they were being asked to pose for a selfie and didn't realise they were being used to endorse a viral campaign and consequently the BBC finds itself on the receiving end of a million-pound lawsuit. Will's job looks to be in serious danger. With the charter renewal process requiring the BBC to show they can do more for less, head of news Neil Reid is asked to see whether his main news presenters would consider doubling up and presenting the weather forecast as well. And in a landscape where leaving parties are becoming increasingly frequent, Ben and Jerry discover that their jobs have been 're-imagined as non-existing going forward'.
14	6	"Episode 6"	John Morton	John Morton	23 October 2017	1.47
Key broadcasting talent Claudia Winkleman is close to signing a deal which would keep her at the BBC. She is set to present On Your Bike but the deal is jeopardised with the revelation that an almost identical format has been developed and offered to Amanda Holden. How can the damage limitation group limit the damage? In the wake of a potentially very expensive lawsuit against the BBC, Izzy volunteers to take the flak and is summoned to the director general's office. Meanwhile, the official launch of BBC Me, the new online platform for user-generated content, is nearing the final furlong, but with the disappearance of several senior executive posts, including head of values and director of better, it is not clear who will be leading the charge to the finish line.

After the transmission of Episode 1 on BBC Two Episode 2 was made available on BBC iPlayer on 18 September 2017. Likewise after the transmission of Episode 3 on 2 October 2017 Episode 4 was made available online. This was repeated for episodes 5 and 6.

=== Webisodes (2020) ===
In 2020, during the COVID-19 pandemic and lockdown, a number of specially created webisodes featuring the characters from W1A were produced. The first was released on 19 May, when Hugh Bonneville, in character as Ian Fletcher, introduced the BBC Concert Orchestra performing a new arrangement of Las Vegas, the series' theme tune. On 21 May, a second video was released, this time featuring Bonneville, Sarah Parrish, Jason Watkins, Monica Dolan and David Westhead at the first virtual meeting of the BBC's 'COVID-19 Bounce Back Group'.

No.	Title	Directed by	Written by	Original release date
15	"Initial Lockdown Meeting"	John Morton	John Morton	21 May 2020
Ian Fletcher chairs the first virtual meeting of the BBC's COVID-19 Bounce Back Group to discuss the plans for what happens when the BBC runs out of repeats to repeat.

== Awards and nominations ==
Year	Award	Nominee	Category	Result	Ref.
2015	BAFTA TV Awards	Jessica Hynes	Best Female Performance in a Comedy Programme	Won	
2015	BAFTA TV Awards	Hugh Bonneville	Best Male Performance in a Comedy Programme	Nominated	
2015	RTS Craft & Design Awards	Robin Hill	Best Tape and Film Editing: Entertainment and Situation Comedy	Won	
2015	Writers' Guild of Great Britain Awards	John Morton	Best TV Situation Comedy	Nominated	
2016	BAFTA TV Awards	Hugh Bonneville	Best Male Performance in a Comedy Programme	Nominated	
