= The Sunday Format =

UK radio program

- Running time: 30 minutes
- Country of origin: United Kingdom
- Language: English
- Home station: BBC Radio 4
- Starring: Ewan Bailey, Rebecca Front, Simon Greenall, Emma Kennedy, Chris Langham
- Created by: John Morton
- Written by: Simon Blackwell, Nick Revell, Dave Cohen, Ewan Bailey, Emma Kennedy, Bill Dare, Laurence Howarth, Andrew Marlatt and Tony Roche
- Produced by: Paul Schlesinger, Helen Williams.
- Website: bbc.co.uk/radio4/comedy/sundayformat.shtml

The Sunday Format is a British satirical radio comedy programme, parodying British Sunday newspapers, and in particular their lifestyle and celebrity supplements. The programme consists of a series of short sketches that dramatise the articles in the eponymous newspaper, with the cast assuming the characters of the journalists or columnists. Sketches are broken up, and often use backing music which also stops and starts along with the reading of the column as the notional reader's eye wanders across the page when an article loses their interest. Articles typically hover just above fractional interest also include exotically unrelatable, earnestly spun-out mundanities and wordplay to effectively mock the prolix poorly edited writing style of such publications.

== Conception ==
The show was first heard in 1996 in a one-off pilot episode. It did not return until a four-part series aired in Feb/Mar 1999, followed by six episodes in Nov/Dec 2000, and three additional four-part series in Sep/Oct 2001, Jan 2003 and Jan/Feb 2004. The show has won a Sony Radio Award and a British Comedy Award.

The show was devised by John Morton and was produced by Paul Schlesinger and Helen Williams. The writing team is Simon Blackwell, Nick Revell, Dave Cohen, Ewan Bailey, Emma Kennedy, Bill Dare, Laurence Howarth, Andrew Marlatt and Tony Roche. The cast is Ewan Bailey, Rebecca Front, Simon Greenall, Emma Kennedy, Chris Langham, Tracy-Ann Oberman, and Alice Arnold. Alexander Armstrong, Ben Miller, Martin Hyder and Siriol Jenkins also appeared in the earlier series.

== See also ==
- People Like Us
- The Harpoon
