= Twenty Twelve =

British TV sitcom series

- Genre: Mockumentary
- Created by: John Morton
- Written by: John Morton
- Directed by: John Morton
- Starring: Hugh Bonneville; Jessica Hynes; Amelia Bullmore; Olivia Colman; Vincent Franklin; Karl Theobald; Morven Christie
- Narrated by: David Tennant
- Theme music composer: Irving Berlin
- Opening theme: "Let's Face the Music and Dance" sung by Nat King Cole
- Country of origin: United Kingdom
- Original language: English
- No. of series: 2
- No. of episodes: 13

Production
- Executive producer: Jon Plowman
- Producer: Paul Schlesinger
- Running time: 30 minutes
- Production company: BBC

Original release
- Network: BBC Four (2011–2012); BBC Two (2012); BBC HD
- Release: 14 March 2011 – 24 July 2012

Related
- W1A; Twenty Twenty Six

Twenty Twelve is a British television comedy series written and directed by John Morton. Starring Hugh Bonneville, Jessica Hynes and Amelia Bullmore, the programme is a spoof on-location mockumentary following the organisation of the 2012 Summer Olympics in London. It was first broadcast on UK television station BBC Four in March 2011 to coincide with the 500-day countdown to the opening ceremony.

Twenty Twelve gained mainly positive reviews from critics, and a four-part second series was announced on 15 April 2011, which began airing on 30 March 2012 on BBC Two. A further three episodes of series 2 began airing from 10 July 2012. The series' last episode was broadcast on 24 July 2012, three days before the opening ceremony of the London Olympic Games.

Several core characters went on to appear in a sequel, W1A, in 2014. Bonneville reprised his character in Twenty Twenty Six, about events leading up to a football world cup.

== Plot ==
The series follows the trials of the management of the fictional Olympic Deliverance Commission (ODC), the body tasked to organise the 2012 London Summer Olympics. Over the series, the ODC have to overcome logistical difficulties, production errors, infrastructure problems and troublesome contributors. The main character is Ian Fletcher, the Head of Deliverance, who is in overall charge of the ODC, and is generally efficient but often has to clean up a PR disaster after the other managers make a mistake. A running thread in series one are the hints that his marriage to a high-flying lawyer is breaking down, which comes to a head in episode six. It is evident that his PA Sally is in love with him, although this remains unspoken.

Meanwhile, Siobhan Sharpe is the excitable, but ultimately clueless Head of Brand through her PR company Perfect Curve. She answers almost every problem with phrases that have almost no substance whatsoever, and never turns her phone off during meetings with the other managers. Consequently, the rest of the managers find her ideas and enthusiastic attitude tiresome, particularly Nick Jowett, Head of Contracts, a blunt Yorkshireman who generally opposes ideas without making alternative suggestions, whilst emphasising that he is from Yorkshire. Jowett briefly becomes Acting Head of Deliverance in Series 2 when Ian Fletcher becomes incapacitated.

Kay Hope, Head of Sustainability, is in charge of sorting out what will happen to the buildings, stadia and other Olympic venues after the games. Hope is emphatic that Legacy is something separate from Sustainability although no one makes any attempt to differentiate these two apparently identical areas. She continually mentions that she is a single mother after a bitter divorce, and is paranoid about her public image. In series two Fi Healey joins the team as a new 'Head of Legacy', and instantly becomes Kay's nemesis due to being younger, ambitious and career savvy; the pair constantly clash. Finally, Head of Infrastructure Graham Hitchens gives the impression that he knows everything about the London transport and traffic systems, but is completely ignorant, has no clue about deadlines and frequently upsets various officials.

== Cast ==
Character	Actor	Position	Series	
Character	Actor	Position	One	Two
Ian Fletcher	Hugh Bonneville	Head of Deliverance of the Olympic Deliverance Commission	Main	Main
Kay Hope	Amelia Bullmore	Head of Sustainability	Main	Main
Sally Owen	Olivia Colman	Ian Fletcher's personal assistant	Main	Main
Nick Jowett	Vincent Franklin	Head of Contracts	Main	Main
Siobhan Sharpe	Jessica Hynes	Head of Brand	Main	Main
Graham Hitchins	Karl Theobald	Head of Infrastructure	Main	Main
Fi Healey	Morven Christie	Head of Legacy		Main
Daniel Stroud	Samuel Barnett	Ian Fletcher's personal assistant		Main
Barney Lumsden	Alex Beckett	Brand consultant	Guest	Recurrent
Karl Marx	Joel Fry	Brand consultant		Recurrent
Coco Lomax	Sara Pascoe	Brand consultant		Recurrent

== Episodes ==
=== Series 1 (2011) ===
No. overall	No. in series	Title	Original release date	Viewers
1	1	"Countdown"	14 March 2011	417,000
PR consultant Siobhan Sharpe is preparing to unveil a countdown clock in front of Tate Modern. However, her boss Ian Fletcher is not impressed. Kay Hope struggles to find a post-games use for the Taekwondo Arena. Meanwhile, Graham Hitchins is planning a new traffic management system, which he decides to test on the day of the clock unveiling.
2	2	"Visitors from Rio"	21 March 2011	474,000
The ODC take a group of delegates to meet Lord Coe at the London Olympic Park. However, the traffic and a bus driver who doesn't know London conspire against them. Olympic organiser Lord "Seb" Coe makes a cameo appearance as himself in this episode.
3	3	"Roman Remains"	28 March 2011	420,000
After the discovery of Roman remains near the aquatics centre, the building plans need to be modified at the last minute. Meanwhile, Siobhan Sharpe wants the 2012 Games to have their own audio logo.
4	4	"Raising the Bar"	4 April 2011	419,000
Former Olympic athlete Dave Wellbeck tours schools as brand ambassador for Raising the Bar, a campaign to get young people interested in the Olympic Games. But his lack of charisma has the opposite effect and Ian Fletcher and Siobhan Sharpe are unsure on how to proceed.
5	5	"Cultural Curator"	11 April 2011	389,000
For the post of Curator of the Cultural Olympiad three applicants are being interviewed. Meanwhile, Sebastian Coe suggests that the Olympic Deliverance Commission team consider entering the London Marathon.
6	6	"Equestrian Controversy"	18 April 2011	432,000
The ODC's plans for the equestrian centre annoy famous film director Tony Ward (Tim McInnerny), who dumps a pile of horse manure in front of their offices. Ian Fletcher decides to challenge him face-to-face on a Radio 4 Today interview.

=== Series 2 (2012) ===
No. overall	No. in series	Title	Original release date	Viewers
7	1	"Boycott" – Part 1	30 March 2012	1,200,000
The Algerian Olympic team threatens to boycott the Games after discovering that the Shared Belief Centre does not face Mecca.
8	2	"Boycott" – Part 2	6 April 2012	972,000 (overnight)
It is the second half of a very long day. The Algerians issue a deadline of midnight for a solution to their demand for a Shared Belief Centre which faces Mecca, while the French threaten to pull out of the Games if a separate mosque is built. The team have to come up with an idea that will please everyone.
9	3	"Clarence House"	13 April 2012	N/A
A decision must be made about the future of the Olympic Stadium, and Clarence House has asked the ODC to look at ways of linking the 2012 Olympics with the Queen's Diamond Jubilee – is 'Jubilympics' the perfect branding solution?
10	4	"The Rapper"	20 April 2012	N/A
Siobhan's team design a major sexual health campaign, complete with a rap song "Get It On", which may upset the Catholic competitors.
11	5	"Catastrophisation"	10 July 2012	1,450,000
Thirty two days to go, and with Head of Deliverance Ian Fletcher chairing the final ever meeting of the Twenty Twelve Security Committee's Special Catastrophisation Unit, it emerges that someone has been caught converting official Olympic starting pistols to fire live rounds; with the US Security Forward Team about to arrive.
12	6	"Inclusivity Day"	17 July 2012	1,800,000
Having been shot in the foot with a doctored starting pistol, Ian Fletcher discovers that he is also shortly to be without a PA as current PA Daniel Stroud has been offered another job. Back over at the offices of the ODC, they try to work out how to launch Inclusivity Day in London on the same day that Seb Coe is launching Diversity Day in Oldham, when even though both Boris Johnson and Baroness Tanni Grey-Thompson have agreed to take part, no-one knows what Inclusivity Day is. Meanwhile, over at PR company Perfect Curve, Siobhan Sharpe and her team devise a viral campaign designed to change the face of women's football without mentioning women's football following catastrophic ticket sales.
13	7	"Loose Ends"	24 July 2012	1,780,000
Ten days left to try to tie up loose ends before the Deliverance Team finally hands over to the Live Team, the main problem being that the opening ceremony fireworks display will launch the ground-to-air missiles installed to protect the Games, and newly divorced and soon-to-be redundant Ian must decide what to do about Sally. The programme ends just before he expresses his feelings...

== Reviews ==
=== Critical reviews ===
Reviews for episode 1 were mixed, commenting that it was milder in its satire than they expected; Ed Cumming in The Telegraph stated "Perhaps it just needs some time to settle. Though it was very funny in parts, the first episode of Twenty Twelve suggests that the series, like the actual cost of the Olympics, might hit slightly wide of its ample target." Likewise, Sam Wollaston in The Guardian suggested that due to the participation of Seb Coe it was "on song": "Biting satire this isn't. It's nibbling satire, delivered by Garra Rufa fish...The Thick of It is a lot more entertaining...I don't think that politicians were removing their shoes, rolling up their trousers and queuing up for cameos in The Thick of It". Brian Viner, writing in The Independent was more impressed by Coe's cameo: "There is surely no other country in the world that would laugh at itself in this way, even persuading the vast project's principal mover-and-shaker, in our case the Rt Hon Lord Coe KBE, to participate in the joke". He went on to commend the series "...I was hooked anyway, by the mischief in John Morton's script and the beautifully nuanced performances of, in particular, Hugh Bonneville and Jessica Hynes".

Reviewing the series as a whole, Viner stated that the series was "always amusing and sporadically very funny... It's hard to think of a spoof documentary that has been more fortuitously timed than Twenty Twelve."

=== Real-life similarities ===
It was widely commented upon in the press that the day after the broadcast of the first episode, which features problems with the 1,000-day countdown clock, the real-life clock in Trafalgar Square broke soon after it had been launched by Lord Coe and London mayor Boris Johnson.

An additional coincidence occurred when some of the first athletes to arrive in London for the Olympics suffered delays; their bus drivers were unfamiliar with London and unable to find the Olympic Park, in scenes that closely resembled the plot of episode 2.

=== The Games plagiarism accusation ===
Twenty Twelve has been criticised as bearing a strong resemblance to the Australian mockumentary series The Games, a similar series set before the 2000 Sydney Olympics. Writer of The Games John Clarke said, "We worked very hard on that project and we had long conversations with these people who've now done a show like that in Britain".

The BBC denied claims of plagiarism. "It is a very different show, the only similarities between them are that they are both set around the Olympics," a corporation source said. Clarke's own website later made a reference to the dispute by describing himself and writing partner as "run[ning] a charitable institute supplying formats to British television".

== Awards and nominations ==
The programme was the winner of the Best Sitcom category at the British Comedy Awards 2011, while Jessica Hynes received the Best Comedy Performance award for her role from the Royal Television Society. For his role in Twenty Twelve Osy Ikhile was nominated for "Best TV Comedy Performance" at the Black International Film Festival and Music Video & Screen Awards.

In May 2013, the programme was awarded title of 'Best Sitcom' at the annual BAFTA awards, with star Olivia Colman also picking up the award for 'Best Female Comedy Performance', a category in which co-star Jessica Hynes was also nominated. Hugh Bonneville also received a nomination for his role of Head of Deliverance, Ian Fletcher.

Year	Award	Nominee	Category	Result	Reference
2011	British Comedy Awards	John Morton	Best TV Sitcom	Won	
2011	British Comedy Awards	Hugh Bonneville	Best TV Comedy Actor	Nominated	
2011	British Comedy Awards	John Morton	Best New Comedy Programme	Nominated	
2012	BAFTA TV Award	Olivia Colman	Best Female Performance in a Comedy Programme	Nominated	
2012	BAFTA TV Award	Hugh Bonneville	Best Male Performance in a Comedy Programme	Nominated	
2012	British Comedy Awards	Twenty Twelve	Best Sitcom	Nominated	
2012	British Comedy Awards	Hugh Bonneville	Best TV Comedy Actor	Nominated	
2012	British Comedy Awards	Jessica Hynes	Best TV Comedy Actress	Nominated	
2012	British Comedy Awards	Olivia Colman	Best TV Comedy Actress	Nominated	
2012	Broadcasting Press Guild Awards	John Morton, Paul Schlesinger	Best Comedy/Entertainment	Nominated	
2013	BAFTA TV Award	Olivia Colman	Best Female Performance in a Comedy Programme	Won	
2013	BAFTA TV Award	John Morton, Paul Schlesinger, Catherine Gosling Fuller, Jon Plowman	Best Situation Comedy	Won	
2013	BAFTA TV Award	John Morton	Best Writer: Comedy	Nominated	
2013	BAFTA TV Award	Jessica Hynes	Best Female Performance in a Comedy Programme	Nominated	
2013	BAFTA TV Award	Hugh Bonneville	Best Male Performance in a Comedy Programme	Nominated	
2013	Broadcasting Press Guild Awards	John Morton	Best Comedy/Entertainment	Won	
2013	Broadcasting Press Guild Awards	John Morton	Writer's Award	Nominated	
2013	RTS Television Awards	Best Scripted Comedy	Twenty Twelve	Nominated	
2013	RTS Television Awards	Jessica Hynes	Best Comedy Performance	Won	
2013	RTS Television Awards	John Morton	Best Writer - Comedy	Nominated	

== DVD release ==
On 23 October 2012 BBC Home Entertainment released the entire series in a two-disc DVD set.

== Sequels ==
After the final episode had aired, there was speculation in the media about a third series with the team liaising with the organisation team of the Rio de Janeiro games in 2016, or becoming management consultants. When asked about whether the hit show could return, main star Bonneville said, "Absolutely. They could go and help with the organisation of the Rio Games in 2016...but ultimately, this is a crack team that could go anywhere and manage anything – the City, say, or the armed services. The NHS also needs rebranding. They could get Ian in to announce, 'If health is about anything, it's about managing expectations. We have got to get people to appreciate there are a lot of positive things about ill health. We need to make it sexy'."

A sequel was announced by the BBC in late 2013 and broadcast 19 March to 9 April 2014. Named W1A, it follows Ian Fletcher (Bonneville) and Siobhan Sharpe (Jessica Hynes) as they pursue new careers as part of the BBC management team. A second series was commissioned in September 2014 and broadcast 23 April to 14 May 2015. A third series began airing on 18 September 2017.

A further sequel was announced in 2025. Titled Twenty Twenty Six, it will see Hugh Bonneville reprise his role as Ian Fletcher, as he joins the Oversight Team in Miami as part of preparations for the 2026 FIFA World Cup. Further cast members announced include Nick Blood, Chelsey Crisp, Paulo Costanzo, Stephen Kunken, Jimena Larraguivel, Alexis Michalik, and Belinda Stewart-Wilson. As with the original series, Twenty Twenty Six will be written and directed by John Morton. In September 2025, it was further announced that Hugh Skinner would reprise his W1A role of Will Humphries, while David Tennant would return as narrator. Additional cast members Marli Sui, Nicole Sadie Sawyerr, Joe Hewetson, and Erin Kellyman were also announced.

== See also ==
- Olympic Delivery Authority
- London Organising Committee of the Olympic Games and Paralympic Games
