= Alex Beckett (actor) =

British actor

- Born: Peter Alexander Beckett; 30 June 1982; Carmarthenshire, Wales, UK
- Died: 10 April 2018 (aged 35); South Norwood, London, England, UK
- Occupation: Actor
- Years active: 2004–2018

Peter Alexander Beckett (30 June 1982 – 10 April 2018) was a British actor. He was best known for his role in the BBC TV comedy series Twenty Twelve and its follow-up W1A. He played many theatre roles, including Higgins in Pygmalion in 2017, and several characters, including Fidel Castro, in the 2013 musical hybrid production of the Neon Neon album Praxis Makes Perfect. He also played Michael in the BBC Radio 4 drama Tracks.

== Death ==
Beckett died at his home in South Norwood, London, on 10 April 2018, aged 35, in what was ruled by the coroner to be suicide by hanging; it was noted that, at the time of his death, Beckett had been suffering from depression for almost a year. Director Josie Rourke dedicated Mary Queen of Scots to Beckett's memory. He played the role of Walter Mildmay, English Chancellor of the Exchequer.

There is an annual darts tournament named in Beckett's honour at The Barley Mow, Marylebone, where he once worked as a manager.

== Filmography ==
=== Film ===
Year	Film	Role	Notes
2015	Youth	Bearded Screenwriter	
2018	Mary Queen of Scots	Walter Mildmay	Posthumous release (dedicated in memory)

=== Television ===
Year	Title	Role	Notes
2009	A Child's Christmases in Wales	Carol Singer	TV movie
2011–12	Twenty Twelve	Barney Lumsden	6 episodes
2014–17	W1A	Barney Lumsden	7 episodes
2015	The Scandalous Lady W	Capt. Leversuch	TV movie
2015–18	I Live with Models	Seth	8 episodes
2017	The End of the F***ing World	Jonno	episode 1.7
2018	Stath Lets Flats	Marcus	5 episodes; released posthumously

=== Radio ===
Year	Title	Role
2016	Tracks	Michael
