= Tracks (podcast) =

Thriller podcast by the BBC

- Country of origin: United Kingdom
- Language: English
- Home station: BBC Radio 4
- Starring: Romola Garai; Alex Beckett; Jonathan Forbes; Sean Baker; Fiona O'Shaughnessy; Kai Owen; Robert Pugh; Betsan Llwyd; Hattie Morahan; Olivia Poulet; Juno Robinson
- Created by: Matthew Broughton
- Written by: Matthew Broughton
- Directed by: James Robinson
- Produced by: James Robinson (series 1-5); Abigail le Fleming (series 1); Helen Perry (series 1); John Norton (series 5)
- Original release: 9 August 2016 – 21 December 2020
- No. of series: 5
- No. of episodes: 43
- Opening theme: "Tracks Theme" by Stu Barker
- Website: Official BBC page

Tracks is a British thriller-mystery fiction podcast created and written by Matthew Broughton, and primarily directed and produced by James Robinson. The show premiered on 9 August 2016, and concluded with its fifth series, Abyss, on 21 December 2020. Each series has its own subtitle, with the first series, originally simply called Tracks, retroactively subtitled Origins. Produced by BBC Cymru Wales, it aired on BBC Radio 4, with some episodes first being made available on the BBC's website, on which the series remains available to listen to.

Matthew Broughton wrote almost all episodes of the series, with Caroline Horton, Katherine Chandler, Lucy Catherine, Matt Hartley, and Timothy X Atack writing some episodes of series 3 and 5. James Robinson produced all episodes and directed most, with Abigail le Fleming, Carl Prekopp, Helen Perry, John Norton and Rebecca Lloyd-Evans acting as producers and/or directors alongside him for one series each.

The series follows the investigations of Dr. Helen Ash, a primary care physician whose life is changed when she witnesses the crash of a plane on which her estranged father was a passenger. Her curious and determined nature leads her to investigate, leading her to unearth a series of conspiracies related to experimental science. Romola Garai, Hattie Morahan and Olivia Poulet all provide the voice of Helen over the course of the series, alongside Jonathan Forbes as Freddy, her long-lost friend who helps her in her investigations. Most of the series is set in modern times and features Helen as narrator and protagonist; the second series, Strata, is a prequel following a different set of characters in 1980.

== Synopsis ==
The first series, Origins, follows Helen as she investigates her late father Florian, who died in a plane crash on his way to meet her for the first time, leading her, her husband Michael and her long-lost friend Freddy to unearth a large conspiracy related to her father's medical experiments and her own origins.

The second series, Strata, is a prequel set in 1980 in the wilds of Snowdonia, and follows Rachel Turner, a woman on a desperate search for her four-year-old son Joel, who went missing in an earthquake while she was looking for fossils; while looking for him, they stumble upon events relating to a strange pregnancy.

The third series, Chimera, starts as Helen finds out that she is pregnant, despite not having had sex for many months. In her attempts to find out how she became pregnant, she stumbles upon experiments related to pregnancies, which may be related to both her pregnancy and her own birth.

In the fourth series, Indigo, Helen investigates strange events relating to individuals whose mental age does not seem to match their physical age.

The fifth and final series, Abyss, follows Helen, now suffering from terminal cancer, investigating the mysterious sinking of a boat.

== Cast and characters ==
All cast members are credited per episode without categorization. Actors are listed below as main cast if they appear in at least half of a series' episodes. Unlike in episode credits, performers are not credited for appearing in a series if it is only via footage from a previous series.

Main cast

- Romola Garai (series 1, 4), Hattie Morahan (series 3) and Olivia Poulet (series 5) as Dr. Helen Ash, a primary care physician. Her life changes when she witnesses the crash of a plane which carried her father, whom she had never met before, triggering a series of investigations into his life, and a web of conspiracies; she is asocial and cold, and her physical and mental health worsens over the course of the overall story.
- Alex Beckett as Michael (series 1), Helen's supportive husband.
- Jonathan Forbes as Freddy Fuller (series 1, 3–5), a forensic pathologist and long-lost friend of Helen who reunites with her, and comes to be her best friend. Very supportive, he often helps her in her investigations.
- Sean Baker as Florian Chauvin (series 1), a scientist and Helen's estranged father. He supposedly left the family when Helen was baby, but contacts her at the beginning of the series, wanting to meet with her. His plane crashes while he travels to meet her, prompting Helen to investigate his life.
- Fiona O'Shaughnessy as Rachel Turner (main series 2; guest series 3), a paleontologist desperately looking for her son Joe in 1980 after he goes missing in an earthquake, and the narrator and main protagonist of series 2. She is revealed to be Helen's birth mother at the end of series 2, and reappears in an episode of series 3.
- Kai Owen as Ifan (series 2), a local who helps Rachel look for her missing son.
- Robert Pugh as Sam (series 2), a friend of Ifan who also helps Rachel.
- Betsan Llwyd as Afa (series 2), an elderly, mentally unstable pregnant woman whose sister, whom she lived with, recently passed away.
- Juno Robinson as Frances (recurring series 4; main series 5), Helen's daughter born during series 3. She is uniquely smart for her age, being capable to speak full sentences much earlier than most children; the circumstances behind her conception are a key plot point of series 3.
  - Frances' cries as a baby can be heard in series 3 and 4 (with no one credited), while Scarlett Courtney (who portrays several unrelated characters in the series) voices an older version of Frances dreamed-up by Helen in an episode of series 5.

Notable recurring guests

- Susan Jameson as Rosie (series 1), Helen's mother. Over the course of series 1, it is revealed that she adopted Helen, a fact which later acts as a key plot point of series 3.
- Shelley Rees as Charlotte or "Charlie" (series 2), a woman encountered by Rachel while on the search for her son.
- Dafydd Emyr as Ronny (series 2), Charlotte's romantic partner.
- Eiry Thomas as Andrea (series 3), a psychiatric nurse supervising Helen during the time she spends in a psychiatric hospital.
- Carys Eleri as Rebecca (series 3–5), Freddy's girlfriend.
- Andrew Gower as Luke (series 4), Helen's boyfriend and a policeman who investigates malpractice from health organizations.
- Georgia Henshaw as Julia (series 4), a mysterious woman who contacts Helen, seeking help for her ill mother.
- Juliet Cowan as Valerie Peluso (series 4–5), a policewoman and Luke's superior who is involved in a conspiracy relating to experimental pregnancy procedures, which Helen comes to investigate.
- Kiran Sonia Sawar as Lucy (series 5), the protective daughter of Eddy, a man who is the only witness to a shipwreck that supposedly never happened.
- Emma Fryer as Dr. Amina Nichols (series 5), the director of health at a hospital.

== Episodes ==
Volume	Episodes	Originally released	
Volume	Episodes	First released	Last released
1	9	August 9, 2016	September 27, 2016
2	6	November 6, 2017	December 4, 2017
3	9	November 1, 2018	November 27, 2018
4	10	October 28, 2019	November 8, 2019
5	9	October 26, 2020	December 21, 2020

=== Series 1 - Origins (2016) ===
No. overall	No. in season	Title	Directed by	Written by	Duration	Original release date
1	1	"Episode One"	James Robinson	Matthew Broughton	43 minutes	August 9, 2016
1	2	"Episode Two"	James Robinson	Matthew Broughton	43 minutes	August 16, 2016
1	3	"Episode Three"	Helen Perry	Matthew Broughton	44 minutes	August 23, 2016
1	4	"Episode Four"	Helen Perry	Matthew Broughton	43 minutes	August 30, 2016
1	5	"Episode Five"	James Robinson	Matthew Broughton	44 minutes	September 6, 2016
1	6	"Episode Six"	Helen Perry	Matthew Broughton	44 minutes	September 13, 2016
1	7	"Episode Seven"	Abigail le Fleming	Matthew Broughton	44 minutes	September 20, 2016
1	8	"Episode Eight"	James Robinson	Matthew Broughton	44 minutes	September 27, 2016
1	9	"Episode Nine"	James Robinson	Matthew Broughton	44 minutes	September 27, 2016

=== Series 2 - Strata (2017) ===
Note: Strata was originally released online under the format below; it later aired on BBC Radio 4 as two episodes, each comprising three of the original format's episodes. The official BBC website offers both formats, with the two-episodes format being referred to as "Omnibus Part 1" and "Omnibus Part 2".

No. overall	No. in season	Title	Directed by	Written by	Duration	Original release date
1	1	"Strata: Episode One"	James Robinson	Matthew Broughton	19 minutes	November 6, 2017
1	2	"Strata: Episode Two"	James Robinson	Matthew Broughton	12 minutes	November 6, 2017
1	3	"Strata: Episode Three"	James Robinson	Matthew Broughton	12 minutes	November 13, 2017
1	4	"Strata: Episode Four"	James Robinson	Matthew Broughton	14 minutes	November 20, 2017
1	5	"Strata: Episode Five"	James Robinson	Matthew Broughton	14 minutes	November 27, 2017
1	6	"Strata: Episode Six"	James Robinson	Matthew Broughton	16 minutes	December 4, 2017

=== Series 3 - Chimera (2018) ===
No. overall	No. in season	Title	Directed by	Written by	Duration	Original release date
1	1	"Chimera: Episode One"	James Robinson	Matthew Broughton	43 minutes	November 1, 2018
1	2	"Chimera: Episode Two"	James Robinson	Matthew Broughton	44 minutes	November 8, 2018
1	3	"Chimera: Episode Three"	Rebecca Lloyd-Evans	Matt Hartley	44 minutes	November 15, 2018
1	4	"Chimera: Episode Four"	Carl Prekopp	Lucy Catherine	44 minutes	November 22, 2018
1	5	"Chimera: Episode Five"	James Robinson	Matthew Broughton	44 minutes	November 29, 2018
1	6	"Chimera: Episode Six"	Rebecca Lloyd-Evans	Caroline Horton	44 minutes	December 6, 2018
1	7	"Chimera: Episode Seven"	James Robinson	Timothy X Atack	43 minutes	December 13, 2018
1	8	"Chimera: Episode Eight"	James Robinson	Matthew Broughton	44 minutes	November 20, 2017
1	9	"Chimera: Episode Nine"	James Robinson	Matthew Broughton	44 minutes	December 27, 2017

=== Series 4 - Indigo (2019) ===
No. overall	No. in season	Title	Directed by	Written by	Duration	Original release date
1	1	"Indigo: Episode One"	James Robinson	Matthew Broughton	13 minutes	October 28, 2019
1	2	"Indigo: Episode Two"	James Robinson	Matthew Broughton	14 minutes	October 29, 2019
1	3	"Indigo: Episode Three"	James Robinson	Matthew Broughton	13 minutes	October 30, 2019
1	4	"Indigo: Episode Four"	James Robinson	Matthew Broughton	13 minutes	October 31, 2019
1	5	"Indigo: Episode Five"	James Robinson	Matthew Broughton	13 minutes	November 1, 2019
1	6	"Indigo: Episode Six"	James Robinson	Matthew Broughton	14 minutes	November 4, 2019
1	7	"Indigo: Episode Seven"	James Robinson	Matthew Broughton	13 minutes	November 5, 2019
1	8	"Indigo: Episode Eight"	James Robinson	Matthew Broughton	14 minutes	November 6, 2019
1	9	"Indigo: Episode Nine"	James Robinson	Matthew Broughton	14 minutes	November 7, 2019
1	10	"Indigo: Episode Ten"	James Robinson	Matthew Broughton	14 minutes	November 8, 2019

=== Series 5 - Abyss (2020) ===
No. overall	No. in season	Title	Directed by	Written by	Duration	Original release date
1	1	"Abyss: Episode One"	James Robinson	Matthew Broughton	43 minutes	October 26, 2020
1	2	"Abyss: Episode Two"	James Robinson	Matthew Broughton	43 minutes	November 2, 2020
1	3	"Abyss: Episode Three"	John Norton	Caroline Horton	13 minutes	November 9, 2020
1	4	"Abyss: Episode Four"	James Robinson	Lucy Catherine	44 minutes	November 16, 2020
1	5	"Abyss: Episode Five"	James Robinson	Matthew Broughton	43 minutes	November 23, 2020
1	6	"Abyss: Episode Six"	John Norton	Katherine Chandler	43 minutes	November 30, 2020
1	7	"Abyss: Episode Seven"	James Robinson	Matthew Broughton	44 minutes	December 7, 2020
1	8	"Abyss: Episode Eight"	James Robinson	Matthew Broughton	44 minutes	December 14, 2020
1	9	"Abyss: Episode Nine"	James Robinson	Matthew Broughton	44 minutes	December 21, 2020

== Reception ==
According to the BBC, the first series of Tracks was "the most successful drama series launched by [BBC] Radio 4 in 2016."

The first episode of the series earned Nigel Newis a BBC Audio Drama Award for Best Use of Sound in an Audio Drama at the 2017 ceremony, with Broughton and producers James Robinson, Helen Perry and Abigail le Fleming earning a nomination for Best Audio Drama (Series or Serial). At the 2018 ceremony, Strata was nominated for Best Podcast or Online Only Audio Drama.

The first series won Best Fiction Podcast at the 2017 British Podcast Awards.
