= Twenty Twenty Six =

British television comedy series

- Genre: Mockumentary
- Created by: John Morton
- Written by: John Morton
- Directed by: John Morton
- Starring: Hugh Bonneville; Hugh Skinner
- Narrated by: David Tennant
- Opening theme: "Mambo No. 5"
- Country of origin: United Kingdom
- Original language: English
- No. of series: 1
- No. of episodes: 6

Production
- Executive producers: Paul Schlesinger; Nerys Evans; John Morton
- Producer: Catherine Gosling Fuller
- Editor: Robin Hill
- Camera setup: Single-camera
- Running time: 30 minutes
- Production company: Expectation

Original release
- Network: BBC Two; BBC iPlayer
- Release: 8 April – 13 May 2026

Related
- W1A; Twenty Twelve

Twenty Twenty Six is a British television comedy series written and directed by John Morton. The series is a spoof mockumentary following the organisation of the 2026 FIFA World Cup. It premiered on BBC Two on 8 April 2026, with all episodes released the same day on BBC iPlayer.

The series is a follow-up to Twenty Twelve, which followed the 2012 Summer Olympics, and W1A, which satirised the management of the BBC. It sees the reintroduction of Hugh Bonneville as his character Ian Fletcher from Twenty Twelve and W1A and Hugh Skinner as his character Will Humphries from W1A, alongside a new cast, with David Tennant's role as narrator continuing from the earlier series. The series received generally positive reviews from critics.

== Premise ==
Following on from his role at the BBC, Ian Fletcher leads the Oversight team behind the 2026 FIFA World Cup as the Director of Integrity. The series is a spoof mockumentary following the organisation of the 2026 FIFA World Cup.

Each episode follows a workweek at the Oversight HQ in Miami.

== Cast and characters ==
David Tennant narrates the series.

=== Main ===
- Hugh Bonneville as Ian Fletcher, the Director of Integrity
- Nick Blood as Phil Plank, an English ex-footballer and the VP On Pitch Protocols
- Paulo Costanzo as Nick Castellano, an Italian New York lawyer and the VP of Business and Legal Affairs
- Chelsey Crisp as Sarah Campbell, the American VP Sustainability and Climate Strategy
- Stephen Kunken as Owen Mitchell, the Canadian VP Logistics and Execution
- Jimena Larraguivel as Gabriela De La Rosa, the Mexican VP Optics and Narrative
- Alexis Michalik as Eric Van Dupuytrens, the Belgian Chief Coordinating Attaché
- Hugh Skinner as Will Humphries, Fletcher's Executive Assistant
- Joe Hewetson as Zach Linksfeld, the Lead Thread Analyst on the social media team
- Erin Kellyman as Madison Flynn, the Thought Leader and head of the social media team
- Nicole Sadie Sawyerr as Emily Nash, Van Dupuytrens' Executive Assistant
- Marli Siu as Mia So, the Sentiment Curator on the social media team

=== Recurring ===
- Belinda Stewart-Wilson as Amelia Wilson

=== Guest ===
- Tristan Gemmill as Daniel Krassman, a Miami businessman
- Anastasia Hille as Professor Gisela Fuchs, the UNHA executive director of temperature
- Janine Harouni as Amy Huffman, David Beckham's US agent and manager
- Mary Higgins as Alicia Byrd, host of the Call This Shit Out podcast
- Raffaello Degruttola as Father Pietro, the Vatican's Lead Communications Officer
- Shai Matheson as Eduardo Bustos-Flores, a hair and make-up designer
- Emily Piggford as Rachel McKinney, CNC News producer
- Matt Rippy as Ben Stratton, CNC News anchor
- Ione Butler as Alex Kessler, CNC News anchor
- Henry Ian Cusick as Vincente Guajardo, the Creative Director of the opening ceremony
- Steven Webb as Ryan Hertz, Lead Events Producer

== Episodes ==
On 30 March 2026, a two-minute short was released on BBC iPlayer, entitled Ian Fletcher: A Career, which predominantly comprises a recap of events from Twenty Twelve and W1A to (re)introduce the character and his career up to the events of Twenty Twenty Six.

All episodes were made available on BBC iPlayer on 8 April 2026.

No.	Title	Directed by	Written by	Original BBC Two air date
1	"Semi-Finals"	John Morton	John Morton	8 April 2026
Ian Fletcher arrives at the Oversight headquarters and is introduced to Eric Van Dupuytrens and the team, whom he struggles to integrate with. At the last minute, Zurich schedules the semi-finals to take place in Dallas and Atlanta, just as Ian is due to deliver a speech to an expectant Miami crowd. Meanwhile, Sarah Campbell and the social media team start a social media campaign based on the 'power of poop', which receives a like from MrBeast. Ian's former PA Will Humphries arrives unexpectedly at HQ.
2	"Heat"	John Morton	John Morton	15 April 2026
At Oversight HQ, Ian chairs a meeting of the Strategic Operations Group (SOG) to discuss a report by the United Nations Health Agency on global heating, suggesting ways of protecting players from extreme heat during the games. The social media team film content for their new YouTube channel The Far Corner, but attempts to interview the general public and Selena Gomez are unsuccessful. Will familiarises himself with the HQ. Ian struggles with his hotel accommodation and begins searching for an apartment, which Sarah offers to help him with.
3	"Ambassador"	John Morton	John Morton	22 April 2026
Potential official ambassador David Beckham struggles with technical difficulties, leading the team to appoint Megan Rapinoe instead. The social media team lead a "Spread the Pink" campaign themed around Rapinoe's hair. At the launch event, both Beckham and Rapinoe are expecting to be named ambassador, but Ian resolves the situation. Sarah appears on the Call This Shit Out podcast, which is critical of the tournament's carbon impact. She makes a gaffe referring to biodegradable condoms as "wooden condoms". Meanwhile, Sarah shows Ian around her condo, and Will attempts to set up his Oversight account.
4	"Mattheas Sivori/Wooden Condoms"	John Morton	John Morton	29 April 2026
Sarah's "wooden condoms" mistake has gone viral. Young footballer Mattheas Sivori is tipped to come out as gay, but Sivori's team dissuades the rumors and positions him as a straight ally. Sarah prepares for an interview on CNC News' World News Tonight, where she must announce FIFA's official position on LGBTQ+ players during the live broadcast. With help from Ian, she nails her interview, promoting a safe space for the players while promoting the tournament's positive climate impact.
5	"Balls"	John Morton	John Morton	6 May 2026
Inspired by Phil, the social media team plan a keepie uppie challenge campaign which they later combine with Sarah's "Shine A Light" initiative. The SOG must tackle conspiracy theories (including from US president Donald Trump) surrounding the tournament ball which contains a Huawei chip. Lionel Messi completes the keepie uppie challenge. The ball situation escalates, causing tension between Trump and Xi Jinping. Ian issues a statement to the press promoting the US and China working together. Ian is locked out of his apartment, so stays at Sarah's.
6	"Opening Ceremony"	John Morton	John Morton	13 May 2026
Weeks later, Ian is headhunted by the organisers of the 2028 Summer Olympics, but rejects the offer. Mexican film director Vincente Guajardo outlines his vision for the opening ceremony, but both Trump and Claudia Sheinbaum expect to make the opening speech. An anonymous HR complaint about an executive's conduct is investigated, which Sarah says is from her ex-husband coming after her and Ian. The White House insist on a US focus for the opening ceremony, while Sarah advocates for a focus on the Chichimecas. Sarah is headhunted by the Olympics organisers, and she discusses it with Ian. The team appeases Trump by promising to present him on the jumbotron during the ceremony. Ian reveals that he is leaving Oversight to join the Olympics team, which he reluctantly attributes to his feelings for Sarah. However, Sarah must stay behind to retain custody of her daughter. Ian thanks the team at his leaving drinks, and says goodbye to Sarah.

== Production ==
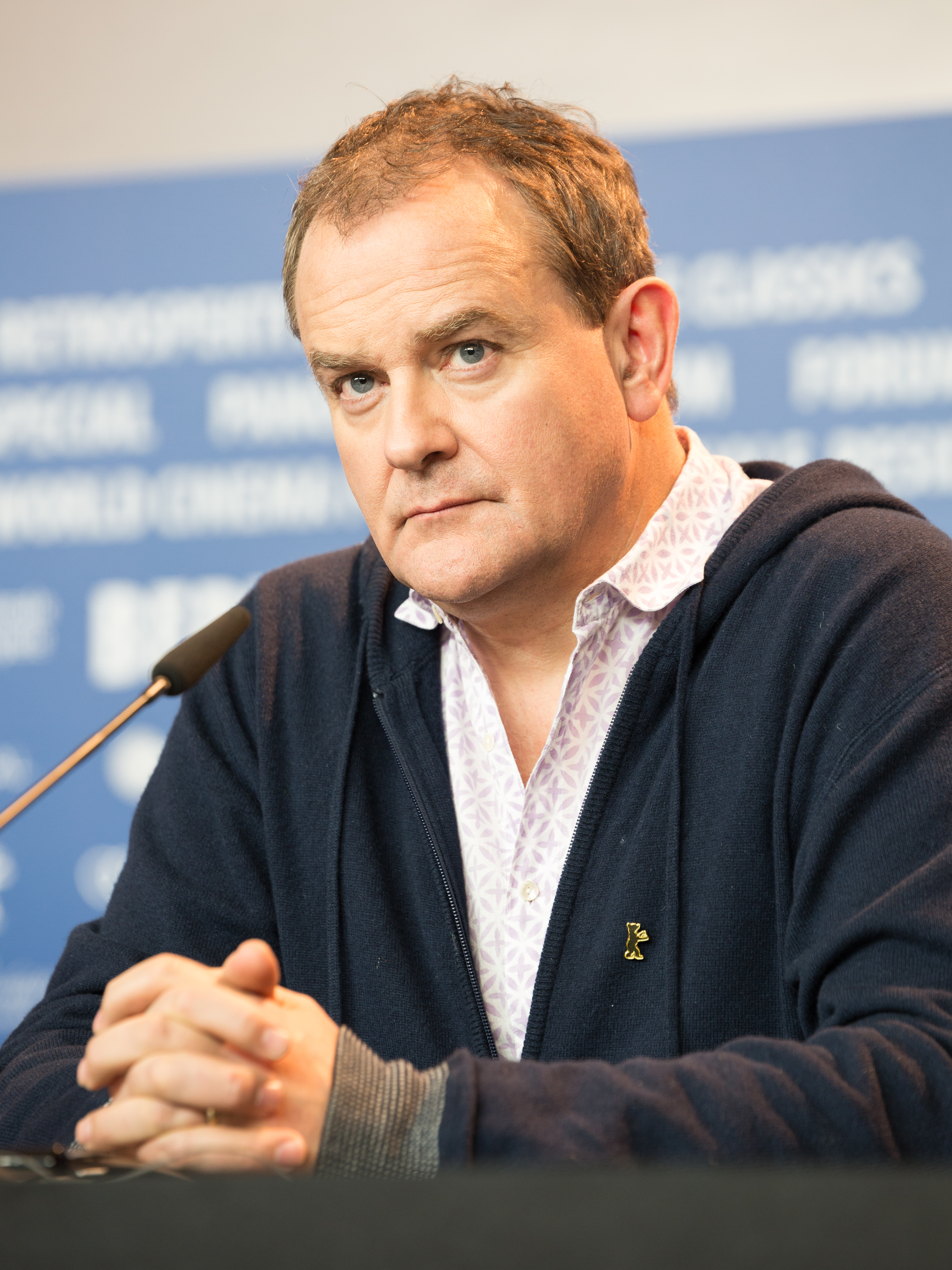
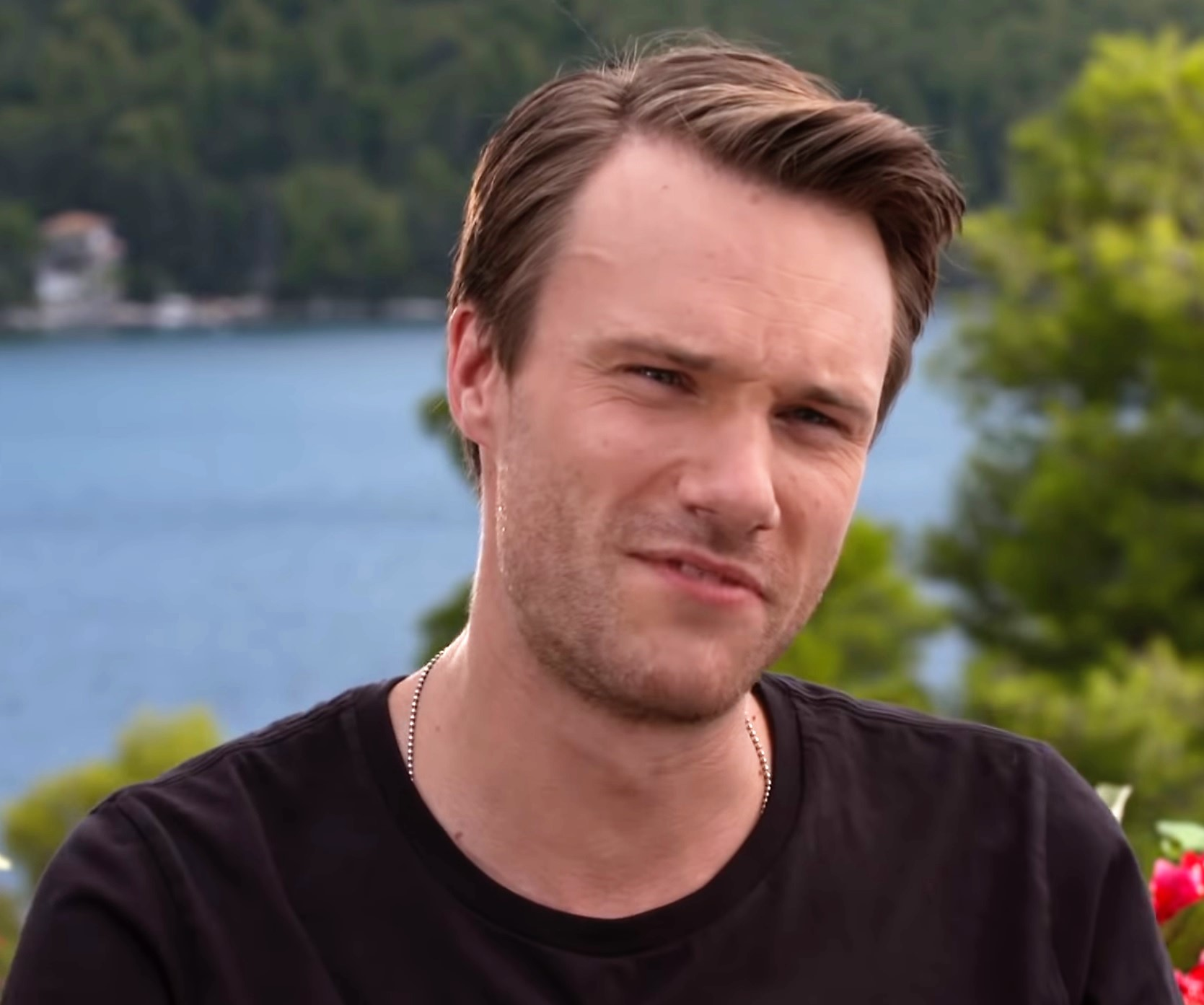
Twenty Twenty Six stars Hugh Bonneville (left) and Hugh Skinner (right).

Initially announced in June 2025, Twenty Twenty Six is a follow-up to Morton's previous series Twenty Twelve, which followed the 2012 Summer Olympics in London, and W1A, which satirised the management of the BBC, both starring Bonneville and the latter also starring Skinner, alongside a new cast. David Tennant continues his role as narrator continuing from the earlier series.

The series was filmed during summer 2025, in a school in Wembley made to look like a Miami arts centre. The nearby North Studios was also used for sets, with no filming taking place in the United States except drone footage.

Clarkson's Farm production company Expectation produced the six-episode series, taking over from the producer of Twenty Twelve and W1A, BBC Studios, who will still handle global sales. Despite being heavily influenced by the 2026 FIFA World Cup, the tournament name and all mentions of FIFA are bleeped out for comedic effect, due to "an overabundance of caution on the production's part".

== Broadcast ==
Twenty Twenty Six premiered on BBC Two on 8 April 2026, with all episodes released the same day on BBC iPlayer from 6 am.

== Reception ==
Professional ratings
Aggregate scores
Source	Rating
Metacritic	73/100
Rotten Tomatoes	80%
Review scores
Source	Rating
The Age	3/5 stars
Financial Times	2/5 stars
The Guardian	3/5 stars
The Independent	3/5 stars
The Telegraph	4/5 stars
The Times	4/5 stars

The series received generally positive reviews from critics. Sarah Dempster of The Guardian dubbed the series "a missed opportunity" but complimented Michalik's performance and Tennant's narration. The Telegraph's Benji Wilson was more positive, awarding four out of five stars. Writing in The Times, Ben Dowell also awarded four stars, calling Twenty Twenty Six "another very funny comedy".

On the review aggregator website Rotten Tomatoes, 80% of 15 critics' reviews are positive. Metacritic, which uses a weighted average, assigned the series a score of 74 out of 100, based on 6 critics, indicating "generally favourable" reviews.
