= Falling for Figaro =

2021 British-Australian romantic comedy film

- Film poster
- Directed by: Ben Lewin
- Written by: Ben Lewin; Allen Palmer
- Produced by: Judi Levine; Philip Wade
- Starring: Joanna Lumley; Danielle Macdonald; Hugh Skinner
- Cinematography: Nic Lawson
- Edited by: Peter Carrodus
- Music by: Cezary Skubiszewski
- Production companies: West End Films; Such Much Films; Particular Crowd; Southern Light Films; 5 Name Films; Black Camel Pictures
- Distributed by: Umbrella Entertainment and Paramount Pictures (Australia); Entertainment Film Distributors (United Kingdom)
- Release dates: 1 October 2021 (US); 22 October 2021 (UK); 14 July 2022 (Australia)
- Running time: 105 minutes
- Countries: Australia; United Kingdom
- Language: English
- Box office: $170,048

Falling for Figaro is a 2021 romantic comedy film written and directed by Ben Lewin, and starring Joanna Lumley, Danielle Macdonald and Hugh Skinner.

American fund manager Millie, wanting to fulfill her life-long dream to become an opera singer, quits her lucrative London job to travel to the Scottish Highlands for a year of intense vocal training from a former opera diva and faces fierce competition from other opera singers including Max, Meghan's other student.

The film was screened in the 2020 Toronto International Film Festival's Industry Selects film market in September 2020, but did not have its official public premiere until 2021 due to the COVID-19 pandemic. It was released in the United States on 1 October 2021, in the United Kingdom on 22 October 2021, and in Australia on 14 July 2022.

== Plot ==
American fund manager Millie Cantwell, whose life-long dream is to become an opera singer, quits her lucrative job in London just after being offered a promotion. Deciding to take a year to make it, she moves away from her boyfriend Charlie and travels to the Scottish Highlands for intense vocal training from former opera diva Meghan Geoffrey-Bishop.

Patricia Hartley from the London conservatory suggests Millie contact the retired diva to train for the annual competition Singer of Renown in hopes of winning a spot in an opera company. Millie convinces Geoffrey-Bishop to give her an audition by offering a very high hourly rate for lessions. The diva's only other student is Max Thistlewaite who, unable to pay in cash, works around her cottage.

Arriving in the tiny Scottish town, Millie convinces Ramsay, owner of pub The Filthy Pig, to rent her a room by mentioning a prolonged stay. Max also works in the pub, and is very agitated upon discovering Millie as his direct singing competition.

Max is openly hostile towards her when she sits in the pub. The half dozen patrons openly discuss his possibility to 'lift the curse', referring to events in his past. In the morning, Max interrupts Millie's audition by opening the spigot by the window. But, after trying to break Millie down, Meghan offers to train her.

On the morning of her first lesson, Millie discovers Max is Mrs. Geoffrey-Bishop's other student. She asks Ramsay about Max, who has been training for five years. He also will be trying to win the competition, his third and last attempt. When Millie asks Ramsay if the diva has only taken her on for the money, he points out that the whole village's income is mostly from her.

Meghan's harsh methods hurt both Millie's tongue and vocal chords. Max, seeing her pain, brings her a jug of warm salted water to gargle with. Ramsay, after hearing Millie sing in her room, approaches Meghan to suggest she not be so harsh. When Max asks, Meghan suggests the competition could be good for him as she sees potential in Millie.

Max coaches Millie a bit, and shares some books on voice theory. They both participate in an Edinburgh recital. A critic highly praises Millie while noting that Max's singing lacks feeling.

Meghan has them work on a duet together, but just as they are about to connect,, Millie's boyfriend Charlie calls. He announces he has come for a surprise visit. Max is visibly upset to know that Charlie stays the night with Millie.

When the singers practice the duet in front of Meghan the next day, she points out the piece would be more effective if they sang it to each other, although their performance did bring tears to her eyes. Later, Millie apologises to Max for Charlie's interruption of their rehearsal and asks him not to tell Meghan about her visitor. When he asks if they are engaged, she insists not.

When Meghan notices Max seems interested in Millie, she suggests he go away for a bit so that Millie misses him. When he returns in a few days to celebrate both of them being accepted to compete in Singer of Renown, they start to fool around, but Millie insists they stop. She says they should have no contact until after the competition.

Millie is the fifth of the 15. As she departs the stage, Max approaches her on bended knee to propose. Overwhelmed, Millie runs off to the restrooms. Meghan follows, then insists she give an answer. Millie hands her the ring box, to which their teacher replies Max will either sink or swim. He ends up winning.

Three years later, the now established Max has to choose between two women to replace his co-lead in Don Giovanni; one is Millie. She tells him her relationship with Charlie ended when she did not return to work with him. Max and she have a brilliant performance together.

== Cast ==
- Danielle Macdonald as Millie Cantwell (singing by Stacey Alleaume)
- Hugh Skinner as Max Thistlewaite (singing by Nathan Lay)
- Joanna Lumley as Meghan Geoffrey-Bishop
- Gary Lewis as Ramsay Macfadyen
- Shazad Latif as Charlie
- Rebecca Benson as Rosa
- Ian Hanmore as Patrick
- Bhav Joshi as Elliot
- Saskia Ashdown as Eve
- Christina Bennington as Juliet
- Jo Cameron Brown as Juliet's nurse
- Vanessa Borrini as Vanessa
- Margaret Fraser as Alexandra
- Alasdair Hankinson as stagehand
- Mark Weinman as Victor
- Andrew J. Carter as Fergus McKinnon
- Emily Mwila as Emily
- Alasdair Braxton as bellboy
- Vicki Pepperdine as Patricia

== Production and filming ==
Casting for Falling for Figaro began on 29 October 2019 with Joanna Lumley and Danielle Macdonald in the lead roles. On 13 December 2019, Hugh Skinner, Shazad Latif and Rebecca Benson joined the team.

Falling for Figaro was filmed in locations in the Scottish Highlands and Trossachs including Glencoe, Loch Lomond and two theatres in Glasgow. The production of the film was funded by Screen Australia, Screen Scotland and Film Victoria and took only two winter months to make (December–January). The film's post production was in Melbourne, Australia, in February.

The film includes music from many renowned operas, including The Barber of Seville, The Marriage of Figaro, Don Giovanni, Romeo and Juliet, La traviata, Carmen and The Magic Flute.

== Release ==
Falling for Figaro was screened for industry professionals in the 2020 Toronto International Film Festival's Industry Selects section, but was not made available for viewing by the general public. It was screened at several film festivals in 2021, including the Film by the Sea Film Festival in Vlissingen, Netherlands, the 2021 Cinéfest Sudbury International Film Festival, the Berkshire International Film Festival and the Sedona Film Festival. The film also was screened in the Official Selection at the 2021 British Film Festival.

WestEnd Films announced on 24 September 2020 that distribution rights for the film had been sold to several partners in various international markets.

Falling for Figaro was released by various distributors almost all over the world. In Australia and New Zealand, the film is distributed by Umbrella Entertainment and Paramount Pictures. In Europe, film distribution rights were given to Twelve Oaks of Spain, Splendid in Benelux, Investacommerce in former Yugoslavian states, and Entertainment Film Distributors in the United Kingdom.

The US distribution rights for the film were brought by IFC Films on 7 December 2020. According to Arianna Bocco, the newly anointed president of IFC Films, the film is planned to be released in North America in 2021.

On 9 December 2020, the deal was reached between UK and other distributors. In Japan the film is scheduled to be released via Happinet, while in South Korea, Entermode will become the distributor. The distributor for Taiwan will be Central Motion Picture Corporation, while people in the Middle East will enjoy it via Phoenicia Pictures. In Europe, Nos Lusomundo will be distributor for Portugal while in Poland it will be shown on various channels including Ale Kino+, Movie Channel, Canal+ Premium and Poland Group. Canadian distribution will be by Pacific Northwest Pictures (in theatres) and Cinesky (on airlines).

== Reception ==
On the review aggregator website Rotten Tomatoes, the film has an approval rating of 73% based on 26 critics, with an average rating of 6.5/10. On Metacritic, Falling for Figaro has a rank of 51 out of 100 from six critics, indicating "mixed or average reviews".

Frank Scheck of The Hollywood Reporter wrote "Undemanding rom-com fans and, to a lesser degree, opera lovers, should take some mild pleasure in Falling for Figaro, although the humor isn't of Gilbert and Sullivan proportions".

Guy Lodge of Variety called Falling for Figaro "A corny, cute-enough carpe diem comedy ...", while Roxana Hadadi of RogerEbert.com said "The performances are what make Falling for Figaro an entertaining distraction, even as the film plays out exactly as you would expect".

Other critics were less positive. Gary Goldstein of the Los Angeles Times wrote "It's hard to fall for Falling for Figaro". Beatrice Loayza of The New York Times admitted that "it's refreshing to see a plus-size woman not only nab the promotion and the hunky guy, but throw it all away within the first 15 minutes. Unfortunately, my plaudits for Falling for Figaro mostly end there".
