= Jon Plowman =

British television executive

Jon Plowman OBE
- Born: Phillip Jon Plowman; 1953 (age 72–73); Welwyn Garden City, Hertfordshire, England
- Education: University College, Oxford
- Occupations: Television and film producer

Phillip Jon Plowman OBE (born 1953 in Welwyn Garden City, England) is a British television and film producer. He has been a producer at the BBC since 1980, when he produced Russell Harty's chat show Harty. He moved on to executive producing at the BBC in 1986, working on sketch show A Bit of Fry and Laurie, and became Head of Comedy Entertainment in 1994, mainly responsible for sketch shows. He produced the first four series of the BBC comedy show Absolutely Fabulous between 1992 and 2001, plus the big screen version in 2016.

== Biography ==
Plowman was educated in Welwyn Garden City, Hertfordshire and at University College, Oxford, where was a member of the University College Players and made friends with others who went on to establish successful careers in comedy. One, Mel Smith, directed Plowman in a production of Rosencrantz and Guildenstern Are Dead. After Oxford, Plowman followed Smith to the Royal Court Theatre, where he met the director Lindsay Anderson. Plowman worked in theatre for a while, then joined Granada TV.

He was responsible for producing and commissioning programmes produced in-house at the BBC, of which the greatest successes include The Office and French & Saunders. Plowman became Head of Comedy in October 2005, and oversaw the BBC's in-house comedy production, but no longer commissioned programmes. In June 2007, Plowman announced he was quitting his post at the BBC after 27 years. He decided to become a freelance producer for other shows and hoped to carry on his relationship with the BBC, continuing to create programmes "for them and elsewhere."

In December 2003, The Observer named him in its list of the '50 Funniest or Most Influential People in British Comedy'. On 14 March 2006, he was honoured with the 'Judges' Award for Outstanding Contribution to British Television' at the Royal Television Society awards.

Later he moved into the world of theatre. He co-produced Lucky You, the Carl Hiaasen best-seller that premiered as a theatre production at the Edinburgh Festival Fringe in 2008.

== Honours ==
Plowman was appointed Officer of the Order of the British Empire (OBE) in the 2013 Birthday Honours for services to British comedy.

== Films produced ==
- Ab Fab: The Movie (2016)

== Programmes produced ==
- A Bit of Fry and Laurie (1986)
- French & Saunders (1987)
- Smith and Jones (1989)
- Bottom (1991)
- Absolutely Fabulous (1992)
- Kit and The Widow (1992)
- The Stand Up Show (1994)
- The Vicar of Dibley (1994)
- Alexei Sayle's Merry-Go-Round (1998)
- Goodness Gracious Me (1998)
- The Ben Elton Show (1998)
- This Morning with Richard Not Judy (1998)
- BBC New Comedy Awards (1999)
- Gimme Gimme Gimme (1999)
- Let Them Eat Cake (1999)
- People Like Us (1999)
- Sir Bernard's Stately Homes (1999)
- The League of Gentlemen (1999)
- Bruiser (2000)
- Life's A Pitch (2000)
- Mirrorball (2000)
- Rhona (2000)
- The Nearly Complete And Utter History of Everything (2000)
- The Office (2000)
- The Way It Is (2000)
- Tv to Go (2000)
- Victoria Wood With All The Trimmings (2000)
- We are History (2000)
- Aaagh! It's the Mr. Hell Show (2001)
- 15 Storeys High (2002)
- Celeb (2002)
- Cyderdelic (2002)
- Dead Ringers (2002)
- Grass (2003)
- Little Britain (2003)
- The Harringham Harker (2003)
- Doctors and Nurses (2004)
- Comic Aid (2005)
- Extras (2005)
- The Late Edition (2005)
- The Robinsons (2005)
- The Thick of It (2005)
- The Brown Couch (2006)
- Jam and Jerusalem (2006) executive producer
- The Life and Times of Vivienne Vyle (2007)
- Beautiful People (2008)
- Psychoville (2009)
- Twenty Twelve (2011)
- Way to Go (2013)
- W1A (2014–2017)
- Inside No. 9 (2014 – 2024)
