= The Barley Mow, Marylebone =

Listed pub in Marylebone, London

The Barley Mow
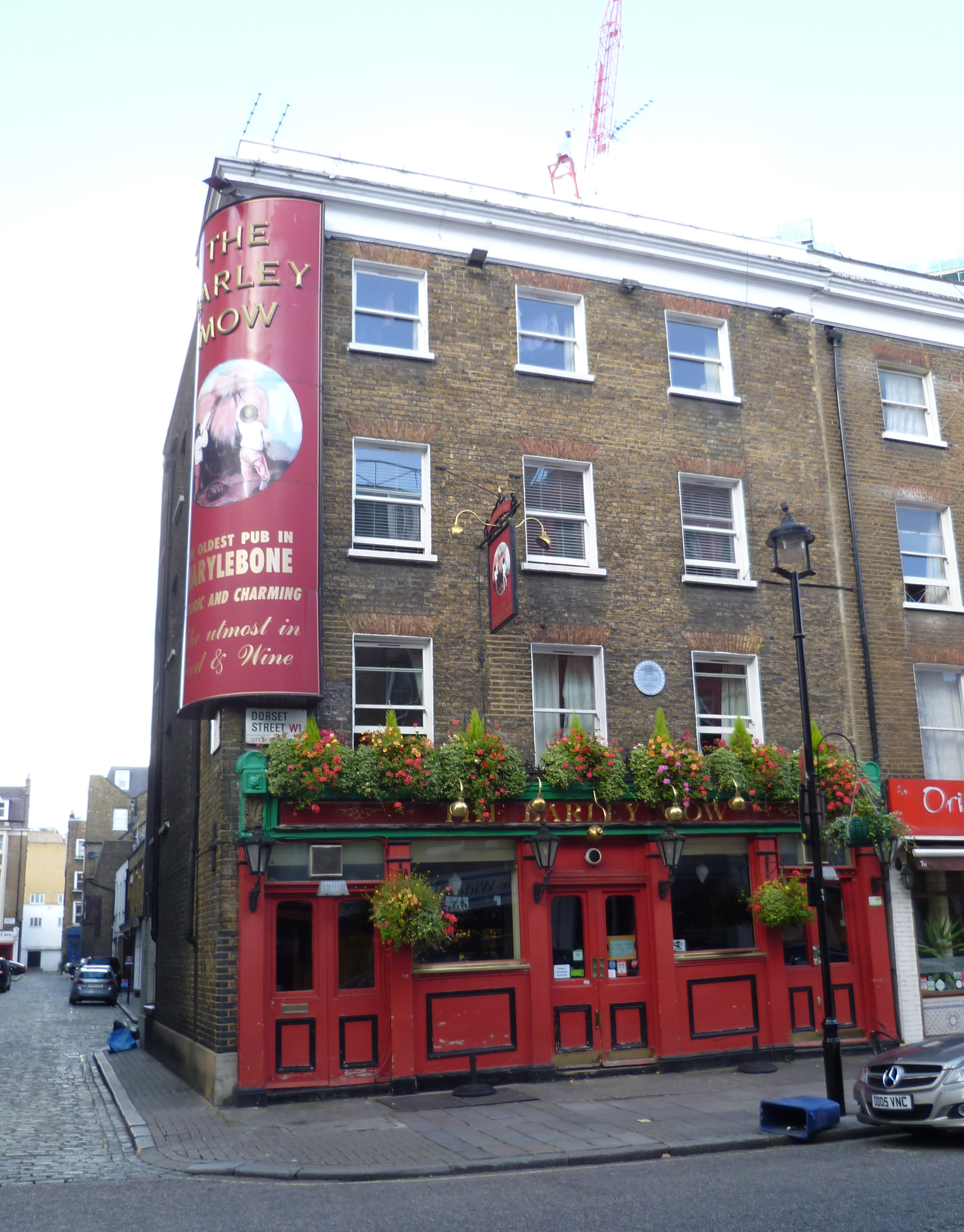
- The pub in 2016

General information
- Type: Public house
- Location: 8 Dorset Street, Marylebone, London, England
- Coordinates: 51.5197°N 0.1556°W
- Year built: 1791; 235 years ago
- Renovated: Late 19th century (frontage)
- Owner: Independent

Design and construction
- Designations

Listed Building – Grade II
- Official name: Barley Mow
- Designated: 27 July 2000
- Reference no.: 1381201

Website
- thebarleymowmarylebone.com

The Barley Mow is a Grade II listed pub on Dorset Street in Marylebone, London. Dating from 1791, it is one of the oldest surviving pubs in Marylebone and retains a late 19th-century ground-floor frontage. The pub is included on CAMRA's National Inventory of Historic Pub Interiors, where its interior is rated three stars and described as being of "outstanding national historic importance".

== History ==
The public house dates from 1791, and is one of the oldest surviving in Marylebone. The building retains a late 19th-century ground-floor frontage. According to the Campaign for Real Ale (CAMRA), the two private boxes fronting the bar counter were originally used for pawnbroking transactions by an early landlord, whose customers reportedly included employees of the Portman Estate and members of the local gentry.

The Barley Mow is regarded by CAMRA as having an interior of "outstanding national historic importance" and is rated three stars on its National Inventory of Historic Pub Interiors. The pub is independently owned, and on 27 July 2000 it was designated a Grade II listed building. The pub hosts regular live music events, a weekly quiz night on Tuesdays, and a darts league that has operated since the 1980s.

== Architecture ==
=== Exterior ===
The building occupies a corner site and is constructed of brick. It has four storeys and a traditional pub frontage of wood and glass with three sets of double doors. The upper floors each contain three sash windows facing the street, while the side elevation has a large ground-floor window, parts of which retain decorative late 19th-century glass. Additional sash windows are located on the upper storeys of the side elevation. A rear entrance was added in the late 20th century.

=== Interior ===
The interior retains a bar counter, wall panelling, and parts of the back bar dating from the 19th century. Attached to one side of the counter are two small enclosed seating compartments from the late 19th century, each with its original seating and door. Other surviving fittings include a 19th-century brass gin dispenser and brass advertising plates for spirits, one of which also displays prices. The smaller rear bar and adjoining corridor retain panelling dating from around 1800.

The pub preserves many external and internal features from the 19th century. Particularly notable are the enclosed drinking compartments, which were once common in public houses but are now a rare survival.

== See also ==
- List of pubs in London
