= Hugh Bonneville =

British actor (born 1963)

Hugh Bonneville DL
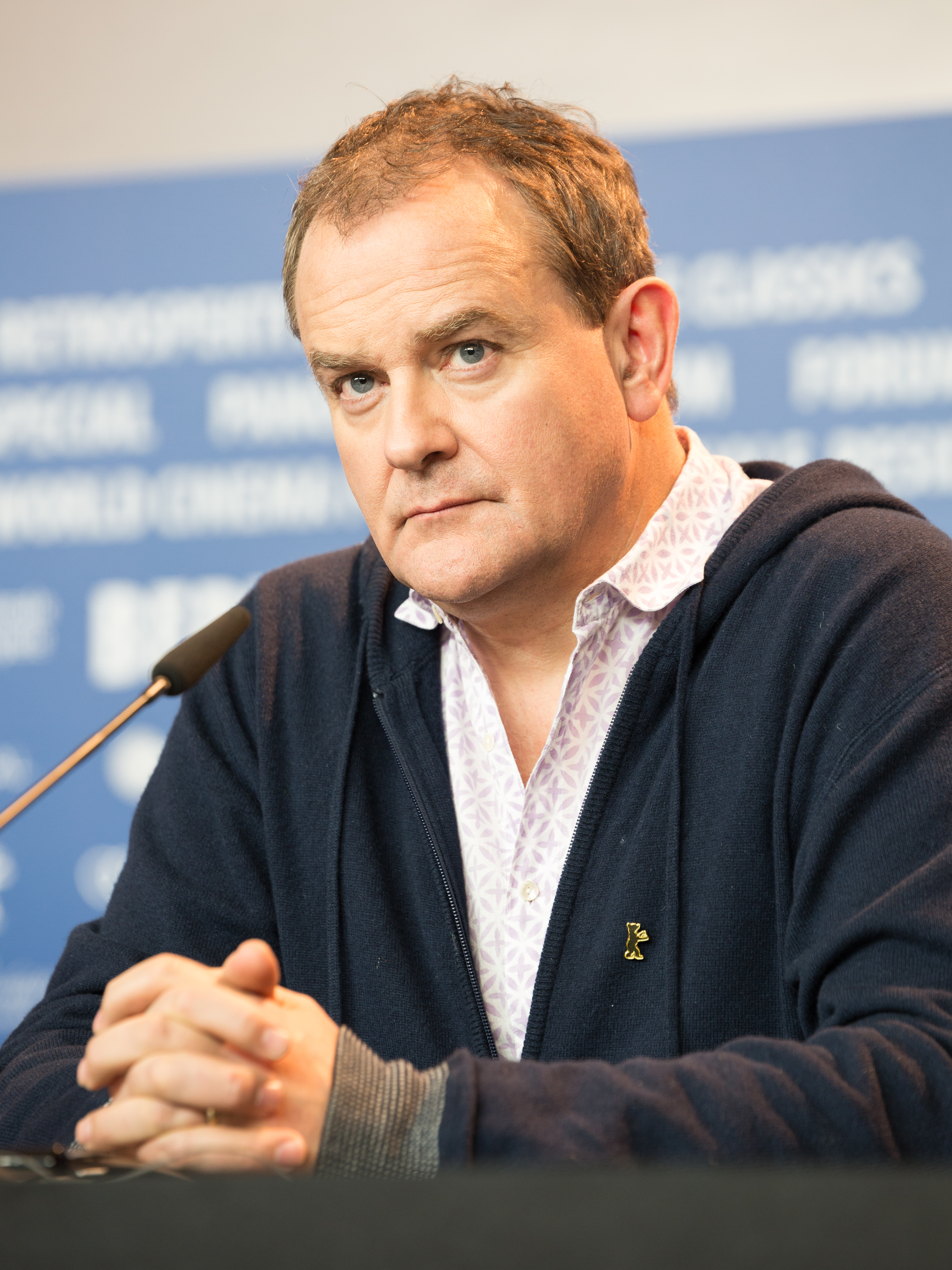
- Bonneville in 2017
- Born: Hugh Richard Bonniwell Williams; 10 November 1963 (age 63); Paddington, London, England
- Education: University of Cambridge (BA)
- Occupation: Actor
- Years active: 1990–present
- Spouse: Lucinda Williams (m. 1998; div. 2025)
- Children: 1
- Website: www.hughbonneville.co.uk

Hugh Richard Bonniwell Williams DL (born 10 November 1963), known professionally as Hugh Bonneville, is a British actor. He is best known for portraying Robert Crawley, Earl of Grantham, in the ITV historical drama series Downton Abbey from 2010 to 2015. His performance on the show earned him a nomination at the Golden Globes and two consecutive Primetime Emmy Award nominations, as well as three Actor Awards. He reprised his role in the feature films Downton Abbey (2019), Downton Abbey: A New Era (2022), and Downton Abbey: The Grand Finale (2025). He also acted in the films Notting Hill (1999), Iris (2001), The Monuments Men (2014), and the Paddington films (2014–present).

For Iris, Bonneville received a nomination for the BAFTA Award for Best Actor in a Supporting Role, which was followed by four nominations in the BAFTA Award for Best Male Comedy Performance category for portraying Ian Fletcher in Twenty Twelve (2011–2012) and W1A (2014–2017). Bonneville later reprised his role as Fletcher in Twenty Twenty Six (2026).

== Early life and education ==
Hugh Richard Bonniwell Williams was born on 10 November 1963 in Paddington, London. His mother, Patricia Adele Freeman, was a nurse and later a filing clerk for the Foreign office and the intelligence service MI6. He was educated at Dulwich College Preparatory School in south London and at Sherborne School.

Following secondary education, Bonneville read theology at Corpus Christi College, Cambridge. He graduated from Cambridge with a lower second-class degree in theology.

Bonneville is an alumnus of the National Youth Theatre.

== Career ==
=== 1990s ===
When he began acting, Bonneville chose Richard Bonneville, a variation of his middle names, as his stage name, because there was a well-known playwright named Hugh Williams. After appearing as Richard Bonneville for ten years, he changed Richard to Hugh.

Bonneville's first professional stage appearance was at the Open Air Theatre, Regent's Park. In 1987, he joined the National Theatre where he appeared in several plays, then the Royal Shakespeare Company in 1991, where he played Laertes to Kenneth Branagh's Hamlet (1992–1993). He played Valentine in The Two Gentlemen of Verona, Bergetto in 'Tis Pity She's a Whore, Kastril and later Surly in The Alchemist. Early 1994 he played Tony in Jonathan Harvey's Beautiful Thing.

In 1994, billed as Richard Bonneville, he appeared in The Memoirs of Sherlock Holmes episode "The Dying Detective". His film debut was in 1994's Mary Shelley's Frankenstein with Robert De Niro and Kenneth Branagh. In the 1997 James Bond film Tomorrow Never Dies, he had a small role playing a naval sailor onboard "HMS Bedford". His early roles were usually good-natured bumbling characters like Bernie in Notting Hill (1999) and Mr Rushworth in Mansfield Park (1999).

=== 2000s ===
In the BBC television series Take a Girl Like You (2000) and Armadillo (2001), he played more villainous characters, leading up to the domineering Henleigh Grandcourt in Daniel Deronda (2002) and the psychopathic killer James Lampton in The Commander (2003) series. In Love Again, he played the poet Philip Larkin.

In Iris (2001), he played the young John Bayley opposite Kate Winslet, with his performance lauded by critics and receiving a BAFTA nomination for Best Supporting Actor. In 2002 he played Hugh in Midsomer Murders in season 5, episode 3. In 2004, Bonneville played Sir Christopher Wren in the docudrama Wren – The Man Who Built Britain. Bonneville also works extensively in radio. He played the role of Jerry Westerby in the BBC Radio 4 dramatisation of the John le Carré novel The Honourable Schoolboy, first broadcast in January 2010. Earlier, he appeared in the surreal parallel universe comedy Married.

=== 2010s ===
From 2010 until 2015, he appeared in the ITV period drama Downton Abbey, as Robert, Earl of Grantham, a role he repeated in the 2019 film. Bonneville again reprised the role of Robert Crawley in the 2022 film Downton Abbey: A New Era.

In early 2010, he appeared in the comedy film Burke and Hare. In 2011 and 2012, he starred as Ian Fletcher in the award-winning BBC comedy series Twenty Twelve. He reprised the role in the 2014 BBC comedy series W1A and the 2026 series Twenty Twenty Six. In December 2012, he appeared on BBC Two with co-star Jessica Hynes in World's Most Dangerous Roads, travelling through Georgia. He also appeared in the much-delayed film Hippie Hippie Shake with Cillian Murphy and Sienna Miller.

From 2011 until 2014, Bonneville was the narrator of the Channel 4 show The Hotel. On 18 November 2012, Bonneville appeared on stage at St Martin's Theatre in the West End for a 60th anniversary performance of Agatha Christie's The Mousetrap, the world's longest-running play.

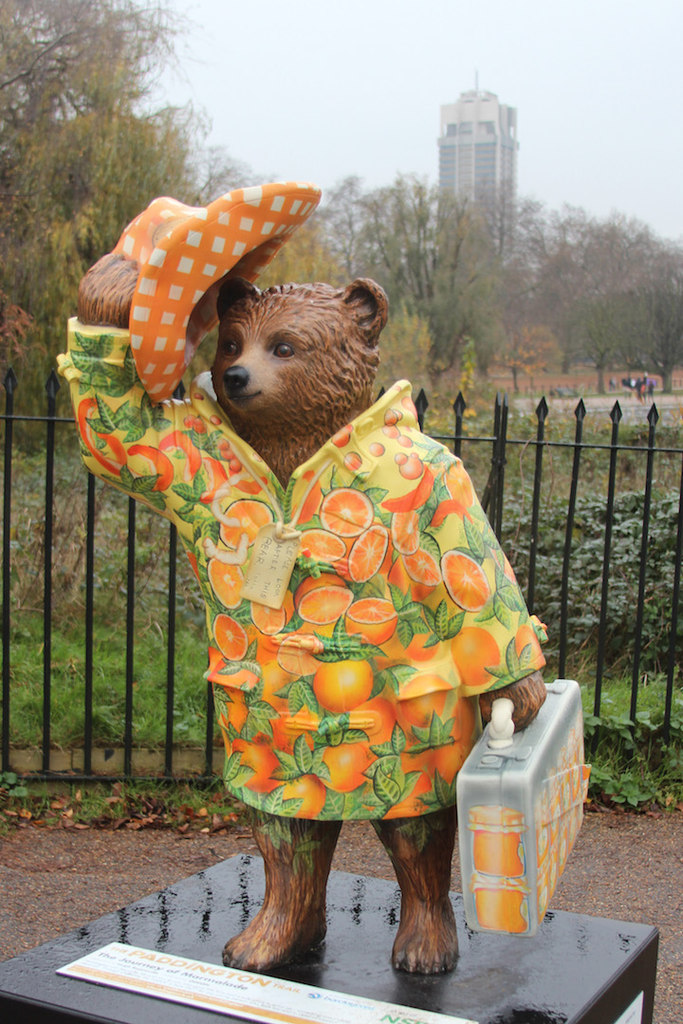
Bonneville's Paddington Bear designed statue—"The Journey of Marmalade"—in Hyde Park, London, auctioned to raise funds for the National Society for the Prevention of Cruelty to Children

Bonneville played Mr. Brown in the 2014 film Paddington and its 2017 sequel Paddington 2. He has appeared in the singing comedic role of Peter the Pillager, the Pirate King, in the ABC fairy tale-themed musical comedy extravaganza series Galavant during its 2015 and 2016 seasons. He also narrated the ITV series The Cruise.

In 2017, Bonneville portrayed Lord Mountbatten in director Gurinder Chadha's film Viceroy's House, which depicted the tumult and violence surrounding the Partition of India during the final days of British rule. Also in 2017, he portrayed the voice of Merlin in the movie based on the children's TV series Thomas & Friends, Journey Beyond Sodor. Also that year, he narrated the documentary A Return to Grace: Luther's Life and Legacy and it was announced that Bonneville would play Roald Dahl in an upcoming biopic about the author.

In 2018, Bonneville succeeded Julie Andrews as host and narrator of the annual "From Vienna: The New Year's Celebration" episode of Great Performances, broadcast on New Year's Day on PBS in the United States. Also in 2018, he returned to voice Merlin in one of the episodes of the twenty-second series of Thomas & Friends.

In 2019, Bonneville portrayed C. S. Lewis at the Chichester Festival Theatre's production of Shadowlands, along with actors Liz White and Andrew Havill.

=== 2020s ===
On 8 March 2023, Bonneville appeared on ITV’s DNA Journey with comedian, John Bishop.

On 7 May 2023, Bonneville appeared as the host of the Coronation Concert of King Charles III. In June 2023, it was announced that Bonneville would return to the third instalment of Paddington, Paddington in Peru.

In 2026, Bonneville starred in a new production of Shadowlands at the Aldwych Theatre in London, where he reprised the role of C.S. Lewis. Bonneville starred in Hong Kong film Cold War 1994.

== Personal life ==
Bonneville married Lucinda Williams in 1998. They lived with their son, Felix in West Sussex. In September 2023, the couple separated after 25 years together, and divorced in January 2025. In October 2024, Bonneville confirmed he was in a relationship with Heidi Kadlecova. He has described his current life as "blessed" after the sadness of losing his mother, father and brother, in the space of six years, followed by the breakdown of his marriage.

On 8 October 2019, he was appointed as a Deputy Lieutenant of the County of West Sussex.

=== Charity ===
In 2009, Bonneville was the voice of Justice Fosse in Joseph Crilly's British premiere of Kitty and Damnation for the Giant Olive Theatre Company at the Lion & Unicorn Theatre in Kentish Town. Shortly thereafter he became Giant Olive's first patron. Bonneville is also a patron of the London children's charities Go Live Theatre Projects and Scene & Heard, as well as an ambassador for WaterAid.

=== Politics ===
In 2025 during the premiere of Downton Abbey: The Grand Finale, Bonneville urged action in Gaza City from the international community during the Gaza war.. On 18 November 2025, the World Food Programme issued a video advertisement on social media with Bonneville requesting donations. In January 2026, Bonneville condemned Israel's decision to revoke permits of 37 non-governmental and humanitarian organisations from working in Gaza.

== Works ==
Key
†	Denotes works that have not yet been released

=== Film ===
Year	Film	Role	Notes
1994	Mary Shelley's Frankenstein	Schiller	
1997	Tomorrow Never Dies	Air Warfare Officer – HMS Bedford	
1999	Notting Hill	Bernie	
1999	Mansfield Park	Mr Rushworth	
2001	Blow Dry	Louis	
2001	High Heels and Low Lifes	Farmer	
2001	The Emperor's New Clothes	Bertrand	
2001	Iris	Young John Bayley	
2003	Conspiracy of Silence	Fr. Jack Dowling	
2004	Piccadilly Jim	Lord Wisbeach	
2004	Stage Beauty	Samuel Pepys	
2005	The Commander: Virus	James Lampton	Uncredited
2005	The Commander: Blackout	James Lampton	Uncredited
2005	Man to Man	Fraser McBride	
2005	Asylum	Max Raphael	
2005	Underclassman	Headmaster Felix Powers	
2006	Scenes of a Sexual Nature	Gerry	
2007	Four Last Songs	Sebastian Burrows	
2007	Hola to the World	Painter	Short film
2008	One of Those Days	Mr Burrell	Short film
2008	French Film	Jed	
2009	Knife Edge	Charles Pollock	
2009	Glorious 39	Gilbert Williams	
2009	From Time to Time	Captain Oldknow	
2010	Critical Eye	Brian	
2010	Shanghai	Ben Sanger	
2010	Burke & Hare	Lord Harrington	
2010	Hippie Hippie Shake	John Mortimer	Unreleased
2011	Third Star	Beachcomber	
2014	The Monuments Men	Lieutenant Donald Jeffries	
2014	Muppets Most Wanted	Irish Journalist	
2014	Paddington	Henry Brown	
2015	Stick Man	Santa Claus	Voice
2015	Silent Hours	Commander William Calthorpe	
2017	Viceroy's House	Lord Mountbatten	
2017	Paddington 2	Henry Brown	
2017	Thomas & Friends: Journey Beyond Sodor	Merlin	Voice
2017	Breathe	Teddy Hall	
2017	A Return to Grace: Luther's Life and Legacy	Narrator	
2017	Secrets of the Magna Carta	Narrator	Documentary
2019	The Corrupted	Anthony Hammond	
2019	Downton Abbey	Robert Crawley, Earl of Grantham	
2020	Jingle Jangle: A Christmas Journey	Mr. Delacroix	
2021	To Olivia	Roald Dahl	
2022	Downton Abbey: A New Era	Robert Crawley, Earl of Grantham	
2022	I Came By	Sir Hector Blake	
2022	The Amazing Maurice	The Mayor	Voice
2023	Mummies	Lord Sylvester Carnaby	Voice
2023	Bank of Dave	Sir Charles	
2023	Ozi: Voice of the Forest	Narrator	Voice
2024	Paddington in Peru	Henry Brown	
2025	Downton Abbey: The Grand Finale	Robert Crawley, Earl of Grantham	
2025	Christmas Karma	Jacob Marley	
2026	Cold War 1994	Chris Hughes	Hong Kong film
TBA	Go Away! †	Bernard	Post-production

=== Television ===
Year	Film	Role	Notes
1990	Chancer	Jas	2 episodes
1991	Dodgem	Rick Bayne	5 episodes
1993	Paul Merton: The Series	Captain	Episode: #2.6"
1993	Stalag Luft	Barton	Television movie
1994	The Memoirs of Sherlock Holmes	Victor Savage	Episode: "The Dying Detective"; Credited as Richard Bonneville
1994	Peak Practice	Dominic Kent	Episode: "Perfect Love" Credited as Richard Bonneville
1994	Cadfael	Daniel Aurifaber	Episode: "The Sanctuary Sparrow"; Credited as Richard Bonneville
1994	Between the Lines	Henry Oakes	Episode: "Close Protection"
1995	The Vet	Alan Sinclair	6 episodes
1995	EastEnders	Headmaster	Episode: "14 December 1995"
1996	Married for Life	Steve Hollingsworth	7 episodes
1996	Bugs	Nathan Pym	Episode: "Bugged Wheat"
1997	Breakout	Peter Schneider	Television movie
1997	See You Friday	Daniel	Episode: "#1.1"
1997	The Man Who Made Husbands Jealous	Ferdinand Fitzgerald	Episode: #1.1"
1997	Get Well Soon	Norman Tucker	4 episodes
1998	Heat of the Sun	Edward Herbert	Episode: "Hide in Plain Sight"
1998	Mosley	Bob Boothby	4 episodes
1998	Holding the Baby	Gordon Muir	Unknown episodes
1998	The Scold's Bridle	Tim Duggan	Television movie
1999	Murder Most Horrid	Inspector Dawson	Episode: "Confessions of a Murderer"
2000	Take a Girl Like You	Julian Ormerod	3 episodes
2000	Thursday the 12th	Brin Hopper	Television movie
2000	Madame Bovary	Charles Bovary	Television movie
2001	Hans Christian Andersen: My Life as a Fairytale	Publisher	Television movie
2001	The Cazalets	Hugh Cazalet	6 episodes
2001	Armadillo	Torquil Helvoir Jayne	TV film
2002	Midsomer Murders	Hugh Barton	Episode: "Ring Out Your Dead"
2002	Tipping the Velvet	Ralph Banner	Episode: "#1.3"
2002	Daniel Deronda	Henleigh Grandcourt	3 episodes
2002	Impact	Phil Epson	Television movie
2002	The Gathering Storm	Ivo Pettifer	Television movie
2002	Right Under My Eyes	James	Television movie
2002	The Biographer	Eric	Television movie
2002	Doctor Zhivago	Andrey Zhivago	Television movie
2003	The Commander	James Lampton	Television movie
2003	Love Again	Philip Larkin	Television movie
2003	Hear the Silence	Andrew Wakefield	Television movie
2004	Wren: The Man Who Built Britain	Christopher Wren	TV documentary
2005	The Rotters' Club	Adult Ben	Voice; 2 episodes
2005	The Robinsons	George Robinson	6 episodes
2006	Courting Alex	Julian/Charles Carter	10 episodes
2006	Beau Brummell: This Charming Man	Prince Regent	Television movie
2006	Tsunami: The Aftermath	Tony Whittaker	Television movie
2007	The Vicar of Dibley	Jeremy Ogilvy	Episode: "The Vicar in White"
2007	Five Days	DSI Iain Barclay	4 episodes
2007	The Replacements	C.L.I.V.E.	Voice; Episode: "London Calling"
2007	The Diary of a Nobody	Charles Pooter	Television movie
2007	Miss Austen Regrets	Rev. Brook Bridges	Television movie
2007–08	Freezing	Matt	3 episodes
2008	Bonekickers	Gregory Parton	6 episodes
2008	Lost in Austen	Claude Bennet	4 episodes
2008	Filth: The Mary Whitehouse Story	Sir Hugh Carleton Greene	Television movie
2008–11	Country House Rescue	Narrator	24 episodes
2009	Hunter	DSI Iain Barclay	2 episodes
2009	Ruth Watson's Hotel Rescue	Narrator	6 episodes
2009	Legally Mad	Gordon Hamm	unaired pilot
2010–15	Downton Abbey	Robert Crawley, Earl of Grantham	52 episodes
2010	Ben Hur	Pontius Pilate	2 episodes
2010	Agatha Christie's Poirot	Edward Masterman	Episode: "Murder on the Orient Express"
2010	The Silence	Chris	4 episodes
2010–14	Rev.	Roland Wise	3 episodes
2011	Doctor Who	Captain Henry Avery	Episodes: "The Curse of the Black Spot" and "A Good Man Goes to War"
2011	Marple: The Mirror Crack'd from Side to Side	Inspector Hewitt	Television movie
2011–12	Twenty Twelve	Ian Fletcher	13 episodes
2011–14	The Hotel	Narrator	33 episodes
2012	Turn Back Time: The Family	Narrator	5 episodes
2012	Getting On	Philip Moore	Episode: "#3.6"
2012	World's Most Dangerous Roads	—N/a	Episode: "#3.2"
2012	Mr Stink	Mr Stink	Television movie
2013	Da Vinci's Demons	Duke of Milan	Episode: "The Hanged Man"
2014	Top Gear	Himself	Episode: "Star in a Reasonably-Priced Car"
2014–17	W1A	Ian Fletcher	14 episodes
2015–16	Galavant	Pirate King	2 episodes
2015–18	Sofia the First	Book Narrator	Voice; 6 episodes
2016	The Hollow Crown	Gloucester	Episode: "Henry VI, Part I"
2016	Walliams & Friend	Various	Episode 7
2017	The Grand Tour	Himself	Series 2 Episode 3
2017	A Return to Grace: Luther's Life and Legacy	Narrator	Documentary
2018	Countdown to Calvary	Host/Narrator	Documentary
2018	Thomas & Friends	Merlin	Voice; Episode: "Seeing is Believing"
2018	Christmas with the Tabernacle Choir	Narrator	
2018–26	Great Performances	Host/Narrator	Episode "From Vienna: The New Year's Celebration 2018"
2018–26	Great Performances	Host/Narrator	Episode "From Vienna: The New Year's Celebration 2019"
2018–26	Great Performances	Host/Narrator	Episode "From Vienna: The New Year's Celebration 2020"
2018–26	Great Performances	Host/Narrator	Episode "From Vienna: The New Year's Celebration 2021"
2018–26	Great Performances	Host/Narrator	Episode "From Vienna: The New Year's Celebration 2022"
2018–26	Great Performances	Host/Narrator	Episode "From Vienna: The New Year's Celebration 2023"
2018–26	Great Performances	Host/Narrator	Episode "From Vienna: The New Year's Celebration 2024"
2018–26	Great Performances	Host/Narrator	Episode "From Vienna: The New Year's Celebration 2025"
2018–26	Great Performances	Host/Narrator	Episode "From Vienna: The New Year's Celebration 2026"
2019	Last Week Tonight with John Oliver	Narrator	2 episodes
2020	Sandylands	One-Eyed Man	2 episodes
2020–22	Amphibia	Wigbert Ribbiton	Voice; 2 episodes
2020	DuckTales	Santa Claus	Voice; Episode: "How Santa Stole Christmas"
2022	The Hidden Lives of Pets	Narrator	Documentary series
2022	Secrets of the Royal Gardens	Narrator	Documentary series
2023	The Gold	DCI Brian Boyce	12 episodes
2023	DNA Journey	Himself	Episode: "John Bishop and Hugh Bonneville"
2023	Coronation Concert	Host	
2024	The Completely Made-Up Adventures of Dick Turpin	Jonathan Wild	4 episodes
2024	Douglas Is Cancelled	Douglas Bellowes	4 episodes
2024	The Secret Lives of Animals	Narrator	Documentary series
2024–present	The Agency	James Richardson	12 episodes
2025	The Simpsons	Narrator	Voice; episode: "Yellow Planet"
2026	Twenty Twenty Six	Ian Fletcher	6 episodes
2026	The Gentlemen	Lord Hawthorne	2 episodes

=== Audiobooks ===
Year	Book Title	Role	Notes
2004	Birds Without Wings	Narrator	
2014	Goldfinger	Narrator	
2016	Paddington Takes the Test	Narrator	
2016	Paddington At Large	Narrator	
2016	Paddington Marches On	Narrator	
2016	Paddington Abroad	Narrator	
2016	Paddington Helps Out	Narrator	
2017	Paddington At Work	Narrator	
2017	On the Banks of Plum Creek	Narrator	
2017	Paddington Goes to Town	Narrator	
2017	Farmer Boy	Narrator	
2018	Paddington Takes the Air	Narrator	
2018	Paddington On Top	Narrator	
2021	Absolute Proof	Narrator	
2022	Late Summer On State Street	Narrator	
2024-2026	Sherlock Holmes Short Stories	Narrator	Podcast series

=== Books ===
Release Date	Title	Publisher	ISBN
13 October 2022	Playing Under the Piano: From Downton to Darkest Peru	Little, Brown Book Group	978-1408716830
9 October 2025	Rory Sparkes and the Elephant in the Room	Bloomsbury Children's Books	978-1526685964

== Awards ==
Year	Award	Category	Project	Result
2001	British Academy Film Award	Best Supporting Actor	Iris	Nominated
2001	European Film Award	Best Actor	Iris	Nominated
2002	Berlin International Film Festival	New Talent Award	Iris	Won
2006	Monte-Carlo Television Festival	Outstanding Actor in a Miniseries	Tsunami: The Aftermath	Nominated
2012	Primetime Emmy Award	Outstanding Actor in a Drama Series	Downton Abbey	Nominated
2013	Primetime Emmy Award	Outstanding Actor in a Drama Series	Downton Abbey	Nominated
2011	Golden Globe Awards	Best Actor – Miniseries or Television Film	Downton Abbey	Nominated
2012	Screen Actors Guild Awards	Outstanding Ensemble in a Drama Series	Downton Abbey	Won
2013	Screen Actors Guild Awards	Outstanding Ensemble in a Drama Series	Downton Abbey	Nominated
2014	Screen Actors Guild Awards	Outstanding Ensemble in a Drama Series	Downton Abbey	Won
2015	Screen Actors Guild Awards	Outstanding Ensemble in a Drama Series	Downton Abbey	Won
2016	Screen Actors Guild Awards	Outstanding Ensemble in a Drama Series	Downton Abbey	Nominated
2011	Monte-Carlo Television Festival	Outstanding Actor in a Drama Series	Downton Abbey	Nominated
2013	Monte-Carlo Television Festival	Outstanding Actor in a Drama Series	Downton Abbey	Nominated
2011	British Comedy Awards	Best TV Comedy Actor	Twenty Twelve	Nominated
2012	British Comedy Awards	Best TV Comedy Actor	Twenty Twelve	Nominated
2012	British Academy Television Award	Best Actor in a Comedy Programme	Twenty Twelve	Nominated
2013	British Academy Television Award	Best Actor in a Comedy Programme	Twenty Twelve	Nominated
2015	British Academy Television Award	Best Actor in a Comedy Programme	W1A	Nominated
2016	British Academy Television Award	Best Actor in a Comedy Programme	W1A	Nominated

== Honours ==
=== Commonwealth honours ===
Commonwealth honours

Country	Date	Appointment	Post-nominal letters
United Kingdom	8 October 2019 – Present	Deputy Lieutenant of West Sussex	DL

=== Scholastic ===
University degrees

Location	Date	School	Degree
England		Corpus Christi College, Cambridge	Lower Second Class Honours Bachelor of Arts (BA) in Theology
England		Webber Douglas Academy of Dramatic Art	

Honorary degrees

Location	Date	School	Degree	Gave Commencement Address
England	October 2019	University of Winchester	Doctor of Arts (D.Arts)	
England	September 2024	University of Chichester	Doctor of Theatre	
