= Betsan Llwyd =

British actor

Betsan Llwyd is a Welsh actor and theatrical and television director.

In 2012, she was appointed Arts Director of Bara Caws, a community theatre that performs in the Welsh language.

She has been awarded actress awards by BAFTA Cymru in 1995 and in 2001.

She has enjoyed success in the National Theatre of Wales with Ty Bernarda Alba and Y Pair and at Theatr Clwyd in Mold with Salt, Root and Roe, Gas Light and Pygmalion On the Welsh television channel S4C she has been seen in Sonbreros and Pen Talaras well as having frequent appearances in Pobol y Cwm a Welsh language soap opera. She features in the Welsh language version of BBC drama Keeping Faith on S4C, Un Bore Mercher, and has a regular role in Young Dracula for the BBC.
