= Hugh Skinner =

British actor

Hugh William Skinner
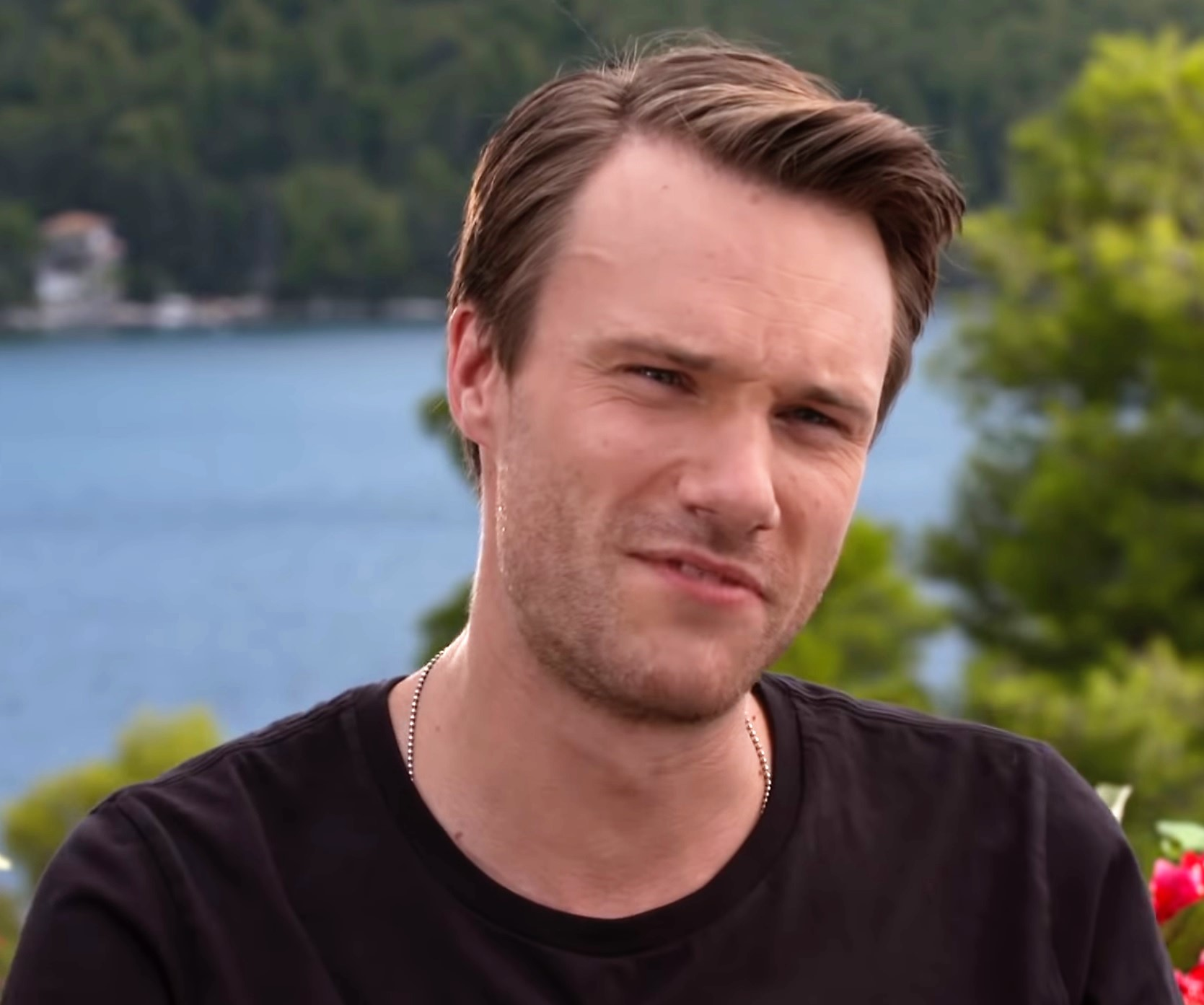
- Skinner in 2018
- Born: London, England
- Education: London Academy of Music and Dramatic Art
- Occupation: Actor
- Years active: 2007–present

Hugh Skinner is an English actor. He is best known for starring in sitcoms W1A (2014–2017) and The Windsors (2016–2023), and his appearances in musical films Les Misérables (2012) and Mamma Mia! Here We Go Again (2018).

== Early life and education ==
Hugh Skinner grew up in London, Tunbridge Wells, and Eastbourne. He lived in Perth, Australia, for a year at age 4.

He attended Eastbourne College from 1998 to 2003. He graduated from the London Academy of Music and Dramatic Art in 2006.

== Career ==
=== Early work (2007–2015) ===
Skinner's first professional acting role was in the English Touring Theatre's 2007 production of French Without Tears. In addition to his work on stage, he played supporting roles in the BBC series Tess of the D'Urbervilles as Felix Clare in 2008, and Any Human Heart as Lionel in 2010. He also played the role of Joly, one of the student revolutionaries, in the 2012 film of Les Misérables.

In the autumn of 2013, Skinner played the role of Luis Carruthers, a closeted gay man who is in love with the show's protagonist, Patrick Bateman, in the world premiere of American Psycho at the Almeida Theatre. He also appeared on the London cast album, which was released in 2016. While performing in American Psycho, he began filming the first series of the comedy W1A, playing the role of Will Humphries, an inept yet endearing intern at the BBC. The first series was released in 2014, with subsequent series airing on BBC2 in 2015 and 2017.

Skinner played the role of Dr. Barnaby Ford in the BBC series Our Zoo. He also appeared at the Theatre Royal, Bath as Camille in Helen Edmundson's adaptation of Thérèse Raquin, and as Yepikhodov in Simon Stephens' new translation of The Cherry Orchard at the Young Vic. He returned to the Young Vic in the summer of 2015 to play dual roles in Nick Gill's adaptation of The Trial. In the autumn of 2015, it was announced that he had been cast as Unwin Trevaunance, an aspiring Member of Parliament, in the second series of the BBC production of Poldark, which aired in 2016.

=== Breakthrough (2016–present) ===
Skinner starred in The Windsors, a spoof of the British royal family, as Prince William which aired on Channel 4 in 2016. The same year, he had a role in Fleabag, a BBC3 and Amazon production, where he played the protagonist's hapless boyfriend Harry. The following year, he played Sir George Howard in the first series of Harlots, an 18th-century costume drama that premiered on ITV Encore and Hulu in March. Also in 2017, he played a supporting role in Hampstead opposite Diane Keaton and Brendan Gleeson, and appeared in Star Wars: The Last Jedi.

Skinner co-starred in Mamma Mia! Here We Go Again, the 2018 sequel to the 2008 film Mamma Mia!, in which he played Young Harry, a version of the character originated by Colin Firth in the first film. In 2018 he also starred in the eighth and final episode of Matthew Weiner's anthology series The Romanoffs, playing the role of Simon Burrows.

He reprised his role as Harry in series 2 of Fleabag, which was released on BBC3 in March 2019 and was released on Amazon Prime in May 2019. On 5 April 2019, it was announced that Skinner had joined the cast of the period drama Little Birds, which premiered on Sky Atlantic in August 2020. In December 2019, it was announced that he would be co-starring in the film Falling for Figaro with Danielle Macdonald and Joanna Lumley. In September 2021, he featured in the Radiohead music video for the song "If You Say the Word".

He played Colin "a gay, lovelorn English soldier on a midnight mope through Paris", with "an understandable air of stiff-upper-lipped befuddlement", opposite Chiara Mastroianni in Christophe Honoré's film Marcello Mio. It premiered at Cannes in May 2024. In 2026, Skinner reprised his W1A role in Twenty Twenty Six.

== Personal life ==
Skinner is gay.

== Acting credits ==
=== Film ===
Year	Title	Role	Notes	Ref.
2008	Day of the Dead	Kyle		
2012	Les Misérables	Joly		
2015	Kill Your Friends	John		
2017	Hampstead	Erik		
2017	Star Wars: The Last Jedi	Geno Namit		
2018	Mamma Mia! Here We Go Again	Young Harry		
2019	Steven Berkoff's Tell Tale Heart	Sunny		
2021	Falling for Figaro	Max		
2022	The Invitation	Oliver Alexander		
2023	Wicked Little Letters	Constable Papperwick		
2024	Marcello Mio	Colin		
2026	Frank and Percy †		Post-production	
TBA	Real Love (Yes, It's Real Love!)	Newman		

=== Television ===
Year	Title	Role	Notes	Ref.
2007	Bonkers	Daniel	Episode 6	
2008	Tess of the D'Urbervilles	Felix Clare	Miniseries; 4 episodes	
2010	Any Human Heart	Lionel Mountstuart	Miniseries; 2 episodes	
2011	Law & Order: UK	Ian Naylor	Episode: "The Wrong Man"	
2013	The Wipers Times	Barnes	Television film	
2014	Our Zoo	Dr. Barnaby Ford	Miniseries; 4 episodes	
2014–2017	W1A	Will Humphries	Main role; 15 episodes	
2015	Bugsplat!	James	Television film	
2016	Poldark	Unwin Trevaunance	Series 2; 5 episodes	
2016–2019	Fleabag	Harry	Main role; 6 episodes	
2016–2023	The Windsors	Wills	Main role	
2017–2018	Harlots	Sir George Howard	Main role (series 1); guest star (series 2)	
2018	The Romanoffs	Simon Burrows	Episode 8: "The One That Holds Everything"	
2018	Zog	Zog	Television film; voice	
2020	Little Birds	Hugo Cavendish-Smyth	Main role; 6 episodes	
2020	Zog and the Flying Doctors	Zog	Television film; voice	
2023	The Witcher	Prince Radovid	Series 3	
2023	Partygate	Josh Fitzmaurice	Television docudrama	
2026	Twenty Twenty Six	Will Humphries	Main role; 6 episodes	
2026	Two Weeks in August	Jacob	Main cast	
TBA	The Portrait of a Lady †	Casper Goodwood	Upcoming six-part series	

=== Theatre ===
Year	Title	Role	Director	Venue	Notes	Ref.
2007	French Without Tears	Kit	Paul Miller	Various venues	English Touring Theatre	
2007	Senora Carrar's Rifles	Jose	Paul Hunter	Young Vic		
2007	The Enchantment	Viggo	Paul Miller	Royal National Theatre		
2008	Angry Young Man	D	Ben Woolf	West End; Trafalgar Studios		
2009	The Great Game	Ensemble	Nicolas Kent & Indhu Rubasingham	Tricycle theatre		
2009	suddenlossofdignity.com	Various	Josie Rourke	Bush Theatre		
2009	2 May 1997	Ian	George Perrin	Bush Theatre		
2010	'Tis Pity She's a Whore	Giovanni	Chris Meads	Liverpool Everyman		
2011	Where's My Seat	Conor	Tamara Harvey	Bush Theatre		
2011	You Can't Take It With You	Tony	Paul Hunter	Manchester Royal Exchange		
2012	Wild Oats	Harry	Mark Rosenblatt & Catherine Alexander	Bristol Old Vic		
2013	Pastoral	Manz	Steve Marmion	Soho Theatre		
2013–2014	American Psycho	Luis	Rupert Goold	Almeida Theatre		
2014	Thérèse Raquin	Camille	Jonathan Munby	Theatre Royal, Bath		
2014	The Cherry Orchard	Yephidikhov	Kate Mitchell	Young Vic		
2015	The Trial	Kyle/Block	Richard Jones	Young Vic		
2024-5	The Importance of Being Earnest	Jack Worthing	Max Webster	Lyttelton Theatre, National Theatre		

=== Music videos ===
Year	Title	Artist	Notes	Ref.
2016	How To Recognise A Work Of Art	Meilyr Jones		
2021	If You Say the Word	Radiohead		

=== Audio dramas ===
Year	Title	Role	Notes	Ref.
2019	Torchwood: Monthly Range	Sebastian Vaughn	Episode: "The Vigil"	
2022	The Lone Centurion	Sir Lancelot	3 episodes	
