= SatireWire =

American news satire website

From 1999 to 2002, and restarted in 2010 SatireWire is a news satire website. Based in Connecticut and founded by Andrew Marlatt, the site aimed its satire at politics, business, the media, and current events, and spawned Marlatt's 2002 book Economy of Errors (Random House), which was a parody of the rise and fall of the Internet economy and the stock market.

During its initial run, SatireWire, like its peer The Onion, was regularly nominated for the Webby Awards, and its stories were continuously emailed around the Internet, most notably a story entitled "China, Libya, Syria form Axis of Just as Evil" in response to President George W. Bush's "Axis of Evil" speech. This story was also included in Salman Rushdie's 2002 book Step Across This Line. Many SatireWire pieces were also published by magazines and newspapers such as the Washington Post, Fortune, and the National Post. While its subjects were wide-ranging, SatireWire is perhaps best remembered for its business humor, including the 2001 story "Sally Struthers Begs You to Save the Dot-Coms", written in response to the collapse of Internet stocks, "Remaining U.S. CEOs Make a Break for It", about a band of roving CEOs who plunder their way to the Mexican border, and "Religious Merger Creates 900 Million Hinjews".

Marlatt left SatireWire to write comedy for the BBC, among others. In January 2006, he served as a member of the judging panel for the HumorFeed Satire News Awards.

In 2010 Marlatt brought the site back and began writing new content.

== Bibliography ==
- Economy of Errors (2002)
- 101 Damnations (Contributor 2002)
- Mirth of a Nation 3 (Contributor 2004)

== See also ==
- List of satirical magazines
- List of satirical news websites
- List of satirical television news programs
