= People Like Us (mockumentary) =

UK mockumentary

- DVD cover
- Genre: Mockumentary Surrealism
- Running time: 30 minutes
- Country of origin: United Kingdom
- Language: English
- Home station: BBC Radio 4
- TV adaptations: People Like Us
- Starring: Chris Langham
- Written by: John Morton
- Produced by: Paul Schlesinger
- Original release: 10 June 1995 – 9 August 1997
- No. of series: 3 (radio); 2 (TV)
- No. of episodes: 17 (radio); 12 (TV)
- Audio format: Stereophonic sound
- Ending theme: Unsquare Dance by Dave Brubeck (radio)

People Like Us is a British radio and TV comedy programme, a spoof on-location documentary (or mockumentary) written by John Morton, and starring Chris Langham as Roy Mallard, an inept interviewer. Originally a radio show for BBC Radio 4 in three series from 1995 to 1997, it was made into two television series for BBC Two broadcast between September 1999 and June 2001.

== Radio version ==
Each episode features the affable, bumbling BBC journalist Roy Mallard following a day in the lives of representatives of a particular career or lifestyle. A comedy of wordplay and misunderstanding, People Like Us builds on an inept protagonist helpless as forced to relate to the absurdity incarnated in the "professionals" he meets, where his relatively sensible inquiry fails in front of the disproportionate facts.

A regularly recurring joke is that of the shocked reactions Mallard gets as he reveals he is married – ranging from disbelief to exaggerated congratulations, from invitations to be more realistic to database systems refusals to accept such a piece of data. These bewilderments may root in the frequent hints throughout the episodes that Mallard is not just oddly looking (e.g. the patient at the doctor's recognizing walls and windows but giving up deciding what Mallard was), but terribly dishevelled – as it is even seen in one extremely rare shot including him in the video recording (as he is helping fixing presentation equipment). Another recurring theme is Mallard's quest for a coffee, or a meal, or even a room fit for a good night's sleep.

The character of Roy Mallard was based on an exaggeration of the writer John Morton himself. Morton had been a fan of Chris Langham's performances since seeing him on Smith and Jones, and had Langham's voice in mind when he was writing the scripts.

At the end of each episode, as Dave Brubeck's "Unsquare Dance" is played, the mockumentary cast is credited as a list of people to which Roy Mallard is grateful («Roy Mallard would like to give a special "thank you" to Chris Langham...»).

The radio show was named Best Radio Comedy at the British Comedy Awards in both 1996 and 1997 as well as winning a gold Sony Radio Award for best comedy.

== Television version ==
Eleven of the radio episodes were adapted for TV, with one original episode – "The Actor". The TV version featured an array of acclaimed guest stars including Bill Nighy, David Tennant, Geoffrey Whitehead and Tamsin Greig.

Mallard is hardly visible in the TV episodes. He is usually just out of sight, but viewers can spot him, or part of him, in every episode; on one occasion he is reflected with the camera in a shop window. Much of the humour is verbal as characters take a literal interpretation of what others say, use redundant expressions and non-sequiturs. Alongside this verbal aspect there was more conventional humour. Mallard encountered bizarre behaviour from his featured characters and their counterparts. For all his own mediocrity and haplessness he could appear sane and competent compared to those alongside him. The lack of laugh track and the dead-pan approach led some viewers to believe they were encountering a "straight" documentary.

A third series was planned but was cancelled in favour of The Office.

The TV version was well received, with the first series winning the 1999 Silver Rose d'Or for comedy.

=== Home video release ===
The first TV series was released on VHS and DVD on 16 September 2002. The second was due to be released in 2003 but was cancelled, eventually being released (in Australia only) in November 2007. In September 2009 the complete two series were released in the United States on region 1 NTSC DVD. The second series was finally released on DVD in the UK on 24 May 2010.

== List of episodes ==
=== Radio series ===
Series	Episode	Title	First broadcast
1	1	The Farmer	10 June 1995
1	2	The Headmaster	17 June 1995
1	3	The Journalist	24 June 1995
1	4	The Vicar	1 July 1995
1	5	The Doctor	8 July 1995
1	6	The Solicitor	15 July 1995
Special	1	Unnamed (a.k.a. The Christmas Panto)	23 December 1995
2	1	The Managing Director	8 June 1996
2	2	The Artist	15 June 1996
2	3	The Ski Courier	22 June 1996
2	4	The Estate Agent	29 June 1996
2	5	The Policeman	6 July 1996
2	6	The Hotel Manager	13 July 1996
3	1	The Mother	19 July 1997
3	2	The Bank Manager	26 July 1997
3	3	The Air Line Pilot (a.k.a. The Pilot)	2 August 1997
3	4	The Photographer	9 August 1997

=== Television series ===
Series	Episode	Title	First broadcast
1	1	The Managing Director	20 September 1999
1	2	The Estate Agent	27 September 1999
1	3	The Police Officer	4 October 1999
1	4	The Solicitor	11 October 1999
1	5	The Photographer	18 October 1999
1	6	The Head Teacher	25 October 1999
2	1	The Vicar	20 May 2001
2	2	The Mother	27 May 2001
2	3	The Journalist	3 June 2001
2	4	The Actor	10 June 2001
2	5	The Bank Manager	17 June 2001
2	6	The Airline Pilot	24 June 2001
