= Dungeons & Dragons (disambiguation) =

Dungeons & Dragons is a fantasy role-playing game.

Dungeons & Dragons may also refer to:

- Dungeons & Dragons (1974), the original edition of the game
- Dungeons & Dragons (TV series), an animated television series
- Dungeons & Dragons (film series), a series of films adapting the game
  - Dungeons & Dragons (2000 film), a live-action fantasy film directed by Courtney Solomon
  - Dungeons & Dragons: Wrath of the Dragon God, a 2005 live-action fantasy film directed by Gerry Lively, a stand-alone sequel to the year 2000 film
  - Dungeons & Dragons 3: The Book of Vile Darkness, a 2012 live-action fantasy film directed by Gerry Lively, a sequel to the year 2005 film
  - Dungeons & Dragons: Honor Among Thieves, a 2023 live-action fantasy film directed by Jonathan Goldstein and John Francis Daley
- Dungeons & Dragons (IDW Publishing), a comic book series based on the role-playing game
- Dungeons & Dragons novels
- "Dungeons and Dragons", a comedy sketch by the Dead Alewives on Take Down the Grand Master
- Dungeons & Dragons (album), an album by Midnight Syndicate
- "Dungeons & Dragons", an episode of Terminator: The Sarah Connor Chronicles

== See also ==
- Advanced Dungeons & Dragons, An updated version of D&D
- Dunces and Dragons, SpongeBob SquarePants television special
- D&D (disambiguation)
- List of Dungeons & Dragons video games
- List of Wizards of the Coast products
