= Clare Thomson =

British comedian and actor

Clare Thomson is a UK-based actor most well known for her appearances in comedy shows like Katy Brand's Big Ass Show and Cardinal Burns. She has also appeared at the Liverpool Playhouse in the role of Renee of No Wise Men.

== Career ==
Thomson collaborated with Sarah Kendall, Alice Lowe and Barunka O'Shaughnessy in 2008 to produce the comedy sketch show Beehive for digital channel E4.
