= Sarah Kendall =

Australian comedian (born 1976)

- Born: 3 August 1976 (age 50); Newcastle, New South Wales, Australia
- Occupations: Comedian, actress
- Known for: Frayed (2019); Taskmaster (2021)
- Spouse: Henry Naylor (divorced)
- Children: 2

Sarah Kendall (born 3 August 1976) is an Australian comedian from Newcastle, New South Wales. She won the Raw Comedy competition in 1998 and appeared regularly on Australian television. She moved to the United Kingdom in 2000 at the age of 24.

== Early life ==
Kendall grew up in Newcastle, New South Wales and attended Merewether High School. She moved on to Sydney University at the age of 18. She began her career in 1996 partaking in the annual 'Review' show. Of it she said: “It started at university where there was a stand-up competition which some of my friends said I should do but I was too scared to do it. I was a genuine coward about it all and that in itself started to bug me, so eventually I got up on stage. I hated every single minute of it and was sick beforehand. But that made me even more determined because I couldn't work out why my fear was so disproportionate to the thing I was doing. It was just me talking for five minutes and so what if I got booed off stage. After about seven or eight years I eventually got it under control.”

== Career ==
=== Stand-up comedy ===
Kendall has performed solo shows at the Edinburgh Festival Fringe since 2003, with her 2004 show being nominated for the Perrier award. She has also performed in the Melbourne Comedy Festival since 2000.

In February 2003 she was in Greenwich, London, performing at Up The Creek comedy club, alongside Jimmy Carr.

In an article in The Guardian on 2 August 2014 Kendall talked about how she has reviewed her own comic response to a heckler who threatened her with sexual violence during a routine. She said, "I built a routine around it – but looking back, I betrayed the seriousness of the incident". Kendall remarked that she dropped the routine because it started to sit uncomfortably with her.

=== Television and radio ===
Kendall has been a guest on the BBC Radio 2 comedy show Parsons and Naylor's Pull-Out Sections.

She was part of an all-female sketch comedy show called Beehive also starring Alice Lowe, Barunka O'Shaughnessy and Clare Thomson, which was aired on E4.

She was a guest stand up comic on BBC Three's Russell Howard's Good News.

From 2010, she took the role of Libby Prentice, an Australian character introduced in Series 6 of the BBC Radio 4 series Clare in the Community.

On 23 November 2012, Kendall appeared on BBC Radio 4's satirical news show The Now Show, and on 4 May 2015 appeared in The Vote Now Show, one of six election specials.

Kendall appeared on the Dave TV series Alan Davies: As Yet Untitled.

She was a guest on BBC Radio 4's Quote... Unquote on 21 September 2015.

In March 2017, her three-part series Sarah Kendall: Australian Trilogy was broadcast on BBC Radio 4. A second series was aired in August 2018.

She has also appeared in Richard Herring's Leicester Square Theatre Podcast in 2021, in which Herring took issue with an article that suggested she met her husband at the Edinburgh fringe, she revealed that they met at a Melbourne Comedy festival. She was also featured in a Georg Jensen commercial.

She appeared in the final episode of the first series of Motherland, originally aired on BBC Two, as a nanny.

In 2019, Kendall created, wrote and starred in the comedy TV series Frayed, renewed in 2021.

Kendall was the winner of Series 11 of the comedy game show Taskmaster.

In 2026, with Diane Morgan, she co-wrote and performed in the BBC One television sitcom Ann Droid.

== Personal life ==
Kendall is gay. She was married to Henry Naylor and has two children.

== Filmography ==
=== Acting ===
Year	Title	Role	Notes
2008	Beehive	Various characters	Sketch series; 5 episodes (also writer)
2010	BBC Nought	Product Designer	1 episode
2017	Motherland	Lindsey	Season 1, Episode 6: "The Caretaker"
2019–	Frayed	Sammy Cooper	Main role; 2 seasons (also writer and producer)
2020	The Other One	Kelly	Season 1, Episodes 2 & 7 (also script editor on 3 episodes)
2024–	Things You Should Have Done	Sarah Gilbeaux	Season 1, Episodes 5 & 6
2026–	Ann Droid	Delivery Driver	Season 1, Episodes 1, 5 and 6

=== Self appearances ===
Year	Title	Notes
1997	Headliners	Unknown episode(s)
2000	Russell Gilbert Live	Season 1, Episode 9
2000–2012	Melbourne International Comedy Festival Gala	5 events
2001	Rove	Season 2, Episode 1
2001	The World Comedy Tour: Melbourne 2001	TV special
2001–2003	The Glass House	3 episodes
2007	The If.comedy Awards: A Comedy Cuts Special	Awards ceremony
2011	Comedy Summit: The World's Ultimate Prankster	TV special
2011	So This Is Christmas!	TV special
2012	The Unbelievable Truth	2 episodes
2013	Tractor Monkeys	2 episodes
2014	Cracker Night	TV gala
2015	Alan Davies: As Yet Untitled	1 episode
2015–2021	Richard Herring's interview podcasts	Leicester Square Theatre Podcast; 3 episodes
2020	Spicks and Specks	1 episode
2021	Taskmaster	10 episodes
2021	Taskmaster: The Podcasts	2 episodes
2021	Question Team	1 episode
2021	Between the Covers	1 episode
2022	Would I Lie to You?	1 episode
2022	Guessable	1 episode

== Awards and nominations ==
Year	Nominee / Work	Award	Result
2021	Frayed	AACTA Awards - Best Comedy Performer	Nominated
2020	Frayed	BAFTA TV Awards - Best Female Comedy Performance	Nominated
2018	Australian Trilogy	Chortle Awards - Best Radio	Nominated
2017	A Day in October (Australian Trilogy)	BBC Audio Drama Awards - Best Scripted Comedy	Won
2017	Australian Trilogy	UK Writer's Guild - Best Scripted Comedy (Radio)	Won
2015	Sarah Kendall	Foster's Edinburgh Comedy Award – Best Comedy Show	Nominated
2014	Touch Down	Melbourne International Comedy Festival Piece of Wood Award	Won
2007	My Very First Kidnapping	ThreeWeeks Editor's Choice Awards	Won
2006	Sarah Kendall	Time Out Comedy Award	Nominated
2004	Sarah Kendall	Perrier Award	Nominated
2003	Sarah Kendall	Herald Angels	Won
