= DND =

DND or Dnd may refer to:

== Arts and entertainment ==
- Dungeons & Dragons, a role-playing game
  - dnd (1975 video game), a role-playing game
  - DND (video game), a role-playing video game, 1977
- "DND" (song), a 2020 song by Polo G
- "Dnd", a song by Ab-Soul from the 2024 album Soul Burger
- "DND", a song by Semisonic from the 1998 album Feeling Strangely Fine

== Businesses and organisations ==
- Department of National Defence (Canada)
- Department of National Defense (Philippines)
- United States District Court for the District of North Dakota
- Da Niang Dumpling, a Chinese fast food restaurant chain
- Dobrovolnaya narodnaya druzhina (Voluntary People's Druzhina), voluntary detachments for maintaining public order in the Soviet Union

== Science and technology ==
- Detonation nanodiamond, a diamond that originates from a detonation
- Drag and drop, an action in computer graphic user interfaces
- D_{nd}, a classification of dihedral symmetry in three dimensions

== Transportation ==
- DND Flyway, the Delhi to Noida road in India
- Dundee Airport (IATA airport code), Scotland

== See also ==
- D&D (disambiguation)
- Do not disturb (disambiguation)
- Do Not Disturb Registry, or National Customer Preference Register
