= Parsons and Naylor's Pull-Out Sections =

- Genre: sketch show
- Running time: 30 mins
- Country of origin: United Kingdom
- Language: English
- Home station: BBC Radio 2
- Starring: Andy Parsons; Henry Naylor; Richie Webb
- Produced by: Gareth Edwards, Katie Tyrell, Carol Smith
- Recording studio: Drill Hall, London; University of London Union; Pleasance, Edinburgh
- Original release: 20 January 2001 – 17 March 2007
- No. of series: 9
- Website: bbc.co.uk/parsonsandnaylor

Parsons and Naylor's Pull-Out Sections is a BBC Radio 2 satirical comedy show starring Andy Parsons and Henry Naylor. It also starred Richie Webb, and one female "special guest".

Female guests included Lucy Porter, Jo Caulfield, Julia Morris, Sarah Kendall, Kitty Flanagan, Nina Conti, Geraldine McNulty and Nina Wadia.

Most shows were recorded at The Drill Hall in London, although some were recorded at the Pleasance during the Edinburgh Festival Fringe. Some of series eight and one show of series nine were recorded at the University of London Union on Malet Street.

Production for the show started on Tuesdays, when the commissioned would meet at Broadcasting House at Portland Place. The show also had an open door policy, allowing non-commissioned writers to submit unsolicited scripts. On recording days, a variety of sketches would be tested in front of the audience and developed for later inclusion in the programme.

A 'best of' compilation album was released in August 2003, and shows were often repeated on BBC7.

== Transmission dates and special guests ==
This table lists the dates of the original Thursday evening BBC Radio 2 transmissions, along with the special guests.

	Week 1	Week 2	Week 3	Week 4	Week 5	Week 6	Week 7	Week 8	Week 9	Week 10
Series 1 (2001)	20 January	27 January	3 February	10 February	17 February	24 February	3 March	10 March		
Series 2 (2001)	28 June	5 July	12 July	19 July	26 July	2 August	9 August^{1}	16 August	23 August	30 August
Series 3 (2002)	18 April	25 April	2 May	9 May	16 May	23 May	30 May	6 June	13 June	
Series 4 (2002)	19 September	26 September	3 October	10 October	17 October	24 October				
Series 5 (2003)	24 July; Jenny Eclair	31 July	7 August^{1} Lucy Porter	14 August^{1} Jo Caulfield	21 August; Kitty Flanagan	28 August; Sarah Kendall	4 September; Nina Conti	11 September; Geraldine McNulty	18 September; Lucy Porter	25 September; Julia Morris
Series 6 (2004)	19 February	26 February	4 March	11 March	18 March	25 March				
Series 7 (2004)	9 September	16 September	23 September; Jo Caulfield	30 September; Nina Conti	7 October; Jackie Clune	14 October; Jenny Eclair				
Series 8 (2005)	14 April^{#} Lucy Porter	21 April; Jackie Clune	28 April; Katherine Jakeways	5 May^{#} (Election Special); Lucy Porter	12 May	19 May	26 May			
Series 9 (2007)	15 Feb; Julia Morris	22 Feb; Lucy Porter	1 Mar; Lucy Porter	8 March; Lucy Porter	17 March^{*} Barunka O'Shaughnessy					

There were also New Year Specials on 3 January 2002 and 27 December 2002, and a Christmas special on 25 December 2003.

- ^Note 1 : Recorded at the Pleasance Theatre during the Edinburgh Fringe.
- ^Note # : Recorded at the University of London Union (Malet Street, London. WC1).
- ^Note * : Not broadcast on the Thursday due to Comic Relief, but was broadcast on the Saturday repeat.

== Subjects ==
Each show is introduced with a short hit on the co-star and 'musical maestro' Richie Webb.

The main subjects would include;

- News
- Society
- Lifestyle
- Culture
- Travel
- Music
- Media
- Sport
- Bigotry
- Football
- Home Affairs
- Bank Holidays
- Living
- Christmas
- Education
- Animals
- Hollywood
- News Review
- Classified
- Fashion

== CD track listing ==
Parsons and Naylor Pull-out Sections

Compilation album by Andy Parsons, Henry Naylor, and others
- Released: 4 August 2003
- Genre: Satire
- Label: BBC Audiobooks
- Producer: Gareth Edwards; Katie Tyrell

=== CD one ===
1. Introduction
2. News Imagine a world - live in the Middle East
3. Bigotry
4. Football
5. Culture In a nutshell - Shakespear Play
6. Home Affairs
7. Society
8. Bank Holidays In a nutshell - Interview with a Royal nutter
9. Music
10. Lifestyle
11. Introduction
12. News
13. Media
14. Living
15. Christmas
16. Education
17. Sport
18. Music
19. Animals

=== CD two ===
1. Introduction
2. News
3. Society
4. Travel
5. Sport
6. Lifestyle
7. Culture
8. Music
9. News Review
10. Introduction
11. News
12. Society
13. Travel
14. Culture
15. Sport
16. Hollywood
17. Lifestyle
18. Music
19. Top 20
20. News Review
