= D&D (disambiguation) =

D&D is Dungeons & Dragons, a fantasy role-playing game.

D&D may also refer to:

- D&D (band), a Japanese girl band
- Denial and deception, a Western framework for analyzing military intelligence techniques
- Distress and Diversion cells, known as D&D, monitoring the aircraft emergency frequency
- D&D London, a British restaurant group
- Daman and Diu, former union territory of India, now part of Dadra and Nagar Haveli and Daman and Diu

== See also ==
- Dungeons & Dragons (disambiguation)
- DnD (disambiguation)
- Drag-and-drop, in computer graphical user interfaces
- Dumb and Dumber (disambiguation)
- D. B. Weiss and David Benioff, writing partners of Game of Thrones
- Dine and dash
- Drakar och Demoner (DoD), a Swedish RPG unrelated to Dungeons & Dragons
- Public intoxication, or drunk and disorderly
