= Henry Naylor =

British comedy writer, director, playwright, and performer

- Born: Henry James Naylor
- Education: Downing College, Cambridge
- Notable work: Spitting Image; Parsons and Naylor's Pull-Out Sections; Headcases
- Spouse: Sarah Kendall (divorced)

Comedy career
- Genre: Satire

Henry James Naylor is a British comedy writer, director and performer. He is also a playwright.

== Early life ==
Naylor read history and history of art at Downing College, Cambridge.

== Career ==
Naylor was head writer for Spitting Image, and has written for many TV and radio programmes, including Alas Smith and Jones, Dead Ringers and Alistair McGowan's Big Impression. His work helped these shows to win numerous awards, including a British Comedy Award and the Sony Gold.

With his comedy partner Andy Parsons, he has performed satirical shows in live venues in Australia and as part of the Edinburgh Fringe. Parsons and Naylor's Pull-Out Sections broadcast its ninth season on BBC Radio 2 during Spring 2007. A compilation CD was released in 2003. The duo also set up London's first comedy sketch club, TBA, at the Gate Theatre (London) in the 1990s, and in the process helped discover many of Britain's leading sketch performers, including Armstrong and Miller, Tony Gardner and The Cheese Shop.

In 2008 he created, directed and executive-produced Headcases, a satirical ITV show very similar to Spitting Image but made with CGI rather than puppets. The show won numerous prestigious TV awards - including the RTS for Design and Innovation, and the C21 Award for Best New Sketch Show at Cannes' Mipcom - and was nominated for Best New Programme in the Broadcast Awards.

On the live circuit, Naylor has been a regular at the Edinburgh Festival, performing, writing and directing numerous sketch shows and plays (15 in total). In 2014 he was awarded one of the Festival's highest accolades, the Fringe First. He was also one of the international acts invited to perform at the Melbourne and Sydney Comedy Festivals.

He played Rowan Atkinson's sidekick Bough in a series of 17 commercials for Barclaycard., and in 1993 appeared in the children's television series Press Gang as the acerbically-drawn host (on roller skates) of a Saturday-morning kids' show alongside a puppet cat.

In 2003 he was in the news for throwing a full English breakfast at David Blaine during his Above the Below stunt on the South Bank of the River Thames in London.

=== Plays ===
Naylor has written and directed award-winning plays for the Edinburgh Fringe, usually playing in The Gilded Balloon Teviot. Finding Bin Laden (2003) was a satire about media representation of the 2003 Invasion of Iraq, which also featured co-producer Sam Maynard's documentary photography.

Hunting Diana, his 2004 Fringe offering, was about conspiracy theories surrounding the death of Diana, Princess of Wales.

In 2007 he directed Sarah Kendall's Fringe show My Very First Kidnapping.

In 2014 he wrote his first drama-tragedy, The Collector, which won one of the leading awards at the Edinburgh Festival, the Fringe First. Set in an Iraqi gaol during the occupation of Iraq in 2003, the play attacked brutality on both sides of the conflict. The show transferred off-London's West End and played a sell-out season at the Arcola Theatre in November 2014 to critical acclaim. In autumn of 2016, the show will be going on an extensive 3-month tour of the UK.

In 2015, he premiered the second part of his Arabian Nightmares - Echoes. Opening at the Gilded Balloon, it won the Spirit of the Fringe Award at Edinburgh. Exploring the surprising parallels between the Jihadi adventurers of today and early Victorian pioneers, the play was a provocative and brutal examination of colonialism, and the resonances of history. Echoes received many highly favourable reviews, including one from The Guardian's lead critic Mark Lawson, who described it as a "hugely impressive play". The play transferred both off-West End and off-Broadway - to the Arcola Theatre in London (November 2015) and the 59e59 Theater in New York (April 2016). Its world tour commenced in early 2016, and at the world's second-largest fringe - Adelaide - the show became one of the most decorated at the festival's history, winning five major fringe awards, including for Best Theatre, Critics' Choice and Pick of the Fringe. Again, it scored five-star reviews. In 2016 Naylor was due to premiere the third instalment of the Arabian Nightmares at the Gilded Balloon - its working title being Angel.

Naylor's latest play, Monstering the Rocketman - a retelling of the legal battle between Elton John and The Sun newspaper in the 1980s - premiered at the Gilded Balloon in Edinburgh in summer 2025 before transferring to London's Arcola Theatre in early 2026.

Cultural offices
Preceded by Roland Kenyon	Footlights President; 1990–1991	Succeeded by Sue Perkins
