= Habib Nasib Nader =

British actor

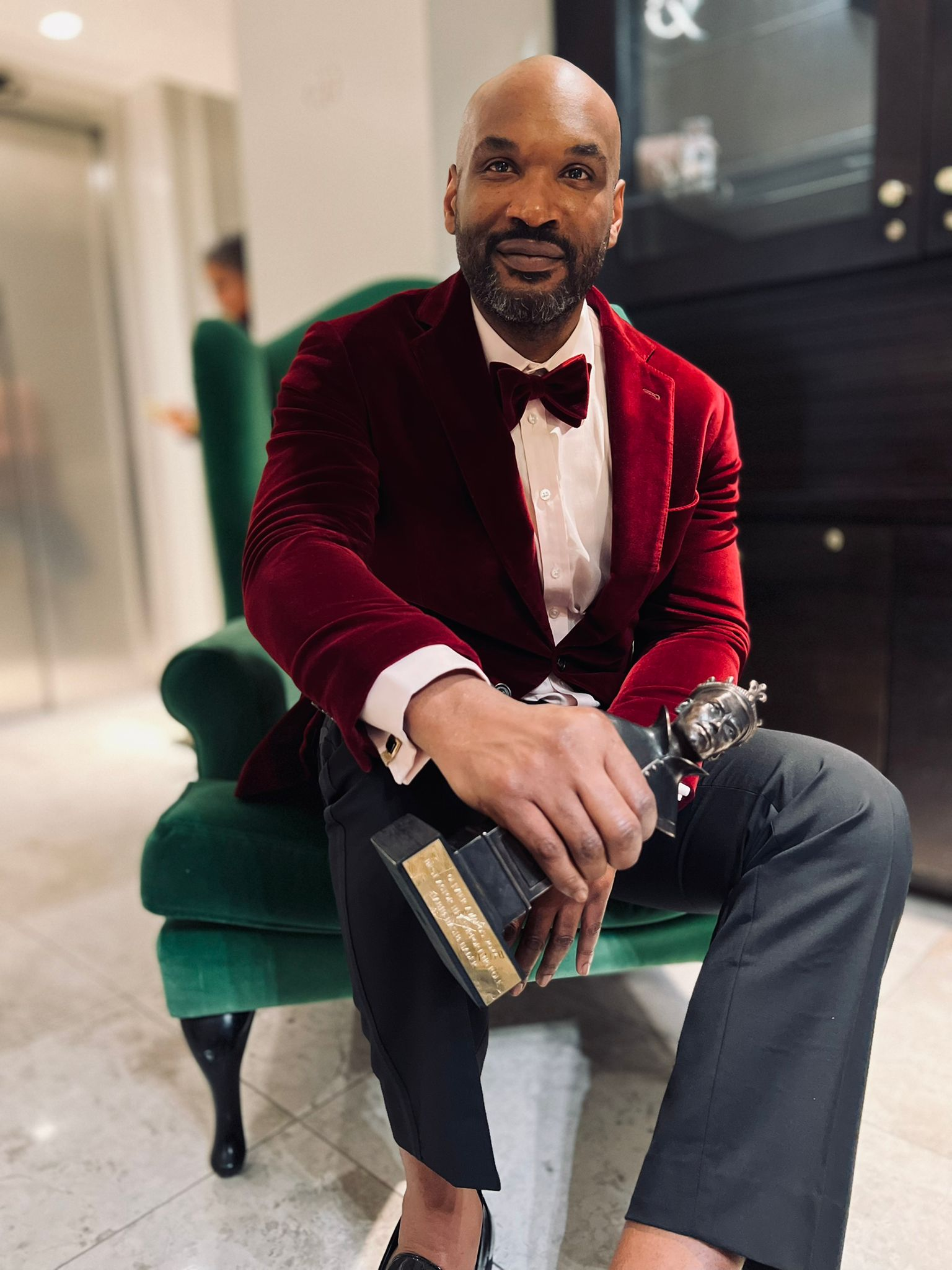
- Born: 1979 (age 46–47); London, England, UK
- Education: London Academy of Music and Dramatic Art (BA)
- Website: Official website

Habib Nasib Nader (born 1979) is a British actor. He is the recipient of a Laurence Olivier Award, having won Best Supporting Actor with a team of six others for operating and voicing the tiger in Life of Pi. They are the first puppeteers to win this award. Nader was in the original cast at the Sheffield Crucible before moving to the Wyndham's Theatre on the West End.

Nader's other theatre credits include The Grouch at the West Yorkshire Playhouse and White Open Spaces in Edinburgh, Soho Theatre and Sweden.

On television, he had a recurring role as Gregory in the BBC comedy Little Britain. He also appeared in the series Judge John Deed, Beehive as well as the film The Golden Compass. He trained at the Academy Drama School and at the London Academy of Music and Dramatic Art.

== Filmography ==
=== Film ===
Year	Title	Role	Notes
2004	The Libertine	Acting Troop	
2005	Revolver	Lily Walkers Security	Uncredited
2007	The Golden Compass	Ragnar	
2015	Under Milk Wood	Black Colossus	
2015	Four Warriors	Dragoolath	

=== Television ===
Year	Title	Role	Notes
	King Lear	Earl of Kent	
2003	Judge John Deed	Adam	BBC
2003	Little Britain	Gregory / Justin	Series 1, 2 & 3
2008	Mistresses	Traffic Light Guy	BBC
2008	Beehive	Josh	BBC
2010	Come Fly With Me	Journalist	BBC
2012	Cuckoo	Security Guard	BBC
2012	Dungeons & Dragons 3: The Book of Vile Darkness	Vimak, a barbarian	
2014	Law & Order: UK	Winklemans Solicitor	
2016	Zapped	Warrior Chief	Baby Cow Productions
2022–present	Heartstopper	Richard Argent	Episode: "Perfect"

== Theatre ==
Year	Title	Role	Notes
2006	White Open Spaces	Graham	
2008	The Grouch	Orville	
2014	Downtown Paradise	James Wilson	
2015	Secret Cinema: Star Wars. The Empire Strikes Back	Various. Darth Vader,	
	The Crystal Maze	Dr Salador/Maze Master	
2019, 2022	Life of Pi	Cook / Voice of Richard Parker / Hyena	Sheffield Crucible / Wyndham's Theatre

== Accolades ==
- Olivier Awards (2022): Best Supporting Actor, Winner as Voice of Richard Parker/ Cook - Life Of Pi
