= Andy Parsons =

English comedian and writer

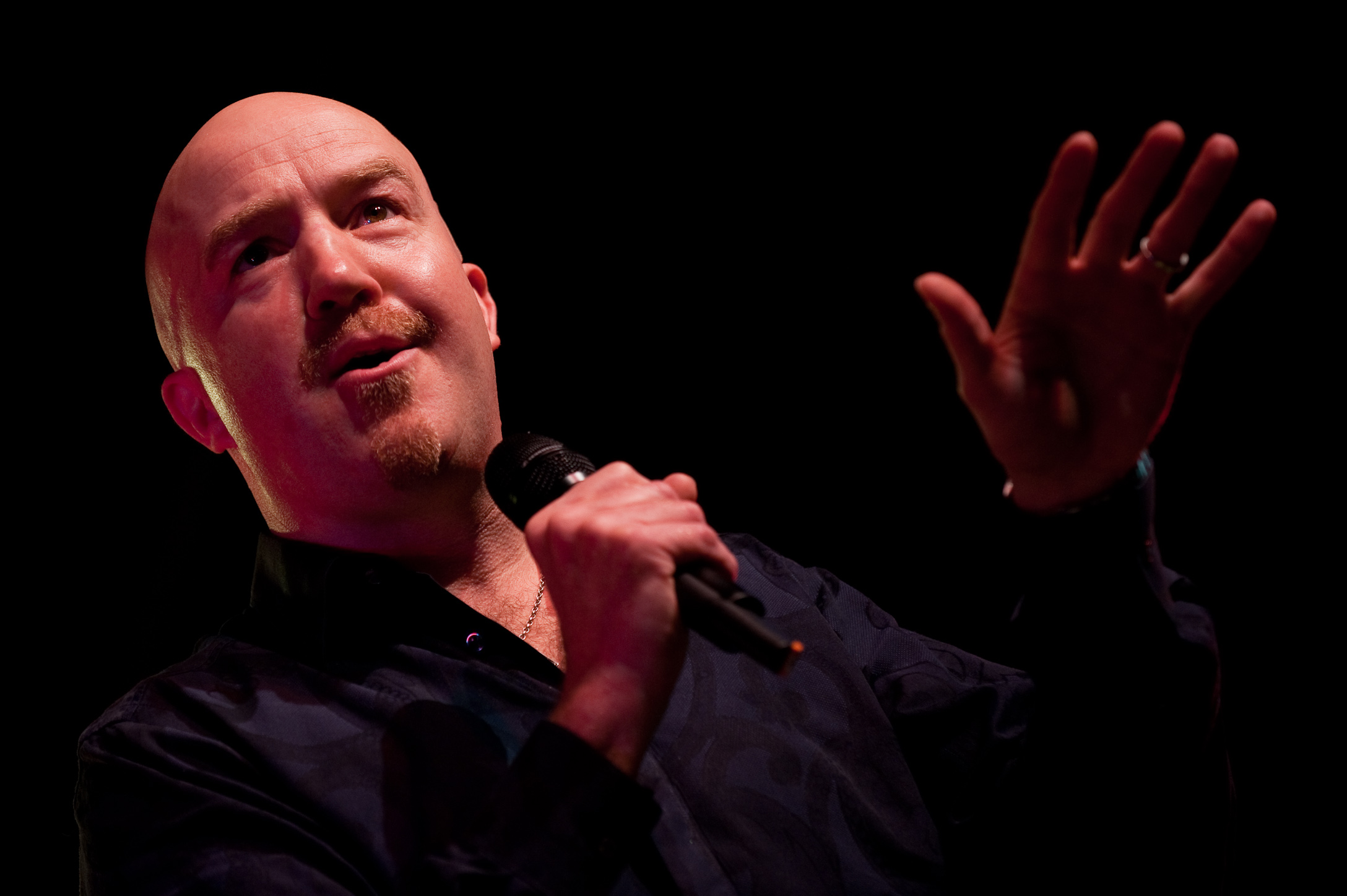
- Parsons at the Glastonbury Festival 2013
- Born: Andrew John Parsons; 1967 (age 58–59); Weymouth, England, UK
- Education: Christ's College, Cambridge (BA)
- Notable work: Parsons and Naylor's Pull-Out Sections (2001–07); Mock the Week (2005–2015)

Comedy career
- Years active: 1992–present
- Medium: Stand-up
- Genre: Satire
- Website: www.andyparsons.co.uk

Andrew John Parsons (born 1967), known professionally as Andy Parsons, is an English comedian and writer. He regularly appeared on Mock the Week from Series 3 to Series 14. With comedy partner Henry Naylor, he wrote and presented nine series of Parsons and Naylor's Pull-Out Sections for BBC Radio 2.

== Early life ==
Parsons was born in Poole, Dorset; his father was a physics teacher who became a head teacher, and his mother was a radiographer. Parsons suffered from breathing difficulties as a child, leading to multiple corrective surgeries. He attended Parc Eglos Primary School, Helston Comprehensive School in Cornwall and Churston Ferrers Grammar School, Torbay (Devon) before going to Christ's College, Cambridge to study Law, where he met and formed a double act with Henry Naylor which twice toured with the National Student Theatre Company and once with the Footlights. After completing his studies, Parsons got a job working as a legal clerk on a case at the Greenock shipyards, which he describes as "the most tedious thing I'd ever done." With Naylor he established TBA, London's first sketch comedy club.

== Writing/television ==
Parsons' first TV writing job was for Spitting Image and he went on to become one of the main writers. He has also appeared as a guest on They Think It's All Over, QI and BBC Radio 5 Live's Fighting Talk. In 1996 he appeared in Asylum, the Paramount Comedy Channel series directed by Edgar Wright, alongside Simon Pegg, Bill Bailey and Julian Barratt. In 2005 he was a guest in an episode of the BBC Radio 2 series Flight of the Conchords. Parsons left Mock the Week in October 2015 after nine series as a regular panelist, missing only five episodes. He, like the other regular panellists on Mock the Week, kept the same seat throughout the series, Parsons being the one on host Dara Ó Briain's left.

He has also presented The PMQ show on BBC Radio 5 Live and was a regular during the 2010 World Cup on the BBC Radio 2 show Never Write Off The Germans.

Parsons also appeared in World's Most Dangerous Roads alongside Ed Byrne, travelling along the Road of Bones in Siberia, visiting the coldest inhabited place on Earth and sleeping in a tent at −53 °C.

After writing for Week Ending, Parsons and Naylor were given their own show Parsons and Naylor's Pull-Out Sections in 2001. The show ran for nine series until 2007. They have also performed live versions of the show at the Edinburgh Festival Fringe (1993–2001) and at international comedy festivals in Sydney (1998/99), Melbourne and Adelaide (both 1998).

== Stand-up comedy ==
Parsons regularly performs solo shows at comedy festivals, and also at The Comedy Store, where he is a member of its Cutting Edge team. In 2002 he received the Time Out Outstanding Achievement Award.

In September 2000 Parsons was making appearances at Up The Creek Comedy Club in Greenwich, often alongside Jimmy Carr.

In 2008, he co-wrote and starred in a BBC Radio 4 sitcom called The Lost Weblog of Scrooby Trevithick and a second series, Scrooby Trevithick, aired in 2010. He toured in the UK with his show Andy Parsons: Citizens! in 2009. The show was recorded at the Lyric Theatre, London on 28 September 2009 and released on DVD in November that year under the title Britain's Got Idiots which was shown on BBC2 in October & December 2010.

In 2010, Parsons took part in Channel 4's Comedy Gala, a benefit show held in aid of Great Ormond Street Children's Hospital, filmed live at the O2 Arena in London on 30 March.

His 2011 UK National Tour was called Gruntled. and his 2013 tour was called I've Got A Shed. His third DVD Slacktivist was released on 25 November 2013 and was televised on BBC Two in December 2014.

His 2015 tour was entitled Live & Unleashed - But Naturally Cautious. Also in 2015 he started the Slacktivist Action Group, a monthly event held at the Soho Theatre featuring MPs, journalists, experts and comedians.

2017 brought the new tour Peak Bullsh*t.

His 2019 tour, called Healing The Nation, ran from September 2019 to March 2020, and then resumed after the Covid pandemic, with new material, in September 2021.

His 2023/2024 UK Tour was called Bafflingly Optimistic; it was recorded as a one-hour special released on ITVX.

== Activism ==
Parsons backed the People's Vote, a campaign group that called for a public vote on the final Brexit deal between the UK and the European Union.

== Stand-up shows ==
Year	Title	Notes
2009	Citizens!	
2011	Gruntled	
2013	I've Got a Shed	
2015	Live and Unleashed - But Naturally Cautious	
2017–18	Peak Bullsh*t	
2019–22	Healing the Nation	
2023–24	Bafflingly Optimistic	
2025–26	Please #@!$ Off to Mars	

=== DVD releases ===
Title	Released	Notes
Britain's Got Idiots Live	23 November 2009	Live at London's Lyric Theatre
Gruntled Live 2011	14 November 2011	Live at London's Shepherd's Bush Empire
Slacktivist Live	25 November 2013	Live at Harrogate's Theatre
Live and Unleashed but Naturally Cautious	27 November 2015	Live at Margate's Theatre Royal
