= Ann Droid =

British comedy television series

- First series poster
- Genre: Sitcom
- Created by: Diane Morgan
- Written by: Diane Morgan; Sarah Kendall
- Directed by: Joseph Roberts
- Starring: Diane Morgan; Sue Johnston; Paul Ready
- Country of origin: United Kingdom
- Original language: English
- No. of series: 1
- No. of episodes: 6

Production
- Executive producers: Shane Allen; Diane Morgan; Seb Barwell; Navi Lamba
- Producer: Pippa Brown
- Cinematography: James Blann
- Editor: Mark Williams
- Running time: 28 minutes
- Production companies: Boffola Pictures; Witchcraft Industries

Original release
- Network: BBC One
- Release: 17 July 2026 – present

Ann Droid is a British sitcom created by Diane Morgan, and written by Morgan and Sarah Kendall, that premiered on BBC One and BBC iPlayer on 17 July 2026. It stars Morgan, Sue Johnston and Paul Ready.

The series proved popular with viewers and critics alike, becoming the BBC's second-biggest new scripted launch of the year. In August 2026, it was announced that the show had been commissioned for a second series.

== Premise ==
The series is set in 2029 and follows Sue, a widow whose husband died 18 months earlier, and her new android assistant robot, Linda. Linda is a "pre-loved" and discontinued AnnDroid Z58/100 Basic Eldercare Robot given to Sue by her son, Michael, who is moving out of the house to try to fix his marriage.

== Cast and characters ==
=== Regular cast ===
- Diane Morgan as Linda, Sue's robot carer
- Sue Johnston as Sue Bevan, an older woman struggling with isolation and boredom
- Paul Ready as Michael Bevan, Sue's lazy and hopeless son
- Margot Leicester as Phyllis, a condescending and patronising acquaintance of Sue's
- Kathryn Hunter as Eileen, Sue's closest friend, who runs a charity shop
- Andrea Valls as Renee, Michael's unfaithful wife

=== Recurring cast ===
- David Hargreaves as Tom, another friend of Sue's who works for Eileen
- Sarah Kendall as Cass, a driver for R3botics, the company that made Linda
- Nicole Sawyerr as Roxy, Tom's robot carer
- Danny John-Jules as Brian, a cab driver
- Rupert Vansittart as Jeffrey, Phyllis' husband, who is infatuated with Linda
- Maximilian Osinski as Chris, Renee's Brazilian jiu-jitsu instructor with whom she had an affair
- Al Roberts as Mark, Michael's boss at the music shop
- Ed Jones as Keith, Michael's robot co-worker
- Matt Barkley as Guy, Tom's second robot carer

Notable guest stars include Leila Hoffman, Rylan Clark, Michelle Greenidge, Souad Faress, Marion Barron, Carla Woodcock and Simon Greenall.

== Episodes ==
No. in series	Directed by	Written by	Original release date	TV broadcast	UK viewers (millions)
1	Joseph Roberts	Sarah Kendall and Diane Morgan	17 July 2026	17 July 2026	4.61
In the near future, advanced humanoid robots have supplanted humans in a variety of roles, including manual labor, sex work, and healthcare, although occasional malfunctions cause some to harm their human owners. Sue is an elderly woman whose husband, David, has recently died, leaving her heartbroken and struggling with the household tasks he once managed. After suffering a fall and breaking her arm, Sue is hospitalised. Her only child, Michael, tells her he is moving out after deciding to reconcile with his estranged wife, Renee, following her affair with her Brazilian jiu-jitsu instructor Chris. Sue disapproves of the reconciliation, believing Renee treated Michael badly. Concerned about leaving Sue alone, Michael buys an outdated care robot, Ann Droid Z58/100 Basic Care Model, to provide companionship and assistance. Sue refuses to accept that she needs support or a robot living in her home. Sue's friend, Eileen, unpacks and activates the Ann Droid, whom Sue names Linda after her much-disliked sister. Sue reluctantly takes Linda with her on errands and gradually adjusts to her eccentric personality before eventually confining her to Michael's room. One night, Sue trips over a pair of heated slippers Linda had suggested she use, striking her head. She later wakes in a hospital to discover that Linda had brought her there for treatment. A nurse tells Sue that Linda's intervention is the only reason she is being discharged home. Calling Michael, Sue breaks down, admitting she misses David and insisting she does not want Linda in her home. Afterwards, she confides in Linda that she fears she has already lost her family and her independence. Linda wishes her well and prepares to be collected the following day. The following day, a R3botics employee arrives to collect Linda, but Sue realises Linda has secretly planted David's memorial rose, which Sue had been unable to plant herself. Moved by the gesture, Sue changes her mind and decides to keep Linda.
2	Joseph Roberts	Sarah Kendall and Diane Morgan	17 July 2026	24 July 2026	4.61
Renee and Michael invite Sue to Renee's Brazilian jiu-jitsu brown belt ceremony, but Sue makes excuses not to attend. Learning that her friend, Eileen, is going to a birthday party and her colleague is off sick, Sue offers to manage the charity shop in Eileen's absence. Sue's frenemy, Phyllis, visits the shop to donate several items, including a gun-shaped lighter, while her husband, Jeffrey, becomes enamoured with Linda. Things quickly go awry when Sue and Linda leave to collect a delivery and the shop door locks behind them. Sue attempts to use Linda to break in through the rear of the shop, but only succeeds in breaking a drainpipe and a window. By the time they return to the front entrance, the delivery has been stolen. Eileen reopens the shop but refuses to let Sue work there again. Inspired by Eileen's visit to an infirm family member, Sue decides to attend Renee's ceremony to support Michael. Meanwhile, Michael struggles after learning that Renee is still training with Chris despite their affair, which she blames on Michael's inattentiveness while he cared for his mother following his father's death. His distracted behaviour and recent absences due to his declining mental health following the breakdown of his marriage earn the ire of his boss, who reduces his shifts. At Renee's ceremony, Michael is jealous as he watches Renee and the unapologetic Chris training together. Michael is goaded into sparring with Chris, who traps him in a painful hold. Sue arrives and orders Linda to intervene. Linda produces the gun-shaped lighter, causing the attendees to flee, before incapacitating Chris with a taser when he charges at her.
3	Joseph Roberts	Sarah Kendall and Diane Morgan	17 July 2026	31 July 2026	5.05
Michael signs up for an open mic night to pursue his passion for performing and tasks Linda with composing an original song for him to perform. At work, he discovers that his new co-worker, Keith, is a robot who is significantly more capable and knowledgeable than he is. Hoping to broaden Sue's horizons, Linda and Eileen persuade her to join them, Eileen's colleague Tom, and his robot, Roxy, on a trip to the seaside to scatter Tom's cousin's ashes. Afterwards, Sue and Linda visit a funfair and consult a psychic, who claims that David says Sue will find the earring he gave her in the last place she looks and encourages her to try new experiences. Sue agrees to ride a roller coaster with Linda, Tom, and Roxy, but Roxy falls from the ride and is destroyed. Meanwhile, after complaining that robots are taking opportunities away from humans, Michael performs the "original" song Linda provided, unaware that it is actually Daniel Powter's Bad Day, humiliating himself before the audience. Keith then performs the same song to an enthusiastic reception. Back home, Linda admires a photograph of herself and Sue taken on the roller coaster. She suggests that Tom could simply buy another Roxy, but Sue explains that humans often become emotionally attached to people and possessions. Later, while getting ready for bed, Sue finds the missing earring David gave her.
4	Joseph Roberts	Sarah Kendall and Diane Morgan	17 July 2026	7 August 2026	5.10
Sue prepares to host Renee and Michael for dinner. While shopping, Sue and Linda encounter Phyllis, who reveals it is her birthday and that she believes her family is planning a surprise party for her. She invites Sue to attend. Meanwhile, Michael is fired from the music store but conceals the truth from Renee, who insists they have sex in a lay-by in an attempt to conceive. Phyllis discovers that her family has forgotten her birthday and that Jeffrey is leaving her for a robot. During dinner, Renee and Michael tell Sue they are trying to have a baby and ask her to remortgage her home to provide the down payment for a new flat. When Renee chokes on her food, Linda saves her life and determines that she is already pregnant, much to Sue's dismay. Following Linda's warning about the financial risks of losing her home and income, Sue refuses to remortgage the property, prompting Renee and Michael to leave angrily. Later, a drunken Phyllis arrives at Sue's home and reveals that her family forgot her birthday and that none of the people she invited came to celebrate. The pair bond over their shared disappointments and drink together before Sue, against Linda's advice, tells Michael that she will sell her home to provide the down payment.
5	Joseph Roberts	Sarah Kendall and Diane Morgan	17 July 2026	14 August 2026	5.26
Linda and Sue go on a camping trip to watch a meteor shower, recreating holidays Sue once shared with David. Sue encourages Linda to befriend a boy named Max, but Linda instead tells the children a frightening "story" about the world ending because of humanity's actions. Seeking some privacy, Sue and Linda head into the forest, where they discover an old carving of a caterpillar that David made. Sue photographs it and sends the image to Michael. Soon afterwards, Sue and Linda become lost. Meanwhile, Michael refuses to speak to Sue after she changes her mind about remortgaging her home once she sobers up. Desperate for money, he attempts to join another medical trial but is rejected because it concerns fertility. He is informed that his previous trial was terminated after researchers discovered it rendered participants infertile. A fertility test reveals that Michael has a low sperm count, leading him to realise he cannot be the father of Renee's baby. After receiving Sue's photograph, he tracks down Sue and Linda, telling Sue that he intends to divorce Renee. Back at the campsite, Michael helps pitch their tent while Sue takes Linda to apologise to Max. Recalling a game she saw other children playing earlier, Linda gives Max a hallucinogenic chocolate she had been given, unaware of what it actually is. As Sue, Linda, and Michael watch the meteor shower, Linda promises to think of Sue when the next one arrives in several decades—unless she has a new owner, in which case she will not remember her.
6	Joseph Roberts	Sarah Kendall and Diane Morgan	17 July 2026	21 August 2026	5.58
Michael has moved back in with Sue and tells Renee that they should divorce. Chris has moved in with Renee after his own wife divorced him for getting Renee pregnant and is taking over his businesses. Renee confesses that Chris is far less enjoyable to live with than he was to have an affair with. Meanwhile, Linda keeps Sue occupied with dance classes and other activities. Michael later breaks the news to Sue that he cannot afford to keep Linda. When the R3botics truck arrives to collect Linda, Sue gives her the photograph of the pair on the rollercoaster to remember her by. The truck driver tells Michael that Linda's model is obsolete, so she will instead be dismantled for scrap. After Linda is taken away, Sue discovers the care instructions Linda left for her and realises the activities had been intended to distract her from her and David's wedding anniversary. The R3botics truck stops to pick up Melody, the intercourse robot bought by Jeffrey, who is returning her because she is too intelligent. Melody reveals to Linda that all of the robots are being taken to be dismantled. During Sue's dinner party, Phyllis admits, to Sue's shock, that she intends to take Jeffrey back because she fears being alone. Michael returns from a date after being rejected because he does not resemble his heavily edited profile photos. He interrupts the dinner, behaves rudely, and tells Sue that he preferred the way she used to cook chicken, but Sue rejects the notion that the old ways are always better. Retreating to her room, she discovers Linda's farewell gift: a recording made in David's voice wishing her a happy anniversary and praising her strength. Believing Sue has been deceived into thinking Linda is being repurposed rather than destroyed, Linda escapes the transport van with Melody to return to Sue. Meanwhile, Sue goes in search of Linda, accidentally striking her with her car before reversing over Melody, leaving her broken in half. Melody immediately begins flirting with Michael, while Sue brings Linda inside, promising they will find a way to afford keeping her and that they still have many more memories to make together.

== Production ==
The series is written by Sarah Kendall and Diane Morgan, with Morgan also taking the lead role as humanoid robot Linda, and Kendall playing the delivery driver Cass. It is produced by Boffola Pictures and Witchcraft Industries. Shane Allen is executive producer with Morgan and Pippa Brown, who is also series producer. Joseph Roberts directed the series.

Filming on the series had commenced by October 2025. Filming locations included Hemel Hempstead and Southend-on-Sea. The series debuted on BBC One and BBC iPlayer on 17 July 2026.

On 27 August 2026, the BBC announced that a second series had been commissioned.

== Reception ==
The series proved popular with viewers and critics alike. Daily Mirror called it "a grief comedy". Jen Pharo wrote: "Diane [Morgan] was inspired to write the series after reading about robot carers in Japan and also by her own mum. ... Ann Droid has lots of laughs and lots of heart."

Rachel Aroesti of The Guardian wrote: "Ann Droid is worth raving about on its own terms – it’s rambunctiously funny and exceptionally poignant ... I cried at least once per episode. ... In less capable hands, Ann Droid’s dramatic arc could have been a tough sell. Set a handful of years into the future, it sees many frightening predictions around AI come true: robots are decimating the job market, and Sue’s son Michael ... is eventually made redundant by a machine. Yet he’s so lazy, selfish and useless it’s hard to feel sorry for him. This is a world where robots are loyal and egoless, while the humans (Sue aside) are crushing disappointments."

Hannah J Davies, also of The Guardian, awarded the programme five stars out of five, describing it as "wonderfully fresh and funny" and "shot through with love and care." Writing for the Radio Times, James Hibbs called the series "pleasingly retro" and particularly highlighted Morgan's performance as a "comedic masterclass", giving the show three stars out of five.

The first episode of the first series garnered 7.6 million viewers in 28 days. This made it second biggest new scripted launch of the year for the BBC to date, after Mackenzie Crook's comedy drama Small Prophets.
