= PlayStation: The Official Magazine =

Defunct magazine in the United States

- The first issue of PTOM
- Editor-in-chief: Roger Burchill
- Categories: Gaming
- Frequency: 13 issues a year
- Publisher: Future plc / Future US
- First issue: September 1997 (PSM); December 2007 (PlayStation: The Official Magazine)
- Final issue: December 25, 2012
- Country: United States
- Based in: South San Francisco, California
- Language: English
- ISSN: 1940-0721

PlayStation: The Official Magazine (PTOM) was a magazine originally known as PlayStation Magazine (PSM), becoming PlayStation: The Official Magazine in late 2007. PlayStation: The Official Magazine was published 13 times a year by Future plc until its cancellation in late 2012.

PSM's UK-based partner magazine, PSM3, was another Future publication.

== History ==
=== PSM: 100% Independent PlayStation Magazine ===
The first issue of PSM

A cover near the end of the magazine's run as PSM

Prior to becoming the official magazine, PSM was an independently published video game magazine specializing in all Sony PlayStation-brand video game consoles and handheld gaming platforms. PSM was published by Future, who also publishes PlayStation Official Magazine in United Kingdom.

The magazine launched with the September 1997 issue, which featured Final Fantasy VII on the cover. During its publication, it consistently outsold every other PlayStation-dedicated magazine both in the United States and abroad (according to independent ABC audits).

PSM celebrated ten years of publication with its 2007 issue. By this time, the magazine had been through several redesigns, most recently with its June 2006 issue. Also over its history, the magazine had sponsored side content such as cover-mounted DVDs, websites, online forums, and near the end, a PSM podcast.

=== PlayStation: The Official Magazine ===
After Official U.S. PlayStation Magazine was discontinued, Sony Computer Entertainment announced on October 1, 2007, that PSM would become PlayStation: The Official Magazine.

The last issue published under the PSM title was that of December 2007, becoming PlayStation: The Official Magazine with the following Christmas 2007 issue. While it did retain the same staff for a period of time lasting from December 2007 until January 2008, it eventually lost its remaining core editors, making PTOM a completely different magazine from the former PSM.

Due to the same setbacks that caused the cancelations of other video game magazines published by Future (mostly prominently Nintendo Power), the magazine ceased publication after 15 years (5 as PlayStation: The Official Magazine) with its Christmas 2012 issue.

== Mascots and promotion ==
Banzai Chibi-Chan was something of a mascot during the first few years of PSM.

In the beginning, PSM had an anime-style mascot named "Banzai Chibi-Chan", created and illustrated by Robert DeJesus. He was featured prominently in early issues and even inspired apparel and other accessories. He was later dropped, with the supposed reason being that the character was too childish and gave some the wrong impression about the magazine's intended audience.

A smiley face featuring an eye patch with a star on it was also used, but it too was eventually dropped after the magazine went through redesign in later years. The PSM Smiley Face was notable for its appearance throughout the magazine, as well as on "lid-sticker" inserts (large, circular stickers that could be placed decoratively on the lid of a PlayStation console), including one found in the first issue.

Some lid-stickers promotionally featured characters from PlayStation games being covered in the magazine. Other inserts included PlayStation memory card label stickers featuring visual themes similar to the lid-stickers, as well as video game tip sheets, instead of the demo discs that then-competitor Official U.S. PlayStation Magazine was known for.

As PTOM, from the July 2008 issue to the June 2009 issue, the magazine included promotional codes for free downloads of Qore, a subscription-based interactive online magazine for the PlayStation 3, available through the PlayStation Store. These free, promotional editions of Qore did not include some of the features available in the paid-for edition, such as playable demos. PTOM also had promotional pullout-style posters from time to time, to help advertise upcoming video game releases.
