= Dungeons & Dragons: Wrath of the Dragon God =

2005 fantasy film directed by Gerry Lively

- DVD cover
- Based on: Dungeons & Dragons by Wizards of the Coast
- Written by: Brian Rudnick; Robert Kimmel
- Directed by: Gerry Lively
- Starring: Mark Dymond; Clemency Burton-Hill; Bruce Payne
- Music by: David Julyan
- Country of origin: United States
- Original language: English

Production
- Producers: Steve Richards; Steve Clark-Hall; Wolfgang Esenwein
- Cinematography: Igor Meglic
- Editor: Rodney Holland
- Running time: 105 minutes
- Production companies: Studio Hamburg Worldwide Pictures; Zinc Entertainment; Sweetpea Ltd.
- Budget: $12 million

Original release
- Network: Sci-Fi Channel
- Release: October 8, 2005

Dungeons & Dragons: Wrath of the Dragon God (also known as Dungeons & Dragons: The Elemental Might in some markets) is a 2005 direct-to-video American fantasy adventure film directed by Gerry Lively and written by Brian Rudnick and Robert Kimmel. The second instalment in the Dungeons & Dragons film series, it serves as a stand-alone sequel to Dungeons & Dragons (2000), which in turn was based on role-playing game of the same name. The only returning actor is Bruce Payne, reprising his role as Damodar.

The film premiered at the Sci-Fi Channel on October 10, 2005. It was released in theaters in Europe as well as some parts of North America and Latin America, and released on DVD on February 7, 2006.

Dungeons & Dragons: Wrath of the Dragon God was followed by Dungeons & Dragons 3: The Book of Vile Darkness, released direct-to-DVD in the United Kingdom on August 9, 2012.

== Plot ==
One hundred years after being defeated by Ridley Freeborn and being cursed by his former master Profion to walk the earth as an undead entity, (Note: As depicted in the first film.) Damodar is revived. Driven insane by the curse, he seeks revenge against the kingdom of Izmir and the descendants of those who defeated him.

After years of searching with the aid of two dark-talon lizardfolk shamans, he locates the Orb of Faluzure, an ancient artifact linked to the power of Faluzure, a dragon god imprisoned under Saragasso's mountains. With the Orb's power, he heals the curse and prepares to awaken the dragon to destroy Izmir.

Fighter Lord Berek, a former captain of the king's guard, and his wife Melora, a young mage, investigate reports of poison gas emanating from Saragasso's caves and find the still-slumbering dragon. Researching the threat in Izmir's library, Melora reports to Oberon, the head of the Mages' Council, that Faluzure was imprisoned three thousand years before by the Turanians, an ancient civilization who also created the Orb. While trying to locate the Orb through magic, Melora is cursed by Damodar and begins dying slowly.

She hides her illness from Berek, who is appointed by the King to assemble a party of adventurers to infiltrate Damodar's lair: barbarian Lux; Dorian, a Cleric of Obad-Hai; elven wizard Ormaline; and master thief Nim. They resolve to locate the vault of the warlock Malek, a worshiper of the demon Juiblex who was gifted the Pool of Sight, a magical scrying pool; the pool might allow them to penetrate Damodar's defenses and reveal the orb's location.

The party sets out to locate Malek's Vault, while Oberon and the other mages try to decipher the tomes of Turanian magic in their library, to find a way to defeat Faluzure. While traveling through a haunted forest, Berek's party catches the attention of Klaxx the Maligned, a lich who offers his services to Damodar. Damodar does not trust him, but thinks that the Orb makes him more powerful than Klaxx. After confronting a white dragon, and losing Dorian in the fight, Berek's party finds the pool, securing their way to Damodar's castle. Confronting him, Berek steal the Orb, though Ormaline and Nim are badly wounded before the wizard teleports them to the Temple of Obad-Hai. While the clerics treat Ormaline and Nim, Berek returns to Izmir, Lux staying behind to delay demons summoned by Damodar.

Using his shape-changing abilities, Klaxx infiltrates Izmir's castle, kills Oberon, and assumes his shape. When Berek returns with the Orb, Melora uses it to unlock a vault discovered beneath the castle, where the Turanians hid the secrets of their magic. Klaxx reveals himself, stealing the Orb back and killing the King and many others before returning the Orb to Damodar. Faluzure awakens and destroys the Orb, regaining his godly power. Damodar asks Faluzure to witness the city's destruction and to let him rule over its remains as Faluzure's servant; Faluzure agrees, but demands tribute in the form of 100 human sacrifices for every new moon in honor of his release. Damodar agrees to this.

While Berek rides in pursuit, Melora, who is near death, deciphers the Turanians' secrets and gains the blessing of Obad-Hai, who gifts her a new Orb. Berek and Lux meet up and confront Damodar, who no longer has the Orb's power. They force him to cancel Melora's curse and she rallies the remaining mages in a magical attack that defeats Faluzure, sealing him away once more. Klaxx, who has no interest in helping Damodar, disappears with a laugh. Izmir is later rebuilt, Berek becomes immersed in his ministerial duties, and Melora is appointed as the new head of the Council of Mages. Lux fully recovers from their wounds. Nim and Ormaline are approached by Dorian, it is implied that both have died and gone to the outer planes. Damodar is imprisoned in a dungeon beneath Izmir, but smiles to himself, fully prepared to wait another hundred years to have his revenge.

== Cast ==
- Bruce Payne as Damodar
- Mark Dymond as Berek
- Clemency Burton-Hill as Melora
- Ellie Chidzey as Lux
- Tim Stern as Nim
- Steven Elder as Dorian
- Lucy Gaskell as Ormaline
- Roy Marsden as Oberon
- Geoffrey T. Bersey as Galtar
- Leonas Ciunis as Old Mage
- Liubomiras Laucevičius as Mage #1
- Ervinas Peteraitis as Mage #2
- Vytautas Rumšas as Valerious
- David Merheb as Tibio
- Aurimas Meliešius as Klaxx
- Laurynas Jurgelis as Magmin
- Andrius Žebrauskas as Pico
- Artūras Orlauskas as Dandy
- Leonardas Pobedonoscevas as Barnaby
- Tauras Cižas as Warrior
- Tomas Vaitkus as Oarsman
- Artūras Builovas as Wicked Doctor
- Mykolas Dorofėjus as Priest
- Ramūnas Abukevičius as Priest of Obadhai
- Evaldas Leskauskas as Lizard Shaman #1
- Tomas Žaibus as Lizard Shaman #2
- Alex Schock as Lizard Shaman #3

== Reception ==
IGN scored it 3 out of 10, stating that only hardcore D&D fans should check it out, though mostly due to references to the game itself. Monsters and Critics awarded it 2 out of 5, stating, "If The Lord of the Rings showed us how the fantasy genre can be done right, Dungeons & Dragons: Wrath of the Dragon God shows us how it can be done horribly wrong." One reviewer stated that Bruce Payne's 'performance is still the highlight of this one'. Another reviewer stated that Bruce Payne 'steals the show.'

== Sequel ==
A sequel, Dungeons & Dragons 3: The Book of Vile Darkness, was announced in 2011, and was released Direct-to-DVD in the United Kingdom on August 29, 2012.
