= Dungeons & Dragons (film series) =

Film series

- Official film franchise logo, as released by Paramount Pictures in 2022.
- Based on: Dungeons & Dragons by Wizards of the Coast
- Distributed by: New Line Cinema (1); Warner Home Video (2); IM Global (3); Paramount Pictures (reboot)
- Country: United States
- Language: English

Dungeons & Dragons is an action-adventure fantasy film series based on the role-playing game of the same name currently owned by Wizards of the Coast. The original trilogy consists of a theatrical film, a made-for-TV second installment, and a direct-to-video third installment, while the fourth installment is a reboot of the series.

== Films ==
Film	U.S. release date	Director(s)	Screenwriter(s)	Story by	Producers
Original trilogy
Dungeons & Dragons	December 8, 2000	Courtney Solomon	Carroll Cartwright and Topper Lilien	Carroll Cartwright and Topper Lilien	Thomas M. Hammel, Kia Jam, Steve Richards and Courtney Solomon
Dungeons & Dragons: Wrath of the Dragon God	October 8, 2005	Gerry Lively	Robert Kimmel and Brian Rudnick	Robert Kimmel and Brian Rudnick	Courtney Solomon
Dungeons & Dragons 3: The Book of Vile Darkness	August 9, 2012	Gerry Lively	Brian Rudnick	Brian Rudnick	Steve Richards
Reboot
Dungeons & Dragons: Honor Among Thieves	March 31, 2023	John Francis Daley and Jonathan Goldstein	John Francis Daley, Jonathan Goldstein and Michael Gilio	Chris McKay and Michael Gilio	Jeremy Latcham, Brian Goldner and Nick Meyer

=== Original trilogy ===
==== Dungeons & Dragons (2000) ====
The Empire of Izmir is a divided land. An elite group of sorcerers, known as "The Mages", rule the land while the commoners are left defenseless. The Empress of Izmir, Savina, fights for equality and prosperity amongst all citizens, but the wicked and powerful Mage Profion plots to overtake her throne. As he plots to rule the Empire by nefarious means, the Empress seeks the Rod of Savrille, which has the power to control the Red Dragons. She hires two petty thieves, Ridley and Snails, who become her key to aligning with the dragonkeeper. Together with a mage apprentice named Marina, a combative Dwarf named Elwood, and the Empire's personal expert tracker - an Elf named Norda - they must outpace Profion's chief henchman Damodar to find the Rod of Savrille, the artifact that has the power to set their kingdom free.

The first film in the series, Dungeons & Dragons was released on December 8, 2000.

==== Dungeons & Dragons: Wrath of the Dragon God (2005) ====
When the evil sorcerer Damodar succeeds in stealing the mystic elemental black orb, he declares a sinister vengeance against the kingdom of Izmir. A decorated warrior of the Empire, named Berek, and Melora, an unseasoned sorceress join forces with four heroes - representing Intelligence, Wisdom, Honor and Strength - to thwart the evil Mage and his growing army. Together they must reach the vault that holds the orb, assembling their own army, and defeat Damadar before he awakens the dormant black dragon whose purpose would destroy the entire kingdom.

Wrath of the Dragon God is the second instalment in the series and serves as a stand-alone sequel to Dungeons & Dragons (2000). The only returning actor is Bruce Payne, reprising his role as Damodar. The film premiered at the Sci-Fi Channel on October 10, 2005. It was released in theaters in Europe as well as some parts of North America and Latin America, and released on DVD on February 7, 2006.

==== Dungeons & Dragons 3: The Book of Vile Darkness (2012) ====
A young knight named Grayson recruits the team to save his father from evil warlord Shantrax, who also wants to use the magical Book of Vile Darkness for malevolent purposes.

The Book of Vile Darkness is the third installment in the series and was released direct-to-DVD in the United Kingdom on August 9, 2012.

=== Reboot ===
==== Dungeons & Dragons: Honor Among Thieves (2023) ====
A bard named Edgin Darvis and barbarian Holga Kilgore enlist a team of unlikely heroes to steal an ancient and powerful relic but come into conflict with evil forces.

Honor Among Thieves is a reboot of the series and has no relation to the previous films. The film was released on March 31, 2023, by Paramount Pictures, and stars Chris Pine, Michelle Rodriguez, Hugh Grant, Justice Smith, Regé-Jean Page, Daisy Head, and Sophia Lillis in the main roles.

== Television ==
A spin-off television series has been in development since 2022. Part of a "multi-pronged approach" for television projects, the show is described as the "flagship" and "cornerstone" live-action series, of the multiple projects in development, while also functioning to "complement" the film side of the franchise. Various networks and streaming companies were reportedly bidding on distribution rights. Paramount+ initially ordered the series and partnered with Entertainment One (eOne) and Paramount Pictures to develop it, but in 2024, the network decided not to go forward with the project. The series is currently in development "by Hasbro's in-house division Hasbro Entertainment following eOne's December 2023 sale to Lionsgate" with a new creative team and "will undergo a creative update before being taken out to other potential buyers".

== Additional crew and production details ==
Crew/Detail
Crew/Detail	Dungeons & Dragons	Dungeons & Dragons: Wrath of the Dragon God	Dungeons & Dragons 3: The Book of Vile Darkness	Dungeons & Dragons: Honor Among Thieves
Crew/Detail	2000	2005	2012	2023
Composer	Justin Caine Burnett	David Julyan	Andy Grush & Taylor Newton Stewart	Lorne Balfe
Cinematographer	Douglas Milsome	Igor Meglic	Emil Topuzov	Barry Peterson
Editor(s)	Caroline Ross	Rodney Holland	Rebecca Weigold Stocker	Dan Lebental
Production companies	Behavior Worldwide, Silver Pictures, Sweetpea Entertainment	Studio Hamburg, Worldwide Pictures, Zinc Entertainment, Sweetpea Ltd.	Zinc Entertainment, After Dark Films	Entertainment One, Sweetpea Entertainment
Distributor	New Line Cinema	Warner Home Video	IM Global	Paramount Pictures
Release date	December 8, 2000	October 8, 2005	August 9, 2012	March 31, 2023
Running time	108 minutes	105 minutes	86 minutes	134 minutes

== In other media ==
Wizards of the Coast released a Fast-Play Game, The Sewers of Sumdall, based on the first film. It is a DVD-ROM feature on the DVD as a printable PDF file.
