= All Saints Eve (film) =

- Directed by: Gerry Lively
- Written by: Elizabeth Rossi
- Starring: Marc Macaulay; Bingo O'Malley; Mere Davis; Katrina Darrell; Nicole Alexandra Shipley; Matthew Bonacci; Shawn Shelpman
- Cinematography: Jack Garrett
- Edited by: Bruce Koehler
- Distributed by: TomCat Films (worldwide); WildEye Releasing (U.S.)
- Release date: February 17, 2015 (DVD)
- Running time: 82 minutes
- Country: United States
- Language: English

All Saints Eve is a horror film directed by Gerry Lively. The film stars Sean Whalen, Marc Macaulay, Katrina Darrell and Bingo O'Malley. It also stars Nick LaMantia and Mere Davis. Filming took place near Pittsburgh, Pennsylvania. The film's writer and producer was Elizabeth Rossi.

== Premise ==
An old curse came about as a result of a murder that took place in the 19th century over a land dispute. A preacher leading mob of angry parishioners murdered a farmer and his family. Now in the present time, there are a group of friends who have to stay alive in order to discover what has caused the curse. They must do this before they themselves fall victim.

== Review ==
The film received a mixed review from Horror Society, praising the cast but noting poor post-production value. It received a score of 6.5 out of 10.
