= The Personality Test =

- Running time: 30 mins
- Country of origin: United Kingdom
- Language: English
- Home station: BBC Radio 4
- Starring: Sue Perkins, Lucy Porter, Robin Ince
- Created by: Aled Evans
- Written by: Richard Turner, Simon Littlefield
- Produced by: Aled Evans
- Original release: 12 July 2006 – 9 August 2007
- No. of series: 3
- No. of episodes: 16

The Personality Test is a British radio comedy broadcast on BBC Radio 4, which sees a weekly guest host present a series of questions about themselves to a panel consisting of comedians.

Along with regulars Sue Perkins, Lucy Porter and Robin Ince, panellists (previous and current) have included Will Smith, Alan Carr, Mark Dolan, Natalie Haynes, and Dan Tetsell.

== Episodes (and Guest Hosts) ==
Source: BBC.

- 01-01 – 2006-07-12 – John Sergeant
- 01-02 – 2006-07-19 – Greg Dyke
- 01-03 – 2006-07-26 – Gyles Brandreth
- 01-04 – 2006-08-02 – Jennie Bond
- 02-01 – 2006-12-07 – Roy Hattersley
- 02-02 – 2006-12-14 – Rick Wakeman
- 02-03 – 2006-12-21 – Adam Hart-Davis
- 02-04 – 2006-12-28 – Antony Worrall Thompson
- 02-05 – 2007-01-04 – Claire Rayner
- 02-06 – 2007-01-11 – Esther Rantzen
- 03-01 – 2007-07-05 – Janet Street-Porter
- 03-02 – 2007-07-12 – Lorraine Kelly
- 03-03 – 2007-07-19 – Andrew Neil
- 03-04 – 2007-07-26 – Edwina Currie
- 03-05 – 2007-08-02 – Toyah Willcox
- 03-06 – 2007-08-09 – Eve Pollard
