= Blood Ranch =

- Directed by: Corbin Timbrook
- Written by: Antonio Hernandez; Corbin Timbrook
- Produced by: Corbin Timbrook
- Starring: Jim Fitzpatrick; Dayton Knoll; Scott L. Schwartz; Season Hamilton
- Release date: 2006
- Country: United States
- Language: English

Blood Ranch is 2006 American horror film directed by Corbin Timbrook and starring Jim Fitzpatrick, Dayton Knoll, Scott L. Schwartz, and Season Hamilton.

== Premise ==
Four college students and an Iraq War veteran encounter a young woman lost in the desert with a black van chasing her. They survive the chase yet their car breaks down and are forced to seek shelter at a mysterious ranch.
