= Marc Macaulay =

American actor

- Born: October 13, 1957 (age 68); Millinocket, Maine, U.S.
- Years active: 1985–present
- Website: marcmacaulay.com

Marc Macaulay (born October 13, 1957) is an American actor.

== Early life and career ==
He was born and raised in Millinocket, Maine. He graduated with a BFA in theater. He appeared in the USA Network Series Burn Notice for five episodes as Agent Harris, and as "Blaine Bauer" in the horror film Thirteen Floors. Some of his most prominent film roles have included Monster, Premonition, Palmetto, Passenger 57, and The Hawk is Dying. In television, he has had guest appearances on Miami Vice, seaQuest DSV, and he played the role of Agent Ives on the television series Prison Break. He also appeared in the episode of Robert Dirscherl in Unsolved Mysteries playing an agent.

== Selected filmography ==
- 1985-1989: Miami Vice (TV Series) as Brookings
- 1988: Grave Robbers as Salesman
- 1989-1991: The Adventures of Superboy (TV Series)
- 1989: No Retreat, No Surrender 3: Blood Brothers as Terrorist
- 1990: Cop Target
- 1990: Edward Scissorhands as Reporter #1
- 1992: Dead Boyz Can't Fly as O'Brien
- 1992: Passenger 57 as Vincent
- 1993: Matinee as Shopping Cart Crook
- 1993: Cop and a Half as Waldo
- 1993: The Real McCoy as Karl
- 1993: Hidden Fears as Marty Vanbeeber
- 1994: China Moon as CSU Technician
- 1994: Tollbooth as Cop #2
- 1994-1995: Matlock (TV Series) as Detective Bob Garrison
- 1994-1995: seaQuest DSV (TV Series) as Colonel Manheim
- 1995: Bad Boys as Noah Trafficante
- 1995: The Perez Family as Male volunteer
- 1995: Fair Game as Navigator
- 1995: Point of Betrayal as Ted's Attorney
- 1995: Smoke n Lightnin as Jones
- 1996: Up Close & Personal as Police Spokesman
- 1996: Shootfighter II as Malo
- 1996: Blood and Wine as Guard
- 1997: Rosewood as Bobby
- 1997: Contact as NASA Technician
- 1997: Catherine's Grove as William Mason
- 1998: Great Expectations as Cop on Boat
- 1998: Palmetto as Miles Meadows
- 1998: Wild Things as Walter
- 1998: The Truman Show as Citizen Searching Truman (uncredited)
- 1998: Holy Man as Cameraman - Brutus
- 1999: Instinct as Foley
- 2000: The Crew as Driver
- 2000: Tigerland as Tigerland CO
- 2002: Big Trouble as Airport Officer Arch Ridley
- 2002: The Code Conspiracy as Commander
- 2002: Bending All the Rules as Sargeant
- 2002-2003: Ocean Ave. as Jamie O'Keefe
- 2003: 2 Fast 2 Furious as Agent #1
- 2003: From Justin to Kelly as Mr. O'Mara
- 2003: Monster Will / Daddy 'John'
- 2004: Wild Things 2 as Jayson
- 2004: The Punisher as Dante
- 2005: Red Eye as Coast Guard Officer
- 2005: Transporter 2 as U.S. Marshal Brown
- 2005: Natale a Miami as Cop #1
- 2005: Planet Ibsen as Dr. Rank
- 2006: Descansos as Attendent
- 2006: The Hawk Is Dying as Alonzo
- 2006: Hoot as Drill Sergeant
- 2006: Lonely Hearts as Warden Broady
- 2006: Miami Vice as Air Traffic Supervisor
- 2006: Prison Break (TV Series) as Agent Ives
- 2006: South Beach Dreams as Mr. Ellison
- 2007: Walking Tall: The Payback as Herb Sherman
- 2007: Premonition as Sheriff Reilly
- 2007: Cleaner as Vic
- 2007: Matrimonio alle Bahamas as Senator Jones
- 2007: Naked Under Heaven as Bennett
- 2007: Thirteen Floors as Blaine Bauer
- 2007: Burn Notice (TV Series) as Agent Harris
- 2008: Mad Money as Agent Wayne
- 2008: The Mysteries of Pittsburgh as Lenny Burns
- 2008: Recount (TV Movie) as Bob Zoellick
- 2008: Feast II: Sloppy Seconds as The Sheriff
- 2008: Marley & Me as The Police Officer (uncredited)
- 2008: My Life: Untitled as Jenna's Father
- 2009: My Bloody Valentine 3D as Riggs
- 2009: I Love You Phillip Morris as Houston Cop
- 2009: Recession Proof as Max Murphy
- 2009: Nine Dead as Father Francis
- 2010: Father of Invention as Grocery Store Clerk
- 2010: Wild Things: Foursome as Captain Blanchard
- 2010: Conviction as Officer Boisseau
- 2010: The Jack of Spades as Old Dymond
- 2010: Red as Forensics Investigator
- 2010: Stanley DeBrock as Jake
- 2011: Seconds Apart as Father Zinselmeyer
- 2011: Drive Angry as State Police Sergeant
- 2011: Son of Morning as Philip's Father
- 2011: Killer Joe as 'Digger' Soames
- 2011: Dolphin Tale as John Fitch
- 2011: Winter as Board Member Fitch
- 2012: Step Up Revolution as Uniformed Cop
- 2012: Death from Above as Oclar
- 2012: Company M: A Mob of Soldiers as Mr. Smith
- 2013: Broken Blood as Jake
- 2013: Pawn Shop Chronicles as Cook
- 2013: 12 Years a Slave as Captain
- 2013: Assumed Killer as Chief Grimaldi
- 2014: House of Bodies as Corrections Officer
- 2015: All Saints Eve as Preacher William
- 2015: Careful What You Wish For as Gordon
- 2017: Manhattan Cop as Peter Spriggs
