= The Code Conspiracy =

- Directed by: Hank Whetstone
- Written by: Hank Whetstone
- Produced by: Stephen M. Pratt; Philip Terranova; Hank Whetstone; Janice Whetstone
- Starring: Jim Fitzpatrick; Maria Conchita Alonso; David Warner; Lou Rawls; Marc Macaulay; Tom Nowicki
- Cinematography: Mark Woods
- Edited by: Janice Whetstone
- Music by: Christopher L. Stone
- Production company: Alaise Productions
- Distributed by: The Asylum; RCV Home Entertainment
- Release date: April 2, 2002 (Norway)
- Running time: 97 minutes
- Country: United States
- Language: English

The Code Conspiracy is a 2002 American thriller film written and directed by Hank Whetstone and starring Jim Fitzpatrick, Maria Conchita Alonso, and David Warner for The Asylum. The film had a preliminary release at the 2000 New York Independent Film and Video Festival.

== Plot ==
A physics professor (David Warner) is removed from his post because his classroom teaching methods are considered to be too philosophical. He leaves for Israel to work on a project combining science with his love of philosophy.

Six years later he returns to an America now governed by an administration that has brought in strong anti-privacy laws. He is carrying a disc containing the fruits of his research to give to a former student, John Davis (Jim Fitzpatrick), when black ops agents track him down with a view to obtaining the disc and killing him. He manages to hide the disc and make a phone call to John before the agents catch up with him. In subsequent police interviews with Davis he is able to assure them he did not know what was going on, a situation that changes after he listens to his phone messages.

The professor had been working on a code in Israel based on the Pentateuch, the first five books in the Bible, and had found answers to some of life's most basic questions. The formula he has discovered can also solve problems yet to be formulated. John's software company is pleased with the research since it helps them with their current anti-government privacy project: keyless encryption. Before he is able to complete the sale and distribution of the software to a major company, government agents raid his home and company, confiscating all his computers, files and computer programs. While trying to leave the area with his family and move to a more congenial environment, his wife and children are killed in a plane crash. In shock, he turns to friends who help him to escape undetected. Not only American agents but the Mossad give chase as he flees to the Bahamas.

== Cast ==
- Jim Fitzpatrick as John Davis
- Maria Conchita Alonso as Rachel
- David Warner as Professor
- Lou Rawls as Carriage Driver
- Marc Macaulay as Commander
- Tom Nowicki as Chris
- Key Howard as Rocket Scientist
- Jim R. Coleman as Stephen
- Holland Hayes as Dail
- Russell Warner as Ben
- Gail Borges as Mac
- Drew Palmer as Frank
- Bill Cordell as Hunter
- Ashlee Payne as Sarah
- Steve Zurk as Bruce
- Hank Stone as Killer Agent
- Rus Blackwell as Slick Agent
