= Qore (PlayStation Network) =

Interactive online magazine for the PlayStation Network

- Developer: Future Publishing
- Type: VOD
- Launched: June 6, 2008
- Platform: PlayStation 3
- Status: Ended on April 10, 2012

Qore (pronounced "core") was a monthly subscription-based interactive online magazine for the PlayStation Network and replaces the Jampack series of disks offered by PlayStation Underground. Available only in North America, the service offered high definition videos, interviews, and behind-the-scenes footage pertaining to upcoming and recently released PlayStation games. It also offered exclusive access to game demos and betas. The product was available to download to the PlayStation 3 from the PlayStation Store, where users were able to choose to purchase individual episodes or an annual, 13-episode subscription. PlayStation Plus subscribers received Qore free of charge for the duration of their subscription. The magazine was presented by Veronica Belmont & Audrey Cleo and later Jesse Blaze Snider & Tiffany Smith.

Qore aired its 47th and final episode on April 10, 2012.

== History ==
On June 3, 2008, Sony announced a new service, Qore, which launched on the PlayStation Store in North America on June 6, 2008. In the press release published on the Official PlayStation Blog, Qore: Presented by the PlayStation Network was described as "a highly interactive, monthly lifestyle gaming program covering the world inside PlayStation".

Qore for the PlayStation Network

== Service ==
=== Game videos ===
Each episode included a selection of behind-the-scenes videos, previews, interviews and news related to PlayStation products. Videos were presented in 720p. Each episode contains between 25 and 30 minutes of video content, not including advertisements, the opening trailer, or introduction videos.

=== Download center ===
People who purchased a one-year subscription to Qore gained access to exclusive playable and downloadable PSone games, demos, betas, and themes. All content was to be downloaded through the PlayStation Network while signed in through Qore's Download Center.

=== Access ===
Once purchased, Qore programs became available on the PlayStation Store's Download List. If an annual subscription was purchased, episodes were automatically added to the user's Download List. Redeemable codes for Qore episodes have also been included free with each issue of the PlayStation Magazine.

== Notable Content ==
- June 2008, Episode 1 - SOCOM U.S. Navy SEALs: Confrontation beta invitation
- July 2008, Episode 2 - Naruto: Ultimate Ninja Storm demo early access
- August 2008, Episode 3 - Resistance 2 beta invitation
- September 2008, Episode 4 - MotorStorm: Pacific Rift demo early access
- October 2008, Episode 5 - Valkyria Chronicles demo early access
- November 2008, Episode 6 - PlayStation Home closed beta invitation for annual subscribers
- December 2008, Episode 7, Free episode - Flock! demo early access for annual subscribers
- January 2009, Episode 8 - F.E.A.R. 2: Project Origin demo early access
- February 2009, Episode 9 - Syphon Filter PS1 classic voucher
- March 2009, Episode 10 - High Velocity Bowling full PSN game voucher for annual subscribers
- April 2009, Episode 11, Free episode - Linger in Shadows voucher and Red Faction: Guerrilla demo early access for annual subscribers
- May 2009, Episode 12 - Uncharted 2: Among Thieves beta invitation for annual subscribers
- June 2009, Episode 13 - Spyro the Dragon PS1 classic voucher
- July 2009, Episode 14 - Battlefield 1943 theme for all purchasers
- August 2009, Episode 15 - High Velocity Bowling PSN game voucher & Ninja Gaiden Sigma 2 theme for annual subscribers
- September 2009, Episode 16 - MAG beta invitation for annual subscribers
- December 2009, Episode 19 - ModNation Racers Beta invitation for annual subscribers
- May 2010, Episode 42 - LittleBigPlanet Cap

== Access ==
FirstPlay (previously known as Official PlayStation Magazine HD or OPMHD) was an electronic magazine similar to Qore, produced by Future Publishing. Released in April 2010, it is available to PlayStation 3 users via the PlayStation Store in the UK. Like Qore, FirstPlay offered exclusive videos, demos and downloads, but is released weekly instead of monthly. In July 2011 SCEE announced that the FirstPlay service was to end, leaving the 6 July episode as the final FirstPlay to be released. The announcement went on to confirm that a new, then yet-to-be-named service would replace FirstPlay, its focus shifting to SCEE's PlayStation Access events. Access is produced by Future Publishing and delivered via the PSN Store, however unlike its predecessor it is free of charge.

== Criticism ==
The announcement that Qore subscribers will have advanced access to exclusive betas and demos has triggered a mixed reaction from the gaming community. Many users believe this is a covert way of introducing a premium PlayStation Network subscription model, similar to that used on Microsoft's Xbox Live Marketplace service where premium subscribers get game demos one week before they are fully released. Criticism has also been made of the way that advertising is being incorporated into the service.

Gaming commentators have also attacked Qore for being light on content, and for containing too many advertisements (two 20-second spots that can be skipped after the first 5 seconds, and one 15 second spot in the "download section" which cannot be skipped by the viewer). Critics have said that because Qore is a paid-for, premium service, it should not contain so many "intrusive" adverts.
