= Lucy Porter =

English actress, presenter and comedian

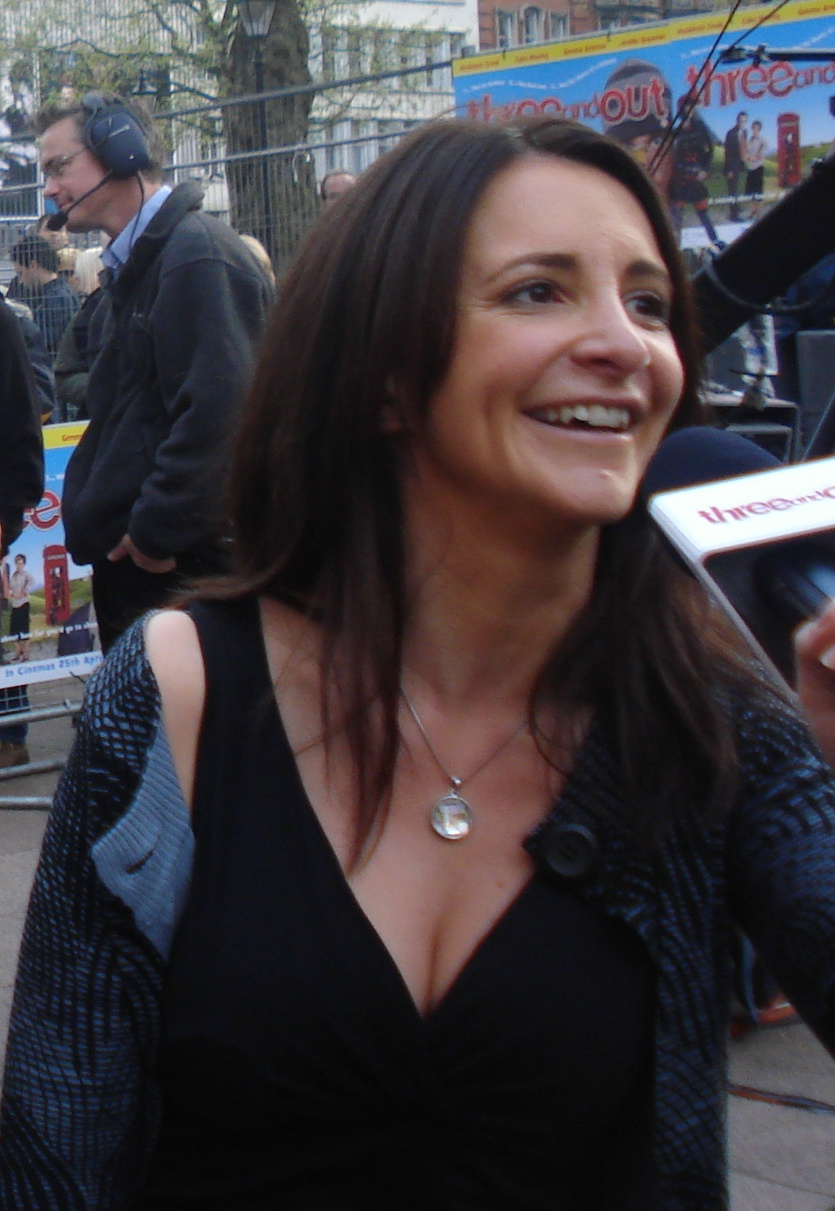
- Porter at the premiere of Three and Out on 21 April 2008
- Born: 27 January 1973 (age 53); London, England
- Education: University of Manchester (BA)
- Occupations: Writer, comedian, actress, and presenter
- Years active: 2000–present
- Spouse: Justin Edwards (m. 2009)
- Children: 2
- Website: lucyporter.co.uk

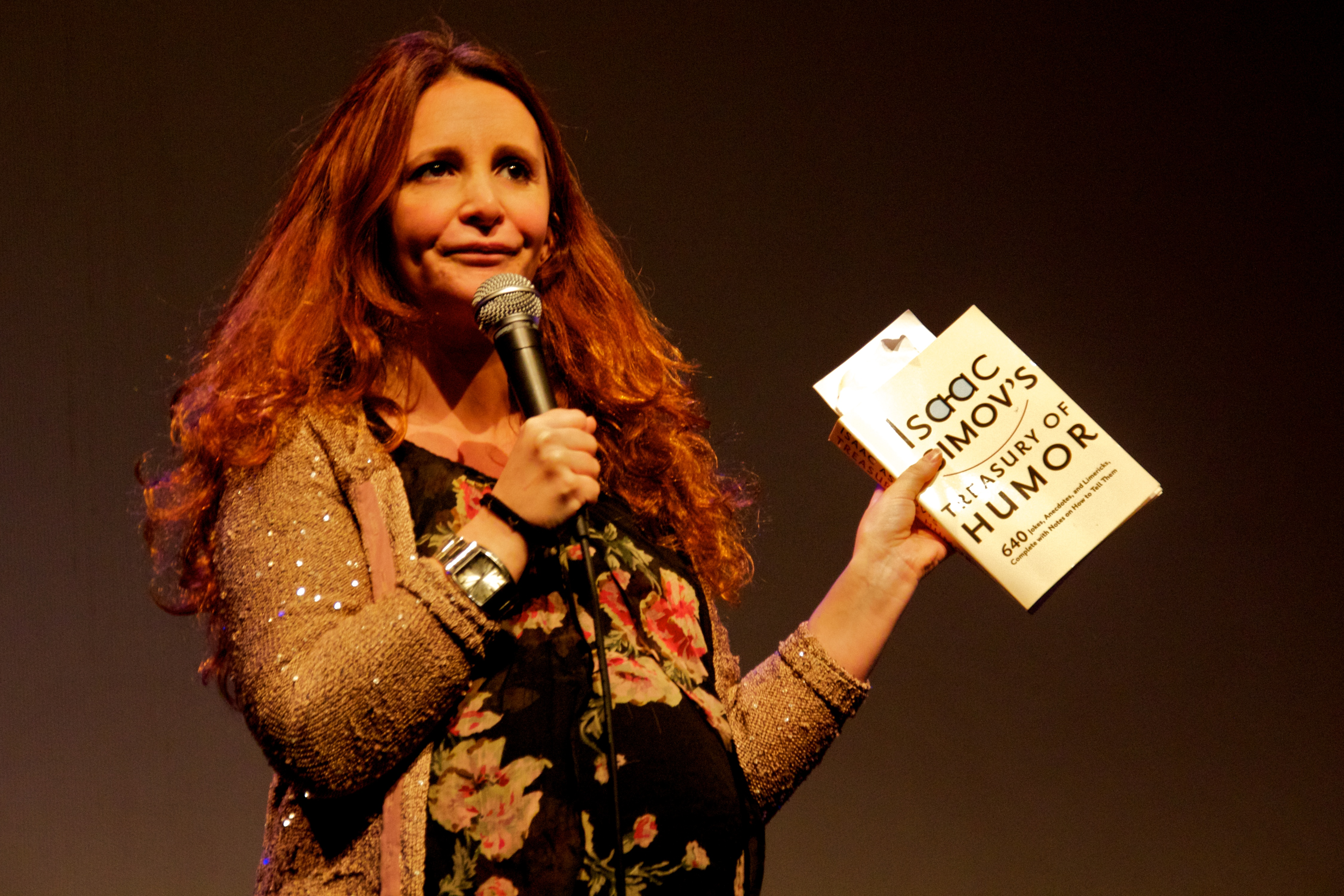
Porter talking at Bright Club London in November 2011

Lucy Donna Porter (born 27 January 1973) is an English actress, writer, presenter, and comedian. She has performed at the Edinburgh Fringe, the Brighton Festival and many clubs around Britain. She is also a regular voice on BBC Radio 4 in various panel shows, including The News Quiz, Quote... Unquote and The Personality Test.

== Career ==
After obtaining a degree in English literature from The University of Manchester, Porter worked as a journalist on the Big Issue in The North. She began to perform stand-up comedy whilst working as a researcher for Granada Television, on programmes such as The Mrs Merton Show. Her first performance was at a club in Chester, a location she chose because it was far enough from home that if it went badly, no one would know her.

As an actress, she made brief appearances in Life's a Pitch and Absolute Power. In the year 2000, she presented a TV commercial for mobile phone company One2One. Her first high-profile acting role was alongside Christian Slater in the stage version of One Flew Over the Cuckoo's Nest at the Edinburgh Fringe in 2004. She reprised her role of a nurse for the 2005 London production.

In 2005, she made regular appearances on Broken News as Claudia Van Sant.

Porter was one of the writers for all nine series of Parsons and Naylor's Pull-Out Sections, appearing as a special guest performer in many editions. Porter starred in The Powder Room alongside Julia Morris and Gina Yashere, which was also broadcast on BBC Radio 2.

She wrote the scripts for two series of BBC Three's Anthea Turner: Perfect Housewife.

She has appeared on several panel shows, including the first episode of Rob Brydon's Annually Retentive (July 2006). She appeared on satirical news quiz show Have I Got News for You (series 32, episode 7), Never Mind the Buzzcocks and Mock the Week (series 7, episode 3).

In May 2007, Porter became host of a The Guardian podcast, Many Questions and more recently The Heckle. In June 2007, Porter came second in a celebrity edition of The Weakest Link. Porter appeared in 2007 on ITV2's Comedy Cuts, a programme showcasing the best of the British stand-up comedy circuit.

In 2008, she began work as a team captain on the BBC Radio 4 panel game Act Your Age.

Porter has recorded her stand-up show The Good Life for a DVD release by independent label Go Faster Stripe, and appeared in the 2008 and 2009 series of Mock the Week.

She was the warm-up act for Mitchell & Webb's television series screenings at the BBC TV Centre.

In 2009, Porter took her show The Bare Necessities on a tour, playing 30 dates between February and June.

In November 2009, Lucy appeared at LIVEstock 2009: Friends of the Earth's comedy and music event at the Hammersmith Apollo in support of the green campaign group's Food Chain Campaign for planet-friendly farming. The same month, Lucy appeared on Celebrity Mastermind, achieving a record-breaking score of 35 with Steve Martin as her specialist subject.

Porter's marriage at the end of 2009 to her long-term partner, fellow comedian Justin Edwards, led to a substantial re-write of her successful 2009 Edinburgh Festival Fringe show Fool's Gold for her 2010 UK tour. In the original script, Porter claimed she was unlikely ever to marry, because of an "allergy to gold", meaning she would never be able to put on a wedding ring; on tour, she made a self-deprecating reference to the original material, given that she was then married.

Porter presented FirstPlay, a weekly digital "magazine" for European customers on the PlayStation 3. She hosts the successor show, Access, which is still available weekly on the PlayStation Network.

In 2011, Porter competed alongside Ed Byrne in Pointless Celebrities, eventually losing in the penultimate round.

Porter created Screaming with Laughter, an afternoon mother-and-baby comedy club. The club tours the country to play for parents with infants under a year old.

In 2014, she wrote her debut stage play, The Fair Intellectual Club, which premièred at the Edinburgh Festival Fringe at the Assembly Rooms, directed by Marilyn Imrie. Porter developed this into a comedy series of the same name for BBC Radio 4, featuring much of the same cast and also directed by Imrie. She has since expressed a desire to write more plays for the Festival in the future.

Porter has appeared on three episodes of QI, in series L, M and N.

In February 2017, Porter was a guest on Richard Herring's Leicester Square Theatre Podcast. Porter, along with professional quizzer Jenny Ryan, launched in 2018 Fingers On Buzzers, a podcast about quiz and game shows. Along with Ryan, Porter returned to Richard Herring's Leicester Square Theatre Podcast in early 2019, and they discussed Fingers On Buzzers and other topics.

In March 2021, Porter chaired the Radio 4 panel game Just a Minute. She was the sixth guest host in the first series since the death of Nicholas Parsons, who had presented almost every episode of the programme since its creation in 1967.

On 6 June 2021 she appeared in the fourth episode of the. BBC Radio 4 programme The Confessional. The series is written and presented by Stephen Mangan.

On 4 March 2022 she appeared in an episode of EastEnders.

== Personal life ==
Porter was born in Croydon, south London, and attended Wallington High School for Girls. She is married to Justin Edwards. The couple have two children.

== Live shows ==
1999
The Gilded Balloon (Edinburgh Festival Fringe)
2002
The Stonewall Gala
2003
Live at the Underbelly (Edinburgh Festival Fringe)
2004
Lady Luck (Edinburgh Festival Fringe)
One Flew Over The Cuckoo's Nest
2005
Happiness
Stand Up For Freedom
2006
The Good Life (UK tour also released on DVD)
Stand Up For Freedom
2007
Lucy Porter's Love In (UK tour)
2008
Lucy And Des Show Off
The Bare Necessities (Edinburgh Festival Fringe)
2009
The Bare Necessities (UK tour)
(6–31 August) Edinburgh Festival Fringe: Fool's Gold
(12 November) LIVEstock 2009, Friends of the Earth's comedy and music event
2010
Fool's Gold (UK tour)
2012
People Person (Edinburgh Festival Fringe)
2013
People Person (UK tour)
Northern Soul (Edinburgh Festival Fringe)
2025
Me Time (UK tour)
2018
Pass It On (Edinburgh Festival Fringe)
2021
Be Prepared (UK tour)
2023
Wake-up Call (UK tour)
2025
No Regrets! (UK tour)
2026
Let Yourself Go! (UK tour)
