= Jim Fitzpatrick (actor) =

American actor (born 1959)

- Born: August 28, 1959 (age 67); Omaha, Nebraska, U.S.
- Occupations: Actor, screenwriter, producer, director
- Years active: 1972–present
- Spouse: Jodi Knotts (1990–present)
- Children: 2
- Football career

No. 83
- Position: Wide receiver

Career information
- High school: Seminole (Seminole, Florida)
- College: Illinois State
- NFL draft: 1981: undrafted

Career history
- Hamilton Tiger-Cats (1981)*; Baltimore Colts (1982)*; Tampa Bay Bandits (1983–1985)
- * Offseason or practice squad member only

James A. Fitzpatrick (born August 28, 1959) is an American actor, producer, screenwriter, director, and former football player. He has appeared in over 65 feature films and television series. He also is the founder and president of Five Star Studios (established in 1992) and PacAtlantic Pictures, LLC (established in 2005).

== Early life ==
Fitzpatrick is from Seminole, Florida. He began acting at age 13 when he appeared in his first school play, A Thousand Clowns, at Seminole High School in Florida. He accepted a football scholarship to Illinois State University, where he was a theater major. While living in Illinois, he became involved with the Steppenwolf Theatre Company, founded by Gary Sinise and John Malkovich.

== Professional football career ==
After going undrafted in the 1981 NFL draft, Fitzpatrick signed with the Hamilton Tiger-Cats of the Canadian Football League (CFL). However, he was released on June 28, 1981, before the start of the 1981 CFL season. He signed with the Baltimore Colts of the National Football League on July 1, 1982. Fitzpatrick left the team on August 22, 1982. He then played for the Tampa Bay Bandits of the United States Football League from 1983 to 1985.

== Acting career ==
Before moving to Los Angeles, he landed supporting roles in the feature films Cocoon and D.A.R.Y.L. His first television acting credit was on Miami Vice.

== Filmography ==
- 1979 Glory Days as Steve Street
- 1985 Walking the Edge as Fat Man's Bodyguard
- 1985 D.A.R.Y.L. as T.A.S.C.O.M. Security Guard
- 1985 Cocoon as Dock Worker
- 1986 Miami Vice as Teddy Lake
- 1986 Santa Barbara as Raz
- 1986 Band of the Hand as Young Street Thug
- 1986 When the Bough Breaks as Reporter #3
- 1987 Shelter in the Storm as River
- 1987 The Last Fling as Bud
- 1987 Designing Women as Garret Jackson
- 1985–1987 Days of Our Lives (4 episodes) Dr. Robinson
- 1986–1988 The New Gidget (5 episodes) as Tom Wilson
- 1989 Tour of Duty as Captain Pescow
- 1989 Guts and Glory: The Rise and Fall of Oliver North as Sergeant Major Collins
- 1990 Ski Patrol as Young Father
- 1990 Sporting Chance as Davis
- 1991 Anything but Love as Detective
- 1992 Stand by Your Man as Kyle
- 1993 South of Sunset as Tony DiNato
- 1993 Sweating Bullets (7 episodes) as "Rip" Chase
- 1993 Renegade as Brett Quinn
- 1994 The Glass Shield as Officer Jim Ryan
- 1994 Curse of the Starving Class as Emerson
- 1995–1996 All My Children (168 episodes) as Pierce Riley
- 1997 Pacific Blue as Captain Frank Hawkins
- 1997 The Little Ghost as Tony
- 1998 Armageddon as Lieutenant Trev Tavis, NORAD Tech.
- 1999 Delta Force Clear Target as Skip Lang
- 1997–2001 JAG as Major Warren / Commander Douglas
- 2001 U.S. Seals as Mike Bradley
- 2002 Unreel: A Hollywood Story as Tommy
- 2002 100 Deeds for Eddie McDowd as Coach Hardgrave
- 2002 The Agency as CIA Agent Gus Allman
- 2002 ER as Lieutenant Colonel McGruen
- 2002 An American Reunion as Jamie
- 2003 Threat Matrix as Robert Burkehart
- 2003 The District (2 episodes) as Weston Buell
- 2001–2005 Star Trek: Enterprise (7 episodes) as Commander Williams
- 2004 The Code Conspiracy as John Davis
- 2004 Supernatural (TV) (Pilot) as Calvin Gordon
- 2005 Elizabethtown as Rusty
- 2005 Distortion as Frank
- 2006 Blood Ranch as "Spider"
- 2006 The Indian as Dr. Vince
- 2007 Hallow's Point as Detective Frank Cates
- 2008 The Belly of the Beast as Adam Simeon
- 2010 The Adventure Scouts as Allen Daniels
- 2011 Dolphin Tale as Max
- 2013 A Fonder Heart as Dr. Evans
- 2013 Eden 2 as Captain Stevens
- 2013 Gangster Squad as Terry McMurray
- 2016 Divorce Texas Style as Ozzie Partington
- 2017 Do You See Me as Detective Jimmy Nichols
- 2019 Time Off as Bernie
- 2020 Mind Games as Roger
- 2021 Bloodsport Generations as Uncle Duck
- 2021 Last of the Grads as Mr Bradley
- 2022 Shark Waters as Poppy
- 2023 Soulmates as Rudy Galiano
- 2025 Off Rip as Father Jim
