= Beehive (TV series) =

British sketch comedy series

- Genre: Comedy
- Written by: Sarah Kendall; Alice Lowe; Barunka O'Shaughnessy; Clare Thomson
- Directed by: Dewi Humphreys; Rupert Jones
- Starring: Sarah Kendall; Alice Lowe; Barunka O'Shaughnessy; Clare Thomson
- Country of origin: United Kingdom
- Original language: English
- No. of episodes: 5

Production
- Producer: Siobhan Bachman
- Production company: Tiger Aspect Productions

Original release
- Network: E4
- Release: 3 December – 17 December 2008

Beehive is a British sketch comedy series which was broadcast in 2008. It stars Australian comedian Sarah Kendall and British comedy actresses Alice Lowe, Barunka O'Shaughnessy, and Clare Thomson, who wrote much of the show's material. Producer Siobhan Rhodes stated prior to production that the show would be about funny women, who do not feature regularly on TV. The show also features Habib Nasib Nader and Jack Whitehall.

== Recurring sketches ==
The politically incorrect South African flight attendants titled Air Afrikaans is a recurring sketch, as is a parody of Sex and the City.

== Reviews ==
Initial reviews of Beehive praised the show's colourful costumes and inventive material, but the majority drew unfavourable comparisons with earlier all-female comedy show Smack the Pony.
