= FirstPlay =

Online video game magazine

- Developer: Future Publishing
- Type: VOD/online magazine
- Launched: 8 April 2010
- Platform: PlayStation 3
- Website: FirstPlay

FirstPlay was a video gaming online magazine published by Future Publishing for Sony Computer Entertainment Europe. It was produced by the team behind PlayStation Official Magazine and features video reviews and previews and screenshots of upcoming and recently released PlayStation 3 games. Episodes were released weekly on the PlayStation Store where users could choose to purchase a single episode or a 90-day subscription at a discounted rate.

== Content ==
Editorial content in FirstPlay was scripted by Associate editor Nathan Ditum and writer Matthew Elliott with contributions from the Official PlayStation Magazine UK team. The videos were edited by a dedicated production team and narrated by Lucy Porter. All video content was presented in 720p, and thus was shown exactly how the user would experience the content in-game. Each episode consists of four sections; HD Reviews & Previews, Network Highlights, Featured Downloads and Screenshot Galleries. Typically, each episode of FirstPlay has four features in each section.

Each episode of FirstPlay is divided into four sections.

The HD Reviews & Previews and Network Highlights sections both offer video content. This consists of reviews of recently released and upcoming PlayStation 3 games and previews of future games in the HD Reviews & Previews section while the Network Highlights section will include different video features each week such as round-ups of the best PlayStation Network games or user-created LittleBigPlanet levels. Advertisements of up to 30 seconds in length are run before each video feature. The user may choose to skip these after they have viewed five in total. Users can control the playback of video content in the same way that they can from video on the XMB, with the ability to pause, rewind, fast-forward and skip.

The Screenshot Galleries feature screenshots of upcoming games. Each screenshot is accompanied by a voice-over providing commentary about a specific image, or general information about the game. The user can zoom into and pan around images and can also export images to their XMB to access from outside of FirstPlay.

The Featured Downloads section offers exclusive downloadable content which varies in each episode. This included free add-ons for retail games, XMB themes, PlayStation Minis, and other content.

== History ==
Sony Computer Entertainment first announced in September 2008 that they were working with Future Publishing to produce an "on-console digital magazine" for PlayStation Network users in Europe. This was following the earlier release of Qore, a similar service available to users in North America. The service was initially scheduled for release in early 2009. In October 2009 it was revealed through a Future Publishing job listing that the service would be called Official PlayStation Magazine HD (or OPMHD). The product was finally announced as FirstPlay in February 2010 and it was confirmed that it would launch in Spring 2010. The first issue of FirstPlay was released on the PlayStation Store on 8 April 2010.

In July 2011 SCEE announced that the FirstPlay service was to end, leaving the 6 July 2011 episode as the final FirstPlay to be released. The announcement confirmed that a new, yet-to-be-named service would replace FirstPlay, its focus shifting to SCEE's PlayStation Access events. As with its predecessor this new service would be produced by Future Publishing and delivered via the PSN Store, however this time the show would be free of charge.

== Presenters ==
- Lucy Porter (main)
- Rachel Weber (episodes 28–33, and 48)
- Niamh Shaw (episodes 25 and 26)

== Editorial Team ==
- Nathan Ditum – Associate editor
- Matthew Elliott – Freelance writer

== Production Team ==
- David Boddington – Content producer
- James Jarvis – Assistant producer
- Liz Wilson – PS3 Developer
- Paul Stevenson – Video editor
- Dan Read – Video editor

== Episodes and Reception ==
FirstPlay had a total of 64 episodes, with the last being shown on 6 July 2011. It is due to be replaced with a new show.

FirstPlay initially received a generally mixed reaction from viewers. Many complained about the lack of content in each episode, the unfulfilled promise of exclusive downloadable content and the fact that it was only available in the United Kingdom. The initial episodes received an average rating of 3.8 stars out of five on the PlayStation Store's ratings system. Overtime, viewer opinions became more positive, with many agreeing that content has improved and the writing has become tighter, while still criticizing the relative lack of expansion to other territories. Later episodes have received an average rating of 4.4 stars out of five.

== Expansion ==
Originally only available in the United Kingdom, FirstPlay expanded to Ireland on 19 May 2010, during the show's seventh episode, with expansion to further regions promised in the future.

== Qore ==
Qore is an electronic magazine similar to FirstPlay, produced by Future Publishing. Released in June 2008, it is available to PlayStation 3 users via the PlayStation Store in the USA. Like FirstPlay, Qore offers exclusive videos, demos and downloads. but is released monthly instead of weekly.
