= Do not disturb =

Do not disturb may refer to:

== As an instruction ==
- "Do not disturb" sign
- Do Not Disturb (telecommunications), a function on most PBX or PABX systems
- Do Not Disturb, a feature of Apple's iOS operating system, accessible via Control Center or Settings on iOS devices; similar feature exists on Android and Windows

== Film and television ==
- Do Not Disturb (1965 film), a film starring Doris Day, directed by Ralph Levy
- Do Not Disturb (1999 film), a film starring Jennifer Tilly
- Do Not Disturb, a 2003 film starring Ian Tracey
- Do Not Disturb (2010 film), a horror-thriller film written and directed by BC Furtney
- Do Not Disturb (2012 film), a French comedy film
- Do Not Disturb (2013 film), a film by BC Furtney
- Do Not Disturb (2014 film), a French film by Patrice Leconte
- Do Not Disturb (2016 film), a British television comedy film starring Catherine Tate
- Do Not Disturb (2022 film), a Canadian horror-thriller film
- Do Not Disturb (TV series), a 2008 American sitcom
- "Do Not Disturb" (Fear the Walking Dead), an episode
- "Doo Not Disturb", an episode of Be Cool, Scooby-Doo!

== Music ==
=== Albums ===
- Do Not Disturb (Joanne Accom album), 2001
- Do Not Disturb (Van der Graaf Generator album), 2016
- Do Not Disturb, by Jim Verraros, 2011
- Do Not Disturb, by Young Miko, 2025
- Do Not Disturb, a mixtape by Nemzzz, 2024

=== Songs ===
- "Do Not Disturb" (Bananarama song), 1985
- "Do Not Disturb", by Drake from More Life, 2017
- "Do Not Disburb", by Halestorm from Vicious, 2018
- "Do Not Disturb", by Mahalia from Love and Compromise, 2019
- "Do Not Disturb", by Ryan Adams from Big Colors, 2021
- "Do Not Disturb", by Smokepurpp and Murda Beatz from Bless Yo Trap, 2018
- "Do Not Disturb", by Steve Aoki from Neon Future III, 2018
- "Do Not Disturb", by YG from 4Real 4Real, 2019

== Books ==
- Do Not Disturb (book), 2021 non-fiction book by journalist Michela Wrong

== See also ==
- Please Do Not Disturb, a 2010 Iranian film
- Please Do Not Disturb (album), a 1997 album by Juliana Hatfield
- DND (disambiguation)
- Do Knot Disturb, a 2009 Bollywood film
