= Gerry Lively =

British film director

Gerry Lively (November 10, 1946 – November 7, 2025) was a British cinematographer and film director, known for directing Darkness Falls (1999), Dungeons & Dragons: Wrath of the Dragon God (2005), and Body Armour (2007). He also served as the director of photography for several horror films, notably Hellraiser III: Hell on Earth, Hellraiser: Bloodline, Return of the Living Dead 3, and Children of the Corn III: Urban Harvest.

== Film work ==
As a director, his early work was an Italian/American drama called Hot steps - passi caldi, which was released in 1990. The film starred Lindsley Allen and Nicole Kidman. Lively directed the 2002 film Shattered Lies, a film about corrupt policemen and a man and a woman who are after 3 million dollars. It starred Frank Zagarino, Elizabeth Giordano, and James Russo. He directed the horror film All Saints Eve, a film about a curse from the 1800s and a group of friends who have to find the cause of it before they become victims.

== Filmography ==
=== Director ===
- Body Moves - (Hot steps - passi caldi) - 1990
- Darkness Falls - 1999
- The Guardian - 2000
- Shattered Lies - 2002
- Dungeons & Dragons: Wrath of the Dragon God - 2005
- Body Armour - 2007
- The Art of War III: Retribution - 2009
- Dungeons & Dragons 3: The Book of Vile Darkness - 2012
- All Saints Eve - 2015

Made for television

- Windfall - 2003
- Finish Line - 2008
