= Dumb and Dumber (disambiguation) =

Dumb and Dumber is a 1994 film.

Dumb and Dumber may also refer to:

- Dumb and Dumber (franchise), based on the film
  - Dumb and Dumber (TV series)
- "Dumb & Dumber" (song), by iKon, 2016

== See also ==
- Dum and Dummer, a 2019 album by Young Dolph and Key Glock
