= Dungeons & Dragons 3: The Book of Vile Darkness =

2012 dark fantasy film directed by Gerry Lively

- DVD cover
- Directed by: Gerry Lively
- Screenplay by: Brian Rudnick
- Story by: Robert Kimmel; Brian Rudnick
- Based on: Dungeons & Dragons by Wizards of the Coast; Book of Vile Darkness by; Monte Cook; Robert J. Schwalb
- Produced by: Steve Richards; Brian Rudnick
- Starring: Jack Derges; Eleanor Gecks; Barry Aird; Lex Daniels; Habib Nasib Nader; Dominic Mafham
- Cinematography: Emil Topuzov
- Edited by: Rebecca Weigold Stocker
- Music by: The Newton Brothers
- Production companies: After Dark Films; Zinc Entertainment
- Distributed by: IM Global
- Release date: 9 August 2012
- Running time: 86 minutes
- Country: United Kingdom
- Language: English
- Budget: $12 million

Dungeons & Dragons 3: The Book of Vile Darkness is a 2012 direct-to-video British dark fantasy adventure film directed by Gerry Lively. It is the third installment in the Dungeons & Dragons film series. Shot in Bulgaria in 2011, it was released direct-to-DVD in the United Kingdom on 9 August 2012 and premiered in the United States as a Syfy Original Movie on 24 November 2012.

== Plot ==
Nhagruul the Foul was an evil sorcerer who spread despair throughout his mortal life. As he neared his end, he sold his soul to the demon lords of the Abyss. His skin was turned into pages, his bones into a cover, his blood became ink for the pages, and the Book of Vile Darkness was born. Anyone who looked into the Book became evil. The kingdom of Karkoth was consumed by evil until a group of warriors called the Knights of the New Sun arose and saved the people using amulets given to them by the God of light, Pelor. Using the amulet, they channeled the God's power and light overcame darkness. Such power could be wielded, owing to the purity of their hearts. The ink was destroyed by the Knights but the pages and the covers could not be recovered as the followers of Nhagruul had them hidden. As people began to forget that Nhagruul existed, the power of the Knights dimmed.

2000 years later, a new Paladin named Grayson is recruited into the Knight order, but like all Knights through the centuries, the power of the amulet is not granted to him by the God Pelor. However, while speaking to his father about this failure, all the Knights are killed by a group of barbarians and his father is abducted. Hoping to find his father, Grayson joins a crew that's working with the barbarians, and looking for the horn that will lead them to the cover of the Book. The crew comprises Akordia, a Shadar-kai sorceress; Seith, a human assassin; Vimak, a Goliath barbarian; and Bezz, a human Vermin Lord.

The horn is guarded by a wyvern that is slain by Grayson, saving Akordia, who falls in love with him. The group goes to the nearby town, where they are hailed as heroes. As Grayson and Akordia spend the night together and Vimak spends the night with a plethora of women, Seith takes all of the town's treasure. The town's mayor discovers this, and blocks the group from leaving; Grayson manages to compromise with him by letting the town keep half the treasure. But Bezz kills the mayor, sparking a fight that results in the townspeople being killed. At night, after the group makes camp, Grayson poisons Vimak with a vial he purchased, then places his body and the treasure in a bag of holding and throws it into the nearby lake. Seith threatens Grayson to get the horn, but is killed by Bezz.

The horn leads the remaining three to encounter an undead child called a Slaymate, where they are forced to let it feed on their negative energy in order to prove themselves free of decency and thus worthy of obtaining the Book's cover; the Slaymate hungrily feeds from the morally bankrupt Bezz; Grayson's unlawful deeds are enough to pacify the creature; but when Akordia's turn comes, her burgeoning feelings for Grayson poison the creature and she fails the test. The Slaymate summons a Helmed Horror to kill them before disappearing. Bezz is stabbed through the chest as it appears, with Akordia and Grayson fighting the Helmed Horror. Disposing of the construct, the two finally retrieve the cover of the Book.

The evil Lord Shathrax transports them to his stronghold, where he's extracting ink for the book from the pain of the purest Knight: Grayson's father. Grayson rescues his father, but they discover there's nowhere to run, because the stronghold is a collection of floating islands in the Shadowfell. As they're about to be captured again, Grayson's father suggests suicide, but Grayson insists that a pure knight never loses hope. As a result, his amulet is imbued with the power of Pelor, and they start to defeat their enemies, until Bezz launches a sneak attack. Bezz plans to use Grayson's pain as ink for the book, since he's known all along that Grayson is the purest knight. But Akordia returns Grayson's amulet, and they manage to defeat Shathrax and his followers. Akordia and Grayson, despite their relationship, part ways at the end because of their different natures, with Bezz escaping as a cloud of insects.

== Cast ==
- Jack Derges as Grayson, a young knight
- Eleanor Gecks as Akordia, a sorceress
- Barry Aird as Bezz, a Vermin Lord
- Lex Daniels as Seith, an assassin
- Habib Nasib Nader as Vimak, a barbarian
- Charlotte Hunter as Carlotta, a prostitute
- Anthony Howell as Ranfin
- Kaloian Vodenicharov as Shifter
- Dominic Mafham as The Mayor of Little Silver Keep
- Ryan Jackson as Warlock

== Distribution ==
The film was distributed by IM Global, which was later merged into the company Global Road, which went bankrupt in 2018.
