= Barunka O'Shaughnessy =

British actress, writer and producer

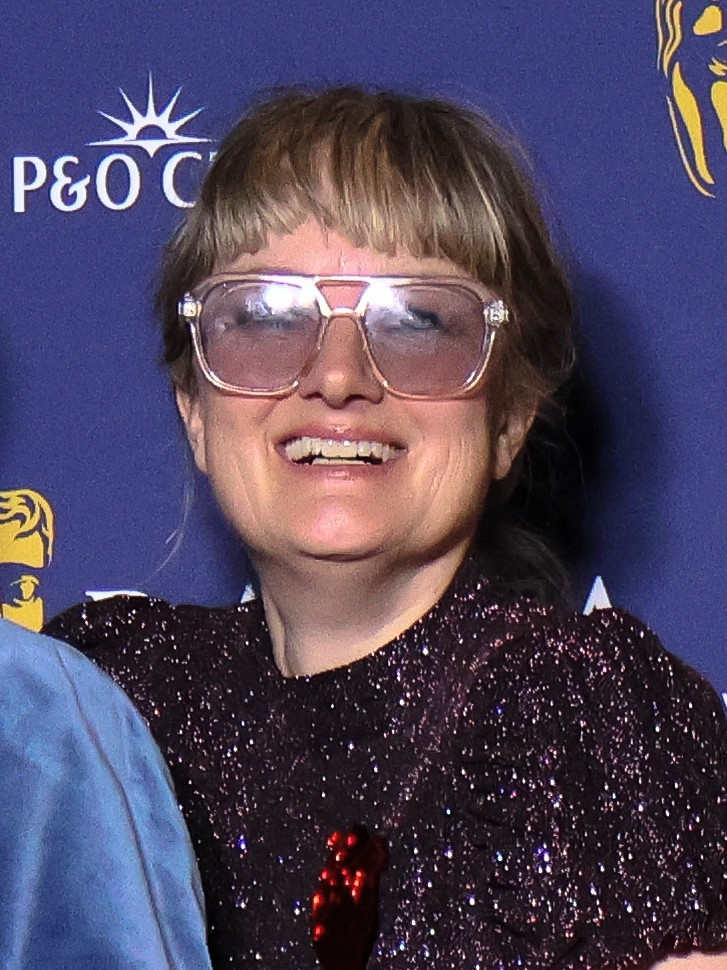
- O'Shaughnessy in 2026
- Born: August 1973 (age 53); Kingston upon Thames, Greater London, England
- Education: University of Cambridge
- Years active: 2007–present

Barunka Sarah G. O'Shaughnessy (born August 1973) is a British actress, writer and producer. She is best known for playing Sacha Merrion on Bo! in the USA and for her appearances in The Mighty Boosh.

== Early life ==
O'Shaughnessy was born in Kingston upon Thames, Greater London. She is of Irish and Czech parentage. She began performing comedy while a student at Cambridge University.

== Career ==
After graduating from Cambridge, O'Shaughnessy collaborated with university friends Lucy Montgomery and James Bachman to write and perform shows at the Edinburgh Festival, forming the Population 3 Theatre company.

She has appeared in Mr and Mrs Fandango for Channel 4 as part of the Comedy Lab series and has also appeared in E4's comedy sketch show Beehive. Other notable television credits include That Mitchell and Webb Look, Bremner, Bird and Fortune and Extras. She has also appeared in the yearly Christmas TV adverts for Boots.

On radio, she has starred in Sasha's Best of British, a comedy pilot for BBC Radio 2 which was broadcast on 12 May 2007. She plays Ping in the BBC Radio 4 sitcom Ed Reardon's Week (Series 2 and 5 onwards).

As a writer, she has worked on Katy Brand's Big Ass Show, Comedy Lab, Beehive, School of Comedy, Hunderby, Timewasters and Motherland. In 2001 she produced two seasons of the British television series Fanorama, starring David Mitchell, Rhys Thomas, Claudia Winkleman and Lauren Laverne. She also co-wrote and produced the Channel 5 drama The Teacher, starring Sheridan Smith.

As herself, she has guested on The Law of the Playground, The Story of Light Entertainment, and Never Mind the Buzzcocks.
