= List of The Thick of It episodes =

The Thick of It is a British comedy television series that satirises the inner workings of modern government. It was first broadcast on BBC Four in 2005, switching to BBC Two for the third series. The Thick of It ran for 20 half-hour episodes, two hour-long specials plus a 15-minute mini episode, as well as a spin-off film, In the Loop, released in 2009.

== Details ==
The first run of three episodes screened on BBC Four from 19 May 2005. A further three episodes were transmitted 20 October – 3 November 2005. The six episodes were repeated on BBC Two in early 2006, and later on BBC America together as a single series. The subsequent DVD release of all six episodes calls them The Complete First Series. An hour-long Christmas special, "The Rise of the Nutters", aired in January 2007 with a further ten episodes planned for later on in the year, however this did not occur. Instead, another one-off hour-long episode "Spinners and Losers" aired on 3 July 2007. It was followed by a 15-minute extra which was made available through BBC Red Button.

For the belated Series 3, transmission switched to BBC Two, simulcast on BBC HD, with subsequent repeats on BBC Four. The series ran for eight episodes from 24 October 2009 to 12 December 2009 (several months after the release of a theatrical film based on the series, In the Loop). As a Red Button extra, each episode had an accompanying 10-minute documentary titled Out of The Thick of It broadcast immediately afterwards and on the BBC Comedy website, which featured cut scenes, specially written scenes and, later, discussion of the programme by the series' writers and makers and with figures involved in British politics.

Another hiatus of several years followed the conclusion of Series 3, with Series 4 launching on BBC Two on 8 September 2012 and consisting of seven episodes, one of which was an hour long.

== Series overview ==
Series	Episodes	Originally released		
Series	Episodes	First released	Last released	Network
1	3	19 May 2005	2 June 2005	BBC Four
2	3	20 October 2005	3 November 2005	BBC Four
Specials	2	2 January 2007	3 July 2007	BBC Four
3	8	24 October 2009	12 December 2009	BBC Two
4	7	8 September 2012	27 October 2012	BBC Two

== Episodes ==
=== Series 1 (2005) ===
No. overall	No. in series	Title	Directed by	Written by	Original release date
1	1	"Series 1 – Episode 1"	Armando Iannucci	Jesse Armstrong & Armando Iannucci	19 May 2005
Cliff Lawton MP is given the boot and swiftly replaced by Hugh Abbott and his staff. Hoping to start his tenure in a blaze of publicity he calls a press conference, but after his 'Snooper Squad' idea is killed, Abbott and his staff have forty minutes to come up with a new policy.
2	2	"Series 1 – Episode 2"	Armando Iannucci	Simon Blackwell, Tony Roche, Jesse Armstrong & Armando Iannucci	26 May 2005
Malcolm is concerned that Abbott is not keeping in touch with the man or woman on the street and orders him to catch up on modern pop culture. In an attempt to formulate a popular new strategy, Hugh gets a very focused focus group in to tell him which one of two contradictory policies to go for.
3	3	"Series 1 – Episode 3"	Armando Iannucci	Simon Blackwell, Jesse Armstrong & Armando Iannucci	2 June 2005
Malcolm thinks Hugh's empty flat in London could pose a problem for the successful Second Home Housing Bill. Meanwhile, Hugh develops a dislike for his media-savvy junior minister Dan Miller and Malcolm explains the art of a "good resignation".

=== Series 2 (2005) ===
Some DVDs package these episodes with Series 1 as a single six-episode series.

No. overall	No. in series	Title	Directed by	Written by	Original release date
4	1	"Series 2 – Episode 1"	Armando Iannucci	Jesse Armstrong, Simon Blackwell, Armando Iannucci & Tony Roche	20 October 2005
At a ministerial visit to a factory, Hugh is accosted by a member of the public. With Terri away on compassionate leave, only Malcolm can help bury the story, but will he? Meanwhile, Ollie is dating an opposition advisor and hastily seconded to Downing Street to "ring his girlfriend".
5	2	"Series 2 – Episode 2"	Armando Iannucci	Jesse Armstrong, Simon Blackwell, Armando Iannucci & Tony Roche	27 October 2005
There's a cabinet reshuffle in the offing and the PM's new 'blue skies' advisor Julius is making trouble. Robyn Murdoch struggles to cover Terri's duties, and is removed from Malcolm's morning meetings.
6	3	"Series 2 – Episode 3"	Armando Iannucci	Jesse Armstrong, Simon Blackwell, Armando Iannucci & Tony Roche	3 November 2005
Hugh attempts to toe the party line on special schools whilst staying true to his conscience. He also accidentally sends an eight-year-old girl an expletive-laden email, intended for Glenn, and Terri faces the blame.

=== Specials (2007) ===
No. overall	No. special	Title	Directed by	Written by	Original release date
7	1	"The Rise of the Nutters"	Armando Iannucci	Jesse Armstrong, Simon Blackwell, Armando Iannucci & Tony Roche	2 January 2007
While Hugh Abbott's away, new enemies rear their heads inside and outside the government. A disastrous Newsnight interview, an opposition "week at the coalface" and a leaked "legacy" leave the PM with no choice but to resign six months early.
8	2	"Spinners and Losers"	Armando Iannucci	Jesse Armstrong, Simon Blackwell, Armando Iannucci & Tony Roche	3 July 2007
When the PM resigns, the government go berserk over one night looking for a successor who is not Tom. Will Malcolm spin out of control?
–	–	"Opposition Extra"	Armando Iannucci	Jesse Armstrong, Simon Blackwell, Armando Iannucci & Tony Roche	3 July 2007
Mini-episode. Peter Mannion's attempts at a peaceful evening are thwarted by public relations. Was locking his advisor in his new bathroom a good career move?

=== Series 3 (2009) ===
No. overall	No. in series	Title	Directed by	Written by	Original release date
9	1	"Series 3 – Episode 1"	Armando Iannucci	Jesse Armstrong, Simon Blackwell, Roger Drew, Sean Gray, Armando Iannucci, Ian Martin, Tony Roche, Will Smith	24 October 2009
Nicola Murray MP replaces Hugh Abbott as Secretary of State at DoSAC and comes without her own staff, so Glenn and Ollie find themselves unexpectedly keeping their jobs. Meanwhile, Malcolm is arranging publicity for a by-election. The term "omnishambles" is used for the first time in this episode.
10	2	"Series 3 – Episode 2"	Armando Iannucci	Jesse Armstrong, Simon Blackwell, Roger Drew, Sean Gray, Armando Iannucci, Ian Martin, Tony Roche, Will Smith	31 October 2009
A week since Nicola took over at DoSAC, and there's a catastrophic error with immigration figures on the department computers. Meanwhile, the press are speculating over the new Minister's longevity.
11	3	"Series 3 – Episode 3"	Armando Iannucci	Jesse Armstrong, Simon Blackwell, Roger Drew, Sean Gray, Armando Iannucci, Ian Martin, Tony Roche, Will Smith	7 November 2009
Nicola and Ollie are writing her speech for the party conference in Eastbourne, while Glenn and Malcolm clash over a great publicity opportunity.
12	4	"Series 3 – Episode 4"	Armando Iannucci	Jesse Armstrong, Simon Blackwell, Roger Drew, Sean Gray, Armando Iannucci, Ian Martin, Tony Roche, Will Smith	14 November 2009
The civil servants at DoSAC prepare for a visit from shadow Social Affairs minister Peter Mannion, while Nicola has enough on her plate when her daughter's headmaster calls.
13	5	"Series 3 – Episode 5"	Armando Iannucci	Simon Blackwell, Roger Drew, Sean Gray, Armando Iannucci, Ian Martin, Tony Roche, Will Smith	21 November 2009
Nicola Murray and Peter Mannion go head to head on the Richard Bacon show on BBC Radio 5 Live, but when breaking news ruins the agenda, Malcolm descends upon the studios.
14	6	"Series 3 – Episode 6"	Armando Iannucci	Simon Blackwell, Roger Drew, Sean Gray, Armando Iannucci, Ian Martin, Tony Roche, Will Smith	28 November 2009
Whilst the PM is away on a world tour, the media begin to consider Nicola as a potential challenger to party leadership, forcing Malcolm to put aside his duties and intervene.
15	7	"Series 3 – Episode 7"	Armando Iannucci	Jesse Armstrong, Simon Blackwell, Roger Drew, Sean Gray, Armando Iannucci, Ian Martin, Tony Roche, Will Smith	5 December 2009
DoSAC are attempting to launch a new Healthy Living campaign, while Malcolm is absent, supposedly on holiday – but everyone knows that Malcolm does not take holidays.
16	8	"Series 3 – Episode 8"	Armando Iannucci	Jesse Armstrong, Simon Blackwell, Roger Drew, Sean Gray, Armando Iannucci, Ian Martin, Tony Roche, Will Smith	12 December 2009
Malcolm finds himself running out of both options and friends as the election looms, until he finds help being offered from an unlikely quarter.

=== Series 4 (2012) ===
No. overall	No. in series	Title	Directed by	Written by	Original release date
17	1	"Series 4 – Episode 1"	Natalie Bailey	Will Smith with Simon Blackwell, Sean Gray, Ian Martin, David Quantick, Tony Roche	8 September 2012
MP Peter Mannion is taking charge at the Department of Social Affairs and Citizenship as part of a coalition government. However, he must also work with junior minister Fergus Williams, an arrangement neither man is enjoying. As the series begins, Fergus excitedly prepares to launch his new digital education initiative Silicon Playgrounds, with the tag line "I Call App Britain", until Downing Street spin doctor Stewart Pearson announces technophobe Peter is going to be the spokesman for it instead.
18	2	"Series 4 – Episode 2"	Billy Sneddon	Simon Blackwell with Roger Drew, Dan Gaster, Sean Gray, Ian Martin	15 September 2012
Leader of the Opposition Nicola Murray finds herself facing a new set of pressures following her party's election defeat, including being harassed by a man in an unusual costume. However, her problems mount when journalists get a glimpse of some embarrassing meeting notes – and she starts to worry about how close fellow shadow cabinet member Dan Miller is getting to media strategist Malcolm Tucker.
19	3	"Series 4 – Episode 3"	Natalie Bailey	Ian Martin and Will Smith	22 September 2012
Stewart Pearson takes Peter Mannion to a "Thought Camp" at a remote country mansion. While they're away and out of mobile phone range, Fergus invites an attractive female economist into the department to discuss her idea about creating a taxpayer-funded community bank. However, when NHS housing campaigner "Mr Tickle" commits suicide, Fergus is forced to make a rash decision and Peter finds himself on a slippery slope.
20	4	"Series 4 – Episode 4"	Becky Martin	Sean Gray with Simon Blackwell, Tony Roche	29 September 2012
Malcolm's patience with Nicola Murray's leadership is at an end. As Nicola is stuck on a train on the way to Bradford with a crew from Sky News, and with Ollie in hospital recovering from an appendix removal, Malcolm hatches a plan with Ollie, Ben Swain and Dan Miller to double cross Nicola, and force her to resign.
21	5	"Series 4 – Episode 5"	Chris Addison	Roger Drew and Sean Gray	13 October 2012
The unravelling of the key-worker housing sell-off policy forces both Nicola Murray and Peter Mannion onto the defensive, and thus begins a race for the moral high ground. But the more they try to spin the story, the bigger the scandal becomes.
22	6	"Series 4 – Episode 6"	Armando Iannucci	Simon Blackwell, Roger Drew, Dan Gaster, Sean Gray, Ian Martin, Georgia Pritchett, David Quantick, Tony Roche, Will Smith	20 October 2012
In an hour-long special, the coalition government, the civil service staff of DoSAC, and the opposition find themselves under the scrutiny of the Lord Justice Goolding Inquiry into Mr Tickel's death and the practice of leaking in politics.
23	7	"Series 4 – Episode 7"	Tony Roche	Tony Roche with Simon Blackwell, Sean Gray, Ian Martin, Will Smith	27 October 2012
The Home Office has cut police numbers, created a huge backlog of arrest paperwork, and managed to blame DoSAC for the enormous queues at police stations. At Malcolm's suggestion, Dan Miller gets sent on a fact-finding mission to the local cop-shop to press the flesh, in the belief that it will make the Government look unresponsive. Or does he have another motive?

== Other media ==
=== In the Loop ===
In the Loop is a 2009 spin-off film by the makers of the series, starring many members of the same cast, albeit in different roles. The only actual returning characters are Malcolm Tucker, Jamie McDonald, and Malcolm's secretary Sam, played by Samantha Harrington. The film gained worldwide release, won widespread critical acclaim, and was nominated for an Academy Award for Best Writing (Adapted Screenplay).

=== Out of The Thick of It ===
Running concurrently with the third series of The Thick of It, the BBC also ran an online webisode series, entitled Out of The Thick of It, containing both short, new storylines, and deleted scenes, mainly starring Terri and Robyn. Later episodes also included interviews with the cast and crew. All of these episodes were included on the Series 3 DVD.

No.	Title	Directed by	Written by	Original release date
1	"Series 3 – Webisode 1"	Unknown	Unknown	26 October 2009
Terri and Robyn discuss the new administration over a working lunch. Also contains deleted scenes from episode one.
2	"Series 3 – Webisode 2"	Unknown	Unknown	2 November 2009
Terri and Robyn attempt to solve the loss of data at DoSAC. Also contains deleted scenes from episode two.
3	"Series 3 – Webisode 3"	Unknown	Unknown	9 November 2009
Terri and Robyn liaise over the phone whilst Nicola attends the annual party conference. Also contains deleted scenes from episode three.
4	"Series 3 – Webisode 4"	Unknown	Unknown	16 November 2009
Robyn quizzes Terri on Peter Mannion's visit to DoSAC, and Terri's personal interest in it. Also contains deleted scenes from episode four.
5	"Series 3 – Webisode 5"	Unknown	Unknown	23 November 2009
Documentary. Richard Bacon and the show's cast discuss the involvement of BBC Radio 5 Live in the creation of episode five. Also features interviews from real-life political figures.
6	"Series 3 – Webisode 6"	Unknown	Unknown	30 November 2009
Documentary. The cast and crew discuss Malcolm Tucker and his emotional breakdown, as well as Nicola Murray's inadvertent run for the leadership position.
7	"Series 3 – Webisode 7"	Unknown	Unknown	7 December 2009
Documentary. The cast and crew discuss Steve Fleming's motivations and impact upon the series, along with the downfall of Malcolm Tucker
8	"Series 3 – Webisode 8"	Unknown	Unknown	14 December 2009
Documentary. Cast and crew discuss Steve Fleming and Lord Nicholsons' influence on government, and the series' final moments.
