= Malcolm Tucker =

Character from The Thick of It

- The Thick of It character
- First appearance: Series 1, episode 1
- Last appearance: Series 4, episode 7
- Created by: Armando Iannucci
- Portrayed by: Peter Capaldi

In-universe information
- Gender: Male
- Occupation: Director of Communications for Number 10 (Series 1-3); General Election Adviser (Series 1-3); Director of Communications for the Opposition (Series 4); Media advisor to the Leader of the Opposition (Series 4)
- Nationality: Scottish

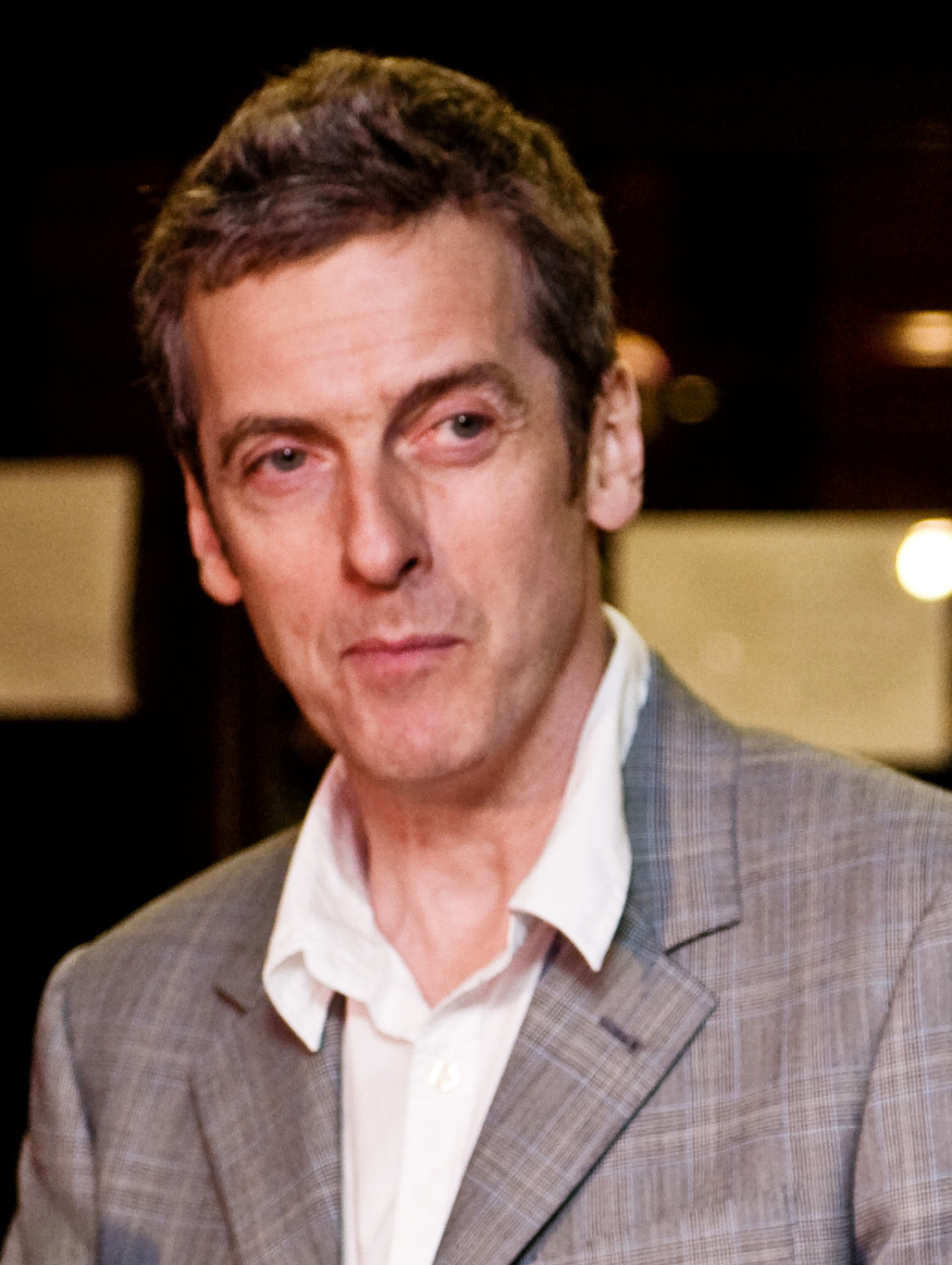
Peter Capaldi portrayed Tucker in the series.

Malcolm Tucker is the fictional antihero of the BBC political satire The Thick of It, portrayed by Peter Capaldi. He is the Director of Communications for his party in both Government and Opposition, acting as the Prime Minister's chief enforcer overseeing cabinet ministers. Tucker was originally a secondary character, with Hugh Abbot (Chris Langham) as the protagonist being watched over by Tucker. However, after Langham left the series the show directed more attention towards Tucker and his dealings with the fictional Department of Social Affairs and Citizenship (DoSAC) – originally the Department of Social Affairs (DSA) in series 1 and 2 – which is portrayed as inept and incompetent. He is one of only three characters from the series to appear in the film In the Loop, along with Tucker's deputy, Jamie McDonald, Senior Press Officer at No. 10, and Tucker’s assistant Sam.

== Background and personal life ==
Other than the fact that he is Scottish and the character traits he exhibits during the series, little is known about Tucker's background or personal life. The nature of his home life is ambiguous and is somewhat contradictory through the course of the series. In the special episode "Spinners and Losers" he is revealed to have a niece; during a rant in front of Ollie in series 4, and speaking of himself in the third person, he explicitly states that he has no children (nor friends for that matter), and in series 3 he is shown spending his 50th birthday alone in his office. However, at other times, there are hints that he has a family; he wears a wedding ring (however, this is more likely to be Peter Capaldi's wedding ring, which he refuses to remove) and there are children's drawings on the walls of his office. The reasons for his deep personal animosity towards journalist Simon Hewitt, mostly left open to speculation in the final cut, are explained to Ollie by Terri in one of the deleted scenes: Hewitt's current girlfriend, BBC health correspondent Kelly Grogan, had been Tucker's girlfriend until about three months earlier.

Tucker is implied to be a recovering alcoholic on a few occasions, another trait that matches Alastair Campbell. One such example is in Season 3 when he retrieves a bottle of whisky from his desk and pours a sympathetic drink for Nicola; not only does Tucker not pour one for himself, but he notes it is so unused it has "still got some of Anthony Eden's lipstick on the bottle." Before the start of the series he forced his predecessor Steve Fleming (David Haig) to resign by announcing to the press that Fleming was resigning before even informing him, thereby leaving him no choice. No mention is made of Tucker's professional background before taking the position as Director of Communications for Number 10.

== Personality ==
Tucker's personality makes him infamous and feared along the halls of Westminster. The series contains several scenes denoting a rather complex personality. His short temper means he is likely to verbally abuse anyone who has caused him or the government embarrassment, stress or irritancy with his hallmark of foul language. He acts as the Prime Minister's enforcer to ensure the cabinet ministers all follow the party line, and manages the government's crisis management PR—usually in the form of spin. He regularly uses rumours, smears, or threats of extreme violence to achieve his ends, which he terms "violent sexual imagery", and couples these with snide sarcasm. His fierce reputation for verbally abusing people became what Deputy Minister of DoSAC Fergus Williams (Geoffrey Streatfeild) referred to as, "a rite of passage" for politicians, to be "Tuckered".

Although he frequently engages in profanity-laden rants, in Season 4, Episode 6, his long monologues during The Goolding Inquiry are almost devoid of such language. On a wider scale, and in spite of this brash, impulsive and volatile persona, he is strongly implied to be more intelligent and adept at long-term thinking than all or most of the other characters.

His constant scheming, although borderline "Malchiavellian" (a portmanteau of "Malcolm" and "Machiavellian") in the words of Hugh Abbot, is paradoxically aimed at a common good, namely the prevalence of the party line and the resolution of issues arising from ministerial incompetence, whereas apparently friendly characters such as Ollie come across as covertly self-serving and egotistical by comparison. He is also implied to be a self-made man of humble origins (Peter Mannion refers to him as the "Gorbals Goebbels", seemingly in reference to his hometown), a firm believer in meritocracy and a staunch opponent of classism and cronyism, such as when he compares the intentions of an MP's daughter to capitalise on her family connections to the practices of the Russian Empire and "the fucking Dimblebys". This probably places him well within the left wing of his own party, which although unnamed is strongly implied to be Labour; at one point aide Jamie even accuses him of being a member of the "Nutters", loosely based on the Gordon Brown faction which heavily contested Blair's Third Way politics.

Accordingly, his demeanour towards working-class characters or anyone deemed a social inferior is sincerely empathetic, gentlemanly and devoid of condescension, as opposed to the obnoxious and patronising behaviour displayed by characters such as Peter Mannion or Stewart Pearson towards hotel receptionists or campaigning youths. The only exception to this behaviour shown is Douglas Tickel, a nurse with mental health problems who becomes a pawn of Tucker's schemes to oust Nicola Murray. The best explanation for this is that the publicity Tickel generated to oppose policies made him fair game in Tucker's eyes. On only two occasions does he show remorse and regret for his actions, the most notable being when he expresses what appears to be genuine remorse towards Glenn after hitting him and breaking his nose. He even feels sorry for Glenn when he has a mini mental breakdown and tries to brighten his mood. His film portrayal, on the other hand, is arguably less sympathetic, and his actions seem less fuelled by ideological persuasion than by an interest to keep his job at all costs.

His reputation precedes him in his own party, amongst the opposition and in the media as shown in newspaper quotes given during The Goolding Inquiry: "Malcolm Tucker has the physical demeanour and the political instincts of a velociraptor" (The Guardian); "Tucker's writ runs through the lifeblood of Westminster like raw alcohol, at once cleansing and corroding" (The Daily Telegraph); "If you make eye contact with Malcolm Tucker, you have spilled his pint" (The Times); and "Iago with a BlackBerry" (The Spectator).

== Character relationships ==
Malcolm is one of four spin doctors featured on the show, the others being Cal Richards (Tom Hollander), Steve Fleming (David Haig), and Stewart Pearson (Vincent Franklin), the latter three of whom make up the three spin doctors that are universally feared by ministers and civil servants alike.

Cal Richards, nicknamed "The Fucker", is arguably the one person in British politics who is even more aggressive and unpredictable, whose excessively cruel and borderline psychopathic persona gives him legendary status within his party; his one on-screen appearance showed him bullying Pearson by pretending to sack him, and indiscriminately shouting torrents of abuse at the Opposition staff. While no on-screen relationship between him and Tucker is ever shown, The Missing DoSAC Files shows them to be very cordial with one another, partaking in occasional games of tennis. In a deleted scene, Malcolm voices his approval of Cal Richard's appointment as the Opposition's media strategist for the upcoming general election, in spite of the trouble posed by the Opposition having a Malcolm-esque spin doctor during such time.

Steve Fleming, while not as feared as Malcolm (mostly due to the fact that, unlike Tucker, he seldom swears), is nonetheless infamous throughout the party for his obsequious, unctuous personality (which is once described by Ollie Reeder as "Obsessive Repulsive Disorder"). He is shown to frequently lose his temper and lash out when faced with any opposition from his co-workers, implying he is mentally unstable. Tucker and Fleming harbour a mutual hatred, going back to when Tucker forced Fleming to resign in 2003 (Tucker's diaries from The Missing DoSAC Files implies this hatred pre-dates this incident). Fleming exacts revenge on Tucker by forcing him to resign by informing the press before telling Malcolm; ironically the same way Tucker had forced Fleming to resign. However, upon his re-instatement by key figures in the party (most notably Julius Nicholson), Tucker exacts revenge on Steve by forcing Nicholson to pass the full blame of a recent scandal to Fleming in his inquiry report, forcing him to resign from his position after less than a week.

Stewart Pearson is equally, if not more, unpleasant than his fellow spin doctors, but not nearly as feared by his party or his opponents. Devoid of morals or competence by comparison, he is a cool, calm man who does not usually raise his voice and hides his intellectual mediocrity behind hip, pseudo-modern political jargon, filled with bizarre buzzwords that no-one understands; Adam Kenyon complains that he "need[s] subtitles" in order to be understood. His petulant disposition, indifference for colleagues' and subordinates' opinions, his "touchy-feely" managing style and his entirely unjustified arrogance make his work colleagues (and Whitehall as a whole) despise him. Malcolm does not shy away from demonstrating his hatred of Stewart, branding him as "utterly fucking contemptible". Despite their mutual hatred, they are on occasion able to come to agreements regarding the public appearance of their respective parties - in Season 3 Episode 5 they agree to refrain from political point scoring in the light of a story concerning donations from a prominent sweatshop labour company to both their political parties being made public.

Tucker has very little patience for the incompetence of ministers and other civil servants in Whitehall to the point where he describes himself in series four as having "no real friends". He considered Hugh Abbot to be bumbling, incompetent and out of touch with the public, and was constantly fed up with having to deal with his mistakes. His treatment of Hugh's successor, Nicola Murray (Rebecca Front), was considerably more sympathetic, with Tucker deeming her a "nice lady", and even helping to advance her rather fanciful policy ideas. However, this professional respect quickly deteriorated following the general election; Nicola's time as Leader of the Opposition was a complete disaster, until Malcolm staged a coup d'état against her, declaring her "a waste of skin". Despite this, he attests at the Goolding Inquiry that he still retained great respect for her as a person and even went so far as to applaud her tenure as Minister of DoSAC.

Despite showing no care for Ollie Reader (Chris Addison), Tucker often uses him in his schemes as he does not doubt his basic skills. Like everyone else, he views Ollie as a "wannabe" Malcolm. He tends to threaten Ollie more than other members of DoSAC like Glenn or Terri, implying he finds Ollie more irritating, probably because Ollie is often responsible for the mistakes Malcolm has to manage. Glenn is possibly the only major character to whom Malcolm shows any (if rare) warmth due to his misfortunes, unwavering loyalty to Hugh Abbot, and the fact he displays more common sense than any of his colleagues. However, Tucker loses all respect for Glenn following his defection, branding him a "traitor" when rebuffing his attempt to re-join Malcolm's party.

The only other person he allows to criticise him without retaliation is fellow Scotsman, Press Officer Jamie McDonald (Paul Higgins), one of the few people who is arguably more aggressive than Malcolm (being referred to as "the crossest man in Scotland" in In the Loop), who is "let off his leash" to do Malcolm's work for him when Malcolm is otherwise unavailable. Despite his capability as Malcolm's enforcer, Jamie is not as adept at strategic thinking as Malcolm, which the latter comes to recognise when Jamie, due to his hatred of prime minister-in-waiting Tom Davis, leaks rumours about Davis' alleged use of antidepressants, despite the best chance of Jamie and Malcolm's careers surviving the transition lying in supporting Davis.

He has a long-standing rivalry with party life peer Julius Nicholson (Alex MacQueen), who delights in his sacking at the end of series 3, but does help him return to power in the next episode. He also has a rivalry with Pat Morrissey. He hates Cliff Lawton (Timothy Bentinck), Hugh's predecessor, who harbours a grudge against Malcolm for forcing him to resign. Cliff hoped to take revenge by becoming prime minister with the help of Jamie McDonald in the special "Spinners and Losers"; this fell apart as soon as Malcolm learnt the identity of Jamie's stalking horse.

He and his personal secretary, Sam, display a genuine affection for one another. He often shouts at her for coffee or to get him on a call with someone, but he is seen speaking fondly of her to Hugh Abbot in Series 2. Despite Tucker's highly vengeful nature, in the immediate aftermath of his own forced resignation at the end of series 3, rather than becoming enraged, he instead tries to reassure Sam and protect her from the men removing him from his office. She is one of the few people who apparently likes Tucker and is visibly upset when he is fired, and she is the only character shown to be amused rather than intimidated or riled by Tucker's acerbic wit. She was present every day at the Goolding Inquiry, her face evolves into visible concern towards the end of the inquiry as she witnesses an end to Malcolm's career.

== Fictional history ==
=== Series 1 ===
In Series 1, Department of Social Affairs (DSA) minister Cliff Lawton is sacked by Malcolm Tucker because of press pressure, though he drafts him a letter of resignation to give him "the chance to say you're jumping before you're pushed". He selects a new minister for DSA, Hugh Abbot. The new minister decides to make his mark by launching an anti-benefit fraud initiative on vague approval from the prime minister without going through the proper procedures. Malcolm makes him scrap the announcement at the last minute to avoid confusion between the prime minister and the Treasury, leaving Abbot with nothing to announce at his scheduled press conference. Later, when the prime minister suddenly approves the initiative, Malcolm successfully spins a story that Hugh did actually make the announcement at the press conference. He then intimidates Ollie Reeder's ex-girlfriend, Angela Heaney, who was the journalist originally assigned to cover the story, into not reporting on the farcical flip-flopping that resulted from dysfunctional communication within government.

Hugh exasperates Malcolm by being out of touch with the common man and popular culture, so he attempts to get him to watch zeitgeist tapes. At the same time, Hugh supports a bad policy on juvenile rehabilitation because of the unanimous approval it receives from focus groups, further worsening his public image. When Malcolm and Hugh mistakenly think Simon Hewitt, a sharp journalistic critic of Hugh, engineered the focus group gaffe because one of the prominent groupees was really an actress, they attempt to intimidate her and get Angela Heaney to publish a tamer version of the story. It however transpires that Hewitt has no relation to the groupee, and, ironically, they have leaked an embarrassing story unnecessarily.

After a housing bill, spearheaded by Hugh and junior minister Dan Miller, that prohibits owning an empty second property passes successfully through parliament, Hugh becomes in the position where he leaves his London flat empty for long stretches of time, so he tries to get around the contradiction by putting the flat on the market but not accepting any offers. When this is discovered by Angela Heaney, an incandescent Malcolm hurries to manage the situation: he gets the flat sold extremely quickly, below market price, but it is already too late. The scandal causes Malcolm to urge Hugh to resign to save the housing bill, explaining that such a resignation would be seen as honourable, but Hugh is very reluctant to do so. After Malcolm reads an upcoming inquiry report that incriminates Hugh badly, he decides to send the message that the government will not "throw a good man out to the wolves over one single little fuck up." Dan Miller ends up resigning to further boost his long-term image and political career, and Hugh remains.

=== Series 2 ===
In Series 2, Hugh Abbot is accosted by a member of the factory he is visiting and he begs Malcolm to bury the story for him. Malcolm has more pressing issues; an important story on a major IT project's overspending and possible corruption on the part of Geoff Holhurst, but he goes to ITN to help Hugh out anyway. He fabricates a story that the seemingly "real person" factory worker is actually standing for a far-right political party; the reporters agree to minimise the story. However, when the Holhurst story breaks at the same time, he decides to send Ollie to shift the focus at ITN away from Holhurst and back to the Hugh story.

With a cabinet reshuffle imminent, Malcolm struggles with a new "blue-sky thinker" special advisor to the prime minister: Julius Nicholson, who is always floating ludicrous government projects and challenging Malcolm's authority. He finds allies in the Department of Social Affairs when Julius removes them from Malcolm's prestigious "8:30 meetings", and devises plans to significantly downsize them in the upcoming reshuffle. He uses Ollie, Glenn Cullen, and Hugh to "leak" rumours that Julius will be named Foreign Secretary in the reshuffle, and then convinces the prime minister that Julius himself is responsible for the rumours as a gambit to guarantee a promotion. The prime minister decides to demote Julius, and Malcolm maintains his position. He rewards his allies by getting them a promotion as "the all-new totally revamped Department of Social Affairs and Citizenship" (DoSAC).

Hugh struggles with his conscience about being forced to support a bill on special educational needs (SEN) he previously objected to because he believes will harm special needs pupils, Glenn's own son being one. Malcolm gets him an education expert friendly to the government position to ease his feelings and to give him something to say to explain his apparent U-turn to the Select Committee. When Hugh accidentally sends an expletive-filled email about Malcolm's expert to a young girl in Reigate instead of Glenn, Malcolm persuades Terri Coverley to take the blame for it as it was sent from her computer. Hugh gets himself in another pickle when he lies to the Select Committee by denying that he met any experts who opposed the bill. Malcolm makes Hugh apologise to the committee and convince them that he really is convinced the bill will help SEN children.

=== "The Rise of the Nutters" 2007 Special ===
In the special "The Rise of the Nutters," Malcolm and his lieutenant Jamie are frustrated by the increasing influence of the "nutters," elements in the government that have unofficially sworn allegiance to the anticipated next prime minister "Tom" after the current PM announces that he will resign within a year. Their attempt to properly prepare a "junior nutter," Ben Swain, for an interview with Jeremy Paxman on the problems in the immigration system fails miserably and he embarrasses himself on television. Malcolm is also enraged that Ollie's girlfriend in the opposition stole Malcolm's idea to have a politician visit an immigration centre to determine the exact problems in the system. These events, along with an ominous comment from Julius Nicholson, lead Malcolm to suspect that the prime minister will depart sooner than expected. Fearing that he will not survive the transition if he is not properly prepared, Tucker tries to leak the prime minister's legacy project to the opposition, thinking it will delay the resignation. In the ensuing confusion, the prime minister decides to scrap the project altogether. Malcolm breathes a sigh of relief but is shocked when this does lead to the prime minister actually resigning much earlier than expected: the very next day.

=== "Spinners and Losers" 2007 Special ===
In the second special, "Spinners and Losers," Malcolm and others struggle to maintain their powers in the chaotic transition. "Nice Nutter Nick", a junior minister, appears to be a clear threat to Malcolm's position. Furious with Malcolm for his involvement in the PM's resignation, Jamie tries to take control himself by leaking a story about Tom's alleged use of antidepressants, causing the prime minister-in-waiting to lose support very rapidly. In the chaos, Malcolm sees an opportunity to regain his influence, and so orchestrates a backup plan suggestion to support Clare Ballentine instead, knowing Nick will claim it as his own idea and that Ballentine will end up refusing the candidature. Malcolm then manipulates Nick into also suggesting Ben Swain, who is soon shot down as well. Finally, Dan Miller, now an extremely influential figure, surfaces and announces that he will back Tom, and that Tom has chosen Malcolm as his media liaison. Malcolm secures his place by convincing Tom of Nick's "betrayals".

=== Series 3 ===
In Series 3, Malcolm scrambles to assign the DoSAC position amidst a reshuffle; when most candidates refuse the job, he is forced to choose Nicola Murray, who is much less politically experienced than he had hoped. Malcolm's background checks discover an apparent conflict of interest with Nicola's husband, who works for a company that was awarded a government PFI contract; combined with Nicola intending to send her daughter to a private secondary school, this guarantees to destroy Nicola's reputation when she has only just started. At the same time, Malcolm has to contend with a by-election in Leamington Spa that might be compromised by the daughter of the previous MP standing as an independent, thus damaging the chances of the party's candidate, Liam Bentley. Malcolm decides to send as many party figures as possible, including Nicola, to support Bentley's election; and, to teach Nicola a lesson about how cruel the press can be to ministers, schemes an embarrassing photograph of her grinning with two thumbs up in front of a large poster that, due to a crop, appears to read "I AM BENT". Upon finding out that on top of Nicola's problems she also has claustrophobia, Malcolm freaks out and calls her an "omnishambles". He forces Nicola to reconcile the conflict of interest by choosing between "fucking up [her] daughter's life and fucking up [her] husband's life", but promises to help her implement her long-term policy ideas on social mobility.

Malcolm tries to improve Nicola's image by taking her to a dinner at The Guardian, but this is compromised when a huge data loss occurs in the immigration database that DoSAC is responsible for. Malcolm is further infuriated when Nicola accidentally speaks of the loss in the presence of a freelance journalist. He makes Nicola call the journalist in and remedy the situation by sacking a scapegoat.

At a party conference in Eastbourne, Malcolm is tipped off by Angela Heaney's enquiries that health statistics that Tom is going to announce in his speech are actually fake numbers lifted from an online blog. Forced to change the speech at the last minute and desperate for any material, he convinces a civilian, Julie, with grievances about a construction negligence scandal originally brought in by Glenn for Nicola's speech, to instead go with the prime minister. When Glenn tries to resist, Malcolm punches him in the nose in the ensuing struggle. After Malcolm apologises, he decides to help Nicola fill the hole he created in her speech. However, the punch story is leaked and surfaces on internet blogs and Malcolm has to send Julie away from the conference to avoid her talking with the press, and he suspects an inept party press officer, John Duggan, is responsible for the leak. He eventually discovers that it was Julie who tweeted about it. When she has had enough of their flip-flops, she insults the party and decides to leave. In retaliation, Malcolm swiftly tricks a blogger into spinning a story that it was actually them who decided to drop her because of her "extremist views", which are actually just that she supports allowing vendors the freedom to use any measuring system.

During a visit from the shadow Social Affairs department, Malcolm tries to keep Murray's daughter's problems at her new school from leaking to the press. He verbally abuses Phil Smith, an Opposition advisor from whom the party obtained the story, into keeping his party from leaking the story, but his efforts are ultimately in vain. However, when the press finds the story too personal to run with, they decide to attack the principal of the school instead, for giving Nicola's daughter special treatment. A distraught and guilty Nicola snaps at Malcolm about the ruthlessly corrupt political bickering she has found herself in, but is eventually convinced by Malcolm to abandon her reservations and embrace the dirty fighting, allowing her to quietly remove her daughter from the school in return.

On Malcolm's 50th birthday, Nicola Murray and her opposite number, Peter Mannion, go head-to-head on BBC Radio 5 Live. Malcom tries to get her to improve her performance by passing instructions to Ollie, but to little avail. Malcolm is forced to go to the studio himself when a caller accuses Mannion's party of receiving donations from a company notorious for unethical labour practices, which also donates a great deal to Malcolm's party. Malcolm is unable to prevent that fact from being broadcast, and when Stewart Pearson tries to capitalise on the leak, the two exchange threats about scandals related to their respective parties. They eventually come to a compromise, both agreeing to refrain from using the donations story for political capital, and decide to abandon Nicola and Peter at the radio station, deeming them "too incompetent" to warrant saving.

When rumours of a leadership challenge from Nicola Murray surface, Malcolm has to drop everything and ensure that the rumours stop spreading, going so far as to put the entire DoSAC building on lockdown. After several of his plans to salvage the situation go awry, Terri calls him out on this in front of the main DoSAC staff, who look on in dread. Instead of unleashing his wrath on Terri, Malcolm confides in her about the immense stress he is currently under trying to keep the party functioning, as well as his political clout starting to ebb, potentially due to the resurfacing of his arch enemy Steve Fleming.

When DoSAC try to get Andy Murray to sponsor their new healthy eating campaign, Malcolm is nowhere to be found. Under the guise of being on holiday, Malcolm invites several of his journalist contacts to what is ostensibly a friendly lunch at his house, where he makes it clear that despite rumours to the contrary, he is still "at the heart of government". Due to a throwaway comment made by one of his journalist contacts, he compels the DoSAC staff to abandon the idea of using a celebrity as their policy sponsor, just as they have confirmed Andy Murray. The resulting kerfuffle is quickly overshadowed by the apparent doctoring of the crime figures, which DoSAC had published at the behest of Steve Fleming, Malcolm's arch nemesis. Malcolm quickly descends onto the scene, and both he and Fleming are forced to deal with the resulting scandal. However, Steve does to Malcolm what Malcolm did to him years before, forcing him to resign over the crime statistics by leaking it to the press before telling him, leaving Malcolm no choice but to do so. As he leaves Downing Street he vows to his comrades, "You will see me again!"

In the Series 3 finale, ministers and civil servants alike have grown tired of Fleming after only a week and realise that Malcolm must return, as they all agree that despite everyone fearing him and enjoying not being abused or threatened by him, Malcolm's work as the party's protecting screen against the media is their only chance at surviving the impending general election. He receives help from long-standing rival Julius Nicholson, who agrees to pardon Malcolm from his alleged wrongdoings in his inquiry report concerning the crime statistics on the condition of Malcolm's return. However, Nicholson is forced to blame it all on Steve Fleming who, due to Malcolm's machinations, is made to look guilty in trying to influence the inquiry report. Malcolm swiftly descends back onto the scene to hand Fleming his resignation letter. He regains his position and gives a foul-mouthed battle speech to ministers and civil servants about the impending election.

=== Series 4 ===
In Series 4 he returns, bored of two years in opposition, working for the new Leader of the Opposition Nicola Murray, who became leader instead of the politically astute Dan Miller on the grounds of "a technicality". Realising that the party would never get back into power with Nicola at the helm, he plots with Ollie Reeder and Dan Miller to overthrow her and install Dan as the Leader of the Opposition.

In episode 4 of Series 4, a front-page headline in which Steve Fleming deemed Nicola Murray "unelectable" prompts Malcolm to launch a concerted attack on Nicola's leadership. When Nicola takes a train to Bradford to spearhead a PR stunt in the hopes of improving her image, Malcolm encourages Ben Swain to resign from his position as Shadow Minister for DoSAC to precipitate the putsch, with the promise that he will re-enter Cabinet as Foreign Secretary. However, Swain accepts Nicola's counteroffer of Shadow Chancellor and reneges on his deal with Malcolm, prompting Dan Miller to offer him the same to ensure that he still resigns. Meanwhile, under Malcolm's orders, Ollie convinces Glenn to leak an old email, in which both Nicola and Ben voiced their approval for the selloff of PFI worker housing that resulted in the suicide of a public sector worker, Nurse Douglas Tickel, who was made homeless as a result. In the ensuing chaos, Malcolm encourages Nicola to call for an inquiry into Tickel's death, knowing that the fallout caused by the leaked email will spell the end of both her's and Ben's political careers. This forces both Nicola and Ben to resign from their positions, allowing Dan Miller to take over as Leader of the Opposition.

After Nicola's resignation, Malcolm makes clear to Nicola in no uncertain terms how little political standing she has, describing her tenure as party leader as a "flatlining non-leadership" and deeming the best thing to come out of it being the inquiry into Tickel's death, which would be fatal for both the government's image and Nicola's political career. However, each party tries to cover their tracks, resulting in the leaking of several humiliating emails in which the Opposition staff make clear their contempt for the deceased Tickel. This prompts the Prime Minister to announce, to everyone's horror, an inquiry into the culture of leaking as well as the death of Tickel.

It is revealed in the inquiry that Malcolm was in possession of Tickel's medical records and National Insurance number after an accidental admission by drawing attention to a photograph that he helped organise to bring down Nicola Murray. Malcolm denies leaking the medical records under oath, making him susceptible to possible perjury charges (in addition to the illegal possession of Tickel's medical records). It is strongly hinted that Malcolm was responsible for the leaking of private details about inquiry member Baroness Sureka when she began to question his bullying tactics. She was absent from the panel for several days because of this. In his final appearance at the Goolding enquiry, he deems the purpose of the inquiry to be pointless, asserting that "the culture of leaking" is an "essential part" of modern political and public arena, and blasts the panel for laying blame for the entire predicament on him, which, in his words, "is the result of a political class, which has given up on morality and simply pursues popularity at all costs."

Upon hearing that the Goolding Inquiry intend to press charges of perjury, Malcolm makes preparations to quietly get arrested at a police station while he sends Dan Miller to attract publicity at another station, to make the government look unresponsive at the police backlog crisis and to divert attention from himself. He gives a final foul-mouthed rant to Ollie, that Ollie calls, "the kind of video that you leave on YouTube after you've blown your brains out," that reveals some personal thoughts and feelings from Malcolm. He insists that Ollie will "never be him" and that he will not survive the job of replacing him. He tells Ollie that he will witness the master of spin go out "with my head held fucking high." Ollie, however, leaks that Malcolm is going to give himself up, and soon the media are waiting for Malcolm outside the station. He and his lawyer try to escape without being seen but are spotted fleeing the station. He asks Ollie to find another station for him, begging that "I need my dignity". When he arrives at the new station the press has been informed that Malcolm will be there. Malcolm looks on as he realises that this is the end. Ollie leaked to the press the new location of Malcolm's arrest. As he prepares to leave the station, his lawyer reads a statement announcing his resignation as Director of Communications, while Malcolm looks on with sadness and bitterness in his eyes. When reporters shout whether he has anything to say, he says he wants to say something but, unable to think of anything to say that could potentially pave the way for a return to politics, simply says, "it doesn't matter". He then boards a waiting taxi and departs the station, and is last seen looking solemnly out of the taxi window, contemplating his future.

== Creation, basis and portrayals in different media ==
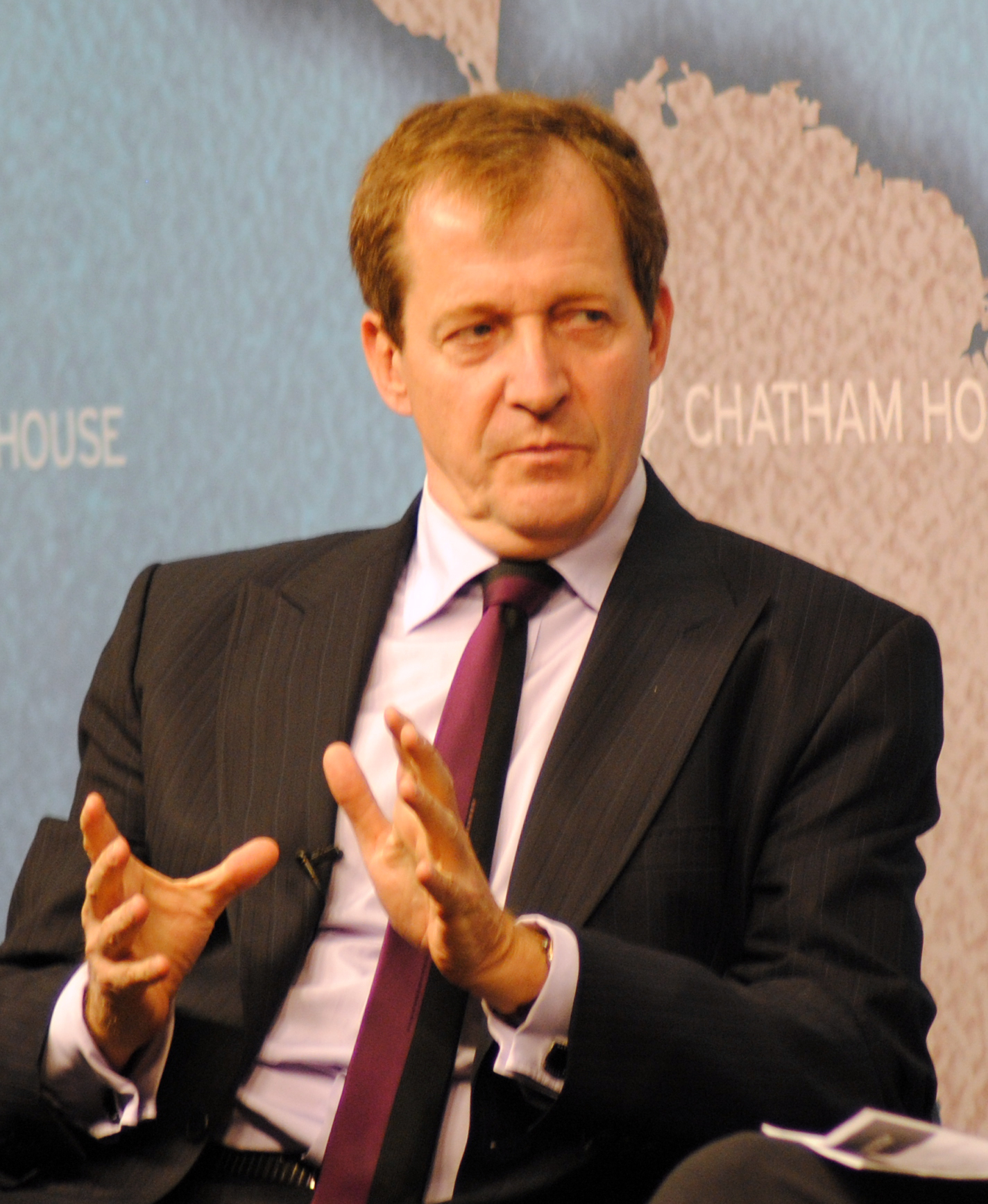
The character was inspired by Tony Blair's spin doctor Alastair Campbell's reputation.

The character is based on several figures, most notably real life Director of Communications for Prime Minister Tony Blair, Alastair Campbell, who admitted to his liberal use of profanities in the workplace. Capaldi later revealed that his personal preferable inspiration for the character was notorious Hollywood producers, most notably Harvey Weinstein.

In the spin off feature film, In the Loop, Tucker, Jamie, Sam and Angela Heaney are the only four characters to return from the TV series. In it, Tucker has to deal with an incompetent minister who has told the press that war is unforeseeable, causing more strain to the hot and delicate topic. Tucker is sent to be a willing and very active pawn in the efforts of a warmongering United States Assistant Secretary of State towards an intervention in the Middle East, which the British Prime Minister and American President want. This he does by fabricating intelligence in what could be a fictionalised version of the so-called Dodgy Dossier issued by Alastair Campbell and used by the British government to justify its involvement in the 2003 invasion of Iraq. Campbell, who said he enjoyed The Thick of It and even found it "hilarious", was vocal in expressing his dislike of the film version.

Two months after the airing of the final episode of series four, Peter Capaldi appeared on GQ magazine's front cover as Malcolm Tucker and recorded a Christmas message to fans. This has so far been the last appearance of the character.

Armando Iannucci stated in 2012 that Series 4 would most likely be the last for The Thick of It, but that it could return for a few specials or something in the future. Following Capaldi's casting as The Doctor in Doctor Who, Iannucci revealed that the show is "definitely over for good". He joked that he has no plans for Tucker to appear in Veep as Tucker is either dead or in prison. However, following Iannucci's exit from the show in 2015 and Capaldi revealing he was set to direct some episodes of the show, he revealed he would be open to appearing again.

Tucker makes an appearance in Alan Moore and Kevin O'Neill's 2012 comic book The League of Extraordinary Gentlemen, Volume III: Century 2009, where he is seen being interviewed by the journalist Jon Snow on television. Iannucci, a friend of Moore's, authorised the use of the character.

The October 2017 edition of The Big Issue, guest-edited by Iannucci, features a debate on Brexit conducted via email between Tucker and another of Iannucci's characters, Alan Partridge.

== Reception ==
For his portrayal of Malcolm Tucker, Peter Capaldi has been lauded by critics and was nominated for the BAFTA award for Best Comedy Performance - Male at the 2006, 2008 and 2013 awards. He won the award for Best Comedy Performance-Male at the 2010 awards. He also won the British Comedy Award for Best Actor in 2010 for his portrayal. He was nominated for the Royal Television Society Award for Best Comedy Performance in 2006.

For his portrayal of Tucker in In the Loop Capaldi was nominated for the British Independent Film Award for Best Actor, the Chicago Film Critics Association Award for Best Supporting Actor and the Evening Standard British Film Awards: Peter Sellers Award for Comedy. He came second place in the International Cinephile Society Award for Best Supporting Actor. He was also nominated for the London Film Critics Circle Award for British Actor of the Year, he came second place in the Los Angeles Film Critics Association Award for Best Supporting Actor, he also came in third place in the New York Film Critics Circle Award for Best Supporting Actor and was nominated for the Online Film Critics Society Award for Best Supporting Actor.

Hana Glasser of American magazine Slate said that, "The character of Tucker is reason enough to elevate The Thick of It over Veep...The brilliant Peter Capaldi, who delivers profanity of the highest imaginable caliber". Empire magazine placed one of Tucker's rants in In the Loop as the 6th greatest movie insults of all time. Alex Fletcher of Digital Spy said, "Malcolm Tucker remains one of the most incredible TV creations of all time". Hollywood actors Brad Pitt and Angelina Jolie are self-confessed fans of Malcolm Tucker and his foul mouthed rants according to Peter Capaldi, who co-starred with Pitt in the 2012 zombie-action film World War Z.

=== Influence on culture ===
In episode 1 of series 3, the word "Omnishambles" was coined by Tucker to describe Nicola Murray. The word was created by Thick of It writer Tony Roche. Following this many notable politicians used the phrase, such as Ed Miliband during Prime Minister's Questions on 18 April 2012 to criticise the Government's 2012 budget. The British media used the phrase to describe US presidential hopeful Mitt Romney upon his UK tour, when he said that he did not believe Britain would be ready for the 2012 Summer Olympics. Due to its adoption by real life politicians, the word was entered into the Oxford English Dictionary on 13 November 2012.

In the run-up to the 2010 general election, the column "Malcolm Tucker's election briefing" appeared weekly in The Guardian, written by Jesse Armstrong.

When Capaldi was cast as the Doctor in Doctor Who, his incarnation of the character shared certain personality traits with Tucker, specifically "a certain acid wit... the attitude, the wisecracks and the energy... he can be edgy, volatile and dangerous".

== See also ==
- Omnishambles
- Selina Meyer
