= Avenue 5 =

2020 sci-fi comedy television series

- Genre: Comedy; Science fiction; Black comedy
- Created by: Armando Iannucci
- Showrunner: Armando Iannucci
- Starring: Hugh Laurie; Josh Gad; Zach Woods; Rebecca Front; Suzy Nakamura; Lenora Crichlow; Nikki Amuka-Bird; Ethan Phillips
- Music by: Adem Ilhan
- Countries of origin: United States; United Kingdom
- Original language: English
- No. of seasons: 2
- No. of episodes: 17

Production
- Executive producers: Kevin Loader; Will Smith; Tony Roche; Simon Blackwell; Armando Iannucci
- Producer: Steve Clark-Hall
- Cinematography: Eben Bolter
- Editor: Gary Dollner
- Running time: 28–29 minutes
- Production company: Dundee Productions

Original release
- Network: HBO (US); Sky One (UK) (season 1); Sky Max (UK) (season 2)
- Release: January 19, 2020 – November 28, 2022

Avenue 5 is a science fiction comedy television series created by Armando Iannucci consisting of two seasons. It starred Hugh Laurie and Josh Gad in lead roles as captain and owner of a fictional interplanetary cruise ship Avenue 5. HBO produced the series in the United States and Sky UK in the United Kingdom. The first season premiered on HBO in the United States on January 19, 2020. The second season was released on October 10, 2022. In February 2023, the series was cancelled.

== Premise ==
On board the interplanetary cruise ship, the Avenue 5, a momentary loss of artificial gravity and accidental death of its chief engineer sends the vessel 0.21 degrees off course. It is estimated it will take the ship three years to return to Earth, and with only enough supplies to sustain her many passengers for the intended eight-week long cruise, the crew of the Avenue 5 must struggle to maintain order and return the craft safely.

Armando Iannucci described the train of thought behind Avenue 5 during an interview in Vanity Fair:

I wanted to look at society. I wanted to look at group think, I wanted to get away from politics and look at just behavior. I've always been a huge fan of sci-fi. I always used to read H. G. Wells and [Isaac] Asimov. I always used to buy all the Marvel comics. The best sci-fi is really not about magic and aliens, it's about today. It's just taking something from today and cranking it up a bit. I loved the reboot of Battlestar Galactica. It's really about politics and power dynamics and discrimination, and all sorts of things going on there with the Cylons, and terrorism, as well. I thought, "Let's do something like that." Very quickly we came up with this idea of a space cruise that is stuck for eight years.

— Armando Iannucci

== Cast and characters ==
=== Main ===
- Hugh Laurie as Ryan Clark, the captain of the Avenue 5
- Josh Gad as Herman Judd, billionaire owner of the Avenue 5
- Zach Woods as Matt Spencer, Head of Customer Relations for the Avenue 5
- Rebecca Front as Karen Kelly, a passenger aboard the Avenue 5
- Suzy Nakamura as Iris Kimura, an associate owner of the Avenue 5
- Lenora Crichlow as Billie McEvoy, second engineer on the Avenue 5
- Nikki Amuka-Bird as Rav Mulcair, head of mission control for the Avenue 5 back on Earth, later (episode 8 onward) is onboard the Avenue 5
- Ethan Phillips as Spike Martin, a former astronaut and first (or fifth) Canadian on Mars, who is now a womanizing alcoholic on the Avenue 5

=== Recurring ===
- Himesh Patel as Jordan Hatwal (season 1), a stand-up comedian who takes up an eight-week residency on the Avenue 5
- Jessica St. Clair as Mia, a passenger and Doug's wife
- Kyle Bornheimer as Doug, a passenger and Mia's husband
- Andy Buckley as Frank, a passenger and Karen's husband
- Matthew Beard as Alan Lewis, Rav's assistant on Earth
- Daisy May Cooper as Sarah (season 1), bridge crew; Zarah (season 2), Sarah's twin sister and an actress on Earth
- Adam Pålsson as Mads, bridge crew
- Julie Dray as Nadia (season 1), bridge crew
- Neil Casey as Cyrus (season 1), an engineer
- Paterson Joseph as Harrison Ames (season 1), a rival of Judd's
- Kelly Coughlin as Jaden
- John Finnemore as Paul, the shuttle pilot
- Priyanga Burford as Lori Hernandez
- Vaughn Johseph as John
- Joseph Balderrama as Tim
- Wanda Opalinska as Bailey
- Rae Lim as Devon
- Rachel Handshaw as Teri (season 1)
- Justin Edwards as Nathan Basic (season 2), the cannibal
- Lucy Punch as Dawn Djopi (season 2), a talk-show host
- Arsher Ali as Lucas Sato (season 2), a representative from the Office of the Other President
- Leila Farzad as Elena (season 2), Clark's girlfriend and Charles' estranged wife
- Jonathan Aris as Charles (season 2), Elena's estranged husband
- Julian Ovenden as Ryan (season 2)
- David Fynn as Judd (season 2)
- Julianna Kurokawa as Iris (season 2)
- Imogen Woods as Paloma (season 2)
- A. J. Parkes as Rafael (season 2)

== Episodes ==
=== Series overview ===
| Season | Episodes | Originally released | |
| Season | Episodes | First released | Last released |
|---|---|---|---|
| 1 | 9 | January 19, 2020 | March 15, 2020 |
| 2 | 8 | October 10, 2022 | November 28, 2022 |

=== Season 1 (2020) ===
| No. overall | No. in season | Title | Directed by | Written by | Original release date | U.S viewers (millions) |
|---|---|---|---|---|---|---|
| 1 | 1 | "I Was Flying" | Armando Iannucci | Teleplay by : Armando Iannucci & Simon Blackwell & Tony Roche; Story by : Armando Iannucci | January 19, 2020 | 0.571 |
Luxurious passenger spaceship Avenue 5, owned by eccentric billionaire Herman Judd, is on an eight-week trip through the Solar System when a course malfunction means it will now take three years to get home. After the main engineer is killed, Captain Ryan Clark is found to have been hired as a reassuring figurehead for the automated ship. The deceased engineer was the actual pilot. Passenger service employee Matt Spencer attempts to calm the passengers.
| 2 | 2 | "And Then He's Gonna Shoot Off..." | Natalie Bailey | Teleplay by : Georgia Pritchett & Will Smith; Story by : Armando Iannucci & Georgia Pritchett & Will Smith | January 26, 2020 | 0.500 |
Cyrus finds the trip duration could be reduced to six months by jetisoning some passengers or crew. On Earth, Judd meets with NASA. Joe's coffin is jettisoned. Another gravity mishap interrupts a funeral for three passengers who died in the first gravity mishap. The four coffins orbit the ship.
| 3 | 3 | "I'm a Hand Model" | Natalie Bailey | Teleplay by : Ian Martin & Peter Fellows; Story by : Armando Iannucci & Ian Martin & Peter Fellows | February 2, 2020 (Note: The episode was first made available on January 31, 2020, through HBO's digital platform.) | 0.297 |
The crew struggles to adjust to their new arrival time of three-and-a-half years. Clark discovers the crew are as false as he is; they are actors and models, and the bridge is no more than a stage. Billie reveals the existence of two crews, one for show matching Judd's wish for his ship to be crewed by the most attractive, and another to actually pilot the ship 'backstage'.
| 4 | 4 | "Then Who Was That on the Ladder?" | Natalie Bailey | Teleplay by : Ian Martin & Peter Fellows; Story by : Armando Iannucci & Ian Martin & Peter Fellows | February 9, 2020 | 0.275 |
Realizing he will have to keep up the charade for longer than anticipated, Clark contemplates studying the spacecraft and has Billie introduce him to the actual crew. The distraction from their duties has disastrous consequences. Clark has to go on a spacewalk to conduct an emergency repair on the ship's 'wetsuit', a sewage-filled compartment which is the ship's radiation shield.
| 5 | 5 | "He's Only There to Stop His Skeleton from Falling Over" | Annie Griffin | Teleplay by : Peter Baynham; Story by : Armando Iannucci & Peter Baynham | February 16, 2020 | 0.386 |
The ship is saved by Billie, who is annoyed that Clark is declared the hero. Clark's perceived recklessness results in the breakdown of his trilateral marriage. The initial accident is blamed on Frank, who suspects the captain is trying to seduce his wife. The rest of the passengers and crew celebrate what should have been the voyage's half-way point.
| 6 | 6 | "Was It Your Ears?" | Peter Fellows | Teleplay by : Jon Brown; Story by : Armando Iannucci & Jon Brown | February 23, 2020 | 0.371 |
A woman gives birth and her baby causes Judd to have an identity crisis. Billie and Clark realize a mysterious beeping might be a warning that the ship is leaking oxygen. On Earth, Rav tries to secure government funds for a rescue mission.
| 7 | 7 | "Are You a Spider, Matt?" | Becky Martin | Teleplay by : Charlie Cooper & Daisy Cooper; Story by : Armando Iannucci & Charlie Cooper & Daisy Cooper | March 1, 2020 | 0.400 |
Frank sees an image of Pope John Paul II in the debris orbiting the ship. Trillionaire passenger Harrison threatens to sue Judd, compromising a potential rescue. On Earth, the public becomes aware that Rav's negotiation for rescue funds potentially puts lives on the line.
| 8 | 8 | "This is Physically Hurting Me" | David Schneider | Teleplay by : Georgia Pritchett & Will Smith; Story by : Armando Iannucci & Georgia Pritchett & Will Smith | March 8, 2020 | 0.384 |
Clark is de-captained in an argument with Judd. After Clark accidentally reveals to the passengers that he isn't American and is wearing a toupee, they question whether their situation is real or if they are in a prank reality show. Harrison and six others self-eject through the airlock in the belief they will end up back on Earth. Rav realizes that the rescue craft having just two seats means she must either leave Judd aboard Avenue 5 or take his place for the duration.
| 9 | 9 | "Eight Arms But No Hands" | William Stefan Smith | Teleplay by : Ian Martin & Peter Fellows and Sean Gray; Story by : Armando Iannucci & Sean Gray and Ian Martin & Peter Fellows | March 15, 2020 | 0.415 |
Guilt-ridden over the deaths of the airlock seven, Matt decides to hide for the duration and changes the airlock codes. The crew search for him, to shorten the journey to six months by jettisoning unnecessary objects to the equivalent weight of 500 people. When found Matt reveals the code, but due to a misunderstanding the objects are jettisoned from the portside instead of the rear, extending their journey time to eight years. After squabbling over the supply shuttle's second seat, Iris is accidentally sent back to Earth early leaving Rav aboard.

=== Season 2 (2022) ===
| No. overall | No. in season | Title | Directed by | Written by | Original release date | U.S viewers (millions) |
|---|---|---|---|---|---|---|
| 10 | 1 | "No One Wants an Argument About Reality" | William Stefan Smith | Teleplay by : Will Smith; Story by : Armando Iannucci & Will Smith | October 10, 2022 | N/A |
Five months after the jettisoning incident, Clark has still not told the passengers that their return to Earth has been delayed by eight years, and has found out that his new girlfriend Elena's estranged husband Charles is onboard. Rav unveils to the ship's board her plan to save half of Avenue 5's population by sealing the other half below deck to either grow their own food or starve, which is rejected. Frank has gained celebrity status for his cooking show in which he uses hotel amenities, and has kept Karen in their room after telling her that the other passengers know that she was responsible for the jettisoning mistake. Judd Mission Control is taken over by the Office of the Other President. And, after Spike takes Elena's kids on a tour of the real bridge, Avenue 5 is set on a new course that will bring it dangerously close to the Sun. Back on Earth, the events on Avenue 5 are dramatised in a new television drama, and Iris fails to raise awareness and money for a rescue mission.
| 11 | 2 | "What an Unseasonal Delight" | William Stefan Smith | Teleplay by : Keith Akushie; Story by : Armando Iannucci & Keith Akushie | October 17, 2022 | N/A |
With Avenue 5 bound on course to come dangerously close to the Sun, the crew decide to evacuate everyone to the half of the ship facing away from it. With the extreme heat likely to kill Avenue 5's stock of live eels (the ship's chief source of food), the crew are forced to evacuate them too by the bucketload. The crew manage to locate a service tunnel that is twelve degrees cooler than the rest of the ship and can accommodate three hundred people, although the crew agonise over who should be granted entry. Mia, now heavily pregnant, reveals to Doug that Mads may be the father. Back on Earth, Iris purchases the production company that produces the Avenue 5 drama series and casts Sarah's twin sister Zarah as the ship's scientific officer and series' new lead to boost popular support for a rescue mission.
| 12 | 3 | "Is It a Good Dot?" | David Schneider | Teleplay by : Jon Brown; Story by : Armando Iannucci & Jon Brown | October 24, 2022 | N/A |
The eels start dying off one by one due to faults with their storage tank. The crew of Avenue 5 decide to solicit help from the Stormfalcon space station, whose crew are fans of the Avenue 5 series. They later learn that Stormfalcon is not a military-sponsored scientific outpost but a prison, with its crew comprising criminals considered too violent to be incarcerated on Earth. With the eel tank still in need of repair, the Avenue 5 crew reluctantly ask for help from Stormfalcon's chief engineer, a paedophile, but keep him isolated from the passengers via a system reminiscent of a hamster ball and force him back onto the Stormfalcon just as a riot breaks out. Unfortunately, Nathan Basic, a cannibal, is still on the ship after being invited to appear on Frank's cooking show. Judd is furious that his role in the Avenue 5 television series is reduced to that of a background character who agrees with everyone. On Earth, Lucas Sato, the new head of Judd Mission Control under secondment from The Other President's Office, reveals to Iris top secret knowledge that Earth is facing a lithium shortage. Hoping to use this to leverage support for a rescue mission, Iris returns to Avenue 5 via a supply shuttle.
| 13 | 4 | "How It Ends: As a Starter and a Main" | Annie Griffin | Teleplay by : John Finnemore; Story by : Armando Iannucci & John Finnemore | October 31, 2022 | N/A |
With cannibal Nathan Basic still onboard Avenue 5, Clark orders the ship locked down but Rav accidentally reveals to the passengers the cannibal's presence, believing that she had turned off the public address system. In lockdown, Doug's leg is trapped in an airlock door and is nursed by Paul the shuttle pilot; Karen, who knows what Basic looks like and that he is not locked in the same room as her, attempts to satisfy her need to take control by leading efforts to work out who the cannibal is but is overshadowed by Isaac; Iris and Judd try to use the lithium shortage to leverage a rescue mission, and Mads is forced to sign a non-disclosure agreement due to his and Judd's new friendship; and Matt, Mia, Elena and her daughter, who are unknowingly locked in the same room as Basic, engage in group therapy to pass the time. Frank, who had been pinned down by other attendants at the ship's spa on suspicion that he was the cannibal, helps Clark and Billie identify Basic. However, after Basic expressed regret about his past behaviour, the rest of the therapy group object to his arrest. Clark, Billie and Rav accidentally reveal the true direness of Avenue 5's situation due to the public address system being left on, and Judd destroys his leverage by having the lithium shortage be revealed through dialogue in the Avenue 5 drama series.
| 14 | 5 | "Let's Play with Matches" | Annie Griffin | Teleplay by : Tony Roche & Rose Heiney; Story by : Armando Iannucci & Tony Roche & Rose Heiney | November 7, 2022 | N/A |
When rioting breaks out onboard Avenue 5 and the passengers are about to kill Clark, Isaac suggests that he be peacefully replaced with a 'citizen's assembly'. Clark accepts his overthrow with relief, and he and Judd are detained. However, the new governing committees have little rationale (with Billie being barred from the engineering committee and Basic becoming a leading member of the food committee) and spend much of their time in heated argument. After Elena and Charles rescue him, Clark calls for the election of a 'benign dictator' to bring order. The candidates up for election include Isaac, Frank (albeit as a puppet of Karen), Iris, Rav, Matt (who is running on nihilistic honesty and crossbow-making lessons), Mads (albeit as a puppet of Judd), Billie, Basic, and Clark's character from the Avenue 5 television series (as a joke or protest candidate). Fearing the likely prospect of Basic winning (due to his amiable personality and inspired policies), Clark, Spike, Elena and Charles support, in succession, Billie (whose popularity drops instantly when she berates voters' poor understanding of physics), Karen (who is instantly booed off stage), and a crestfallen Isaac. However, after being endorsed by Isaac, Clark finds himself elected as the new dictator after the passengers overwhelmingly vote for 'TV Ryan' and forcefully make him up to look more like the television character. On Earth, Sato meets with the Other President (a committee comprising the CEOs of Amazon, Tesla and Reality Whack, the successor company to Meta) to discuss the lithium shortage. To Sato's horror, they suggest destroying Avenue 5 to distract from the story.
| 15 | 6 | "Intoxicating Clarity" | Ollie Parsons | Teleplay by : Georgia Pritchett and Ian Martin & Marina Hyde; Story by : Armando Iannucci & Georgia Pritchett and Ian Martin & Marina Hyde | November 14, 2022 | N/A |
As Clark attempts to establish himself as a benevolent ruler, he tasks Billie with supervising Judd to ensure that he calls Sato to arrange a rescue mission and does not antagonise him, and Iris tries to persuade him to create a secret police. Matt has established a resistance movement against Clark. The once-supportive passengers begin to fear Clark after Zarah dies on the set of the Avenue 5 television series following Clark's offhanded comments disparaging her, and Matt is harmfully crushed at the ship's new cuddle club. Although Clark and Matt reconcile, Matt is shot with a crossbow during a photo-op; Mads reveals that he ordered the attacks on him to further Matt's revolutionary cause. After the discovery of a meteor rich in lithium ore, Judd attempts to use it as leverage for a rescue mission, but is informed that the missile cannot be recalled. At a cosplay watch party, the passengers learn about the impending missile strike from the season finale of Avenue 5, forcing Clark to authorise the detention of the "usual panickers" by the secret police (established by Iris despite Clark's objections).
| 16 | 7 | "I Love Judging People" | David Schneider | Teleplay by : Sean Gray; Story by : Armando Iannucci & Sean Gray | November 21, 2022 | N/A |
Judd tells the board that, for tax purposes, Avenue 5 can be split in two. However, it is likely that the missile will hit whichever half the passengers and crew fully evacuate into. Not wanting to decide who lives and dies, they assign the task to an AI which allocates worth based on numerous factors and determines a corresponding numerical rank; those ranking between 1 and 3000 will be moved to the front half and safety, and those ranking 3001 and lower will be left in the back half, as the missile will attempt to inflict maximum damage by hitting the engines. In the time before the split, passengers and crew attempt to boost their rankings. Over dinner, Clark is forced to tell Elena and Charles about the true purpose of the ranking system (after being penalised for lying), and Elena tells Clark and Charles that she loves them both. Billie is dismayed that she ranks second rather than first, until learning that Mads is first only because the AI recognises only his positive tone and not what he is saying. Spike's attempt to boost his rank through stand-up comedy fails as some passengers were offended by his jokes. Matt attempts to help Rav overcome her anxiety to boost her rank. Iris tries to cheat through strategic smiling until the AI learns about and discounts it; she manages to boost her rank by delivering Mia's baby. Judd, after offering rank-boosting advice, learns that he is in the lower-ranking half. Karen, after learning that Clark hates her, disguises herself as him to sabotage his ranking; after Clark apologises to her, it is discovered that insulting or assaulting someone then immediately apologising for it can be used to cheat the system. The final division sees Clark attempt to sacrifice himself to save Elena, and Billie opt to stay at the back. However, after Judd reveals the truth and leads some of the passengers to the front half of the ship, Billie surmises that the new division of passengers may result in the front half being the one hit by the missile.
| 17 | 8 | "That's Why They Call It a Missile" | Armando Iannucci | Teleplay by : Simon Blackwell & Rose Heiney; Story by : Armando Iannucci & Simon Blackwell & Rose Heiney | November 28, 2022 | N/A |
Following the split, Judd, Iris, Rav, Matt, Mads, Doug and Mia's baby are in the front half, whilst Clark, Billie, Spike, Frank, Karen, Mia and Basic are in the back half. With supplies and facilities split between both halves, the back half has all of Avenue 5's engineers whilst the front half has the eel tank and control over all systems but is at greater risk of being hit by the missile. Spike, after revealing that he only has three weeks left to live, offers to sacrifice himself to save the ship. Elena wishes to marry both Clark and Charles before the missile strikes, but Clark ends up marrying Charles (and possibly Karen) after Elena's video link is cut off by Rav, hoping that the missile will miss the blacked-out front half. After Spike learns that he was misdiagnosed and is healthy, he reneges on his mission; however, by steering his escape pod out of the path of the missile, he deflects it away from either half of Avenue 5, but causes it to hit the meteor instead. After learning that they are saved, Matt and Rav share a passionate kiss and the passengers in the front half turn on Judd. Using a minute fragment, Clark and Billie use it in a perspective illusion to trick Sato into greenlighting a rescue mission.

== Production ==
=== Development ===
On September 25, 2017, it was announced that HBO had given a pilot order to a new comedy series created by Armando Iannucci, who was also set to serve as writer and executive producer. In addition to the pilot order, the network also reportedly ordered backup scripts. In April 2019, a series pickup was commissioned by HBO for nine episodes. On February 13, 2020, the series was renewed for a second season, which would also consist of nine episodes. In October 2022, Iannucci told Entertainment Weekly that there are plans for a third season, saying that HBO was "very keen". On February 10, 2023, HBO canceled the series after two seasons.

=== Casting ===
In August 2018, it was announced that Hugh Laurie and Suzy Nakamura had been cast in the pilot's lead roles as Captain Ryan Clark and Iris Kimura. On November 7, 2018, it was reported that Rebecca Front had joined the pilot's cast in another leading role as Karen Kelly. In February 2019, Zach Woods, Josh Gad, Nikki Amuka-Bird and Lenora Crichlow were cast as series regulars Matt Spencer, Herman Judd, Rav Mulclair, and Billie McEvoy. Himesh Patel was added in June as comedian on the ship, Jordan Hatwal. The main cast members were returned for the second season by the time of its announcement.

=== Writing ===
By July 2021, the first six episodes of the second season were plotted out, leaving only the final three to be outlined "next month". Iannucci added: "It's basically about people in isolation. So, we're just waiting to see what the mood might be as to how we pitch. Is it going to be bleak despair, or is it going to be very, very silly? Or maybe silly despair? I don't know. We tried to make season one as silly as possible, but it seems to have strangely become a kind of documentary about present-day conditions."

=== Filming ===
Principal photography for the pilot took place in 2018 in London, England. While filming was taking place at Warner Bros. Studios, Leavesden in July 2019, a fire damaged one of the show's sets. Production for the second season was halted due to the COVID-19 pandemic; filming ultimately began in August 2021 and ended in November.

== Release ==
The series premiered on January 19, 2020, on HBO. In New Zealand, the series is distributed by Sky satellite television provider's SOHO2 channel and Neon streaming service. The second season premiered on October 10, 2022, on HBO.

== Reception ==
=== Critical response ===
On Rotten Tomatoes, the first season has an approval rating of 67% based on 52 reviews, with an average rating of 6.3/10. The website's critical consensus states: "If Avenue 5's maiden voyage isn't as smooth as its creative clout implies, it's still a hilarious step in a completely new—while still enjoyably caustic—direction for creator Armando Iannucci." On Metacritic, it has a weighted average score of 64 out of 100, based on 28 critics, indicating "generally favorable reviews". On Rotten Tomatoes, the second season has an approval rating of 89% based on 9 reviews, with an average rating of 7.4/10.

=== Ratings ===
Viewership and ratings per episode of Avenue 5
| No. | Title | Air date | Rating (18–49) | Viewers (millions) | DVR (18–49) | DVR viewers (millions) | Total (18–49) | Total viewers (millions) |
|---|---|---|---|---|---|---|---|---|
| 1 | "I Was Flying" | January 19, 2020 | 0.2 | 0.571 | —N/a | 0.296 | —N/a | 0.867 |
| 2 | "And Then He's Gonna Shoot Off..." | January 26, 2020 | 0.1 | 0.500 | 0.1 | 0.385 | 0.2 | 0.885 |
| 3 | "I'm a Hand Model" | February 2, 2020 | 0.1 | 0.297 | 0.1 | 0.358 | 0.2 | 0.655 |
| 4 | "Wait a Minute, Then Who Was That on the Ladder?" | February 9, 2020 | 0.1 | 0.275 | 0.1 | 0.347 | 0.2 | 0.622 |
| 5 | "He's Only There to Stop His Skeleton from Falling Over" | February 16, 2020 | 0.1 | 0.386 | 0.1 | 0.292 | 0.2 | 0.678 |
| 6 | "Was It Your Ears?" | February 23, 2020 | 0.1 | 0.371 | 0.1 | 0.302 | 0.2 | 0.673 |
| 7 | "Are You a Spider, Matt?" | March 1, 2020 | 0.1 | 0.400 | 0.1 | 0.336 | 0.2 | 0.736 |
| 8 | "This is Physically Hurting Me" | March 8, 2020 | 0.1 | 0.384 | —N/a | —N/a | —N/a | —N/a |
| 9 | "Eight Arms But No Hands" | March 15, 2020 | 0.1 | 0.415 | 0.1 | 0.236 | 0.2 | 0.651 |
