= Gash (TV series) =

British television series

Gash is a satirical British television comedy created by Armando Iannucci that was broadcast each weeknight from Monday 28 April to Thursday 1 May 2003 on Channel 4 to coincide with the 2003 local elections. Written and filmed on the day of transmission, the programme was a topical review show featuring sketches, modified VT footage, talk, discussion and jokes. The name derives from a television term for footage surplus to requirements. The show featured appearances from Olivia Colman, Dominic Holland, Jon Holmes and John Oliver, amongst others.

Many of the writers of the show – Simon Blackwell, Roger Drew, Tony Roche and Will Smith – went on to collaborate with Iannucci on the political sitcom The Thick of It (2005–2012) and Time Trumpet (2006). Other writers included Dan Tetsell, Danny Robins and Jon Holmes. Perhaps due to its topical nature, the series is not available on any commercial media formats or even via 4oD. It was produced by David Tyler and was a Talkback (production company) production in association with Pozzitive Television.
