= Sean Gray =

British comedy writer, producer and director

- Born: 15 June 1983 (age 43)
- Education: Oxford University
- Occupations: screenwriter, director, producer
- Writing career
- Genres: TV, Film and radio comedy

Sean Gray (born 15 June 1983) is a British comedy writer, producer and director. He is known for his work on the Spy Thriller Slow Horses, HBO series Veep, the BAFTA-winning BBC series The Thick of It and Stewart Lee's Comedy Vehicle and the feature film The Day Shall Come. He is a two-time Emmy-winner and Golden Globe-nominee.

== Early life and education ==
Gray graduated from Oxford University. During his time at Oxford he wrote for and edited the university magazine Isis, and has explained that this "was basically just an excuse to write funny stuff for an audience". Gray started writing comedy sketches as a student and has cited Peter Cook as the comedian who "opened [his] eyes to what comedy could be".

== Television and radio ==
Gray began his career in 2006 writing on the Armando Iannucci BBC2 comedy series Time Trumpet. He worked as Assistant Producer on Series 1 of Stewart Lee's Comedy Vehicle, and wrote for the red button "Stewart V Armando" interview segments with Iannucci. He worked on the BBC comedy The Thick of It, writing or co-writing 14 episodes. For the launch of Series 4, he and fellow The Thick of It writer Ian Martin were interviewed by Kirsty Lang for BBC Radio 4's Front Row, and described how the show's seemingly farcical policies had often been mirrored in real life. Gray also wrote on this subject for the BBC News website.

He is a writer and Co-Executive Producer on HBO's Emmy-winning sitcom Veep, starring Julia Louis-Dreyfus. The show and Gray won the Outstanding Comedy Series at both the 67th Primetime Emmy Awards and the 68th Primetime Emmy Awards, two Writers Guild Of America Awards and a 2016 Peabody Award. He is a credited writer on 9 episodes of Veep: "Catherine" and "Chung" (Season 1); "Hostages" and "Running" (Season 2); "Some New Beginnings" and "Alicia" (Season 3); "Convention" and "Testimony" (Season 4); and "Thanksgiving" (Season 5).

He is creator and sole writer of iGod, a Radio 4 science fiction comedy series starring David Soul and Simon Day about a man who accidentally causes the end of the world. The show was described by The Guardian as "very, very funny", and by the Radio Times as "hilarious". He has also written for three series of Armando Iannucci's Charm Offensive and David Quantick's One.

== Film ==
Gray directed Peter Capaldi in the award-winning short film Bistro, which he also wrote and produced. The film co-stars Alex Macqueen and won Soho House's international "Electric Shorts" competition.

While working on the Oscar-nominated film In the Loop, he and Iannucci reportedly managed to get into the US State Department using their BBC passes, prompting acting spokesman Robert Wood to later issue a statement, and the State Department to conduct "a complete review of their security procedures".

He wrote for the 2019 black comedy thriller The Day Shall Come alongside director Chris Morris and Jesse Armstrong. He had previously collaborated with Morris on the Season 3 Veep episode "Alicia".

He is currently developing "a comedy about artificial intelligence" for Armando Iannucci to direct. He contributed additional material to the satire Greed for director Michael Winterbottom, starring Steve Coogan.

== Credits ==
- Slow Horses Writer
- The Great Consulting Producer
- Avenue 5 Co-Executive Producer, Writer
- The Day Shall Come (additional material)
- Veep (Writer, 9 episodes, Co-Executive producer)
- The Thick of It (Writer, 14 episodes)
- Time Trumpet (Writer)
- Stewart Lee's Comedy Vehicle (writer, additional material Series 2; Assistant Producer, writer 6 episodes of "Comedy Extra" segments on red button Series 1)
- iGod on BBC Radio 4 (creator, writer 2010–2011)
- Bistro (writer, director, producer)
- Armando Iannucci's Charm Offensive on BBC Radio 4
- In the Loop
