= Adam Tandy =

British television producer

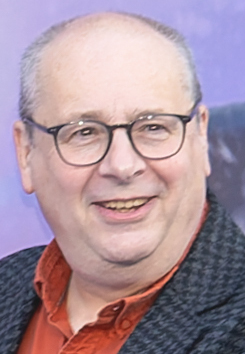
- Tandy at the 2024 BFI London Film Festival premiere of That Christmas
- Occupation: Television producer and director

Adam Tandy is a British television producer and director known for his collaborations with Armando Iannucci.

== Early life ==
Tandy attended Latymer Upper School (Class of 1981). He started studying electrical engineering at university, but dropped out before graduation.

== Career ==
After initially working in theatre, Tandy worked at the BBC from 1987, starting as a floor manager. He left the BBC to work as a freelance producer in 1999.

Tandy has worked on The Saturday Night Armistice, The Armando Iannucci Shows, Time Trumpet and The Thick of It. In 2009, he produced the Thick of It feature film adaptation In the Loop. After the 2012 series of The Thick of It, he has produced Catastrophe for Channel 4, as well as Inside No. 9, Come Fly with Me and Detectorists for the BBC.
