= The Thick of It =

British comedy television series (2005–2012)

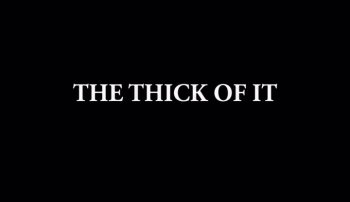
- Genre: Black comedy; Political satire; Cringe comedy
- Created by: Armando Iannucci
- Showrunner: Armando Iannucci
- Written by: Jesse Armstrong; Armando Iannucci; Simon Blackwell; Tony Roche; Roger Drew; Will Smith; Sean Gray; Ian Martin; David Quantick; Dan Gaster; Georgia Pritchett
- Directed by: Armando Iannucci; Natalie Bailey; Billy Sneddon; Becky Martin; Chris Addison; Tony Roche
- Starring: Peter Capaldi; Chris Langham; Rebecca Front; Chris Addison; Joanna Scanlan; James Smith; Polly Kemp; Roger Allam; Vincent Franklin; Olivia Poulet; Will Smith; Ben Willbond; Geoffrey Streatfeild
- Country of origin: United Kingdom
- Original language: English
- No. of series: 4
- No. of episodes: 23 (list of episodes)

Production
- Executive producers: Jon Plowman (s. 1–2); Armando Iannucci (s. 3); Andy Forssell (s. 4)
- Producers: Adam Tandy; Armando Iannucci (s. 4)
- Editors: Ant Boys; Billy Sneddon
- Running time: 29 minutes
- Production company: BBC

Original release
- Network: BBC Four (s. 1–2); BBC Two/BBC HD (s. 3–4) (UK)
- Release: 19 May 2005 – 27 October 2012

Related
- In the Loop; Veep

The Thick of It is a British comedy television series created, co-written and directed by Armando Iannucci that satirises the inner workings of British government. It was first broadcast for two short series on BBC Four in 2005, initially with a small cast focusing on a government minister, his advisers and their party's spin doctor. The cast was significantly expanded for two hour-long specials to coincide with Christmas and Gordon Brown's appointment as prime minister in 2007, which saw new characters forming the opposition party added to the cast. These characters continued when the show switched channels to BBC Two for its third series in 2009. A fourth series about a coalition government was broadcast in 2012, with the last episode transmitted on 27 October 2012.

The series has been described as the 21st century's answer to Yes Minister. It highlights the struggles and conflicts between politicians, party spin doctors, advisers, civil servants and the media. In similar fashion to Yes Minister, the political parties involved are never mentioned by name, and in series 1 and 2 most policies discussed are fairly generic and non-ideological. Iannucci describes it as "Yes Minister meets Larry Sanders". Journalist and former civil servant Martin Sixsmith was an adviser to the writing team, adding to the realism of some scenes. The series became well known for its profanity and for featuring storylines which have mirrored, or in some cases foreshadowed, real-life policies, events or scandals.

A feature film spin-off, In the Loop, was released in the UK on 17 April 2009. Sony Pictures produced a remake of the show for the United States piloted on ABC but was unsuccessful. Iannucci was subsequently invited to create Veep for HBO, a programme with a very similar tone and political issues, with the involvement of some The Thick of It writers and production members.

== Production ==
=== Planning ===
Armando Iannucci originally conceived of a modern political satire after "arguing the case" for Yes Minister in a documentary made for a 2004 Best British Sitcom poll for BBC Two. After re-watching the whole run of the older sitcom, he realised that whilst many of the political issues it discussed were still relevant, political dynamics had changed, with ministers' ability to act being constrained less by resistance from the Civil Service than by pressure from 10 Downing Street to hew closely to a centrally set agenda. Iannucci conducted background research by speaking with policy makers and political journalists, and was struck by the extent to which responsibility was being placed in the hands of recently graduated special advisers: "Cabinet ministers were bringing in these junior spads because they thought they were so clever and bright but actually they were just confident. They'd never fixed a car or bought a house or really done anything complicated".

His idea was commissioned by Roly Keating, the controller of BBC Four, who granted Iannucci a limited budget of £100,000, telling him to "turn that into what you can." Iannucci subsequently said that the small budget turned out to be a positive, forcing an experimental approach to producing the show. Iannucci created the first series of three episodes, which aired in May–June 2005, and a second series, also of three episodes, which followed in October.

=== Writing ===
The series was written by a team of writers led by Iannucci, who also directed the series, with Jesse Armstrong, Simon Blackwell, Roger Drew, Sean Gray, Ian Martin, Will Smith and Tony Roche. Some of the dialogue was improvised rather than scripted (with the cast credited as providing "additional material"), and included some very strong language. Peter Capaldi said "Fundamentally 80% of the final cut is the script that we started with. The improvisation just makes it feel more real and not written." Prior to rehearsals, the scripts were sent to Ian Martin, described as a "swearing consultant", who added some of the more colourful language.

=== Filming ===
The programme's producer was Adam Tandy, who had produced all of Iannucci's television projects since 2000. The first series was filmed in the former Guinness brewery in Park Royal in west London, adjacent to the A40 road. The programme was shot with hand-held cameras to give it a sense of vérité or fly-on-the-wall documentary. The documentary style was furthered by the absence of any incidental music or laughter track. One of the key reference points for the style of direction was the realistic approach of the Dogme 95 film movement in general, and the first Dogme film The Celebration in particular. Actors were free to move around the set as they wished during takes, with camera operators following them, and wireless microphones were used to capture dialogue at all times.

== Plot ==
The action centres on the fictional Department of Social Affairs and Citizenship ("DoSAC"—previously the Department of Social Affairs, or "DSA", prior to the reshuffle of episode five), which supposedly came out of the prime minister's passing enthusiasm for "joined-up government". Thus it acts as a "super department" overseeing many others, with some similarities to the Cabinet Office. This concept enables different political themes to be dealt with in the programme, similar to the Department of Administrative Affairs in Yes Minister.

Hugh Abbot, played by Chris Langham, is a blundering minister heading the department, whose every move is tracked with mounting ire by Malcolm Tucker (Peter Capaldi), Number 10's highly aggressive and domineering "enforcer". The programme also features James Smith as senior special adviser Glenn Cullen, Chris Addison as junior policy adviser Ollie Reeder, and Joanna Scanlan as civil service press secretary Terri Coverley.

The beginning of the third series saw Hugh Abbot replaced as head of DoSAC by Nicola Murray (Rebecca Front), who arrives without her own staff, so Ollie and Glenn find themselves keeping their jobs.

From series 4, after a general election which results in a coalition government, Peter Mannion MP (Roger Allam) is the new Secretary of State for DoSAC, supported by his team of special advisers, commanded by Number 10's director of communications Stewart Pearson (Vincent Franklin) and thwarted by his new coalition partner, DoSAC's junior minister Fergus Williams MP (Geoffrey Streatfeild). Nicola Murray MP is now leader of the opposition, and opposition spin doctor Malcolm Tucker is desperate for a return to power.

== Episodes ==
| Series | Episodes | Originally released | | |
| Series | Episodes | First released | Last released | Network |
|---|---|---|---|---|
| 1 | 3 | 19 May 2005 | 2 June 2005 | BBC Four |
| 2 | 3 | 20 October 2005 | 3 November 2005 | BBC Four |
| Specials | 2 | 2 January 2007 | 3 July 2007 | BBC Four |
| 3 | 8 | 24 October 2009 | 12 December 2009 | BBC Two |
| 4 | 7 | 8 September 2012 | 27 October 2012 | BBC Two |

=== Series 1 (2005) ===
The first series of three episodes tracks the installation of Hugh Abbot as the new Secretary of State for Social Affairs following the orchestrated ousting of Cliff Lawton in response to press pressure. Subsequently, these episodes follow Abbot's attempt to make his mark as a member of the Cabinet whilst simultaneously avoiding the ire of Malcolm Tucker, the Government's Director of Communications. Abbot begins his tenure by misinterpreting the Prime Minister, assuming his support for developing a benefit fraud detection unit known colloquially as the 'Snooper Force'. Malcolm learns of concern that the Treasury were bypassed in the announcement decision, however, leaving Hugh and his advisors Oliver Reeder and Glenn Cullen forty minutes to improvise a policy to a press briefing. Later, Abbot is forced by Malcolm to enhance his cultural knowledge by watching clips from EastEnders and The Bill, only to discover that one of the extras was a member of a focus group that drove the decision to choose one of two contradictory policies. In the series finale, the press learn Abbot is intentionally keeping a second property empty for his use by listing it on the market and rejecting all offers, bringing him close to resignation.

=== Series 2 (2005) ===
The second batch of episodes takes place before a cabinet reshuffle, and follows Hugh's attempts to keep his job. Ollie Reeder is seconded to number 10 "to phone his girlfriend" Emma Messinger, a member of the shadow defence policy team, where he is under the close eye of enforcer Jamie. Meanwhile, Terri Coverley is on compassionate leave following the death of her father, leaving her role to Robyn Murdoch, a senior press officer. The department also has to contend with the interference of the prime minister's "blue skies" adviser Julius Nicholson (Alex MacQueen). The minister and the department survive the reshuffle, with the department being rebranded as the "Department of Social Affairs and Citizenship" and moved to a new building. However, the mistakes and compromises continue.

=== Specials (2007) ===
In the two specials, following the Christmas break, Hugh Abbot is in Australia and the department has to "babysit" junior minister for immigration Ben Swain (Justin Edwards), who is described as a "nutter" (a term used for supporters of prime-minister-in-waiting "Tom"). The first special—"Rise of the Nutters"—revolves around a computer problem at Immigration, which is exacerbated by the junior minister appearing in a disastrous Newsnight interview. The opposition policy adviser, Emma Messinger, capitalises on the error by stealing an idea from her boyfriend, Ollie Reeder, to send the shadow minister Peter Mannion on a fact-finding mission at an immigration centre. Meanwhile, Tucker is concerned about his position in the government after speculating that the prime minister's handover to Tom Davis is expected in less than six months. Tucker conspires with Ollie to leak the prime minister's "legacy programme" (the PM's plan to move the handling of immigration policy to a non-political executive board) in the hope of stalling his departure, inadvertently leading the PM to resign early. The next episode—"Spinners and Losers"—follows a single night of spin, as advisers, junior politicians and enforcers all try to better their position during the transition, but only Malcolm gets anywhere.

=== Series 3 (2009) ===
In series 3, Hugh Abbot is replaced as minister by Nicola Murray, played by Rebecca Front. She is an unexpected, last-minute choice for the position, and given her inexperience and lack of staff, she is forced to retain Ollie and Glenn as her advisers. The series continues to focus on the general running, or mis-running, of DoSAC, with Murray's attempts to formulate her "Fourth Sector Pathfinder Initiative" being a running thread throughout the series. With the cloud of the forthcoming general election and tension at 10 Downing Street looming, the series also broadens its scope to include episodes set at the annual party conference and BBC Radio 5 Live. We also see more of Murray's opposite number, Peter Mannion, in the Shadow Cabinet and other members of the opposition first seen in the 2007 specials. The gradual breakdown of Malcolm Tucker and appearance of new threats to his control, in particular Steve Fleming (David Haig), are also major plotlines. The series ends with Fleming forcing Malcolm's resignation, only to be ousted himself a matter of days later. Having regained dominance, Malcolm decides to call an election immediately to seize the initiative from his enemies in the opposition and his own party.

=== Series 4 (2012) ===
In series 4, the government and opposition have switched places following the election, as a result of a hung parliament and there is therefore a coalition government with a smaller third party. Peter Mannion has been made the Secretary of State for Social Affairs and Citizenship, but has to contend with Fergus Williams, his junior minister from his coalition partner's party. Meanwhile, following Tom Davis's defeat and resignation, Nicola Murray had been elected by her party, apparently on a technicality, over Dan Miller, her opponent, as leader of the opposition, although she resigns at the end of episode four and is replaced by her deputy, Miller. A running thread throughout the series is an ongoing "Leveson-style public inquiry" which takes place in episode six. While the first four episodes each focuses solely on one side (episodes one and three focusing on the coalition, and episodes two and four focusing on the opposition), each episode thereafter cuts between the parties. The final three episodes of series 4 show all parties trying to cover their tracks regarding a public health care bill which has led to the public eviction and consequent suicide of Douglas Tickel, a nurse with a history of mental illness. All three main parties have some level of responsibility and have participated in the illegal leaking of documents, in particular Tickel's medical records, which is the reason for the Goolding Inquiry being launched.

== Cast and characters ==
Most episodes focus on the department's incumbent minister and a core cast of advisers and civil servants, under the watchful eye of Number 10's enforcer, Malcolm Tucker. Over its run, the series has developed a large cast of additional characters, who form the government, opposition, as well as members of the media.

- Malcolm Tucker (Peter Capaldi) – Series 1–4 – The aggressive, profane and feared director of communications for the government. He serves two main roles: acting as the prime minister's chief enforcer to ensure the cabinet ministers all follow the party line, and managing the government's crisis management PR, usually in the form of spin. He regularly uses smears or threats of violence to achieve his ends. Tucker also appears in In the Loop. The Guardian used the character in its coverage of the 2010 general election and the Labour leadership contest in a column written by Jesse Armstrong. The character is patterned on real-life government director of communications Alastair Campbell, as well as Hollywood producers such as Harvey Weinstein.
- Rt Hon Hugh Abbot MP (Chris Langham) – Series 1–2 – He is the Secretary of State for Social Affairs (later Social Affairs and Citizenship). He is an inept cabinet minister who is generally out of touch with the electorate. While he believes he has some influence, he often finds himself at the mercy of events and bearing the brunt of Tucker's vitriol. He reads the New Statesman and has two children, Alicia and Charlie, whom he barely sees. He is replaced by junior minister Nicola Murray in a reshuffle at the beginning of series 3 without appearing on screen.
- Rt Hon Nicola Murray MP (Rebecca Front) – Series 3–4 – Nicola replaces Hugh Abbot from series 3. She is promoted to Social Affairs and Citizenship Secretary as a last-minute choice in a government reshuffle in the run up to a general election.
- Glenn Cullen (James Smith) – Series 1–4 – Glenn is senior special adviser to the minister. A long-standing friend of Hugh's since the campaign days, he acts as his chief adviser. He is generally politically adept, often being a voice of sense within the series, although due to his age is often ignored and emasculated by younger members of staff.
- Terri Coverley (Joanna Scanlan) – Series 1–4 – Terri acts as director of communications for the department. She is notionally responsible for press relations at DoSAC.
- Oliver "Ollie" Reeder (Chris Addison) – Series 1–4 – Ollie is a special adviser to the Secretary of State (formerly junior policy adviser). An Oxbridge graduate from Lincolnshire, he is arrogant, inept, inexperienced, somewhat gawky, and often inadvertently the cause of departmental mistakes.

== Broadcast history ==
The first run of three episodes screened on BBC Four from 19 May 2005. A further three episodes were transmitted 20 October until 3 November 2005. The six episodes were repeated on BBC Two in early 2006, and later on BBC America together as a single series. The subsequent DVD release of all six episodes describes the episodes as The Complete First Series.

An hour-long Christmas special, "The Rise of the Nutters", aired in January 2007 with a further ten episodes planned for later on in the year. Chris Langham did not reprise his role as Hugh Abbot, due to his arrest and later conviction on charges of possession of child pornography, ruling him out of any further roles. To fill this void, Iannucci introduced new characters into the series forming the opposition.

Another one-off hour-long episode "Spinners and Losers" aired on 3 July 2007. It was followed by a 15-minute extra episode through BBC Red Button, following the same story from the opposition's point of view.

For series 3, transmission switched to BBC Two, with subsequent repeats on BBC Four. The series ran for eight episodes from 24 October 2009 to 12 December 2009. As a Red Button extra, each episode had an accompanying 10-minute documentary titled Out of The Thick of It broadcast immediately afterwards and on the BBC Comedy website, which featured cut scenes, specially written scenes and, later, discussion of the programme by the series' writers, makers and with figures involved in British politics.

Internationally, series 1 and 2 aired back-to-back in Australia on ABC1 each Friday at 9:40 p.m. from 21 November 2008 and has since been repeated on ABC2 and UKTV. Later, the two hour-long specials along with series 3 premiered consecutively on the lower-rated ABC2 channel from 7 July 2011 each Thursday at 10:15 p.m. and again repeated, this time on ABC1 and UKTV.

A fourth series was commissioned in March 2010. Work began on the scripts in March 2011, filming began in March 2012 and airing started on BBC Two on 8 September 2012. The fourth series is co-produced by Hulu. Iannucci stated that the coalition government, in particular the role of the Liberal Democrats, would remain the target of the next series. In an interview with The Guardian, he stated his idea was for Peter Mannion to have become a minister "but there will be someone from the other party in the coalition in his office, so a lot of the comedy will come from that tension between duplicated ministers." Press for the fourth series partially focused on the applicability of the show to real life, with Will Smith commenting that the use of the word "omnishambles", coined in the third series, becoming a political meme in the months before transmission being a "baffling" example of life imitating art.

== Ratings ==
=== Series 1 ===
| Episode No. | Airdate | Viewers | BBC Four Weekly Ranking |
|---|---|---|---|
| 1 | 19 May 2005 | 319,000 | 1 |
| 2 | 26 May 2005 | 256,000 | 1 |
| 3 | 2 June 2005 | 164,000 | 3 |

=== Series 2 ===
| Episode No. | Airdate | Viewers | BBC Four Weekly Ranking |
|---|---|---|---|
| 1 | 20 October 2005 | 245,000 | 3 |
| 2 | 27 October 2005 | 123,000 | 9 |
| 3 | 3 November 2005 | 146,000 | 7 |

=== Specials ===
| Episode No. | Airdate | Viewers | BBC Four Weekly Ranking |
|---|---|---|---|
| 1 | 2 January 2007 | 247,000 | 5 |
| 2 | 3 July 2007 | 258,000 | 4 |

=== Series 3 ===
No ratings available.

=== Series 4 ===
| Episode No. | Airdate | Viewers (millions) | BBC Two Weekly Ranking |
|---|---|---|---|
| 1 | 8 September 2012 | 1.59 | 14 |
| 2 | 15 September 2012 | 1.38 | 28 |
| 3 | 22 September 2012 | 1.69 | —N/a |
| 4 | 29 September 2012 | —N/a | —N/a |
| 5 | 13 October 2012 | —N/a | —N/a |
| 6 | 20 October 2012 | —N/a | —N/a |
| 7 | 27 October 2012 | 1.80 | —N/a |

== Reception ==
=== Critical response ===
The Thick of It received critical acclaim during its original run. On Metacritic, the first series holds a score of 90 out of 100 based on 4 reviews, indicating "[u]niversal acclaim". Entertainment Weekly gave the series a grade of A−, with reviewer Alynda Wheat calling the "sly Britcom [...] a C-SPAN spin-off of [...] The Office." Margy Rochlin in The New York Times described it as "urgently authentic. Visually, the series has a news-as-it-is-happening feel, where actors are often only half in the frame or partly obscured while reciting a line of dialogue. The cameras will skitter restlessly from character to character, sometimes bouncing so crazily that the result looks like a foot chase from Cops." The DVD of the first two series received a perfect score from the UK's Empire magazine, with critic William Thomas calling it "the finest shot of pitch-black comic vitriol to be aimed at Whitehall in many a moon." A DVD of the post-series 2 specials also received a perfect score from Gary Andrews of Den of Geek, who wrote: "What makes The Thick of It so watchable is the feeling that what you're watching could well have happened at one point or another behind the scenes at Westminister. Even the minor characters are perfectly drawn and everybody gets at least one good line, with classic quotes popping up in virtually every line of dialogue. Yes Minister may have set the bar for political sitcoms but The Thick of It adds gratuitous swearing and a group of utterly unlikeable yet immensely watchable characters."

The third series has a Rotten Tomatoes score of 83% based on 6 reviews, with an average score of 10/10. The day its first episode aired, Caitlin Moran wrote an article for The Times calling The Thick of It the "best show ever made" and a show that "has changed the way we see politics." Verne Gay of Newsday gave the series a highest possible grade of A+, calling it "[o]ne of the flat-out funniest half-hours of television in the English-speaking world." His review, published in 2012, posited that Ianucci's semi-spin-off of the show—the U.S.-based Veep—was a "pallid knockoff" compared to The Thick of It because of Capaldi's role as Malcolm Tucker in the latter, "a human blowtorch who doesn't merely dress down subordinates but rips their clothes off to pour sulfuric acid—figuratively speaking, though barely—on their still-smoldering skin." The A.V. Club's David Sims' retrospective assessment of the series was also mostly positive, though he opined that Malcolm's "thrilling" "fall from grace" towards the end was a bit rushed. In his review of the first episode, Michael Deacon of The Daily Telegraph felt that Tucker's character was "overdone", but admitted that this criticism was "silly" and "tantamount to saying the show's too funny." A negative review came from The Guardian, whose Michael White felt that the show "lacked heart, lacked sympathy, lacked good guys, let alone honest ambitions. In that sense it's the exact opposite of another highly professional show about politics, The West Wing. [...] But I can't stand The West Wing either: too sentimental, just as The Thick of It is much too cynical. I can see that it's funny, but I rarely laugh."

The fourth and final series has a Rotten Tomatoes score of 88% based on 16 reviews, with an average score of 7.30/10. It is also the only series to have a critical consensus on the site, which reads: "Armando Ianucci's gloriously profane satire concludes at the peak of its dyspeptic hilarity, combining its withering eye for political machinations and its Shakespearean flow of curse words to deliver a harrowingly funny sendoff." James Poniewozik, writing for Time, found that "the political specificity" of the show's situations "give it bite. And the way it draws its various characters gives it a kind of poignance for all its hard-hearted cynicism. Political satires like to depict pols as self-interested, cold professionals who have traded in their ideals, and that's plenty true here. But Mannion and the various staffers are also simply imperfect people, fallen short of their ambitions and stuck in what are—for all the perks and access to power—often lousy, exhausting, crappy jobs, which grind them down and smother their personal lives." Anthony Paletta of New York magazine also wrote positively of the show's characterizations, noting their "genuine consciences" at various points. He also praised the show for its "startlingly versatile obscenity." A few critics, however, expressed reservations regarding the final series. Graeme Thornson of The Arts Desk, for example, felt that "[t]ime [had] rounded off some of the sharp edges" of the show, but conceded that "it still delivers a highly generous helping of belly laughs per minute." Sam Wollaston of The Guardian was more critical, writing: "There is an unsubtlety, a too-obviousness, about it that makes me wonder whether Armando Iannucci, what with all his other projects like [sic] taking over America and the world, had let his eye off this one."

=== Accolades ===
The series has been the recipient of a number of awards, particularly from the BAFTA. Series 1 won both Best Situation Comedy and Chris Langham won Best Comedy Performance at the 2006 BAFTA Television Awards, with Peter Capaldi being nominated for the same award in 2006 and 2008. Capaldi won the BAFTA for Best Male Comedy Performance at the 2010 awards, with Rebecca Front winning Best Female Comedy Performance. The series was also declared the Best Situation Comedy. Additionally, the series won Best Situation Comedy from the Royal Television Society in 2006 and 2010, and won Broadcasting Press Guild Awards in 2006 and 2010 for Best Sitcom and Best Writing Team.

== Legacy ==
The Thick of It has often been ranked as one of the greatest TV shows of all time. In 2019, The Guardian ranked it the fourth-greatest show of the 21st century, with Phil Harrison writing that the "craven, idiotic likes of Peter Mannion and Nicola Murray would be paragons of probity and wisdom in today's parliamentary landscape. But at the time, Armando Iannucci's scabrous comedy felt like an indictment of everything wrong with the spin and cynicism of British politics." Empire included it at No. 81 on their list of "The 100 Best TV Shows Of All Time", calling it "one of the sharpest, fastest-witted comedies ever, skewering Britain's political class via a tornado of creative cursing." Digital Spy readers voted it the 66th-greatest show of the 21st century. The following year, BBC Culture polled 206 critics, journalists, academics and industry figures from around the world to compile the 100 greatest television series of the 21st century; The Thick of It came in at No. 20. The website also selected it as one of 25 shows that defined the century, with Turkish film critic Ali Arikan writing:

The early part of the new century was marked by a heinous trend of "new optimism" in U.S. comedy, where spiritual redemption was available to even the least deserving. On the opposite end of the spectrum was The Thick of It, Armando Iannucci's caustic UK satire, the central premise of which was that everyone involved in government were contemptible halfwits interested purely in self-preservation. Showcasing ever more inventive ways in which powerless politicians and useless civil servants can create monumental crises out of molehills, the show made a star of Peter Capaldi (years after he had won an Oscar for a short film he directed), whose scathing spin doctor Malcolm Tucker frantically rampaged through Westminster like a foul-mouthed Godzilla. Any faith in politics was confidently and certainly rebuked.

Many commentators have written about the show's continued relevance in the years following its final series. In 2016, NME published an article titled "Eight Times Brexit Made British Politics Look Like The Thick of It". The following year, Ianucci revived Malcolm Tucker for a 4-page Brexit debate against Alan Partridge (another character he co-created) for The Big Issue. Gavin Haynes wrote in Vice in 2019:

Time and again, The Thick of It led and reality fell in behind. Eighteen months after "Do you know what it's like to clean up your own mother's piss?" we had The Gillian Duffy Incident. Nick Clegg used to bang on about "alarm clock Britain". Season four's Nicola Murray had her own target market: "the quiet bat-people". Murray's came first. The term "omnishambles", coined on the show in 2009, leapt from the screen into politics after George Osborne's flaky 2012 budget. By the following year, Malcolm Tucker's phrase had entered the OED.

Adam Miller, writing for Herald Scotland, wrote that it "has become a cliche" to compare modern political developments to the show, noting: "rarely has a Tory story in the last few years not led to The Thick of It trending on Twitter." Collider's Joe Hoeffner wrote in 2022: "Just as any vaguely dystopian technological development is compared to an episode of Black Mirror, people can't help but wonder what Malcolm Tucker would have to say whenever someone in Whitehall makes a fool of themselves, which, in recent years, is more or less on a daily basis."

On 26 August 2025 Peter Mandelson wrote in an e-mail discussing the propriety of a replica of a red box being given as a gift to former US president Bill Clinton that "This is like something out of the Thick of It."

== Spin-offs ==
=== In the Loop ===
In May 2008, the BBC issued a press release stating that filming had commenced on a feature-length adaptation named In the Loop starring Peter Capaldi, Tom Hollander, James Gandolfini, Anna Chlumsky, Chris Addison, Gina McKee and Steve Coogan. The film followed the plight of the International Development minister as an inadvertent comment in an interview leads to him being used as a puppet by the president of the United States and the prime minister who are looking to launch a war in the Middle East. The film follows the officials and advisers in their behind-the-scenes efforts either to promote the war or prevent it.

Although many of the TV series cast returned, the only actual returning characters are Malcolm Tucker, Jamie McDonald and Sam Cassidy, with series regulars Chris Addison, James Smith, Joanna Scanlan, Alex MacQueen, Olivia Poulet, Eve Matheson and Will Smith playing wholly new characters altogether. The film premiered in the U.S. at the 2009 Sundance Film Festival and in the UK at the 2009 Glasgow Film Festival. It was released on 17 April 2009 in the United Kingdom. In The Loop was nominated for an Academy Award for Best Adapted Screenplay in 2010. Several cast members later played similar roles in Veep.

=== American remake (2007) ===
On 27 October 2006, it was announced that The Thick of It would be adapted for American television, focusing on the daily lives of a low-level member of the United States Congress and his staff. Arrested Development creator Mitch Hurwitz would be the executive producer, along with Iannucci and Richard Day. The pilot was directed by Christopher Guest, and produced by Sony Pictures and BBC Worldwide. The cast included John Michael Higgins, Oliver Platt, Henry Winkler, Michael McKean, Alex Borstein and Wayne Wilderson.

ABC did not pick up the show for its 2007 Autumn schedule. Iannucci distanced himself from the pilot, saying: "It was terrible ... they took the idea and chucked out all the style. It was all conventionally shot and there was no improvisation or swearing. It didn't get picked up, thank God." Other networks including HBO, Showtime and NBC expressed interest in the show, and in April 2009, Iannucci re-entered talks with HBO over the possibility of an American adaptation.

=== Veep ===
In November 2010 it was announced that HBO had ordered a pilot for a new series called Veep, to be written, directed and produced by Iannucci. It stars Julia Louis-Dreyfus in the leading role as vice president of the United States. and also includes several of the American cast members who played similar characters in In the Loop, most notably series co-star Anna Chlumsky. The series began airing in April 2012. Although it is not a direct spin-off, Veep shares a similar tone and style with The Thick of It. Veep began airing in the UK on Sky Atlantic beginning in June 2012. Justin Edwards and Rebecca Gethings appear in the Veep episode "Special Relationship" as different characters.

== Media releases ==
On 2 April 2007, a DVD of the first six episodes was released in the UK as "The Complete First Series". It also included audio commentary, deleted scenes and photo galleries. The two specials were released on a second DVD in the UK in April 2009. The third series was released on DVD in April 2010, followed by a "complete series" to-date boxed set. Although the third series was filmed and broadcast on the BBC in high-definition video there has been no release to date on Blu-ray. A North American "Series One to Three" DVD boxed set was briefly scheduled for release in late 2012, but the release was delayed until 6 August 2013, in order to allow all four seasons (plus specials) to be included in what was now a "Complete Series" release. On 30 April 2026 'The Thick of It: The Complete BBC TV Soundtracks' was released, using the audio from all series and specials.

== In other media ==
- The Thick of It: The Scripts, a book containing the scripts from the first two series and the 2007 specials, was published on 1 September 2007.
- A tie-in book, The Thick of It: The Missing DoSAC Files, was published on 4 November 2010. This book was included in the DVD box-set of The Thick of It series and the film, In the Loop. An iPhone app, based on the DoSAC Files book and named 'Malcolm Tucker: The Missing Phone', was released in 2010, and was nominated for a New Media award at the 2011 Television BAFTAs.
- In the run-up to the 2010 general election, the column 'Malcolm Tucker's election briefing' appeared weekly in The Guardian, written by Jesse Armstrong.
- A one-off column written by Ian Martin in the character of Stewart Pearson—'Stewart Pearson's Media Notebook'—appeared in The Guardian in November 2010.

== See also ==
- Omnishambles
- Political fiction
- Political satire
- The Hollowmen
