= Kevin Loader =

British film and television producer

Kevin Loader is a British film and television producer. Since 1996, he and co-owner Roger Michell have run a London-based production company, Free Range Films, through which the pair have made several feature films directed by Michell, including The Mother, Enduring Love, Venus, Hyde Park on Hudson, and Le Week-end. Their most recent film is an adaptation by Michell of Daphne Du Maurier's My Cousin Rachel. The company is also developing and producing film and television projects with other directors. Loader was awarded the Bafta for Best Television Serial in 2015 for The Lost Honour of Christopher Jefferies.

== Education ==
Loader was educated at Maidstone Grammar School and Christ's College, Cambridge, where he read English. He then pursued post-graduate studies at The University of Connecticut, where he also taught.

== Career ==
Loader returned to London and joined BBC Television as a trainee in 1982, and over the next seven years worked on a series of current affairs, magazine and arts programmes. He directed films for arts documentary strands such as "Omnibus" and "Arena", and in 1989 was the founding Managing Editor of "The Late Show", a nightly live arts programme that ran on BBC2 for four years.

In 1990 he moved to BBC Drama, where his first production was "The Wolvis Family", an innovative studio comedy about a family in therapy written by Tom Lubbock and Roger Parsons. Other BBC dramas produced by Loader included Clarissa and "The Buddha of Suburbia" - both nominated for six BAFTA awards "Look At It This Way", from the novel by Justin Cartwright, and screen versions of plays "Bed" and "My Night With Reg". He acted as an Executive Producer on several series including "Holding On" and "The Tenant of Wildfell Hall". He also worked with Salman Rushdie on a planned, but aborted, seven-hour version of "Midnight's Children".

In 1996 Loader left the BBC to set up and act as General Manager of The Bridge, a London-based joint-venture between Sony Pictures Entertainment and Le Studio Canal Plus. The company ran for three years and developed films including "Birdsong", "To Kill A King" and "Enduring Love", although all of these would be produced later with different companies and financiers.

Loader and Michell had been developing a film of Louis De Bernieres's best-selling novel "Captain Corelli's Mandolin" since acquiring the rights shortly after publication, and Loader went on to produce the film for Working Title Films in 2000, with John Madden directing a cast which included Nicolas Cage, Penélope Cruz and John Hurt. Filming took place entirely on the island of Kefalonia in the Greek Ionian islands, and the film opened in 2001.

Loader was a partner in Natural Nylon Entertainment, the film company founded by actors Jude Law, Ewan McGregor, Jonny Lee Miller, Sean Pertwee and Sadie Frost et al between 2001 and 2003.

Since then Loader has produced several films for Free Range Films, worked with Ecosse Films on features including Sam Taylor-Johnson's "Nowhere Boy" and Andrea Arnold's "Wuthering Heights", and produced other films including Alan Bennett and Nicholas Hytner's "The History Boys", "The Lady In The Van" and "The Choral", along with Armando Iannucci's In the Loop, and "The Death of Stalin". Loader and Iannucci produced the latter's third feature film "The Personal History of David Copperfield", starring Dev Patel as David, in 2019. The collaboration with Iannucci also includes two seasons of HBO's space comedy "Avenue 5". His most recent film productions include "Prima Facie", starring Cynthia Erivo, and "The Housekeeper" with a cast that includes Anthony Hopkins, Catriona Balfe and Emma Laird.

== Awards ==
Among his awards is the Bafta for Best Television Serial in 2015 for "The Lost Honour of Christopher Jefferies".
