= Roger Drew =

British illustrator and screenwriter

- Born: 15 April 1971 (age 55); Jersey, Channel Islands
- Occupations: Illustrator, writer
- Known for: TV and radio comedy

Roger Drew is a British illustrator and television screenwriter who was educated at Victoria College, Jersey. He has written material for TV shows such as The Thick of It and won an Emmy for his work on Veep.

== Illustration ==
His illustration work ranges from music sleeve art for I Believe in a Thing Called Love by The Darkness, to TV artwork for Alexei Sayle's Merry-Go-Round and Johnny Vaughan Tonight.

== Writing ==
He often partners with Will Smith working on Smith's stand-up material and on TV shows.

The pair were writers on Armando Iannucci's satirical television comedy series Time Trumpet which was originally broadcast on BBC Two.

== Screenwriting credits ==
Roger Drew has worked on many films and TV shows, some of which are listed here.

- The 11 O'Clock Show (Channel 4, 1998)
- Back To The Front (Jasper Carrott) (BBC, 1999)
- The RDA (2000)
- Aaagh! It's the Mr Hell Show (BBC, 2001)
- Johnny Vaughan Tonight (BBC, 2002)
- Monkey Dust (BBC, 2003)
- Gash (Channel 4, 2003)
- 2004: The Stupid Version (BBC, 2004)
- The Impressionable Jon Culshaw (BBC, 2004)
- Celebrity Love Island: Aftersun (2005)
- The Thick Of It (2005–present)
- Time Trumpet (2006)
- The Omid Djalili Show (BBC, 2007–09)
- Brüno (2009)
- The Armstrong and Miller Show (2009–10)
- Veep (2012)

== Television ==
Year	Title	Role	Notes
2003	Happiness	Roger	Season 2, Episode 4
