= Natalie Bailey =

Australian writer and director

Natalie Bailey is a screenwriter and director, known for her work on TV series in the UK, US and Australia.

== Early life ==
Bailey emigrated to the UK from Australia in 2000.

== Career ==
Bailey has worked in the production and direction of many TV comedies led by Armando Iannucci, including Time Trumpet, The Thick of It, Veep and Avenue 5. Other television directing credits which include Pramface, Loaded, Damned and Run for HBO.

She directed the 2021 comedy drama TV miniseries on SBS, The Unusual Suspects. Bailey directed episodes five, six, and seven of the streaming series Joe vs. Carole.

She directed the 2023 drama series Bay of Fires for ABC.

In 2024, she was set as the lead director of Down Cemetery Road, an adaptation of the Mick Herron novel, starring Emma Thompson and Ruth Wilson.
