= Will Smith (comedian) =

English comedian, screenwriter, novelist, actor and producer (born 1971)

William Smith
- Born: William James Smith; 8 June 1971 (age 55); Winchester, Hampshire, England
- Occupations: Actor, screenwriter, stand-up comedian, novelist, producer
- Years active: 1996–present
- Known for: TV, film and radio comedy
- Relatives: Olly Smith (brother)

William James Smith (born 8 June 1971) is an English stand-up comedian, writer, actor and producer. He is the creator and showrunner of the Apple TV+ drama thriller Slow Horses (2022–), which was nominated for the Emmy for Outstanding Drama Series in 2024 and 2025.

He was part of the writing team of the BBC sitcom The Thick of It (2007–2012), in which he starred as Phil Smith. As co-writer and co-producer of the HBO sitcom Veep (2012–16), he was among the recipients of two Emmys and two Writers Guild of America Awards, and has received nominations for the Golden Globe Award for Best Television Series – Musical or Comedy and the Producers Guild of America Award for Best Episodic Comedy.

== Early life and education ==
Smith was born in Winchester, Hampshire, and grew up in Jersey, where he attended Victoria College. His brother is the TV presenter and wine critic Olly Smith.

== Career ==
=== Stand-up comedy ===
Smith started his career in stand-up comedy, winning awards including Chortle Best Headliner 2005 and Time Out Comedy 2004. One critic called him 'the Hugh Grant of comedy', and he appeared on The 11 O'Clock Show with Sacha Baron Cohen and Ricky Gervais as the character 'Posh Boy'. He took solo shows to the Edinburgh Fringe Festival every year from 2003 to 2006: "Will Smith Is Much Obliged", "Misplaced Childhood" (inspired by his love of the rock band Marillion and their 1985 album of the same name), "Ten Arguments I Should Have Won", and "How To Be Cool". Smith supported Gervais on his record-breaking sell-out 2007 "Fame" tour, and supported Ardal O'Hanlon and Johnny Vegas on national tours.

=== Television ===
Smith serves as showrunner and executive producer on Slow Horses, the Apple TV+ series based on the espionage novels by Mick Herron. Smith calls himself "a huge, huge Bond fan ... I'd love to write one", and describes Slow Horses as "the anti-Bond". The show films in the UK and stars Gary Oldman, Jonathan Pryce, Kristin Scott Thomas and Jack Lowden. The series, which premiered on Apple TV+ on 1 April 2022, won Smith the USC Scripter Award two years running, for best episodic adaptation of a printed work in 2023, and again in 2024. Smith was also nominated in the writer: drama category in the 2023 and 2025 Royal Television Society Programme Awards, and for best long form TV drama in the 2023 Writers' Guild of Great Britain awards. Smith won the 2024 Emmy Award for 'Outstanding Writing for a Drama Series' for Season's 3's episode "Negotiating with Tigers". Accepting the award, Smith referenced the Chris Rock–Will Smith slapping incident of the 2022 Oscars, saying "First of all, relax. Despite my name, I come in peace."

Smith has been involved with both British and American political satire. He was a writer and one of the executive producers on HBO's Emmy-winning sitcom Veep, starring Julia Louis-Dreyfus. He wrote or co-wrote the Veep episodes: Chung (Season 1); Midterms, Running (Season 2); Some New Beginnings, Fishing (Season 3); Storms and Pancakes, Testimony (Season 4); Thanksgiving, C**tgate (Season 5). Smith also wrote on the BAFTA-winning BBC political comedy The Thick of It. He was the only writer on the programme who acted in it – as MP Peter Mannion's inept adviser, The Lord of the Rings-obsessive Phil Smith. He also has a cameo role in the closing credits of In the Loop, the Anglo-American film spin-off.

He served as executive producer on HBO sitcom Avenue 5. Other writing credits include sitcoms Damned and Back, both airing on Channel 4. With Armando Iannucci and Roger Drew he devised BBC future comedy Time Trumpet, six episodes that screened in 2006. In 2018 he was reported to be working on co-writing a television series of Scarfolk.

=== Books ===
Comedy books by Smith include How to Be Cool (Harry Enfield said of it 'Will Smith is the coolest guy in the world (if uncool is the new cool) – he's also terrifically funny'), and The Joy of No Sex, published by Penguin, a parody of The Joy of Sex.

Smith has written for various publications, including the magazine Intelligent Life, in which he learnt something new for each issue. Articles included banjo-playing, ice-sculpting, circus skills and making a soufflé.

In 2015, Smith published his first novel, Mainlander (4th Estate, a division of HarperCollins), a thriller about a schoolboy who goes missing on Jersey. The Independent described it as 'John le Carré meets Middlemarch', and ShortList called it a 'knockout'.

Smith reflected on the difference between writing for television and writing a novel in The Guardian. "The chain from author to reader is short and simple – agent, editor, proofreader, shop/website. In TV, the script will have to be signed off by producers, executive producers, genre commissioners and channel commissioners, and that's still only a starting point". He cited as his influences John Cleese and Stephen Fry, as well as Charlotte Brontë and George Eliot.

=== Radio ===
Smith has appeared on BBC Radio 4 as a guest in comedy panel shows and in his own shows.

- Armando Iannucci's Charm Offensive
- Banter (2002, 2007)
- The Personality Test (2003–09)
- Will Smith Presents the Tao of Bergerac (2007), based on the 1980s TV series set on Jersey. Released as a BBC Audio CD in 2008.
- Will Smith's Midlife Crisis Management (2008)
- It's Your Round (2011)
- Mr and Mrs Smith (2012), sitcom about a couple in marriage counselling

== Acting credits ==
Year	Title	Role	Notes
1997	The 11 O'Clock Show		
2000	Time Gentlemen Please		
2003	Gash		
2004	A Wife For William		
2005	Back in the Day		
2006	The Charlotte Church Show		
2006	Never Mind the Buzzcocks		
2006–2012	The Thick of It	Phil Smith	2006, one-hour special in 2007, 2009, 2012
2007	The C Word	Presenter	The euphemism for "cunt", not "cancer"
2007	The Late Edition		
2008	For One Night Only		
2009	Argumental		2 guest appearances
2011	Comedy Lab	Tony	Season 12, Episode 5
2012	Have I Got News for You		
2012	Dead Boss	Governor Gorey	Season 1, Episode 6
2014	Paddington	Geographer	
2016–2018	Damned	Zac	
2017	Hampstead	Leon Rowlands	
2019	Greed	Teacher	
2025	The Roses	Derek	
