= In the Loop =

2009 British comedy film by Armando Iannucci

- British theatrical release poster
- Directed by: Armando Iannucci
- Screenplay by: Jesse Armstrong; Simon Blackwell; Armando Iannucci; Tony Roche
- Based on: Characters by Armando Iannucci
- Produced by: Kevin Loader; Adam Tandy
- Starring: Peter Capaldi; Tom Hollander; Gina McKee; James Gandolfini; Chris Addison
- Cinematography: Jamie Cairney
- Edited by: Billy Sneddon; Ant Boys
- Music by: Adem Ilhan
- Production companies: BBC Films; UK Film Council; Aramid Entertainment
- Distributed by: Optimum Releasing (United Kingdom); IFC Films (United States)
- Release dates: 22 January 2009 (Sundance); 17 April 2009 (United Kingdom)
- Running time: 105 minutes
- Country: United Kingdom
- Language: English
- Budget: £612,650
- Box office: $7.8 million

In the Loop is a 2009 British satirical dark comedy film directed by Armando Iannucci. It is a spin-off from Iannucci's television series The Thick of It (2005–12), and satirises British–American politics, in particular the invasion of Iraq. The film was nominated for the Academy Award and BAFTA Award for Best Adapted Screenplay.

== Plot ==
At a time when the United Kingdom and the United States are contemplating military intervention in the Middle East, the UK Minister for International Development, Simon Foster, offhandedly states during an interview on BBC Radio 4's Today programme that war in the region is "unforeseeable". The Prime Minister's Director of Communications, Malcolm Tucker, castigates Simon and warns him to toe the line. Toby Wright, Simon's new special adviser, is dating Suzy, who works in the Foreign Office, and he takes the credit when she gets Simon an invite to that day's Foreign Office–State Department meeting.

The US Assistant Secretary of State for Diplomacy, Karen Clark, opposes military intervention, and, at the meeting, she flags a report—titled "Post-War Planning: Parameters, Implications, and Possibilities" (PWPPIP)—by her aide Liza Weld about the pros and cons of intervention, which features many more cons than pros and contains caveats for most of the pros. Ambushed by reporters afterward, Simon rambles that the government must be prepared to "climb the mountain of conflict", and is again chastised by Malcolm, though the Prime Minister decides to send Simon to the US to gather information about problems that might arise for the UK in the event of a war.

Back in Washington, DC, hawkish US Assistant Secretary of State for Policy Linton Barwick is concerned that his secret war committee was mentioned during the Foreign Office meeting; Karen and Liza deduce that it is named the Future Planning Committee. Karen teams up with Lieutenant General George Miller, who opposes the war because he believes the US has insufficient military personnel available, and invites Simon to the upcoming meeting of the Future Planning Committee to "internationalize the dissent". Toby thoughtlessly leaks the true nature of the committee to a friend at CNN, and then meets up with Liza, whom he knows from university, at a bar, and they end up sleeping together.

Owing to Toby's leak, the Future Planning Committee meeting is swamped by reporters. Both Karen and Linton turn to Simon to back their respective causes, but he struggles to say anything meaningful in support of either. Malcolm arrives and confronts Linton about sending him to a diversionary briefing at the White House, and Linton asks him to supply the US with British intelligence that will support military intervention.

Back in Simon's Northampton constituency, a resident named Paul Michaelson urges him to do something about his constituency office wall, which is in danger of collapsing into Paul's mother's garden. When Paul feels ignored, he contacts the media, and there is growing criticism over Simon's inaction. Suzy finds out about Toby's one-night stand with Liza and breaks up with him, but as he is moving out of their apartment, he leaves her a copy of PWPPIP, asking her to leak it; she chastises him for not doing it himself.

The day of the UN Security Council vote on military intervention arrives, and everyone converges on the UN in New York. Simon tells his Director of Communications, Judy Molloy, to hint that he will resign as minister if the resolution is passed. Malcolm learns that PWPPIP has been leaked to BBC News, so he convinces the British Permanent Representative to the UN, Sir Jonathan Tutt, to move the vote forwards to before the BBC reports on PWPPIP. Linton tells Malcolm the vote cannot happen until he delivers the British intelligence, however, so Malcolm makes Sir Jonathan delay the vote again. Aided by Jamie McDonald, a senior press officer, Malcolm hastily fabricates some intelligence by forcing the reluctant Director of Diplomacy at the Foreign Office, Michael Rodgers, to generate a doctored copy of PWPPIP with its arguments against a war deleted.

The Security Council approves intervention in the Middle East. George informs Karen that, as a soldier, he cannot go through with their plan to resign together in protest now that the country is at war, and Simon's intention to make a statement by resigning is thwarted when Malcolm fires him, ostensibly over the collapsing wall story (which Malcolm seeded to the BBC to preempt coverage of PWPPIP). A new Minister for International Development is appointed, with her own special adviser, and Simon is left to deal with his constituents in Northampton.

== Cast ==
- Peter Capaldi as Malcolm Tucker, the UK Prime Minister's Director of Communications
- Tom Hollander as Simon Foster MP, UK Minister for International Development and MP for Northampton
- Gina McKee as Judy Molloy, Director of Communications for the UK Department for International Development
- James Gandolfini as Lieutenant General George Miller, the senior military assistant to the US Secretary of Defense
- Chris Addison as Toby Wright, a newly-appointed special advisor to the Minister for International Development
- Anna Chlumsky as Liza Weld, one of Assistant Secretary Clark's aides
- Paul Higgins as Jamie McDonald, a senior press officer in the Office of the Prime Minister
- Mimi Kennedy as Karen Clark, US Assistant Secretary of State for Diplomacy
- Alex Macqueen as Sir Jonathan Tutt, British Permanent Secretary to the UN
- Olivia Poulet as Suzy, a civil servant at the UK Foreign & Commonwealth Office, and Toby's girlfriend
- David Rasche as Linton Barwick, US Assistant Secretary of State for Policy
- James Smith as Michael Rodgers, Director of Diplomacy at the UK Foreign & Commonwealth Office
- Zach Woods as Chad, an ambitious junior staffer at the US State Department
- Enzo Cilenti as Bob Adriano, one of Assistant Secretary Linton's chief subordinates
- Johnny Pemberton as A.J. Brown, a staffer at the US State Department
- Joanna Scanlan as Roz, a staffer at Foster's constituency office in Northampton
- Harry Hadden-Paton as a civil servant at Downing Street
- Samantha Harrington as Sam, Malcolm's secretary
- Lucinda Raikes as a reporter
- James Doherty as a reporter
- Reid Sasser as the airport security man in Washington, DC
- Chipo Chung as Annabelle Hsin, a staffer at the US State Department
- Del Pentecost as a tourist at the White House
- Joanna Brookes as Mrs McDiarmid, a constituent of Foster
- Steve Coogan as Paul Michaelson, an aggrieved constituent of Foster
- Rita May as Mrs Michaelson, Paul's mother
- Eve Matheson as the new Minister for International Development
- Will Smith as Dan, a special advisor to the new Minister for International Development

Most of the British actors in the film had appeared, or would appear, in Iannucci's television series The Thick of It (2005–12), but the only actors with substantial roles in the film who portrayed the same character on the show are Capaldi and Higgins; Raikes, who played reporter Angela Heaney on the show, makes a brief appearance in the film as a reporter, and Harrington has a small role in the film as Malcolm's secretary, Sam Cassidy, which she reprised in six later episodes of the series. Actors who appeared in both multiple episodes of the show and in the film, but as different characters, include Addison, James Smith, Scanlan, Poulet, Will Smith, Macqueen, and Matheson; Hollander played a different character in one later episode of the series. Chlumsky, Woods, Kennedy, and Rasche went on to portray characters in Iannucci's American television series Veep (2012–19).

== Production ==
=== Writing ===
As explained by Jesse Armstrong, the writing of In The Loop used the same process the team of writers had developed when working on The Thick of It:

It's exactly the same format as used in The Thick of It. Armando holds it together in the middle. Simon Blackwell, Tony Roche and I meet him then come up with the story line. Us three go away and do the storyline then send it to Armando to be okayed and do the initial drafts. Then Ian Martin does additional material and rewrites as well. So it's a five-man team but all broken down into different compartments. It never feels unwieldy. Once we had the storyline mapped out with Armando, each of us took an act each, if you think of it as a three-act movie. I had the first crack at the first act, Simon at the second and Tony at the third. We looked at them all, Armando gave us notes and we did another rewrite and passed them around. It's not like one person does the plot, one does the jokes and one does the politics, but we all have our different strengths.

Noting that The Thick of It had been inspired by the Blair government's attacks on the BBC after the start of the Iraq War, the magazine Cinema Scope described In The Loop as a "retelling of the chain of events that inspired Iannucci to devise the series."

In an article for The Guardian, Iannucci wrote:

At least two people told me that Condoleezza Rice was a bit rubbish. She got rather star-struck in Washington and never really stood up to Dick Cheney and Donald Rumsfeld. Both of the [Pentagon and CIA] guys I met said: "And, as a result, people got killed." The CIA guy added: "And that's what really pisses me off!"

Elsewhere, Iannucci stated: "We don't go up to White House level, we deal mainly with state department underlings, the kind of people that actually make decisions with enormous political consequences."

=== Filming ===
In the Loop was a collaboration between BBC Films and the UK Film Council. Filming took place from May to December 2008, between the two The Thick of It specials that aired in 2007 and the third series of the show, which aired in the autumn of 2009, after the release of In the Loop. The film was shot on location in London, Washington, DC, and New York. Time Out London noted that the filmmaking style they observed during a set visit was very similar to that employed when filming The Thick of It:

The similarities are everywhere, down to the docu-style, handheld camerawork evident on the monitors (it's the same director of photography) and the anti-West Wing production design that eliminates all notions of political glamour.

Iannucci mentioned his progress on the film in several columns written for The Observer. In one, he wrote:

In the film I was finishing, we featured a motorcade. We had some police standing by to add authenticity. We started rolling, but could never get up a decent speed because of the traffic lights at each block. Then one of the police leant into the car and said: "D'you want me to turn my siren on? That'll let us through all the red lights." It worked and it was also quite exciting.

In a May 2009 article in The Telegraph, Iannucci claimed that, while doing research for the film, he was able to enter the US State Department headquarters by showing his BBC press pass and claiming to be "here for the 12.30", and then spent an hour taking photographs that were used for the film's set designs. The American political journalist and blogger Spencer Ackerman was one of the film's political consultants.

The scene in the film in which Toby and Liza attend a concert was filmed at the Black Cat, a real nightclub in DC, and the band that performs is Cannabis Corpse. The UN Headquarters scenes were filmed at Royal Festival Hall in London.

== Release ==
The world premiere of the film took place at the Sundance Film Festival on 22 January 2009. The film's European gala premiere screening took place at the independent Glasgow Film Theatre as the opening film of the Glasgow Film Festival on 12 February, and was attended by Iannucci and members of the cast.

The film was released in theatres in the United Kingdom on 17 April 2009. It was picked up by IFC Films for distribution in the US, where it began its theatrical release on 24 July 2009.

== Reception ==
=== Critical response ===
Reception to the film's premiere at the Sundance Film Festival was very positive, and In the Loop was released to critical acclaim. On review aggregator website Rotten Tomatoes, the film has an approval rating of 94% based on reviews from 173 critics, with an average score of 7.9/10; the site summarizes: "In the Loop is an uncommonly funny political satire that blends Dr. Strangelove with Spinal Tap for the Iraq war era." On Metacritic, the film has a weighted average score of 83 out of 100 based on 31 critics, indicating "universal acclaim".

Damon Wise of The Times gave the film five stars out of five and stated: "It's hard to settle on a standout element because it's all so outstanding, from the performances to the one-liners to the plot." David D'Arcy of Screen International was complimentary, but noted that the release of the film may have been poorly timed, given the new presidency of Barack Obama, and said that "its exuberant, boundless cynicism will test the demand for political satire in an Obama-infatuated America." Michael Phillips of the Chicago Tribune placed the film #7 on his list of the ten best films of 2009.

=== Accolades ===
The film received two nominations at the 63rd British Academy Film Awards; Outstanding British Film and Best Adapted Screenplay. At the 82nd Academy Awards, In the Loop was nominated for Best Adapted Screenplay.
