= Omnishambles =

Neologism from BBC political satire The Thick of It

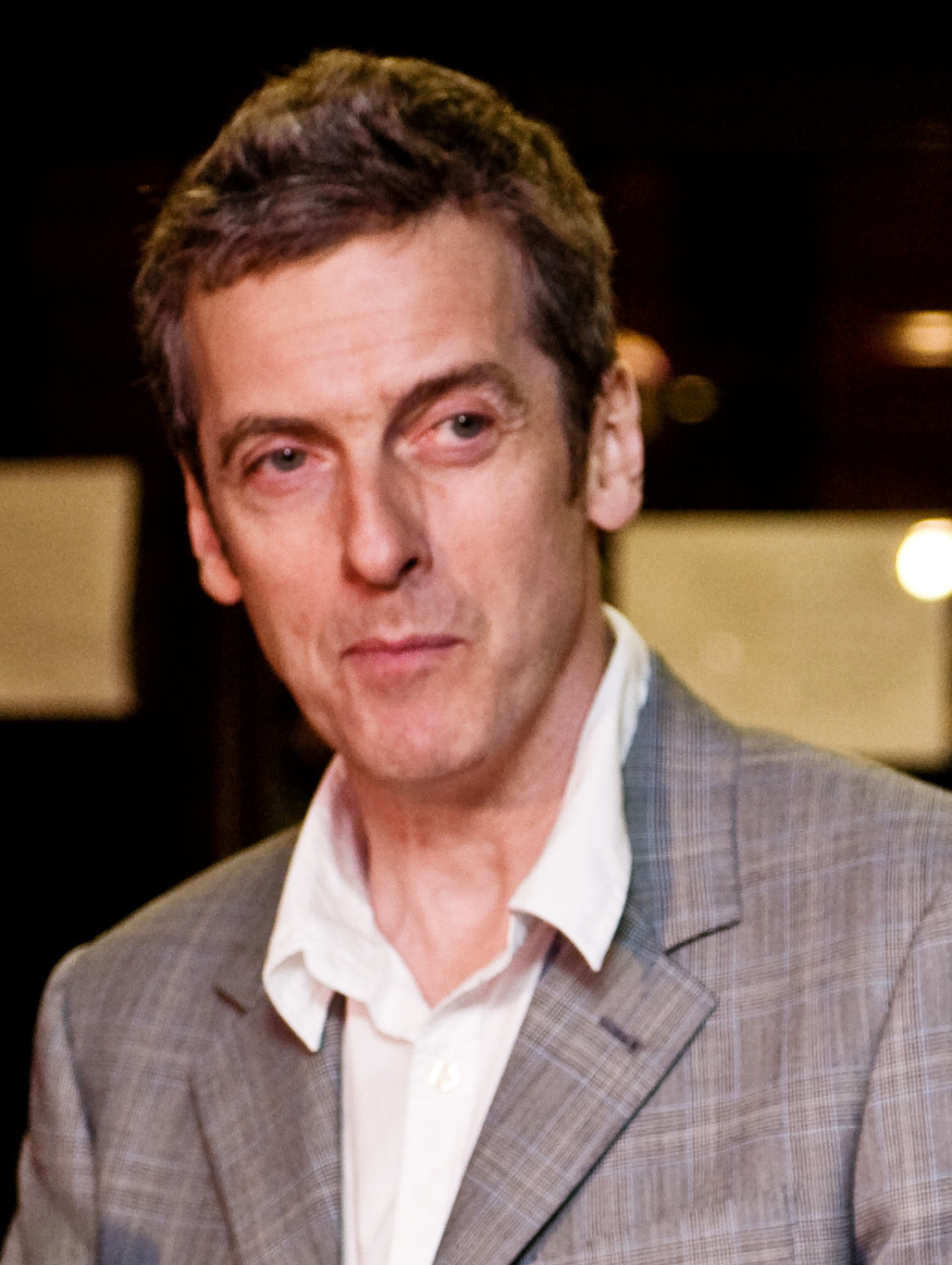
Malcolm Tucker, a fictional character played by Peter Capaldi uses the phrase “omnishambles” in the political satire The Thick of It

Omnishambles is a neologism first used in the BBC political satire The Thick of It in 2009. The word is derived from the noun shambles, a term for a situation of total disorder, with the addition of the Latin prefix omni-, meaning "all". Originally a "shambles" denoted the designated stock-felling and butchery zone of a medieval street market, from the butchers' benches (Latin scamillus "low stool, a little bench").

The word refers to a situation that is seen as shambolic from all possible perspectives. It gained popularity in 2012 after sustained usage in the political sphere led to its being named Oxford English Dictionary Word of the Year, and it was formally added to the online editions of the Oxford Dictionary of English in August 2013.

== Background ==
The term, coined by writer Tony Roche, was first used at the end of the first episode of the third series of BBC political satire The Thick of It, broadcast in 2009, during which Nicola Murray (Rebecca Front) is drafted in as a cabinet minister for the fictional Department of Social Affairs and Citizenship at the behest of the government's director of communications Malcolm Tucker (Peter Capaldi). Murray's first day as a cabinet minister is fraught with press inquiries about her husband's involvement in a private finance initiative contract, her appropriation of an expensive office chair from a staff member, and her intention to send her daughter to a private school. Tucker sends Murray to launch a by-election campaign, but a communications error results in her standing in front of candidate Liam Bentley's poster and blocking most of the letters so the sign appears to read "I am bent" (British slang that in this context means corrupt) as she is filmed and photographed. Tucker believes Murray to be a potential cause of political controversy, and his patience expires when it is revealed the minister is claustrophobic and she refuses to enter a lift. Tucker then delivers an angry rebuke to her:

Not only have you got a fucking bent husband and a fucking daughter that gets taken to school in a fucking sedan chair, you're also fucking mental. Jesus Christ, see you, you are a fucking omnishambles, that's what you are. You're like that coffee machine, you know: from bean to cup, you fuck up.

— Malcolm Tucker to Nicola Murray, "Series 3, Episode 1", The Thick of It.

== Entry into popular lexicon ==
The term was popularised by Labour Party leader and Leader of the Opposition Ed Miliband MP in a speech to the House of Commons during Prime Minister's Questions on 18 April 2012, criticising the government's 2012 budget and the resulting public image:

On charities, the reality is that the Prime Minister is not making the rich worse off. He is making charities worse off. Over the past month we have seen the charity tax shambles, the churches tax shambles, the caravan tax shambles and the pasty tax shambles, so we are all keen to hear the Prime Minister’s view on why he thinks, four weeks on from the Budget, even people within Downing Street are calling it an omnishambles Budget.

— Ed Miliband MP, Prime Ministers Questions, 18 April 2012

The term was again used in Parliament by Opposition politicians to criticise various government actions: by Chuka Umunna, Ed Balls, Steve Rotheram, Julie Hilling, Rachel Reeves, and Catherine McKinnell to criticise the budget; Yvette Cooper to criticise the failed deportation of Abu Qatada; and Ivan Lewis, Margaret Curran, and Caroline Flint in reference to the perceived ineffectualness of the government. It was adapted for use in Scottish politics by Labour MSP Richard Baker, who referred to First Minister Alex Salmond's refusal to admit to a lack of legal advice on an independent Scotland's accession to the European Union as a "Scomnishambles". The term made its debut in Australian politics in 2013 during a reply to the Governor-General's speech by Australian Greens Senator Scott Ludlam.

Due to its adoption as a political catchphrase, the editors of the Collins English Dictionary submitted the word for the dictionary's first public consultation into new additions, defining it as "something which is completely and continuously shambolic". In news coverage preceding the fourth series of The Thick of It, use of the term was cited by the cast and crew as an example of life imitating art; in an interview with ShortList, series co-writer Will Smith commented that politicians were "watching the show and embracing it", describing Miliband's use of the phrase as "baffling".

A similar term, "Romneyshambles" was created as a political attack during the 2012 United States presidential election, based on comments Republican Party nominee Mitt Romney made criticizing London's preparations for the 2012 Summer Olympics.

On 13 November 2012, omnishambles was named Word of the Year by the Oxford English Dictionary. Lexicographer and judge on the panel Fiona McPherson remarked that: "It was a word everyone liked, which seemed to sum up so many of the events over the last 366 days in a beautiful way."

The word was formally added to the online editions of the Oxford Dictionary of English in August 2013 together with a number of other words that had also gained popularity during 2012 and 2013. These included selfie, twerk and digital detox.

The term re-emerged following the 2017 United Kingdom general election, which produced a hung parliament, and was used to describe Conservative efforts to form a confidence-and-supply agreement with the Democratic Unionist Party. It was also used to describe the UK's Brexit negotiations process following the 2017 election.

The word "pomnishambles" (Pom being an Australian derogatory word for an English person) was used by BBC writer Tom Fordyce (apparently quoting others) for the England men's cricket team and their lack of success against Australia in late 2017.

In 2020, during the COVID-19 pandemic in the UK, the word re-emerged in late May (as "Domnishambles" – a portmanteau of Dominic Cummings' first name and the word omnishambles) as it was revealed that Dominic Cummings had visited Durham during the first lockdown.

In 2024, after ongoing issues with rail transport in Auckland, New Zealand, and cancelled trains due to heat (on days that were considered mild for summer weather) the mayor Wayne Brown also used "omnishambles" to describe a lack of co-ordination between various bodies responsible for Auckland's train service.

In his verdict on political staffer Bruce Lehrmann's defamation lawsuit against Network 10, Federal Court of Australia judge Michael Lee used "omnishambles" to describe the scandal surrounding Lehrmann's alleged rape of a colleague in Parliament House.
