= Tony Roche (writer) =

Comedy writer

Tony Roche is an English television, radio and film comedy writer and producer, best known as a writer of the HBO black comedy Succession, the HBO comedy Veep, the BBC Television series The Thick of It, and its film spin-off In the Loop.

He is credited with inventing the word omnishambles, which was named 2012 Word of the Year by the Oxford English Dictionary.

== Life and career ==
=== Stand-up and radio ===
After graduating from Warwick University with a degree in English, Roche became a stand-up comedian using material from a magazine he had produced in his final year. He was spotted at one of his stand-up comedy shows and asked to write jokes and topical sketches for radio.

Roche's first radio assignment was writing for The Alan Davies Show radio programme and for John Shuttleworth on BBC Radio 4. He created the series World of Pub for BBC Radio, and later adapted it for television. He also worked on the radio series The Sunday Format,

=== Film and television ===
Working with the creator of The Sunday Format, John Morton, Roche co-created its television equivalent Broken News. After making his move to television, Roche joined the writing team for Armando Iannucci's Gash, a satirical TV comedy for Channel 4. He later contributed to The Thick of It, Iannucci's political satire set in the fictional government Department of Social Affairs and Citizenship. The first series debuted on the BBC in 2005, and became a critical success. Roche wrote for all four series of the programme, as well as its spin-off film In the Loop, which was nominated for the Academy Award for Best Adapted Screenplay and BAFTA Award in the same category.

His other writing credits include The All New Harry Hill Show (ITV1), Alistair McGowan's Big Impression (BBC Two), Smith & Jones (BBC One), Dead Ringers (BBC Radio 4), Miranda (BBC Two) and Cast Offs, Fresh Meat and Back for Channel 4.

In 2011 Roche wrote Holy Flying Circus, a fictionalised account of the controversy surrounding the 1979 release of Monty Python's Life of Brian broadcast on BBC Four. Roche's script centred on the imagined build-up to the appearance of Michael Palin and John Cleese on BBC chat show Friday Night, Saturday Morning to defend Life of Brian. Roche's re-imagining of the event received criticism for its inaccuracies, including from former Python John Cleese who was cited to have seen the script and commented that he was "disappointed by its content" because it was "not a fair reflection of the facts". Roche defended his reasons for writing the film as he did in an article in The Daily Telegraph, stating: "The film isn’t an accurate re-telling of what happened. It doesn’t pay much attention to the facts. (Sorry.) Instead, it uses the story to discuss the nature of offence. Why did so many people get so offended?"

Roche was a writer and co-executive producer on Armando Iannucci's comedy series Veep for HBO. For his work on Veep, he won two Primetime Emmy Awards from six nominations: one for Outstanding Comedy Series and one for Outstanding Writing for a Comedy Series.

Roche worked as an executive producer and staff writer for HBO's Succession.

== See also ==
- List of Academy Award winners and nominees from Great Britain
