= Ian Martin (writer) =

English comedy writer

Ian Martin (born 1953) is an English comedy writer. Martin was a writer for the BBC series The Thick of It. He was hired in 2005 for Series 1 of the political satire by the show's creator, Armando Iannucci, in a role described as "swearing consultant", and later became a full member of the writing team. He won an Emmy for his writing across five series of Veep and was BAFTA nominated for co-writing The Death of Stalin.

== Early life ==
Martin was born in London and has lived in Lancaster since 1988, where half of his descendants now reside.

== Career ==
Martin edits the satirical website martian.fm. He is a weekly columnist for the Architects' Journal and a regular contributor to The Guardian newspaper. Other credits include writing additional material for the 2009 Oscar-nominated film In the Loop, the 2007 Armando Iannucci-created series Time Trumpet and several series of the radio show Armando Iannucci's Charm Offensive.

He is the author of The Coalition Chronicles (2011), a satirical and scatological account of a year in the parliamentary life of the Coalition government. He was a leading contributor to The Missing DoSAC Files (2010).

Martin was a writer and supervising producer for the HBO series Veep, having written on five seasons and having acted the role of Dave Wickford in Season 2. In 2014, Armando Iannucci described Martin in The Washington Post as being “very good at making the language of political debate suddenly become nonsensical.”

Martin's radio play The Hartlepool Spy, concerning the Hartlepool monkey, was broadcast on BBC Radio 4 on Christmas Day 2018, with a cast including Michael Palin, Vic Reeves, Toby Jones, Gina McKee and Monica Dolan.

== Personal life ==
Martin is married with two children and four grandchildren, two of whom live in Seoul, and the others in Lancaster, where his daughter teaches music at Lancaster Royal Grammar School.

In August 2015, Martin endorsed Jeremy Corbyn's campaign in the Labour Party leadership election. He wrote in The Guardian: "To win over public opinion, Labour must reflect it. Is that right? I think that's right. I think that's why they're all doing this synchronised frowning at poor repellent-ebullient Jeremy Corbyn and pretending he's a weirdo."
