= List of Veep characters =

Veep is an American political satire comedy television series created by Armando Iannucci. The series stars Julia Louis-Dreyfus as Selina Meyer. The first season premiered on HBO on April 22, 2012, with its seventh season concluding on May 12, 2019.

== Overview ==
Actor	Character	Seasons						
Actor	Character	1	2	3	4	5	6	7
Main characters
Julia Louis-Dreyfus	Selina Meyer	Main	Main	Main	Main	Main	Main	Main
Anna Chlumsky	Amy Brookheimer	Main	Main	Main	Main	Main	Main	Main
Tony Hale	Gary Walsh	Main	Main	Main	Main	Main	Main	Main
Reid Scott	Dan Egan	Main	Main	Main	Main	Main	Main	Main
Timothy Simons	Jonah Ryan	Main	Main	Main	Main	Main	Main	Main
Matt Walsh	Mike McLintock	Main	Main	Main	Main	Main	Main	Main
Sufe Bradshaw	Sue Wilson	Main	Main	Main	Main	Main		Guest
Kevin Dunn	Ben Cafferty		Recurring	Main	Main	Main	Main	Main
Gary Cole	Kent Davison		Recurring	Recurring	Main	Main	Main	Main
Sam Richardson	Richard Splett			Recurring	Main	Main	Main	Main
Sarah Sutherland	Catherine Meyer	Guest	Recurring	Recurring	Recurring	Recurring	Recurring	Main
Clea DuVall	Marjorie Palmiotti					Recurring	Recurring	Main

== Main characters ==
=== Selina Meyer ===
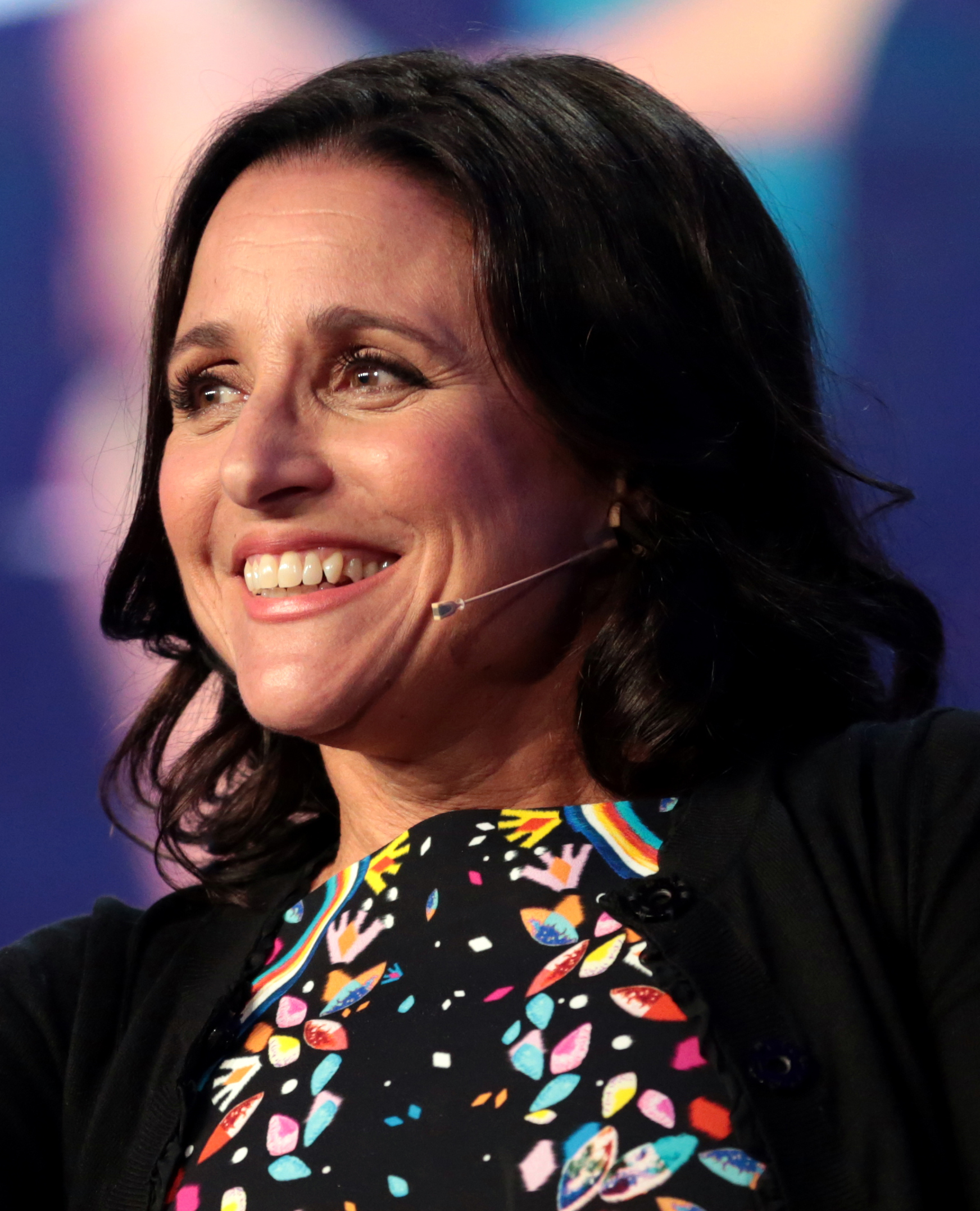
Julia Louis-Dreyfus, who portrays Selina Meyer.

- Julia Louis-Dreyfus as Selina Meyer (née Eaton):

Born Selina Catherine Eaton, a former Maryland senator who, in the start of the series, is the titular vice president, or "Veep", who has a strained relationship with the president. After the president declines to run for a second term, she begins campaigning for the presidency in Season 3. At the end of Season 3, she becomes president when he resigns for personal issues. Due to a complex manipulation of constitutional law, she loses the presidential race in Season 5. After trying to decide what her post-presidential legacy should be during Season 6, she decides to run for another term as president by Season 7. She is divorced with one daughter, but remains romantically entangled with her ex-husband during the first two seasons and the sixth. She seems to display little or no maternal instinct towards her daughter, credited due to a childhood where she suffered humiliations from her parents. Her political positions are described as socially compassionate and fiscally moderate. Louis-Dreyfus has received widespread critical acclaim for her performance, winning a record-breaking six Primetime Emmy Awards and three Screen Actors Guild Awards, and receiving five consecutive Golden Globe nominations.

=== Amy Brookheimer ===
- Anna Chlumsky as Amy Brookheimer:

The Vice President's Chief of Staff. She credits herself as the vice president's "trouble-shooter, problem-solver, issue-mediator, doubt-remover, conscience-examiner, thought-thinker and all-round everything-doer". Amy is constantly sacrificing her own reputation to save Selina's political credibility. She is known to be uptight and overly dedicated to her career, unwilling to settle down and have children, much to the dismay of her family. She has romantic history with Dan, and may still have feelings for him. She has a few different boyfriends throughout the series, including a fundraiser for Selina and a Western politician. Amy becomes Selina's campaign manager during her presidential run, but resigns as a result of the brief appointment of an equivocating, yet omnipresent, old friend of Selina's to the campaign team. She rejoins the Meyer team when a tie in the general election leads to a statewide recount in Nevada. At the end of season 6 it is revealed that after a one-night stand with Dan, she is pregnant with his child. However, she gets an abortion in Season 7, mainly due to Dan's inability to settle down. After being sidelined in Meyer's 2020 election campaign, she becomes the manager of Jonah Ryan's rival campaign, encouraging his populist platform (inasmuch as it would have denied Meyer the presidency). She is later punished by Meyer by having to serve under her previous role as the vice president's chief of staff to Jonah Ryan. Chlumsky previously portrayed a similar character, Liza Weld, in Iannucci's 2009 film, In the Loop. She has received five consecutive Primetime Emmy Award nominations for her performance.

=== Gary Walsh ===
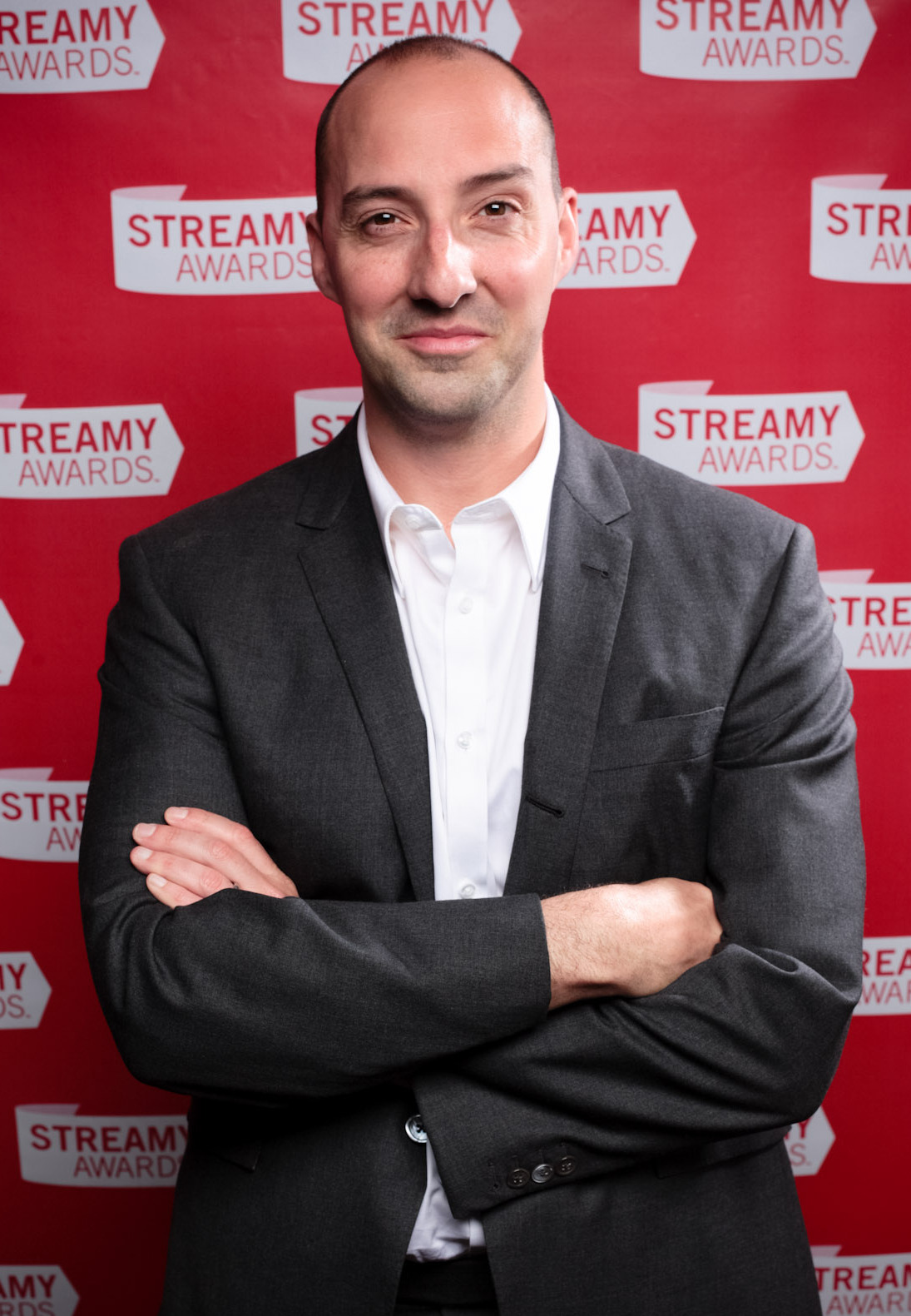
Tony Hale, who portrays Gary Walsh.

- Tony Hale as Gary Walsh:

Selina's personal aide and body man. A long-term associate and confidant of Selina, Gary is portrayed as incredibly loyal and devoted. Gary states he has a bachelor's in hotel management from Cornell University. In the fourth and fifth seasons, Gary is portrayed as having issues adapting to Selina's presidency, since he can no longer be as close to her as previously, due to lack of security clearance. When Selina fails to win reelection, he remains on as her personal aide. Hale describes Gary's loyalty to Selina stemming from the idea that the character "is one of those guys who never really had an identity. He attached himself to people to find who he was." Hale received two Primetime Emmy Awards for his performance on the series, with three further nominations.

=== Dan Egan ===
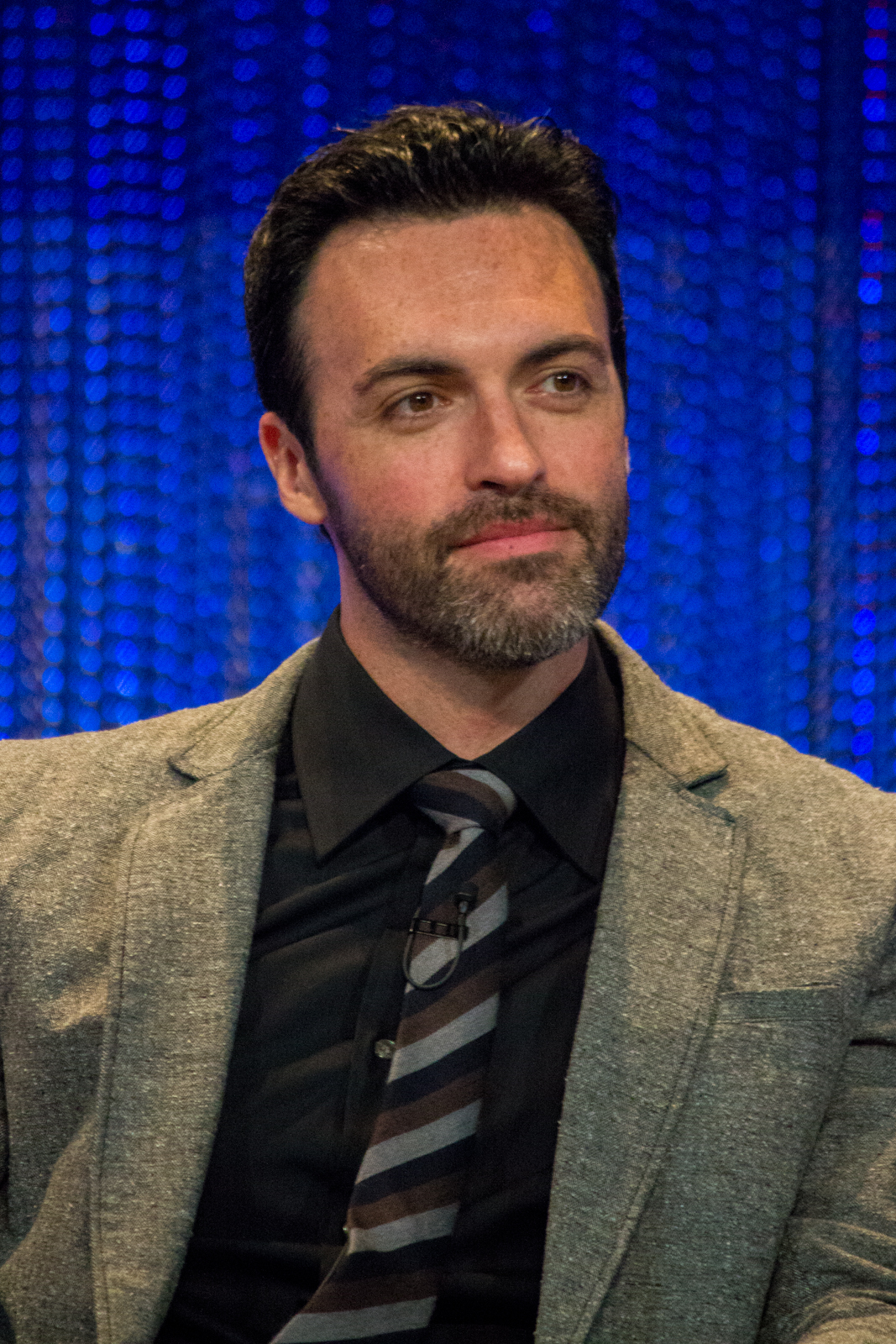
Reid Scott, who portrays Dan Egan.

- Reid Scott as Dan Egan:

The deputy director of communications in the vice president's office, Dan is a highly ambitious, cutthroat up-and-comer in D.C. who takes pride in his contacts and networking skills. He has dated the daughters of influential politicians to get ahead in his career. He often butts heads with Amy, whom he previously dated (and it is suggested he may still have feelings for her). He has a brief stint as Selina's campaign manager for her presidential campaign but is fired from that position after having a nervous breakdown following several crises. He resumes his post in Communications but is fired as a scapegoat amid a data-theft scandal. After briefly working unsuccessfully as a lobbyist and as a CNN analyst, he returns to the campaign staff, as a senior campaign official. When Selina fails to win reelection, Dan goes to work at CBS. In Season 7, he joins Selina's new reelection campaign. However, after being dismissed once again, he falls back on state-level politics, inserting himself as chief of staff to Richard Splett in the various offices he holds in Iowan politics. After being fired by Splett to secure his nomination as Meyer's Secretary of Agriculture, Egan abandons politics to pursue a career in real estate.

=== Jonah Ryan ===
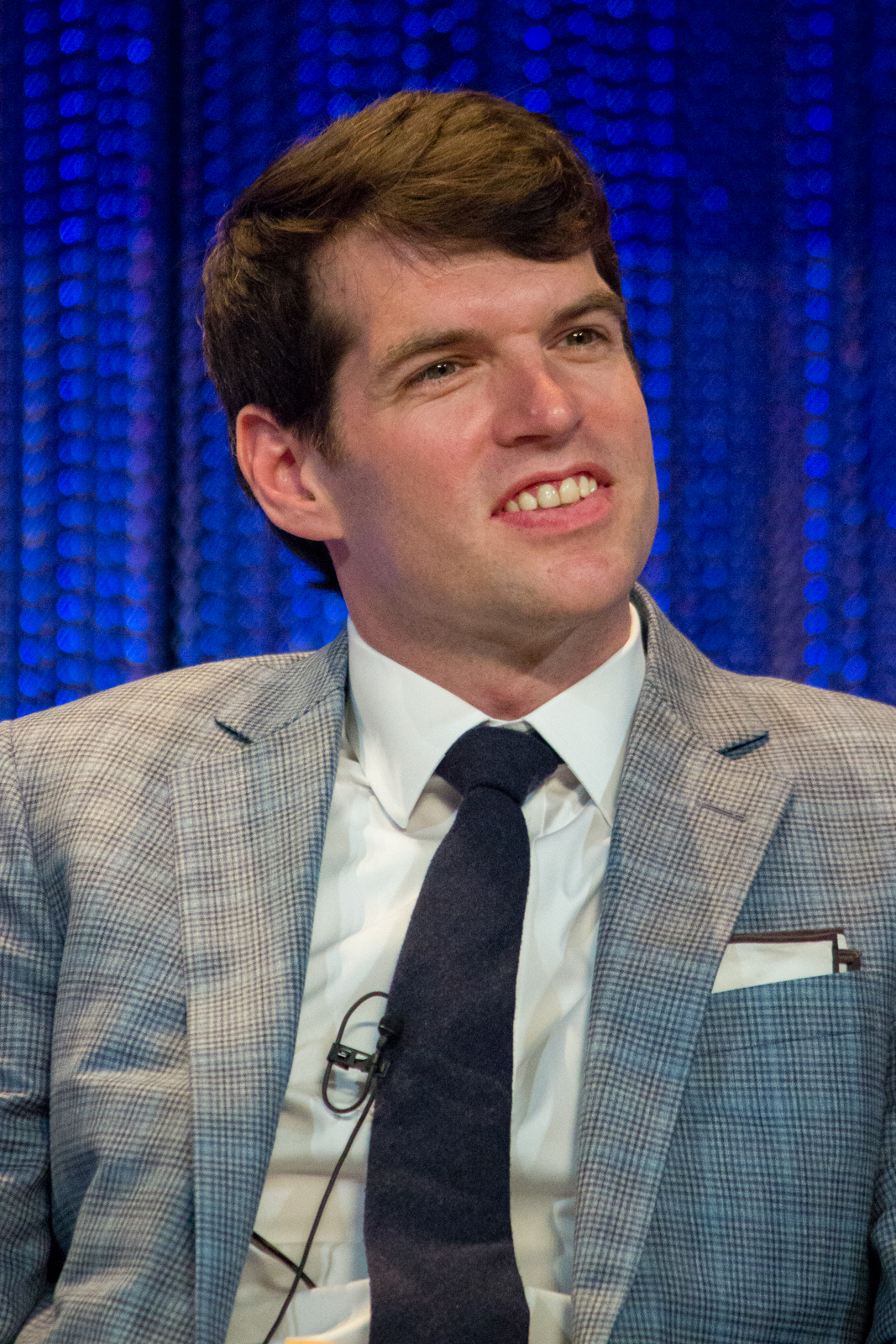
Timothy Simons, who portrays Jonah Ryan.

- Timothy Simons as Jonah Ryan:

The White House liaison to Vice President Meyer's office, he constantly clashes with most members of the Veep's office, particularly Amy. It is shown that he is disliked by everyone he encounters, even foreign politicians. In the third season, he is temporarily fired from the White House for running a blog disclosing insider information, leading him to create his own news website, Ryantology. In season four, he works again as a liaison, this time between President Meyer and Vice President Doyle. He later works for the Meyer general election campaign, until a New Hampshire congressman dies. He is then drafted to run for that seat in order to secure Meyer's vote in the contingent election. He is elected and becomes a congressman, appointing Richard as his chief of staff; as he begins his congressional term, he is diagnosed with testicular cancer and undergoes treatment, entering remission by Season 6. According to Matt Walsh, Jonah Ryan was originally envisioned by the show's writers as "just a fat, short, heavy smoker", but was changed to his current characterization after Simons auditioned for the role. After the end of his disastrous congressional career, Ryan runs for president in 2020 on a nativist, populist platform. However, he is later appointed as Meyer's running mate, becoming vice president thereafter before being impeached in office. In 2020, he married his former step-sister who was later revealed to be his biological half-sister.

=== Mike McLintock ===
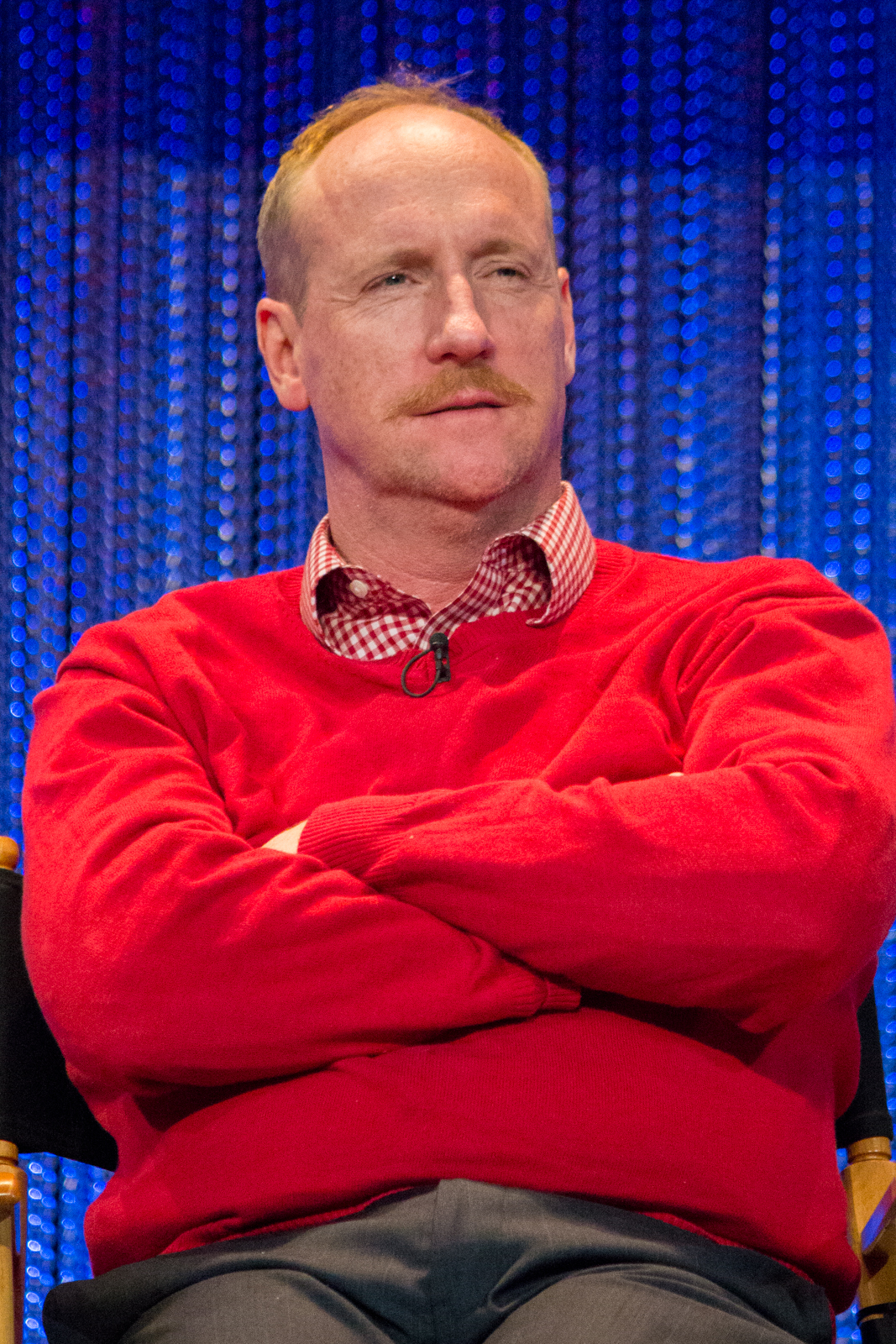
Matt Walsh, who portrays Mike McLintock.

- Matt Walsh as Mike McLintock:

The vice president's director of communications. Mike has served as her communications director since her tenure as senator from Maryland. His career dedication is often questionable, to the extent where he pretends to have a pet dog so he can escape from work commitments. The other characters in the show often mock his lack of ambition, suggesting that he's reached the peak of his career. He is often portrayed as lacking the skills required for the job. In the third season, he marries a reporter named Wendy Keegan. In Season 4, Mike becomes the White House Press Secretary. In Season 5, Mike and Wendy attempt to adopt a baby. They ultimately adopt a Chinese toddler, and also have twins via a surrogate. In Season 6, he is employed by Selina to write her biography A Woman First but causes a scandal soon after its publication whereby the true nature of the Meyer Administration was revealed due to him leaving the diary he used for research at the offices of The Washington Post. After being denied a position within the 2020 Meyer campaign, Mike returns to a career in journalism with his podcast "McLinTalk". His podcast is adopted as a segment on CBS albeit only for its (unintended) comedic value, with McLintock gaining the status of a veteran anchor by 2045. Walsh has received two Primetime Emmy Award nominations for his performance.

=== Sue Wilson ===
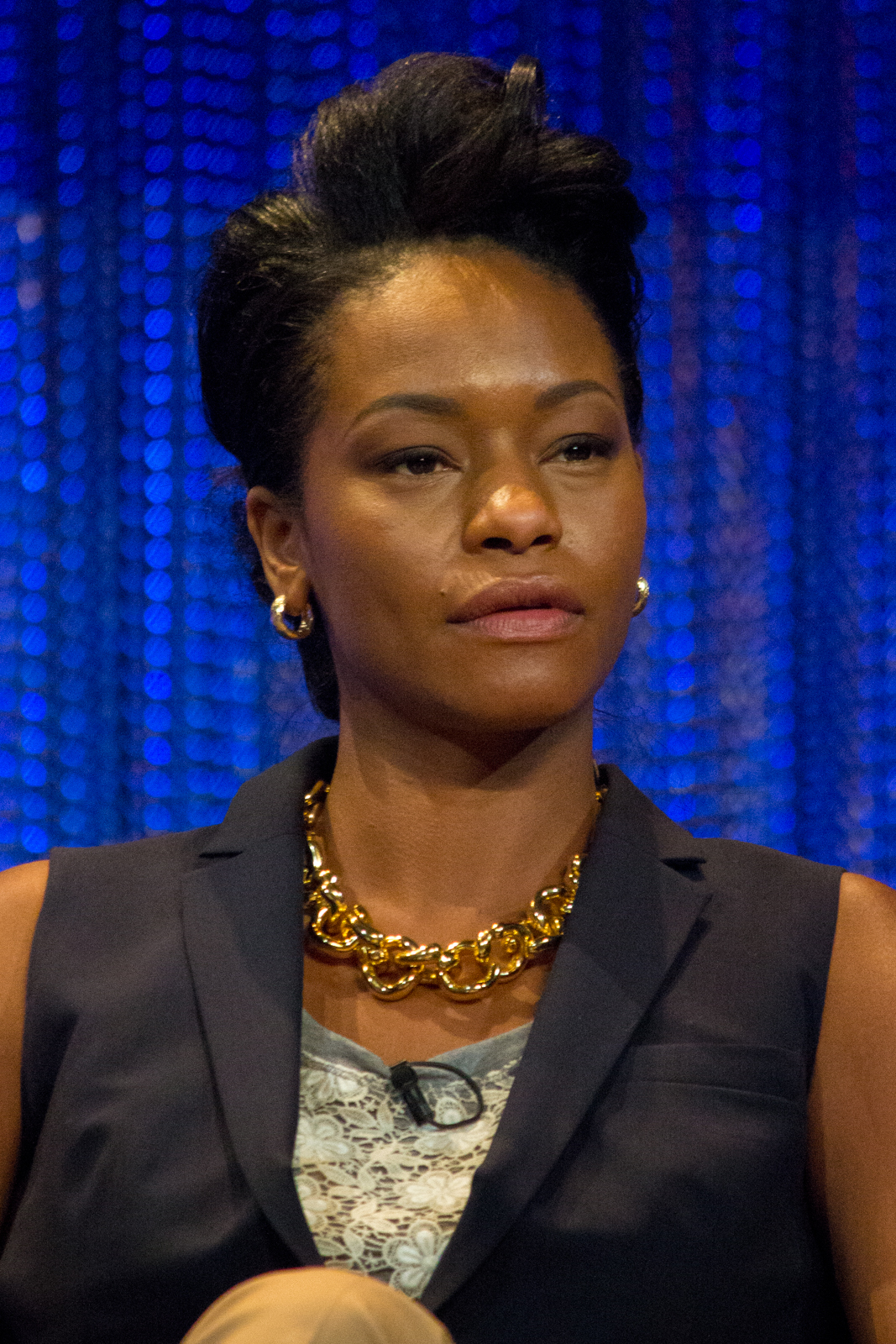
Sufe Bradshaw, who portrays Sue Wilson.

- Sufe Bradshaw as Sue Wilson:

The vice president's personal secretary. A direct and no-nonsense personality, Sue boasts she is the third most important person in the world, as she is the one who arranges for people to see Selina, the second most important person in the world. During a committee inquiry into Selina's office, the chairperson states that Sue "could organize the D-Day landings and still have time for Iwo Jima." Sue becomes the Chief of Scheduling for the White House in Season 4. She remains in that capacity when President Montez is inaugurated, and when Meyer is re-elected in 2020. Bradshaw based her character on that of a DMV employee, elaborating that, "DMV workers are strait-laced and go by the book, and they don't have much time because there's so much to do in a day." (Seasons 1–5; cameoed season 7)

=== Ben Cafferty ===
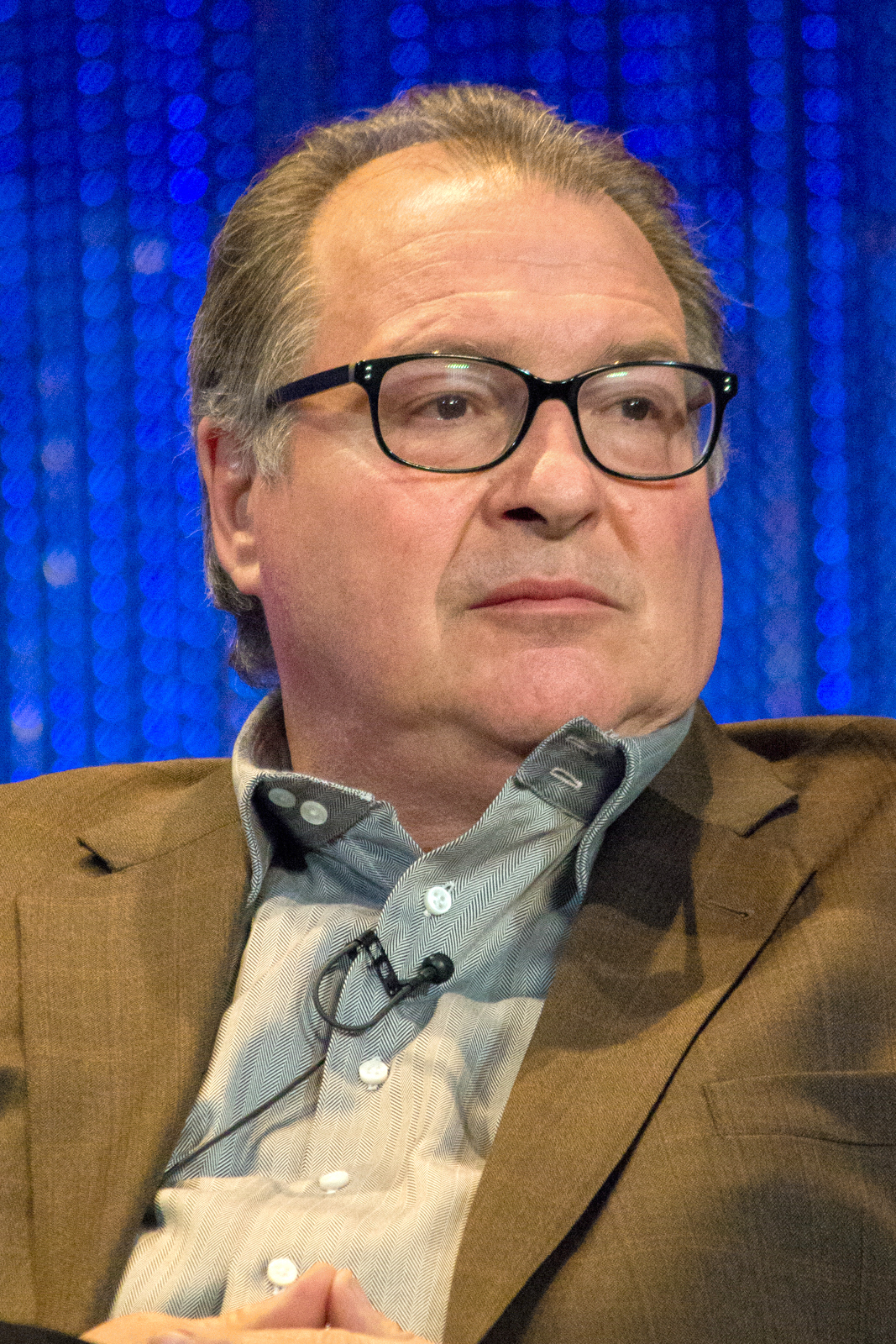
Kevin Dunn, who portrays Ben Cafferty.

- Kevin Dunn as Ben Cafferty:

The White House Chief of Staff, under both the unseen former president and President Meyer. Although he is depressed and a high-functioning alcoholic, he is often very insightful and is treated with respect and even fear throughout Washington. Ben shows little regard for his co-workers or his job, and appears to love his nine-cup coffee thermos more than anything else. Selina refers to him as a "burned-out loser", but he apparently considers her a close friend and resolves to help her become president. Though he was planning on leaving the White House imminently, he agrees to remain with the administration indefinitely. When Selina fails to win reelection, he joins Congressman Ryan's staff with Kent. (Seasons 3–7; recurring season 2)

=== Kent Davison ===
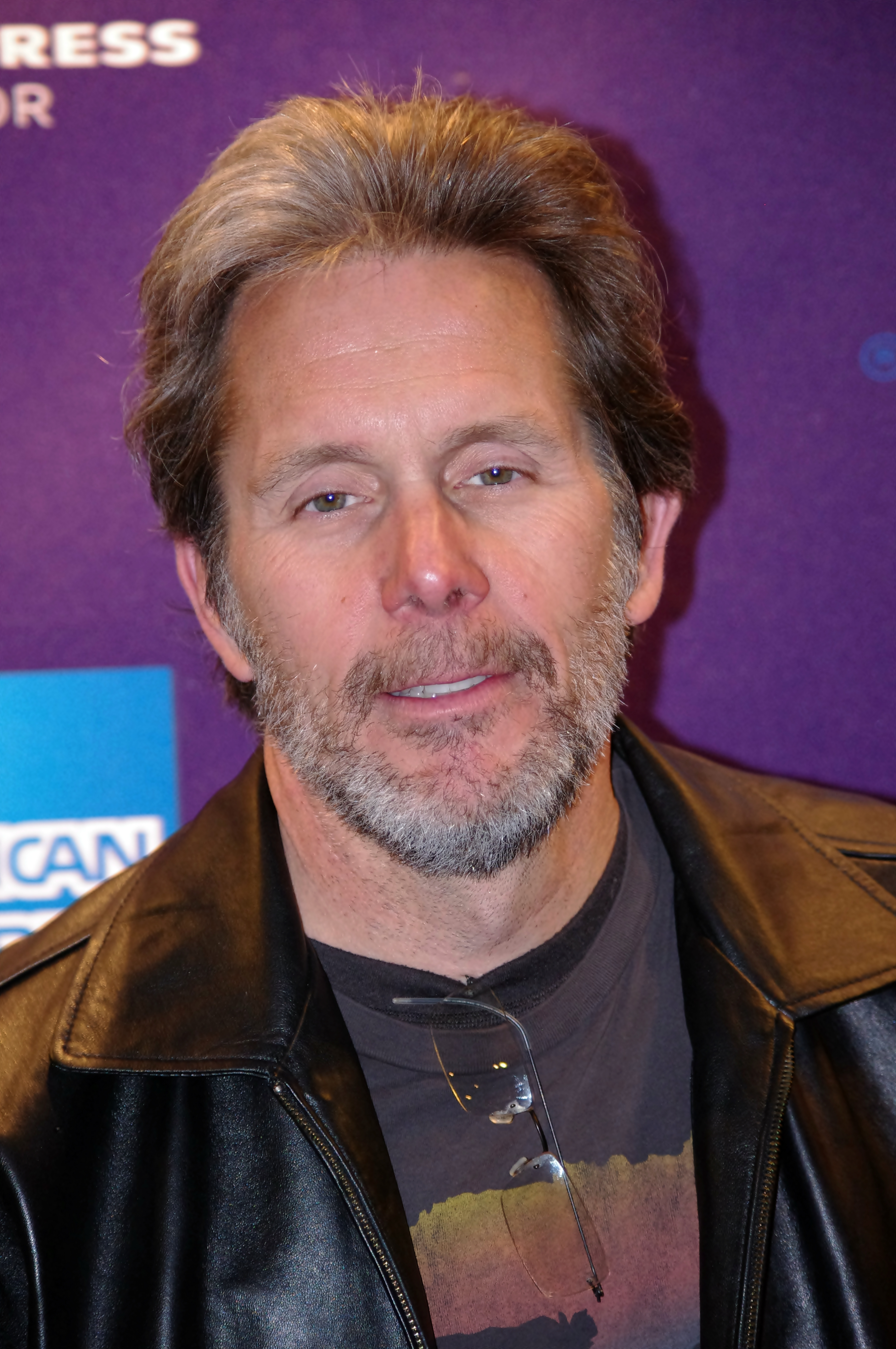
Gary Cole, who portrays Kent Davison.

- Gary Cole as Kent Davison:

The Senior Strategist to the president, under both the unseen former president Hughes and later President Meyer. He is a number-cruncher, and is often referred to as being cold and robotic. His obsession with polling statistics is shown to negatively influence the President's decision-making during several episodes in the second season. Kent is also focused on the public images of Selina and Catherine. It is implied that he and Sue are in some form of ersatz relationship. Although Selina initially dislikes him, she comes to appreciate his useful polling and statistical data, and he becomes a key part of her Presidential administration. When Selina fails to win reelection, he joins Congressman Ryan's staff with Ben. He becomes Chief Strategist within Meyer's 2020 campaign but abandons politics entirely when Meyer decides to appoint Ryan as her running mate due to distribution of delegates at their party's brokered convention. Cole has received a Primetime Emmy Award nomination for his performance. (Seasons 4–7; recurring seasons 2–3)

=== Richard Splett ===
- Sam Richardson as Richard Splett:

An amiable, if not always completely competent, campaign aide who fills in for Gary during Selina's book tour, later becoming Amy's assistant on Selina's presidential campaign, and then briefly Jonah's personal assistant. Splett is cheerful and often the butt of jokes. In Season 5, Selina promotes Richard after discovering that one of his doctorates is in political science with a concentration in electoral law (the other is in veterinary medicine). As part of Richard's promotion, Jonah becomes his assistant. When Jonah is elected to Congress, Richard becomes his chief of staff. Richard makes many allusions to his blog, splettnet.net. After losing the presidency, Selina hires him to be her chief of staff for the Meyer Fund. In season 6, he serves as a sperm donor to Catherine and Marjorie in the conception of their son, also called Richard. Over the course of season 7, Splett meteorically rises in his political career, serving as the mayor of Lurlene, Iowa (his hometown), Lieutenant Governor and Governor of Iowa and US Secretary of Agriculture under Meyer, before being elected President in 2040 (Seasons 4–7; recurring Season 3).

=== Catherine Meyer ===
- Sarah Sutherland as Catherine Meyer:

Selina's reserved, put-upon daughter. Catherine is often caught in the middle of Selina's issues, especially with her father. She is shown as generally unable to gain her mother's respect or attention. She tends to have highly liberal views concerning social justice. During the first four seasons, she is a student at Vassar College and majors in film. She briefly attracts attention for dating a Persian student. Later, she dates and becomes engaged to a lobbyist who her mother does not like. Selina initiates the demise of their relationship by declaring they have broken up during an inquiry into her administration. Catherine goes along with the breakup to protect her mother's administration. She is seen in the fifth season to be filming a documentary based on the unprecedented Electoral College tie that concludes Selina's Presidential run, and becomes romantically involved with her mother's bodyguard and lookalike, Marjorie. The two subsequently marry. In Season 6 finale, she gives birth to a son conceived through Richard through artificial insemination, after whom her and Marjorie's son is named. In the final season, she suffers from postpartum depression. She appears to finally break ties with her mother when Selina uses Catherine's wedding to Marjorie to escape prosecution by the International Criminal Court and then promises to outlaw same sex marriage to gain enough support to win her party's nomination for president. She is last seen cheerfully offering margaritas to her wife and son as her mother's funeral is broadcast on television. (Season 7; recurring seasons 2–6; guest season 1)

=== Marjorie Palmiotti ===
- Clea DuVall as Marjorie Palmiotti:

Selina's bodyguard and lookalike. She later resigns when she begins a relationship with Catherine. In season 7, she and Catherine get married in Norway. She now serves as director of the Meyer Fund. (Season 7; recurring seasons 5–6)

=== Beth Ryan ===
- Emily Pendergast as Beth Ryan:

Jonah's wife, introduced in the last season. She plays the part of the stereotypical politician's wife, often matter-of-factly going along with Jonah's antics as he runs for president. She is Jonah's ex-step-sister but it is later revealed through Jonah's birth certificate that they are in fact half-siblings (Season 7)

== Recurring characters ==
=== Personal characters ===
- Andy Buckley as Ted Cullen: Selina's former lover. (Season 1)
- Zach Woods as Ed Webster: Amy's boyfriend who is often neglected in favor of her job. Woods also appeared in In the Loop as a State Department aide who was a rival to Chlumsky's character. (Seasons 2–3)
- Jessica St. Clair as Dana: Gary's over-possessive girlfriend. She wants to move abroad and begin a cheese business with Gary, who declines at Selina's request. She has not been seen or mentioned since season 3. (Seasons 2–3)
- David Pasquesi as Andrew Meyer: Selina's ex-husband and occasional lover. He is disliked by Selina's staff, primarily for being one of her weaknesses. He is shown to have frequently cheated on Selina over the course of their on-off relationship. In order to not testify as part of a plea deal in regards to the Meyer Fund, Selina arranges for him to flee the country but unintentionally orders his murder. However, he is shown to have survived, attending Selina's funeral in 2045 (Seasons 2–3, 5–7)
- Kathy Najimy as Wendy Keegan: a reporter and Mike's wife. In the fifth season, she attempts to have a baby with Mike via adoption and surrogacy, backfiring and resulting in them having three children. (Seasons 3–7)
- John Slattery as Charlie Baird Jr.: A Wall Street executive with whom Selina becomes romantically entangled. After Leon West breaks the story that they have slept together, the two engage in a somewhat-forced courtship. He develops a close bond with Gary. He is described as being extremely affluent, and is a major benefactor to many museums. After he had slept with Selina but prior to their dating, her general election opponent Senator O'Brien had offered him the position of Secretary of the Treasury should he win. He later accepts the same position from President Montez upon her surprise win. (Season 5)

=== Politicians ===
==== House of Representatives ====
- Dan Bakkedahl as Congressman Roger Furlong: an ambitious Ohio Congressman and ranking member of a congressional oversight committee. Ill-mannered and foul-mouthed, he constantly hounds the vice president's office and threatens investigations, even after he loses his campaign to be Governor of Ohio. Despite this, however, Furlong supports Selina's presidential campaign by helping her prepare for a primary debate and doing post-debate "spin" on her behalf. In Season 6, he becomes the House Minority Leader. In Season 7, he is chairman of the party. (Seasons 1–7)
- Nelson Franklin as Will: Congressman Furlong's aide. He is often subjected to vulgar verbal abuse from Furlong. The Congressman often makes him say demeaning things for his own amusement. Although he never says anything resembling a kind word to him, Furlong is seen to treat Will and his wife to an expensive dinner in Season 5 (albeit by stealing Mike McLintock's dinner reservation) and have them over to his house in Season 6, suggesting heavily veiled appreciation for his aide. In contrast to being the subject of Furlong's verbal abuse, Will is shown to be on amiable terms with anyone that Furlong happens to be talking with at the time. Will mentioned that he has assisted Furlong since he was fifteen. (Season 1–7)
- David Rasche as Speaker Jim Marwood: Marwood serves as the Speaker of the House of Representatives, who ends up in league with Tom James and attempts to deliver him the presidency by refusing to hold another House vote, though their actions inadvertently lead Laura Montez to be elected. (Seasons 2; 4–6). Rasche also appeared in In the Loop as an American official.
- Paul Fitzgerald as Congressman Owen Pierce: a socially awkward congressman and previously one of Selina's rivals for the presidential nomination. He is described as completely incompetent. He holds great respect for President Meyer, and helps her swing a vote against his own wishes to protect her, possibly in exchange for an ambassadorship (likely to an Anglophonic nation, although he personally wishes to be posted to France). (Seasons 3–4)

==== Senate ====
- Phil Reeves as Secretary Andrew Doyle: Vice President under President Meyer, originally a senator and chairman of the Senate Intelligence Committee. While serving as her vice president, he finds himself sidelined in a similar way as she had been by the former president, and Selina continually dismisses using him as an asset during her tenure in office. As vice president, he enlists Jonah as a liaison to the office of the president, asking him to be his "eyes and ears" in the West Wing. When Selina becomes her party's nominee, he declines to be Selina's running mate due to how he'd been treated as vice president, and steps off the ticket, but is forced to cite his reason as "prostate issues". In Season 5, Selina requires favors of Doyle when she is unavailable to appear in front of the press due to an eye-lift, and he strikes a deal to receive the office of the Secretary of State when she is elected, but Selina later promises Michigan Congressman Paul Graves the same position. Doyle hears about this and gets his revenge when he casts a deciding vote in the Senate hearing to determine the presidency. This gifts the Oval Office to Laura Montez instead of Tom James, which would've reinstated Selina as vice president, and in return President Montez appoints Doyle as Secretary of State. (Season 1–7)
- Patton Oswalt as Teddy Sykes: the Chief of Staff to Vice President Doyle. He sexually harasses Jonah and a number of female White House staff. In season 7, he is a registered sex offender, but has also become Jonah's campaign manager after lying that he underwent chemical castration. He later resigns on principle after Ryan's nativist turn. (Seasons 4–7)
- Brad Leland as Senator Bill O'Brien: an Arizona senator who is Selina's opponent in her presidential bid. He is described as a right-wing socially and fiscally conservative politician. (Seasons 1–2, 4–5)
- Hugh Laurie as Senator Tom James: a charming senator and Selina's new running mate after Doyle leaves the ticket. He served as a representative and senator from Connecticut. He is extremely popular with his colleagues and with voters. James is described as socially compassionate and fiscally moderate. Selina was reluctant to pick him as a running mate out of fear that he would remember a time they nearly slept together. He frustrates Meyer at his desire to be involved with the economy, going so far as to request to serve simultaneously as Vice President and Secretary of the Treasury. In the general election, loophole rules in the Constitution dictate that in certain circumstances, James could become the Acting President (and subsequently President), further angering Selina. He offers that, should this occur, he would like her to be his vice president. She later appoints him as her economy czar after he had asked to serve as Treasury Secretary in addition to being Vice President. He competed in the 2020 primaries against Meyer amongst others, but withdrew, only to try and clinch their party's nomination at a brokered convention; his political career ended after Meyer pressured his campaign manager into making public his sexual impropriety towards her. Before the fourth season, Armando Iannucci met with Laurie in the UK after learning that he was a fan of Veep. The two began developing the character Tom James alongside the show's writers (also based in the UK). Iannucci describes Tom James as a "normal, but ambitious operator ... this is someone who seems to outdo [Selina Meyer] in his ability." (Seasons 4–7)
- Andrea Savage as President Laura Montez: Originally a senator from New Mexico, she becomes Senator Bill O'Brien's running mate in the presidential election. When there is a tie in the electoral college, a deadlock in the House of Representatives, and another tie in the Senate, Doyle ultimately votes for her, and she becomes president. President Montez is inaugurated in the season 5 finale, "Inauguration." Montez immediately accepts credit for Selina's efforts to free Tibet, and later comes under harsh criticism when this is revealed later in her presidency. She does not win reelection and is succeeded by Selina as president (although this is the result of Chinese election interference in collusion with the Meyer campaign). Several years later, she makes an appearance at Selina's funeral and her extensive plastic surgery is remarked upon. Even though her maiden name is Cunningham and she was raised in Cleveland, Montez pronounces her first name with a Spanish accent and frequently uses Spanish words in regular conversation, leading Selina to imply that Montez is pretending to be Latina for political reasons. (Season 5–7)
- Toks Olagundoye as Senator Kemi Talbot, who Selina describes as a protege and considers as a running mate in her third run for the presidency. She ultimately enters the race against Meyer. She later served as president from 2033 to 2041, becoming a successful two-term president, delivering the main eulogy at Meyer's funeral in 2045. (Season 7)

==== Other politicians ====
- Randall Park as Minnesota Governor Danny Chung: a young veteran who is not shy about exploiting his military record for political gain. A member of the president's party, he covets the presidency himself and is seen as Selina's chief rival for the nomination after the president leaves office. A running gag is that Chung never appears on television without mentioning his military record. Selina offers him the position of running mate, but he declines. He is subsequently revealed to participate regularly in a Gilbert and Sullivan group along with Richard. (Season 1–6)
- Isiah Whitlock, Jr. as General George Maddox: the former Secretary of Defense and one of Selina's rivals for the presidential nomination. He appears to bear an unusually high degree of personal animosity towards Selina. He is forced to suspend his campaign after being unable to compete on the debate stage. When she secures her party nomination, she offers him the position of running mate, but rescinds the offer. (Seasons 2–4)
- Diedrich Bader as Bill Ericsson: a high-profile campaign official, formerly the campaign manager for Joe Thornhill. He later abandons Thornhill, and Selina appoints him her new Director of Communications. When a scandal breaks that the Meyer campaign used stolen confidential medical data to send flyers appealing to bereaved parents of deceased children, the core characters band together to scapegoat him in their place, resulting in his imprisonment. His sentence is later overturned on appeal and he turns against Selina, claiming he is "consumed" by desire to destroy her. He briefly served as a member of Jonah Ryan's presidential campaign team before resigning on principle. (Seasons 3–7)
- Glenn Wrage as Joe Thornhill: a former Major League Baseball coach and one of Selina's rivals for the presidential nomination. He constantly uses sports analogies to describe politics, something which greatly annoys Selina and her staff. Despite a good early start in the primaries, he later loses momentum in the race. (Season 3)
- Martin Mull as Bob Bradley: Selina's folksy, out-of-touch political advisor with a long history in politics. Ben Cafferty describes Bradley as his mentor. Selina recruits him to help with the recount in Nevada after the electoral college tie, but it is revealed that Bradley is extremely senile. His nickname is "The Eagle". (Season 5)
- Peter MacNicol as Jeff Kane: An AARP lobbyist and influential political power broker in New Hampshire, and Jonah Ryan's uncle. He selects Jonah as a candidate for congress and is wholly responsible for getting him elected, remarking he could get "a Muslim AIDS virus" elected in New Hampshire. He frequently berates Jonah and is highly amused by his misfortunes, even laughing hysterically at the funeral for Jonah's father. He is one of the few people to recognize Richard Splett's political talent early on, expressing a desire to make him president (the final episode reveals Splett later became a highly respected two-term president). Another actor appeared as Jeff Kane in an uncredited appearance in the Season 3 finale, "New Hampshire". (Seasons 5–7)
- Usman Ally as Mohammed bin Nasser bin Khalifa Al Jaffar: The Ambassador of Qatar to the United States. He becomes a love interest for Selina, although their relationship is severed due to their racial differences. After Selina loses the presidency, they reunite and happily pursue a romantic and diplomatic relationship. Selina reluctantly breaks up with him before announcing her presidential campaign after being advised the relationship would hurt her politically. (Seasons 5–6)
- Matt Oberg as Governor Buddy Calhoun (D-Nevada): Former State Secretary of Nevada and opposing candidate for the presidential nomination. After a brief relationship in Season 5, he announces his engagement to Amy in Season 6, although this ended after he announced his intention to withdraw from the Nevada gubernatorial election to focus on her. He later reappears running for the party nomination for president in 2020, before agreeing to be Selina's Secretary of Education and giving her his delegates in exchange for her promise to ban same-sex marriages. (Season 5-7)

=== Other characters ===
- Peter Grosz as Sidney Purcell: an oil lobbyist. Purcell attempts to gain power through the Meyer Vice Presidency via her environmental regulation committee. When Dan is fired, he works as a lobbyist for Purcell, who in turn ends up firing him as well. He joined forces with Tom James, who was secretly in his pocket as a lobbyist, to deny Meyer the presidency in a House vote. He is later arrested for bribing members of the Iowa State Government and State Legislature whilst acting as a lobbyist for a pesticide company. (Seasons 1–2, 4–5, 7)
- Brian Huskey as Leon West: a veteran political reporter who frequently antagonizes Mike at briefings. He is later taken hostage in Iran, and Selina must retrieve him on a goodwill mission, although he is antagonized after learning that he was detained a day longer than necessary for publicity. In the Season 6 finale, it appears Leon has taken on Mike's role, much to everybody's glee. (Seasons 1–7)
- Sally Phillips as Minna Häkkinen: the former Prime Minister of Finland. She first meets Selina on a state visit in the wake of an anti-Europe gaffe on Selina's part. She later holds a position with the International Monetary Fund, where she impresses enough world leaders that she now seems to work as a back-channel diplomat. She is known for being blunt about personal issues, taking things literally, socially awkward and clueless about the vitriol of American politics. (Season 2–3, 5–7)
- William L. Thomas as Martin Collins: a Secret Service agent reassigned for laughing in Selina's presence. (Seasons 1–3)
- Jessie Ennis as Leigh Patterson: a competent and straightforward staffer for Selina, whose name is constantly misremembered by her and the rest of the White House staff. After she is scapegoated for the security breach that revealed the personal information of a child diagnosed with HIV, Lea reveals that the Meyer campaign used stolen confidential medical data to appeal to bereaved parents, and testifies against the Meyer administration. (Season 4)
- Lennon Parham as Karen Collins: an old university friend of Selina, whom she hired as a consultant and afterwards as a lawyer during the Nevada recount. She stands out by failing to make definite statements, repeating what others say and receiving credit from Selina, and consequently doesn't seem to be able to give good advice, annoying all other staff members. (Seasons 4–5, 7)
- Margaret Colin as Jane McCabe: long-time anchor of CBS This Morning. In season 6, after spreading rumors she and Dan were sleeping together, she is relegated to CBS's digital content platform following a sexual harassment filing, but is later restored to her presenting job after Dan is similarly demoted. She is later seen covering the primaries and the party convention. (Seasons 6–7)
- Paul Scheer as Stevie: a news producer of CBS This Morning. (Seasons 6–7)
- Rhea Seehorn as Michelle York: Tom James' deputy campaign manager and secret lover. To stop James from becoming their party's presidential nominee at the 2020 brokered convention, Selina pressures her into reporting the relationship to the press as exploitative. She subsequently becomes Meyer's new chief of staff. (Season 7)
- Andy Daly as Keith Quinn: Selina's 2020 campaign manager. Originally hired accidentally from Selina pointing at the wrong person in a picture, he seems a jovial, but naive man who can be of no help. However, he later turns out to have a vastly more cut-throat and devious personality, along with numerous corrupt connections to China that help in Selina's campaign. He later becomes a key advisor to Selina in her presidency. (Season 7)
- Christopher Meloni as Ray Whelans: Selina's personal trainer, with whom she has a sexual relationship during her presidential campaign. He is fired after old, offensive blog posts about fat people becomes a topic of media coverage. (Season 3)
