= Veep season 4 =

Veep
- Season 4
- Official promotional poster
- Showrunner: Armando Iannucci
- Starring: Julia Louis-Dreyfus; Anna Chlumsky; Tony Hale; Reid Scott; Timothy Simons; Matt Walsh; Sufe Bradshaw; Kevin Dunn; Gary Cole; Sam Richardson
- No. of episodes: 10

Release
- Original network: HBO
- Original release: April 12 – June 14, 2015

Season chronology
- ← Previous; Season 3 Next → Season 5

The fourth season of the American political comedy television series Veep premiered on April 12, 2015, on HBO in the United States. It consists of ten episodes each running approximately 28 minutes. The season's showrunner and series creator Armando Iannucci exited at the conclusion of the season.

Season four follows Selina Meyer in the role of President after her predecessor steps down to care for his wife. She attempts to pass a landmark bill supporting working mothers while navigating her presidential campaign, overseen by top campaign manager Bill Ericsson, portrayed by Diedrich Bader. Two of her staffers, Amy and Dan, abruptly exit the White House and begin work as lobbyists. Eventually, Selina is forced to choose a new running mate when Andrew Doyle unexpectedly drops out of the role. She chooses Senator Tom James, played by Hugh Laurie, whose popularity and political machinations come to irk her. After a campaign data breach puts her in jeopardy, Selina's team scapegoats Ericsson. The season finale centers on the night of the election, which concludes with an electoral college tie between Selina and her opponent, Senator Bill O'Brien.

The season received critical acclaim and was assigned a 90/100 on Metacritic. It received five Primetime Emmy Awards, including Outstanding Comedy Series, the second premium cable series to win the award. Julia Louis-Dreyfus received her fourth Primetime Emmy Award for Outstanding Lead Actress in a Comedy Series for Veep, and Tony Hale received his second Primetime Emmy Award for Outstanding Supporting Actor in a Comedy Series.

== Plot ==
The fourth season follows Selina Meyer stepping into the role of president after President Hughes steps down to take care of his depressed wife. Selina's staffers' incompetence ruins her first State of the Union address by failing to load her completed speech on the teleprompter. She is determined to author a bill that will benefit working moms called Families First, although her team advises against it.

Gary struggles with his reduced role as Selina's bag man. Selina confronts Gary for ordering expensive decorations for a state dinner, and they reconcile after a screaming argument.

Her vice president, Andrew Doyle hires a chief of staff, Teddy, who continually sexually harasses Jonah. Jonah eventually reports the behavior and Teddy is fired.

Meanwhile, Amy manages Selina's presidential campaign in an unofficial capacity, and is frustrated when Selina hires the best political campaign manager in Washington, Bill Ericsson. Her campaign catches negative press attention after a data breach reveals the identity of an HIV-positive elementary school student. First a White House aide, Leigh, and then Dan are fired as scapegoats for the data breach. Dan goes to work for Sidney Purcell at a consulting firm.

When Andrew Doyle unexpectedly bows out of her ticket at the party's political convention, Selina's team scrambles to find a new running mate. Amy quits in frustration because of Selina's equivocating friend and new adviser, Karen Collins. After Amy leaves, Selina heeds her suggestion to ask Tom James to be her running mate. It is later revealed that Selina previously had romantic feelings for Tom. Dan gets Amy a job at his consulting firm, but Amy has difficulty managing her anger about her time in the White House.

After Selina's team successfully convinces her that the Families First bill is too big a political liability, they scramble to get the votes needed to make sure it will fail. A flu-ridden Selina directs their activities while sick in bed. Gary publicly meets with Dan and Amy and agrees to pay them to lobby against the bill. The episode "Testimony" depicts the staffers undergoing congressional hearings regarding the campaign's data breach, during which they each scapegoat Bill Ericsson. Selina takes steps to end Catherine's engagement to Jason, a 35-year-old political consultant.

The season finale ("Election Night") follows Selina and her team on election night. Jonah and Richard manage the Meyer-James rally, and Jonah turns his debacle with Teddy into a testicular health awareness campaign. Her running mate, Tom James, requests that she make him Treasury Secretary in addition to vice president if they win. After poor results prompt Selina to nearly concede, she and O'Brien tie for electoral college votes (269 each), which triggers the 20th Amendment and an impending vote by the House of Representatives. The episode discusses the possibility that in the case of another tie, the Senate's selection for vice president would become president, likely to be James.

== Cast and characters ==
=== Main ===
- Julia Louis-Dreyfus as Selina Meyer
- Anna Chlumsky as Amy Brookheimer
- Tony Hale as Gary Walsh
- Reid Scott as Dan Egan
- Timothy Simons as Jonah Ryan
- Matt Walsh as Mike McLintock
- Sufe Bradshaw as Sue Wilson
- Kevin Dunn as Ben Cafferty
- Gary Cole as Kent Davison
- Sam Richardson as Richard Splett

=== Recurring ===
- Sarah Sutherland as Catherine Meyer
- David Pasquesi as Andrew Meyer
- Kathy Najimy as Wendy Keegan
- Dan Bakkedahl as Congressman Roger Furlong
- Nelson Franklin as Will
- David Rasche as Speaker Jim Marwood
- Paul Fitzgerald as Congressman Owen Pierce
- Phil Reeves as Senator Andrew Doyle
- Patton Oswalt as Teddy Sykes
- Brad Leland as Senator Bill O'Brien
- Hugh Laurie as Senator Tom James
- Diedrich Bader as Bill Ericsson
- Peter Grosz as Sidney Purcell
- Brian Huskey as Leon West
- Jessie Ennis as Leigh Patterson
- Lennon Parham as Karen Collins
- Randall Park as Minnesota Governor Danny Chung
- Isiah Whitlock Jr. as General George Maddox

=== Guest ===
- Navid Negahban as Abbas

== Episodes ==
No. overall	No. in season	Title	Directed by	Written by	Original release date	U.S. viewers (millions)
29	1	"Joint Session"	Chris Addison	Story by : Armando Iannucci & Simon Blackwell & Georgia Pritchett; Teleplay by : Simon Blackwell & Georgia Pritchett	April 12, 2015	1.05
Twenty-four hours before Selina's first major speech as President, her staff frantically tries to work out how she can say two completely opposite things (cuts in the military/spending on the Families First bill) at the same time. But just before the speech begins, everything falls apart. The staff adjusts to their new roles in the White House: Gary questions his worth now that he can no longer be close to Selina. Jonah is put off by the hands-on approach of the new VP's chief of staff, Teddy. Amy learns that Bill Ericsson, a rival campaign manager, may make a play for her job. Mike is trying to be healthy.
30	2	"East Wing"	Stephanie Laing	Story by : Armando Iannucci & Kevin Cecil & Roger Drew & Andy Riley; Teleplay by : Kevin Cecil & Roger Drew & Andy Riley	April 19, 2015	0.99
The president's staff prepares for her state visit with the Israeli prime minister. Mike tries out a new look for his more visible role. Teddy does Jonah a favor, while continuing to invade his personal space. Dan and Jonah are participating in Families First talks. Stuck in traffic with Richard, Amy learns via FaceTime that Selina is bringing in Bill Ericsson. Gary goes overboard while planning the state dinner for the Israeli delegation, and a painting in the White House comes under the spotlight. Kent helps Catherine with her likeability. Richard becomes Jonah's assistant.
31	3	"Data"	Becky Martin	Story by : Armando Iannucci & Simon Blackwell & Neil Gibbons & Rob Gibbons; Teleplay by : Simon Blackwell & Neil Gibbons & Rob Gibbons	April 26, 2015	0.98
When the personal details of a previously anonymous girl mentioned by the President are leaked, Selina's team tries to find a scapegoat for the data breach; first Lee, then Dan. Catherine tells Selina she wants to support an anti-bullying campaign. Dan tasks Jonah and Richard with buying fireworks for a campaign rally. While Mike is about to make the dreadful error of announcing the wrong scapegoat at a press conference, the President hosts the annual Easter Egg Roll and reads a story to the assembled kids.
32	4	"Tehran"	Becky Martin	Story by : Armando Iannucci & Ian Martin & Tony Roche; Teleplay by : Ian Martin & Tony Roche	May 3, 2015	0.98
Selina goes to Iran to free detained American reporter Leon West; Dan finds new work at Sidney Purcell's offices after being fired from the White House; Gary and Mike panic as they realize they've been left at the airport in Tehran. Doyle stands in for the president at an LGBTQ+ event; Kent's polling may cause trouble for Selina. Catherine gets engaged to Jason and Selina brings in a new Senior advisor, Karen Collins.
33	5	"Convention"	Stephanie Laing	Story by : Armando Iannucci & Sean Gray & David Quantick; Teleplay by : Sean Gray & David Quantick	May 10, 2015	0.82
Hours before the Party Convention, Selina struggles to find a replacement as Doyle announces he's leaving the ticket, but ultimately chooses Tom James. Meanwhile, Dan recruits Jonah and Richard to pose as influential Washington insiders. Amy is angry with the president's new advisor. Karen gets fired.
34	6	"Storms and Pancakes"	Chris Addison	Story by : Armando Iannucci & Georgia Pritchett & Will Smith; Teleplay by : Georgia Pritchett & Will Smith	May 17, 2015	0.74
Selina is worried when Tom James, her running mate, unknowingly takes her spotlight on the campaign trail due to his popularity; Amy, still bitter from her experience with Selina, gets a job working with Dan and Jonah gets ambushed in a 'job interview'. Selina travels to the wrong state during a hurricane.
35	7	"Mommy Meyer"	Becky Martin	Story by : Armando Iannucci & Roger Drew and David Quantick; Teleplay by : Roger Drew and David Quantick	May 24, 2015	0.98
Selina prepares for a night with some of her old colleagues; Tom accidentally stirs trouble after a shooting in Pittsburgh; Amy and Dan lobby for the concrete industry; An intruder breaks into the White House. Mike tries to sell the press on Selina's Families First bill and because of the intruder, becomes a laughing stock; Jonah and Richard inadvertently reveal the secret of the other data breach in the 'I Care' campaign mails. Ben, Kent, Bill, Mike and Tom James have their weekly Friday night drinks, this time with Richard and Jonah.
36	8	"B/ill"	Becky Martin	Story by : Armando Iannucci & Tony Roche & Andy Riley & Kevin Cecil; Teleplay by : Tony Roche & Andy Riley & Kevin Cecil	May 31, 2015	0.99
In order to get their bill to fail, the staff tries to get Representatives to vote against it; Selina must work while sick in bed; Gary accidentally gets everyone involved in illegal activity, because he sets up a secret meeting with Dan and Amy to persuade them to lobby against the Families First bill in exchange for money.
37	9	"Testimony"	Armando Iannucci	Story by : Sean Gray & Armando Iannucci & Will Smith; Teleplay by : Sean Gray & Will Smith	June 7, 2015	0.91
The staff gives their testimony to find out who exactly was responsible for the two data breaches (HIV girl/campaign mailer) and the lobbying against the Families First Bill. Ultimately, Bill Ericsson is scapegoated; the 'Jonad Files' and the inappropriate touching are explored; Jason and Catherine break up.
38	10	"Election Night"	Chris Addison	Story by : Simon Blackwell & Armando Iannucci & Tony Roche; Teleplay by : Simon Blackwell & Tony Roche	June 14, 2015	1.11
On Election Night, Selina and her staff find their nerves growing frayed as each state result is called. Amy and Dan are on TV discussing the presidential race; Karen Collins returns. Tom James wants to be made Treasury Secretary. Jonah and Richard work at the Meyer-James Rally. Selina is about to concede as the election is tied.

== Production ==
The series creator Armando Iannucci departed as showrunner at the end of the season, "citing the toll producing a series in the U.S. has taken on Iannucci and his London-based family." Additional executive producers for the season were Christopher Godsick, Frank Rich, Chris Addison, Becky Martin, Stephanie Laing, Simon Blackwell, Tony Roche, and Julia Louis-Dreyfus.

Iannucci is credited as story co-writer for every episode. Directors for the season included Addison, Martin, Laing, and Iannucci.

=== Release ===
The first episode of the season aired on April 12, 2015, on HBO and new episodes aired every Sunday until its finale on June 14, 2015.

== Reception ==
Season four of Veep received critical acclaim. It received a 90/100 on review aggregator Metacritic, and a 100% on Rotten Tomatoes with the critical consensus: "Veep shows no signs of slowing down in its fourth season, thanks to sharp, funny, rapid-fire dialogue between POTUS and her hilariously incompetent staff."

Departing creator and showrunner Armando Iannucci was praised for the season by Newsweek, who called it the "funniest season yet." The acting and writing were received well, as in The Hollywood Reporter's review by Tim Goodman: "Veep enters its fourth season firmly established as one of television's best comedies, and then immediately does what seems impossible: It delivers its most thoroughly assured, hilarious and brilliantly written and acted episodes."

Matt Zoller Seitz wrote in Vulture of the titular character's acting: "Louis-Dreyfus is her usual Swiss-watch self, so confident that she seems to glide through her scenes." The comedic duo of Louis-Dreyfus and Tony Hale was also applauded; Ben Travers described them in IndieWire: "The duo’s chemistry continues to drive entire episodes with a few short moments, and if they’re kept apart too long, the rest of the team is there to fill gaps faster than you can spot them."

In a less positive review, Variety's Brian Lowry wrote "The series also remains a bit too precious in sidestepping issues of partisanship, a conceit that has grown somewhat more tolerable over time." David Hinckley of the New York Daily News also noted, "if you don't find awkward funny, you won't get "Veep.""

Veep was called the most accurate depiction of American politics by Dan Pfeiffer for Grantland, who stated that the show captures "the humanity, the banality, and the absurdity" of Washington D.C. He further stated: "The fact that real-life Washington loves the show but often doesn’t seem to truly get the joke may be the show’s most devastating critique of all."

== Awards and nominations ==
67th Primetime Emmy Awards
Category	Nominee(s)	Result	Ref.
Outstanding Comedy Series	Armando Iannucci, Christopher Godsick, Frank Rich, Chris Addison, Simon Blackwell, Tony Roche, Julia Louis-Dreyfus, Stephanie Laing, Kevin Cecil, Roger Drew, Sean Gray, Ian Martin, Georgia Pritchett, David Quantick, Andy Riley, Will Smith and Bill Hill	Won	
Outstanding Lead Actress in a Comedy Series	Julia Louis-Dreyfus	Won	
Outstanding Supporting Actor in a Comedy Series	Tony Hale	Won	
Outstanding Supporting Actress in a Comedy Series	Anna Chlumsky	Nominated	
Outstanding Writing in a Comedy Series	Simon Blackwell, Armando Iannucci, and Tony Roche for "Election Night"	Nominated	
Outstanding Directing for a Comedy Series	Armando Iannucci for "Testimony"	Won	
Outstanding Casting for a Comedy Series	Allison Jones, Pat Moran, and Meredith Tucker	Won	
Outstanding Art Direction for a Contemporary Program (Half-Hour or less)	Jim Gloster, Production Designer; E. David Cosier, Art Director; Jennifer Engel, Set Decorator	Nominated	
Outstanding Sound Mixing for a Comedy or Drama Series (Half-Hour) and Animation	Bill MacPherson and Richard Davey	Nominated	

Award	Category	Nominee(s)	Result	Ref.
Directors Guild of America Awards	Outstanding Directorial Achievement in a Comedy Series	Chris Addison for "Election"	Won	
Critics' Choice Television Award	Best Actress in a Comedy Series	Julia Louis-Dreyfus	Nominated	
Critics' Choice Television Award	Best Comedy Series	Veep	Nominated	
Critics' Choice Television Award	Best Supporting Actor in a Comedy Series	Tony Hale	Nominated	
Golden Globe Awards	Best Actress – Television Series Musical or Comedy	Julia Louis-Dreyfus	Nominated	
Producers Guild of America Awards	Episodic Television Series – Comedy	Armando Iannucci, Chris Addison, Simon Blackwell, Christopher Godsick, Stephanie Laing, Julia Louis-Dreyfus, Frank Rich, Tony Roche, Kevin Cecil, Roger Drew, Sean Gray, Ian Martin, Georgia Pritchett, David Quantick, Andy Riley, Will Smith, and Bill Hill	Nominated	
Satellite Awards	Best Actress – Television Series Musical or Comedy	Julia Louis-Dreyfus	Nominated	
Satellite Awards	Best Television Series – Musical or Comedy	Veep	Nominated	
Screen Actors Guild Awards	Outstanding Performance by a Female Actor in a Comedy Series	Julia Louis-Dreyfus	Nominated	
Screen Actors Guild Awards	Outstanding Performance by an Ensemble in a Comedy Series	Diedrich Bader, Sufe Bradshaw, Anna Chlumsky, Gary Cole, Kevin Dunn, Tony Hale, Hugh Laurie, Julia Louis-Dreyfus, Phil Reeves, Sam Richardson, Reid Scott, Timothy Simons, Sarah Sutherland, and Matt Walsh	Nominated	
Television Critics Association Awards	Individual Achievement in Comedy	Julia Louis-Dreyfus	Nominated	
Writers Guild of America Awards	Best Episodic Comedy	Veep for "Joint Session"	Nominated	
Writers Guild of America Awards	Best Comedy Series	Veep	Won	
