= Testimony (Veep) =

- Veep episode
- Episode no.: Season 4 Episode 9
- Directed by: Armando Iannucci
- Story by: Sean Gray; Armando Iannucci; Will Smith
- Teleplay by: Sean Gray; Will Smith
- Original air date: June 7, 2015
- Running time: 30 minutes

Guest appearances
- Melanie Nicholls-King as Rep. Bennett; Ethan Phillips as Rep. Wallace; David Beach as Rep. Rakes; Juliet Pritner as Rep. Brewer; Jessie Ennis as Leigh Patterson

Episode chronology
| ← Previous "B/ill" | Next → "Election Night" |
- Veep season 4

"Testimony" is the ninth episode of the fourth season of Veep and the 37th episode overall. The episode was written by Sean Gray and Will Smith, and directed by Armando Iannucci. It first aired on June 7, 2015. The plot of this bottle episode follows President Meyer's staff undergoing hearings administered by the House Judiciary Committee regarding her campaign's federal data breach (from third episode of the season, "Data"). They also must testify about allegations that Selina lobbied to kill her own bill, Families First (from the previous episode "B/ill"). She and her staffers scapegoat campaign consultant Bill Ericsson as the mastermind behind the data breach.

Iannucci received a nomination for Outstanding Directing for a Comedy Series at the Primetime Emmy Awards for the episode.

== Synopsis ==
The episode opens on President Selina Meyer (Julia Louis-Dreyfus) giving a press conference in which she denies that she lobbied against her Families First bill.

Several of Selina's associates are shown being sworn in at House Judiciary Committee hearings: ex-staffers, Amy (Anna Chlumsky) and Dan (Reid Scott), are together with White House Aide Jonah (Timothy Simons); Sue (Sufe Bradshaw), her secretary, is alone; Ben (Kevin Dunn), her chief of staff, is alone; and her daughter Catherine (Sarah Sutherland) is in a private deposition. Ben vehemently denies any intent to kill the bill. Amy and Dan state they were consultants hired to lobby people to vote against the bill.

Leigh Patterson (Jessie Ennis), a former White House aide, testifies that she was fired to conceal that someone used a confidential data breach to target bereaved parents for President Meyer's campaign. She states that only President Meyer's campaign consultant, Bill Ericsson (Deidrich Bader), and bag man Gary Walsh (Tony Hale), knew about the data breach while the President did not. Ericsson and Kent (Gary Cole), Selina's campaign manager, appear together before the committee. Ericsson becomes visibly agitated when the committee members state that his name has consistently been brought up. Kent acknowledges that Leigh was fired because she was scapegoated.

Selina, in a deposition, denies any knowledge of the campaign data breach. She refers to Jason, Catherine's fiancé, as a consultant, and the interviewers correct her, noting that he is a lobbyist. Selina lies and states that she thinks that Catherine has split up with Jason and visits Cathrine forcing her to break up with Jason. Sue sits before the committee and denies that Selina had a meeting with Congressman Pierce, who cast the vote that killed the bill. When asked about voice memos, she states that the Press Secretary, Mike McLintock (Matt Walsh), is responsible for them.

The Committee members note a witness saw Mike with Dan, Amy, and Congressman Pierce in the parking lot. Mike states the meeting was by chance. Selina returns to her deposition and states that Catherine has confirmed she broke up with Jason.

Now in a deposition, Gary admits he asked Dan and Amy to lobby against Families First and states that Bill Ericsson paid them for the job. In her deposition, Catherine also states Ericsson was responsible. One by one, each staffer is shown naming Ericsson as the responsible party.

== Production ==
The episode was shot such that every scene appeared as taped footage from the in-story depositions and the congressional hearings. This is a departure from the show's usual cinema vérité style.

== Critical reception ==
"Testimony" received positive critical reception. For Vulture, Daniel Kurland wrote in a review, "'Testimony' is not only one of Veep’s strongest entries...but is also a staggering accomplishment in comedic television in general." Kate Kulzick stated in a review for The A.V. Club, "It will be nice to get back to the show’s usual approach and aesthetic in the finale but "Testimony" is a refreshing and welcome change of pace for the series, giving the team at Veep the chance to flex new comedic muscles and demonstrate how talented, and versatile, they are."

In 2024, Rolling Stone listed "Testimony" as the 47th best TV episode of all time.

=== Awards ===
Outgoing showrunner Armando Iannucci received a nomination for Outstanding Directing for a Comedy Series at the Primetime Emmy Awards for "Testimony".
