= Election Night (Veep) =

- Veep episode
- Episode no.: Season 4 Episode 10
- Directed by: Chris Addison
- Story by: Simon Blackwell; Armando Iannucci; Tony Roche
- Teleplay by: Simon Blackwell; Tony Roche
- Original air date: June 14, 2015
- Running time: 29 minutes

Guest appearances
- Scott Adsit as Greg Hart; Neil Casey as Matty Curtis; Lennon Parham as Karen Collins; Brad Leland as Bill O'Brien; Susan Kelechi Watson as Sue's Friend; Band of Horses as musical guest

Episode chronology
← Previous "Testimony"	Next → "Morning After"
- Veep season 4

"Election Night" is the tenth and final episode of the fourth season of the American television comedy series Veep, and the 38th episode overall. "Election Night" aired on June 14, 2015, on HBO. It was written by Simon Blackwell, Armando Iannucci, and Tony Roche, and directed by Chris Addison. The episode follows the night of the U.S. Presidential Election, in which President Selina Meyer is running against Senator Bill O'Brien. "Election Night" largely takes place in a hotel suite where Selina and her staff are watching the election returns on cable news. At the end of the episode, Selina and O'Brien are tied for electoral votes.

The writers of "Election Night" won a Primetime Emmy Award for Outstanding Writing in a Comedy Series for the episode. The director won an Outstanding Directorial Achievement in a Comedy Series award from the Directors Guild of America.

== Synopsis ==
It's election night and President Selina Meyer (Julia Louis-Dreyfus) is in a hotel suite with her key campaign staffers (Tony Hale, Matt Walsh, Kevin Dunn, and Gary Cole); her running mate, Tom James (Hugh Laurie); and her daughter, Catherine (Sarah Sutherland). They are watching the election returns on CNN, where ex-staffers Amy (Anna Chlumsky) and Dan (Reid Scott) are appearing as political pundits alongside anchor Greg Hart (Scott Adsit) and pollster Matty Curtis (Neil Casey). Her friend, Karen (Lennon Parham), comes to join them at Selina's invitation. Staffers Jonah (Timothy Simons) and Richard (Sam Richardson) are preparing Selina's campaign rally. As each state returns results, Selina anxiously laments her losses. Sue (Sufe Bradshaw) is in the White House with a friend (Susan Kelechi Watson), stating that she will leave politics if Selina loses. During an on-air break, Amy leaves to go watch the election returns with Selina.

After Wisconsin is initially called for her opponent, Senator Bill O'Brien (Brad Leland), the call is rescinded. Shortly after, her team celebrates that Selina has won Colorado. Tom asks to speak to Selina privately, and alone in her bedroom, Tom states that he would like to be treasury secretary as well as vice president. Selina responds angrily but does not refuse.

Sue and Amy arrive in the hotel suite as Pennsylvania is called for O'Brien. Based on the electoral votes, Selina is significantly losing to O'Brien. Tom encourages her not to quit, but Selina states she is ready to concede. As Selina calls O'Brien, Dan calls Mike, who is on his way to the vending machine, to let him know that Pennsylvania was the wrong call. Mike runs back into the hotel suite just in time to prevent Selina from conceding to O'Brien. Then, CNN calls Pennsylvania for Selina.

Jonah calls Kent to ask if Tom can go to the rally but Selina refuses to let him. Fox then calls Washington state for Selina and Ohio for O'Brien. If Selina wins Virginia, they will be tied. No one on staff knows what happens in case of an unprecedented tie.

The staffers read online that each state will get one House vote and the first candidate to receive 26 will win the presidency, and the Senate chooses the vice president. If there is a tie in the House, the vice president-elect will be president, which, in this case would be Tom James. Selina is flabbergasted and begins to cry.

Tom goes to the rally, and when Selina finds out, she angrily runs after him. Selina interrupts Tom onstage and dismisses him to address the audience. On CNN, Dan announces that Selina won Virginia, so the election is officially a tie. Selina begins to recite parts of the "I Have a Dream" speech. Once backstage, Amy calls Dan to request he put in a good word for her at CNN. Tom asks Selina if she would like to be his vice president if he becomes president.

== Critical reception ==
The episode received positive critical reception. Jessica Goldstein rated the episode 5/5 stars for Vulture. In a review for The A.V. Club, Kate Kulzick wrote, "This is Veep firing on all cylinders, each character serviced and contributing to the larger whole with a clear narrative providing plenty of fodder for them to play with. The comedy is informed by character and runs the gamut from subtle reactions in the background to goofy physicality to profanity and rage-fueled takedowns."

=== Accolades ===
Simon Blackwell, Armando Iannucci, and Tony Roche, writers of "Election Night", received a Primetime Emmy Award for Outstanding Writing in a Comedy Series. Chris Addison, the episode's director, won an Outstanding Directorial Achievement in a Comedy Series award from the Directors Guild of America for the episode.
