= Veep season 5 =

Veep
- Season 5
- Official promotional poster
- Showrunner: David Mandel
- Starring: Julia Louis-Dreyfus; Anna Chlumsky; Tony Hale; Reid Scott; Timothy Simons; Matt Walsh; Sufe Bradshaw; Kevin Dunn; Gary Cole; Sam Richardson
- No. of episodes: 10

Release
- Original network: HBO
- Original release: April 24 – June 26, 2016

Season chronology
- ← Previous; Season 4 Next → Season 6

The fifth season of the American political comedy television series Veep debuted on April 24, 2016, on HBO. The season has 10 episodes, each with an approximate runtime of 28 minutes. It was the first season with David Mandel as the showrunner and centers the lead-up to the resolution of the tied presidential election between President Selina Meyer and Senator Bill O'Brien. Veep was renewed for a season six shortly after the first episode debuted.

Selina hires a seasoned political advisor, Bob Bradley, to help her campaign contest the vote tally in Nevada. While Jonah runs a congressional campaign for an open New Hampshire seat, Mike and his wife prepare to adopt a Chinese baby, Selina begins dating a high-profile banker and Catherine reveals a new romantic partner. Her running mate Tom James plots to exploit a Congressional loophole that will secure his election as president. Selina causes an economic crisis when she accidentally tweets about her opponent and blames it on Chinese hackers. After a congressional vote fails to produce a winner, the Senate vote ends in tie broken by Vice President Doyle, who selects O'Brien's running mate, Senator Laura Montez.

The season received critical acclaim. It garnered nominations from the WGA Awards, TCA Awards, and the Saturn Awards, among others. Julia Louis-Dreyfus won her fifth consecutive Primetime Emmy Award for Outstanding Lead Actress in a Comedy Series.

== Plot summary ==
President Meyer continues to govern while she and her team try to leverage the election results in Nevada as their path to victory. A new Secret Service agent, Marjorie, is hired to Selina's detail. Meanwhile, Mike and his wife, Wendy, begin the process of adopting an infant girl from China. Amy rejoins Selina's team to manage the campaign operation in Nevada and after Dan is fired from his lobbying job, Amy hires Dan to help her in Nevada, where Richard is also hired into a leadership role. Selina taps veteran political operative Bob Bradley, "The Eagle", to oversee the Nevada strategy. While in Carson City, Amy and Dan have a flirtatious moment that ends with Dan sleeping with Amy's sister. Amy meets election observer Buddy Calhoun in Nevada and they begin dating.

The stock market crashes after the Election Day tie, so Selina puts Tom James in the unsavory role of economy czar. She meets and begins a relationship with banking magnate Charlie Baird. One day Selina accidentally tweets an insult about Senator O'Brien meant only for Charlie and then blames the Tweet on Chinese hackers. She decides to levy sanctions against China on the advice of Bob Bradley. The team eventually realizes Bob is experiencing some mental confusion and he's removed from his role.

Missing ballots are recovered from Washoe County and Selina brings in her friend Karen Collins to delay the state's certification deadline. However, after the ballots are counted O'Brien is officially declared the winner of Nevada's electoral college votes, as well as the winner of the popular vote. The election will now be voted on by Congress. Jonah's uncle Jeff Kane helps Jonah run for an open New Hampshire congressional seat that will be pivotal for the upcoming vote. His campaign is successful when his opponent runs afoul of the NRA.

Selina's mother, referred to as Mee-Maw, is hospitalized after a stroke. Selina takes her off life support and, though she has largely negative feelings towards her mother, receives a significant bump in favorability polls due to the perception that she is grieving.

At the height of the economic crisis, Selina has to decide between two banks to bail out, one of which belongs to Charlie. He breaks up with her when she decides to bail out the other bank. Amy is put in charge of investigating Politico's claims that someone on Selina's core staff called the President a cunt. The investigation reveals that it was every staffer except Gary. Catherine comes out as a lesbian and reveals that she and Marjorie have fallen in love. The relationship developed while Catherine filmed Selina in the White House for her thesis documentary project (shown in "Kissing Your Sister").

Selina meets with the President of China to negotiate a deal to lift the sanctions. In a positive turn, the talks go well and he promises he is open to a path to independence for Tibet.

Tom James is caught attempting to convince congresspeople to abstain from the upcoming election vote in a maneuver to secure his presidency. After he and Selina have a screaming argument at the White House holiday party, they end up having sex.

Two months after Election Day, the House of Representatives hold the historic vote to break the election tie. Both candidates fail to secure at least 26 votes, sending the decision over to the Senate. This results in yet another tie, broken by sitting Vice President Andrew Doyle. He votes for President O'Brien's running mate Senator Laura Montez. Montez is sworn in at the inauguration and to Selina's further dismay, gets credit for negotiating independence for Tibet.

== Cast and characters ==
=== Main ===
- Julia Louis-Dreyfus as Selina Meyer
- Anna Chlumsky as Amy Brookheimer
- Tony Hale as Gary Walsh
- Reid Scott as Dan Egan
- Timothy Simons as Jonah Ryan
- Matt Walsh as Mike McLintock
- Sufe Bradshaw as Sue Wilson
- Kevin Dunn as Ben Cafferty
- Gary Cole as Kent Davison
- Sam Richardson as Richard Splett

=== Recurring ===
- Sarah Sutherland as Catherine Meyer, Selina's daughter
- Dan Bakkedahl as Congressman Roger Furlong
- Lennon Parham as Karen Collins, a lawyer and Selina's close friend
- Clea DuVall as Marjorie Palmiotti, a member of Selina's Secret Service detail and later, Catherine's girlfriend
- Nelson Franklin as Will, Senator Furlong's top aide
- Mary Catherine Garrison as Sophie Brookheimer, Amy's sister
- Peter Grosz as Sidney Purcell
- Brian Huskey as Leon West
- Hugh Laurie as Senator Tom James, Selina's running mate and at times, her adversary
- Brad Leland as Senator Bill O'Brien, Selina's opponent in the Presidential Election
- Tzi Ma as Lu Chi-Jang, the President of China
- Peter MacNicol as Jeff Kane, a key political operative in New Hampshire and Jonah's uncle.
- Martin Mull as Bob Bradley, "The Eagle," a veteran political operative hired to help Selina with her campaign
- Kathy Najimy as Wendy Keegan, Mike's wife and a fashion journalist
- David Pasquesi as Andrew Meyer, Selina's ex-husband
- Sally Phillips as Minna Häkkinen, the former Prime Minister of Finland and the head of the IMF
- Phil Reeves as Andrew Doyle, the sitting Vice President
- Andrea Savage as Senator Laura Montez
- John Slattery as Charlie Baird, a top banking executive and Selina's love interest

== Episodes ==
| No. overall | No. in season | Title | Directed by | Written by | Original release date | U.S. viewers (millions) |
|---|---|---|---|---|---|---|
| 39 | 1 | "Morning After" | Chris Addison | David Mandel | April 24, 2016 | 1.10 |
The day after the election, Selina begins wooing congressmen before the vote in congress that will decide her presidency, while dealing with a plummeting stock market, a new "stress-pimple" and Chinese hackers. On the night after the election, Selina discovers a possible road to victory in Nevada. Meanwhile, Amy must figure out if she is back or not; Catherine kicks off a behind-the-scenes documentary project; Mike announces that he and Wendy are adopting a baby from China; Dan considers a new career; Richard is proven to be very useful and Cliff returns as Jonah's new assistant. Selina leads a symposium on race which turns bad quickly. Again, Bill Ericsson is scapegoated.
| 40 | 2 | "Nev-AD-a" | Chris Addison | Lew Morton | May 1, 2016 | 1.01 |
Amy, Dan, Jonah and Richard try to win the presidency for Selina in Carson City, Nevada. Back in D.C., Selina brings in respected Washington fixture Bob Bradley, aka "The Eagle", and, after nudging out Tom James on the newly-created banking task force, meets billionaire banker Charlie Baird. Meanwhile, Mike tries to get healthy before his baby arrives but it backfires; Kent investigates Sue's age; Amy and Dan share a charged moment, which is interrupted by her sister, Sophie.
| 41 | 3 | "The Eagle" | Chris Addison | Steve Koren | May 8, 2016 | 0.97 |
Mike must deal with the consequences of Selina's accidental tweet. Feeling usurped by Bob, Amy begins to be troubled by his behavior. At a museum gala, Gary finds himself the belle of the ball. To justify her tweet, Selina's staff use the strike of Chinese hackers. Missing ballots could win Selina the presidency.
| 42 | 4 | "Mother" | Dale Stern | Alex Gregory & Peter Huyck | May 15, 2016 | 0.97 |
A death in Selina's family could lead to a boost in poll numbers as Selina deals with the repercussions of the new Chinese sanctions; Dan and Amy stage a protest just as the recount in Nevada looks more and more grim for the Meyer campaign.
| 43 | 5 | "Thanksgiving" | Chris Addison | Sean Gray & Georgia Pritchett & Will Smith | May 22, 2016 | 0.92 |
On Thanksgiving Day, Selina is forced to go into hiding; a congressional race in New Hampshire could give Selina the presidency; Dan suspects Tom is up to something.
| 44 | 6 | "C**tgate" | Brad Hall | Georgia Pritchett & Will Smith | May 29, 2016 | 0.98 |
Selina must make a difficult decision that could affect her relationship with Charlie, as the U.S. economy is on the verge of a disaster; an article claims someone on the Meyer team called Selina the c-word, and Amy is tasked with finding out who; it later turns out that it was the entire staff; Catherine makes a shocking announcement, that she is in a relationship with her mother's body double, Marjorie.
| 45 | 7 | "Congressional Ball" | Maurice Marable | Billy Kimball | June 5, 2016 | 1.10 |
Selina uses the White House Holiday Party to win over congressmen, as she finds out that Tom has his own agenda; Dan preps Jonah for an upcoming debate; the staff obsesses over an article naming the "50 Hottest D.C. Staffers".
| 46 | 8 | "Camp David" | Becky Martin | Rachel Axler | June 12, 2016 | 0.85 |
Selina conducts negotiations with the Chinese president on a Christmas retreat intended to be family-only; Jonah inadvertently attracts a large supporter as the New Hampshire election approaches.
| 47 | 9 | "Kissing Your Sister" | David Mandel | Erik Kenward | June 19, 2016 | 0.90 |
This episode is filmed in the style of and presented as a documentary, with Catherine providing the narration, direction and most cinematography (all of which is in character). The House votes on who will be president, but Jonah might not be there for it and the staff plans on firing Mike.
| 48 | 10 | "Inauguration" | Becky Martin | Jim Margolis | June 26, 2016 | 1.15 |
Tom James is set to be the new president. Selina asks for Secretary of State but is sidelined by Tom. In an unexpected turn of events, Vice President Andrew Doyle lobbies votes for Laura Montez in exchange for Secretary of State, and she becomes the new President of the United States. Selina, who brokered a legacy-making deal with the Chinese government for freeing Tibet, has it snapped up by Montez's team and declared as their first success in influencing foreign policy. Selina leaves, confused as to what to do next, and Jonah is diagnosed with testicular cancer.

== Production ==
Season five was the first overseen by David Mandel, who took over after then showrunner and series creator Armando Iannucci stepped down. Mandel made the decision to deliver Selina to an election loss because it would foster better comedic material. He and lead actress Julia Louis-Dreyfus worked together previously when Mandel was a Seinfeld writer.

The first episode premiered on HBO on April 24, 2016. Episodes were released weekly thereafter. Veep was renewed for a sixth season the day after the premiere.

== Reception ==
Season five of Veep received critical acclaim. It holds a 94% on review aggregator Rotten Tomatoes. Ben Travers rated the season an A in IndieWire and described it: "Well, so far Season 5 feels as though Iannucci built the ship and is letting Mandel take it out on the water. It’s running just fine, even if it may not get any exciting additions comparable to what’s come before." Allison Herman, top critic for The Ringer, noted that amid the change over to Mandel, "Veep’s edge has stayed razor-sharp...To borrow a stale political term, the show has doubled down on its strengths: Louis-Dreyfus's slowly crumbling rictus and the methodical puncturing of the illusion that 'government' and 'authority' are in any way related." Jen Chaney reviewed season 5 in the New York Times: "The election may be deadlocked, but already, Season 5 looks like a winner."

Caroline Framke of Vox praised Julia Louis-Dreyfus's performance in season five as "a terrifying, disgusting, completely beautiful thing to behold." Sarah Marshall of The Week wrote that the season effectively depicts the personalities drawn to politic: "Veep is a show about the pursuit of power, but it's also about the broken people who pursue it. In the process, it's become one of the most disturbingly insightful character-driven narratives of our day."

The season garnered nominations for the Primetime Emmy Awards, SAG Awards, TCA Awards, and the Writers Guild of America Awards. Among other wins, the series received a Primetime Emmy Award for Outstanding Comedy Series and Louis-Dreyfus won her fifth Primetime Emmy Award for Outstanding Lead Actress in a Comedy Series for the role.
