= Mother (Veep) =

- Veep episode
- Episode no.: Season 5 Episode 4
- Directed by: Dale Stern
- Written by: Alex Gregory; Peter Huyck
- Editing by: Shawn Paper
- Original air date: May 15, 2016
- Running time: 28 minutes

Guest appearances
- Dan Bakkedahl as Roger Furlong; Lauren Bowles as Monica; Clea DuVall as Marjorie Palmiotti; Nelson Franklin as Will; Hugh Laurie as Tom James; Martin Mull as Bob Bradley; Lennon Parham as Wendy Keegan; David Pasquesi as Andrew Meyer; John Slattery as Charlie Baird

Episode chronology
← Previous "The Eagle"	Next → "Thanksgiving"
- Veep season 5

"Mother" is the fourth episode of the fifth season of the American television comedy series Veep, and the 42nd episode overall. "Mother" aired on May 15, 2016, on HBO. It was written by Alex Gregory and Peter Huyck, and directed by Dale Stern.

At the 68th Primetime Emmy Awards, Julia Louis-Dreyfus won a Primetime Emmy Award for Outstanding Lead Actress in a Comedy Series for Selina Meyer's performance in "Mother".

== Synopsis ==
Selina Meyer (Julia Louis-Dreyfus) learns that her mother has suffered a severe stroke and is unlikely to recover. She travels to North Carolina with her daughter, Catherine (Sarah Sutherland), while the presidential recount in Nevada continues to dominate conversations among her staff; Amy Brookheimer (Anna Chlumsky), Dan Egan (Reid Scott), Ben Cafferty (Kevin Dunn), and Kent Davison (Gary Cole) remain focused on the election results as they coordinate with Selina from afar.

At the hospital, Selina reunites with her ex-husband Andrew (David Pasquesi), and visits her mother. Catherine is upset by Selina's detached attitude toward the situation, while Selina spends much of her time discussing the recount and taking calls from her staff. After doctors determine that her mother is brain-dead, the family decides to remove her life support.

Elsewhere, White House press secretary Mike McLintock (Matt Walsh) and his wife Wendy Keegan (Clea DuVall) continue looking into surrogacy options. Dan becomes increasingly frustrated with the uncertainty surrounding the election, and Amy struggles to manage the campaign's response as the recount drags on. Following her mother's death, Selina and her family attend the funeral. During the service, updates from Nevada continue to arrive, distracting both Selina and her staff. Selina delivers a eulogy, during which she learns that the recount has further benefited her opponent. She then discovers that her mother's will leaves the bulk of the estate to Catherine rather than to her.

== Critical reception ==
"Mother" received critical acclaim from reviewers. Both Den of Geek and Vulture gave the episode a 5 out of 5 rating, while Time magazine described "Mother" as "a transformative half-hour of TV". On a scale of A+ to F, The A.V. Club gave "Mother" an A rating, praising Louis-Dreyfus for "embracing Selina's narcissism and cruelty and presenting them without apology".

=== Accolades ===
For her performance in "Mother", Louis-Dreyfus won a Primetime Emmy Award for Outstanding Lead Actress in a Comedy Series at the 68th Primetime Emmy Awards in 2016. Also at the 68th Emmy Awards, the episode's director, Dale Stern, was nominated for Outstanding Directing for a Comedy Series, while the episode's writers, Alex Gregory and Peter Huyck, were nominees for Outstanding Writing for a Comedy Series.

The episode's editor, Shawn Paper, was nominated for a Primetime Emmy Award for Outstanding Picture Editing for a Single-Camera Comedy Series in 2016. In 2017, Stern was an Outstanding Directorial Achievement in Comedy Series nominee at the Directors Guild of America Awards for his work on the episode. The same year, Paper was nominated for Best Edited Half-Hour Series for Television at the American Cinema Editors Awards for "Mother".
