= Phil Reeves =

American actor (born 1953)

- Born: Philip Reeves; January 12, 1953 (age 73); New York City, New York, U.S.
- Education: Earlham College (BA); Dallas Theater Center (MFA)
- Occupations: Actor; screenwriter

Phil Reeves (born January 12, 1953) is an American film and television actor and screenwriter. He is known for the roles of Charles Swedelson on the sitcom Girlfriends, new Vice President Andrew Doyle in HBO's Veep, as Chairman of the Joint Chiefs of Staff General Krieger in Commander in Chief, and as Dr. Klieger in My Wife and Kids.

== Education ==
Reeves earned a Bachelor of Arts degree in philosophy and English from Earlham College and a Master of Fine Arts from the Dallas Theater Center, where he was mentored by playwright Mark Medoff.

== Career ==
He has written scripts for several movies, including Happy, Texas (1999). A second film, The Other Side, is under production.

Among his television appearances are episodes of LA Law, Nowhere Man, 3rd Rock from the Sun, JAG, NYPD Blue, Desperate Housewives, Medium, The Office, Girlfriends, Brockmire, Brooklyn Nine-Nine, and HBO's Veep.

Reeves has appeared in several feature films, including many by Alexander Payne. Credits include Central Intelligence, About Schmidt, Election, 13 Going on 30, Sideways, and Fun with Dick and Jane. Reeves had a regular guest role in the NBC comedy television series Parks and Recreation as Paul Iaresco, the city manager of the fictional town of Pawnee, Indiana. He appeared as Commissioner of the NYPD John Kelly in several episodes of season 5 and 6 of Brooklyn Nine-Nine.

Reeves plays "Coach T" in a series of Toyota commercials that aired 2012–15.

His play From The Journal Of Hazard McCauley was published by Broadway Play Publishing Inc. He spent years on stage in regional theater both in Los Angeles (at the Mark Taper Forum) and elsewhere. His Broadway Tour credit includes Children of a Lesser God.

== Filmography ==
=== Film ===
Year	Title	Role	Notes
1993	Calendar Girl	Officer	
1999	Election	Walt Hendricks	
2002	Pumpkin	Burt Wohlfert	
2002	About Schmidt	Minister in Denver	
2002	The Third Wheel	Bill Sykes	
2002	Moonlight Mile	Mr. Don Tippet	
2004	13 Going on 30	Wayne Rink	
2004	Sideways	Vacationing Dr. Walt Hendricks	
2005	Guess Who	Fred	
2005	Fun with Dick and Jane	Car Dealer	
2006	Statistics	Sam	
2006	Gridiron Gang	CIF Official	
2007	Blades of Glory	Father	
2007	Evan Almighty	Committee Member	
2009	Taking Chances	Stanton Revere	
2012	A Thousand Words	Don Parker	
2016	Central Intelligence	Principal Kent	
2017	Downsizing	Audrey's Dad Larry	
2020	Eat Wheaties!	Earl Straw	

=== Television ===
Year	Title	Role	Notes
1987, 1989	L.A. Law	Dr. Alan Patterson / Dr. Charles Bassett	2 episodes
1988	Goddess of Love	Clergyman	Television film
1989	Life Goes On	Dr. Singleton	Episode: "Break a Leg, Mom"
1989	21 Jump Street	Assistant Dean Pritchert	Episode: "Stand by Your Man"
1992	The Commish	Talbot	Episode: "The Witches of Eastbridge"
1993	Sisters	Sanford Culhane	Episode: "All That Glitters"
1993	Barbarians at the Gate	Wally McNab	Television film
1994	Ray Alexander: A Taste for Justice	Dr. Radcliffe	Television film
1994	Picket Fences	Bob Breech	Episode: "For Whom the Wind Blows"
1994	Witch Hunt	Sen. Trumble	Television film
1995	My Brother's Keeper	Peter	Television film
1995	Nowhere Man	Dr. Alan Haynes	Episode: "Turnabout"
1995	The Client	Barnett Cater	Episode: "The Burning of Atlanta"
1996	Voice from the Grave	Father Ryan	Television film
1996	Diagnosis: Murder	Judge Walter Graystone	Episode: "35 Millimeter Murder"
1997	Chicago Hope	Dr. Garter	Episode: "Growing Pains"
1999	Lansky	FBI Agent on Jetliner	Television film
1999	3rd Rock from the Sun	Dr. Mora	Episode: "Sex and the Sally"
2000	JAG	Congressman Wade Porter	Episode: "Flight Risk"
2001	The Invisible Man	Ambassador Hallewell	Episode: "Ghost of a Chance"
2001	Roswell	Judge	Episode: "Busted"
2001–2004	My Wife and Kids	Dr. Klieger / Doctor / Dr. Parks	6 episodes
2001–2007	Girlfriends	Charles Swedelson	19 episodes
2002	Rugrats	Audience Member	2 episodes
2002	First Monday	US Attorney Haladan	2 episodes
2002	The Guardian	Anesthesiologist	Episode: "Sacrifice"
2003	NYPD Blue	Dr. Kenneth Hale	Episode: "Meet the Grandparents"
2004	Six Feet Under	Stan	Episode: "The Black Forest"
2004	Medical Investigation	Sheriff	Episode: "Mutation"
2004	As Told by Ginger	Anesthesiologist Al	Episode: "The Wedding Frame"
2005	Desperate Housewives	Mickey Gibb	Episode: "Move On"
2005	The Bernie Mac Show	Mickey	Episode: "You Got Served"
2005	Medium	Fred	Episode: "When Push Comes to Shove: Part 1"
2006	Commander in Chief	General Krieger	3 episodes
2007	Head Case	Dr. Nichols	2 episodes
2008	The Office	Phil Maguire	Episode: "Job Fair"
2009–2011	Parks and Recreation	Paul Iaresco	7 episodes
2012	True Blood	General Cavanaugh	Episode: "Sunset"
2012	NTSF:SD:SUV::	Gabe Sampson	Episode: "Robot Town"
2012	The League	Judge Hobart	Episode: "Judge MacArthur"
2012–2019	Veep	Andrew Doyle	20 episodes
2013	Arrested Development	Colonel Smalls	Episode: "Off the Hook"
2015	Castle	Ronald Booth	Episode: "Cool Boys"
2016–2019	The Detour	Gene	12 episodes
2017	I'm Sorry	Optometrist	Episode: "Off The Charts"
2017	Ryan Hansen Solves Crimes on Television	Alfonso Diaphano	Episode: "Jane D'Oh!"
2018–2019	Brockmire	Art Newlie	3 episodes
2019	Brooklyn Nine-Nine	John Kelly	4 episodes
2019–2020	Black Monday	Henri Georgina	5 episodes
2020	Love, Victor	Wally	Episode: "What Happens in Willacoochee..."
2021	Home Economics	Marshall	4 episodes
2023	American Auto	Syd	Episode: "Cost Cutting"
