= Selina Meyer =

Fictional politician

- Veep character
- Julia Louis-Dreyfus as Selina Meyer in a DVD cover for season 1 of Veep
- First appearance: "Fundraiser" (April 22, 2012)
- Last appearance: "Veep" (May 12, 2019)
- Created by: Armando Iannucci
- Portrayed by: Julia Louis-Dreyfus

In-universe information
- Occupation: President of the United States (former); Vice President of the United States (former); United States senator from Maryland (former); Member of the U.S. House of Representatives from Maryland's 14th district (former)
- Family: Gordon Dunn Eaton (father, deceased); Catherine Calvert Eaton (mother, deceased); Richard Meyer-Palmiotti (grandson); Marjorie Palmiotti (daughter-in-law)
- Spouse: Andrew Meyer (ex-husband)
- Significant others: Ted Cullen (dated); Ray Whelans (fling); Charlie Baird Jr. (dated); Tom James (fling); Mohammed bin Nasser bin Khalifa Al Jaffar (dated)
- Children: Catherine Selina Meyer (daughter)
- Nationality: American
- Alma Mater: Smith College (BA); Yale Law School (JD)

Selina Catherine Meyer (/ˈmaɪ.ər/ MY-ər; née Eaton) is a fictional character portrayed by Julia Louis-Dreyfus on the HBO television comedy series Veep. Louis-Dreyfus has been critically acclaimed for the role, earning a record-breaking six consecutive Primetime Emmy Award for Outstanding Lead Actress in a Comedy Series awards and five Golden Globe Award for Best Actress – Television Series Musical or Comedy nominations.

Meyer was a United States senator from Maryland who becomes the vice president of the United States following an unsuccessful run for president. During the first season, she is a powerless vice president and disregarded by most other important officials, leading to various humiliations and indignities. During the second season, she begins to amass some power and influence. In the third season, she contemplates challenging the president for their unnamed party's nomination in light of his political weakness, but the issue becomes moot when he abruptly resigns and she becomes president. In the fourth season, she faces strong primary and general election challengers as she tries to win a presidential term in her own right. The election results in an Electoral College tie, setting the stage for the fifth season as the United States House of Representatives prepares to choose the president. She ultimately loses but spends the sixth and seventh seasons clawing her way back into the White House.

The role led to Louis-Dreyfus earning several milestone achievements; her fourteenth Primetime Emmy Award nomination for a role in the regular cast of a comedy series surpassed Lucille Ball as the most ever. Her Primetime Emmy Award for her third different regular cast role also was a record-setting achievement for a comedy actress. Her six consecutive Primetime Emmy Lead Actress awards set a record, as did her seven overall Primetime Emmy Lead Actress nominations.

Meyer regularly appears on lists of greatest television characters of the twenty-first century and of all time.

== Fictional biography ==
Meyer was born Selina Catherine Eaton to mother Catherine Calvert Eaton and Gordon Dunn Eaton in Palm Springs, Florida. In her childhood, she loved her father (whom she affectionately called Daddy), but resented her narcissistic mother. It is later revealed that Selina's father was an adulterer (who died from a heart attack while having sex with his secretary) and an unsuccessful businessman (who sold off Selina's beloved childhood horse Chicklet and had to be bailed out by his wife). Her father's secretary (childless due to their affairs and a series of coerced abortions) acted most like a parent towards Selina, giving her a childhood snow-globe collection as a surrogate child. Her 'Uncle' George, one of her father's business associates and a close friend of the Eaton family, may be Selina's biological father although it is implied that her mother had multiple affairs. Selina attended Smith College and Yale Law School. As a young woman, she married Andrew Meyer, a shady real estate developer, with whom she has a daughter, Catherine. She eventually divorces Andrew for repeatedly cheating on her and shows little (if any) maternal instinct towards her daughter.

The show's original opening sequence details some of her career. She was a United States senator from Maryland (where she was raised). Furthering her connection to the state of Maryland, the first season established Meyer as being a fan of the NFL's Baltimore Ravens; Meyer also hosted an event at Oriole Park at Camden Yards, the home field of MLB's Baltimore Orioles. She announced her candidacy for the 2012 presidential election. Media outlets initially praised her and had high hopes for her becoming the president, with headlines such as "Magic Meyer" and "Is this Meyer's Moment?". Despite strong initial victories, she ultimately is defeated by primary challenger Stuart Hughes on Super Tuesday, and suspends her campaign. He then selects her as his running mate and is elected to the presidency.

As the vice president, Meyer finds herself increasingly ignored by the president, and often demoted to trivial matters, or campaigns which she personally disliked such as combatting childhood obesity. Any and all programs that Meyer pursued which she genuinely believed in, such as the Clean Jobs Initiative or Senate filibuster reform, were often stymied at the president's insistence out of political expediency. Following the 2014 midterms, Meyer is given special responsibility for foreign affairs, entailing numerous overseas trips, as reward for her campaigning. When the sitting president decides that he will not seek a second term, his chief of staff, Ben Cafferty, encourages Meyer to run, which she ultimately does. She faces a primary challenge from war veteran and Governor of Minnesota Danny Chung, Secretary of Defense George Maddox, freshman Congressman Owen Pierce, and baseball coach Joe Thornhill. During the course of the primary season, President Hughes resigns abruptly to care for his ailing wife, and Meyer ascends to the presidency. Headlines question whether Meyer will be "the 8-month president", confirming that Hughes' term was near over, and Meyer is constitutionally eligible to serve two full terms as president. Though she chooses Senator Andrew Doyle to become her vice president, he declines to serve as her running mate for a full term as vice president. She offers the running mate position to Senator Tom James when she secures the party nomination, albeit after Danny Chung declines, George Maddox proves himself an inept candidate, and Meyer rules out the prospect of a female running mate. In the run-up to the 2016 election, Meyer attempted to enact a subsidized childcare program via the Families First Bill, also known as the "Mommy Meyer Bill" (much to her chagrin), funded by the scrapping of an obsolete nuclear defense system costing $50 billion. Due to Congressional opposition to potential job losses it would incur, an accidental pledge to increase spending on said system by $10 billion and public hostility to the program, the Meyer administration secretly lobbied to have the bill rejected in a House vote so that Meyer could win the upcoming election. However, a resultant Congressional inquiry found that not only did the Meyer administration secretly lobby against its own legislation, the Meyer campaign used confidential information obtained from a Medicaid leak in targeted campaign materials aimed at bereaved parents.

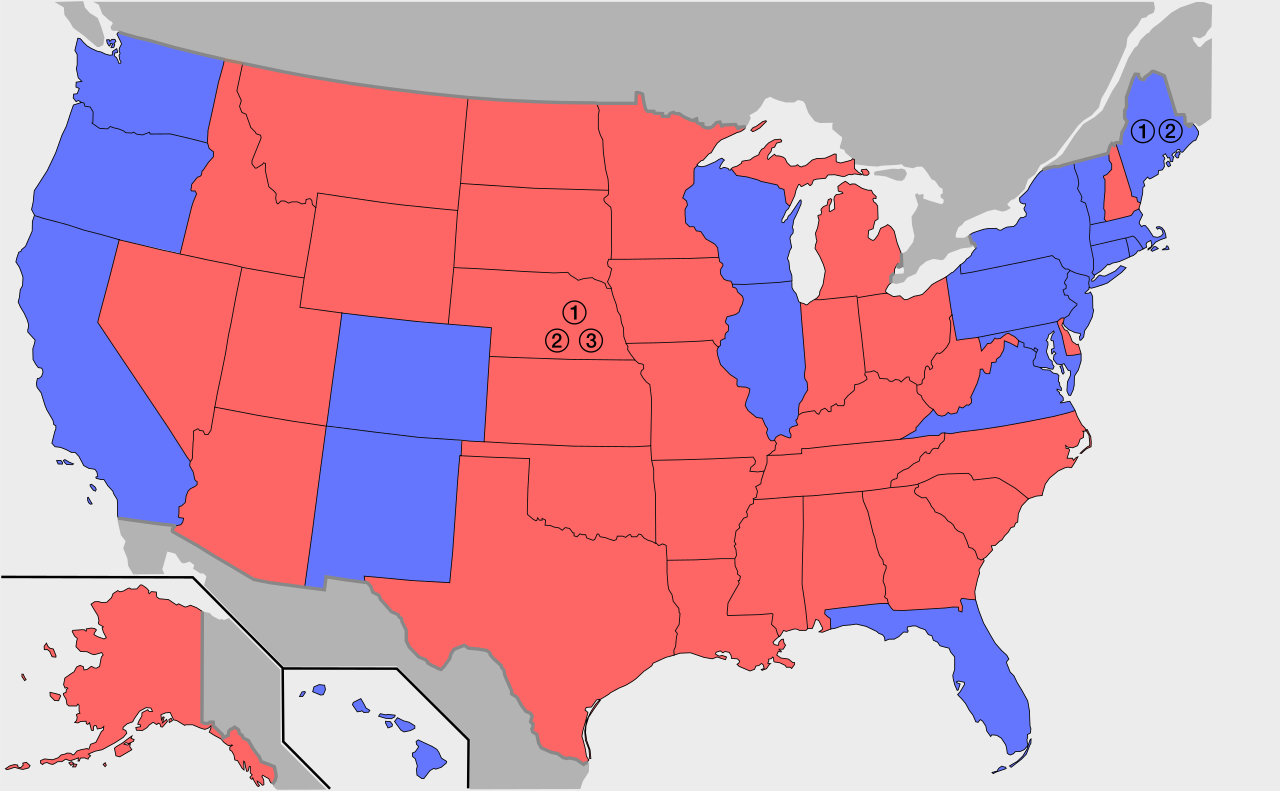
The Electoral College map of the in-universe 2016 election, which resulted in a 269-269 deadlock. Selina Meyer Bill O'Brien

Meyer is challenged in the general election by Arizona Senator Bill O'Brien. The election ends in an Electoral College tie, but with Meyer having won the popular vote. After an ambiguous result in Nevada, the Meyer campaign successfully lobbies for a recount. The recount backfires, with O'Brien not only keeping Nevada's electoral votes, but also overtaking Meyer's lead in the national popular vote due to previously uncounted military absentee votes. As Congress must then decide who will be the president, Meyer lobbies individual House Representatives for their votes, and even supports the campaign of White House staffer Jonah Ryan during a special congressional election in New Hampshire and promises to multiple people that she would appoint them as Secretary of State. After the House of Representatives fails to elect the president, Meyer agrees to be vice president for her running mate Tom James (having originally considered allowing O'Brien to win the House vote to allow her to run again at the next election). However, the Senate instead elects O'Brien's running mate Laura Montez as vice president, with Vice President Doyle as President of the Senate casting the deciding vote in favour of Montez to become Secretary of State after Meyer broke her promise to appoint him to the position. Due to the tied vote in the House and the House Speaker's refusal to hold another vote, the office of the president is left vacant, meaning that Vice President Montez immediately ascends to the presidency. As a result, James makes plans to return to the private sector while Meyer, now completely out of office, contemplates her future. It is mentioned throughout the final two seasons that she went to a psychiatric hospital that she referred to as a 'wellness spa' during the year after her loss in the House vote (although she later tells reporters that it was Catherine who went).

Throughout the sixth season, which is set in 2018, Selina Meyer begins her presidential memoir with the help of her ghostwriter and former Press Secretary Mike McLintock. She also enlists several of her former aides to help run her namesake charity funded by her daughter, The Meyer Fund for Adult Literacy, AIDS, the Advancement of Global Democracy, Military Family Assistance, & Childhood Obesity. As part of her work with democracy, she supervises Georgian elections in which both sides offer to bribe her. Meyer believes that President Montez will nominate her to be a justice on the Supreme Court; instead, former president Hughes is nominated. She also begins working on trying to secure a place for her library; although Smith College initially accepts, the college turns her down due to controversies resulting from the firing of her painter because she had sex with Andrew Meyer; Meyer briefly considered constructing it on the site of her mother's house, even demolishing it in preparation (despite the property legally belonging to Catherine); and Yale's offer immediately became controversial as the proposed site was previously used to house the college's slaves. McLintock loses his diary detailing the Meyer presidency, leading to The Washington Post releasing bombshell stories surrounding controversies in her administration; this is quickly overshadowed by the revelation that it was the Meyer team that had participated in talks regarding the freedom of Tibet. This wave of support leads Meyer to conclude that she has a political future, and she declares her run for president in 2019.

In 2019, she begins running a fierce campaign against Jonah Ryan, Tom James, and Nevada Governor Buddy Calhoun. In trying to attract large-scale fundraisers, she inadvertently influences Senator Kemi Talbot to run as well. She enlists much of her old team, with the notable addition of her campaign manager Keith Quinn, who has suspicious ties to the Chinese government. During the first primary debate, she creates the slogan "Man Up!" in response to Senator Talbot; also, it comes to light that her ex-husband Andrew committed several crimes, such as embezzlement, with funds from The Meyer Fund. Though Meyer loses Iowa, she wins New Hampshire; however in South Carolina she faces a demographic disadvantage. She enlists the help of the Chinese government with the help of Quinn, who uses voter suppression techniques in African-American neighbourhoods in the state, leading to her victory. Quinn also orders Andrew's murder; it is hinted at throughout the latter half of the season that Andrew survived. Meyer, on a trip to Norway to receive recognition from the Nobel Committee for her work in Tibet, receives an extradition warrant from the International Criminal Court for war crimes after it is revealed that as President she had ordered a drone strike on a wedding in Pakistan. She escapes with the help of Murman Shalikashvili, the dictatorial President of Georgia; she also has immense American support before the revelation that the drone strike killed an elephant.

During the series finale, she wins the brokered convention of her party in Charlotte, North Carolina by offering Ryan the vice presidency to get his delegates and (supposedly superficially) opposing same-sex marriage to get those of the socially conservative Calhoun; the latter causes a permanent rift between her and her lesbian daughter Catherine who is married to Marjorie, a former member of Selina’s Secret Service detail. She also frames Gary for impropriety with the Meyer Fund and ousts Tom James from the running after pressuring his campaign manager Michelle Yorke to reveal his sexual impropriety towards her. Meyer pursued these acts of compromise and chicanery to avoid having to appoint Talbot as her running mate (or to serve as Talbot's running mate herself). Ultimately, Meyer wins the nomination and the presidency. However the latter was the result of Chinese election interference in collusion with the Meyer campaign in exchange for the unchallenged re-annexation of Tibet; Montez would otherwise have been guaranteed re-election in spite of her own poor approval ratings, according to Chinese polling data (which was the original intention of the Chinese government).

Meyer's final, single presidential term is shaky and lonely; she has no friends during this time, and her presidency is politely described as “underrated”, remembered only for the brief liberation of Tibet and the permanent overturning of same-sex marriage. As vice president, Ryan is sidelined within the administration just as Meyer had been before him, eventually being impeached with Meyer probably encouraging it behind the scenes. She dies in 2045 aged between 75 and 77 (the uncertainty being due to her constantly lying about her age). Her funeral is attended most notably by U.S. President Richard J. Splett and First Lady Annette Splett as well as Meyer’s main adversaries, including former Presidents Laura Montez and Kemi Talbot, former Vice President Andrew Doyle, Tom James, the Dalai Lama, and possibly Andrew Meyer (all of whom she expressly did not want in attendance), and by her close associates, who remember the Meyer years as a turbulent time; the broadcast of the funeral service is watched by Jonah Ryan (who was not invited) and Catherine Meyer (whilst drinking celebratory margaritas). Coverage of her funeral is knocked out of the news cycle by the death of Tom Hanks the same day, a call back from season 1.

In a non-canonical Vulture article written by David Mandel, presented as an excerpt from the biography Size 2: The Year(s) of Selina Meyer by Robert A. Caro, Selina Meyer was depicted as the incumbent President during the outbreak of the coronavirus pandemic (during what would have been Montez's time in office). Meyer managed to competently co-ordinate response measures albeit by appointing Agriculture Secretary Richard Splett to the position of COVID-19 response coordinator, invoking the Defense Production Act to spite the President of Boeing, and being driven by her general aversion to the sick. Jonah Ryan's impeachment as Vice President was revealed to have resulted from personal bankruptcy after ill-judged investment in the airline industry.

== Character ==
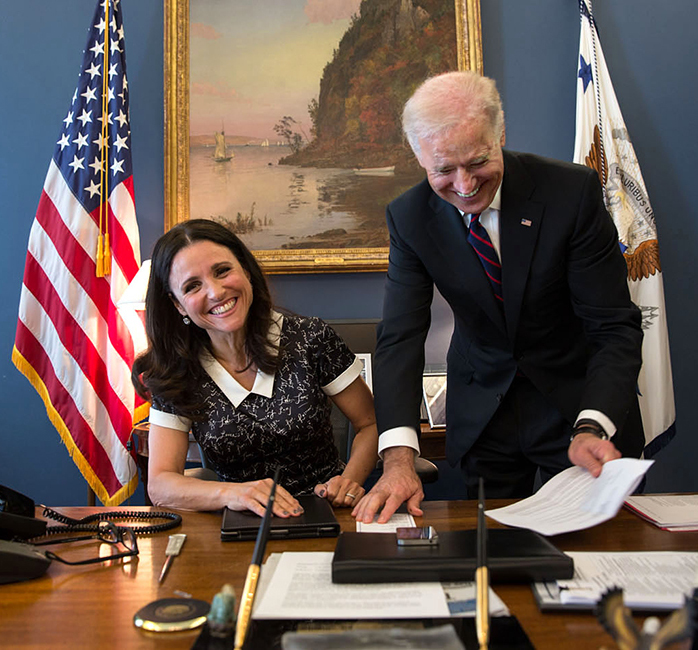
Julia Louis-Dreyfus, who plays fictional Vice President Selina Meyer, with Joe Biden, the real then-vice president of the United States, in 2013.

The show's premise is that Meyer is a former United States senator who runs a failed presidential campaign before being asked to be the winning candidate's vice president. As vice president, her world is kept in balance by her assistants: Amy Brookheimer (Anna Chlumsky) is the vice president's chief of staff, while Gary Walsh (Tony Hale) is Meyer's grovelling personal aide. Selina also hires Dan Egan (Reid Scott), who threatens Amy's place in the staff, and Mike McLintock (Matt Walsh), a press spokesman. Meyer has no significant other, and requires that her daughter Catherine, from a past marriage, make appointments to see her.

Some suggest that Meyer is likely a Republican, while others feel she is a Democrat. Alessandra Stanley of The New York Times notes that Meyer's party affiliation is unknown because the show focuses on bullying and ego rather than ideology. James Poniewozik of Time explains the ambiguity as follows: Veep is "almost all politics and almost no political issues". Robert Lloyd of Los Angeles Times explains the lack of need for party affiliations, or even political ideology in a similar manner, saying that Veep is "less a show about politics than about politicking." In an interview with The New Yorker Radio Hour, Julia Louis-Dreyfus suggested that Meyer's associated political party is intentionally left unknown to the audience. Louis-Dreyfus later elaborated: "[Selina Meyer's] politics are all about her and staying alive ... she will hold any position if it keeps her in office." In the episode "Election Night", CNN represents states won by Meyer as blue. In the same episode, she also remarks "a bowl of hair could win those states" regarding the 'blue wall' states of Connecticut and Vermont. However, in the finale of the season, she is seen as running for her party's nomination against Buddy Calhoun, whose political views, especially his opposition to same-sex marriage, appear to be more conservative in nature.

Poniewozik describes the season 1 Meyer as a "bumbling and overwhelmed" shadow of her former self. Merissa Marr of The Wall Street Journal describes Meyer as "inept". James Parker of The New York Times describes her as animated, powerless, prone to fits, and at times distracted. He notes that she motorcades and entourages with importance, but also passes time rotating dreamily in her swivel chair. Parker opines that Meyer "swears her head off" because that is what the modern "gaffe-phobic, linguistically constipated" public servant who has sold his/her soul to a lobbyist group does behind closed doors after public speeches about "ceaseless, toneless platitudes". Variety television critic Brian Lowry describes Meyer as "easily flustered, foul-mouthed", saying that her "over-reliance on profanity" is a comedic crutch. David Renshaw of The Guardian describes Meyer as "a perfect combination of ineptness and amorality".

T. A. Frank of The New Republic says that in season 1 she is completely ignored by the president and dismissed by Congress as she endures repeated indignities with a high degree of cynicism. According to Frank, Meyer slowly gains some respect and power, but it is not without effort. Entertainment Weekly's Ken Tucker, noted that the premise of a politician without influence striving for it suited itself well to a comedy and that her frequent cursing should not have been much of an issue given that it was an HBO production. Laura Bennett of The New Republic states that in season 1 Meyer is "a hapless buffoon, fluffing her hair and running in circles", who endures marginalization and irrelevance, but in season 2, which is set during midterm elections, she is "a player in the administration with concrete involvement in foreign policy".

== Reception ==
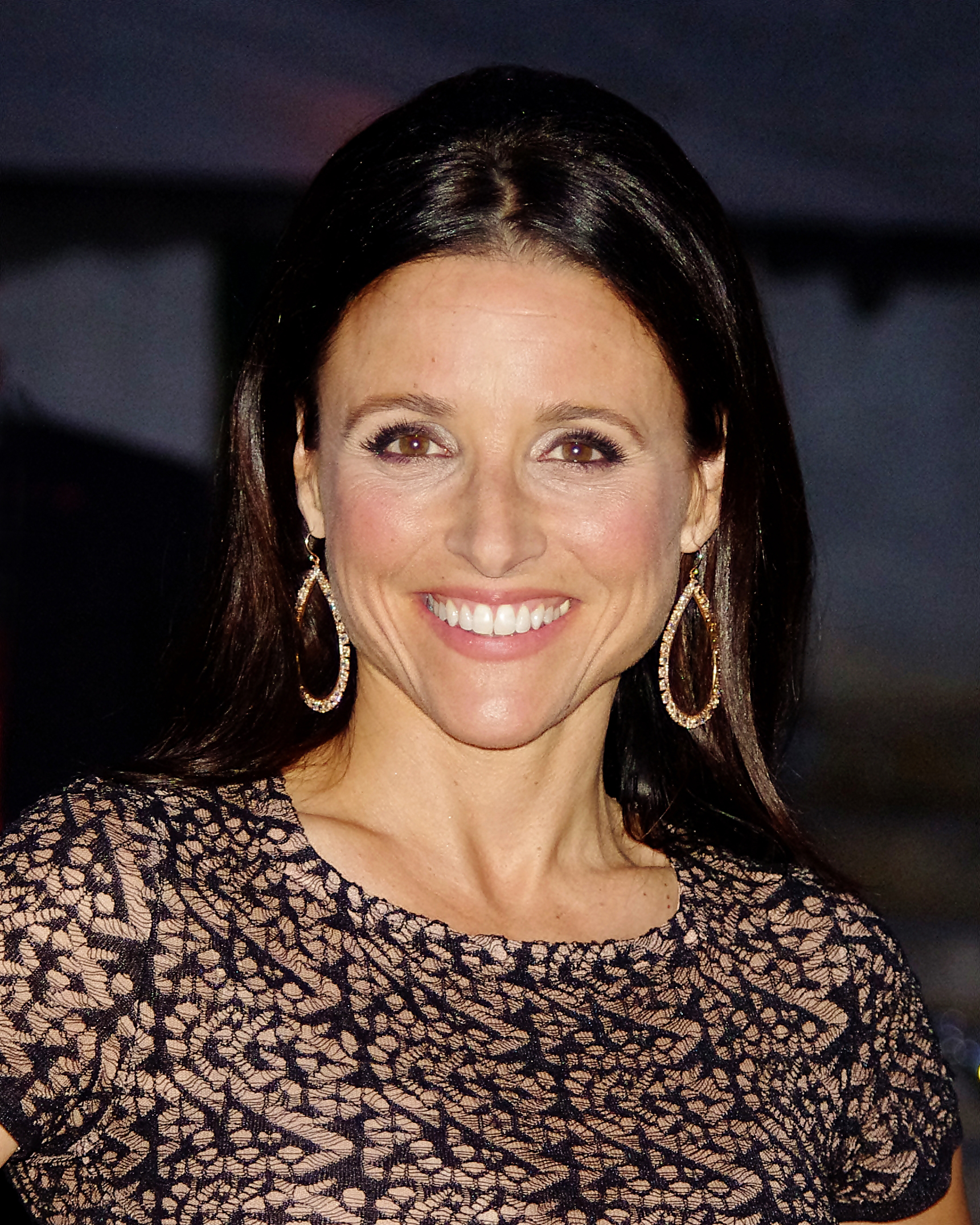
Louis-Dreyfus in 2012

The role has established Louis-Dreyfus as the all-time most Primetime Emmy Award decorated actress in terms of regular cast roles in a comedy series (i.e., not counting guest acting Emmys). It is the third character (after Elaine Benes on Seinfeld and Christine Campbell on The New Adventures of Old Christine) for which Louis-Dreyfus has earned a Primetime Emmy Award (Outstanding Lead Actress or Outstanding Supporting Actress in a Comedy Series). When Louis-Dreyfus earned the second Emmy nomination for this role it marked her fourteenth Primetime Emmy nomination for either Outstanding Lead Actress or Outstanding Supporting Actress in a Comedy Series, surpassing Lucille Ball's all-time record. The win tied her with Ball with a total of four and made her the first actress to win Primetime Emmy Awards for three different regular cast comedy roles. Her second win also made her the first actress to become a two-time awardee as a comedy actress for HBO.

She earned Primetime Emmy Awards for her season 1 and season 2 performances in 2012 and 2013 at the 64th Primetime Emmy Awards and 65th Primetime Emmy Awards ceremonies. She was nominated at the 70th Golden Globe Awards and 71st Golden Globe Awards for her season 1 and season 2 performances. Her season 2 performance also earned a Screen Actors Guild Award for Outstanding Performance by a Female Actor in a Comedy Series award at the 20th Screen Actors Guild Awards. Louis-Dreyfus has earned a wide range of additional nominations and awards for this role including nominations for Screen Actors Guild Award for Outstanding Performance by an Ensemble in a Comedy Series, Critics' Choice Television Award for Best Actress in a Comedy Series, TCA Award for Individual Achievement in Comedy, Satellite Award for Best Actress – Television Series Musical or Comedy, and Women's Image Network Award for Best Actress in a Comedy Series.

In season 3, Meyer continued to be a critically acclaimed role. Louis-Dreyfus earned a Critics' Choice Television Award for Best Actress in a Comedy Series nomination at the 4th Critics' Choice Television Awards. At the 30th TCA Awards, Dreyfus won TCA Award for Individual Achievement in Comedy. Louis-Dreyfus again won the Primetime Emmy Award for Outstanding Lead Actress in a Comedy Series at the 66th Primetime Emmy Awards. She was also nominated again for the Female Actor in a Comedy Series and Outstanding Performance by an Ensemble in a Comedy Series at the 21st Screen Actors Guild Awards as well as Actress – Television Series Musical or Comedy at the 72nd Golden Globe Awards.

The season 4 portrayal of Meyer continued to earn praise. At the 67th Primetime Emmy Awards Louis-Dreyfus won the Primetime Emmy Award for Outstanding Lead Actress in a Comedy Series for a fourth consecutive time. She was also nominated again for the Female Actor in a Comedy Series and Outstanding Performance by an Ensemble in a Comedy Series at the 22nd Screen Actors Guild Awards as well as Best Actress – Television Series Comedy at the 73rd Golden Globe Awards. She also received acting nominations at the 5th Critics' Choice Television Awards, 20th Satellite Awards, and 31st TCA Awards. In earning her fourth consecutive and fifth overall Lead Actress Emmy, Louis-Dreyfus tied Mary Tyler Moore and Candice Bergen with five wins in the category and tied Helen Hunt for four consecutive wins in the category.

The season 5 performance earned a nomination for Primetime Emmy Award for Outstanding Lead Actress in a Comedy Series at the 68th Primetime Emmy Awards, which she ultimately won and dedicated to her recently deceased father. The win gave her the record of five consecutive wins in the category, surpassing Hunt as well as six total wins in the category surpassing Bergen and Moore. She received acting nominations at the 32nd TCA Awards. and 7th Critics' Choice Television Awards. She also wins again for the Female Actor in a Comedy Series and nominated for Outstanding Performance by an Ensemble in a Comedy Series at the 23rd Screen Actors Guild Awards as well as Best Actress – Television Series Comedy at the 74th Golden Globe Awards.

Louis-Dreyfus' performance as Meyer in season 6 again won the Primetime Emmy Award for Outstanding Lead Actress in a Comedy Series at the 69th Primetime Emmy Awards, extending her records set the prior year. Julia Louis-Dreyfus received a seventh Primetime Emmy Award nomination for her performance as Meyer for the seventh and final season, extending her record for most nominations in the category; the award was won by Phoebe Waller-Bridge for Fleabag, marking Louis-Dreyfus's first loss in the category for Veep.
