= Sufe Bradshaw =

American actress

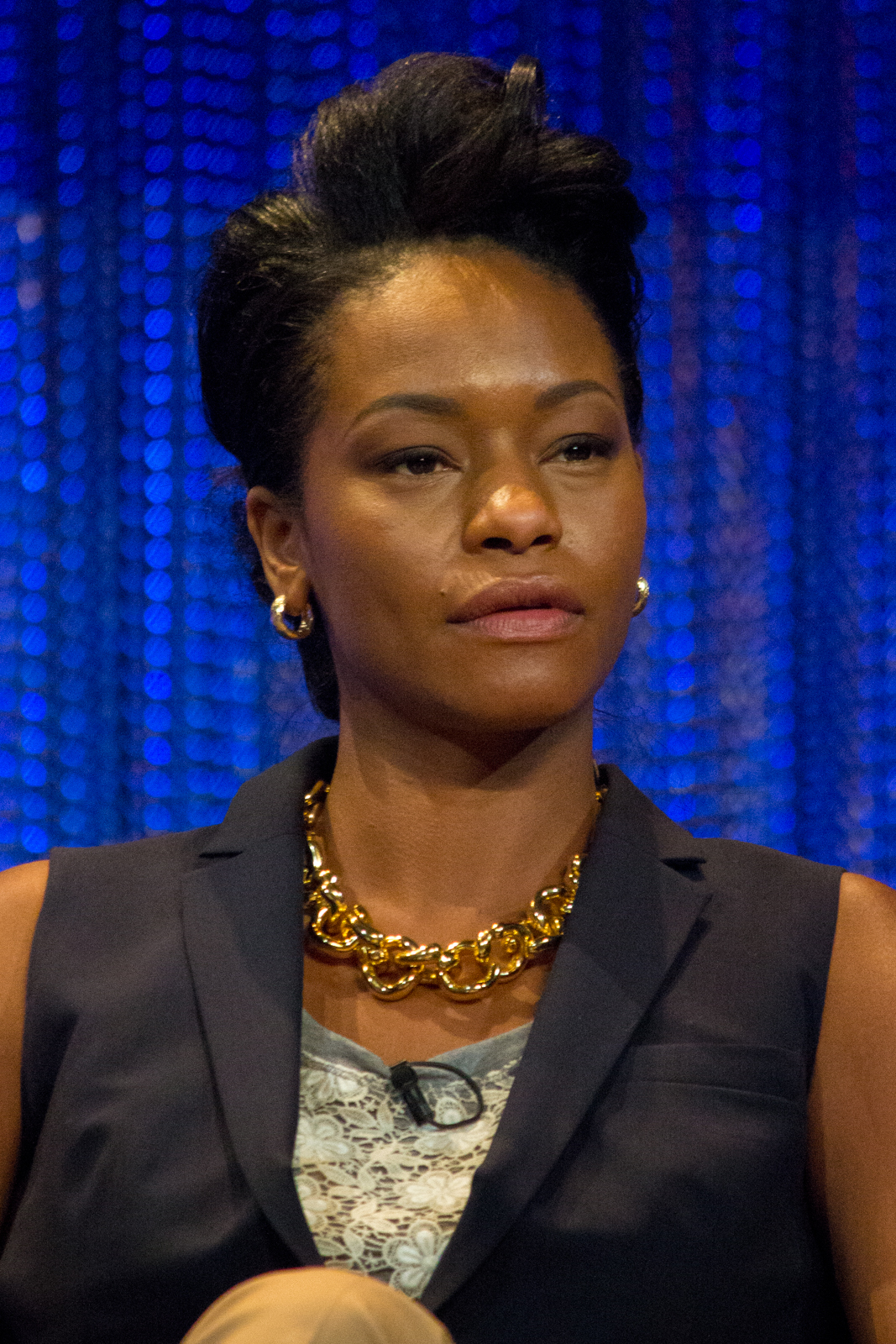
- Bradshaw at the New York PaleyFest 2014 for the TV show Veep
- Born: November 30, 1979 (age 46); Chicago, Illinois, U.S.
- Occupation: Actress
- Years active: 2005–present

Sufe Bradshaw (/ˈsuːfi/ SOO-fee; born November 30, 1979) is an American actress, best known for her role as Sue, the secretary and scheduler to Vice President Selina Meyer, in the HBO comedy series Veep. Her prior acting credits include guest roles in Prison Break, Mind of Mencia, Southland, Cold Case and FlashForward, as well as a minor role in the 2009 feature film Star Trek.

== Early life ==
Sufe Bradshaw was born on November 30, 1979 on the West Side of Chicago, Illinois, where she was raised. She has nine siblings.

== Career ==
Bradshaw has also worked as a documentary filmmaker. Her project New Leaves, currently in development, examines children growing up in impoverished or underprivileged urban neighborhoods. She has also performed as a spoken word poet, and does humanitarian and activist work for groups including One Billion Rising and the Greenway Art Alliance.

Bradshaw played Sue Wilson, the secretary to the Vice President in the HBO comedy series Veep for the show's first five seasons. She did not appear in the show's sixth season as a result of developing a glucose issue. She appeared in the final episode of the seventh and final season, returning as Meyer's secretary in the White House after the character is elected.

== Filmography ==
=== Film ===
| Year | Title | Role | Notes |
|---|---|---|---|
| 2005 | The Les Brown Show | Make-up Artiste | Short |
| 2006 | Speechless | May | |
| 2007 | Black Woman's Guide to Finding a Good Man | Mika Moore | Video |
| 2007 | Mr. Jackson's Neighborhood | Kim | Short |
| 2009 | The Lost Nomads: Get Lost! | April | |
| 2009 | Star Trek | Cadet Alien | |
| 2009 | Dance Flick | Keloid | |
| 2010 | Infatuation of a Psychopath | - | Short |
| 2010 | Halfway Where? | Agent #2 | Short |
| 2011 | Susan's Remembrance | Forensic Specialist Smith | Short |
| 2011 | Fixing Pete | Janice Taylor | TV movie |
| 2012 | Overnight | Shawna | |
| 2012 | And When He Died, All He Left Us Was Alone | - | Short |
| 2012 | Coming Home | Tiffany | Short |
| 2014 | Imperial Dreams | Detective Gill | |
| 2014 | Crossroads | YoYo | |
| 2014 | Snackpocalypse | School Nurse | Short |
| 2014 | Happy Medium | Dr. Diane Tyler | Short |
| 2015 | Marathon Day | - | Short |
| 2016 | Federal | Detective Mogues | Short |
| 2017 | Bad Kids of Crestview Academy | Dr. Knight | |
| 2019 | Murder Mystery | Holly | |
| 2020 | First One In | Ashalee | |
| 2021 | Together Together | Jean | |
| 2021 | The Disappearance of Mrs. Wu | Jill Crane | |
| 2021 | Val | Officer Daughtry | |
| 2022 | Metal Lords | Dean Swanson | |
| 2022 | Gasoline Alley (2022 film) | Eleanor Rogers | |
| 2023 | Little Dixie | Carla | |
| 2023 | The Getback | Detective Jade Hatch | |
| 2023 | Guardian Angel | Wilma Reed | Short |
| 2023 | No Right Way | Amy | |
| 2023 | Rise | Fati | |

=== Television ===
| Year | Title | Role | Notes |
|---|---|---|---|
| 2006 | Yo Momma | Guest Comedian | Episode: "Episode #3.9" |
| 2008 | Cold Case | Chantelle Legros | Episode: "Ghost of My Child" |
| 2008 | Mind of Mencia | Shakey | Episode: "Episode #4.2" |
| 2009 | Trust Me | Receptionist | Episode: "Au Courant" |
| 2009 | ER | Waitress | Episode: "And in the End..." |
| 2009 | Southland | Josie | Episode: "Derailed" |
| 2009 | Prison Break | Wife | Episode: "Free" & "The Old Ball and Chain" |
| 2009 | FlashForward | Ms. Gerber | Episode: "White to Play" |
| 2009 | Bones | Gina McNamara | Episode: "The Tough Man in the Tender Chicken" |
| 2010 | The Hard Times of RJ Berger | Nurse | Episode: "It's All About the Hamiltons" |
| 2012–19 | Veep | Sue Wilson | Main Cast: Season 1–5, Guest: Season 7 |
| 2014 | Rizzoli & Isles | Dalia Reilly | Episode: "Food for Thought" |
| 2018 | The Guest Book | Angel | Episode: "Under Cover" |
| 2020 | Lovecraft Country | Nawi | Episode: "I Am." |
| 2021–22 | Hidden Canyons | Denise Collins | Main Cast |

== Awards and nominations ==
| Year | Association | Category | Nominated work | Result |
|---|---|---|---|---|
| 2013 | Screen Actors Guild Awards | Outstanding Performance by an Ensemble in a Comedy Series | Veep | Nominated |
| 2014 | Screen Actors Guild Awards | Outstanding Performance by an Ensemble in a Comedy Series | Veep | Nominated |
| 2015 | Screen Actors Guild Awards | Outstanding Performance by an Ensemble in a Comedy Series | Veep | Nominated |
| 2016 | Screen Actors Guild Awards | Outstanding Performance by an Ensemble in a Comedy Series | Veep | Nominated |
