= Timothy Simons =

American actor (born 1978)

Tim Simons
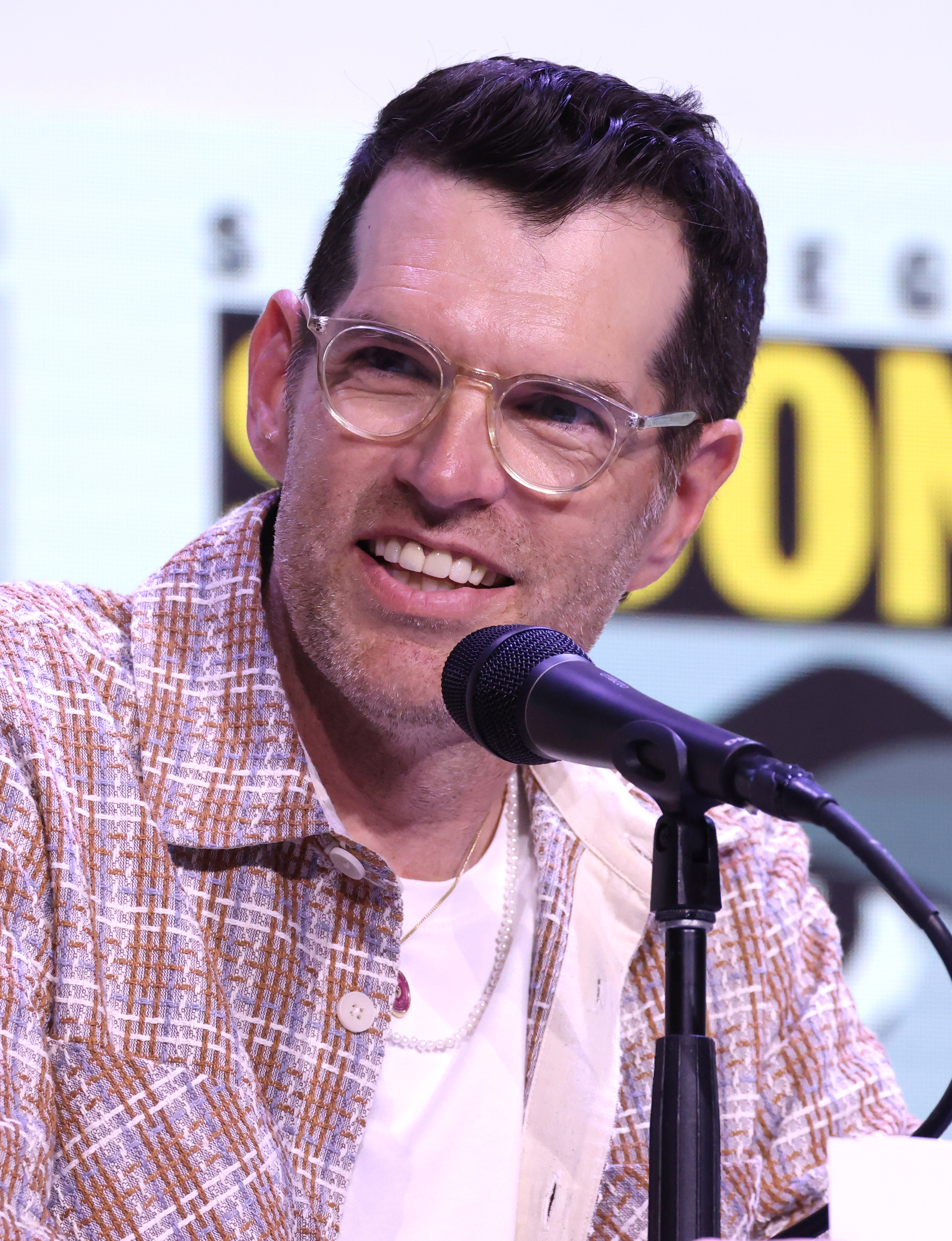
- Simons in 2025
- Born: June 12, 1978 (age 48)
- Education: University of Maine
- Occupation: Actor
- Years active: 2010–present
- Spouse: Annie Simons (m. 2008)
- Children: 2

Timothy Simons (born June 12, 1978) is an American actor. He is best known for his roles as Jonah Ryan on the HBO television series Veep (2012–2019) and as Sasha on the Netflix series Nobody Wants This (2024–present).

== Early life and education ==
Simons is the son of Susan and Ron Simons. He graduated from Maranacook Community High School in Readfield, Maine, in 1996 and the University of Maine in 2001.

== Career ==
Early in his career, he worked on commercials. He was behind the camera during auditions and callbacks for a 2009 Folgers commercial that later went viral.

From 2012 to 2019, Simons played Jonah Ryan on the HBO series Veep, for which he received five nominations and one win for the Screen Actors Guild Award for Outstanding Performance by an Ensemble in a Comedy Series. He also appeared on the series Candy (2022) as Pat Montgomery and is a series regular on Nobody Wants This (2024–present). He has also had acting roles in the films The Interview (2014), Christine (2016), and The Boss (2016).

In 2024, Simons was cast for the second season of Percy Jackson and the Olympians as King Tantalus.

He was the undergraduate commencement speaker for the University of Maine in 2026.

== Personal life ==
Simons and his wife, Annie, have two children. He is also known by the moniker "Hitmaker" and is an avid physical media collector.

== Filmography ==
=== Film ===
Year	Title	Role	Notes
2010	Days Together	Bartender at R Bar	
2013	Beneath the Harvest Sky	Dayton	
2014	Draft Day	Marx	
2014	Inherent Vice	Agent Borderline	
2014	The Interview	Malcolm	
2015	Digging for Fire	Yoga Couple	
2015	Goosebumps	Officer Stevens	
2016	Christine	Steve Turner	
2016	The Boss	Stephan	
2016	Flock of Dudes	Butler	
2016	Gold	Jeff Jackson	
2018	Irreplaceable You	Dominic	
2018	Ralph Breaks the Internet	Butcher Boy (voice)	
2019	Extracurricular Activities	Cliff Dawkins	
2019	Yes, God, Yes	Father Murphy	
2019	The Hustle	Jeremy	
2020	Happiest Season	Mall Security Ed	
2021	Home Sweet Home Alone	Hunter	
2022	Family Squares	Bret Worth	Also P & Y Camera Operator
2022	Don't Worry Darling	Dr. Collins	
2023	Shortcomings	Leon	
2023	Joy Ride	Frank	
2023	Candy Cane Lane	Emerson	
2025	Easy's Waltz		
2025	The Twits	Marty Muggle-Wump (voice)	
2025	Percy Jackson and the Olympians	Tantalus	
2026	Scream 7	George Willis	

=== Television ===
Year	Title	Role	Notes
2012–19	Veep	Jonah Ryan	Main role; 65 episodes Screen Actors Guild Award for Outstanding Performance by an Ensemble in a Comedy Series (2017); Nominated – Screen Actors Guild Award for Outstanding Performance by an Ensemble in a Comedy Series (2013–16)
2012	Best Friends Forever	Tall Guy	Episode: "Single and Lovin' It"
2015	Stone Quackers	Various voices	2 episodes
2017	Easy	Whitman	Episode: "Package Thief"
2017	Drop the Mic	Himself	Episode: "Tony Hale vs. Timothy Simons / Rascal Flatts vs. Boyz II Men"
2018–19	Rise of the Teenage Mutant Ninja Turtles	Huginn (voice)	9 episodes
2019	Future Man	Xenu	Episode: "Countdown to Prologue"
2019	Looking for Alaska	The Eagle	Main role; 8 episodes
2019	Robot Chicken	Porter (voice)	Episode: "Robot Chicken's Santa's Dead (Spoiler Alert) Holiday Murder Thing Special"
2020	Big Hero 6: The Series	Supersonic Stu (voice)	3 episodes
2020	Briarpatch	Candy Bar Bains	Episode: "Game Theory and Mescaline"
2020	Bob's Burgers	TSA Agent (voice)	Episode: "The Terminalator II: Terminals of Endearment"
2020	The George Lucas Talk Show	Himself	Episode: "Radioland Stream Night"
2021	Dickinson	Frederick Law Olmsted	Episode: "The Daisy follows soft the Sun"
2021	Ten Year Old Tom	Photographer (voice)	Episode: "A Yearbook to Disremember/Trust Me, I'm a Nurse"
2021	Inside Job	Flat Earth Leader (voice)	Episode: "My Big Flat Earth Wedding"
2021–22	Fairfax	Brian / various voices	7 episodes
2021–22	Station Eleven	Jim	2 episodes
2021–23	HouseBroken	Raccoon / various (voice)	21 episodes
2021–26	Rugrats	Drew Pickles (voice)	17 episodes
2022	Candy	Pat Montgomery	Main role
2023	History of the World, Part II	President Abraham Lincoln	Episode: "I"
2023	Celebrity Jeopardy!	Himself	Contestant
2023	Killing It	Agent Burton	2 episodes
2024–25	Sausage Party: Foodtopia	Various voices	6 episodes
2024–present	Nobody Wants This	Sasha Roklov	Main role Nominated – Critics' Choice Award for Best Supporting Actor in a Comedy Series (2025); Nominated – Gotham TV Award for Outstanding Supporting Performance in a Comedy Series (2025)
2025	Common Side Effects	Various voices	3 episodes
2025	The Handmaid's Tale	Commander Bell	5 episodes
2025	Percy Jackson and the Olympians	King Tantalus	4 episodes
2026	Celebrity Wheel of Fortune	Himself	Contestant
2026	Celebrity Jeopardy!	Himself	Contestant
2026	President Curtis	Dr. Keel (voice)	Episode: "Hollow"

=== Video games ===
Year	Title	Role	Notes
2025	Goodnight Universe	Elliot	
