= Mole map =

Mole map may refer to:

- Mole map (chemistry), a graphical representation of an algorithm
- Mole map (dermatology), a medical record which records and image and the location of lesions and/or moles

== See also ==
- "Mole-Mapping", an episode of Peep Show
