= Special Relationship (disambiguation) =

The Special Relationship is an unofficial term for relations between the United Kingdom and the United States.

Special Relationship also may refer to:

- The Special Relationship (film), a 2010 British-American political film
- A Special Relationship, novel by Douglas Kennedy
- The Special Relationship, British literary events series led by Jarred McGinnis
- The Special Relationship (Big Love), an episode of the American TV series Big Love
- "The Special Relationship" (The Green Green Grass), a 2007 television episode
- "Special Relationship" (Veep), a 2014 television episode
- "Special Relationship" (Waking the Dead), a 2002 television episode
- Anokha Rishta (lit. 'Special Relationship'), a 1986 Indian Hindi-language film by I. V. Sasi

== See also ==
- United Kingdom–United States relations
- Israel–United States relations
