= Special Relationship (Veep) =

- Veep episode
- Episode no.: Season 3 Episode 7
- Directed by: Becky Martin
- Story by: Simon Blackwell; Armando Iannucci; Tony Roche
- Teleplay by: Simon Blackwell; Tony Roche
- Editing by: Anthony Boys
- Original air date: May 18, 2014
- Running time: 31 minutes

Guest appearances
- Darren Boyd as Peter Mitchell; Justin Edwards as Rob; Rebecca Gethings as event guest; Christopher Meloni as Ray Whelans

Episode chronology
← Previous "Detroit"	Next → "Debate"
- Veep season 3

"Special Relationship" is the seventh episode of the third season of the American television comedy series Veep, and the 25th episode overall. "Special Relationship" aired on May 18, 2014, on HBO. It was written by Simon Blackwell, Armando Iannucci, and Tony Roche, and directed by Becky Martin. The episode, which features cast members from the British political sitcom The Thick of It, is named after a term used to describe United Kingdom–United States relations.

The editor of "Special Relationship", Anthony Boys, won an American Cinema Editors Award for Best Edited Half-Hour Series for Television for his work on the episode. Blackwell, Iannucci, and Roche were nominated for a Primetime Emmy Award for Outstanding Writing for a Comedy Series for "Special Relationship" in 2014. With 1.092 million American viewers, "Special Relationship" was the most-watched episode in the third season of Veep.

== Synopsis ==
Vice President Selina Meyer (Julia Louis-Dreyfus) travels to London with her staff to attend events marking the centenary of World War I, while continuing preparations for her presidential campaign. During the visit, Selina's attempts to improve the relationship between the United Kingdom and the United States are complicated by British deputy prime minister Peter Mitchell (Darren Boyd), whose awkward interactions with Selina attract unwanted media attention.

Campaign manager Dan Egan (Reid Scott) increasingly relies on the advice of personal trainer Ray Whelans (Christopher Meloni), despite concerns from Amy Brookheimer (Anna Chlumsky), Kent Davison (Gary Cole), and Ben Cafferty (Kevin Dunn) about Ray's influence. Amy secretly works with Jonah Ryan (Timothy Simons) to expose controversial comments from Ray's past, leading to a public scandal that overshadows Selina's diplomatic visit.

As the fallout grows, Dan struggles to contain the crisis and suffers a panic attack. Kent and Ben move to limit the damage to the campaign, while Selina becomes increasingly frustrated with Dan's performance. After the scandal dominates a press conference intended to focus on the war commemoration, Selina cuts short the trip and returns to the United States. Concluding that Dan has become a liability, she fires him as campaign manager and appoints Amy as his replacement.

== Critical reception ==
On a scale of A+ to F, "Special Relationship" was given an A− by The A.V. Club. Vulture rated the episode a 4/5, while Den of Geek gave a rating of a 5/5, with reviewer Tony Sokol calling it "one of the best Veep episodes in a series of great episodes.

=== Accolades ===
Anthony Boys, the editor of "Special Relationship", won an American Cinema Editors Award for Best Edited Half-Hour Series for Television for the episode.
