= List of Veep episodes =

Veep is an American political satire television comedy series created by Armando Iannucci, as a U.S. spin of the premise of his 2005 BBC series, The Thick of It. The series premiered on HBO on April 22, 2012. Shot in a cinéma-vérité style, Veep stars Julia Louis-Dreyfus as Selina Meyer, the Vice President of the United States (or "Veep"), and later President of the United States, as she struggles to stay politically relevant. During the course of the series, 65 episodes of Veep aired over seven seasons, between April 22, 2012, and May 12, 2019.

== Series overview ==
Season	Episodes	Originally released	
Season	Episodes	First released	Last released
1	8	April 22, 2012	June 10, 2012
2	10	April 14, 2013	June 23, 2013
3	10	April 6, 2014	June 8, 2014
4	10	April 12, 2015	June 14, 2015
5	10	April 24, 2016	June 26, 2016
6	10	April 16, 2017	June 25, 2017
7	7	March 31, 2019	May 12, 2019

== Episodes ==
=== Season 1 (2012) ===
No. overall	No. in season	Title	Directed by	Written by	Original release date	U.S. viewers (millions)
1	1	"Fundraiser"	Armando Iannucci	Story by : Armando Iannucci; Teleplay by : Armando Iannucci & Simon Blackwell	April 22, 2012	1.38
Vice President Selina Meyer wants to make the implementation of a Clean Jobs Commission her main legacy, but problems occur when a tweet from a staffer annoys the plastics industry; Selina makes an offensive joke at a fundraiser, and her Chief of Staff forgetfully signs her own name on a condolence card for the wife of a senator who just died. Dan becomes a member of Meyer's team.
2	2	"Frozen Yoghurt"	Armando Iannucci	Story by : Simon Blackwell; Teleplay by : Simon Blackwell & Armando Iannucci	April 29, 2012	1.15
A health scare temporarily allows VP Meyer to be commander-in-chief but delays her plan for a media meet-and-greet at the local yogurt store, showcasing a flavor named after her. She arrives to find only melting vanilla, stray bloggers, and some angry store owners. Also, a stomach bug goes around Capitol Hill.
3	3	"Catherine"	Tristram Shapeero	Story by : Sean Gray & Armando Iannucci & Tony Roche; Teleplay by : Sean Gray & Tony Roche	May 6, 2012	0.95
The VP and her team discover that her appointee for the Clean Jobs Commission is unacceptable. Selina celebrates 20 years in Washington, D.C., but tries to keep a low profile after a newspaper article paints her as a diva and rumors float about her feud with the First Lady. Meanwhile, Selina's college-age daughter arrives for a visit, and is surprised that her mother is looking for a dog but appalled by her reaction to "Selina" being on the list of names for hurricanes.
4	4	"Chung"	Armando Iannucci	Story by : Sean Gray & Armando Iannucci & Will Smith; Teleplay by : Sean Gray & Will Smith	May 13, 2012	0.94
Following an interview on Meet the Press, a slip of the tongue by Selina is misconstrued as a racist dig at one of her political rivals. The VP and her team go into recovery mode, trying to take the spotlight off Selina by visiting the sick and injured at a local hospital. Gary and Amy make a startling discovery about Selina's romantic life.
5	5	"Nicknames"	Tristram Shapeero	Simon Blackwell & Armando Iannucci	May 20, 2012	0.81
Bloggers' nicknames for Selina become her next obsession; Dan goes on a fact-finding mission after his boss is snubbed by the president which includes spending time with Jonah; it's make-or-break time for the Clean Jobs bill.
6	6	"Baseball"	Armando Iannucci	Story by : Simon Blackwell & Armando Iannucci & Tony Roche; Teleplay by : Simon Blackwell & Tony Roche	May 27, 2012	0.83
Selina hosts a conference to promote healthy eating at Baltimore's Camden Yards baseball park, but her pitch is balked at by some foul-tempered fast-food executives. Selina also confides a secret to Amy concerning Ted. Meanwhile, Mike holds a press briefing for local reporters, and Amy and Dan do their best to entertain students at an elementary school before the vice president arrives. Selina discovers she is pregnant.
7	7	"Full Disclosure"	Christopher Morris	Story by : Roger Drew & Armando Iannucci & Ian Martin; Teleplay by : Roger Drew & Ian Martin	June 3, 2012	1.18
With the Veep and her staff taking flack over a pregnancy rumor and the firing of the smiling Secret Service Agent, Selina, who had a miscarriage, orders a 'partial' full disclosure release of all office correspondence. Later, Selina dispatches Dan to make sure the Macauley Amendment (i.e. the toxic Clean Jobs bill) cannot be traced back to her. And with the perception growing that her office is increasingly non-functioning, Selina threatens to fire a key staffer. Also Ted and Selina break up via Gary.
8	8	"Tears"	Armando Iannucci	Story by : Jesse Armstrong & Armando Iannucci; Teleplay by : Jesse Armstrong	June 10, 2012	1.08
Selina visits Ohio to officially endorse a candidate for governor, but he doesn't want the low-rated vice president's support. Dan may have to go to a congressional hearing about the Clean Jobs bill. Mike and Amy decide to make use of Selina's emotional state.

=== Season 2 (2013) ===
No. overall	No. in season	Title	Directed by	Written by	Original release date	U.S. viewers (millions)
9	1	"Midterms"	Christopher Morris	Story by : Armando Iannucci & Will Smith; Teleplay by : Will Smith	April 14, 2013	1.19
Selina's party does poorly in the midterm election, though Selina has a successful campaign, which she attempts to leverage into greater influence for herself. A presidential strategist named Kent Davison (Gary Cole), with whom Selina has a troubled history, returns from an absence. Selina is assigned responsibility for foreign relations. Meanwhile, there are new developments in the staff's personal lives: Amy's father is in the hospital; Gary has a new girlfriend, Dana; Mike has money problems; Ben Cafferty (Kevin Dunn), the President's Chief of Staff, is depressed.
10	2	"Signals"	Chris Addison	Story by : Simon Blackwell & Armando Iannucci; Teleplay by : Simon Blackwell	April 21, 2013	1.11
Selina attends a North Carolina pig roast in support of the president's "Listen to Rural America" initiative, while her 'secret signals' get out. Dan takes up Pilates in order to gain some one-on-one time with Kent. Catherine writes a controversial essay about a film, and Mike's money situation is getting worse.
11	3	"Hostages"	Chris Addison	Story by : Armando Iannucci & Sean Gray; Teleplay by : Sean Gray	April 28, 2013	1.32
When a hostage crisis in Uzbekistan heats up, Selina and Secretary of Defense George Maddox (Isiah Whitlock, Jr.) have trouble getting on the same page during their joint appearance at the Marine Corps Base in Quantico. Sue testifies at a Congressional hearing on governmental efficiency, which turns into a 'robust' media frenzy. Dan and Gary fight for the Veep's ear. Sue's replacement, Cliff, makes a mistake which affects the Senate Swearing In Ceremony and a man's leg.
12	4	"The Vic Allen Dinner"	Chris Addison	Simon Blackwell & Armando Iannucci	May 5, 2013	1.19
Selina is rankled when the White House releases an unflattering photo of her from the hostage rescue. Mike and Kent bond over sailing, Jonah gets an executive parking space and Sue has a job interview. Selina takes steps to keep her staff happy as they prepare for her appearance at the Vic Allen dinner, steps that seem, at first, to go over well. To placate Gary, Selina has lunch with him and his girlfriend and gifts him a new Leviathan. Kent hires Mike to work on his Dream Metric Demographic program team.
13	5	"Helsinki"	Becky Martin	Story by : Ian Martin & Armando Iannucci; Teleplay by : Ian Martin	May 12, 2013	1.21
Ben and Kent argue over new intelligence concerning the hostage crisis, while Mike employs the services of Jonah to help him on a special White House project. Selina and her staff head to Helsinki to finalize a trade agreement, but are worried whether Selina will be received warmly in Europe, because of the song performed in the previous episode and while trying to teach Dan how to charm the media. Meanwhile, Selina has awkward encounters with the Finnish Prime Minister Minna Häkkinen (Sally Phillips) and her sleazy husband Osmo (Dave Foley).
14	6	"Andrew"	Christopher Morris	Story by : Armando Iannucci & Tony Roche; Teleplay by : Tony Roche	May 19, 2013	1.09
Catherine's 21st birthday party becomes a forum for Selina's budget negotiation with the majority leader, but Amy and Gary are more concerned about how Selina will handle seeing her ex-husband Andrew. Meanwhile, Mike discusses Selina's role in the Uzbek hostage crisis with the press.
15	7	"Shutdown"	Becky Martin	Story by : Simon Blackwell & Tony Roche & Armando Iannucci; Teleplay by : Simon Blackwell & Tony Roche	June 2, 2013	1.21
With D.C. in the midst of a government shutdown, Selina is forced to furlough some of her staff. Danny Chung takes advantage of the shutdown after a man is killed by a bear in Minnesota; Gary and Jonah go on a run to retrieve Selina’s trash; Dan tries to woo Sidney Purcell; also, Andrew and Selina are starting to have sex again.
16	8	"First Response"	Armando Iannucci	Story by : Roger Drew & Armando Iannucci; Teleplay by : Roger Drew	June 9, 2013	1.10
After being prepped for a "puff piece" interview at the VP residence, Selina is thrown by Janet Ryland’s (Allison Janney) "gotcha" questions. During the interview Selina's team fights to maintain her faltering image and tries to cope with new information: A damaging story leaks about Andrew, who is bragging about access to Selina's office. The government shutdown ends; Catherine has become a vegetarian.
17	9	"Running"	Tim Kirkby	Story by : Sean Gray & Armando Iannucci & Will Smith; Teleplay by : Sean Gray & Will Smith	June 16, 2013	1.03
Rumors are swirling about a possible impeachment vote and someone that might be challenging POTUS following the midterm election; the Veep continues her plans, that might consider her the 'challenger', with a meeting of party donors; after Selina has a freak accident and trips out on medication for her injuries, she makes a statement to the media that could be easily misconstrued. Dan attempts to play both sides of the Selina-Danny Chung rivalry.
18	10	"D.C."	Tim Kirkby	Armando Iannucci & Tony Roche	June 23, 2013	0.99
Selina's determined to quit as Vice President in two years, but her plans change multiple times until a final decision by POTUS; she and her team, looking for new jobs, scramble to keep up: Dan quickly lines up a few jobs; Amy is thinking about settling down with Ed, Gary is moving on with his girlfriend to the cheese business and Mike is trying to get a job with Rep. Furlong.

=== Season 3 (2014) ===
No. overall	No. in season	Title	Directed by	Written by	Original release date	U.S. viewers (millions)
19	1	"Some New Beginnings"	Chris Addison	Story by : Armando Iannucci & Sean Gray & Will Smith; Teleplay by : Sean Gray & Will Smith	April 6, 2014	0.96
Selina's in Iowa with Richard to promote her new autobiography, but also uses a book signing event to meet possible caucus voters. In addition, she starts looking for a campaign manager, even though she hasn't announced her plans to run for president publicly; at Mike's wedding, the team learns shocking news that could stand between Selina and the presidency: Secretary of Defense Maddox resigns. Jonah gets himself fired after arousing suspicion about the departure of POTUS with his blog 'West Wing Man'. Also, Selina attends a funeral with Ben and Richard.
20	2	"The Choice"	Becky Martin	Story by : Armando Iannucci & Roger Drew & Ian Martin; Teleplay by : Roger Drew & Ian Martin	April 13, 2014	0.86
After a quick visit to their new campaign HQ, Selina and her team go on a ride-along with the Coast Guard, where they learn the president has flipped on a major issue (pro-life/pro-choice), which makes Selina meet different pressure groups and re-examine her own stance. Jonah stirs chaos with his new blog called 'Ryantology', angering Dan; Mike is called into work from his honeymoon. Meanwhile, Gary questions his role with the Veep and tries to come up with new ideas for the campaign.
21	3	"Alicia"	Christopher Morris	Story by : Armando Iannucci & Sean Gray & Ian Martin; Teleplay by : Sean Gray & Ian Martin	April 20, 2014	0.77
Selina is hours away from announcing her candidacy; Mike begs Jonah not to do an article on a recent outburst but is saved by child-care advocate Alicia Bryce; Dan tries to get Saturday Night Live to apologize for a sketch they did about Selina, but ends up making it worse. Meanwhile, Doyle pressures Selina to drop universal childcare and therefore Alicia. In the midst of all, Catherine wears the same outfit as her mother.
22	4	"Clovis"	Armando Iannucci	Story by : Armando Iannucci & Kevin Cecil & Roger Drew & Andy Riley; Teleplay by : Kevin Cecil & Roger Drew & Andy Riley	April 27, 2014	0.92
On a fundraising trip to Silicon Valley, Selina is challenged by an anti-fracking mom (Lindsey Kraft) and visits the campus of Clovis, a tech company with an ambitious young CEO, Craig. At Clovis, Amy is offered a job; In D.C., Jonah makes a crude viral video of the Selina-mom encounter. Dan, with Ben's help, gets an idea for a torture rumor he can spread against Chung through Jonah. Gary begins to show signs of shoulder pains.
23	5	"Fishing"	Becky Martin	Story by : Armando Iannucci & Georgia Pritchett & Will Smith; Teleplay by : Georgia Pritchett & Will Smith	May 4, 2014	1.02
Amy and Dan compete for the role of campaign manager: Dan is nice to people and Amy invites everyone to her home, while Selina meets with a third candidate, Bill Ericsson (Diedrich Bader); Mike causes a stir collecting his semen for IVF purposes while at work for the Veep; Gary worries that his shoulder pain may prevent him from keeping his job; Selina, Dan and Gary travel to Virginia to persuade George Maddox (Isiah Whitlock, Jr.) not to run for president. Meanwhile, Jonah gets a job working for Maddox through his uncle, who controls a major voting bloc in New Hampshire.
24	6	"Detroit"	Tim Kirkby	Story by : Armando Iannucci & Kevin Cecil & David Quantick & Andy Riley; Teleplay by : Kevin Cecil & David Quantick & Andy Riley	May 11, 2014	1.06
At an economic summit in Detroit, Selina’s staff and her family, especially Andrew, are peeved by the presence of her new personal trainer, Ray (Christopher Meloni), who is also her new lover. Meanwhile, Jonah and Mike negotiate a photo-op with Selina and Maddox, which only works for Maddox. Later, Catherine protects her mom from a protester. Selina attends a women’s gun show, after an anti-gun rumor is spread by Jonah through Minna Häkkinen.
25	7	"Special Relationship"	Becky Martin	Story by : Simon Blackwell & Armando Iannucci & Tony Roche; Teleplay by : Simon Blackwell & Tony Roche	May 18, 2014	1.09
During a state visit to London, Selina is bombarded with questions regarding the influence of Ray and his online beliefs, which have been recovered by Jonah; Dan has a breakdown which could work in Amy's favor. Selina makes some appearances, including a visit to a local pub and a speech at a War Service. The team learns of the suicide attempt of the First Lady.
26	8	"Debate"	Armando Iannucci	Story by : Armando Iannucci & David Quantick & Tony Roche; Teleplay by : David Quantick & Tony Roche	June 1, 2014	1.06
The staff prepares for the debate between Selina and her rivals; Dan returns to the office after his panic attack; Gary inadvertently tells Wendy that Ray collaborated with Selina to make decisions. Selina makes a drastic change to her hair. Maddox underperforms at the debate.
27	9	"Crate"	Chris Addison	Story by : Armando Iannucci & Simon Blackwell & Georgia Pritchett; Teleplay by : Simon Blackwell & Georgia Pritchett	June 8, 2014	0.95
After Selina is caught badmouthing a reporter, putting the campaign in jeopardy, the team gets some unexpected news. Mike worries about balancing his home and work life. Selina and her staff wonder how to make her seem more down-to-earth, when they learn that Thornhill is leading in the polls. Jonah asks his mom and Bill Ericsson for help after the Maddox disaster in the previous episode.
28	10	"New Hampshire"	Chris Addison	Story by : Simon Blackwell & Armando Iannucci & Tony Roche; Teleplay by : Simon Blackwell & Tony Roche	June 8, 2014	0.95
While Selina balances her unexpected Presidency with the New Hampshire primary, Dan pushes Jonah to take the blame for the torture rumor in exchange for a job at the White House. There is a slight issue with the oath of office because of Mike's clumsiness. Selina accidentally tells Kent the wrong person to fire and 'squeaks' to the nation. To help her campaign, Selina visits a factory.

=== Season 4 (2015) ===
No. overall	No. in season	Title	Directed by	Written by	Original release date	U.S. viewers (millions)
29	1	"Joint Session"	Chris Addison	Story by : Armando Iannucci & Simon Blackwell & Georgia Pritchett; Teleplay by : Simon Blackwell & Georgia Pritchett	April 12, 2015	1.05
30	2	"East Wing"	Stephanie Laing	Story by : Armando Iannucci & Kevin Cecil & Roger Drew & Andy Riley; Teleplay by : Kevin Cecil & Roger Drew & Andy Riley	April 19, 2015	0.99
31	3	"Data"	Becky Martin	Story by : Armando Iannucci & Simon Blackwell & Neil Gibbons & Rob Gibbons; Teleplay by : Simon Blackwell & Neil Gibbons & Rob Gibbons	April 26, 2015	0.98
32	4	"Tehran"	Becky Martin	Story by : Armando Iannucci & Ian Martin & Tony Roche; Teleplay by : Ian Martin & Tony Roche	May 3, 2015	0.98
33	5	"Convention"	Stephanie Laing	Story by : Armando Iannucci & Sean Gray & David Quantick; Teleplay by : Sean Gray & David Quantick	May 10, 2015	0.82
34	6	"Storms and Pancakes"	Chris Addison	Story by : Armando Iannucci & Georgia Pritchett & Will Smith; Teleplay by : Georgia Pritchett & Will Smith	May 17, 2015	0.74
35	7	"Mommy Meyer"	Becky Martin	Story by : Armando Iannucci & Roger Drew and David Quantick; Teleplay by : Roger Drew and David Quantick	May 24, 2015	0.98
36	8	"B/ill"	Becky Martin	Story by : Armando Iannucci & Tony Roche & Andy Riley & Kevin Cecil; Teleplay by : Tony Roche & Andy Riley & Kevin Cecil	May 31, 2015	0.99
37	9	"Testimony"	Armando Iannucci	Story by : Sean Gray & Armando Iannucci & Will Smith; Teleplay by : Sean Gray & Will Smith	June 7, 2015	0.91
38	10	"Election Night"	Chris Addison	Story by : Simon Blackwell & Armando Iannucci & Tony Roche; Teleplay by : Simon Blackwell & Tony Roche	June 14, 2015	1.11

=== Season 5 (2016) ===
No. overall	No. in season	Title	Directed by	Written by	Original release date	U.S. viewers (millions)
39	1	"Morning After"	Chris Addison	David Mandel	April 24, 2016	1.10
40	2	"Nev-AD-a"	Chris Addison	Lew Morton	May 1, 2016	1.01
41	3	"The Eagle"	Chris Addison	Steve Koren	May 8, 2016	0.97
42	4	"Mother"	Dale Stern	Alex Gregory & Peter Huyck	May 15, 2016	0.97
43	5	"Thanksgiving"	Chris Addison	Sean Gray & Georgia Pritchett & Will Smith	May 22, 2016	0.92
44	6	"C**tgate"	Brad Hall	Georgia Pritchett & Will Smith	May 29, 2016	0.98
45	7	"Congressional Ball"	Maurice Marable	Billy Kimball	June 5, 2016	1.10
46	8	"Camp David"	Becky Martin	Rachel Axler	June 12, 2016	0.85
47	9	"Kissing Your Sister"	David Mandel	Erik Kenward	June 19, 2016	0.90
48	10	"Inauguration"	Becky Martin	Jim Margolis	June 26, 2016	1.15

=== Season 6 (2017) ===
No. overall	No. in season	Title	Directed by	Written by	Original release date	U.S. viewers (millions)
49	1	"Omaha"	David Mandel	Lew Morton	April 16, 2017	0.66
One year later, Dan is the co-host for CBS This Morning and interviews Selina. Amy is engaged to Buddy Calhoun, who is running for governor of Nevada. Mike is a stay-at-home dad busy with his three children, but Selina calls him in to help with her memoir. Richard is also an aide to Selina, making Gary jealous. Jonah continues his term in Congress with Kent working for him. Selina announces to her family that she plans to run for President again.
50	2	"Library"	Craig Zisk	Alex Gregory & Peter Huyck	April 23, 2017	0.63
Selina's attempts to establish her own Presidential library are hindered when she discovers that Andrew is having an affair with the woman painting her official portrait, tainting her public image. Amy must do damage control when Buddy is arrested for a DUI. Ben joins Jonah's staff and tries to set him up with a date in order to improve his public profile.
51	3	"Georgia"	Becky Martin	Billy Kimball	April 30, 2017	0.54
Selina's team travels to Georgia to act as international observers of the country's first free elections and she must deal with both Minna Häkkinen and rival bribe offers from the main candidates. Jonah deals with being shut out by his congressional colleagues. Amy tries to spin up positive publicity for Buddy, only for him to make a surprising decision.
52	4	"Justice"	Dale Stern	Rachel Axler	May 7, 2017	0.49
While Selina and Gary recover from minor health crises, rumors circulate that she's being considered for a Supreme Court nomination. Jonah's inability to understand Daylight saving time causes him problems at work but ultimately gives him a bill to champion.
53	5	"Chicklet"	Beth McCarthy-Miller	Gabrielle Allan & Jennifer Crittenden	May 14, 2017	0.62
Selina settles on a location for her presidential library; Dan lands in a gossip column; Mike and Selina work on her book and go on a cathartic fact-finding mission; Jonah tries to solidify a big donation; Gary manages a mini-crisis at Madame Tussauds.
54	6	"Qatar"	Becky Martin	Steve Hely	May 21, 2017	0.61
On a trip to Qatar, Selina attempts to earn credit for the freeing of Tibet while balancing photo ops with a warlord and a women's-rights activist; Dan files a complaint with Human Resources; Jonah negotiates with Furlong.
55	7	"Blurb"	Morgan Sackett	Ian Maxtone-Graham	May 28, 2017	0.55
Selina prepares for the unveiling of her presidential portrait, and tries to profit from publicizing her brief affair with Tom. Jonah and his followers in Congress make a power move.
56	8	"Judge"	Beth McCarthy-Miller	Ted Cohen	June 11, 2017	0.64
Selina turns Gary's birthday party into a publicity stunt; Amy and Mike try to find his diary, which contains all of Selina's secrets; Jonah's power grab backfires.
57	9	"A Woman First"	Brad Hall	Erik Kenward	June 18, 2017	0.57
Selina's book comes out, in conjunction with a scathing exposé of her time in office written using Mike's misplaced diary. Jonah's political career collapses, as does Dan's television career.
58	10	"Groundbreaking"	David Mandel	David Mandel	June 25, 2017	0.54
Selina prepares to begin construction of her Presidential library. A series of flashbacks explore the origins of Team Selina. Amy tells Dan that she is pregnant by him. Selina and Jonah both decide to run for President. Catherine gives birth to a son whom Selina names Richard.

=== Season 7 (2019) ===
No. overall	No. in season	Title	Directed by	Written by	Original release date	U.S. viewers (millions)
59	1	"Iowa"	David Mandel	Lew Morton	March 31, 2019	0.53
Selina tries desperately to arrange the perfect moment to announce her presidential campaign; Amy struggles with whether to keep her and Dan's baby; Jonah's campaign deals with the revelation that his new wife is his stepsister.
60	2	"Discovery Weekend"	Dale Stern	Billy Kimball & Erik Kenward	April 7, 2019	0.47
Selina and Tom compete to gain the support of a very important campaign donor. Amy suffers from morning sickness. Jonah's attempt to squash a potential scandal spirals out of control.
61	3	"Pledge"	Morgan Sackett	Rachel Axler	April 14, 2019	1.00
As they prepare for their first presidential debates, Selina tries to find an advantage over Senator Talbot and Jonah tries to learn to adhere to political correctness. Amy has Dan take her in for her abortion.
62	4	"South Carolina"	Beth McCarthy-Miller	Alex Gregory & Peter Huyck	April 21, 2019	1.05
Selina desperately tries to earn support from black voters ahead of the South Carolina primaries. Jonah, facing a failing campaign, tries to cut a deal with one of the other candidates. Mike starts a new news blog.
63	5	"Super Tuesday"	Becky Martin	Ted Cohen & Gabrielle Allan & Jennifer Crittenden	April 28, 2019	1.08
Selina's team scrambles to cover up her connections to China and Andrew's embezzlement scam. Jonah attempts to use his birth certificate to shame Selina's age, but makes a shocking discovery in the process. Dan begins working for Richard.
64	6	"Oslo"	Brad Hall	Steve Hely & Ian Maxtone-Graham & Dan O'Keefe & Dan Mintz	May 5, 2019	1.07
Selina is forced to take sanctuary in the Finnish embassy in Oslo with Minna after word spreads of a drone strike killing civilians during her presidency. Jonah starts an anti-vaxxing campaign, which has unexpected consequences for his family. Mike gets a new job at CBS.
65	7	"Veep"	David Mandel	David Mandel	May 12, 2019	1.10
When Tom re-enters the race, Selina takes drastic measures to return to power again which include cutting a deal with Governor Calhoun to outlaw gay marriage, offering Jonah the Vice Presidency, and sacrificing Gary to the FBI. She is ultimately successful in these efforts, but she alienates her entire inner circle in the process. Twenty-four years later, during her funeral, the death of Tom Hanks pushes Selina out of the news cycle.

== Ratings ==
Veep : U.S. viewers per episode (thousands)

Season	Episode number										Average
Season	1	2	3	4	5	6	7	8	9	10	Average
1	1380	1150	950	940	810	830	1180	1080	–		1040
2	1190	1110	1320	1190	1210	1090	1210	1100	1030	990	1140
3	960	860	770	920	1020	1060	1090	1060	950	950	910
4	1050	990	980	980	820	740	980	990	910	1110	960
5	1100	1010	970	970	920	980	1100	850	900	1150	990
6	660	630	540	490	620	610	550	640	570	540	580
7	530	470	1000	1050	1080	1070	1100	–			900

Audience measurement performed by Nielsen Media Research
