= List of Peep Show episodes =

The Peep Show Series One to Seven DVD box set. This contains the first 42 episodes, comprising the first seven series of the eventual nine broadcast.

Peep Show is a British television sitcom starring David Mitchell and Robert Webb. It was broadcast on Channel 4 in the United Kingdom. Written by Jesse Armstrong and Sam Bain, the series explores the lives of Mark Corrigan (Mitchell) and Jeremy "Jez" Usbourne (Webb). It is filmed almost entirely from the physical points-of-view of the characters, and viewers can hear the interior monologues of Mark and Jez.

At the beginning of the series, Mark is attracted to his colleague Sophie (Olivia Colman), and Jez tries to break through into the music business despite having little musical talent. Jez falls in love with Nancy (Rachel Blanchard), an American Christian, and they marry to get her a visa. She leaves him and Jez later has relationships with Michelle and Elena, followed by flings with Zahra, Joe and Megan. Mark begins to question his love for Sophie. They also marry, though Mark does not want to, and Sophie leaves him right after the wedding ceremony. Months later, they have sex once; the condom breaks and Sophie discovers she is pregnant. Sophie does not know if he, Jez or Jeff is the father. A DNA test reveals Mark to be the father, and the estranged couple have a son named Ian James. Soon after separating from Sophie, Mark begins a long-term relationship with his JLB Credit colleague Dobby.

The first series began on 19 September 2003, and the ninth and last series started on 11 November 2015. The first series was directed by Jeremy Wooding, the second and third by Tristram Shapeero and the fourth to ninth by Becky Martin. Channel 4 was planning to cancel the show after the third series because of poor viewing figures. However, high sales of DVDs encouraged them to allow the series to continue, with the fifth series commissioned before the fourth was broadcast. A sixth series was commissioned during the fifth series, and the seventh series before the sixth was broadcast.

Peep Show won the Rose d'Or for "Best European Sitcom" in 2004, "Best TV Comedy" at the British Comedy Awards in 2006 and 2007, "Best Television Comedy Actor" for Mitchell in the 2007 British Comedy Awards, "Best Returning British Sitcom of 2007" by the British Sitcom Guide (now the British Comedy Guide), the "Comedy performance" award for both Mitchell and Webb in the 2007 Royal Television Society awards, "Comedy of the Year 2008" by the British Comedy Guide, writers Bain and Armstrong won the "Writer – Comedy" award in the 2009 Royal Television Society awards, and Mitchell winning the BAFTA Television Award 2009 for "Best Comedy Performance".

== Series overview ==
Series	Episodes	Originally released	
Series	Episodes	First released	Last released
1	6	19 September 2003	24 October 2003
2	6	12 November 2004	17 December 2004
3	6	11 November 2005	16 December 2005
4	6	13 April 2007	18 May 2007
5	6	2 May 2008	6 June 2008
6	6	18 September 2009	23 October 2009
7	6	26 November 2010	29 December 2010
8	6	25 November 2012	24 December 2012
9	6	11 November 2015	16 December 2015

== Episodes ==
=== Series 1 (2003) ===
No. overall	No. in series	Title	Directed by	Written by	Original release date
1	1	"Warring Factions"	Jeremy Wooding	Jesse Armstrong & Sam Bain	19 September 2003
Late twenties Croydon flatmates Mark and Jeremy are introduced. Mark is a history-loving office worker who has never been in a relationship and is attracted to his colleague Sophie. Jez is a lazy, unemployed slacker and aspiring musician who lives in Mark's high-rise flat and leeches off him after breaking up with Big Suze and leaving her "love shack", where the couple cohabited for 18 months. The two men are competing to try to become their unhappily married next-door neighbour Toni's fuck buddy. She hosts a party, at which Mark fails in his attempt to seduce her while talking to her about the Battle of Stalingrad. Meanwhile, Jez meets her sister, whom he erroneously believes has leukaemia because she has another sister who has the disease. After this misunderstanding causes an argument, Mark and Jez are told by Toni's neighbour, Barry, to leave. During the next day, Mark picks up a metal pole that had been discarded in the street. He uses it to chase away a group of children who had been harassing and kicking him in the street during the previous night. Sophie is horrified to see this through the window of the bus that she is on. First appearances of Mark, Jeremy, Sophie, Super Hans and Toni
2	2	"The Interview"	Jeremy Wooding	Jesse Armstrong & Sam Bain	26 September 2003
Mark tells Sophie that he likes her and ineptly tries to woo her. She is in a relationship with their colleague Jeff. Jez and Super Hans' plans to form a band are halted by disagreements between them, including what the band's name should be. Toni tries to involve Jez in pyramid selling, and he tries to involve Mark. Mark tries to get Jez a job at his workplace, JLB Credit, but Jez is determined not to become employed, so he deliberately gives a bad impression of himself at his interview and tries to involve the interviewer in pyramid selling. First appearance of Jeff
3	3	"On the Pull"	Jeremy Wooding	Jesse Armstrong & Sam Bain	3 October 2003
Mark is shopping at the supermarket at 8pm on a Friday, when Jez walks in and invites him to a party that is happening that evening. At the party, Mark strikes up a rapport with sixth-form college student goth, Valerie. When all three go to a bowling alley, Jez brings Toni. At the alley, they encounter Sophie as well as Jeff, who is on a date with her. Mark has sex with Valerie at his flat, but stops when she starts to strangle him, which she does because her ex enjoyed it. Jez has sex with Toni at her flat. She makes a lot of noise so that Tony, who is in another room in the flat, hears them. Toni and Tony are separating, and argue during her sex with Jez about which of their possessions he may take with him. First appearance of Tony
4	4	"Mark Makes a Friend"	Jeremy Wooding	Jesse Armstrong & Sam Bain	10 October 2003
Mark questions his sexual orientation when he becomes infatuated with his boss, charismatic loan manager Alan Johnson, who asks Mark to join him on a business venture. Mark watches gay porn in order to try to work out if he is sexually attracted to men. Jez and Johnson quickly take a disliking to each other. Mark drives Johnson's BMW without his permission or a licence, after Jez encourages him to, and drives into a skip. At the flat, Jez tells Johnson that Mark is gay and is sexually attracted to Johnson. Mark admits to Johnson that he has feelings for him, but that he is 85% sure that he is straight. Jez tries to remember "the bad thing" that he did with Hans whilst they were on a drug binge together, which he eventually remembers was fellatio. First appearance of Alan Johnson
5	5	"Dream Job"	Jeremy Wooding	Jesse Armstrong & Sam Bain	17 October 2003
Mark urinates in Barbara's office drawer in reaction to being passed over for a promotion by her; she had given the position to Sophie instead. He has therapy, which includes word association and a Rorschach test. Jez's plan to impress Toni with his new job at a music studio where Super Hans works backfires when she becomes attracted to Hans. Inspired by the plot of the film Strangers on a Train, Jez and Mark plot to take revenge on Sophie and Hans. Jez makes a semi-threatening phone call to Sophie whilst he and Mark hide in bushes outside her house; she shoots Mark with an airgun. They go to Hans' flat, where Jez pepper-sprays and kicks Hans. Mark then pepper-sprays Jez. Back at the flat, Sophie visits and Jez pepper-sprays Mark.
6	6	"Funeral"	Jeremy Wooding	Jesse Armstrong & Sam Bain	24 October 2003
Jez finds out that his Uncle Ray is terminally ill, and Ray is moved into a hospice. Jez and Mark visit him and find out that he has become a Christian. Soon afterwards, Ray dies. Mark invites Sophie to his funeral, where Jez gives a speech. Sophie agrees to go away with Mark for a weekend in the countryside, but his enthusiasm is dampened when he finds a problem with his testicles. He is examined by a nurse (Daisy Haggard), who tells him it is a hydrocele. Toni goes on a date with a middle-aged man. Jez learns that Ray's illness is hereditary and is tested for it. Jez makes a move on Sophie, but she decides to have sex with Mark instead. Sophie and Mark are about to have sex when they are interrupted, thinking that Jez has taken an overdose. They call an ambulance for him and do not have sex. At work, Sophie tells Mark that she wants to slow things down. Jez visits Toni, telling her that he has inherited the same terminal illness as Ray, and has 3-6 months to live, in order to gain a sympathy handjob from her. She tells him that her date dumped her, reminding her of her father abandoning her when she was a child.

=== Series 2 (2004) ===
No. overall	No. in series	Title	Directed by	Written by	Original release date
7	1	"Dance Class"	Tristram Shapeero	Jesse Armstrong & Sam Bain	12 November 2004
Tony has moved back in with Toni; Jez is jealous and tells her that he loves her. Mark gets into Sophie's email account by guessing her password. He reads her emails, which include her thoughts about him and Jeff. Mark wants Sophie to find him appealing so that he can poach her from Jeff, so Mark and Jez to go to Sophie's dance class ("Rainbow Rhythms"). Sophie dances with a man, and Mark quickly becomes unpopular because of his lack of enthusiasm and for rejecting another man who tried to dance with him. Jez dances with Nancy, a beautiful young American Christian hippie, who then dances with fellow class member Gwyn. Jez and Nancy begin a taboo-breaking relationship, involving anal sex and Jez blacking up. Mark, Jez, Nancy, Sophie, Toni, Tony and Gwyn go to the pub, where Nancy surprises Jez when she describes their relationship as open. At Nancy's suggestion, she, Mark, Sophie and Jez visit Gwyn's countryside house in Tollesbury, Essex, rather than their previous plan of visiting a stone circle. Whilst at Gwyn's, they skinny dip in a nearby lake, then play spin the bottle at his house, which leads to Nancy and Gwyn having sex together. At the office, Sophie is angry when she sees Mark reading her emails; she then walks off. First appearance of Nancy
8	2	"Jeremy Makes It"	Tristram Shapeero	Jesse Armstrong & Sam Bain	19 November 2004
Toni and Tony hold a gathering to celebrate their decision to marry each other again. Jez and Mark are concerned when they notice that Super Hans has a crack habit. At the gathering, Jez bumps into Gog, whom he used to bully at school. Gog is looking for musicians for an advertisement that he is working on for Honda. Mark becomes friends with his new colleague, Daryl, with whom he shares an interest in military history, attending a World War II re-enactment together. Mark and Daryl go to Jeff's flat, where he is with Sophie; Mark is shocked when Daryl throws a brick, which smashes through the window of the flat below Jeff's. After talking to Jez about Daryl, Mark realises for certain that Daryl is a racist. After Jez, Hans, Nancy and Daryl fail to produce an acceptable soundtrack for Gog, Jez and Hans attempt to extort the rest of their commission from him by confronting him at his house. Mark ends his friendship with Daryl and tells Johnson what Daryl is like; Johnson sacks Daryl.
9	3	"Local Zero"	Tristram Shapeero	Jesse Armstrong & Sam Bain	26 November 2004
At work, Mark asks two security guards to show him on the CCTV what his colleagues are doing. He sees Sophie and Jeff kissing. Mark is filmed drinking beer in a park in a television report about nuisance drinkers while he and Jez are spying on Sophie and Jeff. After seeing Mark drinking on TV, Johnson makes Mark go to an alcoholics support group, where Mark has to tell the group that he is an alcoholic, then give details of his drinking. After Johnson sees Mark drinking beer in a pub, he ends Mark's chances of attending the business trip in Aberdeen with Sophie. Back at the office, Mark goads Jeff into hitting him, thinking it will be recorded on CCTV and cause action to be taken against Jeff. Mark is disappointed to find out from security that it was not recorded. Jez wants Nancy to be monogamous, so he tries to make her love him. He joins Nancy as she does part-time volunteer work with the homeless. She decides to make her relationship with Jez celibate. He becomes paranoid that she is having sex with homeless man Nim, whom she invites to move in with her temporarily. Jez invites him to stay at his and Mark's flat instead, to keep him away from Nancy, but Mark refuses to allow Nim to stay there.
10	4	"University Challenge"	Tristram Shapeero	Jesse Armstrong & Sam Bain	3 December 2004
Mark accompanies Jez, who is filling in with Super Hans in a band, to Dartmouth, Devon, where the band is playing. Mark is hoping to find shoe shop assistant April (played by Catherine Shepherd) whom he had recently first met in the shop. She is a student at Dartmouth University (where he and Jez met when they were students together there) and has the "magical combo of beauty and low self-esteem". Mark goes to the university, and, pretending to be a mature student, is welcomed into April's Ancient History tutorial that is led by Professor MacLeish (Peter Capaldi). Jez misses out on the frontman spot when he is delayed by being caught by a shop's manager, Mr Rashid, whilst trying to shoplift a chocolate bar. Rashid holds Jez and Mark in his store room, until they climb out of the window. Mark and April go to a get-together at the professor's house. Jez arrives, and the professor immediately takes a disliking to him. April invites Mark back to her room on campus; they kiss, but she rejects his suggestion of sex. First appearance of April
11	5	"The Man Show"	Tristram Shapeero	Jesse Armstrong & Sam Bain	10 December 2004
Sophie tells Mark that Jeff is moving in with her and that he does not want her to spend time outside work with Mark. He attempts to pretend to make friends with Jeff. Mark falsely claims to Jeff that he has gone gay, so that Jeff will no longer see him as a rival for Sophie. Mark is annoyed at being supplanted by Jez, when Jez becomes friends with Jeff. Mark joins Sophie for a charity tandem bungee jump, but pulls out of it at the last minute, which annoys and disappoints her. Jez is horrified when he sees Mark cutting his own arm with a knife; Mark says that he is doing it to make Sophie want to look after him. Mark finds out from Jeff that it is Sophie, not Jeff, who does not want Mark around her. Jez and Jeff go to a pub, and Jez tells Mark about how Jeff got off with a girl there, telling Mark that must keep it secret. Mark tells Sophie, who becomes upset about Jeff cheating on her. She goes to see Mark at Jez and Mark's flat. Sophie is followed there by Jeff, who is angry with Jez for not keeping his cheating secret. Sophie leaves with Jeff, despite Mark's attempt to repel him with a broom.
12	6	"Wedding"	Tristram Shapeero	Jesse Armstrong & Sam Bain	17 December 2004
Sophie tries to set Mark up with her friend Karen, but Mark still pines after Sophie, even more so when Sophie tells him that she has broken up with Jeff permanently. Nancy's visa has expired. She asks Jez to marry her so that she can stay in the UK, which he immediately and enthusiastically agrees to. Nancy leaves the wedding reception to attend a job interview. Mark gives a speech. After the reception, Tony leaves Toni, who invites Jez to hers and succeeds in persuading him to have sex with her. When Jez tells Nancy about his cheating, Nancy angrily leaves him. Mark almost seals the deal with Sophie after standing up to Jeff while he removes his things from her flat, although the moment is interrupted by Jeff crying as he listens to music and hugs Sophie's clothing. Mark and Sophie look on pitifully, Mark secretly glad that Jeff now knows how it feels to be humiliated in front of the woman he loves. Last appearances of Toni and Tony

=== Series 3 (2005) ===
No. overall	No. in series	Title	Directed by	Written by	Original release date
13	1	"Mugging"	Tristram Shapeero	Jesse Armstrong & Sam Bain	11 November 2005
Jez tries to break up with his girlfriend Michelle (played by Shelley Blond). She persuades him to remain in a relationship with her when she arranges a threesome with an acquaintance of hers, Vicky, on the condition that Michelle pegs him afterwards. Big Suze returns with a new boyfriend, muscular former monk Stu. Jez resents Stu because he wants Suze himself, and he is sexually attracted to Stu. Suze becomes Michelle's lodger. Mark experiences a reduction in self-confidence after he is mugged in a subway by two youths. Mark and Sophie are starting a relationship. Mark buys a folding knife, which Sophie is horrified to find he is carrying whilst on their second date. First appearance of Big Suze
14	2	"Sectioning"	Tristram Shapeero	Jesse Armstrong & Sam Bain	18 November 2005
Mark and Jez's Canadian friend from university, Merry, (Meredith MacNeill) arrives at their flat and stays the night. Her mother died recently and she is suffering a manic episode. She sexually propositions Mark, but he declines her advances. She gives away to Jez and Hans the disused pub which she owns. However, Jez disagrees with Hans' proposed new name for the pub – Free the Paedos. Mark phones the NHS to have her sectioned shortly afterwards. Mark's relationship with Sophie is put under strain when their attempt at phone sex is a disaster and she moves to Bristol for work.
15	3	"Shrooming"	Tristram Shapeero	Jesse Armstrong & Sam Bain	25 November 2005
Mark is due to attend a business trip in Frankfurt, so Jez invites Suze to a magic mushroom party at the flat. Sick with gastric flu, Mark comes home to find Hans having sex with a woman in his bed. Hans breaks the bathroom door off its hinges when he has difficulty opening it. Mark hires a carpenter, Andy, to repair the door. Andy leaves before finishing the job, and breaking the door off its hinges again when Jez tells him to finish it before he leaves. Mark is drugged and locked in his room by Jez, who hopes to seduce Big Suze. A comedy of errors ensues, with Jez trying to keep Big Suze from noticing Mark, whilst Mark is desperate to break out of his room to go to the toilet. Mark phones Johnson, who comes round and tells Jez to release Mark. Johnson sees that Mark is ill, so he removes Mark from a project at work. Everyone except Mark and Jez leave the flat. First appearance of Big Mad Andy
16	4	"Sistering"	Tristram Shapeero	Jesse Armstrong & Sam Bain	2 December 2005
Mark's sister Sarah is visiting after splitting from her husband, Simon. She starts a fling with Jez on her first night at the flat, despite Mark trying to discourage her from doing so by pointing out that Jez is married, has chlamydia and is in love with Suze. Suze is staying at the flat while asbestos is removed from her flat. Mark becomes attracted to her, but tries to hide that from Jez. Jez juggles pretending to be in love with Sarah whilst simultaneously attempting to worm his way back into the affections of Suze, who has told him that she has split up with Stu. Sarah wants to stay at the flat for a few months, but then changes her mind and goes back to Simon. Jez is delighted by that, because he just wanted a fling. In addition, he tired of her because she talks too much, is emotionally demanding and he finds her similarities with Mark off-putting during sex. Jez tells Suze, in front of Mark, that Mark loves her. Mark denies it. Sarah briefly returns, suspecting that Simon is having an affair. Jez is horrified by Sarah's return, so he walks out of the flat and asks Mark to tell her that their fling is over. Mark does so, and Sarah goes home. First appearance of Sarah
17	5	"Jurying"	Tristram Shapeero	Jesse Armstrong & Sam Bain	9 December 2005
Jez is called up for jury service. At first, he thinks it will be a black kid up on a petty theft case, and that he will vote not guilty. He finds out it is a young white woman, Carla, who is being tried for credit card fraud and initially decides to vote guilty. While the court case is ongoing Jez and Carla meet in a café and he is attracted to her, which makes him decide to vote not guilty. Jez arranges to meet Carla again, despite Mark's warning that it will be contempt of court. Sophie visits the flat with a friend. She and her friend want to go out, and Mark unsuccessfully tries to persuade Sophie to stay in. Mark, Jez, Sophie, her friends and Carla go to a gay nightclub, where most of them take drugs. The group then go to the flat, but Mark finds Sophie's friends very disagreeable and tells them to leave. Jez finds out that Carla is a habitual criminal, that he does not want her in his life, so he changes his vote to guilty. Johnson tells Mark he is not impressed with Sophie's recent attendance record or conduct and tells him to discipline her. Mark passes on the reprimand to Sophie from Johnson.
18	6	"Quantocking"	Tristram Shapeero	Jesse Armstrong & Sam Bain	16 December 2005
Since their relationship is going badly, Mark decides to propose to Sophie, using his Sunday Times mega deal vouchers for a weekend break in the Quantocks. Jez suggests to Mark that he and Suze come along, which Mark reluctantly agrees to. Jez brings Hans, without Mark's permission. Hans is going cold turkey, and asks Jez to keep him off drink and drugs. Jez regrets bringing Hans when Suze asks to come down. He is pleased when Suze arrives and is attracted to him, but has to find a way to get rid of Hans. Jez tells Mark about Hans' presence, which Mark is angry about. Sophie goes for a walk, so Mark and Jez look for her, but cannot find her in the dark. She phones Mark to tell her that she is back at the hotel. Mark and Jez become lost and Jez finds a frisbee. Mark changes his mind about marrying Sophie. They disagree about which way to walk in order to get back to the hotel, and decide to walk in different directions. Jez finds the hotel and is greeted by Suze. He tapes a bag of drugs to the frisbee and throws it hard, in order to get Hans out of the room and free it for himself and Suze. Mark arrives back to the hotel the following day. Sophie tells Mark that she found an engagement ring in his bag and accepts his proposal, even though he did not make it. He goes along with it to avoid embarrassment. Jez is puzzled and disappointed at Mark doing so.

=== Series 4 (2007) ===
No. overall	No. in series	Title	Directed by	Written by	Original release date
19	1	"Sophie's Parents"	Becky Martin	Jesse Armstrong & Sam Bain	13 April 2007
Jez is angry with Mark for wearing an identical hoodie to him. Mark's doubts over his engagement to Sophie continue whilst he and Jez visit Sophie's unhappily married parents in the countryside for her birthday. Jez is angry with Mark when he realises that he was only brought along as company for Sophie's annoying, needy, younger brother Jamie, who has no friends. Sophie's father, Ian, takes Mark and Jez hunting with shotguns. Jamie tags along, but Ian does not allow him to have a gun. Mark shoots a bird down, and is told by Ian to wring its neck to kill it. Mark pulls its head off, spurting blood over himself. Ian and Mark have an uncomfortable conversation in a local pub. Mark tells Jez that he has decided to call the wedding off. Sophie's mother, Penny, seduces Jez, which Mark is horrified about when he finds out about it. Ian overhears Mark tell Jez of his lack of love for Sophie. Ian makes Mark promise to cancel the wedding, and then takes his revenge on Dan, with whom Ian believes Penny has been unfaithful, by burning down his barn by throwing a petrol bomb at it. Mark decides that he will marry Sophie when she is given her late grandmother's cottage as a birthday present. Ian tries to make Mark tell the truth about not loving Sophie, but he refuses to, and no-one believes Ian when he says it. Mark and Jez then tell the family that it was Ian who burned the barn down. Sophie stays at the house, as Ian leaves in disgrace to visit his sister. Penny invites Jez to visit again, but he decides against it. Jamie unsuccessfully tries to get Jez and Mark to take him to London, as Jez drives away with Mark in the passenger seat. First appearances of Ian Chapman and Penny
20	2	"Conference"	Becky Martin	Jesse Armstrong & Sam Bain	20 April 2007
Seeing her in the flat, Johnson offers Jez £530 to sleep with Big Suze. When Jez proposes this deal to her, she rejects that idea and walks away whilst upset. When Jez goes to Suze's house, he finds that she is now sexually involved with Johnson. Johnson puts Mark in charge of formulating Project Zeus. It is to be departmental merger of Marketing and Sales, in which the other staff are Jeff, Sophie, Gerrard, Lisa and Katie. He is angry with them for not making progress. Mark, Sophie, their colleague Gerrard and Johnson go to Kettering for a JLB conference. Suze accompanies Johnson and Jez turns up to pursue Suze. Mark, Gerrard, Johnson and Big Suze go to a lap dancing club, where Suze pays for a lap dance for Mark. At the hotel, Sophie tells Jez that she has only had sex with four men in her life. This surprises Jez, who has had sex with more men than that, despite the large majority of his sexual partners having been women. After insulting his team for failing to come up with a plan, Mark realises that he has nothing to present to the JLB board. Mark decides to take Jez's advice and run away, but then bumps into Sophie. Upon Sophie's advice, he returns to face the truth. He tells the attendees that integrating Sales and Marketing does not work and recommends JLB Credit move into humanitarian work. He falsely claims that he is suffering from brain cancer and will be dead within a month. Johnson confirms that. First appearance of Gerrard
21	3	"Gym"	Becky Martin	Jesse Armstrong & Sam Bain	27 April 2007
In order to avoid spending time with Sophie, Mark joins a gym. Whilst there, he is assigned a tall, handsome, athletic young man, Matt, as his personal trainer. Mark tells him that he is marrying, but is not sure he wants to. Mark discovers that Jez's estranged wife Nancy is working at the same gym. She tells Mark that she has been using crystal meth and assistant managed the IMAX Bradford for 18 months. He tells Jez about Nancy, and Jez then becomes desperate to get back together with her. Jez takes a job as a cleaner at the gym in order to try to get back with her. He is disappointed when she tells him that she does not want to get back with him and that she wants to have sex with Matt. Nancy tells Jez they can be friends and encourages him to date their Polish colleague Eva. He agrees to Nancy's suggestion of a cinema double date: her and Matt; him and Eva. He tries to sabotage things between Nancy and Matt by telling him that Nancy hates him and telling Nancy that Matt only wants casual sex. Jez traps Eva in a flotation tank in order to try to get her out of the way, but Nancy hears her and releases her. Sophie thinks she and Mark spend too little time together since he joined the gym. She decides to join the gym as well, in order to spend more time with her. Mark is horrified at that, because Matt will likely tell Sophie how Mark feels about her. He and Jez decide to try to get him fired so they can both be happy. They succeed after falsely claiming to the gym's manager that Matt defecated in the swimming pool and touched Mark's penis whilst massaging Mark. He is sacked, but Mark and Jez later see him during a judo class, which he is participating in. Mark and Jez try to protect themselves by using Sophie and Nancy as human shields. Return of Nancy
22	4	"Handyman"	Becky Martin	Jesse Armstrong & Sam Bain	4 May 2007
Jez meets his hero, techno musician Russell "The Orgazoid". He is recruited as his handyman for £500 per week, and thinks that it will be a stepping stone to becoming a professional musician. Mark is suspicious, as it seems that Jez's job consists of doing minor tasks and he cannot believe that the Orgazoid will not demand much more from Jez. It later transpires that Jez must also masturbate the Orgazoid. Mark invites Sophie to his school reunion. She rejects his suggestion because she is going to Frankfurt with Jeff and their colleagues Alan and Lisa to attend a meeting. Mark goes with Jez and Nancy, and meets Sally, one of the few girls at school who liked him. She is a cleaner and is married to Foz, one of Mark's school tormentors. Mark decides to try to seduce Sally while Sophie is away. He takes her to the Orgazoid's house, pretending that it is his house and that Jez works for him in order to impress her. She tries to seduce Mark, but Foz has followed her there. Mark hides in the cupboard and Foz finds him there. Foz leaves, taking Sally with him.
23	5	"Holiday"	Becky Martin	Jesse Armstrong & Sam Bain	11 May 2007
Sophie has arranged for her and Mark to attend couples counselling, costing him a pound per minute. He is horrified when she tells the counsellor that he is not satisfying her sexually and that he ejaculates far too soon. Jez takes Mark on a stag weekend during which they stay on a canal boat on the Shropshire Union Canal. They go to a pub, where they meet two sisters, Aurora and Lucy (played by Cara Horgan and Katy Brand). After talking to them, they follow the girls, who are on a trip with their father on his boat. Jez wants to have sex with Aurora while Lucy becomes attracted to Mark. The father offers Mark a managerial job in Bangalore, India, which Mark considers as a way to avoid his impending marriage to Sophie. Jez accidentally kills Aurora's dog, "Mummy" whilst driving the family's car. After Mark discovers Mummy in their boat's bin, they try to burn the dog. It does not burn properly so Jez puts the remains in a plastic bag and brings it to the family's boat. Claiming it is turkey, he starts to eat Mummy. Aurora is horrified and angry when she discovers Mummy's collar amongst the remains, so Jez and Mark flee the family's boat.
24	6	"Wedding"	Becky Martin	Jesse Armstrong & Sam Bain	18 May 2007
It is Mark's wedding day, but he is torn about whether he should go through with it or not. Jez tries to discourage him, but Mark decides to continue. Nancy, who has stayed at the flat overnight, says that she will not attend, because she is meeting her father, who is visiting from the US. Super Hans vomits in Mark's hat and shoes, having taken too many drugs the night before. Mark tries to avoid the wedding by proposing to a barista, then trying to get run over then insulting the driver in a failed attempt to provoke him into beating him up. Nancy phones from the Heathrow Hilton to tell Jez to say that she has argued with her father and that she wants to come to the wedding after all. Soon after, Jez receives a text telling him that Super Hans is giving Nancy a lift from the Heathrow Hilton on a friend's moped instead. Jez tells Mark that he snogged Sophie at the JLB conference, which Mark tries to use as a reason to cancel the wedding. He tells Sophie's mother Penny that he has to see Sophie about her infidelity. Penny refuses to let Mark in, telling him that it is bad luck for the groom to see the bride on the wedding day prior to the service and that a drunken snog is insignificant. At the church, Mark hides upstairs whilst he tries to make up his mind about whether or not to marry Sophie. Jez wants to go to the toilet, but Mark refuses to let him do so. He then wets himself; his urine goes through the floorboards and leaks through to the ground floor where Sophie and the wedding guests are gathered. Mark and Sophie force themselves to go through with the wedding however both end up crying during the ceremony. Whilst being driven to the reception, Sophie becomes even more distraught and flees the car telling Mark he's "horrible" and that she wants an annulment. Jez sees Hans and Nancy embracing each other on a bench outside the church, then gets into the car with Mark. Last appearance of Nancy

=== Series 5 (2008) ===
No. overall	No. in series	Title	Directed by	Written by	Original release date
25	1	"Burgling"	Becky Martin	Jesse Armstrong & Sam Bain	2 May 2008
Jez persuades Mark to join him on a double date with Toni's sister, Paula and her friend Heather. However, the dates go badly. Paula tells Jez that she has chlamydia and that he may also have it and have infected other women he has had sex with. Mark's date turns out to have a love of history, which leads him to believe that she is "the one". When Mark and Jez return home from a boring play (Lust's Dominion), they find that their flat has been burgled. Next week, Mark and Jez both go out on dates again, but Mark is stood up by Heather. Jez dines with Suze, but when she tells him that she is no longer with Johnson, Jez decides not to mention the chlamydia. Mark bumps into Heather whilst walking back and invites her to the flat. Upon arrival, he discovers the burglar, stops him and locks him outside on the flat's balcony. However, the burglar rings his friends. When they arrive, Jez lets him out, only for the burglar and his friends to threaten him with burgling the flat again if Jez does not give them their television. (One of the burglar's friends, who swears at Mark and calls him "clean shirt" as he walks out with the TV, is the same character – played by the same actor – who confronted Mark in episode 1, series 1 with the same insult.) The burglars leave and Mark gets his revenge against Jez by telling Suze about Jez likely having chlamydia. Suze leaves and Jez tries to follow, but Mark restrains him. Heather expresses her dislike of him, then leaves.
26	2	"Spin War"	Becky Martin	Jesse Armstrong & Sam Bain	9 May 2008
Sophie's father, Ian, and her cousin Barney visit briefly, but Jez keeps the chain on the door and does not let them in. Barney tells Jez that she is going back to work tomorrow — three weeks earlier than she said she would — and gives Jez some music CDs he has worked on. Mark tries to deflect the bad image that has arisen around him since the marriage failed, but the only ones who take Mark's side are Johnson (who suspends Sophie when she goes too far) and a female IT worker called Dobby (played by Isy Suttie), whom he meets in the staff canteen and who moves between different branches of JLB. She gently dry humps Mark in the stationery cupboard; he ejaculates and leaves. Mark tries to resist her because he is scared that he will be treated worse by his colleagues if he starts a new relationship at work. After listening to the CDs, Jez and Hans decide to form a band with the talented but naïve Barney, so that they can get him to play the music while they make all the money. The band get a gig at a venue called The Fuck Bunker, but they lose their concentration when Barney locks himself in the toilet after fellating Hans while in a k-hole. Mark invites Dobby to the Fuck Bunker, where she leads him to the women's toilets to have sex. Before they do anything, they are interrupted by Sophie vomiting. When Sophie reveals that she is married to Mark, Dobby angrily leaves. Barney leaves and gets into Ian's car, losing the band their slot. Mark helps Sophie into the same car. Ian is angry when Jez says that Barney sucked Hans off, then he drives off with Sophie and Barney. First appearance of Dobby
27	3	"Jeremy's Broke"	Becky Martin	Jesse Armstrong & Sam Bain	16 May 2008
Mark is angry with Jez for eating his food. Jez tells Mark that he has spent all of the money his mother gave him, resulting in him being forced to find money from somewhere else. Jez donates sperm amongst other things but he cannot earn enough cash to support himself. Mark goes speed dating, where he meets an attractive but histrionic young Australian woman called Saz and she stays at his place and leeches off him. He wants a relationship with her, although it is clear that they are very unsuited to each other. Sophie arrives to deal with their breakup, and angrily walks out when she believes that Mark has used Saz to make her feel jealous. When Mark decides to keep allowing Saz to stay at the flat, at least up until his birthday party, Jez leaves. Jez goes to Suze for shelter, but she is back with Johnson and will not let him stay there. Jez steals Johnson's credit card from Suze's house. When Jez arrives at the party, he discovers Johnson has found out about the credit card and Mark agrees to pay him back. Things get even worse for Mark when Saz leaves him for Jeff, and Sophie and Dobby are dancing with other men.
28	4	"Jeremy's Mummy"	Becky Martin	Simon Blackwell	23 May 2008
Jez's great aunt Gwen dies, leaving his mother £40,000, of which she promises him half. He finds a revolver among Gwen's belongings, which he and Mark call "Gunny". Jez's mother Jackie (Tessa Wyatt) arrives with her new boyfriend, Martin. Jez dislikes Jackie and Martin, although Mark admires Martin's military past and hopes to write his memoirs. Jackie decides that Jez's money will be controlled by Mark. Mark tries to impress Martin and his butch daughter Natalie (Ingrid Oliver), but she has woman on top sex with Mark whilst he is asleep and continues, even when he wakes and tells her to stop. Martin tells Jez that Jackie's inheritance will only be £20,000. Jackie and Martin decide to buy a property in Corfu, which massively reduces Jez's share. Jez tries to sneak the gun into the couple's luggage so that they will be stopped from boarding the plane to Corfu, but Martin walks in, takes the gun and sees that it has been de-activated. He gives it back to Jez, then the couple and Natalie leave the flat. Before they leave the building, Jez tells them of the rape, which Natalie denies. As a result, Mark loses his chance to write the memoir.
29	5	"Jeremy's Manager"	Becky Martin	Jesse Armstrong & Sam Bain	30 May 2008
Jez and Hans get a manager, Cally (played by Niky Wardley), to organise a gig for their new band. Jez and Cally go on a date and end up back at the flat where they have sex, but she stops him for performing inadequately. The next morning, Mark meets Cally and begins to think that she is "the one". The band learns that they have been rejected at the festival they wanted to play at and will play at a Christian rock festival instead. Originally against playing at a religious festival, they decide to go to as they will be paid a lot of money. Mark tags along as a roadie, as a way of being around Cally. Later, Mark accidentally suggests to Cally that Jez should leave the band. He pretends to share her beliefs in the myths surrounding crystal skulls. This helps him get sex with Cally, who then tells Mark about Jez's poor sexual performance with her and teaches Mark how to improve his own sexual skills. The next day, Mark is told by Cally to tell Jez that he is out of the band. When Mark tells him, Jez vandalises some of the contents of Cally's trailer, and Mark smashes one of her crystal skulls with a brick. After Mark leaves, Cally tells Jez he will need to play the gig because Super Hans has pulled out, having left in a drugged haze to play their original gig. When Cally enters her trailer, Jez lies and says that Mark caused all the damage. She reacts by angrily leaving Mark and the festival; Jez ends up performing his music to an audience of just one man.
30	6	"Mark's Women"	Becky Martin	Jesse Armstrong & Sam Bain	6 June 2008
Mark is pleased to be promoted. When he returns to the flat, Sophie is there, high on marijuana and unusually sheepish, and gives him the annulment documents. Jez is feeling depressed, as he and Hans make a living busking. Outside "The New Wellness Centre" operated by a mysterious new religious movement, they decide to make fun of the people inside, but instead end up joining the cult. Mark finds out that Dobby likes online gaming and live role playing, as does he, so he takes part as well. While Mark begins to think that she is "the one", and Jez gets deeper into the cult, Mark ends up getting drunk and having a one-night stand with Sophie. He discovers that the old condom he used has ripped. Later, when Mark is meant to be firing Sophie, she tells him that she is pregnant, so he backs out of firing her. Jez is about to leave for the cult's compound, but is told by Sophie that he could be the father of her child; it is then revealed to the audience that they had sex right before Mark walked in at the start of the episode. Consequently, Jez decides to leave the cult, which makes Hans angry with him and Mark; Hans vandalises Mark and Jez's TV. Mark is angry with Jez for having sex with Sophie, but relieved that he may not be the father.

=== Series 6 (2009) ===
No. overall	No. in series	Title	Directed by	Written by	Original release date
31	1	"Jeremy at JLB"	Becky Martin	Jesse Armstrong & Sam Bain	18 September 2009
Mark uses the promotion he was given at the end of series 5 to buy a new sofa and get Jez a job at JLB Credit's call centre. A fire alarm on Jez's first day causes all the staff to flee the building. It turns out that the alarm was a hoax by Johnson to evacuate the building and tell them that everyone at JLB Credit's London branch is being made redundant. Mark decides to start a campaign group to get everyone's job back, so that he can have some money to pay for the sofa and keep seeing Dobby. He impersonates JLB's Frankfurt boss Steffan Strauss, while having a toothbrush moustache drawn on with marker. It goes well, but Steffan arrives and offers Mark a cheque for £15,000 to end the campaign. He agrees and takes the money, but soon after is encouraged to break into the office with Jez, Jeff, Dobby and Gerrard, which he does to get Dobby to like him more. They vandalise the office, but are interrupted by Johnson and Steffan, who arrive at the office as Jez and Dobby push the photocopier down the stairs. Steffan takes the cheque back. First appearance of Elena
32	2	"The Test"	Becky Martin	Jesse Armstrong & Sam Bain	25 September 2009
Mark makes a final play for Dobby. Meanwhile, Jez meets Elena (played by Vera Filatova), who lives in their block of flats and deals marijuana. Sophie tells Mark and Jez that Jeff is also a possible father of her baby. Mark invites Dobby – who is unaware of Sophie's pregnancy – to his flat, and Jez invites Elena there. Jez tells Elena that Sophie is pregnant by him, thinking it will impress her. Later that night, Sophie tells Jez that Mark is the father. Elena witnesses Jez's elation at the news, but Jez disguises them as part of the original version that he is the father; these two facts combined lead Mark to believe the lie as well, thereby stoking his confidence and paving his way for a sexual relationship with Dobby. Before they go to bed together, however, Mark gets the real news from Jez, and his sex drive is instantly ruined. When Sophie comes to the flat, both Elena and Dobby find out that Mark is the father. Dobby angrily leaves but, paradoxically, a humbled admission by Jez fuels Elena's interest in him and they start a relationship.
33	3	"Jeremy in Love"	Becky Martin	Simon Blackwell	2 October 2009
Jez has sex with Elena and realises he is in love with her. He resolves to be less selfish in the hope of winning her over. Mark has reservations, and thinks he should be cautious about telling her how he feels. Jez tells her that he loves her and is so determined to please her that he goes to Hastings to buy her favourite loaf of bread. She is in trouble with her boss when the boss discovers she has downloaded porn on her computer at work, so Jez tells him that he did it. Dobby encourages Mark to become a history walk tour guide. He makes an unsuccessful start by talking about mercantile history, then makes the walk a success when he sells out by switching to talking about Jack the Ripper. He loses the job when Jez makes a well-intentioned claim that he downloaded porn onto Mark's new boss' computer, not realising that Dobby had removed it.
34	4	"The Affair"	Becky Martin	Jesse Armstrong & Sam Bain	9 October 2009
Mark discovers that Jez's girlfriend Elena is in a long-term relationship, when he hears her talking on her mobile phone. Her partner has been away and is moving back in with Elena. Elena does not want to tell Jez; she pressures Mark to tell him. Jez is initially disappointed, but is relieved when Elena tells her that her partner is a woman. Mark's former boss, Johnson, offers him the chance to go into business with him. However, Mark's excitement is dampened when Alan begins to show signs of becoming mentally ill due to his fall from power at JLB. Mark gets a job as a waiter at Gail's Mexican restaurant, Banditos, only to discover that Johnson's claims were legitimate, before being amply dismissed for working at the restaurant. Jez and Elena struggle to keep their affair secret. Big Suze is disappointed with Johnson and comes to Jez and Mark's flat. Johnson comes to the flat, cons Mark out of more money and Jez arrives soon later. Johnson wrongly assumes that Big Suze is having sex with Jez and so punches him. First appearance of Gail
35	5	"The Party"	Becky Martin	Jesse Armstrong & Sam Bain	16 October 2009
As a last desperate hurrah before the baby arrives, Mark and Jez decide to throw a party. Mark sees it as his final opportunity to reignite his relationship with Dobby, while Jez think it will be a chance to improve his relationship with Elena. Hans brings a snake to the party. Sophie and Ian turn up and Mark and Sarah negotiate with them about visitation for Mark's unborn baby, before Mark vomits in a bin. Dobby leaves with Gerrard. Gail proposes to Elena, who accepts. Sarah is initially hostile to Jez, but later invites him into bed with her. Return of Sarah
36	6	"Das Boot"	Becky Martin	Jesse Armstrong & Sam Bain	23 October 2009
Elena and Gail's wedding is imminent, but Jez is busy plotting how to get rid of Gail and win Elena back. Elena tells Jez that she and Gail are moving to Quebec after the wedding. Mark, although conflicted about becoming a father, is worried that Jeff is becoming a potential rival dad. Sophie convinces a reluctant Mark to learn to drive so that he can take her to the hospital. However, he gives up trying to learn during his first lesson, because the instructor is terrible. Elena does not want Jez at the wedding, but Gail invites him. Jez and Gail get into a rowing boat and Gail accidentally falls into the water. Mark pretends he has passed his test and tries to drive Sophie to the hospital. Mark gets out of the car and Jez drives, almost running over Gail. Sophie realises that Mark cannot drive and Jez tells Gail about his affair with Elena. Sophie drives herself to the hospital with Mark and Jez in the back seat. Last appearance of Elena

=== Series 7 (2010) ===
No. overall	No. in series	Title	Directed by	Written by	Original release date
37	1	"St Hospitals"	Becky Martin	Jesse Armstrong & Sam Bain	26 November 2010
Mark, Jez and Sophie are at the hospital, where she is giving birth to Mark's baby. Elsewhere in the hospital, Jez meets Zahra, who is visiting her boyfriend, Ben, who is in a coma. Ben moves slightly, disappointing Jez, who is hoping for him to die in order to leave Zahra available. First appearances of Zahra and Ben
38	2	"Man Jam"	Becky Martin	Jesse Armstrong & Sam Bain	3 December 2010
With Dobby going out with Simon, Mark and Gerrard unite and try to break them up. However, when Dobby is once again single, they compete over her again. Dobby chooses Mark. Ben, having recovered, gives Jez a job in his music merchandising business. Jez tries to use his position to get Super Hans a record deal in return for a place in the band, but Hans rejects Jez for his poor saxophone performance. Ben thinks the band is awful and tells Jez not to sign them. First appearance of Simon
39	3	"A Beautiful Mind"	Becky Martin	Simon Blackwell	10 December 2010
In a bid to win over Zahra, Jez offers to hold her book group in his flat, but has difficulty reading Wuthering Heights, and pays Mark to read the book for him. Gail sacks Mark from his job as a waiter at Bandito's for trying to urinate in the food in revenge against an obnoxious customer. Mark comes home as the book group is underway and points out that Ben is passing off a critic's analysis of the novel as though it were his own.
40	4	"Nether Zone"	Becky Martin	Jesse Armstrong & Sam Bain	17 December 2010
Mark picks Jeremy up from Zahra's flat on the way to Mark's son's christening. After getting themselves locked between the flat and the front door of the building, Mark and Jez argue over their strategy of escape. They find a key to the flat and let themselves in. Zahra and Ben return and, after initially hiding, they reveal themselves. They falsely claim to Ben that they use the flat to have sex together, which he does not believe. Mark and Jez miss baby Ian's christening. Last appearances of Ian Chapman and Ben
41	5	"Seasonal Beatings"	Becky Martin	Jesse Armstrong & Sam Bain	24 December 2010
Mark seeks to assert himself before his sister Sarah and parents by hosting Christmas dinner with Jez at their flat. Dobby and Hans join them. Mark initially pretends that Dobby is his friend, which annoys her. When she speaks badly of her boyfriend, Mark admits that she is talking about him. Her speaking frankly angers Mark and his father; Dobby leaves early when Mark does not stand up for her after his father tells him to muzzle her. Mark is offended by his father's secondhand paper shredder as a gift and uses it to shred his father's dinner. Sarah unsuccessfully tries to seduce Jez.
42	6	"New Year's Eve"	Becky Martin	Jesse Armstrong & Sam Bain	29 December 2010
Zahra has dumped Ben for cheating on her, and invites Jez to move in with her. At a party, Dobby overhears Mark insulting her while talking to Jeff and Johnson, and leaves angrily. Mark and Jez follow her trail to Hans' party, which has become so degenerate that Hans and Jez both emerge shaken after only a few seconds. Mark, Jez, Hans and Hans' girlfriend Yoko go to Suze's party, where they find that Dobby has gone to Gerrard's party. He refuses to allow the group to enter, but Mark sees and talks to Dobby through the fence. Mark tunnels under the fence and apologises to her. He asks her to move in with him, and she accepts. After it emerges that Jez made sexual hand gestures at Yoko during Suze's party, Zahra dumps Jez, and Hans beats him with a broom. Jez's living arrangements are now uncertain. Last appearances of Zahra and Big Suze

=== Series 8 (2012) ===
No. overall	No. in series	Title	Directed by	Written by	Original release date	Viewers (millions)
43	1	"Jeremy Therapised"	Becky Martin	Jesse Armstrong & Sam Bain	25 November 2012	1.36
Jez and Hans give up their band. Jez begins therapy, paid for by Mark, but changes his mind whilst in the waiting room and instead goes to an Indian restaurant. Mark discovers this and treats Jez to an Indian takeaway while he is still full so he breaks down and admits that he had spent Mark's money on a meal for himself instead of therapy as originally promised. Mark is increasingly worried that Dobby will move in with his rival, Gerrard, who in illness has become dependent on her company. Mark's concern increases when Gerrard hints to Dobby and Mark that he would gladly allow her to live with him rent-free. Mark vandalises Dobby's microwave oven in an attempt to rush her into moving in with him. Gerrard dies of the flu and Dobby helps his sister to arrange the funeral. Mark attends interviews for a job at a bathroom supplies company, after Hans, who works there, suggests it to him. Dobby tells Mark that Gerrard left her a sum of money in his will. Last appearance of Gerrard
44	2	"Business Secrets of the Pharaohs"	Becky Martin	Jesse Armstrong & Sam Bain	2 December 2012	1.43
Mark thinks he gets a lucky break when his book, Business Secrets of the Pharaohs, is accepted by a publisher, but it turns out to be a fraudulent vanity publisher with low quality standards working out of a cargo container. This leads Mark to become heavily disillusioned with his new book and at the launch party he announces it to be a failure and leaves. Jez, in an attempt to kick-start his career, enrolls in a life coaching course. He has sex with the woman who runs the course, but they are disgusted by each others' sexual fantasies. She gives a certificate to everyone in the class except him. Mark has a fake certificate printed for him by the scamster publisher.
45	3	"The Love Bunker"	Becky Martin	Jesse Armstrong & Sam Bain	9 December 2012	1.35
Dobby's ex-boyfriend Simon invites her, Mark, Jez, and Hans to join him and his friends for paintballing. Mark is convinced that Simon is using the weekend as a cover to get back with Dobby. Jez makes a poor attempt to life-coach Simon's best friend, Neil. Mark and Hans hide in a wooden shack during the paintball game. Jez suddenly realises that he loves Dobby, and half-jokingly tells her of his feelings for her. Hans shoots at Dobby, but Jez stands in the way and is shot instead. Neil melts down after Jez's incompetent life coaching and hits Jez with his paintball gun, before running off.
46	4	"Big Mad Andy"	Becky Martin	Simon Blackwell	16 December 2012	Under 1.16
Dobby suggests to Mark that they go interrailing together, an idea that Mark tries to discourage her from. Hans becomes Mark's boss at the bathroom supplies company where they work. Jez agrees to leave the flat and move in with Hans. Mark employs mentally unstable decorator Andy (Liam Noble) to repaint the kitchen. Jez tries to help Andy by giving him free 'life coaching'. Mark enrols on an 18-month MBA evening course, where he meets Stephanie (Josephine Butler), an attractive older woman whose husband left her. Jez encourages Mark to have a fling with her. She invites Mark to her place, where they drink wine and chat. Despite the conversation going well, he leaves without telling her upon seeing a note that Dobby had left him with his lunch. Jez realises that his attempt to help Andy failed and, at Andy's request, hits him several times. Mark tells Dobby of the course that he is on and that he loves her, disappointing Jez, who wants Dobby himself. Mark and Dobby tell each other that they will interrail when they both have enough free time. Return of Big Mad Andy
47	5	"Chairman Mark"	Becky Martin	Tom Basden	23 December 2012	Under 1.08
Mark, in an attempt to deal with a damp patch on his bedroom wall to hasten the asthmatic Dobby to move in, launches a campaign to be elected chairman of the freehold committee of Apollo House. He is elected and authorises repair work to be done on his flat. Mark is sacked from his job as Jez helps him fraudulently sell taps to a bathroom supplier, claiming that they are used by Mark Ronson, before being rumbled when they are seen together by the buyer that they had just conned. Jez, desperate to avoid living with Hans, sparks up an old relationship with Mark's sister Sarah, and moves in with her and her five-year-old son, Joshy. He cannot cope with the demands she makes on him, so he wants to move back to Mark's. He refuses, so Jez stays with Andy, sleeping on his floor in a rubbish sack. He cannot cope with that, so comes back to Mark's just after Dobby has arrived to move in. Jez asks if he can stay the night and after that sleeps on Hans' floor in a sleeping bag. Dobby suggests to Mark that Jez stay at Mark's for longer and that she is fine with delaying moving in. Jez and Dobby play a video game together. Last appearances of Big Mad Andy, Sarah and Gail
48	6	"Quantocking II"	Becky Martin	Jesse Armstrong & Sam Bain	24 December 2012	Under 1.08
Jez moves into a sleeping bag at Hans' place, but the room has snakes in it. Dobby is offered a job in New York by ex-boyfriend Simon. She is uncertain about the offer, so Mark tries to persuade her to stay. He tries to get information about the position from him whilst playing five-a-side football in Hackney, but makes a fool of himself due to his lack of knowledge of and ability at the sport. He decides to take her away for the weekend in the Quantocks, where he will propose to her. Jez comes along and tells Mark that he is in love with her. Mark tells Dobby that Jez is insane. Mark and Jez physically fight whilst Dobby walks away. She texts Mark to tell him that she is taking the NY job and is flying there that night. Last appearance of Simon

=== Series 9 (2015) ===
No. overall	No. in series	Title	Directed by	Written by	Original release date	Viewers (millions)
49	1	"The William Morris Years"	Becky Martin	Jesse Armstrong & Sam Bain	11 November 2015	1.79
Mark and Jez meet for the first time in six months to attend the stag do for a supposedly sober Hans. Jez is reluctant to apologise to Mark. Jez is sleeping in Hans' bath, until he evicts him from the flat by having Jez pretend to be in possession of Hans' cocaine. Mark has a new job at a bank, which Johnson helped him to obtain. Mark's colleague Jerry has moved in with Mark. Mark grants Jez a loan at his bank. Jez persuades Mark to evict Jerry and allow him to move back in. Jez calls Hans to assist with the eviction, where Jerry is bagged up, waterboarded with beer and left in a lift. First appearances of Megan, Molly and Jerry
50	2	"Gregory's Beard"	Becky Martin	Jesse Armstrong & Sam Bain	18 November 2015	1.26
Hans asks Mark to be the best man at his wedding to Molly because he wants a conventional guy to perform that role. It is revealed during the wedding that his real name is Simon. Dobby, having taken on a new hipster personality in New York, returns to attend the wedding and brings Gregory, her American boyfriend. Jez coaches Megan at her place, where he meets her boyfriend, Joe. Mark puts webcams in the flat. He views the webcams on a laptop, along with Dobby, Gregory and Hans who all see Jez have sex with Joe in Mark's bedroom. Mark, Jez, Dobby and Hans travel to rural Norfolk for the wedding. Gregory finds out that Mark was following Dobby's movements on her phone and punches him, only after Mark finds himself no longer enamoured with Dobby. Jez gives an awful speech at the reception. First appearance of Joe and last appearance of Dobby
51	3	"Threeism"	Becky Martin	Jesse Armstrong & Sam Bain	25 November 2015	1.33
Mark tracks down April (whom he had unsuccessfully tried to seduce by returning to his alma mater, Dartmouth University, and pretending to be a History student years earlier, in series 2, episode 4), at a book signing. She tells him that she writes with her husband Angus and that she lectures at a college. He invites her to a dinner party at the flat that he claims he is holding tomorrow. April says that her husband will be unable to attend because he will be going to a conference, so Mark tries to rekindle his relationship with her. She later tells him that Angus will be attending after all. Due to a lack of ingredients in the flat, combined with the short notice of the dinner party, Mark has to resort to using the only ingredients available in his kitchen, concocting an egg, lettuce and baked bean casserole as well as a lettuce cocktail, both of which he passes of as Moroccan. Jez starts a sexual relationship with Megan, as well as being in one with Joe. Megan turns up at the flat whilst Joe is there. Mark tells Jez, Joe and Megan to stay for dinner, to convince Angus that the dinner party is genuine. Joe and Megan find out that they're both having sex with Jez, so they decide to try a three-way relationship, but they disagree on who will have sex with whom on which days. Return of April and first appearance of Angus
52	4	"Mole-Mapping"	Becky Martin	Jon Brown	2 December 2015	1.26
Megan is angry with Joe, after the couple split up. Joe starts growing suspicious about Jez's claims of success, including having life-coached Jenson Button and the Queen. Jez falsely claims he has his own office and Joe says he will visit him there, so Jez rents an office. Mark and Jez play tennis against April and Angus. Mark and April have their moles mapped. Mark continues in his attempts to sabotage the marriage of April and Angus by encouraging Angus' obsession with the Byzantine Church and unfairly refusing Angus a loan. Hans introduces Jez to his friend Wadey and asks Jez to enable an armed robbery at Mark's bank, which Wadey intends to commit. Wadey goes to the bank, but walks out without robbing it. Jerry grants Angus a loan.
53	5	"Kid Farm"	Becky Martin	Jesse Armstrong & Sam Bain	9 December 2015	1.33
Jez and Hans publish their first track on a football video on YouTube, but they disagree of the authorship of the lyrics. Jez tags along with Mark when he takes his son Ian for playtime at a soft play centre in Thornton Heath called the Kid Kave. Sophie visits the flat and tells Mark that she thinks her boyfriend, a tutor, is having an affair with the mother of one of his pupils. Sophie suggests that she and Mark reconcile. April arrives at the door whilst Sophie is still in the flat; Mark suggests that April and her niece join him and Ian at Kid Kave, but April declines his suggestion and tells Mark that she does not want a relationship with him. Jez tells Mark that he brought one of Hans' snakes in his bag. April later turns up at Kid Kave with her niece. She and Mark have sex in a toilet. Sophie turns up at Kid Kave whilst drunk and falls asleep in a ball pit. Mark tries to decide between miserable stability with Sophie, or whether to continue to pursue April. The snake escapes, so Mark and Jez leave. Return and last appearance of Sophie
54	6	"Are We Going to Be Alright?"	Becky Martin	Jesse Armstrong & Sam Bain	16 December 2015	1.15
Jez turns 40 and Mark is throwing a party for him. Jez has told Joe (who is in his late twenties) that he is turning 39. Jez starts drinking his own urine, believing it will help him stay youthful. Mark is dismissed from his job for not following proper procedure when granting Jez his loan. Mark tracks down April with the intention of poaching her from Angus. Mark and April go to a café, where they drink coffee. April tells Mark that she and Angus are going on a cruise together, but she receives a blunt and dismissive text from Angus, telling her that he is going to Ibiza instead of the cruise. Mark and April have sex in the café's toilet. Mark returns to the flat and tells Jez that he is going on the cruise with April. Mark discovers that Jez and Hans have kidnapped Angus and are holding him at the flat. Guests, including April, arrive for Jez's party. Angus comes into the room where the party is, telling everyone what happened. Joe finds out that Jez is 40 and Jez tells Joe that he cannot keep up with Joe's partying lifestyle; Joe decides to go back to Megan. April leaves with Angus. Hans splits from Molly and says he is emigrating to North Macedonia. In the final scene, Mark and Jez ask each other inane questions; Jez's final narration is him noting that he and Mark really do love each other while Mark reminds himself he "simply must get rid of him." Last appearances of Mark, Jeremy, Super Hans, Jeff, Alan Johnson, April, Megan, Joe, Angus, Jerry and Molly
