= Becky Martin =

British television director and producer

- Occupation: Television director
- Notable work: Peep Show

Becky Martin is a British television director and producer.

== Career ==
Among her directorial credits are episodes of Peep Show, Pete versus Life, Getting On, Veep, Succession and Avenue 5. In 2017, Martin won the Directors Guild of America Award for Outstanding Directorial Achievement in a Comedy Series for "Inauguration", Veep's season-five finale.

Martin directed Peep Show series four to nine. In 2010, series six was nominated for the British Academy Television Award for Best Situation Comedy, and series nine was nominated in 2016 in the "Scripted Comedy" category. She also directed the 2007 Comedy Showcase installment Ladies and Gentlemen.
