= Veep =

2012–2019 American comedy television series

- Genre: Political satire
- Created by: Armando Iannucci
- Showrunners: Armando Iannucci (seasons 1–4); David Mandel (seasons 5–7)
- Starring: Julia Louis-Dreyfus; Anna Chlumsky; Tony Hale; Reid Scott; Timothy Simons; Matt Walsh; Sufe Bradshaw; Kevin Dunn; Gary Cole; Sam Richardson; Sarah Sutherland; Clea DuVall
- Composers: Rupert Gregson-Williams; Christopher Willis
- Country of origin: United States
- Original language: English
- No. of seasons: 7
- No. of episodes: 65 (list of episodes)

Production
- Executive producers: Armando Iannucci; Christopher Godsick; Frank Rich; Chris Addison; Simon Blackwell; Tony Roche; Julia Louis-Dreyfus; Stephanie Laing; David Mandel
- Production locations: Baltimore, Maryland (seasons 1–4); Los Angeles, California (seasons 5–7)
- Camera setup: Single camera
- Running time: 26–30 minutes
- Production companies: HBO Entertainment; Dundee Productions (Seasons 1–4); Second in Command Productions, LLC
- Budget: $27+ million (s. 5) (Note: This amount represents the total qualified expenditures for the California Film & Television Tax Credit and excludes other non-qualifying costs.); $31+ million (s. 6); $36+ million (s. 7)

Original release
- Network: HBO
- Release: April 22, 2012 – May 12, 2019

Related
- The Thick of It; In the Loop

Veep is an American political satire comedy television series that aired on HBO from April 22, 2012, to May 12, 2019. The series was created by Armando Iannucci. The series follows Selina Meyer (Julia Louis-Dreyfus), the fictional Vice President of the United States, and her team as they attempt to make their mark and leave a legacy but often instead become mired in day-to-day political games.

Veep received critical acclaim and won several major awards, including seven consecutive nominations for the Primetime Emmy Award for Outstanding Comedy Series, winning that award for its fourth, fifth, and sixth seasons. Its second, fourth, and sixth seasons won the Writers Guild of America Award for Television: Comedy Series, and its third season won the Television Critics Association Award for Outstanding Achievement in Comedy. Louis-Dreyfus's performance won her six Primetime Emmy Awards, three Screen Actors Guild Awards, two Critics' Choice Television Awards, a Television Critics Association Award, and five consecutive Golden Globe nominations. For his portrayal of Selina's personal aide, Gary, Tony Hale received six Emmy nominations and two wins for Outstanding Supporting Actor in a Comedy Series.

Veep is widely regarded as a landmark in political satire and is often cited among the best television comedies. It has been ranked among the greatest TV shows of all time by The Guardian, BBC, Rolling Stone, and Variety.

== Synopsis ==
The series follows the personal life and political career of Selina Meyer (Julia Louis-Dreyfus), Vice President and, later, President of the United States. Her party affiliation is never discussed (although the party was coloured blue in an electoral map). Formerly a United States senator from Maryland, Meyer campaigns for her party's nomination in the 2012 presidential election and is initially the front-runner, but ultimately loses the nomination to Stuart Hughes. Meyer subsequently joins the Hughes ticket as his running mate and is elected vice president. Her staff as vice president, upon whom Meyer is almost totally reliant, includes chief of staff Amy Brookheimer (Anna Chlumsky), director of communications Mike McLintock (Matt Walsh), deputy director of communications Dan Egan (Reid Scott), body man Gary Walsh (Tony Hale), and personal secretary Sue Wilson (Sufe Bradshaw). Later additions to her team as president include White House Chief of Staff Ben Cafferty (Kevin Dunn) and political strategist Kent Davison (Gary Cole). Jonah Ryan (Timothy Simons), initially a White House liaison to the vice president's office and later a New Hampshire congressman, also features prominently.

Meyer frequently finds herself sidelined and ignored by Hughes, who is never depicted on-screen at the outset of the series. In the second season, Meyer comes to accrue some power and influence and, by the end of the season, is actively considering challenging Hughes for their party's nomination in the 2016 election. This becomes a moot point when Hughes abruptly resigns due to his wife's poor mental health and Meyer becomes president. Meyer begins her presidential campaign at the end of the third season. The fourth season finds her adjusting to her new role while continuing her presidential campaign, both of which are undermined by a series of scandals. The election results in a tie between Meyer and challenger Bill O'Brien (Brad Leland), leading to a contingent election in the House of Representatives during the fifth season to decide the next president after a recount in Nevada fails to alter the election's outcome. The House vote ends in a tie, meaning that when the Senate votes to elect the vice president the winner will be the next president. The Senate vote also ends in a tie; Meyer's disgruntled Vice President Andrew Doyle (Phil Reeves), who did not run for a full term, casts the tiebreaking vote for O'Brien's running mate Laura Montez (Andrea Savage) instead of Meyer's running mate Tom James (Hugh Laurie), leading to Montez becoming president. The sixth season follows Meyer out of office for the first time in the series, as she attempts to ensure her legacy by authoring a memoir, setting up a foundation and attempting to establish a presidential library. At the end of the season, Meyer decides to run for president again. The seventh season sees Meyer attempting to run for president once again in the 2020 election, featuring her former political rivals Ryan and James as major competitors, in addition to introducing the young, likable, and progressive challenger Kemi Talbot (Toks Olagundoye).

The series also explores Meyer's personal life, such as her strained relationships with her daughter Catherine (Sarah Sutherland), ex-husband Andrew (David Pasquesi), and several significant others. The lives, careers, and relationships of the other characters are also explored, frequently intersecting with the series' principal narrative, satirizing the political activities and inner workings of the contemporary U.S. government.

== Cast and characters ==
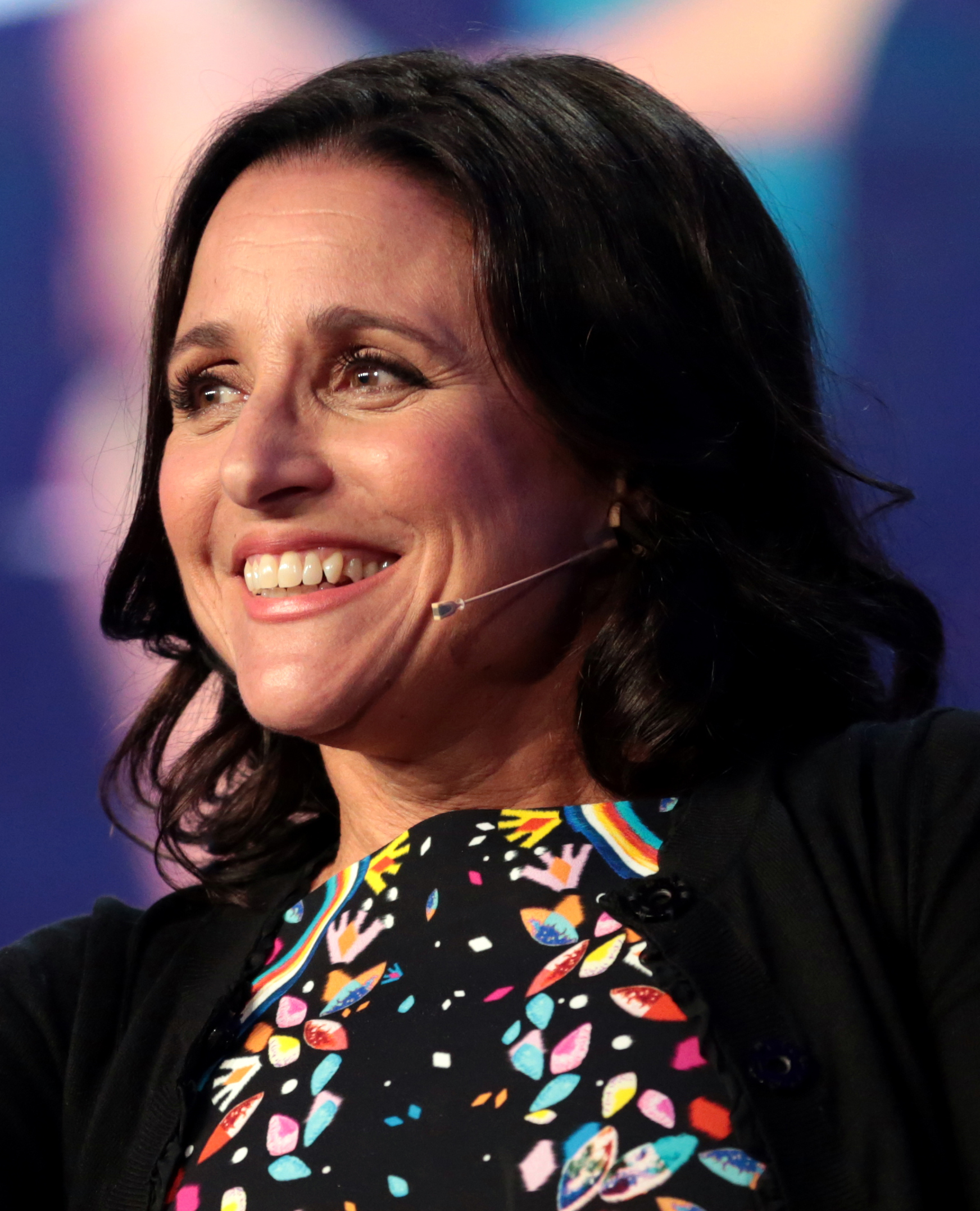
Julia Louis-Dreyfus, who portrays Selina Meyer

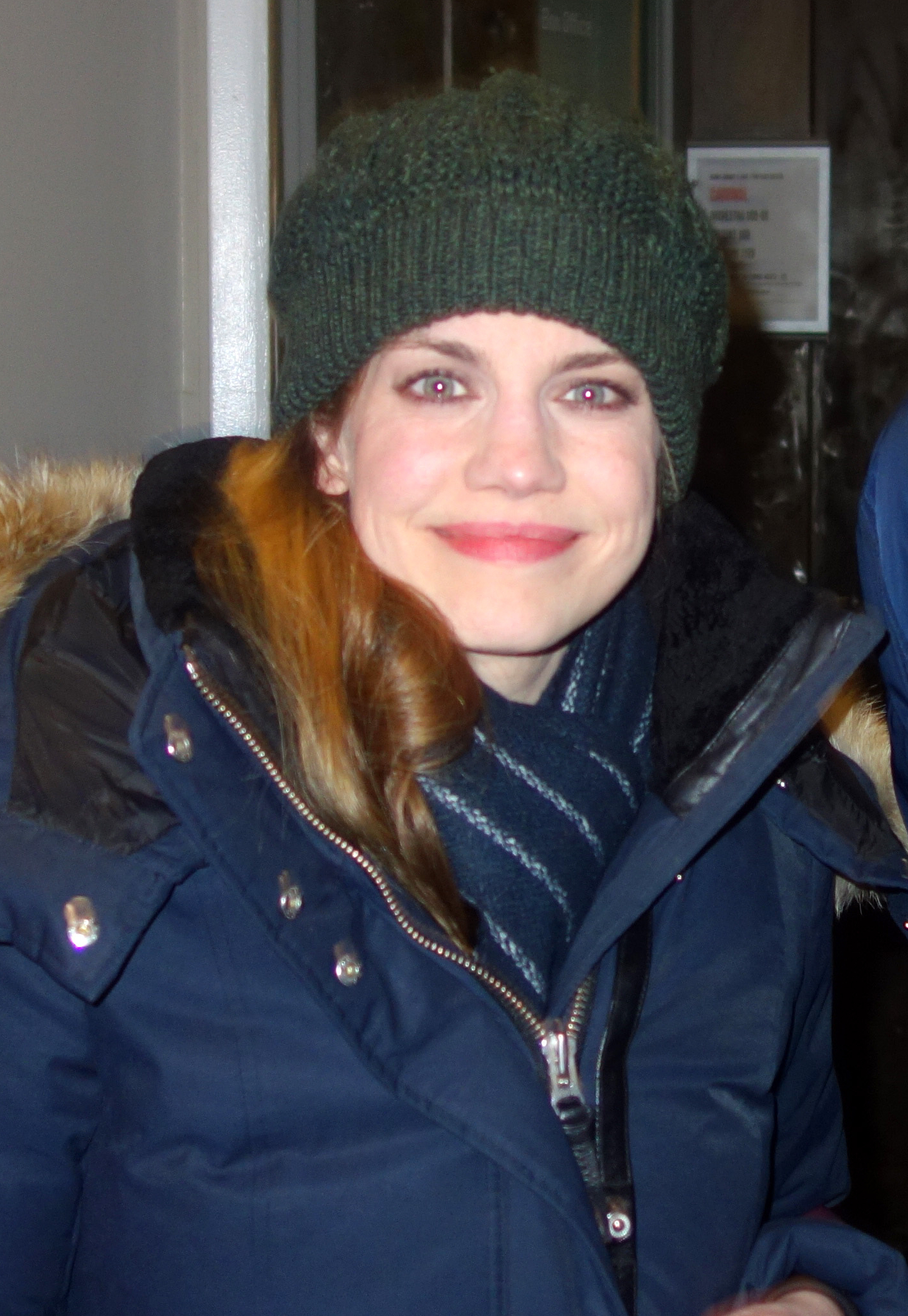
Anna Chlumsky, who portrays Amy Brookheimer

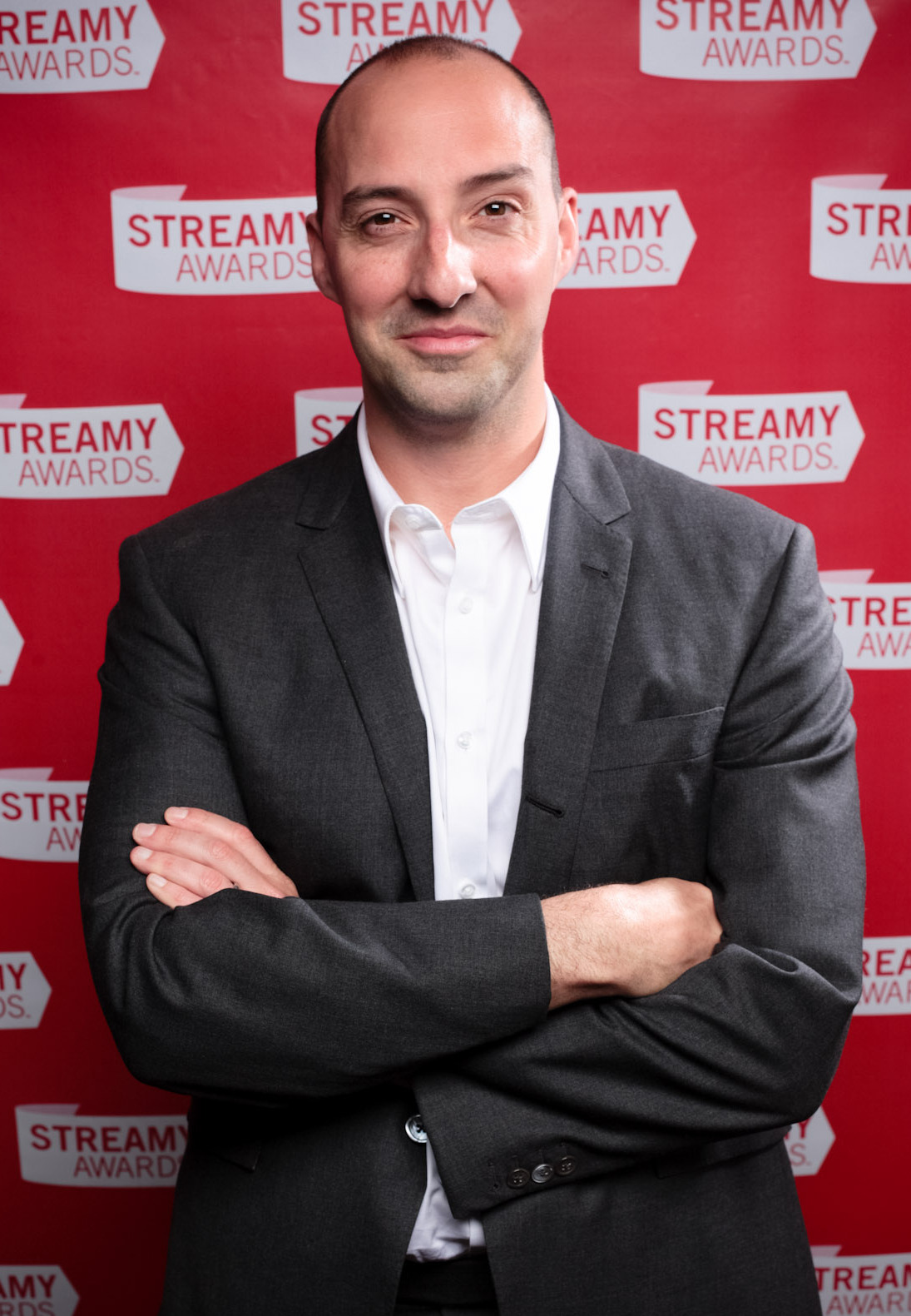
Tony Hale, who portrays Gary Walsh

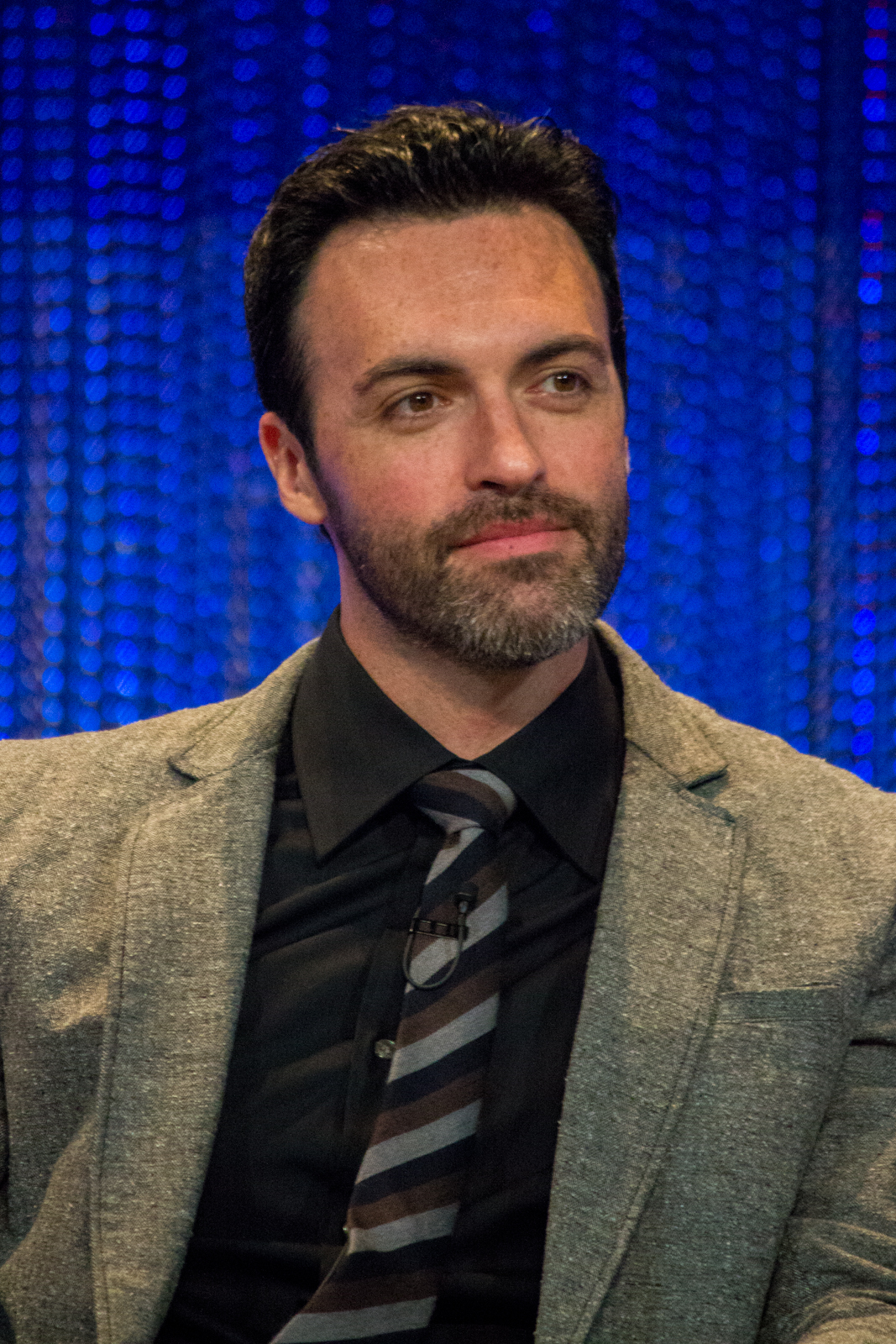
Reid Scott, who portrays Dan Egan

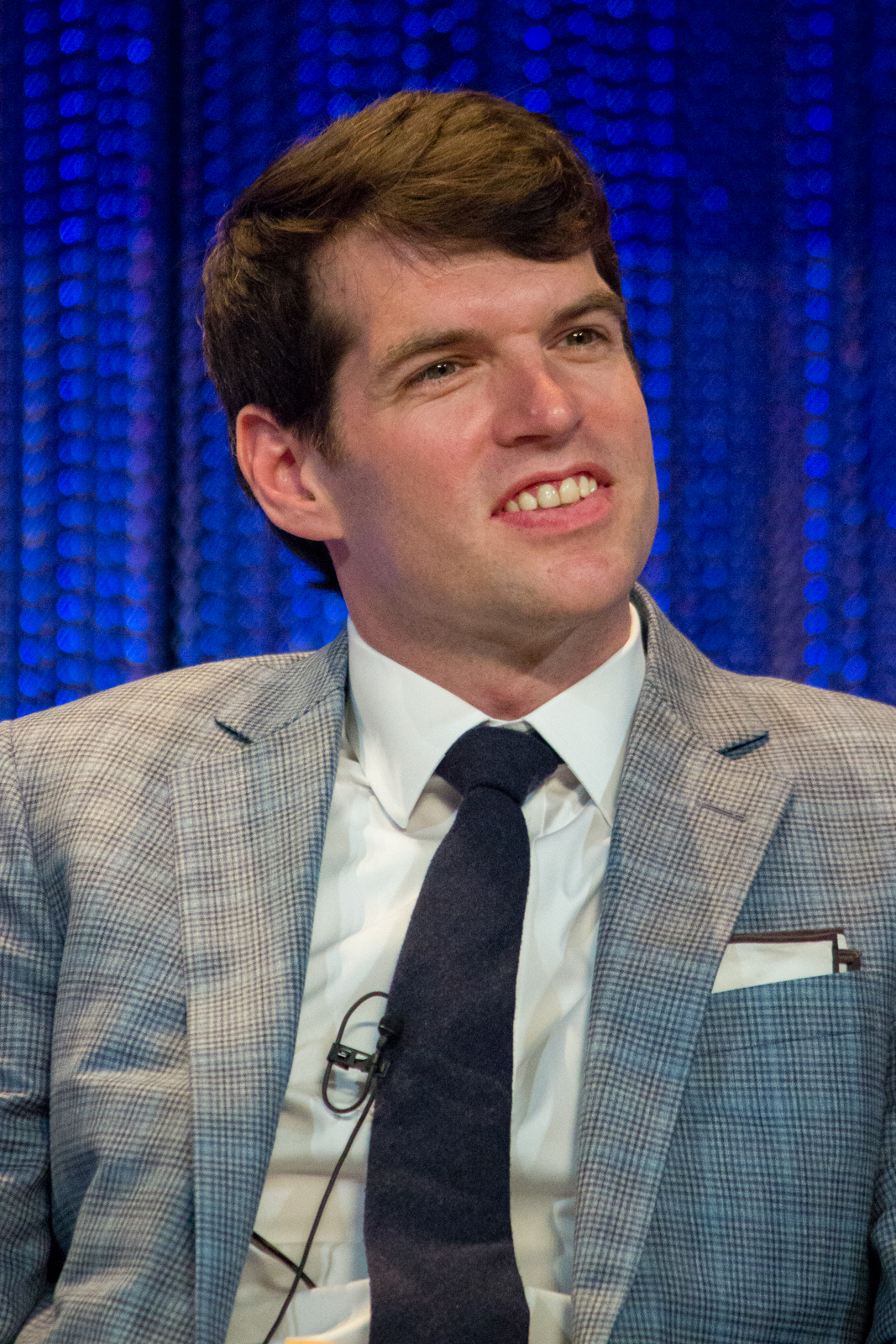
Timothy Simons, who portrays Jonah Ryan

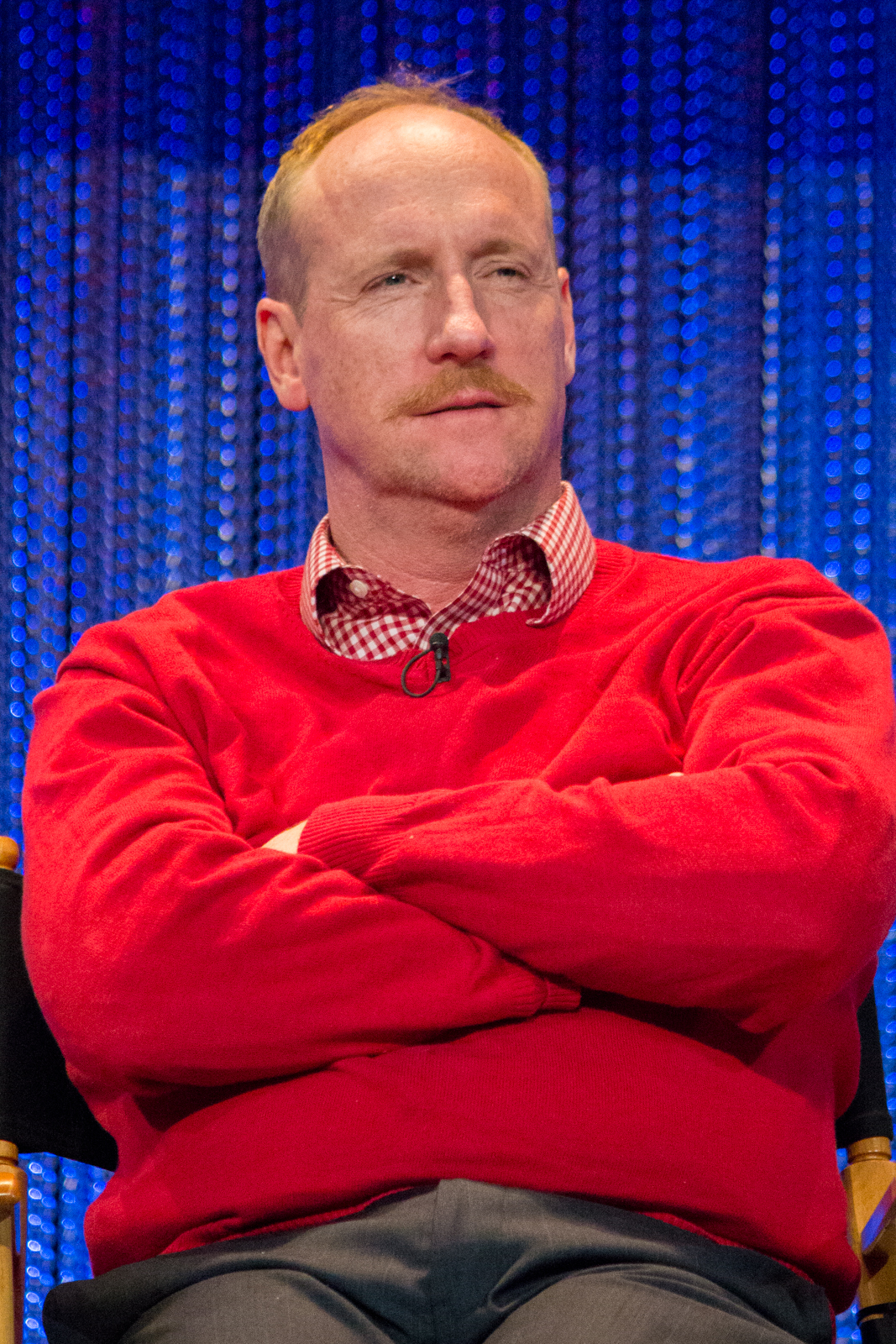
Matt Walsh, who portrays Mike McLintock

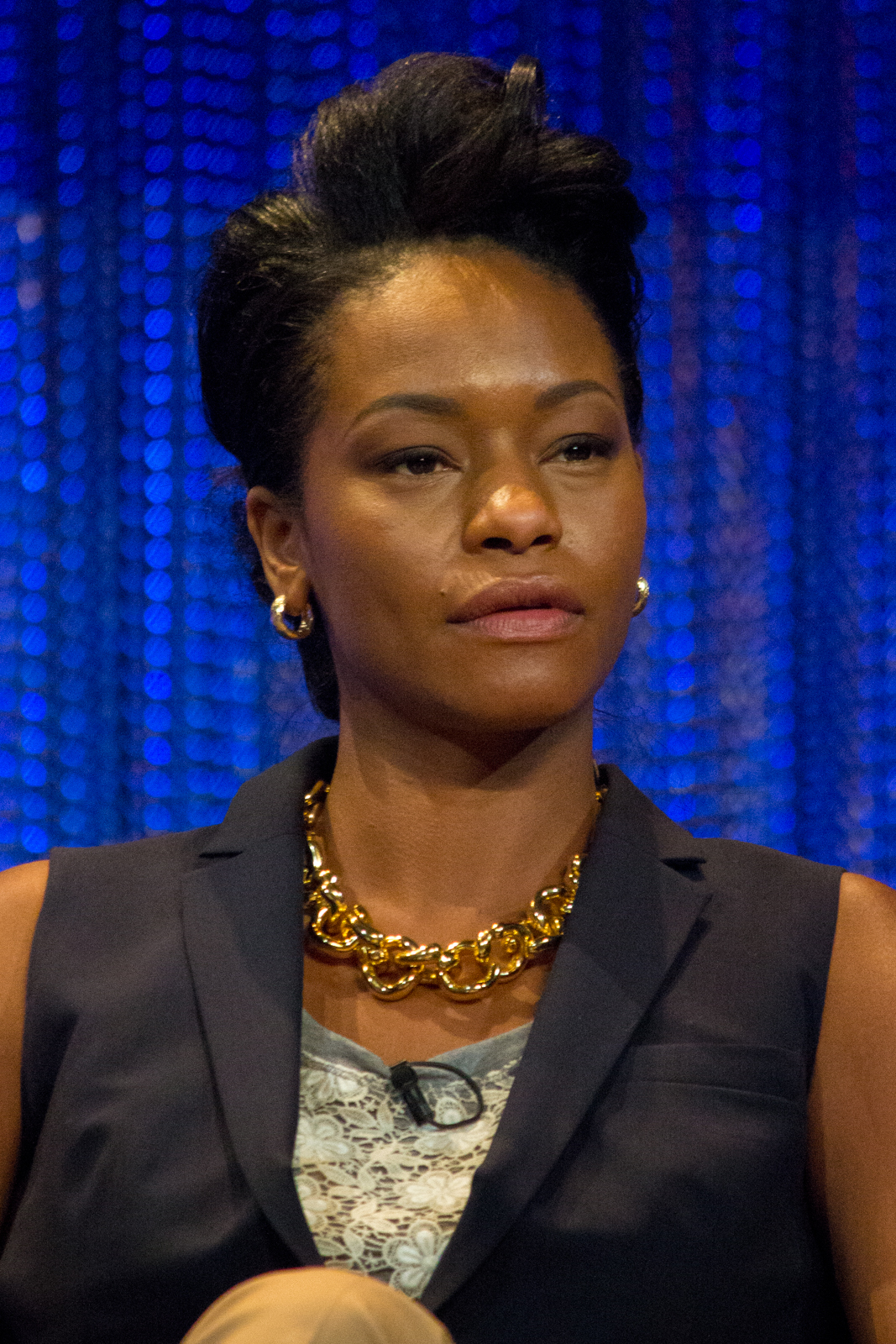
Sufe Bradshaw, who portrays Sue Wilson

- Julia Louis-Dreyfus as Selina Meyer (née Eaton): Born Selina Catherine Eaton, a former U.S. Senator from Maryland who, in the start of the series, is the titular Vice President, or "Veep." She has a strained relationship with the President. After the president declines to run for a second term, she begins campaigning for the presidency in Season 3. At the end of Season 3, she becomes president when he resigns for personal issues. Due to a complex manipulation of constitutional law, she loses the presidential race in Season 5. After trying to decide what her post-presidential legacy should be during Season 6, she decides to run for another term as president by Season 7. She is divorced with one daughter, but remains romantically entangled with her ex-husband during the first two seasons and the sixth. She seems to display little or no maternal instinct towards her daughter. Louis-Dreyfus has received widespread critical acclaim for her performance, winning a record-breaking six Primetime Emmy Awards and three Screen Actors Guild Awards, and receiving five consecutive Golden Globe nominations.
- Anna Chlumsky as Amy Brookheimer: the Vice President's Chief of Staff. She credits herself as the vice president's "trouble-shooter, problem-solver, issue-mediator, doubt-remover, conscience-examiner, thought-thinker and all-round everything-doer". Amy is constantly sacrificing her own reputation to save Selina's political credibility. She is known to be uptight and overly dedicated to her career, unwilling to settle down and have children, much to the dismay of her family. She has romantic history with Dan, and may still have feelings for him. She has a few different boyfriends throughout the series, including a fundraiser for Selina and a Nevada politician. Amy becomes Selina's campaign manager during her presidential run, but resigns as a result of the brief appointment of an equivocating, yet omnipresent, old friend of Selina's to the campaign team. She rejoins the Meyer team when a tie in the general election leads to a statewide recount in Nevada. At the end of season 6 it is revealed that after a one-night stand with Dan, she is pregnant with his child. However, she gets an abortion in Season 7, mainly due to Dan's inability to settle down. Also in Season 7, Amy leaves Selina's team to join Jonah's presidential campaign, becoming his campaign manager and encouraging his unorthodox demeanor and presentation of conspiracy theories as fact. Chlumsky previously portrayed a similar character, Liza Weld, in Iannucci's 2009 film, In the Loop. She received six consecutive Primetime Emmy Award nominations for her performance.
- Tony Hale as Gary Walsh: Selina's personal aide and body man. A long-term associate and confidant of Selina, Gary is portrayed as incredibly loyal and devoted. Despite his menial job, Gary is actually a graduate of Cornell University, having majored in hotel management. In the fourth and fifth seasons, Gary is portrayed as having issues adapting to Selina's presidency, since he can no longer be as close to her as previously, due to lack of security clearance. When Selina fails to win reelection, he stays on as her personal aide. Hale describes Gary's loyalty to Selina stemming from the idea that the character "is one of those guys who never really had an identity. He attached himself to people to find who he was." Hale received two Primetime Emmy Awards for his performance on the series, with four further nominations.
- Reid Scott as Dan Egan: the deputy director of communications in the Vice President's Office. Dan is a highly ambitious, cutthroat up-and-comer in D.C. who takes pride in his contacts and networking skills. He has dated the daughters of influential politicians to get ahead in his career. He often butts heads with Amy, whom he previously dated (and it is suggested he may still have feelings for her). He has a brief stint as Selina's campaign manager for her presidential campaign but is fired from that position after having a nervous breakdown following several crises. He resumes his post in Communications but is fired as a scapegoat amid a data-theft scandal. After briefly working unsuccessfully as a lobbyist and as a CNN analyst, he returns to the campaign staff, as a senior campaign official. When Selina fails to win reelection, Dan goes to work as a lead anchor on CBS This Morning. In Season 7, he joins Selina's new reelection campaign.
- Timothy Simons as Jonah Ryan: the White House liaison to Vice President Meyer's office. He constantly clashes with most members of the Veep's office, particularly Amy. Everyone he encounters dislikes him, even foreign politicians. In the third season, he is temporarily fired from the White House for running a blog disclosing insider information, leading him to create his own news website, Ryantology. In season four, he works again as a liaison, this time between President Meyer and Vice President Doyle. He later works for the Meyer general election campaign, until a New Hampshire congressman dies. He is then drafted to run for that seat in order to secure Meyer's vote in the electoral college. He is elected and becomes a congressman, appointing Richard as his chief of staff; as he begins his congressional term, he is diagnosed with testicular cancer and undergoes treatment, entering remission by Season 6. In Season 7, Jonah launches a presidential campaign to compete with Selina for the nomination of their party; while initially a long-shot candidacy, Jonah begins to gain traction by promoting numerous conspiracy theories, such as supporting the anti-vax movement and alleging that math was created by Muslims and should not be taught in schools. Amy joins his campaign as his campaign manager. He ultimately becomes vice president in the second Meyer administration. According to Matt Walsh, Jonah Ryan was originally envisioned by the show's writers as "just a fat, short, heavy smoker," but was changed to his current characterization after Simons auditioned for the role.
- Matt Walsh as Mike McLintock: the vice president's director of communications. Mike has served as her communications director since her tenure as senator from Maryland. His career dedication is often questionable, to the extent that he pretends to have a pet dog so he can escape from work commitments. The other characters in the show often mock his lack of ambition, suggesting that he has reached the peak of his career. He is often portrayed as lacking the skills required for the job. In the third season, he marries a reporter named Wendy Keegan. In Season 4, Mike becomes the White House Press Secretary. In Season 5, Mike and Wendy attempt to adopt a baby. They ultimately adopt a Chinese toddler, and also have twins via a surrogate. In Season 6, Selina employs him to write her biography A Woman First, but a scandal arises soon after its publication whereby the true nature of the Meyer Administration was revealed due to him leaving the diary he used for research at the offices of The Washington Post. Walsh received two Primetime Emmy Award nominations for his performance.
- Sufe Bradshaw as Sue Wilson: the vice president's personal secretary. A direct and no-nonsense personality, Sue boasts she is the third most important person in the world, as she is the one who controls which people get to see Selina, the second most important person in the world. During a committee inquiry into Selina's office, the chairperson states that Sue "could organize the D-Day landings and still have time for Iwo Jima." Sue becomes the Chief of Scheduling for the White House in Season 4. She remains in that capacity when President Montez is inaugurated. Bradshaw based her character on that of a DMV employee, elaborating that, "DMV workers are strait-laced and go by the book, and they don't have much time because there's so much to do in a day." (seasons 1–5; guest season 7)
- Kevin Dunn as Ben Cafferty: the White House Chief of Staff, under both the unseen former president and President Meyer. Although he is depressed and a high-functioning alcoholic, he is often very insightful and is treated with respect and even fear throughout Washington. Ben shows little regard for his co-workers or his job, and appears to love his nine-cup coffee thermos more than anything else. Selina refers to him as a "burned-out loser," but he apparently considers her a close friend and resolves to help her become president. Though he was planning on leaving the White House imminently, he agrees to remain with the administration indefinitely. When Selina fails to win reelection, he joins Congressman Ryan's staff with Kent. (Seasons 3–7; recurring season 2)
- Gary Cole as Kent Davison: the senior strategist to the president, under both the unseen former president Hughes and later President Meyer. He is a number-cruncher, and is often referred to as being cold and robotic. His obsession with polling statistics negatively influences the President's decision-making during several episodes in the second season. Kent is also focused on the public images of Selina and Catherine. It is implied that he and Sue are in some form of romantic relationship. Although Selina initially dislikes him, she comes to appreciate his useful polling and statistical data, and he becomes a key part of her presidential administration. When Selina fails to win reelection, he joins Congressman Ryan's staff with Ben. Cole received a Primetime Emmy Award nomination for his performance. (seasons 4–7; recurring seasons 2–3)
- Sam Richardson as Richard Splett: an amiable, if not always completely competent, campaign aide who fills in for Gary during Selina's book tour, later becoming Amy's assistant on Selina's presidential campaign, and then briefly Jonah's personal assistant. Splett is cheerful and often the butt of jokes. In Season 5, Selina promotes Richard after discovering he has a doctorate in electoral law. As part of Richard's promotion, Jonah becomes his assistant. When Jonah is elected to Congress, Richard becomes his chief of staff. Richard makes many allusions to his blog, splettnet.net. After losing the presidency, Selina hires him to be her chief of staff for the Meyer Fund. During season 6, he becomes the sperm donor for Catherine and Marjorie's baby. Richard begins his own political career in season 7, after being asked to serve as mayor of his small hometown in Iowa. He quickly rises through the ranks, becoming Lieutenant Governor of Iowa after accidentally exposing a corruption scandal that causes the incumbent to resign, and Governor after Jonah accidentally infects the incumbent with a deadly strain of chickenpox. In the season 7 epilogue, Richard is revealed to have become a successful two-term president. (seasons 4–7; recurring season 3)
- Sarah Sutherland as Catherine Meyer: Selina's reserved, put-upon daughter. Catherine is often caught in the middle of Selina's issues, especially with her father. She is generally unable to gain her mother's respect or attention. She tends to have highly liberal views concerning social justice. During the first four seasons, she is a film major at Vassar College. She briefly attracts attention for dating a Persian student. Later, she dates and becomes engaged to a lobbyist her mother dislikes. Selina initiates the demise of their relationship by declaring that they've broken up during an inquiry into her administration. Catherine goes along with the breakup to protect her mother's administration. She is seen in the fifth season filming a documentary based on the unprecedented Electoral-College tie that concludes Selina's presidential run, and she becomes romantically involved with her mother's lookalike bodyguard, Marjorie. In the season 6 finale, she gives birth to son Richard, conceived by artificial insemination, with Richard Splett as the donor. Catherine and Marjorie later marry in season 7, with Selina using their wedding in Norway as a diversion to escape Interpol and return to the United States, much to Catherine's chagrin. She ends her relationship with her mother permanently after Selina promises to end same-sex marriage in order to win the presidency, in which she ultimately is successful. Years later, Catherine does not attend her mother's funeral, instead watching it on television with Marjorie and the now-adult Richard. (season 7; recurring seasons 2–6; guest season 1)
- Clea DuVall as Marjorie Palmiotti: Selina's bodyguard and lookalike. She resigns when she begins a relationship with Catherine. In the season 6 premiere, her relationship with Catherine has progressed rapidly, and they later marry in season 7. After Selina leaves office as president, Marjorie is hired to serve as director of the Meyer Fund. (season 7; recurring seasons 5–6)

== Episodes ==
Season	Episodes	Originally released	
Season	Episodes	First released	Last released
1	8	April 22, 2012	June 10, 2012
2	10	April 14, 2013	June 23, 2013
3	10	April 6, 2014	June 8, 2014
4	10	April 12, 2015	June 14, 2015
5	10	April 24, 2016	June 26, 2016
6	10	April 16, 2017	June 25, 2017
7	7	March 31, 2019	May 12, 2019

== Development ==
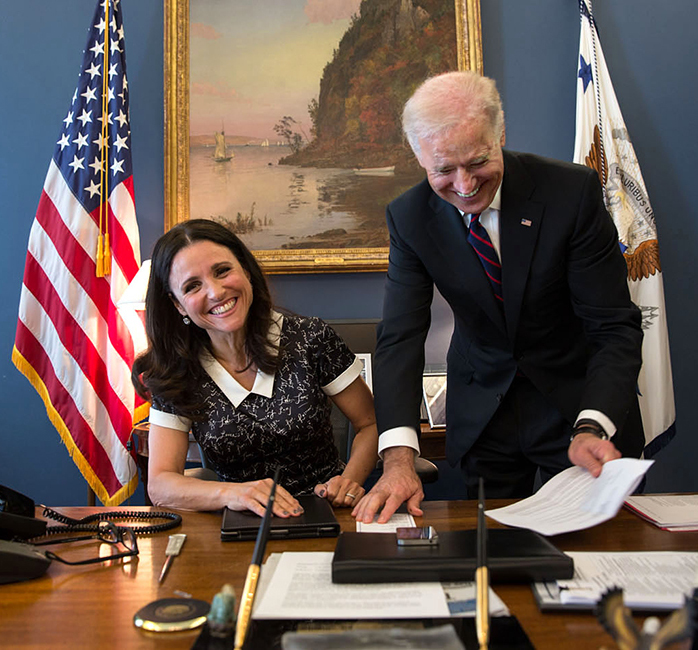
Louis-Dreyfus with then-Vice President Joe Biden at the White House

=== The Thick of It ===
==== BBC series ====
Before creating Veep, Scottish satirist Armando Iannucci created the BBC satire comedy The Thick of It, set in a fictional department of the British government. The Thick of It was first broadcast in 2005 and won a number of awards. Iannucci directed a spin-off film, In the Loop, which was released in 2009 and nominated for the Academy Award for Best Adapted Screenplay.

==== ABC pilot ====
A pilot for an American version of The Thick of It was produced as a candidate for the 2007–08 season on ABC. Also titled The Thick of It, it was developed for American audiences by writers Mitch Hurwitz and Richard Day and followed a low-level member of the United States Congress and his staff. Iannucci had a production credit on the show, but he was not otherwise involved. The pilot was produced by Sony Pictures Television and BBC Worldwide and directed by Christopher Guest.

In the pilot, John Michael Higgins played newly-elected Congressman Albert Alger, and Oliver Platt played committee chairman Malcolm Tucker. Rhea Seehorn portrayed Ollie Tadzio, an ambitious young speechwriter, and Michael McKean played Glen Glahm, "a former campaign operative who's now the Chief of Staff" for the congressman. Seehorn and McKean would later appear in the seventh season of Veep.

ABC did not pick up the show for its fall 2007 schedule. Iannucci distanced himself from the pilot, stating, "It was terrible...they took the idea and chucked out all the style. It was all conventionally shot and there was no improvisation or swearing. It didn't get picked up, thank God."

=== HBO development of Veep ===
After The Thick of It was dropped by ABC, several networks including HBO, Showtime and NBC expressed interest in adapting the show. Iannucci re-entered talks with HBO (his initial preference) about adapting the series, with the result that a new pilot episode for a series situated in the office of the Vice President of the United States called Veep (a nickname derived from the position's initials "VP") was commissioned in late 2009. Iannucci was given much more creative control over the production, and co-wrote the pilot with British comedy writer Simon Blackwell, who also contributed to the British series The Thick of It.

In April 2011, HBO announced that it had ordered Veep as a series, and later announced in January 2012 that the series would premiere on April 22, 2012.

Several of the American actors who appeared in In the Loop became regulars in Veep playing similar but not identical characters to their roles in the film, among them Anna Chlumsky, Zach Woods, and Mimi Kennedy.

== Production ==
Directors for Season 1 included Armando Iannucci, Tristram Shapeero and Chris Morris. Veep is executive produced by Iannucci, Christopher Godsick and Frank Rich. Co-executive producers are Simon Blackwell, Tony Roche, with Julia Louis-Dreyfus and Stephanie Laing as producers. The series' first four seasons featured an entirely British writing staff, including Iannucci, Blackwell, Roche, Sean Gray, Will Smith, Roger Drew, Ian Martin, Andy Riley, Kevin Cecil, David Quantick, Georgia Pritchett and Jesse Armstrong, among others, many of whom had previously worked with Iannucci on The Thick of It.

Series creator Armando Iannucci departed as showrunner following the fourth season's end of production. Iannucci stated that his continuing busy schedule, as well as the challenge of maintaining his family life while switching between Baltimore and London, would not allow him to "[dedicate] one hundred percent" as head of the show, and he had chosen to "fire" himself as a result. David Mandel took over as showrunner for future episodes, becoming Veep's first American writer. Mandel retained a small number of Iannucci's writing staff, as well as Chris Addison as director and supervising producer, whilst also bringing in his own staff, and American writers.

=== Filming ===
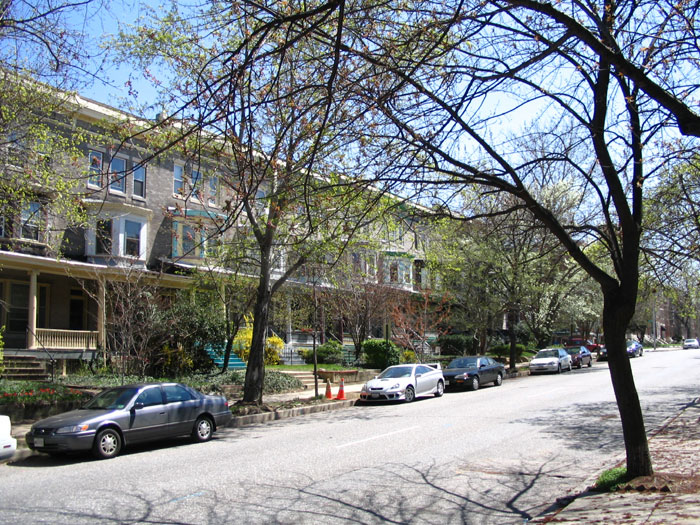
Charles Village, Baltimore, one of the areas where Veep filmed for its first season production

The pilot episode was filmed in February 2011 in Maryland, and filming for the series began in October 2011 in Baltimore, after several months of rehearsal designed to get the actors comfortable improvising with one another. For its first season, Veep reportedly hired 978 local Maryland residents, generating $40 million for the state, according to the Maryland Film Office. Season 2 production began shooting in November 2012, continuing to film in Baltimore and other areas of Maryland. Veep primarily filmed on a sound stage constructed from a Columbia, Maryland industrial warehouse, where replicas of places such as the Eisenhower Executive Office Building and West Wing were also built. The show continued filming in Maryland for its third and fourth seasons, as a bill was approved by state lawmakers in April 2013 that increased tax credits for film and TV productions in the state. Later filming locations included Annapolis and the Physical Sciences Complex in the University of Maryland, College Park campus.

Principal photography moved from Baltimore to Los Angeles in the show's fifth season after being one of a few series to be awarded tax incentives from the California Film Commission, as part of an expanded $330 million California Film Tax Credit program signed by Governor Jerry Brown in 2014. Filming took place for part of the show's fifth season in Washington, D.C., from February 25, 2016, to March 3, 2016. As a result of HBO's Community Impact program, a select number of local D.C. residents also worked on the production during the eight-day film shoot in the area. Areas in D.C. where production was reportedly found filming include the Superior Court, the Spring Valley neighborhood (where Julia Louis-Dreyfus once lived), and Dupont Circle's Kramerbooks independent bookstore. The seventh and final season wrapped filming in December 2018.

== Reception ==
Metacritic ratings per season
View chart definition.

Season	1	2	3	4	5	6	7
Rating	72	75	86	90	88	88	87

=== Season 1 ===
The first season of Veep received generally positive reviews from television critics. Review aggregator site Metacritic gave the season a score of 72 out of 100 based on reviews from 30 critics. The review aggregator website Rotten Tomatoes reported a 78% approval rating with an average rating of 7.2/10 based on 46 reviews. The site's consensus reads, "The jokes are funny and Julia Louis-Dreyfus is great in the lead, but Veep is still working to find its voice." Hank Stuever of The Washington Post praised the series, writing, "Thanks to Louis-Dreyfus, and the show's remarkable knack for dialogue and timing, Veep is instantly engaging and outrageously fun." Rob Brunner of Entertainment Weekly gave the season a positive review: "Charmingly goofy as ever, Louis-Dreyfus isn't quite believable as a Vice President – even a sitcom VP whose lack of gravitas is the show's central joke. But she's still a joy to watch, especially when she shows off that famous gift for physical comedy." Maureen Ryan of The Huffington Post gave the show a lukewarm review, writing, "Despite the clear talents of the assembled cast, Veep merely reinforces what most people already think and revisits territory many other politically oriented movies and TV shows have thoroughly covered." Brian Lowry of Variety gave the show a negative review and said a "show about an always-second office becomes second-tier TV."

=== Season 2 ===
The second season received acclaim from critics. It averaged a Metacritic score of 75 out of 100 based on reviews from 10 critics. On Rotten Tomatoes, it received a 92% approval rating with an average score of 8.6/10 based on 24 reviews. The site's consensus reads, "In Veep's second season, the satire is sharper, the insights are deeper, the tone is more consistent, and the result is a comedy of unexpected heft." David Hiltbrand of The Philadelphia Inquirer praised the series saying, "HBO's Veep is the sharpest Beltway satire the medium has ever seen, mostly because it focuses not on the power wielded by politicians, but on their desperate venality". Bruce Miller of Sioux City Journal also praised the show, writing: "The show is smart—smarter than most on network television—and it has life."

=== Season 3 ===
The third season received acclaim from critics. It received a Metacritic score of 86 out of 100 based on 10 reviews. It scored a 100% approval rating on Rotten Tomatoes, with an average rating of 8.6/10 based on 26 reviews. The site's consensus reads, "Veep continues its winning streak with a mix of smart comedy, bright performances and a refreshing approach to D.C. politics." Matt Roush of TV Guide praised the show, and in a joint review of Veep and Silicon Valley wrote: "[Silicon Valley is] paired with the third season of the savagely hilarious Veep; this combo promises to be HBO's most robust and certainly most entertaining comedy hour in years." Brandon Nowalk of The A.V. Club wrote the show "has become the clearest heir to 30 Rock and Arrested Development, and specific bits throughout the season recall both series." Tim Molloy of TheWrap praised the cast saying, "The show works because all of its actors seem so human, so likable, despite the words coming from their mouths."

=== Season 4 ===
The fourth season received acclaim from critics. It received a Metacritic score of 90 out of 100 based on 11 reviews. As with the previous season, Veep scored a 100% rating on Rotten Tomatoes, based on 25 reviews, with an average rating of 9.1/10. The site's consensus reads, "Veep shows no signs of slowing down in its fourth season, thanks to sharp, funny, rapid-fire dialogue between POTUS and her hilariously incompetent staff." Tim Goodman of The Hollywood Reporter wrote, "Veep enters its fourth season, firmly established as one of television's best comedies, and then immediately does what seems impossible—it delivers its most thoroughly assured, hilarious and brilliantly written and acted episodes." Ben Travers of Indiewire wrote, "Veep is incomparable in comedy" and that "the HBO comedy has crafted a style so unique the series itself is entirely its own beast."

=== Season 5 ===
The fifth season received acclaim from critics. It received a Metacritic score of 88 out of 100 based on 18 reviews. The season scored a 94% rating on Rotten Tomatoes, based on 36 reviews, with an average rating of 8.7/10. The site's consensus reads, "Thanks to the spot-on comedic prowess of Julia Louis-Dreyfus and company Veep is back with as many laughs and expletive-filled absurdities as ever." Tim Goodman of The Hollywood Reporter wrote that "Veep doesn't just feel like it's firing on all cylinders, it feels invigorated and out to prove something." while Kevin Sullivan of Entertainment Weekly wrote that "in the switch to new showrunner David Mandel, the state of Veep is strong".

=== Season 6 ===
The sixth season received critical acclaim. On Metacritic, it has a score of 88 out of 100 based on 15 reviews, indicating "universal acclaim". It has a 94% rating on Rotten Tomatoes based on 36 reviews with an average score of 8.2/10. The site's critical consensus reads, "A move from the White House hasn't dulled Veep's razor-sharp satirical edge, thanks to Julia Louis-Dreyfus and her castmates' deft comic chemistry."

=== Season 7 ===
The seventh season received critical acclaim. On Metacritic, it has a score of 87 out of 100 based on 21 reviews, indicating "universal acclaim". It has a 97% rating on Rotten Tomatoes based on 59 reviews with an average score of 8.9/10. The site's critical consensus reads, "Brash and bonkers as ever, Veep bows out with an unapologetically absurd final season that solidifies its status as one of TV's greatest comedies."

== Awards and honors ==
Through its seven seasons, Veep has received critical acclaim and won several major awards, including seventeen Primetime Emmy Awards, two Critics' Choice Television Awards, a Peabody Award, four Screen Actors Guild Awards, two Television Critics Association Awards, three Directors Guild of America Awards and three Writers Guild of America Awards.

Louis-Dreyfus's performance won her six consecutive Primetime Emmy Awards, three Screen Actors Guild Awards, two Critics' Choice Television Awards, a Television Critics Association Award, and five consecutive Golden Globe nominations. For his portrayal of Selina's personal aide, Gary, Tony Hale received six consecutive Emmy nominations for Outstanding Supporting Actor in a Comedy Series, winning in 2013 and 2015. Other members of the cast who received Emmy nominations include Anna Chlumsky (six nominations), Gary Cole (one nomination), Matt Walsh (two nominations), Martin Mull (one nomination), Hugh Laurie (one nomination), and Peter MacNicol (one nomination).

In 2019, Veep was ranked 80th on The Guardian's list of the 100 greatest TV shows of the 21st century. In 2021, the BBC placed it 24th on its list of the best series of the century. In 2022, the series was ranked 13th on Rolling Stone's list of the 100 greatest TV shows. In 2023, Variety included it at 26th on its own list of the greatest TV series of all time.

== Home media ==
Season	Release dates					Bonus features
Season	Region 1	Region 2	Region 4	Region A	Region B	Bonus features
1	March 26, 2013	June 3, 2013	April 3, 2013	March 26, 2013	June 3, 2013	"The Making of Veep", "Veep: Misspoke", "Veep: Obesity", deleted scenes and outtakes, 12 audio commentaries with cast and crew
2	March 25, 2014	June 2, 2014	May 28, 2014	March 25, 2014	June 2, 2014	Deleted scenes, 4 audio commentaries with cast and crew
3	March 31, 2015	March 30, 2015	April 1, 2015	March 31, 2015	March 30, 2015	Deleted scenes, 4 audio commentaries with cast and crew, "Governor's Visit"
4	April 19, 2016	April 18, 2016	April 20, 2016	April 19, 2016	April 18, 2016	Deleted scenes
5	April 11, 2017	April 10, 2017	April 12, 2017	April 11, 2017	April 10, 2017	Deleted scenes; audio commentaries
6	September 12, 2017	September 11, 2017	September 13, 2017	September 12, 2017	September 11, 2017	7 audio commentaries
7	January 14, 2020	January 13, 2020	January 15, 2020	January 14, 2020	January 13, 2020	"Character Retrospectives", "Inside the Final Season", 8 audio commentaries

== Legacy ==
Veep has remained popular since it ended. It has also received attention due to the show's plot lines resembling the real-world progress of the 2024 Democratic Party presidential primaries and the withdrawal of Joe Biden from the 2024 United States presidential election, which made Vice President Kamala Harris the presumptive Democratic nominee.

== See also ==
- List of Primetime Emmy Awards received by HBO
