= Mole map (dermatology) =

In dermatology, a mole map is a medical record which records an image and the location of lesions and/or moles, or dark spots on the human body. Such a record is useful for diagnosis of cancer a priori or as a baseline which can be compared against later images to determine when there has been a visual change which may indicate cancer.
