= Annie Award for Outstanding Achievement for Writing in an Animated Television/Broadcast Production =

Annual television award

Annie Award for Writing in an Animated Television/Broadcasting Production
- Awarded for: Excellence in writing
- Country: United States
- Presented by: ASIFA-Hollywood
- First award: 1994
- Currently held by: Joe Bennett and Steve Hely – Common Side Effects (2025)
- Website: annieawards.org

The Annie Award for Writing in a Television/Broadcasting Production is an Annie Award given annually to the best writing in animated television or broadcasting productions. From 1995 to 1996, both films and television productions were included in the Best Individual Achievement for Writing in the Field of Animation award. A separate category for writing in animated television/broadcasting productions was created at the 26th Annie Awards.

== Winners and nominees ==
=== 1990s ===
Best Individual Achievement for Story Contribution in the Field of Animation

Year	Film	Writer(s)	Network/Company
1994 (22nd)
1994 (22nd)	The Lion King	Brenda Chapman (Head of Story)	Walt Disney Pictures
1994 (22nd)	Batman: The Animated Series	Paul Dini (Writer/Story Editor)	Fox Kids
1994 (22nd)	A Flintstone Family Christmas	David Feiss (Story Artist)	ABC
1994 (22nd)	Mighty Max	Gary Graham (Story Artist)	Syndication
1994 (22nd)	Hollyrock-a-Bye Baby	Iwao Takamoto (Story Artist)	ABC

Best Individual Achievement for Writing in the Field of Animation

Year	Program	Episode(s)	Writer(s)	Network/Company
1995 (23rd)
1995 (23rd)	The Tick	"The Tick vs. Arthur's Bank Account"	Ben Edlund, Richard Liebmann-Smith	Fox
1995 (23rd)	Rugrats	"A Rugrats Passover"	Peter Gaffney, Paul Germain, Jon Greenberg, Rachael Lipman	Nickelodeon
1995 (23rd)	Aladdin	"Do the Rat Thing"	Doug Langdale	Syndication/CBS
1995 (23rd)	Spider-Man	"Day of the Chameleon"	John Semper	Fox
1995 (23rd)	Gargoyles	"Deadly Force"	Michael Reaves	Syndication
1996 (24th)
1996 (24th)	Toy Story		Andrew Stanton, Joss Whedon, Joel Cohen and Alec Sokolow	Walt Disney Pictures
1996 (24th)	Gargoyles	"Avalon"	Lydia Marano	Syndication
1996 (24th)	Ghost in the Shell		Kazunori Itō	Shochiku
1996 (24th)	The Hunchback of Notre Dame		Tab Murphy, Irene Mecchi, Bob Tzudiker, Noni White, Jonathan Roberts	Walt Disney Pictures
1996 (24th)	James and the Giant Peach		Karey Kirkpatrick, Jonathan Roberts, Steve Bloom	Walt Disney Pictures

Outstanding Achievement for Writing in a Television Production

Year	Program	Episode(s)	Writer(s)	Network
1997 (25th)
1997 (25th)	Dexter's Laboratory	"Beard to be Feared"	Jason Butler Rote, Paul Rudish	Cartoon Network
1997 (25th)	Adventures from the Book of Virtues	"Loyality"	Mark Young	PBS
1997 (25th)	King of the Hill	"Shins of the Father"	Alan R. Cohen, Alan Freedland	Fox
1997 (25th)	King of the Hill	"Luanne's Saga"	Paul Lieberstein	Fox
1997 (25th)	Edith Ann's Christmas: Just Say Noel		Jane Wagner	ABC
1998 (26th)
1998 (26th)	Pinky and the Brain	"The Family That Poits Together, Narfs Together"	Charles M. Howell IV, Earl Kress, John Ludin	Kids' WB
1998 (26th)	101 Dalmatians: The Series	"Swine Song"	Cydne Clark, Steve Granat	ABC
1998 (26th)	Genie's Great Minds		Mark McCorkle, Robert Schooley	ABC
1998 (26th)	CatDog	"Dog Gone"	Derek Drymon, Robert Porter, Peter Hannan	Nickelodeon
1998 (26th)	Johnny Bravo	"The Perfect Gift"	Steve Marmel	Cartoon Network
1999 (27th)
1999 (27th)	The Simpsons	"Simpsons Bible Stories"	Tim Long, Larry Doyle, Matt Selman	Fox
1999 (27th)	Batman Beyond	"Rebirth Part I"	Alan Burnett, Paul Dini	Kids' WB
1999 (27th)	King of the Hill	"Hank's Cowboy Movie"	Jim Dauterive	Fox
1999 (27th)	Futurama	"The Series Has Landed"	Ken Keeler	Fox
1999 (27th)	Space Ghost Coast to Coast	"Lawsuit"	Evan Dorkin, Sarah Dyer	Cartoon Network

=== 2000s ===
Year	Program	Episode(s)	Writer(s)	Network
2000 (28th)
2000 (28th)	Olive, the Other Reindeer		Steve Young	Fox
2000 (28th)	Batman Beyond	"Zeta"	Robert Goodman	Kids' WB
2000 (28th)	King of the Hill	"Aisle 8A"	Garland Testa	Fox
2000 (28th)	The Powerpuff Girls	"Dream Scheme"	Chris Savino	Cartoon Network
2001 (29th)
2001 (29th)	Futurama	"The Luck of the Fryrish"	Ron Weiner	Fox
2001 (29th)	Batman Beyond	"Out of the Past"	Paul Dini	Kids' WB
2001 (29th)	The Simpsons	"HOMЯ"	Al Jean	Fox
2001 (29th)	King of the Hill	"Chasing Bobby"	Garland Testa	Fox
2001 (29th)	Captain Sturdy	"Back in Action"	William Waldner	Adult Swim
2002 (30th)
2002 (30th)	King of the Hill	"Bobby Goes Nuts"	Norm Hiscock	Fox
2002 (30th)	The Proud Family	"I Had a Dream"	James E. West, T. Smith III	Disney Channel
2002 (30th)	King of the Hill	"Man Without a Country Club"	Kit Boss	Fox
2003 (31st)
2003 (31st)	The Simpsons	"Three Gays of the Condo"	Matt Warburton	Fox
2003 (31st)	Justice League	"Comfort & Joy"	Paul Dini	Cartoon Network
2003 (31st)	King of the Hill	"Reborn to be Wild"	Tony Gama-Lobo, Rebecca May	Fox
2003 (31st)	Futurama	"The Sting"	Patric M. Verrone	Fox
2003 (31st)	Captain Sturdy	"The Originals"	William Waldner	Adult Swim
2004 (32nd)
2004 (32nd)	King of the Hill	"Ceci N'est Pas Une King of the Hill"	Etan Cohen	Fox
2004 (32nd)	Foster's Home for Imaginary Friends	"World Wide Wabbit"	Lauren Faust	Cartoon Network
2004 (32nd)	Dave the Barbarian	"Ned Frischman: Man of Tomorrow"	Evan Gore, Heather Lombard	Disney Channel
2004 (32nd)	Brandy & Mr. Whiskers	"Cyranosaurus Rex"	Brandon Sawyer	Disney Channel
2004 (32nd)	The Fairly OddParents	"Channel Chasers"	Butch Hartman, Steve Marmel	Nickelodeon
2005 (33rd)
2005 (33rd)	SpongeBob SquarePants	"Fear of a Krabby Patty"	C. H. Greenblatt, Paul Tibbitt, Mike Bell, Tim Hill	Nickelodeon
2005 (33rd)	Avatar: The Last Airbender	"The Fortune Teller"	Aaron Ehasz, John O'Bryan	Nickelodeon
2005 (33rd)	The Adventures of Jimmy Neutron, Boy Genius	"The Tomorrow Boys"	Christopher Painter	Nickelodeon
2005 (33rd)	O'Grady	"Old Cold"	Johanna Stein, Jack Ferraiolo	Noggin
2005 (33rd)	Jakers! The Adventures of Piggley Winks	"Wish Upon a Story Part 1"	Larry Swerdlove	PBS Kids
2006 (34th)
2006 (34th)	The Simpsons	"The Seemingly Never-Ending Story"	Ian Maxtone-Graham	Fox
2006 (34th)	My Gym Partner's a Monkey	"Nice Moustache"	Tom Sheppard	Cartoon Network
2006 (34th)	Family Guy	"Barely Legal"	Kirker Butler	Fox
2006 (34th)	Family Guy	"The Griffin Family History"	John Viener	Fox
2006 (34th)	American Dad!	"The American Dad After School Special"	Dan Vebber	Fox
2007 (35th)
2007 (35th)	The Simpsons	"24 Minutes"	Ian Maxtone-Graham, Billy Kimball	Fox
2007 (35th)	Chowder	"Burple Nurples"	C.H. Greenblatt, William Reiss	Cartoon Network
2007 (35th)	Squirrel Boy	"I Only Have Eye for You"	Christopher Painter	Cartoon Network
2007 (35th)	My Gym Partner's a Monkey	"The Butt of the Jake"	Tom Sheppard	Cartoon Network
2007 (35th)	Back at the Barnyard	"Cowman and Ratboy"	Gene Grillo	Nickelodeon
2008 (36th)
2008 (36th)	Robot Chicken: Star Wars Episode II		Tom Root, Douglas Goldstein, Hugh Davidson, Mike Fasolo, Seth Green, Dan Milano, Matthew Senreich, Kevin Shinick, Zeb Wells, Breckin Meyer	Adult Swim
2008 (36th)	The Simpsons	"The Debarted"	Joel H. Cohen	Fox
2008 (36th)	El Tigre: The Adventures of Manny Rivera	"Mustache Love"	Scott Kreamer	Nickelodeon
2008 (36th)	Secrets of the Furious Five		Paul McEvoy, Todd Berger	NBC
2008 (36th)	Glago's Guest		Chris Williams	Walt Disney Animation Studios
2009 (37th)
2009 (37th)	The Simpsons	"Treehouse of Horror XX"	Daniel Chun	Fox
2009 (37th)	Prep & Landing		Kevin Peters, Stevie Wermers-Skelton	ABC
2009 (37th)	The Simpsons	"Four Great Women and a Manicure"	Valentina L. Garza	Fox
2009 (37th)	The Simpsons	"Gone Maggie Gone"	Billy Kimball, Ian Maxtone-Graham	Fox
2009 (37th)	Wonder Pets!	"Save the Honey Bears"	Billy Lopez	Nickelodeon

=== 2010s ===
Year	Program	Episode(s)	Writer(s)	Network
2010 (38th)
2010 (38th)	Robot Chicken: Star Wars Episode III		Geoff Johns, Matthew Beans, Zeb Wells, Hugh Sterbakov, Matthew Senreich, Breckin Meyer, Seth Green, Mike Fasolo, Douglas Goldstein, Tom Root, Dan Milano, Kevin Shinick, Hugh Davidson	Adult Swim
2010 (38th)	The Simpsons	"Stealing First Base"	John Frink	Fox
2010 (38th)	Futurama		Michael Rowe	Comedy Central
2010 (38th)	Star Wars: The Clone Wars	"Heroes on Both Sides"	Daniel Arkin	Cartoon Network
2010 (38th)	Phineas and Ferb	"Nerds of a Feather"	Jon Colton Barry, Piero Piluso	Disney Channel
2011 (39th)
2011 (39th)	The Simpsons	"Treehouse of Horror XXII"	Carolyn Omine	Fox
2011 (39th)	Fish Hooks	"Fish School Musical"	Blake Lemons, William Reiss, C.H. Greenblatt, Derek Evanick, Diana Lafayatis, Neil Graf	Disney Channel
2011 (39th)	SpongeBob SquarePants	"Patrick's Staycation"	Dani Michaeli, Sean Charmatz, Nate Cash, Luke Brookshier, Paul Tibbitt	Nickelodeon
2011 (39th)	T.U.F.F. Puppy	"Thunder Dog"	Kevin Sullivan, Will Schifrin, Ray Delaurentis	Nickelodeon
2011 (39th)	The Fairly OddParents	"Invasion of the Dads"	Kevin Sullivan, Will Schifrin, Ray Delaurentis	Nickelodeon
2011 (39th)	Futurama	"All the Presidents' Heads"	Josh Weinstein	Comedy Central
2011 (39th)	Aqua Unit Patrol Squad 1	"The Creditor"	Matt Maiellaro, Dave Willis	Adult Swim
2011 (39th)	Prep & Landing: Naughty vs. Nice		Stevie Wermers-Skelton, Kevin Deters	ABC
2012 (40th)
2012 (40th)	South Park	"Jewpacabra"	Trey Parker	Comedy Central
2012 (40th)	Kung Fu Panda: Legends of Awesomeness	"Kung Fu Day Care"	Doug Langdale	Nickelodeon
2012 (40th)	The Penguins of Madagascar	"Endangerous Species"	Gabe Garza	Nickelodeon
2012 (40th)	Robot and Monster	"The Blimp"	Kacey Arnold	Nickelodeon
2012 (40th)	Futurama	"The Bots and the Bees"	Eric Horsted	Comedy Central
2012 (40th)	The Simpsons	"How I Wet Your Mother"	Ian Maxtone-Graham, Billy Kimball	Fox
2012 (40th)	The Simpsons	"A Tree Grows in Springfield"	Stephanie Gillis	Fox
2012 (40th)	Dragons: Riders of Berk	"Animal House"	Mike Teverbaugh, Linda Teverbaugh	Cartoon Network
2013 (41st)
2013 (41st)	Futurama		Lewis Morton	Comedy Central
2013 (41st)	Kung Fu Panda: Legends of Awesomeness		Katie Matila	Nickelodeon
2013 (41st)	Regular Show		Matt Price, John Infantino, Mike Roth, Michele Cavin, Sean Szeles	Cartoon Network
2013 (41st)	The Simpsons	"Dangers on a Train"	Michael Price	Fox
2013 (41st)	The Simpsons	"Dark Knight Court"	Billy Kimball, Ian Maxtone-Graham	Fox
2014 (42nd)
2014 (42nd)	Mickey Mouse		Darrick Bachman	Disney Channel
2014 (42nd)	The Powerpuff Girls		Dave Tennant, David P. Smith, Chris Mitchell, Will Mata	Cartoon Network
2014 (42nd)	The Simpsons	"Married to the Blob"	Tim Long	Fox
2014 (42nd)	The Simpsons	"The War of Art"	Rob LaZebnik	Fox
2014 (42nd)	Toy Story That Time Forgot		Steve Purcell	ABC
2015 (43rd)
2015 (43rd)	Bob's Burgers	"The Hauntening"	Steven Davis, Kelvin Yu	Fox
2015 (43rd)	Adventure Time	"The Diary"	Kent Osborne, Pendleton Ward, Jack Pendarvis, Jillian Tamaki, Adam Muto	Cartoon Network
2015 (43rd)	The Simpsons	"I Won't Be Home for Christmas"	Al Jean	Fox
2015 (43rd)	Gravity Falls	"Not What He Seems"	Alex Hirsch, Shion Takeuchi, Josh Weinstein, Jeff Rowe, Matt Chapman	Disney XD
2016 (44th)
2016 (44th)	Bob's Burgers	"The Hormone-iums"	Lizzie Molyneux, Wendy Molyneux	Fox
2016 (44th)	Gravity Falls	"Weirdmageddon 3: Take Back The Falls"	Shion Takeuchi, Mark Rizzo, Jeff Rowe, Josh Weinstein, Alex Hirsch	Disney XD
2016 (44th)	Puffin Rock	"The First Snow"	Davey Moore	RTÉjr/Netflix
2016 (44th)	The Simpsons	"Barthood"	Dan Greaney	Fox
2016 (44th)	The Simpsons	"The Burns Cage"	Rob LaZebnik	Fox
2017 (45th)
2017 (45th)	Rick and Morty	"The Ricklantis Mixup"	Ryan Ridley, Dan Guterman	Adult Swim
2017 (45th)	Archer	"Jane Doe"	Adam Reed	FX
2017 (45th)	Trollhunters: Tales of Arcadia	"Escape from the Darklands"	A. C. Bradley, Kevin Hageman, Dan Hageman, Aaron Waltke, Chad Quandt	Netflix
2017 (45th)	Mickey Mouse	"Locked in Love"	Darrick Bachman	Disney Channel
2017 (45th)	Milo Murphy's Law	"The Island of the Lost Dakotas"	Joshua Pruett	Disney XD
2018 (46th)
2018 (46th)	Hilda	"The Tide Mice"	Stephanie Simpson	Netflix
2018 (46th)	Star vs. the Forces of Evil	"Booth Buddies"	Dominic Bisignano, Aaron Hammersley, Amy Higgins, John Infantino, Daron Nefcy	Disney XD
2018 (46th)	Big Mouth	"The Planned Parenthood Show"	Emily Altman	Netflix
2018 (46th)	Craig of the Creek	"Escape from Family Dinner"	Matt Burnett, Ben Levin, Shauna McGarry, Jeff Trammell, Tiffany Ford	Cartoon Network
2018 (46th)	We Bare Bears	"101-Hurricane Hal"	Mikey Heller, Sang Yup Lee, Louie Zong	Cartoon Network
2019 (47th)
2019 (47th)	Tuca & Bertie	"The Jelly Lakes"	Shauna McGarry	Netflix
2019 (47th)	Apple & Onion	"Apple's Short"	George Gendi, Michael Gendi, Deepak Sethi, Eric Acosta, Sean Szeles	Cartoon Network
2019 (47th)	BoJack Horseman	"Feel-Good Story"	Alison Tafel	Netflix
2019 (47th)	Pinky Malinky	"Secret"	Sheela Shrinivas, Aminder Dhaliwal, Rikke Asbjoern	Nickelodeon
2019 (47th)	Xavier Riddle and the Secret Museum	"I Am Helen Keller"	Meghan Read	PBS Kids

=== 2020s ===
Year	Program	Episode(s)	Writer(s)	Network
2020 (48th)
2020 (48th)	Big Mouth	"The New Me"	Andrew Goldberg, Patti Harrison	Netflix
2020 (48th)	Craig of the Creek		Jeff Trammell, Tiffany Ford, Dashawn Mahone, Najja Porter	Cartoon Network
2020 (48th)	Fancy Nancy	"Nancy’s New Friend"	Krista Tucker, Andy Guerdat, Matt Hoverman, Laurie Israel, Marisa Evans-Sanden	Disney Junior
2020 (48th)	Harley Quinn	"Something Borrowed, Something Green"	Sarah Peters	DC Universe
2020 (48th)	She-Ra and the Princesses of Power	"Heart Part 2"	ND Stevenson	Netflix
2021 (49th)
2021 (49th)	Arcane	"The Monster You Created"	Christian Linke, Alex Yee	Netflix
2021 (49th)	Maya and the Three	"Chapter 4: The Skull"	Silvia Olivas, Jorge R. Guitterez	Netflix
2021 (49th)	Muppet Babies	"Gonzo-Rella"	Ghia Godfree	Disney Junior
2021 (49th)	The Mighty Ones	"Berry's Pet Threat"	Jillian Goldfluss, Erica Jones, Nicolette Wood	Hulu/Peacock
2021 (49th)	Tuca & Bertie	"Planteau"	Lisa Hanawalt	Adult Swim
2022 (50th)
2022 (50th)	Love Death + Robots	"Bad Traveling"	Andrew Kevin Walker	Netflix
2022 (50th)	Baymax!	"Sofia"	Cirocco Dunlap	Disney+
2022 (50th)	Big Nate	"The Legend of the Gunting"	Mitch Watson, Emily Brundige, Ben Lapides, Sarah Allan	Paramount+
2022 (50th)	The House		Enda Walsh	Netflix
2022 (50th)	Tuca & Bertie	"The Pain Garden"	Lisa Hanawalt	Adult Swim
2023 (51st)
2023 (51st)	Blue Eye Samurai	"The Tale of the Ronin and the Bride"	Amber Noizumi	Netflix
2023 (51st)	Only You: An Animated Shorts Collection	"Yellowbird"	Tsvetelina Zdraveva and Jerred North	Max
2023 (51st)	Rock Paper Scissors	"Birthday Police"	Josh Lehrman, Kyle Stegina, Aram Spencer Porter, Julia Prescott and Mike Trapp	Nickelodeon
2023 (51st)	Rosie's Rules	"Time Trouble"	Leyani Diaz and Maria Escobedo	PBS Kids
2023 (51st)	Scavengers Reign	"The Reunion"	Sean Buckelew	Max
2024 (52nd)
2024 (52nd)	Orion and the Dark		Charlie Kaufman	Netflix
2024 (52nd)	Craig of the Creek	"Whose Dimension Is It Anyway?"	Harron Atkins, Lorraine DeGraffenreidt, Pearl Low, and Richie Pope	Cartoon Network
2024 (52nd)	Jessica's Big Little World	"Jessica's Picnic"	Austin Faber, Gabriel Franklin, Shawneé Gibbs, Shawnelle Gibbs, and Ashleigh Hairston	Cartoon Network
2024 (52nd)	The Simpsons	"Bart's Birthday"	Jessica Conrad	Fox
2024 (52nd)	Yuck!		Loïc Espuche	Ikki Films; Iliade et Films
2025 (53rd)
2025 (53rd)	Common Side Effects	"Pilot"	Joe Bennett and Steve Hely	Adult Swim
2025 (53rd)	#1 Happy Family USA	"Nine Ten"	Ramy Youssef and Pam Brady	Amazon Prime Video
2025 (53rd)	Adult Swim's The Elephant		Pendleton Ward, Ian Jones-Quartey, Rebecca Sugar, and Patrick McHale	Adult Swim
2025 (53rd)	Lulu is a Rhinoceros		Allison Flom	Apple TV
2025 (53rd)	Win or Lose	"Pickle"	Carrie Hobson and Michael Yates	Disney+

== See also ==
- Writers Guild of America Award for Television: Animation
