= Independent Spirit Award for Best New Scripted Series =

Annual US film award

- Awarded for: Best New Scripted Series
- Country: United States
- Presented by: Film Independent
- First award: 2020
- Currently held by: Adolescence (2025)
- Website: filmindependent.org

The Independent Spirit Award for New Scripted Series (or Best New Series) is one of the annual Independent Spirit Awards, presented to recognize the best in independent filmmaking.

== History ==
It was first awarded in 2020 with Michaela Coel's miniseries I May Destroy You being the first recipient of the award.

== Criteria ==
Only first season series are eligible to compete, international series can compete as long as at least three episode aired on a US broadcaster within the calendar year.

== Recipients ==
=== 2020s ===
Year	Winner	Network	Creator(s)
2020	I May Destroy You	BBC One	Michaela Coel
2020	Little America	Apple TV+	Lee Eisenberg, Emily V. Gordon and Kumail Nanjiani
2020	Small Axe	Prime Video	Steve McQueen
2020	A Teacher	FX	Hannah Fidell
2020	Unorthodox	Netflix	Anna Winger and Alexa Karolinski
2021	Reservation Dogs	FX	Sterlin Harjo & Taika Waititi
2021	Blindspotting	Starz	Rafael Casal & Daveed Diggs
2021	It's a Sin	Channel 4	Russell T. Davies
2021	The Underground Railroad	Prime Video	Barry Jenkins
2021	We Are Lady Parts	Channel 4	Nida Manzoor
2022	The Bear	FX on Hulu	Christopher Storer
2022	Pachinko	Apple TV+	Soo Hugh
2022	The Porter	BET+ / CBC Television	Arnold Pinnock & Bruce Ramsay
2022	Severance	Apple TV+	Dan Erickson
2022	Station Eleven	HBO Max	Patrick Somerville
2023	Beef	Netflix	Lee Sung Jin
2023	Dreaming Whilst Black	Showtime	Adjani Salmon
2023	I'm a Virgo	Prime Video	Boots Riley
2023	Jury Duty	Freevee	Lee Eisenberg and Gene Stupnitsky
2023	Slip	The Roku Channel	Zoe Lister-Jones
2024	Shōgun	FX	Rachel Kondo and Justin Marks
2024	Baby Reindeer	Netflix	Richard Gadd
2024	Diarra from Detroit	BET+	Diarra Kilpatrick
2024	English Teacher	FX	Brian Jordan Alvarez
2024	Fantasmas	HBO	Julio Torres
2025	Adolescence	Netflix	Jack Thorne and Stephen Graham
2025	Common Side Effects	Adult Swim	Joe Bennett and Steve Hely
2025	Forever	Netflix	Mara Brock Akil
2025	Mr Loverman	BBC One	Nathaniel Price
2025	North of North	CBC / APTN / Netflix	Stacey Aglok MacDonald, Alethea Arnaquq-Baril

== Networks with multiple wins ==
- FX – 3
- Netflix – 2
