= Joe Bennett (animator) =

American writer, director, and animator (born 1986)

- Born: February 4, 1986 (age 40); East Point, Georgia, U.S.
- Education: School of Visual Arts (BFA)
- Occupations: Writer; director; animator; entrepreneur
- Writing career
- Notable works: Scavengers Reign, Common Side Effects
- Notable awards: Emmy award for Scavengers Reign (2024)
- Website: josephbennett.tv

Joe Bennett (born February 4, 1986) is an American writer, director, animator, and entrepreneur. He is the co-creator of Adult Swim's Common Side Effects, and of the 2024 Emmy Award-winning Scavengers Reign. Bennett is the co-founder of Green Street Pictures. He illustrated A Bathroom Book for People Not Pooping or Peeing but Using the Bathroom as an Escape, written by Joe Pera and 2021's I Will Not Die Alone written by Dera White. In 2022, Bennett appeared on Variety's "10 Animators to Watch."

== Early life and education ==
Bennett was born in East Point, Georgia, and raised in Fairburn, Georgia, a suburb of Atlanta. He has one older sister, Dera White. Bennett went to School of Visual Arts in New York, majoring in fine arts, with a focus on painting, and graduated in 2008. While in his junior year, SVA opened a digital lab which Bennett became interested in, particularly the ability to tell stories through animation.

== Career ==
Once Bennett graduated from SVA, he worked in post-production houses and advertising agencies such as J. Walter Thompson and Leroy & Clarkson, while animating shorts in his free time. In 2014, his shorts Odin's Afterbirth 1, 2 & 3 and Bedtime Stories began appearing in episodes of MTV's Liquid Television reboot. That same year, Bennett created bumpers for Adult Swim, which he wrote, directed, and animated.

In 2019, the animated and live-action short film showcase series Cake on FX unveiled the "Joe Bennett Collection," which featured eighteen animated shorts directed and animated by Bennett. Some of the shorts include Jay, which starred Ted Travelstead and Claudia O'Doherty; Derecho, starring Kate Berlant, John Early, Ted Travelstead, and Felipe Di Poi; Birds starring Joe Pera; Yoo Wana Nowat lyee Didd starring Rory Scovel; and Radio starring Conner O'Malley.

ln 2020, Bennett created a short series called Iggy and Friends, which starred Martha Kelly and Caleb Hearon. Will Ferrell voiced episode 4. It was commissioned by AOK Originals.

=== Green Street Pictures ===
In 2020, Bennett co-founded Green Street Pictures with Sean Buckelew, James Merrill and Benjy Brooke.

Scavengers Reign, co-created by Bennett and Charles Huettner, took eight years to bring to fruition. It originally aired as an eight-minute short in 2016 on Adult Swim, called Scavengers, about several human survivors on a hostile alien world. By the time it went to series with a twelve episode order from MAX in 2023, its world-building expanded. Scavengers Reign is a co-production between Titmouse and Green Street Pictures and co-stars Sunita Mani, Wunmi Mosaku, Alia Shawkat, Bob Stephenson and Ted Travelstead. It won the 2024 Emmy for Outstanding Individual Achievement in Animation for "The Dream" episode and was nominated for Outstanding Animated Program.

In 2025, Joe Bennett and Steve Hely created the 2025 Emmy-nominated Common Side Effects, which aired on Adult Swim. It co-starred Dave King, Emily Pendergast, Martha Kelly, Joseph Lee Anderson and Mike Judge. It followed former high school lab mates Marshall and Frances as they unravelled a conspiracy involving big pharma and the government to suppress knowledge of a rare fungus secret that may have contained the solution to cure all world's diseases. Adult Swim renewed Common Side Effects for a second season in March 2025.

== Personal ==
Bennett lives in Los Angeles with his wife and daughter.

== Filmography ==
=== Shorts ===
YEAR	TITLE	VOICED BY	NOTES
2011	Music video for the band Animal	Animal	The music video is for the song, "Impossible Chicken."
2013	Spiral	Kate Berlant	A collaboration with Kate Berlant.
	Bliss	Kate Berlant, Joe Pera	
2014	Odin's Afterbirth	Cory Blische	3 episodes aired in Liquid Television.
	Bedtime Stories	Cory Blische	Aired in episode 1 of Liquid Television.
	Adult Swim Bumpers	Rory Scovel, Cory Blische	Produced by Titmouse.
2015	Cody's Positive Animations	Cory Blische, Brandon Blische	
	First Date	Aiyana Udesen, Matt Furie	First Date was a collab with Matt Furie.
2016	Scavengers		Written and produced by Joe Bennett and Charles Huettner, aired on Adult Swim.
2019	"Joe Bennett Collection"	Various voiceovers	A series of eighteen shorts that aired on FXX's Cake, now streaming on Hulu. Titles include: Slot, Balloons, Park, Ice Cream, Jay, Derecho, Drive Thru, Yoo Wana Nowat lyee Didd, Fishing, Therapy, Puppet.
	FX Bumpers	Joe Bennett	Written, directed and animated by Joe Bennett.
	Birds	Joe Pera	Commissioned by FX Productions.
2020	Iggy and Friends	Martha Kelly, Joe Bennett, Caleb Hearon, Will Ferrell	A series of shorts commissioned by AOK. Episode two is co-written with Martha Kelly.
2021	Mitch	Thomas Middleditch	A collaboration with Thomas Middleditch.
	Football	Martin Starr	A collaboration with Martin Starr.
2022	Bomb Squad	Emmy Blotnick	Co-written with Emmy Blotnick.

=== Television series ===
Year	Title	Credited as				Notes	Ref.
Year	Title	Creator	Director	Writer	Executive Producer	Notes	Ref.
2023	Scavengers Reign	Yes	Yes	Yes	Yes	co-created with Charles Huettner co-directed "The Signal" co-wrote "The Signal," "The Storm" and "The Wall"	
2025-present	Common Side Effects	Yes	No	Yes	Yes	co-created with Steve Hely co-wrote "Pilot"	
2025-present	Haha, You Clowns	No	No	No	Yes		
TBA	My Two Cars	No	No	No	Yes		
TBA	Dealies	Yes	No	Yes	Yes	co-created with Ted Travelstead	
