= Common Side Effects =

2025 American adult animated television series

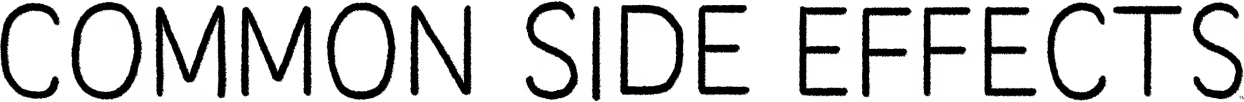
- Genre: Black comedy; Comedy drama; Conspiracy thriller
- Created by: Joe Bennett; Steve Hely
- Voices of: Dave King; Emily Pendergast; Mike Judge; Martha Kelly; Joseph Lee Anderson
- Composer: Nicolas Snyder
- Country of origin: United States
- Original language: English
- No. of seasons: 1
- No. of episodes: 10

Production
- Executive producers: Joe Bennett; Steve Hely; Mike Judge; Greg Daniels; Dustin Davis; Dave King; James Merrill; Sean Buckelew; Benjy Brooke; Kelly Crews; Suzanna Makkos
- Producers: Max Minor; Susan Shi; Paige Boudreaux; Jonathan Roig; Jacey Bradley
- Editor: Tony Christopherson
- Running time: 23 minutes
- Production companies: Green Street Pictures; Bandera Entertainment; Tell Me More; Williams Street

Original release
- Network: Adult Swim
- Release: February 2, 2025 – present

Common Side Effects is an American adult animated television series created by Joe Bennett and Steve Hely for Cartoon Network's nighttime programming block Adult Swim. It was produced by Bandera Entertainment, with key crew members of King of the Hill involved in production.

The pilot episode premiered privately at the Annecy International Animation Film Festival in June 2024 and publicly a month later at Adult Swim's San Diego Comic-Con panel. The series premiered on Adult Swim on February 2, 2025. The series has been renewed for a second season, which is set to premiere on January 24, 2027.

== Premise ==
Two high school friends, Marshall and Frances, reconnect after Marshall discovers the Blue Angel Mushroom, a mushroom with healing effects that appears to cure all illnesses and injuries. In the process, they also uncover a conspiracy involving Reutical Pharmaceuticals, Inc., one of the largest pharmaceutical companies, and the government, to suppress all knowledge of said mushroom.

== Characters ==
=== Main ===
- Marshall Cuso (voiced by Dave King) is the knowledgeable, cautious protagonist of the series and was friends with Frances in high school. He is an accomplished expert in fungi who has done charity work in foreign countries and is sly in run-ins with the DEA.
- Frances Applewhite (voiced by Emily Pendergast) is Rick's executive assistant and Marshall's high school lab mate and friend. Though initially hesitant about the effects of the Blue Angel, she eventually sees the monetary value in the mushrooms and is motivated to try and get them to Rick to take care of her mother, who was recently diagnosed with dementia.
- Rick Kruger (voiced by Mike Judge) is the incompetent chief executive officer of Reutical, who constantly bothers Frances to do mundane tasks for him, such as booking reservations and changing the TV channel. He also enjoys farming simulator video games, often playing in improper settings such as work and formal events.
- Agents Copano (voiced by Joseph Lee Anderson) and Harrington (voiced by Martha Kelly) are nonchalant best friends who work for the Drug Enforcement Administration.

=== Recurring ===
- Nick (voiced by Ben Feldman) is Frances' lackadaisical, often oblivious boyfriend who loves VR gaming. Feldman also provides additional voices.
- Jonas Backstein (voiced by Danny Huston) is a powerful Swiss financier and board member of Reutical with heavy insider ties to the federal government who is focused on destroying Marshall and the mushrooms.
- Cecily (voiced by Sydney Poitier) is a Deputy National Security Director with influence over the DEA who secretly conspires with Jonas and Reutical.
- Hildy (voiced by Sue Rose) is Marshall's idiosyncratic, mycologist mentor who seeks to possess the Blue Angel for her own ends.
- Sonia Applewhite (voiced by Lin Shaye) is Frances' mother who has been diagnosed with dementia, and is Frances' main motivation for acquiring the Blue Angel mushroom.
- Amelia (voiced by Shannon Woodward) is the laid-back mycologist hired by the DEA to gather information on the Blue Angel, also acting as a single mother and caretaker to her ill son, Wyatt. Woodward also provides additional voices.
- Kiki (voiced by Christine Ko) is a researcher at Reutical. Young and knowledgeable on medicine and the pharmaceutical system, she acts as the devil's advocate for the company, disputing the arguments brought up by people such as Marshall.
- Zane (voiced by Alan Resnick) is Marshall's self-trained herpetologist half-brother specializing in marine animals. He enjoys taking psychedelic drugs and illegally imports rare tropical animals.
- Jimmer Jarvis (voiced by Mike Judge) is the Sheriff of Averesboro, North Carolina who becomes Marshall's next-door neighbor and ally.
- Rusty (voiced by Steve Hely) is Jimmer’s redneck nephew who spends most of his time shooting guns or riding his BMX bike.

=== Additional & guest voices ===
- Shalita Grant as Female DEA Agent / Susan / Kelly
- Bob Stephenson as Connor / Samurai
- Timothy Simons as DEA Dispatcher / Lawyer / Test Subject 3
- Andy Daly as Mysterious Passenger / Christopher
- Nicolas Cantu as Tommy

== Episodes ==
No.	Title	Directed by	Written by	Original release date	US viewers (millions)
1	"Pilot"	Camille Bozec	Joe Bennett & Steve Hely	February 2, 2025	0.18
After angrily confronting CEO Rick Kruger at a Reutical Pharmaceutical event, Marshall Cuso reunites with high school friend Frances Applewhite. Unaware that she is Rick's assistant, Marshall tells her about a new mushroom he discovered that acts as a panacea, which he demonstrates by killing and resurrecting a pigeon. A DEA agent has Marshall under surveillance, and nonchalant agents Copano and Harrington are assigned to investigate him. At a coffee shop, Marshall tells Frances how he found the Blue Angel mushroom that only grows in a remote valley in the Peruvian Highlands. He also states that Reutical has a plant upstream from the valley that risks polluting the area. While Frances takes a call, Marshall becomes paranoid and flees. After talking with Rick about new medicines, Frances debates taking the Blue Angel to Rick. Marshall returns home and notices a security system alarm. The DEA conducts a raid on his house, but Marshall has already escaped with his new pet tortoise Socrates. On the run, Marshall calls Frances in an alleyway.
2	"Lakeshore Limited"	Sean Buckelew	Steve Hely	February 2, 2025	0.18
Connor, a Reutical employee from the Peru facility, meets with Cecily, a federal government official, and Jonas "the Wolf" Backstein, a Reutical board member. Connor recounts witnessing Marshall use the mushroom to save an injured child and demonstrates its healing powers. Cecily escalates the DEA's pursuit of Marshall, while Jonas sends mercenaries to kill him. Marshall, still on the run, tries meeting with Frances and briefly sees his half-brother Zane to get medicine for Socrates. Copano and Harrington begin to question why they are sent to stake out Marshall's home. Frances continues researching the Blue Angel to bring to Reutical and investigates Marshall's house. Marshall arranges to have the notebooks in his house destroyed and his pets moved. However, the men sent to handle this accidentally burn down his house with Frances narrowly escaping. Mercenaries ambush Marshall by broadsiding his car, but he heals himself with a mushroom and escapes. Copano and Harrington pick up Amelia, a mycologist hired to examine Marshall's possessions, but arrive to find the house destroyed. Jonas has Connor shot to ensure total destruction of the mushroom.
3	"Hildy"	Vincent Tsui	Emma Barrie	February 9, 2025	0.14
Marshall flees undercover agents who plant a bug on him. Frances visits her mother Sonia in a care facility and finds a Blue Angel that Marshall left for her. Frances feeds it to Sonia hoping to cure her dementia, but is disappointed when there is no apparent effect. Marshall encounters the site of a car accident and gives a mushroom to John, the critically injured driver. Marshall visits his old mycology mentor Hildy, informing her of his discovery of the Blue Angel. Skeptical, she questions him and theorizes that its properties come from adaptation to Reutical's environmental pollution. When Marshall is reluctant to show her the mushroom, Hildy shoots herself in the chest to force him to give her a mushroom, whereupon she experiences strange visions similar to other characters. Afterwards, Marshall asks for Hildy's help but flees after she tries to shoot him to take the mushrooms for herself. Amelia finds a Blue Angel among evidence from Marshall's house. John, the crash victim, is healing and sees mushroom-induced visions of tiny, naked, white figures. Hildy recruits two other mycologists and seeks Marshall. Sonia sees hallucinations of the same small figures others have seen and greets them, regaining her ability to speak.
4	"Dumpsite"	Camille Bozec	Jean Kyoung Frazier	February 16, 2025	N/A
Frances and Nick, her lackadaisical boyfriend, have sex on the work trip, where Frances falsely agrees to marry him, causing them to have an argument. She then gets a call from her mom's care facility receptionist, who tells her that her mom has seemingly recovered. She leaves Rick and Nick to see her mom, where she finds that the mushroom has healed her. She then leaves to locate Marshall and help him grow them. Meanwhile, Marshall decides to purchase a plot of land near a chemical waste site with the intention of growing the blue angel mushrooms there, believing the contaminated soil essential to their survival. The neighbors near the dumpsite find him suspicious. He uses one of his four remaining mushrooms to attempt to grow more, which fails. Eventually, Frances and Marshall reunite, and she thanks him for helping her mother. Amelia researches the mushroom for the DEA and Cecily, and Harrington tries to go on a date with her, but she gets stood up. Frances begins to settle in with Marshall, but they are attacked by an agent who tries to kill Marshall. The agent steals a bike from Rusty, one of Marshall's neighbours alongside his uncle Sheriff Jimmer, and pursues Marshall. The agent is blown up by a hidden mine planted by the neighbors.
5	"Star-Tel-Lite"	Sean Buckelew	Dave King	February 23, 2025	0.19
Marshall and Frances' neighbors help them out after Marshall heals a dying relative, Tommy, using their second to last mushroom. Frances secretly records this and sends a video to Rick, who shows it to Jonas during a dinner meeting. Jonas claims that the video is fake and plans to remove Rick as CEO. Meanwhile, Copano and Harrington find where Marshall is located and secretly implement spy cameras on the neighbor's house by posing as a satellite dish company known, to Jimmer's annoyance. When Marshall and Frances go to the store, Frances is confronted by Hildy and her gang and quickly leaves. Later, Marshall and Frances go to the forest with Socrates and their final mushroom, letting Socrates pick a spot on the forest floor in a last ditch attempt to grow the mushroom. Socrates defecates on the grow site; the next day, Marshall and Frances find out that the mushrooms have regrown and take one, entering the white figures' mysterious realm. They wake up to police at the door, who arrest him for arson of his previously-burnt down house, which he didn't commit. Before he is taken away to jail, Frances kisses him.
6	"In the System"	Vincent Tsui	Jon Foor	March 2, 2025	N/A
Marshall finds himself incarcerated and denied bail, with his lawyer suggesting that someone powerful may be behind it. A mysterious hitman robs a gas station and calls 911 on himself to get sent to jail with Marshall. Copano and Harrington find Socrates and give him to Frances. Frances takes Socrates and the harvested mushrooms back to Reutical, encouraged by her Mom. Frances visits Marshall in jail, who tells her to meet him at Joshua Tree National Park if he can escape. After talking to Kiki, a knowledgable co-worker working in medicine research, who tells her about how Reutical saved lives with a popular heart disease medication, Frances finally takes the mushrooms to Rick, demanding a promotion and other benefits. Copano and Harrington are separated and assigned new partners as punishment for not recovering the mushrooms. Hildy also visits Marshall in jail and suggests that Frances has betrayed him. After thinking about Frances's past statements, Marshall uses a secret jail phone to call Reutical and asks to be forwarded to Frances. Frances picks up and hears noises from the jail, correctly guessing that it is Marshall who has called her. After Marshall silently hangs up, the hitman corners Marshall, pinning him down and preparing to inject him with a syringe.
7	"Blowfish"	Camille Bozec	Karey Dornetto	March 9, 2025	N/A
A group of other inmates kills the hitman before he can inject Marshall, but demand Marshall use his herbalist knowledge to work for them as a doctor in exchange for saving his life. At her nursing home, Sonia climbs a tree but dies from a fall after a branch breaks beneath her. Frances is devastated but is reassured by Kiki and Kruger, and Reutical starts a fund to research the mushroom in her memory. Marshall discovers that Amelia is volunteering at his prison, which she started doing after using the mushroom she found during the DEA investigation to cure her sick son and learning Marshall was there. She offers to help him escape; Marshall asks her to procure tetrodotoxin for him. Off duty, Harrington visits Copano, who suggests that there is a conspiracy involved in the case, with Rheutical and government officials working together. In his cell, Marshall tells his cellmate he's going to die, and drinks the toxin.
8	"Amelia & Wyatt"	Sean Buckelew	Dan Schofield	March 16, 2025	N/A
The next night, Marshall resurrects and wakes up in the morgue, having been in a death-like state induced by the toxin, and Amelia unzips his cadaver pouch. Amelia sneaks Marshall out, and along with Amelia's son Wyatt they head to Frances's apartment to retrieve Socrates. At a racecourse, Copano and Harrington survey a meeting taking place between Jonas and Cecily, and agree to keep pursuing the case together. Frances breaks up with Nick. Jonas forces Rick to shut down Reutical's project commercializing the mushroom, predicting economic collapse, cartel control, and brutal war if the mushroom is made widely available. Marshall confronts Frances over taking the mushroom to Reutical, reclaiming Socrates and his remaining supply. Frances finds a drawing Wyatt left on her apartment wall showing how the mushroom grows in Socrates's feces. Copano and Harrington discover that Amelia checked out Marshall's body from the morgue. Marshall once again visits Zane for help with Socrates, and Wyatt and Marshall independently observe machine elf-like Lilliputian hallucinations that seem to have persisted from the mushroom trip. Jonas learns he has a serious medical issue. Frances is let go from Reutical; Rick, having saved a mushroom after leaving Reutical, offers that they work together. Marshall, Amelia, and Wyatt arrive back at Marshall's trailer near the chemical waste site to find that Hildy's gang and the neighbors have teamed up, researching how to grow the mushroom.
9	"Cliff's Edge"	Vincent Tsui	Sophie Kriegel	March 23, 2025	N/A
Hildy convinces Marshall to grow the mushrooms, Marshall revealing Socrate's as the missing ingredient, and everybody at the mushroom farm begins to produce them and invite sick people in as test subjects. Meanwhile, Frances and Rick set up a new facility where they try developing a synthetic equivalent of the mushroom, which fails as the users show signs of schizophrenia and other ailments. Copano and Harrington find out that Marshall is still alive and working at the farm when they interrogate Zane, but while Harrington wants to report their findings, Copano asserts that there is a conspiracy at play, and decides to try to solve the Marshall case by himself. Harrington then presents the data to Cecily, who assigns FBI agents to raid the farm and Harrington joining. Back at the hospital, Jonas finds out that he is terminal, with only weeks left to live. He tries to find the mushroom at the original grow site in Peru, but fails, before Cecily tells him Marshall is alive at the farm due to be raided. Meanwhile, Hildy and some other people at the farm are making a tincture of the Blue Angel without Marshall's knowledge or approval. Marshall also finds out that the Blue Angel is being sold for money, and grows concerned about potential side affects. He warns Hildy about the dangers of the mushroom, and Hildy and Marshall go on a walk to discuss it. John, from the car accident, arrives at the farm, ranting about his life becoming a nightmare since using the mushroom and threatens to shoot Marshall before being dragged off. On their walk, as they reach the edge of a cliff, Hildy shoves Marshall off where he violently dies as he falls on several rocks.
10	"Raid"	Camille Bozec	Steve Hely	March 30, 2025	N/A
Copano and Amelia arrive at the farm looking for Marshall. Copano eventually finds his corpse in the woods but resurrects him with a mushroom. Marshall then has a hallucination, where both he and Frances realize they may be able to communicate telepathically. Frances abruptly leaves a meeting with Rick and another CEO, and ends her partnership with Rick to find Marshall at Joshua Tree National Park. Jonas then visits the mushroom farm, and when the FBI begins their raid, he greedily takes several mushrooms at once, which leaves him in a terrifying hallucinatory state. Meanwhile, Copano tells Marshall to escape the raid with Socrates, while he helps Harrington who has been injured in a flipped over truck. Rusty attempts to shoot down the raid's helicopter, and is fatally shot with Copano wounded in the crossfire. Amelia, Wyatt, and Hildy get away, with one of Hildy's associates arrested. In the aftermath, Harrington reveals the mushroom is highly illegal before giving Copano one in the hospital to help him heal. Rick and Kiki discover and market the mushroom's byproduct as "Sparkl," a food additive. Hildy and her accomplices pour the Blue Angel tincture into a city's water tower. Zane acquires numerous tortoises from Peru. Marshall and Frances reunite at Joshua Tree and decide to continue their work growing the mushrooms. Harrington motorcycles into the desert to find Marshall and Frances.

== Development ==
=== Conception ===
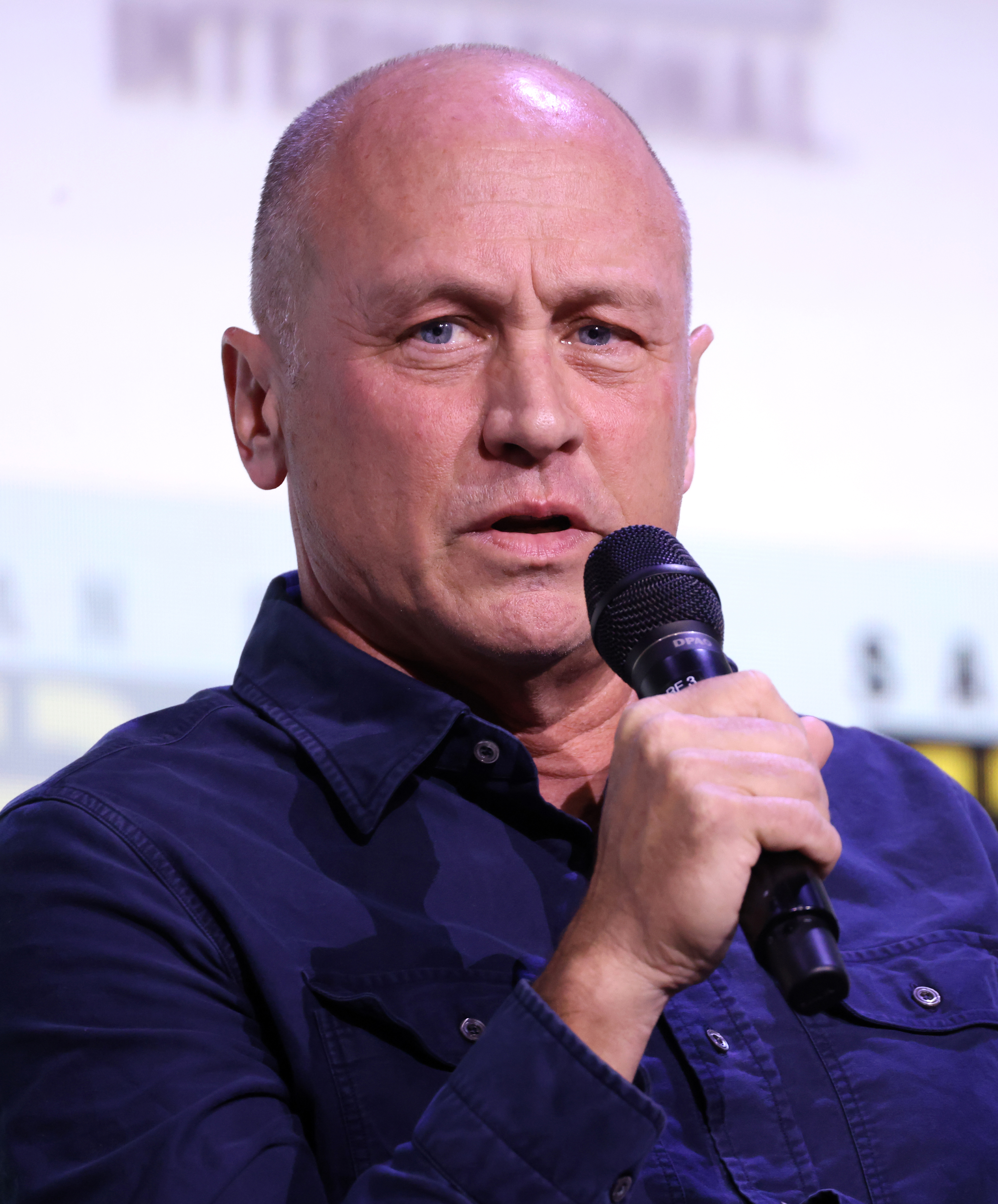
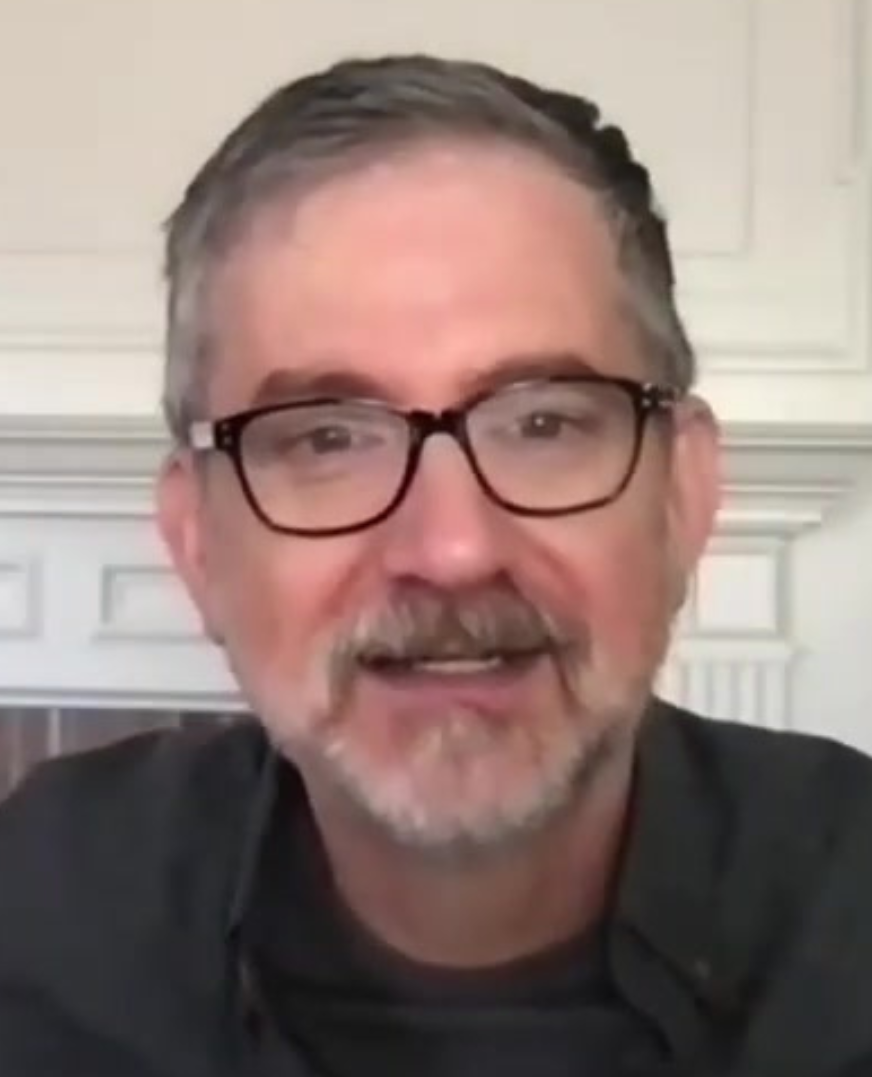
Mike Judge (in 2025) and Greg Daniels (in 2022), co-founders of Bandera Entertainment

Common Side Effects was created by Joe Bennett and Steve Hely, who were introduced through Bandera Entertainment, a production company founded by King of the Hill co-creators Mike Judge and Greg Daniels. Daniels had known Hely through their work together on The Office, while Judge knew Bennett as an animator. As Bandera was being established, Bennett and Hely were brought together through a "blind date", bonding over shared interests in mushrooms, the pharmaceutical and healthcare industries, and South America. The premise for Common Side Effects was developed in 2019 as a thought experiment about a hypothetical medicine which could cure "almost anything", and the consequences of its discovery.

From this premise, Bennett and Hely developed the show's main characters, Marshall Cuso, Frances Applewhite and Rick Kruger. Marshall was modeled after various mycologists and ethnobotanists, including Paul Stamets, Terence McKenna, Wade Davis and Richard Evans Schultes. He was further based on Chris Cooper's portrayal of John Laroche in Spike Jonze's Adaptation (2002). Frances was designed as an empathetic character, grounded in everyday struggles such as financial strain and caregiving for her mother, as well as a more practical counterpart to Marshall. Rick, a pharmaceutical CEO, was conceived as a character trapped in "the system" and caught up in its incentives, rather than being inherently evil.

=== Writing ===
Bennett and Hely sought to combine the crime thriller genre with comedy, inspired by the films of the Coen brothers, such as Burn After Reading. The show was purchased by Amazon in 2019, who Hely stated "didn’t quite get it," and they eventually sold Common Side Effects to Warner Bros. Discovery.

=== Casting ===
Dave King was cast as Marshall Cuso after Bennett heard him on The Great Debates, a podcast co-hosted by Hely and King, who had known each other for decades and grew up in the same town. Although Bennett and Hely questioned casting King due to his limited professional experience, they embraced the casting after Adult Swim network executives called him "perfect" for the role. Emily Pendergast, who Hely had previously worked with on Veep, was cast for the versatility required of Frances' role, as well as her natural acting ability. Mike Judge, an executive producer for the show, was cast as Rick after Bennett and Hely sought out an actor whose presence would appeal when a character's would not, noting Rick's "charm[ing]" voice being similar to Hank Hill's.

Agents Copano and Harrington, two Drug Enforcement Administration (DEA) agents, were voiced by Joseph Lee Anderson and Martha Kelly, respectively. Anderson, who Hely thought had "a cool voice", worked with Hely's wife on the show Young Rock, and had more scenes written for him due to his intriguing portrayal of Copano. Kelly, who Bennett remarked had "always wanted to play a detective" and worked with on several of his short films, was highlighted for the comedic value in her uncharacteristic voice for the role of a DEA agent.

Many of the other characters' voice actors were chosen with little forethought, or were voiced by Bennett and Hely themselves. Bennett and Hely took a naturalist approach to voice acting, prioritizing natural speaking voices that fit a given character. They often instructed the voice actors to "do less acting", aiming to capture the authenticity in their performance and mannerisms.

=== Animation ===
Common Side Effects is animated by Green Street Pictures, a studio based in Pasadena, California founded by Joe Bennett, Sean Buckelew, James Merrill, and Benjy Brooke. The studio was founded in 2020 to create Scavengers Reign (2023), on which Bennett served as co-creator. Many of the artists who worked on Scavengers Reign went on to work on Common Side Effects. The studio worked with international artists from France, Portugal, Spain and Mexico, as well as Argentinian animation studio Le Cube. The show was animated using various products from the Adobe suite, as well as Adobe Animate, Toon Boom Harmony, and TVPaint Animation.

== Release ==
The series was first announced by Adult Swim on June 16, 2023, during the Annecy International Animation Film Festival. On May 28, 2024, it was announced the pilot episode would be screened for its world premiere at the 2024 Annecy Festival on June 12. Adult Swim later screened the pilot during their "Night of New" event at San Diego Comic-Con 2024 on July 26; a "first look" trailer was additionally published to YouTube the same day. An additional "Night of New" screening took place at New York Comic Con on October 17.

A press release for the series was set for release on December 4, but held back due to the Killing of Brian Thompson, and was again held back on December 9 following the arrest of Luigi Mangione. On December 12, the official trailer was released, announcing the show's premiere on February 2, 2025 with two back-to-back episodes. The first season aired on Sundays between February 2 to March 30 at 11:30 pm ET/PT.

Two days before the first season's finale aired, on March 28, Adult Swim announced Common Side Effects had been renewed for a second season. Annecy unveiled the 2026 Annecy Festival's "Work in Progress" line-up on April 14, 2026, including the second season of Common Side Effects. The second season was previewed at the festival on June 25, and slated for release on January 24, 2027. The season was further previewed at San Diego Comic-Con 2026 on July 24, and appeared at New York Comic Con on October 9.

Common Side Effects is available to watch on HBO Max, where episodes stream the day after their airing. In the United Kingdom, the show is aired on Channel 4. For promotional purposes, the series aired on Adult Swim’s sister networks TBS and TNT on March 28, 2025 and February 14-15, 2025, respectively.

== Reception ==
Common Side Effects has received widespread critical acclaim. On the review aggregator website Rotten Tomatoes, it holds a 100% approval rating from 28 critic reviews. It was additionally named one of the best TV shows of 2025 by media outlets including The New York Times, The Hollywood Reporter, the Los Angeles Times and The Guardian.

=== Accolades ===
Year	Award	Category	Nominee(s)	Result	Ref.
2025	Creative Arts Emmy Awards	Primetime Emmy Award for Outstanding Animated Program	Joe Bennett, Steve Hely, Mike Judge, Greg Daniels, Dustin Davis, James Merrill, Sean Buckelew, Kelly Crews, Suzanna Makkos, Dave King, Dan Schofield, Max Minor, Susan Shi, Paige Boudreaux, Jonathan Roig, Sophie Kriegel, Vincent Tsui, Benjy Brooke (Episode: "Cliff's Edge")	Nominated	
2025	TCA Awards	TCA Award for Outstanding New Program	Common Side Effects	Nominated	
2025	Environmental Media Awards	Paul Junger Witt Comedy Series	Common Side Effects (Episode: "Pilot")	Won	
2026	Annie Awards	Best General Audience Animated Television Broadcast Production	Green Street Pictures, Bandera Entertainment, and Williams Street Productions (Episode: "Pilot")	Won	
2026	Annie Awards	Outstanding Achievement for Directing in an Animated Television/Broadcast Production	Vincent Tsui (Episode: "Cliff's Edge")	Won	
2026	Annie Awards	Outstanding Achievement for Music in an Animated Television/Broadcast Production	Nicolas Snyder (Episode: "Lakeshore Limited")	Nominated	
2026	Annie Awards	Outstanding Achievement for Writing in an Animated Television/Broadcast Production	Joe Bennett, Steve Hely (Episode: "Pilot")	Won	
2026	Annie Awards	Outstanding Achievement for Editorial in an Animated Television/Broadcast Production	Tony Christopherson, Joie Lim (Episode: "Raid")	Won	
2026	Film Independent Spirit Awards	Best New Scripted Series	Joe Bennett, Steve Hely, Mike Judge, Greg Daniels, Dustin Davis, James Merrill, Sean Buckelew, Benjy Brooke, Kelly Crews, Suzanna Makkos, Dave King	Nominated	
2026	Peabody Awards	Entertainment	Green Street Pictures, Bandera Entertainment and Williams Street Productions	Won	
