= Haha, You Clowns =

American adult animated comedy television series

- Genre: Adult animation; Animated sitcom; New sincerity; Surreal humour
- Created by: Joe Cappa
- Based on: Haha, You Clowns by Joe Cappa
- Written by: Joe Cappa; Dave Cappa
- Directed by: Nick Bertonazzi Jr.
- Starring: Joe Cappa
- Composer: Delicate Steve
- Country of origin: United States
- Original language: English
- No. of seasons: 1
- No. of episodes: 10

Production
- Executive producers: Joe Cappa; Carl Faruolo; Dave Hughes; Joe Bennett; Kelly Crews; Cameron Tang
- Producer: Rochelle Perry
- Running time: 11 minutes
- Production company: Williams Street

Original release
- Network: Adult Swim
- Release: October 19, 2025 – present

Haha, You Clowns is an American adult animated comedy television series created by Joe Cappa for Cartoon Network's nighttime programming block Adult Swim. It is based on the 2023 Adult Swim Smalls series of the same name, and is the first Small to be picked up as a full series. The series premiered on Adult Swim on October 19, 2025, although the first episode premiered on Adult Swim's YouTube channel two weeks prior on October 7, 2025. In December 2025, the series was renewed for a second and third season.

== Premise ==
Tom Campbell is a local weatherman who lives in a big house with his three sons: Tristan, Preston, and Duncan. While Tom is still grieving the death of his beloved wife, his sons are always there to keep him grounded.

== Characters ==
=== Main cast ===
- The Campbell Boys – A trio of tall, muscular, codependent, teenage brothers, who love their father and each other. They all have the same middle-part haircut in different colors and live in the Midwest with their father at 10647 Butternut Road, a large two-story house. All three brothers think their dad is very cool and are often trying to help him deal with the loss of their mother. They each have a girlfriend, and the six of them are frequently hanging out as a group. They love hanging out in their backyard pool, watching movies at home, and playing the video game Call to the Battalion on headsets with an Indian man named Darshan. They perform a weekly karaoke concert as a trio for the seniors at Maple Hills Retirement Home, where their paternal grandmother lives. With their father, they regularly attend Sunday mass at St. Mary's Church.
  - Preston Campbell (voiced by Joe Cappa) – The oldest brother and the leader of the brothers. He's the only brother who is old enough to drive a car. He has a job handing out samples to customers at Savers Wholesale, a Costco-esque store. Preston has blond hair and is the only one of the three boys who wears earrings.
  - Tristan Campbell (voiced by Joe Cappa) – Tristan is the middle brother who's often joking around. He takes improv classes from Todd Rodd at a theater called Project Improv. He has light brownish hair.
  - Duncan Campbell (voiced by Joe Cappa) – The youngest and most innocent of the three brothers. Duncan has brown hair and a peanut allergy.
- Tom Campbell (voiced by Joe Cappa) – The Campbell boys' loving father who is grieving the loss of his wife, their mother, and raising them as a single dad. Tom is the chief meteorologist and an on-air weatherman at the struggling local TV station, Channel 2. Like his sons, he is very muscular and kind. In college, he was in a fraternity, and his favorite movie is Down Periscope.

=== Recurring characters ===
- Katie (voiced by Kirsten Cappa) – Preston's blonde girlfriend.
- Chelsea (voiced by Crystal Ortiz) – Tristan's brown-haired girlfriend.
- Duncan's Girlfriend – Duncan's girlfriend has appeared in multiple episodes, but she has not spoken nor been given a name in the show. She has blonde hair.
- Jeanette "The Black Widow" Lee (voiced by herself), a professional pool player who lives nextdoor to the Campbells and often gives the boys advice while she plays billiards in her backyard and regales them with stories. She has a full bar, pool table, and case full of her trophies in her backyard. She is friends with and has dated a lot of celebrities, like Sean Penn and Robin Wright. The boys see her in a romantic relationship with Sean Astin in "Duncan Holds a Baby," and she previously dated Anthony LaPaglia.
- Dory (voiced by June Squibb) – Preston's co-worker, a sweet, elderly fellow sample distributor at Savers Wholesale.
- Lexi (voiced by Kirsten Cappa) – A virtual assistant in the Campbells' home, with whom they occasionally interact.

=== Guest actors ===
- Sean Astin as himself
- Justin Theroux as Justin
- Cheri Oteri as Brianne
- Eric Wareheim as Uncle Kelsey
- Frankie Quiñones as Roger
- Paul Rudd as Todd Rodd
- Dax Flame as Will/Various
- Debra Wilson as Various
- Darshan Magdum as himself
- Isabella Blake-Thomas as Agatha/Various
- Marc M. as Frank/Doug/Bruski/Various
- Fred Tatasciore as Gary/Frank 2
- Andrew Ball as Don/Jeff/Various
- Vanessa Marshall as Valorie
- Dave Boat as Chet/Phil
- June Squibb as Ruth Dory

== Production ==
=== Development ===
Joe Cappa taught himself how to animate and began making independent animated videos for social media in 2021. He was inspired by Mike Judge, Australian animator Jarrad Wright, and Sick Animation founder Marc M. In 2022, one of Cappa's videos, a Teletubbies riff called "Gabagoblins," went viral on TikTok, and Dave Hughes, executive producer of Adult Swim's Smalls program for short online videos, reached out to Cappa to pitch him short videos. From fall of 2022 to fall 2023, Cappa made seven 2-3-minute Haha, You Clowns shorts for the Adult Swim Smalls channel, in which he introduced the characters of Preston, Tristan, Duncan, and their dad, as well as voicing all four of them himself. The series was based on an animated short he made in 2021 called "Halloween Ep," which is a parody of the sitcom Home Improvement. In it, Cappa voiced Tim Allen and the actors who played his three sons on the show. When adapting the short to a web series, Cappa made the father and sons all original characters with different personalities from his Home Improvement video. He created the show as a riff on wholesome family programming like 7th Heaven and the 1992 Mormon film The Buttercream Gang.

Following the web series, Adult Swim commissioned a script for a pilot episode of a quarter-hour series of Haha, You Clowns, based on the shorts. After Cappa wrote the script, Adult Swim announced that they had ordered a 10-episode first season of the show in June 2024. In December 2025, Adult Swim renewed the series for a second and a third season.

=== Writing ===
Joe Cappa wrote the pilot, but the rest of the first season is entirely co-written by Cappa and his brother Dave, who lives in England and writes the show with Joe via text messaging. When Adult Swim greenlit the show, Cappa didn't know any writers and hired his brother. The series is loosely based on the Cappa brothers' relationship with their dad. Cheri Oteri voices a character in the eighth episode that the Cappas specifically wrote with her in mind.

=== Animation ===
Cappa wants the animation style to seem crude and instructs new animators to draw the show as if it's "like a live-action director was given an animated show, and they don’t know how to draw that well, and they have to somehow execute their idea."

Cappa's wife Kirsten voices many of the female characters on the show, including Duncan's girlfriend Katie. Cappa hired musician Delicate Steve to score the show with guitar riffs in the spirit of 90s sitcoms. The show is made in Adobe Animate.

== Episodes ==
All episodes are written by Joe Cappa with Dave Cappa co-writing since the second episode.

No.	Title	Animation directed by	Storyboarded by	Original release date	US viewers (millions)
1	"Movie Night"	Nick Bertonazzi Jr.	Clay Morrow & Lindsey DeMars	October 19, 2025	0.12
The boys notice their dad keeps leaving their movie nights early. When Preston gets a recommendation for the horror movie "Terror Within," he thinks it might be just what they need to bond over movie night again.
2	"Viral"	Nick Bertonazzi Jr.	Amish Kumar & Citlalli Anderson	October 26, 2025	N/A
The boys and the news staff all try to push Tom to dance during his weather report to make a viral video. After attempts to get him to dance fail, Tom has his moment when he calls his boys to warn them about a coming tornado.
3	"Bomber Jacket"	Nick Bertonazzi Jr.	Eva Sterrett	November 2, 2025	0.11
After a night out at Casa Baja, Preston loses his favorite bomber jacket and is unable to find it, making him act more rude and irritable to everyone, until he gets a house visit from a pair of cops.
4	"Plane"	Nick Bertonazzi Jr.	Jackie Acki Lewis & Kiwon Lee	November 9, 2025	0.16
The family takes a plane ride to Cancun, but Tom has trouble coping with the shaky flight without his wife. However, when Duncan suffers from a peanut allergy, Tom finds the courage to help him.
5	"Duncan Holds a Baby"	Nick Bertonazzi Jr.	Clay Morrow & Lindsey DeMars	November 16, 2025	0.12
The boys plan a party for their dental hygienist, Valerie, and her new baby. But Duncan is afraid of dropping the baby, leading him to seek advice from Jeanette.
6	"Dad's Birthday"	Nick Bertonazzi Jr.	Amish Kumar & Citlalli Anderson	November 23, 2025	0.12
The boys throw a surprise party for their dad's birthday at their house, but Tom gets increasingly panicked when his old frat brother Bruski tells the boys about his heavy drinking days in college, and when he went "Hulk Mode." Later, the boys learn about how Tom turned away from alcoholism, and his connection with a Chinese student from that time.
7	"Hot Tub"	Nick Bertonazzi Jr.	Jackie Acki Lewis & Kiwon Lee	November 30, 2025	0.11
The boys set up their nana's old hot tub at their house, but forget to properly sterlize it first, leading all of them to become horribly sick.
8	"Call to the Battalion"	Nick Bertonazzi Jr.	Clay Morrow & Lindsey DeMars	December 7, 2025	N/A
The boys set up a dinner date between their father and a woman named "BriBri" (voiced by Cheri Oteri) who they met in an online shooter game. However, her personality soon clashes with everyone else.
9	"Therapy"	Nick Bertonazzi Jr.	Amish Kumar & Citlalli Anderson	December 14, 2025	N/A
With the stress of the holidays approaching, and their usual therapist on vacation, the boys are referred to a different therapist named Justin (voiced by Justin Theroux). However, Justin carries his own trauma that he unloads on the boys.
10	"Improv"	Nick Bertonazzi Jr.	Jackie Acki Lewis & Kiwon Lee	December 21, 2025	N/A
Tristan gets into a new hobby of improv comedy, but gets increasingly desperate for a laugh when his jokes don't land.

== Release ==
Haha, You Clowns premiered on October 19, 2025 on Adult Swim, with episodes airing weekly and having their streaming premieres the next day on HBO Max. The show had its world premiere at San Diego Comic Con on July 25, 2025.

== Reception ==
Haha, You Clowns has received positive reviews from The Wall Street Journal and BubbleBlabber.
