= We Broke Up (film) =

- Film poster
- Directed by: Jeff Rosenberg
- Written by: Jeff Rosenberg; Laura Jacqmin
- Produced by: Matt Ratner; John Hermann; Mason Novick; Jeff Rosenberg
- Starring: Aya Cash; William Jackson Harper
- Music by: Nick Sena
- Distributed by: Vertical Entertainment
- Release date: April 23, 2021
- Running time: 80 minutes
- Country: United States
- Language: English
- Box office: $15,063

We Broke Up is a 2021 American comedy film directed by Jeff Rosenberg and starring Aya Cash and William Jackson Harper.

== Plot ==
Lori and Doug decide to end their long relationship. However, life gives them a second chance when they are invited to Lori's younger sibling's wedding ceremony as a couple. Will they be able to save their relationship or end it forever?

== Cast ==
- Aya Cash as Lori
- William Jackson Harper as Doug
- Sarah Bolger as Bea
- Tony Cavalero as Jayson
- Peri Gilpin as Adelaide
- Kobi Libii as Ari
- Azita Ghanizada as Roya
- Zak Steiner as Eric
- Eduardo Franco as Mike
- Larisa Oleynik as Tia
- Emily Pendergast as Allison
- Eric Martig as Dominic
- Brenda Ballard as Helen
- Gary Ballard as Herb
- Pedro Lopez as Salvatore
- Lee Chen as May
- Alex Rich as Paul
- Tom Zawacki as Chaz

== Release ==
The film was released in theaters and on demand April 23, 2021.

== Reception ==
On review aggregator website Rotten Tomatoes, the film holds an approval rating of 67% based on 24 reviews, with an average rating of 6/10. The website's critics consensus reads: "Despite not living up to the potential of its premise, We Broke Up more than makes up for it thanks largely to Aya Cash and William Jackson Harper's relatable performances." On Metacritic, the film has a weighted average score of 55 out of 100, based on 6 critics, indicating "mixed or average reviews".
