= Emily Pendergast =

American actress (born 1987)

- Born: Emily Sulenski; February 25, 1987 (age 39)
- Education: Ohio University
- Occupation: Actress
- Spouse: Cory Pendergast (m. 2012)

Emily Pendergast (née Sulenski; born February 25, 1987) is an American actress. She has appeared on TV series such as Veep, Common Side Effects, and Jury Duty Presents: Company Retreat. She is a longtime member of the Groundlings improvisational comedy troupe.

== Early life ==
Pendergast grew up in Canfield, Ohio. She was a big fan of Saturday Night Live growing up, sometimes reenacting Dana Carvey or Adam Sandler sketches in home videos. She graduated from Canfield High School in 2005, where she played soccer as a letterwinner all four years. She also sang in the choir and had small roles in theater. She majored in psychology at Ohio University, graduating in 2009.

== Career ==
Pendergast moved to Los Angeles after college to pursue an acting career. She began working as a waitress and took classes with the Groundlings improvisational and sketch comedy group. She said she had "looked up my comedic north stars and realized that Groundlings was the common denominator of several of them". She immediately discovered that the Groundlings "felt like home" and was eventually promoted to the main company in 2017.

In 2019, she played the recurring role of Beth Ryan, wife of presidential candidate Jonah, on the last season of the HBO political satire Veep.

In 2025, she voiced the main role of Frances on the Netflix adult animated series Common Side Effects, reuniting with former Veep writer Steve Hely.

In 2026, she played the main role of Amy on the Amazon Prime Video series Jury Duty Presents: Company Retreat.

== Personal life ==
She married Cory Pendergast on September 8, 2012.

== Filmography ==
=== Film ===
Year	Title	Role	Notes
2019	This Isn't Funny	Kendra	TV film
2021	We Broke Up	Allison	
2022	Out of Office	Margie	TV film
2023	The Donor Party	Nurse	
2023	LaRoy, Texas	Kayla	
2025	Descendent	Kimmie	

=== Television ===
Year	Title	Role	Notes
2016	You Can Do Better	Various	4 episodes
2018	Love	Leah	Episode: "Sarah from College"
2019	Veep	Beth Ryan	Recurring role (season 7)
2020	Mike Tyson Mysteries	Various	2 episodes; voice role
2020	Indebted	Jenny	Episode: "Everybody's Talking About Pleasure"
2021	The Conners	Lisa	Episode: "Who Are Bosses, Boats and Eckhart Tolle?"
2021	Miracle Workers	Lionel's Wife	Episode: "Oregon Trail: Hunting Party"
2023	White House Plumbers	Edwina	Episode: "Please Destroy This, Huh?"
2024	Curb Your Enthusiasm	Flight Attendant	Episode: "No Lessons Learned"
2025–	Common Side Effects	Frances Applewhite	Main role; voice role
2025–2026	Leanne	Faye	3 episodes
2026	Jury Duty Presents	Amy Patterson	Main role (season 2)
2026	Robot Chicken Adult Swim Special	Frances Applewhite, Triana Orpheus	Television Special
