= No Lessons Learned =

- Curb Your Enthusiasm episode
- Episode no.: Season 12; Episode 10
- Directed by: Jeff Schaffer
- Story by: Larry David; Jeff Schaffer
- Cinematography by: Patrick Alexander Stewart
- Editing by: Steven Rasch
- Original air date: April 7, 2024
- Running time: 53 minutes

Guest appearances
- Jerry Seinfeld as Himself; Richard Lewis as Himself; Ted Danson as Himself; Bruce Springsteen as Himself; Tracey Ullman as Irma Kostroski; Saverio Guerra as Mocha Joe; Alexander Vindman as Himself; Allison Janney as Cynthia; Dean Norris as Judge Whittaker; Greg Kinnear as Earl Mack; Ellia English as Auntie Rae; Dana Lee as Takahashi; Sanaa Lathan as Sibby Sanders; Joe Scarborough as Himself; Mika Brzezinski as Herself; Willie Geist as Himself; Dan Abrams as Himself; Chris Hayes as Himself; Nicole Suárez as Herself; Sharlto Copley as Michael Fouchay; Emily Pendergast as Flight Attendant; Iris Bahr as Rachel Heineman; Jillian Bell as Maureen; Angel Laketa Moore as Waitress; Eric Mack Jr. as Black Bellman; Dash McCloud as Kid; Lauren Holt as Kid's Mother; David Saucedo as Bailiff; Sonny Saito as Katsuya Maitre'd; Bailey Thompson as Tara Michaelson; Neiko Neal as Jail Guard; Kschris Anda as Foreperson Juror; Jay Renshaw as Larry the Juror; Kandiss Crone as Newscaster; Brandon Arroyo as Newscaster; Catherine Grady as Newscaster; Tarnue Massaquoi as Inmate; Martin Carlin as Joe Pesci Juror; Mary Hollis Inboden as Praying Woman

Episode chronology
← Previous "Ken/Kendra"	Next → —
- Curb Your Enthusiasm season 12

"No Lessons Learned" is the series finale of the American television sitcom Curb Your Enthusiasm. It is the tenth episode of the twelfth season and the 120th episode overall of the series. The episode was directed by executive producer Jeff Schaffer, with the story written by series creator and star Larry David and Schaffer. The episode first aired on HBO in the United States on April 7, 2024, and was also available on Max on the same date.

The series stars Larry David as a fictionalized version of himself. It follows David's life as a semi-retired television writer and producer in Los Angeles and his misadventures in his daily life. The season saw Larry facing a trial after violating the Election Integrity Act of 2021 in Atlanta. In the final episode, Larry's trial begins and he faces his past catching up to him. The episode mirrors the final episode of Seinfeld.

According to Nielsen Media Research, the episode was seen by an estimated 0.530 million household viewers and gained a 0.11 ratings share among adults aged 18–49. The series finale received critical acclaim, and the series was commended for its references and ending. In addition, it also features the final appearance of Richard Lewis, who died in late February 2024 after the episode was filmed.

== Plot ==
Larry, Leon, Jeff and Susie head to Atlanta for Larry's trial. On the plane, Larry is scolded for not switching off his phone, and immediately snitches on Leon and Jeff amidst the argument. Larry and his lawyer, Sibby Sanders arrive at the trial, with some protesters supporting him outside, one of whom is Ted Danson. At the trial, District Attorney Earl Mack paints Larry as a danger to society for his actions, while Sibby uses her testimony to challenge the Election Integrity Act of 2021.

Mack calls many character witnesses to testify, including Mocha Joe, Matsue Takahashi, Alexander Vindman, and many others who Larry has angered throughout the years. That night, Larry and Jeff manage to obtain the secret recipe for a salad dressing from Auntie Rae, which Jeff gives to Susie for their anniversary. As he discusses the case with his friends, Larry receives advice from Leon; he must draw compassion from the jury to win them over. The following day, Susie enters the court room using a wheelchair, as a lover of Larry, with Larry faking good deeds to improve his image. Sibby summons Rae to support Larry, but she angrily goes on a tirade, calling Larry and Jeff out for stealing her recipe. Realizing this is where her gift came from, Susie angrily exits the room. Later at a bar, Larry runs into Jerry Seinfeld.

The following day, Larry testifies, acting compassionate by claiming he just wanted to help Rae as there was nothing to cover her from the sun. Mack then questions Larry, asking him to remember many of his misdeeds, using it to point that the Act is required to prevent society from ending due to people like Larry. The jury finds Larry guilty. Judge Whittaker tells Larry he hopes he finally learned a lesson and sentences him to one year in prison. While sitting in his cell, Seinfeld suddenly shows up, telling Larry that he saw one of the jurors at a Mexican restaurant the previous night, causing a mistrial due to the juror breaking jury sequestration, and Larry is allowed to be released. As he walks off, Larry tells Seinfeld, "this is how we should've ended the Seinfeld finale." On the flight back home, Larry and his friends get into an argument when Susie opens the plane's window shade.

== Production ==
=== Development ===
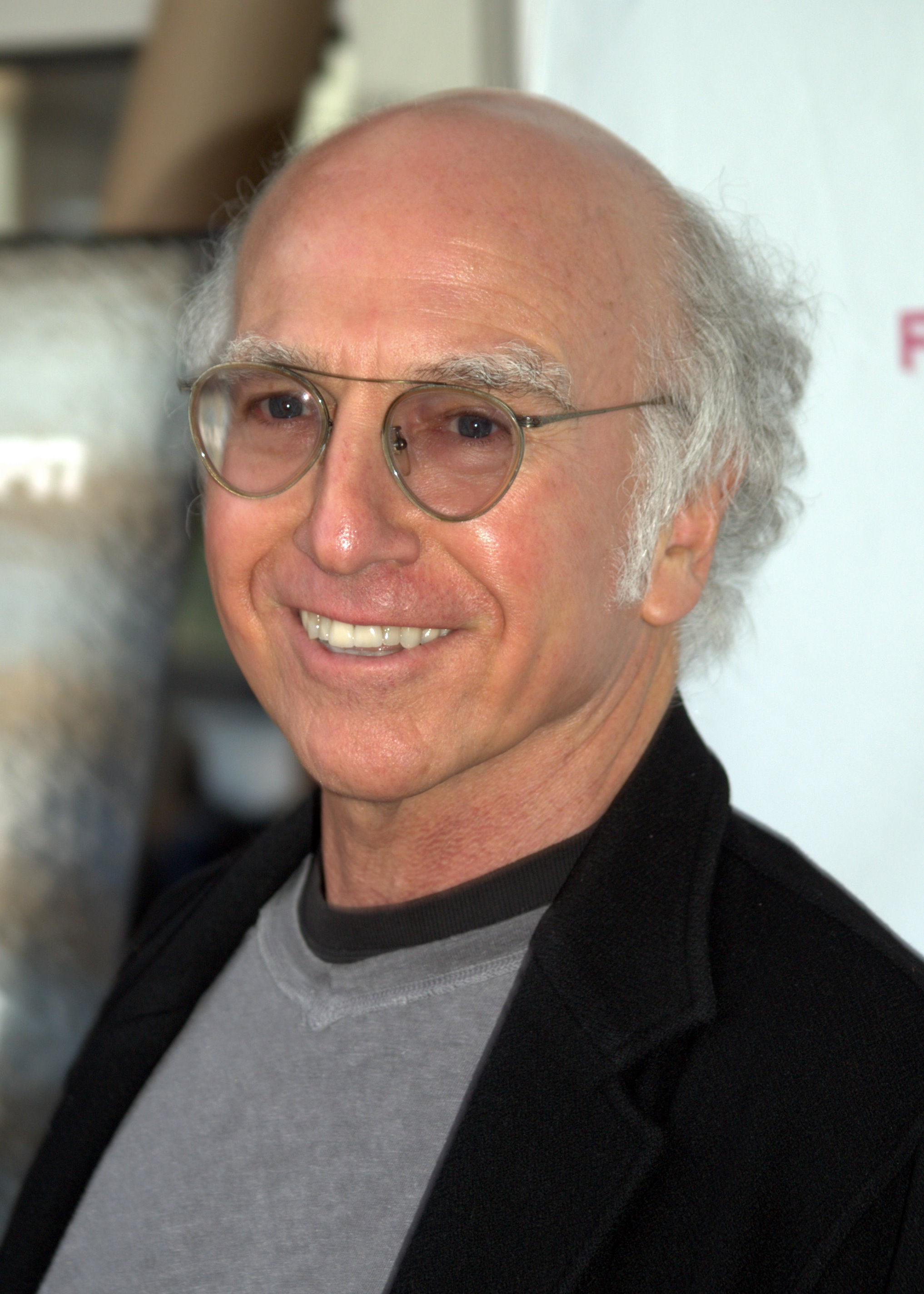
Series creator and main star Larry David wrote the series finale.

In December 2023, it was announced that the twelfth season of the series would be the last. Larry David said, "As Curb comes to an end, I will now have the opportunity to finally shed this 'Larry David' persona and become the person God intended me to be – the thoughtful, kind, caring, considerate human being I was until I got derailed by portraying this malignant character." David had previously teased the possibility of the series ending, but he confirmed the series' ending the following month, saying "Yeah, I said it before. But I wasn't 76 when I said it." David explained that his age played a factor in the decision, "I'm too old to be on camera every week now, to act the way I do on the show. How can I continue to act like that? It's insane! I could do it in my 50s and 60s and mid-70s. I'm not going into the 80s acting like that!"

Weeks prior to its airing, the finale's title was revealed as "No Lessons Learned". The New York Times noted similarities to the Seinfeld series finale, writing that the title "certainly nods at the core ethos of Seinfeld, minted by David: "no hugging, no learning", meaning the characters don't evolve as people or become sentimental. (Not to mention that Larry is, in fact, facing a trial this season.)"

=== Writing ===
Through the season, many trades noticed similarities to the Seinfeld series finale, particularly over the main story arc involving Larry preparing for a trial. While the series finale received a polarizing response, David has been known for defending the finale since its airing, which is also referenced in Curb Your Enthusiasm. The episode makes multiple references to the finale, following a similar structure in which past characters return to condemn Larry.

Executive producer Jeff Schaffer said, "What I love about the finale is that it touches on something bigger than the show. We often blur the line between real Larry and TV Larry, but here there is no line at all: Both Larrys have never learned a lesson – and thank the Gods for it."

== Reception ==
=== Ratings ===
The episode was watched by 0.530 million viewers, earning a 0.11 in the 18–49 rating demographics on the Nielsen Media Research ratings scale. This means that 0.11 percent of all households with televisions watched the episode. This was a 56% increase from the previous episode, which was watched by 0.339 million viewers with a 0.05 in the 18–49 demographics.

=== Critical reception ===
"No Lessons Learned" received critical acclaim. The review aggregator website Rotten Tomatoes reported a 96% approval rating for the episode, with an average rating of 8.2/10 and based on 24 reviews. The site's consensus reads: "Going out at a characteristically cranky note, Larry David doubles down on the notorious Seinfeld finale and actually vindicates the formula with this uproariously clever sign off."

Meredith Hobbs Coons of The A.V. Club gave the episode a "B" and wrote, "As they walk away from the cell, they realize, 'This is how we should have ended the finale.' And now they've had their chance. They got to have their little do-over, and you know what? I'm happy for them. Congrats on getting the ending you wanted, and congrats on 12 successful seasons, L.D."

Ben Travers of IndieWire gave the episode a "B+" and wrote, "If the Curb finale is meant to rewrite the Seinfeld ending in any way, it's during that first scene between Jerry and Larry. Their silly hypothetical about the Bearded Lady lets us see Larry and Jerry, the co-creators of Seinfeld, cracking each other up. They're playing out the kind of scene they used to write for Jerry and George, and getting that silly, joyful spark between two TV legends – even for a moment – is pure bliss. Maybe that finale didn't have enough of those moments for some of you, but this one sure does. And either way, Larry doesn't give a shit. He's just having a laugh." Noel Murray of The New York Times wrote, "Even if the Curb Your Enthusiasm finale lacked a sense of surprise, it did feel right for the show. One of David's go-to moves throughout Curb Your Enthusiasm has been the 'OK, I get it' shrug, deployed whenever Larry realizes he may have gone too far and that whatever punishment coming to him is probably fair. He never gets to that point in this episode, although early on he does gleefully tell a small child that at age 76, he has 'never learned a lesson'. This, in a way, is the Larry shrug distilled into a single line. Larry is who he is, and this show was what it was. Who would ever expect anything more than that?"

Brian Lowry of CNN wrote, "All told, as Larry is fond of saying, the result was pretty, pretty good, and indeed, even a bit better than that. And while Larry made a point in the episode of saying he hadn’t learned a thing in his life, grading this on the spectrum of series finales would suggest otherwise." Daniel D'Addario wrote, "On Seinfeld, one admires the logic; on Curb, one admires the audacity. Which also meant that on Seinfeld, those who were not bitterly disappointed by the finale could appreciate a certain poetic logic to it. The only poetry to Curb's finale was free verse. Larry will be missed. But he may just deserve a break."

Similarly, William Earl, also from Variety, praised the finale, and considered the final scene "a perfect summation of what made the series brilliantly obsessive and petty." Erin Jensen of USA Today wrote, "Raise your Latte Larry's mugs. It's time to toast the Curb Your Enthusiasm finale."
