= Making Babies (2018 film) =

- Film poster
- Directed by: Josh F. Huber
- Written by: Josh F. Huber
- Produced by: Fred Roos
- Starring: Eliza Coupe; Steve Howey; Ed Begley Jr. Glenne Headly; Bob Stephenson
- Cinematography: Matt Edwards
- Edited by: Jay Deuby; Michael Swingler
- Music by: Keegan DeWitt
- Release date: February 2, 2018
- Running time: 86 minutes
- Country: United States
- Language: English

Making Babies is a 2018 comedy film directed by Josh F. Huber and starring Eliza Coupe, Steve Howey, Ed Begley Jr., Glenne Headly (in her final film appearance), and Bob Stephenson.

== Plot ==
John and Katie have been actively trying to conceive for many years with no luck. They decide to try fertility treatments.

== Cast ==
- Eliza Coupe as Katie Kelly
- Steve Howey as John Kelly
- Ed Begley Jr. as Dr. Remis
- Glenne Headly as Bird
- Bob Stephenson as Gordon
- Elizabeth Rodriguez as Maria
- Jennifer Lafleur as Danica
- Jon Daly as Caesar
- Laird Macintosh as Officer Powers
- Heidi Gardner as Meg
- Eric Normington as Brad
- Pam Cook as Nurse Virginia
- Ericka Kreutz as Nurse Bartlett
- Juston Street as Kenny
- Joanie Searle as Peyton
- Julie Wittner as Dr. Hope

== Reception ==
The film received negative reviews from critics. The review aggregator website Rotten Tomatoes reported a 25% approval rating based on eight critics with an average rating of 5.4/10.
