= Out of Office =

- movie poster
- Written by: Paul Lieberstein
- Directed by: Paul Lieberstein
- Starring: Ken Jeong; Milana Vayntrub; Jay Pharoah; Leslie Jones; Jason Alexander; Cheri Oteri; Chris Gethard; Emily Pendergast; Oscar Nuñez
- Theme music composer: Antonio Andrade
- Country of origin: United States
- Original language: English

Production
- Producer: Luke Kelly-Clyne
- Editor: Todd Zelin
- Production companies: CBS Television Studios; MTV Entertainment Studios; Propagate

Original release
- Network: Comedy Central
- Release: September 5, 2022

Out of Office is a 2022 American comedy television film. It aired on Comedy Central on September 5, 2022.

== Plot ==
A remote worker dealing with the pitfalls of a digital commute.

== Cast ==
- Ken Jeong as Kyle
- Milana Vayntrub as Eliza
- Jay Pharoah as Neal
- Leslie Jones as Ally
- Jason Alexander
- Cheri Oteri as Janet
- Christopher Nicholas Smith as Mark
- Chris Gethard as Winston
- Emily Pendergast as Margie
- Oscar Nuñez as X Fernandez
- Paul F. Tompkins as Mr. Donahue

== Production ==
Principal photography began on March 22, 2022 and concluded on April 15, 2022.

== Reception ==
=== Ratings ===
During its premiere on September 5, 2022, in the 8:00 pm time slot, Out of Office attracted a total of 330,000 viewers, with a 0.15 rating for people aged 18–49. The film performed better than Comedy Central's two previous original films A Clüsterfünke Christmas and Hot Mess Holiday, and it was the best performance since Comedy Central started making original television films again in 2020.

On the review aggregator website Rotten Tomatoes, 50% of 4 critics' reviews are positive.

Common Sense Media rated the film 3 out of 5 stars.
