= Bob Stephenson (actor) =

American actor

- Born: Robert J. Stephenson; May 18, 1967 (age 59); Oxnard, California, U.S.
- Education: University of California at Santa Barbara
- Occupations: Actor; producer; screenwriter
- Years active: 1995–present

Robert J. Stephenson (born May 18, 1967) is an American film and television actor, film producer and screenwriter who is best known as Sheriff Jimmy Taylor on the CBS TV series Jericho.

== Life ==
Stephenson was born in Oxnard, California. He attended college at University of California at Santa Barbara. He starred as a lazy man in the video for the song "Lazy" by English music group X-Press 2 sung by the American singer David Byrne of Talking Heads, which reached number 2 in the United Kingdom, number 1 on the U.S. Dance Charts and number 1 in Syria in 2002. Along with fellow actor and good friend Tom Hanks he shares a love of the English Premier League team Aston Villa.

== Filmography ==
=== Actor ===
Year	Title	Role	Notes
1995	Seven	Cop on SWAT Team	
1997	Con Air	Ted, Pilot	
1997	The Game	Assassin Kartmann	
1998	Two of a Kind	Frankenstein	Episode: "Nightmare on Carrie's Street"
1998	Kelly Watch the Stars	Ping-pong referee	Music video
1998	Felicity	Officer Dennis	Episode: "Drawing the Line: Part 2"
1999	Sleeping Beauties	Record Executive	Short
1999	Fight Club	Airport Security Officer	
1999	Veronica's Closet	Fred	Episode: "Veronica's June Swoon"
1999	Profiler	Phil Mazzotta	Episode: "Original Sin"
2000	Architecture of Reassurance	Suburban Man	Short
2000	Charlie's Angels	Red Star Systems Director	
2001	Judging Amy	Mr. Dimeola	Episode: "The Undertow"
2002	Ally McBeal	Peter	Episode: "Tom Dooley"
2002	Lazy	Lazy Man	Music video
2002	Adaptation	David	
2003	Dragnet	Clerk	Episode: "The Cutting of the Swath"
2003	Charlie's Angels: Full Throttle	Crazed Fan	
2004	Breakin' All the Rules	Ticket Master	
2004	Catalina View	Frank	Short
2005	Thumbsucker	Debate Official	
2005	The Big Empty	Doctor #1	Short
2006	Friends with Money	Marty	
2006	Close to Home	Michael Brandt	Episode: "Reasonable Doubts"
2006	CSI: Crime Scene Investigation	Super	Episode: "Way to Go"
2006	The Minor Accomplishments of Jackie Woodman	Branchard Massit	Episode: "Nemesisyphus"
2006	School for Scoundrels	Classmate	
2006	The Ex	Doug	
2006–2008	Jericho	Jimmy Taylor	24 episodes
2007	Zodiac	Zodiac 3	
2007	Day 73 with Sarah	Tom	Short
2007	Transformers	Xbox Guy	
2008	Without a Trace	Sean Hall	Episode: "Last Call"
2009	Eleventh Hour	Daniel Harris	Episode: "Miracle"
2009	Logorama	Ronald McDonald / Michelin Man Police Officer Mike	Short, Voice
2009	Stolen Lives	Mike the Bartender	
2009	The Janky Promoters	Cameraman	
2009	The Patient	Bob	Short
2009–2010	The Forgotten	Walter Bailey	17 episodes
2010	$#*! My Dad Says	Steve	Episode: "Not Without My Jacket"
2011	Our Idiot Brother	Officer Washburn	
2011	Larry Crowne	Andrews	
2011	Hick	Lux	
2011	Division III: Football's Finest	Coach Ervin	
2011	Last Man Standing	Marvin	Episode: "Home Security"
2012	Seeking a Friend for the End of the World	Officer Wally Johnson	
2013	Vegas	Fred LaForge	Episode: "Paiutes"
2013	Full Circle	Sidney Waverly	
2013	Bad Words	Bill Murhoff	
2013	Agents of S.H.I.E.L.D.	Gary	Episode: "Pilot"
2014	Mom	Edward	Episode: "Fireballs and Bullet Holes"
2016	Nerdland	Friendly Cop / Confused Guy #1	Voice
2016	Why Him?	Jerry in Graphics	
2016	11.22.63	Silent Mike	Episode: "Other Voices, Other Rooms"
2017	Twin Peaks	Frank	Episode: "Part 5"
2017	We Love You, Sally Carmichael!	Dave Sinnott	
2017	Lady Bird	Father Walther	
2017	Battle of the Sexes	Sugar Daddy PR Guy	
2017	El Camino Christmas	Dennis the Dental Hygenist	
2018	A Futile and Stupid Gesture	Construction Worker	
2018	Making Babies	Gordon	
2018	Vice	Rush Limbaugh	
2019	Brooklyn Nine-Nine	Janitor Randy	Episode: "The Bimbo"
2019	Lying and Stealing	Mr. Oklahoma	
2019	Adam Ruins Everything	Dominic's Uncle	Episode: "Adam Ruins Cops"
2020	Cowboys	Sheriff George Jenkins	
2021	The Chair	IT Support Technician	
2021	Ultrasound	Art	
2022	Top Gun: Maverick	Senior Engineer	
2023	Scavengers Reign	Sam (voice)	
2025	Common Side Effects	Connor / Samurai (voice)	2 episodes

=== Producer ===
- The Dangerous Lives of Altar Boys (2002)
- Thumbsucker (2005)

=== Screenwriter ===
- Southlander (2001)
