= Scavengers Reign =

2023 American animated series

- Genre: Adventure; Drama; Science fiction; Horror
- Created by: Joe Bennett; Charles Huettner
- Starring: Sunita Mani; Wunmi Mosaku; Alia Shawkat; Bob Stephenson; Ted Travelstead
- Composer: Nicolas Snyder
- Country of origin: United States
- Original language: English
- No. of seasons: 1
- No. of episodes: 12

Production
- Executive producers: Joe Bennett; Charles Huettner; Chris Prynoski; Ben Kalina; Antonio Canobbio; Sean Buckelew; James Merrill
- Editor: Jason Klein
- Running time: 23–27 minutes
- Production companies: Titmouse, Inc.; Green Street Pictures

Original release
- Network: Max
- Release: October 19 – November 9, 2023

Scavengers Reign is an American adult animated science fiction television series created by Joe Bennett and Charles Huettner for the streaming service Max, based on their 2016 short film Scavengers.

Max announced the series in June 2022 and it premiered on October 19, 2023. The show received critical acclaim for the acting, plot, animation, and atmosphere. In May 2024, the series was canceled after one season and acquired by Netflix, which also decided not to renew it.

The series made its linear television debut on Adult Swim's Toonami programming block on September 6, 2026, as part of a month-long event where it airs under the same schedule of three episodes per week as its original release on Max.

== Synopsis ==
The series follows the survivors of the damaged interstellar cargo ship Demeter 227 who are stranded on Vesta, an alien planet bustling with flora and fauna but filled with dangers. Initially the survivors are separated into three groups: commander Sam and horticulturalist Ursula, cargo specialist Azi and her robot companion Levi, and the isolated crewman Kamen, who travels with a telepathic creature named Hollow. Local life displays unusual complexity, symbiotic levels and extraordinary life cycles. Usual borders between plants, animal, intelligence and highly organized life are unclear. Over time, the survivors' paths converge towards the crash-landed Demeter.

== Voice cast and characters ==
=== Main ===
- Sunita Mani as Ursula, a crewmember in the Demeter's horticulture lab; stranded on Vesta with Sam.
- Wunmi Mosaku as Azi Narine, a cargo specialist on the Demeter; stranded on Vesta with Levi.
- Alia Shawkat as Levi, a robot from the Demeter; stranded on Vesta with Azi.
  - Shawkat also plays Fiona, the Demeter's robotics engineer, who is Kamen's estranged wife.
- Bob Stephenson as Sam, commander of the Demeter; stranded on Vesta with Ursula.
- Ted Travelstead as Kamen, a crewmember on the Demeter who is struggling in his career and in his marriage with his wife Fiona; while stranded on Vesta he forms a bond with Hollow, a telepathic and telekinetic creature. Co-creator Bennett stated that Kamen's presence has "introduced human greed and gluttony into this animal kingdom," which causes Hollow to become more sinister.

=== Guest ===
- Chris Diamantopoulos as a station tech on another Demeter ship.
- Okieriete Onaodowan as a station chief on another Demeter ship.
- Sepideh Moafi as Mia, a passenger on the Demeter who forms a romantic connection with Azi.
- Skyler Gisondo as Charlie, a passenger in cryofreeze on the Demeter.
- Pollyanna McIntosh as Kris, the leader of a scavenger group from another planet; intends to loot the Demeter.
- Freddy Rodriguez as Terrence, a member of Kris's scavenger group.
- Dash Williams as Barry, the youngest and least experienced member of Kris's scavenger group.
- Masha King as Mascha, a healer that Ursula and Sam meet in their travels on Vesta; part of a group that was stranded on Vesta many years prior.
- James Kyson as John, Mascha's husband.

== Episodes ==
No.	Title	Directed by	Written by	Original release date	Adult Swim air date
1	"The Signal"	Joseph Bennett & Charles Huettner	Joseph Bennett, Charles Huettner, Sean Buckelew & James Merrill	October 19, 2023	September 6, 2026
An interstellar ship named the Demeter 227, carrying cargo and colonists, is heavily damaged after an unspecified incident. The crew launch escape pods to the surface of the nearby planet Vesta, but most burn up during reentry. A pair of survivors, Sam and Ursula, try to contact the Demeter, still in orbit, but they need a battery from another pod and Ursula nearly dies while retrieving it. Elsewhere, survivor Azi has been growing crops with help from robot Levi, who is exhibiting perplexing behavior from a strange, yellow goo coating its internals. Hostile wildlife destroy their homestead and heavily damage Levi. Another survivor, Kamen, is trapped and losing his mind after his escape pod becomes entangled in tree branches. He is freed by a creature with telekinetic and telepathic abilities named Hollow, and it guides him away using visions of his estranged wife, Fiona. Sam and Ursula remotely execute the Demeter 227's emergency landing protocol. The various survivors see it descending through the atmosphere as it lands on the planet.
2	"The Storm"	Jonathan Djob Nkondo	Joseph Bennett, Charles Huettner & Sean Buckelew	October 19, 2023	September 6, 2026
Sam and Ursula set out to find the ship, hoping that the crew members in cryostasis have survived and that the Demeter is still operational. A flashback shows Azi's life on the ship, where she receives romantic interest from Mia, another crew member. In the present, Azi and Levi depart to find the landed ship. Azi discovers that the yellow goo is integrating with the mechanical components of Levi's body, who is experiencing compulsions to wander around and cultivate the local fauna. Kamen is under the influence of Hollow, who uses telepathic visions of Fiona, to direct him. A storm that rains sharp crystals approaches, forcing the survivors to find shelter. Ursula and Sam find safety in the protective egg sac of a large aquatic creature but must fight a parasitic arachnid to survive. They manage to kill it, though Sam is wounded in the process. Kamen almost gets sucked into the storm when he is taken to Hollow and its colony's cave. Azi and Levi find refuge in a massive garden in a gigantic tree stump that Levi has secretly been cultivating.
3	"The Wall"	Vincent Tsui	Joseph Bennett, Charles Huettner & Sean Buckelew	October 19, 2023	September 6, 2026
Ursula and Sam's journey takes them through an underground forest. They reach a large, dense wall of branches that blocks their progress. They use a seashell-like object to spread the branches open into a path, but it soon begins closing behind them. While running, Ursula stops to observe a small blue creature inside a flower, but Sam is upset that they became separated. While arguing, he is suddenly snatched and carried away by a predator. Levi continues to exhibit increasingly independent behavior, and Azi's concern grows. Levi's seemingly intuitive understanding of nature saves them during a stampede of buffalo-like animals. Kamen is manipulated into bringing Hollow food, hunting and killing animals for it. Hollow begins consuming meat, quickly growing much larger and stronger. In a flashback, on board the Demeter, Azi tells Kamen that a coolant leak has damaged some of their mining equipment, and would destroy the rest of it before they reach the colony if they stay on their current course.
4	"The Dream"	Rachel Reid	Sean Buckelew	October 26, 2023	September 13, 2026
Azi attempts to remove Levi's yellow goo. While doing so she is incapacitated and attacked by a predator, but is saved by Levi. Azi learns that Levi can now sense touch and pain, and refuses to be shut down again. Ursula mimics the behavior of wildlife to find Sam. She finds him near a crashed escape pod, where they bury the crew that died from the storm's crystal rain. Kamen uses traps to continue sourcing food for Hollow, who has grown larger and more demanding. Hollow expresses displeasure after Kamen fails a hunt. Kamen begins crafting weapons. A flashback reveals that in an effort to preserve their mining equipment, Kamen rerouted the ship to a faster but riskier flight path against Sam's orders, inadvertently causing the Demeter to be severely damaged by a solar flare.
5	"The Demeter"	Christine Jie-Eun Shin	Jenny Deiker Restivo	October 26, 2023	September 13, 2026
Local wildlife infiltrates the damaged Demeter and begins preying on passengers trapped in cryosleep. Charlie, a young man in cryosleep, wakes up and narrowly escapes the ship, finding himself lost and dazed in the hostile alien landscape. After walking for days and being injured by the dangerous fauna, he runs into Kamen, but Hollow snaps Charlie's neck, and Kamen hallucinates Charlie's death as Fiona's death. It is shown that Fiona died when Kamen left her behind on the exploding Demeter. Kamen tries to leave to find Fiona, but Hollow telepathically reminds him that he is responsible for her death. In despair and guilt, Kamen begs for help and Hollow absorbs him into its own body, where he enters an unconscious, dreamlike state. Azi's wounds from being attacked have caused severe rashes across her body. She finds a solution in aquatic creatures that feed on the infection. She begins to respect Levi's new-found autonomy and personhood. While leaving the forest, Sam is bitten by an alien pod's spikes, which uses his blood to create a clone of him. Ursula notes that the area is littered with the dead bodies of many different animals.
6	"The Fall"	Diego Porral	James Merrill	October 26, 2023	September 13, 2026
The alien pod is shown releasing a clone of another animal, which tracks its original down and kills it, using the carcass to pollinate more pods. Sam hides his infected bite and teaches Ursula how to continue without him. Azi and Levi's bike runs out of power, so they use the bike's winch cable to cross a large canyon. Azi finally learns that Levi is now sentient and they sing a song together. When crossing the canyon, they are attacked by Hollow, who telekinetically rips Levi into pieces. Azi cuts Hollow and discovers Kamen inside, but Hollow quickly heals and throws her into the canyon. She sends out a distress call, which is picked up by humans on a nearby moon. When the clone of Sam catches up to them and attacks Ursula, she kills it with fire, but accidentally destroys their remaining supplies. Sam, now dying, gives Ursula his captain's credentials. An unknown woman arrives and leads them away.
7	"The Cure"	Jonathan Djob Nkondo	Charles Huettner	November 2, 2023	September 20, 2026
Azi's distress call is picked up by Barry, Kris, and Terrance, a trio of spacers who are motivated to respond only after realizing there may be loot for the taking. They land and compete in a hyperventilation competition to select their leader. Kris wins. While they are searching for Azi, Hollow destroys their spaceship, trapping them on the planet. The stranger who found Sam and Ursula takes them to her crash-landed ship and successfully treats Sam, with Ursula's help. The woman then vomits out a black seed, which she injects into Sam's chest while he is sleeping. Sam and Ursula run when the woman turns out to be controlled by a massive alien hiding in the ship. The alien almost kills Sam, but suddenly stops when it senses the seed in Sam's chest. Azi and the scavenger group return to find their spaceship destroyed.
8	"The Nest"	Vincent Tsui	Jillian Goldfluss	November 2, 2023	September 20, 2026
Azi and the scavengers decide to use the escape shuttle that they believe is still on the Demeter. Terrance is fatally mauled by hostile vegetation while trying to retrieve a gift for Barry, and Kris kills him to end his pain. Barry destroys Terrance's gift out of guilt. Elsewhere, Ursula is exhausted from walking, but Sam is bizarrely full of energy despite walking for hours. They take a break in the morning, and Ursula falls asleep. Sam demonstrates superhuman physical capabilities after his recovery. He then suddenly becomes hyper-focused on building a nest of clay inside a nearby cave. Ursula confronts him about his behavior, and they discover that Sam has been infected when he pulls away a flap of skin on his chest to reveal the larval form of the creature.
9	"The Mountain"	Rachel Reid	James Merrill	November 2, 2023	September 20, 2026
During a flashback, it is revealed that another group crash-landed on the planet decades prior, including the woman who helped Sam and Ursula. The woman's spouse became infected with the same heart parasite that afflicted Sam – she kills him in self-defense, but also becomes infected, days later. Before Ursula and Sam abandon the nest, Ursula forces Sam to tell more about his life to confirm that he isn't overtaken by the parasite, and he reveals he had a girlfriend before the Demeter's voyage. The duo reach a river at the bottom of a canyon, and decide to travel downstream using a creature's moulted shell as a makeshift boat. As they are being stalked by a pack of hostile creatures, they fall into the river when it ends in a whirlpool. Ursula is bitten in the leg by one of the creatures while underwater, but Sam kills it with a knife and drags her ashore. When Ursula wakes, she catches Sam trying to infect her with a black seed, and she confronts him. Azi, Barry, and Kris argue about their plans for the shuttle on the Demeter as they climb a mountain. Kris wants to load the shuttle with cargo, while Azi's priority is the surviving colonists still in cryosleep.
10	"The Decision"	Christine Jie-Eun Shin	Jenny Deiker Restivo	November 9, 2023	September 27, 2026
Various lifeforms gather Levi's parts and reassemble its body. In a flashback, Azi is drinking with Mia, and they end up kissing. Azi, Barry, and Kris cross a river by pole vaulting from rock to rock. Azi fashions an adhesive that they apply to their boots to avoid slipping off the rocks. Azi pushes Kris into the river in an attempt to force her to agree to wake up the crew of the Demeter, but Barry knocks Azi out by throwing a rock at her head. Azi is tied up and left behind. Kris rationalizes her action by saying that she didn't kill Azi and that whatever has to happen will happen. Sam and Ursula travel on the back of a large creature. Sam coughs out another infectious seed, but he throws it away and tells Ursula to get her knife out for self-defense, which she reluctantly does. They make it within sight of the Demeter, but Sam gives up and tears out the parasite, fatally wounding himself. As Barry and Kris, and Ursula, make their separate ways to the Demeter, Hollow reaches it first.
11	"The Return"	Diego Porral	James Merrill	November 9, 2023	September 27, 2026
A flashback shows how the yellow biological matter infiltrated Levi's body via a glowing flower shown numerous times that grows on dead matter. Ursula finds Levi, who is now made of different life-forms and is working with the local wildlife to grow a farm by an abandoned escape pod. Levi ignores a scream that leads Ursula to Azi. Ursula finds Azi struggling on the riverbank and cuts her free from Kris' bindings. Meanwhile, Kris and Barry explore the Demeter and decide to take the shuttle without waking up the passengers. They use explosives to blow a hole in the hangar door, but Hollow ambushes them while Kamen slowly begins to wake up. Kamen realizes he is trapped in a vision and demands to be released, with the explosion knocking him off the Demeter (in his vision) and sending him falling through the atmosphere, back to the planet Vesta.
12	"The Reunion"	Vincent Tsui	Sean Buckelew	November 9, 2023	September 27, 2026
Aboard the Demeter, Ursula begins the cryo wake-up process for the surviving crew, but is attacked by Hollow. Azi finds and subdues Kris, but lets her go to rescue Ursula. Azi could have killed Kris with her knife, but just like at the river she thinks she can establish dominance and achieve her goal without killing. Barry wants to help the Demeter's crew, so Kris betrays him and launches the shuttle alone, much to Azi's and Barry's horror. Azi is pursued by Hollow and almost forced to eat its hypnotic black goo, but she is saved by Levi, who now remembers her. Unleashing a mysterious power against Hollow, Levi overwhelms Hollow with visions depicting the evolution of life on Vesta. Levi's powers manage to save Azi and free Kamen, turning Hollow back to its original small form. After the survivors are awakened, time passes, and the survivors have built a colony around the ship. Azi has reunited with Mia, Levi has found a way to reproduce by using the glowing flowers, Ursula honors Sam's memory by wearing his clothes and putting his keycard in her notebook, and Kamen is mute, but has created a thriving garden of his own. Somewhere in space, Kris's shuttle is overrun with vegetation, and she is dying from thirst. A massive spaceship pulls the shuttle onboard, and masked robed figures with bandaged feet enter the shuttle. The figures find a baby Levi that had found its way onto the shuttle when Kris allowed Barry to take one of the glowing flowers.

== Production ==
Joe Bennett and Charles Huettner created the original 2016 Scavengers short film for Adult Swim, where it aired as part of the Toonami programming block and later made available on Huettner's YouTube channel. The eight-minute animated short, with backgrounds inspired by Moebius, contains no dialog and depicts a pair of humans engaging in an intricate series of interactions, like a Rube Goldberg machine, with the planet's lifeforms. From 2018 to 2019, Bennett and Huettner expanded the concept into a series pilot that did not go forward at Adult Swim, though the show was later picked up by HBO Max. The 12-episode series was produced over two years by Titmouse, Inc. and Green Street Pictures with a crew including international animators working remotely from locations including Mexico, Spain, Portugal and France.

In May 2024, the series was canceled by Max after one season. Netflix acquired the series, which was released on the platform on May 31 in the United States, United Kingdom, Ireland, and New Zealand. Netflix reportedly considered renewing the series, but in November 2024, Bennett confirmed that this would not be the case. He also released a trailer on his social media that showcased what was planned for the second season had it been produced.

== Release ==
Max announced the series in June 2022 and it premiered on October 19, 2023. Three episodes were released weekly until November 9, 2023.

== Reception ==
The series has received critical acclaim. On review aggregator website Rotten Tomatoes, the series has a 100% approval score with an average rating of 8.7/10, based on 22 critic reviews. The website's critics consensus reads, "Disturbing and wondrous, Scavengers Reign presents a vividly realized world that beckons exploration by its marooned characters and television viewers alike." James Poniewozik of The New York Times called it "a lush, magnificent, hypnotic story of human survival in a place that feels, in a way that sci-fi planets only occasionally manage, truly otherworldly." Andrew Webster of The Verge deemed it to be "equal parts beautiful and brutal, and it might be the most original piece of science fiction of the year", and compared the art style to Jean "Moebius" Giraud."

For the 76th Primetime Creative Arts Emmy Awards, the series was nominated for Outstanding Animated Program and won an Outstanding Individual Achievement in Animation for background design.
