= Steve Hely =

American writer

Steve Hely is an American writer who is the co-creator of Adult Swim's Common Side Effects in February 2025.

Hely has written for the television shows Late Show with David Letterman (receiving an Emmy nomination for Outstanding Writing for a Variety or Comedy Show), Last Call with Carson Daly (where he also served as an associate producer), American Dad!, 30 Rock, and The Office.

Hely has also authored or co-authored three books. The Ridiculous Race, written with Vali Chandrasekaran and published in 2008 by Macmillan, chronicled a real-life race around the world between Hely and Chandrasekaran. Each set off from Los Angeles in opposite directions, with only one rule: "No airplanes." In 2009, Grove/Atlantic published Hely's debut novel, How I Became a Famous Novelist. Hely subsequently won the 2010 Thurber Prize for American Humor for the novel. In 2016 he published The Wonder Trail, about a trip from Los Angeles to the southern tip of South America.

Hely is the co-host of The Great Debates, a weekly podcast in which he debates the great issues of the day with David King. Hely often takes the pro, or more life-affirming stance.

Hely attended the Roxbury Latin School and Harvard University, where he received a Bachelor of Arts degree. While at Harvard, Hely served two terms as president of the Harvard Lampoon.

== Television appearances ==
Hely has appeared onscreen in both 30 Rock and The Office. He appeared as a poster-collecting bachelor named Jerem in the 30 Rock episode "Lee Marvin vs. Derek Jeter". Additionally, he appeared as a flautist and shirtless bohemian in The Office episode "Gettysburg".
