= Strange Hill High =

British children's television series

- Genre: Animated series Mystery fiction Fantasy; Adventure; Science-fiction; Comedy
- Created by: Yoshimi & Katoi; Josh Weinstein
- Written by: Josh Weinstein; Jason Hazeley; Joel Morris; Mark Oswin; James Griffiths; Andrew Burrell; Bede Blake; Ben Teasdale; Emma Kennedy; Reid Harrison; Kirstie Falkous; Stuart Kenworthy
- Directed by: Geoff Walker; Chris Tichborne
- Starring: Ben Bailey Smith; Emma Kennedy; Richard Ayoade; Jonathan Keeble; John Thomson; Caroline Aherne; Marc Silk; Melissa Sinden; Matt King; Chris Johnson
- Composers: Paul Lovatt-Cooper; Richie Webb & Matt Katz
- Country of origin: United Kingdom
- Original language: English
- No. of series: 2
- No. of episodes: 26

Production
- Executive producers: Bob Higgins; Sander Schwartz; Sarah Muller; Kat Van Henderson
- Producers: Phil Chalk; Andrew Burrell
- Running time: 22 minutes
- Production companies: Factory; FremantleMedia Enterprises; CBBC

Original release
- Network: CBBC
- Release: May 8, 2013 – December 15, 2014

Strange Hill High is a British children's puppet-animated television series for CBBC. The show is a co-production between CBBC, FremantleMedia and Factory.

Out of the many writers, it was noted that Josh Weinstein (who worked on The Simpsons, Futurama and Disenchantment) would be involved in the series, with its visuals created using an animation technique combining puppets, Japanese vinyl toys and digital effects. The show continued to air reruns until 2020.

== Premise ==
Strange Hill High mainly follows a group of three diverse students: Mitchell Tanner, an African-Caribbean-British pupil with attention deficit hyperactivity disorder who comes up with plans to resolve various conflicts, while avoiding studying for tests; Becky Butters, a conscientious schoolgirl who tries her best to get out of whatever problems she gets involved in; and the sometimes dull and robotic Templeton, who comes up with bizarre quips and interpretations, as they explore their extraordinary school, uncovering absurd and outrageous occurrences as they go.

The students meet a variety of people involved in the oddities of their school, but have to be wary of some of the students and faculty members - mainly Mr. Abercrombie, who is easily angered by any disturbance.

== Cast ==
- Ben Bailey Smith as Mitchell Tanner, one of the main protagonists and a quick-witted boy. He is an avid rule breaker and hates the authority of the teachers. His attempts to break the rules and get out of schoolwork often cause the strange events he and his friends get into trouble. /Bishop, a boy who dresses up and talks like a gangster.
- Emma Kennedy as Rebecca "Becky" Butters, one of the main protagonists who is often the voice of reason. She is conscientious, positive and always tries to do the right thing and follow the rules.
- Richard Ayoade as Templeton, one of the main protagonists and a self-proclaimed “genius”. He is very eccentric and somewhat robotic.
- Caroline Aherne as Stephanie Bethany, a rather mean girl and a lover of fashion.

== Episodes ==
=== Series overview ===
Series	Episodes	Originally released	
Series	Episodes	First released	Last released
1	13	8 May 2013	31 July 2013
2	13	29 April 2014	15 December 2014

=== Series 1 (2013) ===
No.	Title	Written by	Original release date
1	"King Mitchell"	Mark Oswin; James Griffiths	8 May 2013
Mitchell discovers an ancient toilet behind the walls of the school bathroom where a knight resides. He decides to take advantage of the guardian's values to treat him like a servant. It is revealed that the toilet behind the wall actually contains a tentacle monster made up of all of the sewage underneath Britain which proceeds to attack Tyson and co. when they attempt to seize its power. The monster is defeated by Mitchell and never returns again.: Note: This episode is dedicated in memory of Gerry Anderson.
2	"99 Cool Things to do with a Time Machine"	Ben Teasdale	15 May 2013
Mitchell discovers the school clock is actually a time machine in his determination to arrive on school at time and cheat in all of his exams. He uses this power for his own indulgence before his continuous manipulation ends up causing lethal consequences and the destruction of reality. Going back in time, Mitchell stops his past self from committing his initial time reversal before returning everything back to normal. Templeton is accidentally hit by the destroyed clock face following the chaos.
3	"The Lost and Found Boy"	Josh Weinstein	22 May 2013
An enthusiastic boy named Peter Dustpan traps the trio in the lost and found room because he is lonely. The trio trick Peter into leaving the room which is revealed to connect to Mitchell's locker, hence Mitchell being blamed for Peter's thievery, and Peter finds his father outside of the school entrance gates. With their reunion, the two of them leave the school grounds together.
4	"Snoozical"	Reid Harrison	29 May 2013
Becky's tonal insecurities develop into a manifestation of her degrading music teacher Miss Grackle, who she imagines as a monstrous form known as The Grackle that antagonizes her in a dream. Becky decides to attend the auditions for the musical currently occurring and defeats The Grackle, who followed her out of her consciousness, by singing harmoniously in front of the school.
5	"Big Mouth Strikes Again"	Mark Oswin; James Griffiths	5 June 2013
The cook at Strange Hill High, who is actually the tooth fairy in disguise, forces the school to eat a sugar-only diet so he can steal everyone's teeth for a mouth-themed xylophone. The tooth fairy kidnaps the trio when they interfere with his plans and drags them to his lair. The xylophone becomes sentient and ravenously attempts to eat everyone it encounters before it is defeated by a sugar overload.: Note: The episode title is a reference to the song by The Smiths.
6	"The Most Boring Book In The World"	Ben Teasdale	12 June 2013
Becky and Templeton are transported into a book that teleports people inside through sheer boredom. They discover the book was actually written by Mr. Balding who is several hundred years old. While inside of the book, they encourage the students to remain safe from a storm which is actually Mitchell opening up another portal to save his friends.
7	"Read All About It"	Stuart Kenworthy	19 June 2013
Mitchell and his friends write news stories for the school paper in order to get tickets to see their favorite rapper in concert. However, something extraordinary happens and it leaves them having to put back the pieces.
8	"Health & Safety"	Emma Kennedy	26 June 2013
Mitchell, Becky, and Templeton are forced to watch a horrible old school safety film from the 1970's during School Safety Week, when suddenly they find themselves trapped in the film itself.
9	"The Ghost Writers of Strange Hill High"	Jason Hazeley; Joel Morris	3 July 2013
Looking for a place to hide and avoid his teachers after not doing his assignments, Mitchell stumbles on an unused classroom - a room that looks like it hasn't been used for 100 years.
10	"Teacher's Pet"	Mark Oswin; James Griffiths	10 July 2013
When the trio gets tossed into detention on a snowy day, they're put in charge of cleaning the old and cramped Science Room. While cleaning, they discover a device that soon takes things out of proportion.
11	"Lucky Becky"	Kirstie Falkous	17 July 2013
Becky wants to join the cheerleading squad but is stopped by the stuck-up cheerleaders. Instead, they allow her to become the team mascot, which in turn brings them all good luck, whether it's winning a game or scoring well on a test. But soon she discovers that with every piece of good luck, comes a piece of bad luck.
12	"Becky vs Bocky"	Jason Hazeley; Joel Morris	24 July 2013
Election Day is coming and it's Becky's perfect chance to win and gain the popularity she's always wanted. But with competition at her doorstep, one creative idea from Mitchell gives her the competitive edge. But will it go as planned?
13	"The End Of Terminator"	Josh Weinstein	31 July 2013
Strange Hill High's computers are hopelessly out of date - breaking down, going up in smoke, and simply falling apart. But with the new technology at the school, it seems all too perfect and it's up to Mitchell and his friends to find out what's behind the changes.

=== Series 2 (2014) ===
No.	Title	Written by	Original release date
1	"The Curse of the Were-Teacher"	Josh Weinstein	29 April 2014
Mitchell is bitten by a rabid Deputy Head and, every time the school bell rings, transforms into the disciplinarian were-teacher, Mr. Tanner. If the curse isn't lifted before Mr. Tanner signs a permanent contract, Mitchell could be doomed to spend the rest of his life as a teacher at Strange Hill.
2	"Invasion of the Templetons"	Andrew Burrell	6 May 2014
When Templeton's Science Fair attempt to blast into the cosmos backfires, he accidentally instigates a full-blown alien invasion - by aliens that seem remarkably familiar and have come to pay homage to the creator of the Universe, Templeton.
3	"The 101% Solution"	Mark Oswin; James Griffiths	13 May 2014
Mitchell must pass the 'Hardest Maths Assignment Ever'. He cheats and ends up earning the mythical grade of 101%, breaking maths and the world as we know it in the process.
4	"Little School of Horrors"	Bede Blake	20 May 2014
When Becky coaxes a wilting plant back to life in the old Strange Hill Greenhouse, she gets more than she bargained for with an outbreak of plantlike PE teachers threatening to exercise the world into submission. Only Mitchell's sarcastically planted chicken nugget beast can save the day.
5	"Big Templeton is Watching You!"	Jason Hazeley; Joel Morris	27 May 2014
A new school security system is installed - and the cameras seem to record what happens in the future. When Templeton becomes Security Monitor and goes mad with this incredible, all-seeing power, the very existence of Strange Hill is threatened.
6	"Crushing Embarrassment"	Jason Hazeley; Joel Morris	3 June 2014
It's Aprils Fool's day and Mitchell is pranking in overdrive. Before too long he's pranked everyone and unleashed a dormant beast of Embarrassment that lives under the school. Mitchell must save his friends - and Tyson - from 'The Embarrassment's' disgusting lair by going toe to toe in a shameful game show.
7	"Mitchell Who?"	Mark Oswin; James Griffiths	10 June 2014
Mitchell accidentally erases himself from history after deleting his school record. At first his anonymity is fun but when his friends forget him and he starts to disappear, he calls on Samia, the one person who can remember him, to help reboot his existence.
8	"Innercrombie"	Andrew Burrell	17 June 2014
It's Valentine's Day and whilst attempting to sabotage Abercombie's zero tolerance to romance, our trio discover a portal to the inside the Head's head! What at first seems like the best thing ever soon turns into a nightmare as the bullies gain control of the Headmaster. The only way to stop them is to test the old adage: the heart rules the head.
9	"Ken Kong"	Stuart Kenworthy	24 June 2014
During a swimming test in the middle of winter in the dreaded Strange Hill swimming pool, the kids discover a mysterious paradise island in the middle of the pool. They also soon discover the isle's longtime sole inhabitant, a mysteriously huge exchange student named Ken Kong. When Ken returns to the school with our kids, it throws Abercrombie into a panic.
10	"Mitchell Junior"	Emma Kennedy	1 July 2014
When Mitchell is issued a strange simulation baby doll to teach him responsibility, his first reaction is to bin it. Freakishly it keeps coming back and he soon realizes it's alive! From apathy, to panic to parenthood, Mitchell soon appreciates that having Mitchell Junior around might not be so bad after all.
11	"The MCDXX Men"	Mark Oswin; James Griffiths	8 July 2014
Mitchell, Becky and Templeton stumble across an underground lair that was home to a league of medieval superheroes - Ye Olde Righteousness League. When the League's evil arch nemesis escapes his confinement and possesses Abercrombie, our trio find themselves (and their classmates) transformed into these heroes to fight his tyranny.
12	"The Snide Piper"	Ben Bailey-Smith	15 July 2014
The Annual Strange Hill Festival is approaching. Not staying quiet about his dislike of folk music, Mitchell drives Miss Grackle mad - and perhaps to an early retirement - and the kids get a mysterious and oddly nice new music teacher who may have a much deeper connection to the ancient Spring Festival than anyone realized. Guest star: Alison Moyet as Miss Joy
13	"A Strange Hill Christmas"	Josh Weinstein	15 December 2014
Mitchell's desperate attempt to start his Christmas holiday early is scuppered when he accidentally traps everyone in the freezing school. Note: Postman Pat makes a brief cameo in the episode.

== Ratings ==
Episode ratings from BARB.

Episode No.	Airdate	Viewers	CBBC Weekly Ranking
1	8 May 2013	Under 244,000	Outside Top 10
2	15 May 2013	298,000	8
3	22 May 2013	360,000	3
4	29 May 2013	317,000	6
5	5 June 2013	Under 205,000	Outside Top 10
6	12 June 2013	Under 248,000	Outside Top 10
7	19 June 2013	224,000	10
8	26 June 2013	283,000	4
9	3 July 2013	Under 198,000	Outside Top 10
10	10 July 2013	294,000	2
11	17 July 2013	Under 262,000	Outside Top 10
12	24 July 2013	Under 212,000	Outside Top 10
13	31 July 2013	278,000	6

== App game ==
An app game titled Merchant of Menace was released for iOS and Android in 2014, though it could also be played online.

== Awards and nominations ==
Awards
Award	Category	Result
67th British Academy Film Awards	Best Animated Series	Nominated
Kidscreen Awards	Best Animated Series	Won
British Academy Children's Awards	Animation	Nominated

== See also ==
- Grange Hill – unrelated 1978–2008 British television children's drama series that also takes place at a school
- Strange Hill – unrelated British comic strip with a similar name that also takes place at a school
