= Kulvinder Ghir =

British actor

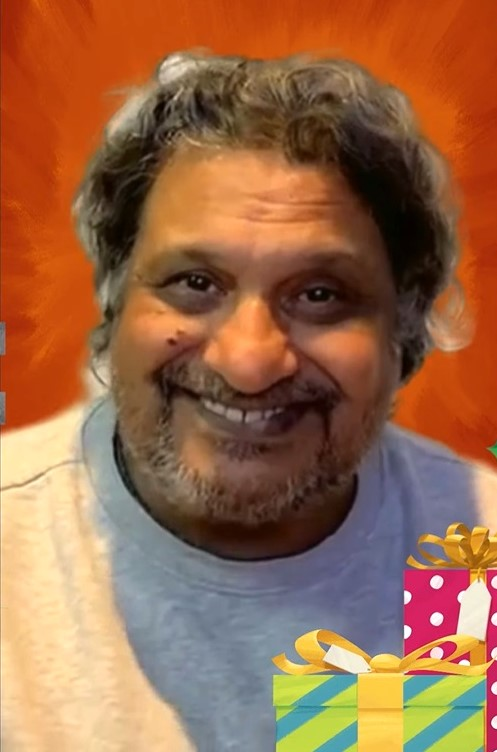
- Ghir in 2023
- Born: Nairobi, Kenya
- Occupations: Actor, comedian, writer
- Years active: 1980–present
- Spouse: Blandine Martin
- Children: 2

Kulvinder Ghir is a British actor, comedian and writer. He is best known as one of the cast members in the sketch show Goodness Gracious Me (1998–2015). He is also known for playing Aslam in the Yorkshire-based film Rita, Sue and Bob Too! (1987), and Poly Verisof in Foundation.

== Early life ==
Ghir was born in Nairobi, Kenya to Indian Punjabi parents of Sikh heritage. Ghir grew up in the Chapeltown suburb of Leeds, England. Ghir first began performing on stage at 13, going on to play comedy clubs between 15 and 17, thereafter enrolling in a London drama school.

== Career ==
Ghir made his first television appearance as a teenager in 1981 on the Yorkshire Television programme The Extraordinary People Show. At the time, he was looking at going into animation, and was one of three teenagers chosen to question Gerry Anderson about his techniques, and for general advice.

His next TV appearance was in 1985, in the recurring role of Davy Malik in the BBC drama Howards' Way. His breakthrough role came in 1987, in the controversial British film Rita, Sue and Bob Too. Since then, he has worked extensively in film, television and theatre.

He is best known as being one of four regular cast members in the BBC sketch comedy Goodness Gracious Me, in both its radio and TV incarnation. Amongst the many characters Ghir played were "Chunky Lafunga", a sexy Bollywood "hero", the superhero Bhangra Man, and as one half of the "Bhangramuffins" duo (alongside series co-writer Sanjeev Bhaskar).

He is also known for providing the voice of Ajay Bains in Postman Pat.

His play Dusky Warriors premiered at the Theatre Royal, Stratford, London, in 1995.

He also lent his voice to a few animated series aside from Postman Pat, including Chop Socky Chooks and the 2015 reboot of Bob the Builder.

In 2009, he was in the film 31 North 62 East as Tariq.

From September 2009 to May 2011, Ghir was part of the cast of BBC Three comedy series Lunch Monkeys, playing Mohammed Khan, father of Abdullah Afzal's character. The show lasted two series.

In 2013, he appeared as one of the feuding brothers in the film Jadoo. He also appeared in the final episode of the sitcom Big School, as Mr Rupesh the school bus driver. He also hosted the 2013 Brit Asia TV Music Awards. From 2013 to 2019, he played Cyril in Still Open All Hours.

In 2019, he played the protagonist's father in Blinded by the Light.

== Filmography ==
=== Film ===
Year	Title	Role	Notes
1987	Rita, Sue and Bob Too	Aslam	
1993	It's Your Choice: Interviewee Preparation	Interviewee #3	Short film; Direct-to-video
1993	Meetings Bloody Meetings		Short film
1995	Brothers in Trouble	Agent	
1999	The Comedy Trail: A Shaggy Dog Story	Dennis Cooper/Dinesh Kapoor	TV special
2002	Bend It Like Beckham	Teetu	
2002	Tomorrow La Scala!	Rajiv	
2003	Ice Cream Dream	Dad	Short film
2004	Lighthouse Hill	Raymonburr	
2004	Dead Cool	Doctor	
2006	Halal Harry	Ghoni	
2006	Nina's Heavenly Delights	TV Presenter	
2006	Van Wilder: The Rise of Taj	Taj's Father	
2007	Send in the Clowns	Dr Homayon	Short film
2008	Ealing Comedy	Alfie Singh	With Alistair McGowan
2008	A Distant Mirage	Katar Singh	
2009	31 North 62 East	Tariq Malim	
2009	Peter Kay's Animated All-Star Band	Ajay (voice)	Short film; direct-to-video
2009	King Jeff	Mr Zaheer	Short film
2010	The Arbor	Rafee	Documentary film
2011	Up There	Ali	
2011	Mumbai Charlie	The Doctor	Short film
2019	The Queen's Corgi	Sanjay (voice)	UK version
2019	Blinded by the Light	Malik	

=== Television ===
Year	Title	Role	Notes
1981	The Extraordinary People Show	Self/Participant	Questioned Gerry Anderson about his techniques
1985	Tucker's Luck	Sumil	Episodes: "Bookends/Vanished" and "Phased Out & Washed Up"
1985–1986	Howards' Way	Davy Malik	18 episodes
1988	Screen Two	Sunil	Episode: "Lucky Sunil"
1990	Casualty	Jeevan	Episode: "Remembrance"
1991	Waterfront Beat	PC Ashir Malek	4 episodes
1991	G.B.H.	Ravi	Television miniseries Episodes: "Message Received" and "Over and Out"
1991	Crimewatch File	Idris Ali	Episode: "A Party to Murder"
1992	Northern Crescent		Television movie
1992	Crime Story	Nizam Hosein	Episode: "Gone Too Far: The Mystery of Mrs. Muriel McKay"
1998–2015	Goodness Gracious Me	Various roles	21 episodes
2000	At Home with the Braithwaites	Manjit Mathura	2 episodes
2000	The Strangerers	Keith	Episode: "Angels"
2000–2002	Holby City	Anil Banerjee	10 episodes
2004–2017	Postman Pat	Multiple characters	158 episodes
2007–2008	Chop Socky Chooks	Additional Voices	17 episodes
2008–2011	Lunch Monkeys	Mohammed Khan	3 episodes
2011	Psychoville	Mr Kakkar	Episode: "Hancock"
2011	Comedy Lab	Latte aka The Daddy	Episode: "Kabadasses"
2013–2019	Still Open All Hours	Cyril	Series Regular
2015–2017	Bob the Builder	Anish Bose (voice)	6 episodes; UK and US versions
2018–2020	Thomas & Friends	Various Indian Voices (voice)	UK and US versions
2019	Delicious	Mohan	Episode: "Do What Feels Right"
2019	Beecham House	Mool Chand	6 episodes
2019	Lala's Ladiez	Lala	Unknown episodes
2020	Black Narcissus	General Toda Rai	2 episodes
2020	Hilda	Additional voices (voice)	13 episodes
2023	Foundation	Poly Verisof	8 episodes
2023	Call the Midwife	Kulvir Sharma	Christmas Special
2025	Virdee	Ranjit Virdee	6 episodes

== See also ==
- List of British Sikhs
