= List of Sherlock Yack characters =

This is a list of characters from Sherlock Yack.

== Characters in the zoo ==
=== Main characters ===
- Sherlock Yack: Sherlock is the zoo detective who solves cases. Unlike Sherlock Holmes, he is a yak, and is terrible at playing bagpipes. He was once a student in a Shaolin-like Buddhist monastery led by an ancient vulture called the Ball of Purity, and took time to pass his test.
- Hermione: A young female stoat and Sherlock's apprentice. She helps him to find clues, suspects, and proofs. She doesn't like bagpipes, especially when Sherlock plays them, and she sometimes replaces Sherlock like answering the call and finding the culprit. According to Sherlock, she is the daughter of a friend of his.

=== Recurring Characters ===
- Ball of Purity: is a very old vulture and was Sherlock's trainer before he became a detective. He trained Sherlock very hard until he was fully trained during his flashbacks.
- Doctor Beaky: A scientific shoebill who only makes his words simple if some animals do not understand, which almost always occurs whenever an animal is injured and either Sherlock Yack or Hermione ask him what's wrong with the injured animal.
- Babette: A heron who is Hermione's aunt and a dogga who appeared in "Who Robbed The Crane?".

=== Zoo Animals (suspects, victims and culprits) ===
- Seal: He enjoys playing water ball, ring toss, is very well-dressed, and cheats at cards.
- Turtle: An old female turtle who walks very slowly.
- Piranha: A turquoise piranha fish who eats anything that he sees, and requires a fish bowl to move around when outside his enclosure. He also catcalls all females passing by his tank.
- Pelican: A pelican who appeared in "Who Robbed the Seal?", "Who Wants to Fry the Piranha?", "Who Broke the Crane's Voice?", "Who Robbed the Tapir?", "Who Knotted Up the Octopus?" "Who Made Stork Fart?", and "Who Sunk the Pelican?". He claims to have sailed the seven seas and that he is not a pirate. He also works at the practical jokes store.
- Bird of Paradise: A painter who only paints portraits of himself.
- Hyena: A hyena art student who appeared in "Who Tagged The Bird of Paradise?" and "Who Soaped Up Mrs. Hippo?".
- Marabou: A photographer who knows all about art, and he will tell anyone about it.
- Chameleon: Chameleon is an anthropomorphic lizard and a resident of the zoo.
- Stork: A female stork and childhood friend of Ostrich before she tried to sabotage Ostrich in "Who Painted the Ostrich?".
- Ostrich: Ostrich is one of the long-legged birds in the zoo. She is nearsighted and often makes grammatical errors. Ostrich dates Elephant.
- Crane: A crane famous at the zoo for her marvelous singing voice.
- Peacock: An arrogant peacock who sees himself as the most beautiful animal in the zoo.
- Skunk: A grumpy gardener who only likes to clean. She can get very mad if her place is dirty.
- Gorilla: One of the strongest animal in the zoo. He is also athletic, likes bananas, and practices boxing. Gorilla is also employed as a bouncer at Baboon's restaurant.
- Elephant: An elephant who appeared in "Who Plugged Up the Elephant's Trunk?", "Who Knotted Up The Octopus?", and "Who Trunked the Elephant?".
- Mr. Sloth & Mrs. Sloth: Two sloths who appeared in "Who Plugged Up the Elephant's Trunk?", "Who Dented the Turtle?". Mrs. Sloth also appeared in "Who Cemented The Turtle?". Both of them talk and move very slowly and are usually seen napping.
- Lion: A laid back lion who often agrees with whatever anyone says aloud.
- Cheetah: A racing champion cheetah whose enclosure is filled with exercise equipment and various medals and trophies he has won.
- Tiger: An old colorblind tiger who used to serve in a commando unit of the army.
- Gazelle: A gazelle beautician who opened her own business after being fired by Mrs. Fennec in "Who Sabotaged Mrs. Fennec's Machine?". In flashback, it is shown she learned at the same monastery as Sherlock and used to be a ninja.
- Giraffe: A female giraffe who writes the gossip column of the zoo's newspaper.
- Raccoon Speed: A sushi deliveryman who gets around the zoo using his moped. He owns a business called Speedy Raccoon's Sushi and has a motto that claims the sushi will be there by the time a buyer has finished ordering.
- Chef Panda: The husband of Mrs. Panda and the chef for his own restaurant. He used to be bigger but he has lost a lot of weight ever since he opened the restaurant since he never took a holiday and was more focused on feeding others.
- Mrs. Panda: Chef Panda's wife.
- Mr. Hippo: A hippo who decided to become a repairman after Chef Panda fired him. Unfortunately, he is not a very good repairman as whatever he was working on often falls apart. He is also a bit clumsy as he usually hits his hand with his own hammer.
- Porcupine: A porcupine who enjoys playing golf in his free time.
- Coyote: A coyote who considers his fleas to be his best friends and howls at certain times of the day.
- Flamingo: A flamingo Postman who often refers to the last thing in his sentences in different ways (ex: “...old, antique, ancient” from “Who Bugged The Porcupine?”).
- Dromedary: A dromedary camel who tried to become a zoo detective in "Who Targeted the Tiger?" but decided to instead become a detective novel writer by the end of the episode.
- Parrot: A parrot who runs a radio joke show that involves imitating and prank calling other animals. He is also allergic to cat hair.
- Myna: A myna bird who worked as Parrot's assistant and was his biggest fan for years, but unlike Parrot his jokes are not very funny.
- Bobcat: An old bobcat who, like Old Horse, suffers from memory problems.
- Mrs. Hippo: A hippo who owns a salon.
- Vampire Bat: A vampire bat musician from Mexico who plays the guitar at night and sleeps during the day.
- Beaver: A nervous guitarist who's also afraid of heights. environment. He resides in the musician's enclosure alongside Howler Monkey, Koala, and Boa.
- Little Roo: He is the son of Kangaroo and appeared in "Who Stuck the Gorilla in the Sand?" and was babysat by Hermione in Who Broke The Crane's Voice?.
- Rockhopper: Rockhopper is the zoo's main fashion designer.
- Baby Panda: A baby panda that appeared in some of the Ball of Purity flashback sequences.
- Lemur: A lemur that is usually employed as a prop-man for most zoo entertainment productions.
- Grizzly: A grizzly bear who sells pancakes from his mobile stand, picks his nose (which he states is a common practice among other grizzly bears in "Who Blinded The Giraffe?"), and never laughs.
- Warthog: The stinkiest animal in the zoo. He has a very bad taste and is allergic to soap.
- Orangutan: An orangutan actor who appeared in "Who Glued Up the Orangutan?", "Who Blackmailed the Myna?", and "Who Fooled the Hippopotamus?".
- Chihuahua: A chihuahua theatre director who appeared in "Who Broke the Kangaroo's Hand?", "Who Glued the Orangutan?", "Who Cut Up the Rockhopper's Collection?", and "Who Psychedelicized Chameleon?".
- Kangaroo: A kangaroo boxer who appeared in "Who Broke The Kangaroo's Hand?", "Who Glued Up The Orangutan?", "Who Robbed The Tapir?","Who Chocked Up The Grizzly?”, "Who Stuck The Gorilla in the Sand?", "Who Made The Crocodile Cry?", Who Smeared The Zebu?", and "Who Kidnapped Hermione?". He also acted as a replacement for Hermione in "Who Chocked Up The Grizzly?".
- Mrs. Guinea Pig: The leader of the troublemaking guinea pigs and very active.
- Guinea Pigs: Two very active and troublemaking guinea pigs that work alongside Mrs. Guinea Pig.
- Boa: A snake and legless pianist who plays his piano with his head. He resides in the musician's enclosure alongside Howler Monkey, Koala, and Beaver.
- Howler Monkey: A howler monkey who appeared in "Who Knocked Out the Howling Monkey?", Who Mugged the Boa?", and "Who Sunk the Pelican?". He resides in the musician's enclosure alongside Beaver, Koala, and Boa.
- Koala: A koala who appeared in "Who Knocked Out The Howling Monkey?" and "Who Mugged The Boa?". He resides in the musician's enclosure alongside Howler Monkey, Beaver, and Boa.
- Okapi: A calm curer who sells herbal medicine.
- Mrs. Fennec: A fox beautician who only uses technological devices to better her customer's appearances.
- Baboon: A cheapskate baboon restaurant owner who likes to make money by minimizing the cost of everything and convincing others to pay him more.
- Zebu: A zebu who tried to replace Sherlock as Zoo Director in "Who Knocked Out Sherlock?", "Who Smeared The Zebu?" and "Who Targeted the Tiger?".
- Tapir: An old superstitious tapir that runs his own noodle shop and who only appeared in "Who Robbed The Tapir?". In the episode, Crocodile robs him of his good luck charm from the Ming Dynasty while he was busy looking at Tiger's red fireworks show.
- Crocodile: A crocodile banker who appeared in "Who Robbed the Tapir", "Who Stuck the Gorilla in the Sand?", "Who Made the Crocodile Cry", and "Who Tied Up the Beaver?".
- Zebra : A zebra who cares deeply about his appearance. He won the "Best Striped Animal in the Zoo" contest in "Who Unstriped The Zebra?" and painted on by Okapi for beating him in the contest as a result.
- Garter Snake: A snake who appeared in "Who Unstriped The Zebra?" and "Who Cut Up the Rockhopper's Collection?". She has the ability to hypnotize other animals by getting them to look into her eyes.
- Octopus: An octopus who began working at Chef Panda's restaurant as of "Who Knotted Up The Octopus?".
- Old Horse: A horse who sometimes forgets what he wants to say because he was hit too many times in the head when he was a boxer.
- Mrs. Penguin: A penguin who appeared in "Who Robbed The Crane?" and "Who Froze Up Mrs. Penguin?".
- Little Croc: He is the son of Crocodile and appeared in "Who Stuck the Gorilla in the Sand?". Another little croc also appeared in some of the Ball of Purity flashbacks.
- Tiny Porcupine: She is the daughter of Porcupine and appeared in "Who Stuck the Gorilla in the Sand?".
