= Joanna Higson =

English actress

- Born: 29 May 1983 (age 43); Horwich, Greater Manchester, England
- Occupation: Actress
- Years active: 2007–present

Joanna Higson (born 29 May 1983) is an English actress. She graduated from Salford University with a First Class Honours degree in Media and Performance in 2006. She joined the cast of Shameless in series 6, playing the role of "Maxine". She appeared in the first series of Sky One and later Sky Max’s production “Brassic” where she played a minor role. She reprised the role playing a more prominent part as manager of a club with Erin (Michelle Keegan) and later part of the main group.

== Career ==
=== Television ===
Higson's first television role came on 22 January 2007 when she was cast by Jim Cartwright for a role in an episode of The Afternoon Play on BBC One entitled, "Johnny Shakespeare". She then appeared in the pilot episode of Scallywagga when the series was titled Spacehopper. She played Amy Osbourne in Cold Blood in June 2007 and also in Cold Blood 5: The Last Hurrah on 3 January 2008. On 13 December 2007 she appeared in an episode of the BBC television series, The Street.

From April to June 2008, Higson returned in the comedy sketch show series Scallywagga on BBC Three. She played a number of lead characters including the role of Greggs Girl.

Higson appeared as a new regular character, Maxine Donnelly, in Series 6 and 7 of the Channel 4 comedy drama, Shameless from January 2009 to 2010. She left the show after 31 episodes over two series; her character was never mentioned again.

Higson then appeared in the Jimmy McGovern BBC1 Drama Accused broadcast in November 2010, playing the young daughter of Christopher Eccleston's character, Willy, whose single chance encounter with a money launderer leads to a slippery criminal downfall for and his family and him.

She played the character Rachel Reid, a troubled and fragile alcoholic, in one episode of Series 14 of the long-running BBC medical drama Holby City broadcast on 29 December 2011. In April, it was confirmed that the BBC would bring back the Rachel character due to her popularity with viewers. Her character reappeared on 28 August 2012 in the episode "Taxi For Spence" In 2012, Higson played the role of Sarah Milson, directed by Joanna Lumley, in Lumley's Little Crackers episode "Joanna Lumley's Little Cracker: Baby, Be Blonde".

She appeared in three episodes of Doctors (8 January 2013 and 9 January 2013), as the character Lindsey Holt, in the episodes "My Brother's Keeper", Parts 1 and 2, and "I Want to Break Free" (30 September 2014).

In 2015, Higson played the role of Vicky Hall in the third series of the BBC's WPC56 in three episodes: "Walk the Line" (10 March 2015), "From the Shadows" (11 March 2015), and "Requiem" (13 March 2015).

Higson is currently playing "Sugar", part of the main cast in the Sky One series Brassic which began airing in August 2019. She has appeared in all of the seasons to date.

== Filmography ==
Television and film roles
Year	Title	Role	Episodes
2007	The Afternoon Play	Tracey	1 Episode
2007	Scallywagga	Various/Greggs girl	
2007	The Street	Louise	1 Episode
2008	Cold Blood	Amy Osborne	1 Episode
2009-2010	Shameless	Maxine Donnelly	31 Episodes
2010	Accused	Laura Houlihan	1 Episode
2012	Holby City	Rachael Reid	2 Episodes
2012	Little Crackers	Sarah	1 Episode
2016	WPC56	Vicky Hall	1 Episode
2018	Suffragettes with Lucy Worsley	Head Wardress	1 Episode
2013-2018	Doctors	Lindsay Holt, Chelsea Kennedy, Chrissie Jardine	4 Episodes
2018	Care	Police Officer 2	TV Movie
2019-2025	Brassic	Sugar	25 Episode

=== Theatre ===
Among her theatrical roles, in 2008 Higson appeared in two plays, Road and Spring and Port Wine, at the Octagon Theatre in Bolton.

Higson played Jo in A Taste of Honey at The New Vic Theatre in Stoke in 2009, where she returned in 2011 for the repertory season, playing Lydia Languish in The Rivals, Hilda Crompton in Spring and Port Wine, and Lady Agetha in The Admirable Crichton.

In 2013, she played the roles of Clara Copperfield and Agnes Wickfield in David Copperfield at The Oldham Coliseum Theatre, and Jenny Crabtree in The Transit of Venus at the Cul-De-Sac Theatre.

She toured with the Bolton Octagon production of Hobsons Choice directed by David Thacker in 2014.

In 2015, Higson played Dee in Richard Harris' The Business of Murder produced by the Middle Ground Theatre Company which toured the UK.

== Other interests ==
Higson owns a photography studio, Joanna Higson Photography, that specialises in head shots for actors' resumes.
