= Lunch Monkeys =

- Genre: Comedy
- Starring: Nigel Havers; Siân Reeves; Chris Hannon; Abdullah Afzal; Rachel Rae; Jessica Hall; Christian Foster; Steve John Shepherd; Camilla Beeput; Michael Taylor; Kulvinder Ghir
- Country of origin: United Kingdom
- Original language: English
- No. of series: 2
- No. of episodes: 12

Production
- Producer: Channel X North

Original release
- Network: BBC Three
- Release: 12 May 2008 – 10 March 2011

Lunch Monkeys is a British sitcom, first shown on BBC Three in 2008.

== Overview ==
Lunch Monkeys by David Isaac is a BBC Three comedy series, produced by Channel X North, set in the administration department of fictional personal injury law firm Fox Cranford. The stories focus on the support staffers who work in the postroom of a Mancunian firm of solicitors. The postroom workers tend to be immature, lazy, disorganised, and unproductive, including their supervisor—the firm's office manager—all of whom constantly frustrate the efforts of the firm's managing partner.

The series is made by Manchester indie Channel K and series 2 went into production in April 2010. The BBC Press Office announced the return of the six-episode new series on 3 February 2011.

On 27 May 2011 it was revealed by BBC Three's Controller Zai Bennett, that the show had been cancelled along with fellow BBC Three Comedies Coming of Age and How Not to Live Your Life. He explained that "They were good to the channel, but have had their time,".

== Episode list ==
=== Pilot (2008) ===
1. "Admin"

=== Series 1 (2009) ===
1. "Spacepants": Introduction of Shelley the new girl. Kenny is trying to ask Tania out, but only succeeds in getting sidetracked into finding spacepants.
2. "Dog Boy Darrel": Hypnotism is used to make Darrel bark on command.
3. "Ice Pops": Asif and Shelley sell ice-pops in the office, Asif tries to impress Lee Ann.
4. "Fire": Darrel becomes fire marshal but annoys everyone in the office.
5. "Temp": Darrel and the temp get engaged after one date, however, she isn't all she seems.
6. "Ghost": Kenny convinces Asif there is a ghost in the office.

=== Series 2 (2011) ===
1. "Super-Visor": Tania has her first appraisal, Asif scores a legal victory.
2. "Monkey Love": Darrel has a crush on Mike's daughter, Shelley organises a client presentation.
3. "Smoke and Mirrors": Shelley wakes up in the office with a hangover, while rumours fly about Kenny and Tania's sex life
4. "Dream a Little Dream": Tania has planned a motivational exercise involving hats and five-year life plans.
5. "Who's the daddy?" : Darrel's dad Pat turns up doing odd jobs at Fox Cranford, while Kenny is stressed because everyone thinks he's boring.
6. "Big trouble in little Cranford" : They all make a party for Mike as they think he is depressed.

== Main cast ==
- Nigel Havers as Mike Cranford
- Siân Reeves as Gloria Stevens
- Chris Hannon as Darrel Wadsworth
- Abdullah Afzal as Asif Khan
- Rachel Rae as Shelley Benson
- Jessica Hall as Tania MacGuire
- Christian Foster as Kenny Graham
- Steve John Shepherd as Charlie Brierson
- Camilla Beeput as Lee Ann Brown
- Michael Taylor as Swanney
- Kulvinder Ghir as Mohammed Khan

== International broadcast ==
In Australia, season one aired on ABC2 each Monday at 9pm from 28 June 2010.
