= Luke Gell =

English actor

- Born: England
- Occupation: Actor
- Years active: 2000–2017
- Television: Two Pints of Lager and a Packet of Crisps; Scallywagga

Luke Gell is a retired English actor, best known for the role of Tim Claypole in the BBC Three sitcom, Two Pints of Lager and a Packet of Crisps. He is the founding director of a drama training workshop and agency for young actors in Nottingham called Inspire Academy.

== Early life and education ==
Luke Gell is from Nottingham. He trained at Central Independent Television's Television Workshop from the age of 11, where he was once described as a "young Peter Kay".

== Career ==
Gell has been acting on television since the age of 11, beginning with a role in Bernard's Watch, which was filmed in Nottingham. He also appeared in the long-running hospital dramas Casualty and Holby City (2014), and in the sitcom Still Open All Hours (2018).

He joined the cast of Two Pints of Lager and a Packet of Crisps in 2008 following the departure of Ralf Little, appearing in three series up until the show's eventual cancellation in 2011.

From April to June 2008, Gell appeared in the BBC Three comedy Scallywagga. He appeared in a one-off episode of Above Their Station on 22 February 2010.

In 2017, he retired from acting.

=== Inspire Academy ===
In January 2007, Gell founded a weekend drama workshop for young actors called Inspire Academy, inspired by his own experience of training at the Television Workshop. As of June 2025 he remains executive director of the acting school, which also runs an employment agency for actors.

Alumni of the academy include Shalisha James-Davis, who appeared in the 2018 film Mary Queen of Scots, and Lara Peake, who appeared in the 2020 American science fiction drama series A Brave New World and the 2025 British miniseries Reunion.

== Personal life ==
In 2020, Gell opened up his own café in Stapleford, Nottinghamshire.

== Filmography ==
Year	Title	Role	Notes
2000	Barbara	Boy Number 1	Series 2
2003	Dangerville	Luke	1 episode
2006	Crusade in Jeans	Bertho	Film
2008–2011	Two Pints of Lager and a Packet of Crisps	Tim Claypole	Series regular; 23 episodes
2008	Scallywagga	Various	Series regular
2010	Above Their Station	Various	
2013	The Wright Way	Clive	Series regular
2014	Holby City	Phoenix Patterson	S16, e28, "Battle Lines"
2014	Trying Again	Tim	Cameo role - Episode 7
2015	Citizen Khan	Chris	Series 4 Episode 1
2018	Still Open All Hours	Waiter	Series 4 Episode 5
