= Trevor Dion Nicholas =

American actor and singer

- Education: West Virginia University
- Occupations: Singer, actor
- Years active: 2002–present
- Known for: Aladdin; Hamilton

Trevor Dion Nicholas is an American actor and singer. He made his Broadway debut as a standby in Aladdin before starring as the Genie in the original West End cast of the musical. He later starred in Hamilton, Next to Normal, Hadestown, Hercules in the West End.

Nicholas attended Morgantown High School in Morgantown, WV.

He is of African American heritage.

== Acting credits ==
=== Theatre ===
Year(s)	Title	Role	Notes
2002	Big River	Jim	US Tour
2014	The Wizard Of Oz	Cowardly Lion	Tuacahn
2014	Joseph and the Amazing Technicolor Dreamcoat	Judah	Tuacahn
2015	The Wiz	The Cowardly Lion	Maltz Jupiter Theatre
2015–2016	Aladdin	Genie / Babkak / Sultan (standby)	Broadway
2016–2018	Aladdin	The Genie	West End
2018	Aladdin	The Genie	US Tour
2018–2019	Aladdin	The Genie	West End
2019–2022	Hamilton	George Washington	West End
2022	Bonnie & Clyde	The Preacher	West End
2022–2023	Hamilton	George Washington	West End
2023	Next to Normal	Dr. Madden / Dr. Fine	Off-West End
2023	Bat Boy: The Musical	Dr. Thomas Parker	West End
2024	Side Show	Jake	West End
2024	Next to Normal	Dr. Madden / Dr. Fine	West End
2024	Made in Dagenham	Mr Tooley	West End
2024–2025	Hadestown	Hades	West End
2025–2026	Hercules	Phil	West End
2026	Thelma & Louise	Hal	Young Vic Off-West End

=== Filmography ===
Year(s)	Title	Role	Notes
2014	The Americans	Security Guard	Episode: "The Walk In"
2017	Lego Marvel Super Heroes 2	Nick Fury, Luke Cage (voice)	Video game
2018	Xenoblade Chronicles 2: Torna – The Golden Country	Minoth, Soldiers (voice)	Video game
2021–2022	Moley	Lester (voice)	17 episodes
2022	Scrooge: A Christmas Carol	Ghost of Christmas Present (voice)	Netflix film
2022	The Unstoppable Yellow Yeti	Gustav (voice)	4 episodes
2023	Captain Laserhawk: A Blood Dragon Remix	Police Sergeant (voice)	Television series
2024	Bonnie and Clyde: The Musical	The Preacher	Live stage recording
2025	Great Performances	Dr. Fine / Dr. Madden	Episode: "Next to Normal"
TBA	Aladdin: The Broadway Musical	Genie	Live stage recording
