= Mina Anwar =

British actress

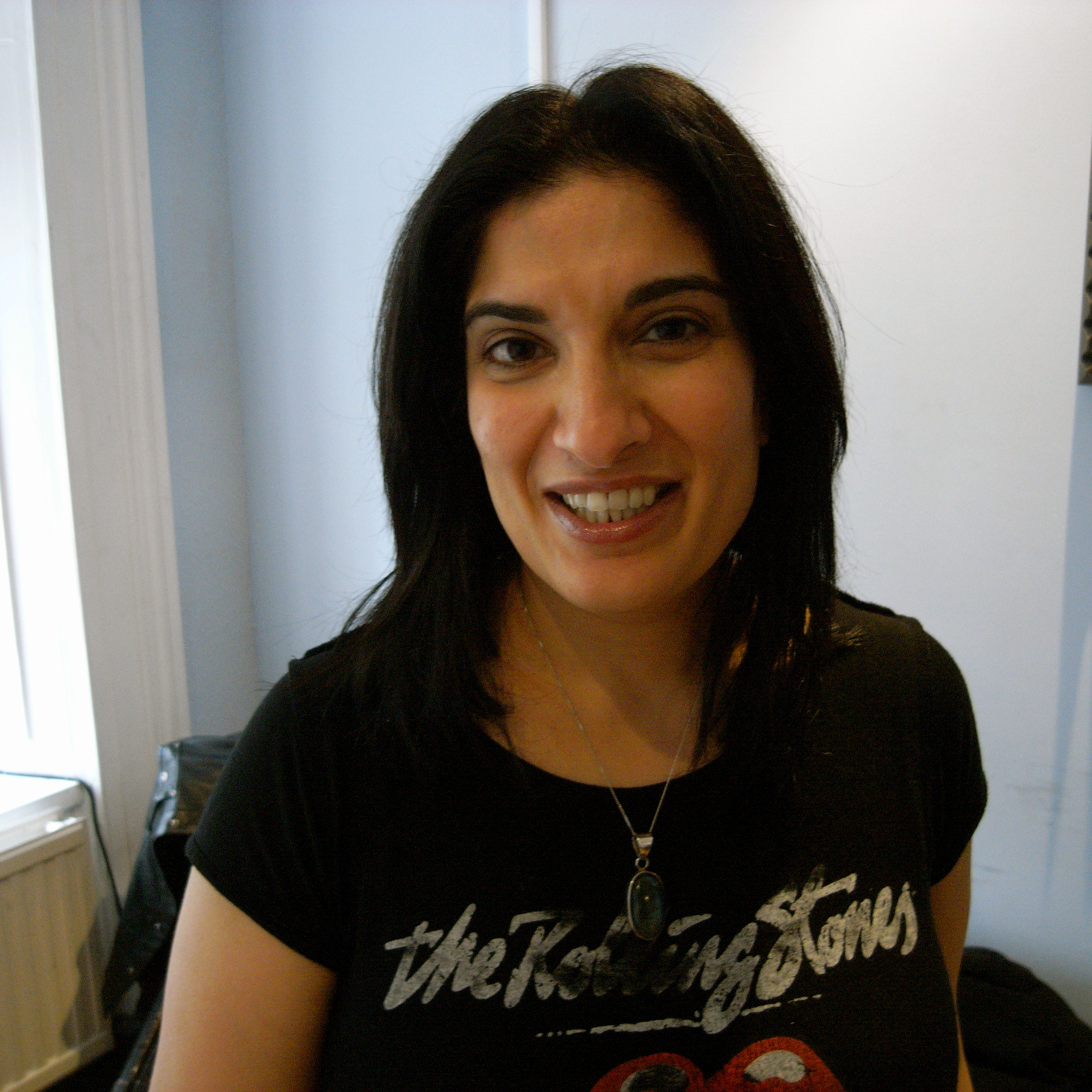
- Anwar in 2011
- Born: Mina Mumtaz Anwar; 20 September 1969 (age 57); Church, Lancashire, England
- Education: Mountview Academy of Theatre Arts
- Occupation: Actress
- Years active: 1995–present

Mina Mumtaz Anwar (born 20 September 1969) is a British actress. She is best known for her roles as Constable Maggie Habib in The Thin Blue Line (1995–1996) and Gita Chandra in The Sarah Jane Adventures (2008–2011).

== Early life ==
Anwar was born to a family of Pakistani origin in Church, Lancashire on 20 September 1969. She was educated at Accrington Moorhead High School, and gained an A level in Theatre in Performance at the Accrington and Rossendale College in 1988 before training at the Mountview Academy of Theatre Arts in London.

== Career ==
Anwar played Police Constable Maggie Habib in the TV sitcom The Thin Blue Line, first shown on BBC 1 from 1995 to 1996.

Other roles include the recurring part of Sandra Malik in The Bill in 2003, Sister Zita Khan in Doctors and Nurses and Selena Sharp in Scoop. She also performed as the storyteller in Razzledazzle on the CBeebies channel.

Anwar appeared in the Channel 4 drama Shameless, and as a supporting character in children's sci-fi drama The Sarah Jane Adventures, in which she played Gita Chandra, the mother of character Rani Chandra, from its second to fifth series. She was also in the BBC drama show The Invisibles. Anwar appeared in Coronation Street as the ex-wife of Dev Alahan, the corner-shop owner, and in No Angels.

She starred in The Infidel as Muna, and portrayed Trudy Rehmann in the Nickelodeon series House of Anubis. She has appeared in a number of BBC TV dramas and sitcoms, such as The Wright Way, in which she plays the only female health-and-safety officer, Malika Maha, and in an episode of Upstart Crow where she portrayed one of the three witches from Macbeth. She appeared in the 2014 dramas Happy Valley and In the Club and the ghost tale Remember Me. In 2014 she portrayed Lauren in The Beneficiary, episode 5 of series 6 of the BBC's series of 45-minute stand-alone dramas Moving On.

In 2017, she originated the role of Ray in the new musical Everybody's Talking About Jamie at the Crucible Theatre, Sheffield, and continued her role for the West End transfer.

Anwar appeared in Series 10 of Doctor Who in 2017.

In 2018, she played Miss Marigold Mould in Series 2 of The Worst Witch.

In 2026, she starred as Madame Thenardier in the musical Les Misérables.

== Filmography ==
=== Film ===
Year	Title	Role	Notes
2000	Maybe Baby	Yasmin	
2010	The Infidel	Muna	
2015	Sleeping Lions	Mrs. Ghosh	Short film
2018	An Admin Worker at the End of the World	Brenda	Short film
2020	Farewell, Sarah Jane	Gita Chandra	Short film
2020	The Understudy	Donna	
2020	Stuart and Dumplings	Khadija	Short film

=== Television ===
Year	Title	Role	Notes
1995	99-1	Dr. Resdale	Episode: "Stone"
1995–1996	The Thin Blue Line	W.P.C. Maggie Habib	14 episodes
1997	Flight	Shikha	TV film
1999	Barbara	Midwife	Episode: "Scattering"
1999	The Flint Street Nativity	Shamima / Angel	TV film
2000	A Christmas Carol	Julie	TV film
2001	I Love the '80s	Herself	TV series documentary; 5 episodes
2001	I Love the '90s	Herself	TV series documentary; 2 episodes
2001	Always and Everyone	Meera Kapoor	Episode: #3.13
2002	TV to Go	Various Roles	Episode: #2.1
2002	Casualty	Shelley	Episode: "Dominoes"
2002	Birthday Girl	Nina Kapoor	TV film
2002	Doctors	Maria	Episode: "Labour Day"
2003	The Bill	Dr. Sandra Malik	4 episodes
2004	Doctors and Nurses	Sister Zita Khan	6 episodes
2004	Best Friends	Miss Mancer	4 episodes
2005	Razzledazzle	Presenter	11 episodes
2005	ShakespeaRe-Told	Flute	Episode: " A Midsummer Night's Dream"
2005–2006	Coronation Street	Ravinder Kalirai	6 episodes
2005, 2016	Holby City	Saima 'Sam' Ahmed / Fay Michaels	2 episodes
2006	The Gil Mayo Mysteries	Tina Beaverstock	Episode: "A Species of Revenge"
2006	No Angels	Jeena	2 episodes
2008	Shameless	Auntie Shaza	Episode: "Old Friends, New Enemies"
2008	Love Soup	Antonia	Episode: "Sophisticated Lady"
2008	The Invisibles	Helen Huthwaite	6 episodes
2008–2011	The Sarah Jane Adventures	Gita Chandra	18 episodes
2009–2011	Scoop	Selena Sharp / Prosecutor	9 episodes
2010	A Passionate Woman	Mrs Patel	Episode: #1.2
2011–2013	House of Anubis	Trudy Rehman	106 episodes
2013	Anubis Unlocked	Herself	Episode: #2.7
2013	The Wright Way	Malika Maha	6 episodes
2013	The Slammer	Lydia	Episode: "Come Lie with Me"
2014	Happy Valley	Mrs. Mukherjee	3 episodes
2014	Rocket's Island	Kim Khalol	5 episodes
2014	Scott & Bailey	Eleanor Goodhead	2 episodes
2014	Moving On	Lauren	Episode: "The Beneficiary"
2014	Remember Me	Roshana Salim	2 episodes
2014–2016	In the Club	Amita	6 episodes
2015	Marley's Ghosts	Tina Jarvis	3 episodes
2015	Cuffs	Leila Kamal	Episode: #1.6
2016	The A Word	Dr. Waite	Episode: "Diagnosis"
2016	Upstart Crow	Weird Sister	Episode: "What Bloody Man Is That?"
2016	Damned	Catilin	Episode: #1.6
2016, 2019	Pointless Celebrities	Herself	2 episodes
2017	Doctor Who	Goodthing	Episode: "Smile"
2018	The Worst Witch	Miss Mould	10 episodes
2020	Terms & Conditions	Captain Rules	9 episodes
2020	When It Rains	Spa Owner	Episode: "Helpline"
2021	Moving On	Mrs Ellis	Episode: "Hungry to Learn"
2023	Midsomer Murders	Eshani Hughes	Episode: "Claws Out"
2024	Sister Boniface Mysteries	Samira Rowbotham	Episode: "Once Upon a Time"

=== Audio ===
Year	Title	Role	Notes
2023	Rani Takes on the World	Gita Chandra	Spin-off of The Sarah Jane Adventures
2026	Doctors On Hold	Malika Begum	
