= Jessica Hall (British actress) =

British actress

- Born: 1981 (age 44–45); Leigh, Greater Manchester, England
- Occupation: Actress
- Years active: 2006–present
- Spouse: Jamie Lawson

Jessica Hall is an English actress, known for her role as Sheila Buxton in the Channel 4 soap opera Hollyoaks.

== Career ==
She attended Fred Longworth Arts College, Wigan and Leigh College and The University of Aberystwyth before completing her training at The Royal Welsh College of Music and Drama in 2005. In 2006, Hall played the role of Laura Hammond in the multi award-winning, Jimmy McGovern drama, The Street. In the same year she appeared in Eleventh Hour. Jessica is married to singer Jamie Lawson. On 30 October 2006, she appeared in an episode of the daytime television soap opera, Doctors as Heather Ayres. From April to June 2008, Hall appears in the comedy sketch show series Scallywagga on BBC Three. One of the characters she plays in the show is "Disco Donna". On 22 May 2008 Hall again appeared in Doctors, this time as a young student, Sarah Hollis, at the fictitious University of Letherbridge. From July 2009 until March 2010, Hall portrayed Sheila Buxton in the Channel 4 soap opera Hollyoaks. From September 2009 to May 2011, Hall is starred in BBC Three sitcom Lunch Monkeys as Tania. In May 2023, Hall returned to Doctors as Carol Hanigan.

== Filmography ==
=== Television ===
The Street (2006)
Eleventh Hour (2006)
Doctors (2006, 2008, 2023)
Scallywagga (2008)
Hollyoaks (2009-2010)
Lunch Monkeys (2009-2011)
