= Stuart Kenworthy =

British comedy writer

Stuart Kenworthy is a British comedy writer, most noted for his work in the sketch show Smack the Pony and the sitcom Green Wing. A scene originated by Stuart, for Green Wing, was nominated for Most Memorable Comedy Moment of 2005 (BBC TV Moments). The pilot episode of Scallywagga (previously called Spacehopper) won Best Comedy at the RTS North West Awards 2007. The first series of Scallywagga was broadcast on BBC Three in April 2008. Previously, Kentworthy spent ten years working as a photographic artist, supplementing his income by working as an Evidence Gathering photographer for Lancashire Constabulary. In 1999, he gained a first class honors degree in Sociology and was awarded the faculty prize from the University of Leicester. His agent is Hugo Young at Independent, London.

== Writer ==
Smack the Pony - (1999-2003)
TV Burp - (2002)
The All-New Harry Hill Show - (2003)
UGetMe - (2003)
The Crust - (2003)
Green Wing - (2004-2007)
Planet Sketch - (2005–2007)
Comic Relief - Green Wing Sketch - (2005)
Man Stroke Woman - (2005, 2007)
It's Adam and Shelley - (2007)
Spacehopper - (2007)
Rush Hour - (2007)
Scallywagga - (2008-2010)
Canimals - (2011–2018)
Mr Bloom's Nursery - (2012)
Tilly and Friends - (2012–2013)
DNN - (2013–2014)
Angry Birds Toons - (2013–2016)
Strange Hill High - (2013–2014)
Swashbuckle - (2014)
Toot the Tiny Tugboat - (2014–2015)
The Furchester Hotel - (2015, 2017)
Go Jetters - (2016–2017)
Oddbods - (2016–2017)
Angry Birds Blues - (2017)
Bitz & Bob - (2018) (segment "Sinking Feeling")
Space Chickens in Space - (2018–2019)
