= Scrooge: A Christmas Carol =

2022 animated musical fantasy film

- Directed by: Stephen Donnelly
- Screenplay by: Stephen Donnelly; Leslie Bricusse
- Based on: Scrooge by Ronald Neame; A Christmas Carol by Charles Dickens
- Produced by: Ralph Kamp; Andrew Pearce; Leslie Bricusse
- Starring: Luke Evans; Olivia Colman; Jessie Buckley; Jonathan Pryce; Johnny Flynn; James Cosmo; Trevor Dion Nicholas
- Edited by: Graham Silcock; Felipe Vasquez
- Music by: Jeremy Holland-Smith (Score); Leslie Bricusse (Songs)
- Production companies: Timeless Films; Axis Studios
- Distributed by: Netflix
- Release dates: 18 November 2022 (United States); 2 December 2022 (United Kingdom)
- Running time: 96 minutes
- Countries: United Kingdom; United States
- Language: English

Scrooge: A Christmas Carol is a 2022 animated family Christmas musical fantasy comedy film directed by Stephen Donnelly. It is an animated remake of the 1970 film Scrooge, written by Leslie Bricusse, which itself is based on the 1843 novel A Christmas Carol by Charles Dickens.

The film was produced by Timeless Films, and features the voices of Luke Evans, Olivia Colman, Jessie Buckley, Jonathan Pryce, Johnny Flynn, James Cosmo and Trevor Dion Nicholas. It was released in select theaters on November 18, 2022, and on Netflix on December 2, 2022. The film is dedicated to Leslie Bricusse, who died a year before its release. The film received mixed reviews from critics with criticism aimed at the pacing and humour but praise for the animation, soundtrack, and voice acting.

== Plot ==
On Christmas Eve in 1843 London, Harry Huffman encounters his grumpy uncle, Ebenezer Scrooge and Scrooge's friendly English Mastiff, Prudence. Scrooge evades Harry long enough to refuse giving money to a charity and add in a debt that is owed by the local toy shop owner, Tom Jenkins, who needed to pay for medical treatment for his mother.

After returning to his counting house, Scrooge declines an invitation to a Christmas dinner party from Harry. Scrooge hates Harry because his sister and Harry's mother, Jen, died giving birth to Harry. He reluctantly lets his underpaid clerk, Bob Cratchit, take the next day off for Christmas. Bob lives in poverty with his wife, Ethel and their many children, including Tiny Tim, who is gravely sick and cannot receive medical treatment due to lack of money.

After Scrooge closes for the night, he and Prudence go home, where he is haunted by his deceased business partner and Prudence's former owner, Jacob Marley, who taught him to be merciless. Marley is forced to pull chains around his soul that represent the bad actions he made when he was alive. He warns Scrooge that he will suffer a similar fate unless he changes his greedy ways. Marley has arranged for three visitors to teach him how to be a better man.

Scrooge meets the first visitor, a wax-like shape-shifting being called Past, who takes him through his life before present. Scrooge's father was sent to debtors' prison, so Scrooge needed to provide income for Jen and their mother. After his father was released, he worked for a kind-hearted businessman named Mr. Fezziwig. He was engaged to Mr. Fezziwig's daughter, Isabel before Marley offered him a job that had more security. Isabel witnessed Scrooge and Marley shut down a bakery that was Bob's childhood home and broke up with Scrooge for focusing more on his business than her. Scrooge insists that he and Isabel needed to be financially secure before they could be married but expresses regret for pushing her away. Scrooge discovers that Isabel married another man and became a parent.

Scrooge meets the second visitor, a joyful giant called Present, who wants to show Scrooge how to live life. He shows Scrooge how Harry will spend Christmas. Harry loves Scrooge due to being told how much he loved Jen. He is then shown how the Cratchit family will spend Christmas in their small home with poor health but will go forth with happiness by being thankful for what they have, especially Tim.

Scrooge meets the third visitor called Yet to Come, who shows Scrooge the future where Tom leads a celebration of expressing gratitude to Scrooge. Scrooge thinks that he is being praised, but Prudence discovers that they are actually celebrating his death. Scrooge learns the truth after discovering that Tim has died. Only a few people attend his funeral including Prudence and Tom, who, alongside another man, came to mock Scrooge's death. Scrooge is given an example of what his afterlife will be if he does not change his greedy ways. Shocked, Scrooge vows that he will change his greedy ways if Tim will still live.

Discovering that it is Christmas, Scrooge accepts Isabel's new life and has his place decorated for a Christmas party. With everyone who he invited in attendance, he erases Tom's debt, he gives a donation to the charity and Harry a Santa Claus doll that Jen made him when they were children, and he promotes Cratchit to be his new business partner. Scrooge then celebrates Christmas with his assortment of companions.

== Voice cast ==
- Luke Evans as Ebenezer Scrooge, a grumpy moneylender who hates Christmas.
- Olivia Colman as Past, an excitable shape-shifting being made of candle wax with a flame on top of her head. Her default form is based on that of a singer Scrooge had seen on a poster.
- Jessie Buckley as Isabel Fezziwig, Scrooge's ex-fiancée and Mr. Fezziwig's daughter, based on Belle from the original story.
- Jonathan Pryce as Jacob Marley, Scrooge's deceased business partner who is punished after death by dragging chains that represent his transgressions in life, and warns Scrooge to avoid him suffering the same fate but worse.
- Johnny Flynn as Bob Cratchit, Scrooge's long-suffering clerk. In this film, he is depicted with heterochromia.
- James Cosmo as Mr. Fezziwig, Scrooge's enthusiastic former employer and Isabel's father.
- Trevor Dion Nicholas as Present, a fun-loving giant.
- Fra Fee as Harry Scrooge, Scrooge's nephew who adores Christmas. He is based on Fred from the original story.
- Giles Terera as Tom Jenkins, the owner of the toy shop who is indebted to Scrooge.
- Homer Todiwala as Tamal
- Jemima Lucy Newman as Jen Scrooge, Scrooge's kind-hearted sister who died giving birth to Harry. She is based on Fan from the original story.
- Rebecca Gethings as Ethel Cratchit, Bob's wife who hates Scrooge.
- Rupert Turnbull as Tiny Tim, Bob and Ethel's son.
  - Oliver Jenkins as Tiny Tim's singing voice.
- Devon Pomeroy as Kathy Cratchit, Bob and Ethel's daughter who likes to do Christmas caroling with Tim.
- Sheena Bhattessa as Hela Huffman, Harry's wife and Scrooge's niece-in-law.

== Music ==
No.	Title	Performer(s)	Length
1.	"I Love Christmas"	Fra Fee	2:59
2.	"Christmas Children"	Johnny Flynn	3:29
3.	"Tell Me"	Luke Evans	3:26
4.	"Christmas Wishes"	Jemima Lucy Newman	2:17
5.	"Happiness"	Luke Evans & Jessie Buckley	3:49
6.	"Later Never Comes"	Luke Evans & Jessie Buckley	4:27
7.	"I Like Life"	Trevor Dion Nicholas	3:14
8.	"The Beautiful Day"	Oliver Jenkins	2:41
9.	"Thank You Very Much"	Giles Terera	3:55
10.	"I'll Begin Again"	Luke Evans	3:44
11.	"I Love Christmas" (Closing Titles)	Trevor Dion Nicholas	2:51
Total length:			36:52

== Release ==
The film was released on Netflix on December 2, 2022, following a limited theatrical release in the United States on November 18, 2022.

An edited 10-minute version of the film was released in 4D known as "Scrooge 4D: A Christmas Carol".

== Reception ==
On the review aggregator website Rotten Tomatoes, 40% of 15 critics' reviews are positive, with an average rating of 5.3/10. On Metacritic, it has a weighted average score of 46 out of 100 based on 8 reviews, indicating "mixed or average reviews". Lauren Mechling of The Guardian gave the film one star out of five, criticizing the animation and songs, noting that not even the youngest of children wound enjoy it. John Kirk of Original Cin gave the film a "C", writing that the animation was unappealing despite praise for the voice cast. Richard Roeper's review at RogerEbert.com gave the series 1 star out of 4, criticizing the additional characters of Scrooge's dog and the kids. Gabriella Geisinger of Digital Spy gave the film one star out of five.

== See also ==
- List of Christmas films
- List of ghost films
- Adaptations of A Christmas Carol
