= Beattie Edmondson =

English actress (born 1987)

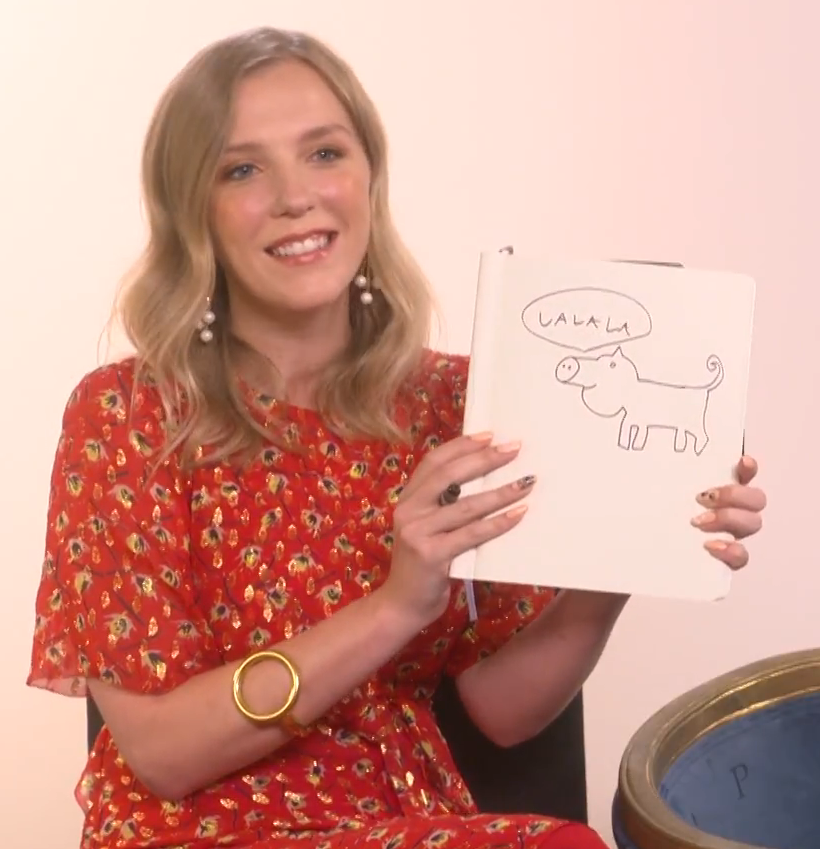
- Edmondson in 2018
- Born: Beatrice Louise Edmondson; 19 June 1987 (age 38); London, England
- Education: Exeter School
- Alma mater: University of Manchester
- Years active: 2008–present
- Television: Josh
- Spouse: Sam Francis (m. 2017)
- Children: 2
- Parents: Adrian Edmondson; Jennifer Saunders
- Relatives: Ella Edmondson (sister)

Beatrice Louise Edmondson (born 19 June 1987) is an English actress. She played Kate, one of the three main characters in the BBC Three sitcom Josh.

== Early life ==
Beatrice Louise Edmondson is the middle daughter of comedians Adrian Edmondson and Jennifer Saunders. She was born in London and grew up in Devon with older sister Ella and younger sister Freya. After being educated at Exeter School, during her second year at her father's alma mater of the University of Manchester she decided not to audition for the Drama Society, instead forming a comedy group with four female friends. They appeared at the following Edinburgh Festival Fringe.

== Career ==
After working the comedy circuit with the all-female sketch troupe, which they named Lady Garden (and later reformed as Birthday Girls with Rose Johnson and Camille Ucan) she broke through into television in 2008. She made her début in the Ben Elton sitcom The Wright Way, which was axed after one series. Her role in the 2015 six-part BBC Three series Josh was singled out by The Independent newspaper as "very watchable", saying her "comic timing stuck out". The show's second series was broadcast in 2016, with a third broadcast in October 2017.

== Personal life ==
Edmondson married BBC News researcher Sam Francis on 4 June 2017. Their first child was born in 2019, and the second in 2021.

== Filmography ==
Year	Title	Role	Notes
2008	Jam & Jerusalem	Beattie Martin	
2010	Shelfstackers	Dani	Episode: "Pilot"
2010	Robert's Web	Various	Episode: "Episode 1.1"
2011	Comic Relief: Uptown Downstairs Abbey	Maid	
2012	Absolutely Fabulous	Waitress	Episode: "Olympics"
2012	Spy	Girl in Club	Episode: "Codename: Family Bonds"
2012	Little Crackers	Annabel	Episode: "Omid Djalili's Little Cracker"
2013	The Wright Way	Victoria	
2014	BBC Comedy Feeds	Kate	Episode: "Josh"
2015	Pompidou	Various	
2015	Marley's Ghosts	Beth	Episode: "Episode 1.3"
2015–2017	Josh	Kate	Series regular
2016	Fresh Meat	Helen	S4E02
2016	Bridget Jones's Baby	Laura	
2018	Patrick	Sarah Francis	
2018	Upstart Crow	Toby	Episode 3.5, "The Most Unkindest Cut of All"
2018	Richard Osman's House of Games	Herself	Series 2, week four
2021	The Pursuit of Love	Louisa	3 episodes
2021	Temple	Pam	Series 2
