= Papa Don't Leech =

- The Simpsons episode
- Promotional image featuring Homer (in his "Colonel Homer" attire) and the Dixie Chicks.
- Episode no.: Season 19; Episode 16
- Directed by: Chris Clements
- Written by: Reid Harrison
- Production code: KABF09
- Original air date: April 13, 2008

Guest appearances
- Beverly D'Angelo as Lurleen Lumpkin; The Chicks as themselves (credited as The Dixie Chicks)

Episode features
- Couch gag: A paintbrush dabs paint blobs on the couch, which form into the Simpsons.
- Commentary: Al Jean; Matt Selman; Tom Gammill; Max Pross; David Silverman

Episode chronology
← Previous "Smoke on the Daughter"	Next → "Apocalypse Cow"
- The Simpsons season 19

"Papa Don't Leech" is the sixteenth episode of the nineteenth season of the American animated television series The Simpsons. It originally aired in the United States on April 13, 2008 on the Fox network. The episode was written by Reid Harrison and directed by Chris Clements.

In this episode, Lurleen Lumpkin turns to Homer when she cannot afford to pay her taxes. Although Marge feels conflicted about her, she thinks that reuniting her with her father will help her. Beverly D'Angelo reprises her role of Lurleen Lumpkin. The Dixie Chicks also appear as themselves. The episode was watched by 6.93 million viewers and received mixed reviews.

== Plot ==
Lisa is delivering scout cookies to Mayor Quimby, but they find the town treasury empty, and he cannot pay for it. The town holds a meeting to raise money. Homer proposes faking a natural disaster to get relief money from the federal government. However, the government officials who come are impostors, and the town goes further into debt. Lisa finds that the town is owed millions of dollars in uncollected taxes, so the town collects them from its residents. Later, Kent Brockman reports that all the residents have paid their back taxes except Lurleen Lumpkin, a country music star whom Homer once managed and who had previously fallen in love with him. (Note: As depicted in the third season episode "Colonel Homer") The town searches for her. Homer finds Lurleen hiding in his car and takes her to the Simpson house. However, Marge, angry from their previous encounter, drives her to her home. When she discovers that Lurleen is homeless, Marge brings her back to the house.

Lurleen cooks a barbecue for the family, but the police arrest her, and she is taken to court. Judge Snyder requires her to pay her debt in increments. Lurleen explains to the Simpsons that all her money went to her former husbands, all of whom resemble Homer. She goes to work for Moe at his bar where she turns down dates with Lenny and Carl. When Marge wonders why Lurleen did that, she hears Lurleen sing about how her father abandoned her. Marge finds Lurleen's father, Royce, and he asks Lurleen for forgiveness. They reconcile, and she writes a new song to celebrate their reunion: "Daddy's Back". However, Royce decides to leave Lurleen again.

Lurleen becomes depressed without her father. She hears a new song from the Dixie Chicks on television that sounds like her song with different lyrics and realizes that her father gave it to them. Later, Homer appears in his Colonel Homer attire with "Major Marge", and they tell her to take control of her destiny. Lurleen tells the Dixie Chicks that her father stole her song, and they hit him with their instruments as punishment. Lurleen becomes the new opening act for the Dixie Chicks and finds a new boyfriend who resembles Homer. As she leaves, Marge and Lurleen embrace, and Marge warns Lurleen never to come near Homer again.

== Production ==
This is the final episode of the series written by Reid Harrison before his death in 2024. Beverly D'Angelo reprised her role as Lurleen Lumpkin. D'Angelo previously voiced this character in the third season episode "Colonel Homer". Country band The Chicks, then known as the Dixie Chicks, appeared as themselves.

== Cultural references ==
Several years prior to the airing of the episode, the Dixie Chicks made remarks about George W. Bush that were perceived to be unpatriotic. In a self-deprecating reverse, the lyrics they sing in the episode were nationalistic in nature.

When Lurleen sings about her father leaving her, Maggie holds the telephone receiver towards the music, which is similar to what happens in the 1985 film Back to the Future. As the Simpsons sing "Daddy's Back" with Lurleen, they mention the book series Harry Potter and the cosmetic brand Estée Lauder.

Homer's dream about being in a car crash with Grampa is an almost shot-for-shot remake of a scene in the 2007 episode of The Sopranos, Kennedy and Heidi.

== Reception ==
=== Viewing figures ===
The episode earned a 2.4 rating and was watched by 6.93 million viewers, which was ranked the 43rd most-watched show that week.

=== Critical response ===
The episode received mixed reviews by critics.

Richard Keller of TV Squad expressed dislike for the episode, stating that he hopes the show will reconsider the next time they decide to give a solo opportunity to a supporting character many people don't remember.

Robert Canning of IGN said, "there were too few laugh-out-loud moments in this lackluster episode. Overall, it was nice to see Lurleen again, but she'd probably get more laughs in future cameos than in carrying an entire episode." He gave the episode a 6/10. The opening sequence where Homer murders Grampa in a dream was criticized, being called "the least funny thing I've ever seen on the show" by IGN, and "very un-Homer-like" by TV Squad.

Genevieve Koski of The A.V. Club gave the episode a B+. She thought the episode was “pretty damn good”. She liked that the story focused on the Simpsons and Lurleen without having a subplot, and she said that the Dixie Chicks' appearance served a purpose rather than appearing just because of their fame.

In 2014, Priya Elan of The Guardian named the song "Daddy's Back" as one of the most underrated songs of the series. In 2015, the Dixie Chicks were named the 17th best musical guest of the series.
