= Thelma & Louise (musical) =

2026 stage musical

- Music: Neko Case
- Lyrics: Neko Case
- Book: Callie Khouri
- Basis: Thelma & Louise by Callie Khouri
- Premiere: 16 September 2026: Young Vic, London
- Productions: 2026 Off-West End

Thelma & Louise is a musical with music and lyrics by Neko Case and a book by Callie Khouri, based on her own screenplay for the 1991 film of the same name.

Directed by Trip Cullman, it premiered at the Young Vic in London in September 2026 with Amy Lennox as Thelma and Rachel Tucker as Louise.

== Background ==
Thelma & Louise was written by Callie Khouri, with direction by Trip Cullman. The Musical is based on the 1991 film of the same name, which also featured a screenplay by Khouri. The film followed Thelma and Louise, as they set out for a weekend vacation at a fishing cabin. After a man sexually assaults Thelma at a filling station, he is shot dead by Louise resulting in them becoming outlaws on the road. It premiered at the 44th Cannes Film Festival and received six nominations at the 64th Academy Awards, winning Best Original Screenplay for Khouri.

In June 2021, at a thirtieth anniversary screening of the film, Khouri revealed that a musical adaption was in development and intended for Broadway. At the time of the screening Halley Feiffer was attached to write the book for the musical, with Neko Case writing the music and lyrics and Trip Cullman was to direct.

In 2023, a workshop starring Amanda Seyfried as Thelma and Evan Rachel Wood took place in New York. By January 2025, Khouri was solely slated as writing the book for the musical. It was also revealed that the musical had been in development for nine years, and had been delayed by the COVID-19 pandemic.

In April 2026, the musical was officially confirmed with the news that it would premiere at the Young Vic as part of their 2026/27 season. The original production featured scenic design by Christine Jones and Brett J. Banakis, costume design by Ryan Dawson Laight, lighting by Natasha Chivers, and choreography by Bobbi Jene Smith and Or Schraiber. In addition to music and lyrics by Chase additional music was completed by Carl Newman, Paul Rigby and Zoe Sarnak, with arrangements by John Clancy and sound design by Gareth Owen.

== Production ==
The musical began previews at the Young Vic, London on 3 September 2026, ahead of an official opening night on 16 September, for a limited run until 24 October 2027. Lead casting included Amy Lennox as Thelma, Rachel Tucker as Louise, Trevor Dion Nicholas as Hal and Jordan Luke Gage as JD. The Young Vic co-produced the premiere with Sonia Friedman Productions, in association with MGM On Stage.

Cullman's staging and Jones and Banakis design keept the action on a single set representing a roadside bar, which opens near the end to show a painted Grand Canyon. The film's Ford Thunderbird appears only as an overturned wreck at the very beginning of the musical, at end of opening number "A Story of Two Little Girls", foreshadowing the events to come; Natasha Chivers's lighting is used to suggest the road and headlights.

== Cast ==
Character	London
Character	2026
Thelma	Amy Lennox
Louise	Rachel Tucker
Hal	Trevor Dion Nicholas
JD	Jordan Luke Gage
Darryl	Samuel Edwards
Jimmy	Alex Gibson-Giorgio
Sarah	Letitia Hector
Harlan / Max	Tamlyn Henderson
Trooper / Singer	Jack Butterworth

== Critical reception ==
Thelma & Louise received mixed reviews. Lennox and Tucker were praised, while the score divided opinion and several reviewers found the pacing slow.
