= Doctors and Nurses (TV series) =

- Genre: Sitcom
- Written by: Phil Hammond; Nigel Smith
- Directed by: Caroline Jeffries
- Starring: Joanna Scanlan; Adrian Edmondson; Madhav Sharma; Mina Anwar; David Mitchell; Abigail Cruttenden; Steven Alvey; Susan Earl; Geoffrey McGivern; Audrey Ardington
- Theme music composer: Nick Harvey
- Country of origin: United Kingdom
- Original language: English
- No. of seasons: 1
- No. of episodes: 6

Production
- Executive producers: Jon Plowman; Jonathan Powell
- Producer: Julian Meers
- Production location: Carlton Studios
- Editor: Barry Osment
- Running time: 30 minutes
- Production company: Carlton Television

Original release
- Network: BBC One
- Release: 13 January – 17 February 2004

Doctors and Nurses is a British television sitcom written by Nigel Smith and Dr. Phil Hammond, focusing on the fraught relationship between two orthopaedic surgeons, set in a hospital on the Isle of Wight.

It starred Adrian Edmondson, Mina Anwar and David Mitchell, and aired six episodes on BBC One from 13 January to 17 February 2004. The series was neither a critical nor a commercial success, and did not return for a second series. Edmondson did go on to play a similar doctor role in the non-comic hospital drama Holby City.

Phil Hammond appeared as a neurosurgeon in episode three.

== Cast ==
- Roy Glover – Adrian Edmondson
- George Banatwala – Madhav Sharma
- Toby Stephens – David Mitchell
- Lucy Potter – Abigail Cruttenden
- Zita Khan – Mina Anwar
- Walt – Geoffrey McGivern
- Tara Cummings – Susan Earl
- Flapper – Steven Alvey
- Stumpy Yates – Joanna Scanlan
