= Smoke on the Daughter =

- The Simpsons episode
- Episode no.: Season 19; Episode 15
- Directed by: Lance Kramer
- Written by: Billy Kimball
- Production code: KABF08
- Original air date: March 30, 2008

Episode features
- Couch gag: Wile E. Coyote paints a fake couch on the wall which the Simpsons run into except for Maggie, who sticks her tongue out and takes off, Road-Runner style. The remaining family members sit on the couch except for Homer, who falls through the wall and yells, "D'oh!"
- Commentary: Al Jean; Ian Maxtone-Graham; Billy Kimball; Matt Selman; Dana Gould; Tom Gammill; Max Pross; Lance Kramer; David Silverman

Episode chronology
← Previous "Dial 'N' for Nerder"	Next → "Papa Don't Leech"
- The Simpsons season 19

"Smoke on the Daughter" is the fifteenth episode of the nineteenth season of the American animated television series The Simpsons. It originally aired on the Fox network in the United States on March 30, 2008. The episode is the only one of the series in which Billy Kimball received sole writing credit, and it was directed by Lance Kramer.

In this episode, Lisa becomes a ballerina at an academy and discovers her natural talent is enhanced by second hand cigarette smoke. Meanwhile, Homer shows Bart his secret room where he has secretly been making beef jerky and is torn when a family of raccoons steals it. During the first broadcast, the episode was watched by 7.14 million viewers, and it received mixed reviews.

== Plot ==
The Simpson family goes to the midnight sale of the last book in the Angelica Button series. Going home, Lisa summarizes the book, so the Simpsons throw their books away. At home, they watch television where Marge sees a commercial for the Chazz Busby Ballet Academy and tells Lisa that she always wanted to become a ballerina. Lisa encourages her to audition, and Busby lets her become a student. Later, when Marge suffers a leg cramp, Busby dismissed her. As Lisa argues with Busby, he notices she has naturally perfect posture and asks her to join his academy. Marge accepts on Lisa's behalf. Meanwhile, Homer introduces Bart to a secret room in the basement where Homer has been making beef jerky.

At class, Lisa performs poorly. While on break, Lisa learns the other students smoke cigarettes to stay focused. She accidentally inhales smoke from their cigarettes and performs better. She deduces that secondhand smoke makes her excel. That night, Lisa has a dream where her older self and feminist heroines encourage her to smoke. Meanwhile, when Homer and Bart try to sell their jerky to Apu, they find it missing. They discover that a family of raccoons took their jerky. When Homer tries to kill them, he discovers that their family looks like his own, and he cannot bring himself to do it. Later, while driving Lisa to ballet practice, Lisa starts suspecting that Marge is living her dream through Lisa. During a windy break, Lisa cannot inhale any smoke from the others. Realizing she must smoke a cigarette, she picks one up, but Homer arrives and stops her from smoking it.

Appalled at his daughter's smoking, he wants to tell Marge that Lisa needs to removed from the academy, but Homer cannot destroy Marge's happiness when he sees her pride. He orders Lisa to quit smoking. Later, Bart informs Homer when he sees Lisa second hand smoking. At Lisa's ballet recital, Homer uses a raccoon to enter the changing room and steal all the cigarettes. On stage, the ballerinas go out of control, and Lisa tells the audience that ballet is a dangerous practice for children and quits, prompting Busby to leave. Lisa overcomes her smoke addiction using children's nicotine patches. Marge learns she should not live her dreams through her children, but Homer continues to force his dream to become a Mexican wrestler on Bart.

== Cultural references ==
The couch gag is a parody of the 1949-1966 Warner Bros. Wile E. Coyote and the Road Runner cartoons directed by Chuck Jones. The opening Angelica Button segment is a parody of the fanfare surrounding the Harry Potter novel series. Chazz Busby is designed to resemble Bob Fosse, who directed the 1979 semi-autobiographical film All That Jazz.

When Bart emerges from the dumpster, eavesdropping on Lisa to see if she's smoking, his face is camouflaged and "The End" by The Doors plays in the background. This is a parody of the scene in the 1979 film Apocalypse Now in which Willard emerges from the water camouflaged, about to kill Colonel Kurtz, with the same music playing.

In the scene where Homer has one of the raccoons sneak into the ballerina’s locker room to steal their cigarettes, the music that plays in the background is an inverted version of the opening theme from The Pink Panther.

== Reception ==
=== Viewing figures ===
The episode earned a 2.5 rating and was watched by 7.14 million viewer, which was the 40th most-watched show that week.

=== Critical response ===
Richard Keller of TV Squad stated that he enjoyed the week's episode, but commented that it "wasn't as strong as the previous two." Robert Canning of IGN thought that the episode was good and that it "started off very, very strongly" but commented that it seemed to lose its comedic pace as it progressed. He particularly enjoyed the episode's couch gag, stating that "It was a great reminder of the early, innocent days of cartoon comedy but with a modern Simpsons twist". He gave the episode a 7.2/10.

Genevieve Koski of The A.V. Club gave the episode a B. She wrote that the episode "was exceedingly familiar, but it provided the framework for some pretty decent gags" such as Marge's box of shattered dreams.

On Four Finger Discount, Brendan Dando and Guy Davis thought the episode was "unfocused" and had no "emotional payoff".

In 2014, Chris Morgan of Paste ranked the episode as the second-worst episode of the series, saying that the main plot involving Lisa smoking was "particularly bad" and that the family of raccoons that look like the Simpson family was "too cartoonish". Conversely, in 2024, Rich Knight of CinemaBlend named the episode as one of the 15 best episodes featuring Lisa.
