= The Wright Way =

British TV sitcom (BBC, 2013)

- Genre: Sitcom
- Written by: Ben Elton
- Directed by: Dewi Humphreys
- Starring: David Haig; Mina Anwar; Luke Gell; Toby Longworth; Beattie Edmondson
- Country of origin: United Kingdom
- Original language: English
- No. of series: 1
- No. of episodes: 6

Production
- Executive producers: Gregor Sharp; Lucy Ansbro
- Producers: Ben Elton; Rohan Acharya
- Production location: dock10 studios
- Production company: Phil McIntyre Television

Original release
- Network: BBC One
- Release: 23 April – 28 May 2013

The Wright Way is a British television sitcom written by Ben Elton which aired on BBC One from 23 April to 28 May 2013. It concerns a health and safety manager, his staff and his family. Widely panned by critics, it was cancelled after one series.

== Plot ==
The series centres around Gerald Wright, manager of the health and safety department of the fictional Baselricky Council implied to be in Essex. Wright's team includes Malika Maha (Mina Anwar), Clive Beeches (Luke Gell), and Bernard Stanning (Toby Longworth). His family includes daughter Susan and her girlfriend Victoria, and ex-wife Valerie.

== Characters ==
- Gerald Wright (David Haig) – a middle aged divorcee who is the Chief Health and Safety officer for Baselricky Borough Council. He takes his job very seriously, and appears diligent, although slightly paranoid about the 'dangers' of everyday situations. His ex-wife Valerie left him, after they had been married for over twenty years, because she could not take his 'stick-to-the-rules' persona any longer. He lives with his daughter Susan and her girlfriend Victoria. He appears to have been deeply affected by the divorce, and Susan correctly deduces that his anxiety and anger over simple things is a mask to cover his depression caused by the end of his marriage. Also, although he clearly loves his only child Susan very much, he describes her coming out as a lesbian as a 'lifestyle bombshell' and he may secretly be slightly uncomfortable by his daughter's homosexuality. He argues a lot with Susan's live-in girlfriend Victoria, but deep down he has grown to love her like a second daughter.
- Susan Wright (Joanne Matthews) – Gerald's 23-year-old daughter. Since the divorce of her parents and her mother moving out, the responsibility of running the house has fallen to Susan, and she is now responsible for food shopping, paying bills, working as a plumber and looking after her equally invalid father and girlfriend. She plays the 'straight man' in comparison to Gerald's neurotic behaviour and Victoria's naivety. However, she clearly loves her father very much, and is shown to be very much in love with Victoria, despite her being far less intelligent than Susan. Also, Susan is shown to care very much for her mother, and tries to make her see that her new Australian boyfriend Kyle is just using her for her divorce settlement money.
- Victoria (Beattie Edmondson) – Susan's 19-year old, incompetent girlfriend. She is a disc jockey, although she gets very little work and has been mockingly nicknamed 'DJ No-Gigs' by people on the internet. She is quite posh compared to Susan and Gerald, yet she is openly in love with Susan, and has developed emotional attachment to Gerald.
- Valerie Wright (Kacey Ainsworth) - Gerald's ex-wife.

== Production ==
The Wright Way was commissioned by BBC One Controller Danny Cohen and Controller of BBC Comedy Commissioning Cheryl Taylor. It was originally to be titled Slings and Arrows, until it was decided viewers would mistake the title for a historical documentary. An alternative working title was ...Gone Mad, a play on the cliché saying "It's health and safety gone mad".

The series was filmed at dock10, MediaCityUK in Salford, Greater Manchester from January to March 2013 and broadcast on the BBC.

It was revealed in Ben Elton's autobiography that the series was initially developed as a vehicle for Rik Mayall.

== Episodes ==
| No. | Title | Directed by | Written by | Original release date |
|---|---|---|---|---|
| 1 | "The Rogue Speed Bump" | Dewi Humphreys | Ben Elton | 23 April 2013 |
| 2 | "Conkers Bonkers" | Dewi Humphreys | Ben Elton | 30 April 2013 |
| 3 | "Lethal Swing Back" | Dewi Humphreys | Ben Elton | 7 May 2013 |
| 4 | "Concealed Sharp Objects" | Dewi Humphreys | Ben Elton | 14 May 2013 |
| 5 | "Curbing the Kerb" | Dewi Humphreys | Ben Elton | 21 May 2013 |
| 6 | "The Deadly Receptacle" | Dewi Humphreys | Ben Elton | 28 May 2013 |

== Reception ==
Critics heavily panned the first episode. The second episode was heavily criticised by Tom Phillips in the New Statesman, who found it to be even worse than the first. Adam Postans in the Daily Mirror called it 'the worst sitcom ever'. Oliver Nagel of German blog britcoms.de included it in an article on "The Shitcoms of the year", commenting: "Worst. Sitcom. Ever.", "Gags that can hardly be described as such, dogmatism that speculates on approving laughter, gruesome characters - really everything is wrong here" and "With 'The Wright Way' Ben Elton has reached the very bottom."

Ben Elton himself later reflected on the series during an interview for BBC Radio 2's Steve Wright in the Afternoon the following year, commenting that "...Sometimes you can pull it out of the hat, and sometimes you can't. Blackadder was initially drubbed and set to be cancelled, and that went on to become one of the British comedy greats; with this one (The Wright Way) it just never really found its niche. I'd originally envisaged it as a bit more of an alternative, BBC Two jobby, but I'm not sure Auntie [the BBC] and I were ever totally in tune with each others view on what it was going to be. On hindsight I don't think it was packaged very well, maybe not titled very well, nobody knew quite what it was. A shame, but that's the business we're in."

== See also ==
- List of television series considered the worst
