= List of Scallywagga episodes =

The following is a list of episodes from the BBC television show Scallywagga.

== Pilot (2008) ==
No. overall	No. in series	Title	Directed by	Written by	Original release date
0	0	""Spacehopper""	Alex Hardcastle	Stuart Kenworthy	21 March 2007
In the series pilot, a group of innovatively immature teenagers cause trouble around the city of Manchester.

== Series 1 (2008) ==
No. overall	No. in series	Title	Directed by	Written by	Original release date
1	1	"Episode One"	Tony Dow	Stuart Kenworthy	29 April 2008
Sketch 1 – Man 'running' a marathon decides to get a bike. Sketch 2 – Check this out! Two characters compare their mobile phones, one having the ability to pause time. Sketch 3 – I drink... Sketch 4 – Adrian's parents educate the viewers about the dangers of motorbikes, then gives Adrian one for his birthday. Sketch 5 – I got suspended for... Sketch 6 – Character spends nearly three hours straightening her hair, only to sneeze and have it mess up. Sketch 7 – Dad educates son about how he was created, and why he needs a sample of his hair. Sketch 8 – Bazz show's the viewers 'his' crib. Sketch 9 – Do you think she really likes me? Sketch 10 – Bazz continues the tour of 'his' crib. Sketch 11 – Man humiliates partner by taking a photo of her in labour by the roadside. Sketch 12 – ASBO Pin is introduced, causing problems in a local convenience store. Sketch 13 – Scout's leader shows members how to roll a spliff. Sketch 14 – Bazz continues the tour of his crib, of coarse after he breaks down the door. Bazz enters his room to find friend Smeg in his bed. Sketch 15 – Adrian's parents educate the viewers about the dangers of skateboards, much to Adrian's despair. Sketch 16 – Character tells the viewers that laughter is the best medicine, only to have a child sneeze on her. Sketch 17 – I do... Sketch 18 – Big Ed's catchphrase "a-chilly-mondo" is spread across the school, causing havoc for the teachers. Sketch 19 – Dad scares the children to sleep. Sketch 20 – If you could make one thing illegal, what could it be? Characters answer this question. Sketch 21 – Tissa does not like working with animals. Sketch 22 – ASBO pin returns, along to the song "2-4-6-8" by band Motorway. Sketch 23 – Adrian's parents decided to evict him from the family home. Sketch 24 – Girlfriend has high hopes for a special birthday present from her boyfriend. Sketch 25 – Big Ed's catchphrase "a-chilly-mondo" continues to cause havoc for the teachers. Sketch 26 – A couple are hoping to have sex, however the girl does not feel ready. Sketch 27 – Character tells the viewers that you get what you give. Sketch 28 – School kids answer a question asked by their teacher. Sketch 29 – A man dressed in uniform comes to sweep his girlfriend off of her feet, much to his disappointment. Sketch 30 – School kids continue answer the question asked by their teacher. Sketch 31 – The disappointed man adds to his humiliation by riding his bike home. Sketch 32 – School kids discover the answer, only to find out that their answers have all been incorrect. Sketch 33 – Adian attempts to interact with family, not all goes to plan.
2	2	"Episode Two"	Tony Dow	Stuart Kenworthy	6 May 2008
Sketch 1 – Dad stands outside of a store with his son begging for money. Sketch 2 – Dean does not know how to fish. Sketch 3 – This weekend I'm going to... Sketch 4 – Big Ed's catchphrase "a-chilly-mondo" continues to cause havoc for the teachers. Sketch 5 – Dad tells son why they are selling their Dog's kennel. Sketch 6 – Dean still does not know how to fish. Sketch 7 – Adrian's family act as the Dragons Den when he tells them about his plans to go to university. Sketch 8 – ASBO Pin guesses what ice creams children want. Sketch 9 – Tony Gardener makes a huge deal over dinner. Sketch 10 – Interactive hairstyling. Sketch 11 – After an argument, the school couple make up thanks to the help of Big Ed's catchphrase "a-chilly-mondo". Sketch 12 – A Group of students buy drugs at a Drive Thru. Sketch 13 – Character tells the viewers that God helps those who help themselves. Yet again, not all goes to plan. Sketch 14 – School girl Emily does not feel well. Sketch 15 – Gaz and Garry introduce themselves to two girls at the bar. Sketch 16 – A fortune teller tells the story of Auntie Susan to a customer. Sketch 17 – I look up/down to him because... Sketch 18 – ASBO Pin guy returns at a strip club. Sketch 19 – Emily still does not feel well, and has since turned blue. Mr Green must revive her. She suddenly feels well. Sketch 20 – Tony Gardener makes a big deal of putting the Kettle on. Sketch 21 – Dean has finally gotten his clothes sorted out for fishing, however still does not know how to fish. Sketch 22 – Big Ed's catchphrase "a-chilly-mondo" at the Drive Thru; Sketch 23 – A fortune teller tells the story of Gran to her customers. Sketch 24 – If you could do one song on Karaoke, what would it be? Sketch 25 – The year ten's hold an assembly mocking the headteacher. Sketch 26 – Tony Gardener makes a big deal over nothing yet again. Sketch 27 – A fortune teller tells the story of Granny, Big Ed's catchphrase "a-chilly-mondo". Sketch 28 – The couple once again prepare for sex. Sketch 29 – Emily still does not feel well, and has come down with a 'case' of Scarlet Fever. Sketch 30 – Dean is back for fishing, and still has not grasped the concept of fishing. Sketch 31 – The men at a garage attract the attention of a stalker.
3	3	"Episode Three"	Tony Dow	Stuart Kenworthy	13 May 2008
Sketch 1 – After dinner the couple go to collect their 'coats'. Sketch 2 – Man at the Job Centre apply for a job as a spaceman. A spaceman who washes cars that is. Sketch 3 – I drive... Sketch 4 – Dad teaches son about betting on a horse race. Sketch 5 – Big Ed's catchphrase "a-chilly-mondo" continues to cause havoc for the teachers. Sketch 6 – A character tells us that an apple a day keeps the doctor away. Only to attract the attention of a 'doctor'. Sketch 7 – Adrian and his family play Monopoly. His chance card states that he must live in the garden for six months. Sketch 8 – The couple suffer problems with the echo. Sketch 9 – A man returns to a store after buying a product. Sketch 10 – The couple suffer problems with the feedback. Sketch 11 – I earn my cash... Sketch 12 – Factory workers, Rachiel and Julie discuss hounding. Sketch 13 – ASBO pin returns, this time in a book shop. Sketch 14 – Factory workers, Rachiel discuss hounding. Sketch 15 – Student, Daniel Webster, gives a poem about history to the school. Sketch 16 – Workers at a store confuse the sound of the phone for the fire alarm. Sketch 17 – Friends put together party bags for a 5 year old, consisting of lighters, vodka and poppers. Sketch 18 – The couple are in bed. Sketch 19 – Bazz and Smeg are questioned by the barman. Sketch 20 – Kerry gives Nazz a huge ball of hair from the shower. Sketch 21 – Boyfriend finds his way to his girlfriend's clitoris on his satnav. Sketch 22 – Garage workers sing the theme tune to Balamory. Sketch 23 – Boyfriend continues to find his way to his girlfriend's clitoris. Sketch 24 – Party-goer does not understand how to use a bong. Sketch 25 – Smeg, and Bazz are at a party. Sketch 26 – Party-goer does not understand a tequila slammer. Sketch 27 – Bazz enters the chill out room, literally.
4	4	"Episode Four"	Tony Dow	Stuart Kenworthy	20 May 2008
Sketch 1 – Character "Greggs Girl" is introduced. Bazz attracts the attention of a Hawk Sketch 2 – It's Halloween, and characters knock at the wrong house. Sketch 3 – Boyfriend feels that girlfriend is ashamed of him. Sketch 4 – Police officers recite the rights. Sketch 5 – Surfers attract the attention of a Hawk. Sketch 6 – School student, Linda, gives a poem about P.E. Sketch 7 – The police officer is still perfecting his arresting rights. Sketch 8 – Girl is dancing for peace. Sketch 9 – Character makes origami art in a not-so-convenient location. Sketch 10 – Dad tells son about why his Aunt Pam does not come round any more. Sketch 11 – ASBO Pin returns, this time stood at a cash point. Sketch 12 – The couple are at the hospital, Greggs Girl makes an entrance. Sketch 13 – Smeg and Bazz are at the park, Smeg asks Bazz about STD's. Sketch 14 – Girl is still dancing for peace and has attracted a crowd. Sketch 15 – Peter Turner is at a Job interview, the boss checks Peter's facebook page and finds that Peter is not who he says he is however due to a virtual fortune cookie, gets the job. Sketch 16 – Smeg and Bazz are at the park. Wondering who Smeg caught his STD from. Sketch 17 – Lennie is playing football and gets distracted by his Dad. Sketch 18 – Police Officer is chasing a criminal and passes out. Sketch 19 – Character is making Origami, again at a inconvenient time. Sketch 20 – ASBO Pin announces the news reporter's PIN on Live TV. Sketch 21 – Lennie's Dad accidentally cuts of his leg with his light saver. Sketch 22 – If you won the lottery, what would you spend it on? Sketch 23 – It's exam time at School, and the teacher is announcing the list of prohibited equipment. Sketch 24 – Daddy is playing Simon Says with children. Sketch 25 – Emergency Services has come to a man who has overdosed on Pear Drops. Sketch 26 – Oragami 'Swan'. Sketch 27 – ASBO Pin guesses the heart rate of a patient. Sketch 28 – A police officer and his girlfriend are about to have sex. Sketch 29 – The couple are planning to have sex, or are they? Sketch 30 – The Police Officer is walking home as he cannot remember the arresting rights. Sketch 31 – The Greggs Girl appears at a school examination room. Sketch 32 – Adrian's family leave him in a cemetery with his Granny Edna.
5	5	"Episode Five"	Tony Dow	Stuart Kenworthy	27 May 2008
Sketch 1 – A teenager asks an adult to buy alcohol for him. Sketch 2 – A woman shows two men around a building site. Sketch 3 – I sleep on... Sketch 4 – Sketch 2 continues. Sketch 5 – Dad retells the story of his uncle terry's suicide. Sketch 6 – Bazz and Smeg play a game of conkers, much to their embarrassment. Sketch 7 – A friend asks his friend about last night. You know what I'm talking about. Sketch 8 – Smeg goes hunting for conkers. Sketch 9 – Mandy and her little sister play hide and seek. Sketch 10 – School teacher confiscates chewing gum from a pupil to make a sculpture. Sketch 11 – Smeg and Bazz continue their game of conkers. Sketch 12 – Mandy tries another trick to find the kids. Sketch 13 – ASBO Pin is up to his old tricks. Sketch 14 – Two teenagers are in the park, discussing art. Sketch 15 – What did I come in here for? Sketch 16 – The repossession men. Sketch 17 – A man asks a woman whether buses or trains are better. Sketch 18 – Mandy tries another trick to find the kids. Sketch 19 – A cyclist takes the fence. Sketch 20 – Two kids find a treasure map. Sketch 21 – If you were rein-carted as an animal, what would you be? Sketch 22 – Two teenagers steal education. Sketch 23 – A couple buy a car. Sketch 24 – The teenagers are back. Sketch 25 – School kids sing "10 green bottles". Sketch 26 – Two repo men come for the DJ. Sketch 27 – School kids sing "10 green bottles", with help from ASBO Pin. Sketch 28 – Gregs girl confronts two teenagers. Sketch 29 – A couple are getting ready for sex. Sketch 30 – A woman asks Adrian's parents about any accidents and injuries.
6	6	"Episode Six"	Tony Dow	Stuart Kenworthy	3 June 2008
Sketch 1 – A Goth couple go out shopping. Sketch 2 – A security guard shows the viewers around the shopping centre and tells us how he gets rid of teenagers. Sketch 3 – Gregg's girl appears in a children's centre. Sketch 4 – Dad tells son about the time he went dogging. Sketch 5 – A woman asks people about any accidents and injuries. Sketch 6 – Two people steal from an allotment. Sketch 7 – Sketch 5 continues. Sketch 8 – The school holds and assembly on drug use. Sketch 9 – The security guard imposes ways to get rid of teenagers. Sketch 10 – A man plays an invisible guitar. Sketch 11 – ASBO Pin returns. Sketch 12 – A friend discusses ways that he humiliates Carl Webster. Sketch 13 – A group of teenagers make a club. Sketch 14 – Two friends decide to rent a film. Sketch 15 – A couple play Frisbee in the park. Sketch 16 – Two friends continue to decide on their film to rent. Sketch 17 – Sketch 15 continues. Sketch 18 – The manager of the store complains to the security guard. Sketch 19 – A girl works in a coffee shop for her work experience. Sketch 20 – Two friends continue to decide on their film to rent. Sketch 21 – ASBO Pin plays a game of bingo. Sketch 22 – A group of friends share potatoes. Sketch 23 – A police officer arrests a spraypainter, Greggs Girl makes an appearance. Sketch 24 – A Headmistress holds an assembly. Sketch 25 – The teenagers take advantage of the security guard's day off. Sketch 26 – Party time, girls quee for the privilege of crying on the stairs. Sketch 27 – Don't worry, I can be super quick! Sketch 28 – I am so drunk... Sketch 29 – Adrian's parents need help with lighting the barbecue.

== Series 2 (2010) ==
No. overall	No. in series	Title	Directed by	Written by	Original release date
7	1	"Episode One"	David Sant	Stuart Kenworthy	23 February 2010
Sketch 1 – A group of girls are playing a game of basketball, but without the ball. Sketch 2 – A teacher educates students about trust. Sketch 3 – A woman attends a job interview with skills in tree identification. Sketch 4 – Adrian's parents have a special surprise for him. Sketch 5 – Darren's mother embarrasses him. Sketch 6 – A man tells us about the increasing number of chiefs on the estate. Sketch 7 – ASBO pin returns at a Hair Salon. Sketch 8 – A police officer interviews an offender and uses a special interrogation method. Sketch 9 – Adrian's family prepare for a holiday. Sketch 10 – A couple visit a restaurant and encounter a very strange waitress. Sketch 11 – At a wedding, the bride's friend reads a poem. Sketch 12 – Collin visits his doctor. Sketch 13 – Darren's mother embarrasses him again. Sketch 14 – A teacher educates students about self image. Sketch 15 – A woman encounters a strange member of staff when visiting a shoe store. Sketch 16 – Mr. Turner, a rap artist, visits a job centre. Sketch 17 – Characters answer the question of "What is your favourite sex position?" Sketch 18 – A teacher talks about free will. Sketch 19 – The naked police officer warns two spray painters. Sketch 20 – Collin is asked for evidence in court. Sketch 21 – A man visits a strip club. Sketch 22 – A woman asks pedestrians a questionnaire.
8	2	"Episode Two"	David Sant	Stuart Kenworthy	2 March 2010
Sketch 1 – A charity worker visits Adrian's house. Sketch 2 – Max and Leanne role play, accident and injury style. Sketch 3 – ASBO Pin helps a woman who cannot remember her pin. Sketch 4 – A rap artist gets confronted by a police officer. Sketch 5 – A speed dating couple talk about what they want in a relationship. Sketch 6 – Adrian wakes up in a charity shop. Sketch 7 – A charity worker teaches people how it's done. Sketch 8 – John, the naked police officer, is called into the office over a complaint. Sketch 9 – Sarah meets someone at the speed dating, she is invited round to his house. Sketch 10 – A careers advisor talks to a cleaner in the toilets. Sketch 11 – The charity workers are out in the street. Sketch 12 – Clive Cocks, an astronaut, is given training. Sketch 13 – The charity workers come into competition with other charity workers. Sketch 14 – Tony Gardener visits a restaurant. Sketch 15 – A teacher talks to students about the power of language. Sketch 16 – Characters answer the question "What is your ideal first date?" Sketch 17 – Kirsty gives a poem to mourners at a funeral. Sketch 18 – School pupil visits the nurse after an accident involving the teacher. Sketch 19 – A man visits a strip club. Sketch 20 – ASBO Pin helps another person remember their pin number.
9	3	"Episode Three"	David Sant	Stuart Kenworthy	9 March 2010
Sketch 1 – Adrian plays golf with his Dad. Sketch 2 – Collin is introduced to his girlfriend's parents. Sketch 3 – A school teacher talks about The Man. Sketch 4 – ASBO Pin flirts with a man at the book store. Sketch 5 – Clive Cocks continues his training. Sketch 6 – A woman visits a clothes store and is insulted by the staff. Sketch 7 – ASBO Pin has coffee with the man at the book store. Sketch 8 – The Careers Advisor harasses another student. Sketch 9 – A charity worker educates people about handing out newspapers. Sketch 10 – Tony Gardener is not up for water world. Sketch 11 – Clive Cocks continues his astronaut training. Sketch 12 – A group of friends visit a strip club. Sketch 13 – Tony Gardener is told what to wear. Sketch 14 – Two friends visit a clothes shop and are offended by two members of staff. Sketch 15 – The charity workers are still mastering the face. Sketch 16 – Kirsty reads a poem at a blessing. Sketch 17 – Characters answer the question "What's your greatest fear?" Sketch 18 – Adrian and his family go swimming. Sketch 19 – A man is offended by a member of staff in a phone shop. Sketch 20 – A couple are discussing noises that they make during sex.
10	4	"Episode Four"	David Sant	Stuart Kenworthy	16 March 2010
Sketch 1 – Clive Cocks continues his space training. Sketch 2 – The Police hold a press conference on Drugs. Sketch 3 – Another customer is harassed by two members of staff at a clothes store. Sketch 4 – It's Adrian's birthday, and his parents have left him a DVD of them on holiday. Sketch 5 – Tony Gardener is told to watch his fingers. Sketch 6 – A School Teacher talks to the students with the Mayor. Sketch 7 – Brian makes a bad impression. Sketch 8 – A woman goes to the information desk in the shopping centre. Sketch 9 – Darren is embarrassed by his mother. Sketch 10 – Adrian and his family visit a counsiler. Sketch 11 – The shop assistants visit a fortune teller. Sketch 12 – Brian makes a bad impression. Sketch 13 – The naked police man talks to a shoplifter. Sketch 14 – Two farm workers talk about horses. Sketch 15 – A group of friends visit a strip club. Sketch 16 – Characters answer the question "What book should you have written?" Sketch 17 – Brian visits a fortune teller. Sketch 18 – A woman visits a hair salon and is insulted by a member of staff. Sketch 19 – A man visits a car dealership.
11	5	"Episode Five"	David Sant	Stuart Kenworthy	23 March 2010
Sketch 1 – A woman, who does not own a dog, picks up dog mess. Sketch 2 – Brian visits a club. Sketch 3 – Sketch 1 continues. Sketch 4 – A man is offended by a member of staff. Sketch 5 – Sketch 1 continues. Sketch 6 – The careers advisor calls a student's parents into school. Sketch 7 – Darren is embarrassed once again. Sketch 8 – I think there's something missing. Sketch 9 – Brian celebrates the birth of their baby. Sketch 10 – Kelly is once again fired from her job. Sketch 11 – Julia wins an award for bravery. Kirsty reads a poem. Sketch 12 – A woman mis-interprets vandalism. Sketch 13 – A teacher talks about exams. Sketch 14 – Tony Gardener is surprised. Sketch 15 – Alice meets someone who shares her passion of dog mess collection. Sketch 16 – Kelly has a new job handing out leaflets. Sketch 17 – Kelly and her boyfriend prepare for safe sex. Sketch 18 – Characters answer the question "What is a Scallywagga?"; Sketch 19 – Kirsty introduces her boyfriend to her parents. Sketch 20 – Kelly finally finds a job where her annoying attitude is welcomed. Sketch 21 – A hair stylist offers a pensioner drugs. Sketch 22 – A woman asks what meat is in the kebab.
12	6	"Episode Six"	David Sant	Stuart Kenworthy	30 March 2010
Sketch 1 – A charity worker teachers workers how to count traffic. Sketch 2 – Clive Cocks is completing his space training. Sketch 3 – School teacher is educating students about self defence. Sketch 4 – A careers advisor meets a student who wants to become a careers advisor. Sketch 5 – Two staff members are offended by "Gok Wan". Sketch 6 – Tony Gardener is spoken to by his brother. Sketch 7 – Two college friends meet up. Sketch 8 – A Sunday school teacher discusses zombie Jesus. Sketch 9 – Kirsty reads another one of her poems, this time to a five-year-old. Sketch 10 – A school teacher visits a fortune teller. Sketch 11 – She talks on and on... Sketch 12 – Sarah and Jezz go out for coffee. Sketch 13 – ASBO Pin returns. Sketch 14 – Characters are asked "What alcoholic drink would you be?" Sketch 15 – A customer complains when she feels offended by a staff member. Sketch 16 – The girl who will not stop talking visits a fortune teller. Sketch 17 – All characters from series 2 come together in a launderette. ASBO pin walks out of the launderette naked.
