= Razzledazzle =

Children's series produced for CBeebies

- Genre: Children's television series Education
- Written by: Philip Hawthorn; Tracey Hammett; Bethen Marlow; Steve Cannon
- Directed by: Justine Hallside; Champa Swift; Emyr Roberts (voice); Siân Telfi (for Siânco)
- Starring: Patrick Lynch; Sarah Hope; Bethen Marlow; Mina Anwar; Rachel Scorgie (Welsh version)
- Theme music composer: Ben Lee Delisle
- Ending theme: The "Not So Long Song"
- Composer: Ben Lee Delisle
- Country of origin: United Kingdom
- Original language: English
- No. of series: 1
- No. of episodes: 20

Production
- Executive producer: Clare Elstow
- Producer: Steve Cannon
- Cinematography: Unknown
- Camera setup: Nigel Powell; Bart Baker
- Running time: 20 minutes per episode (approx.)
- Production company: BBC In-House Children's Production (Note: Animation production by The Hive.)

Original release
- Network: CBeebies; BBC Two
- Release: 14 February – 11 March 2005

Razzledazzle is a British live action/animated television programme for children ages three to seven that aired on CBeebies & BBC Two between February and March 2005. It was an educational show that featured Razzledazzle, an orange CGI creature with two floppy ears and two big brown eyes, voiced by Bethen Marlow. The first episode, Kitty, originally aired on 14 February 2005 at 9:20 am.

== Series overview ==
The programme itself was designed to get viewers to focus on sound. By riding magical slides directly from a blue-screen base, Razzledazzle visited four different areas, "Rhyme Time", "Chit Chat", "Bish! Bash! Bosh!" and "Once Upon A Tale".

Rhyme Time, always presented by Sarah Hope, invites audiences to recognise an everyday sound, which is then set to a poem and often repeated, allowing for interaction (hence why Razzledazzle usually says "Why don't you say it too?") to encourage reciting.

Chit Chat features some children involved in activities with their relations, focusing on natural communication skills.

Bish! Bash! Bosh! features a group of children acting out simple rhymes and sequences, sometimes set to music and beat. These rhymes are normally repeated once (hence why Razzledazzle says "Come on! Join in!") to encourage rhythm, syllables and rhyme.

Finally, "Once Upon a Tale", presented alternately by Mina Anwar and Patrick Lynch, is designed to create short stories using predictive and repetitive elements, widening the viewer's vocabulary and allowing for plenty of physicalisation of the narrator.

At the end of the programme, Razzledazzle, the kids who appeared in the "Bish Bash Bosh", "Chit Chat", and "Once Upon a Tale" sections of the programme and the presenters from the "Rhyme Time" and the "Once Upon a Tale" segments perform The "Not So Long Song", composed by Ben Lee Delisle. Ten episodes at a time are usually aired for four hours during the early morning within the BBC Schools slot.

== Episodes ==
Twenty 20-minute episodes of Razzledazzle, which aired on BBC Two, CBeebies and within BBC Schools' output were produced. The series mixes CGI animation and live action.

In addition, some of the extras in the television series are produced using 2D Flash Animation. Most of the show (excluding the introduction) is filmed in front of a green screen, so that the host can communicate with the animated character. The "Chit Chat" segments are filmed on location at the chosen child's home.

- 1. Kitty (14 February 2005)
- 2. Ruby Rabbit (15 February 2005)
- 3. Dennis The Donkey (16 February 2005)
- 4. Don't Wake the Baby (17 February 2005)
- 5. Carry Harri (18 February 2005)
- 6. Dog (21 February 2005)
- 7. Fisherman Tim (22 February 2005)
- 8. Marvellous Monster (23 February 2005)
- 9. Bibble Bobble (24 February 2005)
- 10. Not Another Puddle (25 February 2005)
- 11. Carlton's Magic Trainers (28 February 2005)
- 12. King Bling (1 March 2005)
- 13. Farmer Louise (2 March 2005)
- 14. Molly in the Trolley (3 March 2005)
- 15. Mrs Mickle (4 March 2005)
- 16. Unfortunately (7 March 2005)
- 17. The School Run (8 March 2005)
- 18. The Big Beastie Thing (9 March 2005)
- 19. Why the Moon is Made of Cheese (10 March 2005)
- 20. The Chugga Chugga Bus (11 March 2005, final episode)

== Awards ==
- Royal Television Society Educational Television Awards 2005

- Awarded Best Schools Programme – 0–5 Years (for the episode Drip Drop and Kitty)
