= The Unstoppable Yellow Yeti =

Animated series from Finland and France

- Genre: Comedy
- Created by: Anttu Harlin; Joonas Utti
- Developed by: Anttu Harlin; Joonas Utti; Craig Martin; Sam Dransfield
- Written by: Reid Harrison (#1–12A); Baljeet Rai (#11, 12B–25)
- Directed by: Joonas Utti
- Voices of: Trevor Dion Nicholas; Rasmus Hardiker; Amy-Leigh Hickman; Paul Tylak; Christopher Ragland; Harriet Carmichael
- Composers: Benjamin Nakache; Mathieu Rosenzweig
- Countries of origin: Finland; France; United Kingdom
- Original language: English
- No. of seasons: 1
- No. of episodes: 25 (49 segments)

Production
- Producers: Anttu Harlin; Benoit De Sabatino
- Editors: Andrew Ward; Kerttu Jaatinen
- Running time: 22 minutes (two 11-minute segments) (Note: Released as separate 11-minute episodes on Yle Areena.)
- Production companies: Gigglebug Entertainment; Zodiak Kids Studio France

Original release
- Network: Yle Areena (Finland); Disney Channel (France); Disney+ (UK)
- Release: 14 May – 18 December 2022

The Unstoppable Yellow Yeti (Finnish: Keltainen lumimies; French: L'incroyable Yellow Yeti) is an animated television series created by Anttu Harlin and Joonas Utti that aired on Disney Channel in France from 14 May to 18 December 2022, and released in Finland on Yle Areena from 1 July 2022 to 6 January 2023. The series is a co-production between Gigglebug Entertainment and Zodiak Kids Studio France, with the participation of Disney Channel and Yle for Walt Disney EMEA Productions Limited.

It is one of the last projects writer Reid Harrison was involved with, before his death on 15 January 2024.

== Premise ==
In the first episode, 12-year-old surfer boy Osmo is forced to leave his old life behind when he moves with his father to Winterton, a fictional village north of the Arctic Circle, where it snows all year round. Osmo and his cousin Rita meet a yellow yeti, named Gustav, and start to have adventures with him. The village has plenty of strict rules, including a ban on monsters. Rita's father, Roman Chrome, the village mayor, hates monsters. In order to hide from him, Gustav dresses up in different disguises. The series features many Finnish things like ice-swimming, May Day celebrations and crayfish parties, a fast food treat from Lappeenranta and bucket queues.

The main themes of the series are friendship and rebelling against the rules.

== Characters ==
- Gustav (voiced by Trevor Dion Nicholas)
- Osmo (voiced by Rasmus Hardiker)
- Rita (voiced by Amy-Leigh Hickman)
- Mayor Chrome (voiced by Paul Tylak)
- Ned (voiced by Christopher Ragland)
- Lydia (voiced by Harriet Carmichael)

== Production ==
Anttu Harlin and Joonas Utti founded their company Gigglebug Entertainment in 2013 and started brainstorming the title character of the series already during the first year of the company's inception.

The following year, they told about their idea to a Disney employee they met in France. They liked the idea and asked to be contacted when it had been refined.

In 2015, Gigglebug Entertainment, Disney EMEA and Zodiak Kids Studios started developing the series together. Later Gigglebug Entertainment collaborated with Disney on the development of 101 Dalmatian Street in 2016, with the show airing in 2019.

The production of true series began in summer 2020 with Utti as chief director and Harlin as executive producer together with Zodiak Kids Studios' CEO Benoit di Sabatino. Lucy Pryke of Gigglebug Entertainment and Gary Milne of Zodiak Kids were appointed as creative producers. Zodiak Kids took international distribution rights for the series. The show was officially announced in October 2020. This was the first time Disney had commissioned an original programme from Finland. The series was produced over the course of two years in Finland, Canada, France and the UK.

The main character in the series has been inspired by Utti's childhood friend Kike. Kike was Costa Rican exchange student who lived at Utti's home in Lappeenranta and who made a big impression on 14-year-old Utti, who considers himself an introvert. Kike broke the Finnish behavioural taboos and taught Utti to see the world from a new perspective. During the brainstorming phase, Gustav was made into a felt-doll and Utti and Harlin joked about yellow snow.

The show initially premiered on Disney Channel in Portugal and in Spain on 9 May 2022, before premiering in France on 14 May of the same year.

The first season consists of 50 11-minute episodes. Each episode is aired in pairs to fit the half-hour timeslots when aired on Disney Channel. The first 20 11-minute episodes were released on Yle Areena on 1 July 2022, with the entire season later being released on Disney+. It is also the first Finnish show for Disney, though the creators had developed 101 Dalmatian Street for a 2019 release.

In the United Kingdom, ZeeToons released clips of the show on YouTube, with two full episodes, "Long Time No Ski" and "Katz", being released on 9 August 2022, and 16 August 2022, respectively. On 5 December 2022, ZeeToons announced that the series would be released on Disney+.

== Episodes ==
No.	Title	Directed by	Written by	Storyboarded by	Original release date	Finnish release date	Prod. code
1	"Winterton is Coming"	Joonas Utti	Reid Harrison (Note: In the Finnish dub, David Stern is credited as the writer.)	Romain Beuriot	14 May 2022	1 July 2022	TBA
1	"The First Supper"	Joonas Utti	David Stern (Note: In the Finnish dub, Reid Harrison is credited as the writer.)	Seán Hogan	14 May 2022	1 July 2022	TBA
Leaving from a summery island, Osmo and his dad Nick are going to a town called Winterton to meet his cousin Rita. As they arrive, Mayor Chrome tours them while thinking that monsters are unreal. However, Osmo notices that his surf board is missing and tries finding it. He only finds half of the board with some big foot steps. Following them, he finds an area with someone in it and gives him the other half. Coming out of the area is a giant yellow yeti named Gustav, which Osmo gets freaked out by at first, but noticed it speaking. Gustav confirms that there are other monsters in the town but he is unallowed per the rules. Rita takes a peak noticing that monsters exist, so she gets an old man to sound the alarm, scaring Gustav, though Mayor maintains monsters are unreal. The people of town start singing which scares Gustav more, so Osmo makes earmuffs for him. Thanks to Osmo yelling at Gustav, an avalanche starts to fall down. As Osmo rides on Gustav, Rita notices that she will get run over by them. Continuing the plot from the previous episode, Gustav flips positions and Rita starts riding on him. Landing to Rita's house, her parents arrive and tells them about a monster inside. Osmo and Gustav get worried, since Rita's parents think about killing the monster if they found one. Osmo and Rita want save Gustav so that he is not in danger. Rita tries distracting her mother while Osmo sneaks Gustav to get out of the house, which turned out successful with Gustav in a bag of clothes. With dinner ready, everyone hated the meatballs. Gustav comes in disguised as a chef named "Chef Yummy Sasason", with the meal being "comfort food", food that comes out of Gustav's feet as seen earlier in the episode. Everyone liked the food except for Osmo and Rita, and Mayor welcomes Osmo and Nick to the town. As Gustav originally wanted to go back to the mountain, Osmo wanted him to stay with him as he thinks he belongs here.
2	"Long Time No Ski"	Joonas Utti	David Lewman	Seán Hogan	14 May 2022	1 July 2022	TBA
2	"Yeti as Yeti"	Joonas Utti	Gene Laufenberg	Olivier Poirette & Leena Lecklin	14 May 2022	1 July 2022	TBA
Everyone in Winterton has a ski armlet except for Osmo, as per the rules of the town that everyone should have ski armlets, Osmo has to earn one or else he is banished. Gustav starts to teach Osmo on how to ski, though his skiing is different from human skiing. Gustav gets Rita to teach Osmo on how to ski, though it all does not work out as he keeps bumping into trees. As Mayor reports to Osmo about his exam, smashing into a tree counts as an aromatic failure. Now he has to pass by challenge, with the race course being one of the tallest mountains. Gustav distracts Mayor by eating an ice cream cone with sprinkles which violates the rules, and gets Osmo to finally pass the Mayor. With the Mayor winning, he violates one of the rules by swallowing the ice cream and pushes Osmo. Osmo wins the race and gets his armlet. Watching a horror movie titled The Yoel of the Yeti, Gustav gets offended because he has never seen any yeti act like they would always just scare, which is why the Yeti species gets a bad reputation because of the stereotypes of them being monsters. Everyone got scared because they watched the movie. Later in the morning, Mayor once again clarifies that monsters do not exist. Mayor decides to do a practice drill if a monster came to town. Gustav comes in disguised as "Frank McDanielson" to play the "most realistic" portrayal of a yeti. In the yeti suit, he plays around giving people hugs, make snow angels, build snowman, riding a baby and juggling. Gustav announces that yetis are not monsters as many would think. The baby grabs Mayor's legs, and the baby cries because of Mayor being mean to him. This triggers Gustav, as he would save the baby from more harm. Almost everyone however starts to freak out. Gustav pushes a tree which Mayor runs into, as he is uncertain about his surroundings, he is on a plate of ice in the river, which would flow into bears, a saw mill and a water fall. Gustav rips his costume off and saves Mayor. Mayor did not see Gustav to prove that yetis are sometimes heroic however, though the baby is unscared of him. The Mayor announced a competition with a trophy, with himself being the winner, though Gustav would secretly steal it from him while announcing a celebration.
3	"Stink-erton"	Joonas Utti	Nicole Paglia	Jean-Michel Boesch	15 May 2022	1 July 2022	TBA
3	"Full Monster"	Joonas Utti	Jeff D'Elia	Romain Beuriot	15 May 2022	1 July 2022	TBA
Going to Winterton peak, the gang, alongside Nick and Rita's parents are on a camping trip. Osmo learns about the founders of the town, Sir Wallace Wint and Emma Ertton. Rita goes to the mountain to find where Ertton camps at. Anders starts following the trio to see what they are finding. They did lose the map, but Gustav senses a smell of the fish fins and finds it, which gives Rita excitement, and found where Ertton was camping. Gustav wants to badly but Rita wants it intact for historical purposes. The gang found a snow fort with Anders and his friends. They steal the fish fins and the gang tries getting it back, only for them to lose it. Only happens however that Anders has the fish fins already. He opens the can and smells the stink, which would later get into the camp of the parents of Osmo and Rita. After losing a game of Combocky, the gang goes to a pity party which in itself is a spa. After Rita scared them in a mud monster disguise, Osmo and Gustav bump into ice and notice red steam. The gang got away from the while Gustav holds his breath, as breathing in the steam can turn him "full monster", and thinks that humans would avoid the syndrome if they breathe in the steam. Gustav is tied in rope upside down so he could not escape and pass out. Osmo and Rita both find possible weaknesses for the syndrome. Later in the morning, it turns out that Gustav is actually fine and does not have the syndrome. Rita starts acting funny however, going in rage for a bit. Checking on her, she noticeably has red eyes and howls like a wolf, having the "full monster" syndrome. Gustav gets excited but Rita is not doing this purposely. Gustav questions if humans are half monster, so Osmo tries finding a cure, only for him to get the syndrome as well. Gustav is freaked out thinking that he is going to be eaten, so he looks into a book about the syndrome and finds out the cure is skunk cabbages. Chasing them to give the cure, he shoots the cabbages with the hockey stick thrown directly to their mouths. Osmo and Rita are now back to normal.
4	"Rug Burn"	Joonas Utti	Gene Laufenberg	Leena Lecklin	15 May 2022	1 July 2022	TBA
4	"Katz"	Joonas Utti	Anastasia Heinzl	Marion Benkaid-Kesba	15 May 2022	1 July 2022	TBA
As Mayor got himself a new rug, Gustav thinks that the rug was the skin of his grandpa, and cries about it. Osmo, Rita and Gustav decide to take the rug to the monster mountain graveyard with a traditional yeti funeral. However, after an owl steals the rug, Gustav catches it while falling on branches, them resulting in the rug to rip. A little of the rug still remains however. While barring the remains, turns out however that that Gustav's grandpa is still alive and comes to graveyard to spend time with his dead friends. It also turns out that the rug was actually manufactured. Gustav's grandpa now uses the rug remains as a wig. Osmo wants to see if his inflatable donut has returned to him, but sees nothing in the mailbox, waiting for a whole month after leaving it behind. The gang tries to find out what happened to Winterton's Mail Cats. Gustav finds a hat of Mr. Pufflelum, getting Osmo and Rita excitement. The gang finds the packages including the donut, along with the cats, who all have gone feral. The cats trap the gang inside a litter box, so they summon the Northern Lights for help. The lights take the donut and eats it, then uses laser beams to distract the cats so the gang could get out. Gustav breaks the cage with his cat allergies and gets the packages, with everyone finally getting their deliveries.
5	"Lady of the Lake"	Joonas Utti	Kristina Yee	Olivier Poirette & Leena Lecklin	21 May 2022	1 July 2022	TBA
5	"Pinesap Flood Day"	Joonas Utti	Kate Boutilier	Boris Brenot	21 May 2022	1 July 2022	TBA
While fishing after Gustav breaks the ice on the lake, Osmo catches a sea monster named Octavia, which jumpscares Osmo and Rita. The roaring however was monster for "hello". When Octavia is outside for too long, she drys so she gets back in the water and gives the gang lots of fish. Octavia later pops out of the sink, so the gang distracts Rita's mother. The gang and Octavia would later go outside for fun. Gustav sprays Octavia whenever she gets dry. Later the gang is back inside, where Octavia would eat the humans. Gustav warns the kids about it per sign language. Gustav pretends to cook the kids as "children chilly". As Octavia gets dried-up, Gustav reveals that this is actually a trap by him and Octavia escapes in the sink with Gustav blowing her. In a school, Gustav is disguised as a kid named "Rod Rego". The class watches a video where in 1917, monsters kicked barrels of pinesap, resulting in a flood of pinesap. The town sticks themselves together to save themselves, which works they the flood resulted in a new holiday. After the video was over, the gang goes to festival that celebrates the day. The people of the town would sing a song which scares Gustav, though Osmo does interrupt the singing. The gang would do some activities with Osmo trying to show himself as a true member of the town. Anders announces that he created a pretend flood with Mayor. Osmo and Gustav however, created a stack of 99 Pinesap barrels to create a giant real flood to an anthemic recreation of the original flood. The barrels start breaking which creates the flood. Osmo warns everyone about a real flood coming in, with the people running from the flood. This plan works and Rita congratulates Osmo for saving the town.
6	"Royal Flush"	Joonas Utti	David Lewman	Romain Beuriot	22 May 2022	1 July 2022	112
6	"Two Osmos Too Many"	Joonas Utti	Gene Laufenberg	Marion Benkaid-Kesba	22 May 2022	1 July 2022	114
Gustav flushes a legendary toilet, which causes everyone in town to want to sit on it. A living puddle starts to imitate Osmo.
7	"Sweaty Yeti"	Joonas Utti	David Lewman	Olivier Poirette & Leena Lecklin	28 May 2022	1 July 2022	TBA
7	"Pipey"	Joonas Utti	Neal Boushell	Seán Hogan	28 May 2022	1 July 2022	TBA
Rita must win against Anders in a sauna dance battle. Osmo finds a cute monster that he finds inoffensive, but later starts chewing on everything metal in town.
8	"Spring Fever"	Joonas Utti	Reid Harrison	Boris Brenot	29 May 2022	1 July 2022	TBA
8	"Momster"	Joonas Utti	Rebecca Hobbs	Romain Beuriot	29 May 2022	1 July 2022	TBA
After a glacier that was supposed to break apart at the beginning of spring stays intact, everyone suddely falls in love with each other, much to Gustav's disgust. He starts to do some tasks for the Northern Lights in order to make the glacier break. After stealing a mysterious stone from her mother, Rita starts noticing her acting strange, with her most notable trait being red eyes, which makes her start believing that she is a monster. In truth, the stone was actually an old friend of hers and the red eyes were to scare Rita.
9	"Gondola with the Wind"	Joonas Utti	Neal Boushell	Seán Hogan	4 June 2022	1 July 2022	TBA
9	"Let the Games Begin"	Joonas Utti	David Stern	Marion Benkaid-Kesba	4 June 2022	1 July 2022	TBA
10	"Yeti Bear"	Joonas Utti	David Lewman	Boris Brenot	5 June 2022	1 July 2022	TBA
10	"Interneti Yeti"	Joonas Utti	David Stern	Meredith Calzoni	5 June 2022	1 July 2022	TBA
11	"Pine-Saps"	Joonas Utti	Gene Laufenberg	Romain Beuriot	11 June 2022	4 November 2022	TBA
11	"Art-Ache"	Joonas Utti	Bec Hill	Leena Lecklin	11 June 2022	4 November 2022	TBA
12	"Chromocracy"	Joonas Utti	Reid Harrison	Seán Hogan	12 June 2022	4 November 2022	TBA
12	"Save the Date"	Joonas Utti	Jeff D'Elia	Meredith Calzoni	12 June 2022	4 November 2022	TBA
13	"Beetleggers"	Joonas Utti	Baljeet Rai	Oliver Ducrest	19 November 2022	4 November 2022	TBA
13	"Gustavella"	Joonas Utti	Davey Moore	Boris Brenot	19 November 2022	4 November 2022	TBA
14	"Yeti Delivery"	Joonas Utti	David Lewman	Seán Hogan	19 November 2022	4 November 2022	TBA
14	"Arm-A-Geddin"	Joonas Utti	Rebecca Hobbs	Romain Beuriot	19 November 2022	4 November 2022	TBA
15	"Rainbow Snow"	Joonas Utti	Reid Harrison	Boris Brenot	20 November 2022	4 November 2022	TBA
15	"Smitten Kitten"	Joonas Utti	Rebecca Hobbs	Meredith Calzoni	20 November 2022	4 November 2022	TBA
16	"Monster Momma's Boy"	Joonas Utti	Jeff D'Elia	Romain Beuriot	20 November 2022	4 November 2022	TBA
16	"Pops'icle"	Joonas Utti	Henry Gifford	Leena Lecklin	20 November 2022	4 November 2022	TBA
17	"Timey Wimey Yellow Yeti"	Joonas Utti	Baljeet Rai	Boris Brenot	26 November 2022	4 November 2022	TBA
17	"Monster Swap"	Joonas Utti	David Lewman	Seán Hogan	26 November 2022	4 November 2022	TBA
18	"Monster Mash-Up"	Joonas Utti	Ashley Mendoza	Meredith Calzoni	26 November 2022	4 November 2022	TBA
18	"A Necessary Weasel"	Luke Allen	Henry Gifford	Leena Lecklin	26 November 2022	4 November 2022	TBA
19	"Fortune Hunters"	Luke Allen	Nicole Paglia	Seán Hogan	27 November 2022	4 November 2022	TBA
19	"Tree-Ta"	Luke Allen	Kyle Hart	Romain Beuriot	27 November 2022	4 November 2022	TBA
20	"The Thingy"	Luke Allen	Jeff D'Elia	Meredith Calzoni	3 December 2022	4 November 2022	TBA
20	"Something Rotten"	Luke Allen & Jean-Michel Boesch	Henry Gifford	Boris Brenot	3 December 2022	4 November 2022	TBA
21	"Secrets, Lies, and Monster Ties"	Joonas Utti	Ashley Mendoza	Leena Lecklin	4 December 2022	4 November 2022	TBA
21	"The Way of the Ukko"	Luke Allen	Tshepo Moche & Jeff D'Elia	Seán Hogan	4 December 2022	6 January 2023	TBA
22	"Wolverina"	Jasmi Ritola & Luke Allen	David Lewman	Mathias Dumas	10 December 2022	6 January 2023	TBA
22	"Forget Me Yeti"	Luke Allen & Jean-Michel Boesch	Baljeet Rai	Romain Beuriot	10 December 2022	6 January 2023	TBA
23	"Wild Things"	Jean-Michel Boesch	Beata Harju	Seán Hogan	11 December 2022	6 January 2023	TBA
23	"Gotta Get Goosey"	Joonas Utti	David Lewman	Boris Brenot	11 December 2022	6 January 2023	TBA
24	"Worst Wintertonian Ever"	Bianca Ansems	Jeff D'Elia	Juan Pedro Alcaide	17 December 2022	6 January 2023	TBA
24	"Hoop Happy"	Jean-Michel Boesch	David Lewman	Romain Beuriot	17 December 2022	6 January 2023	TBA
25	"Musical Monster Mania"	Joonas Utti	Baljeet Rai	Leena Lecklin	18 December 2022	6 January 2023	TBA
25	"Musical Monster Mania"	Joonas Utti	Ashley Mendoza	Boris Brenot	18 December 2022	6 January 2023	TBA

=== Shorts ===
The first six shorts have been released on Yle Areena on 1 July 2022 with the last five released on 4 November 2022, and all of them have been written by Giles Pilbrow, storyboarded by Marion Benkaid-Kesba and directed by Samppa Kukkonen.

No.	Title	Original release date
1	TBA	4 July 2022
2	TBA	5 July 2022
3	TBA	6 July 2022
4	TBA	7 July 2022
5	TBA	8 July 2022
6	TBA	9 July 2022
7	TBA	10 July 2022
8	"Rule #33: All Wintertonians Must Try Urghickl!"	11 July 2022
9	"Rule #64A: Winterton Snow Shovel Rule"	12 July 2022
10	"Rule #243: Snowball Duel"	13 July 2022
While building snowmen, Rita and Osmo both get hit by snowballs with them suspecting that one of them started it. Two more snowballs were thrown and they now suspect Gustav as the thrower. Both started throwing snowballs at him and loses his sandwich. The trio is now dueling with each other, and started the fight when Gustav roared. They are started getting tired however, but it actually an anthropomorphic tree that was making the trio have the argument.
11	"Rule #17 1/2: No Picnics Allowed During Weasel Season!"	14 July 2022 (Note: This short was released on the ZeeToons YouTube channel in the United Kingdom on 12 July 2022.)
The gang is having their picnic when all of a sudden, a weasel shows up stealing their food. They must catch it before it eats all of their food. The weasel would later get stuck in a tree with Gustav catching it, but unfortunately, more weasels appear eating their food.
