= Abdullah Afzal =

English actor and stand-up comedian

- عبداللہ افضل
- Born: 8 February 1989 (age 37); Cheetham Hill, Manchester, England
- Notable work: Citizen Khan

Comedy career
- Years active: 2006–present
- Medium: Television, film, radio, stand-up
- Genre: Observational humour
- Subject: Islamic humour

Abdullah Afzal (Punjabi: عبداللہ افضل; born 8 February 1989) is a British actor and stand-up comedian.

== Early life ==
Afzal was born on 8 February 1989 to Pakistani parents in Cheetham Hill, Manchester, England. His family originates from Rawalpindi in Pakistan. He has three older brothers, two older sisters and a younger half-brother. His native language spoken at home was Pothwari. He attended Abraham Moss High School in North Manchester.

Afzal trained for three years to be a hafiz.

== Career ==
In 2007, Afzal had his first acting role as a young student in a short film called Raamis (originally called Extraordinary Rendition). Between 2008 and 2011, he starred as Asif in two seasons of BBC Three sitcom Lunch Monkeys. Since 2012, he has portrayed the character of Amjad Malik in BBC One's Citizen Khan.

In February 2014, Afzal presented the Christmas comedy specials on BBC Asian Network. In July 2015, he performed stand-up at the Eid Special Comedy Night at The Comedy Store in London.

In July 2014, Afzal played two roles in BBC Radio 4's By a Young Officer: Churchill on the North West Frontier.

In 2017, he appeared as Jahid in the romantic comedy film Finding Fatimah.

In 2021, Afzal wrote, starred, and directed Cinder’aliyah, Britain’s first Muslim pantomime. The pantomime is due to tour again in 2022.

== Personal life ==
He works at Manchester Airport and Eden Boys' Leadership academy Manchester to supplement his acting career , and lives in Manchester with his wife Uzma, who he married in 2015.

== Filmography ==
=== Film ===
Year	Title	Role	Notes
2010	Raamis	Raamis	Short film
2017	Finding Fatimah	Jahid	Feature film

=== Television ===
Year	Title	Role	Notes
2008–2011	Lunch Monkeys	Asif Khan	13 episodes
2012–2016	Citizen Khan	Amjad Malik	27 episodes
2017	Celebrity MasterChef	Himself	eliminated

=== Radio ===
Year	Title	Role	Station
2012	By a Young Officer: Churchill on the North West Frontier	Railway Clerk / Sikh Soldier	BBC Radio 4

== See also ==
- Islamic humour
- British Pakistani
- List of British Pakistanis
