= Reid Harrison =

Television producer and writer (1958–2024)

- Born: Reid Williams Harrison; November 6, 1958; Fredericksburg, Virginia, U.S.
- Died: January 15, 2024 (aged 65)
- Occupations: Screenwriter; producer; musician; comedian
- Years active: 1979–2024
- Musical career
- Genre: Rock and roll
- Instruments: Bass; guitar; vocals
- Formerly of: The Dimeslots

Reid Williams Harrison (November 6, 1958 – January 15, 2024) was an American screenwriter and television producer.

== Biography ==
Harrison graduated from the College of William & Mary in 1982. He wrote a spec script for The Simpsons, which got him hired on showrunners Al Jean and Mike Reiss's animated sitcom The Critic. The series was canceled by Fox before his episode aired, but Jean and Reiss got him work on The Simpsons. He was story editor for the show and wrote the season eight episode "The Springfield Files" and the season nineteen episode "Papa Don't Leech". He was supervising producer on the Netflix show, Disenchantment.

In the decade between his two Simpsons credits, and afterward, Harrison wrote for television shows such as The PJs, George and Leo, Men Behaving Badly, Brother's Keeper, Gary & Mike, George of the Jungle, Pinky and the Brain, Duckman, Drawn Together, The Mullets, 3-South, Angelo Rules, Sonic Boom, Danger Mouse, The Unstoppable Yellow Yeti and Boy Girl Dog Cat Mouse Cheese.

Bob Odenkirk credits Harrison with encouraging him to pursue the opportunity to play Saul Goodman on Breaking Bad. Odenkirk said he asked Harrison about the show Breaking Bad when he was sent a script and said Harrison told him, "You better do that show. That's the greatest show on TV."

Harrison died on January 15, 2024, at the age of 65.
