= The Business of Murder =

- Original language: English
- Written by: Richard Harris
- Genre: psychological thriller

Premiere
- Date: February 1981
- Place: Theatre Royal, Windsor

The Business of Murder is a British play that ran for eight years in the West End.

It starred Richard Todd who called it "beautifully written and devised... the leading role was a gem."

== Plot ==
Stone, a humourless and dour man, invites Dee, a television playwright, over to his flat on the premise of discussing a script. Once there, she is surprised when Superintendent Hallett, the man with whom she is having an affair, also arrives for an entirely different reason.

But nothing is as it seems and as the plot twists and turns, the motive of their host Stone gradually becomes clear. They are all, it would seem, in the same business... The Business of Murder.
