= Sherlock Yack =

- Genre: Mystery
- Based on: Series by: Michel Amelin; Colonel Mustard
- Directed by: Jérôme Mouscadet
- Composer: Score Factory
- Countries of origin: France; Germany
- Original languages: English; French
- No. of seasons: 1
- No. of episodes: 52

Production
- Producer: Eve Baron-Charlton
- Running time: 13 minutes
- Production companies: Mondo TV France; ZDF Enterprises

Original release
- Network: TF1 (France); ZDF and KiKA (Germany)
- Release: 4 May 2011 – 4 March 2012

Sherlock Yack (also known as Sherlock Yack: Zoo-Détective) is an animated television series in 52 episodes of 13 minutes, co-produced by Mondo TV France and ZDF Enterprises, with the participation of TF1 and ZDF, and adapted from the novels of Michel Amelin, illustrated by Ruth Christelle (a.k.a. Colonel Mustard). The airing of the series began on 4 May 2011 on TF1 as part of their TFOU block, and since 22 December 2012.

== Plot ==
Sherlock Yack is a detective of the zoo. As soon as a crime is committed, he investigates with his young assistant, Hermione. With her help, he finds suspects and clues, while also getting into wacky adventures along the way.

== Characters ==
=== Main characters ===
- Sherlock Yack: Sherlock is the zoo detective who solves cases. Unlike Sherlock Holmes, he is a yak, and is terrible in playing bagpipes. He was once a student in a Shaolin-like Buddhist monastery led by an ancient vulture called the Ball of Purity, and took time to pass his test.
- Hermione: A young female stoat and Sherlock's apprentice. She helps him to find clues, suspects, and proofs. She doesn't like bagpipes, especially when Sherlock plays them, and she sometimes replaces Sherlock like answering the call and finding the culprit. According to Sherlock, she is the daughter of a friend of his.

== Novels ==
1. Qui a explosé le flamant rose ? (2006)
2. Qui a étranglé le tigre ? (2006)
3. Qui a piégé le pingouin ? (2006)
4. Qui a saucissonné l'éléphant blanc ? (2007)
5. Qui a noué le python ? (2007)
6. Qui a zigouillé le koala ? (2007)
7. Qui a liquidé le raton laveur ? (2007)

== Episodes ==
#	Title	Suspects
1.	Who Broke the Kangaroo's Hand?	Old Horse, Gorilla (Culprit) and Chihuahua
2.	Who Knocked Out the Howling Monkey?	Koala (Culprit), Boa and Beaver
3.	Who Robbed the Seal?	Pelican (Culprit), Turtle and Piranha (Culprit)
4.	Who Tagged the Bird of Paradise?	Marabou, Hyena and Chameleon (Culprit)
5.	Who Painted the Ostrich?	Crane, Stork (Culprit) and Mrs. Hippo
6.	Who Plugged Up the Elephant's Trunk?	Skunk, Gorilla and Sloths (Culprits)
7.	Who Poisoned the Cheetah?	Lion, Tiger and Gazelle (Culprit)
8.	Who Crushed the Panda?	Speedy Raccoon, Mr. Hippo and Mrs. Panda (Unsuspected Culprit)
9.	Who Bugged the Porcupine?	Flamingo (Culprit), Coyote and Dromedary
10.	Who Wants to Fry the Piranha?	Seal, Pelican (Culprit) and Skunk
11.	Who Made the Parrot Sneeze?	Mrs. Hippo, Myna (Culprit) and Bobcat
12.	Who Vandalized the Vampire Bat?	Mr. Hippo, Giraffe (Culprit) and Beaver
13.	Who Broke the Crane's Voice?	Pelican, Rockhopper and Lemur (Culprit)
14.	Who Blinded the Giraffe?	Ostrich, Grizzly and Lion (Culprit)
15.	Who Cleaned Up the Warthog?	Marabou, Grizzly (Culprit) and Skunk
16.	Who Glued Up the Orangutan?	Lemur, Kangaroo (Culprit) and Chameleon (Culprit)
17.	Who Mugged the Boa?	Howler Monkey (Culprit), Koala and Crane
18.	Who Harassed the Yak?	Beaver (Culprit), Parrot and Tiger
19.	Who Sabotaged Mrs. Fennec's Machine?	Gazelle, Okapi, Flamingo and Mrs. Fennec (Unsuspected Culprit)
20.	Who Robbed the Baboon?	Turtle (Culprit), Gorilla and Bobcat
21.	Who Knocked Out Sherlock?	Zebu, Okapi and Guinea Pigs (Culprit)
22.	Who Robbed the Tapir?	Crocodile (Culprit), Kangaroo, Pelican and Speedy Raccoon
23	Who Dented the Turtle?	Speedy Raccoon, Cheetah (Culprit) and Sloths
24.	Who Unstriped the Zebra?	Tiger, Okapi (Culprit) and Garter Snake
25.	Who Chocked Up the Grizzly with Laughter?	Parrot, Gorilla and Baboon (Culprit)
26.	Who Mugged the Heron?	Stork, Mrs. Guinea Pig (Culprit) and Old Horse
27.	Who Knotted Up the Octopus?	Elephant, Vampire Bat and Ostrich (Culprit)
28.	Who Blackmailed the Myna?	Skunk, Rockhopper (Culprit) and Orangutan
29.	Who Trimmed the Peacock?	Crane (Culprit), Skunk and Mrs. Hippo
30.	Who Soaped Up Mrs. Hippo?	Bobcat, Warthog and Hyena (Culprit)
31.	Who Ridiculed the Lion?	Tiger (Culprit), Cheetah and Bobcat
32.	Who Graffitied Hermione?	Bird of Paradise, Baboon (Culprit) and Tiger
33.	Who Stuck the Gorilla in the Sand?	Kangaroo, Crocodile and Porcupine (Culprit)
34.	Who Robbed the Crane?	Turtle, Mrs. Penguin (Culprit) and Octopus
35.	Who Made the Crocodile Cry?	Kangaroo, Mr. Hippo and Porcupine (Culprit)
36.	Who Trunked the Elephant?	Baboon, Bobcat (Culprit) and Rockhopper
37.	Who Painted the Skunk?	Mrs. Fennec, Lemur and Hermione (Unsuspected Culprit)
38.	Who Tied Up the Beaver?	Seal (Culprit), Crocodile and Chef Panda
39.	Who Derailed the Guinea Pigs?	Old Horse (Culprit), Turtle and Bobcat
40.	Who Cooled Off the Piranha?	Stork, Gazelle and Mrs. Hippo (Culprit)
41.	Who Froze Up Mrs. Penguin?	Marabou (Culprit), Warthog and Bird of Paradise
42.	Who Smeared the Zebu?	Skunk, Boa and Porcupine (Culprit)
43.	Who Fooled the Hippopotamus?	Old Horse, Orangutan (Culprit) and Parrot
44.	Who Made Stork Fart?	Grizzly (Culprit), Pelican and Warthog
45.	Who Targeted the Tiger?	Zebu (Culprit), Guinea Pigs, Seal
46.	Who Busted the Bagpipes?	Boa (Culprit), Hermione and Mr. Hippo
47.	Who Cut Up the Rockhopper's Collection?	Gorilla, Chihuahua and Garter Snake (Culprit)
48.	Who Sunk the Pelican?	Howler Monkey (Culprit), Mrs. Panda and Rockhopper
49.	Who Cemented the Turtle?	Mrs. Sloth, Mrs. Panda and Peacock (Culprit)
50.	Who Knocked Out Gorilla?	Bird of Paradise, Lion and Baboon (Unsuspected Culprit)
51.	Who Kidnapped Hermione?	Okapi, Kangaroo and Gorilla
52.	Who Psychedelicized Chameleon?	Bird of Paradise (Culprit), Myna (Culprit) and Chihuahua (Culprit)
