= Gerard Johnson (director) =

British writer-director

- Occupations: Writer-director, screenwriter
- Years active: 2004-present
- Notable work: Tony, Hyena, Muscle, Odyssey

Gerard Johnson is a British writer-director and screenwriter. His feature films include Tony (2009), Hyena (2014), Muscle (2019) and Odyssey (2025).

== Career ==
Johnson directed the short films Mug (2004) and Tony (2005), the latter of which was later developed into his feature debut.

His first feature film, Tony, was written and directed by Johnson and starred Peter Ferdinando. The film was also released as Tony: London Serial Killer.

Johnson's second feature, Hyena, is a crime thriller written and directed by Johnson and produced by Elizabeth Karlsen, Joanna Laurie and Stephen Woolley. The film had its world premiere at the 2014 Edinburgh International Film Festival and screened at the 2014 Toronto International Film Festival. Tribeca Film acquired North American rights following the Toronto screening. Hyena won Best Feature Film in the Fantàstic Òrbita section at the 2014 Sitges Film Festival.

Johnson wrote and directed Muscle, a 2019 psychological thriller starring Cavan Clerkin and Craig Fairbrass. The film had its world premiere in the Thrill strand at the 2019 BFI London Film Festival. It was nominated for the Raindance Discovery Award at the 2019 British Independent Film Awards.

His fourth feature, Odyssey, was co-written by Johnson and Austin Collings and starred Polly Maberly, Mikael Persbrandt and Guy Burnet. The film had its world premiere at the 2025 SXSW Film & TV Festival and was selected for the 2025 Edinburgh International Film Festival.

In 2018, Variety reported that Johnson was attached to direct the true-crime thriller Three Rivers for producers Robbie Brenner and Michael Keyes.

== Style and collaborations ==
Johnson's films are often London-set crime or psychological thrillers centred on isolated or compromised characters. BFI Player's Gerard Johnson collection describes his work as following fallible people in extreme situations and exploring darker parts of inner-city life.

Johnson has repeatedly collaborated with actor Peter Ferdinando, editor Ian Davies and composer Matt Johnson of The The. The British Council credits Ian Davies as editor on Hyena, Muscle and Odyssey, and credits Matt Johnson or The The as composer on Hyena and Odyssey. Matt Johnson also scored Tony, Hyena and Muscle.

== Filmography ==
Year	Title	Credited as	Notes
2004	Mug	Director	Short film
2005	Tony	Director	Short film; later developed into the 2009 feature
2009	Tony	Writer, director	Feature film
2014	Hyena	Writer, director	Feature film; winner of Best Feature Film in the Fantàstic Òrbita section at Sitges
2019	Muscle	Writer, director	Feature film; BIFA Raindance Discovery Award nominee
2025	Odyssey	Co-writer, director, executive producer	Feature film; SXSW 2025 official selection
TBA	Three Rivers	Director	Announced project
