= Muscle (film) =

2019 film by Gerard Johnson

- Directed by: Gerard Johnson
- Written by: Gerard Johnson
- Produced by: Ed Barratt; Frédéric Fiore
- Starring: Craig Fairbrass; Cavan Clerkin; Peter Ferdinando
- Cinematography: Stuart Bentley
- Edited by: Ian Davies
- Music by: Matt Johnson
- Production company: Stigma Films
- Release date: 11 October 2019
- Running time: 110 mins
- Country: United Kingdom
- Language: English

Muscle is a 2019 British thriller written and directed by Gerard Johnson. The film stars Craig Fairbrass as Terry, a hands-on personal trainer that gradually takes over the life of Simon (Cavan Clerkin), a jaded office worker. The film was released in the United Kingdom on 4 December, 2020.

== Plot summary ==
Simon (Clerkin) is an unhappy office worker who has relocated from London to Newcastle. His home life with his emotionally withdrawn wife, Sarah (Maberly) is crushingly monotonous. He becomes drawn into a gym that he passes on his work commute, and quickly comes under the influence of Terry (Fairbrass), a hands-on personal trainer with a military background who offers to mentor Simon, introducing him to bodybuilding and growing his self-esteem. Overbearing Terry uses his influence over Simon to emotionally manipulate him as Simon's life takes a dangerous turn.

== Cast ==
- Craig Fairbrass as Terry
- Cavan Clerkin as Simon
- Sinead Matthews as Sandra
- Polly Maberly as Sarah
- Lorraine Burroughs as Crystal
- Peter Ferdinando as Ken
- Mark Stobbart as Ronnie

== Reception ==
The film was well-received critically and it holds a 100% rating on Rotten Tomatoes. Empire gave it a four-star review: "Muscle takes the trappings of a macho crime flick and informs them with sensitivity and smarts, perfectly played by Cavan Clerkin and Craig Fairbrass. It packs all the punch and power of a whey protein shake." The Guardian gave the film a three-star review, praising the casting in this "laudably gruelling descent into a macho underworld of dumbbells and sexual debauchery." Sight and Sound described the film as "a striking and atmospheric piece of work that crackles with tension" and that "Johnson has a keen eye and ear for performative machismo and the rituals of male-dominated spaces."
