= Hyena (film) =

2014 British crime thriller film

- United Kingdom theatrical release poster
- Directed by: Gerard Johnson
- Written by: Gerard Johnson
- Produced by: Stephen Woolley; Joanna Laurie; Elizabeth Karlsen
- Starring: Peter Ferdinando; Stephen Graham; MyAnna Buring; Elisa Lasowski; Neil Maskell; Richard Dormer; Tony Pitts; Mehmet Ferda; Orli Shuka; Matt Creighton
- Cinematography: Benjamin Kračun
- Edited by: Ian Davies
- Music by: The The
- Production companies: Number 9 Films, Film4 Productions
- Release dates: 18 June 2014 (Edinburgh International Film Festival); 6 March 2015
- Running time: 112 minutes
- Country: United Kingdom
- Language: English

Hyena is a 2014 British neo-noir crime thriller film written and directed by Gerard Johnson.

== Plot ==
Michael Logan is a detective sergeant in London, working as part of a specialised taskforce alongside his friends and colleagues Chris, Martin and Keith. The taskforce's unconventional and corrupt operations bring the officers into contact with European drug syndicates, with them happy to turn a blind eye to their dealings for either a cut, or electing to confiscate suppliers' merchandise for their own profit. Logan meets with a contact in a Turkish-Kurdish drug cartel, who is organising a large scale shipment that he has invested £100,000 into with the hope of netting an even better profit. However, during the meeting his contact is ambushed and attacked by members of a rival Albanian gang, run by the Kabashi brothers, looking to expand their power. Logan meets with and aims to provide the Albanians with the same service he provided the Turks, but they aren't easily led.

Meanwhile, he and his colleagues are being investigated by the Professional Standards Department, headed up by Detective Inspector Nick Taylor. Complicating matters further, Logan is seconded from the Taskforce to a new operation run by the vice unit, aiming at investigating the Kabashis' involvement in people trafficking. It is headed up by DI David Knight, a former friend and colleague of Logan's who he fell out with a decade prior.

== Cast ==
- Peter Ferdinando as DS Michael Logan, West London Police Taskforce
- Tony Pitts as Keith, West London Police Taskforce
- Neil Maskell as Martin, West London Police Taskforce
- Thomas Craig as DCI Harrison, Head of West London Police Taskforce
- Stephen Graham as DI David Knight, West London Police CSO14
- Richard Dormer as DI Nick Taylor, West London Police Professional Standards
- Lorenzo Camporese as DS John Noonan, West London Police Professional Standards
- MyAnna Buring as Lisa, a close friend of Michael
- Orli Shuka as Nikolla Kabashi, an Albanian gangster
- Gjevat Kelmendi as Rezar Kabashi, an Albanian gangster
- Elisa Lasowski as Ariana, an Albanian woman trafficked by the Kabashi's
- Mehmet Ferda as Akif Dikman, a Turkish-Kurdish criminal (based on Hüseyin Baybaşin)

== Release ==
Hyena was the opening film at the 2014 Edinburgh Film Festival and later in 2014 was shown at the Toronto International Film Festival.

Tribeca acquired North American rights to the film. It ran on 24 April 2015 as part of the Tribeca Film Festival.

== Reception ==
On review aggregator Rotten Tomatoes, the film holds an approval rating of 78% based on 45 reviews, with an average rating of 6.1/10. The website's critics consensus reads: "Sinking in with as much baleful bite as its namesake, Hyena offers a dark, stylish, and impressively gritty addition to the British crime genre."

=== Accolades ===
Hyena won the main Jury prize at Beaune Film Festival 2015, Best Film at 2014's Sitges Film Festival's Fantàstic Òrbita section and at Les Arcs Film Festival, Peter Ferdinando won the Métronews Best Actor award for his performance in Hyena.

== Soundtrack ==
The soundtrack to Hyena was composed and recorded by Matt Johnson under the moniker The The, his British post-punk genre-busting band known more recently for a series of parallel soundtrack works. Matt is the brother of writer and director Gerard Johnson, and has provided soundtrack input to many of his brother's earlier works including short film Mug and the feature-length Tony.

The soundtrack is a genre-crossing piece rooted in early electronica and ambient genres with a central European influence to reflect the origins of the main villain protagonists.
