= James Henry (writer) =

British comedy writer

James Henry is a British comedy screenwriter, best known for his work on Green Wing, Campus and co-writing ITV's The Delivery Man.

== Career ==
He began his career writing for sketch show Smack the Pony and went on to form the writing team for Green Wing. He has also worked on children's television programs Hey Duggee and Bob the Builder, and would contribute to several other series, such as Shaun the Sheep and Dr. Panda.

He co-hosted a screenwriting podcast with Matthew Graham, Script Rambles, where the two walk and talk about the UK film and TV industry. He has lectured on television at Falmouth University. His Radio 4 sketch show, Wosson Cornwall, was selected as BBC Radio Comedy of the Week and the ITV sitcom Piglets is currently in production.

In 2025, his debut novel, Pagans, was published by Moonflower, and became a Times Top 10 bestseller.

== Filmography ==
Production	Tenure	Broadcaster
Smack the Pony	(1999-2003)	Channel 4
Bob the Builder	(2000-2003)	BBC/CBeebies
Green Wing	(2004-2007)	Channel 4
Horrid Henry	(2007)	CITV
Shaun the Sheep	(2007)	CBBC
Comedy Showcase	(2009)	Channel 4
Campus	(2009-2011)	Channel 4
The Delivery Man	(2015)	ITV
Hey Duggee	(2015-2016)	CBeebies
The Happos Family	(2016)	Boomerang
Taffy	(2017)	Boomerang
Piglets	(2024)	ITV
