= Robert Harley (writer) =

British actor

Robert Harley best known for his work in the sketch show Smack the Pony and the sitcom Green Wing, where he also plays Charles, the CEO of East Hampton Hospital Trust. He has written (with James Henry) The Delivery Man for ITV1. He is the co-founder of independent production company Monicker Pictures.

== Filmography ==
=== Performer ===
- Fast Forward - (1984)
- Paul Merton: The Series - (1991–93)
- The Preventers - (1996) - Craig Sturdy
- Green Wing - (2004 - 2007) - Charles
- Peep Show - (2003) - Barry

=== Writer ===
- The Preventers - (1996)
- Los Dos Bros - (1999-2001)
- Smack the Pony - (1999-2003)
- Green Wing - (2004 - 2007)
- Campus - (2009 - 2011)
- The Delivery Man - (2015 - )

- Piglets - (2024)
