= Exeter Comedy Festival =

- Genre: Arts festival
- Dates: 2026: 3–7 June (exact dates vary each year)
- Locations: Exeter, England
- Founded: 2024; 2 years ago
- Founders: Will Adamsdale, Charlotte Evans and Georgia Thomas

The Exeter Comedy Festival is an annual comedy festival held in Exeter, England every June. First taking place in 2024, it is the largest comedy festival in South West England. The 2026 event features more than 100 different shows.

Founded by Edinburgh Comedy Award winner Will Adamsdale, Charlotte Evans and Georgia Thomas, the festival has been credited with providing performers an alternative to the increasingly expensive Edinburgh Festival Fringe.

== History ==
In 2022, the comedians Will Adamsdale and Charlotte Evans set up Locally Sourced, which at the time was the only new material comedy night in Exeter. Building on its success, they founded the Exeter Comedy Festival in 2024.

Similarly to the Edinburgh Festival Fringe, all of the venues are independent local businesses which temporarily convert into performance spaces for the duration of the festival. There were at least 60 difference shows across 15 venues at the 2025 event, including pubs, hairdressers and piano shops. The acts are a combination of famous famous and strong local comedians.

Notable performers include:

- Josh Widdicombe
- Josie Long
- Tim Key
- Bridget Christie
- Mark Watson
- Sophie Duker
- Daniel Kitson
