= Lisa Jackson =

Lisa Jackson may refer to:

- Lisa F. Jackson (born 1950) American documentary filmmaker
- Lisa P. Jackson (born 1962), former administrator of the U.S. Environmental Protection Agency
- Lisa Jackson (author) (born 1952), American author of romance novels and thrillers
- Lisa Jackson (actress) (born 1979), British actress
- Lisa Jackson (filmmaker) Canadian and Anishinaabe documentary filmmaker
