= Odyssey (2025 film) =

- Directed by: Gerard Johnson
- Release date: 15 August 2025; Edinburgh International Film Festival
- Running time: 110 minutes
- Country: United Kingdom
- Language: English

Odyssey is a 2025 drama film starring Polly Maberly in the role of estate agent Natasha Flynn navigating an increasingly complex life, aspects of which are work pressure, cocaine misuse, and mental collapse

== Cast ==
- Polly Maberly as Natasha Flynn
- Guy Burnet as Dan Haynter
- Jasmine Blackborow as Dylan Rose
- Mikael Persbrandt as The Viking
- Kellie Shirley as Safi
- Tom Davis as Troy
- Rebecca Calder as Sophie Graves
- Cavan Clerkin as George
- Daniel De Bourg as Dom
- Peter Ferdinando as Cowboy
- Charley Palmer Rothwell as Spike Power
- Ryan Hayes as Will Hayter
- Sarah Beck Mather as Charlotte
- Adrian Derrick-Palmer as Goon 4
- Sallieu Sesay as the cab driver
- Adam Lawrence as Luke
- Leon Annor as a Jehovah's Witness
- Nicholas Clarke as the Pallet Man
- Daisy Louve as the Lodge Mistress
- Ben Shafik as Douglas Kelly
- Czeslaw Balon as Terry

== Reception ==
On the review aggregator Rotten Tomatoes website, the film has an approval rating of 93% based on 15 reviews.
