= Darren Boyd =

English actor (born 1971)

- Born: Darren John Boyd; Hastings, Sussex, England
- Occupation: Actor
- Years active: 1998–present
- Children: 2

Darren John Boyd is an English actor. He starred in the Sky One series Spy, for which he won the 2012 BAFTA TV Award for Best Male Comedy Performance. His work in television and film spans comedy and drama.

== Early life ==
Boyd was born in Hastings, Sussex, and began acting at the age of 16, in local theatre productions.

== Career ==
=== Television ===
Boyd co-starred in the BBC comedy Kiss Me Kate (1998), which ran for three years and led to starring roles in British comedies including Hippies (1999), with Simon Pegg, and Smack the Pony (1999). In 2001, Boyd was co-creator and co-writer with Victoria Pile on Los Dos Bros, an off-beat sitcom exploring physical comedy and the relationship between Boyd and Cavan Clerkin as the titular half brothers. The show won a silver rose at Montreux in 2002. During this time Boyd starred alongside Julia Louis-Dreyfus in the NBC series Watching Ellie.

Boyd returned to the UK in 2005, and took roles including Dr. Jake Leaf in the second series of Green Wing (2006) and Jonathan in Steve Coogan's Saxondale. In 2009, he appeared in the two-part adaptation of May Contain Nuts, based on John O'Farrell's novel Personal Affairs for BBC Three, and Royal Wedding (2010), which follows the 1981 Royal Wedding through the perspective of events in a Welsh mining village, written by Abi Morgan and starring Jodie Whittaker.

Boyd starred as Bib in the 2010 BBC sitcom Whites, and co-starred in the BBC Four drama Dirk Gently playing Dirk Gently's business partner Richard MacDuff from 2010 to 2012. In 2011 Boyd played John Cleese in Holy Flying Circus, a 90-minute dramatisation of the controversy over the 1979 release of Monty Python's Life of Brian.

From 2011 to 2013, Boyd starred in the Sky One series Spy, which won him BAFTA Television Award for Best Male Comedy Performance, and also starred in two ITV dramas, Case Sensitive, a series adapted from Sophie Hannah's novel Point of Rescue alongside Olivia Williams, and three-part drama The Guilty.

In 2014, Boyd was reunited with his Watching Ellie costar Julia Louis-Dreyfus in a guest appearance on her HBO series Veep in the episode "Special Relationship".

Boyd played Markus Huseklepp as part of the ensemble cast of Sky Atlantic drama series Fortitude, which premiered in 2015. He briefly returned to comedy in the lead role of Matthew Bunting in the ITV sitcom The Delivery Man.

In 2016, he appeared in dramatic roles opposite Idris Elba in the fourth series of Luther, and opposite James Nesbitt in Stan Lee's Lucky Man.

In 2018, Boyd played Frank Haleton in the British BBC drama series Killing Eve. In 2019, Boyd provided the voice of Mr. Brown in The Adventures of Paddington which aired on the Nick Jr. Channel in 2020.

He played Supt. Dave Minty in the fact-based 2020 BBC drama The Salisbury Poisonings.

Cameos include an evangelical vicar in Rev. and ex-athlete Dave Wellbeck in BBC Olympics mockumentary Twenty Twelve.

In 2021, Boyd appeared in the BBC series The Outlaws.

=== Film ===
Boyd has appeared in feature films including High Heels and Low Lifes (2002), Imagine Me & You (2005), Magicians (2007), Chris Morris' Four Lions (2010), The World's End (2013), Alan Partridge: Alpha Papa (2013), Thomas & Friends: Journey Beyond Sodor (2017) and The Personal History of David Copperfield (2019).

=== Radio ===
Boyd starred as a reluctant arms dealer in the BBC Radio 4 sitcom Safety Catch. He co-starred in ElvenQuest, another Radio 4 sitcom, as Vidar the Elf Lord. In 2018, he appeared as a suspect in the Radio 4 drama, A Small Town Murder.

== Filmography ==
=== Film ===
Year	Title	Role	Notes
2001	High Heels and Low Lifes	Ray	
2005	Imagine Me & You	Cooper	
2007	Magicians	Otto Johnson	
2010	Four Lions	Sniper	
2011	Spoon	Daniel Spoon	
2011	Holy Flying Circus	John Cleese	
2012	Asylum Seekers	Mike	Short film
2013	The World's End	Shane Hawkins	
2013	Underdogs	Amadeo (voice)	UK version
2013	Alan Partridge: Alpha Papa	Detective Sergeant Martin Finch	American title: Alan Partridge
2014	The Longest Drive	Man	Short film
2016	Bridget Jones's Baby	Jeremy	
2017	Journey Beyond Sodor	Theo (voice)	UK and U.S. versions
2019	The Personal History of David Copperfield	Edward Murdstone	

=== Television ===
Year	Title	Role	Notes
1998–2000	Kiss Me Kate	Craig Chapman	22 episodes
1999	Hippies	Hugo Yemp	6 episodes
1999–2003	Smack the Pony	Various characters	26 episodes
2002–2003	Watching Ellie	Ben	16 episodes
2003	Little Robots	Additional Voices (voice)	Unknown episodes
2003	Spine Chillers	Alan	Episode “Fairy Godfather”
2006	Green Wing	Jake Leaf	5 episodes
2008	Little Dorrit	Tite Barnacle Junior	4 episodes
2010	Whites	Bib	6 episodes
2010–2012	Dirk Gently	Richard MacDuff	4 episodes
2011	Mid Morning Matters with Alan Partridge	Daniel Langford	3 episodes
2011	Twenty Twelve	Dave Wellbeck	Episode: "Raising The Bar"
2011–2012	Spy	Tim Elliot	Lead role
2014	Warren United	Warren Kingsley (voice)	6 episodes
2014	Veep	Peter Mitchell	Season 3, episode 7
2015	The Delivery Man	Matthew Bunting	6 episodes
2015	Luther	DCI Theo Bloom	Series 4, episode 1
2015–2018	Fortitude	Markus Husekleppe	18 episodes
2016	National Treasure	Hamish	Episode: "#1.4"
2016–2018	Stan Lee’s Lucky Man	Detective Sergeant Steve Orwell	Series 1–3
2018	Killing Eve	Frank Haleton	5 episodes
2019	Flack	Jeremy	Episode: "Brooke"
2020	The Salisbury Poisonings	Supt. Dave Minty	TV series
2020	Soulmates	Peter	Episode 1
2020–2025	The Adventures of Paddington	Mr. Brown (voice)	
2020–present	Trying	Scott	24 episodes
2021–2024	The Outlaws	John	17 episodes
2024–present	We Might Regret This	Abe	10 episodes
2025	Down Cemetery Road	C.	8 episodes

== Awards and recognition ==
- Los Dos Bros was winner of a Silver Rose for Best Sitcom at the Montreux Festival in 2002.
- Boyd won the Best TV Comedy Actor award at The British Comedy Awards in 2011.
- Nominated for Best Actor in a comedy at the Royal Television Society Awards, 2012.
- Boyd won the British Academy Television Award for Best Male Comedy Performance in 2012.
