= Los Dos Bros =

- Genre: Sitcom
- Created by: Victoria Pile; Darren Boyd; Cavan Clerkin; Ed Roe; Robert Harley
- Starring: Darren Boyd; Cavan Clerkin; Vicki Pepperdine
- Country of origin: United Kingdom
- Original language: English
- No. of series: 1
- No. of episodes: 6 (+1 pilot)

Production
- Producer: Victoria Pile
- Running time: Approx. 24 minutes

Original release
- Network: Channel 4 (pilot): E4 (series)
- Release: 31 August 1999 – 23 May 2001

Los Dos Bros is a British television comedy about two half-brothers (Darren Boyd and Cavan Clerkin) who find themselves in a series of strange situations. They discuss their experiences back to a psychiatrist (Vicki Pepperdine).

The series started life as a Comedy Lab episode in 1999, this formed the basis of a pilot. Two years later a series consisting of six episodes were broadcast. The series was produced by Talkback Productions company for Channel 4.

== Episodes ==
- Comedy Lab: Los Dos Bros - This was the pilot episode broadcast as part of the Comedy Lab series.
- Test Drive - The half-brothers test drive a red monster truck. Things take a turn for the worse as they find themselves on the M25.
- Love and Teeth - The brothers take a trip to the dentist. One of the brothers finds himself falling in love with a female dentist whilst the other brother suffers from a phobia of dentists.
- Date - The half-brothers try to have sex. One brother dates a girl whilst the other ends up babysitting her son.
- Money - The duo go shopping. One brother has money due to having a job, the other does not and ends up envying his wealth.
- Camp - The brothers take some time away from each other to gain independence. The boys hitchhike. One brother ends up camping in a field were a car boot sale takes place, the other gets a job working in a burger van. The two are reunited at the end and meet some European ladies who give them magic mushrooms to try.
- Music - One brother joins a rock band as a bass guitarist, unfortunately the band do not like him. The other brother becomes jealous and lonely.
