= Panto! =

- Opening Titles
- Genre: Comedy Drama
- Written by: John Bishop; Jonathan Harvey
- Directed by: Christine Gernon
- Starring: John Bishop; Sheridan Smith; Chesney Hawkes; Samantha Spiro; Mark Benton; Michael Cochrane; Kaye Wragg; Lisa Jackson; Trevor Dwyer-Lynch; Kenneth Cranham
- Ending theme: Aeroplane
- Country of origin: United Kingdom
- Original language: English
- No. of episodes: 1

Production
- Executive producers: John Bishop; Lisa Thomas; Lindsay Hughes; Henry Normal
- Producer: John Rushton
- Running time: 90 minutes
- Production company: Baby Cow Productions

Original release
- Network: ITV
- Release: 27 December 2012

Panto! is a 2012 one-off Christmas special, made by Baby Cow Productions and broadcast by ITV on Thursday 27 December 2012. The special centres on Lewis Loud, a local Morecambe disk jockey in his stage debut of Dick Whittington at the Grand Theatre, Lancaster as Jack the Lad.

== Plot ==
Lewis Loud (John Bishop) is doing his early morning radio show at Morecambe FM with his less than impressed producer Deborah (Lisa Jackson) at his side.

After the show, Lewis heads to rehearsals for his first ever pantomime Dick Whittington where a romance between him and Dick, Tamsin (Sheridan Smith) has been blossoming. Tamsin is also known as 'Mad Mindy, The Axe Murderer' from the nation's favourite soap. A full dress-rehearsal has been called for the show by Producer Di (Samantha Spiro) as tensions begin to build. Di's nervous daughter Chantelle (Ami Metcalf) stars as the obvious miscast love interest of Dick while Director Francis (Mark Benton) tries hard to pull the show together while Di keeps interfering with his decisions. Johnny Darby (Michael Cochrane) a famous Channel 5 star goes into drag while accident prone Chesney Hawkes tries to make the show. While all this is happening, Lewis' son Paul (played by Bishop's real-life son Daniel) is dropped off with him while Lewis' ex-wife Gina (Kaye Wragg) and her new boyfriend Tony (Trevor Dwyer-Lynch) go on an exotic holiday that they won by creating a jingle for a toilet company.

Tamsin gets offered by her agent Jerry (Kenneth Cranham) to go on Celebrity Sleigh Ride, a new reality show which sees celebrities battling to the North Pole with a vote-off day to day. Tamsin takes the offer with her agent also offering Lewis to go but he declines to face his responsibility with Paul. The cast is then reformed to match the show with Paul playing the cat and Greg Chip (Dean Whatton) the original cat playing Dick. Gina dumps Tony to be on her own after coming back from the airport after their flights were cancelled as the toilet company went bust.

At the end, Lewis plays football with Paul after the show was a success.

== Characters ==
- John Bishop as Lewis Loud
- Sheridan Smith as Tamsin Taylor
- Samantha Spiro as Di Jenkins
- Daniel Bishop as Paul
- Michael Cochrane as Johnny Darby
- Chesney Hawkes as himself
- Mark Benton as Francis de Winter
- Ami Metcalf as Chantelle Jenkins
- Dean Whatton as Greg Chip
- Kaye Wragg as Gina
- Trevor Dwyer-Lynch as Tony
- John MacMillan as Finlay
- Lisa Jackson as Deborah
- Kenneth Cranham as Jerry
