= Pulling (TV series) =

- Genre: Sitcom
- Created by: Sharon Horgan; Dennis Kelly
- Developed by: Harry Thompson
- Written by: Sharon Horgan; Dennis Kelly
- Directed by: Tristram Shapeero
- Starring: Sharon Horgan; Tanya Franks; Rebekah Staton; Cavan Clerkin
- Country of origin: United Kingdom
- Original language: English
- No. of series: 2
- No. of episodes: 13

Production
- Executive producer: Daisy Goodwin
- Producer: Phil Bowker
- Production locations: London, England
- Running time: 30 minutes (final episode 1 hour)

Original release
- Network: BBC Three
- Release: 23 November 2006 – 17 May 2009

Pulling is a British sitcom produced by Silver River Productions and broadcast on BBC Three. The show follows three single female friends who live in Hackney, East London. It was co-written by Sharon Horgan and Dennis Kelly and stars Horgan as Donna, Tanya Franks as Karen, Rebekah Staton as Louise, and Cavan Clerkin as Karl. Pulling was the last comedy show developed by Harry Thompson before his death.

The first series of six episodes was first shown in 2006 on BBC Three, then repeated on BBC Two in early 2008. A second six-episode series of Pulling aired on BBC Three from 23 March to 27 April 2008, and a final one-hour episode aired on BBC Three on 17 May 2009.

In 2007, the series was BAFTA-nominated for Best Situation Comedy while Horgan won a British Comedy Award for Best Comedy Entertainment Actress in 2008. In the same year, it was announced that Pulling had been cancelled by BBC Three.

== Main characters ==
The main characters are Donna, who works in an office, Louise, who is a waitress and Karen, a school teacher.

== Episodes ==
=== Series 1 ===
No. overall	No. in series	Title	Original release date
1	1	"Episode one"	23 November 2006
Donna prepares to attend her hen night and is disappointed to find it is being held at a bingo hall. Later, she and her friends move on to a nightclub, where Donna decides that single women have more fun. The day before her wedding is due to take place, she ends her five-year relationship with Karl. His mother reacts angrily to that because of the time and money she has spent on planning their cancelled wedding.
2	2	"Episode two"	23 November 2006
Donna tries to make herself appealing to employers. Karen cries in front of her class only to be subsequently placed under suspension for numerous incidents. Louise begins to date Karen's latest conquest, but he instead has sex with Karen again.
3	3	"Episode three"	30 November 2006
Karl tries to kill himself in his flat, but is saved by Donna when she finds him hanging by a noose. Donna is eager to go to a club, but is worried about Karl's mental state, so she asks her friend Tanya – whose husband has left her – to look after him whilst she goes out for the night. Karen is being stalked by middle-aged married man Mark, whom she had a fling with.
4	4	"Episode four"	7 December 2006
Donna wakes up on her thirtieth birthday to find herself in bed with a barman from the local nightclub. Louise decides to find a gift for Donna on the Internet, but inadvertently researches porn instead. She tries to find new friends via an Internet site. She naively misunderstands the nature of the sites she visits and is surprised and puzzled when her 'new friend' takes her dogging. Karen expects some money to arrive from Mark, but discovers he died of a heart attack the previous day. She goes to his funeral to try to obtain what she is owed, and takes his son to the pub.
5	5	"Episode five"	14 December 2006
Donna, Karen and Louise go out to a nightclub with Louise's boss Richard, where Donna meets Sam and gets his phone number. Donna invites Richard – whom she believes to be gay – home. They have a one-night stand, which she quickly regrets. Sam rejects Donna when he finds out that she had sex with Richard. Karen tells Louise that she has not gone more than a week without sex since she was 12. Karen tries to give up alcohol, but doing so worsens her personality. Louise has not had sex in nearly two years, so she decides to be less choosy and asks Lithuanian colleague Oleg on a date. They go to his place, but he lives in very overcrowded conditions, so they go back to the flat. She asks him for sex and tells him she does not want a relationship with him. He rejects her offer.
6	6	"Episode six"	21 December 2006
Louise's mother Eileen arrives, upset that her 17-year-old toyboy, Skinzo, has ended their relationship. Karen, Louise and Eileen go out to a club, where Eileen gets drunk and meets a middle-aged man whom she has a one-night stand with. Skinzo comes to the house and Eileen leaves with him. Sam plans a weekend away with Donna and his friends, but she is unenthusiastic. Sam takes Donna to an art gallery; he likes the exhibits, but she does not. She watches Miss Congeniality 2 with Karl. Sam gives Donna an ultimatum: it is either Karl or him.

=== Series 2 ===
No. overall	No. in series	Title	Original release date
7	1	"Episode one"	23 March 2008
Donna spends her evening bored, alone at home whilst all her friends are busy. Tanya finds Karl in a club and they have sex in his kitchen. Donna is angry with Karl for having sex with one of her friends. Oleg intends to return to Lithuania, but changes his mind and stays. Louise is disappointed when he falls asleep while she is fellating him. He still wants a relationship with her, but she does not. Karen bumps into her ex Billy in the pub. They get drunk, take drugs and have sex.
8	2	"Episode two"	30 March 2008
Donna meets up with an old school friend, Catherine, whom she tries to impress. Donna finds Catherine boring. Catherine is in an unhappy relationship and envies Donna. Louise dates Mike, a reformed flasher. Billy tells Karen that he married an Argentinian cleaner to enable her to stay in the country – and that she is now divorcing him, costing him a lot. All six gather at the flat, where Billy tells Karen that he and Karen scared her off by burning her house down and that she is going back to Argentina. Billy and Mike leave separately. Catherine kisses Donna, which she is puzzled and angry about. Catherine leaves.
9	3	"Episode three"	6 April 2008
Donna's boss, Ian, finds out that his 58-year-old mother Ena has died and is consoled by Donna. She thinks she has a talent for counselling. Louise becomes acting manager of the café while Richard is away. A depressed artist visits the café and asks her to display his feces-based paintings in the café. She agrees to, despite not having authorisation to do so by Richard. The paintings repel customers. Karen discovers an ill cat in her bedroom and decides to keep it. She takes it to a vet, who tells her that the cat has cancer and needs an operation that will cost £700. She asks the vet to euthanise it, but Karen thinks the fee for that is too high, so Karen takes it home where she and Louise kill it with a brick in the garden. Karl is invited to a dinner party by Tanya, but realises she is treating him like a new partner and a father to her son. She asks Donna to break up with Tanya for her. During the conversation between Tanya and Donna, Tanya tells Donna that she does not want Karl any more.
10	4	"Episode four"	13 April 2008
Donna, Karen and Louise go out to celebrate Louise's birthday. Despite agreeing that it is a 'girls night', Karen soon leaves in a taxi with Christopher, a young man whom she just met, and they go back to the flat. In the morning, Karen throws Christopher out. Louise then confronts Karen about leaving last night, which results in an argument and insults. Louise leaves the flat and stays with Richard. She tells him that she has a business idea, and encourages her to go ahead with it. He introduces her to businessman Ivor to help her realise the plan. Her product is Cockloleeze, which are penis-shaped ice lollies. Richard dislikes the idea, but Ivor likes it and says he will contact his business partner to try to arrange from them to be produced and put on the market. Donna buys a kebab from a takeaway. Seconds after leaving, it is snatched from her in the street. She tells Louise and a policeman, but neither takes it seriously. Donna visits Karl, who assures her that it was a real crime. Richard and Oleg ridicule her about taking the theft seriously. Donna goes to the police station, where a different policeman refuses to take her theft report seriously. She steals his sandwich to make a point, and is arrested. She is released eight hours later, and Karl picks her up. He tells her that he is selling his house, which Donna is disappointed with despite her not having bought it or lived in it. Donna sees the thief at a bus stop, and tells Karl. The two confront the thief and take from him the amount of money that Donna paid for the kebab. Donna and Karl go to a bar, where they kiss. Karen apologises to Louise and invites her to dinner. Louise has a meeting in relation to her Cockloleeze later that day, so Karen says that they will not drink alcohol. They go back to the flat, where Louise passes out whilst drunk.
11	5	"Episode five"	20 April 2008
Karen wants to break up with Justin, but finds doing so difficult because he often cries. She eventually does so. Louise realises that she has accidentally shoplifted. She is pleased and goes on to shoplift many times. She puts two items in an elderly male customer's pockets, then walks out. He tries to stop her outside the shop and calls a security guard. She reports the old man to the security guard for shoplifting and she escapes. Karl's house is up for sale at an estate agent for £320,000, which is £80,000 more that he bought it for ten months ago. Donna is horrified that Karl is set to make a huge profit and emigrate to Tuscany, Italy, where he intends to buy land. She visits his mother, Margaret, to try to persuade her to talk Karl out of emigrating, but she angrily tells her to get out of her house and Karl's life. Donna suggests to Karl that they get back together; he refuses to.
12	6	"Episode six"	27 April 2008
Karen takes a pregnancy test, which is positive. She has decided not to have an abortion. Louise tells Billy about the pregnancy and he turns up drunk at her school, then at the house with gifts for her. He convinces her to have the baby. When she sees her doctor, he tells her that she is not pregnant and that she has genital warts. Louise is strongly attracted to a man who is a customer in her café. Donna decides to try to distract herself from Karl emigrating by sleeping around. She has a one-night stand with one man. She then meets another but decides not have sex with him and hits him and rejects him for being creepy. She has sex with Karl, then he leaves.

=== 2009 episode ===
No.	Title	Original release date
13	"Final Special"	17 May 2009
Louise returns from travelling for six months with a new man in tow – she detests him but he saved her life when she nearly drowned in mud, so she stays with him out of guilt. Karen also has a new boyfriend who has turned her into a quiet, homely girlfriend who doesn't wear make up and thinks women's rights are overrated – and before long she bumps into ex-boyfriend Billy who is very ill and is making himself feel better with drink and narcotics. Donna is seeing a rich businessman who only cares about his money (her birthday treat is having sex on a bed laid out with £4500 in £10, £20 and £50 notes), but she is too shallow to leave him. Karl is back from Italy with a new Italian girlfriend, and much to Donna's horror, they share an open relationship. And lastly, Tanya and Oleg have become engaged, but they share a very volatile relationship that is based upon passion and sex. By the end of the episode, each of the main characters reach some sort of resolution. Louise, initially distraught at having to stick with a relationship out of guilt is overjoyed when her current boyfriend ends up in a coma, and she finds contentment in doting on him. Karen is quickly tempted back to her former ways by Billy, but it is dismayed when she discovers he has been lying about being terminally ill. Nonetheless, the return to her old ways prompts her to cut ties with her current, controlling partner and in the final scene of the episode she is seen marrying Billy whilst intoxicated. Donna and Karl meanwhile make a kind of reconciliation when Donna finally dumps the arrogant Stefan and Karl's new fiancé is revealed to be cheating on him.

== Cancellation ==
Pulling was not renewed for a third series by BBC Three controller Danny Cohen. Instead the channel opted for a one-hour-special to "tie up loose ends" of the show's narrative.

The Guardian reported that news of the cancellation "perplexed those involved with the show" and that "insiders criticised Cohen's decision" especially as Pulling had "nearly doubled its [viewing] figures" since the first series and had "outperformed BBC3's average share both for the slot and for prime time in 2007, beating the slot average by 41% for the younger demographic". The show had also fared well critically and had been nominated for a BAFTA award.

The newspaper reported that sources had "claimed the decision was because the show no longer fitted in with the target audience of BBC3, which is being focused on a younger age group". Commenting on the cancellation, Cohen said: "Pulling has had two fantastic series on BBC3 and we've committed to an hour-long finale episode as a mark of its quality". He justified the decision by saying he had to cancel the series to make room for new shows on the channel: "In an ideal world, we would recommission many more of our comedies... Every recommission means one less space for a new project."

In response to the news of the show's cancellation The Guardian published an article, "Popular but pulled", about various popular TV shows that have been unexpectedly axed. The article reported, "Irate supporters [of the show] set up a Facebook page called Save Pulling. At the time of writing [April 2009], however, the group only had 1,049 members - with a good third of those being media or comedy professionals." Kelly was also quoted as saying, "We were quite disappointed - and quite surprised - by the decision to cancel as the show was doing really well, had won awards and I believed Danny [Cohen, BBC3 controller] liked it." Cohen said, "We didn't cancel Pulling, we just commissioned it in a different form [as a special]".

In a 2010 interview Kelly and Horgan said they still didn't understand why the BBC refused to make a third series, with Kelly saying they "cried" and "threw ourselves at their feet" in desperation to have another series made.

== Home media ==
Both series have been released on DVD, although the final episode has only been released as a digital download in the UK. The final episode was included in the Region 4 DVD set available in Australasia.
