= High Heels and Low Lifes =

2001 action comedy-drama film by Mel Smith

- Theatrical release poster
- Directed by: Mel Smith
- Screenplay by: Kim Fuller
- Story by: Kim Fuller; Georgia Pritchett
- Produced by: Uri Fruchtmann; Barnaby Thompson
- Starring: Minnie Driver; Mary McCormack; Kevin McNally; Michael Gambon; Darren Boyd
- Cinematography: Steven Chivers
- Edited by: Chris Blunden
- Music by: Charlie Mole
- Production companies: Touchstone Pictures; Fragile Films
- Distributed by: Buena Vista Pictures Distribution
- Release dates: 16 July 2001 (United Kingdom); 26 October 2001 (United States)
- Running time: 86 minutes
- Countries: United Kingdom; United States
- Language: English
- Budget: $10 million
- Box office: $2.3 million

High Heels and Low Lifes is a 2001 action comedy-drama film starring Minnie Driver, Mary McCormack, Kevin McNally, Mark Williams, Danny Dyer and Michael Gambon. It was directed by Mel Smith and written by Kim Fuller and Georgia Pritchett.

== Plot ==
The film follows the story of two women living in London, Shannon and Frances, attempting to con a group of gangsters, led by Kerrigan and Mason, into giving them £1,000,000 after they overhear a conversation between gang members during a local bank heist. The idea is that the money will later be used to purchase a large amount of expensive medical equipment for the hospital where Shannon works as an overworked and underpaid nurse. Frances, a failing American actress who has resorted to doing voice acting for children's cartoons, wants the money so that she can get out of the rut she believes she is stuck in, and also because she wants a Mercedes to replace her aging Pontiac Firebird.

Throughout the course of the film, the women threaten the mobsters in order to persuade them to give them a cut of the heist money. As the film progresses, the danger the women are in becomes more obvious, and just as it appears that they are out of their depth – Frances' car is blown up and Shannon is almost kidnapped – they successfully break into Mason's house and confront him and one of his gang. A mass shoot-out occurs after it becomes clear that the girls have stolen all of Mason's guns and have bagged all the money. They manage to get away in the gang members' Porsche Boxster with the bags of money. The hospital equipment is delivered to Shannon's hospital anonymously, as Shannon and Frances look on. They then drive off into London in the Mercedes CLK that they have bought with some of the money, happy that they have done the right thing.

== Cast ==
- Minnie Driver as Shannon
- Mary McCormack as Frances
- Kevin McNally as Alan Mason
- Mark Williams as Tremaine
- Len Collin as Barry
- Danny Dyer as Danny Robinson
- Darren Boyd as Ray
- Michael Gambon as Kerrigan
- Kevin Eldon as McGill
- Hugh Bonneville as Farmer
- Mel Smith as Man at Train Station (uncredited)
- Ben Farrow as Julian

== Reception ==
The film earned negative reviews from critics, as it holds a rating of 20% on Rotten Tomatoes.

== Home media ==
In the United States, Buena Vista released High Heels and Low Lives on DVD on 9 April 2002, while Mill Creek Entertainment later acquired home distribution rights, releasing the film on 15 March 2016, as part of a "Pretty Dumb Criminals: Triple Felony Feature" (with Big Trouble and Mafia!).

In the United Kingdom, the film was made available on both VHS and DVD formats on 13 May 2002 via Buena Vista Home Entertainment.

Buena Vista also handled distribution rights in Australia, when the film was made available on DVD on 21 August 2002.

High Heels and Low Lifes was released on Blu-ray on 23 October 2018, by Kino Lorber under licence from Disney within the United States.
