= Piglets (TV series) =

British police comedy television series

- Written by: Victoria Pile; Robert Harley; James Henry; Oriane Messina; Fay Rusling; Omar Khan; Abiola Ogunbiyi; Nusrath Tapadar; Farhan Solo; Alex Bertulis-Fernandes
- Directed by: Victoria Pile; Sam Leifer
- Starring: Mark Heap; Sarah Parish; Rebecca Humphries; Ukweli Roach; Ricky Champ; Callie Cooke
- Country of origin: United Kingdom
- Original language: English
- No. of series: 2
- No. of episodes: 12

Production
- Producers: Victoria Pile; Caroline Leddy; Robert Harley; Sam Leifer
- Running time: 22 minutes
- Production company: Monicker Pictures

Original release
- Network: ITV1 (series 1); ITV2 (series 2); ITVX
- Release: 20 July 2024 – 19 February 2026

Piglets is a British comedy series set in a police training college. The first series was broadcast on ITV1 and streamed on ITVX on 20 July 2024. Later that year, it was renewed for a second series, which broadcast on ITV2 and streamed on ITVX on 15 January 2026.

== Premise ==
Six new police recruits attend a fictional police training college.

== Cast ==
- Mark Heap as Superintendent Bob Weekes
- Sarah Parish as Superintendent Julie Spry
- Rebecca Humphries as Melanie
- Ukweli Roach as Mike
- Ricky Champ as Daz
- Callie Cooke as Steph
- Sam Pote as Leggo
- Sukh Kaur Ojla as Geeta
- Halema Hussain as Afia
- Abdul Sessay as Dev
- Jamie Bisping as Paul

== Production ==
From Monicker Pictures, the series is written by Victoria Pile, Robert Harley, James Henry, Oriane Messina, and Fay Rusling who all previously collaborated on the Channel 4 comedy series Green Wing.

Piglets is directed by Sam Leifer and Victoria Pile and produced by Victoria Pile, Caroline Leddy, Robert Harley and Sam Leifer. The writers were also joined by ITV's Comedy Writers Initiative candidate Omar Khan and new writers Abiola Ogunbiyi, Nusrath Tapadar, Farhan Solo and Alex Bertulis-Fernandes.

The cast includes Mark Heap, Sarah Parish and Rebecca Humphries, whilst the new recruits are played by Callie Cooke, Sam Pote, Sukh Kaur Ojla, Halema Hussain, Abdul Sessay, and Jamie Bisping.

Filming took place in London from January to February 2024.

A second series was confirmed to be in production in November 2024 with filming scheduled for early 2025.

== Release ==
The series was made available on ITVX on 20 July 2024 and premiered on ITV1 on the same day.

== Reception ==
The Police Federation of England and Wales called the series "highly offensive" before its release, with particular condemnation being levelled at its title for referring to the derogatory slang word "pig" used for police forces both in the United Kingdom and elsewhere. The Federation's demands for a change of title went unheeded, with ITV saying that the title was "a comedic and endearing play on words to emphasise the innocence and youth of [the training college's] young trainees".

Lucy Mangan of The Guardian gave the series three stars out of five but concluded that after "the first couple of episodes you are longing for Piglets to stop pulling its punches and embrace the absurdity, or to cut its losses and settle into ordinary sitcom territory. As it is, it falls between two stools and lands with a bit of an uncomedic splat."

Writing in the Evening Standard, Vicky Jessop gave the series one star out of five, writing that its jokes "aren't funny, and it's honestly a bit insulting that the script thinks the viewers will think they are. Primary school-level toilet humour abounds, as do the bad puns [...] both depressingly predictable and also just plain depressing."

Nick Hilton's review in The Independent rated the series as worth only two stars out of five, writing that it "looks like a rush job. The characters are underdeveloped, their relationships undercooked. The comedy is puerile and intermittent; too many of the jokes are missing a proper punchline."

Reviewing the series in The Daily Telegraph, Anita Singh gave it two stars out of five, calling it a "so-so comedy" and saying that it "has its amusing moments [...] but overall it is pretty weak stuff. Too often it mistakes crudeness for humour."

In the i, Rachael Sigee gave the series two stars out of five, calling it "dire" and "completely unremarkable" with a script "which strived for absurdity but never came close to going far enough", deeming it inferior to the writing team's earlier Green Wing, and saying that the controversy over its title was more interesting.

In a more positive review, The Times' Ben Dowell gave the series four stars out of five, saying that comedy fans would "probably" see the series' similarity to Green Wing as "a good thing" and that it was mostly "clever, rude, decidedly weird and sharply funny", though he did note that some jokes felt "a little forced, and you can see some of the punchlines coming, if not a mile off, certainly a few feet away."
