= Spy (2011 TV series) =

- Genre: Sitcom
- Created by: Simeon Goulden
- Written by: Simeon Goulden
- Directed by: Ben Taylor (Series 1); John Henderson (Series 2)
- Starring: Darren Boyd; Jude Wright; Robert Lindsay; Dolly Wells
- Composer: Oli Julian
- Country of origin: United Kingdom
- Original language: English
- No. of series: 2
- No. of episodes: 17 (list of episodes)

Production
- Producers: Simeon Goulden; Margot Gavan Duffy (Series 1); Charlie Leech (Series 2)
- Editors: Anthony Boys (Series 1); David Yardley (Series 2); James Cooper (Series 2)
- Running time: 30 minutes (inc. adverts)
- Production company: Hat Trick Productions

Original release
- Network: Sky 1
- Release: 14 October 2011 – 26 December 2012

Spy is a British sitcom created and written by Simeon Goulden. The first series aired on 14 October 2011 on Sky 1 in the UK, as well as on the streaming service Hulu in the United States. A second series began airing on 19 October 2012, ending with a Christmas Special on 26 December 2012. On 1 March 2013, Darren Boyd announced that the show would not be returning for a third series.

== Cast and characters ==
- Darren Boyd as Tim Elliot
- Jude Wright as Marcus Elliot, Tim's ten-and-a-half year-old son
- Robert Lindsay as The Examiner, Tim's boss
- Dolly Wells as Judith Elliot, Tim's ex-wife
- Tom Goodman-Hill (series 1) and Mark Heap (series 2) as Philip Quil, Judith's partner and Marcus's headteacher
- Mathew Baynton as Chris Pitt-Goddard, Tim's friend and former colleague who is secretly a lawyer
- Rebekah Staton as Caitlin Banks, Tim's MI5 colleague
- Rosie Cavaliero as Paula Abdul, Marcus's first social worker who had a romantic obsession with Tim
- Ed Coleman as Moritz Skenk, Tim's hapless coworker
- Ellie Hopkins as Justine, Marcus's love interest
- Terence Maynard as Marion Portis, Caitlin's long-missing, assumed dead, fiancé
- Miles Jupp as Owen, Marcus's second social worker
- Frank Kauer as Nick Chin, Marcus's rival
- David K. S. Tse as David Chin, Nick's father

== Episode list ==
=== Series 1 (2011) ===
No. overall	No. in series	Title	Directed by	Written by	Original release date	UK viewers (millions)
1	1	"Codename: Loser"	Ben Taylor	Simeon Goulden	14 October 2011	0.89
Tim Elliot (Boyd), a divorced and single father disliked by his precocious son Marcus (Wright) and ex-wife Judith (Wells), decides to quit his job as a sales assistant in a computing store. From the Job Centre he learns of a data processing position in Westminster. Unbeknownst to him, he is taking an exam for MI5, and passes to be a spy. When the bosses, including the Examiner (Lindsay) learn of the misunderstanding, they still offer him the position anyway, and Tim accepts.
2	2	"Codename: Tramp"	Ben Taylor	Simeon Goulden	21 October 2011	0.90
During a training exercise, where he is to collect a bag of intelligence in an empty building, Tim comes across a homeless Eastern European man who falls during a struggle. Tim is viewed as a hero in the public eye for saving him, but the Examiner orders Tim to kill him, a mission which he is reluctant to carry out. Despite this, the man ends up electrocuted thanks to the faulty wiring in Tim's house. In the meantime, Tim also has to deal with a social worker named Paula (Cavaliero) to improve his relationship with Marcus. However, he realises Paula is insane, and she tends to think they are in a relationship.
3	3	"Codename: Grades"	Ben Taylor	Simeon Goulden	28 October 2011	0.76
Tim learns how to computer hack, and decides to lower Marcus's school grades. His friend Chris (Baynton) also uses these skills to alter his bank details and gain money. Marcus and Chris develop a bond, but Chris is ultimately caught by the authorities for hacking the bank. Paula continues to make unwanted advances towards Tim.
4	4	"Codename: Bookclub"	Ben Taylor	Simeon Goulden	4 November 2011	0.71
Tim has a large interest in joining Marcus' lavish book club, but is prohibited from taking part. Unknown to him, Marcus actually runs a different kind of club, and the "book club" is really a cover. Eventually, Marcus allows his father to join the club, just as he decides to end it. Meanwhile, the Examiner demonstrates his lie-detecting skills.
5	5	"Codename: Blood"	Ben Taylor	Simeon Goulden	11 November 2011	0.82
Tim swaps blood samples with the Examiner. However, it is revealed there are drugs in the Examiner's system, and Tim is forced to attend a drug intervention programme, run by none other than Paula. She further embarrasses Tim by having his family made aware of his attendance in the intervention. Paula forces him to read that he has feelings for her, but he refuses after it is emerged he has feeling for Caitlin, a colleague at MI5. Furthermore, ex-wife Judith informs Tim of a child custody hearing so she could keep Marcus. Marcus meanwhile, is given a taste of power in his school, which he abuses.
6	6	"Codename: Portis"	Ben Taylor	Simeon Goulden	18 November 2011	Under 0.61
The custody hearing is not going in Tim's favour, until Chris steps in as his lawyer and wins the case, on the condition that Tim confess his feelings for Caitlin. Judith sleeps with the incompetent judge in order to win the case, however he has already sent off the case. Tim, going to confess his love to Caitlin, finds her kissing her presumed dead fiancé, an American CIA agent, Portis (Maynard). As their final training exercise, the Examiner creates a false security breach in MI5. At the conclusion of the exercise, Tim becomes an official MI5 agent.

=== Series 2 (2012) ===
No. overall	No. in series	Title	Directed by	Written by	Original release date	UK viewers (millions)
7	1	"Codename: Growing Rogue"	John Henderson	Simeon Goulden	19 October 2012	0.50
Marcus runs for school president, but is facing competition from a new boy at school, Nick. Tim and Chris perform surveillance on Nick and discover that he is paying off the school's new headmaster. Despite having the leverage he needs, Marcus forfeits his nomination. Meanwhile, Caitlin and Portis have trouble reconnecting, and Tim attempts to keep them apart so he could win Caitlin's affections. However this ultimately fails, as the Examiner has the two have sex in the bathroom. As of this episode, Tim's family is being assessed by a new social worker to determine who should have custody of Marcus.
8	2	"Codename: Riding High"	John Henderson	Simeon Goulden	26 October 2012	0.48
Tim is assigned to look after Elaine (Anna Skellern), a woman on a witness protection scheme who was exposed by The Examiner. She quickly seduces Tim. Realising Tim is not his usual self, Judith, Chris, Owen and The Examiner work together to stop Elaine. Eventually, Caitlin convinces Tim that Elaine is crazy. Meanwhile, Marcus tries to learn how to ride a bicycle in order to beat Nick, but it does not go according to plan. Chris becomes a physical education (PE) teacher, even though he has no interest in it. Marcus aids Tim's escape as The Examiner gets hold of Elaine.
9	3	"Codename: Lie Hard"	John Henderson	Simeon Goulden	2 November 2012	0.44
By orders of Marcus' school, Tim is forced to send his son to his work place, even though he would be fired for revealing his true profession to anybody. Tim makes every effort possible to hide the building's true purpose, though this eventually gets him into trouble when an MI6 agent arrests the two, convinced they are enemy Russian spies. During this time, Marcus confronts Tim about his job. Meanwhile, The Examiner accidentally takes medicine that makes him hallucinate; he believes Marcus to be a figment of his imagination. Owen fails to seduce Judith. Tim and Marcus manage to escape from the MI6 agent.
10	4	"Codename: Mistaken Identity"	John Henderson	Simeon Goulden	9 November 2012	Under 0.48
After The Examiner makes an overly threatening recruitment video and is told he needs a new one he selects Tim and Caitlin to star in the new one. Meanwhile, Marcus is tricked into competing against Nick in a television quiz show that puts two fathers and sons against each other. Embarrassed of Tim, Marcus asks Chris to step in as his father and he agrees. Tim and Caitlin tell the Examiner that they can't do the video anymore because it will reveal their identities, so they end up doing it in wigs. Tim goes home in his wig and steps in for Chris after Chris finds out the quiz is on TV (he had a traumatizing experience on TV before). Tim and Marcus do well because Tim has an ear piece in and Chris is giving him the answers from the bathroom, until he is found and tied up by the opposition. Tim and Marcus end up winning because Tim correctly recites the chemical make-up of dynamite, even though the other team answered it "correctly".
11	5	"Codename: Family Bonds"	John Henderson	Simeon Goulden	16 November 2012	Under 0.41
Any chance of a rekindled romance between Tim and Judith was a long shot, however those odds shrink remarkably, when Judith receives a blow to the head and comes to thinking she's still married to the sleuth. Philip is devastated, but on hand to pick up the pieces is Chris, who believes the best course of action is to reintroduce him to the dating scene right away. While that's going on, Owen tries to help Marcus with his music recital.
12	6	"Codename: Citizen Lame"	John Henderson	Simeon Goulden	23 November 2012	0.44
Marcus is obnoxiously bright and the kind of child you imagine becoming a world leader one day, or, alternatively, criminal mastermind. After being sent on work experience, however, he develops a taste for retail. Elsewhere, it's no surprise to learn that The Examiner's appraisal doesn't go too well, considering his unorthodox approach to his job.
13	7	"Codename: Ball Busted"	John Henderson	Simeon Goulden	30 November 2012	Under 0.46
Marcus's hopes of organising the Summer Ball are dashed when Mrs Godfrey usurps Philip as the school head teacher. Meanwhile, Owen and The Examiner help a struggling Tim to find a date and improve his luck with the ladies. Maybe he should take a leaf out of Bond's book.
14	8	"Codename: Double Oh"	John Henderson	Simeon Goulden	7 December 2012	Under 0.44
After discovering he has an apparent-genius MI5 body double, Tim agrees to compete for custody of Marcus. Moritz, meanwhile, is asking for trouble when he crosses all sorts of lines by trying to woo a hostage's worried girlfriend.
15	9	"Codename: Pulp Friction"	John Henderson	Simeon Goulden	14 December 2012	Under 0.47
Chris' bid to turn Marcus into a celebrated author backfires when he pretends that Marcus is dying. Meanwhile, Portis busily prepares for Caitlin's birthday, but fails to factor in a major obstacle in the form of saboteur Tim.
16	10	"Codename: Last Scupper"	John Henderson	Simeon Goulden	21 December 2012	Under 0.40
Tim is given extra incentive to rekindle his romance with Caitlin after, thanks to Moritz, finding himself on an assassin's hit list. Marcus, meanwhile, has been biding his time and is in prime position to humiliate rival Nick at Justine's dinner party.

=== Christmas Special (2012) ===
No. overall	No. in series	Title	Directed by	Written by	Original release date	UK viewers (millions)
17	1	"Codename: Show Stopper"	John Henderson	Simeon Goulden	26 December 2012	Under 0.32
Portis suspects that Caitlin has feelings for someone else and plots his revenge. Marcus' plans for the Christmas party go awry. Philip and Judith contemplate taking things to another level. (Double length: 45 minutes rather than 23 minutes)

== Reception ==
Reception of the series has been varied. Olly Grant of The Telegraph described the new series as "a very promising little comedy, and [Robert] Lindsay is particularly good in it." The premiere was described by Ben Arnold (The Guardian) as a "hopeful offering", but wrote, "It will need considerably more laughs in future episodes to stand repeat viewing." The series' second episode was termed "mediocre" by Catherine Gee (Telegraph), but Jack Seale (Radio Times) wrote "never mind that everyone's crazy and nothing is real, so that – like a lot of US sitcoms – you wouldn't mind missing an episode. When you're in front of it, Spy keeps doling out quick, cheap, satisfying laughs." In a 2011 year-end wrap-up, Julia Raeside (Guardian) wrote:

Spy on Sky1 was for me the surprise sitcom hit of the year. Darren Boyd has been solidly delivering funny best friends and boyfriends for years, so it was great to see him taking the lead in such a brilliantly written show. It makes stunning use of physical comedy and the gags come thick and fast.

In 2012, Sam Wollaston (Guardian) described it as "totally ridiculous, but in a charming way" and having "a lovable silliness."

== DVD release ==
The complete first series of Spy was released on DVD on 5 November 2012. The complete second series of Spy was released on DVD on 29 July 2013.

== International remakes ==
An American version was being discussed to broadcast on ABC. ABC released casting info for the show, with Rob Corddry being cast as Tim, Mason Cook as Marcus, Paget Brewster in the new role of Erica as Marcus' mom and Tim's ex-wife, replacing Judith, Moshe Kasher as Chris, Camille Guaty as Caitlin, and Ken Jeong as The Examiner. Nat Faxon was to guest star in the pilot, and if the series was picked up, would have been a guest star in as many episodes as possible. The show was to be produced by ABC Studios and Hat Trick Productions, with Simeon Goulden, Jimmy Mulville and Helen Williams as executive producers. The series was to be written by Simeon Goulden as well, with Alex Hardcastle directing the pilot. On 10 May 2013, Deadline reported that ABC had passed on the pilot.
