= Elisa Lasowski =

French actress

- Born: Elisa Wald-Lasowski; November 15, 1984 (age 41); The Hague, South Holland, Netherlands
- Education: Drama Studio London
- Occupation: Actress
- Years active: 2007–present
- Known for: Somers Town; Hyena; Blackstar; Versailles

Elisa Wald-Lasowski (born 15 November 1984) is a French actress, most notable for her film and television work. She grew up in the Netherlands, Algeria and France. She is fluent in French, English, Spanish, Dutch, Japanese and German.

== Acting ==
Lasowski has acted roles in productions including Eastern Promises (2007), Somers Town (2008), Line of Duty (2012), Game of Thrones (2013), Hyena (2014), Burnt (2015), Versailles (2015-2018), and Kompromat (2022). She appeared as the "girl with a tail" in the music video for David Bowie's song "Blackstar".

In November 2018, she became the face of a new Loewe fragrance.
