= The Following Events Are Based on a Pack of Lies =

British television series

- Created by: Penelope Skinner; Ginny Skinner
- Screenplay by: Penelope Skinner; Ginny Skinner
- Directed by: Robbie McKillop; Nicole Charles
- Starring: Marianne Jean-Baptiste; Alistair Petrie; Rebekah Staton
- Country of origin: United Kingdom
- Original language: English
- No. of series: 1
- No. of episodes: 5

Production
- Executive producers: Naomi de Pear; Lydia Hampson; Alice Tyler; Penelope Skinner; Ginny Skinner; Jo McClellan
- Producer: Georgie Fallon
- Running time: 56 minutes
- Production companies: BBC Studios; Sister

Original release
- Network: BBC One
- Release: 29 August – 26 September 2023

The Following Events Are Based on a Pack of Lies is a 2023 British five-part television drama series starring Marianne Jean-Baptiste, Alistair Petrie, and Rebekah Staton.

== Synopsis ==
Cheryl and Alice are two women without too much in common, but they do inadvertently share the same conman.

== Cast and characters ==
- Marianne Jean-Baptiste as Cheryl Harker
- Alistair Petrie as Dr Robert Chance/Robbie Graham
- Rebekah Staton as Alice Newman
- Romola Garai as Juno Fish
- Derek Jacobi as Sir Ralph Unwin
- Julian Barratt as Benjy Dhillon
- Karl Johnson as Bill Newman
- Ellie Haddington as Diane
- Paul Putner as Mick the Porter

== Production ==
The series is created and written by Penelope Skinner and Ginny Skinner. It was commissioned by the BBC in August 2020. Robbie McKillop and Nicole Charles both direct episodes of the series. It is produced by BBC Studios with Sister. Georgie Fallon is a producer on the project. The series is executive produced by Naomi de Pear, Lydia Hampson, Alice Tyler, Penelope Skinner, Ginny Skinner, and Jo McClellan.

=== Casting ===
In April 2022, Marianne Jean-Baptiste, Alistair Petrie and Rebekah Staton were confirmed as the lead roles in the series.

=== Filming ===
Filming took place in St Aldate's in Oxford in April 2022.

== Broadcast ==
The series was included in the list of BBC One scheduled dramas for the end of 2023 and first aired on 29 August 2023.

== Awards ==
The soundtrack won Arthur Sharpe an Ivor Novello Award for Best Television Soundtrack on Thursday 23 May 2024.
