= Blue Iguana (2018 film) =

2018 film by Hadi Hajaig

- Theatrical release poster
- Directed by: Hadi Hajaig
- Written by: Hadi Hajaig
- Produced by: Hadi Hajaig; Tom Lassally
- Starring: Sam Rockwell; Danny Granger; Ben Schwartz; Peter Ferdinando; Simon Callow; Al Weaver; Frances Barber; Vic Waghorn
- Cinematography: Ian Howes
- Edited by: Pierre Haberer; Hadi Hajaig
- Music by: Simon Lambros
- Production company: UK Film Studio Productions
- Distributed by: Signature Entertainment
- Release date: 24 August 2018 (United States)
- Running time: 100 minutes
- Country: United Kingdom
- Language: English
- Box office: $41,050

Blue Iguana is a 2018 British romantic comedy thriller film written and directed by Hadi Hajaig. The film stars Sam Rockwell, Phoebe Fox, Danny Granger, Ben Schwartz, Peter Ferdinando, Simon Callow, Al Weaver, Robin Hellier, and Frances Barber.

The film was released theatrically in the United States on 24 August 2018.

== Plot ==
Eddie (Sam Rockwell) and Paul (Ben Schwartz) are a couple of low-level petty criminals, who are working out their parole in a New York diner. Enter British lawyer Katherine (Phoebe Fox), who offers them ready cash to come to London and intercept a valuable package in transit. The duo arrives in London, team up with their British confederate Tommy Tresham (Al Weaver) and snatch the bag in the main hall of the Natural History Museum. This puts them on the wrong side of psychotic local villain Deacon Bradshaw (Peter Ferdinando) and his boss Arkardy (Peter Polycarpou). They learn that Arkady and Bradshaw are planning to steal a fabulous gem called the Blue Iguana and decide to stake out Bradshaw's pub in a bid to nab the gem for themselves.

== Cast ==
- Sam Rockwell as Eddie
- Ben Schwartz as Paul Driggs
- Phoebe Fox as Katherine Rookwood
- Amanda Donohoe as Dawn Bradshaw
- Simon Callow as Uncle Martin
- Peter Ferdinando as Deacon Bradshaw
- Al Weaver as Tommy Tresham
- Peter Polycarpou as Arkady
- Frances Barber as Princess
- Danny Granger as Stephane
- Vic Waghorn as Micky Oyl

== Production ==
Hajaig has stated that the film is his homage to American indie movies of the 1980s:

I wanted to make something with a playful spirit, a film that was fun with a left of field romance that avoided formal conventions, that moved and was resolved in progressively sillier and stranger ways - something with the same fun vibe as the films I watched in the late 1980s on VHS. Movies like the Jonathan Demme gem Something Wild, Jim McBride’s version of Breathless, and the Alec Baldwin film Miami Blues. All happen to be some of the most memorable movies of my youth. These were the films I first picked up and loved in the late 80s. They were different, funny, quirky and they didn't take themselves too seriously but most importantly they didn’t confine themselves to genre rules. They were wilfully and consciously haphazard and I loved them for it. So playing with genre conventions is key in BLUE IGUANA, playing with standard plot progression, who is the protagonist, is it Katherine or Eddie and what defined genre is this, if any? Then I had a blast with recurring themes of maleness, emasculation, which I hope are comedic.

The film was shot in London. One large sequence was shot in the main hall of London's Natural History Museum. The 35 mm format 4k Arriflex Amira camera was chosen, as its adaptability served the indie look the film makers strove to achieve. Director of photography Ian Howes worked to ensure the film maintained a filmic and analogue styling to reference American indie films of the 1980s. Londoner Peter Ferdinando maintained Deacon Bradshaw's South Yorkshire accent on and off the set throughout the shoot. Sam Rockwell's attempt at a Cockney accent is a key running gag.

== Reception ==
On the review aggregator website Rotten Tomatoes, 38% of 29 critics' reviews are positive, with an average rating of 4.6/10. The website's consensus reads: "This contrived heist film strikes gold with Sam Rockwell, but there isn't much else going for Blue Iguana."
