= The Boat That Rocked =

2009 film by Richard Curtis

- Theatrical poster
- Directed by: Richard Curtis
- Written by: Richard Curtis
- Produced by: Tim Bevan; Eric Fellner; Hilary Bevan Jones
- Starring: Philip Seymour Hoffman; Bill Nighy; Rhys Ifans; Nick Frost; Kenneth Branagh
- Cinematography: Danny Cohen
- Edited by: Emma E. Hickox
- Production companies: StudioCanal; Working Title Films
- Distributed by: Universal Pictures (International); StudioCanal (France); Focus Features (North America)
- Release dates: 1 April 2009 (UK); 16 April 2009 (Germany); 6 May 2009 (France); 13 November 2009 (US)
- Running time: 135 minutes
- Countries: United Kingdom; United States; Germany; France
- Language: English
- Budget: US$50 million
- Box office: US$36.3 million

The Boat That Rocked (titled Pirate Radio in North America) is a 2009 comedy-drama written and directed by Richard Curtis about pirate radio in the United Kingdom during the 1960s. The film has an ensemble cast consisting of Philip Seymour Hoffman, Bill Nighy, Rhys Ifans, Nick Frost and Kenneth Branagh. Set in 1966, it tells the story of the fictional pirate radio station "Radio Rock" and its crew of eclectic disc jockeys, who broadcast rock and pop music to the United Kingdom from a ship anchored in the North Sea while the British government tries to shut them down. It was produced by Working Title Films for Universal Pictures and was filmed on the Isle of Portland and at Shepperton Studios.

After the world premiere in Leicester Square on 23 March 2009, the film was released theatrically in the United Kingdom and Ireland on 1 April 2009. It was a commercial failure at the British box office making only US$10.1 million in its first three months, just a fifth of its US$50 million production cost. It received mixed reviews and criticism for its length. For its North American release, the film was cut by 20 minutes and retitled Pirate Radio. Opening on 13 November 2009, its worldwide cinema run finished in January 2010; the film had grossed US$36.6 million.

== Plot ==
In 1966, various pirate radio stations broadcast to the United Kingdom from ships in international waters, specialising in rock and pop music not played on BBC Radio. Seventeen-year-old Carl, recently expelled from school, is sent to stay with his godfather Quentin, who runs the station Radio Rock anchored in the North Sea. The eclectic crew of disc jockeys and staffers, led by brash American DJ "The Count" and DJ "Doctor Dave".

In London, government minister Sir Alistair Dormandy resolves to shut down pirate radio stations for their commercialism and immorality, instructing his subordinate Twatt to pursue legal stratagems to accomplish this. They attempt to cut off the pirates' revenue by prohibiting British businesses from advertising on unlicensed stations. Quentin counters by bringing massively popular DJ Gavin Kavanagh out of retirement on Radio Rock, enticing advertisers to pay their bills from abroad. Gavin's popularity creates a rivalry with The Count.

Carl becomes smitten with Quentin's niece Marianne, but is heartbroken when she is seduced by Doctor Dave, while DJ "Simple" Simon Swafford marries glamorous fan Elenore in an onboard ceremony, but learns that she only married him to be near Gavin. The Count challenges Gavin to a game of chicken in defence of Simon's honour: The stubborn rivals climb the ship's radio mast to a dangerous height, but reconcile after they are both injured jumping into the ocean.

Shortly after, Carl's mother Charlotte visits for Christmas, and denies that Quentin is his father. Carl gives her a cryptic message from reclusive late-night DJ "Smooth" Bob Silver, unexpectedly revealing that Bob is his father.

Marianne arrives to apologise to Carl for sleeping with Dave, and she and Carl have sex. The following morning, the DJs announce news of the coupling to cheering fans across Britain.

Meanwhile, Dormandy's vendetta against pirate radio advances when Twatt finds news of a fishing boat whose distress call was blocked by Radio Rock's powerful signal. Twatt proposes the creation of the Marine, &c., Broadcasting (Offences) Act 1967, making pirate radio stations illegal on the grounds that they endanger communication with other vessels. Despite heavy public support for the pirate stations, the act passes unanimously through Parliament and takes effect at midnight on 15 August 1967.

The Radio Rock crew defy the law and continue broadcasting, firing up the ship's engine to evade arrest. The aging vessel's engine explodes, and the ship sinks. The DJs broadcast their position in hope of aid, and Twatt appeals to Dormandy to send rescue boats, but Dormandy refuses. Carl saves the oblivious Bob from his cabin while The Count vows to broadcast as long as possible.

With the lifeboats inoperable, the crew gather on the prow as the ship goes down. They are rescued by dozens of fans in a fleet of small boats, with Carl being saved by Marianne. The Radio Rock ship disappears beneath the sea, with the Count emerging at the last moment.

== Cast ==
- Philip Seymour Hoffman as "The Count", the brash American DJ on Radio Rock, loosely based on Emperor Rosko, DJ on pirate Radio Caroline in 1966.
- Tom Sturridge as "Young" Carl, who is sent to stay with his godfather Quentin on the Radio Rock ship.
- Bill Nighy as Quentin, Carl's godfather, who runs Radio Rock.
- Will Adamsdale as "News" John Mayford, the station's news and weather reporter.
- Rhys Ifans as Gavin Kavanagh, a massively popular DJ brought out of retirement by Quentin, leading to a professional rivalry with The Count.
- Nick Frost as DJ "Doctor" Dave, a promiscuous man and member of the Radio Rock staff.
- Tom Brooke as "Thick" Kevin, Carl's intellectually dense cabin-mate and member of the Radio Rock staff.
- Rhys Darby as Angus "The Nut" Nutsford, DJ and lone New Zealander on the ship.
- Katherine Parkinson as Felicity, the lesbian cook and the only single woman permitted to live on the ship.
- Chris O'Dowd as "Simple" Simon Swafford, Radio Rock's breakfast DJ. O'Dowd drew inspiration from Tony Blackburn, the morning DJ on Radio Caroline in the 1960s, and his Irish contemporary Larry Gogan.
- Tom Wisdom as "Midnight" Mark, Radio Rock's suave night time DJ who rarely speaks but has female listeners swooning over him; he is known as "The Sexiest Man on the Planet".
- Ralph Brown as "Smooth" Bob Silver, "The Dawn Treader" (3, 6 a.m. shift), Radio Rock's reclusive early-morn DJ. Partially based on both John Peel who had the late-night shift "The Perfumed Garden" on pirate radio ship Radio London and longtime radio/TV music host Bob Harris, known as "Whispering Bob".
- Ike Hamilton as Harold, the station's radio assistant.
- Kenneth Branagh as Sir Alistair Dormandy, a strict government minister who endeavours to shut down pirate radio stations. Portrayed as a Conservative, but based on Labour Postmaster General Tony Benn.
- Sinead Matthews as Miss C (aka Miss Clitt, as revealed in the DVD deleted scenes), Dormandy's assistant who secretly listens to Radio Rock.
- Jack Davenport as Domenic Twatt, Dormandy's subordinate who is assigned the task of finding legal loopholes that can be used to shut down pirate radio stations.
- Talulah Riley as Marianne, Quentin's niece (and a fan of Dave) with whom Carl falls instantly in love.
- Emma Thompson as Charlotte, Carl's mother.
- January Jones as Elenore, a fan who marries Simon so that she can live on the ship and carry on a sexual relationship with Gavin.
- Olegar Fedoro as the Radio Rock ship's captain.
- Gemma Arterton as Desiree, a female fan.

Additional minor roles were played by Ian Mercer as the transfer boatman, Stephen Moore as the Prime Minister, Michael Thomas and Bohdan Poraj as Dormandy's subordinates Sandford and Fredericks, and Olivia Llewellyn as Marianne's friend Margaret and Felicity's love interest. Giovanna Fletcher plays one of the bridesmaids to Elenore.

== Production ==
=== Development ===
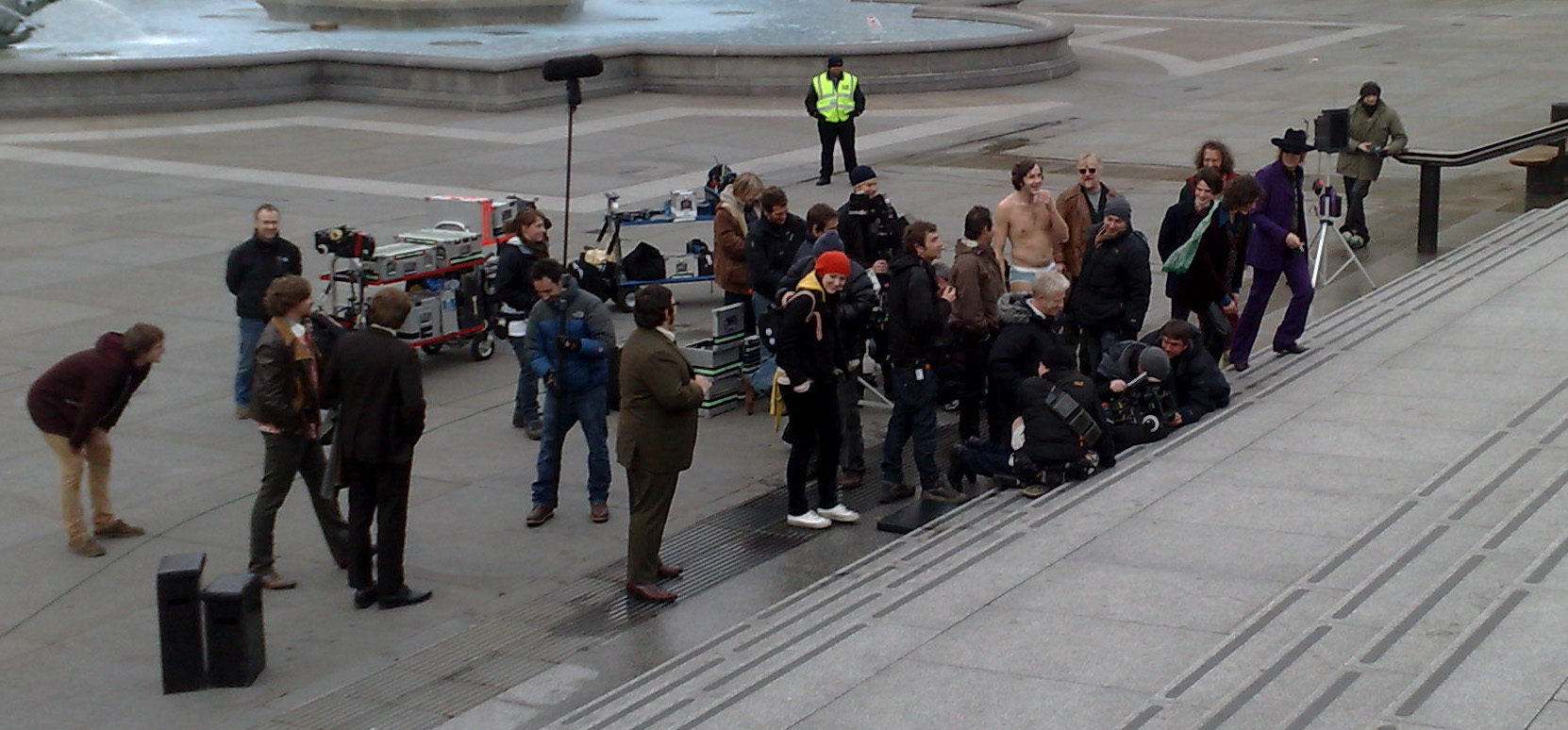
Principal photography taking place on the steps of the National Gallery in Trafalgar Square

The film was written and directed by Richard Curtis and made by Working Title Films for Universal Studios. The producers for Working Title were Tim Bevan, Eric Fellner and Hilary Bevan Jones, with Curtis, Debra Hayward and Liza Chasin acting as executive producers. Principal photography started on 3 March and continued until June 2008. Filming took place on the former Dutch hospital ship Timor Challenger, previously De Hoop, moored in Portland Harbour, Dorset; the "North Sea" scenes were shot off the coast of Dunbar, East Lothian. Boat interior shots were filmed inside a warehouse in Osprey Quay on the Isle of Portland and at Shepperton Studios. They also visited Squerryes Court in Kent to shoot the scenes of the home of government minister Alistair Dormandy (Kenneth Branagh). The film's production cost exceeded £30 million. It was also filmed on HMS Victory.

=== Historical setting ===
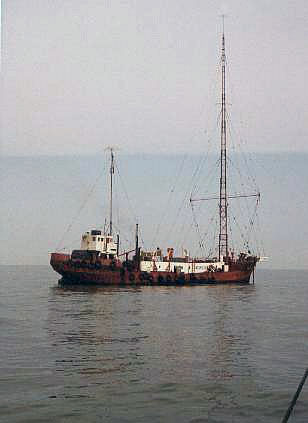
The MV Mi Amigo, c. 1974, which was the home of Radio Caroline South from 1964 to 1968

The official synopsis of The Boat That Rocked before release stated that it tells the fictional story about a group of DJs in 1966 who are at odds with a traditionalist British government that prefers to broadcast jazz. According to director Richard Curtis, the film, though inspired by real British pirate radio of the 1960s, is a work of historical fiction and does not depict a specific radio station of the period.

== Release ==
=== North American release ===
Following the film's commercial failure at the British box office, Focus Features commissioned a re-edited version for release in North American release 13 November 2009. Retitled Pirate Radio, this version of the film deleted approximately twenty minutes of footage from the original version to address complaints from several critics that the film's running time was excessive. Upon the release of Pirate Radio in the United States, Manohla Dargis wrote:

Stuffed with playful character actors and carpeted with wall-to-wall tunes, the film makes for easy viewing and easier listening, even if Mr. Curtis, who wrote and directed, has nothing really to say about these rebels for whom rock 'n' roll was both life's rhyme and its reason.

Robert Wilonsky, reviewing Pirate Radio after having seen The Boat That Rocked and its UK home video release, said the U.S. theatrical release had had "most of its better bits excised"; according to Wilonsky, "after watching the DVD, Pirate Radio feels so slight in its current incarnation. Shorn of the scenes that actually put meat on its characters' frail bones, the resulting product is vaguely cute and wholly insubstantial, little more than a randomly assembled hodge-podge of scenes crammed in and yanked out that amount to yet another movie about rebellious young men sticking it to The Grumpy Old Man—this time, with a tacked-on Titanic climax." The marketing campaign for the film's North American release was notable for embellishing the nature of the movie, as well as the historical setting. Trailers had a prominent voice-over announcement stating that "in 1966 the British government banned rock 'n' roll on the radio. Until one American DJ and a band of renegades launched a radio station on the high seas and raided the air waves." In the film, pirate radio transmissions were widespread before Parliament passed the Marine, &c., Broadcasting (Offences) Act 1967, including the station portrayed on the film.

The trailer in North America also featured dialog from a scene not in the release; chief among which were a British government minister was being told in a voiceover that the American deejay "The Count" is "possibly the most famous broadcaster ever," which was not borne by the actual plot. The trailer and commercials also displayed prominent text that stated "inspired by a true story," which was not claimed by either the production or writing staff.

== Reception ==
The film received mixed reviews. Rotten Tomatoes gave it a score of 59% based on 167 reviews. The Daily Telegraph credited the film with "some magical moments," but called it "muddled" and criticised its length. Time Out was also critical of the length and said the film was "disappointing." The Hollywood Reporter ran the headline "Rock 'n' roll movie Boat just barely stays afloat," declaring the film too long to sustain interest. Total Film also criticised the film's length and comedic style. Andrew Neil, writing in The Observer, remarked that he was disappointed in the "contrived" storyline and the "unnecessarily perverted" history. Channel 4 said the film was "touching," "heartfelt" and an "enjoyable journey" but questioned its coherence.

The film's British box office revenues in its first 12 weeks of release were £6.1 million, less than a quarter of its production cost.

In United States, the film earned less than US$3 million in its first weekend (in a mid-scale release of 882 screens as opposed to 3,404 screens for 2012 and 3,683 screens for A Christmas Carol) and suffered a 49.7% drop-off on its second weekend, earning only US$1.46 million. The film took about US$8 million (approximately £5 million) in North America.

== Soundtrack ==
- The soundtrack features songs from the Kinks, the Rolling Stones, the Turtles, Jimi Hendrix, Duffy, Procol Harum, Box Tops, the Beach Boys, Dusty Springfield, the Seekers and the Who.
- The soundtrack features 32 songs on two discs. The film itself has a 60-song playlist.

== Home media ==
Scenes cut from the film but available in at least some of the film's home media releases include:

- A long scene of late-night sabotage aboard a competitor's vessel. This scene was filmed aboard former Trinity House lightship LV18.
- The Count's homage to the Beatles, delivered in front of Abbey Road studios;
- Gavin Kavanagh in a flashback, dancing in a Latin American bar to "Get Off of My Cloud";
- A heartbroken "Simple" Simon lip syncs Lorraine Ellison's "Stay with Me" in its entirety.
- Midnight Mark "entertains" about 30 naked women who are part of a large group of fans that visit the ship.

Format	Release date	Additional content
DVD	Region 1: 13 April 2010; Region 2: 7 September 2009; Region 4: 12 August 2009	Deleted scenes, director's commentary
Blu-ray	Region 1: 13 April 2010; Region 2: 7 September 2009; Region 4: 12 August 2009	Deleted scenes, director's commentary

== See also ==
- Marine, &c., Broadcasting (Offences) Act 1967
- Wireless Telegraphy Acts
