= Rebekah Staton =

English actress and narrator

- Born: Leek, Staffordshire, England
- Occupations: Actress; narrator
- Years active: 2003–present

Rebekah Staton is an English actress and narrator. She has had roles in Pulling (2006–2009), Doctor Who (2007), Rome (2007), Wallander (2011), Black Mirror (2011), Raised by Wolves (2013–2016), DanTDM Creates a Big Scene (2017), and Home (2019–2020). She was also a narrator for Don't Tell The Bride (2008–2020).

== Early life and education ==
Rebekah Staton was born in Leek, Staffordshire. Her family moved to Shrewsbury, and, when she was nine, to Penkridge, Staffordshire.

She was a student at Wolgarston High School in Penkridge, and went on to study acting at the Royal Academy of Dramatic Art (RADA), graduating with a BA in Acting (H Level) in 2002.

== Career ==
Staton's theatre work includes Playing with Fire by David Edgar at the National Theatre. The Crucible at the Crucible Theatre, Simplicity and Chasing the Golden Sun at the Orange Tree Theatre.

In 2007, she played Jenny/Mother of "the Family" in the Doctor Who two-part "Human Nature"/"The Family of Blood", alongside David Tennant and Freema Agyeman. The same year, she starred as Althea in two episodes in the series Rome (2007). She played Louise in the BBC Three award-winning sitcom Pulling. She also plays Kristina in the BBC One version of Wallander (2011).

Other appearances include two episodes of The Amazing Mrs Pritchard, six of State of Play, and the film Bright Young Things. She had a small part in the 2006 mini series Jane Eyre. She plays the character of the superhero "She-Force" in the 2008 ITV2 series No Heroics, and played the character of Kelly in the BBC comedy Home Time.

In 2011, she acted as Caitlin in the Sky1 comedy series Spy.

In 2011, she appeared in "The Entire History of You", an episode of the anthology series Black Mirror.

From 2013 until 2016, Staton played Della in the Channel 4 sitcom Raised by Wolves, a performance described as "utterly brilliant".

In 2016, Staton was cast in the second series of Ordinary Lies as Wendy Walker. Filming started in March 2016.

Staton was the narrator for the BBC Three and BBC America documentary 18 Pregnant Schoolgirls, as well as being the narrator for the E4 reality television series Don't Tell the Bride. She also voices Bethany in Dragon Age II, and provided the voiceover for the Channel 5 documentary series Candy Bar Girls.

Staton played Katy in Home from 2019 to 2020.

In 2023 Staton played Alice Newman, a lead role opposite Marianne Jean-Baptiste, in the BBC thriller series The Following Events Are Based on a Pack of Lies.

== Recognition and honours ==
In July 2025, Staton received an honorary degree from Keele University.

== Filmography ==
=== Television ===
Year(s)	Title	Role	Notes
2003	State of Play	Liz	
2004	Outlaws	Janey	
2006	Jane Eyre	Bessie	
2007	Rome	Althea	Episodes: "These Being the Words of Marcus Tullius Cicero", "Testudo et Lepus"
2007	Doctor Who	Jenny	Episodes: "Human Nature" / "The Family of Blood"
2006–2009	Pulling	Louise	
2008–2012	Wallander		Episodes: "Before the Frost", "The Dogs of Riga", "An Event in Autumn"
2008	No Heroics	Jenny / "She-Force"	
2011	Black Mirror	Colleen	Episode: "The Entire History of You"
2011–2012	Spy	Caitlin Banks	
2012	Hunderby	Annie	
2012	Inside Men	Sandra	
2012	Groove High	Vic	
2013	Love Matters	Jenny	
2013	Great Night Out	Kath	
2013	Moving On	Lisa	
2013–2016	Raised by Wolves	Della Garry	
2014	Up the Women	Betty	
2014	Remember Me	Alison Denning	
2016	Ordinary Lies	Wendy Walker	
2017	DanTDM Creates a Big Scene	Ellie	
2019–2020	Home	Katy	
2023	The Following Events Are Based on a Pack of Lies	Alice	
2024	Bad Tidings	Stacey Brennan	
2026	Criminal Record	Ashley Jones	

=== Movies ===
- Will (2011)
- The Hustle (2019) as Chloe, a pub girl
