= Campus (TV series) =

2011 British television series

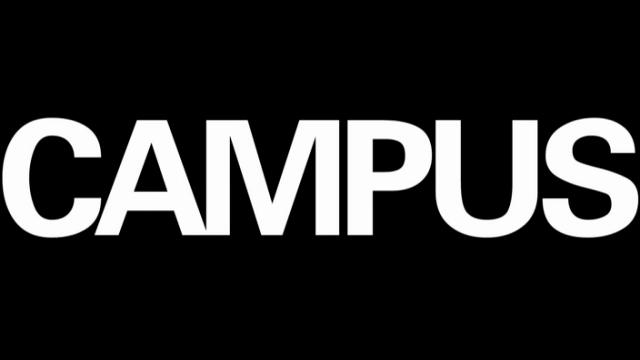
- Genre: Sitcom
- Written by: Robert Harley; James Henry; Oriane Messina; Gary Parker; Victoria Pile; Richard Preddy; Fay Rusling; Christian Sandino-Taylor
- Directed by: Victoria Pile
- Starring: Andy Nyman; Joseph Millson; Sara Pascoe; Will Adamsdale; Dolly Wells; Lisa Jackson; Jonathan Bailey; Katherine Ryan; Alison Lintott; Chizzy Akudolu; Matthew Devitt
- Theme music composer: Trellis
- Country of origin: United Kingdom
- Original language: English
- No. of series: 1
- No. of episodes: 6

Production
- Executive producer: Caroline Leddy
- Producer: Victoria Pile
- Editor: Christian Sandino-Taylor
- Running time: 50 minutes; 25 minutes (pilot)
- Production company: Monicker Pictures

Original release
- Network: Channel 4
- Release: 5 April – 10 May 2011

Related
- Green Wing

Campus is a semi-improvised British television sitcom. It was created by the team behind the sketch show Smack the Pony and hospital-based sitcom Green Wing, led by Victoria Pile who acts as co-writer, producer and director. It is set in the fictitious Kirke University and follows the lives of the staff, in particular the power-crazed and callous vice chancellor Jonty de Wolfe (played by Andy Nyman), lazy womanising English literature professor Matt Beer (Joseph Millson) and newly promoted senior mathematics lecturer Imogen Moffat (Lisa Jackson).

Campus was first broadcast as a television pilot on Channel 4 on 6 November 2009, as part of the channel's Comedy Showcase season of comedy pilots. A full series was later commissioned and commenced airing on 5 April 2011, with the first episode being a re-shot and expanded version of the pilot. When first broadcast many critics claimed it was too similar to Green Wing and that much of the humour was offensive. However, others praised the show's dark humour and surrealism. Campus was cancelled after one series due to poor TV ratings. Over the course of the first series (not including the pilot) the average ratings were 554,000 viewers per episode, or 2.99% of the total audience, which is below the Channel 4 average.

== Plot ==
Campus revolves around the lives of the staff of Kirke University, a plate glass university under the control of Vice Chancellor Jonty de Wolfe (Nyman). Wolfe is described as "a comedy grotesque", who wants Kirke and himself to become greater, no matter how it is done. He often gives out what he sees as the harsh truth to people but what others consider to be offensive and even bigoted remarks. He is assisted by the "Three Graces of Admin", three administrators all of whom are called Grace and are referred to as Grace 1, Grace 2 and Grace 3 or "Big Grace", "Pretty Grace" and "Was Once A Man Grace" (Alison Lintott, Chizzy Akudolu and Matthew Devitt respectively).

One of Wolfe's plans is to exploit the success of newly promoted senior maths lecturer Imogen Moffat (Jackson) and her hit book The Joy of Zero, by ordering her to write a sequel and the other university staff also to write best selling books. His targets include English literature professor Matt Beer (Millson), an unrepentant womaniser, who does hardly any work and who is assisted by postgraduate student Flatpack (Jonathan Bailey), a man who reads hardly any books and instead is keen on sport. Beer tries to come up with ideas but spends more time annoying Moffat and mechanical engineering lecturer Lydia Tennant (Dolly Wells), who is annoyed by Moffat's success.

Elsewhere in the university, Nicole Huggins (Sara Pascoe), an accommodations officer, makes an error in the university's accounting system. As a result, everyone in the university has received twice as much pay as normal, giving away over £2 million. It is left to university accountant Jason Armitage (Will Adamsdale) to try to retrieve the money but he fails. The university is forced to call in Canadian restructuring guru Georgina "George" Bryan (Katherine Ryan). Due to her fondness for downsizing, Wolfe orders for Beer to seduce her in order to make her cuts less damaging.

While Beer tries to carry out Wolfe's orders, he begins to develop feelings for Moffat and starts to suspect that he is falling in love with her. As he tries to reveal his feelings to Moffat, Bryan accepts Beer's offer of sex. In revenge Moffat has sex with Flatpack, who in turn begins to fall in love with Moffat. Meanwhile, Huggins attempts to make Armitage fall in love with her but when Armitage reveals that he is already in a relationship with Cecilia Hare (who does not appear in on screen), Huggins claims that she is a lesbian so that they can still be friends.

By the end of the series, it emerges that Bryan's one night stand with Beer has left her pregnant. At the meeting in which she is due to publish her damaging final report on the university, her pregnancy causes her to re-evaluate her priorities, realising that destroying the lives and careers of the staff would be cruel. Wolfe persuades her to modify her report to put Kirke in a better light and offers her a job at the same time. The series ends without resolving the relationships between Beer and Moffat or Armitage and Huggins, who eventually sleep together in the final episode, with Huggins claiming that Armitage "turned" her heterosexual rather than reveal the fact that she lied.

== Production ==
Campus shares connections with an earlier Channel 4 sitcom Green Wing. It has six of the same writers: Victoria Pile, Robert Harley, James Henry, Oriane Messina, Richard Preddy and Fay Rusling. It also has the same composer, Jonathan Whitehead. Campus references Green Wing in the show, with the motto of Kirke University being: "With wings." Filming for the series took place during the summer months of 2010, at the University of Bath campus, with some additional internal shots being filmed at Buckinghamshire New University in High Wycombe.

Campus was created by Pile, who also acted as producer and director. She set up the stories, ideas and characters. Once enough material was created, the actors were brought along to read the scripts with the other writers. Millson claimed that the eight writers went off and wrote their own version of the show, and then all the versions were read. Pile claims that she decided to set the show at a university because they display various kinds of relationships, similar to the hospital setting of Green Wing.

=== Character development ===
Jonty de Wolfe is described as a "pseudo-magic figure" by co-writer and editor Christian Sandino-Taylor. Nyman says that in his world, "you are never quite sure whether that's actually him doing stuff or just his madness... he's clearly potty." Nyman was responsible for Wolfe's appearance, including his quiff hairstyle, and also Wolfe's use of other voices, which he has since gone to claim as being a form of multiple personality disorder. He also claims that Wolfe thinks he is sane, but is actually insane. Pile said of the character: "We've all had bosses that are power hungry and status obsessed and it's a kind of extension of what we all know and recognise in our fellow human beings, and sometimes in ourselves."

With regards to other characters, Messina describes Jason Armitage as being "awkward" and finding every situation difficult. Millson describes the relationship between Beer and Moffat as being similar to Benedick and Beatrice in Much Ado About Nothing. Wells claims that Tennant, "has got to the point now where she'd be grateful for anything... but she would prefer a man". Ryan describes Bryan as being the show's villain.

The characters Flatpack, Grace 2 and Grace 3 were not in the pilot and were later additions. Bailey describes the relationship between Flatpack and Beer as a, "one-sided unrequited beautiful love." Bailey also claims that he is an "open book" due to his simpleness.

== Episodes ==
=== Pilot (2009) ===
Title	Original release date	UK viewers (millions)
"Comedy Showcase: Campus"	6 November 2009	0.9
Jonty de Wolf, vice chancellor of Kirke University, decides that in order to increase the profile of the university more of his lecturers should be writing best selling books, following the example of the newly promoted senior lecturer in mathematics Imogen Moffet. He therefore orders lazy English literature professor Matt Beer to write a book. Elsewhere, accountant Jason Armitage has to get back over £800,000 of university money after an error results in the university staff being paid twice.

=== Series 1 (2011) ===
No.	Title	Original release date	UK viewers (millions)
1	"Publication, Publication, Publication"	5 April 2011	0.61
The first episode has the same plot as the pilot. The episode however is expanded to run to 70 minutes (including adverts) instead of 40 minutes.
2	"The Culling Fields"	12 April 2011	0.54
Jonty is forced to make huge spending cuts and the Kirke University rumour mill goes into paranoid overdrive.
3	"Hurricane George (Note: This episode is also known under the title of "Dark Canadian Fog".)"	19 April 2011	0.38
A Canadian restructuring guru, George Bryan, is called in to solve Kirke money worries. However, as she is keen on downsizing everything everyone worries about their jobs. Jonty decides to use Matt to seduce her.
4	"Come Together"	26 April 2011	0.43
Matt continues his attempt to seduce George, Flatpack tries some wooing on his own, and Jason begins to develop feelings for Nicole.
5	"Post-Coital"	3 May 2011	0.44
Matt begins to worry about his actual feelings for a colleague and Imogen panics over an ill-advised coupling.
6	"The Final Preliminary Report of Doom (Note: This episode is also known under the title of "An Ending and a Beginning and an Ending".)"	10 May 2011	0.36
George delivers her final report, but the bad news is not what everyone is expecting, leaving Kirke's staff with even more complicated problems to solve.

== Reception ==
=== Pilot ===
The main characters in Campus. Top row, left-to-right, Flatpack (Bailey), Lydia Tennant (Wells), Imogen Moffat (Jackson), Nicole Huggins (Pascoe) and Jason Armitage (Adamsdale); Bottom row, left-to-right, Matt Beer (Millson), Jonty de Wolfe (Nyman) and George Bryan (Ryan).

The pilot received a mixed reception when it was broadcast. Jane Simon in the Daily Mirror wrote that: "There are some very funny moments but the staff at Kirke are perhaps a little too eccentric for their own good. It's as if the challenge was how weird can we make these people and still have them breathe oxygen? Vice-chancellor Jonty (Andy Nyman) comes on like a more megalomaniac David Brent, while womanising English lecturer Matt Beer (think about it) and speccy maths star Imogen Moffat (Joseph Millson and Lisa Jackson) have big shoes to fill if they're to be Campus's answer to Guy [Secretan] and Caroline [Todd, characters from Green Wing]."

Sam Wollaston of The Guardian disliked Campus, saying: "Ah, I see, Campus (Channel 4) is taking that path: the offensive one. There's nothing wrong with that; offence can be good, if done artfully. There's plenty of it here – Jonty's bigotry and English literature lecturer Matt Beer's (comedy name, like beer mat, but the other way round!) sex pesting. There is talk of rape by pigs, and odd-shaped anal cavities that lead to odd-shaped stools. I'm just not convinced it is being done very artfully. It seems more like offence for the sake of offence. Compare it with the beautifully crafted filth of Malcolm Tucker in The Thick of It. If he is the Michelangelo of offence, this is Rolf Harris."

However, Caitlin Moran of The Times praised it saying she hoped a full series would be made. She wrote of the pilot: "Although, like Green Wing, Campus works as an ensemble of freaks, perhaps the most intriguing mutant is Vice Chancellor Jonty de Wolfe (Andy Nyman). Initially, he looks like the weakest character – a small, bumptious David Brent clone who keeps attempting Jamaican patois to make a point. But by the end of the show he has turned into a more sinister version of the shopkeeper in Mr Benn – wandering around the library in a floor-length taffeta ballgown, urging depressed students to commit suicide and, on one occasion, simply disappearing in the middle of a monologue, as if it were a Las Vegas floor-show, leaving his English lecturer Matthew Beer (Joseph Millson) holding a madly clattering clockwork monkey, and his jaw."

=== Series 1 ===
The first series also had a mixed reaction. Tim Dowling in The Guardian wrote that: "The central problem with Campus is that the gossamer-thin thread that tethered Green Wing to a plot has here completely snapped. Everything is too surreal and unmoored. Vice-chancellor Jonty de Wolfe (Andy Nyman) is meant to be monstrously ambitious, but he's just monstrous. He's all over the place – shouting out the window, jumping out of cupboards, putting on accents and indulging in freeform sexist and/or racist rants. His character isn't identifiably pathetic, cynical, inadequate or insane; he isn't even a character, really."

Graeme Thomson wrote for The Arts Desk that, "Campus tilled familiar ground with diminishing returns and zero warmth", while Dan Owen for Obsessed With Film about Wolfe that: "He's David Brent meets Charles Manson. It's just a shame his performance is just one of many bonkers turns, because there's so much weirdness it almost becomes suffocating."

There were positive reviews of Campus. Rob Clyne wrote for Sabotage Times that: "The overall picture of Campus isn't yet a clear one. At times it feels a little like a few sketches have been slung together, especially as a lot of the Jonty stuff comes out of nowhere. But these are only small gripes – Campus is hugely original, some may say it is genre defining. It's not everyone's cup of tea, but this is pure entertainment which doesn't need to fall under a specific category."

Louisa Mellor from Den of Geek attacked some of the complaints against the show saying: "The complaint about implausibility in comedy always baffles me. No, you wouldn't meet people like these in real life. Yes, they are unrealistic. We are all talking about sitcom aren't we? Jonty, Matt, Lydia et al are comic creations, little grains of truth worked up into misshaped pearls of comedy weirdness. It might help to place it on the family tree of The Kids in the Hall, Big Train or (at a fairly hefty push) Monty Python, rather than as having descended from the much more straightforward worlds of The Royle Family or The Office."

On BBC Radio 4 Extra's comedy discussion show What's So Funny? host Rufus Hound and guest Dom Joly both enjoyed the show. Joly described the show as, "one of the funniest things I've seen in three or four years. It made me laugh so much, so quickly."

== Cancellation ==
Campus was cancelled in June 2011 after one series due to poor viewing figures. Following from the pilot which attracted 900,000 viewers (5% of the total viewing audience), the first episode of the first series attracted only 610,000 viewers (3.7%). The other episodes attracted 540,000 viewers (3.2%), 380,000 viewers (2.3%), 430,000 viewers (2.5%), 440,000 viewers (2.5%), and 360,000 viewers (2.1%) respectively. Over the course of the first series (not including the pilot) the average ratings for the series were 554,000 viewers (2.99%), below the Channel 4 average. A spokesman for Channel 4 said that, "C4 are very proud to have championed Campus and those fans who watched adored it, but there simply weren't enough of them to justify a second series."

After the series was cancelled, fans of the show complained to Channel 4. Out of 105 complaints that were sent to Channel 4 about Campus in June 2011, most of them complained about the programme's cancellation. It was the second most complained about programme on Channel 4 that month, after the documentary Sri Lanka's Killing Fields.

== Merchandise ==
A DVD of the first series was released on 16 May 2011. It features deleted scenes, a behind-the-scenes documentary, and a re-edited version of the ending to the series as extras. While the Comedy Showcase pilot version of the first episode has not yet been released on DVD, it is currently watchable available via Channel 4's on demand service 4oD and in August 2016 it was added to Netflix worldwide.
