= Paul Merton: The Series =

British television series (1991–1993)

- Starring: Paul Merton; John Irwin; Robert Harley; Nick Hancock
- Country of origin: United Kingdom
- Original language: English
- No. of series: 2
- No. of episodes: 12

Production
- Running time: 6x30 minutes 6x35 minutes
- Production company: Hat Trick Productions

Original release
- Network: Channel 4
- Release: 25 September 1991 – 8 October 1993

Paul Merton: The Series is a British sketch show that aired on Channel 4 from 1991 to 1993. The main star was Paul Merton, who co-wrote it along with John Irwin. It is available on DVD and every episode is available for viewing free via Channel 4 service All4. It can also be purchased in the UK via iTunes.

== Cast ==
- Paul Merton - Various
- John Irwin - Various
- Robert Harley - Various

Merton, Irwin and Harley were the main cast; however, each episode featured guest stars including Siobhan Hayes, Chris Lang, Ben Miller, Neil Mullarkey and Caroline Quentin, who was Merton's wife at the time.

== Broadcast details ==
Series one was broadcast between 25 September 1991 and 30 October 1991. Series two was broadcast between 3 September 1993 and 8 October 1993. Each episode in the first series was 30 minutes long, including adverts, while the second series episodes were 35 minutes including adverts.

Both series were produced by David Tyler
