= Jude Wright =

English actor (born 1999)

- Born: 14 November 1999 (age 26); London, England
- Occupation: Actor

Jude Wright (born 14 November 1999) is an English actor.

== Career ==
Wright is best known for his role as Marcus in the television series Spy, that ran from 2011 to 2012. Wright played Sam in the Channel 4 miniseries World Without End in 2012. He also starred in the HSBC British & Irish Lions advertisement for the 2013 Australia tour, as the cabin boy.

In 2013 Wright appeared in The Christmas Candle, and in 2014 he co-starred in Paddington, and also appeared in The Woman in Black: Angel of Death and Robot Overlords. In 2015 Wright appeared in Season 3 of BBC Worldwide's Da Vinci's Demons, where he played Leonardo da Vinci's son Andrea.

In 2011 he won the prize for the best performance in a TV film for his performance in Spy in the young actors category, awarded by TheSkyKid.com.
