= The Delivery Man (TV series) =

- Genre: Sitcom
- Created by: Victoria Pile & Robert Harley
- Written by: Robert Harley; James Henry
- Directed by: Victoria Pile
- Starring: Darren Boyd; Aisling Bea; Fay Ripley; Paddy McGuinness; Alex MacQueen; Llewella Gideon; Jennie Jacques
- Composers: Rob Jones; Joe da Costa
- Country of origin: United Kingdom
- Original language: English
- No. of series: 1
- No. of episodes: 6

Production
- Executive producer: Robert Harley
- Producer: Victoria Pile
- Production location: 3 Mills Studios
- Editor: Christian Sandino-Taylor
- Running time: 30 minutes (inc. adverts)
- Production company: Monicker Pictures

Original release
- Network: ITV
- Release: 15 April – 20 May 2015

The Delivery Man is a British sitcom shown on ITV for one series in 2015. The series stars Darren Boyd as Matthew Bunting, a former police constable starting a new career as a midwife. From August 2015 the series starting showing on Netflix in the UK, Ireland, United States, Canada, Australia and New Zealand.

== Production ==
A pilot episode was shot in February 2014. The first series was filmed between October and December 2014 at 3 Mills Studios.

== Cast and characters ==
- Darren Boyd as Matthew Bunting
- Aisling Bea as Lisa McGeoghan, junior midwife
- Joe da Costa as Ryan Sexington, Lisa's boyfriend
- Fay Ripley as Caitlin Tilby, senior midwife
- Paddy McGuinness as Ian Hanwell, police officer
- Alex Macqueen as Luke Edward, senior consultant obstetrician
- Llewella Gideon as Patricia Pattinson, senior midwife
- Jennie Jacques as Natasha Phipps (AKA "Tash"), junior midwife

== Episodes ==
No.	Title	Directed by	Written by	Original release date	Viewers (millions)
1	"Youth"	Victoria Pile	Robert Harley & James Henry	15 April 2015	3.2
A teenage dad tries to visit his pregnant girlfriend without her parents finding out his identity – new boy Matthew has to choose whose side to take. His whale music is not ideal and Pat reports him for abuse.
2	"Truth"	Victoria Pile	Robert Harley & James Henry	22 April 2015	2.0
A 'double dad' has to rush between the bedsides of two expectant mothers, while Matthew realises he's landed Lisa's boyfriend in trouble. Ian is suspended and asks Matthew to find him a job in the hospital.
3	"Prisoner"	Victoria Pile	Robert Harley & James Henry	29 April 2015	1.6
A female prisoner is on release while she gives birth, but the police want some crucial information from her and Ian tries some underhand interrogation tactics. A furious Ryan hears that Lisa has been lending Matthew money and turns up at the hospital in a rage.
4	"Celebrity"	Victoria Pie	Robert Harley & James Henry	6 May 2015	1.6
A reality TV star arrives incognito in an emergency and asks Matthew to hide her pregnancy from the public. Thanks to Tash's Facebook, word gets out - and the staff need to trick the paparazzi.
5	"Foundling"	Victoria Pie	Robert Harley & James Henry	13 May 2015	1.4
The midwife team finds an abandoned baby. They try to identify the mother before the authorities are called in.
6	"Theft"	Victoria Pie	Robert Harley & James Henry	20 May 2015	1.3
The drugs cupboard is raided and a forensic team is called in - one of whom is Matthew's very attractive ex, and is keen to get back together... Meanwhile, Ryan is back and Caitlin has a date.

== Reception ==
The Independent was moderately positive on the series, though found it lacking compared to Green Wing. The Telegraph dubbed the series punchy.
