= Polly Maberly =

English actress

- Born: 1976 (age 49–50); Reigate, Surrey, England
- Education: Royal Academy of Dramatic Art
- Occupation: Actress
- Spouse: Gerard Johnson
- Relatives: Kate Maberly (sister)

Polly Maberly (born 1976) is an English actress, known for playing Kitty Bennet in the BBC's 1995 adaptation of Pride and Prejudice. She is the older sister of actress Kate Maberly. She is married to director and writer Gerard Johnson.

== Film ==
- Odyssey as Natasha Flynn

== Television ==
- The Children of Green Knowe (Linnet Oldknow, 1986)
- 2point4 Children (TV series) (Jackie in "I'm Going Slightly Mad", 1992)
- Pride and Prejudice (miniseries) (Kitty Bennet, 1995)
- Midsomer Murders (TV series) (Julie Stockard in "Who Killed Cock Robin", 2001)
- The Bill (TV series) (Carol Lewis in 045, 2002)
- The Royal (Dr. Lucy Klein in Series 2 & 3, 2003)
- Harley Street (Kate Fielding, 2008)
- Doctors (Carol Bettany in "Eat for Two", 2008)
- Holby City (Molly Guillory in "Tough Love", 2009)
- Foyles War (Edith Milner Series 6 & 7, 2008 & 2010)
- Holby City (Georgia Staniford in 'Going, Going...', 2014)
- EastEnders (DI Ellie Kent, 2017–2018)
- Doctors (Charlotte Simms, 2022)

== Stage ==
- The 39 Steps (Pamela Arbroath) - Greece
- The Honest Whore (Belafront, leading lady)
- 'Cece, L'Uomo dal Fiore in Bocca (The Man With The Flower In His Mouth), "I'm Dreaming Or Am I?" (Nada, leading lady) a triple bill of plays by Luigi Pirandello - New End Theatre, London. 1999
- The Browning Version (play) (Mrs Gilbert) - Theatre Royal Bath. 2000
- The Tempest (Miranda') - Summer Shakespeare Festivities, Prague Castle/Spilberk Castle, Brno. 2000
- Under the Doctor (written by Peter Tilbury) - Churchill Theatre, Bromley/ Comedy Theatre, London. 2001
- When Harry Met Sally... (Helen). 2005
- Hedda Gabler (Thea Elvsted) - West Yorkshire Playhouse, Liverpool Playhouse. 2006
- Drowning on Dry Land (play) (Linzi Ellison, leading lady) Salisbury Playhouse. 2008
