= Cavan Clerkin =

British television actor and writer

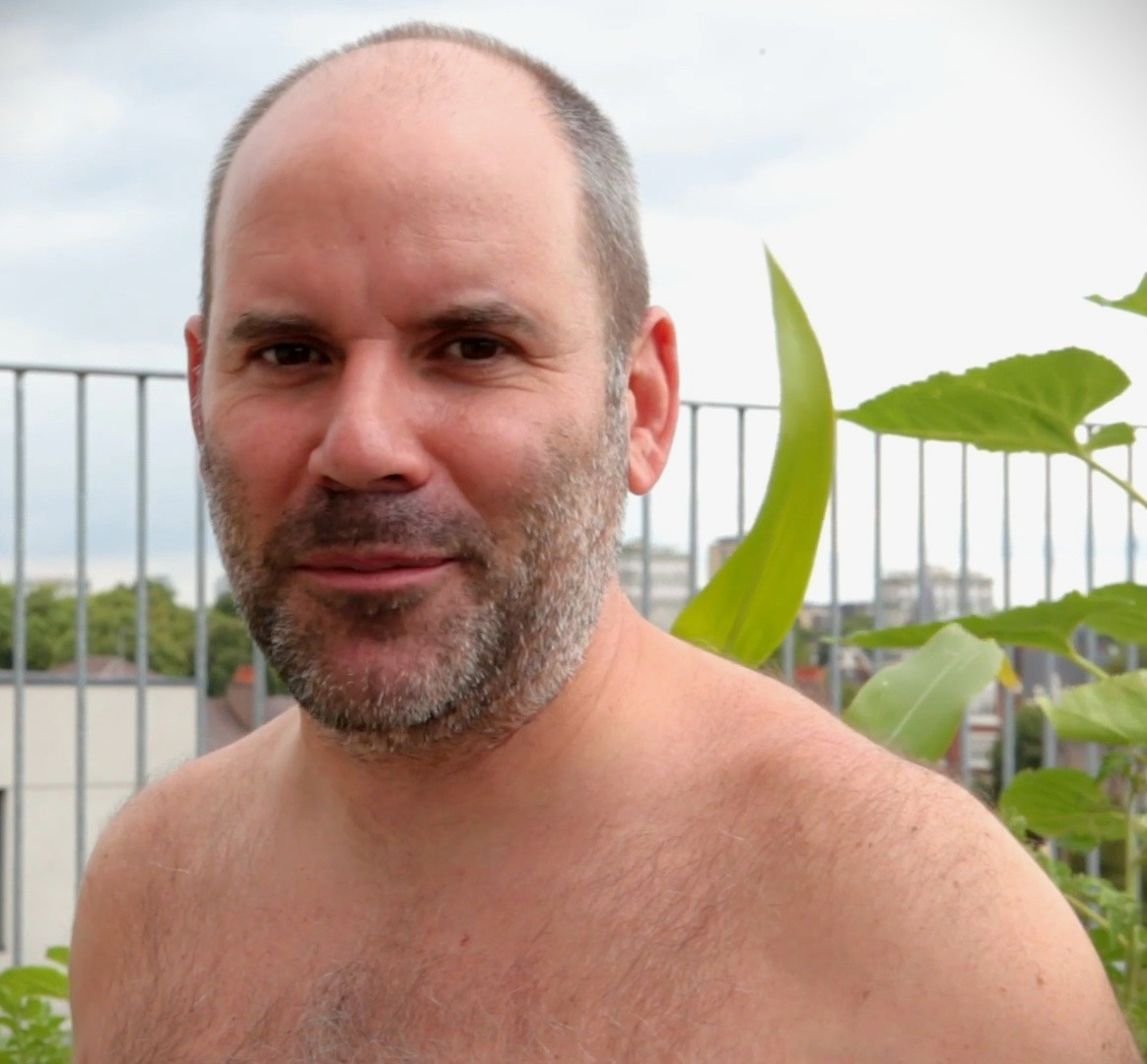
- Clerkin preparing to film Muscle, 2019
- Born: 1973 (age 52–53); London, England, UK
- Occupations: Actor, writer
- Years active: 1998–present

Cavan Clerkin (born 1973) is a British actor and filmmaker from Hackney, London. He is known for The Capture (2019–2022), The Last Kingdom (2017–2022), Muscle (2019) and BAFTA nominated comedy Pulling (2006). He wrote, produced and starred in feature film Nice Guy (2012) and has appeared in a wide range of British TV and film. He won Best Actor at Tallinn Black Nights 2019.

== Career ==
Clerkin has appeared in various TV shows including Smack the Pony, The Inbetweeners and The IT Crowd, and feature films Gangster No. 1, Pierrepoint, and Muscle. He co-wrote and starred in the comedy series Los Dos Bros (2002) with Darren Boyd. He played alongside Sharon Horgan in BAFTA nominated sitcom Pulling (2006–2009), and appeared in the soap opera EastEnders (2009) as Joel Reynolds. He played Leonard Glickman in TV thriller The Shadow Line (2011); and DCI Gerring in the ITV drama Lucan (2013). He wrote, produced and starred in the independent feature film Nice Guy (2012). He played Clarkey in the police satire Babylon (2014), directed by Danny Boyle, and appeared in the BBC sitcom Count Arthur Strong (2014). In 2016 he played Vinnie Mann, a talent manager in Morgana Robinson's The Agency. In 2020 he played Simon in Muscle. He plays Father Pyrlig in the Netflix drama The Last Kingdom (2017–2022) and Seven Kings Must Die (2023), and Detective Sergeant Flynn in the BBC surveillance thriller The Capture (2019–2022).

== Awards ==
Clerkin's co-created series Los Dos Bros won a Silver Rose at Montreux in 2002.

In 2019 he won Best Actor award at the Tallinn Black Nights Film Festival for his performance in Gerard Johnson's psychological thriller Muscle (2019).
