= Lisa Jackson (actress) =

English actress (born 1979)

Lisa Jackson (born 1 June 1979) is an English actress. She has played Alice Butler in Holby City, Ellie Thomas in Hoff the Record, Portia in Toast of London, Phyllis Stanwyck in Father Brown, Lady Lushingham in Mr Selfridge, Deborah in Panto!, Imogen Moffat in the Channel 4 Comedy Showcase sitcom Campus, Sandra in Mike Bartlett's Love, Love, Love, Janice Pearce in BBC Four's Dirk Gently and Joan Helford in Rupert Goold's production of Time and the Conways at the National Theatre. Earlier in her career she appeared in Stephen Fry's film Bright Young Things. She trained at LAMDA.

From 6 April to 25 June 2016 she appeared in The Suicide at the National Theatre, starring Javone Prince, directed by Nadia Fall.

== Filmography ==
Year	Title	Role	Notes
2001	Linda Green	Girl in Club	Episode: "Lesbians"
2002	Daniel Deronda	Mab Meyrick	3 episodes
2002	A Small Death	Maid	Short film
2003	Bright Young Things	Mary Mouse	Director: Stephen Fry
2007	Waking the Dead	Elaine Wilson	2 episodes
2007	The Marchioness Disaster	Odette Penwarden	TV movie
2009	Comedy Showcase	Imogen Moffat	Episode: "Campus"
2009-2011	Campus	Imogen Moffat	7 episodes
2010-2012	Dirk Gently	Janice Pearce	4 episodes
2012	Panto!	Deborah	TV movie
2013	Common Ground	Jennifer	Episode: "Fergus & Crispin"
2013	Mr Selfridge	Lady Lushingham	1 episode
2013	Toast of London	Portia de Coogan	Episode: "Submission"
2014	Father Brown	Phyllis Stanwyck	Episode: "The Laws of Motion"
2015	Hoff the Record	Ellie Thomas	Episode: "Renew or Die"
2016	Holby City	Alice Butler	Episode: "Kiss and Tell"
2017	Quacks	Mina	3 episodes
2017	Eric, Ernie and Me	Glenda Jackson	TV movie
2019	End-O	Lisa	Short film
