= Victoria Pile =

British television director and producer

Victoria Pile, also known as Vicky Pile, is a British comedy writer, director and producer, most noted as the creator of two Channel 4 comedy programmes, the sketch show Smack the Pony and the sitcom Green Wing.

== Early life ==
Pile began her career writing for Not the Nine O'Clock News whilst still a student at University of Sussex. She has also written for Spitting Image and CBBC.

== Writer ==
- Not the Nine O'Clock News (1979–82)
- Dear Heart (1982–83)
- Karen Kay (1983–86)
- Pushing Up Daisies, later Coming Next... (1984–85)
- Lazarus and Dingwall (1991)
- You Gotta Be Jokin' (1991)
- Los Dos Bros (1999–2001)
- Smack the Pony (1999–2003)
- Green Wing (2004–2007)
- Campus (2009-2011)
- Piglets (2024)

She has also written a pilot for ABC, set in a police precinct in America. British Sitcom Guide states that "it isn't often that British writers deliberately pitch a series to the American market first".

== Producer / director ==
- Los Dos Bros (1999–2001)
- Smack the Pony (1999–2003)
- Green Wing (2004–2007)
- Campus (2009-2011)
- The Delivery Man (2015)
- Piglets (2024)
