= Will Adamsdale =

English actor (born 1974)

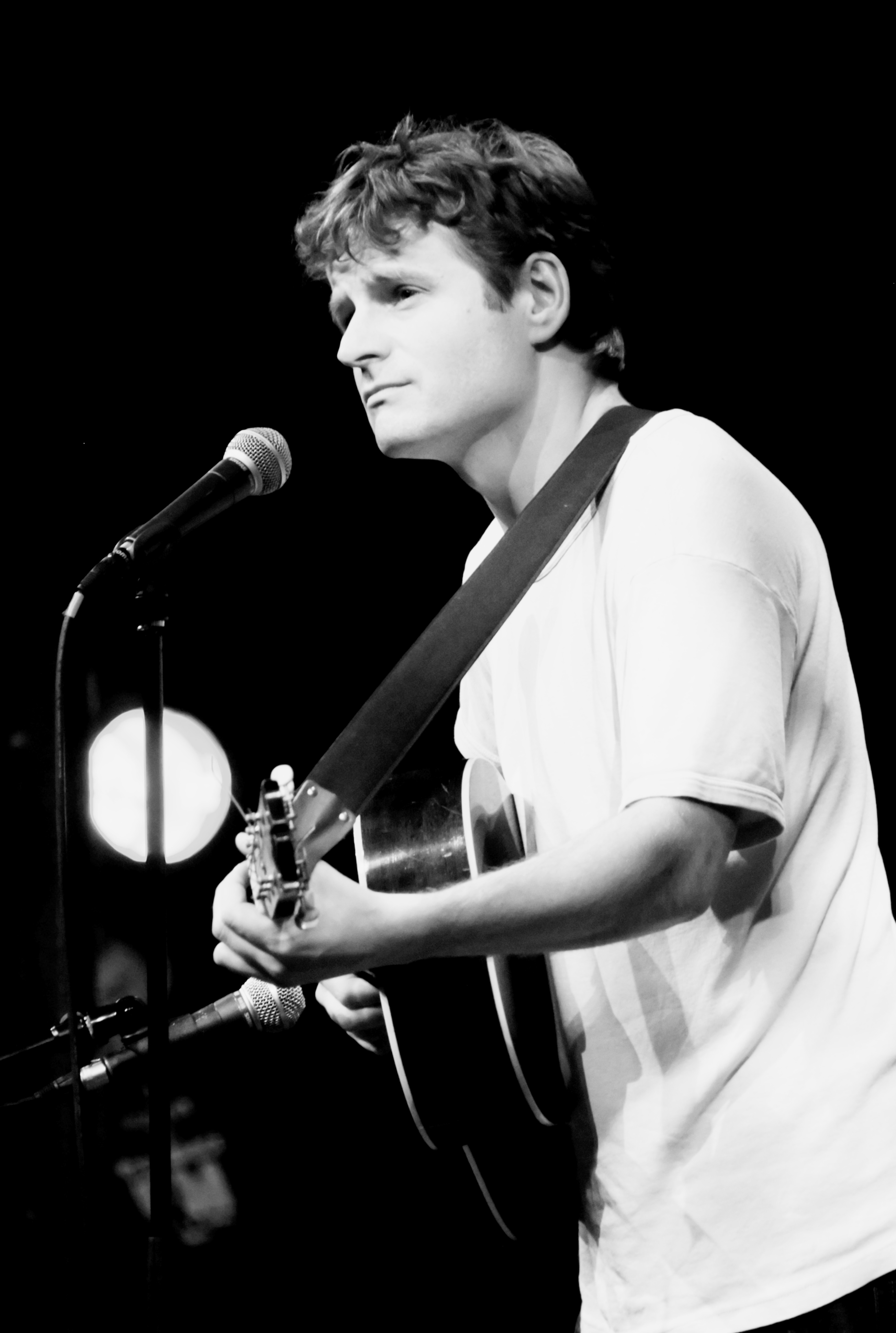
- Adamsdale performing live at the Resofit, a benefit event for Resonance FM
- Born: 1974 (age 51–52); Hereford, England
- Education: Eton College; Oxford School of Drama

Will Adamsdale (born 1974) is an English actor, comedian and writer. In 2004, he won the Edinburgh Comedy Award for Best Show at the Edinburgh Festival Fringe for his show Jackson's Way.

== Early life ==
Adamsdale was educated at Eton College and the Oxford School of Drama.

== Career ==
In 2004, he starred in a self-penned one man show called Jackson's Way at the Edinburgh Fringe. The intended run for the production was ten days, before the intervention of comedian Stewart Lee. Lee was so impressed by Adamsdale's work that he reportedly threw his full support behind Jackson's Way, lobbying for an extension of the run and using his clout within the industry to garner notice from critics and award committees. Adamsdale secured the Perrier Comedy Award for comedy.

Adamsdale has since created several new shows: The Receipt, The Human Computer, and The Summer House. The Receipt, a collaboration with sonic artist Chris Branch, used innovative sound effects to punctuate a story about the little man in the big city. It ran at the Edinburgh Fringe 2006, winning a Fringe First and a Total Theatre Award. It subsequently toured nationally, and internationally to the Melbourne Comedy Festival and 59E59 Theatres in New York.

In The Human Computer, Adamsdale, a self-confessed technophobe, explored the world of computers. The show premiered in the new Traverse 3 venue at the Edinburgh Fringe 2007.

He made his film acting debut in The Boat That Rocked as Newsreader John, in 2009.

From 2010 to 2011, he periodically performed with the comedy music collective, The London Snorkelling Team as the tap-dancing security expert.

He was a regular cast member of the Channel 4 2011 series Campus, playing Jason the university accountant.

Adamsdale wrote and starred in the musical-comedy play The Victorian in the Wall, which he co-directed alongside Lyndsey Turner. It made its debut at the Royal Court Theatre in 2011 and toured the UK in early 2013. Following positive reviews, It was later adapted to a BBC 4 Radio play of the same name in 2016, in which Adamsdale and his fellow original cast members reprised their roles.

At the 2013 Edinburgh Fringe, he played Fraser Ayres in double BAFTA-winning writer Jack Thorne's adaptation of Stuart: A Life Backwards, Alexander Masters' biography of Stuart Clive. The play continued its successful Edinburgh run into a two-week run at the Crucible Theatre.

As of 2022, Will is currently hosting a comedy night called Locally Sourced at the Little Drop Of Poison public house in Exeter. It is a showcase for new talent and new material. It was co-hosted with Charlotte Evans until November 2023. Spencer Jones took on the role of co-host upon her departure.

== Filmography ==
=== Film ===
Year	Title	Role	Notes
2005	Stoned	Andrew Loog-Oldham	
2009	The Boat That Rocked	News John	
2010	Four Lions	Alex	
2010	Skeletons	Simon	
2014	ABCs of Death 2	Director	In segment "B is for Badger"
2017	Journey's End	Lieutenant Hamison	
2018	Sgt. Stubby: An American Hero	Additional Voices	Voice role, English title: Sgt. Stubby: An Unlikely Hero
2018	Knights of the Realm	Johnno	Short film. Also producer, composer, and co-writer with Stewart Wright

=== Television ===
Year	Title	Role	Notes
1999	Warriors	Army Officer #1	Television film
2000	Bomber	Officer	Television film
2001	Sword of Honour	Officer Erskine	Television film
2002	Manchild	Justin	2 episodes
2004	Rosemary & Thyme	Simon Todd	
2009	Comedy Showcase	Jason Armitage	Pilot for Campus, semi-improvised
2011	Campus	Jason Armitage	Main role, semi-improvised
2015	The BBC at War	Voice-over	Docuseries, reading written BBC material
2023	Sebastian Adams		
2023	Stonehouse	Harry Evans	
2023	A Pack of Lies		

Key
†	Denotes television productions that have not yet been released

=== Stage ===
Year	Title	Actor	Director	Writer	Creator	Edinburgh Fringe	Tour	Role	Notes	Ref
2000	Small Craft Warnings	Yes						Bobby		
2000	Notes from Underground	Yes						Monologue		
2000	Dangerous Corner	Yes						Robert Caplan		
2000	Arcadia	Yes						Gus Coverley		
2001	The Winslow Boy	Yes						Dickie		
2004	Waters of the Moon	Yes						John Daly		
2004	Jackson's Way	Yes	Yes	Yes	Yes	Yes		Chris John Jackson	Winner of the Edinburgh Comedy Award for Best Show.	
2004	World Cup Final 1966	Yes						Bobby Moore		
2005-2006	The Receipt	Yes	Yes	Yes	Yes	Yes	Yes	Wiley	Co-writer and co-director with Chris Branch	
2007	The Human Computer	Yes	Yes	Yes	Yes	Yes	Yes	Self (Stand-up)		
2011	Jackson's Way: The London Jacksathon!	Yes	Yes	Yes	Yes		Yes	Chris John Jackson	26-date tour	
2011-2013	The Victorian in the Wall	Yes	Yes	Yes	Yes		Yes	Guy	Co-directed with Lyndsey Turner	
2014	Borders	Yes	Yes	Yes	Yes	Yes		Self (Stand-up)		
2017	Manwatching	Yes						Anonymous		
2018	The Lost Disc	Yes		Yes	Yes		Yes	Roger Le Fevre, Tony Noel, AP Williams		
2019	Facetime	Yes	Yes	Yes	Yes	Yes		Self (Stand-up)	2020 tour cancelled due to the COVID-19 pandemic	
2022–present	Locally Sourced			Yes	Yes			Host, Stand Up	Co-hosted with Spencer Jones	
2023	Melanjolly - A show of Just Songs	Yes	Yes	Yes	Yes	Yes		Self (Stand-up)		

== Honours ==
Year	Award	Work	Result	Ref.
2004	Edinburgh Comedy Award	Jackson's Way	Won	
