= Smack the Pony =

British sketch comedy television series (1999–2003)

- The Best of Smack the Pony DVD cover, featuring (left to right) Doon Mackichan, Fiona Allen and Sally Phillips
- Genre: Sketch comedy
- Created by: Victoria Pile
- Starring: Doon Mackichan; Fiona Allen; Sally Phillips; Sarah Alexander; Darren Boyd; Cavan Clerkin; Amanda Holden; James Lance
- Opening theme: "In the Middle of Nowhere" by Jackie Clune
- Country of origin: England
- Original language: English
- No. of series: 3 + two specials
- No. of episodes: 23 (including specials)

Production
- Running time: 23–24 minutes approx. 80 minutes approx. (The Best of Smack the Pony)

Original release
- Network: Channel 4
- Release: 19 March 1999 – 3 January 2003

Smack the Pony is a British sketch comedy show that was originally broadcast between 1999 and 2003 on Channel 4. The main performers on the show were Fiona Allen, Doon Mackichan and Sally Phillips. There were also regular appearances from Sarah Alexander, Darren Boyd and Cavan Clerkin. The show's theme tune was a version of the Dusty Springfield song "In the Middle of Nowhere", sung by Jackie Clune. In addition to the three principal cast members, the show was written by many writers, the core of whom went on to write Green Wing and Campus.

Among the show's regular themes were unsuccessful relationships, competition in the workplace, and latent lesbianism, but sketches would also dip into the surreal. Two regular strands involved a series of different women making dating agency videos about their general likes and dislikes, and a musical parody that would close the show.

== History ==
The show was created by Victoria Pile after being commissioned by Caroline Leddy of Channel 4 and Peter Fincham at Talkback, who believed that audiences would welcome a female-orientated sketch show.

The show's title was intended as a spoof of the kind of stories that would feature in annuals aimed at young girls. Originally "Spot the Pony", it was changed at Kevin Lygo's suggestion to "Smack the Pony" which some people mistakenly assumed was some kind of sexual euphemism.

A pilot was filmed featuring Sally Phillips, Fiona Allen and Amanda Holden. When a full series was commissioned Holden dropped out and Doon Mackichan took her place. Holden still appeared in four episodes of the first series.

Other contributors making regular appearances were Sarah Alexander, Darren Boyd and Cavan Clerkin, while Miranda Hart also appeared in three episodes of the third series.

In Germany, the first transmission of the show aired on ProSieben, where the theme tune was changed to Texas's 2001 version of "I Don't Want a Lover", and featured a different title sequence.

Deliberately silly and avoiding repetitive catchphrases, the show's surreal humour proved popular and the series had a regular audience of around 2.5 million viewers in the UK.

In 2003 the show's leads announced that they would not be continuing with the format, preferring to quit while the show was a success rather than risk diminishing the quality of the material.

The trio reunited for a skit in aid of Comic Relief for Red Nose Day 2017.

== Selected characters ==
Most of the characters in the programme are non-recurring.

Dating Agency Videos – A part of almost every episode, we see different women or often sisters/couples looking for a partner/partners. This was at first represented by a title screen featuring a picture of the person, and their name and age. This then was replaced by that of a website page.

Irritating Flatmate – An irritating nurse who shares a flat with two of her colleagues. She emphasises everything, which often leads to her flatmates' doing something behind her back, such as adding soap and cleaning chemicals to her yoghurt.

The Fake Diabetic – A woman who fakes diabetic hypoglycemia so she can have special offers and free items at shops and supermarkets, and which the staff treats seriously. This skit only happened from series 3 onwards.

The Oblivious Women – Consists of three women (in different sketches) who are completely oblivious to very obvious things. Sketches included a dog-walking woman being asked to sign a petition so that owners could walk their dogs near the pond. She says that she is not a dog person and is actually phobic. The petitioner and woman look down causing the woman to realise she is walking a dog and then scream. Others included a woman not realising she was pregnant until being asked to sign a petition affecting children.

Singing Match – In this sketch, a woman sings along to a tune on the radio, only to be outshone completely by her co-worker who takes over in the following verse. During the rest of the song, her singing becomes more and more intense and extreme as she tries to get back at the other singer, and she ends up screaming and excusing herself with a paper cut on her finger. This particular sketch was voted number 22 in the 2005 Channel 4 programme 50 Greatest Comedy Sketches, chosen by members of the public. It was written by Marie Findley of the Mediæval Bæbes and was also based on their antics.

Competitive rivals – This involves the four women who try to 'outdo' each other by subtly showing off bigger and better items such as water bottles and gifts.

Naked man – This recurring skit appears in a few first series episodes. The female cast members are going about their daily business when a totally naked man walks across the screen, gets off from bus etc. and causes the women to faint, then they pick themselves up.

High-heeled woman – This sketch was spread over all the series, and had a woman performing sports (such as a relay race or surfing) wearing inappropriate high-heeled shoes. An alternative version of this skit is a woman swimming or shopping in a wedding dress.

The "Vet" – The sketch featured more prominently from the second series. It featured a vet who had difficulty recognising animals, who would then recommend silly and unusual diagnoses to the animals, such as telling a woman her kitten needed glasses.

The Ex – Another sketch that featured more in the second series. A woman clings to the leg of her ex-boyfriend constantly (at work, a nightclub, and even clinging to his leg at his wedding etc.), telling him that she is still in love with him, and hopes to reconcile (unsuccessfully, however).

== List of episodes ==
=== Series 1 (1999) ===
- Episode 1: 19 March 1999
- Episode 2: 26 March 1999
- Episode 3: 2 April 1999
- Episode 4: 9 April 1999
- Episode 5: 16 April 1999
- Episode 6: 23 April 1999
- Episode 7: 30 April 1999

=== Series 2 (2000) ===
- Episode 1: 14 April 2000
- Episode 2: 21 April 2000
- Episode 3: 28 April 2000
- Episode 4: 5 May 2000
- Episode 5: 12 May 2000
- Episode 6: 19 May 2000
- Episode 7: 26 May 2000

=== Series 3 (2002) ===
- Episode 1: 11 January 2002
- Episode 2: 18 January 2002
- Episode 3: 25 January 2002
- Episode 4: 1 February 2002
- Episode 5: 8 February 2002
- Episode 6: 15 February 2002
- Episode 7: 22 February 2002

=== Specials (2002–2003) ===
- Special 1: 26 December 2002
- Special 2: 3 January 2003

== Awards ==
In 1999 and 2000, the first two series of Smack the Pony won the Emmy Award for the 'Best Popular Arts Show', and all three series were nominated for BAFTA awards.

Two sketches from the show made it onto Channel 4's 50 Greatest Comedy Sketches, the first being Saying Goodbye at number 39 and Singing Match at number 22.

== Video, DVD and streaming ==
In Britain, a VHS and DVD of The Best of Smack the Pony were released in 2002 and 2003, respectively. The complete first and second series were released on DVD in Germany (dubbed in German but with alternative English soundtrack) in January and June 2006, respectively.

Series 1–3 plus the Christmas Specials are available to stream in the UK on Channel 4.

The complete series 1–3 have been released on DVD in Scandinavia by Pan Vision and Finnkino in 2008. It features original soundtrack with Swedish, Finnish, Norwegian and Danish subtitles but excludes the specials.

The series is currently available in the United States on Hulu.com as of at least 2012.

== Russian version ==
Russian TNT-TV hosts a localised version of the show titled Women's League (Russian: Женская Лига, Zhenskaya Liga). The show uses some recurring themes from the original, as well as the original content.
