= Peter Ferdinando =

British character actor

- Born: London
- Occupation: Actor
- Notable work: Hyena

Peter Ferdinando is a British character actor, known for his varied performances.

== Career ==
He has collaborated extensively with director and cousin Gerard Johnson, playing the title role in the short film Tony (2005), and in its expanded feature film of the same name in 2009. Ferdinando won the Best Actor Award at Les Arcs Film Festival for his performance in their 2014 collaboration, Hyena.

He played the King Pin Spencer in David Mackenzie's prison drama Starred Up.

He also regularly collaborates with British filmmaker Ben Wheatley, having played Jacob in A Field in England, The Half-Face Man in "Deep Breath", the first episode of series 8 of Doctor Who, and Paul in Wheatley's High-Rise.

More recent work includes Tommy's Honour with Peter Mullan, directed by Jason Connery, Ghost in the Shell, with Scarlett Johansson and Juliet Binoche, directed by Rupert Sanders, and Guy Ritchie's King Arthur: Legend of the Sword, with Jude Law. In 2017, he starred in Woody Harrelson's experimental, live film directorial debut Lost In London alongside Owen Wilson, Willie Nelson and Woody Harrelson.

== Personal life ==
Peter lives in London. He is also cousin of Matt Johnson, an English singer-songwriter best known as the vocalist and only constant member of his band, The The.

== Filmography ==
=== Film ===
Year	Title	Role	Notes
1992	Soft Top Hard Shoulder	Homeless Youth	
1997	Face	Policeman	
1998	Titanic Town	Soldier	
2001	Bodywork	Alex Gordon	
2004	Mug	Mug	
2005	Tony	Tony	
2009	Tony	Tony Benson	
2012	Snow White and the Huntsman	The Black Knight	
2013	A Field in England	Jacob	
2013	Starred Up	Dennis Spencer	
2014	300: Rise of an Empire	Greek Ambassador	
2014	Hyena	Michael	Winner of the Best Actor Award at Les Arcs Film Festival
2016	High-Rise	Cosgrove	
2016	Tommy's Honour	Major Molesworth	
2017	Ghost in the Shell	Cutter	
2017	King Arthur: Legend of the Sword	Earl of Mercia	
2018	Blue Iguana	Deacon Bradshaw	
2018	Vita and Virginia	Leonard Woolf	
2019	Happy New Year, Colin Burstead	Jimmy	
2020	Archive	Mr. Tagg	
2023	Operation Fortune: Ruse de Guerre	Mike	

=== Television ===
Year	Title	Role	Notes
1989–2000	The Bill	Various	7 episodes
1989, 1994	London's Burning	Steve / 2nd Youth	2 episodes
1990	Screenplay	Vincent Maguire	Episode: "A Safe House"
1990	Close to Home	Michael	Episode: "Council of War"
1992	Between the Lines	Vernon Brandell	Episode: "Out of the Game"
1993	Frank Stubbs	Lee's Mate	Episode: "Wheels"
1993	Casualty	Policeman	Episode: "Riders on the Storm"
1993	If You See God, Tell Him	Jobsworth Youth 1	Miniseries, 1 episode
1996	Soldier Soldier	Para 2	Episode: "Money for Nothing"
1999	Butterfly Collectors	Park Copper	Miniseries
2002	Family Affairs	Michael Lacey	3 episodes
2002	My Family	Gareth	Episode: "The Mummy Returns"
2006	Hustle	Flash Git	Episode: "The Henderson Challenge"
2006	The Only Boy for Me	Bob	Television film
2007	HolbyBlue	Steven Price	2 episodes
2011	Injustice	John Slater	2 episodes
2013	Ripper Street	Peter Morris	Episode: "Tournament of Shadows"
2013	The Mimic	Jesse	3 episodes
2014	Doctor Who	Half-Face Man	Episode: "Deep Breath"
2015	Safe House	Michael	4 episodes
2019	Hanna	Lukas	Episode: "City"
2020	The Letter for the King	Jaro	Main cast
2022	The Curse	Crazy Clive Cornell	
2025	MobLand	Valjon	4 episodes
