= Tony (2009 film) =

- Theatrical release poster
- Directed by: Gerard Johnson
- Written by: Gerard Johnson
- Produced by: Dan McCulloch
- Starring: Peter Ferdinando; Lorenzo Camporese; Ricky Grover; Neil Maskell
- Cinematography: David Higgs
- Music by: Matt Johnson
- Production company: AbbottVision
- Distributed by: Revolver Entertainment
- Release dates: 18 June 2009 (Edinburgh Film Festival); 5 February 2010 (United Kingdom)
- Running time: 76 minutes
- Country: United Kingdom
- Language: English

Tony, also known as Tony: London Serial Killer, is a 2009 British psychological drama written and directed by Gerard Johnson and starring Peter Ferdinando.

== Plot ==
Tony Benson lives alone in a flat on a Dalston council estate tower block. He obsessively collects 1980s violent action movies, and he aimlessly wanders the streets of London most days in unsuccessful attempts to connect with other people. He is extremely socially anxious, has severe mental development problems and has difficulty trying to express himself or communicate naturally. He has been unemployed and living on state benefits for over 20 years.

He is soon revealed to be a serial killer, killing men he encounters by chance, including two drug addicts whom he uncomfortably tries to engage with after inviting them to his home to smoke heroin. The encounter ends with Tony suffocating one of them with a plastic bag while locking the other in a cupboard before letting him go, believing the terrified addict wouldn't go to the police.

The rare visitors Tony does get usually complain of the rotting smell from his house, which he blames on clogged drains. Others he meets at gay bars before bringing them back to his flat and usually end with him rejecting their advances and killing them, similar in fashion to Dennis Nilsen. He also gets dismissed and thrown out of a brothel after visiting a prostitute with only £5, asking the price of a cuddle and failing in his attempt to strike up a conversation with her.

Tony disposes of the bodies of his victims by butchering their torsos and human organs in his kitchen sink before bagging them and dumping them in the River Thames and canals in London. He shares a bed with a rotting corpse, obviously one of his victims, and drags bodies which are stashed around the house out to put on the couch to sit and watch TV with him.

Tony comes under strong suspicion from a violent, trigger-tempered drunk (played by Ricky Grover) when his son goes missing. Grover bullies Tony with volleys of verbal and physical abuse in every encounter they have, including grabbing, shoving and spitting on him. Grover accuses Tony of being a paedophile and wrongly blames him for his son's disappearance. Tony becomes suspect number one because of his unusual appearance and his withdrawn nature towards other people. A police detective visits to question him on the missing boy's whereabouts and is very confrontational, putting Tony at risk of being discovered.

However, the detective receives a call, interrupting his search of Tony's home just as Tony eyes up a sharp potato peeler and contemplates the dangerous decision to attack and kill him. The boy is soon discovered — absolving Tony — and delivered home to the applause of the relieved neighbourhood; Tony watches on from his living room window. The film ends with Tony casually walking around London, free to pursue his murderous ways.

== Critical response ==
The film received generally positive reviews and holds a 76% positive rating, with an average rating of 6.21 (out of 10) on Rotten Tomatoes based on 17 reviews.
