= Green Wing Special =

- Green Wing episode
- The cover of the Green Wing Special DVD.
- Directed by: Tristram Shapeero; Dominic Brigstocke
- Written by: Victoria Pile; Robert Harley; Gary Howe; Stuart Kenworthy; Oriane Messina; Richard Preddy; Fay Rusling; James Henry

Guest appearance
- Jeremy Sheffield

The "Green Wing Special" is the final episode of the British sitcom Green Wing. It was first broadcast in Australia and Belgium on 29 December 2006. It was aired on 4 January 2007 in the United Kingdom. The episode is sometimes billed as a Christmas special, although the episode contains nothing Christmas related. The special is 90 minutes long, around twice the length of a normal episode.

The special continues the plot from the end of the second series of Green Wing, which ended with Caroline Todd (played by Tamsin Greig) becoming engaged to Guy Secretan (Stephen Mangan), "Mac" Macartney (Julian Rhind-Tutt) learning that he was going to die, Alan Statham (Mark Heap) and Joanna Clore (Pippa Haywood) fleeing from the police after they murdered Joanna's cousin, and Karen Ball (Lucinda Raikes) having a dramatic change of personality after she fell out of a window. While this was the final episode of Green Wing, an alternative ending was produced in case a third series was written. There was an argument between the cast and the writers about which ending should have been used. The special received mixed reviews from both critics and fans.

== Plot ==
The episode begins at a funeral, attended by Guy, Caroline, Boyce (Oliver Chris), Martin Dear (Karl Theobald) and Sue White (Michelle Gomez). References made in the episode lead the viewer to believe that it is Mac's funeral, but then a giant picture of Angela Hunter (Sarah Alexander), who left the hospital in mid-series two, appears. The cause of her death is not fully explained, although comments made by the characters indicate she died in a hunting accident with a moose. The plot then splits between three groups of characters.

=== Caroline, Guy and Mac ===
Mac returns to work after a month's leave. When Caroline meets him, she implies that she is engaged to Guy. Mac and Guy are then drunk in a bar, where Mac tells Guy he is going to die in a couple of weeks and makes Guy promise he will not tell Caroline. However, Guy tells Martin, who then complains to him about his selfishness. Caroline walks in and overhears the argument. Meanwhile, Mac suggests to Sue that she find someone else to love. Caroline confronts Mac about marrying her. Mac defends himself by saying it would be better for her to marry Guy because he will live longer. Guy later decides to do the right thing, and tells Mac to propose to Caroline because they love each other. Caroline and Mac therefore become engaged and later marry. The majority of the core cast attend the wedding. At the wedding, Sue is seen with a new boyfriend. The special ends with Caroline floating away into the sky holding a mass of helium balloons.

=== Alan and Joanna ===
After being rescued by Martin while they were teetering over the edge of a cliff in a stolen campervan, Alan and Joanna are on the run, believing the police are after them for the murder of Joanna's cousin. They go to a garage to get the van checked for faults, but, as they leave, Joanna accidentally runs over the mechanic by putting the van in the wrong gear and reversing into him. They then try to rob a corner shop and Joanna tells Alan to sit on the shopkeeper to restrain her, but this causes Alan to accidentally suffocate her. Back at the hospital, Boyce begins to miss Alan after discovering his replacement is worse than him. Boyce's plotline with Alan is concluded when Alan telephones him to say goodbye, almost confirming the strange love they have for each other, but instead telling him (in code) that he is "flying west".

Later, Alan and Joanna are stopped by a policeman on suspicion of stealing the campervan. Joanna gets her peanut butter sandwich and smears it in the policeman's face. Alan and Joanna have an argument about the minute odds of the policeman having a peanut allergy and going into anaphylaxis, while in the background this is actually happening. They then carry the body of the policeman into the van. Soon, having run out of food and petrol, Alan changes the engine to run on alcohol and fermented excrement. The plan is of no use, however, as the van explodes. They soon reach the beach and Joanna gives Alan three options: give themselves up, swim the English Channel to Spain, or commit suicide. As Alan is not keen on the Spanish, they choose the third option and are last seen walking naked into the sea, presumably to their deaths–– although the alternate ending shows them hanging on to a buoy some time later.

=== Admin girls ===
Having fallen out of a window, Karen walks into the office dressed smartly and feistier. However, she has lost a hand and her nose whistles when she has an orgasm. When the girls realise that Joanna is not there to control them they start going wild. They start off by doing mild things such as swapping desks and tipping up litter, then become wilder by interviewing people and asking people to pull their trousers down. Slowly, the scene turns into a "Lord of the Flies" situation. They soon begin to argue and Harriet Schulenburg (Olivia Colman) decides to become the new Joanna. Martin is captured by Naughty Rachel (Katie Lyons), Kim Alabaster (Sally Bretton) and Karen, chanting "Kill the doctor" at him. Martin calls for his mummy (Joanna), but when Harriet comes out into the office she proclaims she is the "new mummy in town", and he is dragged into the office. However, Martin somehow manages to escape by means unknown.

== Production ==
The production on the special was similar to that of the other episodes, with the hospital scenes being shot in the usual locations (the Northwick Park Hospital in Middlesex and the North Hampshire Hospital in Basingstoke). The script was written by the usual eight-person team led by Victoria Pile, and produced and directed by the same people who recorded all the previous episodes. The special was recorded at the same time as the second series. The exterior scenes were harder to shoot. In the beginning funeral scene, one of the mourners is Alan Yentob, who had been filming an episode of the BBC One documentary series Imagine. Stephen Mangan said that Martin's mime during the funeral was one of his favourite moments in Green Wing. The opening titles of the episode differ from the others as it does not use the normal theme tune, "Last Week", (as it is named in the original television soundtrack) and instead uses the track, "Camel".

There were some improvised scenes. These included a scene in the beginning of the episode where Alan and Joanna are in a middle of a field and the scene begins with a low-angle shot. Later, when Alan is "humping" Joanna, the scene suddenly becomes a crane shot. This is because the crew at the time had a crane camera after they had finished filming the final scenes in series 2 where Alan, Joanna and Martin are teetering over the edge of a cliff in the stolen camper van. The camper van scenes were the hardest to shoot, especially the scene where the van explodes, as this had to be done in one take. Another problem was the smell of the van, which Pippa Haywood said, "smelt of old dogs." The van also suffered other problems such as bits of the steering wheel and gear stick coming off. Julian Rhind-Tutt commented that the scene where Alan and Boyce talk together for the last time was one of the most moving scenes in the whole of Green Wing. The wedding was shot at Hall of Bayham Abbey in Kent, where the crew had difficulty filming due to bad weather. The show also features a guest appearance from Jeremy Sheffield near the end of the episode as Sue's new boyfriend.

The DVD of the special was released on 8 January, four days after its premiere in the UK. Features include the alternate ending, a "Behind the Scenes" featurette, 20 minutes of deleted scenes and commentary from many of the main cast, which includes commentary from some foreign relatives of Michelle Gomez who had not seen the show before. Three extra deleted scenes from the special were later released in "The Definitive Collection" DVD boxset.

=== Alternative ending ===
An alternative ending was made for the special, which was never broadcast, but was put as an extra on the DVD. In this version of the ending, when Mac sees Caroline floating away, he runs down the stairs and out of the castle to save her. Caroline begins to descend, and both Mac and Guy grab hold of one her legs to bring her down, but instead they are lifted into the air with her. While the three fly away, Caroline exclaims "We're all going to die!", to which Mac quite sternly says "Caroline, there's something I've been meaning to tell you," opening the possibility that Mac is not going to die. Meanwhile, Alan and Joanna, after walking into the sea, are last seen hanging onto a buoy waiting to drown. They are still talking while waiting for the ocean to drown them.

This ending was the favourite amongst the actors. Mangan said that the alternative ending was the best moment in the whole of Green Wing. However, the alternative ending was rejected and the writers favoured the ending that was eventually broadcast. It is believed that the alternative ending would have been broadcast if a third series was being made, as that ending was much more ambiguous, since Alan and Joanna are still seen alive and Mac tells Caroline that he still has something to say. In fact, for the recording of the DVD commentary, they were watching the special with the alternative ending, indicating that the decision to switch endings was made sometime between recording of the commentary and broadcast. Speaking on the commentary, Rhind-Tutt says that he was glad that after much discussion they chose the ending "they all wanted", with "the three of them flying off together", however, this was not the version that was eventually broadcast.

== Reception ==
When the special was first broadcast, it was watched by 1.7 million viewers, 11% of the total audience. However, these ratings are poor compared to other programmes. For example, an episode of Desperate Housewives shown the previous night attracted 2.8 million viewers. Responses from critics were mixed. Matt Baylis said, "Like a homegrown ER on laughing gas, this show will be sorely missed," and Ian Johns said, "It was like a Richard Curtis romcom, albeit one force-fed magic mushrooms." In The Guardian, Sam Wollaston wrote that it was one of the funniest shows on British television, alongside the satirical sitcom The Thick of It, saying, "The Thick of It is clever-funny, Green Wing is mad-funny." Wollaston opined that while the dramatic elements of the show, such as Mac's death, were good, Alan and Joanna's storyline was most entertaining. "Mark Heap and Pippa Haywood, who play them, have been the shining lights in an already glittering show. They, and it, will be sorely missed," he said. David Butcher in the Radio Times wrote that, "Green Wing's sublime comic acting and a vein of shrieking madness in the writing make it very hard to beat."

Paul Whitelaw, however, attacked both the series and the special, saying, "This final instalment was typically awful, more so considering its length." Fans of the show thought that while the special was good, it was not the greatest episode of Green Wing made. Some thought the special concentrated too much on the drama instead of the comedy. Some were confused by the final ending and others complained about the lack of appearances made by Sue White.
