= List of The Thick of It characters =

The Thick of It is a British television comedy programme that premiered in 2005 on BBC Four. The series satirises the inner workings of modern British government. It follows the running of a fictional Department of Social Affairs and Citizenship, and most episodes focus on that department's incumbent minister and a core cast of advisors and civil servants, under the watchful eye of Number 10's enforcer, Malcolm Tucker (Peter Capaldi). The supporting characters include people in government, in the opposition, and in the media.

== Table ==
Character	Actor	Series 1			Series 2			Specials		Series 3								Series 4						
Character	Actor	1	2	3	1	2	3	1	2	1	2	3	4	5	6	7	8	1	2	3	4	5	6	7
The Government (Series 1–3) / Opposition (Series 4)
Malcolm Tucker	Peter Capaldi	Yes	Yes	Yes	Yes	Yes	Yes	Yes	Yes	Yes	Yes	Yes	Yes	Yes	Yes	Yes	Yes	No	Yes	No	Yes	Yes	Yes	Yes
Hugh Abbot MP	Chris Langham	Yes	Yes	Yes	Yes	Yes	Yes	No	No	No	No	No	No	No	No	No	No	No	No	No	No	No	No	No
Nicola Murray MP	Rebecca Front	No	No	No	No	No	No	No	No	Yes	Yes	Yes	Yes	Yes	Yes	Yes	Yes	No	Yes	No	Yes	Yes	Yes	Yes
Ollie Reeder	Chris Addison	Yes	Yes	Yes	Yes	Yes	Yes	Yes	Yes	Yes	Yes	Yes	Yes	Yes	Yes	Yes	Yes	No	Yes	No	Yes	Yes	Yes	Yes
Glenn Cullen	James Smith	Yes	Yes	Yes	Yes	Yes	Yes	Yes	Yes	Yes	Yes	Yes	Yes	Yes	Yes	Yes	Yes	Yes	No	Yes	Yes	Yes	Yes	Yes
Cliff Lawton MP	Tim Bentinck	Yes	No	No	No	No	No	No	Yes	No	No	No	No	No	No	No	No	No	No	No	No	No	No	No
Dan Miller MP	Tony Gardner	No	No	Yes	No	No	No	No	Yes	No	No	No	No	No	No	No	No	No	No	No	Yes	Yes	No	Yes
Geoff Holhurst MP	Rob Edwards	No	No	No	Yes	No	No	No	Yes	No	No	No	No	No	No	No	No	No	Yes	No	No	No	No	No
Jamie McDonald	Paul Higgins	No	No	No	Yes	Yes	No	Yes	Yes	No	No	No	No	No	No	No	No	No	No	No	No	No	No	No
Lord Julius Nicholson	Alex Macqueen	No	No	No	No	Yes	No	Yes	Yes	No	No	No	No	No	No	Yes	Yes	No	No	No	No	No	No	No
Claire Ballentine MP	Eve Matheson	No	No	No	No	No	Yes	Yes	Yes	No	No	No	No	No	No	No	No	No	No	No	No	No	No	No
Ben Swain MP	Justin Edwards	No	No	No	No	No	No	Yes	Yes	No	No	No	No	No	Yes	No	No	No	Yes	No	Yes	Yes	No	No
John Duggan	Miles Jupp	No	No	No	No	No	No	No	No	No	No	Yes	No	No	No	No	No	No	No	No	Yes	No	No	No
Steve Fleming MP	David Haig	No	No	No	No	No	No	No	No	No	No	No	No	No	No	Yes	Yes	No	No	No	No	No	No	No
Sam Cassidy	Samantha Harrington	No	No	Yes	No	No	No	No	No	No	No	No	No	Yes	No	Yes	Yes	No	Yes	No	No	Yes	Yes	Yes
Helen Hatley	Rebecca Gethings	No	No	No	No	No	No	No	No	No	No	No	No	No	No	No	No	No	Yes	No	Yes	Yes	No	Yes
Civil Service
Terri Coverley	Joanna Scanlan	Yes	Yes	Yes	No	No	Yes	Yes	Yes	Yes	Yes	Yes	Yes	Yes	Yes	Yes	Yes	Yes	No	Yes	No	Yes	Yes	Yes
Robyn Murdoch	Polly Kemp	No	No	No	Yes	Yes	Yes	No	Yes	No	Yes	No	No	No	No	No	No	No	No	No	No	Yes	Yes	No
The Opposition (Specials–Series 3) / Coalition Government (Series 4)
Peter Mannion MP	Roger Allam	No	No	No	No	No	No	Yes	No	No	No	No	Yes	Yes	No	No	Yes	Yes	No	Yes	No	Yes	Yes	Yes
Stewart Pearson	Vincent Franklin	No	No	No	No	No	No	Yes	No	No	No	No	Yes	Yes	No	No	Yes	Yes	No	Yes	No	Yes	Yes	Yes
Emma Messinger	Olivia Poulet	No	No	No	No	No	No	Yes	No	No	No	No	Yes	Yes	No	No	Yes	Yes	No	Yes	No	Yes	Yes	Yes
Phil Smith	Will Smith	No	No	No	No	No	No	Yes	No	No	No	No	Yes	Yes	No	No	Yes	Yes	No	Yes	No	Yes	Yes	Yes
Adam Kenyon (formerly press)	Ben Willbond	No	No	No	No	No	No	No	Yes	No	No	No	No	No	No	No	No	Yes	No	Yes	No	Yes	Yes	Yes
Fergus Williams MP	Geoffrey Streatfeild	No	No	No	No	No	No	No	No	No	No	No	No	No	No	No	No	Yes	No	Yes	No	Yes	Yes	Yes
Cal Richards	Tom Hollander	No	No	No	No	No	No	No	No	No	No	No	No	No	No	No	Yes	No	No	No	No	No	No	No
Mary Drake MP	Sylvestra Le Touzel	No	No	No	No	No	No	No	No	No	No	No	No	No	No	No	No	No	No	Yes	No	No	No	Yes
Press
Angela Heaney	Lucinda Raikes	Yes	Yes	No	No	No	Yes	Yes	Yes	No	No	Yes	No	No	No	No	No	No	No	No	No	No	No	No
Marianne Swift	Zoe Telford	No	No	No	No	No	No	No	No	No	Yes	No	No	No	No	Yes	No	No	No	No	No	No	No	No
Geoffrey	Peter Sullivan	No	No	No	No	No	No	No	No	No	Yes	No	No	No	No	Yes	No	No	No	No	No	No	No	No
Declan	Michael Colgan	No	No	No	No	No	No	No	No	No	No	No	No	No	No	No	No	No	Yes	No	No	No	No	Yes

== Cast ==
=== The Government (Series 1–3) / Opposition (Series 4) ===
Name	Actor	Role(s)	Duration
Malcolm Tucker	Peter Capaldi	Former Media Adviser to the Leader of the Opposition (former General Election Advisor, Director of Communications, Number 10)	Series 1, 2, 3, 4 & Specials
Tucker is played by Peter Capaldi (pictured in 2009) Tucker is the aggressive, profane and feared Director of communications for the Government. He serves two main roles: acting as the party enforcer to ensure the cabinet ministers all follow the party line, and managing the government's crisis management PR – usually in the form of spin. He regularly uses rumours, smears, or threats of extreme violence to achieve his ends. He is usually seen talking to various people on his mobile phone. His reputation precedes him in his own party, the media and even among the opposition. One of the members of the Goolding Inquiry summarises some of the comments made about him in Series 4, Episode 6: "Malcolm Tucker has the physical demeanour and the political instincts of a velociraptor" (The Guardian); "Tucker's writ runs through the lifeblood of Westminster like raw alcohol, at once cleansing and corroding" (The Daily Telegraph); "If you make eye contact with Malcolm Tucker, you have spilled his pint (The Times); "Iago with a BlackBerry" (The Spectator). In Series 3, Episode 5, Peter Mannion also refers to him as the "Gorbals Goebbels", ostensibly a reference to Tucker's place of origin. Incidentally, neither his fierce reputation nor his permanent leverage over the media and the Government prevent him from being routinely teased and taunted about his background, even by subordinates such as Ollie and Terri. Fellow spin doctor Steve Fleming forces him to resign in Series 3, but Tucker regains his position, giving a foul-mouthed battle speech to the ministers in the Series finale. In Series 4 he returns, bored of two years in opposition, working for the new Leader of the Opposition Nicola Murray MP. In episode 4 of Series 4, he launches a concerted attack on Nicola's leadership, forcing her to resign as leader and allowing Dan Miller to take her place. At the end of series 4, an accidental admission at the Goolding Inquiry into governmental leaks makes it clear he has committed perjury. In the final episode of the series, he resigns as Director of Communications upon hearing that the Crown Prosecution Service intends to press charges and goes to the police station to surrender himself. He is arguably the protagonist as much as an antihero, and the series is rife with scenes denoting a rather complex personality. In spite of his brash, impulsive and volatile persona, he is strongly implied to be more intelligent and adept at long-term thinking than all or most of the other characters. His constant scheming, although "Machiavellian" in the words of Hugh Abbot, is paradoxically aimed at a common good, namely the prevalence of the party line and the resolution of issues arising from ministerial incompetence. This is in contrast to apparently friendly characters such as Ollie, who come across as covertly self-serving and egotistical by comparison. Tucker is implied to be a self-made man of humble origins, a firm believer in meritocracy and a staunch opponent of classism. He compares the intentions of an MP's daughter to capitalise on her family connections to the practices of the Russian Empire and "the fucking Dimblebys". His demeanour towards working class characters or those outside of the political sphere is sincerely empathetic, gentlemanly and devoid of condescension, as opposed to the obnoxious and patronising behaviour displayed by characters such as Swain or Pearson towards hotel receptionists or cleaners. Tucker is very respectful towards his secretary, Sam, and also allows his fellow Scotsman, Press Officer Jamie McDonald, to criticise him without retaliation. Tucker is also the main character in the feature-film spin-off In the Loop, and one out of only four who have the same name in both. The character in both the series and the film was partly modelled on Alastair Campbell, as well as Hollywood agents and producers – notably Harvey Weinstein. His film portrayal is arguably less sympathetic, and his actions seem less fuelled by ideological persuasion than by an interest to keep his job at all costs. His ruthless scheming is brought to the extreme of being a willing (and very active) pawn in the efforts of a warmongering U.S. Assistant Secretary of State towards an intervention in the Middle East. Campbell, who by his own admission enjoyed and found The Thick of It "hilarious", was vocal in his dislike for In the Loop.
Rt Hon Hugh Abbot MP	Chris Langham	Secretary of State for Social Affairs (later Social Affairs and Citizenship)	Series 1 and 2
Abbot is a Cabinet Minister, arguably the main character of the first two series, taking up his position following the resignation of Cliff Lawton. While he believes he has some influence with the PM, he is out of touch with the electorate and often finds himself at the mercy of events, bearing the brunt of Tucker's vitriol when misjudged policies or statements play badly in the media. He reads the New Statesman and has two young children, Alicia and Charlie, with wife Kate, whom he complains he rarely gets to see. He is replaced by Nicola Murray in a reshuffle at the beginning of series 3, without appearing on screen, having gone on holiday to Australia for the duration of the Specials.
Rt Hon Nicola Murray MP	Rebecca Front	Former Leader of the Opposition (former Secretary of State for Social Affairs and Citizenship)	Series 3 and 4
Murray is played by Rebecca Front (pictured in 2009) Nicola Alison Murray is promoted to Secretary of State for Social Affairs and Citizenship in a government reshuffle in the run up to a general election. Generally well-meaning but clearly unfit for the political game, she has a complex relationship with Malcolm throughout Series 3 and 4, during which he is at times supportive and at times prone to sabotaging her leadership. She is first compromised by him when he demands that she either tell her husband James to resign from his job or send her daughter Ella to a comprehensive school, rather than her preferred choice of an independent school. Her husband works for a PFI company called Albany, who were heavily involved in the government's prison rebuilding policy. She witnesses Malcolm's sacking near the end of Series 3 and refuses his request for help, although it is unclear how effective her intervention would have been by then. However, she is the only main character aside from Sam Cassidy not to celebrate Malcolm's departure and it is left to the audience to decide whether this is because of redeeming qualities she perceives in Malcolm, or because the ruling party has just lost its only protecting screen against the media. In a deleted scene she says that it is because she does not believe he is really gone. By Episode 2 of Series 4 she has been elected Party Leader and the Leader of the Opposition for nearly two years and remains just as inept. She had gained the post because of the transferable vote system that the Party uses to elect its leaders, which resulted in the Party getting second-best when they needed a strong leader. In Episode 4 of series 4 she resigns after Malcolm launches a concerted and extreme attack on her standing in the party, as she had, while in government, supported a scheme which ultimately led to the suicide of a homeless nurse, Douglas Tickel. At the Goolding Inquiry, she denied that her husband had a vested interest in the PFI scheme and stated her belief that Malcolm Tucker was responsible for the leaking of the PFI email that led to her resignation. It is shown in the final episode that, although she desires an eventual return to front-line politics, Murray is still considered an object of derision and ridicule, and her political career is almost certainly over. She dislikes using lifts as she is slightly claustrophobic. She is implied to be in a loveless and unhappy marriage with a man called James. She has three daughters and one son. Front reportedly spoke to an unknown former Cabinet minister for inspiration of her role, and it has been speculated that she is a composite of several former Labour Cabinet ministers, including Hazel Blears, Jacqui Smith and Tessa Jowell
Oliver Francis "Ollie" Reeder	Chris Addison	Director of Communications for the Opposition; Policy Adviser to the Leader of the Opposition (former Special Adviser/Junior Policy Adviser to the Secretary of State, DoSAC)	Series 1, 2, 3, 4 & Specials
Reeder is played by Chris Addison (pictured in 2017) Reeder is a special adviser to Hugh Abbot and his replacement, Nicola Murray. An Oxbridge graduate, he is arrogant but inexperienced, and is often inadvertently the cause of departmental mistakes. However, the minister often takes his ideas believing them to be vote-winners. A large part of Ollie's character is his self-centredness and cowardice, being described as "morally bankrupt" and "spineless". In the specials Glenn makes a reference to having originally found Ollie working in Millbank (real life New Labour HQ). Ollie was seconded to 10 Downing Street after he slept with an opposition party worker and was told to use his relationship to gather information on opposition party policy. Ollie remains a special advisor to Nicola Murray following her election to Leader of the Opposition in Series 4 and later joins with Malcolm to force Nicola out as leader. He remained Policy Adviser to Dan Miller, although in a less pivotal role than he had under Hugh or Nicola. At the Goolding Inquiry in episode 4.6, he shifts blame for the leaking of the PFI email to Glenn Cullen, describing his dislike of his job at DoSAC and Nicola as motives. He replaces Malcolm as Director of Communications in episode 4.7. following his resignation, in spite of Malcolm asserting that he would not survive the job. There are subtle hints, at least throughout the fourth series, that Ollie undertakes efforts to undermine Malcolm and accelerate his fall from grace. For instance, he is visibly intrigued by the uncanny amount of knowledge Tucker has about Tickel's medical history, which may or may not reflect on the events of the sixth episode More importantly, in the last episode he surreptitiously leaks Malcolm's impending arrest to the press (this he admits to Dan Miller) and it is implied he does the same with Malcolm's choice of Hackney police station to avoid media exposure, in spite of Tucker's pleas not to.
Rt Hon Cliff Lawton MP	Tim Bentinck	Backbench MP (former Secretary of State for Social Affairs)	Series 1 & Specials
Cliff Lawton is forced to resign as the Secretary of State by Malcolm Tucker in episode 1 of the series. He is later referenced as bearing a grudge against Abbot, although it is unclear if this is simply Malcolm's spin. Bitter about his treatment, he later appears in the specials as Jamie's stalking horse during the leadership contest. Jamie unceremoniously ditches him after Cliff's identity is leaked to Malcolm.
Rt Hon Dan Miller MP	Tony Gardner	Leader of the Opposition (former Deputy Leader of the Opposition, Junior Minister, DSA)	Series 1, 4 & Specials
Miller is played by Tony Gardner (pictured in 2010) Miller managed to perfect the art of the strategic resignation in Episode 1.3. He was thought to be standing as a candidate for party leadership but instead supported Tom Davis. He remains unseen in Series 3, but Miller's "cabal" was said to be gathering momentum against the Prime Minister. In Series 4, Miller is deputy to Nicola Murray, who is Leader of the Party. After Malcolm forces Nicola to resign, Miller becomes the interim leader of the Opposition. He did not appear at the Goolding Inquiry, but at the inquiry it was revealed that he held talks with a team from the junior party of the coalition, which included Fergus Williams and Adam Kenyon, to discuss the possibility of a future coalition and the removal of their party leader.
Rt Hon Geoff Holhurst MP	Rob Edwards	Shadow Cabinet Minister (former Secretary of State for Defence)	Series 2, 4 & Specials
First seen in Episode 4 as Secretary of State for Defence, he resigns following an IT overspend after awarding the department's contract to his son's firm. He reappears during the leadership race where Malcolm refers to him as being "So backbench you've actually fucking fallen off". By series 4 he has become Shadow Secretary of State for an unknown department (presumably Defence) in Nicola Murray's Shadow Cabinet. Holhurst is noted (frequently, by both political allies and opponents) for his small head, though there is no evidence that his head is particularly small.
James "Jamie" McDonald	Paul Higgins	Senior Press Officer, Number 10	Series 2 & Specials
Jamie is Tucker's unofficial second-in-command, part of the "Caledonian mafia" leading the Number 10 press office. He performs a similar role to Malcolm with an even higher level of aggression towards all. Jamie is very similar to Malcolm in his mannerisms; aggressive, foul-mouthed and frequently violent to his workmates, being described as a "psychopath" and the "crossest man in Scotland" by his co-workers. Despite his alienating personality, he seems to be the closest thing Malcolm has to an actual friend, as they are seen talking amicably in some scenes and is the only one who can get away with insulting or standing up to Malcolm. He is, however, strongly implied to be more rudimentary than Malcolm on an intellectual level, a fact of which Malcolm is obviously aware; an example of this is a deleted scene from In the Loop where they discuss the film There Will Be Blood. He seems to hold a particular hatred for Julius Nicholson among his general disdain for all his colleagues. At the end of In the Loop he is seen gleefully assisting Malcolm in leaking a document that could potentially start a transcontinental war with the Middle East without a flicker of conscience. He apparently spent five years training to be a priest, is a heavy smoker, and is an avid fan of Al Jolson (in one scene he is seen threatening Ollie with violence for mocking him). Born in Motherwell, he speaks with a thick Lanarkshire accent. In the series he was only known by his first name, but he was given the surname "McDonald" for his reappearance in In the Loop.
Julius, Rt Hon The Lord Nicholson of Arnage	Alex Macqueen	Life Peer (former 'Blue Skies' Special Adviser, Head of Advanced Implementation Unit, Number 10)	Series 2, 3 & Specials
Nicholson is played by Alex Macqueen (pictured in 2024) Julius Nicholson, ex-business guru, is a softly spoken adviser to the prime minister, similar to the real life Andrew Adonis or John Birt. His close relationship with the PM and blue-sky thinking means he is often in conflict with Tucker. In the Specials, he is in charge of the Prime Minister's Legacy project and claims to know the secret date when the former is going to resign. After Tucker destroys the Legacy project, Nicholson avenges by leaking confidential immigration figures to the press. Later in the series he is given his own department—the Advanced Implementation Unit. He follows cricket and is always, with very few exceptions, shown eating or talking about food, to the point of even using the food he is consuming as a metaphor to bring a message home (e.g. the onion bhaji meant to symbolise the problems brought caused by a negative internal report on the Series 3 crime statistics affair), and is particularly fond of expensive biscuits. His nephew is a day-pupil at Charterhouse. He reappears in Series 3 with a peerage.
Nick Hanway	Martin Savage	Spin Doctor for Tom Davis	Series 2 & Specials
Hanway was the equivalent of Malcolm Tucker for Prime Minister-in-waiting Tom. However, he was made to look disloyal to Tom via a series of schemes implemented by Malcolm in Spinners and Losers. Hanway had considered himself a candidate for the Prime Minister's Director of Communications, but lost out when the job was given to Malcolm again.
Claire Ballentine MP	Eve Matheson	Backbench MP, Chair, Education Select Committee	Series 2 & Specials
Ballentine is the hard-hitting and well-respected Chairwoman of the House of Commons Education Select Committee. She questions Hugh Abbot on the department's SEN schools policy, in Episode 2.3. She was proposed as a candidate for party Leader and Prime Minister in Spinners and Losers, but she declined to stand, owing to a previously unknown online gambling addiction, having registered with gambling websites using her own name. She was mentioned in series 4, having been told to appear for an interview after Nicola Murray's resignation. She also appears in the end credits of In the Loop where she is being promoted.
Ben Swain MP	Justin Edwards	Backbench MP (former Shadow Cabinet Minister, Minister of State at the Department of Education, Minister of State for Immigration, DoSAC)	Series 3, 4 & Specials
Swain is a supporter of leadership candidate Tom Davis (a "nutter") and is therefore viewed with suspicion by other characters supportive of the current party faction heading the government. He was proven to be an embarrassment on television when faced with Jeremy Paxman on Newsnight, where he blinked excessively and failed to answer any questions coherently. He has written a book about "getting ahead in politics" called It's The Everything, Stupid. In "Spinners and Losers" he was briefly a candidate for party leadership. He was made a Minister at some level in the Department of Education in Davis' government, and has an adversarial relationship with Nicola Murray, who sacked him as a junior minister from DoSAC in an off-screen incident. In series 4 he has become Shadow Secretary of State for an unknown department in Nicola Murray's Shadow Cabinet. He was forced to resign by Malcolm to put in motion events leading to Nicola's resignation as Leader of the Opposition when promised the post of Shadow Chancellor. He returned to the backbenches when Malcolm found evidence that he, along with Nicola, briefly favoured a controversial policy that led to the suicide of a nurse, Mr. Tickel. Swain is often shown eating or searching for confectionery products. It is mentioned that he studied History of Art at university. Justin Edwards appeared in the spin off Veep, although his character is not named.
Ed Atkins	Rory Kinnear	Press Officer, Number 10	Series 3
Ed is a press officer in the Number 10 communications unit, answering to Malcolm, who appears in episode 3.1.
John Duggan	Miles Jupp	Party Press Officer	Series 3 & 4
Duggan is played by Miles Jupp (pictured in 2017) An inept press officer prone to making inappropriate comments, whose big fringe is supposedly there to "hide the lobotomy scars." He appears at the party conference in Series 3 and in Series 4 onboard a train to the "Here2Hear" event in Bradford, minding a Sky News film crew, who were conducting an interview with Nicola Murray. Recently divorced, he unsuccessfully tries to flirt with Helen, Nicola's advisor.
Rt Hon Steve Fleming MP	David Haig	Backbench MP (former Chief Whip; Acting Director of Communications, Number 10)	Series 3
Appears in Episode 3.7 as the PM's new passive-aggressive, creepy enforcer while Malcolm is "on holiday". He is referred to as the man "who brought us back into power" by Ollie, and may be based on Peter Mandelson, although with a very different personality. Fleming manages to force Malcolm's resignation over an attempt to fix a crime statistics inquiry and, by the following episode, has taken over Malcolm's role at Number 10. However, Malcolm's machinations eventually lead to Julius Nicholson clearing Malcolm of wrongdoing in the crime statistics inquiry, while blaming it all on Fleming, forcing Fleming to resign after less than a week in office. His last known act was attempting to join Dan Miller's cabal. He was mentioned in Episode 4.4, having given an interview to a newspaper declaring that Nicola Murray was "unelectable". This event signalled the start of Malcolm's plan to force out Nicola as Leader of the Opposition.
Helen Hatley	Rebecca Gethings	Special Adviser to Nicola Murray (former Special Adviser to the Leader of the Opposition)	Series 4
Helen is Nicola's special adviser, brought in to replace Glenn Cullen, after he defects to the "Inbetweeners". She was always Nicola's first choice as a special adviser, but only joined her team once she became Leader. She is sceptical of Malcolm, and even makes the mistake of questioning his loyalty to the party. She remains as Special Adviser to Nicola Murray after her resignation as Leader. Little is known about her private life aside from a past affair with a married producer on the Daily Politics, which is mentioned in passing by Nicola in episode 4. Gethings appeared in the spin off Veep, although her character is not named. She appears at a gathering where the Deputy Prime Minister and Vice President meet.
Sam Cassidy	Samantha Harrington	Personal Assistant to Malcolm Tucker	Series 1, 2, 3, 4 & Specials
Malcolm Tucker's personal assistant and secretary, and often witness to many of his profanity-laden rants. Mostly appears in the backgrounds of episodes but occasionally interacts with the main cast. She is one of the few people who actually likes Tucker and is visibly upset when he gets the sack; for his part, Tucker seems to have genuine affection (by his standards) for her. Though not technically a party hack, she moves with Tucker after the election, continuing as his assistant now in opposition. She appears among the audience during all sessions of the Goolding Inquiry in Series 4, Episode 6, and her facial expression throughout the process evolves into visible concern by the latter half as she witnesses both an effective end to Malcolm's career and the beginning of his legal troubles. As with Tucker, Sam also appears in In the Loop.

=== Civil Service ===
Name	Actor	Role(s)	Duration
Teresa Jessica "Terri" Coverley	Joanna Scanlan	Director of Communications, DoSAC	Series 1, 2, 3, 4 & Specials
Coverley is played by Joanna Scanlan (pictured in 2019) Notionally responsible for press relations at DoSAC, Coverley was headhunted from supermarket chains Sainsbury's and Waitrose, where she was once Head of Press. She has also worked in the press office at Sainsbury's. Professional but prudish, she is often left to "mop up" the bad press garnered by the department. She is reluctant to do anything outside of the remit of her job and resents staying late. She has a sister who lives in Hastings. By the time series 4 begins, she wants to be made redundant so she can get away from the Coalition, and plans to use her redundancy money in order to take over a teashop in Ludlow. She is married with a daughter, and during series 4 is reportedly trying to get her dog on Britain's Got Talent. She and Glenn Cullen were responsible for the leaking of an email containing comments from DoSAC staff on Douglas Tickel, a homeless nurse who eventually killed himself, although the emails were provided to Glenn by Fergus Williams and Adam Kenyon. At the Goolding Inquiry in episode 4.6, her arrogance and delusion is highlighted, when she states her belief that Nicola Murray was jealous of her (as are most women according to her), that she has a very good professional and personal relationship with Peter Mannion (in truth he cannot stand to be around her, and made a scene when he discovered she was not on the list for redundancy), describing herself as quite popular and Robyn Murdoch as "weak". She was also referred to as a "blockage" by several DoSAC staff at the inquiry, though she believed they meant "buffer". On his departure from DoSAC in episode 4.7., Glenn told her that although he pitied her, he had never met anyone "so proud and yet quite so useless".
Robyn Murdoch	Polly Kemp	Senior Press Officer, DoSAC (former Acting Director of Communications, DoSAC)	Series 2, 3, 4 & Specials
Despite her job title, Robyn is Terri's secretary, and despite being Acting Director of Communications during Terri's absence, she is largely ignored by the minister, Hugh Abbot, who was initially under the mistaken belief that she was an unknown secretary to a man called "Robin". Invited to attend Malcolm Tucker's 8:30am briefings, Julius Nicholson had her disinvited, and she ended up killing time in St James' Park in order that Abbot does not realise they are no longer represented at the 8:30 meetings. Well-meaning, but politically naive, she is often sent to do menial tasks, such as photocopying and making tea, especially when Terri returns in the last episode of Series 2. She finds both Malcolm and his understudy, Jamie McDonald, particularly terrifying. Because she, like Terri, is a civil servant, she now works for the coalition. In episode 4.5 Fergus is unsure why she is still at DoSAC because he had her on the top of his redundancy list, but puts her in charge of looking after the young care workers while everyone else is trying to lay the blame of Douglas Tickel's death and hacking on someone else. At the Goolding Inquiry in episode 4.6 she describes the extent to which staff have bullied her at DoSAC, freely admits that she and Terri do not get on, and expressed incredulity at Terri's delusional comments about the two of them. She believes that her political masters do not actually have any big plan, but rather "they're just trying to get through the day without cocking up". Her mother has an alcohol problem that is now common knowledge due to Robyn talking about it at the inquiry.

=== The Opposition (Specials–Series 3) / Coalition Government (Series 4) ===
Name	Actor	Role(s)	Duration
Rt Hon Peter Mannion MP	Roger Allam	Secretary of State for Social Affairs and Citizenship (formerly Shadow Secretary of State for Social Affairs and Citizenship; Minister for Fisheries, DEFRA)	Series 3, 4 & Specials
Mannion is played by Roger Allam (pictured in 2009) The sarcastic, cynical, old-fashioned and curmudgeonly Shadow Minister who serves as a counterpart for Nicola Murray, and one of the "old guard" of Opposition MPs, Peter was "around in the 80s" (he is a self-described "One Nation party guy") and is thus very resistant to spin doctor Stewart Pearson's new management jargon style of public relations. Mannion is marginally more charismatic and media-savvy than Nicola, however he is nevertheless prone to gaffes, often appearing out of touch and elitist. He antagonises Pearson by refusing to accept his advice and his "no tie" policy. Mannion challenged the modernising party leader, JB, in his party's leadership election, which Mannion believes is the reason for Stewart's poor treatment of him. Mannion was dubbed "Cheater Mannion" by the press during a sex scandal with a former researcher during the mid-1990s and once served as a Junior Minister at DEFRA, responsible for fisheries. He displays a greater reluctance than most in the Opposition to use personal information against the Government, demonstrated by his refusal to use a story concerning Murray's daughter. By series 4 he has become the Secretary of State at DoSAC. Married to Tina, it is mentioned that he studied Classics at university, and is 54 in 2012. He is one of the very few who is not intimidated at all by Malcolm Tucker and even trades witty insults with him in one of their few meetings. He warns Alastair Leyton (a senior executive at The Times) that Mr. Tickel's medical records had been leaked. It is left to the audience to decide whether this phone call is a deliberate attempt to undermine Tucker; Mannion tells Leyton that Mr. Tickel was a victim of "Mr Blag", but it is left unclear whether this is a generic personification of the culture of leaking, or an epithet of Tucker. He is extremely pleased when he learns of Stewart's dismissal. His character combines elements of several veteran Conservative politicians such as Kenneth Clarke, Michael Ancram and David Davis, the last of which Allam has suggested was the model.
Dr Stewart Pearson	Vincent Franklin	Former Director of Communications, Cabinet Office (formerly Opposition Director of Communications)	Series 3, 4 & Specials
The eco-friendly, media-savvy, new-school spin man for the opposition, from Leeds and divorced three times. While Stewart is forceful and manipulative, his style is very different from Tucker, as he dislikes raising his voice and talks mainly in buzzwords and jargon. This greatly aggravates Peter Mannion, who refuses to take Stewart seriously. Pearson therefore often struggles to exert control and influence over Mannion and often employs passive aggression against him. Tucker has demonstrated an ability to negotiate with him when it would be beneficial for both parties. One example of this is when Tucker and Pearson agree to abandon Nicola Murray and Peter Mannion during a disastrous Radio 5 Live discussion, as both acknowledge that they are "too incompetent" to be worth saving. Stewart is openly afraid of his boss, Cal Richards, and does his best to avoid him. By series 4 he has replaced Malcolm as the Government's Director of Communications, although he is left in shock when the Prime Minister JB has an underling tell him that a policy has been dropped, realising that his influence has begun to decline. At the Goolding Inquiry he found it hard to speak in plain English and without buzzwords and denied ever leaking himself. Stewart was fired as Director of Communications in episode 4.7. and sent to a think tank, the PM being keener on actions rather than thoughts. Following this news, Stewart declared that, despite cleansing some sexist and homophobic aspects, his attempts to detoxify the party were always doomed. Pearson holds a PhD. Franklin has described him as being based on Steve Hilton, a former director of strategy for David Cameron.
Fergus Williams MP	Geoffrey Streatfeild	Minister of State for Social Affairs, DoSAC	Series 4
Junior Minister and representative of the junior "Inbetweener" Coalition party at DoSAC. Adam Kenyon and Glenn Cullen serve as his advisors. Ambitious and bad-tempered, Fergus spends most of his time clashing with Secretary of State Peter Mannion (whom he sees as "outdated and irrelevant") over who gets credit for policies . This also brings him into conflict with Stewart Pearson, who is overseeing all aspects of government policy, often at the expense of the "Inbetweeners". He formerly worked for npower in communications for two years. At the Goolding Inquiry in episode 4.6 it was revealed that he and Adam were part of a team that met with Dan Miller to talk about a potential future coalition with Miller's party and the removal of his own party leader. Glenn Cullen described Fergus in his departure speech as having lost his principles since entering government and having no real power, despite Fergus' protests.
Emma Florence Messinger	Olivia Poulet	Special Adviser to the Secretary of State, DoSAC (formerly Policy Adviser to the Shadow Secretary of State)	Series 3, 4 & Specials
Emma was Ollie's girlfriend, shamelessly used by him for Tucker's ends, but she also often steals ideas and policies from him and takes the credit. Peter is somewhat averse to her presence in his department, since she is a key ally to Stewart. This often brings her into conflict with Phil, who Emma dislikes despite sharing a flat with him for a time. Glenn Cullen described her on his departure as being nothing more than a "standard issue insipid posh bitch".
Philip Bartholomew Cornelius "Phil" Smith	Will Smith	Special Adviser to the Secretary of State, DoSAC (formerly Researcher for the Shadow Secretary of State)	Series 3, 4 & Specials
In the department, Phil is very much Peter's man, to the point where he even writes the former's blog. Phil formerly shared a flat with Emma, (although they are not great friends), and Emma's brother Affers (David Dawson). He and Ollie are immensely antagonistic towards each other, although almost everybody Phil meets considers him to be a childish idiot. He often makes analogies to Tolkien's The Lord of the Rings books and later the Game of Thrones TV series. He considers himself to be a world expert on Peter Mannion, from "inside leg measurements to PIN number". Phil admits in episode 4.5 that he has not had sex in five years, and that he does not really enjoy it. Glenn Cullen described Phil in his departure speech as a "closet Regency homosexual" and an "eight-year-old trapped in a twelve-year-old's body". Phil took it in his stride, wondering why no-one was recording it.
Glenn Cullen (Sometimes 'Glen')	James Smith	Former Adviser, Fourth Sector Initiative; Special Adviser to the Minister of State, DoSAC (formerly Senior Special Adviser to the Secretary of State, DoSAC)	Series 1, 2, 3, 4 & Specials
Glenn Cullen was Hugh's chief adviser and friend. He appeared on ITN after swearing at a member of the public who confronts Abbot. In the transition he managed to remain as Senior Advisor when Nicola Murray becomes Secretary of State. He fell out with Nicola after she inadvertently thwarted his plan to stand as an MP because his association with her was considered "too divisive". In series 4, he is unhappily working in the Coalition government, having left Nicola and defected to Fergus Williams and Adam Kenyon's "Inbetweener" party after the election, as they were looking for someone to explain the Fourth Sector and their brand of ethical politics was something he could believe in. He was dismayed when he realised his new party were quite prepared to ditch their ideals to enter a coalition with Peter Mannion's party (whom Glenn had "spent his whole career trying to keep out" in his old party). He is mostly ignored by Fergus and Adam and bitterly reflects that there is no-one like him left at the department now. He naturally jumps at the chance to help Malcolm bring down Nicola as Leader of the Opposition, leaking an old email that showed her support of a controversial policy that resulted in the suicide of Douglas Tickel, while she was Secretary of State at DoSAC. Despite this, he was not allowed to return to his former party and was still regarded by Malcolm as a traitor. At the Goolding Inquiry in episode 4.6 he denounced Ollie Reeder as "spineless" and "without conviction", publicly apologising for bringing him into politics. He also lied about his involvement in the leaking of emails that led to Murray's resignation. Glenn resigned as Advisor for the Fourth Sector Initiative in episode 4.7, giving a speech to the staff of DoSAC on how much he disliked them. He intended to hand himself to the police for perjuring himself in the inquiry, but decided against it when he saw the door to the police station was closed. Despite all this, Glenn, along with Nicola Murray and Peter Mannion, are the only principal characters who are ever motivated by their conscience, rather than purely by self-interest.
Adam Kenyon	Ben Willbond	Special Adviser to the Minister of State, DoSAC (formerly Night Editor, Daily Mail)	Series 4 and Specials
Kenyon is played by Ben Willbond (pictured in 2011) The put-upon night editor is seen in "Spinners and Losers", desperately attempting to write a coherent editorial from the conflicting stories leaking from Westminster. He eventually decides to write a piece about the "Night of Spin", naming those who have annoyed him as the night's "losers". In series 4 he is revealed to be in "the Inbetweener" party and works in DoSAC as Special Advisor to Fergus Williams. At the Goolding Inquiry in episode 4.6 it was revealed that he and Fergus were part of a team that met with Dan Miller to talk about a potential future coalition with Miller's party and the removal of his own party leader. Glenn Cullen described him in his departure speech as "loathsome" and "most suited to working at the Daily Mail", a view that Emma and Phil also share.
Cal Richards	Tom Hollander	Chief Election Strategist, Opposition Party	Series 3
Richards is played by Tom Hollander (pictured in 2007) Stewart's fearsome boss, nicknamed "The Fucker" by his colleagues, who is much more like Tucker in his style, only even more aggressive and profane. Emma describes him as "pure poison". In his brief appearance he appears uncouth, screaming wanton abuse at the policy team and threatening to sack Stewart. His violent aggression has gained him legendary status in DoSAC, and he is perhaps the only person in government more feared than Malcolm.
Mary Drake MP	Sylvestra Le Touzel	Minister of State, Cabinet Office (former Home Office Minister)	Series 4
Drake is played by Sylvestra Le Touzel (pictured in 2014) Mary first appears in episode 4.3, at Stewart's "thought camp" bank holiday retreat where she is one of only two senior ministers present (the other being Peter Mannion). She has a son, who at the time is on a school trip. She later reappears in episode 4.7., expressing displeasure with DoSAC over the police backlog. She replaced Stewart as Director of Communications.

=== Media ===
Name	Actor	Role(s)	Duration
Angela Heaney	Lucinda Raikes	Junior Political Correspondent, Daily Mail, formerly Evening Standard	Series 1, 2, 3 & Specials
As Ollie Reader's ex-girlfriend, Angela Heaney is often called in when the department wants to leak a story. However, due to Ollie's comparative lack of influence, she often ends up being misinformed. Initially working for the Evening Standard, she becomes less of a soft touch when she moves to the Daily Mail. A journalist played by Raikes, presumably Angela Heaney, also appears in In the Loop, and Tucker mentions an incident involving Heaney near the beginning of the film.
Simon Hewitt	Matthew Marsh	Journalist	Series 1
Simon Hewitt authors a particularly scathing column about Hugh Abbot accusing him of being totally out of touch with his constituents. This drives most of the action in Episode 2 and reveals a strong personal animosity between Hewitt and Malcolm Tucker. The reasons for this, mostly left open to speculation in the final cut, are explained to Ollie by Terri in one of the deleted scenes: Hewitt's current girlfriend, BBC health correspondent Kelly Grogan, had been Malcolm's girlfriend until about three months earlier.
Marianne Swift	Zoe Telford	Freelance Journalist	Series 3
Marianne overhears Nicola telling journalists "off the record" about deleted immigration figures at The Guardian offices after a lunch. She works occasionally for the Daily Mail and appeared in Malcolm's flat as a dinner guest with Geoffrey. Nicola Murray referred to her as "swine-faced Swift".
Geoffrey	Peter Sullivan	Editor, The Guardian	Series 3
Geoffrey is the Editor of The Guardian and present at a lunch attended by Nicola and Malcolm. He later appears at the party conference and then at Malcolm's home when he holds a meal for journalists. In series 4, he received a chain of emails leaked by Glenn Cullen and Terri Coverley that contained insensitive comments from DoSAC staff on Douglas Tickel, a homeless nurse who eventually committed suicide.
Declan (aka "Mr Chop")	Michael Colgan	Tabloid Journalist	Series 4
Declan is a tabloid journalist who dresses up as a giant pork chop and publicly harasses Nicola Murray, suggesting that she is going to "get the chop", i.e. be sacked as Leader of the Opposition.

=== Goolding Inquiry ===
Name	Actor	Role(s)	Duration
Lord Goolding	William Hoyland	Inquiry Judge	Series 4
Lord Goolding is a member of the Goolding Inquiry that was formed to investigate the death of homeless nurse Douglas Tickel and the "culture of leaking" between political parties and the media. The inquiry required several key individuals from the government, the Opposition and the Civil Service to attend and give evidence. Lord Goolding is reputedly a fair man, but he is not going to stand for any nonsense or anyone trying to use the inquiry to score political points. He has a desire for plainness and clarity. During the trial, it is implied that Goolding had an affair and used a superinjunction, jokingly referred to by Malcolm Tucker.
Baroness Sureka	Priyanga Burford	Inquiry Judge	Series 4
Baroness Sureka is a member of the Goolding Inquiry that was formed to investigate the death of homeless nurse Douglas Tickel and the "culture of leaking" between political parties and the media. The inquiry required several key individuals from the government, the Opposition and the Civil Service to attend and give evidence. During the inquiry, a personal story about her appeared in the Sunday Times, after she started probing Malcolm Tucker's bullying tactics. After this she did not appear for several days during the inquiry.
Simon Weir	Tobias Menzies	Inquiry Judge	Series 4
Simon Weir is a member of the Goolding Inquiry that was formed to investigate the death of homeless nurse Douglas Tickel and the "culture of leaking" between political parties and the media. The inquiry required several key individuals from the government, the Opposition and the Civil Service to attend and give evidence.
Matthew Hodge	Michael Maloney	Inquiry Judge	Series 4
Matthew Hodge is a member of the Goolding Inquiry that was formed to investigate the death of homeless nurse Douglas Tickel and the "culture of leaking" between political parties and the media. The inquiry required several key individuals from the government, the Opposition and the Civil Service to attend and give evidence.

=== Unseen characters ===
Name	Actor	Role(s)	Duration
The PM	Unseen	Prime Minister of the United Kingdom	Series 1, 2 & Specials
The first unseen Prime Minister of the series, it is learned that he is obsessed with leaving a "legacy" from his time in office. Julius Nicholson states that he once tried to have the chief examiner sacked over his son's retake marks. He is a parody of Tony Blair.
Rt Hon Tom Davis MP	Unseen	Prime Minister of the United Kingdom (formerly Chancellor)	Series 1, 2, 3 & Specials
Tom succeeds to the premiership during the Specials, having been the likely successor to the previous PM for some time, gathering a large following in the party referred to as the "Nutters". His succession is nearly derailed after Jamie leaked rumours that Tom has bouts of depression and takes anti-depressants. His premiership witnesses the slow decline of this government. He is a parody of Gordon Brown.
JB	Unseen	Prime Minister of the United Kingdom (formerly Leader of the Opposition)	Series 3, 4 & Specials
JB, who is only ever referred to by his initials, is the young, inexperienced, upper-class Leader of the Opposition in the Specials and Series 3. JB is a modernist and has hired Stewart Pearson to change his party's seemingly old-fashioned, backward image and broaden its appeal, which irritates members of the party old guard, such as Peter Mannion. He is reluctant to commit to firm policies before the election. According to Mannion, he and the members of his "Eton clique," despite ostensibly heading up the progressive wing of the party, enjoy texting offensive jokes to each other, something Stewart dismisses as "ironising". In Series 4, JB is now Prime Minister in a Coalition government that is overseeing austerity measures (referred to by Malcolm Tucker as "JB's barmy army"). He is a parody of David Cameron.
"Fatty"	Unseen	MP, former Minister of State for Defence	Series 2, 3, 4 & Specials
"Fatty" is an MP who holds a ministerial post in the Ministry of Defence, though survives the reshuffle at the start of Series 3. He is not held in particularly high regard by Malcolm or Jamie at Number 10, and is only referred to by his weight, having been rewarded with a hamper by Malcolm in Series 4. He evidently remains a senior figure within the party. Immediately after Nicola's resignation, however, Malcolm orders Ollie to show Fatty a picture (not shown on-screen but deemed extremely upsetting by Ollie) as a form of blackmail to ensure he shelves the leadership ambitions he still held up to that point.
Pat Morrissey	Unseen	Opposition Communications (formerly Communications, Number 10)	Series 2, 3, 4 & Specials
Pat, referred to with epithets about her weight, such as "Fat Pat" or "Pumpkin Tits", plays a publicity or communications role with the office of the Prime Minister. It is not clear exactly what her position is, but she is a frequent competitor with Malcolm for power and influence within the party. Formerly worked for ITN, before becoming a "Nutter", a supporter of Tom Davis within the Number 10 press office. She remains part of the party communications team during Series 4, moving to the Norman Shaw Buildings.
Douglas Tickel	Unseen	Nurse	Series 4
Douglas Tickel was a nurse that became homeless after his key worker housing was sold off and he refused alternative accommodation. He took up residence in a tent as a protest against the policy, committing suicide in episode 4.3. Tickel had intense mental health issues that became evident after the leaking of his confidential medical records. After Glenn and Terri's leak in episode 4.5, the media gains hold of a chain of offensive emails from members of the Government targeted towards Tickel's mental troubles, including such quotes such as "the fucker's a nutbag" from Emma. His death and the illegal leaking of his medical records later sparked the Goolding Inquiry into the "culture of leaking".
