= Harbour Lights (TV series) =

Television series

- Genre: Drama
- Created by: David Martin
- Starring: Nick Berry; Tina Hobley; Gerard Horan; Matilda Ziegler; Tim Matthews; Freddie Davies; Emma Pike; Francis Pope; Paola Dionisotti; Louis Mahoney; Liam Tattershall
- Country of origin: United Kingdom
- Original language: English
- No. of series: 2
- No. of episodes: 16

Production
- Executive producer: Steve Lanning
- Producer: Mal Young
- Production locations: West Bay, Bridport
- Running time: 50 minutes
- Production company: BBC Scotland

Original release
- Network: BBC One
- Release: 18 February 1999 – 28 May 2000

Harbour Lights is a British television drama series, broadcast on BBC One, that ran for two series from 18 February 1999 to 28 May 2000. It stars Nick Berry as protagonist Mike Nicholls, a former Royal Navy officer who returns to his childhood town of Bridehaven to take on the role of harbourmaster. The first series features storylines including a blossoming romance with local constable Melanie Rush (Tina Hobley), the ruthless business dealings of Tony Simpson (Gerard Horan), and the inter-family feuding of the Blades — Steve, George, Jason, Kelly and Rita. Both series were predominantly filmed in West Bay near Bridport in Dorset, which acts as the fictional town of Bridehaven. The second series features much harder-hitting storylines than the first, and was criticised by local residents for portraying West Bay in a bad light.

The complete series was released on Region 4 DVD on 3 March 2011. This is the only commercial release of the series available. The second episode of the first series, "Marie [sic] Celeste", was famously said to be "missing" and was never broadcast on the BBC. It has, however, been shown during repeat screenings of the series on digital television, and is included in the DVD release.

== Filming locations ==
Locations used for filming in the series include:

- Bridehaven Harbour Master's Office – West Bay (Bridport) Harbour Master's Office (series 1 and 2);
- Bridehaven Carnival – Bridport Carnival (series 1, episode 1);
- Bridehaven Trawler and Speedboat Race – West Bay Trawler Parade (series 1, episode 1);
- Bridehaven Torchlight Procession – Bridport to West Bay Torchlight Procession (series 1, episode 2);
- Sea View Restaurant – Riverside Restaurant (series 1);
- The Pier's Hotel – Bridport Arms Hotel (series 1);
- Bridehaven Arms – Bridport Arms Public House (series 1 and 2);
- Pink Cottage on East Beach – Harbour Master's Residence (series 1, up to episode 4);
- Cottage attached to Bridport Arms (on left) – Harbour Master's Residence (series 1, episode 5 onwards);
- Parents' residence of dead colleague of Harbour Master – The Cottage, Third Cliff Walk (series 1, up to episode 4);
- Blade family residence – Cottage in George Street (next to George Hotel) (series 1 and 2);
- Quayside Amusements – Harbour Amusements (series 1 and 2);
- Harbour Café – Harbour Café (series 1);
- George's Café – Harbour Café (series 2);
- St John's Church (series 1 and 2);
- Highlands End Holiday Park – (series 1, episode 4);
- Bridehaven Village Hall – Lyric Theatre in Barrack Street, Bridport (series 1, episode 5);
- The Fleet and Abbotsbury Swannery – (series 1, episode 6);
- Charmouth Beach – (series 1, episode 8);
- Bridehaven Police Station – Bridport Police Station, Barrack Street (series 2, now Peeler's Court);
- Bridehaven Community Hospital – Bridport Community Hospital (series 2, episode 2);
- Bridehaven Caravan Park – West Bay Holiday Park (series 2, episode 4);
- Bosterman Caves – Beer Quarry Caves (series 2, episode 6);
- Bridehaven Football Club – Bridport Football Club (series 2, episode 6); and
- Heymouth – Weymouth (series 1 and 2).

== Cast ==
- Nick Berry as Lt. Comm. Mike Nicholls (Series 1–2)
- Tina Hobley as WPC/DC Melanie Rush (Series 1–2)
- Gerard Horan as Tony Simpson (Series 1–2)
- Tim Matthews as Steve Blade (Series 1–2)
- Freddie Davies as George Blade (Series 1–2)
- Matilda Ziegler as Jane Ford (Series 1, Episodes 1–10)
- Paola Dionisotti as Bella "Aunt" Nicholls (Series 1, Episodes 1–10)
- Louis Mahoney as Elvis (Series 1, Episodes 1–10)
- Francis Pope as Jason Blade (Series 1, Episodes 1–10)
- Liam Tattershall as Jake Ford (Series 1, Episodes 1–10)
- Emma Pike as Kelly Blade (Series 1, Episodes 1–6, 8–10)
- Margot Leicester as Rita Blade (Series 1, Episodes 1–5, 7 and 10)
- Gillian Raine as Nancy Ford (Series 1, Episodes 1–5)
- Daniel Ryan as P.C. Raymond Busby (Series 1, Episodes 5, 8 and 9)

== Episode list ==
=== Series overview ===
| Series | Episodes | Originally released | |
| Series | Episodes | First released | Last released |
|---|---|---|---|
| 1 | 10 | 18 February 1999 | 15 April 1999 |
| 2 | 6 | 24 April 2000 | 28 May 2000 |

=== Series 1 (1999) ===
| No. | Title | Directed by | Written by | Original release date | UK viewers (millions) |
|---|---|---|---|---|---|
| 1 | "For Those in Peril" | Keith Boak | Lizzie Mickery | 18 February 1999 | 10.91 |
A tragic diving accident claims the life of Pete Ford, a close friend and colleague of former Royal Navy officer Mike Nicholls (Nick Berry). Having accepted the job of harbourmaster, Mike returns to the town where he grew up, Bridehaven. He hopes his new job will help him put his past behind him, but Pete's grieving family aren't quite ready to let the dust settle. Meanwhile, Jason Blade (Francis Pope) has a score to settle with Mike. Angry that Mike took possession of his dog after rescuing it from drowning in Bridehaven harbour, Jason sets out to get him back. Jason's brother, Steve (Tim Matthews), manages to stop him and inadvertently winds up with the job of deputy harbourmaster. As the town's annual summer regatta gets underway, under the watchful eye of scheming businessman Tony Simpson (Gerard Horan), Jake Ford (Liam Tatershall), Pete's seven-year-old nephew, climbs aboard a speedboat unaware that it is about to take part in a race. As Jake finds himself at the mercy of the sea, it's up to Mike and Steve to save him.
| 2 | "Marie [sic] Celeste" | Keith Boak | Lizzie Mickery | Unaired | N/A |
Aunt Nicholls (Paola Dionisotti) is looking forward to the arrival of Paddy (David Ross), a fertiliser salesman who sails into Bridehaven every three months, with whom she has been having an affair. Meanwhile, an abandoned yacht in the water just outside Bridehaven harbour triggers an investigation by Mike and Melanie (Tina Hobley). When they discover the vessel belonged to Paddy, Mike organises a major search involving the police and the coastguard. As they attempt to map out Paddy's route from Heymouth to Bridehaven, Mike notices that a key to a room in Auntie's guest house has disappeared. He discovers that Paddy has been secretly hiding away in the room in an attempt to make people believe he has died at sea. Auntie begs Mike not to reveal the truth, and so he and Melanie press on with their investigation regardless. However, after tracing a bunch of flowers sent to Auntie the day before his arrival, they discover evidence to suggest that Paddy is already a bigamist, with two secret wives hidden away in Heymouth.
| 3 | "Prince Charming" | Tim Dowd | Edward Canfor-Dumas | 25 February 1999 | 8.93 |
Mike is alarmed by the behaviour of an ex-chief petty officer and Falklands veteran, Alan Semple (Nicholas Ball), who descends on Bridehaven with a group of school young sea cadets for training. Mike is particularly concerned for the safety of young cadet Joanna Ellis (Elisa De Grey), who appears to be the constant target of Semple's ridicule. Meanwhile, it's Jane's last night in Bridehaven, and she decides to offer Mike the chance to rekindle their relationship, by accompanying him to the harbourmaster association's annual ball. Mike, however, has other plans and decides to invite Melanie as his guest. Back in Bridehaven, Rita's court date has arrived, and as a gloating Simpson watches on from the gallery, she is sentenced to three months in jail, suspended for two years. Jason isn't happy with the verdict, and vows to get revenge on Simpson. Kelly's attempt to lure cadet Richard away for a night of passion ends in disaster when he is caught red-handed by Semple – but his punishment for being disobedient leads to a tragic accident.
| 4 | "Dead Ends" | Tim Dowd | Stephen Clarke | 4 March 1999 | 7.94 |
A suicidal holidaymaker, Arthur Denton (Roy Hudd), arrives in Bridehaven, hankering to find a town that no longer exists. Mike decides to put him under the watchful eye of Aunt Nicholls, and slowly, the story of his arrival in the town which provided the backdrop for a tragic honeymoon thirty years ago begins to unfold. Having decided to stick around in Bridehaven, Jane accepts an offer from employment from Tony Simpson (Gerard Horan) at his seaside bingo hall. Dismayed at the lack of clientele, she decides to spice things up with an exciting revamp. Rita takes the blame for Jason's drunken antics, after he telephones Simpson's confectionery factory with a hoax bomb threat, despite the fact that it could put her behind bars for a long time. Mike's relationship with Melanie continues to blossom, but as Arthur's behaviour becomes more and more erratic, Mike decides to concoct a plan to allow Arthur to carry out his wish. George is distraught at the loss of his beloved Rita, but Jason refuses to own up to his part in the hoax.
| 5 | "Baywatch" | Gary Love | Gil Brailey | 11 March 1999 | 6.30 |
A Rastafarian birdwatcher, Cordell Johnson (Paul Barber), ruffles a few feathers among the twitchers drawn to Bridehaven by the sighting of a rare specimen. Elvis (Louis Mahoney) is suspicious of Cordell's motives, and initially takes a disliking to him. Aunt Nicholls, however, is delighted at Cordell's arrival, having finally found a salsa partner for the local finals. Meanwhile, Mike receives word that a narcotics drop is due to take place in the harbour any day soon. Suspecting that Cordell may be involved, he decides to keep a close eye on him. As Rita's prison sentence begins, George is forced to take control of a wayward Jason. Mike misses a dinner date with Melanie, and is shocked to learn that she is contemplating a transfer to Hartlepool. With both Jane and Melanie vying for his affections, Mike finds himself distracted and unwittingly manages to rebuff both of them. As he realises that Cordell's birdwatching venture has been the cover for the dealers to plan the drop, he and Cordell make the decision to capture them red handed.
| 6 | "Muckraker" | Gary Love | David Martin | 18 March 1999 | 7.23 |
Tony's latest land deal – a bid to purchase a stretch of the coastline known as 'Paradise' – is scuppered by a toxic spillage, which sparks an investigation by Mike and Steve. George is delighted at the news, having turned himself into an eco-warrior and knighted himself the Voice of Bridehaven in an attempt to prevent the deal going through. Tony's business partner Vic (Danny Webb) isn't best pleased about the news, and threatens to back out of the deal. Steve has set his sights on Sophie (Amy Phillips), niece of the local publican. However, his grand gesture to win her over is scuppered by news of another spillage. Meanwhile, Jason's increasingly erratic behaviour begins to set alarm bells ringing. When Steve realises that the harbourmaster's tractor has been used without his consent, he suspects that Jason may somehow be involved in the spillages. As the last of the off-season tourists begin to desert Bridehaven, Elvis closes the cafe and heads up to Hartlepool to help Mel settle into her new flat. Mike invites Jane over for dinner.
| 7 | "The Last Supper" | Terry Bedford | Steve Attridge | 25 March 1999 | 7.09 |
Tony is love struck when his estranged wife, Holly (Kim Thomas), returns home unexpectedly and claims that she wants to get back together with him. Caught in the whirlwind of romance, Tony agrees to Holly's demands to become a partner in a number of his businesses. When Tony makes a public announcement stating his intention to bid for the lease for Elvis' cafe, Mike becomes suspicious and he and Jane join forces to investigate, suspecting that Holly's ultimate aim is to fleece him. When a letter arrives at Tony's offices in the name of Francine Peters, Jane questions Holly over her highly unusual interest in the seemingly incorrectly mailed item. Jane puts her suspicions to one side, until Mike discovers that Francine Peters was an alias being used by Holly when she scammed a former business partner out of £30,000 whilst living in Newcastle. Mike informs Tony, but he initially dismisses the claims, until he discovers that a significant amount of money has been taken from his bank, forcing him to confront a scheming Holly.
| 8 | "Stranded" | Terry Bedford | Stephen Clarke | 1 April 1999 | 7.18 |
Mike devises a plan to relieve the off-season boredom by encouraging locals to practice life saving skills on an inflatable whale, following an incident in West Bay in which a stranded whale died. Meanwhile, Kelly (Emma Pike) has found herself a new boyfriend in the form of local DJ Grainger (Will Mellor). Grainger, however, has a chequered past and a string of criminal convictions for car theft to his name. After convincing Kelly that he has turned a corner, Grainger suggests that they leave Bridehaven to start a new life and pursue Kelly's dreams of becoming a singer. Meanwhile, Jason (Francis Pope) faces up to his responsibilities and decides to visit his mother in prison. As Mike's romance with Jane continues to blossom, Jason becomes concerned over his sister's decision to leave home, and decides to put Grainger to the test to see if he really has put his past behind him. As the newfound environmentalists within the community begin to reignite a sense of long lost community spirit, Kelly's plans come to an abrupt halt.
| 9 | "Highland Fling" | Keith Boak | Gil Brailey | 8 April 1999 | 6.32 |
When an unexpected storm surge hits the waters just outside of Bridehaven, a cargo ship carrying a consignment of vintage Scotch belonging to Tony Simpson is battered, leaving the crew stranded. In an attempt to secure their safety, they ditch the cargo just before being rescued by the coastguard. When the consignment washes up on the beach, Jason (Francis Pope) and George (Freddie Davies) believe they have struck gold and smuggle their stolen loot into a disused barn on the outskirts of town. Tony is furious when he discovers that his cargo has been lost, and becomes determined to track it down with the help of PC Busby (Daniel Ryan). Meanwhile, Jane's ex-boyfriend Philip (Louis Hilyer) turns up with an unexpected proposal: to return with him to London to start a new life. Torn between her feelings for Mike and Philip, Jane looks to Aunt Nicholls for advice. Meanwhile, as Tony is sent on a midnight decoy to Falmouth Cove in the hope of finding his missing loot, the townsfolk jolly up in George's newly refurbished barn.
| 10 | "The Untouchables" | Keith Boak | Lizzie Mickery | 15 April 1999 | 7.31 |
Jane and Philip decide to celebrate their engagement with a party for the whole of Bridehaven. Mike believes that he is powerless to intervene, and contemplates taking a long trip away on his faithful boat. As he makes his plea to Tony for Steve to take over the role of harbourmaster in his absence, Tony decides that Steve must first prove his worth by completing a ten-mile endurance test. Back in Bridehaven, preparations are getting underway for Rita Blade's release from prison. When George gets an unexpected job offer from a friend of Mike, Jason, Steve and Kelly decide to persuade him that it would make the perfect coming home present for her. Having been offered a potential promotion to sergeant, Melanie returns to Bridehaven to take up her former job, much to Mike's delight. As Jane's party gets underway, painful memories are once again brought to the fore when an old friend of her brother's finally reveals the truth about his death. As the night draws to a close, a forlorn Mike hands over to his deputy, and says goodbye to Bridehaven.

=== Series 2 (2000) ===
| No. overall | No. in series | Title | Directed by | Written by | Original release date | UK viewers (millions) |
|---|---|---|---|---|---|---|
| 11 | 1 | "No More Heroes" | Colin Bucksey | Steve Attridge | 24 April 2000 | 8.95 |
Bearded Mike returns from his travels to find that half the inhabitants of Bridehaven have left the town owing to a group of racketeers who have the place gripped in fear. They now own the debt Mike owed for the purchase of his boat. In the end, Mike shaves off his beard.
| 12 | 2 | "Thicker Than Water" | Marcus D.F. White | Gil Brailey | 26 April 2000 | 8.95 |
Mike takes the law into his own hands when Steve is accused of the murder of his wheeler-dealing uncle, Martin. Tensions mount as Mike's jealousy over Melanie's new boss, Nick, threatens to cloud his judgement.
| 13 | 3 | "A Quiet Storm" | Terry Bedford | Paul Mari | 7 May 2000 | 5.92 |
Mike and Melanie are thrown together in a siege when they confront escaped convict Harry Badden and his brothers in an isolated cottage. Charlie has a broken arm and his daughter, Mollt, is diabetic and needing insulin injections.
| 14 | 4 | "The Safe Side" | Justin Hardy | Stephen Clarke | 14 May 2000 | N/A |
Mike falls for a visiting journalist, Sara, but Melanie is uneasy about their fledgling relationship, believing the reporter may be using him to get information for her latest story. Her suspicions are heightened by a series of break-ins. Meanwhile, in a seemingly unconnected incident, a tenant at Tony's caravan site begins an increasingly violent war with him over the provision of facilities. At the same time, a property developer's boat is broken into.
| 15 | 5 | "Storm Damage" | David Hayman | Al Hunter Ashton | 21 May 2000 | 5.52 |
Following a storm, an amnesiac Asian woman is found on the beach. While Steve finds himself falling for her, Mike and Melanie begin to search for the answers to who she is and why she was on a wrecked boat. As the answers emerge, they are left with a race against time to find a group of illegal immigrants who have tuberculosis.
| 16 | 6 | "Rites of Passage" | Peter McDonald | Andrew Rattenbury | 28 May 2000 | N/A |
Mike is thrown into emotional turmoil when the father he has never met returns to Bridehaven. Meanwhile, Tony is supposed to be looking after his nephew and the town's football team, managed by George, has reached the local final.
