= Freezing (TV series) =

2008 British television comedy series

Freezing is a BBC comedy series starring Hugh Bonneville and Elizabeth McGovern about an otherwise successful couple in their forties who find themselves out of work.

== Synopsis ==
Matt (Bonneville) is a publisher who has recently lost his job and Elizabeth (McGovern) is an Oscar-nominated American actress who is having a hard time getting work since moving to live with Matt in London.

Freezing was originally a one-off comedy as part of BBC Four's Tight Spot season in February 2007, which then became the first episode of the series when it aired on BBC Two in February 2008.

Freezing is written by James Wood and directed by Simon Curtis.

== Cast ==
- Hugh Bonneville as Matt
- Elizabeth McGovern as Elizabeth
- Tom Hollander as Leon Blakely
- Ben Miles as Stephen Marshall
- Rebecca Gethings as Kim
- Tim McInnerny as Bamber Jones
- Ruth Wilson as Alison Fennel
- Tom Riley as Dave Beethoven
- Lucinda Raikes as Gloria

== Trivia ==
- Elizabeth McGovern is herself an Oscar-nominated actress who moved to London to live with her husband, Simon Curtis.
- From 2010 to 2015, McGovern and Bonneville worked together again, co-starring in the successful period drama series Downton Abbey as Robert and Cora Crawley, the Earl and Countess of Grantham.
