= Rebecca Gethings =

British actress

- Born: Alberta, Canada
- Education: Webber Douglas Academy of Dramatic Art
- Occupation: Actress
- Years active: 2001–present
- Children: 2
- Website: www.rebeccagethings.com

Rebecca Gethings is a British actress best known for her roles in film and television comedies such as The Thick of It, Extras, The Mimic, David Brent: Life on the Road and Call the Midwife.

== Early life ==
Rebecca Gethings was born in Alberta, Canada, and moved to Berkshire, England, with her family whilst still a child. She trained as an actress at the Webber Douglas Academy of Dramatic Art.

== Career ==
=== Film and television ===
Gethings has collaborated several times with Armando Iannucci, improvising with the US cast of Veep, in which she also appears. Iannucci later cast her as Helen Hatley, the ambitious special adviser to Nicola Murray in the fourth and final series of The Thick of It.

Gethings played Lizzie in episode 4 of 'Extras', directed by Ricky Gervais and Stephen Merchant. In 2016, she worked again with Gervais, playing Miriam, the head of Human Resources in David Brent: Life on the Road.

In 2017, Gethings appeared as Jane in Mad to Be Normal.

In March 2020, she appeared in an episode of the BBC soap opera Doctors as Fran Claverley.

From January 2023, Gethings portrayed Sister Veronica in the twelfth series of BBC period drama Call the Midwife. She later told Radio Times: "I was just blown away by how welcome I was made by the cast. How kind and generous they all were to me, and patient. I love Sister Veronica because she's naughty, and so I hope she gets to do a little bit more naughtiness."

Gethings has voiced a number of animated characters for children's television, advertising campaigns and documentaries. and was the voice of Maiya the Meerkat in the Compare The Market TV advertising campaign.

=== Theatre ===
Gethings' stage work includes The Vegemite Tales at The Venue (2006), Blessie Blatt in Chicken Soup with Barley at the Royal Court Theatre (which was later produced as a radio play for BBC Radio 3, featuring Gethings in the same role) and the West End theatre production of Maxim Gorky's Vassa.

== Personal life ==
Gethings' long time partner is the Emmy award-winning animation director Tom Brass. They have two children. In May 2020, during the COVID-19 lockdown in the United Kingdom, Gethings and her then three-year-old daughter produced a podcast titled Dear Crocodile.

== Filmography ==
=== Television series ===
Year	Title	Role	Notes
2001	EastEnders	Nurse	Episode dated 19 March 2001
2002	Attachments	Ruth Goodman	2 episodes
2004	Comedy Lab	Becca	Series 6 episode 2: Clitheroe
2005	Extras	Lizzie	Series 1 episode 4: Les Dennis
2008	Doctors	Andrea Quigley	Series 10 episode 84
2008–2009	Freezing	Kim	2 episodes
2009	Not Going Out	Dawn	Series 3 episode 2: Winner
2009	The Omid Djalili Show	Beth	1 episode
2010	Dani's House	Miss Batstone	1 episode
2011	Holby City	Rosalind Timms	Series 13 episode 39
2011	Iconicles	Shelly the tortoise	Voice
2011	My Family	Vera	Series 11 episode 11: A Night Out
2012	The Increasingly Poor Decisions of Todd Margaret	Head Juror	1 episode
2012	The Thick of It	Helen Hatley	Series 4; 4 episodes
2012	A Young Doctor's Notebook & Other Stories	Margarita	1 episode
2012	Little Crackers	Mum	1 episode
2013	Drifters	Gabby	Series 1 episode 3: Work Experience
2014	Veep	Bank of England lady	1 episode
2014	The Mimic	Harriet	5 episodes
2014	BBC Comedy Feeds	Aoife	1 episode
2015	Cradle to Grave	Ruby / Woman at dinner dance	1 episode
2016	Love, Nina	Yoga Teacher	1 episode
2017	Quacks	Mrs. Roberts / Estelle Rogers	2 episodes
2018	Doctors	Barbara Buckland	Series 19 episode 154
2019	Shakespeare & Hathaway: Private Investigators	Roamy Cusack	Episode: The Offered Fallacy
2020	There She Goes	Leila	Series 2 episode 3: Headspace
2020	Doctors	Fran Claverley	Series 21 episode 90
2020	Feel Good	Chella Goble	2 episodes
2022	The Serpent Queen	Eleanor of Austria	Series 1; 6 episodes
2022	Breeders	Rheumatologist	Series 3 episode 4: No Body
2023–present	Call the Midwife	Sister Veronica	Series regular

=== Animated shows ===
List of voice performances in animation shows
Year	Title	Role(s)	Notes
2011	The Cat in the Hat Knows a Lot About That!	Katie / Llama / Mort / Polly	UK version

=== Film ===
Year	Title	Role	Notes
2005	The Blind Productions Project	Woman	Short
2006	Casino Royale	Hot Room Technician #2	
2016	David Brent: Life on the Road	Miriam Clark	
2016	The Mayflower Pilgrims: Behind the Myth	Narrator	
2017	Mad to Be Normal	Jane Simons	
2017	You, Me and Him	Biggles Tilsbury	
2018	There Are No Dividends	Claire Brady	Short
2022	Scrooge: A Christmas Carol	Ethel Cratchit / Harty	
2023	The Critic	Joan Harris	
2023	Chicken Run: Dawn of the Nugget	Hens / Factory workers / Lady	Additional voices

=== Podcast series ===
Year	Title	Role(s)	Notes
2013	Iris Wildthyme	Susie Hepcat	Episode: A Lift in Time

=== Video games ===
List of voice performances in video games
Year	Title	Role	Notes
2010	Kinect Sports	Crowds / Announcer	Xbox 360
2018	Vampyr	Mary Reid / Cristina Popa / Charlotte Ashbury / Lottie Paxton / Hsiao Shun / Morrigan / The Red Queen	PlayStation 4
2021	The Forgotten City	Fabia	PlayStation 5
2023	Peppa Pig World Adventures	Mummy Pig	Nintendo Switch
2024	Foamstars	Gwyn's mom	PlayStation 5
2024	Star Wars Outlaws	Jedi fighter / Pilot fighter / troopers	Xbox Series X
