= Jonathan Whitehead =

English musician and composer (1960–2020)

Jonathan Whitehead (21 October 1960 – 26 May 2020) was an English musician and composer, born in Denton, Lancashire. He wrote music for television comedies such as The Day Today, Brass Eye, Black Books, Green Wing, Campus and Nathan Barley. He studied music at the University of Bristol and later lived in London. He sometimes wrote under the name "Trellis".

His music for Green Wing was nominated for a BAFTA and won the RTS Award for Best Original Music. A selection of music from the series was released on CD under Whitehead's artistic nom de plume, Trellis.

Serious documentary and drama scores composed by Whitehead include War In Europe and The Clintons' Marriage of Power for MBC, Metropolis (with James Purefoy), three series of Medics for Granada and Kay Mellor's latest drama series Strictly Confidential for ITV.

He died on 26 May 2020 at the age of 59, with his death being announced the following month by the Radio 4 programme, Last Word.

== Composer ==
The Day Today - (1994)
The Imaginatively Titled Punt & Dennis Show - (1994-95)
Knowing Me Knowing You with Alan Partridge - (1994-95)
Fist of Fun - (1995-96)
The Saturday Night Armistice - (1995-99)
Where's Elvis This Week? - (1996)
Nancy Lam - (1997)
Brass Eye - (1997-2001)
In the Red - (1998)
You Are Here - (1998)
Los Dos Bros - (1999-2001)
Smack the Pony - (1999-2003)
Perfect World - (2000-01)
Metropolis - (2000)
Black Books - (2000-04)
The Estate Agents - (2002)
Peep Show- (2003-) (Jeremy's music)
Green Wing - (2004-2007)
Nathan Barley - (2005)
Twisted Tales - (2005)
Feel the Force - (2006)
Richard Hammond's 5 O'Clock Show - (2006)
The Graham Norton Show - (2007 - )
Strictly Confidential - (2007)
Secret Diary of a Call Girl - (2007)
Moving Wallpaper - (2008)
The Empress's New Clothes - (2008)
Campus - (2009-2011)
Rev. series 1&2 (2010)
Mount Pleasant (8 x 1 hour comedy drama for Tiger aspect/Sky 2011)

== Discography ==
Green Wing: Original Television Soundtrack (as "Trellis") - (2007)

== Awards ==
RTS Craft and Design Award for "Best Original Score" for Green Wing in 2005, and also nominated for a BAFTA.
