= Fairy Tales (TV series) =

British television series

Fairy Tales is a British television drama anthology series produced by Hat Trick Productions for BBC Northern Ireland and broadcast on BBC One. Traditional fairy tales are adapted into modern settings, after the model of ShakespeaRe-Told and The Canterbury Tales. The first episode was broadcast on 10 January 2008, with others following at weekly intervals.

== Episodes ==
=== Rapunzel ===
- Writer: Ed Roe
- Director: Catherine Morshead
- Broadcast: 10 January 2008

Based on the fairytale Rapunzel, Billy Jane Brooke (Charity Wakefield) is a successful tennis player whose nickname is "Rapunzel" because of her long hair. Billy Jane has an overprotective mother-manager (Geraldine James) who surrounds Billy Jane with female bodyguards and prevents her from interacting with men.

Eastern European tennis player Jimmy Stojkovic (Lee Ingleby), who is very bad at the game, is convinced by his father to compete under the guise of a woman, taking the name Martina Stojkovic, so that he has better chances of winning. Billy Jane befriends Jimmy and inspires him to start playing well. Eventually the two begin a "lesbian" relationship, right under the nose of Billy Jane's mother.

Ratings were relatively poor, with only 3.1 million viewers and a 13% audience share.

=== Cinderella ===
- Writers: Anil Gupta and Richard Pinto
- Director: Peter Lydon
- Broadcast: 17 January 2008

Based on the fairytale Cinderella, Cindy Mellor (Maxine Peake) is a cleaner who works at the anthropology wing of a busy university. She has a passion for anthropology, and wants to become the research assistant of Hans Michael Prince (James Nesbitt), a successful celebrity anthropologist. However, the head of the anthropology department, Charlotte Brooks (Harriet Walter), wants one of her own students, either Fenola (Lucy Punch) or Phoebe (Lucinda Raikes) to get the job.

Cindy meets Prince, who doesn't take it well when she challenges his theories. She still wants to try for the job, and under the advice of fellow cleaner Alice (Mona Hammond), Cindy dresses up in one of Fenola's dresses and attends Prince's lecture, hoping to change his mind.

The music is a combination of source tracks and original compositions by Sheridan Tongue.

=== The Empress's New Clothes ===
- Writer: Debbie Horsfield
- Director: Paul Whittington
- Broadcast: 24 January 2008

The episode stars Denise van Outen, Liz White, Rosie Cavaliero, Vincent Franklin, Kenny Doughty and Tobias Menzies. Denise van Outen plays Michaela, a soap opera star with a keen interest in designer fashion.

=== Billy Goat ===
- Writer: Jeremy Dyson.
- Director: Euros Lyn
- Broadcast: 31 January 2008

Starring Bernard Hill, Paul Nicholls, Mathew Horne, Sarah Smart, Nick Mohammed, Holliday Grainger and Moya Brady. The boys in the band Billy Goat have dreams of pastures new but how will their troll manager react? This is the only episode to actually feature any fantasy elements, as it is set in an alternate universe where humans and trolls co-exist.
