= Green Wing =

British TV sitcom (2004–2007)

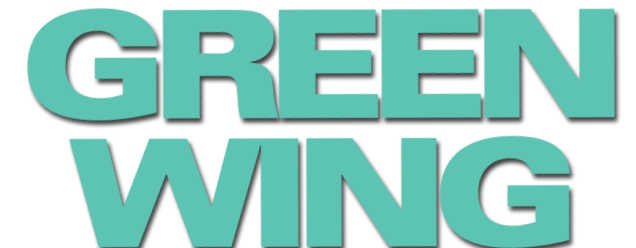
- Genre: Sitcom
- Created by: Victoria Pile
- Starring: Tamsin Greig; Stephen Mangan; Julian Rhind-Tutt; Karl Theobald; Pippa Haywood; Mark Heap; Sarah Alexander; Sally Bretton; Oliver Chris; Olivia Colman; Michelle Gomez; Katie Lyons; Lucinda Raikes; Paterson Joseph; Sally Phillips; Darren Boyd
- Theme music composer: Trellis
- Opening theme: "Last Week"
- Country of origin: United Kingdom
- Original language: English
- No. of series: 2
- No. of episodes: 18 (+2 shorts specials)

Production
- Executive producer: Peter Fincham
- Producer: Victoria Pile
- Running time: Approx. 50–55 minutes, Special 90 minutes
- Production company: Talkback

Original release
- Network: Channel 4
- Release: 3 September 2004 – 4 January 2007

Related
- Campus; Piglets

Green Wing is a British sitcom set in the fictional East Hampton Hospital. It was created by the same team behind the sketch show Smack the Pony – Channel 4 commissioner Caroline Leddy and producer Victoria Pile – and stars Pippa Haywood, Mark Heap, Tamsin Greig, Stephen Mangan and Julian Rhind-Tutt. It focuses on soap opera-style twists and turns in the personal lives of the characters, portrayed in sketch-like scenes and sequences in which the film is slowed down or sped up, often emphasising the body language of the characters. The show had eight writers. Two series were made by the Talkback Thames production company for Channel 4.

The series ran between 3 September 2004 and 19 May 2006. One episode, filmed with the second series, was shown as a 90-minute-long special on 4 January 2007 in the UK, but was shown earlier in Australia and Belgium on 29 December 2006. Separate from the series, a sketch was made for Comic Relief and screened on 11 March 2005. Another was performed live at The Secret Policeman's Ball on 14 October 2006. On 29 April 2024, Green Wing returned as a six-part audio series released by Audible entitled Green Wing: Resuscitated, with a second series released on 25 June 2026.

== Synopsis ==
Green Wing's plot revolves around the lives of the staff of the East Hampton Hospital Trust, a fictional National Health Service (NHS) hospital with staff ranging from the slightly unusual to the completely surreal.

The series begins with a new arrival, surgical registrar Caroline Todd (Tamsin Greig). Caroline works alongside two other doctors: Guy Secretan (Stephen Mangan), an arrogant, half-Swiss, womanising anaesthetist, and "Mac" Macartney (Julian Rhind-Tutt), a suave, fashionable surgeon. Caroline soon develops feelings for both of them, though she is unsure as to which of the two she truly loves. Throughout the series, it becomes clear that Mac is her true love, but a range of misadventures prevent their relationship from flourishing. Other people Caroline meets include Martin Dear (Karl Theobald), a friendly house officer who is constantly failing his exams. He is unloved by his mother and is often bullied by Guy. Martin soon develops feelings for Caroline. There is also Angela Hunter (Sarah Alexander), a seemingly perfect, but irritating, senior registrar in pediatrics. Caroline dislikes Angela, but ends up taking her in as a lodger.

The main characters in Green Wing. From left to right, Alan (Heap), Joanna (Haywood), Angela (Alexander), Caroline (Greig), Martin (Theobald), Guy (Mangan), Mac (Rhind-Tutt), Sue (Gomez) and Boyce (Chris)

Caroline's main rival for Mac's affections is Sue White (Michelle Gomez), the staff liaison officer employed to listen and respond to the problems of East Hampton's staff. Sue is hostile and contemptuous towards everyone except Mac, whom she loves to the point of madness.

Alan Statham (Mark Heap) is an overbearing, stuttering and pedantic consultant radiologist. He is in a relationship with Joanna Clore (Pippa Haywood), the 48-year-old head of human resources, although she despises him. Their relationship is an open secret, with student doctor Boyce (Oliver Chris) often hinting at it when goading Alan. Joanna's staff include Kim Alabaster (Sally Bretton); Naughty Rachel (Katie Lyons); Harriet Schulenburg (Olivia Colman), an overworked mother of four trapped in an unhappy marriage; and Karen Ball (Lucinda Raikes), who is often bullied by Kim and Rachel.

The human resources characters in Green Wing. From left to right, Kim (Bretton), Rachel (Lyons), Harriet (Colman) and Karen (Raikes).

== Creation ==
=== Writers and crew ===
Green Wing was devised, created and produced by Victoria Pile. She was also the casting director, one of the writers, and part of the editing, filming and post-production teams. She described Green Wing as "a sketch-meets-comedy-drama-meets-soap", and a continuation of her previous show, Smack the Pony, where Green Wing's crew also worked. Unusually for a British sitcom, which typically has only one or two writers, the show had eight: Pile, her husband Robert Harley, Gary Howe, Stuart Kenworthy, Oriane Messina, Richard Preddy, Fay Rusling and James Henry.

Pile and her co-writers initially used battery packs to represent characters, moving them around on her desk to develop scenarios for the show. The decision to make the characters doctors came later. Pile recalls that she mentioned to Peter Fincham that a hospital setting would work well and that he subsequently reported that Channel 4 were enthusiastic about a hospital location, which settled the matter. Even later still, a plot was developed and wall charts were used to mark up story arcs.

The show was directed and edited (along with Pile) by Tristram Shapeero and Dominic Brigstocke. Sketches were sped up or slowed down to create comic effect, often using body language to create humour. Editing was also used due to the amount of corpsing that occurred during the filming of the show. Tamsin Greig was said to corpse frequently, and episodes were written to minimise the contact between the characters of Caroline Todd and Alan Statham because Tamsin Greig found it difficult not to laugh when acting alongside Mark Heap. The music, which features prominently in the show, was written by Jonathan Whitehead (under the name "Trellis") and won him an RTS Craft & Design Award.

=== Production ===
Following her success with Smack the Pony, Channel 4 gave Pile a fairly free hand with her next project. Their only requirement was that it should have enough of a narrative thread to make it more of a sitcom than a sketch show.

The show had a half-hour pilot made in 2002 that was never aired. Scenes from the pilot were used in the first episode, "Caroline's First Day", and can be spotted due to the characters' appearance, most notably Rhind-Tutt's haircut. The pilot allowed the writers to experiment, such as using different filming techniques. In the pilot, Doon Mackichan played Joanna Clore and was meant to play her in the original series, but left when she became pregnant.

Before filming, Channel 4 funded a three-month development period in which the cast rehearsed material produced by the writing team and improvised around it, with the writers incorporating material developed during the sessions into subsequent scripts.

Although each script was fully written, the actors were allowed to improvise their own jokes, frequently adding to what had already been written. Workshops were often used to allow actors to improvise their own material. One example of improvised material was Stephen Mangan's idea of Guy falling in love with Caroline. The show's crew also make appearances in the show as extras. For example, Pile's former assistant Phil Secretan (after whom Guy is named) appears at the end of a scene in the first episode. Henry appears in the background during Martin's exam in the episode, "Tests".

The filming was done at two hospitals, the Northwick Park Hospital in Middlesex and the North Hampshire Hospital in Basingstoke. This presented a problem because the show had to work around the real-life hospitals, with their actual doctors, patients and emergency situations. In one scene in the final episode in series one, Guy (Mangan) was hitting squash balls behind him, and nearly hit a patient. However, some scenes, such as those in Sue's and Alan's offices, were filmed in a studio. The pub in series two is filmed at the Foundation Beefeater in Fulwell, South West London.

Green Wing's title is said to have come from a small plastic green man with wings that was in executive producer Peter Fincham's top pocket, and fell on Pile's desk. Fincham claimed it was not his, so Pile kept it. This plastic man appears at the end of the credits on every show.

=== Unused storylines ===
Some plot lines written for Green Wing were never used. Unused storylines included Alan having an 80-year-old wife and step-grandchildren as old as him, and Guy suffering from impotence. Pile originally wanted the show to cover the entire hospital, not just doctors, but porters, car park attendants and kitchen staff. However, she decided that they had enough material with the eight main doctors and human resources workers.

Two endings were created for the special. The alternative ending is included on the DVD release of Green Wing, along with deleted scenes from the episode. The alternative ending was planned to be used if a third series was going to be commissioned, as this ending was much more ambiguous. Green Wing's cast preferred the alternative ending, but after some debate, it was not shown.

== Series summaries ==
=== Series 1 ===
The thirteen main characters appear in all nine episodes of the first series. Amongst the recurring guest characters, Lyndon, Oliver (Ken Charles), Lady Emily "Emmy" Lewis Westbrook (Daisy Haggard), Liam (Oliver Milburn), Cordelia Denby (Saskia Wickham), and Charles Robertson (Harley) all appear. However, Charles is credited as "Chief Executive" in the episode that he appears. Guest actors who appear in this series include John Oliver, Stephen Merchant, Kevin Eldon and Rosie Cavaliero. Other than Harley, other Green Wing writers make cameos. These include Fay Rusling, Gary Howe, Oriane Messina and Henry James.

No.	Title	Original release date
1	"Caroline's First Day"	3 September 2004
Caroline, having spent a bad night sleeping in her car, arrives at East Hampton Hospital for her first day of work. Guy offers her his spare room, but Caroline later discovers that Guy lied, hoping that he would sleep with her. When Caroline confronts Guy, he offers her his bedroom and sleeps on the sofa.
2	"Rumours"	10 September 2004
After spending a night at Guy's flat, Caroline attracts too much attention to herself by setting off Guy's car alarm. Guy then starts to spread rumours of a long night of passion with her. Listening in on a conversation between Boyce and Dr. Martin Dear (Karl Theobald), she discovers that Guy's middle name is "Valery" and intends to blackmail him with this information if he does not stop spreading the rumours. However, a slip-up by Guy himself about a fling with Sue White (Michelle Gomez) overshadows this, forcing Guy to stop. Also, Angela (Sarah Alexander) tells Mac that his former girlfriend is getting married.
3	"Lodgers"	17 September 2004
Caroline looks for a lodger to move in with her, but so far the only people to apply are "Loonies". When she advertises in the hospital, Boyce tells her that Angela is looking for a place to stay. Caroline, however, prefers the loonies to Angela and tries to stop her from knowing about the vacancy. Boyce tells Angela anyway and an appointment is made for her to see the house. Guy has problems when he remembers his troubled days at public school and also worries that IT manager Lyndon Jones is sniffing around "his patch" of attractive women. Alan is worried that Joanna is falling for Lyndon, so he tries to be more spontaneous. Mac learns that his former girlfriend is not only getting married, but is pregnant. Caroline reluctantly makes Angela her lodger.
4	"Joanna's Birthday"	24 September 2004
Joanna celebrates her 48th birthday. Alan gives her a present of a locket containing his sperm, but Kim (Sally Bretton) tells her it is from Lyndon. It is also Martin's mother's birthday, but she refuses to talk to him over the phone. Caroline and Angela find a database kept by Guy containing a list of all the "Hospital females" and how they rate in different sexual areas. When Caroline confronts the male staff, they blackmail her into keeping the list a secret after they claim that she made discriminatory remarks against Guy, Mac, Martin and Boyce. At the end of the episode, Martin does manage to give his birthday greetings to his mother, who turns out to be Joanna.
5	"The Housewarming Party"	1 October 2004
Caroline is worried about no-one coming to her housewarming party. Joanna has dyed her hair blonde in order to get Lyndon's attention, but Alan plans to win her back by following Boyce's advice on being mysterious. Therefore, he "kidnaps" Joanna and takes her to a secret location (a park) where they have sex. The housewarming party is a success with several people coming, such as Guy, Mac, Martin in an odd shirt, an uninvited Sue, and three of the HR admin workers, Kim, Karen (Lucinda Raikes), and Rachel (Katie Lyons). During the evening, Karen expresses her love for Martin, who is oblivious, and Caroline kisses Guy, Mac, Martin and Sue.
6	"Tests"	8 October 2004
Martin worries about failing his exams again as he prepares for more tests. Mac goes for an interview for promotion, but fails to get the job. Caroline tries to piece together what happened during the party. After having sex with Alan, Joanna is worried she might be pregnant, while Harriet thinks she might be expecting her fifth child. When they receive their pregnancy tests, Joanna and Harriet's results are mixed up, with Joanna receiving Harriet's paper saying she is pregnant and Harriet getting the all clear. But when the truth is discovered, Alan discovers he is not going to be a father, and Joanna dumps him. This leads Alan to steal a milk float in anger.
7	"Tangled Webs"	15 October 2004
Caroline decides that it is either Guy or Mac that she truly loves, but cannot decide which one. Although Guy is busy preparing for his World Guyball Championship semi-final, he and Caroline manage to get the afternoon off, much to Mac's anger. During the day out, however, Caroline makes her mind up and decides that Mac is her true love. After having been dumped by Joanna, Alan is lonely, but finds comfort in both Jesus and in the hospital chaplain, Cordelia Denby. When Martin gets his exam results, Guy lies to him about passing them, but an unexpectedly furious Mac chases him through the hospital and forces him to apologise to Martin.
8	"Slave Auction"	22 October 2004
Now knowing that she loves Mac, Caroline discovers that he already has a girlfriend: Emmy, the physiotherapist. Mac announces to her and Guy that he is moving to get a better job in Sheffield with her. Sue is horrified to learn of Caroline's love for Mac, to the extent of trying to kill her. Alan plans to raise money for charity by hosting a slave auction and puts himself up for sale when Lyndon says he will do so. Caroline also takes part, as does Guy when he learns Mac is doing so as well. Mac later gets out of the auction when he learns that Sue is going to bid for him. The night has mixed results: Martin buys Caroline for £3,000, but almost ruins their night by trying to win her affections by pretending to be a bastard. Alan is bought by Boyce for 30p and ends up sleeping in his bed. Joanna wins Lyndon, but discovers that he finds her disturbing. Sue, not being able to bid for Mac, buys Guy and makes him pretend to be Mac.
9	"Emergency"	29 October 2004
As Mac prepares to leave for Sheffield with Emmy, both Caroline and Sue try their hardest to make him stay at East Hampton. Martin, who is sick and tired of Guy bullying him, gets his own back by opening Guy's post. However, he is shocked when he discovers that the letter he opens reveals who Guy's biological parents are. Mac decides to make one last bet with Guy before he leaves: Since all of Guy's affairs have been with younger women, Mac bets Guy that he could not sleep with Joanna. Joanna herself, after being dumped by Lyndon, manages to win back the Christian Alan. Caroline, in an attempt to get Mac and Emmy to break up, accuses Emmy of being a fraud, but it turns out to be a different person with the same name. Despite this, Mac still admires Caroline's bravery. As a result, he is dumped by Emmy and embraces Caroline. Martin, after pulling Karen, tries to find Guy before he does something he will later regret. Guy is video-taping himself and Joanna having sex as evidence that he has won his bet with Mac, so Martin is too late to tell Guy that his mother is in fact Joanna. Going mad, he stabs Martin's legs with botox and steals an ambulance, taking Martin and Mac with him to Wales. Guy is in such a state that he nearly drives it off a cliff. The series ends with the three men in jeopardy, stuck in the ambulance which is teetering on the edge of the cliff.

=== Comic Relief sketch (2005) ===
Mac fends off Sue's advances by saying he will only allow her to touch his arse if she can raise £10,000 for Comic Relief. Sue asks Martin, Joanna, Guy, and Alan for the money, which she eventually manages to raise, but Mac runs off before she can get hold of him.

=== Series 2 ===
Most of the regular cast appear in all episodes. The only exception is the character of Dr. Angela Hunter (played by Sarah Alexander), who appears in the first three episodes and then leaves the hospital. Among the recurring guest characters are Dr. Holly Hawkes, Lyndon Jones (played by Paterson Joseph), Oliver (Ken Charles), The Neurosurgeon (Pip Torrens), Jake Leaf (Darren Boyd) and Charles Robertson (Harley). However, the character of Charles is credited as "CEO" in the episodes in which he appears. Guest actors who appear in this series include Nick Frost, Peter McDonald, Big Mick and Rosie Cavaliero. Apart from Harley, other Green Wing writers make cameo performances in the show, including Fay Rusling and Oriane Messina.

No.	Title	Original release date
10	"Episode 1"	31 March 2006
Mac has been in a coma for eight weeks after the accident in the ambulance. He is constantly being visited by other members of staff, amongst them Sue White. During one visit, Sue steals some of Mac's semen by masturbating him and uses it to impregnate herself. Guy has been temporarily suspended from work, but continues to irritate everyone at the hospital. Mac eventually wakes up, but is suffering from amnesia, resulting in him forgetting his relationship with Caroline. Elsewhere, Alan and Joanna's affair has hit problems after she slept with Guy, so Alan tries to trick her into opening a "present", which turns out to be a box full of flies.
11	"Episode 2"	7 April 2006
Caroline continues to cope with Mac's loss of memory. Guy returns to work, but no longer has a driving licence. Alan tries to cope without sex, while trying to pretend to Joanna that he is having sex in an attempt to make her jealous. Mac, who was planning to move to Sheffield for a better job at another hospital, discovers that Sue told the Sheffield hospital that he was dead and that his new job opportunity has gone.
12	"Episode 3"	14 April 2006
A documentary crew have come to film at East Hampton. Caroline becomes jealous when she learns that Angela is to star in the show. Sue becomes jealous of Joanna after she learns that Joanna is in charge of the programme. Angela is then offered a job working on television in Canada. Martin tells Sue that a drunken Guy gave him a videotape of Guy and Joanna having sex. Sue then steals the tape and blackmails Guy and Joanna, telling Joanna that she must put her in charge of the documentary instead. Angela visits Sue to leave the hospital for Canada but Sue orders her and Guy to break up the relationship between Caroline and Mac. However, Mac discovers what is going on and takes the tape off Sue. Everything returns to normal, except the absence of Angela who manages to get her television job.
13	"Episode 4"	21 April 2006
With Angela gone, a new paediatrics registrar is needed at the hospital. However, Caroline and Mac are shocked to discover that the new registrar is Mac's former girlfriend Holly. Mac also has problems with Alan trying to get his unused parking space for his new car. Guy is looking for new accommodation while doing his community service. Joanna becomes increasingly worried about having to wear glasses. Harriet tells Lyndon that her son Robbie has been excluded from school for a week for urinating over a statue of the Virgin Mary and that her husband Ian is thinking of leaving her. In an attempt to earn some money, Martin becomes a nude model for the hospital painting class, but regrets it when he finds out Sue is one of the students. Guy manages to become Caroline's new lodger.
14	"Episode 5"	28 April 2006
While at first it appears that Caroline and Mac's relationship is going well, Mac discovers that Holly never aborted the baby they had and that their four-year-old son, named Mackenzie, is very much alive. Alan decides to enter politics, but his campaigning fails to work. Joanna is still trying to get Lyndon to fall in love with her, but it appears that he is falling in love with Harriet. Martin meets a prostitute and inadvertently becomes her pimp, which leads Karen to dump him. After Caroline discovers that Mac's son is alive, she and Guy play poker. When Caroline loses, she is forced to kiss Guy as payment, but enjoys the experience.
15	"Episode 6"	5 May 2006
Caroline decides it is best for Mac to be with Holly and goes out on a date with the hospital complementary therapist, Jake Leaf. Guy becomes envious when he learns about the date and stabs Jake in the head with a Swiss Army Knife. Later, Caroline calls Mac's answering machine to tell him she thinks they made a mistake in ending their relationship. However Holly deletes the message. Alan is unusually happy due to getting 100% of the 7 votes cast in a radiology caption competition web site. Joanna becomes so sick of Alan being happy that she recruits her dwarf cousin to scare him, by painting him green, screaming and jumping from behind Alan's desk. However, Alan is so scared that he batters the dwarf to death with a stuffed heron. Martin finds out his real father's name is Donald Twat, but fails to meet up with him due to Joanna's meddling. Harriet decides to dump Lyndon because she feels guilty about their brief affair.
16	"Episode 7"	12 May 2006
Guy is becoming even more besotted with Caroline, even getting a tattoo of a Friesian (cow) because he thinks this is her favourite thing, having misheard her when she said 'freesia' (a flowering plant). Alan and Joanna become increasingly worried and paranoid about the murder of her cousin. Martin manages to win £10,000 on a scratch card, but only gets £3,000 after making an unwise deal with the newsagent. Sue discovers that Mackenzie is not Mac's son. This seems to leave the door open for Caroline again, who dumps Jake. However, Sue throws Caroline and Mac's relationship into chaos by telling everyone that she is pregnant with Mac's child.
17	"Episode 8"	19 May 2006
Joanna and Alan are still paranoid over the murder, but when Alan hears that the police are treating the death as suicide, they start to think they can get away with anything. However, when police arrive at the hospital, they decide to escape with Boyce's help. Martin, Guy and Mac decide to propose marriage to Caroline. She rejects Martin, says "Maybe" to Guy, and says yes to Mac before he actually asks the question, which in the end he never does. Harriet's husband, Ian, learns of her relationship with Lyndon and kicks her out of the house. Mac receives news from the neurologist that he is actually dying. Alan and Joanna escape the hospital by stealing a mobile home. However, Martin follows them and falls asleep in the back. When he wakes up, Alan is in such a state of shock that he eventually loses control of the van, and ends up teetering over the same cliff edge that Martin was on at the end of the first series. Caroline learns that someone wants to meet her at the train station. Believing that it is Mac, she arrives at the station to find Guy. He proposes again and Caroline agrees to marry him.

=== Secret Policeman's Ball sketch (2006) ===
A sketch was performed for Amnesty International's Secret Policeman's Ball, with performances from Tamsin Greig, Stephen Mangan, Julian Rhind-Tutt and Michelle Gomez. Mangan and Rhind-Tutt appeared in two sketches.

When the announcer at the ball asks if there is a doctor in the house, Mac puts his hand up, to Caroline's embarrassment. Things get more embarrassing when Guy also volunteers, and asks why Caroline is sitting next to Mac when she is Guy's fiancée. An unconscious patient lies on an operating table. Guy touches her breasts, takes pictures of her naked body under the blanket, and kisses her. Caroline alleges that the patient is transgender, which repels Guy. Sue White then appears in a tutu, claiming that the patient is stalking Mac, and repeating the assertion that the patient is transgender.

=== Special ===
The episode begins with the funeral of Angela, who departed the show during the second series, and was later killed by a moose. Mac, after a month's leave, discovers what has happened between Caroline and Guy, and although hurt, makes no attempt to interfere. Guy, on learning of Mac's terminal illness, tells Caroline to marry Mac instead of him.

Meanwhile, Alan and Joanna are still on the run, having abandoned Martin. Whilst on their journey, they accidentally kill three more people, a mechanic, a shop assistant and a policeman. Soon, they decide that, with no transport, money or employment, the only option is suicide. They are last seen, naked, walking hand-in-hand towards the sea. Meanwhile, Karen returns to work after her fall, but has changed drastically. She has become more confident and has developed better dress sense. Boyce ends up missing Alan, after finding that his replacement will not tolerate any misbehaviour. With Joanna gone, the office girls start to run riot. They form their own tribe and become hostile to anyone who enters the department.

Mac and Caroline finally marry, despite Mac's terminal illness (the exact nature of which is never disclosed, although Mac does tell Guy that its name has an "a" and an "e" in it). Sue gets over her obsession with Mac and finds love with a new man, who reciprocates her feelings. The episode concludes with Caroline being carried into the air by a mass of helium filled balloons at the wedding reception. The DVD box set extras include an alternative ending where Guy and Mac grab onto Caroline's ankles and are taken to the sky with her; this alternative ending concludes with Mac saying, "Caroline, there's something I've been meaning to tell you."

=== Green Wing: Resuscitated ===
The revival is set 12 years after the original series ended. Caroline is now a medical pioneer in the US, Guy has become a TV personality, and Mac has returned from several near-death experiences to continue working as a surgeon. Boyce has been promoted to head of radiology and Harriet is now head of human resources. Following their murder spree Joanna is now in prison, while Statham's lawyers got him a reduced sentence involving psychiatric care, and he is now working under Boyce. Sue is still working as the staff liaison officer and Martin has still not qualified as a doctor.

== Cast ==
=== Main characters ===
- Tamsin Greig – Caroline Todd
- Stephen Mangan – Guy Secretan
- Julian Rhind-Tutt – "Mac" Macartney
- Karl Theobald – Martin Dear
- Pippa Haywood – Joanna Clore
- Mark Heap – Alan Statham
- Sarah Alexander – Angela Hunter
- Sally Bretton – Kim Alabaster
- Oliver Chris – J. Boyce
- Olivia Colman – Harriet Schulenburg
- Michelle Gomez – Sue White
- Katie Lyons – Naughty Rachel
- Lucinda Raikes – Karen Ball

=== Recurring characters ===
- Darren Boyd – Jake Leaf
- Keir Charles – Oliver
- Daisy Haggard – Emmy
- Paterson Joseph – Lyndon Jones
- Sally Phillips – Holly Hawkes

== Critical reaction ==
The show received generally very positive reviews. The Evening Standard said that it was "a comedy as physically adroit as it was verbally sharp," and The Guardian said that "Channel 4's hospital sitcom is the most innovative comedy since, well, The Office." Criticisms of Green Wing include the lazzi methods of filming and the overall length of the episodes, with some critics claiming that hour-long episodes are too long. The show won the 2005 and 2006 Comedy Tumbleweed Awards for "Worst Camerawork." Similar comments were made by A. A. Gill. When the first series was broadcast, he praised the cast and characters, but commented negatively on the filming style and dramatic qualities. He also said:

it was one of the most freshly funny and crisply innovative comedies for years. The humour was all based in the character, not the situation. The story lines were negligible; there were no catch phrases; it was surreal in a way we hadn’t seen since Monty Python; and the cast were actors being funny from inside a characterisation, not stand-up comics bolting a cartoon persona onto the back of gags.

The rest of the series received some praise and, in a 2009 article, Gill–– writing about the current comedy output at the time–– said: "Show me a funny indigenous comedy series; show me one that has been made in the past five years, other than Green Wing."

The first series is the most popular amongst Green Wing fans. According to one poll conducted in 2006 (before the final special episode was broadcast), the fifth episode of the series, "Housewarming Party", was voted the best Green Wing episode of all. The second most popular was the eighth episode of series one, "Slave Auction". "Housewarming Party" was also watched at the "Wingin' It Green Wing convention", being voted the favourite episode in, "A landslide victory".

Critics considered the second series worse than series one. In particular, the first episode of the series was seen as poor. Cathy Pryor in The Independent on Sunday wrote of the episode:

Sadly, though, since I'm something of a fan, I have to report that the first episode of the second series is, disappointingly, rather flat. To be fair, there were a couple of laugh-out-loud moments—Dr Statham banging his head and falling down being one of them—but the whole didn't quite gel. Or should that be coagulate? I'll stop making bad jokes now since I'm still not as funny as anyone in the show. But I sincerely hope that the opener is a one-off and not a sign that Green Wing is going down the pan.

Gill was also highly critical of the episode in The Sunday Times:

Within two minutes, Green Wing had destroyed itself, lost its assured grip on the cliff of comedy and tumbled into the abyss of embarrassing overacting, formless gurning and pointless repetition. What had once looked Dada-ishly brilliant now looked like stoned improv from a show-off's drama school. The lack of plot and coherent narrative that previously had been a blessed freedom was revealed to be a formless free-for-all, brilliant performances as silly mannerisms. Nothing I've seen this year has disappointed me as sharply as the second series of Green Wing.

Chris Riley for the Daily Telegraph gave a more mixed review of the series, writing that it was "so far proving oddly impenetrable—particularly given how, first time around, it consistently demonstrated what a firm grasp it had on when to cut loose, and when to deliver more conventional laughs. But there's still enough delirious madness going on to ensure that diehard fans won't be giving up hope just yet."

The Observer was more positive, with Kathryn Flett voting Green Wing as one of the top ten television programmes of 2006. Broadcast voted Green Wing the joint-second best comedy series in 2006, alongside the sketch show That Mitchell and Webb Look, which also stars some Green Wing actors such as Olivia Colman (Harriet Schulenburg) and Paterson Joseph. They described the series as "fresh, subversive, and surreal." In South Africa, where Green Wing was broadcast on BBC Prime, The Sunday Times of South Africa voted the show the best DStv programme of 2007. Composer Daniel Pemberton wrote that the soundtrack to Green Wing was "one of the most innovative TV soundtracks in recent years."

Although the second series was heavily advertised, the first episode of the series was watched by 1.8 million people (8% of the audience). The first episode of the first series, "Caroline's First Day", attracted 2.2 million (11%) in comparison. The second episode attracted the same ratings as the previous episode, while the last episode was watched by 2 million viewers (11% of the audience). The second series was also nominated for two Royal Television Society awards; for "Best Production Design—Entertainment & Non Drama Productions" and "Best Tape & Film Editing—Entertainment & Situation Comedy", but failed to win.

== Media ==
=== DVDs ===
DVD Name	Release dates		Contents	Extras
DVD Name	Region 2	Region 4	Contents	Extras
Green Wing: The Complete First Series	3 April 2006	2 January 2008	All 9 episodes in a 3 disc set in a bespoke digipak with translucent slipcase	Deleted scenes, audio commentaries with cast & crew (Episodes 1, 2, 5 & 9 only), "Behind The Scenes" featurette, cast & crew biographies
Green Wing: The Complete Second Series	2 October 2006	7 January 2010	All 8 episodes in a 3 disc set in a bespoke digipak with translucent slipcase	Deleted scenes, audio commentaries with cast & crew (Episodes 4 (two versions), 6 & 8 only), "Behind The Scenes" featurette, cast & crew biographies
Green Wing: The Complete First & Second Series	2 October 2006	—	A box set containing both the series 1 and series 2 DVDs	The same as series 1 and 2
Green Wing: Special	8 January 2007	—	The full 90-minute episode	Deleted scenes, audio commentaries with cast & crew, "Behind The Scenes" featurette, alternative ending, cast & crew ciographies
Green Wing: The Definitive Edition	15 October 2007	—	All 18 episodes on 7 discs, plus a special bonus disc	Same as Series 1, 2, and special, plus phenomena documentary, music tracks, extra deleted scenes, and a 12-page booklet

=== Books ===
The first series scripts were released as Green Wing: The Complete First Series Scripts in paperback on 22 October 2006 (ISBN 1-84576-421-8) by Titan Books. The book contains bonus material made exclusively for the book and previously unseen photos.

=== Soundtrack ===
The soundtrack, entitled Green Wing: Original Television Soundtrack, was released by Silva Screen on 8 October 2007. It contains 23 tracks of the best of Jonathan Whitehead's Original Music created for the show.

== Awards and nominations ==
Green Wing won the first BAFTA Pioneer Audience Award in 2005. This is the only BAFTA award that is voted on by the general public. Pippa Haywood won the 2005 Rose d'Or for "Best Female Comedy Performance". Tamsin Greig won an award at the RTS Awards in 2005 for "Best Comedy Performance". Jonathan Whitehead won "Best Original Score" at the RTS Craft & Design Awards 2005. Greig received a BAFTA nomination for Best Comedy Performance in 2005, losing to David Walliams and Matt Lucas.

Green Wing also won a number of The Comedy.co.uk Awards, including the "Comedy of the Year" award in 2006.

== Possible spin-off ==
A third series of Green Wing was not made, due to scheduling difficulties with the cast and crew undertaking new projects, and a lack of budget at production company talkbackTHAMES. However, creator Victoria Pile mentioned in a 2007 interview in the Radio Times that she may create a spin-off, saying, "I'm hoping to do another Channel 4 comedy imminently, possibly starring some of the same cast. Hopefully, it will be some kind of spin-off from Green Wing."

In 2009, Pile and most of the writing team behind Green Wing created a sitcom pilot set at a university, entitled Campus, which featured similar concepts to Green Wing, including improvisation. The motto of the university was "with wings," a reference to the show. The pilot was broadcast as part of Channel 4's Comedy Showcase. A full series began in 2011, but was cancelled after one series.

== Impact ==
A cocktail called the Green Wing was served at the 2005 BAFTAs. It was made using vodka, cloudy apple juice, elderflower cordial, and sparkling mineral water. A Green Wing convention called "Wingin' It" was organised to raise money for Great Ormond Street Hospital, and took place on 13 January 2007 at the Brook Green Hotel, Hammersmith. There was a special appearance by Green Wing cast at the British Film Institute, on 17 January 2007; Pile, Greig, Mangan, and Rhind-Tutt appeared. Some of the other writers, as well as Theobald and Heap, were in the audience. The event was hosted by John Lloyd. Green Wing appeared in an episode of the BBC documentary series Imagine, entitled A Funny Thing Happened on the Way to the Studio. Some of the funeral scenes from the special were shown, and the presenter of the show, Alan Yentob, appeared as one of the mourners.
