= Freddie Davies =

English comedian (born 1937)

- Born: 21 July 1937 (age 88); Brixton, London, England

Freddie Davies (born 21 July 1937) is a British comedian and actor who came to public notice in 1964 through the television talent show Opportunity Knocks and has since appeared in several television series and films.

== Early life ==
Freddie Davies was born in Brixton, London in 1937, the grandson of music hall comedian Jack Herbert. At the start of the Second World War, Davies was evacuated to Seend in Wiltshire, subsequently to Torquay in Devon and then to Salford, Lancashire in 1941.

== Career ==
After finishing his national service in the Royal Army Pay Corps, Davies became a stand-up comedian. He began his career in 1958 as a Butlin's holiday camp entertainer. He started on the cabaret circuit in 1964, when he turned professional, and he appeared on many television shows in the 1960s, '70s and '80s including Opportunity Knocks, Sunday Night at the London Palladium, The Des O'Connor Show, The Tom Jones Show, The Bachelors Show and Blackpool Night Out.

His first appearance on the ITV talent show Opportunity Knocks, on 1 August 1964, brought him to public notice. The single joke he told involved an increasingly exasperated character remonstrating with a tiresome pet-shop owner with the words: "look here, Parrot-face!". Audience reaction prompted him to bill himself as "Freddie 'Parrot-face' Davies". He made further allusions to birds in jokes about budgies, and by playing a character he named Samuel Tweet. His visual identity included wearing a black Homburg hat pulled low on his head, pushing out his ears.

From 1968 to 1971, the long-running British children's comic Buster featured the comic-strip Freddie "Parrot-Face" Davies, based upon the adventures of Freddie and his "boodgies" (budgies). In 1974, he took the lead role in a BBC children's television series, The Small World of Samuel Tweet. Mr. Tweet worked in a pet shop in Chumpton Green, appearing with many animals during the series. He also appeared in a television commercial for Mars' "Trill" bird seed, with the slogan, "Trill makes budgies bounce with health".

After a spell touring the USA he returned to the UK and began a television acting career, appearing in Heartbeat, Casualty, Last of the Summer Wine, Preston Front, two series of Harbour Lights (as George Blade), Born and Bred, Sensitive Skin and My Family. He also appeared in the RSC's 2000-01 production of the musical The Secret Garden.

1997 he appeared in Hetty Wainthropp investigates “A Rose By Any Other Name” He played Sidney Sturridge.

Davies acted in films including the 1995 comedy Funny Bones and Harry Potter and the Prisoner of Azkaban in 2004.

While living in the Scottish village of Aberfeldy, Davies produced a DVD for the local Aberfeldy and District Gaelic Choir. He also ran a stage school, Stage One, whilst living near Aberfeldy but found it to be a difficult proposition financially. He now lives in North Yorkshire.

In December 2012 and January 2013, Davies appeared in the BBC Two documentary Blackpool: Big Night Out, sharing reminiscences of performing in the town. The programme included a clip of Davies' comedy routine at the ABC Theatre in Blackpool, on 31 July 1966, where he was appearing that year in a summer season.

He has performed in a one-man show entitled Funny Bones.

In 2022, Davis played the father of Eddie Marsan's John Darwin in the ITV Drama The Thief, His Wife and the Canoe.

== Personal life ==
Davies is a long-serving Freemason, and a Past Master of Chelsea Lodge No 3098, a London Masonic lodge for those associated with the entertainment industry. In 2026, he celebrated 60 years as a Freemason.

His autobiography, Funny Bones: My Life in Comedy, co-written by Anthony Teague, was published by Scratching Shed on 31 July 2014, fifty years after his appearance on Opportunity Knocks.

== Recordings ==
Davies also recorded several children's albums and stories for children. The Last of the Summer Wine actor Bill Owen wrote the lyrics to a romantic ballad called "So Lucky" which Davies recorded in 1972. It became a hit record in the Philippines and South America, going gold in Brazil.

== Discography ==
=== Singles ===
On some records he was billed as Freddy, rather than Freddie Davies.

Year	Title	Label
1966	"Santa Face is Bringing Me a Budgie" / "Give Us a Kiss For Christmas"	Parlophone
1967	"Semolina" / "Sentimental Songs"	Major Minor MM 512
1967	"Sentimental Songs" / "Cynthia Crisp"	Major Minor MM 536
1967	Meet Mr Parrot Face (EP)	Major Minor
1972	"So Lucky" / "If You Never Went Away (Take Good Care of Yourself)"	Pye
1974	"The Ballad of Samuel Tweet"	RCA Victor
1977	"The Ballad of Harry Ramsden's"	Kentone
1977	"Back Home for Christmas" / "Think of Me at Christmas"	Plum Records

=== Albums ===
Year	Title	Label
1970	Mr. Parrot Face	Chapter 1
1975	A Day in the Life of Samuel Tweet	Contour

== Filmography ==
Year	Title	Role	Notes
1995	Funny Bones	Bruno Parker	
1996	La Passione	Uncle Valentino	
2004	Harry Potter and the Prisoner of Azkaban	Old Man in Portrait	
