= Sensitive Skin (British TV series) =

British TV comedy-drama series (2005–2007)

- Series title card
- Genre: Comedy drama
- Created by: Hugo Blick
- Written by: Hugo Blick
- Directed by: Hugo Blick
- Starring: Joanna Lumley; Denis Lawson; Annabel Capper; James Lance; Nicholas Jones; Maggie Steed
- Country of origin: United Kingdom
- Original language: English
- No. of series: 2
- No. of episodes: 12

Production
- Producer: Hugo Blick
- Editor: Graham Hodson
- Running time: approx. 29 mins per episode
- Production company: Baby Cow Productions

Original release
- Network: BBC Two
- Release: 10 November 2005 – 31 July 2007

Sensitive Skin is a BBC television comedy-drama series, produced by Baby Cow Productions for BBC Two. It stars Joanna Lumley and was first broadcast in 2005, with a second series following in 2007. Series 1 and 2 have aired on CBC Country Canada, while series 1 aired in Australia on ABC TV in 2007.

== Plot summary ==
=== Series 1 ===
The first series is about an affluent couple, Al and Davina Jackson, who live in metropolitan London. Along with their friends, Al and Davina struggle with sexual temptation and professional jealousy and try to cope with their fear of the future. Al is a pundit for a broadsheet newspaper and is paid to find imperfection in everything, while Davina works in an art gallery and is paid to make life more beautiful. But being 60 isn't simple: the couple's 30-year-old son, Orlando, refuses to acknowledge adulthood, and Davina's sister, Veronica, and her husband, Roger, intimidate the Jacksons with their confident and controlled grasp of life.

=== Series 2 ===
The second series sees Davina attempt to start her life again, six months after Al's death. She embarks on a journey to rediscover personal happiness, but her efforts are hampered by the difficulties she faces in coping with grief alone. Moreover, Veronica is still blaming her for everything she can, while Roger faces trial for a financial crime he didn't commit.

== Cast ==
- Joanna Lumley as Davina Jackson
- Denis Lawson as Al Jackson, Davina's husband (series 1)
- Maggie Steed as Veronica Dorkins, Davina's sister (6 episodes)
- Nicholas Jones as Roger Dorkins, Veronica's husband (8 episodes)
- Oliver Cotton as Sam, Davina's employer and confidant (8 episodes)
- James Lance as Orlando Jackson, Davina and Al's son (7 episodes)
- Jean Marsh as Lizzie Galbraith, Davina's neighbour (4 episodes)

=== Notable guest cast ===
- Tom Allen as Raphie, Sam's son (2 episodes)
- Patrick Barlow as Ed Hubler, an old friend of Davina's (2 episodes)
- Denise Black as Mike's wife
- Deddie Davies as Deddie
- Freddie Davies as a manifestation of Davina's frustration (2 episodes)
- Simon Day as Mike, a lecherous plumber
- Frances de la Tour as Sarah Thorne, Al's ex-girlfriend
- Eileen Essell as Davina and Veronica's mother
- Anthony Head as Tom Paine, a personal shopper who seduces Davina (2 episodes)
- Maureen Lipman as Sue Shortstop, Ed's wife, a feminist activist (2 episodes)
- Toby Longworth as a guest
- Patrick Malahide as Leonard Richards
- Diana Quick as Cheryl, Orlando's girlfriend (2 episodes)
- Lucinda Raikes as Irina, a Chekhov character
- Adam Rayner as Greg, Al's piano teacher and Davina's paramour (3 episodes)
- Nigel Terry as George Fitzgerald
- David Warner as Robert "Bob" Ringwald, a journalist
- Simon Williams as Matthew Clasper
- Sophie Wu as Lucy

== Episodes ==
=== Series 1 ===
No.	Title	Original release date
1	"Episode 1"	10 November 2005
Davina's frustration with her life mounts as she handles her cynical husband, her passive-aggressive son, and her arrogant sister and brother-in-law.
2	"Episode 2"	17 November 2005
Al reconnects with an ex-girlfriend and begins trying to emulate her aggressive communication style.
3	"Episode 3"	24 November 2005
Bob Ringwald, a respected journalist, recruits Al to join him on a book awards panel, while he tries to seduce a torn Davina. Meanwhile, Al and Bob's doctor scams them both by imagining potentially dangerous ailments to keep them making appointments.
4	"Episode 4"	1 December 2005
To prove a point to Veronica and Roger, Davina hires a piano teacher, Greg, but he turns out to be more interested in pursuing her than in teaching Al.
5	"Episode 5"	8 December 2005
Davina thinks Roger is trying to seduce her, while Al hires a rehabilitated ex-convict to remodel their cloakroom.
6	"Episode 6"	15 December 2005
Davina and Al separate when she has an affair with Greg. The series ends on a cliffhanger, as Al suffers a heart attack after they reconcile.

=== Series 2 ===
No.	Title	Original release date
1	"The Wilderness"	26 June 2007
Six months after Al's death, Davina is searching unsuccessfully for a new home. A criminal case against Roger threatens Veronica's relationships with them both, and a lecherous acquaintance buys Roger's nude painting of Davina.
2	"Three Lost Loves"	3 July 2007
Davina befriends Sue Shortstop, a self-described "post-feminist" activist, who convinces Davina to begin attending her lectures.
3	"The Signals"	10 July 2007
Davina begins dating Tom Paine, a high-end personal shopper.
4	"Forever Jung"	17 July 2007
Davina is reunited with her son, Orlando, who has found Eastern religion – and a girlfriend Davina's age, who blames Davina for Orlando's problems. Davina and Sam try to figure out the psychology underlying the couple's relationship, and Sam reveals he's long had a crush on Davina.
5	"Kiss of Life"	24 July 2007
Roger's trial begins, with Veronica's ex-lover as his solicitor. Davina's cardiologist pursues her romantically.
6	"Here I Am"	31 July 2007
Davina revisits many of the characters from the series as she copes with her friend Lizzie's death by suicide. Orlando and Cheryl plan their wedding.

== Reception ==
The series garnered great critical reception, praising the performances and the melancholic style, which set it apart from the standard cringe-driven comedies that had been in wide circulation since The Office. Writing for the Sunday Times, Jasper Gerard called the series "one of the best pieces of television in years" and "one of the finest performances of Lumley’s 38-year career".

Public reception was also positive, with people appreciating the return of Joanna Lumley and warming to the sparse comedic style.

== Home media ==
In the UK, BBC DVD released series 1 on region 2 and 4 DVD on 16 July 2007, and series 2 on 12 May 2008. In the USA, both series were released together on region 1 DVD on 5 August 2008.

== Canadian adaptation ==
A Canadian adaptation, starring Kim Cattrall, Don McKellar, Elliott Gould, and Colm Feore, premiered in fall 2014 on Movie Central and The Movie Network. The 6-episode first season is written by Bob Martin and directed by Don McKellar.
