= Green Wing (soundtrack) =

Album by Jonathan Whitehead

Green Wing: Original Television Soundtrack

Television theme by Trellis
- Released: September 28, 2007
- Recorded: Imagination Studios Room A
- Genre: Soundtrack, alternative dance, house
- Length: 45:00
- Label: Silva Screen
- Producer: Trellis

Green Wing: Original Television Soundtrack is the soundtrack to the British sitcom Green Wing by Jonathan Whitehead, under the name "Trellis". The album contains 23 tracks originally recorded for the series, but no soundtracks recorded by other artists. The music originally won Whitehead an RTS Craft and Design Award for Best Original Score in 2005, and was also nominated for a BAFTA.

== Production ==
The album was produced for Silva Screen records. Most of the soundtracks are instrumental, however in the track "Fibre Troll", parts are sung by Jennifer McGregor. The sleeve notes themselves are written in a humorous style, describing the music in bizarre ways. For example, the note on "Last Week" (the theme tune to Green Wing) it reads:

This rousing Ouvertüre featured the signature sound of the famous, One Stringed Indian Instrument, the pitch of which is controlled by the skillful squeezing of its bamboo shaft. The three note ascending brass motif (taken from 'Akoustika' and electronically speeded up by one of Trellis' techie drones no doubt!) is in the form of an asymmetrical palindrome: it underscores perfectly that janiform state of looking back to the events of last week's episode, and simultaneously… breathlessly, anticipating the madcap thrills to come. Heaven!

It also includes other comments such as, "As a direct result of all the terror and bad things post 9/11 and as a mark of respect, it has been decided NOT to release this cd in Dolby 5.1 surround."

== Reception ==
Composer Daniel Pemberton wrote that the soundtrack to Green Wing was, "One of the most innovative TV soundtracks in recent years which has been Jonathan Whitehead's twisted work on this cult comedy show, which is now finally released as a really quite crazy-sounding album."

== Track listing ==
1. "Last Week" – 1:09
2. "Car Park" – 2:21
3. "Vibrobedhead" – 1:18
4. "Jolly Scarface" – 2:06
5. "Moon Away" – 2:12
6. "Acoustica" – 1:24
7. "No Tune" – 3:23
8. "Camel" – 1:12
9. "Ouch" – 1:07
10. "Sniff" – 2:26
11. "Kinslide" – 3:03
12. "Wig, A Wig" – 1:34
13. "King Jelly" – 1:32
14. "Fibre Troll" – 1:53
15. "Kingston" – 0:44
16. "Rhodespierre" – 0:57
17. "Grammercy" – 3:01
18. "Crab" – 2:25
19. "Twang (original)" – 1:14
20. "Fibreoptik" – 6:21
21. "Dark Kingston" – 0:43
22. "Nun Hope" – 2:12
23. "Logus" – 0:33
