= Lucinda Raikes =

English actress

- Born: 14 April 1971 (age 54); Cambridge, England
- Occupation: Actress
- Years active: 1994-present

Lucinda Mary J. Raikes (born 14 April 1971) is an English actress, most noted for playing Karen Ball in the sitcom Green Wing and Angela Heaney in The Thick of It and its spin off film In the Loop. She has also appeared in Sensitive Skin, Extras, Casanova and 15 Storeys High.

== Film ==
Year	Title	Role	Notes
2009	In the Loop	Reporter	
2009	Bright Star	Reynolds Sister	
2013	The Fifth Estate	Christian Assange	
2014	Maleficent	First Pixie	
2014	Crocodile	Angela	Short

== Television ==
Year	Title	Role	Notes
2014	The Crimson Field	Nurse Helen Jesmond	Episode #1.2
2013	Love Matters	George's Date	Series 1 Episode 1: "30 & Counting"
2008	Fairy Tales	Phoebe	Episode 1.2 ("Cinderella")
2001	People Like Us	Fiona	Series 2 Episode 2: "The Mother" (aired 27 May)
2001	Tales of Uplift and Moral Improvement	Mrs. Thorpe / Maid / Cookie	Series 1 Episodes 7 ("The Boy with No Patience"), 11 ("Generosity")
2001	Mr Charity	Rebecca	
2002	Ed Stone Is Dead	Coroner's Assistant	
2002	15 Storeys High	Health Visitor	Series 1 Episode 6: "Dead Swan"
2004-2006	Green Wing	Karen Ball	2 series, 18 episodes
2005	Extras	Lisa	Series 1 Episode 3: "Kate Winslet"
2005	Casanova	Marta Tosello	Episode 1
2005	Sensitive Skin	Irina	Series 1 Episode 3
2005-2007, 2009	The Thick of It	Angela Heaney	3 Series, Xmas special 2006 and Summer Special 2007
2006	Casualty	Wendy Radcliffe	Series 21 Episode 4: "Heads Together"
2007	Raging	Various characters	TV movie
2008	Messiah (Messiah V: The Rapture)	Liza, the Pathologist	Series 5 Episodes 1,2
2008	Casualty	Tammy Forrest	Series 23 Episode 15: "Doing the Right Thing"
2009	The Old Guys	Amber	Pilot
2009	Blue Murder	Alison Aspen	Series 5 Episode 2: "Inside"
2009	Freezing	Gloria	
2010	Any Human Heart	Miss Warburton, NID Secretary	Series 1 Episode 2
2012	Parade's End	Hullo Central / Evie, Sylvia's Maid	Series 1 Episodes 1,2,5
2015	Casualty	Angeline Densmore	Series 30 Episode 3: "Objectum Sexual"
2018	Sick Of It	Memorabilia Shop Assistant	Series 1 Episode 4: "Uncle Vinnie"
2022	Bridgerton	Mrs. Finch	Season 2 Episodes 1 ("Capital R Rake") and Episode 2 ("Off to the Races")

== Theatre ==
Play	Role	Director	Venue
The Hypochondriac	Angelique	Gemma Bodinetz	ETT/Liverpool Everyman
Mary Stuart	Mary Stuart	Ryan McBride	Union Theatre
The Children's Hour	Janet	Howard Davies	National Theatre
Rosencrantz and Guildenstern are Dead	Ensemble	Matthew Francis	National Theatre
Don Juan Comes From the War	Various	Fiona Laird	National Theatre
Lost in a Mirror	Aurora	Loveday Ingram	BAC
Mad for Love	Celia	John Farndon	Riverside Studios
Life Is A Dream	Estrella	Ruth Levin	Old Red Lion
Cloud Nine	Maud/Victoria	Patrick Lydon	Latchmere Theatre
Not Loving Susan	Susan	Lucy Bradley	King's Head Theatre
