= A Virtuous Business =

2024 South Korean television series

- Promotional poster
- Hangul: 정숙한 세일즈
- Hanja: 貞淑한 세일즈
- Lit.: Virtuous Sales
- RR: Jeongsukhan seiljeu
- MR: Chŏngsukhan seiljŭ
- Genre: Comedy drama
- Based on: Brief Encounters by: Oriane Messina; Fay Rusling
- Written by: Choi Bo-rim
- Directed by: Jo Woong
- Starring: Kim So-yeon; Yeon Woo-jin; Kim Sung-ryung; Kim Sun-young; Lee Se-hee
- Music by: Park Se-joon
- Country of origin: South Korea
- Original language: Korean
- No. of episodes: 12

Production
- Running time: 70 minutes
- Production companies: SLL; HighZium Studio; 221b

Original release
- Network: JTBC
- Release: October 12 – November 17, 2024

Related
- Brief Encounters (2016)

A Virtuous Business (Korean: 정숙한 세일즈) is a 2024 South Korean comedy drama television series written by Choi Bo-rim, directed by Jo Woong, and starring Kim So-yeon, Yeon Woo-jin, Kim Sung-ryung, Kim Sun-young, and Lee Se-hee. The series is a remake of the 2016 British television series Brief Encounters by Oriane Messina and Fay Rusling. Set in the 1990s, it tells the story of four women in a rural area who do door-to-door sales of adult products. It aired in 2024 on JTBC from October 12 to November 17 every Saturday and Sunday at 22:30 (KST). It is also available for streaming on Netflix in select regions.

== Synopsis ==
The plot follows the independence, growth and friendship of the four Bangpan Sisters, who jump into door-to-door sales of adult products in a rural village in 1992, when sex was still a taboo topic.

== Cast and characters ==
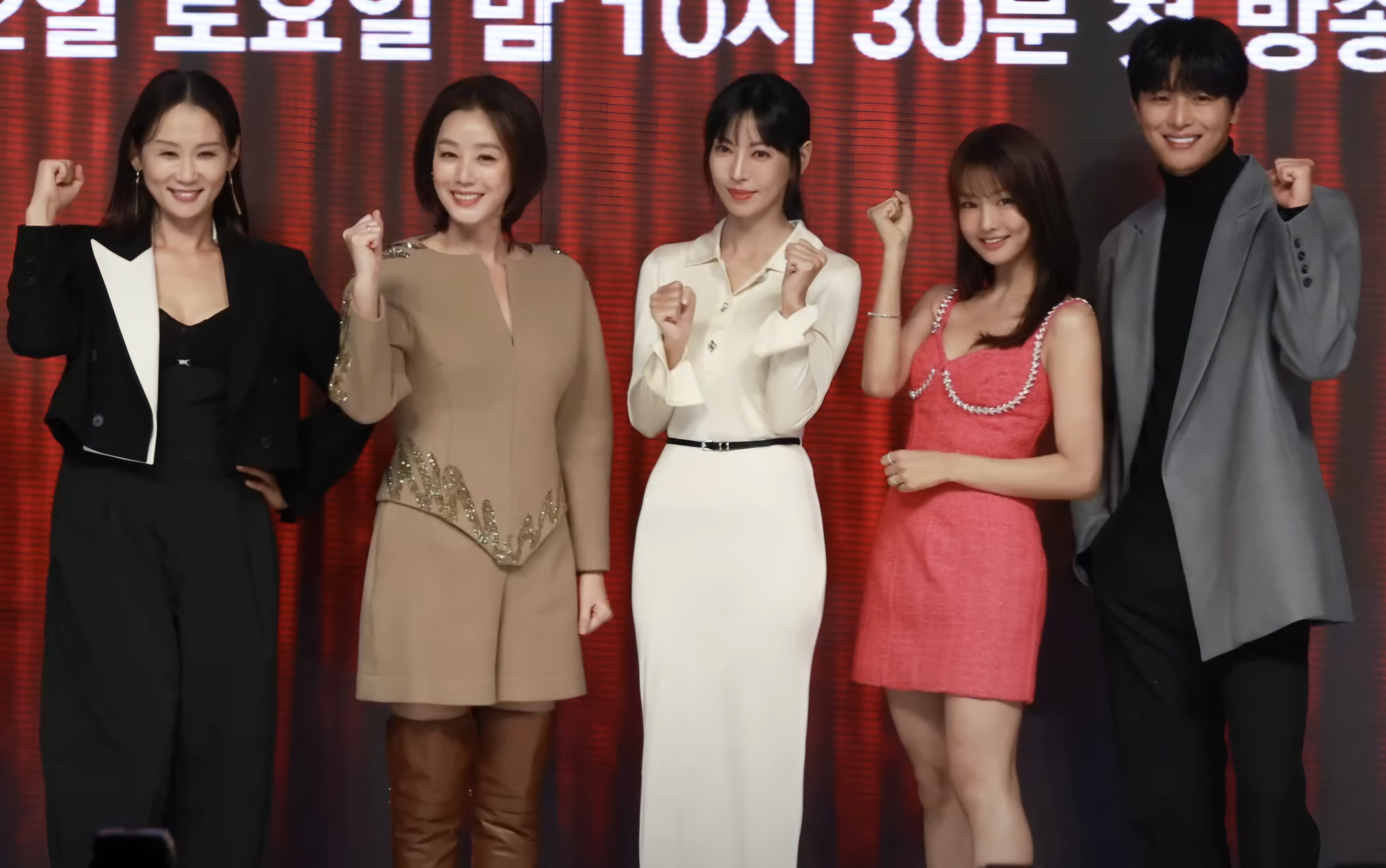
A Virtuous Business main cast at the press conference on October 11, 2024

=== Main ===
- Kim So-yeon as Han Jeong-suk

A housewife who lives a virtuous life. She elected as the Geumje Chili Lady "Jin" with her bright beauty, married her husband, her first date, and led a modest and passive life. However, she is unable to buy her only son a new bag and worries about monthly rent arouses her. When she jumps into door-to-door sales of foreign adult products to make money on her own, she discovers the natural talent of a marketer she did not know she had.

- Yeon Woo-jin as Kim Do-hyun

An American-style detective who lived in the United States. He grew up in a wealthy family and graduated from a prestigious Ivy League school, returns to Korea and is promoted quickly through special promotions at Gangnam Police Station but for some reason, he is transferred to Geumje Police Station.

- Kim Sung-ryung as Oh Geum-hee

The elegant brain of the Bangpan Sisters. She graduated from Ewha Womans University who grew up well-mannered and called a lady back then. However, she is currently spending her free days in Geumje, the hometown of her husband whom she married through her family's arrangement.

- Kim Sun-young as Seo Young-bok

A mother of four children who has a wonderful relationship with her husband. She jumps into door-to-door sales to somehow provide separate rooms for her children. She also plays the role of licorice that makes the Bangpan Sisters laugh by turning even extreme situations into humor.

- Lee Se-hee as Lee Joo-ri

A single mother raising her son alone and Geum-je's "it girl". She runs a beauty salon and wins the hearts of men who send her sly glances for enjoying unconventional clothes with her smiling face and cute speech. At first, she enters door-to-door sales thinking that it is an interesting event in her boring daily life, but she grows up to become the brash youngest who wakes up her sisters with a lively fact bomber who is not frustrated under any circumstances.

=== Supporting ===
- Kim Won-hae as Choi Won-bong

Geum-hee's blunt kkondae husband, owner of the town pharmacy.

- Choi Jae-rim as Kwon Seong-soo

Jeong-suk's unfaithful fighter husband.

- Im Chul-soo as Park Jong-sun

Young-bok's loving but incompetent husband

- Kang Ae-shim as Lee Bok-soon

Jeong-suk's mother

- Seo Hyun-chul as Do-hyun's colleague

- Jeong Soon-won as Do-hyun's colleague

- Kim Jung-jin as Eom Dae-geun

Son of a wealthy real estate agent who the townspeople can't stand, he has low self-esteem, works part-time at the town pharmacy and is very geeky, highly enthusiastic about the things he likes, and secretly a great photographer.

- Park Ok-chul as a local supermarket owner

- Park Ji-ah as a butcher shop owner

- Kim Sun-mi as a rice shop owner

- Joo In-young as Cheol-mul

A hardware store owner who is one of the Anti Sisters fighting against Bangpan Sisters.

- Hong Ji-hee

- Shim Wan-joon as Park In-tae

- Jeon Su-ji as Um Seo-yeon

- Woo Hyun-joo as Jo Soon-ae

- Jung Young-joo as Heo Young-ja

Owns a real estate agency, overbearing mother of Eom Dae-geun, who doesn't respect her son and thinks he's a failure. The one who led the Anti Sisters who is called Madam Bokdeokpang.

=== Special appearance ===
- Ra Mi-ran as Kim Mi-ran

CEO of Fantasy Lingerie, a company that sells adult products door-to-door by Bangpan Sisters.

== Production ==
In March 2024, Kim So-yeon, Lee Se-hee, Kim Sung-ryung, and Kim Sun-young were reportedly cast as the four female leads of the series.

In May 2024, Yeon Woo-jin was reportedly cast as the male lead of the series.

In July 2024, the five actors were officially confirmed to lead the series. Directed by Jo Woong, written by Choi Bo-rim, provided by SLL, and co-produced by HighZium Studio and 221b.

== Release ==
JTBC announced that A Virtuous Business was scheduled to air in the second half of 2024. The series was confirmed to be broadcast on October 12, 2024, every Saturday and Sunday. It is also available to stream on Netflix in select regions.

== Viewership ==
A Virtuous Business : South Korea viewers per episode (millions)

Season	Episode number												Average
Season	1	2	3	4	5	6	7	8	9	10	11	12	Average
1	0.833	1.016	1.014	1.289	1.124	1.302	1.126	1.302	0.995	1.355	1.271	1.898	1.210

Source: Audience measurement performed nationwide by Nielsen Korea.

Average TV viewership ratings
Ep.	Original broadcast date	Average audience share (Nielsen Korea)	
Ep.	Original broadcast date	Nationwide	Seoul
1	October 12, 2024	3.862% (1st)	3.996% (1st)
2	October 13, 2024	4.544% (1st)	4.676% (1st)
3	October 19, 2024	4.632% (1st)	5.101% (1st)
4	October 20, 2024	5.924% (1st)	6.495% (1st)
5	October 26, 2024	5.070% (1st)	5.559% (1st)
6	October 27, 2024	6.035% (1st)	6.188% (1st)
7	November 2, 2024	4.834% (1st)	5.091% (1st)
8	November 3, 2024	5.576% (1st)	5.664% (1st)
9	November 9, 2024	4.393% (1st)	5.027% (1st)
10	November 10, 2024	5.950% (1st)	6.015% (1st)
11	November 16, 2024	5.725% (1st)	5.846% (1st)
12	November 17, 2024	8.580% (1st)	9.077% (1st)
Average		5.377%	5.391%
In the table above, the blue numbers represent the lowest ratings and the red numbers represent the highest ratings.; This drama aired on a cable channel/pay TV which normally has a relatively smaller audience compared to free-to-air TV/public broadcasters (KBS, SBS, MBC, and EBS).

== Accolades ==
Award ceremony	Year	Category	Nominee	Result	Ref.
Bechdel Day	2025	Bechdel Choice 10	A Virtuous Business	Placed	

=== Listicles ===
Name of publisher, year listed, name of listicle, and placement
Publisher	Year	Listicle	Placement	Ref.
NME	2024	The 10 best Korean dramas of 2024	9th place	
