= The Pinky and Perky Show =

Television series

- Genre: Comedy; Children's; Animated
- Created by: Jan Dalibor (original characters); Vlasta Dalibor (original characters)
- Written by: Alan Gilbey; Mark Daydy; Ian Carney; Andrew Clifford; Lee Pressman; Simon Jowett; Joel Jessup; Darren Jones; Sally Marchant; Oriane Messina; Fay Rusling; Deborah Scott-Lovric
- Directed by: Cyril Adam
- Voices of: David Holt; Duncan Wisbey; Teresa Gallagher; Jimmy Hibbert; Ella Kenion; Steve Brody; Kevin Bishop; Mike Hayley; Renton Skinner; Niky Wardley; Mark Perry; Jessica Robinson; Lizzie Roper
- Theme music composer: Glenn Gregory; Keith Lowndes
- Opening theme: "It's the Pinky and Perky Show"
- Ending theme: "It's the Pinky and Perky Show" (Reprise)
- Composer: Ben Lee-Delisle
- Countries of origin: United Kingdom; France
- No. of seasons: 1
- No. of episodes: 52

Production
- Executive producers: Jess Cleverly; Aton Soumache; Alexis Vonarb; Tapaas Chakravarti; Camilia Deakin; Steve O'Pray; David Willing
- Producer: Ruth Fielding
- Editor: Laurent Blot
- Running time: 13 minutes
- Production companies: Method Films; Lupus Films & Picture Production Company (Note: Through their joint venture Pinky & Perky Enterprises); DQ Entertainment

Original release
- Network: CBBC; France 3
- Release: 3 November 2008

The Pinky and Perky Show is a 2008 revival of Pinky and Perky. It stars the two anthropomorphic pigs. It is in full CGI and produced by Method Films and Picture Production Company, and in association with Pinky and Perky Enterprises. 52 episodes were produced.

== Plot ==
The show stars the Pigs named Pinky and Perky, together they run their children's show called The Pinky and Perky Show. Together they handle different situations whether being bringing a band back together, trying to get the most stickers and even finding lost treasure. Pinky is the kind hearted pig and animator of the cartoon "The Adventures of Power Pig and Porker" while his other brother Perky is spoilt and takes things for granted.

== Setting ==
Unlike the original puppet series, the show is set in a world of anthropomorphic animals, such as K.T., a cat who serves as the show organizer; Wilberforce, a turtle who works as the security guard; Vera, a fox who hosts a morning show; and Eric, a dog who serves as Vera's co-host. Each episode takes place in the PPCTV Studio.

== Cast ==
- David Holt as Pinky
- Duncan Wisbey as Perky
- Teresa Gallagher as KT
- Jimmy Hibbert as Wilberforce
- Ella Kenion as Tara & Vera
- Steve Brody as Eric
- Kevin Bishop as Powerpig & Porker and various comedy cameos
- Mike Hayley as Sir Percival
- Renton Skinner as Morton Frog

=== Minor ===
- Niky Wardley as Tamara
- Mark Perry as Simon Cow
- Jessica Robinson as various comedy cameos
- Lizzie Roper as various comedy cameos

== Production ==
The show is produced by DQ Entertainment, Method Animation and Picture Production Company and in association with Pinky and Perky Enterprises. It is distributed worldwide by Granada International. One series has been produced so far with 52 episodes.

In 2005 after when London-based animation studio Lupus Films announced an CGI reboot of the live-action series Pinky & Perky, Lupus Films teamed up with creative production agency Picture Production Company to form a joint venture unit Pinky & Perky Enterprises that would serve as a production company for the upcoming reboot with Celador International was set to distribute the series

In August 2006, Lupus Films partnered with French animation studio Method Films and Indian animation production company DQ Entertainment to co-produce its CGI animated reboot of the live-action series Pinky & Perky with the latter company handling animation services for the upcoming series.

On 11 November 2007, Lupus Films announced that BBC (who formerly produced the original series) and French broadcasting network France 3 had commissioned the studio's CGI reboot of the live-action series called The Pinky and Perky Show as ITV's worldwide distribution unit Granada International acquired worldwide rights to the CGI reboot featuring the piglet duo excluding UK and France.

In September 2008, ITV Global Entertainment sold international broadcasting pre-sales to the upcoming CGI animated reboot The Pinky & Perky Show to YLE in Finland, TVP in Poland and SVT in Sweden.

== Episodes ==
No.	Title	Original release date
1	"Pup Idol"	3 November 2008
2	"The Menacing Phantom"	4 November 2008
3	"Keep Fit"	5 November 2008
Sir Percival hires `Sporticle' (a parody of LazyTown's Sportacus), a keep fit guru, to get his staff into shape. Sporticle confiscates all sugary food and imposes a strict exercise regime. Unimpressed, Pinky and Perky smell a rat when he tries to sell his own `healthy' snacks instead, and uncover the truth about him on their live show.
4	"The Baloonatic"	6 November 2008
5	"License to Swill"	TBA
6	"Axe Factor"	TBA
Simon Cow plans to make receptionists Tara and Tamara the next big singing superstars with their video hit 'Stinky and Turkey no!', however, when Perky finds out they will be performing on their show, he tries to stop them.
7	"Cartoon Mash-up"	TBA
After a rejection for a new cartoon to replace Power 'Pig and Porker', the brothers enemy uses a device to make their cartoon say mean things about people, including Sir. Percival causing him to cancel the cartoon.
8	"What's Up Documentary"	TBA
9	"Pretty in Pork"	TBA
10	"You'll Believe a Pig Can Fly"	TBA
11	"Punk Rocker Pig"	TBA
An anger-management prone punk rocker who is to appear on Pinky and Perky's show singing his number one hit 'No, No, No' has decided to turn away from punk music and enter the opera world, causing the boys to find a replacement.
12	"It's Christmas"	TBA
13	"Harry Trotter"	TBA
Famous teen actor of the popular 'Harry Trotter' films arrives at the studio to perform on the Pinky and Perky show, though, tired of being known as his on-screen counterpart, he plans to announce his departure from the franchise, which could cause the brothers show to be blamed for destroying 'Harry Trotter'.
14	"The Day of the Living Gunge"	TBA
15	"Prod It Like Peckham"	TBA
Football superstar David Peckham guest stars on the show, however with all of the attention on him, Perky becomes jealous and pretends to be a major sports star of a made up sport, he then seeks Pinky's help to create the sport in time for the show.
16	"Lights, Camera, Auction"	TBA
17	"Quiz Me!"	TBA
18	"Wrestlemaniac"	TBA
19	"Porchetta"	TBA
Perky tries to keep his lie of having a girlfriend named Porchetta going, however struggles when Sir. Percival orders a special love-themed episode of the show, with Perky and Porchetta to have a date on live television.
20	"Some Like It Not"	TBA
21	"The Incredible Sulk"	TBA
22	"Red Snout Day"	TBA
23	"Dr. Roo"	TBA
After a rehearsal for a 'Dr. Roo' segment on the Pinky and Perky show goes wrong, major fan, Pinky believes that Dr. Roo is real and he must protect him from the evil cyborgs, who are really just actors.
24	"Most Definitely"	TBA
25	"Pink'd"	TBA
26	"The Apprenticeship"	TBA
27	"Virtual Insanity"	TBA
28	"Card Times"	TBA
29	"The Pig and the Porker"	TBA
30	"Don't Try This at Home"	TBA
31	"The Alfie and Artie Show"	TBA
32	"The Pig Chill"	TBA
33	"Shiny"	TBA
34	"This Episode Has a Title but It's a Secret"	TBA
35	"The Pinky and Eric Show"	TBA
36	"What a Pal"	TBA
37	"Robin Hood and His Merry Pigs"	TBA
Famous actor, known for his work on Robin Hood and His Merry Pigs visits the studio for a sketch scene, however when told to do his own stunts, he tries to leave.
38	"By Royal Aporkment"	TBA
39	"NannyGoat Gruff"	TBA
A special guest on Morning, Morning, Morning, NannyGoat Gruff helps Pinky and Perky learn to behave, which pits the brothers against each other all to receive a sticker.
40	"Pig Issues"	TBA
41	"Pinky Goes Green"	TBA
42	"The Pig Sleep"	TBA
Playing video games all night, Pinky must let Perky look awake in order to keep the show running, however it becomes difficult after Eric finds out Perky is sleep deprived.
43	"KT-Rella"	TBA
44	"You Must Be Joking"	TBA
45	"This Little Piggy"	TBA
46	"No Strings Attached"	TBA
47	"The T&T Factor"	TBA
48	"Piglets of the Caribbean"	TBA
49	"Where Is Everybody"	TBA
50	"Most Definitely Haunted"	TBA
51	"Meet the Beakles"	TBA
52	"Pret The Porker"	TBA

== Home media ==
A DVD has been released by the Australian Broadcasting Company and the British Broadcasting Corporation called Licence to Swill and contains 8 episodes from the series. Another DVD was released in September 2, 2010 entitled Cartoon Mashup.

Title	Region 4 release date	Region 2 release date	Episodes
Pinky And Perky - License To Swill	1 April 2010	20 April 2009	8 Episodes
Pinky And Perky - Cartoon Mashup	2 September 2010	2010	8 Episodes
