= Back (TV series) =

British sitcom

- Genre: Sitcom
- Created by: Simon Blackwell
- Written by: Simon Blackwell; John Finnemore; Oriane Messina; Fay Rusling; Will Smith
- Directed by: George Kane; Ben Palmer
- Starring: David Mitchell; Robert Webb
- Country of origin: United Kingdom
- Original language: English
- No. of series: 2
- No. of episodes: 12

Production
- Executive producers: Kenton Allen; David Mitchell; Robert Webb; Simon Blackwell; Victoria Grew; Matthew Justice
- Producers: Kate Daughton; Lyndsay Robinson
- Camera setup: Single-camera
- Running time: 25 minutes
- Production companies: Big Talk Productions; That Mitchell & Webb Company

Original release
- Network: Channel 4
- Release: 6 September 2017 – 25 February 2021

Back is a British sitcom created by Simon Blackwell and starring David Mitchell and Robert Webb. It was broadcast on Channel 4 and ran for two series from 6 September 2017 to 25 February 2021. The programme was filmed and is set in and around Stroud, Gloucestershire.

A second series of six episodes was announced in November 2017; filming was scheduled to begin in October 2019. On 19 September 2020, Webb announced that filming of the second series was complete. The first episode was broadcast on 21 January 2021 on Channel 4.

The first series premiered on Sundance Now in December 2017 before premiering on Sundance TV in the US in September 2018. The second series premiered on 31 March 2021 on sister network IFC in the US a week later after it premiered in full on Sundance Now on March 24.

== Plot ==
After the death of his father, Laurie, 42-year-old Stephen Nichols is poised to take over the family business, the John Barleycorn pub, in Stroud, Gloucestershire. His plans are interrupted when Andrew, a former foster child who had spent several months with Stephen's parents during Stephen's youth, unexpectedly arrives to renew his relationship with the family. Andrew, a globe-trotting overachiever of questionable character, charms Stephen's family, who embrace him as a rightful heir. Stephen, a failed lawyer, resents Andrew, and views him as "a glib, dangerous sociopath who's about to steal his family, his business and his life". Andrew fondly recalls the brief time he spent living with the family as the happiest days of his life, whereas Stephen remembers them as miserable and punitive.

== Cast ==
- David Mitchell as Stephen Richard Nichols
  - Sebastian Patterson as Young Stephen
- Robert Webb as Andrew Thomas Donnelly
  - Caius Luckyn-Malone as Young Andrew
- Penny Downie as Ellen May Nichols, mother of Stephen and Cass
- Louise Brealey as Cassandra Leslie "Cass" Nichols, Stephen's sister
- Geoffrey McGivern as Geoff, Stephen’s uncle and Laurie's brother
- Matthew Holness as Laurie, Stephen's deceased father, who appears in flashbacks
- Olivia Poulet as Alison, Stephen's ex-wife
- Oliver Maltman as Mike, barman
- Jessica Gunning as Jan, barmaid
- Michael Wildman as Tom, Alison's partner
- John Macmillan as Julian, clergyman
- Julie Dray as Juliet, the French chef
- Anna Leong Brophy as Bryony
- Emily Lloyd-Saini as the vet
- Penny Ryder as Wendy
- Clive Francis as Phil
- Julian Kostov as Luca
- Alice Lowe as Joanna
- Shelley Conn as Annie

== Episodes ==
| Series | Episodes | Originally released | |
| Series | Episodes | First released | Last released |
|---|---|---|---|
| 1 | 6 | 6 September 2017 | 11 October 2017 |
| 2 | 6 | 21 January 2021 | 25 February 2021 |

=== Series 1 (2017) ===
| No. overall | No. in series | Title | Directed by | Written by | Original release date | U.K viewers (millions) |
|---|---|---|---|---|---|---|
| 1 | 1 | "Episode 1" | Ben Palmer | Simon Blackwell | 6 September 2017 | 1.75m |
Failed lawyer Stephen's father Laurie has recently died, and he makes plans to take over the family's pub, the John Barleycorn. On the day of the funeral there is an unexpected mourner at the graveside: Andrew, who was supposedly Stephen's foster brother from March to August 1987. Stephen is suspicious of Andrew, a compulsive braggart whose intentions are suspect and whose worldly achievements are questionable. Andrew recalls a playful bond with Stephen and Laurie, but Stephen has little recollection of their childhood time together. A female stranger in a café asks Stephen to briefly mind her dog. However, she disappears and Stephen is forced to take the dog home with him.
| 2 | 2 | "Episode 2" | Ben Palmer | Simon Blackwell | 13 September 2017 | 1.08m |
Stephen learns that Laurie left five percent of his pub business to Andrew. Stephen buys five static caravans to attract tourists to the vacant property around the pub. Stephen tries to demonstrate to his family the appeal of the cramped caravans by living in one himself. Andrew decides to stage a trendy outdoor food festival on the property, including rented amusement park rides and local artisans. In the midst of the festival, Stephen returns to his caravan and discovers that patrons are using it as a public toilet. Meanwhile, his ex-wife Alison and her partner Tom are trying to conceive a baby and ask to use Stephen's caravan to have sex. Tom insists that Stephen guard the door to prevent people from entering. The festival incurs a financial loss, but Andrew considers it a public relations success. Stephen's mother Ellen grows close with a young vicar named Julian, who converts her to Christianity. Ellen unsuccessfully tries to encourage Stephen to convert.
| 3 | 3 | "Episode 3" | Ben Palmer | Simon Blackwell | 20 September 2017 | 1.04m |
Andrew suggests many improvements to the pub, including attractive bar staff. Stephen disagrees with the changes, but they go ahead and garner an increased number of customers and many excellent TripAdvisor reviews. Stephen accuses Andrew of creating reviews under fake identities. Stephen makes bad reviews pretending to be customers; Andrew discovers they are inauthentic but after a tense moment of implying he knows Stephen is to blame, claims they were likely done by the new staff, so Andrew brings back the old staff. Alison tells Stephen that she has put her house up for sale, and that she intends to move to a large city. Cass tells Stephen that she is considering having sex with Andrew.
| 4 | 4 | "Episode 4" | Ben Palmer | Simon Blackwell | 27 September 2017 | N/A |
Cass prepares to travel the world at Andrew's encouragement. Stephen and Andrew visit the pub's suppliers, continuing Laurie's annual tradition of doing so, but find almost none of the suppliers know of Laurie. At the last supplier, who confesses to being Laurie's lover, they discover that Laurie and Ellen enjoyed an open marriage. They remember a friend who suddenly disappeared in 1987, and wonder if they killed him. After Stephen and Andrew return home, Cass tells Andrew that she is not going to travel because she is in love with him. He persuades her to still travel, now for five or six months, and she considers selling her pub shares to fund the trip. The pub catches fire, caused by cigarettes that Geoff allowed the customers to smoke.
| 5 | 5 | "Episode 5" | Ben Palmer | Simon Blackwell | 4 October 2017 | N/A |
The family repair the pub after the fire. Cass sells her share of the pub to Andrew, and goes travelling. Geoff intends to sell his farm to developers who want to build a housing estate there. Stephen finds a corpse hanging from a tree whilst looking for his dog. With no signal on his mobile phone, Stephen looks for help and finds Andrew is jogging through the forest, and tells him about the situation. Andrew phones the police and gives a television interview, claiming that he found the body and is the pub's landlord, frustrating Stephen. Cass returns after four days with a new boyfriend, having travelled no further than Lille, where she met him. A man falsely claims that he has Stephen's lost dog, and tries to extort money from Stephen by threatening to kill it. Stephen and Andrew meet the extortionist in a car park. Geoff, who knows that the dog has come home, turns up and beats the extortionist with a baseball bat. Alison tells Stephen that the pub will be offered 40% above market value to sell their land for an access road to the new estate.
| 6 | 6 | "Episode 6" | Ben Palmer | Simon Blackwell | 11 October 2017 | 1.02 |
Andrew has made the pub successful with its new French chef, Juliet. Cass splits up with her boyfriend. Geoff and Cass test negative for bowel cancer, which Laurie and his father died of. When Stephen considers doing the same, Ellen confesses that he is likely the biological son of one of her flings, rather than Laurie. A gathering is held in the pub for Laurie's would-be 69th birthday, to which Ellen invites her former foster children. One of them, Chris, says that he once shared the same accommodation as Andrew and is unsure that he is the real Andrew. Stephen researches Andrew's history and discovers that Andrew served a prison sentence in France for maiming a child whilst drink driving. Stephen blackmails Andrew; Andrew agrees to leave and sell his pub shares to Stephen in exchange for his crime remaining secret. Juliet reveals that it was actually her mother drink-driving – and Andrew took the blame, serving the prison time. The truth known, Andrew returns. Stephen grows suspicious of Juliet's retelling of the drink-driving "truth" before she returns to France.

=== Series 2 (2021) ===
| No. overall | No. in series | Title | Directed by | Written by | Original release date | U.K viewers (millions) |
|---|---|---|---|---|---|---|
| 7 | 1 | "Episode 1" | George Kane | Simon Blackwell | 21 January 2021 | N/A |
Stephen returns from a wellness centre for alcohol rehab and moves back in the family house, only to discover that Ellen and Julian have become a couple. After learning that his stay in rehab was funded by Andrew, Stephen suspects Andrew's motives and swears revenge with the help of Alison. A trendy new pub named P:ub opens as a competitor to the Barleycorn. The new pub offers Stephen a management position, but he rejects the offer after Andrew and Alison warn him the pub is owned by scammers looking for an incompetent manager to scapegoat.
| 8 | 2 | "Episode 2" | George Kane | Will Smith | 28 January 2021 | N/A |
Charismatic Mike shows up in the Barleycorn and Ellen reveals that he is one of three men who are potentially Stephen's father. Stephen struggles with his feelings about his biological father, and suspects this emotional turmoil is Andrew's latest scheme. Alison arranges a paternity test to settle the matter, but upon receiving the results Stephen sets the document on fire without reading it. Alison confirms via the email copy that Stephen is Laurie's son. Andrew overhears that Alison's parents are increasingly dependent on her support and decides to help and advise the elderly couple without informing Alison.
| 9 | 3 | "Episode 3" | George Kane | Simon Blackwell | 4 February 2021 | N/A |
Geoff enters a sham marriage with his employee Luca to get him a visa in the aftermath of Brexit, but Andrew suspects Luca is plotting a scam and hires Alison to investigate. Cass moves out while she studies part time A-level, but finds her "student accommodation" is filled with dysfunctional non-student tenants. Julian and Ellen plan to move to a new parish in Tring. Stephen takes up cycling to focus on his health, but it is a ruse to disguise his drinking habit, as he hides vodka in hedges along his bike route. When he suspects someone else has found and is drinking his "hedge vodka," he sets a trap by filling the bottle with Rinse Aid. A jogger drinks the tainted vodka, and calls the police accusing Stephen of attempted poisoning. Andrew starts spending time with Alison's mum while she is busy investigating Geoff's estate.
| 10 | 4 | "Episode 4" | George Kane | John Finnemore | 11 February 2021 | N/A |
Alison convinces the jogger who Stephen tricked into drinking Rinse Aid to not take the matter to court. Andrew continues to spend time with Alison's parents, helping with jobs that Alison intended to do. P:ub has to close for asbestos remediation, so they ask the John Barleycorn to host their pub quiz. Stephen is tormented by the memory of Laurie's last pub quiz, in which their team was beaten by the Brights team when Stephen got the jackpot question wrong. Since the topic was law, which Laurie paid for Stephen to study, Laurie was angry. The Barleycorn assemble a team, as do Cass and her housemates. The Brights are easily ahead in the first round. Andrew manipulates Stephen into reporting the Brights for entering the quiz with a minor on the grounds that it is a form of gambling, and their two main members are disqualified. A guilty-feeling Andrew then defects to the Brights. In the tiebreaker between the Brights and the Barleycorn team, Stephen is against Andrew. Andrew lets Stephen win by purposely giving the wrong answer.
| 11 | 5 | "Episode 5" | George Kane | Fay Rusling, Oriane Messina and Simon Blackwell | 18 February 2021 | N/A |
Andrew spends more time with Alison's parents, who prefer him to Stephen. Under Andrew's influence, they plan to sell the house and get divorced. Luca has run away after stealing Geoff's savings and auctioning the farm equipment, and later fraudulently makes charges to Stephen's bank. Cass confesses that she was having an "affair" with Luca, and suspects pregnancy. Ellen announces that she is engaged to Julian, and chooses Andrew to walk her down the aisle. Maurine is euthanized at the veterinary; small traces of rat poison are found in her post-mortem, and Alison and Stephen suspect Andrew poisoned her. They start scheming about murdering Andrew, which brings them to an emotional peak and they have sex. The next morning Alison reveals she has tracked down Andrew's biological mother and plans to use this information to exact revenge.
| 12 | 6 | "Episode 6" | George Kane | Simon Blackwell | 25 February 2021 | N/A |
Stephen and Alison have restarted their romantic relationship, and arrange for Andrew to meet his biological mother. Though Andrew knows Stephen facilitated the meeting with a bribe, he is thankful. Meanwhile, Alison's parents reunite as her mother is inept as bar staff and her father gets bored of travelling. Cass tests negative for pregnancy. Alison adopts a retired service dog which is skilled at detecting cancer, which concerns the group when it moves towards Ellen. She is later confirmed to have cancer and starts chemotherapy. Due to the diagnosis, Ellen and Julian move their marriage forward, which causes concern in Stephen as he suspects Julian may be attempting to inherit the pub and house. Later, Stephen and Andrew are mourning at Ellen's burial. In a final scene reminiscent of Andrew's introduction in the first episode, they are joined by an unknown mourner.

== Reception ==
Back received critical acclaim. On Rotten Tomatoes, the first series has a score of 100% rating based on 20 reviews, with an average rating of 7.6/10. The site's critical consensus reads: "Intriguing, intelligent, and dripping with searing social satire, Back proves a welcome return for collaborators David Mitchell and Robert Webb."

The second series received a score of 95% on Rotten Tomatoes, based on 19 reviews, with an average rating of 7.7/10. The site's critical consensus reads: "After a long hiatus, Back returns as sharp and irreverent as ever."

The review aggregator website Metacritic reported a combined score for both series of 85 out of 100, based on reviews from 12 critics.
