= Bearded Ladies (radio show) =

British radio programme, 2003-2007

- Genre: Comedy radio
- Running time: 30 minutes
- Country of origin: United Kingdom
- Language: English
- Home station: BBC Radio 4
- Starring: Oriane Messina; Fay Rusling; Charlotte MacDougall; Susie Donkin
- Original release: 2003 – 2007
- No. of episodes: 22
- Website: Official website

Bearded Ladies is a radio programme that was originally aired on BBC Radio 4 between 2003 and 2007. There are currently 22 half-hour episodes; although the last 6, aired in 2007, do have a loose narrative structure holding the individual sketches together, it is essentially a sketch-driven comedy programme. It stars Oriane Messina, Fay Rusling, Charlotte MacDougall, and Susie Donkin.

"This sub-Smack the Pony all-female comedy troupe set back feminism some 30 years...The Bearded Ladies couldn't raise a laugh with a syringe full of adrenaline and those defibrillator things they use in ER. Have Radio 4 comedy commissioner Caroline Raphael's ears fallen off?" - Gareth McLean, The Guardian
