= The Old Guys =

- The Old Guys title card for series 1.
- Genre: Sitcom
- Created by: Jesse Armstrong; Sam Bain
- Written by: Jesse Armstrong; Sam Bain; Simon Blackwell
- Directed by: Dewi Humphreys
- Starring: Roger Lloyd-Pack; Clive Swift; Jane Asher; Katherine Parkinson; Justin Edwards
- Theme music composer: Ivor Cutler (Series 1); Clive Swift; Roger Lloyd-Pack
- Opening theme: "I'm Happy"
- Ending theme: "Barabadabada"
- Country of origin: United Kingdom
- Original language: English
- No. of series: 2
- No. of episodes: 12

Production
- Executive producers: Alan Tyler; Cheryl Taylor
- Production locations: BBC Pacific Quay, Glasgow
- Production company: BBC Scotland

Original release
- Network: BBC One; BBC One HD (series 2)
- Release: 31 January 2009 – 13 August 2010

The Old Guys is a British sitcom that revolves around two ageing housemates: Tom Finnan (Roger Lloyd-Pack) and Roy Bowden (Clive Swift). The pair live across the street from Sally (Jane Asher), whom they both find attractive. Tom moved in with Roy after Roy's wife Penny deserted him. Baby boomer Tom has little in life but his daughter Amber (Katherine Parkinson), who is dating Sally's son Steve (Justin Edwards). Roy is a suburban pensioner who believes that he is one of the country's leading intellectuals.

It premiered on 31 January 2009 on BBC One, and aired on Saturday evenings. The show concluded its second series on 13 August 2010. The series has been repeated on Gold.

== Production ==
The sitcom is produced by BBC Scotland, and is written by Jesse Armstrong, Simon Blackwell and Sam Bain. The show was commissioned by Lucy Lumsden, BBC Controller of Comedy Commissioning in 2008. It is recorded at BBC Pacific Quay in Glasgow.

In 2005, while in the early stages of development, a script for The Old Guys was used for a BBC Three competition, The Last Laugh, aimed at encouraging young writers. Along with seven other scripts for potential sitcoms, the first 13 scenes were published, and entrants invited to write the remainder.

== Characters ==
- Roger Lloyd-Pack as Tom
- Clive Swift as Roy
- Jane Asher as Sally
- Katherine Parkinson as Amber
- Vincent Ebrahim as Rajan
- Justin Edwards as Steve

== Title music ==
For its theme tune the series has used Ivor Cutler's distinctive song "I'm Happy", which can be found on his 1967 Ludo album. The theme song heard during the end credits is "Barabadabada" from his 1976 Jammy Smears album. Series 1 used the original recording of "I'm Happy", whilst Series 2 used a version performed by Lloyd-Pack and Swift.

== Episodes ==
=== Series overview ===
Series	Episodes	Originally released	
Series	Episodes	First released	Last released
1	6	31 January 2009	7 March 2009
2	6	9 July 2010	13 August 2010

=== Series 1 (2009) ===
No.	Title	Directed by	Written by	Original release date
1	"Sally's Party"	Dewi Humphreys	Simon Blackwell	31 January 2009
Tom and Roy offer to help Sally with the preparations for her party in the hope that they will be invited to it. Sally is hoping that Tom's daughter will show an interest in her son. Then Tom injures himself and Roy is left trying to help both Sally and Tom.
2	"The Therapist"	Dewi Humphreys	Sam Bain & Jesse Armstrong	7 February 2009
Roy goes to see therapist Ned at Amber's suggestion where he tells Ned all his secret dreams and fantasies about Sally. He is horrified when Sally meets Ned and there is a mutual attraction. In the meantime, Sally is standing in the local council election to try to save the Post Office. Roy becomes her campaign manager, so he can spend more time with her.
3	"Marriage"	Dewi Humphreys	Simon Blackwell	14 February 2009
Tom finds out that he would get money from his pension providing he was married so Tom asks Sally to marry him. Amber is eager to make an impression on her new manager, Marianne who is an enthusiastic cyclist but sadly Tom never taught her when she was a child. Roy decides to teach Amber to cycle and this annoys Tom.
4	"The Old Flame"	Dewi Humphreys	Simon Blackwell	21 February 2009
Sally falls in love with Mark who is an old flame from a long time ago. This distresses Tom and Roy. Roy makes friends with Mark and it seems that Tom might never get together with Sally and may lose his greatest friend. Meanwhile, Amber insists on finding out why her father has never said that he loves her.
5	"The Croft"	Dewi Humphreys	Sam Bain & Jesse Armstrong	28 February 2009
Roy and Tom take up Sally's suggestion of a week in a croft in Scotland where she was going to stay with her boyfriend. Tom is soon bored, so he invites Amber over. Roy takes the chance to ask Sally if she would move to the country with him on a permanent basis. Note: This episode is unusual for the fact that it is set in Scotland. In fact, the entire series was filmed in Scotland, despite being set in England.
6	"The Courtesan"	Dewi Humphreys	Sam Bain, Jesse Armstrong & John Finnemore	7 March 2009
Roy and Tom are visiting London and meet Katia, a Belorussian prostitute in Soho. Both men find out that the other has been visiting Katia. Amber goes to a church group as she fancies the local vicar.

=== Series 2 (2010) ===
No. overall	No. in series	Title	Directed by	Written by	Original release date
7	1	"Quiz"	Dewi Humphreys	Simon Blackwell	9 July 2010
Tom and Roy, anxious about getting old, become determined to win the pub quiz to prove that their minds are still agile. This episode was watched by 3.3 million viewers.
8	2	"Triple Date"	Dewi Humphreys	Sam Bain & Jesse Armstrong	16 July 2010
Just as Tom is getting ready for his date Joanna, an emergency call from Amber takes Tom away and he begs Roy to go in his place, explain the situation to Joanna and get the conversation going until he can get there. By the time Tom finally arrives Roy and Joanna are well acquainted and much to Tom's annoyance end up on a triple date.
9	3	"Tom Moves Out"	Dewi Humphreys	Sam Bain & Jesse Armstrong	23 July 2010
Tom finally gets a flat of his own and moves out of Roy's house. But can the pair live without each other?
10	4	"Builders"	Dewi Humphreys	Simon Blackwell	30 July 2010
When Sally has builders at her house, she temporarily moves in with Tom and Roy. But will living with Sally be the dream the guys imagined?
11	5	"Hospital"	Dewi Humphreys	Simon Blackwell	6 August 2010
A nervous Sally goes into Hospital for a knee operation. This in turn leads to Tom and Roy competing to be the best visitor.
12	6	"Engagement"	Dewi Humphreys	Sam Bain & Jesse Armstrong	13 August 2010
Tom's daughter Amber is proposed to by her boyfriend Steve. Sally helps Tom to plan the big day, while Roy is left being the "agony aunt" to Steve and his concerns about the wedding day. Amber's full name is revealed to be `Amber Margaret Catherine Moon Unit Finnan´ during the wedding vows.

== Ratings ==
The Old Guys ran for twelve episodes over two series. All episodes are thirty minutes. The first series aired at around 9:30 pm every Saturday. The first episode gained 4.95 million viewers, an audience share of 22.5%. The second episode slumped slightly with 3.75 million (17.2%) viewers. The second series began on 9 July 2010 and ended on 13 August 2010. Both series of the show are occasionally repeated on Gold as part of their late-night broadcasting schedules.

== Reception ==
The Old Guys received mixed reviews. David Chater in The Times stated, "There is nothing wrong with the comic performances, but such an unashamedly old-fashioned format is strangely at odds with its subject matter. Peep Show this isn't." The Daily Mirror commented, "Moved to a new home on Friday nights, where it's much-needed, the second series of The Old Guys feels as comfortable as a pair of slippers."

== International distribution ==
In Australia the show originally aired on ABC1. In the US the first series is currently available on some PBS stations.

== Home media ==
The first series of The Old Guys was released on Region 2 DVD on 28 June 2010. Both series are also available to buy on iTunes, despite the second one not being released on DVD.
