= Breeders (TV series) =

Comedy television series

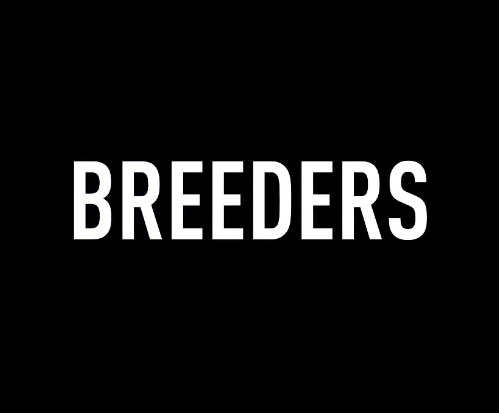
- Genre: Dark comedy
- Created by: Martin Freeman; Chris Addison; Simon Blackwell
- Showrunner: Simon Blackwell
- Starring: Martin Freeman; Daisy Haggard
- Theme music composer: Moses Concas
- Opening theme: "I Feel the Street - Live"
- Countries of origin: United Kingdom; United States
- Original language: English
- No. of seasons: 4
- No. of episodes: 40

Production
- Executive producers: Martin Freeman; Chris Addison; Simon Blackwell; Richard Allen-Turner; Rob Aslett; David Martin; Jon Thoday; Michael Wiggs; Toby Welch
- Producers: Toby Welch; Dan Kay; Jim Poyser; Kenny Tanner
- Running time: 22–33 minutes
- Production companies: Avalon Television; FXP

Original release
- Network: FX (United States); Sky One (United Kingdom; seasons 1–2); Sky Comedy (United Kingdom; seasons 3–4)
- Release: March 2, 2020 – September 25, 2023

Breeders is a British dark comedy television series created by Martin Freeman, Chris Addison and Simon Blackwell. The series follows two parents who struggle with parenthood and is partially based on Freeman's own experiences. Freeman plays one of the two leads in the series, along with Daisy Haggard, and is also an executive producer on the show along with Addison and Blackwell.

The series premiered on March 2, 2020, on the American cable network FX, and on the British network Sky One on March 12, 2020. The second series premiered in March 2021, and the third series in May 2022. The fourth and final series, premiered in July 2023.

== Cast and characters ==
=== Main ===
- Martin Freeman as Paul Worsley, a father of two and Ally's partner. He has worked in an office job at a charity for around twenty years, making him its longest-serving employee. Despite his caring and protective nature, he also has anger management issues relating to his two children, which sees him smoking cigarettes and lashing out at his family. His rage later becomes so bad he is forced to temporarily leave his home after his teenage son, Luke, begins to develop anxiety over Paul's temper.
- Daisy Haggard as Ally Grant, a mother of two and Paul's partner. She worked for, and later became partner at a sound studio firm.

=== Supporting ===
- George Wakeman (series 1; guest series 2–3), Alex Eastwood (series 2–3) and Oscar Kennedy (series 4) as Luke, Paul and Ally's son
- Jayda Eyles (series 1; guest series 2–3), Eve Prenelle (series 2–3) and Zoë Athena (series 4) as Ava, Paul and Ally's daughter
- Joanna Bacon as Jackie Worsley, Paul's mother
- Alun Armstrong as Jim Worsley, Paul's father
- Stella Gonet as Leah Grant, Ally's mother
- Patrick Baladi as Darren, Paul and Ally's friend and Ally's boss, then business partner
- Michael McKean as Michael Grant (series 1), Ally's estranged father

=== Recurring ===
- Tim Steed as Carl, Paul and Ally's next-door neighbour
- Hugh Quarshie as Alex (series 2–3), Leah's new husband
- Jordan A. Nash as Jacob (series 2–3), Luke's friend
- Aliyah Sesay (series 2–3) and Ruby Fubara (series 4) as Grace, Ava's friend
- Sally Phillips as Gabby (series 3), Leah's neighbour
- Andi Osho as Susie (series 3–4)
- Deepica Stephen as Maya (series 4), Luke's girlfriend
- Jessie Williams as Holly (series 4)

== Episodes ==
Season	Episodes	Originally released	
Season	Episodes	First released	Last released
1	10	March 2, 2020	April 27, 2020
2	10	March 22, 2021	May 17, 2021
3	10	May 9, 2022	July 11, 2022
4	10	July 31, 2023	September 25, 2023

=== Series 1 (2020) ===
No. overall	No. in season	Title	Directed by	Written by	Original release date	U.S. viewers (millions)
1	1	"No Sleep"	Ben Palmer	Simon Blackwell	March 2, 2020	0.328
Paul Worsley and Ally Grant are the parents of two children, Luke and Ava. In an attempt to get the two to sleep, Paul and Ally take turns looking after the children with flashbacks showing the early stages of Paul and Ally's relationship as well as the early days of looking after their newborn son, Luke.
2	2	"No Places"	Ben Palmer	Simon Blackwell	March 2, 2020	0.212
Paul and Ally attend parents's evening to see how Luke and Ava are progressing in school.
3	3	"No Accident"	Ben Palmer	Simon Blackwell	March 9, 2020	0.179
As Ally tries to adjust to the reappearance of her father, Michael, Paul begins questioning himself in the light of recent events.
4	4	"No Lies"	Ben Palmer	Barunka O'Shaughnessy	March 16, 2020	0.243
Paul and Ally struggle to adjust with Michael being around while Luke tests Paul's patience when he tries to prove a school friend of his is right about Santa not existing.
5	5	"No Dad"	Ben Palmer	Oriane Messina & Fay Rusling	March 23, 2020	0.188
When the pet gerbil Sprout dies, Paul and Ally are thrilled but when Ally's father, Michael dies in an accident, the two not only struggle to deal with the loss but to also explain the very concept of death to Luke and Ava.
6	6	"No Talking"	Chris Addison	Jamie Brittain	March 30, 2020	0.298
As Paul, Ally, Luke and Ava head to Darren's country house, Ally struggles with her feelings over her father's death.
7	7	"No Exit"	Chris Addison	Jamie Brittain	April 6, 2020	0.249
A day out ends unexpectedly when the class bear, Lenny who Luke is looking after goes missing and complicating matters is the fact that it's started to rain while Paul struggles to hide a secret from Ally, one that could change their relationship.
8	8	"No Honeymoon"	Chris Addison	Oriane Messina & Fay Rusling	April 13, 2020	0.144
Paul struggles to focus on his upcoming marriage to Ally but Ally's work and Luke's bad behavior threaten to jeopardise things.
9	9	"No Cure Part 1"	Chris Addison	Simon Blackwell	April 20, 2020	0.278
With Ally in Berlin, Paul struggles to deal with her absence while looking after both Luke and Ava.
10	10	"No Cure Part 2"	Chris Addison	Simon Blackwell	April 27, 2020	0.252
When Luke is rushed to hospital, Paul and the family rally together, waiting for news, only to discover the marriage isn't as perfect as they thought it was as stress and fear over Luke possibly dying reveals cracks in the family.

=== Series 2 (2021) ===
No. overall	No. in season	Title	Directed by	Written by	Original release date	U.S. viewers (millions)
11	1	"No Surrender"	Ben Palmer	Simon Blackwell	March 22, 2021	0.364
With Luke having successfully recovered and on the verge of turning thirteen and Ava now ten years old, Paul and Ally continue to struggle with raising their two children.
12	2	"No Fear"	Ben Palmer	Oriane Messina & Fay Rusling	March 22, 2021	0.256
Luke's anxiety worsens, becoming a problem for both his school and home life, resulting in Paul and Ally making the difficult decision to get a medical diagnosis in hopes of an answer while Ally faces tension when her mother, Leah is robbed.
13	3	"No Connection"	Ben Palmer	Jamie Brittain	March 29, 2021	0.195
Paul begins to fear that his culturally-fragmented family are no longer interested in watching Dancing with the Stars, a hobby they did in the past, forcing him to take measures to do so while his parents, Jim and Jackie struggle with the changes unfolding in their neighbourhood.
14	4	"No Faith"	Ben Palmer	Rebecca Callard	April 5, 2021	0.206
As Jim and Jackie try to come to terms with a sudden death, Ava's fighting to keep a secret from her father, Paul while Ally finds it becoming increasingly difficult to keep her true feelings about Luke hidden.
15	5	"No Baby"	Ben Palmer	Jamie Brittain & Barunka O'Shaughnessy	April 12, 2021	0.160
As Ally struggles to deal with the fact she's pregnant again, new information from a Doctor changes things as Ava who's worried tries to help her mother and Luke is beginning to regret lying about his anxiety.
16	6	"No Choice"	Ollie Parsons	Fay Rusling	April 19, 2021	0.156
As Ally struggles with being under huge pressure, Jim and Jackie, Paul's parents are excited about moving to the coast.
17	7	"No Excuses"	Ollie Parsons	Rebecca Callard	April 26, 2021	0.226
Paul and Ally's marriage is in crisis with Paul being obsessed over what happened yet refusing to discuss it while Luke who's becoming increasingly trouble refuses to go to school despite Paul insisting otherwise and Leah and her boyfriend, Alex make an announcement that surprises everyone.
18	8	"No Friends"	Ollie Parsons	Simon Blackwell	May 3, 2021	0.247
Still feeling distant from Ally, Paul rekindles an old friendship but at a cost while Luke surprises everyone by getting a best friend as Jim and Jackie move.
19	9	"No Power Part I"	Ollie Parsons	Simon Blackwell	May 10, 2021	0.181
The family celebrates Jim and Jackie's golden wedding anniversary but the party ends due to a power outage while the growing tensions between Paul and Luke seemingly reach the point of no return.
20	10	"No Power Part II"	Ollie Parsons	Simon Blackwell	May 17, 2021	0.139
As Leah and Alex get married, Paul and Luke confront each other over Paul's temper, resulting in Paul making a decision that could change everything forever.

=== Series 3 (2022) ===
No. overall	No. in season	Title	Directed by	Written by	Original release date	U.S. viewers (millions)
21	1	"No Direction Home"	Chris Addison	Simon Blackwell	May 9, 2022	0.120
With Paul having moved out after realising that his anger management issues were causing Luke anxiety, he, Ally, Luke and Ava all struggle to adjust to what's happened as flashbacks show the good and bad times the family went through.
22	2	"No Worries"	Chris Addison	Simon Blackwell	May 9, 2022	0.070
As the family adjust to their separation routines, life couldn't be more different for Paul and Ally, Paul getting comfortable with his new calm and serene location while Ally struggles with the lifestyle of raising two children as a single parent and a crisis at her job.
23	3	"No Comfort"	Chris Addison	Rose Heiney	May 16, 2022	0.155
As Leah and Alex return from their honeymoon, Paul is sidelined by a back injury and begins getting high on Leah's supply of painkillers, even spending more time with Luke while Ally and Ava's relationship continues to go further downhill with Ally also looking for someone to blame for the whole mess.
24	4	"No Body"	Chris Addison	Rebecca Callard	May 23, 2022	0.168
Paul and Ally struggle with the process of aging, resulting in tempers being reignited.
25	5	"No Can Do"	Chris Addison	Simon Blackwell	May 30, 2022	0.189
As the family prepare to celebrate Ava's birthday, Ally prepares to save the company and hopefully her career while Paul rediscovers the ambition for his job.
26	6	"No Show"	Ollie Parsons	Oriane Messina & Fay Rusling	June 6, 2022	0.189
As Paul struggles to make funding cuts at work, Ally attempts to impress Ava, only for the effort to fail, leading Ally to confront Paul and deliver some harsh home truths.
27	7	"No Pressure"	Ollie Parsons	Taylor Glenn	June 11, 2022	0.107
As Luke and Jacob reunite, rekindling their friendship, Paul and Ally also reconcile. However, Paul's rage returns with a vengeance and this time his target is Ava.
28	8	"No Way Back"	Ollie Parsons	Simon Blackwell	June 18, 2022	0.158
Paul brings his parents out for the day, but an unexpected revelation from his mother has everyone struggling to come to terms and threatens Jim and Jackie's marriage.
29	9	"No More Part One"	Ollie Parsons	Simon Blackwell	June 27, 2022	0.172
Paul and Ally struggle to deal with Jackie who's moved in after separating from Jim while Luke has to make a choice and Ally meets someone new.
30	10	"No More Part Two"	Ollie Parsons	Simon Blackwell	July 11, 2022	0.087
An argument between Paul and Ally is interrupted when Paul's father, Jim is hospitalised with Ava secretly informing a Doctor of her worries that her grandfather is suicidal while Paul and Ally have to decide once and for all - will they continue to live together or is this the end of their marriage?

=== Series 4 (2023) ===
No. overall	No. in season	Title	Directed by	Written by	Original release date	U.S. viewers (millions)
31	1	"Noël"	Chris Addison	Simon Blackwell	July 31, 2023	0.174
Five years later, Paul and Ally are on the verge of splitting; Jim and Jackie are in turmoil; Luke and his girlfriend, Maya, drop a bombshell at Christmas dinner that will change everyone's lives forever.
32	2	"No Alternative"	Chris Addison	Simon Blackwell	July 31, 2023	0.071
The reality of Luke's announcement hits; Paul and Ally worry about the decision he and Maya made and whether they should support them; as a new year starts, the Worsley family gather together with Maya's family, united in their love and worry.
33	3	"No Age"	Chris Addison	Gabby Best & Rose Heiney	August 7, 2023	0.138
34	4	"No Dinner"	Chris Addison	Daniel Cullen	August 14, 2023	0.099
35	5	"No Regrets"	Chris Addison	Simon Blackwell	August 21, 2023	0.105
36	6	"No Arseholes"	Ollie Parsons	Rebecca Callard	August 28, 2023	0.122
37	7	"No Kids"	Ollie Parsons	Taylor Glenn	September 4, 2023	0.151
38	8	"No Control"	Ollie Parsons	Sonya Kelly	September 11, 2023	0.104
39	9	"No Matter What: Part One"	Ollie Parsons	Simon Blackwell	September 18, 2023	0.105
40	10	"No Matter What: Part Two"	Ollie Parsons	Simon Blackwell	September 25, 2023	0.087

== Production ==
=== Development ===
On March 7, 2018, it was announced that Avalon Television was developing a comedy series created by Martin Freeman. The series was originally a co-production between the BBC and FX, similar to the drama series Taboo. A pilot was already filmed at the time of the announcement. On October 14, 2018, it was announced that FX and Sky (the latter replacing the BBC) had commissioned the series with ten half-hour episodes, with a series debut in 2020. On January 20, 2020, FX announced that the series would premiere on March 2, 2020.

On May 18, 2020, the series was renewed for a second series which premiered on March 22, 2021. On May 27, 2021, the series was renewed for a third series. On July 19, 2022, the series was renewed for a fourth series. On June 28, 2023, it was announced that the fourth series would be the final series and premiere on July 31, 2023.

=== Casting ===
Alongside the series announcement, it was announced that Freeman would star in the series. Furthermore, Daisy Haggard and Michael Gambon were also cast in the series. However, on April 21, 2019, it was reported that Gambon left the series as he was having trouble memorising his lines due to memory loss issues.

=== Filming ===
Filming for the second series had been delayed by sixteen weeks due to the COVID-19 pandemic. Following the delay, filming for the second series began on September 1, 2020, in London, and concluded production on December 18, 2020. series 3 began filming in November 2021 and concluded filming in March 2022.

== Release ==
The series premiered on March 2, 2020, on FX in the United States and Canada. The series premiere coincided with the launch of FX on Hulu and therefore the series became the first FX series with episodes available on Hulu by the next day. In Bulgaria and Poland, the series airs on HBO Europe. The series was formerly broadcast in Australia on Foxtel, via its broadcast network FOX One and on demand services until May 2022. It comes as Disney is looking forward to reclaiming its FX and 20th Television titles in order to stream them exclusively on the company's service: Disney+. Breeders moved to Disney+ on June 1, 2022. Soon after Breeders Departed Foxtel and its Service, the third series moved to streaming on June 15, 2022, exclusively on Disney+ as a Star Original with new episodes airing on a weekly basis.

== Reception ==
=== Critical response ===
On the review aggregation website Rotten Tomatoes, the first series has a score of 83% with an average score of 6.8/10, based on 35 reviews. The website's critics consensus reads, "A provocative addition to the growing slate of shows about parents behaving badly, Breeders' take on the realities of child-rearing are as hilarious as they are cringe-inducing." Metacritic, which uses a weighted average, has assigned the first series a score of 65 out of 100 based on 13 critics, indicating "generally favorable reviews".

Rotten Tomatoes gave the second series a score of 100% with an average score of 8/10, based on 7 reviews. The third series has a score of 100% with an average score of 8/10, based on 5 reviews.

=== Accolades ===
Year	Award	Category	Nominee(s)	Result	Ref.
2020	Venice TV Awards	Best Comedy	Rob Aslett, Richard Allen-Turner, Simon Blackwell, David Martin, Jon Thoday, Martin Freeman, Chris Addison, Michael Wiggs, Toby Welch, Sophie MacClancy, Ben Palmer, Avalon Television	Won	
2021	BAFTA Awards	British Academy Television Award for Best Female Comedy Performance	Daisy Haggard	Nominated	
2021	Hollywood Critics Association TV Awards	Best Cable Series, Comedy	Breeders	Nominated	
2021	Hollywood Critics Association TV Awards	Best Actor in a Broadcast Network or Cable Series, Comedy	Martin Freeman	Nominated	
2021	Hollywood Critics Association TV Awards	Best Actress in a Broadcast Network or Cable Series, Comedy	Daisy Haggard	Nominated	
2022	Young Artist Awards	Best Performance in a TV Series: Guest Starring Teen Artist	Jordan A. Nash	Won	

== See also ==
British sitcom
