= The Foxbusters =

British animated television series

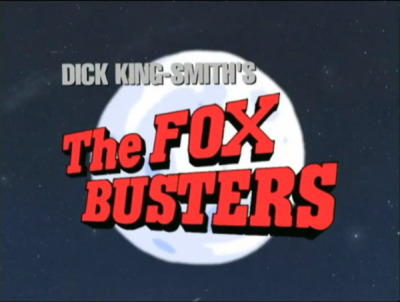
- Title screen
- Genre: Animation; Comedy
- Created by: Dick King-Smith
- Developed by: David Max Freedman; Alan Gilbey
- Written by: David Max Freedman; Alan Gilbey; Joel Jessup
- Directed by: Jon Doyle
- Voices of: Whoopi Goldberg; Joanna Lumley; Jane Horrocks; Jimmy Hibbert; Rob Rackstraw
- Composers: Keith Hopwood; Phil Bush
- Country of origin: United Kingdom
- Original language: English
- No. of series: 2
- No. of episodes: 26

Production
- Executive producer: Brian Cosgrove
- Producer: Jon Doyle
- Running time: 11 minutes
- Production companies: Cosgrove Hall Films; Anglia Television; United Productions

Original release
- Network: ITV (CITV)
- Release: 9 September 1999 – 24 November 2000

The Foxbusters is a British animated TV series that is loosely based on the 1978 Dick King-Smith book The Fox Busters. It was made by Cosgrove Hall, and consists of two series of thirteen 11-minute episodes each, made between 1999 and 2000. The show was co-written by the animation partnership of David Max Freedman and Alan Gilbey, and occasionally with Joel Jessup as a third writer. It was directed by Jon Doyle.

Which led to its receiving two major awards in 2000, The show won two major awards in 2000: a BAFTA for 'Best Animated Series' and the other was from the British Animation Awards for 'Best Children's Series'. and the British Animation Awards for "Best Children's Series".

Despite being a critical success, the show did not enjoy the same level of commercial success as some of its competitors and the show ended in 2000 after just two series. While not seeing much commercial success upon release, In spite of this and in more recent years the show and the series has been remembered by fans and picked up a cult following, particularly in furry fandom.

While the show was broadcast in Europe Africa, Australia, and Asia, the show had been picked up for consideration for US buyers and broadcasters but they were put off by the certain voice over comments on the barnyard action and never aired in the United States.

== Plot ==
The show is primarily set on Foxearth Farm, a fictional farm based in the English countryside in the West Midlands, which is dominated by a variety of animals, such as horses, cows, donkeys, cats, dogs, ducks, and particularly the chickens. The Foxbusters are three chickens, Ransome, Sims, and Jeffries (named after the British agricultural machinery maker of the same name), who have the unlikely ability to fly. Each has a different personality; Ransome is the best flyer, Sims is the smartest and Jeffries is the comic relief. The Foxbusters also have the ability to fly chase the foxes and spit grit like machine guns, and drop hard-boiled eggs like they were bombs - and these are used to effect among the other methods to keep the hungry pack of foxes in Foxearth Forest at bay.

The arguments and conversations between the chickens make an effective comedy. The foxes have the attempts to get better of the chickens but are usually unsuccessful, but they add a lot of humor to the show, as much as the chickens do, and nonetheless incredibly creative. The show itself is laden with gags and action, and is of quality.

== Characters ==
=== The Foxbusters ===
- Ransome - The best flyer of the Foxbusters, Ransome is cocky and arrogant; she has the biggest fanbase on the farmyard and is often looking for new ways to impress the other farm animals. She is often seen arguing with her sister Sims and has a big ego. Unlike her British-accented sisters, she speaks in an African-American accent, due to her voice actress' unique accent. She is voiced by Whoopi Goldberg.
- Sims - The oldest, thinnest, and smartest of the three sisters, Sims organizes the ways the Foxbusters co-ordinate their defenses on the farmyard against the foxes and is often conniving new and inventive ways of deferring the foxes from the farm. She is the most serious of the sisters. She is voiced by Joanna Lumley.
- Jeffries - Jeffries, being the largest and least capable flyer, makes her mark as the comedian of the trio. She is typically on the outside and doesn't want to seriously harm the foxes, but still defends the farm with the same vigor as her sisters when required. She is even friendly with Todd, one of the foxes (who is also ironically on the outside) as shown in Winging It. She is voiced by Jane Horrocks.

=== The Foxes ===
- King Voracious - The leader of the foxes and main antagonist of the series, Voracious is a large, handsome, and charismatic red fox who is a somewhat unstable and sadistic character. He sometimes appears to lose authority in the pack of foxes, but at the same time still leads them into constantly (and unsuccessfully) trying to get the better of the chickens. Despite being a fox, his appearance and model is more similar to that of a wolf. He is voiced by Rob Rackstraw.
- Attila - A young and ragged fox who notably only has one eye (how he lost his other eye is never explained), Attila is devious and cunning, but is also rather volatile, especially whenever his plans go wrong (as they often do). He is often depicted as Voracious' second-in-command. He has occasionally shown a more lighthearted and more playful side. He is usually scheming with his sister, Evita. He is voiced by Rob Rackstraw.
- Evita -A young vixen who is Attila's sister and as such, they are often seen working together. Like Attila, she is cunning and mean spirited, but is also incredibly resourceful. She is typically humourless and practical like Attila, but has too the occasional scenes of comic relief. She is sometimes depicted to be in a relationship with another fox called Vlad. She is voiced by Joanna Lumley.
- Todd - Often working together with Attila and Evita, Todd is nothing like most of the other foxes. He is not very smart and is often accident-prone. He also does not seem to understand why the other foxes are trying to capture the chickens and thus acts neutrally, but often is seen helping out in the foxes' plans, and the undoing of them. He is voiced by Jimmy Hibbert.
- Queen Voracity - Voracious' mate. She is pompous, arrogant and she does not get on with Voracious very well (although the feeling is mutual). She is voiced by Joanna Lumley.
- Ghengis - A fox cub who is Voracious' and Voracity's son. He rarely speaks, and instead appears to be more interested in biting any living thing that comes near him. Thus the other foxes are very reluctant to babysit him, as he is also hard to entertain. He is voiced by Jimmy Hibbert.
- Volpone - One of the oldest foxes in the forest and Voracious' father. Once the leader of the foxes before being succeeded by his son, he is now occasionally left with the unpopular task of babysitting his grandson Ghengis. Like Voracious, he looks different from the other foxes. Though unlike him, his appearance is of a brown coyote. He believes the simplest ways are the best, as opposed to the more creative and elaborate schemes the other foxes seem to favor. He is voiced by Jimmy Hibbert.

=== Recurring ===
- Rotter - A devious and unnaturally terrestrial otter who is a recurring character in some of the episodes, serving as a middle man between the foxes and the farmyard animals. Rotter craves for chicken eggs instead of fish and small mammals like a real-world otter. He believes that he is a skilled egg thief and has even tried plotting on turning the foxes and chickens against each other for his own benefit, but is often found out before he can fulfil his plans. He also has a romantic interest in a female otter, named Carlotta, who occasionally has even outsmarted him. He is voiced by Jimmy Hibbert.
- Icky - Ransome, Sims and Jeffries' older brother. Icky is constantly envious of his sisters taking all of the glory for tackling the fox problem on the farm. He is rather clumsy and easily gets carried away. This leads to him getting into a fight with King Voracious, only for his sisters to rescue him. He is voiced by Rob Rackstraw.
- Dog - The farmer's sheepdog who has a good relationship with all of the farmyard animals, and as such is in command of the farmer's sheep. He is usually seen with the farmer. He was elected to be the leader of the farm by a landslide (his opponents were Ransome and Sims respectively), but soon resigned when he realized he could not fulfill the promises he made, and subsequently handed the role of leader back to the Foxbusters. He is voiced by Jimmy Hibbert.
- Farmer Farmer - The constantly cheerful owner of Foxearth Farm, Farmer Farmer is totally oblivious to the fox problem in the nearby forest and the fact that three of his chickens can fly. He spends most of his time with his dog, lazing about and eating picnics in the nearby fields, but is occasionally seen doing farmwork. He is voiced by Rob Rackstraw.

== Cast ==
- Whoopi Goldberg - Ransome
- Jane Horrocks - Jeffries
- Joanna Lumley - Sims/Evita/Voracity
- Rob Rackstraw - Voracious/Attila/Icky/Farmer Farmer/Various others
- Jimmy Hibbert - Todd/Volpone/Rotter/Dog/Ghengis/Various others

== Pilot ==
On the beginning of the Foxbusters Pilot, the series was originally going to be set during the Second World War as evident in the 1997 Pilot, but due to unknown reasons this idea was phased out: as evident in some episodes, the series is clearly set during the present day. Ransome and Jeffries in the pilot appears similar from the book.

=== Series 1 (1999) ===
No. overall	No. in series	Title	Original release date
1	1	"Hen Night"	9 September 1999; 12 March 2000 (Super RTL)
At a party, Sims finds the charming Cockrel Wilby who lures her to the treacherous foxes. Ransome soon rescues Sims and the Foxbusters to repel the fox invasion.
2	2	"Where Egos Dare"	16 September 1999; 12 March 2000 (Super RTL)
After a lot of showing off, Ransome falls and lands herself right into the foxes, then her comrades get caught. The Foxbusters escape after they cause the foxes to squabble themselves.
3	3	"Winging It"	23 September 1999; 19 March 2000 (Super RTL)
Todd accidentally flies on a glider, which impresses the foxes and catches by the Foxbusters by surprise. On his third flight, Jeffries rescues him from the jealous King Voracious after falling down into the pond.
4	4	"Icky's Sticky Situation"	30 September 1999; 19 March 2000 (Super RTL)
Icky feels jealous of his sisters and gets himself into a challenge with the foxes. With discrete help from his sisters, Icky is convinced he beat the fox pack.
5	5	"A Fete Worse Than Death"	7 October 1999; 26 March 2000 (Super RTL)
The Farmer gets a new hen called Blue (voiced by Jane Horrocks), who is very snooty and conceited. A capture from the foxes was followed by a Foxbuster that rescues and teaches Blue a lesson.
6	6	"Follow My Leader"	14 October 1999; 26 March 2000 (Super RTL)
The sheep become in awe of Ransome for saving a lamb. Voracious uses this ruse to turn the sheep against the Foxbusters, but Dog takes care of the sheep and gets back to his job.
7	7	"The Ring Cycle"	21 October 1999; 2 April 2000 (Super RTL)
Fabio's nose ring is swiped by a magpie. As the Foxbusters pursue the magpie, the ring is tossed all around the forest going from one animal to Todd and to another until Fabio reclaims it.
8	8	"The Trojan Chicken"	28 October 1999; 2 April 2000 (Super RTL)
Rotter gives the foxes a failed passages to the barnyard via a Trojan Chicken, whilst tipping the Foxbusters in return for some eggs. When both sides see they've been duped, The foxes and Foxbusters deliver payback to Rotter.
9	9	"Going Underground"	4 November 1999; 9 April 2000 (Super RTL)
The foxes have been kidnapping rabbits and forcing them to dig a tunnel to the farmyard. Sims seems to be acting a bit odd as the Foxbusters go down the tunnel. The girls gets trapped in one of the tunnels and it's revealed that Sims has Claustrophobia. Moleier soon comes to rescue them along with a young rabbit called Billy and they all thwart the foxes' scheme.
10	10	"See The Dog, See The Dog Run"	11 November 1999; 9 April 2000 (Super RTL)
A long democratic campaign battle ends up with Dog winning the leadership of the Foxbusters, which backfires when the foxes come for their gain. The Foxbusters regain their positions and fight off the fox invasion.
11	11	"The Long Walk Home"	18 November 1999; 16 April 2000 (Super RTL)
During a night mission, Sims breaks her wing. To reinforce the team spirit of the Foxbusters, Ransome and Jeffries agreed to walk back to the farm with her - not knowing what dangers await them.
12	12	"Three Hens And A Baby"	25 November 1999; 16 April 2000 (Super RTL)
The little fox cub Genghis strays from the fox pack and ends up at the farmyard and regards Sims as his mother. After the foxes pay a ridiculous way to the Foxbusters, Sims reluctantly hands back Genghis to King Voracious.
13	13	"Passing The Buck"	2 December 1999; 23 April 2000 (Super RTL)
When David Deer comes to live on the farm to avoid being bullied by the foxes, the chickens end up shuffling the animals around the farm to avoid any conflicts.

=== Series 2 (2000) ===
No. overall	No. in series	Title	Original release date
14	1	"Ackluckalypse Now"	1 September 2000; 23 April 2000 (Super RTL)
A secret mission for the foxes to find a legendary chicken goes wrong.
15	2	"Big Trouble"	8 September 2000; 30 April 2000 (Super RTL)
Sims' new invention accidentally makes King Voracious huge and Ransome tiny and Jeffries, until they end up in outer space. After an escalating growth battle between Sims, Jeffries and Voracious and Ransome coming face-to-face with an ant, a spider, two gems and some atoms, they grow the earth to fit their scale.
16	3	"Day Of The Hunter"	15 September 2000; 30 April 2000 (Super RTL)
Hunter Hawk is about to have the Foxbusters get grounded, but they thwart his attempt. Ransome seems to have taking a liking to Hunter until she realized he's been used by the foxes. They then have to rescue Hunter's wife and child from the foxes.
17	4	"Fear Of Flying"	22 September 2000; 7 May 2000 (Super RTL)
Sims and Jeffries are confused when Ransome starts acting strangely, and discovered that the reason behind her behavior is that she has been hypnotized.
18	5	"The Not So Great Escape"	29 September 2000; 7 May 2000 (Super RTL
Todd gets taken by accident into the farm. He has no luck escaping and ends up being staying there mistaken for a chicken.
19	6	"Love Bites"	6 October 2000; 14 May 2000 (Super RTL)
The Foxbusters gets all the foxes and vixens to fall in love to create a ceasefire, but it only improves their efforts against the chickens. The Foxbusters get the couples to break up.
20	7	"Eggs, Lies And Videotape"	13 October 2000; 14 May 2000 (Super RTL
A zoologist is astounded by the flying Foxbuster hens. The Foxbusters try to avoid a flying pose for the zoologist's camera until they give him a "Flying Foxes" scene to film.
21	8	"Of Mice And Hen"	20 October 2000; 21 May 2000 (Super RTL)
Jeffries is starting to feel overlooked by the presentation from the fox pack. She goes on a freelance mission to rescue a field mice from an owl. After she rescues them, they all rescue Sims and Ransome from the foxes.
22	9	"Some Like It Otter"	27 October 2000; 21 May 2000 (Super RTL)
Carlotta is through with Rotter and moves in with the Foxbusters. Rotter uses this as an opportunity to grab some eggs from the foxes. Then Carlotta double crosses everybody.
23	10	"The PrisHener"	3 November 2000; 28 May 2000 (Super RTL)
Ransome has been taken away to an automatic farm, which acts like a prisoner. While there she befriends a chicken named Five. All Ransome's attempts to escape fail until she makes the systems go haywire.
24	11	"Peace"	10 November 2000; 28 May 2000 (Super RTL)
King Voracious has had enough of chicken fighting and declares peace with the Foxbusters and foxes, but both Sims and Volpone break it all up.
25	12	"One Paw In The Grave"	17 November 2000; 5 June 2000 (Super RTL)
The foxes hatch another scheme to catch with the Foxbusters, while old Volpone is left with the unpopular task of babysitting Ghengis. Insisting that 'the old ways are best', Volpone sets off with Ghengis to prove it.
26	13	"In The Beak-ginning"	24 November 2000; 5 June 2000 (Super RTL)
Sims tells an ugly duckling story of how she and her sisters were raised by the traditionalist parents and became a disgrace to the farmyard due to their flying talent, but later gained their placed after rescuing the hens from the fox pack and gained the title as The Foxbusters.

== International broadcasts ==
Country	Network
Australia	Nickelodeon; ABC; ABC Kids
Republic of Ireland	RTÉ Two (The Den)
South Africa	K-T.V. World
New Zealand	TV2; TV3
Italy	Toon Disney; Italia 1
Singapore	Kids Central
Israel	Arutz HaYeladim
Germany	BFBS (Room 785)
France	France 3 (Les Minikeums)
Serbia	Happy TV

== Home video releases ==
On January 13, 2003, Cinema Club and Granada Media released 2 DVDs and videos of The Foxbusters worldwide, one with episodes 1–6 of the first series, and one with episodes 7-13. So far, the second series has not been made available on home video and currently not been released on DVD.
