= Neil Mossey =

British comedy writer and television producer

Neil Mossey is a British comedy writer and television producer.

His credits include Bounty Hamster (ITV1), My Parents Are Aliens (ITV1), The RDA with John Gordillo (BBC Choice) and RI:SE (Channel 4).

His radio credits include "It's That Jo Caulfield Again"
