= Lucky Fred =

2011 Spanish TV series or program

- Genre: Science fiction Comedy; Action-adventure
- Created by: Myriam Ballesteros
- Directed by: Pepo Salazar (season 1); Max Maleo (season 2); Mohan Subra (season 2)
- Voices of: Rupert Degas; Rasmus Hardiker; Elizabeth Sankey; Paul Kaye; Jules de Jongh; David Max Freedman; Beth Chalmers
- Theme music composer: John Gladstone Smith
- Composers: John Gladstone Smith (season 1); Anna Rice (season 2); Sarah Lynch (season 2); Gregory Magee (season 2)
- Countries of origin: Spain; Italy (season 1); Philippines (season 1); Ireland (season 2); India (season 2)
- Original languages: Spanish; Catalan; English
- No. of seasons: 2
- No. of episodes: 104

Production
- Executive producers: Sergi Reitg; Oriol Sala-Patau; Xavier Romero; Annita Romanelli (season 1); Jayakumar P. (season 2); Paul Cummins (season 2); Ajay Singh (season 2); Dani López (season 2); Elisabeth Méndez (season 2)
- Producers: Stella Dearing (season 1); Novie Rubio (season 1); Renjini Muralikrishnan (season 2); Cathy Ní Flaithearta (season 2); Rathan Sam George (season 2); Saravana Kumar (season 2)
- Running time: 12 minutes
- Production companies: Imira Entertainment; Top Draw Animation (season 1); Rai Fiction (season 1); Televisió de Catalunya; Telegael (season 2); Toonz Entertainment (season 2)

Original release
- Network: Disney Channel; Nickelodeon; Televisió de Catalunya
- Release: November 1, 2011 – March 11, 2018

Lucky Fred is an animated series created by Myriam Ballesteros and is a co-production between Imira Entertainment, Televisió de Catalunya, RAI Fiction and Top Draw Animation, in collaboration with Disney Channel Spain. It debuted on Disney Channel Spain and Nickelodeon Latin America on November 1, 2011. The show was targeted to a 6–12 year old audience.

== Plot ==
Fred Luckpuig, a 13-year-old boy living in Barcelona, Spain, is accidentally hit by a robot during a crash landing from space, which he named Friday. The robot, who poses the ability to transform into any electronic device, imprints on Fred, having to follow his orders. It was sent by the Protectors, a secret organisation which protects the galaxy, including Earth, from dangers and evil aliens, to become partner of one of its best secret operatives, agent Brains, also known under her cover name Brianna, who is a brilliant 13-year-old girl, and Fred's neighbour and classmate. She allows him to keep the robot in secret, provided she will be able to use it for her missions fighting with evil aliens.

== Cast ==
- Rupert Degas as Fred Luckpuig (season 1), Super Commander (season 1)
- Rasmus Hardiker as Fred Luckpuig (season 2)
- Elizabeth Sankey as Agent Brains, Mort
- Paul Kaye as Friday (season 1)
- Giles New as Friday (season 2), Super Commander (season 2)
- Beth Chalmers as Corky, Principal Darling, Roberta Robeaux, Egghead
- Jules de Jongh as Nora (season 1), Sir Percival, Annie
- Jess Freeman as Nora (season 2)
- David Freedman as Eddie

== Distribution and recognition ==
The show was distributed in more than 150 countries and territories. It won Best Animated Television Program by a jury of children at the 2011 Chicago International Children's Film Festival and had the first place in the Best Animation European Series at the 2011 Euro Film Festival in Spain.
