= Simon Blackwell =

English comedy writer and producer

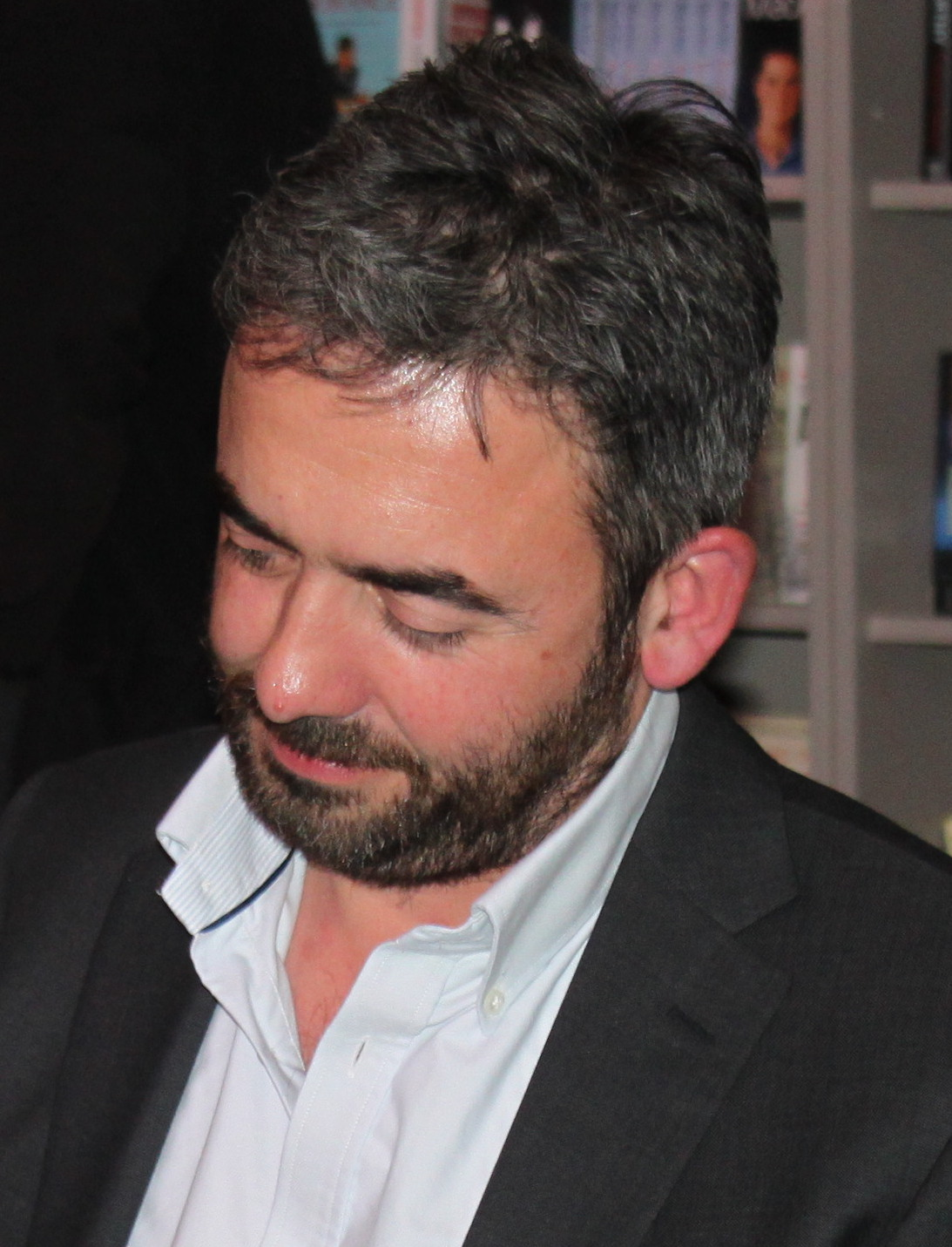
- Blackwell in 2010
- Born: Simon John Blackwell; 27 May 1966 (age 60); Battersea, London, England
- Education: Churchill College, Cambridge
- Occupation: Screenwriter
- Years active: 1999–present

Simon John Blackwell (born 27 May 1966) is an English comedy writer and producer. He is best known for his work on The Thick of It, In the Loop and Veep, and for his collaborations with Jesse Armstrong and Sam Bain on Peep Show, Four Lions and The Old Guys. Blackwell is the creator of the comedy series Back, starring David Mitchell and Robert Webb, as well as Breeders, starring Martin Freeman and Daisy Haggard.

== Career ==
After graduating from Churchill College, Cambridge as a mature student and then working as a sub-editor for magazines, Blackwell started writing TV comedy in 1999 on shows such as Have I Got News for You, The Kumars at No. 42, Alastair McGowan's Big Impression and The Armstrong and Miller Show, for which he created the duo's street-talking RAF pilot characters. He first worked with Armando Iannucci in 2003 on the topical Channel 4 show Gash. He went on to write on all four series of Iannucci's political sitcom The Thick of It and co-wrote its spin-off film In the Loop, which was nominated for an Oscar for Best Adapted Screenplay.

Other work with Iannucci includes 2004: The Stupid Version and Time Trumpet.

The two collaborated again on the HBO comedy Veep, with Blackwell co-writing the pilot episode and serving as writer and executive producer on the subsequent four seasons, for which he won two Primetime Emmy Awards.

Blackwell wrote for Chris Morris's 2010 black comedy film Four Lions, alongside Jesse Armstrong and Sam Bain. He had previously collaborated with them on the Channel 4 sitcom Peep Show and BBC One's The Old Guys.

In 2016, Blackwell created the sitcom Back starring David Mitchell and Robert Webb. It premiered on Channel 4 on 6 September 2017.

In 2020, Blackwell created the dramedy Breeders, starring Martin Freeman and Daisy Haggard. The series premiered on the American cable network FX on 2 March 2020, and on Sky One on 12 March 2020.

== Filmography ==
=== Film ===
Title	Year	Functioned as			Notes
Title	Year	Writer	Producer	Other	Notes
In the Loop	2009	Yes			
Four Lions	2010			Yes	Additional material
The Personal History of David Copperfield	2019	Yes			

=== Television ===
Title	Year	Functioned as			Notes
Title	Year	Writer	Producer	Other	Notes
The Jim Tavaré Show	1999	Yes			7 episodes
The 11 O'Clock Show	1999–2000	Yes			5 episodes
Bremner, Bird and Fortune	1999–2003	Yes			
The Big Impression	2000	Yes			
Lum The Invader Girl	2000			Yes	Script editor (BBC Dub)
Way to Go	2001	Yes			
Aaagh! It's the Mr. Hell Show!	2001–2002	Yes			10 episodes
The Kumars at No. 42	2001–2002	Yes			
Live Floor Show	2002	Yes			Episode: #2.8
Dead Ringers	2002–2007	Yes			
Life Beyond the Box: Norman Stanley Fletcher	2003			Yes	Script advisor
Gash	2003	Yes			4 episodes
Bounty Hamster	2003	Yes			7 episodes
The Sketch Show	2003–2004			Yes	Additional writer
Christmas Night with the Stars	2004	Yes			Television special
The Impressionable Jon Culshaw	2004	Yes			6 episodes
2004: The Stupid Version	2004	Yes			Television special
Monkey Trousers	2005	Yes			5 episodes
The Comic Side of 7 Days	2005	Yes			
Graham Norton's Bigger Picture	2005	Yes			
The Thick of It	2005–2012	Yes			21 episodes
Time Trumpet	2006	Yes			2 episodes
Hyperdrive	2007			Yes	Script associate
Dogface	2007	Yes			Episode: #1.2
Moving Wallpaper	2008	Yes			2 episodes
Mumbai Calling	2008	Yes			3 episodes
Peep Show	2008–2012	Yes			4 episodes
The Old Guys	2009–2010	Yes	Associate	Yes	Also co-creator
The Armstrong & Miller Show	2009–2010	Yes			17 episodes
Whites	2010			Yes	Script editor
Parents	2012			Yes	Script editor
Veep	2012–2015	Yes	Executive		13 episodes
Trying Again	2014	Yes	Co-executive	Yes	Also co-creator
Back	2017–2021	Yes	Executive	Yes	Also creator
Breeders	2020–2023	Yes	Executive		Also creator

== See also ==
- List of Academy Award winners and nominees from Great Britain
