= Aaagh! It's the Mr. Hell Show! =

2001 animated television show

- Genre: Sketch comedy
- Created by: David Freedman; Alan Gilbey
- Written by: Joel Jessup; Hugh MacLeod; Simon Blackwell; Roger Drew; Will Smith; Colin Yardley; Joe Dator; Nick Ostler; Olly Smith
- Directed by: Andy Bartlett; John Pagan; Tim Stuby; Rob Boutilier; Michael Grimshaw; Keith Ingham; Paul Boyd
- Starring: Bob Monkhouse; Paul Dobson; Philip Maurice Hayes; Scott McNeil; Gerard Plunkett; Tabitha St. Germain; Michael Dobson; Nicole Oliver; Jeff "Swampy" Marsh; Graham Andrews; Ellie King; Pauline Newstone; Sally Grace; Catherine Woods; Jonathan Lloyd Walker; Cathy Weseluck
- Music by: Mark Sayer-Wade
- Countries of origin: United Kingdom; Canada
- Original language: English
- No. of series: 1
- No. of episodes: 13

Production
- Executive producers: Christopher J. Brough; Gareth Edwards; David Freedman; Alan Gilbey; Myfanwy Moore; Jon Plowman
- Producer: J. Falconer
- Running time: 25 minutes
- Production companies: Peafur Productions; Sextant Entertainment Group

Original release
- Network: BBC Two
- Release: 28 October 2001 – 18 February 2002

Aaagh! It's the Mr. Hell Show! is an animated skitcom television show that aired on BBC Two from 28 October 2001 to 18 February 2002. The show was created by David Freedman and Alan Gilbey after the greeting card created by the cartoonist Hugh MacLeod. The basic format was a series of sketches linked by the eponymous Mr. Hell, a Satan-esque host voiced by comedian Bob Monkhouse (which is the last series before his death in 2003). Mr. Hell delights in making his guests as miserable as possible, and also discusses his own personal problems, to add to the general sense of desolation.

Notable characters in the series include Josh, voiced by Jeff "Swampy" Marsh, who attempts to start a discussion about reincarnation before inevitably getting killed, and Serge the Fashion Industry Seal of Death (an anthropomorphic harp seal with a French Canadian accent), who wants to take revenge on the fashion industry for killing his parents. Mr. Hell also regularly appears in his own sketches, some featuring his illegitimate son Damien, and Damien's mother Angela, an angel.

== Episodes ==
Episode no.	Title	Original release date
1	"Mr. Hell Moves In"	28 October 2001
Mr. Hell discusses the "C" word – Commitment. We slowly meet Champion the Wonder Snail, and tempt a lawsuit as we spoof four lovable teens and their ever-hungry hound, as they discover that not all ghosts are harmless caretakers.
2	"Edukashun"	4 November 2001
See a man cut off his own eyelids with scissors... and laugh! See Mr. Hell go to a school and the Victorian Lady Detective go to pot. Well, opium actually.
3	"Triple Indemnity Squared"	11 November 2001
We learn to trust a worm, get Jurasskicked by a silly dinosaur rapper and Mr. Hell meets his match. John, if you're reading this, I've still got your wife.
4	"From Here to Paternity"	18 November 2001
Mr. Hell meets his long lost son, the Victorian Lady Detective meets Jack the Ripper and Josh the Reincarnation Guy meets his maker again... and again... and again.
5	"Big Buzznizz"	3 December 2001
More seal slaughtering from Serge, some singing corpses and Mr. Hell finally gets a job. Scorpios – this month is a bad one for you. Stay in.
6	"Right Royal Rain Rin Re Rass/Mr. Hell Takes Buckingham Palace"	9 December 2001
Our hero mounts the British throne and Serge the Seal mounts other things. Plus "Wolicking wizards, its Harry Nutter!" This week's winning numbers were 7, 23 and 89. The winning colour was Teal.
7	"Hellathon"	16 December 2001
Give! Give! Give! It's the Hellathon Special! Make your pledge now on 666-666-6667 (all calls charged at local rates and the loss of your immortal soul). Plus Serge the Seal meets the true spirit of Christmas, and shoots it.
8	"The Animation Special"	6 January 2002
Mr. Hell takes us on a guided history of animation, gets annoyed at the budgets of other shows and tortures stick figures. Plus the horror story Oscar Wilde would have penned if he hadn't been so talented; the bone chilling, butt jiggling tale of "The Photocopy of Dorian Gray's Arse".
9	"Run Like Hell"	13 January 2002
Serge the Seal of Death decimates London Fashion Week, the serial killer who keeps changing his gimmick strikes again and Mr Hell wakes up with an election... and other bad puns.
10	"Prince Not So Charming"	20 January 2002
This week things get pretty Grimm, as Mr. Hell teaches us that fairy tales can come true, but not for you. Plus Thomas the Tank, Tommy Tomorrow, The Telltale Phone and other things beginning with T.
11	"Deep Thought - or - Shallow Hell"	28 January 2002
Mr. Hell ponders life's deep philosophical questions and makes more nob gags. Plus Serge the Seal meets Karlsberg Lagertop. This week's secret word is "Trebor." Mark Katz, you owe me a phone call.
12	"Blinded by Science and Rosy Palmer"	11 February 2002
Mr. Hell investigates the fascinating intellectual world of science and makes some nob gags. Plus, for all you pet lovers, we release laboratory animals into the wild and then watch them suffer.
13	"The Seven Ages... of Parties"	18 February 2002
Unlucky for some – every third viewer of this show will be bit by a doberman. But for the rest of you it's all fun as Mr. Hell gatecrashes the parties of your life. Break open a beer and belch with us to celebrate the last show!

== Awards ==
- 2001 Houston World Festival Platinum Remi Award winner
- 2001 Leo Award winner for Best Animation Program or Series
- 2002 Gemini Award winner for Best Animated Program or Series
