= David Freedman (screenwriter) =

American writer, producer and director

David Max Freedman (born 1965) is an American writer, producer and director. He is well known as the co-creator of the British animated adult comedy television series Aaagh! It's the Mr. Hell Show! for the BBC.

== Early life ==
Freedman was born in Plattsburgh, New York and went to The School of Visual Arts in New York City. He now lives in the UK. Freedman worked for over 9 years in a writing partnership with Alan Gilbey. They developed and co-created a few cult cartoon classics including Foxbusters, Bounty Hamster and the multi award-winning Aaagh! It's the Mr. Hell Show! which was co-produced at Peafur Productions with Barry Baker, Ben Bowen, Baljeet Rai and Jeff "Swampy" Marsh co-creator of Phineas and Ferb.

Contributed to The Danny Baker Show for 10 episodes,

Directed Lucy Porter 3 webisodes 'Lucy Loves you' for the now defunct ComedyDemon.com, with the highest watched video, 'Sex' before the website closed

== Credits ==
=== Writer ===
- Unstable (pre-production)
- When Marnie Was There - screenplay adaptation: English version
- The Magic Snowflake - screenplay - dialogue
- Sokator-442 - TV Movie
- Bounty Hamster - co-creator with Alan Gilbey with Silver Fox Films
- Aaagh! It's the Mr. Hell Show based on an original character by Hugh MacLeod of gapingvoid.com - Co-creator with Alan Gilbey
- So Many Santas - TV Short
- Foxbusters - co-developer and writer for Cosgrove Hall Films
- The First Snow of Winter - short - script
- Rex the Runt - co-developer and co-writer with Alan Gilbey and Richard Golly Goleszowski for Aardman Animations
- Dennis the Menace - writer - TV Series - three episodes: Monster Menace, Snowbound, Adventures in Dennis Sitting for Collingwood O'Hare, DC Thomson and HIT Entertainment
- The Old Lady and the Pigeons - short - dialogue
- The Danny Baker Show - TV Series - additional material - 10 episodes
- Pirates - TV Series
- Only Yesterday - English version
- Ronja the Robber's Daughter - English dub

=== Director ===
- Groove High - series director for Disney Channel (United Kingdom and Ireland)
- King Arthur's Disasters - season 2 - series director for CITV
- Ronja the Robber's Daughter - English dub

=== Producer ===
- Legend of the Dragon - producer for BKN
- Bounty Hamster - co-creator with Alan Gilbey with Silver Fox Films
- Aaagh! It's the Mr. Hell Show! based on an original character by Hugh MacLeod of gapingvoid.com - Co-creator with Alan Gilbey
- So Many Santas - TV short

=== Music composer ===
- PJ Masks - theme music composer

=== Miscellaneous ===
- Lucky Fred - voice director for Disney Channel and voice of Eddie
- Bob and Margaret - script consultant: one episode for Channel 4, Comedy Central and Nelvana
