= Bounty Hamster =

2003 British-New Zealand comic science fiction animated series

- Genre: Action; Adventure; Comedy; Science fiction Thriller
- Created by: David Max Freedman; Alan Gilbey
- Directed by: Graham Ralph
- Voices of: Alan Marriott; Juliet Cowan; Jerome Blake; Matthew Goode; Gary Martin; Kate Sachs
- Composers: Rick Cassman; Vyv Hope-Scott
- Countries of origin: United Kingdom; New Zealand
- No. of seasons: 1
- No. of episodes: 26 (6 unaired)

Production
- Running time: 11 minutes
- Production companies: Peafur Productions; Silver Fox; Winchester Television; Slightly Off Beat Productions

Original release
- Network: ITV (CITV)
- Release: 9 January – 22 May 2003

Bounty Hamster is a 2003 animated comic science fiction created by David Max Freedman and Alan Gilbey. The series was produced by Peafur Productions, Silver Fox, and Slightly Off Beat Productions for Winchester Television and CITV. It also aired on Cartoon Network in Italy and Disney Channel in France.

The episode "Free Lenny" was nominated for the TV Series for Children award at the Bradford Animation Festival in November 2002. The series was nominated for a BAFTA Award in 2003.

== Plot ==
Cassie Harrison, a 13-year-old girl, is searching the universe for her father after he was kidnapped by space pirates. To help her, she enlists the aid of an alien bounty hunter she can afford, who is actually a blue hamster named Marion. They have an odd-couple style relationship and search the universe together for Cassie's father.

The blue space ship the pair use is divided into two parts, a driving cockpit which can be detached in order to fly down to a planet in a similar manner to a jolly boat from a vessel, and a larger booster component which is attached on top of the small driving compartment. Scenes involving driving often show large objects and rooms that appear within the ship. The name of the ship is Keith.

Running gags include Marion pulling many, or odd, objects from his cheeks as if they are large pockets. In one instance he pulls out a large assortment of objects to help him and Cassie when they are falling off a cliff and this includes a cruise ship. Also, one of the science fiction references is the gag in which C-3PO from Star Wars appears in the ship and Cassie asks who he is.

Every episode starts with a brief explanation of the basic running plot and features a sequence showing Cassie's father being taken away. This is followed by a short sequence showing Marion being uncovered from a "tough" armoured outfit and standing on stilts. The next sequence features the screen divided into four quarters, each showing several different scenes from episodes. The credits culminate in Marion uttering a fierce growl. The closing credits show an image of stars in space. The tune to the theme sounds like the words "bounty hamster" but with notes to a 3-4 beat.

Despite airing in a children's timeslot, the show has quite a broad appeal, containing frequent science fiction references, in-jokes and puns, as well as nods to other movies and TV series. Marion's name and eyepatch is a parody of John Wayne and the character he played in True Grit. The show's premise is also based on True Grit – a young girl loses her father and then hires a bounty hunter.

== Characters ==
- Marion, the hamster (voiced by Alan Marriott) – Marion is a 6-inch-high (150 mm) blue talking hamster. He wears an eyepatch on his right eye (purely for aesthetic reasons, as he has both eyes) and can fit all manner of objects within his cheek cavities. He is often outraged by stronger characters calling him "cute" and tries to defend his personality despite his feminine name and small structure and this is when he says his catchphrase, "Don't call me CUTE!" before going berserk. He is often seen as being clumsy or forgetful, with the exception of comedic instances, such as when he remembers to use a remote-controlled locking device on his space ship.
- Cassie Harrison (voiced by Juliet Cowan) – Cassie (short for Cassiopeia) has dirty blonde hair and is usually the more rational of the pair. She is constantly searching for her father and complaining about Marion's foolishness.
- Additional character voices: Jerome Blake, Matthew Goode, Gary Martin, Kate Sachs.

== Episodes ==
No.	Title	Written by	Original release date
1	"Night of the Hunters"	Olly Smith	9 January 2003
After Marion's failed attempt at getting information, Cassie decides to advertise for bounty hunters to find her missing father, but they mistake them for wanted posters and Marion and Cassie try to stop them before the hunt starts.
2	"Somewhere That's Green"	David Freedman & Alan Gilbey	16 January 2003
After Marion accidentally ejects all the food and water supplies from the ship, he and Cassie are left drifting in space, slowly starving to death, until they unexpectedly stumble across an environmental dome guarded by a fiercely protective plant growing robot.
3	"Chin Raider"	Dan Chambers, Mark Huckerby, & Nick Ostler	23 January 2003
Marion and Cassie, while on the run, crash land on a nearby planet where a secret order of bat monks worship the oracle, The Almighty Chin, whilst a treasure hunter seeks to steal it.
4	"Dog Day"	Dan Chambers, Mark Huckerby, & Nick Ostler	30 January 2003
Cassie receives a distress signal from a wrecked space station. Once there, Marion and Cassie discover a robotic puppy, of which Cassie calls Spot and decides to keep. However, the duo both discover that Spot has constructive and destructive tendencies.
5	"Just Deserts"	Olly Smith	6 February 2003
In a lost bet, Marion has lost Cassie to be Abnormality Jane's slave. Marion's efforts to get Cassie back fail, until he befriends a monster to dispose of Jane.
6	"Trading Spaces"	David Freedman & Alan Gilbey	13 February 2003
A fleeing criminal posing as a spaceship inspector comes on board the duo's ship and switches bodies with Cassie, leaving her in a dangerous chase with a bounty hunter. Cassie and Marion catch wind of this and nab the body swapper.
7	"The Good, the Bad and the Adorable"	David Freedman & Alan Gilbey	20 February 2003
Cassie and Marion arrive on a planet, hailed as heroes by the Humbles having driven away a bully, but he is coming back with his gang. The only thing that will ready those inept Humbles is singing.
8	"Lonely Planet"	Simon Blackwell & Roger Drew	27 February 2003
The planet Cassie and Marion land on is the living planet Walter, who can help Cassie if she summons inhabitants to him. Their plan is successful, but Walter has duped them the whole time.
9	"Forget Me Knot"	David Freedman & Alan Gilbey	6 March 2003
On Gulgathar XIII, Cassie and Marion follow the trail of a devious manager who is draining people's brain power to sell on the black market. After a brief battle, they restore the city of its brains.
10	"Bringing up Baby"	Simon Blackwell	13 March 2003
A lady entrusts Cassie to take care of her baby. Unfortunately the baby is rapidly aging every minute, but this age changing is revealed to be a natural phase of these alien bears.
11	"Off to Work"	Simon Blackwell	20 March 2003
Still stranded on Gulgathar XIII, Cassie and Marion work their way to buy a new ship, but Marion accidentally divides his personality into several individual beings. It is only a matter of time before the side effects can do real damage.
12	"Free Lenny"	David Freedman & Alan Gilbey	27 March 2003
At a junk ship store, Cassie and Marion rescue a scrapper robot Lenny from his abusive owner. Lenny gets the duo in trouble the more he follows them. After Lenny gets destroyed, they find he had in him, the duo's ship the whole time.
13	"Save the Whale"	Olly Smith	3 April 2003
A space whale Bertha is transporting a stolen atomic bomb, which will soon detonate. Cassie and Marion board the cargo hold and carry out the difficult task of defusing the bomb.
14	"Wish You Were Here"	Simon Blackwell	10 April 2003
A mysterious space nebula causes Cassie and Marion to be reunited with their families. They discover this force is only fooling their senses caused by a lonesome being who desires eternal company.
15	"Beached"	Dan Chambers, Mark Huckerby, & Nick Ostler	17 April 2003
Cassie and Marion are stranded on in a strange place and Marion meets his old friend Raymore, who reveals they are in the stomach of a giant space slug. The duo escape, but Raymore feels more at home with the space slug.
16	"Fashion Victim"	Dan Chambers, Mark Huckerby, & Nick Ostler	24 April 2003
A designer Claude le Fraude finds Cassie the perfect model and she accepts in hope her father will notice. Claude's true intention is fattening his models for a feast. The duo are rescued by the service bouncer.
17	"Frozen Stiffed"	Simon Blackwell	1 May 2003
On Swapsi XVII, Marion has swapped the duo's ship for an ice asteroid, which the devious manager is out to melt. Bertha assists them on their dangerous delivery.
18	"Mutiny on the Bounty Hamster"	Simon Blackwell	8 May 2003
Cassie and Marion board a space liner which has been overtaken by mutinous robots. The duo lead the crew to counter revolution the robots and successfully shut them down.
19	"Screaming Blue Murder"	Simon Blackwell	15 May 2003
Marion goes detective to find the culprit who is disabling the robots of the space liner. Marion pins Cassie for the culprit, granting the opportunity to expose the first presumed victim robot as the actual culprit.
20	"The Lost World"	Dan Chambers, Mark Huckerby, & Nick Ostler	22 May 2003
Cassie and Marion lose themselves in the Lost World beyond a black hole. Later they are on the run from lost bounty hunters, but they escape by mysterious methods.
21	"Planet of the Japes"	Mark Huckerby & Nick Ostler	Unaired
Cassie and Marion are brought to Prankaria, a planet inhabited by monkey jokers. Marion becomes their king. Cassie makes a mistake by helping the anti-prankster monkeys. The duo depart to avoid further intervention.
22	"Twin Cheeks"	Neil Mossey & Rob Venes	Unaired
A thief with an uncanny resemblance to Marion has stolen a dimensional device and shelters in the duo's ship. They are pursued by an alternate Cassie who captures the wrong Marion, but Cassie rescues him.
23	"Monster Island"	David Freedman & Alan Gilbey	Unaired
On a planet, a city of miniature bunnies convict giant monsters and Cassie also gets caught. Marion teams up with a monster-loving bunny to liberate them, but the duo turn against them to stop them from destroying the city.
24	"Gone Fishin'"	David Freedman & Alan Gilbey	Unaired
On a hostile planet, the duo are taken by desert pirates and Marion becomes their new captain. As they go after the great white worm, Captain Reeham tries to reclaim his place, but Cassie conquers him.
25	"School's Out"	Alan Gilbey	Unaired
Leaving off the part where the duo cause a stir on Nautia MMM, Student Cassie feels like a misfit due to her space fantasy. Marion reveals they are in some mental prison and the duo manage to break out of it.
26	"The Trial"	Alan Gilbey	Unaired
In a very special series finale clip show, Marion has to stand trial for his various misdeeds as a bounty hunter. Notes: Due to budget cuts at the network, this episode is entirely made up of clips from past episodes, with most of the lines overdubbed with new dialogue. The series ends with Marion's bounty licence being given to Cassie.

In addition, "A.I. (Artificial Idiocy)", an episode between "The Lost World" and "Planet of the Japes" was originally slated to air as episode 21; but due to budget cuts at ITV, the episode was never made and was replaced by "The Trial", a low-budget clip show episode. According to co-creator Alan Gilbey, the episode would have involved a past friend of Marion now hunting the duo down in a starship.
