= The First Snow of Winter =

- Written by: Graham Ralph; Alan Gilbey; David Freedman
- Directed by: Graham Ralph
- Starring: Miriam Margolyes; Dermot Morgan; Kate Sachs; Sorcha Cusack; Neil McCaul
- Theme music composer: Tolga Kashif; The Music Sculptors; Mark Sayer-Wade
- Country of origin: United Kingdom
- Original language: English

Production
- Executive producers: Claire Derry; David Hamilton; Theresa Plummer-Andrews
- Producer: Jackie Edwards
- Running time: 28 minutes
- Production companies: Hibbert Ralph Entertainment; Link Entertainment

Original release
- Network: BBC
- Release: 25 December 1998

The First Snow of Winter is a British animated television film produced by Hibbert Ralph Entertainment and Link Entertainment and was first broadcast on BBC1 on 25 December 1998. The film features the voices of Miriam Margolyes, Dermot Morgan, Sorcha Cusack, Kate Sachs and Neil McCaul. It was released on video in 1998 by BBC Worldwide in the United Kingdom and 1999 by Columbia TriStar Home Video in the United States.

It was dedicated to Dermot Morgan, who died before the film was released.

== Plot ==
The story takes place in 20th century Ireland. Winter is approaching and ducks are starting their migration south. A young and daring white duck named Sean McDuck decides to slide down a hill and cross over to the other side of a stream, despite warnings from his young puffin friend, Puffy. When Sean reaches the other side, Puffy tells him about a red fox, which Sean narrowly escapes. When Sean and his family migrate, he gets lost trying to chase some seagulls. Later, he is hit by an airplane and becomes stranded with a broken wing. His family thinks he has been killed by the fox when Sean's mother sees her with her kits playing with white feathers.

A kindly tympanic water vole named Voley is preparing for his winter hibernation but stops to help Sean get ready for the cold weather ahead. Voley also teaches Sean to play a simple blade of grass as a musical instrument and even does an Irish stepdance with Sean and a chorus line of sheep. Despite Sean's wishes for him to remain, Voley soon heads off to start his hibernation. After struggling through the first night of a snowy blizzard warning and having to take shelter in a Wellington boot, Sean discovers that Puffy was also left behind.

For the rest of the winter, the two friends keep each other company. When spring comes, Sean and Puffy eagerly look for their families. The two friends are then cornered by the fox and eventually end up on a boat, but are rescued by Voley while Sean manages to drive away the fox, regaining his ability to fly in the process. Shortly afterward, Sean and Puffy are happily reunited with their families as Sean stepdances with Voley.

== Voice cast ==
- Voley – Dermot Morgan (UK Version)
- Voley – Tim Curry (US Version)
- Mother Duck – Sorcha Cusack (UK Version)
- Mother Duck – Carol Kane (US Version)
- Sean McDuck – Miriam Margolyes (UK Version)
- Sean McDuck – Ashley Johnson (US Version)
- Father Duck – Neil McCaul (UK and US Version)
- Puffy – Kate Sachs (UK and US Version)
