= Me and Mrs Jones (TV series) =

- Genre: Sitcom
- Written by: Oriane Messina; Fay Rusling
- Directed by: Nick Hurran
- Opening theme: "Busy" by Olly Murs
- Composer: Mark Russell
- Country of origin: United Kingdom
- Original language: English
- No. of series: 1
- No. of episodes: 6

Production
- Executive producers: Beryl Vertue; Gregor Sharp
- Producer: Serena Cullen
- Running time: 30 minutes
- Production company: Hartswood Films

Original release
- Network: BBC One
- Release: 12 October – 23 November 2012

Me and Mrs Jones is a British comedy about the life of a woman named Gemma Jones. The first series began on 12 October 2012 on BBC One. It stars Sarah Alexander and Neil Morrissey.

On 10 December 2012, it was announced that the comedy would not return for a second series.

== Synopsis ==
Gemma Jones is the mother of twin daughters Charlotte and Jess and adult son Alfie. The show follows Gemma's life as she navigates relationships with Tom, the father of one her daughters' playmates, and Billy, a friend of Alfie's.

== Cast ==
- Sarah Alexander – Gemma Jones – The main character of the series and the mother of Alfie, Charlotte and Jess.
- Neil Morrissey – Jason Jones – Gemma's ex-husband and Charlotte and Jess's father.
- Nathaniel Parker – Tom Marshall – Gemma's admirer and the father of Poppy.
- Robert Sheehan – Billy Delaney – Alfie's friend and one of Gemma's love interests.
- Jonathan Bailey – Alfie Jones – Gemma's son and Charlotte and Jess's older half-brother.
- Vera Filatova – Inca – Jason's girlfriend.
- Kelle Bryan – Fran – Gemma's friend.
- Katherine Jakeways – Caroline
- Danni Bennatar – Charlotte Jones – Jess's twin sister, Alfie's half sister and Gemma and Jason's daughter.
- Sophie Alibert – Jess Jones – Charlotte's twin sister, Alfie's half sister and Gemma and Jason's daughter.
- Madeleine Harris – Poppy – Tom's daughter and one of Charlotte and Jess's classmates.

== Episodes ==
No.	Title	Directed by	Written by	Original release date	UK viewers (millions)
1	"Episode 1"	Nick Hurran	Oriane Messina & Fay Rusling	12 October 2012	3.13
Gemma's life involves ferrying her twin daughters around and dealing with her ex, Jason, and his Swedish girlfriend Inca. Her life changes when her son, Alfie, returns from travelling with friend Billy and Tom asks her out on a date. Gemma unexpectedly finds she has more than one love interest.
2	"Episode 2"	Nick Hurran	Oriane Messina & Fay Rusling	19 October 2012	2.42
It is parents' evening at the school, and Gemma is struggling to get her mind off Billy. She finds herself in a disastrous teacher's meeting, where Inca takes over, and at a school play where the drama is off stage rather than on.
3	"Episode 3"	Nick Hurran	Oriane Messina & Fay Rusling	26 October 2012	2.72
Gemma finds herself at a self defense class run by Tom. When an inflamed Jason gate-crashes the class he is attacked from all sides, and Billy must decide if he can carry on living under Gemma's roof.
4	"Episode 4"	Nick Hurran	Oriane Messina & Fay Rusling	2 November 2012	2.7
It's Alfie's birthday at the bar and Gemma finds herself encouraging Billy to date another woman. Tom helps Fran pull the man of her dreams and Inca overhears some information that has a disastrous effect on her relationship with Jason.
5	"Episode 5"	Nick Hurran	Oriane Messina & Fay Rusling	9 November 2012	2.43
Tom hosts a dinner for Gemma who shows up with an uninvited guest. Much to the annoyance of a lovelorn Jason, Inca goes on a blind date at the bar where she inadvertently gives Billy some advice about love that forces him to finally confront Gemma
6	"Episode 6"	Nick Hurran	Oriane Messina & Fay Rusling	23 November 2012	1.72
A gathering at Gemma's is never a quiet affair, and between a trampoline accident, a proposal, a fire outbreak and a surprise guest, Gemma receives two tempting offers.

== Reception ==
Me and Mrs Jones was not received kindly in early reviews. Writing for The Stage, reviewer Harry Venning wrote:

Of the many unkind epithets suggested by Roget’s Thesaurus, excruciating is the one that best describes this show. Until I watched it, I did not realise it was physically possible to grit one’s teeth, curl one’s toes and clench one’s sphincter all at the same time. And stay that way for half an hour.

Metro's reviewer was somewhat kinder, calling Me and Mrs Jones "grown-up comedy with child-like humour" (going on to explain that "child-like" was more akin to "childish").

The British Comedy Guide reviewed it as follows: "We absolutely loved Me And Mrs Jones; it mightn't have had the packed-out laughs of a studio sitcom, but it oozed warmth, good humour and all-round likeability...If a second series isn't commissioned of this heart-warming, laugh-out-loud comedy, it'll be the televisual crime of the year."

== DVD release ==
Me and Mrs Jones was due for release on 26 November 2012.
