= Pinky and Perky =

British children's TV puppet series (1957–1971)

- Pinky and Perky as they appeared on their original BBC TV show
- Genre: Children's television series
- Created by: Jan Dalibor; Vlasta Dalibor
- Presented by: Jan Dalibor; Vlasta Dalibor
- Country of origin: United Kingdom
- Original language: English

Production
- Production company: Thames Television (1970–71)

Original release
- Network: BBC1 (1957–68); ITV (1970–71)
- Release: 1957 – 1971

Pinky and Perky is a children's television series first broadcast by BBC TV in 1957, and revived in 2008 as an animated adaptation.

== Background ==
The title characters are a pair of anthropomorphic singing puppet pigs, named Pinky and Perky. Pinky and Perky spoke and sang in high-pitched voices, created by re-playing original voice recordings at twice the original recorded speed; the vocals were sung by Mike Sammes. One episode of the series, "You Too Can Be a Prime Minister", was banned by the BBC for being too political; public outcry caused them to reinstate it.

In 1993, Pinky and Perky appeared regularly on The Pig Attraction, a CITV puppet-focused talk show, performing a song every week. The Pinky and Perky segments were made in collaboration with Jan and Vlasta Dalibor.

A CGI reboot of the show, titled The Pinky and Perky Show, was released in 2008. A comic strip based on the TV series was drawn by Jim Turnbull.
