= Brief Encounters (TV series) =

UK TV series (2016)

- Genre: Drama
- Created by: Oriane Messina; Fay Rusling
- Based on: Good Vibrations: The True Story of Ann Summers by Jacqueline Gold
- Written by: Oriane Messina; Fay Rusling
- Directed by: Joss Agnew; Marek Losey; Jill Robertson
- Starring: Sophie Rundle; Penelope Wilton; Angela Griffin; Sharon Rooney
- Composer: Mark Thomas
- Country of origin: United Kingdom
- Original language: English
- No. of episodes: 6

Production
- Executive producers: Danielle Lux; Arabella McGuigan; Oriane Messina; Fay Rusling; Matthew Read
- Producers: Anne-Louise Russell; Carolyn Parry-Jones; Jo Willett
- Production locations: Sheffield, United Kingdom; Cubley, United Kingdom; Penistone, United Kingdom
- Cinematography: Nick Dance; Ollie Downey; Tim Palmer
- Editors: Ben Drury, Colin Sumsion & Tim Hodges
- Running time: 45 minutes (excluding adverts)
- Production company: CPL Productions

Original release
- Network: ITV
- Release: 4 July – 8 August 2016

Related
- A Virtuous Business (2024)

Brief Encounters is a British comedy-drama series created by Oriane Messina and Fay Rusling. The series is loosely based on Gold Group International CEO Jacqueline Gold's 1995 memoir, Good Vibrations, and details the beginning of the Ann Summers retailer company, through four women who see the potential of finding happiness and fulfillment by selling lingerie and sex toys to women in the privacy of their own homes. The series was produced by CPL Productions for broadcast on ITV and aired from 4 July to 8 August 2016. Filming took place between January and April 2016 in Sheffield. It was well received by critics. The show was cancelled by ITV two months after the airing of last episode.

== Plot ==
In the early 1980s the lives of four ordinary women, their husbands, mothers, families and community are turned around when they become Ann Summers party plan saleswomen.

== Episodes ==
Episode 1 It's 1982 when Sheffield factory worker Terry Kirke loses his job. His wife Steph, who cleans for wealthy butcher's wife Pauline Spake, sees the chance to make extra money by selling saucy undies and sex aids. Despite Terry's objections and her own inhibitions, she joins fellow school run mum Nita and hairdresser Dawn, girlfriend of Pauline's husband Brian's shop boy, as salespersons but lacks a venue - until Pauline, bored by her lonely existence, offers to host the party. Pauline is initially nervous but rises to the occasion when her prudish friend Bunny objects and the evening is a success. Brian and Terry are less impressed however and Steph is shocked by Terry's subsequent actions.

Episode 2 Terry is working away after Steph discovered his infidelity and, strapped for cash, she uses some of her sales money to pay the rent. Pauline overrules Brian by allowing Dawn, who is exhausted by skivvying for her lazy father and older brothers, to be their lodger but Dawn's spiteful father Len counters by banning her from seeing little brother Stanley. Needing the money Steph agrees to host a party for Lisa, the woman she caught Terry with, organized by Lisa's innocent boyfriend Barry, who takes Steph's 5-year-old son Dean out to the cinema - and loses him, though sympathetic policeman Johnny helps Steph find him. Nita's husband Kieren meanwhile reluctantly agrees to be the getaway driver in a robbery, which spells disaster for Brian.

Episode 3 Steph goes on an overnight date with Johnny but Terry returns, vowing to make amends and, whilst both he and Steph's mother Joan know about Johnny, she agrees to a reconciliation with her husband. With Brian incapacitated after Kieren ran him over fleeing the robbery Pauline finds he is in debt to his suppliers and, to raise cash, encouraged by Dawn, hosts her first solo party which is a huge success. Returning home in triumph she finds that Dawn wants to move Stanley in after other family members have been arrested. Meanwhile, Nita learns the truth about Kieren's part in the robbery.

Episode 4 Now the family's sole earner a confident Steph confides in fellow salesperson Hellie, spirited daughter of Bunny, her ambitions for the future. She secretly goes to meet Johnny who tells her that he is an adoptee who has come to Sheffield to find his birth mother. Pauline enjoys hosting Dawn's hen party but Russell, over-awed by the wedding arrangements, seeks to call off the nuptials, being emboldened by a kindly Brian to save the situation. Nita lies to the police to save Kieren whilst Pauline disappoints Johnny and Terry puts himself on the line for Steph.

Episode 5 (broadcast 1 August 2016) Three weeks have passed and Nita's son Richie has gone missing with his father's share of the stolen money. However Nita and Kieren join the others for Dawn and Russell's wedding. At the registry office Steph gives Terry some home truths having learned that Lisa is pregnant, most likely by him, but at the reception Brian is a hero, not only acting as father of the bride to give away a grateful Dawn but buying off her real father, the hateful Len, who arrives demanding to take back Stanley. Pauline blanks Johnny whilst Nita encourages him that Steph is worth fighting for but unfortunately a real fight breaks out when Terry catches his wife kissing Johnny before storming off. Pauline lies to Johnny and then to Steph in an effort to keep the young man out of her life whilst Hellie has a confession to make to Dawn. Back home Nita is shocked when Kieren tells her that he so admired Brian's gesture at the wedding he feels he should give himself up. However they are interrupted by Richie, who has returned with an unwelcome companion.

Episode 6 Stephanie plans a big exotic lingerie event and asks the other women to help model. Nita worries about Richie working for Dougie. As tensions with Pauline come to a head, Johnny asks Stephanie for one last favour before he leaves town.

== Cast ==
- Sophie Rundle as Stephanie "Steph" Kirke
- Angela Griffin as Nita Dempsey
- Penelope Wilton as Pauline Spake (née Hadley)
- Sharon Rooney as Dawn Bundy (née Toxton)
- Peter Wight as Brian Spake
- Will Merrick as Russell Bundy
- Karl Davies as Terry Kirke
- Don Gilet as Kieran Dempsey
- Ben Bailey Smith as Jonathan "Johnny" Daniels (né Hadley)
- Chloe Pirrie as Helena "Hellie" Matlock
- Pippa Haywood as Bunny Matlock
- Samuel Edward-Cook as Dougie
- Gina Bramhill as Lisa
- Kent Riley as Barry
- Felicity Montagu as Joan

== Location ==
One of the locations of the filming was a Sheffield company, Pryor Marking Technology. Based in the centre of Sheffield, and being established since 1849, the exterior of the company is a Grade II listed building, meaning an ideal area for filming period dramas such as Brief Encounters and This Is England. Some of the shots used for Claybin & Boyd were on the rear of the company on Egerton Lane.

The episode 2 scenes, within the cinema, were filmed at Penistone Paramount Cinema. The Berni Inn scenes were shot at nearby Cubley Hall in Cubley.

The production team was based at the old Finnegan builders yard on Ecclesall Road and the interior of the main character's house was a set built in the former joiners shop.

== Reception ==
- The New Statesman said: 'Brief Encounters is warm and joyful – but no-one in Sheffield calls [the evening meal] "dinner": I can pinpoint the exact moment when I fell, somewhat embarrassingly, for Brief Encounters (Mondays, 9pm), ITV’s new comedy drama about naughty knicker parties in the early Eighties. An Aldi version of The Full Monty, it arrives on our screens with every cliché of character and plot intact. But my heart is simply not up to the job of resisting it.'
- The Daily Telegraph July 2016 gave it 4 out 5 stars: 'these desperate housewives were funny and full of heart: Brief Encounters (ITV) is a sparky new six-part drama about Ann Summers reps in Eighties Yorkshire, set against a backdrop of unemployment. An unpromising pitch on paper, perhaps, but this first episode was a revelation: frank, funny, and full of heart. Going against her family’s wishes, married mother Steph (Sophie Rundle) made a life-changing decision to run parties selling “exotic lingerie and marital aids”. She roped in two working-class pals and Pauline (Penelope Wilton), the well-to-do lady for whom she cleaned. This motley quartet soon declared: “It’s our duty to sexually awaken the women of Sheffield." It was as if Victoria Wood had rewritten The Full Monty. Brief Encounters was drama by women, about women – but not just for women.'

== Awards and nominations ==
Year	Association	Category	Nominee(s)	Result
2017	Diversity in Media Awards	Programme of the Year	Brief Encounters	Nominated

== Remake ==
On July 22, 2024, it was announced that a South Korean remake of the series titled A Virtuous Business, starring Kim So-yeon, Yeon Woo-jin, Kim Sung-ryung, Kim Sun-young, and Lee Se-hee, was in the works; it was broadcast on JTBC in 2024.
