= Jan and Vlasta Dalibor =

Jan Dalibor (5 May 1921 – 23 July 2013) and his wife Vlasta Dalibor (born Vlasta Cely, 22 May 1921 – 21 February 2016) were Czech-born British puppeteers, responsible for devising and developing the characters Pinky and Perky on children's television in the 1950s and 1960s.

== Biography ==
Vlasta Cely was born in Brno, and became friends with Jan Dalibor as a child. She attended a language school and the Janáček Academy of performing arts while Jan taught an art class, but after the Nazi annexation of Czechoslovakia he was made to work in a factory and she became secretary to a businessman. They married after the end of World War II, and in 1948 escaped from the new Communist regime by making their way to Austria. Arriving as refugees in Britain, they settled in Yorkshire. Jan worked in a stone quarry at Tadcaster as a miner, and Vlasta worked as a housemaid in Houndhill.

In his spare time Jan Dalibor began making wooden marionettes, and Vlasta suggested that he make some in the shape of pigs, a symbol of good luck in Czechoslovakia. They began performing with their puppets in 1951, and made their first appearance in a summer season show at Heysham in 1956. The puppets "Pinky" and "Perky" (originally "Porky") were initially minor uncredited characters in the show. They were seen there by Trevor Hill, producer of The Sooty Show, and the Dalibors made their first television appearance later that year on a BBC talent show, It's Up to You, which featured the two puppet piglets.

In 1958, Pinky and Perky began nine years of regular series on BBC television, their show often appearing immediately before the regular early evening news bulletin, where their comments on current affairs occasionally attracted controversy. One of these, “You, too, can be a Prime Minister”, was initially postponed; when it was eventually shown, it attracted more viewers than Harold Wilson’s party political broadcast on ITV.

The shows also included many other marionettes constructed by Jan Dalibor, and his work was noted for its fine craftsmanship which enabled the puppets to be shown in close-up. Over 200 episodes of the show were broadcast. At the peak of their popularity in the early and mid-1960s, the shows attracted audiences of 15 million, and the characters, with high-pitched speeded-up voices, appeared on records as well as a wide range of merchandise. They appeared at the 1963 Royal Variety Performance alongside the Beatles and Marlene Dietrich, and the characters also became popular in the US, appearing on The Ed Sullivan Show and in Las Vegas.

In 1968, the Pinky and Perky television series was dropped by the BBC but moved to Thames Television for a further four years. The Dalibors retired in 1973, and sold the rights to their characters for £500,000. The characters were revived on BBC television in 2008.

The couple retired to Newport, Pembrokeshire. Jan Dalibor died in 2013, and Vlasta in 2016.
