= Kkondae =

South Korean word for condescending people

- Hangul: 꼰대
- RR: kkondae
- MR: kkondae
- IPA: [k͈ondɛ]

Kkondae (Korean: 꼰대) is an expression used in South Korea to describe a condescending person. The slang noun kkondae was originally used by students and teenagers to refer to older people such as fathers and teachers. Recently, however, the word has been used to refer to a boss or an older person who does so-called kkondae-jil (acting like a kkondae, in the Korean language), that forces the former's outdated way of thinking onto another person.

== Etymology ==
There are two competing arguments on the origin of kkondae. The first theory claims that the word kondaegi, which means a pupa in the South Gyeongsang Province dialect, is the origin: The folded skin of a pupa reminds the wrinkles of an old man, so the word might have become a representation of an old man. The other theory suggests the French nobility title comte (count) is the basis of the word kkondae (although a modern French person would probably hear the old slang for police, condé). During the Japanese occupation of Korea, pro-Japanese politicians such as Lee Wan-yong received nobility titles from the Japanese government. They proudly called themselves kkondae, hence it might have been developed into a slang term later.

=== Late 20th century ===
Originally, the word kkondae meant simply an old man in a profane way. During the late 1960s when industrialization and westernization were in full swing in South Korea, the word also began to refer to (classroom) teachers. Students, dissatisfied with the outdated school environment, would dismiss teachers from the older generation as old-fashioned beings. Hence, the word kkondae became a slang term used by students.

== Cause ==
The society of Korea is changing rapidly through innovation, increasingly widening the gap between the generations. This is not simply a matter of generation gap. This issue is associated with media, technological advances, and globalization. In addition, there are emerging generations in which growth is delayed. This is one of the backgrounds of discourse. It means that there are a lot of people who are not satisfied with the social norm of being grown up. This is also a structural problem. When the average life span was short, people accept and adapt quickly went to the social demands. But while human life began to increase gradually, people began to slow in marriage, career, academic and form part of this interaction paradigm and the kkondae.

== Social phenomenon ==
The word 'kkondae' is becoming increasingly problematic in society. If people who know something more try to tell people they do not know, the people who receive the information sometimes think of such behavior as robust. So now people try to notice or refrain from behaving to tell others about what they experience and know first. When the image of human being is formed, people around them tend to look at the person with a negative gaze and think of it as a person who thinks behind the times.

These problems are not only seen by people who are older and have experienced much. Now, as people look at people who are different from themselves with negative perceptions, the meaning of kkondae is getting wider and the people living in Korean society tend not to push or persuade their opinions and thoughts compared to the past.

== Influence ==
As the word 'kkondae' came along, people began to refrain from acting on themselves and their thoughts to force others to agree. Also, people with older or more life experiences tend to try to understand young cultures, and a combination of older generations and current generations of cultures is emerging. This phenomenon appears in various areas, such as music, TV programs, and fashion.

=== Music ===
The combination of the atmosphere of old songs and the current trendy songs is producing the area of new music. In addition, the old singer and the current singer work together to work on harmonious songs. This phenomenon is a combination of the old generation and the young generation at the same time, and it can embrace various groups and people.

=== TV programs ===
TV programs are also being affected a lot. Regulations on broadcasting have been relaxed much, and positive suggestions have begun to be made, not to interpret negative trends in the current phenomenon. When the performers come out of the TV program and play a game, try Dutch pie, or try new things, they used to make such a negative TV program, but now it is a very natural phenomenon.

=== Fashion ===
The old generation tended to look strange about the fashionable clothes and accessories. Recently, however, the old generation have been looking at trendy clothes, hair styles, and accessories positively and looking at them. In addition, old fashion trends are forming new trends in combination with popular fashion trends, which is evidence that fashion is developing over time.

== Current situation ==
Younger people may often criticize older people while older people may represent younger generations. Recently They are often asked to ask questions or to ask questions about their loyalty. It has been used as a profanity for a long time. But at some point it will be an important social keyword. The word 'kkondae' refers to the teacher as a whole. There has been a remarkable change between expanding to general. The discourse of the younger generations is not only a problem for adults but also for seniors and even friends of department and club.
