= Oriane Messina =

British comedy writer and performer

Oriane Messina (born 20 January 1971) is a British comedy writer and performer.

== Career ==
Messina best known for her work in the sketch show Smack the Pony and the sitcom Green Wing. She has had a working partnership with fellow writer Fay Rusling since 1999. In 2007, she appeared briefly as a nurse in sitcom Not Going Out, and again briefly in 2008 as a driving tester in The Inbetweeners.

== Performer ==
Green Wing (2004–2007), playing several roles
Speeding in Channel 4's Comedy Lab (2005), playing Louise
The Inbetweeners (2008), playing the driving tester.
Miranda (2009), playing "Teacher" in the episode "Job"

== Writer ==
Smack the Pony (1999–2003)
2DTV – (2001–2004) (as Orianne Messina)
Green Wing (2004–2007)
Speeding in Channel 4's Comedy Lab (2005)
Campus (2009–2011)
Me and Mrs Jones (TV series) (2012) (also creator)
Brief Encounters (TV series) (2016) (also creator)
Breeders (2020–2021)
Piglets (2024)

== Radio ==
Bearded Ladies – (2005) (presenter, writer and performer)
