= Fay Rusling =

British comedy writer and performer

Fay Rusling is a British comedy writer and performer.

== Career ==
Rusling is most known for her work in the sketch show Smack the Pony and the sitcom Green Wing. She has had a working partnership with fellow writer Oriane Messina since 1999.

== Performer ==
Green Wing (2004-2007) Playing Nurse.
Speeding in Channel 4's Comedy Lab (2005) Playing Abigail.

== Writer ==
Smack the Pony (1999-2003)
2DTV (2001-2004)
Green Wing (2004-2007)
Speeding in Channel 4's Comedy Lab (2005)
Campus (2009-2011)
Me and Mrs Jones (2012) (also creator)
Brief Encounters (TV series) (2016) (also creator)
Breeders (2020-2021)
Piglets (2024)

== Radio ==
Bearded Ladies - (2005-Present, Writer and Performer)
