= Alan Partridge: Alpha Papa =

2013 British comedy film

- UK theatrical release poster
- Directed by: Declan Lowney
- Screenplay by: Neil Gibbons; Rob Gibbons; Steve Coogan; Armando Iannucci; Peter Baynham
- Based on: Characters by Steve Coogan; Armando Iannucci; Patrick Marber; Peter Baynham
- Produced by: Kevin Loader; Henry Normal
- Starring: Steve Coogan; Colm Meaney
- Cinematography: Ben Smithard
- Edited by: Mark Everson
- Music by: Ilan Eshkeri
- Production companies: StudioCanal; BBC Films; BFI; Baby Cow Films
- Distributed by: StudioCanal
- Release date: 7 August 2013
- Running time: 90 minutes
- Country: United Kingdom
- Language: English
- Budget: £4 million
- Box office: $9.8 million

Alan Partridge: Alpha Papa (released as simply Alan Partridge in the United States) is a 2013 British comedy film starring Steve Coogan as Alan Partridge, a fictional presenter he has played on various BBC radio and television shows since 1991. It was directed by Declan Lowney and written by Coogan, Armando Iannucci, Peter Baynham and Neil and Rob Gibbons. Colm Meaney co-starred as Pat Farrell, a DJ who takes hostages after he is fired from Partridge's radio station; Partridge is enlisted as a negotiator.

Principal photography beginning on 7 January 2013 in Norwich and Mitcham, Alpha Papa premiered on 24 July 2013, at the Hollywood Cinema in Anglia Square, Norwich. It was released in the United Kingdom and Ireland on 7 August 2013 by StudioCanal UK, where it opened at number one in the box office. Magnolia Pictures distributed the film in the United States. The film received a positive reception and grossed $9.8 million on a £4 million budget. It also received a Grand Marnier Fellowship Award nomination for Best Film.

== Plot ==
Norwich radio station North Norfolk Digital is bought out by a multinational corporation, with staff facing redundancies. DJ Alan Partridge is unconcerned, but DJ Pat Farrell pleads with him to hijack a board meeting to urge the new owners against layoffs. When Alan discovers that either he or Pat will be laid off, he urges them to fire Pat, and writes "JUST SACK PAT" on the room's flipchart.

During a company party, Pat enters the station with a shotgun and holds the staff hostage, demanding his job back. The police enlist Alan as a negotiator, and he gains Pat's trust. With Alan's co-presenter Sidekick Simon, the three host a radio show commenting on the siege. Alan daydreams of ending the siege heroically, but cannot bring himself to wrestle Pat's gun from him. As the siege becomes national news, Alan's arrogance resurfaces and he shares a kiss with his colleague Angela.

Alan accidentally locks himself out of the building and loses his trousers trying to re-enter through a window. The police realise he is useless and send in an undercover officer disguised as a pizza delivery man; Alan intercepts and takes the pizzas in himself. When Pat discovers a taser in one of the boxes, an altercation erupts between the hostages and the police burst in. Pat escapes in the station's tour bus, taking Alan and the security guard, Michael, hostage.

Alan and Pat continue to host the radio show from the bus. However, Pat sees Alan's "JUST SACK PAT" message in a photo and realises that Alan was behind his redundancy. Alan hides in the bus toilet and escapes in the septic tank. On Cromer Pier, Pat battles Alan and the police. Michael tries to distract Pat by throwing himself off the pier. Pat tells Alan that he is suicidal due to the death of his wife and prepares to shoot himself. Unable to pull the trigger, he gives his shotgun to Alan, who throws it aside. The gun goes off, shooting Alan in the leg; a police sniper, reacting to gunfire, shoots him again. Alan assumes he is dying, but a paramedic assures him he will be fine.

Alan returns to North Norfolk Digital with Sidekick Simon, and Pat calls in to the show from prison for the next month. Alan goes on holiday with Angela and her sons.

== Cast ==
Several characters from I'm Alan Partridge make appearances in the film. Alongside Steve Coogan as Partridge are his personal assistant Lynn Benfield (Felicity Montagu), Phil Cornwell's rival DJ Dave Clifton, and Simon Greenall as Alan's eccentric Geordie friend Michael. Comedian and poet Tim Key reprises his role as Sidekick Simon from the Mid Morning Matters series, while Colm Meaney, who shares billing alongside Coogan in publicity for the film, stars as Pat Farrell, the sympathetic villain.

- Steve Coogan as Alan Partridge
- Colm Meaney as Pat Farrell
- Felicity Montagu as Lynn Benfield
- Simon Greenall as Michael
- Phil Cornwell as DJ Dave Clifton
- Sean Pertwee as Steve Stubbs, a specialist firearms officer
- Anna Maxwell Martin as Acting Chief Constable Janet Whitehead
- Darren Boyd as Detective Sergeant Martin Fitch, a hostage negotiator from Scotland Yard
- Nigel Lindsay as Jason Cresswell
- Karl Theobald as Greg Frampton
- Simon Delaney as Don
- Monica Dolan as Angela Ashbourne
- Tim Key as "Sidekick" Simon Denton
- Paul Blackwell as Police Officer
- Dustin Demri-Burns as Danny Sinclair
- Simon Kunz as Conner Scott
- Jessica Knappett as police officer
- Darren Deans as Radio Station Voiceover

== Production ==
Alan Partridge, played by Steve Coogan, was created for the 1991 BBC Radio 4 comedy programme On The Hour, a spoof of British current affairs broadcasting. The character went on to appear in a series of radio and television productions, including Knowing Me, Knowing You and I'm Alan Partridge.

Rumours of an Alan Partridge film began in August 2004, when a small piece appeared in The Metro newspaper which claimed Coogan had been given the green light from a US studio for a Partridge film. Coogan reportedly said: "It's always been my plan to make Alan go global. It's what he lives for really, not just doing the show on Radio Norwich." In April 2005, Coogan's production firm Baby Cow announced that an Alan Partridge film was planned. It was later revealed the film would involve an al-Qaeda siege, but due to the sensitivities of such a storyline after the July 2005 London bombings, the project was put on hold. Playwright Patrick Marber, whose early collaborations with Coogan included The Day Today and Knowing Me, Knowing You... with Alan Partridge, had also been working on the script, while actress Felicity Montagu, who plays Partridge's personal assistant Lynn, also confirmed that there had been discussions about the film.

Further details of the film were released in November 2007. The plot of the film involved Alan Partridge attempting another comeback from local radio, only to have his ambitions thwarted when Middle Eastern terrorists hijack the BBC offices. Coogan had written some dialogue, but at the time he was uncertain of whether he wanted to revisit Partridge. In 2010, Partridge co-creator Armando Iannucci confirmed that the story had been agreed and would not be based on Partridge travelling to the United States. Meanwhile, the character was revived for a web series, Mid Morning Matters with Alan Partridge, as well as two one-off specials produced for Sky Atlantic.

In 2012, Iannucci stated that the as-yet-untitled film was in pre-production and would be shooting later in the year for a 2013 UK release, and would be directed by Declan Lowney of Father Ted fame. The film is a co-production between Baby Cow Productions, BBC Films, the BFI Film Fund, and StudioCanal. The film had a budget of £4 million. It was released in the UK by StudioCanal. In March 2013, a teaser trailer for the film revealed the title to be Alan Partridge: Alpha Papa.

== Soundtrack ==
- "Koyaanisqatsi" – performed by Philip Glass Ensemble
- "Roxanne" – performed by the Police
- "Škoda lásky" aka "Beer Barrel Polka" – written by Jaromir Vejvoda and Vasek Zeman
- "Cuddly Toy" – performed by Roachford
- "Couldn't Get It Right" – performed by Climax Blues Band
- "Hard to Say I'm Sorry" – performed by Chicago
- "Bounce" – written and performed by Calvin Harris
- "Swede Love" – performed by Jakob Liedholm
- "I Want You to Know" – performed by jACQ and Passion Victim
- "Wide Eyed and Legless" – performed by Andy Fairweather Low
- "Pop goes bach" – performed by Sam Fonteyn
- "Wichita Lineman" – performed by Glen Campbell
- "Swinging Low" – performed by the Outlaws
- "Sky News Toth" – performed by Adelphoi Music
- "Always on My Mind" – performed by Willie Nelson
- "BBC News Theme" – by David Lowe
- "Enola Gay" – performed by Orchestral Manoeuvres in the Dark
- "Let's Stick Together" – performed by Bryan Ferry
- "The Number One Song in Heaven" – performed by Sparks
- "All The Wrong Places" – performed by Example
- "You're the Voice" – performed by John Farnham

== Release ==
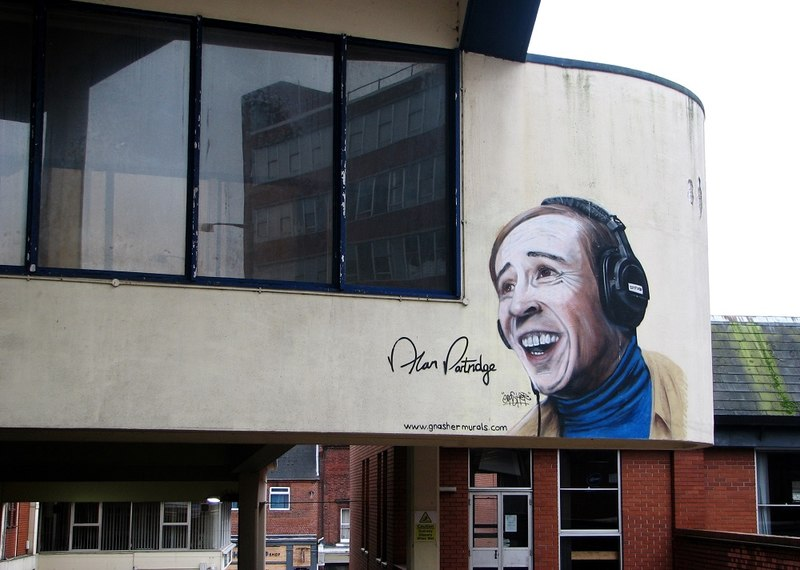
A mural of Alan Partridge on the Hollywood Cinema in Norwich, where Alpha Papa had its world premiere

After a campaign named "Anglia Square not Leicester Square" the world premiere was held in Anglia Square, Norwich, on 24 July 2013 with Coogan appearing in character. Steve Coogan greeted fans at Anglia Square before being taken by helicopter to London to attend a full premiere in Leicester Square.

In its opening weekend, the film grossed £2.18 million at the UK box office, beating Percy Jackson: Sea of Monsters and Grown Ups 2 for the number one spot. As of 22 September 2013, Alpha Papa had grossed a total of £6.12 million at the UK Box Office. It was released in the UK on DVD and Blu-ray on 2 December 2013. On 4 April 2014, Coogan's production company, Baby Cow, said they were planning a sequel.

== Reception ==
On Rotten Tomatoes, Alpha Papa has an approval rating of 87%, based on reviews from 109 critics, with an average score of 7/10. The website's critical consensus reads: "The Alan Partridge movie ditches the TV series' nuanced humor for something broader, and succeeds in presenting the character on a global scale." On Metacritic it has a weighted average score of 66 out of 100, based on 27 critics, indicating "generally favourable reviews". James Mottram, who reviewed the film for Total Film, gave the film four stars out of five, saying "Smartly executed, endlessly quotable and machine-gun quick, this is one of the funniest films of 2013."

Empire's Dan Jolin awarded the film an "excellent" four stars out of five, stating "it provides a masterclass in physical character comedy courtesy of the Alan himself... Ruddy hilarious. Just what big-screen comedy needed." Chris Tilly, who reviewed the film for IGN, gave the film 8.5 out of 10, saying "It's not easy to take a beloved TV character and replicate their success on film...But Steve Coogan and co have nailed it with the first Alan Partridge movie, a gloriously entertaining comedy that resembles a Hollywood blockbuster...while at the same time staying true to the roots of the character." Robbie Collin of The Daily Telegraph gave the film a mixed review. He said, in a three out of five star review, that "Alpha Papa allows Alan Partridge to dream big – or biggish, anyway – for the first time in the character’s 21-year history. But since when was he the man of our dreams?"

== Accolades ==
Chicago International Film Festival 2013

Award	Nominee	Result
Audience Choice Award	Declan Lowney	Nominated

Empire Awards, UK 2014

Award	Nominee	Result
Empire Award	Best Comedy	Won
Empire Award	Best British Film	Nominated

Golden Trailer Awards 2014

Award	Category	Nominee	Result
Golden Trailer	Best Foreign Comedy Trailer	Magnolia and Zealot Productions	Nominated

Guardian Film Awards, UK 2014

Award	Category	Result
Guardian Film Award	Best Marketing Campaign	Nominated
Guardian Film Award	Best Scene (Alan Partridge lip-synching to Roachford)	Nominated

London Critics Circle Film Awards 2014

Award	Category	Nominee	Result
ALFS Award	British Actor of the Year	Steve Coogan For The Look of Love, Philomena and What Maisie Knew	Nominated

New York Film Festival 2013

Award	Category	Nominee	Result
Grand Marnier Fellowship Award	Best Film	Declan Lowney	Nominated
