= On the Hour =

British current affairs radio parody

- Double cassette cover featuring Chris Morris, 1992
- Running time: 30 minutes
- Home station: BBC Radio 4
- Hosted by: Christopher Morris
- Original release: 1991 – 1992
- No. of series: 2
- No. of episodes: 12

On the Hour is a British radio programme that parodied current affairs broadcasting, broadcast on BBC Radio 4 between 1991 and 1992. Written by Chris Morris, Armando Iannucci, Steven Wells, Andrew Glover, Stewart Lee, Richard Herring and David Quantick, On the Hour starred Morris as the overzealous and self-important principal anchorman (for which he used his own full name). He was accompanied by a regular cast assembled by Iannucci, comprising Steve Coogan, Rebecca Front, Doon Mackichan, Patrick Marber and David Schneider, who portrayed assorted news reporters, presenters and interviewees. On the Hour featured the first appearance of Coogan's character Alan Partridge as the "Sports Desk" reporter.

== Overview ==
As in much of Morris's work, surrealism was an important part of the programme, the nonsense in the content ("De-frocked cleric eats car park", "Borrowed dog finds Scotland", etc.) delivered in the same straight-faced manner with which contemporary news stories are dealt, and it has often been quoted that Morris's initial intention was indeed to show how the public would believe anything if it were delivered with a straight face. It did fool many people, with some listeners ringing in to complain about how the anchor treated his guests. The programme also utilised editing of out-of-context sound-clips and prank phone calls, heightening its surreal quality.

The programme satirised broadcasting within news programmes by emphasising that it was reporting the news, repeating the show's title, and using such aspects as news speak, media manipulation, exploitation of tragedies, patronising mistreatment of the general public, a lack of fact checking (personified by Marber's Peter O'Hanraha-hanrahan), and the general assumption that the programme itself is infallible ("On the Hour – Towards a New Eden"). Also satirised were party political broadcasts, chummy yet vacuous radio DJs (in the form of Morris's Wayne Carr), religious broadcasting, glossy magazines, 'fun' local events, local radio, youth information shows, Radio 4 plays, royal ceremonies, and even satirical comedies that do not hit the mark. Episodes often featured a main storyline (the World "Summit on the Future", coverage of the public execution of Prince Edward, etc.) interspersed between the news items.

Twelve episodes were made (including a Christmas special, of which two versions exist) and broadcast in 1991 and 1992. A regular feature in Series One (episodes 1-6) was the On the Hour "Audio Pullout", a mid-episode "colour supplement" that would usually parody human interest stories and local events (and, in one episode, was sponsored by a [fictional] American Christian Fundamentalist sect).

The final episode of On the Hour closed with Morris introducing a set of headlines with the line "And there is still just time to part the belief curtains on tomorrow's news." Running throughout the final episode was the announcement that On the Hour would be taking over all of Radio 4 to transmit 24-hour "Perma-News".

On the Hour was named "Best Radio Comedy" at the 1992 British Comedy Awards, and it also won the 1992 Writers' Guild of Great Britain Award for Comedy/Light Entertainment. The On the Hour team (minus Lee and Herring due to creative/legal disputes, who were replaced by Peter Baynham and writers Graham Linehan and Arthur Mathews) subsequently made a television series called The Day Today, which retained the same regular cast and several characters from On the Hour.

== Recurring characters ==
Christopher Morris (Chris Morris): The anchor. Combative and over-zealous, he believes in the infallibility of the news, bombastically delivering slogans like "Man is only 90% water, but On the Hour is 100% news!", "Arise, Sir News!" and "These facts are ear-shaped, let's ram them home!" Morris frequently talks over his guests and does not realise or will not admit when he has the wrong person on the other end of the phone. He "interviews" real-life politicians, whose responses are edited from pre-recorded material to render them nonsensical, as well as the public, who give baffled or earnest responses to absurd questions such as, "Which is worse, a horizontal disease or a vertical disease?" Morris reprised his newsman persona for The Day Today and Brass Eye, retaining the character's self-importance while further emphasising his bullying demeanour.

Roger Blatt/Michael Blatt (Chris Morris): Roger Blatt is the "Disaster correspondent" for a train crash report; the identically voiced Michael Blatt is the "Strategy correspondent" for the On the Hour "War Special".

Wayne Carr (Chris Morris): An upbeat and smug DJ with a penchant for contracting words. Wayne's reports include inappropriately upbeat coverage of a train crash disaster, an exposé on hidden messages in pop records, and a "chinnywag" about endangered animals. The character of Wayne Carr was retained from Morris's previous radio projects. His name is a reference to the abusive term "wanker". While the personality of Carr is an amalgam of various BBC Radio 1 DJs throughout the 1980s and early 1990s, the principal inspiration is based on Steve Wright (DJ) and his show Steve Wright in the Afternoon.

Continuity Announcer (Chris Morris): Often called upon to present news or announce the station's scheduling, the Continuity Announcer speaks with a deep, nasal voice, and can be heard shuffling paperwork before he speaks. Morris later used the Continuity Announcer's voice for the national emergencies propaganda reel in the second episode of The Day Today.

Lionel Cosgrave (David Schneider): An Everyman who appears in several news reports; his surname is referred to interchangeably as "Cosgrave" and "Cosgrove". Lionel's age varies according to each report – sometimes he is a youngster, at other times middle-aged. Lionel is usually presented as a victim (of police corruption and brutality; physical abuse in public schools, etc.).

Rosy May (Rebecca Front): Environmental correspondent. Rosy presents absurd environmentally themed news in the segment "Green Desk". This segment is accompanied by new-age music, including synthesised whale song. Rosy later appeared in The Day Today, although her segment was re-titled "Enviromation".

Jacques Œuf (Chris Morris): Appears in two episodes as a French counterpart to Wayne Carr, primarily reporting on celebrity incidents, including a series of photos featuring celebrities vomiting in public and a fight between Brigitte Bardot and Jean-Michel Jarre at Cannes. A broadcaster from "Euronews", Œuf speaks in improper and mispronounced French. Like Carr, his name is a homophonic slang term for masturbation ("jack off").

Peter O'Hanraha-hanrahan (Patrick Marber): A grossly incompetent Economics correspondent who reports dubious facts and figures before being forced by Morris to admit that he has not read the reports he is presenting. He later appeared in The Day Today.

Alan Partridge (Steve Coogan): Sports correspondent. Alan presents "Sports Desk" reports for On the Hour, but he frequently displays little to no knowledge of the sports he is covering, getting the terminology and basic rules of the sports wrong. Interviewing real-life sporting figures impersonated by the cast such as Nigel Mansell, Graham Gooch, Seve Ballesteros, Gabriela Sabatini and Linford Christie, as well as fictional athletes, Alan frequently goes into tangents relating to groin injuries and the interviewees' physical attractiveness. His interviews usually end in awkwardness for himself, his subject(s), or both. He also makes condescending remarks towards women and Moroccans during his coverage of the 1992 Olympic Games. He is absent from the original untransmitted pilot episode of On the Hour, which features a sports correspondent named "Bill", played by Armando Iannucci. Now one of Britain's most enduring and beloved comic characters, after On the Hour, Alan would appear in the Radio 4 series Knowing Me Knowing You with Alan Partridge; the TV series The Day Today, Knowing Me Knowing You with Alan Partridge and I'm Alan Partridge; the web series Mid Morning Matters with Alan Partridge; two 'specials', the film Alan Partridge: Alpha Papa and most recently, the spoof magazine show This Time With Alan Partridge; as well as several appearances for the UK charity Comic Relief.

Kevin Smear (Patrick Marber): Correspondent who appears in several episodes and is later referred to as the winner of the "Golden Fist Award" for his reporting.

Monsignor Treeb-Lopez (Patrick Marber): Contributes trite, religious bons mot all somehow referencing Jesus in the segment "Thought for the Day". A creation of Lee and Herring, Treeb-Lopez was not retained for The Day Today; his character was replaced by Marber's French postmodernist philosopher, Jaques-'Jaques' Liverot.

Barbara Wintergreen (Rebecca Front): Correspondent on the American channel CBN. Speaking with an exaggerated American accent and making use of convoluted puns, her reports include a Christmas-themed prison execution, prenatal makeovers, a re-enactment of the JFK assassination, and women being banned from the state of Nebraska. Barbara's reports include recurring characters such as Death row inmate Daimler Jeffries (Patrick Marber) and feminist Donna Doubtfire (Doon Mackichan), as well as various characters played by Steve Coogan. Barbara Wintergreen later appeared in The Day Today, in which Marber's Daimler Jeffries character was renamed "Chapman Baxter" and Mackichan's Donna Doubtfire character was renamed "Thea Peachman".

== Reception ==
In a 2008 article for Uncut, David Quantick described On the Hour as "the show that changed everything" and wrote "only a complete arse would call On The Hour the Monty Python of the modern era, but I am a complete arse, so here goes: On The Hour is the Monty Python of the modern era. Which makes me at best a lumberjack, but there you go." In 2009, The Quietus wrote that On the Hour "remains one of British broadcast comedy's most dizzying accomplishments."

== Episodes ==
Series One

- Episode One (first broadcast: 9 August 1991)
- Episode Two (first broadcast: 16 August 1991)
- Episode Three (first broadcast: 23 August 1991)
- Episode Four (first broadcast: 30 August 1991)
- Episode Five (first broadcast: 6 September 1991)
- Episode Six [Christmas Special] (first broadcast: 24 December 1991)

Series Two

- Episode One (first broadcast: 23 April 1992)
- Episode Two (first broadcast: 30 April 1992)
- Episode Three (first broadcast: 7 May 1992)
- Episode Four (first broadcast: 14 May 1992)
- Episode Five (first broadcast: 21 May 1992)
- Episode Six (first broadcast: 28 May 1992)

== Commercial availability ==
Owing to a dispute with Lee and Herring, the show was initially only commercially available as a two-hour audio compilation on audio cassette. The compilation was edited down from the six hours of both series and specials, which removed all traces of Lee and Herring's writing. This was widely available for many years, and a CD re-release was announced in the early 2000s in the inlays of other Radio Collection titles but failed to materialise.

Like many BBC Radio comedies, On the Hour has been repeated on the digital station BBC Radio 4 Extra since its inception in 2002 as BBC7 (later BBC Radio 7), although most of these differ from the original broadcast versions. The final two episodes from series 1 are aired in their 30-minute form, taken from extended repeats broadcast in 1991, whilst series 2 transmissions are based on the edited repeats for BBC Radio 4. The penultimate episode of series 2 was missing from all millennial repeats, as the master tape was apparently lost, but after a twelve-year search the tape was finally located and the episode repeated several times in 2015 (from the master copy of the edited repeat like the rest of series 2).

Both series of On the Hour were released as limited-edition audio CD boxed sets by Warp Records in November 2008, in their original episodic form. Series 1 was uncut, although five out of six episodes of series 2 were presented in their significantly edited repeat versions. The only uncut series 2 episode — the then-still-missing episode 5 - was included from an off-air cassette. The Christmas episode included on the series 1 set is the 1992 version. The original version, first broadcast on 24 December 1991, featured a satirical overview of the year 1991; this overview was replaced by material parodying the events of 1992 for the episode's repeat on 31 December 1992.

Extra tracks include the untransmitted pilot episode; a remastered needledrop of the flexidisc originally released by Select magazine in May 1992; the "Resurrection Cattle" sketch (intended to be slipped into the Radio 4 series Today); and over 20 minutes of unedited improvisations from some of the Alan Partridge sessions.

Both series can also be purchased on iTunes and have been uploaded to streaming sites such as YouTube.
