= I, Partridge: We Need to Talk About Alan =

2011 book

- Author: Steve Coogan, Armando Iannucci, Rob and Neil Gibbons
- Language: English
- Genre: Humour
- Published: 2011 (HarperCollins)
- Publication place: United Kingdom
- Media type: Print (hardback & paperback)
- Pages: 366 (first edition, hardback)
- ISBN: 9780007449170 (first edition, hardback)

I, Partridge: We Need to Talk About Alan is a 2011 mock autobiography as written by the British comedy character Alan Partridge. It was written by Steve Coogan, Armando Iannucci and Rob and Neil Gibbons. An audiobook version recorded by Coogan as Partridge was released on CD and downloadable audio formats.

Coogan said: "We just wanted to do what he would do in trying to write his autobiography. He wants to make his life more than unremarkable, so every single event in his life he tries to spin into something it's not. There was an argument between his parents about tax returns that he tries to turn into some kind of nightmare childhood - as if it was torturous for him and he was scarred by it."

The Independent described the book as "an acutely observed mock-memoir" and the Daily Telegraph said that "The index to I, Partridge is one of the top five indexes of all time." The book received positive reviews and became a bestseller. Coogan appeared as Partridge to promote the book on The Jonathan Ross Show on 1 October 2011.

A second autobiography, Alan Partridge: Nomad, was released in 2016, and a third, Big Beacon: A Lighthouse Rebuilt, a Broadcaster Reborn, followed in 2023.
