= This Time with Alan Partridge =

BBC comedy series

- Genre: Parody
- Developed by: Steve Coogan; Neil Gibbons; Rob Gibbons
- Written by: Steve Coogan; Neil Gibbons; Rob Gibbons
- Directed by: Neil Gibbons; Rob Gibbons
- Starring: Steve Coogan; Susannah Fielding; Felicity Montagu; Tim Key
- Country of origin: United Kingdom
- Original language: English
- No. of series: 2
- No. of episodes: 12

Production
- Producer: Ted Dowd
- Camera setup: Multi-camera
- Running time: 29 minutes
- Production company: Baby Cow Productions

Original release
- Network: BBC One
- Release: 25 February 2019 – 4 June 2021

This Time with Alan Partridge is a British sitcom first broadcast in 2019 on BBC One. It stars Steve Coogan as the inept broadcaster Alan Partridge in a spoof of day-time magazine programmes such as The One Show and Good Morning Britain.

After a series of productions with Sky, This Time was the first BBC Alan Partridge production since I'm Alan Partridge ended in 2002. Susannah Fielding plays Partridge's co-host Jennie, and Tim Key and Felicity Montagu reprise their roles as Simon Denton and Partridge's assistant Lynn Benfield. The series received generally favourable reviews. A second series was broadcast in 2021.

== Premise ==
Alan Partridge, an inept broadcaster played by Steve Coogan, becomes the stand-in presenter of This Time after the regular co-host falls ill. According to The Guardian, the show features "Partridgean tirades on everything from hand hygiene (leading him to lurk outside the BBC toilets doing spot-checks on colleagues) to hacking". It also plays on his past working relationships with colleagues, for example on-location reporter Ruth Duggan (Lolly Adefope) who has become his arch-nemesis.

== Production ==
Alan Partridge was created in 1991 by Coogan and Armando Iannucci. Following early Partridge shows such as Knowing Me, Knowing You and I'm Alan Partridge, produced by the BBC, This Time was the first BBC Partridge project following several Sky productions. It was produced by Coogan's production company Baby Cow Productions, written by Coogan and the Gibbons brothers, directed by the Gibbons brothers, and produced by Ted Dowd.

Coogan felt it was the right time for Partridge to return, and that he might represent the views of Brexit voters. Neil Gibbons said the world of live television presenting had changed since Partridge had been created: "If someone fluffed a line or got someone’s name wrong or said something stupid, it was mortifying. But nowadays, those are the sort of people who are given jobs on TV." He likened Partridge to presenters such as Piers Morgan, who he felt had been hired to present Good Morning Britain because he said offensive things. Coogan and the Gibbonses ignored this because "if you put Alan in a world where his crass buffoonery is part of the selling point, there's nowhere for him to fall".

A second series was produced in 2020, and was broadcast on BBC One from 30 April 2021.

== Reception ==
This Time with Alan Partridge has received mostly positive reviews. Lucy Mangan of The Guardian wrote that "the differentiation of This Time With Alan Partridge's layers and escalation of every exchange is precision-engineered: beautiful things and a joy forever." Tim Glanfield of Radio Times felt it was "some of the best Alan Partridge ever made". Sean O'Grady of The Independent gave it five stars, and found it "a consistently strong creative achievement". The segment with Coogan as Martin Brennan (the Irish Alan Partridge lookalike who closes the show with Irish Republican Army songs) was described by Raidió Teilifís Éireann as "TV moment of the year", which would be remembered "in the canon of truly great Partridge moments."

Hugo Rifkind of The Times was less positive, saying "Only very occasionally does it soar into unexpected places. Still, for a character that came along a quarter of a century ago and still isn't old, maybe fresh delights are a bit too much to ask." Writing for Prospect, Lucinda Smyth argued "This Time is... OK. But it is not the best of British television, it's not even the best of Coogan, and it undermines both to say so... I don't mean to say that there haven't been a few gems in This Time. But overall the timing is patchy, the belly-laughs are few, and the script is tiringly Alan-centric."

The television host Piers Morgan, who is spoofed by This Time, said that Coogan was "trying to exact revenge on me because he now hates everything to do with newspapers... I used to love Alan Partridge, he used to be hilarious, brilliant. It is now utterly unwatchable."

== Cast ==
- Steve Coogan as Alan Partridge
- Susannah Fielding as co-presenter Jennie Gresham
- Tim Key as Partridge's sidekick Simon Denton
- Lolly Adefope as on-location reporter Ruth Duggan
- Felicity Montagu as Partridge's assistant Lynn Benfield
- Natasia Demetriou as makeup artist Tiff (Series 2)
- Alex Dee as Floor Manager

== Guest appearances ==
=== Series 1 (2019) ===
Episode 1

- Emily Maitlis as herself
- Cariad Lloyd as Alice Fluck
- Priyanga Burford as Jean Chaudhary
- Liam Williams as hacktivist

Episode 2

- Peter Wight as John Baskell
- Angela Curran as Annie
- Simon Farnaby as Sam Chatwin

Episode 3

- Jonathan Watson as Dale Daniels

Episode 4

- Monty Don as himself

Episode 5

- Ellie White as Dee Gilhooly
- Jamie Demetriou as Ralphy Moore

Episode 6

- Katy Wix as Susan Lyle

=== Series 2 (2021) ===
Episode 1

- Leila Farzad as Clarissa Hoskin
- Simon Kunz as Father Paul
- Simon Farnaby as Sam Chatwin

Episode 2

- John Thomson as Joe Beasley
- Colin Hoult as Howard
- Clive Hayward as Maurice

Episode 3

- Matt Smith as Dan Milner
- Nigel Lindsay as Tommy
- Rosie Cavaliero as Rosie Whitter

Episode 5

- Nick Mohammed as Bhavit Sharma

Episode 6

- Alex Lowe as Hugh Bevell
- Eleanor Matsuura as Professor Rebecca Burns

== Episodes ==
=== Series 1 (2019) ===
No.	Title	Directed by	Written by	Original release date	UK viewers (millions) (Note: Total number of viewers who watched on any device within 28 days of original transmission date.)
1	"Episode 1"	Neil Gibbons and Rob Gibbons	Steve Coogan, Neil Gibbons and Rob Gibbons	25 February 2019	5.86
Alan Partridge is hired to present BBC One magazine programme This Time after one of the two regular hosts, John Baskell, falls ill. Alan and the co-host Jennie Gresham cover seal pups, hygiene, and cyberterrorism.
2	"Episode 2"	Neil Gibbons and Rob Gibbons	Steve Coogan, Neil Gibbons and Rob Gibbons	4 March 2019	Unknown (Note: Did not rate in top 15 programmes on BBC One for the week, and so viewing figures were not published by BARB. This generally means viewing figures were below 4.5m.)
This Time former co-host John Baskell has died aged 65. In a recorded segment, Alan takes part in a reenactment of the Peasants' Revolt. Later, in remembrance, Alan reads out tweets from viewers reflecting on their favourite memories of John. This quickly turns awkward after allegations of sexual misconduct by John begin to overtake the live feed.
3	"Episode 3"	Neil Gibbons and Rob Gibbons	Steve Coogan, Neil Gibbons and Rob Gibbons	11 March 2019	Unknown
Now the new permanent co-host of This Time, Alan presents pieces on vegetarianism and corporal punishment.
4	"Episode 4"	Neil Gibbons and Rob Gibbons	Steve Coogan, Neil Gibbons and Rob Gibbons	18 March 2019	Unknown
Alan talks about police dog bravery. He demonstrates CPR and mouth-to-mouth resuscitation using a mannequin. His piece on product placement involves filming Monty Don without his prior knowledge. Alan meets a Daniel Craig lookalike and his own lookalike, an Irish farmer who performs a medley of three songs. The first being When You Were Sweet Sixteen and the second two being Irish republican songs: Come Out, Ye Black and Tans and The Men Behind the Wire.
5	"Episode 5"	Neil Gibbons and Rob Gibbons	Steve Coogan, Neil Gibbons and Rob Gibbons	25 March 2019	Unknown
Alan talks about the Me Too movement with a feminist woman, then reviews tweets of mother-in-law jokes (all originally written by Les Dawson) with Simon. Alan suffers an allergic reaction to oysters which makes his lips swell severely, yet goes ahead with his performance with mixed vocal harmony group the Quavers.
6	"Episode 6"	Neil Gibbons and Rob Gibbons	Steve Coogan, Neil Gibbons and Rob Gibbons	1 April 2019	Unknown
Jennie confronts Alan about an insulting comment he made about her behind her back, leading her to walk off set and leave Alan to finish the show without her. Simon joins him as co-host: they discuss women's clothes, being arrested by the police, water supply in Africa and dreams. Alan is called in for a meeting with the executive producer, the Director-General of the BBC and Jennie immediately after the show.

=== Series 2 (2021) ===
No.	Title	Directed by	Written by	Original release date	UK viewers (millions)
7	"Episode 1"	Neil Gibbons and Rob Gibbons	Steve Coogan, Neil Gibbons and Rob Gibbons	30 April 2021	Unknown
Alan is relishing his revived television career. However, conscious of being left in the shadow of co-presenter Jennie and alert to potential changes behind the scenes, he grows increasingly anxious about his place in the big time. Jennie and Sam announce their engagement live on air.
8	"Episode 2"	Neil Gibbons and Rob Gibbons	Steve Coogan, Neil Gibbons and Rob Gibbons	7 May 2021	Unknown
A new make-up artist flirts with Alan, and a ventriloquist act returns from Knowing Me, Knowing You. The episode's main focus is the criminal justice system, during which Alan investigates by spending time in a young offenders' institute.
9	"Episode 3"	Neil Gibbons and Rob Gibbons	Steve Coogan, Neil Gibbons and Rob Gibbons	14 May 2021	N/A
Alan joins an SAS training mission and interviews a journalist who criticises the show. Drinks expert Rosie Whitter demonstrates cocktail recipes and Alan gets drunk on air.
10	"Episode 4"	Neil Gibbons and Rob Gibbons	Steve Coogan, Neil Gibbons and Rob Gibbons	21 May 2021	N/A
Alan investigates chemsex. He learns that Jennie and Sam have broken up. Izzy Barnes demonstrates drama therapy in the studio.
11	"Episode 5"	Neil Gibbons and Rob Gibbons	Steve Coogan, Neil Gibbons and Rob Gibbons	28 May 2021	N/A
Alan pays tribute to female World War 2 fighter pilots and deals with a studio invasion by a group of topless female anti-capitalist protesters. Alan invites the studio make-up artist Tiff to his house in Cornwall for the weekend.
12	"Episode 6"	Neil Gibbons and Rob Gibbons	Steve Coogan, Neil Gibbons and Rob Gibbons	4 June 2021	N/A
Alan loses an opportunity to interview Princess Anne, and falls for Simon's prank, causing him to broadcast embarrassing photos to the nation. He snaps on air, declaring his audience "idiots", and is emboldened by tweets calling for different TV coverage.
