= Felicity Montagu =

British actress (born 1960)

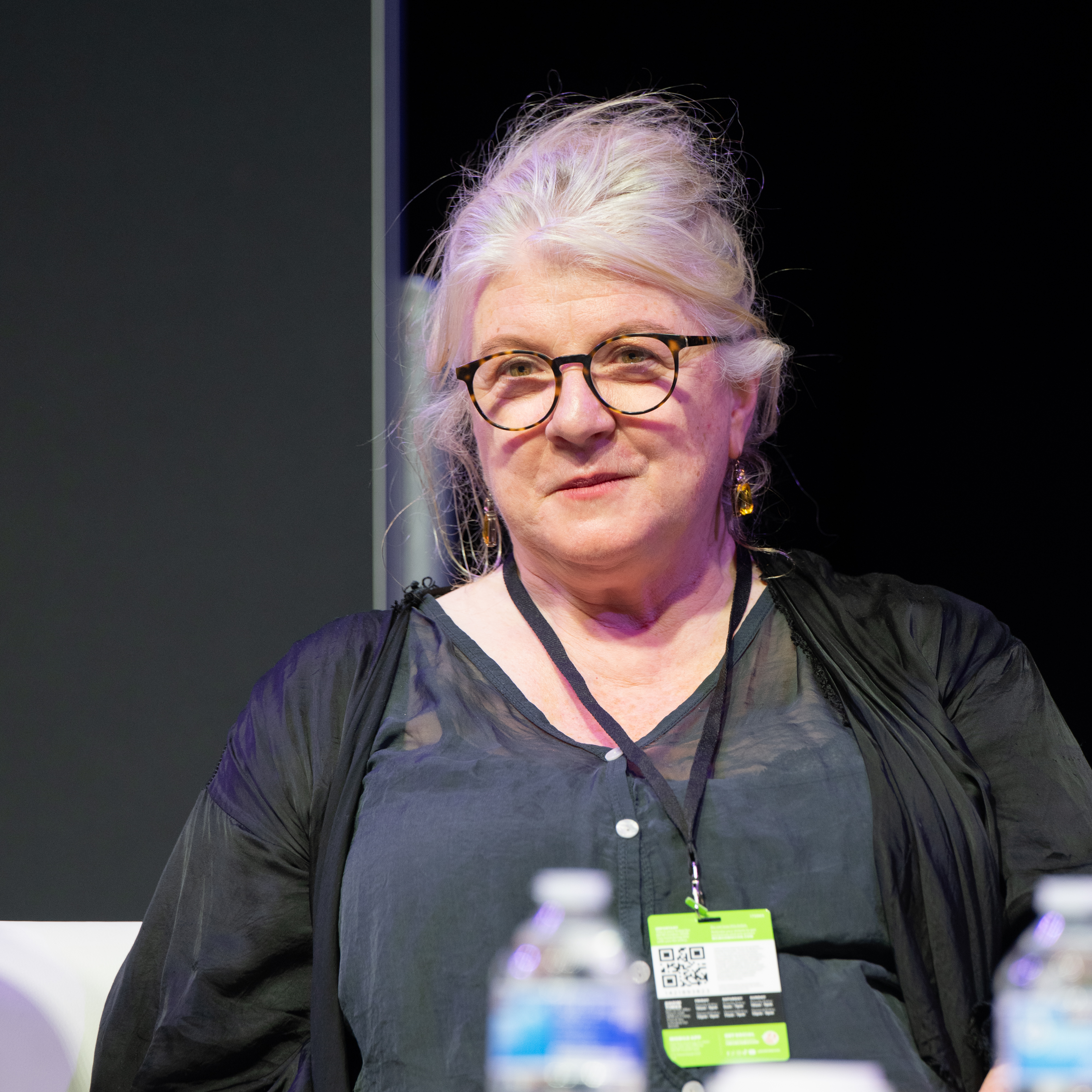
- At MCM London Comic Con, 23 May 2026
- Born: Felicity Jane Montagu; 12 September 1960 (age 66); Leeds, West Riding of Yorkshire, England
- Occupation: Actress
- Years active: 1985–present
- Spouse: Alan Nixon (m. 1984; div. 2006)
- Children: 2

Felicity Jane Montagu (born 12 September 1960) is an English actress. She is best known for playing Lynn Benfield, the long-suffering assistant of Alan Partridge, and Margo Martins in Beyond Paradise (2023–present).

== Early life ==
Montagu was born in Leeds, West Riding of Yorkshire in 1960. She is one of five children, and is a 6x great-granddaughter of Henry Montagu, 1st Earl of Manchester. She attended Loughborough University and the Webber Douglas Academy of Dramatic Art.

== Career ==
Felicity Montagu has appeared in films and in television programmes. She appears on stage and does voice acting on radio. Her career began on stage after she graduated from drama school.

=== Film ===
Montagu's reputation in comedy character parts was enhanced by her performance in Bridget Jones's Diary as Perpetua, Bridget's unpleasant colleague. She also appeared in the 2006 film Confetti as highly strung magazine editor Vivien Kay-Wylie. She appeared in the film I Want Candy in which she plays the mother of an ambitious teenager. She appeared in How to Lose Friends & Alienate People (2008).

In 2013, she reprised her role as Lynn Benfield for the Alan Partridge film Alan Partridge: Alpha Papa, and Mrs Mainwaring in the 2016 Dad's Army film. In 2016, Montagu reprised her role as Miss Adolf from the Hank Zipzer series in the TV movie Hank Zipzer's Christmas Catastrophe.

=== Television ===
In 2004 and 2005, Montagu starred in the ITV comedy drama Doc Martin as Caroline Bosman, the radio presenter of Radio Portwenn. She played Lynn, the faithful but put-upon personal assistant in I'm Alan Partridge, and the vicar's wife Sue in Nighty Night. In 2006, she took the leading role of housewife and gang queen Barbara Du Prez in the comedy series Suburban Shootout.

Her other television credits include Mapp & Lucia, The Bill, Lovejoy, Health and Efficiency, Wish Me Luck, Tumbledown, Harry Enfield's Television Programme, 2point4 Children, A Touch of Frost, My Life as a Popat, Johnny and the Bomb, Peak Practice, The Queen's Sister, Coogan's Run, Doc Martin, Lead Balloon, Alexei Sayle's Stuff, Skins, Hank Zipzer, M.I. High, The Durrells, The End of the F***ing World, Rab C. Nesbitt, and Sally4Ever.

In 2020, she appeared as a contestant on Celebrity Masterchef.

She has a role in the main cast in the series Beyond Paradise, a spin-off from the Death in Paradise series. Three series have aired, from 2023 to 2025. A fourth series is anticipated.

=== Theatre ===
After graduating from drama school, Montagu was cast in the Terry Johnson play Unsuitable for Adults at the Bush Theatre. She went on to work at the Royal Court Theatre and the Royal National Theatre.

After a long hiatus due to her screen work, Montagu returned to the stage when she starred as Melanie alongside Rowan Atkinson in the 2013 West End production of Quartermaine's Terms at Wyndham's Theatre. In 2017, she appeared at the Liverpool Playhouse in a stage adaptation of Jane Austen's Pride and Prejudice as Mrs Bennet, alongside Matthew Kelly as Mr Bennet.

=== Radio ===
Montagu has also been a regular voice on a range of comedy programmes on BBC Radio 4 since the mid-1980s. Her credits include Dirk Gently's Holistic Detective Agency, Delve Special, Ayres on the Air, Dial M For Pizza, Old Harry's Game, The Million Pound Radio Show, Revolting People, and No Commitments.

== Personal life ==
Montagu married Alan Nixon in 1984. They divorced in 2006. The couple have two children, Olivia and Luke. Felicity and Olivia worked together in 2016 in the BBC Radio 4 series Guilt Trip, in which they played a fictional mother and daughter.

== Filmography ==
Year	Title	Role	Notes
1985	Victoria Wood: As Seen on TV	Anthea	Episode: "Episode #1.5"
1985	Coming Through	Jesse Chambers	TV film
1986	We'll Think of Something	Celia	Episode: "You Know Who Your Friends Are"
1986	Who Dares Wins	Pregnant Woman	2 episodes
1987–1989	Ffizz	Griselda	12 episodes
1988	Tumbledown	Tricia	Television film
1988	This is David Lander	Linda Timson	Episode: "Reduced to Tears"
1988–1989	Alexei Sayle's Stuff	Various Roles	7 episodes
1989	Norbert Smith, a Life	Cecilia Johanson	Television film
1990	Wish Me Luck	Nicole Dissard	7 episodes
1990	Harry Enfield's Television Programme	Thirties Player	Episode: "Episode #1.1"
1991	The Bill	Pearce	Episode: "Furthers"
1991	Josie	Jacklyn	2 episodes
1991	Casualty	Karen Forrester	2 episodes
1991	Paul Merton: The Series	Various Characters	Episode: "Episode #1.6"
1992	Lovejoy	Deborah Frobisher	Episode: "Out to Lunch
1992	2Point4 Children	Janice	Episode: "I'm Going Slightly Mad"
1992	Funny Business	Performer	Episode: "Visual Comedy"
1993	Bonjour la Classe	Parent 2	Episode: "Red Card"
1993	KYTV	Horsey Woman	Episode: "Get Away with You"
1993–1995	Health and Efficiency	Dr. Kate Russell	12 episodes
1994	A Touch of Frost	Anne Butler	Episode: "Nothing to Hide"
1994	The All New Alexei Sayle Show	Various Characters	Episode: "Episode #1.6"
1995	Coogan's Run	Florence Mullinger	Episode: "Handyman for All Seasons"
1995–1998	Smith & Jones	Various	3 episodes
1997	Brass Eye	Dinner Party Guest (uncredited)	Episode: "Animals"
1997	Holding the Baby	Jane	Episode: "Episode #1.6"
1997	Hospital!	Sally	Television film
1997	Harry Enfield and Chums	Woman in Cholmondeley-Warner Film	Episode: "Harry Enfield and Christmas Chums"
1997–2002	I'm Alan Partridge	Lynn Benfield	12 episodes
1998	Hetty Wainthropp Investigates	Susan Dent	Episode: "Blood Relations"
1998	Babes in the Wood	Sasha	Episode: "Christmas Special"
1999	All Along the Watchtower	Mrs. Carter	Episode: "Keeping the Peace"
1999	Acts of Passion	Rosemary	Episode: "Hungry"
1999	People Like Us	Various	Episode: "The Estate Agent"
2000	The Mrs Bradley Mysteries	Ruby Larkin	Episode: "The Rising of the Moon"
2000	City Central	Jenny Wilson	Episode: "Everything Must Go"
2000	Trust	Beth Simpson	Television film
2000	Peak Practice	Marian Lowther	Episode: "On a Clear Day"
2001	Bridget Jones's Diary	Perpetua	
2001	Mr Charity	Mrs. Gilbert	Episode: "You and Whose Tsunami?"
2001	Dr. Terrible's House of Horrible	Lavinia	Episode: "And Now the Fearing..."
2003	The Eustace Bros.	Ginny Topley	Episode: "Episode #1.5"
2003	Blackball	Astronomer	
2003	The Crouches	Eileen	Episode: "Uncle Sonny"
2003	Hear the Silence	Mary Watt	Television film
2004–2005	Nighty Night	Sue Forks	10 episodes
2004–2007	My Life as a Popat	Ivy Saviour	5 episodes
2004–2013	Doc Martin	Caroline Bosman	7 episodes
2005	The Afternoon Play	Marjorie Goldblum	Episode: "The Singing Cactus"
2005	Bremner, Bird and Fortune	Unknown	Episode: "Episode #7.6"
2005	The Queen's Sister	Gillian Fleming	Television film
2005	Planet Sketch	Various (voice)	26 episodes
2006	Johnny and the Bomb	Mildred Seeley	2 episodes
2006	Uncle Dad	Mrs. Farquharson	Television series
2006	My Family	Lydia	Episode: "Dentally Unstable"
2006	Confetti	Vivian	
2006–2007	Suburban Shootout	Barbara du Prez	11 episodes
2007	I Want Candy	Val, Joe's Mum	
2007	Daphne	Director, 'September Tide'	Television film
2008	M.I. High	Big Sister/Mary Taylor	Episode: "Big Sister"
2008	How to Lose Friends & Alienate People	Clipboard Nazi	
2009	No Holds Bard	Paula Pickford	Television film
2009	Off the Hook	Danny's Mum/Mrs. Gordon	2 episodes
2009	Outnumbered	Mrs. Bain	Episode: "The Robbers"
2010	Skins	Anne	Episode: "Emily"
2010	The Increasingly Poor Decisions of Todd Margaret	Ms Whitehead	Episode: "The Snooker Player, the Black Canadian, the Turkish Terrorist, and the Peanut"
2011	North by Northamptonshire	Jan (voice)	Radio series
2011	Lead Balloon	Libby	Episode: "Off"
2011	Happy Clapper	Cath	Short film
2011	Comedy Showcase	Meriel	Episode: "Chickens"
2011	Chickens	Meriel	Episode: "Pilot"
2011	Rab C. Nesbitt	Reverend Biddulph	Episode: "Stool"
2011–2012	Little Crackers	Mrs. Peters/Mrs. Phipps	2 episodes
2012	Parents	Mary	Episode: "Episode #1.6"
2012	Just Desserts	Carol	Short film
2012–2013	Watson & Oliver	Various	2 episodes
2013	It's Kevin	Various	Episode: "Episode #1.2"
2013	Playhouse Presents	Meg	Episode: "Stage Door Johnnies"
2013	Alan Partridge: Alpha Papa	Lynn Benfield	
2013	You, Me & Them	Mags	Episode: "Three Dinners"
2014	The Slammer	Polly Meadows	Episode: "Polly Meadows"
2014	The Boy in the Dress	Miss Price	Television film
2014	Mapp & Lucia	Godiva "Diva" Plaistow	3 episodes
2014–2016	Hank Zipzer	Miss Adolf	38 episodes
2015	Funny Valentines	Isabel	Episode: "Last Chance"
2015	Two Down	Mrs. Hannon	
2015	BBC Comedy Feeds	Joy	Episode: "Fishbowl"
2016	Dad's Army	Elizabeth Mainwaring	
2016	The Alan Dimension	Wendy (voice)	Short film
2016	Brief Encounters	Joan	5 episodes
2016	Hank Zipzer's Christmas Catastrophe	Miss Adolf	Television film
2016–2019	The Durrells	Cousin Prue	4 episodes
2017	Husk	Mother	Short film
2017	Porridge	Caroline Hawley	Episode: "The Witness"
2017	The End of the F***ing World	Jocelyn	Episode: "Episode #1.6"
2017	Chinese Burn	Sue	Episode: "Pilot"
2017-2018	The Tunnel	Winnie Miles	6 episodes
2018	Urban Myths	Paula Strasberg	Episode: "Marilyn Monroe and Billy Wilder"
2018	Vanity Fair	Arabella Briggs	4 episodes
2018	Butterfly	Alice	2 episodes
2018	Zapped	Head Librarian	Episode: "Book"
2018	Sally4Ever	Eleanor	7 episodes
2018	Death on the Tyne	Denise	Television film
2018	It's Me, Sugar	Paula Strasberg	Short film
2019	The Road to Brexit	Jill Spiller	Television film
2019	Lasagne	Betty	Short film
2019	Four Weddings and a Funeral	Duffy's Mom	Episode: "New Jersey"
2019	National Theatre Live: A Midsummer Night's Dream	Quince	
2019–2021	This Time with Alan Partridge	Lynn Benfield	12 episodes
2020	Resistance	Mrs. Garner (Emma's Mother)	
2020	Heart to Heart	Hen Holligan	Short film
2020	Miss Marx	Helen Demuth	
2021	The Announcement	Patricia	Short film
2021	Censor	Valerie	
2021	Brassic	Lesley Anne	Episode: "Episode #3.1"
2021	Landscapers	Patricia Wycherley	3 episodes
2022	Sister Boniface Mysteries	Canoness Basil	Episode: "Lights, Camera, Murder!"
2022	Hullraisers	Gloria	2 episodes
2022	The Train	Tina	4 episodes
2023	Tom Jones	Bridget Allworthy	Episode: "Episode #1.1"
2023	Black Ops	Superintendent Edwards	6 episodes
2023–present	Beyond Paradise	Margo Martins	20 episodes
2025	Father Brown	Judith Skelton	Episode: "The Puzzle of Banburismus"
2025	Not Going Out	Yvonne	Episode: "Campervan"
2025	How Are You? It's Alan (Partridge)	Lynn Benfield	6 episodes
2025	The Cadburys	Mary Brown	
