= The Day Today =

1994 British television comedy show

- Created by: Chris Morris; Armando Iannucci
- Directed by: Andrew Gillman
- Starring: Christ Morris; Steve Coogan; Rebecca Front; Doon Mackichan; Patrick Marber; David Schneider
- Narrated by: Michael Alexander St John
- Music by: Jonathan Whitehead; Chris Morris
- Country of origin: United Kingdom
- Original language: English
- No. of series: 1
- No. of episodes: 6

Production
- Running time: 30 minutes
- Production company: Talkback Productions

Original release
- Network: BBC2
- Release: 19 January – 23 February 1994

Related
- On the Hour; Brass Eye; Knowing Me, Knowing You with Alan Partridge

The Day Today is a British comedy television show that parodies television news and current affairs programmes, broadcast from 19 January to 23 February 1994 on BBC2. It was created by Armando Iannucci and Chris Morris and is an adaptation of the radio programme On the Hour, which was broadcast on BBC Radio 4 between 9 August 1991 and 28 May 1992 and was also written by Morris, Iannucci, Steven Wells, Andrew Glover, Stewart Lee, Richard Herring, David Quantick, and the cast. For The Day Today, Peter Baynham joined the writing team, and Lee and Herring were replaced by Graham Linehan and Arthur Mathews. The principal cast of On the Hour was retained for The Day Today.

The Day Today is composed of six half-hour episodes and a selection of shorter five-minute slots recorded as promotional trailers for the longer episodes. The series won many awards including Morris winning the 1994 British Comedy Award for Best Newcomer. All six episodes are available on BBC DVD, having previously been issued on VHS.

== Format ==
Each episode is presented as a mock news programme, and the episodes rely on a combination of ludicrous fictitious news stories, covered with a serious, quasi-professional attitude. Each episode revolves around one or two major stories which are pursued throughout the programme, along with a host of other stories usually only briefly referred to. The programme dips into other channels from time to time, presents clips of fictitious upcoming BBC programmes, and conducts street interviews with passers-by in a segment titled Speak Your Brains.

It frequently comments on other programmes, most often a spoof soap opera called The Bureau, set in a 24-hour bureau de change, incorporating clichéd plots, which apparently produces and airs 2,000 episodes between the first and third episodes of The Day Today and becomes a hit in Italy. The programme also contains clips from a spoof documentary series called The Pool, featuring a public swimming pool and its neurotic staff, Morris' character explaining that The Day Today has funded a documentary on every public building in the country. The final episode features reports from the fictitious documentary The Office, which follows office workers as they go on a retreat with an efficiency expert. Other non-news segments of the programme include the occasional "physical cartoons" of current events set in the studio. Morris frequently parodies entirely separate channels, including RokTV (spoofing MTV); reporting on the fictitious and psychotically violent African-American rapper Fur-Q; and Genutainment, a segment which reports on a sheepdog averting a helicopter disaster in a parody of the real-life rescue show 999.

The programme occasionally features producer Armando Iannucci and writer Peter Baynham, the latter playing Gay Desk reporter Colin Poppshed, among other characters. John Thomson, Graham Linehan, Tony Haase and Minnie Driver also appear. Michael Alexander St John provides the voiceover stings, as he did in On the Hour.

Much of the programme's humour derives from its bombastic style of reporting and its unnecessarily elaborate graphics. The theme tune is deliberately overdramatic and self-important, and the opening sequence of each episode is lengthy and complex, a parody of the overuse of computer-generated credit sequences on news programmes (as the graphics throughout were developed and designed by ITN). One episode presents false adverts featuring depictions of The Day Today being broadcast in bizarre locations: the night sky over Paris, the sides of the Great Pyramid in Egypt, the "International Hackenbacker Building" in Chicago, and the handles of 400 million petrol pumps across the globe; this is a parody of CNN International's promotions advertising the hotels in which the channel could be seen.

The programme frequently lambasts Conservative government politicians in office at the time of the programme's production. Those repeatedly lampooned by the series include John Major, Michael Heseltine (who had his picture swapped with an old Bosnian woman), Chris Patten, Douglas Hurd, Virginia Bottomley, and Michael Portillo, in addition to US President Bill Clinton. Labour politician Paul Boateng also appears briefly in an interview about the fictitious musician 'Herman the Tosser'.

Each episode is brought to an interrupted ending with just enough time to quickly overview the following day's newspapers (a parody of Jeremy Paxman on BBC2's Newsnight) printed with absurd headlines such as "Lord Mayor's pirouette in fire chief wife decapitation" (which is referred to as 'grizzly but gripping'), "'crazed wolves in store a mistake', admits Mothercare" or "Russia elects cobweb" and a final humorously misused video. Each episode ends in a familiar style for news reports, with the camera panning out as the studio lights dim on Morris. Instead of shuffling his papers in clichéd newsreader style, Morris takes advantage of the dimming lights to perform bizarre activities; putting many pens in his jacket pockets, placing a tourniquet around his arm in preparation to inject heroin, removing his normal hair to reveal long blonde locks underneath, and, in the last episode, prostrating himself before the newsdesk.

In addition to the character Alan Partridge and many of the cast and writers, there are other crossovers between the fictional worlds of On the Hour, The Day Today and the radio and television series of Knowing Me Knowing You with Alan Partridge. With the exception of Patrick Marber, the entire main cast of The Day Today take guest roles in I'm Alan Partridge, in addition to writers Peter Baynham, Arthur Mathews and Graham Linehan. Marber is, however seen in a photograph on the wall of Peartree Productions.

== Notable coverage ==
The programme features surreal news items. Examples include:

- Reports that explosive-packed terrorist dogs were being released in London by the IRA. These "bomb dogs" wreak havoc, and prompt the British police to begin executing any dog on sight. This story is accompanied by a clip of Steve Coogan impersonating a Gerry Adams-esque Sinn Féin leader, spouting rhetoric while inhaling helium to subtract credibility from his statement. This was a satirical comment on broadcasters' responses to the law at the time, which prevented any Sinn Féin spokesperson from being heard in radio and television; their words would instead be dubbed by an actor speaking in a neutral tone of voice.
- Coverage of a feud between John Major and the Queen. The feud culminates in physical fighting between the two in Buckingham Palace, videoed by a secret reporter who comments on "loud swearing voices", "the sounds of bodies falling against furniture", and the "Prime Minister leaving with bleeding legs". Early coverage of the incident worsens the situation, and prompts Morris' character to air a propaganda reel reserved for national emergencies; film consisting of a sequence of subtly humorous scenarios (stockbrokers spend "playtime" outside the London Stock Exchange jumping and skipping; a paramedic comforting an injured old woman gives her a brief kiss on the cheek; a man with a cigarette gets the offer of a light from a group of six-year-olds), all set against a backdrop of patriotic British music ("Thaxted" by Gustav Holst), in an effort to boost British national solidarity. The feud ultimately ends with the Queen and her entourage marching on Downing Street to beat up John Major, and after the close of the incident, the Royal Mail issues a commemorative stamp featuring the Queen and John Major kissing.
- Coverage of an ongoing rail crisis, following a train trapped on the tracks in Hampshire. Trapped by a jammed semaphore signal, the stranded train rapidly becomes the scene of anarchy and paganism, its passengers reverting to an animalistic state.
- In the fifth episode, Morris provokes a war between Australia and Hong Kong as much of the episode revolves around bombastically over-the-top reports on the resulting conflict in a parody of the extensive and overdramatic media coverage of the Gulf War. Subsequent reports of the war delivered from "Eastmanstown in the Upper Cataracts, on the Australio-Hong-Kong border", are humorously blown out of proportion. At the end of the episode, a false advertisement features a three-tape VHS set of the war produced by The Day Today, featuring footage of the war and its origins, set against a backdrop of inappropriate pop music, a parody of tabloid television's tendency to "dumb down" stories and present serious events in a lighthearted manner.

Other stories included a report of two French boys who break into the Roman Catholic Church's computer databanks in order to change the Catholic catechism; an urgent report that the British pound had been stolen; reports of wild horses disrupting the London Underground; and reports that Crete had been kidnapped by Libya and that Japan had manufactured 16 identical Japans.

== Main characters ==
- Christopher Morris (Chris Morris) – the newsreader. Morris has several computers giving him the news instantly from around the world, and often interrupts segments in order to break in with more important stories. He is confrontational and aggressive, often arguing with reporters and insulting guests on-air, and at one stage provoking a war between Australia and Hong Kong. The character was described by the British Film Institute as "a gleeful, bloodlust hybrid of Jeremy Paxman and Michael Buerk". In The Day Today, Morris reprises his overzealous newsreader role from On the Hour.
- Collaterlie Sisters (alternative spelling: "Collately Sisters") (Doon Mackichan) – business correspondent. As satire of the incomprehensible nature of business news to the layperson, Sisters talks nonsensically about the world of business, padding out her reports with meaningless jargon ("Trading remained succulent for the rest of the day.") She uses bewildering graphics, mainly when addressing the currency market, using such aids as the "Currency Cat", the "Currency Kidney", and the "International Finance Arse". Sisters also employs odd syntaxes, reciting strangely arranged sentences in a semi-robotic deadpan fashion (often smirking at arbitrary points in the monologue) and frequently name-checking Chris in the middle of her reports. During her reports, a news ticker scrolls across the bottom, displaying meaningless symbols. Morris can sometimes be heard making scathing remarks about her. In one episode, he asks for Sisters to be taken off his monitor as "I don't want to see her face".
- Sylvester Stuart (David Schneider) – the weatherman. Only Stuart's head is seen, usually floating on a graphic background. He describes the weather with elliptical analogies such as "That's about as warm as going into a heated drawing room after chopping some wood" and describing gloomy weather as "a bit like waking up next to a corpse." His reports have included the "Metball", a pinball-style graphic of the British Isles with Stuart's face as the ball, and another featuring the "Weather Collar", a large collar with the British Isles painted on it, rotating his head to face different areas of the country.
- Barbara Wintergreen (Rebecca Front) – correspondent on The Day Today's American sister channel CBN. Speaking with an exaggerated American accent, Wintergreen reports on the multiple executions of mass murderer Chapman Baxter (Patrick Marber) by a variety of bizarre methods, and on US couples having a prosthetic pregnancy. All her reports make use of convoluted puns and interviews with stereotypical stock characters in American culture (including Steve Coogan as dimwitted Southerner Alvin Holler). Wintergreen's reports end with a joke and pouting at the camera. The CBN reports are presented in a different format to other reports shown in the episodes; her segments are made using different shooting and editing techniques which mimic the appearance of American news, while the content of her reports satirises common British perceptions of the American media. The segments went through excessive processing to accentuate the reduction in picture quality typical of standards conversion of the time. The character of Barbara Wintergreen originated in On the Hour, which also featured a character identical to Chapman Baxter, played by Marber and named "Daimler Jeffries".
- Peter O'Hanraha-hanrahan (Patrick Marber) – economic correspondent. O'Hanraha-hanrahan is extremely incompetent, and his reports end with him having to admit their fundamental inaccuracy to an unforgiving Morris. Examples include a claim that an American factory with only 25,000 workers had made 35,000 redundant; a failed effort to conduct a light-hearted interview with a shipping minister; and a report in which O'Hanraha-hanrahan claims to have conducted an interview with an elusive economics minister in the German language, his ignorance of which is then exposed. O'Hanraha-hanrahan resembles former BBC newsreader Richard Whitmore; his name is inspired by that of Brian Hanrahan. The character originated from writing by Stewart Lee and Richard Herring, in the second series of On the Hour.
- Rosy May (Rebecca Front) – environmental correspondent. The bearded Rosy May presents the Enviromation slot. Her stories include the sky detaching from the horizon; a mobile cemetery; a ban on wave hunting; and a refrigerator powered by earthworms. Her segments end with a new-age style epigram, such as "Tread not on the forest leaves, for you tread on my face". May never interacts with other members of the news team. The character originated in On the Hour, although in that series, her segment is titled Green Desk. (The CD releases of On the Hour spell the character's name as "Rosie May", but the Enviromation ident in The Day Today identifies her as "Rosy May".)
- Jaques-'Jaques' Liverot (Patrick Marber) – resident French commentator. Depicted as a stereotypical postmodernist philosopher, eternally smoking alone in a dark and gloomy corner of the studio, Liverot comments on the news throughout the programme, using a series of pseudo-existentialist bons mots. He asks rhetorical questions, such as "If we could see politics, what would it look like?" and makes philosophical statements, such as "An old man stands naked in front of a mirror, eating soup. He is a fool."
- Valerie Sinatra (Rebecca Front) – travel correspondent. Sinatra works in The Day Today travel pod, perched at the top of a tower a mile above the centre of Great Britain. The traffic reports cover accidents such as a piece of pie blocking the road and coverage of an ongoing crash that has been in progress south of Newcastle upon Tyne for several weeks; police marksmen to shoot speeding drivers in the chin; as well as general traffic reports including a claim that workers have finished cobbling the M25 and that cars are being slowed down by their own lights. Morris flirts with her at the start and end of her reports.
- Brant (David Schneider) – the physical cartoonist from The Daily Telegraph. Brant satirises the news using cartoon backgrounds and then acting as the main character in the cartoon itself. His cartoons rely on elaborate physical metaphors which have to be labelled to render them comprehensible; an example is his cartoon of Britain's handover of Hong Kong, where Chris Patten, "making a monkey of himself", is represented as King (Hong) Kong climbing the British Empire State Building, swatting at aeroplanes representing China and the handover year of 1997. Each cartoon ends with his signature. The visual style is reminiscent of Nicholas Garland, a real Daily Telegraph political cartoonist, and the cumbersome labelling of political cartoons generally.
- Alan Partridge (Steve Coogan) – sports correspondent. Partridge is an old-school lower-middle-class Conservative who has little knowledge of the sports he is covering, and frequently makes critical errors on-air which reveal this. However, unlike the similarly incompetent Peter O'Hanraha-hanrahan, he is adept enough at improvisation to often mask his ignorance of the subject at hand. Morris makes a point of making Partridge appear uncomfortable on-air: in one episode, his sports reports are interrupted three times by Morris; in another, Morris openly humiliates Partridge on-air; and in the final episode, Morris atypically compliments Partridge on his report, and goes so far as to kiss him on the mouth. The character had previously appeared, portrayed by Coogan, in the Radio 4 shows On the Hour and Knowing Me Knowing You with Alan Partridge and would go on to star in the TV series Knowing Me, Knowing You... with Alan Partridge, I'm Alan Partridge and the movie Alan Partridge: Alpha Papa.
- Ted Maul (Chris Morris) – the roving reporter who later appears in Brass Eye made his first appearance in The Day Today as a grey-haired, moustachioed veteran, with a very enthusiastically aggressive style of reporting. His reports include one on cannibalism in the police force, and a long-running report covering commuters trapped on a train, who turn to paganism and violence during their wait on the line.

One-off correspondents in the series have absurd names, and include Hellwyn Ballard (Armando Iannucci), Iggy Pop Barker (Marber), Romella Belx (Front), Dônnnald Bethl'hem (Marber), Eugene Fraxby (Morris), Suzanna Gekkaloys (Mackichan), Pheeona Haahlahm (Mackichan), Collin Haye (Morris), Remedy Malahide (Front), Spartacus Mills (Coogan), Colin Poppshed (Peter Baynham), Beverley Smax (Mackichan) and Suki Bapswent (Morris in drag, as part of the RokTV spoof which also features Harfynn Teuport, with Morris putting on a generic Dutch accent). David Schneider also plays The Day Today's News Dancer, who performs an energetic interpretive dance routine as an accompaniment to some news stories.

== Cast and crew ==
Cast

- Chris Morris as Christopher Morris, Ted Maul, other roles
- Steve Coogan as Alan Partridge, Alvin Holler, Mr. Hennity of The Bureau, Spartacus Mills, other roles
- Rebecca Front as Barbara Wintergreen, Rosy May, Valerie Sinatra, Ange of The Bureau, other roles
- Doon Mackichan as Collaterlie Sisters, Maria of The Bureau, other roles
- Patrick Marber as Peter O'Hanraha-hanrahan, Jaques-'Jaques' Liverot, Chapman Baxter, Guy of The Bureau, other roles
- David Schneider as Sylvester Stewart, Brant, Alex of The Bureau, other roles
- Michael Alexander St John – voiceover

The Day Today also features appearances by show co-creator Armando Iannucci, also by Peter Baynham, Jean Ainslie, John Thomson, Graham Linehan, Alan Stocks and Minnie Driver.

Crew

- Chris Morris – writing, music, production
- Armando Iannucci – writing, production
- Peter Baynham – writing
- Andrew Glover – additional material
- Steven Wells – additional material
- David Quantick – additional material
- Graham Linehan – additional material
- Arthur Mathews – additional material
- Andrew Gillman – direction
- Jonathan Whitehead – music

== Episodes ==
No.	Title	Original release date
1	"Main News Attack"	19 January 1994
Features reports on Prince Charles volunteering to go to prison, the London Jam Festival, bullying in the Church of England, medieval alternative medicine, and a sheep dog piloting an out of control helicopter. Also features Barbara Wintergreen's report on the Elvis-styled execution of American serial killer Chapman Baxter, and Alan Partridge covering the Tour de France and boxing.
2	"The Big Report"	26 January 1994
Features reports on the junior minister for health resigning, Marlon Brando being sold at auction in Sotheby's, illegal back street dentists, and Peter O'Hanraha-hanrahan reporting on the new European trade quota rates. Also features part one of The Pool (a documentary set in a public swimming pool), a segment from RokTV (featuring Morris as presenters Harfynn Teuport and Sukie Bapswent, Nirvana frontman Kurt Cobain, rapper Fur Q, and Rolling Stone editor Derrin Zikks), and Alan Partridge covering the horse racing at Marple.
3	"Meganews"	2 February 1994
Features reports on an infestation of wild horses in the London Underground, the BBC's new soap opera The Bureau (replaces the Nine O'Clock News), a fight between the Queen and John Major (with an emergency broadcast related to the event), and an air jam over Heathrow. Also features Barbara Wintergreen's report on Chapman Baxter being executed via marriage, a continuation of The Pool, and Alan Partridge interviewing football players and an Australian female show jumper.
4	"Stretchcast"	9 February 1994
Features reports on suspicions that British police officers are eating their suspects, Peter O'Hanraha-hanrahan interviewing the government minister for ships regarding recent accusations, the IRA's use of explosives hidden in dogs, the immense popularity of The Bureau in Italy, the Home Office releasing the Sorted videos aimed at young people, and near-death experiences. Also features Barbara Wintergreen reporting on the natus (a method of prosthetic pregnancy), and Alan Partridge's countdown to the 1994 World Cup.
5	"Magnifevent"	16 February 1994
Features reports on the British pound being stolen, the plummeting ratings of The Bureau, the clamping of the homeless in London, a reminiscence of events in 1944, government ministers contracting a disease that inhibits reading, and the trade agreement in a subsequent war between Australia and Hong Kong. Also features Barbara Wintergreen reporting on Chapman Baxter being executed by the reanimated corpse of his last victim, and Alan Partridge riding with a female rally driver.
6	"Newsatrolysis" / "Factgasm"	23 February 1994
Features reports on Buckingham Palace culling 40 members of staff, passengers stuck on a train in Hampshire and resorting to paganism, Peter O'Hanraha-hanrahan reporting on General Motors making 35,000 workers redundant, Colin Poppshed reporting from the gay desk, the decline of the NHS, and a roundup of international news. Also features The Office (a documentary set at the office of a pharmaceutical company), and Alan Partridge covering self-defence.

== Reception ==
The Day Today was described as "achingly funny" by the Daily Mirror and "the freshest and funniest comedy since Monty Python" by The Independent. NME's review was mixed, calling it "not exactly hilarious".

== DVD bonus material ==
The DVD features extensive bonus material, including short episodes featuring original material that were broadcast the night before each episode's original transmission, the original pilot episode, and an Open University programme about news presentation which includes an analysis of how and why parodies such as The Day Today work.

The DVD also includes several "easter eggs" including: a version of a State of the Union Address by George W. Bush, edited to make United States policy seem insanely belligerent; a new audio discussion between Morris and Alan Partridge discussing bizarre theories of how Diana, Princess of Wales, and John F. Kennedy died; a further discussion between Morris and Partridge about the environment; a reunion of Morris, Partridge, Brant, Peter O'Hanraha-hanrahan, Collaterlie Sisters and Valerie Sinatra; and another audio sketch featuring Peter O'Hanraha-hanrahan pretending to file a report from the World Trade Center covering up the fact that he had overslept, while blithely unaware about the attacks on 11 September 2001 have just taken place. Pressing the Angle button during the third episode unveils brief, intermittent visual descriptions of the episode by Andy Hodgson and Jennifer Reinfrank, whilst a half-hour interview with Steve Coogan, conducted by Mark Radcliffe on 17 January 1994 edition of his radio show, can be accessed through the extended scenes menu.
