= Alan Partridge =

British comedy character

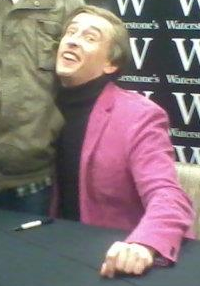
- Coogan in character as Alan Partridge at a 2011 book signing
- First appearance: On the Hour (1991)
- Created by: Steve Coogan; Armando Iannucci
- Portrayed by: Steve Coogan

In-universe information
- Full name: Alan Gordon Partridge
- Occupation: Broadcaster
- Spouse: Carol (divorced)
- Children: Fernando Partridge; Denise Partridge

Alan Gordon Partridge is a British comedy character portrayed by Steve Coogan. A parody of British television personalities, Partridge is a tactless and inept broadcaster with politically incorrect views and an inflated ego. Since his debut in 1991, he has appeared in radio and television series, books, podcasts and a feature film.

Partridge was created by Coogan and Armando Iannucci for the 1991 BBC Radio 4 comedy programme On the Hour, a spoof of British current affairs broadcasting. In 1992, Partridge hosted a spin-off spoof chat show, Knowing Me, Knowing You with Alan Partridge. On the Hour transferred to television as The Day Today in 1994, followed by Knowing Me, Knowing You later that year. In 1997, the BBC broadcast I'm Alan Partridge, a sitcom written by Coogan, Iannucci and Peter Baynham about Partridge's life in a roadside hotel working for a Norwich radio station. It earned two BAFTA awards and was followed by a second series in 2002.

After a hiatus, Partridge returned in 2010 with a series of shorts, Mid Morning Matters with Alan Partridge, written with Rob and Neil Gibbons, who, with Coogan, have co-written every Partridge project since. The one-hour special Welcome to the Places of My Life earned Coogan a BAFTA for best male performance in a comedy. Over the following years, Partridge expanded into other media, including the spoof memoir I, Partridge: We Need to Talk About Alan (2011) and the feature film Alpha Papa (2013). In 2019, Partridge returned to the BBC with This Time with Alan Partridge, a spoof of magazine shows such as The One Show, followed by Partridge's first Audible podcast in 2020 and a touring show in 2022. For the 2025 spoof documentary series How Are You? It's Alan (Partridge), Coogan won a BAFTA for best actor in a comedy.

Coogan said Partridge began as a "one-note" character, but slowly became more complex and empathetic. While the writers use Partridge to satirise bigotry and privilege, they also aim to create empathy. Critics have praised Partridge's complexity, realism and pathos. Vanity Fair called him a British national treasure and The Guardian described him as "one of the greatest and most beloved comic creations of the last few decades". In a 2001 poll by Channel 4, Partridge was voted seventh in their list of the 100 greatest TV characters. Partridge is credited with influencing cringe comedies such as The Inbetweeners, Nighty Night and Peep Show.

== History ==
=== 1991: On the Hour ===
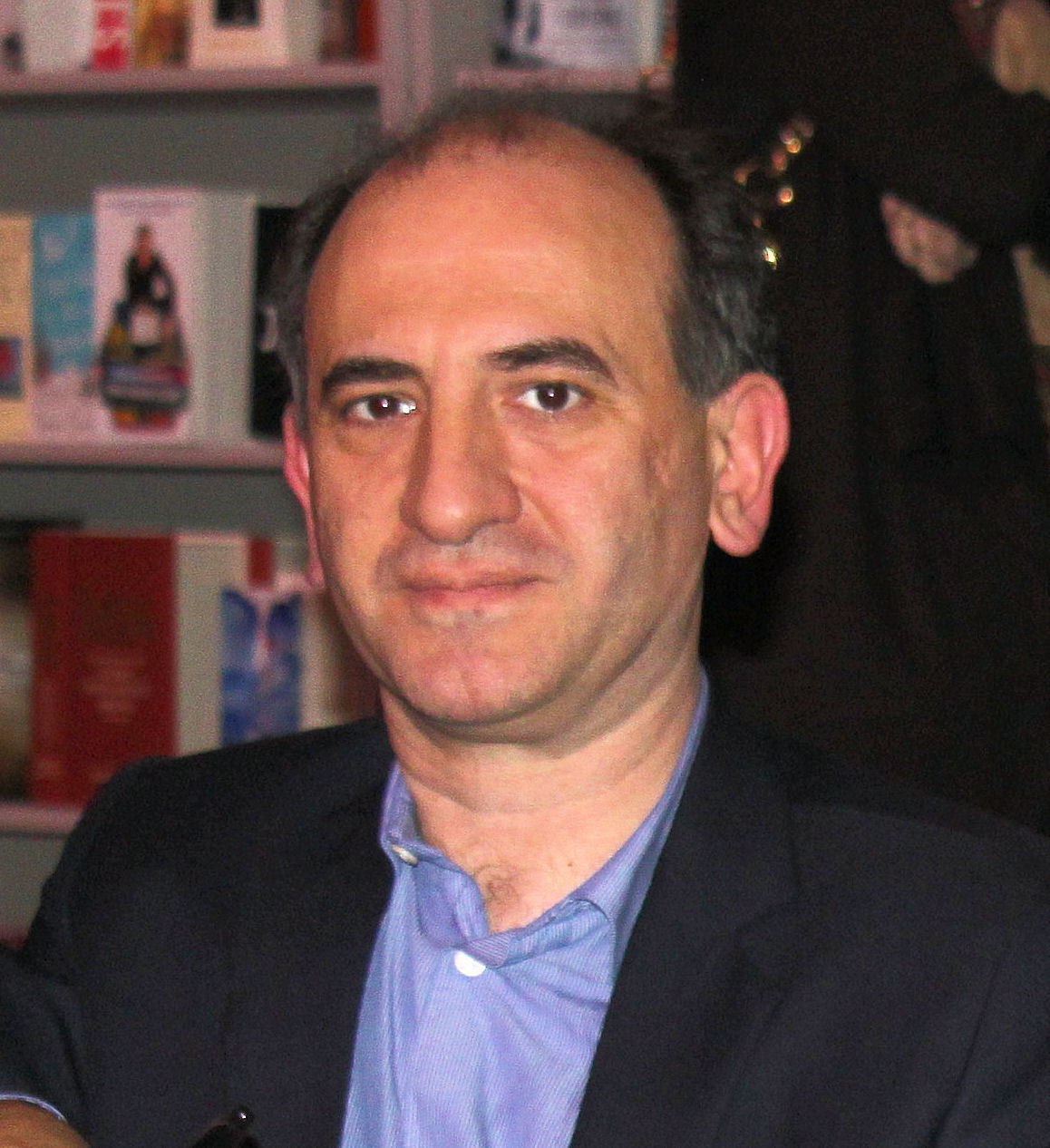
Armando Iannucci (pictured in 2010) created Partridge with Coogan in 1991 and co-wrote several projects.

Alan Partridge was created for the 1991 BBC Radio 4 comedy programme On the Hour, a spoof of British current affairs broadcasting, as the show's hapless sports presenter. The producer, Armando Iannucci, asked Steve Coogan to voice a generic sports reporter with elements of Elton Welsby, Jim Rosenthal and John Motson. Coogan had performed a similar character for a BBC college radio station while at university. Iannucci said they developed a backstory "within minutes". The name was inspired by the former Newsbeat presenter Frank Partridge. Iannucci, Patrick Marber, Richard Herring and Stewart Lee wrote much of the early Partridge material; Herring credits the creation to Coogan and Iannucci.

=== 1992–1996: Knowing Me, Knowing You and The Day Today ===
Marber felt Partridge had potential for other projects, and encouraged Coogan to develop his character. Coogan performed as Partridge and other characters at the 1992 Edinburgh Fringe. That December, BBC Radio 4 began broadcasting a six-episode spoof chat show, Knowing Me, Knowing You with Alan Partridge. The series saw Partridge irritate and offend his guests, and coined his catchphrase, "Aha!".

In 1994, On the Hour transferred to television on BBC Two as The Day Today, in which Partridge reprised his role as sports reporter. Later that year, Knowing Me, Knowing You transferred to television. The series ends with Partridge accidentally shooting a guest. It was nominated for the 1995 BAFTA award for Light Entertainment Performance. A Christmas special, Knowing Me, Knowing Yule, followed in December 1995, in which Partridge attacks a BBC commissioning editor, ending his television career.

At the 1996 Labour Party Conference, Coogan interviewed the Labour leader, Tony Blair, in character as Partridge. Iannucci recalled that Blair did not realise Partridge was a fictional character and that his campaign director, Alastair Campbell, instructed him to tell journalists that Blair had a "great sense of humour".

=== 1997–2002: I'm Alan Partridge ===
In 1997, BBC Two broadcast a sitcom, I'm Alan Partridge, written by Coogan, Iannucci and Peter Baynham. It follows Partridge after he has been left by his wife and dropped from the BBC. He lives in a roadside hotel outside Norwich, presents a graveyard slot on local radio, and desperately pitches ideas for new television shows. Iannucci described the series as "a kind of social X-ray of male middle-aged Middle England". I'm Alan Partridge won the 1998 BAFTA awards for Comedy Performance and Comedy Programme or Series.

In 1999, Partridge appeared on the BBC telethon Comic Relief, performing a medley of Kate Bush songs. BBC Two broadcast a second series of I'm Alan Partridge in 2002, following Partridge's life in a static home with his new Ukrainian girlfriend, Sonia (Amelia Bullmore), after recovering from a mental breakdown. The writers found the second series difficult to make, feeling it had been too long since the first and that expectations for sitcoms had changed.

=== 2003–2009: Hiatus and smaller roles ===
After I'm Alan Partridge, Coogan limited Partridge to smaller roles, feeling he had become an "albatross". In March 2003, the BBC broadcast a mockumentary, Anglian Lives: Alan Partridge, about Partridge's life and career. Coogan performed as Partridge at the Royal Albert Hall in support of the Teenage Cancer Trust in 2004. In 2008, he performed a tour, Steve Coogan as Alan Partridge and other Less Successful Characters, featuring Partridge as a life coach.

Coogan returned to Partridge after pursuing other projects, such as his work with the director Michael Winterbottom on films such as 24 Hour Party People (2002). He said he did not want to end the character, and that "as long as I can do my other things, that, to me, is the perfect balance". In 2020, Coogan said that though he had once tired of Partridge, he had now become "a battered, comfortable old leather jacket".

=== 2010: Mid Morning Matters ===
Partridge returned in 2010 in a series of YouTube shorts, Mid Morning Matters with Alan Partridge, as the host of a digital radio show with a new character, Sidekick Simon (Tim Key). The series was later broadcast by Sky Atlantic. Coogan wrote it with the brothers Neil and Rob Gibbons, who submitted scripts to his company Baby Cow Productions. The Gibbons brothers have co-written every Partridge project since. According to Neil, "Our sensibilities chimed ... I think we were like two pairs of fresh eyes, and Steve seemed to fall in love with the character all over again."

Coogan said they chose the web format because "it was a bit underground, a low-key environment in which to test the character out again. And the response was so good, we realised there was more fuel in the tank." In his 2015 autobiography, Coogan wrote that he felt Mid Morning Matters was "the purest, most mature and funniest incarnation of Partridge", which he credited to the Gibbons brothers.

=== 2011–2012: I, Partridge and TV specials ===
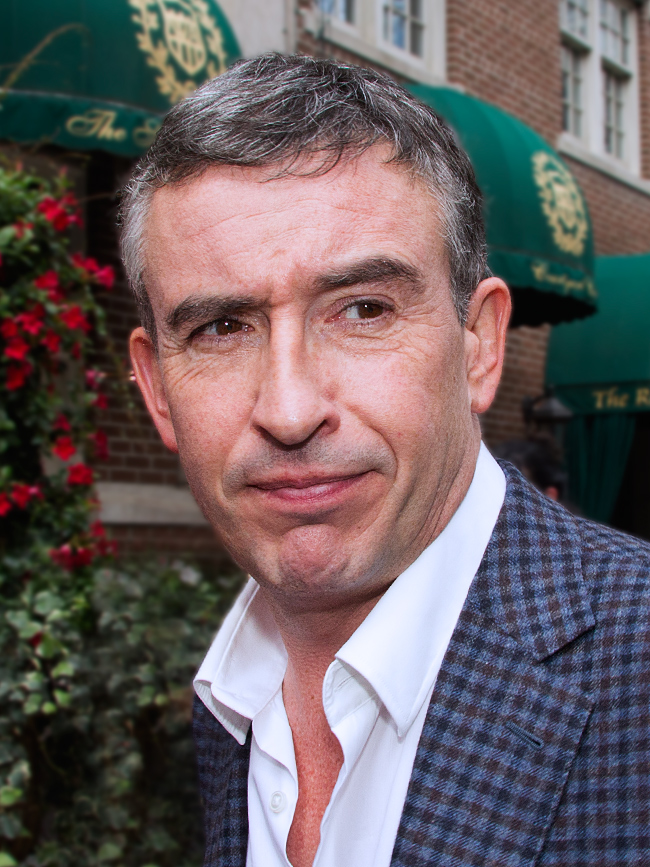
Steve Coogan in 2013

In 2011, a spoof autobiography, I, Partridge: We Need to Talk About Alan, written by Coogan, Iannucci and the Gibbons brothers, was published by HarperCollins. Coogan also recorded an audiobook version as Partridge. In the book, Partridge recounts his childhood and career, attempts to settle scores with people he feels have wronged him, and dispenses wisdom such as his assertion that Wikipedia has made university education "all but pointless". Coogan appeared as Partridge to promote I, Partridge on The Jonathan Ross Show and BBC Radio 5 Live. It received positive reviews and became a bestseller.

On 25 June 2012, Partridge presented a one-hour Sky Atlantic special, Alan Partridge: Welcome to the Places of My Life, taking the viewer on a tour of Partridge's home county, Norfolk. It earned Coogan the 2013 BAFTA for Best Male Performance in a Comedy Programme. The following week, Sky Atlantic broadcast Open Books with Martin Bryce, a mock literary programme discussing Partridge's autobiography.

=== 2013: Alpha Papa ===
On 7 August 2013, a feature film, Alan Partridge: Alpha Papa, was released in the UK. It was directed by Declan Lowney and co-produced by StudioCanal and Baby Cow Productions, with support from BBC Films and the BFI Film Fund. The film sees Partridge enlisted as a crisis negotiator during a siege at his radio station.

Filming began with an incomplete script, and Coogan and the Gibbons brothers rewrote much of it on the set. The rushed production was difficult; Coogan and Iannucci disagreed on the script, morale was low, and there were problems with casting and funding. In his memoir, Coogan wrote that it was the hardest he had ever worked and the loneliest he had ever felt; however, he was proud of the finished film. Alpha Papa received positive reviews and opened at number one at the box office in the UK and Ireland.

=== 2015–2019: Scissored Isle and This Time ===
In 2015, Coogan co-presented a special Christmas episode of the Channel 4 chat show TFI Friday as Partridge. In February 2016, Sky Atlantic broadcast a second series of Mid Morning Matters. Alan Partridge's Scissored Isle, a mockumentary in which Partridge examines the British class divide, followed in May also starring Ben Rufus Green. A second book, Alan Partridge: Nomad, a travelogue in which Partridge recounts a journey across the UK, was published on 20 October.

In July 2017, Partridge appeared in an episode of the BBC Radio 4 programme Inheritance Tracks, in which guests choose music to pass to future generations; he selected "Who Put the Bomp (in the Bomp, Bomp, Bomp)" by Barry Mann and the theme from Grandstand. Iannucci guest-edited an October 2017 issue of The Big Issue, featuring a debate on Brexit between Partridge and Malcolm Tucker, a character from The Thick of It, another sitcom created by Iannucci. On 27 December, BBC Two broadcast a documentary about the history of Partridge, Alan Partridge: Why, When, Where, How and Whom?

Partridge returned to the BBC in February 2019 with a six-part series, This Time with Alan Partridge, a spoof current affairs programme in the style of The One Show. Coogan felt it was the right time for Partridge to return as he might represent the views of Brexit voters. Neil Gibbons said the world of live television had changed since Partridge's creation: "If someone fluffed a line or got someone's name wrong or said something stupid, it was mortifying. But nowadays, those are the sort of people who are given jobs on TV." A second series was broadcast in 2021, ending with Partridge having a breakdown on air and being locked out of the BBC building.

In August 2019, after he was caught speeding, Coogan escaped a driving ban after arguing that a planned Partridge series could not be filmed on public transport, as driving is part of Partridge's character. The magistrates determined that it would cause "exceptional hardship" on the production staff if the series were cancelled.

=== 2020–present: From the Oasthouse, Stratagem and How Are You? ===
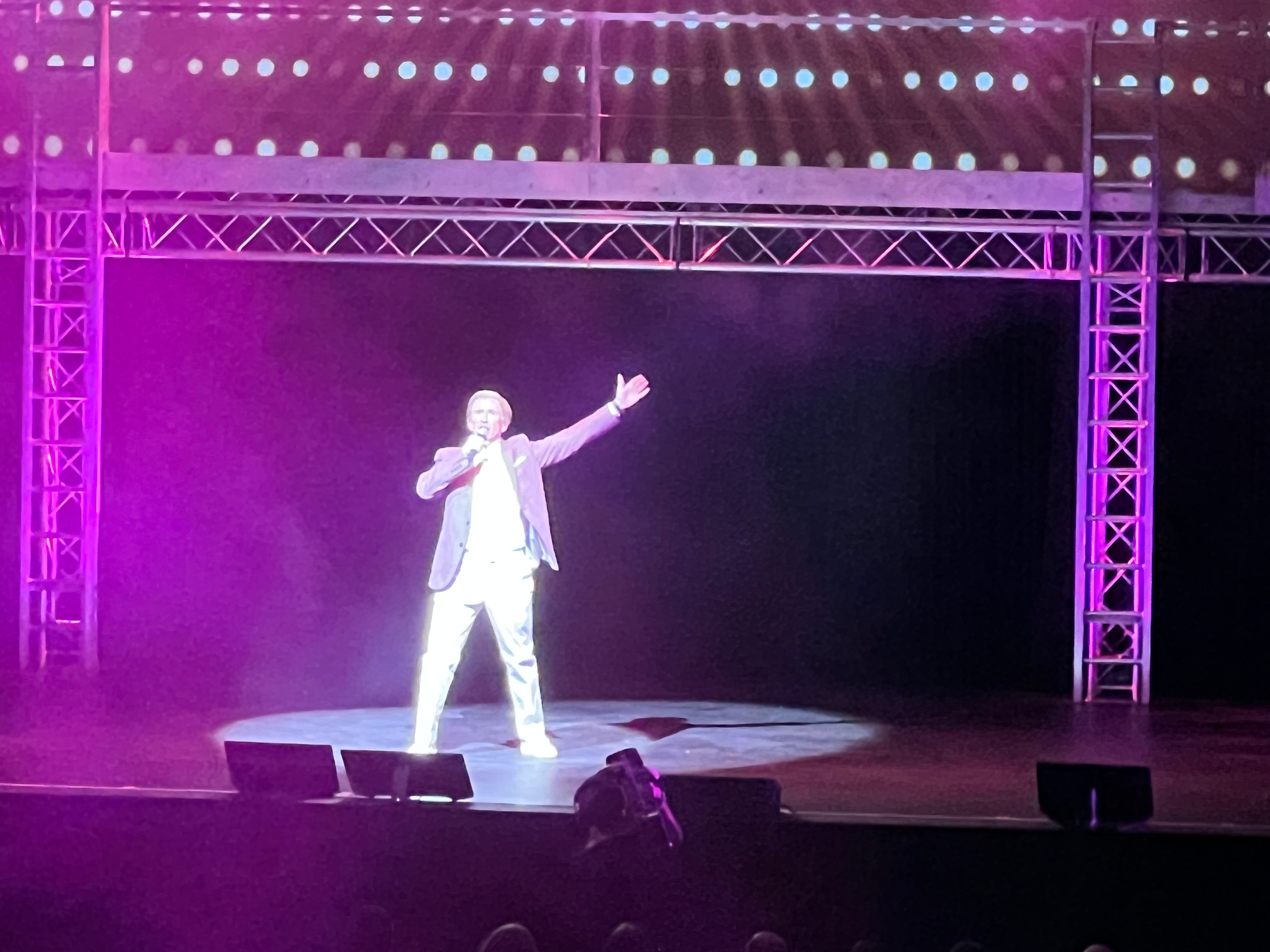
Coogan performing as Alan Partridge in Brighton in May 2022

In September 2020, Audible launched an Alan Partridge podcast, From the Oasthouse. It has Partridge discussing topics such as relationships, family and the culture wars. Coogan said the podcast format was liberating, with more opportunity for nuance and less need to create punchlines to unite the audience. The podcast was carefully scripted rather than improvised. Further series were released in September 2022, October 2023 and June 2025.

In April 2022, Coogan began a UK Alan Partridge tour, Stratagem, in which Partridge gave a motivational talk and addressed topics such as identity politics and culture wars. The Guardian critic Brian Logan gave the show four out of five, praising its "rich comedy of physical awkwardness" and writing that Partridge was now "at the centre of his own thriving multi-platform metaverse". He noted that though Coogan had once tired of Partridge, he now "clearly takes pleasure in the performance". The Independent critic Louis Chilton gave it two out of five, finding its jokes obvious and dated and that Partridge did not work in a live format.

In August 2022, Partridge joined the rock band Coldplay to perform the 1985 Kate Bush song "Running Up That Hill" at Wembley Stadium, London. A third Partridge memoir, Big Beacon, covering his return to television and his experience restoring a lighthouse, was published in October 2023. The Times gave it a positive review, praising its "skilfully terrible writing". To promote the fourth series of From the Oasthouse, a Partridge-themed garden was created at the 2025 Hampton Court Garden Festival. Coogan said the writers were happy to use Partridge in such marketing because it was in character for him to pursue desperate promotional opportunities.

In October 2025, a spoof documentary series, How Are You? It's Alan (Partridge), was broadcast on BBC One. It features Partridge exploring mental health issues after losing his job with the BBC and taking various trivial corporate endorsements. He is oblivious to the infidelity of his new girlfriend, Katrina. The Guardian critic Jack Seale gave it four out of five, writing that "the subject matter here allows for the glimpses into Alan's soul that have been there ever since the Gibbons brothers took over co-writing duties". Coogan won the 2026 BAFTA for Best Actor in a Comedy for his performance.

== Character ==
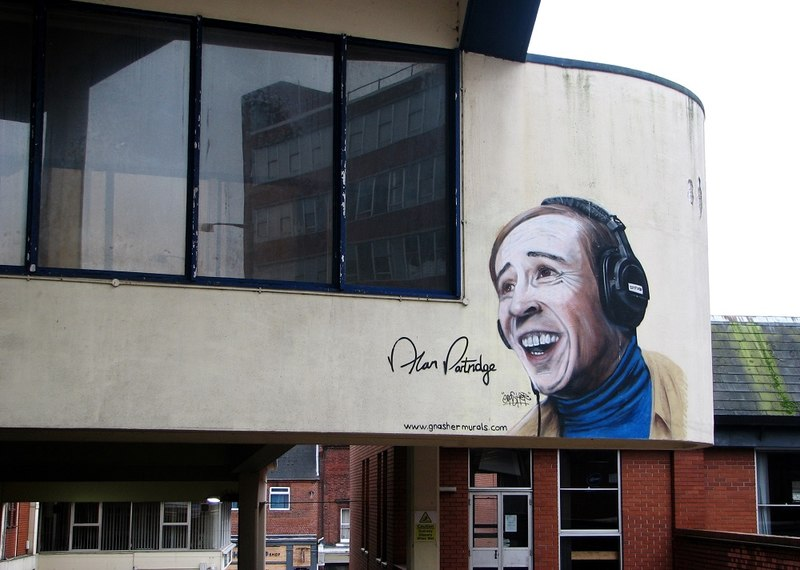
A mural on the Hollywood Cinema in Norwich, where Alpha Papa premiered in 2013

Alan Partridge is an incompetent and tactless television and radio presenter, with an inflated sense of importance and celebrity. He is socially inept and often offends his guests. His need for public attention drives him to deceit, treachery and shameless self-promotion. In the Knowing Me, Knowing Yule Christmas special, he assaults a BBC boss and a paralysed man. Marber said Partridge's fundamental characteristic is desperation, and described him as part of a British tradition of "sad little man" characters such as Captain Mainwaring, Basil Fawlty and David Brent.

Coogan said Partridge was originally a "one-note, sketchy character" and "freak show", but slowly became refined as a dysfunctional alter ego. Whereas Coogan has affection for Partridge, he said Iannucci sees him as "basically an idiot". As he aged, Coogan became comfortable in revealing unattractive and dysfunctional parts of himself in Partridge. In his memoir, he wrote that he finds it irritating when people observe that he is sometimes similar, and wrote: "I reply, 'Well, yes. Of course I am.' They can't quite believe this admission. 'But he's an idiot! Are you saying he's part of you?' As patiently as possible, I'll say, '"Yes, because part of me is an idiot!'"

Coogan credited Neil and Rob Gibbons for giving Partridge a more rounded personality in later incarnations, and said: "The 21st-century Alan is a nicer man. He is more empathetic and less about mocking the fool. More Malvolio and less Frank Spencer." The Gibbons brothers felt that by the time of Mid Morning Matters with Alan Partridge, when Partridge is working for an even smaller radio station, he is more at peace with himself and that his lack of self-awareness saves him from misery. Iannucci said that Partridge stays optimistic because he never sees himself as others see him, and that despite his failings he was "the perfect broadcaster for these times, when there are 24 hours to fill and dead time is a crime—he has a unique capacity to fill any vacuum with his own verbal vacuum". The Guardian critic Rachel Aroesti wrote that Partridge was arrogant, petty and did not feel guilt, but resilient, determined and seemingly impervious to criticism.

Baynham said that although Partridge is unpleasant, the writers of I'm Alan Partridge tried to build empathy: "You're watching a man suffer but also at some level identifying with his pain." For Alpha Papa, Coogan wanted Partridge to be heroic and for the audience to sympathise with him while laughing at him: "You know he's done the wrong thing, but at least he's got some humanity. It's impossible to sustain 90 minutes of good drama without investing in the character."

Felicity Montagu plays Partridge's loyal assistant, Lynn Benfield, a bigoted and manipulative baptist. Though Partridge sometimes bullies Lynn, he also relies on her. Baynham said their relationship was based on the "strange intimacy" people have with assistants, who often know their employer's most sensitive information. The Gibbons brothers described the relationship as "intimate but affection-free". According to Iannucci, the writers liked the idea that Partridge had employed an assistant out of a sense of self-importance and that he liked having a mother figure in his life. Montagu felt Partridge was vulnerable and loveable, and a good person "deep down".

=== Politics ===
Partridge holds right-wing views. He is reads the right-wing newspaper the Daily Mail and supported Brexit in line with the Daily Mail position. Coogan, who is left-wing, described Partridge as a Little Englander, with a "myopic, slightly philistine mentality". Coogan said the humour came from Partridge's poor judgement, rather than in a celebration of bigotry: "I don't want to add to the sum total of human misery. I want to point out things where we can improve our behaviour, myself included." He aimed to use humour to hold privileged and powerful people accountable.

Earlier versions of Partridge were more bigoted, but the writers found more humour in having him attempt to be progressive. For example, in I, Partridge, he stresses his friendship with the gay television presenter Dale Winton. Coogan said Partridge was aware of political correctness: "In the same way that the Daily Mail is a bit PC—it wouldn't be openly homophobic now—Alan is the same. He tries to be modern."

=== Lifestyle ===
Partridge lives in Norwich in the East of England. Iannucci said the writers chose Norwich as it is "geographically just that little bit annoyingly too far from London, and has this weird kind of isolated feel that seemed right for Alan". According to Forbes, Partridge has "parochial bad taste", and Coogan described him as "on the wrong side of cool". He is a fan of James Bond films and Lexus cars. His talk show catchphrase, "Aha!", comes from ABBA, and he named his son Fernando and his chat show Knowing Me, Knowing You after ABBA songs.

In earlier incarnations, Partridge's wardrobe included a blazer, badge and tie, driving gloves and "too-short" shorts, styles he described as "sports casual" and "imperial leisure". According to Iannucci, by the time of Alpha Papa, Partridge had "evolved to the Top Gear presenter circa 2005 stage", with sports jackets and a foppish fringe. As Coogan aged, the makeup he wore in earlier performances became unnecessary. In the 2025 series How Are You? It's Alan (Partridge), Partridge had dyed hair "several shades too light to be plausible" and wore chinos, body warmers and smart-casual shoes. Coogan wrote that the rise of postmodernism made it difficult to find clothes for Partridge, as "everything we had once seen as square or distasteful was now being worn by hipsters ... The waters of what was uncool became so muddied that it was difficult to find anything [that] looked bad and not just ironic. It even made me question if Alan was still relevant."

== Legacy ==
Vanity Fair described Alan Partridge as a national treasure and a cherished part of British comedy, alongside characters such as Basil Fawlty and Mr. Bean". According to Variety, in Britain "Alan Partridge is a full-on phenomenon, a multiplatform fictional celebrity whose catchphrases, mangled metaphors and social ineptitude are the stuff of legend and good ratings". Though Partridge is less known outside Britain, Adam McKay, the director of the 2004 comedy Anchorman, said he is well known among American comedians including Ben Stiller, Will Ferrell and Jack Black: "Everyone watching those [Partridge] DVDs had the same reaction. How did I not know about this guy?" IndieWire wrote that "before there was Ron Burgundy for the Yanks, there was Alan Partridge for the Brits".

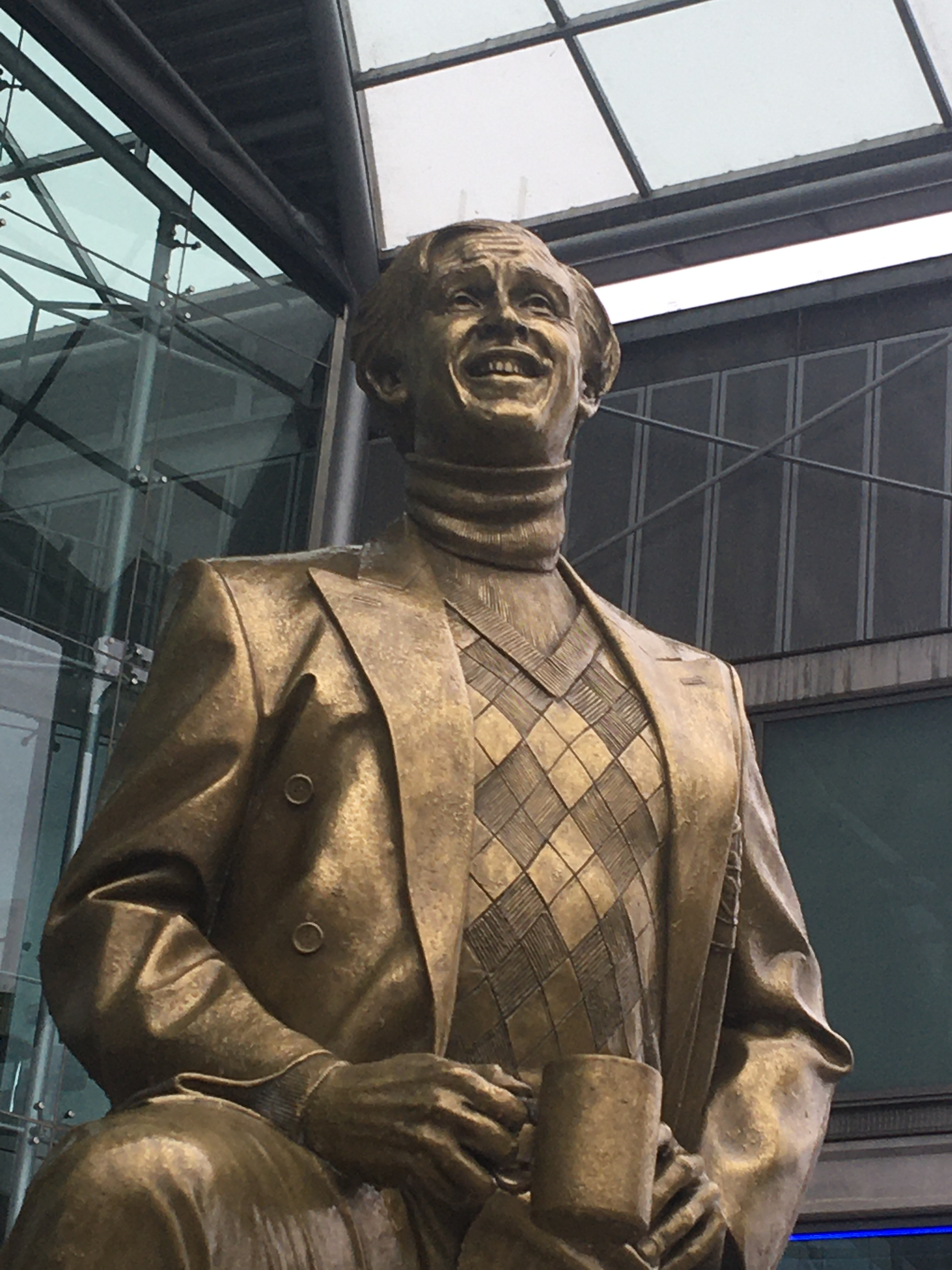
Statue outside the Forum, Norwich

Brian Logan wrote in the Guardian that though Partridge was created as a satire of the "asinine fluency of broadcaster-speak" of the time, his development as a character study gave him a timeless quality. Another Guardian journalist, John Crace, wrote: "By rights, Alan Partridge should have been dead as a character years ago, the last drops of humour long since wrung out ... but Steve Coogan keeps finding ways to make him feel fresh." The Independent wrote that Partridge was a "disarming creation" whom the audience root for despite his flaws.

In the Guardian, Alexis Petridis wrote that audiences find Partridge funny partly because they recognise themselves in him. Another Guardian writer, Edmund Gordon, said Partridge allows progressive audiences to laugh at politically incorrect humour as "every loathsome comment is sold to us not as a gag, but as a gaffe". Gordon called him "a magnificent comic creation: a monster of egotism and tastelessness". Writing that Partridge "channels the worst excesses of the privileged white man who considers himself nonetheless a victim", the New Statesman journalist Daniel Curtis saw Partridge as a precursor to post-truth politicians such as Nigel Farage and Donald Trump.

Mandatory wrote that Partridge was "a fascinatingly layered and fully realised creation of years of storytelling and a fundamentally contemptible prick—he feels like a living, breathing person, but a living, breathing person that you want to strangle". The Telegraph wrote: "Never has one actor so completely inhabited a sitcom character. We believe Partridge is real, from his side-parted hair down to his tasseled sports-casual loafers." In 2025, the Guardian critic Rachel Aroesti wrote that Partridge "has long been an exquisite study in dwindling celebrity", with later series parodying endeavours such as podcasts, crowdfunding and personalised video messages. Aroesti wrote: "Often, fame seems effortless and aspirational – a product of the audience's desire rather than the celebrity's – yet Partridge's interactions with the public remind us that most pursue it, feverishly." In 2014, the Guardian writer Stuart Heritage described Partridge as "one of the greatest and most beloved comic creations of the last few decades". In 2022, another Guardian writer, Michael Hogan, chose Partridge as Coogan's greatest TV role, writing that he had "painstakingly fleshed him out from a catchphrase-spouting caricature to a layered creation of subtle pathos [and] one of our most enduring and beloved comic characters".

The Independent credited Partridge with influencing cringe comedies such as The Inbetweeners, Nighty Night and Peep Show. According to Den of Geek in 2013, "Partridgisms" have become everyday vernacular in British culture. Monkey Tennis, one of Partridge's desperate television proposals, has become shorthand for absurd television concepts. Another, Youth Hostelling with Chris Eubank, was used by the hostel booking site Hostelworld as the basis of a 2015 television advert with the boxer Chris Eubank. In 2020, Coogan said that many of Partridge's inane ideas had since become real programmes, making satire more difficult.

Partridge has become associated with the city of Norwich. An art exhibition inspired by Partridge opened in Norwich in July 2015. In September 2020, an unofficial statue of Partridge created by sculptors in the film industry was temporarily erected outside the Forum in Norwich. Partridge's official Twitter account released a statement endorsing it. In October 2021, a fan convention at the Mercure Norwich Hotel was attended by more than 250 people. Accidental Partridge, an unofficial Twitter account which collects quotes reminiscent of Partridge's speech from real media figures, had attracted 144,000 followers by May 2014. In August 2024, Lynn Faces, a play inspired by Partridge's assistant, Lynn, opened at the New Diorama Theatre in London.

=== Accolades ===
In a 2001 poll by Channel 4, Partridge was voted seventh in their list of the 100 Greatest TV Characters. In a 2017 poll of over 100 comedians, Partridge was voted best TV comedy character and Coogan best male comedy actor, and a scene from I'm Alan Partridge in which Partridge goes to the home of an obsessive fan was voted best comedy scene. In 2021, Rolling Stone named I'm Alan Partridge the 52nd-greatest sitcom, writing that it had taken Partridge "from a parody of celebrity-presenter smarm to one of the greatest Britcom characters ever". In 2024, the Guardian named Knowing Me, Knowing Yule one of the greatest Christmas TV specials.

== Appearances ==
Year	Title	Format	Role
1991–92	On the Hour	Radio series (BBC Radio 4)	Sports correspondent
1992–93	Knowing Me Knowing You with Alan Partridge	Radio series (BBC Radio 4)	Host
1994	The Day Today	TV series (BBC Two)	Sports correspondent
1994	Knowing Me Knowing You with Alan Partridge	TV series (BBC Two)	Host
1994	Christmas Night with the Stars	TV special	Segment host
1995	Knowing Me Knowing Yule with Alan Partridge	TV special (BBC Two)	Host
1995	Alan Partridge's Country Ramble	TV special (BBC Two)	Host
1997, 2002	I'm Alan Partridge	TV series (BBC Two)	Protagonist
1997	Election Night Armistice	TV special (BBC Two)	Interview correspondent
2003	Anglian Lives: Alan Partridge	TV interview special (BBC Two)	Interviewee
2004	Teenage Cancer Trust concert	Charity concert	Presenter
2011, 2016	Mid Morning Matters with Alan Partridge	TV series (Sky Atlantic)	Presenter
2012	Open Books with Martin Bryce	TV talk show (Sky Atlantic)	Interviewee
2012	Alan Partridge: Welcome to the Places of My Life	TV special (Sky Atlantic)	Presenter
2013	Alan Partridge: Alpha Papa	Feature film	Protagonist
2015	TFI Friday	Talk show (Channel 4)	Co-host
2016	Alan Partridge's Scissored Isle	TV special (Sky Atlantic)	Presenter
2017	Alan Partridge: Why, When, Where, How and Whom?	Documentary (BBC Two)	Subject
2019, 2021	This Time with Alan Partridge	TV series (BBC One)	Co-host
2020–ongoing	From the Oasthouse: The Alan Partridge Podcast	Podcast (Audible)	Host
2022	Alan Partridge Live: Stratagem	Live tour	Host
2025	How Are You? It's Alan (Partridge)	TV series (BBC One)	Host

=== Guest appearances ===
Year	Title	Format	Role
1997	Clive Anderson: All Talk	TV talk show	Interviewee
1998	Brit Awards	TV awards show (ITV)	Presenter of "Best British Video" award
2000	British Comedy Awards	TV awards show (ITV)	Musical performer
2011	The Jonathan Ross Show	TV talk show (ITV)	Interviewee
2011	The Richard Bacon Show	Radio talk show (BBC Radio 5 Live)	Interviewee
2017	Inheritance Tracks	Radio series (BBC Radio 4)	Guest
2022	Ant & Dec's Saturday Night Takeaway	TV variety show (ITV)	Guest announcer (series 18, episode 6)
2022	Music of the Spheres World Tour	Live music concert	Special guest segment at one of the London Wembley shows

=== Books ===
Year	Title	Format	Role
2011	I, Partridge: We Need to Talk About Alan	Autobiography	Author
2016	Alan Partridge: Nomad	Autobiography	Author
2023	Big Beacon	Autobiography	Author

=== Fundraising ===
Year	Title	Format	Role
1995	Comic Relief	TV fundraiser (BBC Two)	Fundraising presenter
1995	The Big Snog	TV fundraiser (Channel 4)	Fundraising presenter
1998	Stephen Fry's "Live from the Lighthouse"	TV fundraiser (Channel 4)	Interview correspondent
1999	Comic Relief	TV fundraiser (BBC One)	Presenter
2001	Comic Relief	TV fundraiser (BBC Two)	Interview correspondent
2005	Comic Relief	TV fundraiser (BBC Two)	Host
2011	Comic Relief	TV fundraiser (BBC Two)	Host of Mid Morning Matters segment
2016	Sport Relief	TV fundraiser (BBC One)	Correspondent
2017	Comic Relief	TV fundraiser (BBC One)	Segment voiceover
2019	Comic Relief	TV fundraiser (BBC One)	Correspondent
2024	Comic Relief	TV fundraiser (BBC One)	Host of Mid Morning Matters segment

=== DVDs ===
Year	Title	Format	Role
1998	Steve Coogan Live: The Man Who Thinks He's It	DVD special	Presenter
2009	Steve Coogan Live: As Alan Partridge and Other Less Successful Characters	DVD special	Presenter
