= Mid Morning Matters with Alan Partridge =

British TV and web comedy series

- Genre: Comedy
- Created by: Steve Coogan; Neil Gibbons Rob Gibbons; Armando Iannucci
- Written by: Steve Coogan; Neil Gibbons; Rob Gibbons; Armando Iannucci
- Directed by: Ted Dowd
- Starring: Steve Coogan; Tim Key; Pippa Duffy
- Opening theme: "Georgia" by OMD (series 2)
- Country of origin: United Kingdom
- Original language: English
- No. of series: 2
- No. of episodes: 12 (Series 1 online); 6 (Series 1 Sky); 6 (Series 2)

Production
- Executive producers: Steve Coogan; Henry Normal; Jon Mountague
- Producer: Armando Iannucci
- Running time: 15 minutes (web version); 30 minutes (TV version)
- Production company: Baby Cow Productions

Original release
- Network: YouTube (web version); Sky Atlantic (TV version)
- Release: 5 November 2010 – 22 March 2016

Related
- I'm Alan Partridge; Alan Partridge: Welcome to the Places of My Life

Mid Morning Matters with Alan Partridge is a British television sitcom written by Steve Coogan, Neil Gibbons, Rob Gibbons and Armando Iannucci, produced by Baby Cow Productions. Parodying a British digital radio show, it stars Coogan as the fictional radio DJ Alan Partridge.

The first of twelve 15-minute episodes was uploaded to the Foster's Funny website on 5 November 2010, and then available on YouTube. Six 30-minute episodes titled Alan Partridge Mid Morning Matters: Special Edition, edited from the web series, began airing on Sky Atlantic in July 2012 as part of a deal between producers Baby Cow and BSkyB. A second series consisting of six episodes premiered in February 2016.

== Plot ==
The show is shot from the perspective of a webcam in the studio of fictional station North Norfolk Digital. Alan Partridge (Steve Coogan) is back working as a disc jockey, after the failure of his television career. He is usually joined by 'Sidekick Simon' (Tim Key) who eventually leaves or is fired due to Alan's gradual dislike towards him. Alan is noticeably annoyed when he discovers that Simon has started guesting as a sidekick on another radio show (Bedtime with Branning). After Simon's departure, Alan recruits a new sidekick, Zoe (Pippa Duffy), and quickly develops a crush on her. In the final part of series one, Zoe reveals she is going travelling for three months, much to Alan's disappointment. Simon returns in series 2.

== Production and TV airing ==
In August 2010, it was reported that Alan Partridge would make a comeback series online for lager company Foster's. On 8 October 2010, it was announced that the new show, entitled Alan Partridge's Mid Morning Matters, would premiere on 5 November 2010 on Foster's comedy site, fostersfunny.co.uk. In a press release, Steve Coogan announced, in character:

"I am delighted to announce that after years as a regional broadcaster on North Norfolk Digital my groundbreaking radio segment, Mid Morning Matters, will now be accessible to a potential audience of billions via the World Wide Web (www).

That it has taken Foster's to help realise my dream of joining the information superhighway is a damning indictment of the established broadcasters whose shabby treatment of me on Sept 10th 2001 was frankly shabby. I made dozens of calls the next day, all of which were ignored.

My appreciation must go to Armando Iannucci and Baby Cow for ignoring the lies, God bless them. In the meantime I look forward to 'hanging out 'n' chillin' with the MySpace generation."

The first six episodes aired online in December 2010, with the remainder released weekly from 4 February 2011 until episode 12 on 11 March 2011. Following the series, Alan appeared again as part of the Red Nose Day 2011 set for a one-off show akin to the Mid Morning Matters arrangement, and here Sidekick Simon reappears in his former capacity.

Following a deal between Baby Cow Productions and BSkyB in November 2011, the first series was broadcast as six 30-minute episodes on Sky Atlantic, despite the public antipathy of Steve Coogan towards media mogul Rupert Murdoch and his former company 21st Century Fox, who at the time owned a controlling 33% of BSkyB, following the News International phone-hacking scandal. Series two of Mid Morning Matters began airing on Sky Atlantic on 16 February 2016. As with the first series on Sky, series two ran for six 30-minute episodes.

== Reception ==
The Telegraph called the show "endlessly creative".

== Episodes ==
=== Series 1 2010/11 ===
No. overall	No. in series	Title	Original release date
1	1	"Focus on Cycling"	5 November 2010
Alan attempts to cycle 10 miles in 30 minutes on an exercise bike.
2	2	"Who Does Alan Think Alan Is?"	12 November 2010
Alan digs into his ancestry and is upset by the results.
3	3	"Simply the Best of Norfolk"	19 November 2010
The team have a phone-in asking 'what is the best 'thing'?'.
4	4	"Wine"	26 November 2010
Alan reviews a selection of wine, one of which tastes of Chewits.
5	5	"Alan's Sad Story"	3 December 2010
Alan is set up by a rival station and later has to ad-lib a ludicrous story after spilling food on the original that was submitted by a listener.
6	6	"King and Car"	10 December 2010
The team host a phone-in where guests are asked to name what car famous historical characters would drive.
7	7	"Partridge on Partridge"	4 February 2011
Things turn rather sour between Alan and Sidekick Simon after the latter reveals he did some work with another DJ and Alan interviews himself in a typical self-grandiose way.
8	8	"North Norfolk Today with Eddie Shepherd and Terri Cohen"	11 February 2011
Alan fills in for an ill colleague on a current affairs show.
9	9	"Tora Bora Alan"	18 February 2011
An ex-soldier is a guest on the show and explains how he would deal with radicalised RSPB members in the Wookey Hole caves at Alan's suggestion.
10	10	"Alan Partridge: Out of the Box Thinker"	25 February 2011
Alan interviews an internet millionaire and sacks Simon after the latter's prank backfires.
11	11	"Agony Alan"	4 March 2011
Zoe joins the team in place of Simon and Alan is immediately attracted to her.
12	12	"The Man with the Child in His Eyes"	11 March 2011
Alan continues to try to flirt with Zoe whilst championing Kate Bush.

=== Series 2 (2016) ===
No. overall	No. in series	Title	Original release date
13	1	"Foxhunter + Radio Play"	16 February 2016
14	2	"Book Club + Dave Clifton"	23 February 2016
15	3	"Blackbird + Gangster"	1 March 2016
16	4	"Jasper + Chef"	8 March 2016
17	5	"Massage + Royal Visit"	15 March 2016
18	6	"Grundy + Snow"	22 March 2016

== Home media ==
The first series of Mid Morning Matters was released on DVD first, in Australia on 1 March 2012 by 2entertain. It was released on 12 November 2012 in the UK, also by 2entertain. The second series was released on DVD in April 2016.
