= Alan Partridge: Welcome to the Places of My Life =

UK television programme

- Genre: Comedy
- Written by: Steve Coogan; Neil Gibbons; Rob Gibbons
- Directed by: David Lambert
- Starring: Steve Coogan; Dolly Wells; Graham Duff; Harmage Singh Kalirai; Robert Demeger
- Country of origin: United Kingdom
- Original language: English
- No. of episodes: 1

Production
- Executive producers: Steve Coogan; Armando Iannucci; Lucy Lumsden; Henry Normal
- Producer: David Lambert
- Running time: 45 minutes approx.
- Production company: Baby Cow Productions

Original release
- Network: Sky Atlantic
- Release: 25 June 2012

Related
- The Thick of It; In the Loop

Alan Partridge: Welcome to the Places of My Life is one of two one-off Alan Partridge specials commissioned by Sky Atlantic and produced by Baby Cow Productions. It was broadcast on 25 June 2012 and received a BAFTA for Steve Coogan's performance.

== Premise ==
Alan Partridge (Coogan) takes his viewers on a tour of his beloved home county of Norfolk. He visits various local landmarks, as well as some of his favourite places and also shows parts of his day-to-day life.

Partridge begins his program by noting that Norfolk has also been known as "East Anglia, the plump peninsula, home of The Broads — although that sounds like a refuge for fallen prostitutes — Albion's hindquarters, or quite simply, the Wales of the East."

Although the episode starts off as a local travelogue, events gradually take a darker turn as Partridge's personal life begins to intrude, as it is hinted that he is facing a potential diagnosis of a terminal illness. This prompts a period of reflection and soul-searching on Partridge's part.

== Reception ==
The new specials were highly anticipated and Welcome to the Places of My Life was generally well received. Ben Lawrence, writing for The Daily Telegraph, gave the episode 3½ stars out of a possible 5, said "Egotistical, bombastic, bigoted, insecure, lonely, needy. Partridge remains a brilliant, monstrous, pathetic creation who can still raise a smile in his audience. If Partridge was once merely a figure of fun, he is now a character of true pathos." Tim Glanfield of RadioTimes wrote, "Sky Atlantic delivers the best Alan Partridge of the 21st Century. Welcome to the Places of my Life is well observed, carefully constructed and very, very funny." Alex Fletcher said, writing for Digital Spy's Tube Talk, that "Welcome to the Places of My Life is up there with the funniest work of Coogan's career. A one-hour 'documentary' following Alan acting as a tour guide around his favourite destinations (Thetford Forest) and daily stop-offs (his local newsagent), the show is rich enough and hilarious enough to make you long for a full series."

John Crace of The Guardian wrote that "the set-up was a parody of any number of early evening TV documentaries in which a minor celebrity fills an hour of screen time by pottering around some fairly dull places, talking to fairly dull people while trying to convince everyone it's all enormously interesting. On its own, this would have made good comedy, as there were also sideswipes at Bear Grylls' and Dan Snow's annoying presentational tics of adding drama to the tediously mundane. But with Partridge it's always what you don't expect that makes him so well worth watching." Jack Sharp, writing for On the Box, gave the episode 5 stars out of a possible 5 and said that it was "an essential hour of comedy for Partridge fans, packed full of very quotable Partridgisms."

== Information ==
The programme was directed by David Lambert, and written by Steve Coogan, Neil Gibbons and Rob Gibbons. It was watched by an estimated 216,000 people.
