= Knowing Me Knowing You with Alan Partridge (TV series) =

British TV comedy series (1994–1995)

- Titlescreen
- Genre: Comedy (spoof chat show)
- Created by: Steve Coogan; Armando Iannucci; Patrick Marber
- Directed by: Dominic Brigstocke
- Starring: Steve Coogan; Steve Brown; Rebecca Front; Patrick Marber; David Schneider; Doon Mackichan
- Theme music composer: ABBA
- Opening theme: "Knowing Me, Knowing You" by the Steve Brown Band
- Country of origin: United Kingdom
- Original language: English
- No. of episodes: 7 (inc. Christmas special)

Production
- Executive producer: Peter Fincham
- Producer: Armando Iannucci
- Running time: 28–32 min 46 min (Christmas Special)
- Production company: Talkback Productions

Original release
- Network: BBC2
- Release: 16 September 1994 – 29 December 1995

Related
- Knowing Me Knowing You with Alan Partridge (Radio series); I'm Alan Partridge

Knowing Me, Knowing You with Alan Partridge (also known as Knowing Me, Knowing You) is a BBC Television comedy series of six episodes (beginning 16 September 1994), and a Christmas special Knowing Me, Knowing Yule on 29 December 1995. It is named after the song "Knowing Me, Knowing You" by ABBA (the main character's favourite band), a rendition of which was used as the show's title music. Steve Coogan plays the incompetent but self-satisfied Norwich-based talk show host Alan Partridge, who often insults his guests and humiliates himself in the process. Alan was a spin-off character from the spoof radio show On the Hour (which later transferred to TV as The Day Today). Knowing Me, Knowing You was written by Coogan, Armando Iannucci (who produced the radio version) and Patrick Marber (who also starred), with contributions from the regular supporting cast of Doon Mackichan, Rebecca Front and David Schneider, who played Alan's weekly guests. Steve Brown provided the show's music and arrangements, and also appeared as Glenn Ponder, the man in charge of the house band (the name of which changed, without explanation, every episode).

Alan went on to appear in two series of the sitcom I'm Alan Partridge, following his life after both his marriage and TV career come to an end, though the latter was subsequently revived. It was generally well received by fans and critics, and was nominated for a BAFTA and a British Comedy Award.

== Format ==
In December 1992, BBC Radio 4 began broadcasting a six-episode spoof chat show, Knowing Me, Knowing You with Alan Partridge. The series saw Partridge irritate and offend his guests, and coined his catchphrase, "Aha!". In 1994, Knowing Me, Knowing You transferred to television. The series ends with Partridge accidentally shooting a guest. A Christmas special, Knowing Me, Knowing Yule, followed in December 1995, in which Partridge attacks a BBC commissioning editor, ending his television career.

== Reception ==
Knowing Me, Knowing You was nominated for the 1995 BAFTA for Light Entertainment Performance. The Austin Chronicle called it "one of the most hilarious satirical comedies in recent memory". In 2024, the Guardian named Knowing Me, Knowing Yule one of the greatest Christmas TV specials.

== Episodes ==
	Transmission date	House band	Rebecca Front	Patrick Marber	David Schneider	Doon Mackichan	Other guests	Another Alan
1	16 September 1994	Glenn Ponder and Chalet	Sue Lewis, a quiet showjumper	Keith Hunt, new host of This Is Your Life	Big Red Book on This Is Your Life (untransmitted sequence)	Shona McGough, an abrasive punk singer	Keith's son, Shona's band and Roger Moore (voice; performed by Steve Coogan)	-
2	23 September 1994	Glenn Ponder and Debonair	Tania Beaumont, actress	Gary Barker, washed-up actor and Tania's husband	Tony Le Mesmer, magician and hypnotist	-	Daniella Forrest, transgender Playboy columnist (Minnie Driver)	A sailor with a facial tic (John Thomson)
3	30 September 1994	Glenn Ponder and Ferrari	Gina Langland, singer	Lawrence Knowles, a sleazy promoter	Clive Sealy, Lawrence's dermatologist	-	The Olympic Golden Girls of 1936; Hot Pants, an all-male strip troupe	-
4	7 October 1994	Glenn Ponder and Savoir Faire	Yvonne Boyd, a fashion designer with odd ideas	Philippe Lambert, famous but arrogant French chef	Head of Cirque des Clowns, a very risqué mime act	-	Nina Vanier, Alan's French co-host (Melanie Hudson)	Alain Perdrix, a lorry driver who couldn't speak English
5	14 October 1994	Glenn Ponder and Lazarus	Charlotte Fraser (Lab)	Martin Dwyer, alias Lt. Col. Kojak Slaphead III (Bald Brummies Against The Big-Footed Conspiracy Party)	Adrian Finch (Con)	-	Terry Norton, dodgy boxing promoter (Alan Ford); Five Miss Norwich contestants (Barbara Durkin, plus four uncredited); Ronald Biggs (Lib Dem) (Felix Dexter)	Dead, but appeared in a coffin with his family
6	21 October 1994	Glenn Ponder and Bangkok	Bridie McMahon, lesbian host of the show to take Alan's place	Forbes McAllister, cynical restaurant critic for The Spectator	Unnamed Police Sergeant	Wanda Harvey, Bridie's lesbian co-host	The Alan Partridge Playmates; the Maclean brothers, irritating child film-makers; Joe Beazley and Cheeky Monkey, awful ventriloquist act (John Thomson)	-
7	29 December 1995	Glenn Ponder and his "friend" Andy	Mary, a bellringer and devout Christian	Gordon Heron, a paralysed former golfer	Tony Hayers, Chief Commissioning Editor of BBC Television	Liz Heron, Gordon's wife and also a golfer	Fanny Thomas, innuendo-using drag act (Kevin Eldon), Mick Hucknall	-

=== Characters carried over into the TV series ===
Several characters from the radio series are similar to ones used in the TV series; several jokes are even reused. Doon MacKichan's character Kendall Ball did not make it into the eventual TV series but did appear in The Day Today, made between the two incarnations.

Radio	TV
Tony Hayers	Tony Hayers
Sally Hoff	Tania Beaumont
Conrad Knight	Gary Barker
Lord Morgan of Glossop	Forbes McAllister
Yvonne Boyd	Yvonne Boyd
Janey Katz	Tony LeMesmer
Michel Lambert	Philippe Lambert
