= I'm Alan Partridge =

British sitcom (1997–2002)

- Title screen from series 1 (1997)
- Genre: Sitcom; Cringe comedy
- Created by: Peter Baynham; Steve Coogan; Armando Iannucci
- Written by: Peter Baynham; Steve Coogan; Armando Iannucci
- Directed by: Dominic Brigstocke; Armando Iannucci
- Starring: Steve Coogan; Felicity Montagu
- Country of origin: United Kingdom
- Original language: English
- No. of series: 2
- No. of episodes: 12

Production
- Executive producer: Peter Fincham
- Camera setup: Multi-camera
- Running time: 29 minutes
- Production company: Talkback

Original release
- Network: BBC Two
- Release: 3 November 1997 – 16 December 2002

Related
- Knowing Me Knowing You with Alan Partridge; Mid Morning Matters with Alan Partridge; The Day Today; How Are You? It's Alan (Partridge)

I'm Alan Partridge is a British sitcom created by Steve Coogan, Peter Baynham and Armando Iannucci. Coogan stars as Alan Partridge, a tactless and inept broadcaster. The first series, broadcast in 1997, has Partridge living in a roadside hotel after having been left by his wife and dropped by the BBC. The second, broadcast in 2002, sees Partridge living in a static caravan after recovering from a mental breakdown. Iannucci said the writers used the sitcom as "a kind of social X-ray of male middle-aged Middle England".

The supporting cast includes Felicity Montagu as his faithful but timid personal assistant, Lynn Benfield; Simon Greenall as Geordie handyman Michael; and Phil Cornwell as Partridge's rival DJ Dave Clifton. Series 2 also featured Amelia Bullmore as Alan's Ukrainian girlfriend Sonja. The show received critical acclaim and was a success amongst audiences, being nominated for three BAFTAs (winning two), two British Comedy Awards (winning both), and a Royal Television Society award. In a list drawn up by the British Film Institute in 2000, voted by industry professionals, I'm Alan Partridge was named the 38th-best British television series of all time. It has been cited as one of the greatest television programmes of all time.

== Premise ==
Alan Partridge was created by Steve Coogan and producer Armando Iannucci for the 1991 BBC Radio 4 comedy programme On the Hour, a spoof of British current affairs broadcasting, in which Partridge served as the show's sports presenter. The character was presented as an overly confident, self-important and socially awkward broadcaster, whose attempts to project the image of a successful media personality were frequently undermined by his lack of judgement and poor interpersonal skills. In 1992, Partridge hosted a spin-off Radio 4 spoof chat show, Knowing Me, Knowing You with Alan Partridge. The programme developed the character beyond his original role as a sports presenter, establishing many of the characteristics and comic themes that would later become central to the television series.

On the Hour transferred to television as The Day Today in 1994, followed by Knowing Me, Knowing You later that year. The series ends with Partridge accidentally shooting a guest. This marked an early example of the character's tendency to respond to increasingly chaotic situations with a mixture of misplaced confidence, panic and poor decision-making, traits that would continue to define his subsequent appearances.

I'm Alan Partridge follows Partridge after he has been left by his wife and dropped from the BBC. The series explores the consequences of his professional and personal decline, while retaining his belief that he remains a major figure in British broadcasting. In the first series, he lives in a roadside hotel, presents a graveyard slot on local Norwich radio, and desperately pitches ideas for new television shows. His attempts to rebuild his career are repeatedly frustrated by his own behaviour, as he struggles to understand why his colleagues, potential employers and audiences no longer regard him as the important television personality he believes himself to be. The series also places Partridge in a series of increasingly uncomfortable encounters with members of the public and people working in the media, allowing the character's self-importance and lack of social awareness to become the main source of the comedy.

In the second series (2002), Partridge lives in a static caravan with his new Ukrainian girlfriend (Amelia Bullmore) after recovering from a mental breakdown. By then he has moved to the late night "Norfolk Nights" slot and also hosts Skirmish, a military-based general knowledge quiz show on digital cable channel UK Conquest, which Partridge says has "the largest audience share for a digital channel at that time of day in the Norfolk area". Although Partridge's circumstances have improved in some respects, his underlying insecurity and desire for recognition remain. His continued attempts to present himself as a successful and respected broadcaster contrast with the modest scale of his career, creating much of the tension between his own perception of himself and the reality of his situation.

The series uses Partridge's career setbacks and personal difficulties to satirise aspects of British broadcasting and celebrity culture. His obsession with ratings, audience figures and professional status is repeatedly contrasted with his inability to recognise how other people perceive him. The character's attempts to maintain control over his public image often result in further embarrassment, particularly when his attempts at sophistication or authority expose his ignorance, vanity or lack of tact. This approach allows the series to combine character comedy with observations about the television industry, regional broadcasting and the ambitions of media personalities seeking to remain relevant.

Iannucci said that while researching the first series at a motorway service station hotel with Coogan and Patrick Marber, they found that there was "some depth to this situation – a kind of social X-ray of male middle-aged Middle England". The setting and circumstances of the series were therefore intended to reflect more than Partridge's individual misfortunes, with the character representing a particular type of middle-aged man whose sense of status and identity has been damaged by professional and personal failure. The writers used Partridge's situation to explore themes of insecurity, social status and the desire for recognition, while maintaining the exaggerated style of British sitcom and satire.

The writers found the second series difficult to make, feeling it had been too long since the first and that expectations for sitcoms had changed. The second series consequently developed the character further rather than simply repeating the premise of the first. Partridge is no longer attempting to recover immediately from the collapse of his career, but has instead established a new, comparatively low-profile life in which he continues to regard himself as a significant broadcaster. His work on local radio and Skirmish provides opportunities for the series to examine his continuing ambitions, while his personal circumstances expose the gap between the life he has and the life he believes he deserves.

== Characters ==
Character	Actor	Series	Notes
Alan Partridge	Steve Coogan	1 and 2	The central character, a tactless and inept broadcaster
Lynn Benfield	Felicity Montagu	1 and 2	Alan's long suffering personal assistant
Michael	Simon Greenall	1 and 2	The hotel's Geordie handyman
Dave Clifton	Phil Cornwell	1 and 2	Alan's former colleague and rival DJ
Susan	Barbara Durkin	1	Reception manager at the Linton Travel Tavern
Sophie	Sally Phillips	1	Receptionist at the Linton Travel Tavern
Ben	James Lance	1	Staff member at the Linton Travel Tavern
Jill	Julia Deakin	1	Had a one night stand with Alan
Sonja	Amelia Bullmore	2	Alan's Ukrainian girlfriend
Tony Hayers	David Schneider	1	BBC executive who has considerable influence over Alan's career
Builder	Tim Dantay	2	One of the builders working on Alan's new house
Frank Raphael	Andrew Burt	1 and 2	Voice of Radio Norwich

The cast and character assignments are based primarily on the BFI cast listing and the episode-level cast information.

== Episodes ==
=== Series 1 (1997) ===
No.	Title	Directed by	Written by	Original release date
1	"A Room with an Alan"	Dominic Brigstocke	Peter Baynham, Steve Coogan & Armando Iannucci	3 November 1997
Alan Partridge is living at the Linton Travel Tavern after separating from his wife, and is hosting the graveyard slot on Radio Norwich after a poorly received first series of his BBC talk show. The staff at the hotel remain cordial to Alan despite his intolerable personality. Believing he is set for a second series at the BBC, Alan goes house hunting, accompanied by his loyal personal assistant Lynn. During an embarrassing lunch at BBC Television Centre with Tony Hayers (David Schneider), the chief programme commissioner of the BBC, Hayers informs Alan that he will not get a second series and dismisses a number of Alan's increasingly desperate alternate pitches for new shows, including "Inner City Sumo" and "Monkey Tennis". Alan flees after assaulting Hayers with a wheel of blue cheese. With no second series, and therefore no funds to purchase his house, Alan returns to his hotel room.
2	"Alan Attraction"	Dominic Brigstocke	Peter Baynham, Steve Coogan & Armando Iannucci	10 November 1997
Without a second series of his programme, Alan is nearing bankruptcy and has to put his production company into liquidation and sack his staff. Alan panics on arrival at Peartree Productions and falsely tells them that he has been successful in securing a second series. While the staff prepare a party, and Jill, his flirtatious, chain-smoking, 50-year-old, divorced receptionist (Julia Deakin) goes out to buy some snacks, Alan tries to extricate himself by sacking his staff members for various ridiculous "offences". While he locks himself in his boardroom, all the staff leave voluntarily, except for Jill, who returns and goes on a date with Alan to a nearby owl sanctuary. In the evening, the two attend a Valentine's Day dinner at the Travel Tavern and return to Alan's room to have sex. Jill's attempt at eroticism (involving smearing chocolate mousse all over Alan) angers him, causing him to end the liaison and later announce on his radio show that he has sacked her.
3	"Watership Alan"	Dominic Brigstocke	Peter Baynham, Steve Coogan & Armando Iannucci	17 November 1997
After making disparaging comments about farming on his radio show, Alan has become an object of hatred for local farmers. After being hired to shoot an advertisement for a small boating holiday company, Alan attempts to contact his ex-wife Carol in order to meet the company's requirement that he have a partner in the video with him, but is unsuccessful. On the day of the video shoot, he attempts to fit in with the hard-drinking crew, while making a fool of himself in front of the actress they had to hire to replace his ex-wife. Between shooting days, Alan interviews the leader of the local Farmers' Union (Chris Morris), but instead of apologising for his comments, his series of increasingly ludicrous claims involving their livelihoods enrages local farmers even further. During the second day of the shoot, Alan is crushed by a dead cow thrown from a bridge by disgruntled farmers. He returns from hospital with a neck brace and broken fingers, asking the hotel staff to "make pornography come on my television again" after previously requesting they disable the channel.
4	"Basic Alan"	Dominic Brigstocke	Peter Baynham, Steve Coogan & Armando Iannucci	24 November 1997
Major refurbishments are taking place at the Linton Travel Tavern, leaving Alan as the only guest. He becomes desperately bored and does various things to pass the time, including dismantling his trouser press, walking along a busy dual carriageway to a petrol station to buy several bottles of windscreen washer fluid, driving round the ring road three times, buying some tungsten-tipped screws he never intends to use and dressing up as a zombie as a practical joke. His boredom culminates with an attempt to steal a traffic cone with Michael and Lynn, before they are stopped by the police.
5	"To Kill a Mocking Alan"	Dominic Brigstocke	Peter Baynham, Steve Coogan & Armando Iannucci	1 December 1997
Alan hosts "An Afternoon with Alan Partridge" at the hotel which is attended by his self-confessed "biggest fan", Jed Maxwell (Ian Sharrock). He is also visited by Irish network executives (Graham Linehan and Arthur Mathews) who are considering giving him a show on Irish television. They are offended by Alan, particularly regarding his ignorant views on Ireland and the Troubles, and his misunderstanding of the U2 song "Sunday Bloody Sunday", though they get along well with Lynn. Through a series of mishaps, Alan and the executives end up at Jed's house, whom Alan pretends to cohabit with due to having no home of his own. After they discover that Jed's fandom is of a highly obsessive nature, with one of his rooms acting as shrine to the presenter, the two executives make their excuses and leave, leaving Alan and Jed alone. Alan becomes increasingly worried about his own safety and, following an altercation with Jed, he makes a hasty escape by fleeing across nearby fields.
6	"Towering Alan"	Dominic Brigstocke	Peter Baynham, Steve Coogan & Armando Iannucci	8 December 1997
After an afternoon hosting a small village fayre and judging the vegetable competition, Alan is delighted to discover that Tony Hayers has died and that his successor is Chris Feather, a supporter of Alan's works. Attending Hayers' funeral as he knows Chris will be there, he attempts to secure his sought-after second series. However, Feather suffers a fatal heart attack just before Alan's new contract is signed. Later, Alan and Lynn host a farewell party in his hotel room, where manager Susan finally lashes out at Alan in retaliation for his behaviour throughout his protracted occupancy. The guests all leave as a result. The series ends as Alan and Lynn tidy up to the theme from The Adventures of Black Beauty, with Alan feeling pleased with himself.

=== Series 2 (2002) ===
No.	Title	Directed by	Written by	Original release date	Viewers (millions)
7	"The Talented Mr Alan"	Armando Iannucci	Armando Iannucci, Steve Coogan & Peter Baynham	11 November 2002	3.71
Five years on from his time at the Linton Travel Tavern, Alan is living in a static home next to his under-construction house, with his new girlfriend Sonja. He has written a book, Bouncing Back, having spent the previous two years unemployed and "clinically fed up". While visiting Michael at his new petrol station job, Alan has a chance meeting with his old teacher Frank Raphael. Alan convinces Raphael to let him give a talk to the sixth formers at the school where Raphael is now headmaster. Whilst at the school, Alan bumps into an old schoolmate, Phil Wiley, who is now a teacher. Alan still holds a grudge against Wiley for drawing a penis on the back of his school blazer, which Raphael caned Alan for. In his talk, Alan makes a fool of himself by screening his car safety video Crash, Bang, Wallop: What a Video! to the schoolchildren, and exposing Wiley for impregnating the school science lab assistant during his time as a pupil. Later, Wiley comes into the petrol station. Alan, thinking he has come to fight, threatens him with a hot apple pie while Lynn draws a chalk penis on his back. The two make peace, but an arriving customer informs Wiley of the drawing, forcing Alan to lock the petrol station doors, trapping himself, Lynn and Michael inside.
8	"The Colour of Alan"	Armando Iannucci	Armando Iannucci, Steve Coogan & Peter Baynham	18 November 2002	3.75
Alan is asked to present a sales conference for Dante's of Reading, a company that supplies coal-effect fires and fireplaces. The company sends Piet Morant to discuss the conference details with Alan. After his frequent pranks with the security staff at Choristers Country Club result in the police being called, Alan is forced to bring Piet to his partially built house for the meeting, with Lynn and Michael improvising a meeting room from makeshift furniture and lighting. Despite a difficult meeting, Alan is awarded the job. He is denied entry to the conference due to his lack of ID and after attempting to climb the fence, he impales his foot on a metal spike. He refuses to seek medical treatment and attempts to present the sales conference with a seriously injured foot, leading to him vomiting all over the floor.
9	"Brave Alan"	Armando Iannucci	Armando Iannucci, Steve Coogan & Peter Baynham	25 November 2002	3.29
Alan makes a new friend at the BP garage, Dan (Stephen Mangan). They share an appreciation for the same beer, use the same deodorant, and drive the same car. Dan owns Kitchen Planet, a local superstore, and arranges for Alan to both purchase a reduced-price kitchen and present the Norfolk Bravery Awards, sponsored by Colman's Mustard. Alan's attempts to impress Karen Colman are unsuccessful, but she strikes up an instant rapport with Sonja, later inviting her back to her house for a "girls-only night". Lynn goes to spend the evening with Gordon, her new friend from the church, leaving Alan alone. Unsure of what to do with the rest of his day, Alan spends some time at an arcade before enjoying a "cup of beans" on Michael's doorstep. Later, at Dan's house, Alan is promised a demo reel of his prospective kitchen but is instead shown a recording of Dan and his wife Kerry having sex in the superstore. They proposition Alan to join, based on their erotic enjoyment of his "Deep Bath" segment on Radio Norwich. Lynn arrives with kitchen brochures and Alan warns her about the "sex people". They leave, and after hastily performing one final "Deep Bath" on the air, Alan cancels the segment, much to the disappointment of Dan and Kerry.
10	"Never Say Alan Again"	Armando Iannucci	Armando Iannucci, Steve Coogan & Peter Baynham	2 December 2002	3.39
Alan plans to watch all the James Bond films in sequential order for the bank holiday weekend with Michael, who has made a new friend, Tex (Peter Serafinowicz). Tex is obsessed with American culture, and Alan's jealousy of the two causes him to fall out with Michael. It is the first anniversary of Lynn's mother's death, and Alan takes her to visit the grave site. Upon their arrival back to the caravan, Lynn's friend Gordon appears, and threatens Alan over his mistreatment of Lynn. In a panic, Alan gives Lynn a pay rise. Lynn accidentally destroys almost all of Alan's James Bond video collection just before the marathon begins, with the only surviving tape being in Michael's possession. After making up with him, Alan discovers that an episode of America's Strongest Man has been taped over The Spy Who Loved Me. In anger, he restlessly performs the opening sequence to the film. Everybody present elects to watch America's Strongest Man instead, and Alan is left to roleplay James Bond alone.
11	"I Know What Alan Did Last Summer"	Armando Iannucci	Armando Iannucci, Steve Coogan & Peter Baynham	9 December 2002	3.32
The Inland Revenue are due to call and carry out an investigation into Alan's business affairs, causing him to worry about the gift receipt for a dressing gown Bill Oddie gave him that he falsely and illegally declared as a tax expense. Sonja has developed an apparent obsession with London, repeatedly gifting Alan with London-based memorabilia and requesting he take her there on a trip. Alan lies to Sonja about his supposed friendship with Bono, from the band U2. Alone, Alan performs an air bass solo to Gary Numan's "Music for Chameleons". When the Inland Revenue arrive, Alan panics and behaves incredibly suspiciously, before delegating to Lynn once she arrives with a record of his business receipts. After an argument with Sonja about London, Alan attempts to make up with her by taking her to Blickling Hall, a National Trust stately home, under the guise of it being Bono's house. Lynn arrives with a friend of hers from the Baptist church in disguise as "Bono", but Sonja does not fall for the deception, leading Alan to begrudgingly promise her a trip to London, which he yet again delegates to Lynn.
12	"Alan Wide Shut"	Armando Iannucci	Armando Iannucci, Steve Coogan & Peter Baynham	16 December 2002	3.09
The building work on Alan's house is finally complete and Sonja wants to move in. Alan, however, has other ideas, insensitively suggesting she live in the caravan next door, only coming round to please Alan sexually. He is interviewed on the radio show Prayer Wave, where his insensitive comments towards another guest (Julia Davis) concerning her previous drug problems cause her to walk out. Attending Lynn's baptism at her church, he makes a dreadfully uncomfortable speech, simulates blowing his head off with a shotgun and assaults a guest who questions his anecdote-writing abilities. Alan attends the destruction of the remaining 14,000 unsold copies of his book, Bouncing Back, which are due to be pulped. Alan takes a few copies of the book with him as a memento.

== Reception ==
I'm Alan Partridge won the 1998 BAFTA awards for Comedy Performance and Comedy Programme or Series. Digital Spy wrote: "the character of Partridge hit his comic peak" in I'm Alan Partridge. Entertainment Weekly described the show as "bleakly hilarious". The Telegraph named I'm Alan Partridge as one of the 10 best TV sitcoms of all time. In a poll of British comedians conducted by the TV channel Gold, it was named as the second-best British sitcom of all time. In a 2017 poll of over 100 comedians, a scene from I'm Alan Partridge in which Partridge goes to the home of an obsessive fan was voted best comedy scene.

=== Awards and nominations ===
Awards and nominations for I'm Alan Partridge
Year	Award	Category	Recipient	Result
1998	British Academy Television Awards	Best Comedy (Programme or Series)	Armando Iannucci, Dominic Brigstocke, Peter Baynham, Steve Coogan	Won
1998	British Academy Television Awards	Best Comedy Performance	Steve Coogan	Won
1998	British Comedy Awards	Best TV Comedy Actor	Steve Coogan	Won
1998	British Comedy Awards	Best TV Sitcom	I'm Alan Partridge	Won
1998	Royal Television Society Awards	Best Situation Comedy or Comedy Drama	Talkback Productions	Nominated
2003	British Academy Television Awards	Best Comedy Performance	Steve Coogan	Nominated
2003	British Comedy Awards	Best TV Comedy	I'm Alan Partridge	Nominated
2003	British Comedy Awards	Best TV Comedy Actor	Steve Coogan	Won
2003	British Comedy Awards	Best TV Comedy Actress	Felicity Montagu	Nominated
2003	Royal Television Society Awards	Best Comedy Performance	Steve Coogan	Nominated
