= Gibbons brothers =

English screenwriting duo

Neil Gibbons and Rob Gibbons are an English screenwriting duo from Sandbach in Cheshire. The twin brothers are best known for cowriting several Alan Partridge projects, including Mid Morning Matters with Alan Partridge, Alan Partridge: Welcome to the Places of My Life, This Time with Alan Partridge and the 2013 film Alan Partridge: Alpha Papa. They were nominated as best comedy writers in the 2017 British Academy Television Craft Awards for Alan Partridge's Scissored Isle. They also cowrote Bedsitcom and an episode of the fourth season of the HBO comedy series Veep.

The 2022 sitcom The Witchfinder was written by the Gibbons brothers.

The 2026 TV Series The Reluctant Vampire is a Gibbons brothers adaption of a 1982 children's novel of the same name written by Eric and Gary Morecambe.
