= Knowing Me Knowing You with Alan Partridge (radio series) =

- Cover of CD release
- Other names: KMKYWAP
- Running time: 30 minutes
- Country of origin: United Kingdom
- Language: English
- Home station: BBC Radio 4
- Starring: Steve Coogan; Rebecca Front; Patrick Marber; David Schneider; Doon Mackichan
- Written by: Steve Coogan; Patrick Marber
- Produced by: Armando Iannucci
- Original release: 1 December 1992 – 5 January 1993
- No. of series: 1
- No. of episodes: 6
- Audio format: Stereo
- Opening theme: "Knowing Me, Knowing You"

Knowing Me Knowing You with Alan Partridge (also known as Knowing Me Knowing You) is a BBC Radio 4 series of six episodes (beginning 1 December 1992). It is named after the song "Knowing Me, Knowing You" by ABBA (Alan Partridge's favourite band), which was used as the show's title music.

Steve Coogan played the incompetent but self-satisfied Norwich-based host, Alan Partridge. Alan was a spin-off character from the spoof radio show On the Hour (which later transferred to TV as The Day Today). Originally airing at 18:30, Radio Times described the show as: "Classic chat from On the Hour's supreme sports reporter and his guests from the world of theatre, politics and emotional tragedy."

== Episodes ==
	Transmission date	Rebecca Front	David Schneider	Patrick Marber	Doon Mackichan	Notes	Radio Times description
1	1 December 1992	Ali Tennant, feminist and therapist; "The Smiling Bicycle of Amsterdam" song contributor	Peter, therapy patient; "Vegina" voice-actor	Adam Wells, 1960s figure and businessman; Lawrence Camley, highbrow novelist	Linda, therapy patient; "The Smiling Bicycle of Amsterdam" singer; "Vegina" voice-actor		Classic chat from On the Hour's supreme sports reporter and his guests from the world of theatre, politics and emotional tragedy.
2	8 December 1992	Janey Katz, hypnotherapist	Simon Fisher's father, John	Nick Ford, "queer" lawyer	Simon Fisher, child prodigy		Classic chat from On the Hour's supreme sports reporter and his guests from the world of theatre, politics and emotional tragedy.
3	15 December 1992	Shirley Dee, showbiz Cockney	Chris Lester, former hostage	Michel Lambert, racing driver; Phil Collins, Lester's fellow hostage			Classic chat from On the Hour's supreme sports reporter and his guests from the world of theatre, politics and emotional tragedy.
4	22 December 1992	The Duchess of Stranraer, member of the Royal Family	Matt Bradley, gigolo	Steve Thompson, impressionist and comedian; Craig Bradley, gigolo	Sandra Peaks, Junior Minister for Housing		Classic chat from On the Hour's supreme sports reporter and his guests from the worlds of theatre, tragedy and emotional politics.
5	29 December 1992	Sally Hoff, actress/singer	Bernie Rosen, Jewish comedian	Conrad Knight, actor and Sally's husband; Jack 'the Black Cat' Calson, professional gambler	Kendall Ball, Supermodel and episode co-host	"Live from Las Vegas"	Classic bonhomie from On the Hour's chattering sports presenter Alan Partridge and his guests.
6	5 January 1993	Amanda from Southampton, BBC caller; Yvonne Boyd, fashion designer	Tony Hayers, Commissioning Director of BBC Television	Steve from Hornsey, BBC caller; 'John/Jason' from Norwich, BBC caller; Lord Morgan of Glossop, irascible peer	Kerry from Withington, BBC caller; Trudy Skye, host of The Show on Def Two		The last programme of the series. Raw emotion, sleek sofas and hilarious anecdotes from On the Hour's supreme sports reporter Alan Partridge.
7	3 July 1993					Spoof "fly-on-the-wall" documentary about the making of the show	Award-winning chat show host Alan Partridge allows Radio 4 listeners to kneel at his keyhole. This documentary charts one hectic week in the life of Alan and his team as they make the week's edition of Knowing Me, Knowing You.
