= Jane Stanness =

British actress

- Born: Aberystwyth in Ceredigion, Wales
- Occupation: Actress
- Years active: 2000–present

Jane Allison Stanness is a Welsh actress, writer, and singer-songwriter, best known for starring as Deborah in the BAFTA winning comedy series Sally4Ever, as Matron in the 2018 film Slaughterhouse Rulez, and as Mary in the 2020 Sky TV comedy series Intelligence.

== Early years ==
Jane Allison Stanness was born Jane Alison Sherman in Aberystwyth in Ceredigion, Wales; later the family moved to Elysian Grove, Aberystwyth. Jane attended Plascrug primary school followed by Ardwyn Grammar school, finishing her A-levels at Ysgol Penglais School in its inaugural year. Stanness's first experience of acting was at the age of 15, playing the role of Sheila in An Inspector Calls while part of the Wardens drama group. During her teens she also worked backstage at Theatr y Werin at the Aberystwyth Arts Centre where she met many famous actors. Stanness trained at Trinity Laban Conservatoire of Music and Dance in London. In 1983, while working with the North Dyfed Dance Project, she gave birth to her first daughter, . Stanness moved to and is now a 30-year resident of Bath, Somerset.

== Career ==
Stanness's first appearance on television was in 2000 in the series Human Remains as a wedding shop manager named Jane Roth. She co-wrote seven episodes of Nighty Night and also appeared in a single episode in 2005 as Karen Pole. In 2012, she starred as Sheena the Punk Rocker in the film A Fantastic Fear of Everything ; the same year, she appeared as Biddy Ritherfoot in the television series Hunderby. In 2018, she starred as Deborah in Sally4Ever which in 2019 won the best Scripted Comedy BAFTA award. The same year, she starred as Matron in the film Slaughterhouse Rulez alongside Asa Butterfield and Simon Pegg. In 2020, Stanness played a lead role in the television series Intelligence alongside David Schwimmer and Nick Mohammed.

== Music ==
Jane was a singer-songwriter with psychedelic folk band Childe Roland in the early 1990s, before joining post punk band KarmaDeva.

- In 2012, she recorded and released a video of the track “Catch me” which was produced by Alonza Bevan.
- In 2014, she released her debut album "Just Another Girl" which was funded by a successful Kickstart campaign.
- In 2017, she wrote and performed all tracks on her second album named “Methylene Blue”.

== Roles ==
=== Television ===
| Year | Title | Role | Notes |
|---|---|---|---|
| 2000 | Human Remains | Wedding Shop Manageress | 1 episode -All over my Glasses |
| 2005 | Nighty Night | Karen Pole | 1 episode - #2.3 (writer for 7 episodes) |
| 2011 | Shopping for Friends (TV Series) | Guru / Café Patron | German TV Series |
| 2012-2015 | Hunderby | Biddy Ritherfoot | 7 episodes |
| 2018 | Sally4Ever | Deborah | 6 episodes (BAFTA Best Scripted Comedy Winner) |
| 2020 | Intelligence | Mary | 13 episodes |

=== Film ===
| Year | Title | Role |
|---|---|---|
| 2012 | A Fantastic Fear of Everything | Sheena the Punk Rocker |
| 2014 | Morning has Broken | Susan |
| 2018 | Slaughterhouse Rulez | Matron |
