= Crime Monthly =

British magazine

- Crime Monthly (Issue 17, August 2020)
- Editor-in-chief: Julia Davis
- Categories: Crime
- Frequency: Monthly
- Publisher: Bauer Magazine Media UK
- Founded: April 2019
- Country: UK
- Based in: London
- Language: English

Crime Monthly is a British monthly magazine published by Bauer Magazine Media UK in the genre of "true-crime" magazines. The first monthly issue carries the date April 2019, but was actually released to the markets on 7 March 2019. The magazine is subtitled Crime Monthly: The Darkest Crimes and Evil Minds. Julia Davis is the editor-in-chief and Steph Seelan the deputy editor. In addition to news, the monthly features interviews with "authors, crime insiders, experts, filmmakers, victims and psychologists to bring a new perspective on the world's most intriguing crimes and crime stories" says the launch kit. The magazine also contains a 16-page supplement of TV and entertainment reviews focusing on crime content in television, films, books and podcasts.
