= Oaklee Pendergast =

English actor

- Born: 24 June 2004 (age 21); Bexley, London, England
- Occupation: Actor
- Years active: 2008–present

Oaklee Pendergast (born 24 June 2004) is an English actor. He is best known for his roles in The Impossible and The Woman in Black: Angel of Death.

== Career ==
Pendergast made his acting debut in 2008, appearing in an episode of EastEnders as Felix Stewart, Jamie Stewart's son. In 2012 he featured in two episodes of Casualty. That same year, he made his feature film debut, playing Simon Bennett in The Impossible, which was based on the true experiences of María Belón and her family during the 2004 Indian Ocean earthquake and tsunami. In 2014, Pendergast landed another main role in the film, The Woman in Black: Angel of Death.

Since 2016 Pendergast has worked in a number of TV series—he appeared in all six episodes of Camping, in four episodes of Marcella, and had a lead role in Channel 4 comedy Home. The last, a sitcom, reunites Pendergast with actor Rufus Jones (who created and writes the series); they starred together in Camping.

== Filmography ==
=== Films ===
Year	Title	Role	Notes
2012	The Impossible	Simon Bennett	
2013	Wer	Peter Porter	
2014	The Woman in Black: Angel of Death	Edward	
2020	The Show	Tim 1	completed

=== Television ===
Year	Title	Role	Notes
2008	EastEnders	Felix Stewart	1 episode
2012	Casualty	Will Forrester	2 episodes
2016	Camping	Archie	6 episodes
2016	The Missing	Matthew aged nine	Episode: "Come Home"
2018	Marcella	Adam Evans	4 episodes
2019	The Feed	Ryan	2 episodes
2019–2020	Home	John	Series regular
2023	Archie	Young Archie	
2024	Masters of the Air	Sgt. William Hinton	Miniseries

== Awards and nominations ==
Year	Nominated work	Award	Category	Result	Ref.
2012	The Impossible	St. Louis Film Critics Association	Best Scene	Won	
2013	The Impossible	Young Artist Awards	Best Performance in a Feature Film – Supporting Young Actor Ten and Under	Nominated	
