= Catherine Shepherd =

British actress, writer and director

- Born: 16 September 1975 (age 50)
- Occupations: Actor; Writer; Director
- Known for: Peep Show; Sally4Ever; Two Weeks in August
- Parents: Jack Shepherd (actor) (father); Ann Scott (mother)
- Relatives: Victoria Shepherd (sister)

Catherine Shepherd is an English actress, writer and director. She played roles in Peep Show and Sally4Ever, and created and wrote Two Weeks in August.

== Early life and education ==
Shepherd was born on 16 September 1975 in Hammersmith. She is the daughter of producer, Ann Scott, and actor Jack Shepherd. She attended James Allen's Girls' School in Dulwich, London, and read English and Italian at Edinburgh University.

Shepherd's twin sister, Victoria Shepherd attended the University of Cambridge and was part of the Footlights. Victoria is a historian and author of Stony Jack and the Lost Jewels of Cheapside (2026) and A History of Delusions (2023). She also created and produced the ten-part BBC Radio 4 series A History of Delusions, and has produced other documentaries and strands for the station.

== Career ==
=== Acting ===
In 2004 and 2015, Shepherd played the character April in the sitcom Peep Show.

Other credits include Paddington and Paddington 2 directed by Paul King, Harry and Paul's story of the 2s, Ruddy Hell it's Harry and Paul, The Comic Strip Presents Red Top, The IT Crowd, The Peter Serafinowicz Show, and the BBC comedy Twenty Twelve written by John Morton.

==== Sally4Ever (2018) ====
In 2018, Shepherd played the titular role of Sally in Sally4Ever, written and directed by Julia Davis. The series was a co-production between Sky Atlantic and HBO. It is a dark comedy about a woman, Sally, who is in a dead-end relationship with her fiancé David (played by Alex Macqueen), and embarks on an affair with actress/musician/dancer Emma (played by Julia Davis). The series also stars Julian Baratt, Mark Gatiss, Joanna Scanlan, Felicity Montagu, and Jamie Demetriou.

Davis said that "I’d always loved Catherine Shepherd, who plays Sally, because she’s so understated and precise. And she corpses a lot." The series started as a short film idea developed by Shepherd, Davis and Baratt. The writing process consisted of Davis and Shepherd improvising together, and Davis writing this up and honing it. On set, scenes were taken both on and off script.

The Guardian said that "Every slight movement of Catherine Shepherd's face should win its own Bafta award." Paste Magazine said that the "biggest surprise about Sally4Ever is just how great Shepherd is: It's an understated performance of the highest order. In fact, understated might be an understatement."

Refinery29 called the series "disgustingly funny". The New Statesman said "Quite how a comedy can be at once so grotesque and so tender, so filthy and yet so plangent, I do not know. But it suits this (possibly slightly ill) viewer just fine." The Financial Times gave the series a four-star review, describing it as "fetid brilliance". The series won a BAFTA.

=== Writing ===
Shepherd has written for various film and TV projects. She wrote on Georgia Pritchett's TV adaptation of the hit podcast The Shrink Next Door (2021) for Apple TV, starring Paul Rudd and Will Ferrell. She also wrote on Buccaneers (2023) for Apple TV.

In 2011, Shepherd wrote and directed the short film See Me, which starred Olivia Colman. It was produced by Quark Films, Film4 and UK Film Council. Shepherd is set to direct Like a Virgin, which is being made with the BFI. Kate Ogborn is the producer. In 2015, it was announced that Gemma Arterton would star. The script was nominated for The Brit List 2011.

==== Two Weeks in August (2026) ====
Shepherd created and wrote the eight-part drama series Two Weeks in August. It was her first time writing a TV series, and was written over several years. It was produced by Various Artists Limited (VAL). It is a BBC project, produced in association with ITV Studios.

Filmed in Malta and Gozo, the series tells the story of a woman who goes on holiday to Greece with friends and family and gets trapped on an island. Shepherd said that it is: "a story about what it’s like to try and be happy in a very anxious and confusing world and at its core, about a woman struggling to play all the roles she’s been given by life. How do you enjoy yourself for two weeks in August when the world appears to be falling apart around you?" Jessica Raine, who plays the lead character of Zoe, described Shepherd's script is "Epic and nuanced. Funny and tragic."

The series was aired on BBC One in May 2026, and streamed on BBC iPlayer.

== Filmography ==
=== Television ===
Year	Title	Channel	Role	Other Role	Notes	Ref.
1998	Comedy Nation	BBC Two	Various	Writer	Series 1, Episode 11	
	Relate		Cast	Writer		
	Morsomme Foursome-Objective	Channel 4	Various			
	Starlings		Sara			
2000	Time Gentlemen Please	Sky One	Sue (Archeologist)		Series 1, Episode 7: "Getting Diggy With It"; Episode 8: "The Pub That Forgot Time..."	
2002	London's Burning		Colette		Series 14, Episode 8.	
2004, 2015	Peep Show	Channel 4	April		Series 2, Episode 4: ""University Challenge" Series 9, Episode 3: "Threeism"; Episode 4: "Mole-Mapping"; Episode 5: "Kid Farm"; Episode 6: "Are We Going to Be Alright?"	
2005	Blessed	BBC One	Cast		Sitcom Episode 4: "Just Looking (Stereophonics)	
2007	Hyperdrive	BBC Two	Arabella		Sci-Fi sitcom, Series 2, Episode 3: "Admiral's Daughter"	
2007	Get a grip	ITV1	Sandra			
2007	After You've Gone	BBC One	Mrs Turner		Series 2, Special: "And So This Is Christmas"	
2007	The IT Crowd	Channel 4	Jessica		Series 2, Episode 4: "The Dinner Party"	
2007	Dog Face	E4	Various (episodes 1-5)	Writer (episodes 1, 2, 3)	Dog-themed sketch show	
2007 - 2008	The Peter Serafinowicz Show	BBC Two	Various	Writer		
2007, 2008, 2010, 2012	Harry & Paul	BBC Two, BBC One	Various		Series 1, Episodes 1, 2, 3, 5, 6; Series 2, All 6 episodes; Series 3, Episodes 1-6, Special Series 4, Episodes 2, 3, 4, Special	
2008	Lead Balloon	BBC Two	Sandra		Series 3, Episode 3: "Fax"	
2008	Trexx And Flipside	BBC Three	Miss Olsen		Episode 6: "Kings Of Da Hood"	
2009	4X4	BBC	Cast	Writer		
2009	No Signal		Various (Voice)		Sketch Show, Episodes 1, 9, 10	
2010	D.O.A.	BBC Three	Lucy Carrington		Pilot	
2010	Hung Out	Channel 4	Maya		Pilot	
2011	The Comic Strip Presents: The Hunt for Tony Blair	Channel 4	Cherie Blair			
2012	Twenty Twelve	BBC Two	Vicky Long		Series 2, Episode 7: "Loose Ends"	
2012	Gates	Sky Living	Sarah		All episodes	
2014	Morning Is Broken	Channel 4	Natalie		Pilot (non-broadcast)	
2014	Cardinal Burns	Channel 4	Various		Series 2, Episodes 1, 2, 3, 4	
2014	Harry & Paul's Story of the 2s	BBC Two	Various			
	Servants	BBC	Charlotte Lewis			
2004	Black Books	Channel 4	Bridget		Series 3, Episode 5: "Travel Writer"	
2004	My life in film	BBC Three	Sally		Episode 3: "The Shining"	
2012	The Increasingly Poor Decisions of Todd Margaret	Channel 4	Celestine		Series 2, Episodes 2 and 3	
2015	An Evening With Harry Enfield & Paul Whitehouse		Sue, Olive			
2016	The Comic Strip Presents: Red Top	Channel 4	Julie			
2018	Sally4Ever	Sky Atlantic	Sally			
	Go Away	BBC		Writer		
2021	The Shrink Next Door	Apple TV		Writer	Miniseries	
2023	The Buccaneers	Apple TV		Writer	Series 1, Episode 4: "Homecoming"	
2019	Sorry	BBC Two	Rosalind		Comedy short	
2022	The Love Box in Your Living Room	BBC Two	Cast			
2022	Dodger	CBBC	Mrs Greenwood		Episode 3: "Imposter"	
	Booteq	ITV		Writer		
	How to Stay Together	Sky TV		Writer		
	Be Right Back			Writer		
	Party Piece	E4		Writer		
	Baggage			Writer		
2026	Two Weeks in August	BBC One		Creator, Writer, Executive Producer		
	Open †			Writer		
	Afterparty (working title) †			Writer		
	Skivvies †	Channel 4		Writer		
	Love Life †			Writer		
	Ballet School (working title) †			Writer		

=== Film ===
Year	Title	Role	Other Role	Notes	Ref.
2007	Magicians	Passenger			
2011	See Me		Writer, Director	Short film	
2014	Paddington	Geographer (present day)			
2017	Paddington 2	Nelson's mother			
	Walking On Sunshine		Writer		
	Are You Ready? †		Co-Writer		
	Like A Virgin †		Writer, Director	In development	

=== Radio ===
Year	Title	Station	Role	Other Role	Notes	Ref.
2002 - 2003	Concrete Cow	BBC Radio 4	Various (Series 2)	Writer (Series 1 and 2)	Series 1 and 2	
2003	Trapped	BBC Radio 4	Becky		Series 1, Episode 5: "A Boy in a Well"	
2001, 2002, 2005	Think The Unthinkable	BBC Radio 4	Daisy de Vere		Series 1, Episodes 1-5; Series 2, Episodes 1-6; Series 4, Episode 1: "Eurotank"	
	My difficult second album	BBC Scotland				
2003, 2004, 2006	Ring Around the Bath	BBC Radio 4	Xanthe		Series 1, 2 and 3	
2007	Safety Catch	BBC Radio 4	Sophie		Series 1, Episode 2: "A Wanting Man"	
2008	Miranda Hart's joke shop	BBC Radio 4	Tilly		Series 1, Episodes 1, 2	
2008	Listen Against	BBC Radio 4	Various		Sketch show, Series 2, Episodes 1, 2, 3, 4	
2007, 2009, 2011, 2019	Giles Wemmbley-Hogg goes off	BBC Radio 4	Charlotte Wemmbley-Hogg		Glastonbury Special, Series 4 and 5, Brexit Special	
2011	Brian Gulliver's travels	BBC Radio 4	Hajia		Series 1, Episode 6: "Jampoa"	
2011, 2012	The Simon Day Show	BBC Radio 4	Catherine		Series 1, Episodes 1-6; Series 2, Episode 1	
2012	Beauty of Britain	BBC Radio 4	Lucy (Series 1); Doctor Wansborough-Jones (Series 2)		Series 2, Episode 1: "Citroen UXB"; Series 3, Episode 1: "Come Stay with Me"	
2014	My First Planet	BBC Radio 4	Collins		Series 2, Episode 1: "Sample of Terror"	
2014, 2019	Kevin Eldon Will See You Now	BBC Radio 4	Ensemble Actor		Series 2 and 4	
2015	Cats and monkeys	BBC Radio 4	Mette	Writer	Radio play	
	Henry's Girls					

=== Theatre ===
Year	Title	Role	Other Role	Venue	Notes	Ref.
	Harry Enfield & Paul Whitehouse–Legends the Live Tour					
	Mapping the city	Sarah				
	Friends and family	Various		Soho Theatre Studio		
	The Edinburgh Comedy Revue		Co-Writer	Edinburgh Fringe / Pleasance Theatre		
	C'est Magique		Co-Writer	Gilded Balloon / Canal Café		
	Overtired and Showing Off		Co-Writer, Director	Edinburgh Fringe/Gilded Balloon		
	Dance With Me (Be Mine)		Co-Writer, Director	Edinburgh Fringe/Gilded Balloon		
	Friends and Family		Co-Writer, Director	Soho Theatre		
	Your Whole Life		Co-Writer	Traverse Theatre	Won a "Best of the Sunday Lizard" award	

=== Audio ===
In October 2018, Shepherd narrated the audiobook for Blue Sky Thinking by Ben Lewis.
