= Loui Batley =

English actress, singer (b. 1987)

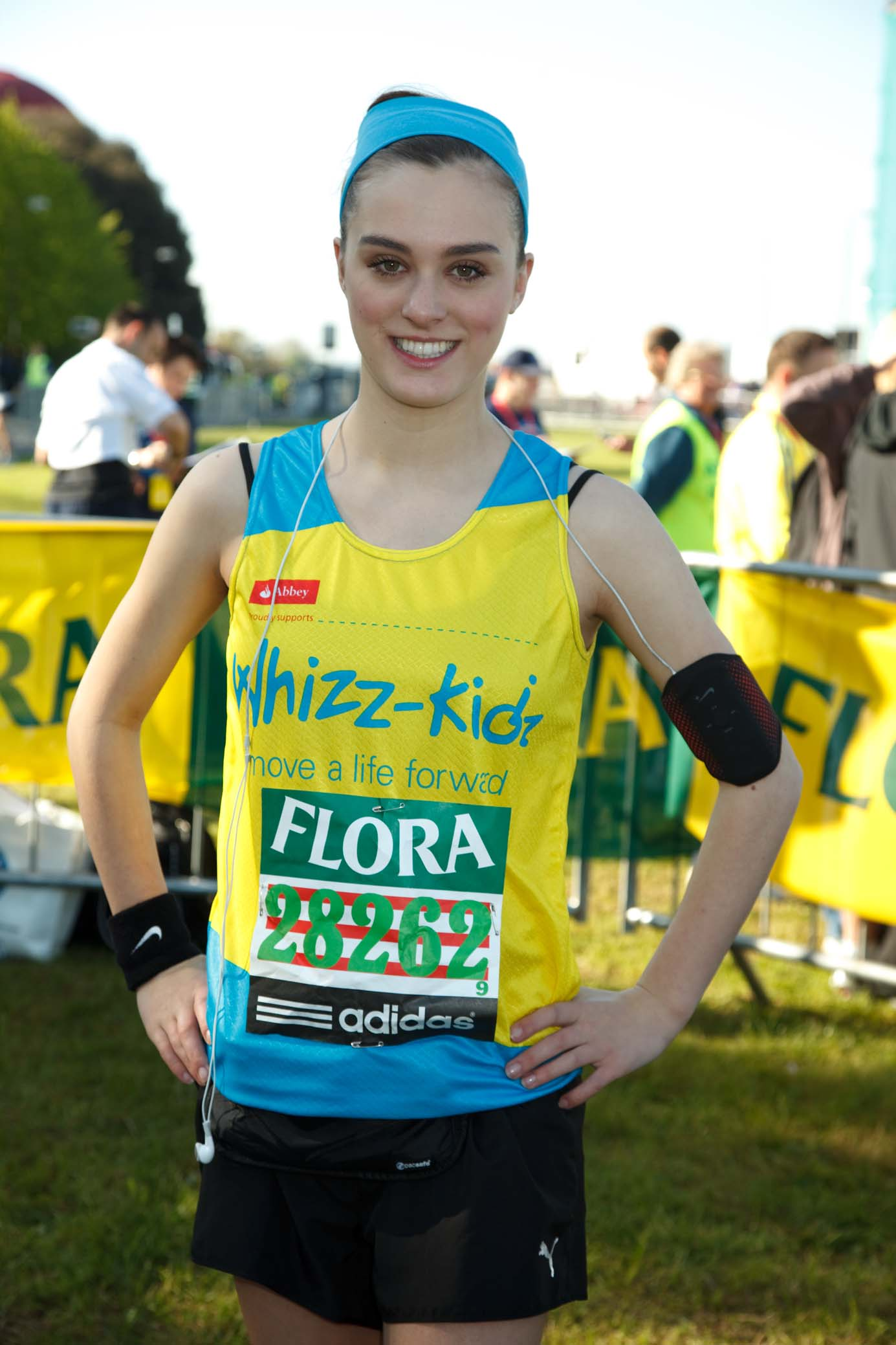
- Loui Batley in April 2009
- Born: Louie Anne Batley; 9 June 1987 (age 38); Chorley, Lancashire, England
- Occupation: Actress
- Known for: Nighty Night (2005); Hollyoaks (2005–2009)
- Spouse: Simon Lawson (m. 2013)
- Children: 2

Louie Anne Batley (born 9 June 1987) is a British actress, singer, and dancer. She is best known for her role as Sarah Barnes in the Channel 4 soap opera Hollyoaks.

== Early life ==
Louie Anne Batley was born in Chorley on 9 June 1987. She attended Rivington Primary School and Westholme Upper School in 1998 to 1999, but left due to dance commitments.

== Career ==
Batley had minor roles prior to her role in Hollyoaks, including a part as Angus Deayton's young girlfriend Natalie in the second series of Julia Davis' award-winning black comedy Nighty Night.

Batley played the role of Sarah Barnes on Channel 4 soap opera Hollyoaks from 2005 until 2009.

Batley was due to appear in the second series of the BBC show Just the Two of Us, but was dropped after her professional singing partner Russell Watson quit the show due to health problems. She also performed the opening song on 2007's BBC Children in Need, along with co-stars Kevin Sacre, Gerard McCarthy and Summer Strallen.

Batley was once a singer in the band Verity.

=== Television ===
Year	Show	Role
1995	Jake's Progress	Portia
2005	Nighty Night	Natalie
2005–2009	Hollyoaks	Sarah Barnes
2008–2009	Hollyoaks Later	Sarah Barnes

=== Movies ===
Year	Title	Role
2010	Following Footsteps	Maria White
2012	Tower Block	Amy

=== Other ===
Year	Title	Notes
2012	Clover	Advert

=== Theatre ===
Year	Show	Role
?	Broadway Theatre Project	Soloist
?	Submerged	Soloist
?	The Waltz Medley	Soloist
?	Six Feet Under	Soloist
?	The Nutcracker	Sugar Plum Fairy

=== Modelling ===
Year	Type	Designers
2007	Catwalk	Nolita
?	Catwalk	Pimlico
?	Catwalk	Oska
?	Catwalk	Woom Xoom
?	Catwalk	Shirin Guild

=== Awards ===
- Won
  - British Freestyle Champion
  - Lyrical Section
  - European Theatrical Stage Dance
    1st Place
  - Carlton TV – Britain's Best Dancer
    2003
- Nominated
  - IDTA Tap & Ballet Awards
  - Le Classique de Danse Awards
- Representative
  - NATD in the Grand Finals

== Personal life ==
Batley and Simon Lawson, who played Simon Crosby in Hollyoaks, have set up an acting workshop for up and coming talent. In 2009 they took on the lease of a public house, the Princess Victoria, in London's Earls Court Road. It was announced via Verity and Violet's Twitter account that Batley and Lawson had got married in July 2013. She gave birth to the couple's first child in January 2019. On 4 October 2020, Batley announced that she was pregnant with her second child.

Her brother, Tobias Batley, is a professional ballet dancer.
