= Two Weeks in August =

British television series

- Genre: Drama
- Created by: Catherine Shepherd
- Written by: Catherine Shepherd
- Directed by: Tom George; Matthew Moore
- Starring: Jessica Raine; Damien Molony; Nicholas Pinnock; Antonia Thomas; Leila Farzad; Hugh Skinner
- Country of origin: United Kingdom
- Original language: English
- No. of series: 1
- No. of episodes: 8

Production
- Executive producers: Catherine Shepherd; Tom George; Jo McLellan; Roberto Troni; Kat Reynolds
- Producer: Rhonda Smith
- Running time: 44 minutes
- Production companies: Various Artists Limited; Pellikola

Original release
- Network: BBC One
- Release: 23 May – 27 June 2026

Two Weeks in August is a British drama series created by Catherine Shepherd that premiered on BBC One on 23 May 2026. The series focuses on Zoe, on holiday with friends and family in the Mediterranean, who finds herself trapped on a Greek island.

== Plot ==
A group of old university friends go on holiday together, 20 years after first meeting each other. Zoe, a comprehensive school teacher, tries to hold the group together, putting her own needs aside. Her husband, Dan, is depressive. Nat is annoyed when the casual boyfriend of her gay best friend, Jacob, turns up at the villa.

There is a kiss between two members of the party, which splits the opinions of the group, and impacts the remainder of the holiday. Zoe also has visions related to Greek mythology throughout the series, which become increasingly odd.

== Cast and characters ==
- Jessica Raine as Zoe
- Damien Molony as Dan, Zoe's husband
- Nicholas Pinnock as Solomon
- Antonia Thomas as Jess, Solomon's wife
- Leila Farzad as Nat
- Hugh Skinner as Jacob, Nat's best friend
- Dolly Wells as Flick
- Tom Goodman-Hill as James
- Dylan Brady as Will, Jacob's boyfriend in earlier episodes
- Maria Almeida as Avery, Solomon's daughter
- Khalil Gharbia as Jon, a young handyman who becomes central to the plot
- Florence Banks as Léa
- Sonny Poon Tip as Dash
- Cassius Hackforth as Mickey
- Eliza Lambon as Eve
- Anthony Lambon as Theo
- Joe Dixon as Henry
- Tiana Formosa — Clotho, one of the three Moirai
- Charlotte Grech — Lachesis, one of the three Moirai
- Jane Marshall — Atropos, one of the three Moirai

== Production ==
The eight-part original drama was created and written by Shepherd. and was commissioned by Lindsay Salt, director of BBC Drama. It is a Various Artists Limited (VAL) production. The lead director is Tom George (This Country) who directed episodes 1-4, with Matthew Moore (Colin From Accounts) directing episodes 5-8. Shepherd and Tom George serve as Executive Producers alongside Roberto Troni and Kat Reynolds for Various Artists Limited, and Jo McClellan for the BBC. Rhonda Smith is the producer.

Shepherd described the series saying:

This is a story about what it’s like to try and be happy in a very anxious and confusing world; and, at its core, about a woman struggling to play all the roles she’s been given by life. How do you enjoy yourself for two weeks in August when the world appears to be falling apart around you? I hope it will be as funny and sad, as thrilling, beautiful, ridiculous and heartbreaking as real relationships between humans are.”

Filming took place in Malta and Gozo with the help of local production company Pellikola, and began in April 2025.

== Episodes ==
No.	Episode	Directed by	Written by	Original release date	UK viewers (millions)
1	Episode 1	Tom George	Catherine Shepherd	23 May 2026	2.52
2	Episode 2	Tom George	Catherine Shepherd	23 May 2026	2.14
3	Episode 3	Tom George	Catherine Shepherd	30 May 2026	2.28
4	Episode 4	Tom George	Catherine Shepherd	6 June 2026	N/A
5	Episode 5	Matthew Moore	Catherine Shepherd	13 June 2026	N/A
6	Episode 6	Matthew Moore	Catherine Shepherd	20 June 2026	N/A
7	Episode 7	Matthew Moore	Catherine Shepherd	27 June 2026	N/A
8	Episode 8	Matthew Moore	Catherine Shepherd	27 June 2026	N/A

== Broadcast ==
Two Weeks in August premiered on BBC One 23 May 2026 with all episodes also released on BBC iPlayer.

== Reception ==
Lucy Mangan of The Guardian gave the series a 5-star review. Mangan writes that the references to Greek myth "make the story feel only more authentic, eternal, universal." Cosmopolitan described the series as "Full of simmering tension". Radio Times gave the series 3 stars, describing the cast as "superb", but stating that "the series does end up biting off more than it can chew" in terms of number of characters and mythological themes. The review likens the series to The White Lotus (a comparison also made by Cosmopolitan) and The Drama.
