= Home (British TV series) =

British sitcom

- Genre: Comedy drama Sitcom
- Created by: Rufus Jones
- Directed by: David Sant
- Starring: Rebekah Staton; Rufus Jones; Youssef Kerkour; Oaklee Pendergast
- Country of origin: United Kingdom
- No. of seasons: 2
- No. of episodes: 12

Production
- Executive producers: Alan Marke; Jim Reid
- Producer: Adam Tandy

Original release
- Network: Channel 4
- Release: 5 March 2019 – 11 March 2020

Home is a British comedy-drama television series created and written by Rufus Jones that aired for two seasons, premiering on 5 March 2019, and airing its last episode on 11 March 2020. In May 2021, Channel 4 confirmed that they would not broadcast another series, with Rufus Jones saying the series may be revived in the future on another platform.

== Premise ==
Upon returning to their detached house in Dorking, Surrey from a family holiday in France, a middle-class family find an illegal immigrant from Damascus hiding in the boot of their car. The series follows Sami as he adjusts to his new life in Britain.

== Cast ==
- Rebekah Staton as Katy
- Rufus Jones as Peter Guest
- Youssef Kerkour as Sami Ibrahim
- Oaklee Pendergast as John
- Douglas Henshall as Elliot

== Episodes ==
Series	Episodes	Originally released	
Series	Episodes	First released	Last released
1	6	5 March 2019	9 April 2019
2	6	5 February 2020	11 March 2020

=== Season 1 (2019) ===
No.	Title	Directed by	Written by	Original release date	U.K. viewers (millions)
1	"Episode 1"	David Sant	Rufus Jones	5 March 2019	N/A
Secondary school teacher Katy, her quantity surveyor partner Peter and her son John arrive back home at their detached house in Dorking, having spent their holiday in France. They are shocked to find Sami Ibrahim, a 36-year-old illegal immigrant - a schoolteacher from Damascus - in the boot of their car. Katy wants Sami to stay, but Peter calls the police. Peter hangs up during the call, but the police arrive and do not believe Katy, Peter and Sami's story that Sami has lived in the UK for 6 years and is a friend of the couple. Sami is arrested. A misunderstanding during the police's interrogation of Peter causes the police to wrongly suspect that he is a people smuggler and he is also arrested. Both are released and Sami moves in with the family, who try to help him contact his wife Yasmine and their son George, whom he lost contact with in Italy, during their journey.
2	"Episode 2"	David Sant	Rufus Jones	12 March 2019	N/A
Sami is puzzled that Katy and Peter do not know the name of their local shopkeeper, Raj, so Sami introduces them. Having wrongly assumed Sami to be a Muslim, Katy and Peter are surprised when Sami informs them that he is a Christian. Sami becomes an asylum seeker. He collects his benefit from a post office, where a man in the queue is hostile to him, An elderly man and his grandson intervene by backing Sami. Sami's phone is snatched by a youth on a bicycle in the street. Peter finds the mugger and confronts him. The young man from the post office queue arrives and backs Peter, retrieving Sami's phone. At home, Sami receives a phone call from Yasmine.
3	"Episode 3"	David Sant	Rufus Jones	19 March 2019	N/A
Sami finds out from his wife and son that they are living with an upper-middle class German couple, heart surgeon Oliver and Eva, in Berlin. He visits a refugee centre, where he meets Adnan (who calls himself Leo), a restaurateur from his home city who moved to the UK two years ago. Katy teaches John's class. A pupil plays a prank on Katy, which John responds to by punching him. At home whilst Sami is out, Peter finds nougat and fireworks in Sami's bag. He wrongly suspects them to be explosives, until Katy corrects him. Katy throws Peter out.
4	"Episode 4"	David Sant	Rufus Jones	26 March 2019	N/A
Sami gives a talk to Katy and John's class, after which the mother of one of the pupils, Seb, hires Sami to tutor Seb in science. Sami receives a phone call from Yasmine, who tries to persuade him to join her and George in Berlin. Sami tries to persuade her to move to England. Sami visits Peter - who is living in a skyscraper in London that is being worked on - and tries to persuade him to return to Katy. Back home, Sami tries to persuade Katy to take Peter back. John plays a video game online with George. Sami is horrified to find out that Leo is part of people smuggling gang. Sami and Katy bring a small group of illegal immigrants that Leo is involved with to the building which Peter is staying in.
5	"Episode 5"	David Sant	Rufus Jones	2 April 2019	N/A
Seb's mother realises that Sami is not a science teacher. She tries to seduce Sami, but her husband comes home and punches him in the right eye. Raj reveals to Sami that he is gay. Katy invites Oliver and Eva to her house, and John invites Peter. Katy is angry with Oliver and Eva's arrogance, opposition to Brexit, dislike of the UK and insistence that Sami move to Berlin.
6	"Episode 6"	David Sant	Rufus Jones	9 April 2019	N/A
Sami attends a Home Office interview. He expects his claim for asylum to be rejected, so he phones his wife to tell her that he is moving to Berlin. She tells him not to, because she wants to be apart from him. Peter moves back in with Katy and John. He asks John to call him Dad, which he refuses to do. Peter proposes to Katy; she angrily rejects it, saying that she wants to reconcile slowly.

=== Season 2 (2020) ===
No.	Title	Directed by	Written by	Original release date	U.K. viewers (millions)
1	"Episode 1"	Unknown	Unknown	5 February 2020	N/A
Sami is angry that his asylum case has been ongoing for six months without a decision. Peter drives Sami to the hotel that he has been allocated to, where they, Katy and John meet another asylum-seeking resident, a gay Nigerian. Sami causes a confrontation at the hotel, then returns to live with Katy, Peter and John. Katy confronts a 15-year-old male pupil who is arguing with a female pupil.
2	"Episode 2"	Unknown	Unknown	12 February 2020	N/A
Raj invites Sami to join him in entering a marmalade festival, but the organisers prevent Sami from entering due to his immigration status. Raj is angered by that and dresses as a golliwog. The pupil whom Katy confronted falsely accuses her of sexual assault. She is told to stay away from school as the case is investigated. Peter is made redundant due to his company leaving the UK.
3	"Episode 3"	Unknown	Unknown	19 February 2020	N/A
Katy is questioned by the headmaster. On a bus, Sami meets a nurse called Naomi and registers as a patient at her health centre. Katy's alcoholic ex-husband Elliot visits, saying he has stopped drinking and wants to be in his son John's life. John is pleased to see Elliot, but Katy and Peter are hostile towards Elliot.
4	"Episode 4"	Unknown	Unknown	26 February 2020	N/A
Elliot takes John to a Drake concert. Sami and Naomi visit a vineyard, where she kisses him. He goes home, where Katy kisses him - which John sees.
5	"Episode 5"	Unknown	Unknown	4 March 2020	N/A
Katy attends her disciplinary tribunal at school. Sami visits the UK Immigration Service's offices in Bootle, Merseyside. Peter and Sami retrieve John from a party which Elliot had taken John to. Elliot tells Peter that John told him about Katy and Sami's kiss. Sami phones Yasmine to ask to join her and George in Berlin, but they tell him they do not want him to.
6	"Episode 6"	Unknown	Unknown	11 March 2020	N/A
Katy tells Peter that she has been given a warning at school and may resume her position. However, she decides to quit teaching. Sami is sent a letter about his application to be granted refugee status, but he has gone missing. Raj receives a postcard which Sami sent them from Greece. Peter and John go there and give Sami the letter. He opens it and smiles.
