= Alex Macqueen =

British actor (born 1973)

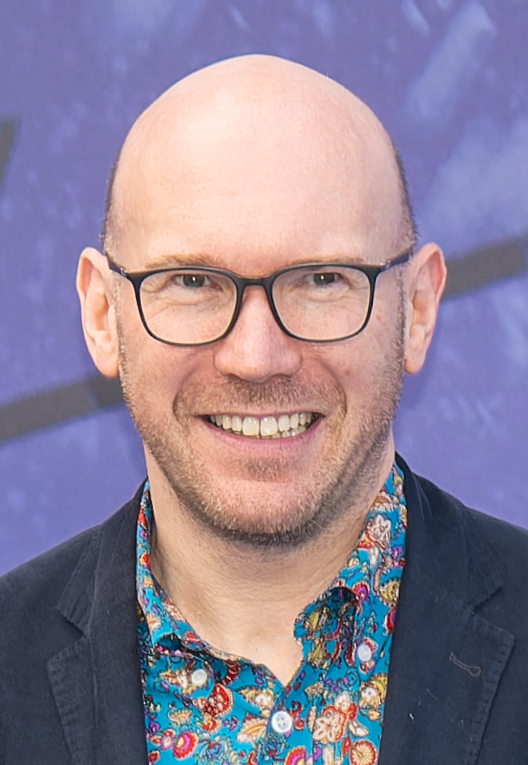
- Macqueen at the 2024 BFI London Film Festival premiere of That Christmas
- Born: Alexander Tulloch Macqueen; 30 November 1973 (age 52); Epsom, Surrey, England
- Education: Collingwood College, Durham; Pembroke College, Cambridge
- Years active: 2003–present
- Alex Macqueen's voice Macqueen in a recording for CAFOD; Recorded 3 February 2024

Alexander Tulloch Macqueen (born 30 November 1973) is an English actor and writer. He has appeared on television, film, and radio in productions such as Holby City, Hut 33, Peep Show, The Thick of It, Keeping Mum, Fate: The Winx Saga, and The Inbetweeners. He also guest-starred in The Durrells in series 4.

== Early life and education ==
Alexander Tulloch Macqueen was born on 30 November 1973 in Epsom, Surrey.

He was educated at St John's School, Leatherhead, from 1990 to 1992 and left to receive a first in English literature at Collingwood College at Durham University.

He went on to study for a MPhil degree at Pembroke College, Cambridge, graduating in 1998.

== Career ==
Macqueen played sarcastic consultant anaesthetist Keith Greene in 75 episodes of Holby City between May 2005 and July 2010. He appeared as the Rt Hon Julius Nicholson, Baron Nicholson of Arnage, the bawdy and persistently peckish "blue-skies advisor" to the Prime Minister in political satire The Thick of It and also played Sir Jonathan Tutt, the British Ambassador to the UN, in the spin-off film In the Loop; both were directed by Armando Iannucci. He also acted in the Comic Relief special of Mr. Bean in 2007 as a vicar. He played Kevin Sutherland in E4's comedy The Inbetweeners. In 2010, he starred as Howard, an anti-speed bump community campaigner in two episodes of Outnumbered on BBC One.

He appeared in the Comedy Central / BBC collaboration Kröd Mändoon and the Flaming Sword of Fire, in which he played Barnabus, the sidekick to the Chancellor Dongalor, played by Matt Lucas. He starred as Roy Tunt in The Hide, which premiered on FilmFour in February 2009. He won the award for Best Actor at the Marbella Film Festival in 2009 for this role.

Macqueen acted in a series of videos on YouTube as Clive Rudloe, a character who claims to be "the world's number one DJ". The videos are spoofs created by real-life DJs Above and Beyond. In late 2009, he starred in several episodes of The News at Bedtime on BBC Radio 4, in a variety of supporting roles. In 2010, he appeared as the publisher Malcolm Dodds in Woody Allen's You Will Meet a Tall Dark Stranger. That year, he also had a small role in the comedy film Four Lions. In 2011, he was in "The National Anthem", an episode of the anthology series Black Mirror.

In 2012, he appeared in a Doctor Who spin-off UNIT: Dominion, published by Big Finish Productions, in a role described as "the Other Doctor" who is revealed to be the Doctor's long-term adversary The Master; the storyline establishes that Macqueen's Master is intended to be from a point between the Masters portrayed by Eric Roberts and Derek Jacobi. He reprised this role in 2014 for Dark Eyes 2, Dark Eyes 3, Dark Eyes 4 and again in 2016 alongside Geoffrey Beevers, who had played an earlier incarnation of the Master, in The Two Masters. In 2021, Macqueen returned to the role in Masterful, a story published to celebrate the Master's 50th anniversary. He again returned to the role in The Stuff of Legend, an audio drama which was also staged as a live theatrical performance at Cadogan Hall in September 2024.

Macqueen had a lead role as Edmund in Julia Davis's black period comedy Hunderby, opposite Davis and Alexandra Roach.

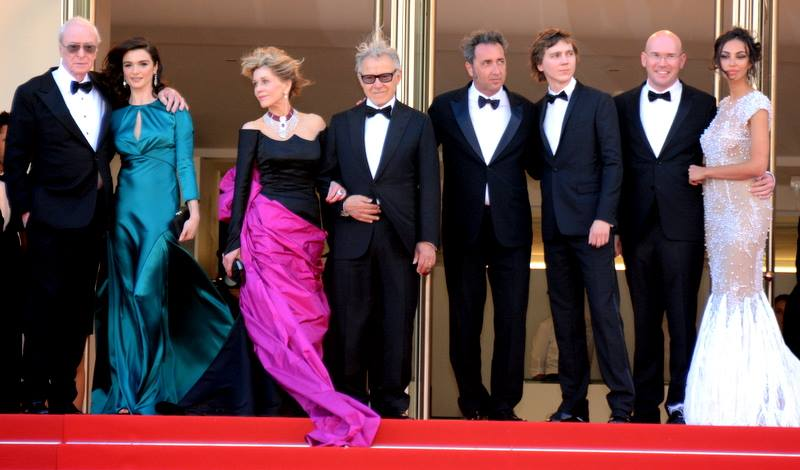
Macqueen (second from right) with other actors at the 2015 Cannes Film Festival

He played the role of Hove in the 2015 BBC series Pompidou, starring alongside Matt Lucas. He played Luke, the senior doctor in the six-part ITV comedy The Delivery Man. In 2015, he also played the royal crier in Cinderella. In 2016, he acted opposite Michael Caine in the film Youth, and played the role of Patrick Jarvis MP in series 3 of Peaky Blinders.

In 2019, he appeared in Horrible Histories: The Movie – Rotten Romans and in 2022, he starred as Stephen Gardiner in Becoming Elizabeth.

In 2023, he starred as Tindall in the Apple TV+ series Hijack, alongside Idris Elba and Neil Maskell.

== Filmography ==
=== Film ===
Key
†	Denotes films that have not yet been released

Year	Title	Role	Note
2003	The Emperor's Wife	Dr. Lambroso	
2005	Buried Alive	Unknown role	
2005	Keeping Mum	Train Ticket Collector	
2006	Dad	Son	Short film
2007	Magicians	Stooge	
2008	The Hide	Roy Tunt	
2008	Tu£sday	Mr. Jacobs	
2009	In the Loop	Sir Jonathan Tutt	
2009	A Very British Cult	Terry	Short film
2010	Four Lions	Malcolm Storge MP	
2010	You Will Meet a Tall Dark Stranger	Malcolm Dodds	
2010	Bonded by Blood	Prison Governor	
2010	Bistro	Waiter	Short film
2011	Chalet Girl	Macolm	
2011	Anuvahood	Edward	
2011	The Inbetweeners Movie	Kevin Sutherland	
2011	Pitch Black Heist	Isaac	Short film
2012	Gambit	Mr. Dunlop	
2013	I Give It a Year	Minister	
2013	Jack the Giant Slayer	Tour Guide	
2013	Dr Easy	Superintendent	Short film
2013	One Chance	Dr. Thorpe	
2013	Too Leach	Jeffrey	Short film
2014	Fear of Water	Charles	
2014	Crocodile	Andy	Short film
2014	The Inbetweeners 2	Kevin Sutherland	
2015	Slow West	Rupert Cavendish	
2015	Cinderella	Royal Crier	
2015	Dare to Be Wild	Nigel Hogg	
2015	Youth	Queen's Emissary	
2015	Not Sophie's Choice	Daddy	Short films
2015	Just Desserts	Dennis	Short films
2016	Domestic Policy	Unknown role	Short films
2017	The Intelligence Explosion: How to Stop a Robot from Turning Evil	Dennis	Short films
2017	Son of Perdition	The Man	Short films
2017	The Overcoat	The VIP	Short films
2018	Slaughterhouse Rulez	Lambert	Credited as Alexander Macqueen
2018	All Is True	Sir Thomas Lucy	
2019	Horrible Histories: The Movie – Rotten Romans	Sycophantus	
2020	Downhill	Charlie	
2021	School's Out Forever	Mr. Bates	
2022	Downton Abbey: A New Era	Mr. Stubbins	
2024	That Christmas	Mr. Forrest (voice)	
2025	Tornado	The Laird	
2026	Virginia Woolf's Night and Day	Sir Alexander Holmes	

=== Television ===
Year	Title	Role	Notes
2003	Keen Eddie	Gates	Episode: "Eddie Loves Baseball"
2004	Family Business	Photographer	1 episode
2004	Murder City	Ian Payne	Episode: "Big City Small World"
2004	Outlaws	Clerk	2 episodes
2005	Dead Man Weds	Scientist	1 episode
2005	Einstein's Big Idea	Chater	TV film documentary
2005	Peep Show	Jury foreman	Episode: "Jurying"
2005–2009	The Thick of It	Julius Nicholson	5 episodes
2005–2010	Holby City	Keith Greene	75 episodes
2006	Mayo	Administrator	Mini-series
2006	All in the Game	Dr Phelps	TV film
2006	Casualty	Dr Keith Greene	Episode: "All at See"
2006	The Wind in the Willows	Clerk	TV film
2006–2008	Pulling	Ian	2 episodes
2007	The Afternoon Play	Simon	Episode: "The Real Deal"
2007	The IT Crowd	Vicar	Episode: "Return of the Golden Child"
2007	Christmas at the Riviera	Barry	TV film
2008	Delta Forever	Alex	Episode: "Pilot"
2008	Trexx and Flipside	Immigration officer	Episode: "B-Ice's New Clothes"
2008	The Wrong Door	Captain Justice	6 episodes
2008	Lead Balloon	Brendan	Episode: "Spikey"
2008–2010	The Inbetweeners	Kevin Sutherland	5 episodes
2009	Kröd Mändoon and the Flaming Sword of Fire	Barnabus	6 episodes
2009	Comedy Showcase	Neil	Episode: "The Amazing Dermot"
2010	Outnumbered	Howard	2 episodes
2010	Hotel Trubble	Z Dogg's manager	Episode: "Catz 'N' Doggz"
2010	The Increasingly Poor Decisions of Todd Margaret	Hotel manager	2 episodes
2010	Miranda	Librarian	Episode: "Before I Die"
2011	Come Fly with Me	Nut allergy passenger	1 episode
2011	Campus	Bank manager	Episode: "The Culling Fields"
2011	Lewis	Dr Julius Fisher	Episode: "The Mind Has Mountains"
2011	Rock & Chips	Bernard Bird	Episode: "The Frog and the Pussycat"
2011	Holy Flying Circus	BBC Head of Rude Words	TV film
2011	Black Mirror	Special Agent Callett	Episode: "The National Anthem"
2011	This Is England '88	Fay's dad	Mini-series
2012	The Cricklewood Greats	Tim Dempsey	TV film
2012	Best Possible Taste: The Kenny Everett Story	TV director	TV film
2012	Mr Stink	News reporter	TV film
2012–2015	Hunderby	Edmund	10 episodes
2013	Plebs	Brother Quintus	Episode: "Saturnalia"
2013	Playhouse Presents	Marco	Episode: "Stage Door Johnnies"
2014	Trying Again	Martin	6 episodes
2015	Pompidou	Hove	6 episodes
2015	The Delivery Man	Mr Luke Edward	6 episodes
2015	Together	Ashley	6 episodes
2016	Drunk History: UK	Hardy	1 episode
2016	Hoff the Record	Kurt	Episode: "Rehab"
2016	Peaky Blinders	Patrick Jarvis MP	3 episodes
2017	Hospital People	Jeremy Lace	Episode: "The Hospital Awards"
2017	Babs	Peter Charlesworth	TV film
2017	Eric, Ernie and Me	Bill Cotton	TV film
2018	Silent Witness	Guy Bernhardt	2 episodes
2018	High & Dry	Newton	2 episodes
2018	Sally4Ever	David	5 episodes
2019	Road to Brexit	Charles Braxton	TV film
2019	The Durrells	Colonel Ribbindane	1 episode
2020	The Trial of Christine Keeler	Mervyn Griffith-Jones	2 episodes
2020	Fate: The Winx Saga	Ben Harvey	6 episodes
2020	Hilda	Alvin	13 episodes
2022	Becoming Elizabeth	Stephen Gardiner	6 episodes
2023	Extraordinary	Head teacher	Episode: "The Jen Show"
2023	Hijack	Tindall	Recurring role
2023	Here We Go	Dermot	Episode: "Mum's Classic Family Christmas"
2023	Midsomer Murders	Francis Shirewell	Episode: "The Devil's Work"
2024	Sister Boniface Mysteries	Merlin Crowe	Series 3, episode 2: "House of Misfit Dolls"
2025	The Feud	Nick	6 episodes
2026	Agatha Christie's Seven Dials	George Lomax	Mini-series
2026	Beyond Paradise	Anthony Westley	Series 4, episode 1
2026	The Hairdresser Mysteries	Lord Rupert	Series 1, episode 6: "The Bells"
2026	Number 10 †		Upcoming series
