= Rinkoff v Baby Cow Productions =

British High Court case

Rinkoff v Baby Cow Productions is a 2025 British High Court case involving the topic of what are informally called "format rights".

The claimant Joshua Rinkoff had created a YouTube show called "Shambles" that mixed stand-up comedy routines with a backstage sitcom drama, based on his own experience of presenting live stand-up comedy shows. Baby Cow Productions released a TV show Live at the Moth Club, broadcast on UKTV, that Rinkoff claimed infringed his copyright in the format of "Shameless".

Following arguments in court, the Recorder Amanda Michaels ruled that, although there were some similarities between the two shows, they were not sufficiently specific to constitute copyright infringement.

Legal commentators stated that the case demonstrated that a high level of specificity was required in order to prove copyright infringement in cases involving format claims.

== Cases cited ==
- Banner Universal Motion Pictures v Endemol Shine Group (re Minute Winner)
- Shazam Productions Ltd v Only Fools the Dining Experience Ltd. (re Only Fools and Horses)
- Green v Broadcasting Corporation of New Zealand (re Opportunity Knocks)
