= Sally4Ever =

British comedy television series

- Genre: Dark comedy Comedy-drama; Tragicomedy; Sex comedy
- Created by: Julia Davis
- Written by: Julia Davis
- Directed by: Julia Davis
- Starring: Julia Davis; Catherine Shepherd; Alex Macqueen; Julian Barratt; Felicity Montagu; Steve Oram; Jane Stanness
- Country of origin: United Kingdom
- Original language: English
- No. of series: 1
- No. of episodes: 7

Production
- Executive producers: Phil Clarke; Julia Davis
- Producer: Phil Clarke
- Camera setup: Single-camera
- Running time: 32-40 minutes
- Production companies: Various Artists Limited; Hush Ho

Original release
- Network: Sky Atlantic; HBO
- Release: 25 October – 6 December 2018

Sally4Ever is a British comedy television series created by Julia Davis. The series stars Davis, Catherine Shepherd and Alex MacQueen. It premiered in the United Kingdom on Sky Atlantic on 25 October 2018, and in the United States on HBO on 11 November 2018. In 2019, the series won the BAFTA for Best Scripted Comedy.

== Plot ==
The show follows Sally (Catherine Shepherd), who is about to marry David (Alex Macqueen), her wimpish boyfriend of ten years, when she encounters the charismatic Emma (Julia Davis). The two fall into a romantic relationship, but what starts out as an exciting and sexy fling takes an unexpected turn when Emma reveals herself to be a nightmare.

== Cast and characters ==
- Julia Davis as Emma
- Catherine Shepherd as Sally
- Alex Macqueen as David
- Julian Barratt as Nigel
- Felicity Montagu as Elanor
- Steve Oram as Mick
- Jane Stanness as Deborah
- Georgie Glen as Pat
- Vicki Pepperdine as Belinda
- Lena Headey as herself
- Sean Bean as himself

== Development and production ==
The series was originally conceived as a short film. Davis wanted to work with Catherine Shepherd "because she’s so understated and precise. And she corpses a lot". They, along with Julian Barratt, improvised some material.

For the series, Davis and Shepherd improvised material. Davis then wrote this up and honed it to create the script. They then filmed both scripted and off-script shots, a combination of which were used for the final edit.

Davis described her character of Emma as "yet another dark, twisted, ambitious, predatory, amoral woman and very much a reflection of me in real life."

Sally4Ever was given a seven-episode order by Sky Atlantic and HBO in May 2018. Sky Atlantic released the trailer for the series on 5 October 2018.

== Release ==
The series premiered on 25 October 2018 on Sky Atlantic at 10 pm, and on 11 November 2018 on HBO at 10:30 pm. It was made available for streaming on Now TV in the UK.

In Canada, it premiered on HBO on 11 November 2018 at 10:30 pm. It premiered in Australia on Fox Showcase on 5 February 2019 at 7:30 pm.

== Episodes ==
No.	Title	Directed by	Written by	Original release date
1	"Episode One"	Julia Davis	Julia Davis	25 October 2018
2	"Episode Two"	Julia Davis	Julia Davis	1 November 2018
3	"Episode Three"	Julia Davis	Julia Davis	8 November 2018
4	"Episode Four"	Julia Davis	Julia Davis	15 November 2018
5	"Episode Five"	Julia Davis	Julia Davis	22 November 2018
6	"Episode Six"	Julia Davis	Julia Davis	29 November 2018
7	"Episode Seven"	Julia Davis	Julia Davis	6 December 2018

== Reception ==
In 2019, the series won the BAFTA for Best Scripted Comedy.

The series received a 97% approval rating on review aggregator Rotten Tomatoes, based on 32 reviews, with an average rating of 7.75/10. The site's critical consensus reads: "The outrageously singular Julia Davis delivers yet another impeccable performance in Sally4Ever, masterfully walking the line between side-splitting and cringe-worthy comedy." Metacritic gave it an average score of 77 out of 100, indicating "Generally favorable reviews".

Sally4Ever was praised by Sean O'Grady of The Independent as "brilliant, but more than usually disturbing", describing the sex scene between Emma and Sally in the pilot episode as "Pervy, kinky, gruesome, cringey" and "one of Davis' finest scenes yet", and giving it four stars.

In The Guardian, Lucy Mangan gave it four stars and applauded Julia Davis for fashioning "another wholly sadistic half hour that leaves the viewer skewered and writhing in exquisite agony". Also in The Guardian, Hannah Jane Parkinson described "every single performance is excellent. Including, of course, Davis herself".

LaToya Ferguson, of Paste magazine, described Sally4Ever as "possibly the funniest series of 2018". The i Paper also described it as "one of the best shows on TV". American magazineVariety described it saying: "its piquancy in service of characters and relationships makes it the funniest new show of the fall, and the stateside arrival of a voice whose brashness makes clear how overdue it is to break out." Bustle described the series as a "little slice of dark comedy heaven" with "an actual slew of insanely funny and talented actors."
