= Up in Town =

- Created by: Hugo Blick
- Starring: Joanna Lumley
- Country of origin: United Kingdom
- No. of episodes: 6

Production
- Producer: Hugo Blick
- Running time: 10 mins
- Production company: Baby Cow Productions

Original release
- Network: BBC Two
- Release: 6 March – 5 April 2002

Up in Town is a six-part series of short (10-minute) monologues, featuring Joanna Lumley as the middle-aged, divorced and lonely Madison Blakelock. The series was produced for television by Baby Cow Productions, and screened on BBC Two. It has subsequently been released on DVD.

== Summary ==
Madison Blakelock maintains that she is content with her current life, eighteen years after separating from her husband, a corporate executive who worked in the city. She frequently evaluates the remnants of her past with a persistent optimism that contrasts with her immediate realities. However, as she navigates successive losses—including her relationships, financial stability, and her cat—the difficulties of maintaining this outlook become increasingly visible.

== Critical reception ==
The series received a positive reception from critics. The Times praised Lumley and her "rich, darkly comic and beautifully observed performance".The Guardian cited that the series deserved better scheduling.

The series has also been compared to Alan Bennett's Talking Heads series of monologues.
