= Hunderby =

British black comedy TV series

- Genre: Dark comedy
- Created by: Julia Davis
- Written by: Julia Davis; Barunka O'Shaughnessy
- Directed by: Tony Dow
- Starring: Alexandra Roach; Julia Davis; Alex Macqueen; Rufus Jones; Julian Barratt
- Country of origin: England
- Original language: English
- No. of series: 2
- No. of episodes: 10

Production
- Executive producers: Julia Davis; Lindsay Hughes; Armando Iannucci; Lucy Lumsden; Henry Normal
- Producer: John Rushton
- Camera setup: Film, single camera
- Running time: 8×30 mins (S1) 2×60 mins (S2)
- Production company: Baby Cow Productions

Original release
- Network: Sky Atlantic
- Release: 27 August 2012 – 17 December 2015

Hunderby is a British dark comedy television series produced by Sky and written by Julia Davis. It was first broadcast on Sky Atlantic in 2012. The series won two awards at the British Comedy Awards in 2012; it also won Davis a BAFTA TV Award for best comedy writing. Hunderby returned in December 2015 for a second series consisting of two one-hour specials.

== Plot ==
In the 1831, a woman named Helene is washed ashore after her ship is wrecked off the English coast. There, she is courted by Edmund, a local widowed pastor, and they soon get married under the understanding that Helene is still pure. However, she has a dark past that she must hide from him.

When Helene moves into Edmund's home, she falls under the watchful eye of housekeeper Dorothy (Davis), who is more than a little involved in her master's life and quite obsessed with his dead first wife, Arabelle, to whom, in her opinion, Helene simply does not compare. While Helene battles to keep her past a secret, she must navigate Dorothy's devious scheming, her husband's harsh critique and a potential new love interest in the form of Dr. Foggerty.

== Cast ==
=== Main characters ===
- Julia Davis as Dorothy
- Alexandra Roach as Helene
- Alex Macqueen as Edmund Suffolk Finch
- Rufus Jones as Dr. Foggerty
- Julian Barratt as Narrator

=== Supporting roles ===
- Rebekah Staton as Annie
- Daniel Lawrence Taylor as Geoff
- Rosie Cavaliero as Hester
- Ben Bishop as Tom
- James Greene as Old Ian
- Jane Stanness as Biddy Ritherfoot
- Rosalind Knight as Mother Mathilde
- Alexander Armstrong as Brother Joseph
- Kevin Eldon as John Whiffin

== Writing ==
The series was inspired by Rebecca by Daphne du Maurier, Thomas Hardy's Tess of the d'Urbervilles, and Bette Davis. It was written by Julia Davis and Barunka O'Shaughnessy.

The language used in the period piece was carefully, but combines different periods of language-use.

== Production ==
The series was shot entirely in natural lighting and candlelight.

The show was made for Sky Atlantic.

== Reception ==
Sam Wollaston, television critic for The Guardian, was enthusiastic about the programme. He concludes: "Hunderby is filth... the filthiest filth, but also top quality filth, and you can get away with a lot by being very good, and very funny, which it is."

=== Ratings ===
Hunderby debuted on Sky Atlantic in August 2012 with 246,000 viewers, the channel's second highest rated show of the week, after The Borgias. In subsequent weeks ratings remained high for Sky Atlantic, with figures all above 100,000. The series had 211,000 viewers.

=== Awards ===
In 2012, Hunderby won a British Comedy Award for Best Sitcom, and another for Best New Comedy Programme. For Best Sitcom, its competition was Rev, The Thick of It, and Twenty Twelve; for Best New Comedy Programme, it competed with Cardinal Burns, Moone Boy, and Alan Partridge: Welcome to the Places of My Life.

In 2013, Hunderby won Julia Davis a BAFTA Craft award for "Best Comedy Writing;” Davis was also nominated for a BAFTA TV Award in the category "Best Female Performance in a Comedy Programme.” Hunderby itself was nominated for a BAFTA in the "Situation Comedy" category.
