= Camping (British TV series) =

2016 British television series

- Genre: Comedy
- Created by: Julia Davis
- Written by: Julia Davis
- Directed by: Julia Davis
- Starring: Oaklee Pendergast; Shaun Aylward; David Bamber; Steve Pemberton; Vicki Pepperdine; Elizabeth Berrington; Jonathan Cake; Julia Davis; Rufus Jones; Rhianna Merralls; Daniel Barker; Nick Mohammed; Stephen Evans; Grace Hogg-Robinson; Zack Momoh
- Country of origin: United Kingdom
- Original language: English
- No. of series: 1
- No. of episodes: 6

Production
- Executive producers: Julia Davis; Henry Normal; Lindsay Hughes
- Producer: Ted Dowd
- Running time: 28 minutes
- Production company: Baby Cow Productions

Original release
- Network: Sky Atlantic
- Release: 12 April – 26 April 2016

Camping is a six-part British television comedy series created, written and directed by Julia Davis.

It was broadcast on Sky Atlantic between 12 April and 26 April 2016.

An American version based on the show was aired in 2018 on HBO, written by Lena Dunham and Jenni Konner.

== Premise ==
Friends gather at a campsite in Devon for Robin (Steve Pemberton)'s 50th birthday celebrations. The trip is organised by his bitter and controlling wife, Fiona (Vicky Pepperdine) and they also bring their over-protected son, Archie (Oaklee Pendergast). They are joined by old university friend Adam (Jonathan Cake) – who is also celebrating two years sober – his neglected teenage son, Davey (Shaun Aylward) and wife Kerry (Elizabeth Berrington).

The campsite is run by the unsettling Noel (David Bamber), who is most often seen washing his mother's stained underwear.

Late to the party, Tom (Rufus Jones), recently separated from his wife, turns up with his new love interest Fay (Julia Davis), and they are all over each other. As Davis says, their arrival "messes up the whole holiday and it descends into a nightmare by the end." The nightmare consists of the couples falling apart, taking drugs, vomiting, having sex with different people.

== Cast ==
- Steve Pemberton as Robin
- Vicki Pepperdine as Fiona
- Oaklee Pendergast as Archie
- Elizabeth Berrington as Kerry
- Jonathan Cake as Adam
- Shaun Aylward as Davey
- Rufus Jones as Tom
- Julia Davis as Fay
- David Bamber as Noel
- Rhianna Merralls as Lisa
- Daniel Barker as Darren
- Nick Mohammed as Dr. Tolley
- Stephen Evans as Antiques Shop Owner
- Grace Hogg-Robinson as Catherine
- Zack Momoh as Biggs

== Production ==
The series was produced by Baby Cow Productions, and producer Ted Dowd. Other producers included Lucy Lumsden, Ben Boyer, Julia Davis, Lindsay Hughes and Henry Normal.

The series was shot around Devon. Locations included a shop called Another Man's Treasure in Sidmouth; a pub; an off-licence; and Budleigh Salterton beach.

This is the first series that Julia Davis directed.

The series was originally going to be called Robin's Test.

== Reception ==
The show was nominated for two BAFTAs in the Best Scripted Comedy and Best Comedy Writer categories.

The Guardian said that the series is "craftily observed, beautifully performed, as well as typically, gloriously, boldly bleak" Eva Wiseman, of The Guardian, described the show as "Mike Leigh’s Nuts in May reflected in a puddle of blood."

Sarah Hughes (Frame Rated) gave the series four stars, describing it as "Tightly scripted, dense with clever references, and constantly daring its audience to blink first...quite unlike anything else on television right now."

Rachel Cooke, of the New Statesman, described the series as "the funniest thing I've seen in years".

== American remake ==
An American version of the show was made, also for Sky Atlantic (and HBO in America). It was written by Lena Dunham and Jenni Konner. It starred Jennifer Garner, Chris Sullivan, Juliette Lewis, Janicza Bravo, David Tennant, Bridget Everett, Bret Gelman, Arturo del Puerto and Duncan Joiner.

The Guardian said the series was panned in the US. Their review said that, despite some good performances, the series "deviates from the darkness and dread that made the original black comedy so perfect."

Julia Davis was an Executive Producer for the series, but said she did not contribute much creatively to the series, other than a weeks writers room where her ideas were not particularly liked, and she had not seen the final cut.
