= Slaughterhouse Rulez =

- Theatrical release poster
- Directed by: Crispian Mills
- Screenplay by: Henry Fitzherbert; Crispian Mills
- Produced by: Charlotte Walls; Huberta Von Liel
- Starring: Asa Butterfield; Finn Cole; Hermione Corfield; Michael Sheen; Nick Frost; Simon Pegg
- Cinematography: John de Borman
- Edited by: Peter Christelis
- Music by: Jon Ekstrand
- Production companies: Stolen Picture; Catalyst Global Media; Sony Pictures International Productions
- Distributed by: Sony Pictures Releasing
- Release dates: 31 October 2018 (United Kingdom); 17 May 2019 (United States and Canada)
- Running time: 103 minutes
- Country: United Kingdom
- Language: English
- Budget: £5.2 million
- Box office: $730,762

Slaughterhouse Rulez is a 2018 British comedy horror film directed by Crispian Mills. Written by Mills and Henry Fitzherbert, the film's cast features Asa Butterfield, Finn Cole, Hermione Corfield, Michael Sheen, with Nick Frost and Simon Pegg.

Slaughterhouse Rulez was released on 31 October 2018 in the United Kingdom and on 17 May 2019 in the United States and Canada.

== Plot ==
After his father dies, Donald Wallace (Finn Cole), a teenager from a working-class family, enrolls in an exclusive public school called Slaughterhouse, where he struggles to fit in. The school houses a few secrets, such as the recent suicide of a pupil last term, mysterious disappearances, an overzealous house prefect who descends from a long line of war criminals, and an enigmatic new sinkhole, caused by the Headmaster's (Michael Sheen) money-making scheme: fracking. Aggressive subterranean creatures emerge from the sinkhole and start attacking members of the faculty. Wallace then rallies a group of pupils to fight the monsters. The film ends with the monsters' defeat, the explosion of the school, and the remaining students walking away. Meanwhile, the Headmaster's dog, and Meredith, who survived the attack, witness the school's destruction.

== Cast ==
- Asa Butterfield as Willoughby Blake
- Finn Cole as Don Wallace
- Hermione Corfield as Clemsie Lawrence
- Michael Sheen as The Bat
- Nick Frost as Woody Chapman
- Simon Pegg as Meredith Houseman
- Margot Robbie as Audrey
- Isabella Laughland as Kay
- Tom Rhys Harries as Clegg
- Max Raphael as Hargreaves
- Kit Connor as Wootton
- Louis Strong as Smudger
- Jo Hartley as Babs Wallace
- Jamie Blackley as Caspar De Brunose
- Jane Stanness as Matron
- Jassa Ahluwalia as Yuri
- Alexander Macqueen as Lambert
- Charles Fitzherbert as Tompkinson
- Nick Kellington as The Beast and as Protester

== Production ==
This is the first film from Stolen Picture, a film and TV production company formed by Simon Pegg and Nick Frost. The film was produced by Catalyst Global Media and Sony Pictures International, and was shot at Stowe School, Windsor Great Park, and Chislehurst Caves, among other locations.

== Release ==
The film was released in the United Kingdom and Ireland on 31 October 2018.

== Reception ==
On Rotten Tomatoes, the film has an approval rating of 38% based on 34 reviews, with an average rating of 4.9/10. The website's critics consensus reads: "An uneven blend of horror and comedy that fails to satisfy on either front, Slaughterhouse Rulez aims for B-movie fun but doesn't make the grade." On Metacritic, the film has a score of 39 out of 100 based on reviews from 6 critics, indicating "generally unfavorable reviews". The film generated revenue of £737,670 from cinemas worldwide.

Andrew Pulver of The Guardian newspaper gave it a rating of 3 out of 5 stars.

== Marketing ==
The first trailer of the film was released online (initially via Twitter) on 9 August 2018.
