= Rufus Jones (actor) =

English actor (born 1975)

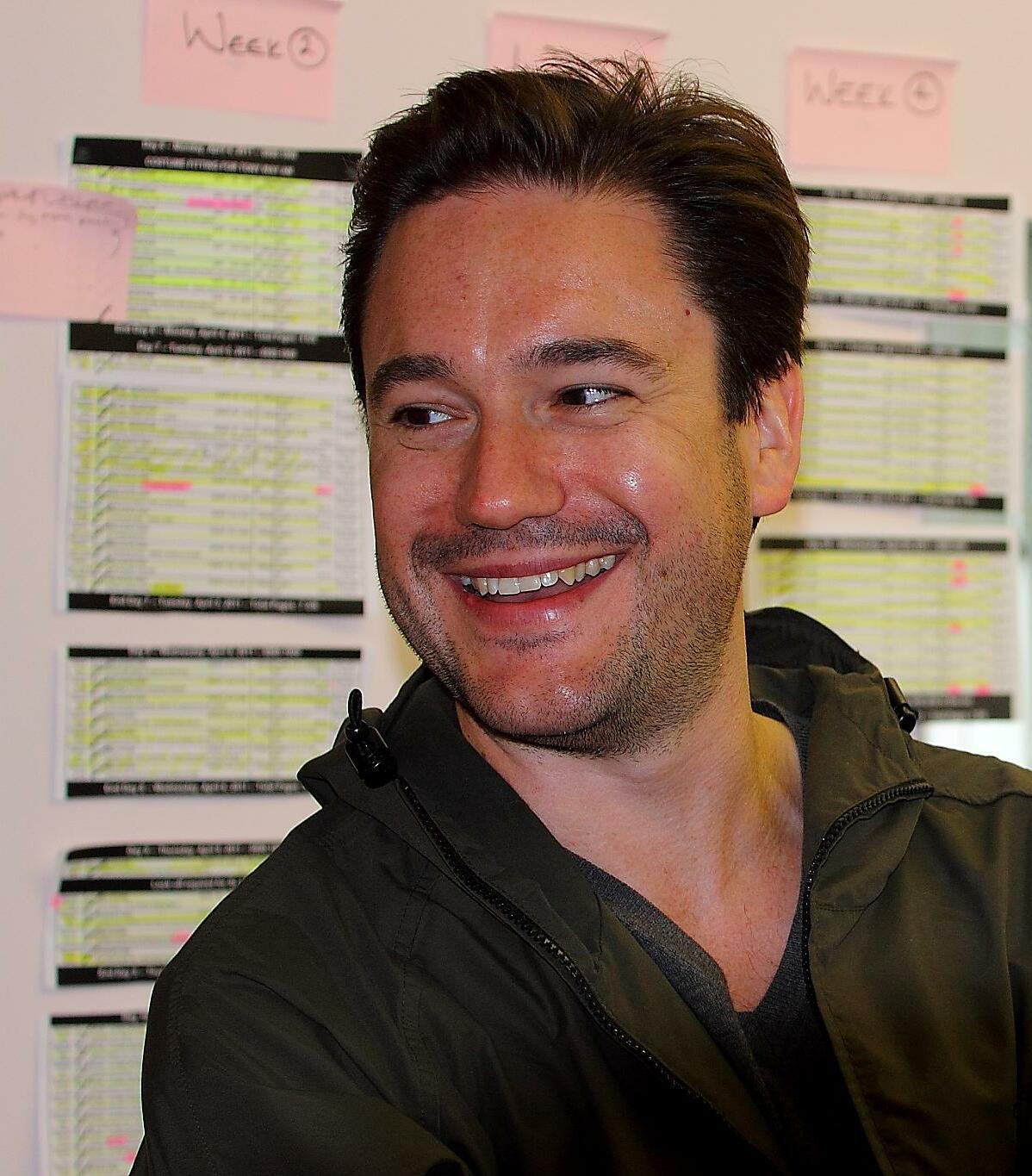
- Jones in 2011
- Born: 1975 or 1976 (age 50–51); London, England
- Occupation: Actor
- Years active: 2002–present
- Notable work: Hunderby; Camping; W1A; Home

Rufus Jones (born 1975) is an English actor known for his appearances on television which include David Wilkes in W1A, Dr. Foggerty in Hunderby, Tom in Camping, and Peter in Home (which he also wrote).

== Early life ==
Jones was born in London, and educated at Latymer Upper School and the University of Cambridge, where he studied English.

== Career ==
Jones began his career as one fifth of the comedy group Dutch Elm Conservatoire.

On television, he is known for playing Doctor Foggerty in Julia Davis's award-winning dark comedy Hunderby, producer David Wilkes in W1A, and Miles Mollison in the BBC television mini series The Casual Vacancy. He also played Terry Jones in the BBC Four BAFTA-nominated Holy Flying Circus, Cosmo in comedy-drama Stag, and Tom in Julia Davis's Camping. In 2006, Jones appeared as the journalist in series 2 episode 3 of the BBC comedy Extras.

Other credits include Mongrels (in which he voiced Nelson the fox), William & Sinclair for Sky Atlantic's Common Ground season, Episodes, It's Kevin, The Wrong Mans, Fresh Meat (series 2), Toast of London, House of Fools, Extras, Lead Balloon, Peep Show, Crooked House, The Increasingly Poor Decisions of Todd Margaret, Love Soup, Katy Brand's Big Ass Show, Green Green Grass, My Family, Losing It, Secret Smile, White Teeth, and Edge of Heaven. In 2011, Jones starred in the one-off BBC Christmas show Lapland.

His 2013 role as Nick Edwards, the slimy opposing candidate to Bob Servant, brought him recognition in the cult BBC Four Neil Forsyth comedy Bob Servant.

Jones has written for Angelos Epithemiou, Mitchell & Webb, the MTV series Fur TV, Jon Culshaw and many others. He was script consultant on E4's Cardinal Burns.

In 2012, he began portraying entrepreneur James Reed in adverts for reed.co.uk.

As a voiceover artist, Jones has worked on numerous commercials, as well as games such as Fable III, Killzone and Xenoblade Chronicles. In 2016, he joined the voice cast of Thomas & Friends, as the voice of Flying Scotsman. Most recently, he has voiced Vermis in Robozuna for ITV/Netflix, various characters in Sadie Sparks for Disney, Constantin in 101 Dalmatian Street for Disney, and is the narrator for the Little Princess.

In 2016, he played Coulson in the BAFTA nominated psychological thriller The Ghoul (directed by Gareth Tunley), and starred as Richard in the West End production of Dead Funny at the Vaudeville Theatre in London.

More recent film work includes Paddington and Woody in The Foreigner with Jackie Chan and Pierce Brosnan. He also played Bernard Delfont in Stan & Ollie with Steve Coogan and John C. Reilly, released in January 2019.

In 2018, Jones starred with Anna Paquin in Flack for Pop/W channel, released in February 2019. He also filmed Home, a 6 part series for Channel 4, that he also wrote, which began airing in March 2019. A second series was broadcast in February and March 2020.

=== Awards and nominations ===
In 2005, Jones was nominated for the Perrier Award with sketch group Dutch Elm Conservatoire.

=== Other work ===
Rufus has appeared on a number of podcasts including The QuaranTea Break Podcast with Simon Ward, Box of Delights, Rule Of Three and the Pilot TV Podcast.

== Filmography ==
=== Film ===
Year	Title	Role	Notes
2004	Honorable Men	Tyrone Powers	Direct-to-video
2009	Cut and Paste	Dr. Murray Sachs	Short film
2014	The Cunning Woman	Matt (voice)	Short film
2014	Channel M	Various	Short film
2014	Gutpunch	Roddy	Short film
2014	Paddington	Third Geographer	
2015	Honeysuckle	Simon	Short film
2015	Bill	Sir Walter Raleigh	
2016	Thomas & Friends: The Great Race	Flying Scotsman (voice)	UK/US versions
2016	The Ghoul	Coulson	
2017	The Foreigner	Ian Wood	
2018	Thomas & Friends: Big World! Big Adventures!	Flying Scotsman (voice)	UK/US versions
2018	Stan & Ollie	Bernard Delfont	
2021	Silent Night	Tony	
2021	Creation Stories	Bank Manager	
2022	The People We Hate at the Wedding	Tom	
2023	Wonka	Jenkins	
2025	Cleaner	Geoffrey Milton	
2025	Christmas Karma	Rupert Holly	
2026	Ghosts: The Possession of Button House	Richard Move	

=== Television ===
Year	Title	Role	Notes
2002	White Teeth	Crispin	2 episodes
2004	Messiah: The Promise	TV Reporter	2 episodes
2004, 2006	My Family	Gay Guy / Delegate	2 episodes
2005	According to Bex	Bridegroom	Episode: "The Time Warp"
2005	ShakespeaRe-Told	Doctor	Episode: "Much Ado About Nothing"
2005	Secret Smile	David	Episode #1.1
2006	Extras	Journalist	Series 2 episode 3
2006	Losing It	Dr. Hall	Television film
2006, 2010	Comedy Lab	Various	2 episodes
2007	Under One Roof	Various	Television film
2007	Lead Balloon	Brendan Carter / Vince	Episode: "Idiot"
2007	The Green Green Grass	Adrian	Episode: "Fifteen Minutes"
2007	Sold	Chris	Episode #1.6
2007–2009	Katy Brand's Big Ass Show		11 episodes
2008	Doctors	Giles Hamilton-Knight	Episode: "Witness to a Wedding"
2008	Midsomer Murders	Talk Show Host	Episode: "Talking to the Dead"
2008	Thank God You're Here	Ensemble Cast	6 episodes
2008	Love Soup	Andy	Episode: "The Menaced Assassin"
2008	Crooked House	Niggs Johnson	2 episodes
2009	Peep Show	Peter	Episode: "Jeremy in Love"
2010	Pete versus Life	Anna's Brother	Episode: "Eco Warrior"
2010	Dani's House	Adam Twittfield	Episode: "Chat Show"
2010–2011	Mongrels	Nelson (voice)	17 episodes
2011	Rock & Chips	Golden Egg Waiter	Episode: "The Frog and the Pussycat"
2011	Holy Flying Circus	Terry Jones / Jones the Wife / Bishop	Television film
2011	Lapland	Julian	Television film
2012	The Increasingly Poor Decisions of Todd Margaret	Dr. Professor Tigle	Episode: "How the Liver and the Salad Conspired to Ruin Todd's Good Deed"
2012	Pixelface	Pilot	Episode: "Come Fly with Me"
2012	Fresh Meat	Macauley	Episode #2.3
2012–2015	Hunderby	Dr. Foggerty	10 episodes
2014	Edge of Heaven	Prop Maartie	5 episodes
2014–2017	Episodes	Anthony Powner Smith	2 episodes
2014–2017	W1A	David Wilkes	Series 1: Supporting; Series 2–3: Main
2016	Camping	Tom	6 episodes
2018	Inside No. 9	Charles (voice)	Episode: "Once Removed"
2018	Thomas & Friends	Flying Scotsman (voice)	UK/US versions Episode: "Confusion Without Delay"
2019	Home	Peter	Series 1
2018–2019	Robozuna	Vermis, Sergeant Farrago, Luca (voices)	
2019–2020	101 Dalmatian Street	Hugo, Constantin, Cuddles (voices)	9 episodes
2022	Four Lives	John Pape	
2022	Theodore Roosevelt	Theodore Roosevelt	2 episodes
2022	Dodger	Matthew Marshall	Episode: "Train"
2023	FDR	Theodore Roosevelt	
2023	Funny Woman	Mr Magic	Episode #1.3
2023	Beyond Paradise	Terrance Witham	Episode #1.3
2023	Black Ops	Inspector Scholes	Episode #1.1
2023	Hijack	Felix Staton	Episode: "Comply Slowly"
2024	Rivals	Paul Stratton	8 episodes

=== Video games ===
Year	Title	Role	Notes
2009	Killzone 2	Helghast	
2011	Killzone 3	Helghast	
2011	Xenoblade Chronicles	Dunban	
2014	Super Smash Bros. for Nintendo 3DS and Wii U	Dunban	Archive audio
2018	Super Smash Bros. Ultimate	Dunban	Archive audio
2021	Bravely Default II	Sir Sloan	
