= Baby Cow Productions =

British television production company

Baby Cow Productions Limited
- Formerly: Stemdean Limited (1–18 October 1999)
- Type: Production company
- Industry: Television; Film; Radio
- Genre: Comedy; Comedy drama
- Founded: 1 October 1999; 27 years ago
- Founders: Steve Coogan; Henry Normal
- Headquarters: 1 Television Centre, 101 Wood Lane W12 7FA, London, United Kingdom
- Key people: Steve Coogan (Creative Director); Rupert Majendie (Managing Director)
- Owner: BBC Studios
- Number of employees: 11–50
- Website: babycowproductions.co.uk

Baby Cow Productions Limited is a British comedy television production company based in London and Manchester, founded by Steve Coogan and Henry Normal. Since its establishment it has diversified into radio, animation and film. According to their website, Baby Cow "produces bold, high-quality scripted entertainment across all genres for television, film and radio." The company's name is a reference to Coogan's early characters Paul and Pauline Calf.

== History ==
The company was founded in 1999 by Steve Coogan and Henry Normal, with Coogan assuming the role of Creative Director and Normal assuming the role of CEO.

In 2008, BBC Worldwide bought a 25% stake in the company. The acquisition was made at a time when BBC Worldwide was being criticised for its "out of control" ventures, though Normal told The Guardian that BBC Worldwide had not made the highest bid.

In April 2016, Normal stood down as CEO and left the full time position. He remained a consultant of the company for the following year and supported the company while they looked to replace him. Coogan then assumed a broader role as part of his transition.

Upon his departure, Normal commented that “After sixteen and a half years I've decided to take a long overdue break from TV and film production to pursue creative endeavours in other fields. I'm very proud to have been part of a company that has nurtured young talent, sought out originality and produced quality award-winning shows year after year. Steve has such a great team around him and with further support from BBC Worldwide, I know Baby Cow will achieve even greater success in the years to come.” Coogan then went on to add that “Henry has devoted himself brilliantly to the company over the years and deserves to pursue more personal projects. I salute him. He leaves behind a passionate team with great taste and the company he co-founded is in a strong place to grow."

Normal was eventually replaced with Christine Langan, who was the CEO until November 2020. She left her role as head of BBC Films for the job. BBC Worldwide then increased their stake in the company to 73% after Normal's departure. Langan has taken an executive producer role on every Baby Cow productions since she took the job including Camping, The Killing Machine, This Time with Alan Partridge and a new show entitled The Witchfinder, starring Tim Key and Daisy May Cooper, which premiered in the spring of 2022.

== Awards and nominations ==
=== RTS Craft Awards 2018 ===
- Costume Design – Entertainment & Non Drama – Howard Burden for Zapped (Series 2) Baby Cow Productions / Black Dog Productions / Itchy Coo Productions for Dave

=== BAFTAS 2017 ===
- Won Best Male Comedy Performance – Steve Coogan for Alan Partridge's Scissored Isle
- Nominated Best Comedy Writer – Steve Coogan, Neil Gibbons and Rob Gibbons for Alan Partridge's Scissored Isle

=== International Emmy Awards 2017 ===
- Won Best Comedy – Alan Partridge's Scissored Isle.

=== Writers’ Guild of Great Britain Awards 2014 ===
- Nominated: Best Situation Comedy – Up The Women (Jessica Hynes)
- Nominated: Screenplay – Philomena (Jeff Pope & Steve Coogan)

=== Golden Globe Awards 2014 ===
- Nominated: Best Performance by an Actress in a motion picture – Judi Dench – Philomena
- Nominated: Best Screenplay – Steve Coogan & Jeff Pope – Philomena
- Nominated: Best Drama Motion Picture – Philomena

== Productions ==
=== News ===
- LIVING News (2006–2009) and (2010–2012) for LIVING 5 x 29 mins

=== Television ===
- Bill's Included (2026) for BBC One. 6 x 30 min episodes
- Brian and Maggie (2025) for Channel 4. 2 x 45 min
- How Are You? It's Alan (Partridge) (2025) for BBC One. 6 x 30 min episodes.
- Changing Ends Series 3 (2025) for ITVX. 6 × 30 mins episodes.
- Changing Ends Series 2 (2024) for ITVX. 6 × 30 mins episodes.
- Changing Ends (2023) for ITVX. 6 × 30 mins episodes.
- Chivalry (2022) for Channel 4
- The Witchfinder (2022) for BBC TWO
- Red Dwarf: The Promised Land (2020) for Dave 1 × 87 minutes
- High & Dry (2018) for Channel 4, based on the 2014 online programme
- Red Dwarf XII (2017) for Dave 6 × 30 minutes
- Red Dwarf XI (2016) for Dave 6 × 30 minutes
- Wussywat the Clumsy Cat (2014) for CBeebies 52 × 5 mins
- High & Dry (2014) for Channel 4 Online "Comedy Blaps"
- British Muslim Comedy (2014) Channel 4 Online
- Undercover (2014) for Dave 6 × 30mins
- Moone Boy series 3 (2014)
- Uncle series 2 (2014) for BBC3
- Sensitive Skin (2014) for Movie Central/The Movie Network, 6 × 30 mins episodes
- Up The Women series 2 (2015) for BBC 2
- Timeless (2014) for SKY 1 HD
- The Trip to Italy (2014) for BBC2 6 × 30mins
- Moone Boy series 2 (2014) for SKY1 HD 6 × 30 mins
- Over To Bill (2014) for BBC 1
- Behind The Moone (2014) for SKY 1 HD 1 × 30mins
- UNCLE series 1 (2014) BBC THREE & BBC1
- Liam Williams Blaps (2014) Channel 4 Online
- Warren United (2014) for ITV4 6 × 22mins
- Hebburn Christmas Special (2013) BBC TWO
- Hebburn Series 2 (2013) BBC2 6 × 30 mins
- Starlings Series 2 (2013) for SKY1 HD 8 × 60mins
- Up The Women Series 1 (2013) BBC FOUR 3 × 30mins
- Gifted (2013) for Sky Arts 1 × 30mins
- Common Ground (2013) for Sky Atlantic HD, 10 × 10mins
- Tommy Tiernan's Little Cracker (2012) for Sky1 HD
- UNCLE Pilot (2012) for BBC THREE 1 × 30mins
- Uncle Wormsley's Christmas (2012) for Sky Atlantic HD, 1 × 30mins
- The Cow That Almost Missed Christmas (2012) for BBC1, BBC2 and CBEEBIES. 1 × 30mins
- Hunderby (2012) for Sky Atlantic. 8 × 30 mins episodes
- Moone Boy (2012) for Sky 1. 6 × 30 mins episodes
- Hebburn (2012) for BBC2. 6 × 30 mins episodes
- Starlings (2012) for Sky 1. 8 × 60 mins episodes
- Steve Coogan Live n Lewd (2012) for Channel 4. 1 × 60 mins episode
- Alan Partridge: Welcome to the Places of My Life (2012) for Sky Atlantic. 1 × 60 mins episode
- Steve Coogan: Stand-Up Down Under (2012) for Sky Atlantic. 2 × 60 mins episodes
- Mid Morning Matters with Alan Partridge: Special Edition (2012) for Sky Atlantic. 6 × 30 mins episodes
- Alan Partridge on Open Books With Martin Bryce (2012) for Sky Atlantic. 1 × 60 mins episode
- Nick Helm: Solid Gold Super Hits (2012) for Channel 4 online. 3 × 4 mins episode
- Uncle Wormsley's Christmas (2012) for Sky Atlantic. 1 × 30 mins episode.
- Johnny Vegas' Little Cracker (2012) for Sky 1. 1 × 11 mins episode
- Totally Tom (2011) for E4. 1 × 30 mins episode
- The Man Who Thinks It (2011) for Channel 4
- The Shadow Line (2011) for BBC2. 7 × 60 mins episodes
- Alan Partridge and other less successful characters (2010) for Channel 4
- Doing Chekhov (2010) for Sky Arts
- 101 Really Bad Ideas (2010) for BBC Comedy Online. 6 × 1 mins episodes
- Chekhov (2010) for Sky Arts. 4 × 60 mins episodes
- Mid Morning Matters for Online (2010) for Fosters Funny Online. 12 × 11 mins episodes
- The Trip (2010) for BBC2. 6 × 30 mins episodes
- Stand Up Hero 2010 (2010) for ITV4. 6 × 60 mins episodes
- Ideal Outtakes (2010) for BBC3.
- World Cup Diary (2010) for ITV4. 1 × 20 mins episode
- Lizzie and Sarah (2010) for BBC2. 1 × 30 mins episode
- FHM Stand Up Hero 2009 (2010) for ITV4. 1 × 60 mins episode
- Gavin and Stacey the Outtakes (2010) for BBC3. 1 × 30 mins episode
- Politicians Outtakes (2009) for BBC3. 1 × 30 mins episode. (plus 1 × 5 mins, 1 × 10 mins, 1 × 15 mins, 1 × 20 mins)
- Steve Coogan: The Inside Story (2009) for BBC2. 1 × 30 mins episode
- The All Star Impressions Show (2009) for ITV1. 1 × 30 mins episode
- Outtakes: US presidents (2009) for BBC3. 1 × 30 mins episode
- Home Time (2009) for BBC2. 6 × 30 mins episodes
- Brave Young Men (2009) for BBC3. 1 × 30 mins episode
- Gavin and Stacey 12 Days of Christmas (2008) for BBC3. 1 × 45 mins episode
- Gavin and Stacey Christmas Special (2008) for BBC1. 1 × 60 mins episode
- Ketch! And HIRO-PON (2008) for BBC3. 1 × 30 mins episode
- The Last Word Monologues (2008) for BBC3. 3 × 30 mins episodes
- Dolly and Laura (2008) for E4. 1 × 15 mins episode
- The Mighty Boosh. A Journey Through Time and Space (2008) for BBC3. 1 × 60 mins episode
- Karl Pilkington : Satisfied Fool (2007) for Channel 4. 1 × 30 mins episode
- The Scariest Night on TV (2007) for Sci Fi.
- Where are the Joneses? (2007) for online. 60 × 5 mins episodes
- Gavin & Stacey (three series) (2007–2010) for BBC1, BBC2 and BBC3. 20 × 30 mins episodes
- Classic Coogan (2007) for UKTV G2. 8 comedy shorts
- Stuck (2007) for BBC4
- The Former Ambassador (2007) for Paramount Comedy Channel. 10 × 1 mins episodes
- The Abbey (2007) for ITV1. 1 × 30 mins episode
- Rob Rouse and his Duck (2006) for Paramount Comedy Channel. 10 × 1 mins episodes
- Saxondale (two series) (2006–2007) for BBC2. 14 × 30 mins episodes
- Outtakes World Leaders (2006) for BBC3. 1 × 30 mins episode
- Ideal Xmas Special (2005) for BBC3. 1 × 30 mins episode
- Sensitive Skin (two series) (2005–07) for BBC2. 12 × 30 mins episodes
- Monkey Trousers for ITV1. 6 × 30 mins episodes
- Glen Wool What's The Story (2005) for Channel 4 (Comedy Lab). 1 × 30 mins episode
- MPs Outtakes (2005) for BBC3. 1 × 30 mins episode
- Kelsey Grammer Presents The Sketch Show (2005) for Fox. 6 × 30 mins episodes
- Ideal (seven series) (2005–2011) for BBC3. 52 × 30 mins episodes
- The Keith Barret Show (two series) (2004–2005) for BBC2. 12 × 30 mins episodes
- The Big Impression 2004 Christmas Special (2004) for BBC1. 1 × 30 mins episode
- AD/BC: A Rock Opera (2004) for BBC3. 1 × 30 mins episode.
- The Keith Barret Christmas Special (2004) for BBC2. 1 × 30 mins episode
- Hurrah for Cancer (2004) for BBC3. 1 × 30 mins episode
- Slam Poets (2004) for BBC3. 1 × 60 mins episode
- Sven and Nancy's Big Impression (2004) for BBC1. 1 × 30 mins episode
- The Mighty Boosh (three series) (2004–2008) for BBC2 and BBC3. 20 × 30 mins episodes
- I Am Not an Animal (2004) for BBC2. 6 × 30 mins episodes
- All Star Comedy Show (2004) for ITV1. 2 × 30 mins episodes
- From Bard to Verse (2004) for BBC3. 8 × 15 mins episodes
- Sweet and Sour (2004) for BBC3. 1 × 30 mins episodes
- Nighty Night (two series) (2004–2005) for BBC2 and BBC3. 12 × 30 mins episodes
- Posh and Beck's Big Impression (2003) for BBC1. 1 × 30 mins episode
- Posh and Beck's Big Impression Behind The Scenes and Extra Bits (2003) for BBC3. 1 × 28 mins episode
- The Private Life of Samuel Pepys (2003) for BBC2. 1 × 60 mins episode
- Whine Gums (2003) for BBC3. 8 × 15 mins episodes
- Brain Candy (2003) for BBC3. 14 × 15 mins episode
- Paul and Pauline Calf's Cheese and Ham Sandwich (2003) for BBC2 and BBC3. 1 × 28 mins episode
- Marion and Geoff series 2 (2003) for BBC2. 6 × 30 mins episode
- The Boosh Pilot (2003) for BBC3. 1 × 30 mins episode
- Cruise of the Gods (2002) for BBC2. 1 × 90 mins episode
- Up in Town (2002) for BBC2. 6 × 10 mins, 2 × 30 mins episodes
- The Sketch Show (two series) (2001–2002) for ITV1. 16 × 30 mins episodes
- Combat Sheep (2001) for BBC2. 1 × 30 mins episode
- Dr Terrible's House of Horrible (2001) for BBC2. 6 × 30 mins episodes
- A Small Summer Party (2001) for BBC2. 1 × 50 mins episode
- Marion and Geoff (2000) BBC2 6 × 30 mins episodes
- Human Remains (2000) for BBC2 and BBC3. 6 × 30 mins episodes

=== Film ===
- The Ballad of Wallis Island (2025)
- The Lost King (2022)
- The Phantom of the Open (2021)
- My Zoe (2019)
- Ideal Home (2018)
- Mindhorn (2016)
- I Believe in Miracles (2015) Feature
- SOS (2014) feature
- The Trip To Italy (2014) Feature
- Northern Soul (2013) Feature
- Philomena (2013) Feature
- Alan Partridge: Alpha Papa (2013) Feature
- The Look of Love (2013) Feature
- Svengali (2013) Feature
- Gus and his Dirty Dead Dad (2013)
- Marvin (2011) Animated Short
- The Trip (2010) Feature
- Down Terrace (2009) Feature
- Snow Cake (2006) Feature
- The 10th Man (2006) Short
- A Cock and Bull Story (2005) Feature
- Dating Ray Fenwick (2005) Short
- 24 Hour Party People (2002) Feature
- The Parole Officer (2001) Feature

=== Animation ===
- I Am Not an Animal (2004) for BBC2. 6 x 30 min episodes.
- The Cow that Almost Missed Christmas (2012) for CBeebies. 1 x 30 mins episode.
- Uncle Wormsley's Christmas (2012) for Sky Atlantic. 1 x 30 min episodes.
- Warren United (2014) for ITV4. 6 x 30 min episodes.
- Wussywat the Clumsy Cat for CBeebies. 52 × 5 mins episodes.

=== Radio ===
- Nebulous (three series) (2005–2008) for BBC Radio 4. 18 x 30 mins episodes

== See also ==
- Rinkoff v Baby Cow Productions
