= Human Remains (TV series) =

BBC TV comedy-drama (2000)

- Region 2 DVD cover.
- Genre: Anthology series Black comedy Mockumentary
- Written by: Rob Brydon; Julia Davis
- Starring: Rob Brydon; Julia Davis
- Country of origin: United Kingdom
- Original language: English
- No. of series: 1
- No. of episodes: 7

Production
- Running time: 30 minutes
- Production company: Baby Cow Productions

Original release
- Network: BBC Two
- Release: 13 November – 18 December 2000

Human Remains is a British black comedy television series, written by and starring Rob Brydon and Julia Davis, that aired in 2000. Each episode documented the relationship of a different couple, all of whom were played by Brydon and Davis and were unhappy, in the style of a fly-on-the-wall documentary. The show's humour derives from such bleak topics as domestic violence, chronic depression and death. Davis later used some of these themes in her solo project Nighty Night.

Ruth Jones, who would later work with Davis in Nighty Night, appears in the third episode. She would later co-write the acclaimed series Gavin & Stacey, in which she, Brydon and Davis appear.

== Writing and production ==
The series was written by Julia Davis and Rob Brydon, who were so sure of a commission they wrote all six episodes before finalising the deal. They wrote it in a flat in the same building complex where the late Kenneth Williams once lived. It was directed by Matt Lipsey and produced by Alison Mcphail. Executive producers were Henry Normal and Steve Coogan.

After creating the concept for the series, Davis and Brydon set about developing the material for the six episodes. Avoiding more conventional methods of writing the scripts, the pair instead opted to record themselves on camera and in character, to develop their various characters and written material. These recordings were then later on used as the basis for the written scripts.

== Episodes ==
=== "An English Squeak" ===
The apparently bucolic aristo-existence of Peter and Flick is shadowed by an ailment on her part that makes physical intimacy impossible. Still reeling from the death of her true love Geoffrey, Flick has little time for the downtrodden, childish, and unimpressive Peter. However, he waits on his indifferent wife hand and foot, nursing her through her struggle with an imaginary illness which, in Flick's own words, means "penile accommodation is absolutely impossible", despite a highly suspicious relationship with her masseur. Flick rarely acknowledges this compassion, is utterly exasperated with Peter's small stature, and is more than happy to bury him in the pet cemetery when his time to leave this world comes. Peter's main goal is to win a juvenile showjumping competition he is taking part in, but this falls on his birthday, much to the annoyance of Flick, who has gone to great efforts to throw a children's birthday party complete with clown and macabre piano music.

=== "Slither In" ===
"Ignorance is bliss, that to me is the beauty of a coma". Brummie B&B owners Gordon and Sheila fit their swinging lifestyle alongside looking after Sheila's coma-stricken sister, Val. Despite a relatively happy marriage, Sheila isn't physically attracted to Gordon, describing the first time she saw him naked as "like a road accident. Shocking, but you can't help looking!" Uneasy at the thought of eventually losing her sister, Sheila doesn't know how to handle it. Gordon reminds her that Val's death will be a blessing, as they can expand their swinging room into the bedroom she currently occupies. The episode concludes with Val having been relegated to the corner of the room and covered in a dust sheet as the sex-dungeon 'play room' is expanded into her bedroom.

=== "All Over My Glasses" ===
Michelle and Stephen are planning their wedding day. The first dance is R-Kelly's "Bump and Grind" and there are five boxes of Doritos for the reception. The "simple" Michelle seems oblivious to abusive yob Stephen's latent homosexual tendencies, perhaps preoccupied with her unhealthy obsession with Princess Diana. In fact, Michelle is so obsessed that, on the night of Diana's death, she drove down to the local underpass to "feel how she must have felt". Stephen was in the driver's seat "rightly or wrongly, speeding like a maniac" and her uncle Roy was Mr. Dodi, "Laughing and swearing and that."

=== "Straight as a Flute" ===
When not making curly sausage casseroles for the vicar, Beverly and Tony survey their neighbour's Satan-inspired garden and tell of life under the full gaze of the Lord. They do have other ways of keeping busy though, to the detriment of Tony's heart. Whilst he isn't conducting bizarre demonstrations at his workplace and Beverly isn't dabbling in a bit of hair and beauty, they can be found attending to their dogs or indulging in Scottish country dancing. The pair also run "top up" meetings for their fellow church goers. As Beverly puts it "If Church is your vaccination against Satan, these meetings are your boosters".

=== "Hairless" ===
"My songs are like my children," says singer Fonte Bund. "Yet they're also like my parents, or a special uncle who is particularly friendly at Christmas time". Fonte seems to have no reservations about passing off the work of Alanis Morissette as her own ("All I'm taking is the tune and the lyrics, that's all I'm taking"), and is often casting aside her more creative musical partner, Barne, when it comes to singing - now opting to double up with her crippled lesbian pal, Susan, on stage. After the events of this episode, Fonte is left devastated by Susan's death. But, as Barne puts it; "If you've got an electric wheelchair and a cliffside bungalow, you're asking for trouble, and that's what she got!"

=== "More Than Happy" ===
Coastal shopkeeper Les's optimism has carried him and his wife, Ray, through eight traumatic married years, which includes the loss of their children and subsequent public suspicion that they were somehow involved. They try and eke out a living by diversifying their trade as a florist by selling body piercings, bras and a banal range of sandwiches - "We don't do your fancy sandwiches, brown bread, or anything..." Ray seems to be getting ever more depressed by the loneliness, financial worries and the devastating events of the past. Her fleeting solace comes from an interest in arts and crafts (although she's clearly no Picasso) and a rather painful form of sexual relief. Les comments, "You hear of people who have all sorts of sexual hang-ups...and I'm one of them."

=== "The Fonte Bund Band Live" ===
Follow Fonte and Barne as they try to make a good impression as a support act at a real life music event. Will Fonte's flirting and sugary compliments help their chances of securing a place on the tour bus? Or will creative differences as well as Fonte's total hatred of Barne put a spanner in the works? Although in many respects a seventh episode, this special that was released as an extra on the 2003 DVD was never classed as part of the series as a whole, and differs in writing and visual style to the televised episodes.

== Reception ==
In 2009, The Guardian called it "one of the best comedies in the past ten years". Vice wrote that it "stands as one of Britain's most unusual and innovative comedies".

== DVD ==
The DVD contains the following extras:

- Commentary with Rob Brydon and Julia Davis
- Fonte Bund Band Live, following Fonte and Barne on tour
- Multi-angle option to view original character improvisations
- Deleted Scenes
- Outtakes
- Make Up and Wardrobe Tests
- Three BBC trailers
- Photo gallery
- Les's songs
