= Nighty Night =

British TV sitcom (2004–2005)

- Genre: Sitcom; Dark comedy Comedy-drama; Surreal humour Horror
- Created by: Julia Davis
- Written by: Julia Davis
- Directed by: Tony Dow; Dewi Humphreys
- Starring: Julia Davis; Rebecca Front; Angus Deayton; Kevin Eldon; Ruth Jones; Mark Gatiss; Felicity Montagu; Michael Fenton Stevens
- Country of origin: United Kingdom
- No. of series: 2
- No. of episodes: 12

Production
- Executive producers: Henry Normal; Steve Coogan
- Producers: Ted Dowd; Alison MacPhail
- Running time: 30 minutes
- Production company: Baby Cow Productions

Original release
- Network: BBC Three
- Release: 6 January 2004 – 11 October 2005

Nighty Night is a BBC black comedy television sitcom starring Julia Davis. It was first broadcast on 6 January 2004 on BBC Three.

== Premise ==
Notorious for its dark humour, the show follows narcissistic, sociopathic hairdresser Jill Tyrell (Julia Davis) alongside her dim-witted assistant Linda (Ruth Jones). Jill learns that her husband Terry (Kevin Eldon) has cancer. She uses this to manipulate new neighbour Cathy Cole (Rebecca Front), who has multiple sclerosis, and her husband Don (Angus Deayton), a doctor and the man with whom Jill becomes increasingly obsessed.

== Writing ==
Julia Davis was the creator and writer for the series. She has cited Ingmar Bergman and Abigail's Party as influences. She has also said the social satire has come from observing her parents: "I think my parents belonged to that generation of people between 50 and 60 where their friendships are not very close, that suburban world of tense formality, while I really feel I talk about intimate things with my friends".

The second series was initially proposed as a Christmas special, but then developed into a full series. Mark Gatiss described the second series as "broader" and "filthier". Davis has said she was not happy with the second series, saying: "you get a bit more money, you move location, and you think, I mustn't bore people, I need to do something else. And I just feel now that it was too ridiculous.” Both Davis and Gatiss expressed to each other that they felt the series was less funny and that they had less chemistry whilst filming.

=== Characters ===
The character of Jill was inspired by a mixture of things, including: the character Beverly from Human Remains; and Davis' job in the Finance department of Bath University. She told The Guardian that "Most of Jill is an amalgam of women I've seen or worked with in the West Country." She described her background thinking on Jill as:

I sort of think that she was abandoned in childhood – fostered or given away or something. I'm sure she didn't have proper parents around her. For a while, I did think of her having an old mother – a real witchy frightening mum living in the attic – who made her the way she is.

Ruth Jones' character, Linda, was also a development of one of her characters in Human Remains, as well as someone in Cardiff who worked in a shop, as well as a beauty therapist in Cardiff. Linda's asthma was informed by much of the cast's experience of asthma.

The character of Don was originally offered to Colin Firth, who did not respond to the offer. Rebecca Front said that her character Cath is not really about her being in a wheelchair, it is about someone who is "crippled by politeness".

Mark Gatiss based his character's tic on someone he knew, who he used to go out with. A lot of the character was a product of improvisation.

Kevin Eldon's character, Terry, was not featured in the second series, as Davis could not think of what to do with his character. Davis wanted the character of Cath to become stronger and flirtatious in the second series, but to revert to her powerless "sexless" character when Jill comes back into her life. In the second series, Don is having a midlife crisis.

== Production ==
The theme tune used in the beginning of both series and during the closing credits for the first is an excerpt from the Spaghetti Western My Name Is Nobody, composed by the Italian film composer Ennio Morricone.

=== Location ===
Parts of the show were filmed in the Surrey town of Dorking and the village of Cobham, the latter includes the cul-de-sac where Jill and the Coles live.

The second series was filmed in Bude, Cornwall. Mark Gatiss described the filming as "like a wonderful holiday". The last 15 minutes of episode six was filmed in Steve Coogan's house.

=== Financing ===
The second series was partly funded through The Oxygen Channel (US).

== Cast and characters ==
=== Main cast ===
- Julia Davis as Jill Tyrell
- Angus Deayton as Don Cole
- Rebecca Front as Cathy Cole
- Kevin Eldon as Terry (series 1)
- Ruth Jones as Linda
- Mark Gatiss as Glen Bulb
- Felicity Montagu as Sue 2
- Michael Fenton Stevens as Vicar Gordon (series 1; guest series 2)

=== Supporting cast ===
- Kitty Fitzgerald as Joy (series 1)
- Vicki Pepperdine as Mrs. Horner (series 1)
- Ralph Brown as Jacques (series 2)
- Miranda Hart as Beth (series 2)
- Llewella Gideon as Floella Umbagabe (series 2)
- Loui Batley as Natalie (series 2)
- Marc Wootton as Gary Furze (series 1) and Dennis (series 2)
- Georgie Glen as Sister May (series 1) and Bluebell (series 2)
- Bruce (Cath and Don's son)

== Costume ==
Jill's costume was created by Claire Finlay.

Mark Gatiss brought his teeth for his character from a role in The League of Gentlemen.

Marc Wootton also is brought along a brace for his scene in series 1 as Gary Furze in the dating agency.

== Plot ==
=== First series ===
Immediately after her husband begins cancer treatment, Jill goes to a dating agency to find another man, seemingly content in the knowledge that her husband will shortly die. Jill uses her status as widow (despite Terry being still alive) to gain sympathy from her neighbours and co-workers. Don is a family doctor and his wife Cathy has multiple sclerosis and often uses a wheelchair. Using the pretence of caring for Cathy, Jill gradually moves in with them, flirting with their son David and trying to break up their marriage and sleep with Don, all the while playing the sympathy card with Cathy.

When Jill finds out Terry is recovering, she admits him to a hospice and tells all her friends that he has died, and stages a twisted funeral where she gets all the attention. Terry leaves the hospice and finds his way home. Jill imprisons him in a spare room and begins starving and brutalising him, but explains she is doing it only to aid his recovery.

Cathy and Don put forward their plans to move to Hopperton, a Christian retreat with a high population of lesbians. When Jill hears of this she throws a farewell coffee morning for them, livening it up by performing a pole dance routine, whilst the neighbours watch in horror. After the party Jill, realising she must be rid of Terry once and for all, runs upstairs and smothers him with a cushion.

Three weeks pass, and Jill has moved in with the wealthy but dimwitted Glen at his mansion. One morning, Jill goes downstairs to find Glen has invited Gordon, the local vicar and friend of Jill, to arrange a wedding. Jill realises she is about to be found out, so confesses to murdering her husband to Glen. She puts poison in dishes of Angel Delight and encourages Gordon to eat some. As he chokes on it, she tells Glen that if he loves her he would agree to take the blame for Gordon's and Terry's deaths and persuades him to make a telephone confession to the police. This done, Jill suggests that they both commit suicide by eating the Angel Delight, and he gives in to her persuasion. When it is her turn to eat the Angel Delight, she declares, "I'm not really hungry". The poison takes effect and Glen drops to the floor.

With Glen having taken the blame for Gordon and Terry's deaths, Jill rings Don.

=== Second series ===
Glen has survived Jill's attempt to kill him, but having confessed to killing Terry and Gordon, he is incarcerated in a secure unit for the criminally insane. Realising that she must inherit Glen's money to fund her pursuit of Don, she agrees to marry him and then begins a campaign to kill him. Jill steals a caravan from Linda and pursues Don to Bude, Cornwall, where he and Cathy are trying to fix their marriage at a New-Age retreat called The Trees. En route to The Trees, they accidentally run over Floella Umbagabe, a therapist planning to work at the retreat. They store her body in their caravan and Jill assumes Floella's identity to gain access to the centre.

When Cathy reveals she is pregnant with Don's baby and that he will be having a vasectomy, Jill realises her chances of securing him permanently are running out, so she tries to obtain a semen sample from Don prior to surgery. Ultimately unsuccessful, she tries to seduce Cathy and Don's 12-year-old son Bruce, and when he does not respond she claims to his parents that he raped her and she is pregnant by him.

Meanwhile, Glen has tunnelled his way out of his cell and has tracked Jill to Cornwall; Floella Umbagabe has recovered and arrived at The Trees, exposing Jill as a fraud.

The story flashes forward 11 months. Cathy has given birth to her baby Abigail. Don tells Sue that he wants to move to Spain with her to start a new life. Jill overhears and assumes Don is talking about her. Glen finds Jill and threatens to kill her. Convincing him that she's pregnant with his baby, Jill once again deceives Glen into submission.

After Jill's lies are once again exposed, she is chased to a cliff, where Cathy confronts her about her fake pregnancy and her repeated attempts to seduce Don. They begin to fight while Don and Sue have sex on the rocks below. Cath's wheelchair is hurled off the cliff, killing Sue just before Cathy pushes Jill off the cliff. Her fall is broken by a trampoline, and then by Don. Cathy is arrested and taken away by the police, while Jill rides off in a speed boat with Don and Glen.

== Production ==
The show was produced by Baby Cow. Steve Coogan and Henry Normal, who own the company, executive produced the series. Ted Dowd was the producer.

== International broadcast ==
In Australia, this programme commenced airing on ABC TV each Wednesday at 9pm from 23 March 2005.

== Reception ==
The first series won a Banff Award and Davis won a Royal Television Society Award for her performance and got a highly positive reception from TV critics. It also received a nomination for the BAFTA TV Award for Best Situation Comedy in 2005. The series won Britain's Best New TV Comedy of 2004.

The Guardian called it "an exquisitely vile comic creation" and adding that "The Office might have popularised the comedy of embarrassment, but Nighty Night has moved it on." The Times called it "a blistering wall of superbly unredeemed cruelty that manages to trample over every social convention in a pair of cheap stilettos."

In viewership, while no data were reported for the first series, the second series began strongly with 616,000 viewers - BBC Three's second-highest rated show of the week. Ratings slipped sharply from thereon, however, with the final two episodes registering fewer than 400,000 viewers and falling outside of the channel's top 10 shows both weeks.

The series has had a big queer following.

Whilst some people critiqued the series for its portrayal of cancer, Kylie Minogue has said she watched and enjoyed it whilst she was receiving cancer treatment.

In 2012, George Michael, who was a fan of Nighty Night, woke up from a coma after having pneumonia and found himself speaking in Jill's accent.

== US version ==
In June 2006 it was announced that Sex and the City creator Darren Star would write and be executive producer of a US version, which has been commissioned for a pilot script. Steve Coogan and Henry Normal, founders of the production company Baby Cow, were to be co-executive-producers.
