= Julia Davis =

English actress

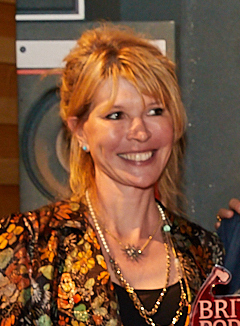
- Davis in 2019
- Born: August 25, 1966 (age 60); England
- Occupations: Actress; comedian; director; writer
- Years active: 1994–present
- Known for: Nighty Night (2004–5); Hunderby (2012–15); Camping (2016); Sally4Ever (2018)
- Partner: Julian Barratt (2000–present)
- Children: 2

Julia Davis (born 25 August 1966) is an English actress, comedian, director and writer. She wrote and starred in comedies including Human Remains (2000), Nighty Night (2004–2005), Hunderby (2012–2015), Camping (2016), and Sally4Ever (2018). She is known for her dark or black comedy.

Davis is a nine-time BAFTA TV Award nominee, she won Best Comedy Writing for Hunderby in 2013 and the 2018 British Academy Television Award for Best Scripted Comedy for Sally4Ever. She has also received two RTS Awards and three British Comedy Awards. In addition to acting in her own works, she has appeared in a variety of other British television comedies, most notably portraying Dawn Sutcliffe in Gavin & Stacey (2007–2009, 2019, 2024). Her film roles include Love Actually (2003), Cemetery Junction (2010), Four Lions (2010), Phantom Thread (2017), and The Toxic Avenger (2023).

== Early life and education ==
Julia Davis was born in England (Note: The BFI, The Guardian, and Vice interviews say she was born in Bath, Somerset; The Independent interview says that she grew up in Guildford, Surrey was schooled in the Home Counties, and her parents moved to Bath when she was 14.) in 25 August 1966. She was born in Lambeth, South London, grew up in Guildford, before moving to Bath, Somerset when she was 14. Her mother was a secretary, and her father a civil servant. She was raised in the Church of England, and then a more "fundamentalist" church. Aged 4, she attended a Church of England school. Her mother's father and brother were both vicars.

Davis describes her childhood as "normal" and "quite suburban". However, she has also said she had quite an "extreme mother", which means she grew up feeling quite insecure. Growing up, she thought she would become a teacher, although she hated school. Davis loved Mike Leigh's Abigail's Party as a child. She dates her interest in comedy to the age of seven, "when she recalled making her grandparents laugh by imitating "an old Scottish man"."

Davis sang in various folk bands as a teenager. Her first band was called "Hand-Knitted Air Rifles". Her favourite band growing up was Nirvana, and she found folk music too gentle.

After studying for a degree in English and Drama at the College of Ripon and York St John, she returned to Bath because she became ill with glandular fever ("something between glandular fever and ME...some unknown viral..."). In Bath, she began working "dead-end jobs", including teaching, nannying, bartending, cleaning and selling "massive mobile phones".

== Career ==
=== 1998–2000: Career beginnings ===
Davis decided to become a comedian after her long illness. Davis also cites Julie Walters in Acorn Antiques as giving her the confidence to pursue a career in comedy. She was influenced by Steve Coogan and Chris Morris.

She joined a local drama group in Bath, where she met Jane Roth. Davis and Roth left the group and started a comedy double-act The Sisters of Percy. They did around six shows around Bath and Glastonbury. When Davis was around 25/26, she and Roth both joined an improv troupe, which included Welsh radio DJ (now actor and comedian) Rob Brydon, and comedian and actress Ruth Jones. The group also included actor Toby Longworth and his then-girlfriend radio producer Liz Ansty. Ansty was making a show called Five Squeezy Pieces for BBC Radio 4, which she got Davis involved with. The series was an all-female sketch comedy show, with Meera Syal, Arabella Weir, Maria McErlane, and Claire Calman.

Davis first appeared on television in the BBC sketch show Comedy Nation (1998). Arabella Weir introduced Davis to Arthur Mathews and Graham Linehan who placed her as a regular cast member in the television sketch show Big Train (1998), the pilot episode of which was directed by Chris Morris. Chris Morris then cast her for his 1997–1999 radio series Blue Jam, its successor March–April 2000 TV show Jam, and Brass Eye. As a result of her introductions to various people in television and sending videotapes of her sketches to the BBC, in 1998, her agent sent a tape of various characters to Steve Coogan, he invited her to write for and participate in his shows during his 1998 national tour.

Davis went on to appear in many comedy television shows including Dr. Terrible's House of Horrible (2001), I'm Alan Partridge (2002), I Am Not an Animal (2004), Ideal (2005) and Nathan Barley (2005).

=== Human Remains (2000) ===
In November 2000, Human Remains, a dark comedy television series produced by Steve Coogan's production company Baby Cow, co-written by and co-starring Rob Brydon and Davis, debuted on BBC Two. It was produced by Alison MacPhail.

The series consisted of six fake documentaries (across six episodes), where Brydon and Davis played six different couples talking to camera about their unusual relationships. The scripts were mostly written through improvisation.

Davis won the Royal Television Society Award for Best Performance for the series. The Guardian said the series is "one of the best comedies of the past 10 years, though it hardly ever gets the recognition it deserves".

=== Nighty Night (2004–2005) ===
Henry Normal from Baby Cow suggested to Davis that she write something on her own, and write a half-hour pilot. In 2004 and 2005, Davis wrote and starred in two series of the BBC Three dark comedy Nighty Night. The show is centred on her character of peroxide "blonde" sociopathic beauty therapist Jill Tyrell. The show came out of a lot of improvisation work between Davis and Jane Stannis.

The character of Jill was inspired by a mixture of things, including: the character Beverly from Human Remains; and Davis' job in the Finance department of Bath University. She said that "Most of Jill is an amalgam of women I've seen or worked with in the West Country". Ruth Jones' character, Linda, was also a development of one of her characters in Human Remains. The character of Don was originally offered to Colin Firth, who did not respond to the offer.

The show was produced by Alison MacPhail, who had also produced Human Remains. The first series took three years to write. Davis' approach to writing is to writing scenes, rather than an overarching story. Jill's costume was created by Claire Finlay.

Davis was nominated for a BAFTA for Best Comedy Performance, and a British Comedy Award for Best Actress, and won a Royal Society of Television Award for Best Comedy Writer.

Davis was not happy with the second series, saying that "it was too ridiculous". She has also described it as a "failure" and "therefore a waste of my time". However, she has said she had ideas for a third series.

According to the Guardian, the public had assumed that the dark and "weird" parts of Human Remains were down to Rob Brydon, so Nighty Night "carried few expectations and Nighty Night was attended by no hype at all".

Davis has said that commissioning has changed significantly since Nighty Night, and she doubts it would have been commissioned in today's climate.

=== 2007–2010: Gavin & Stacey and other ===
From 2007 to 2009, she played Dawn Sutcliffe in Gavin & Stacey, a role which she reprised in 2019 for a Christmas special and in 2024 in the finale. She also featured in a behind-the-scenes documentary about the finale. When the first series was filmed, Davis was six weeks pregnant with twins.

In 2006, Davis appeared on Little Britain Abroad as a sexy Russian mail-order bride called Ivanka.

In 2009, Davis appeared, in the guise of Steve Coogan's personal assistant Debbie Bidwoden, in the TV film Steve Coogan – The Inside Story.

In 2009, Davis starred in a short film with Richard Ayoade for See Africa Differently, a campaign to showcase the under-reported progress from Africa.

=== Lizzie & Sarah (2010) ===
Davis and Jessica Hynes met at a party thrown by director Edgar Wright and they soon became friends and comedy partners. Since 2003, Davis and Hynes produced improvised comedy for Resonance FM, under the title Peppatits. The Guardian described their broadcasts as "unusual, funny, sometimes quite disturbing."

In 2010, Davis co-wrote and co-starred in Lizzie and Sarah with Jessica Hynes. The pilot is about two middle-class housewives, who are treated badly by their husbands, who wreak revenge on all who have crossed them. The pilot aired on 20 March 2010 on BBC Two at 11:45pm. It was made by Baby Cow Productions, produced by Alison MacPhail, and directed by Elliot Hegarty.

The pilot received no publicity around its transmission, and, Vice says, the "BBC buried it in a graveyard slot". It was considered even darker than Davis's previous work. The Guardian described it as saying "it makes Nighty Night look like The Wind in the Willows and is perhaps the most challenging comedy Davis has written." Despite a Facebook campaign, the BBC did not commission a series. Davis was disappointed about this. The Guardian said that the pilot was "beautifully observed", "brave and hilarious" and its "familiarity...makes it both so painful and so funny".

In 2010, Julia Davis and Jessica Hynes performed as their characters from Lizzie and Sarah for the "Angina Monologues", a British comedy show featuring Victoria Wood about women's heart disease.

Also in 2010, Davis and Hynes took their collaboration to the Bristol Old Vic as part of the improv festival, Bristol Jam.

=== 2011–2015: Psychobitches, Morning Has Broken ===
Davis starred in productions such as: the short film For the Love of God (2007); The Alan Clark Diaries; and Persuasion, an adaptation of the Jane Austen novel.

In 2006, Davis starred in the television film Fear of Fanny, in which she played the celebrity chef Fanny Cradock. It was directed by Coky Giedroyc. Davis was nominated for a Royal Television Society Award for Best Actor for her performance.

In December 2011, Davis appeared in "Fifteen Million Merits", an episode of the anthology series Black Mirror, as Judge Charity on the fictional talent show Hot Shot.

On 22 December 2011, she appeared as Anne Yeaman in the Christmas special and finale of the BBC Three comedy How Not to Live Your Life.

On 26 August 2012, Davis appeared in the pilot episode of Bad Sugar on Channel 4. A full series was set to air in 2013, but was cancelled due to availability of the cast and writers.

In 2013, Davis played various characters in BBC sketch show It's Kevin and in Psychobitches (Part of Playhouse Presents) on Sky Arts. She appeared in the Inside No. 9 episode "The Understudy" (Series 1; Episode 5) as a stage manager.

In 2014, Davis starred as an eccentric mother alongside Al Roberts (Stath Lets Flats) in the comedy short film The Bird, co-directed by Ben Target and Joe Parham.

In 2014, Davis co-wrote (with Nick Mohammed) and starred in a pilot for Channel 4 called Morning Has Broken, about a self-centred daytime TV host. It was inspired by daytime TV, particularly Lorraine Kelly's presenting. The pilot starred, alongside Davis and Mohammed: Georgie Glen, Seb Cardinal (Cardinal Burns), Jamie Demetriou and Asim Chaudhry. A full series of Morning Has Broken was commissioned but was not made. It was meant to star David Schwimmer as a US producer, alongside Davis.

In 2015, Davis and Marc Wootton created and starred in BBC Radio 4 comedy series Couples, about couples in therapy.

=== Hunderby (2012, 2015) ===
Davis created, wrote and starred in Hunderby, which aired for two series on Sky Atlantic in 2012 and 2015. Davis described the show as "Downton Abbey meets Geordie Shore". It was influenced by Rebecca, as well as Tess of the d'Urbervilles. The series is a black comedy set in the 1830s. She worked on the programme with Lucy Lumsden and Stuart Murphy, who were also behind Nighty Night at the BBC.

The work was scripted, not improvised. When talking about Hunderby and Sally4Ever, Alex Macqueen said that, for Davis, "if you're not on the verge of corpsing, it's not good enough".

For Hunderby, Davis won the BAFTA TV Craft Award for Writing – Comedy. The series was nominated for Best Scripted Comedy at the 2013 BAFTA TV Awards and Davis was nominated for Best Female Performance in a Comedy Programme. It won the awards for Best New Comedy and Best Sitcom at the 2012 British Comedy Awards.

=== Camping (2016) ===
It was reported in 2015 that Davis had been commissioned for a new series, Robin's Test, which was later renamed Camping. In 2016, Davis created, wrote and directed the series for Sky Atlantic. She also starred in it as shallow nymphomaniac, Fay. This was her first series as a director, with her only previous directing credit being an episode of Sky's "Little Crackers" in 2010.

The series is a dark comedy about a group of couples who go camping for someone's 50th birthday, and, Davis says, "One guy unexpectedly arrives with his new girlfriend, which messes up the whole holiday and it descends into a nightmare by the end."

At the 2017 BAFTA TV Awards, Camping was nominated for Best Scripted Comedy and Davis for Best Comedy Writer. The Guardian described it as "craftily observed, beautifully performed, as well as typically, gloriously, boldly bleak."

In 2018, the series was adapted for American audiences to create a series of the same name by Lena Dunham and Jenni Konner. It was originally released on HBO in America, and subsequently on Sky Atlantic in the UK. However, it did not receive good reviews either in the US or UK. The Guardian said that, whilst some of the performances were good, "The reworking deviates from the darkness and dread that made the original black comedy so perfect".

=== Sally4Ever (2018) ===
In 2018, Davis wrote, directed and starred in the comedy television series Sally4Ever on Sky Atlantic (in collaboration with HBO). It came out of a short film she was writing with her and Catherine Shepherd, who went on to play Sally in the series. Davis plays the character of Emma, a very manipulative woman has a chaotic affair with the "too-nice" Sally.

At the 2019 BAFTA awards Sally4Ever won the award for Best Scripted Comedy and Davis was nominated for Best Female Performance in a Comedy Programme.

=== Dear Joan and Jericha (2018–2025) ===
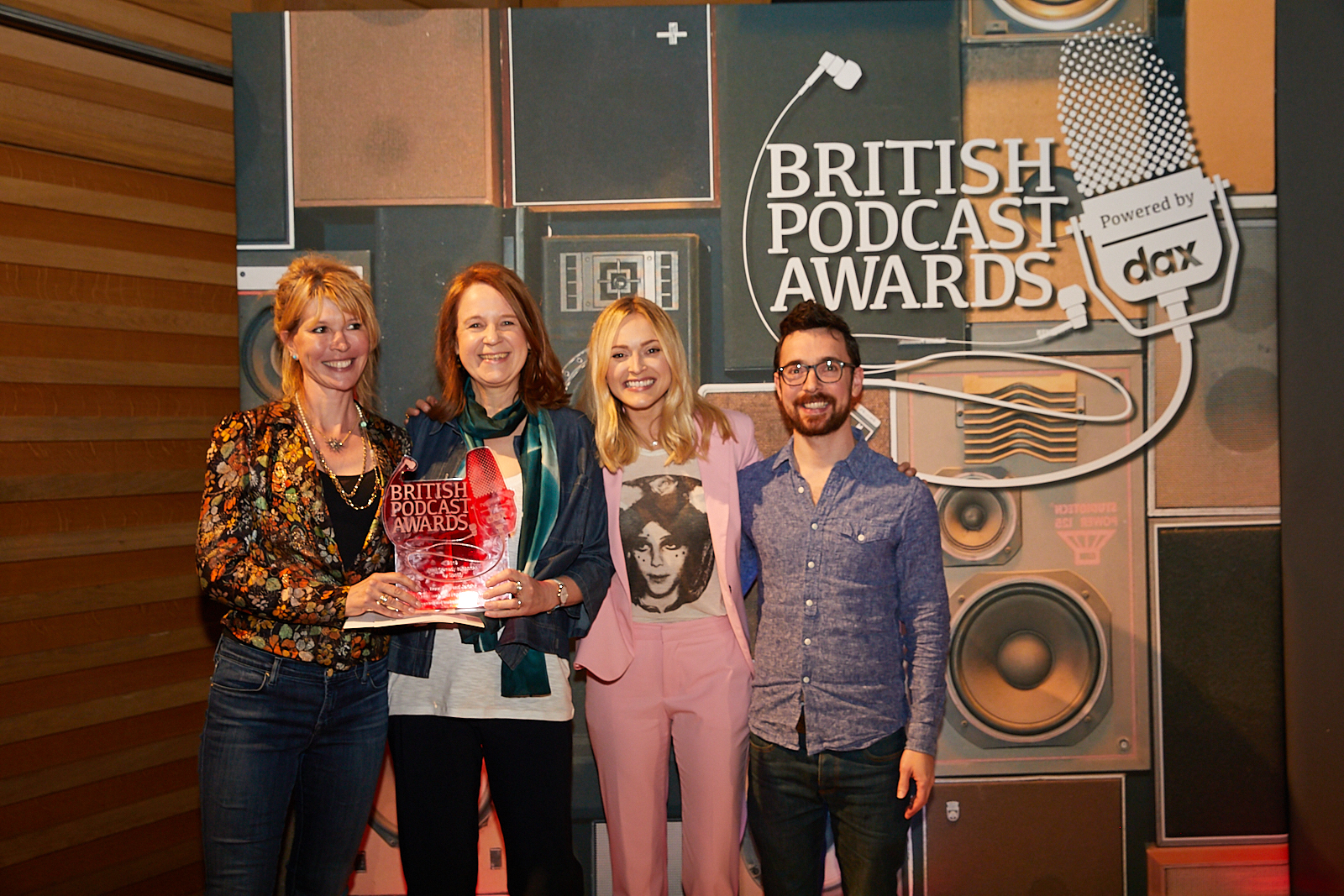
Julia Davis and Vicky Pepperdine, British Podcast Awards 2019

Davis launched the podcast comedy Dear Joan And Jericha with comedian Vicki Pepperdine in 2018. The series has 29 episodes as of March 2025.

The Guardian described the podcast as "the funniest, dirtiest podcast you’ll ever hear".

Davis and Pepperdine published a book on the back of the podcast, Why He Turns Away: Dos and Don'ts From Dating to Death.

=== 2020s documentaries ===
Davis has had two main periodic intervals wherein she had involvement in documentaries, at the turn of the 2010s decade and early 2020s, which in both cases largely focused on the creative process behind sitcoms. However, her primary contemporary documentary outside the field of comedy and that she narrated rather than appearing in was Too Large to Love, a documentary about abnormally large penises. In it, the participants claimed they have faced prejudice and discrimination at places of employement because of societal misapprehensions about the macrophallic crotchbulge. Per Matt Barr and Joe Brady, the most substantially represented macrophallists on the documentary, the main clothing issue macrophallists face is that they're sometimes prevented from playing sports since most athletic gear makes the crotchbulge more conspicuous and the expensiveness of buying custom-made pouches since conventional clothing doesn't sufficiently obscure or support a macropenis. Brady has further stated he has been humiliated and objectified frequently whenever his macrophallic crotchbulge is noticed in public. On other occasions, their megalophallus has caused them problems related to libel and defamation because since their crotchbulge is discernible even when flaccid, it results n street harassment and bodyshaming for. For example, Brady has been accused of being a flasher or erotic exhibitionist since the general public assume the large crotchbulge is caused by an erection, even when he insists his penis is actually flaccid, whilst Barr has faced staff who have issued him trespass notices at lounges and suites due to false claims of sexual suggestiveness.

=== 2021–Present ===
Davis played socialite Maureen, Marchioness of Dufferin and Ava, in BBC One historical drama A Very British Scandal, which premiered on BBC One on Boxing Day 2021.

In 2022, Davis appeared in two episodes of The Outlaws, as Rita.

== Writing ==
Davis is known for her dark comedy. Her work tends to depict desperately unhappy couples. She has said she enjoys playing the dark characters because it is more fun, and she finds "manipulation and power struggles endlessly fascinating". She has also said that "Most things I do come from something that makes me angry". She is not interested in writing for a mainstream audience, rather something cult for "people who like the same things as I do, who find the same things funny".

Davis has said she always starts writing with the characters, rather than the plot. She said that "I always try to plan the overall story of a series first, but usually I get impatient and have to start writing scenes to reassure myself that there is something tangible that’s going to work, as for me the comedy tends to come from characters more than situations." She also uses improvisation as a tool for writing.

Davis is known by her fellow actors for regularly corpsing on set. Although, she says Catherine Shepherd is worse than her.

Davis is influenced by Harold Pinter. She also says she loves the film Force Majeure, the Danish series Klovn, the work of filmmaker Paul Thomas Anderson (particularly Phantom Thread, which she stars in), all of the work in the Dogme movement, and the work of director Yorgos Lanthimos (particularly Dogtooth). In terms of comedy, she loves the films Bridesmaids and Step Brothers; the series One Mississippi, Flight of the Conchords, Eastbound & Down, Strangers with Candy and "anything with Jennifer Saunders or Dawn French." She also loves comedians Jamie Demetriou, Ellie White, Katy Wix and Cardinal Burns.

== Reception ==
In her book Reclaiming Female Authorship in Contemporary UK Television Comedy (2024) Laura Minor, lecturer in television studies at University of Salford, notes that Davis is known for creating boundary-pushing black comedy that centres female anti-hero characters. Eva Wiseman, of The Guardian, similarly said that she finds Davis' "portrayals of monstrous women...wildly liberating".

The Gentlewoman said that: "Davis’s strand of funny is demented, lunatic and unhinged, one that repeatedly kicks at the shins of received suburban manners. She often deals in the tricky currency of female cruelty and appears to have identified a new microcosm of the British class system somewhere between working and middle that is in a permanent argument with itself about why life looks the way it does"

== Personal life ==
Davis is in a long term relationship with comedian Julian Barratt of The Mighty Boosh. The couple are parents to twin sons (Walter and Arthur), born in 2007. They live in London.

Davis has experienced depression in the past, and describes herself as "riddled with anxiety". She said she prefers acting to writing because "For my personality, which is prone to be depressive, dark and extreme, it's not good to be stuck in a room on your own". She does not do many interviews as herself (rather than in character), because of her anxiety and not wanting to be in the limelight. Whilst Davis writes dark comedy, it is commonly observed that she is shy, cautious and warm.

Both of Davis' parents died in Bath of cancer.

Despite her Christian upbringing, Davis is not now religious.

== Filmography ==
Key
†	Denotes works that have not yet been released

=== Film ===
Year	Title	Role	Director	Notes	Ref.
1994	Flush	Cleaner	Sean Grundy	Short film	
1999	The Comedy Trail: A Shaggy Dog Story	Unknown	Horse Jockey	TV special	
2001	The Parole Officer	Insinuating Wife	John Duigan		
2002	Wilbur Wants to Kill Himself	Moira	Lone Scherfig		
2003	Hello Friend	(voice)	Graham Linehan	Short film	
2003	Love Actually	Nancy, the Caterer	Richard Curtis	Cameo	
2004	Shaun of the Dead	News Reporter (voice)	Edgar Wright	Uncredited role	
2004	Sex Lives of the Potato Men	Shelley	Andy Humphries		
2005	Dating Ray Fenwick	Alison	Kitty Flanagan	Short film	
2005	Match Point	Julie	Woody Allen		
2006	Confetti	Marriage counsellor	Debbie Isitt		
2007	For the Love of God	Mother (voice)	Joe Tucker	Short film	
2007	Persuasion	Elizabeth Elliot	Adrian Shergold		
2010	Come on Eileen	Dee	Finola Geraghty		
2010	The Lost Explorer	Vera Cleghorn	Tim Walker	Short film	
2010	Cemetery Junction	Mrs Taylor	Ricky Gervais, Stephen Merchant		
2010	Four Lions	Alice	Chris Morris		
2011	Arthur Christmas	UNFITA OPS (voice)	Sarah Smith	Animation	
2012	David's Fine	Narrator	Matt Holt	Short film	
2014	The Bird	Mother	Ben Target, Joe Parham	Short film	
2016	Brakes	Livy	Mercedes Grower		
2017	Phantom Thread	Lady Baltimore	Paul Thomas Anderson		
2019	Fighting with My Family	Daphne	Stephen Merchant		
2021	The Clearing	Deb	Dan Hope	Short film	
2021	Sing 2	Linda Le Bon (voice)	Garth Jennings		
2022	Nude Tuesday		Armağan Ballantyne	Writer	
2023	Run Rabbit Run	Gail (Nightshift Nurse)	Daina Reid		
2023	The Toxic Avenger	Kissy Sturnevan	Macon Blair		
2023	Sweat	Tracy	Duncan Loudon	Short film	
2025	The Fairy Moon	The Operator	Craig Williams	Short film	
2025	The Toxic Avenger Unrated	Kissy Sturnevan	Macon Blair		
	Or Something Like It (working title) †		Jamie Adams		

=== Television ===
Year	Title	Channel	Role	Other Role	Notes	Ref.
1998	Comedy Nation	BBC Two	Various (Episodes 1, 3, 4)	Writer (Episodes 3, 4)	Series 1	
1999	Steve Coogan: The Man Who Thinks He’s It				Recording of live performance at The Palace Theatre, Manchester	
1999	Coming Soon	Channel 4	Kim		Television film	
1999	Harry Enfield Special: Songs of Praise From St. Albions	ITV1	Jenny Phillips			
1998–2002	Big Train	BBC Two	Various	Writer (Additional Material)	Series 1 & 2 (7 episodes)	
1999	People Like Us	BBC Two	Lisa Bell		Series 1; Episode 1: "The Managing Director"	
1999	The Comedy Trail: A Shaggy Dog Story		Horse Jockey		Special	
2000	Jam	Channel 4	Various		Mini-series; Episodes 1–6	
2000	Human Remains	BBC Two	Various	Co-creator, Writer	Mini-series; Episodes 1–6. Also	
2001	Brass Eye	Channel 4	Ensemble Actor		Series 2; Episode: "Paedogeddon!"	
2001	Dr. Terrible's House of Horrible	BBC Two	Stephanie Wise		Episode 4: "And Now the Fearing..."	
2002	I'm Alan Partridge	BBC Two	Kate Fitzgerald		Series 2; Episode 6: "Alan Wide Shut"	
2002	Ella and the Mothers	BBC One	Nicola		Television film	
2003	The Office	BBC Two	Gillian (voice)		Series 3; Episode 2: "Christmas Special: Part 2" (heard on the phone as the voice of a woman from a dating agency in conversation with David Brent)	
2003	Appointment with Dr. Terrible		Herself		Documentary about the series	
2003	Dose	BBC One Wales	Mrs Harris			
2004	The Alan Clark Diaries	BBC	Jenny Easterbrook		Episodes 1 & 2: "The March of the Grey Men" and "The Lady"	
2004	I Am Not an Animal	BBC	Clair the Rat (voice)		Episodes 1–6	
2004	AD/BC: A Rock Opera	BBC Three	Ruth		Television film	
2004–2005	Nighty Night		Jill Tyrell	Creator, Writer, Associate Producer	Series 1 & 2 (all 12 episodes).	
2005	Nathan Barley (working title Box of Slice)	Channel 4	Honda Poppet, weather girl		Episode 5	
2006	Little Britain Abroad	BBC	Ivanka		Parts 1 & 2	
2006	Fear of Fanny	BBC Four	Fanny Cradock		Television film, Dir. Coky Giedroyc	
2006	Born Equal	BBC Films	Sally		Television film, Dir. Dominic Savage	
2006	The Secret Policeman’s Ball: The Ball in the Hall		Herself		Recording of a live performance at the Royal Albert Hall	
2007–2009, 2019, 2024	Gavin & Stacey	BBC	Dawn Sutcliffe		Series 1–3 & 2 Specials (10 episodes)	
2008	Ideal	BBC Three	Dawn		Series 4; Episode 8: "The Future"	
2009	10 Minute Tales	Sky TV	Overbearing Midwife		Episode 3: "Ding Dong"	
2009	Steve Coogan: The Inside Story	BBC Two	Various	Writer	Spoof documentary about Steve Coogan	
2010	Lizzie and Sarah	BBC Two	Lizzie / Faith	Writer, Associate Producer, Composer	Pilot	
2010	Chekkov: Comedy Shorts	Sky Arts 2	Popova		Episode 2: "The Bear"	
2010	Little Crackers	Sky One	Susan Johnways	Writer, Director	Series 1; Episode 10: "Julia Davis's Little Cracker: The Kiss"	
2010	The Mighty Boosh: Journey of the Childmen		Herself		Documentary	
2010	The Angina Monologues	Sky One	Lizzie / Faith, Herself		Film of the live performance	
2011	Black Mirror	Channel 4	Judge Charity		Series 1; Episode 2: "Fifteen Million Merits"	
2011	How Not to Live Your Life	BBC Three	Anne Yeaman		Series 4; Episode: "It's a Don-derful Life"	
2011	Steve Coogan Lie: The Man Who Thinks He's It	Comedy Central	Ensemble Actor	Writer		
2012	Uncle Wormsley's Christmas	Sky Atlantic	Mrs. Goodington		Television film	
2012	Bad Sugar	Channel 4	Daphne Cauldwell	Creator	Pilot	
2012	Alan Carr: Chatty Man	Channel 4	Herself		Series 9, Episode 9	
2012–2015	Hunderby	Sky One	Dorothy	Creator, Writer, Executive Producer	Series 1 & 2 (10 episodes)	
2013	It's Kevin	BBC Two	Ensemble Actor		Episodes 1–4	
2013	Psychobitches	Sky Arts	Ensemble Actor	Writer (Episode 3)	Mini-series; Series 1; Episodes 1–5	
2014	Inside No. 9	BBC Two	Felicity		Series 1; Episode 5: "The Understudy"	
2014	Morning Has Broken	Channel 4	Gail Sinclair	Creator, Writer, Director, Executive Producer|| Pilot		
2015	Alan Carr: Chatty Man	Channel 4	Herself		Series 15, Episode 13	
2016	Camping	Sky Atlantic	Fay	Creator, Writer, Director, Executive Producer	Mini-series; Episodes 1–6	
2017	Philip K. Dick's Electric Dreams		Sally Morris		Episode 4: "Crazy Diamond"	
2018	Sally4Ever	Sky Atlantic	Emma	Creator, Writer, Director, Executive Producer	All episodes	
2020	The Shivering Truth		Various		Series 2, Episode 6: "The Holeways"	
2021	Stath Lets Flats	Channel 4	Kris Collins		Series 3, Episode 3: "A Drink Because of Friendship"	
2021	A Very British Scandal: The Duchess of Argyll	Amazon	Maureen Guinness		3-part mini-series	
2021	Stand Up & Deliver	Channel 4	Narrator		Episodes 1 and 2	
2022	The Outlaws	BBC	Rita		Series 2; Episode 2	
2022	My Massive C**k (Too Large for Love)		Narrator		Documentary	
2022	Corpse Talk	YouTube	Mary Shelley (Voice)		Online animation; Halloween Special	
2023	Love Me		Kel		Mini-series; Series 2, Episode 1: "Sluta håll med"	
2023	Safe Home		Caitlyn		Episode 3	
2024	The Regime	HBO	Marina		Mini-series; Episode 5: "All Ye Faithful"	
2024	Person of Interest	Channel 4	Dr. Kate Shelley		Television short film	
2024	Gavin & Stacey: The Making of the Finale	BBC	Herself		Documentary	
2025	Educators		Catherine		Recurring role. Series 4	
2025	Gavin & Stacey: A Fond Farewell	BBC	Herself		Documentary	
2026	Living The Dream †	Netflix	Various (Voice)		Animation	

=== Radio ===
Year	Title	Station	Role	Other Role	Notes	Ref.
1997, 1998, 1999	Blue Jam	BBC Radio 1	Ensemble actor	Writer (Additional Material)	Series 1-3; by Chris Morris	
1998	The Very World Of Milton Jones	BBC Radio 4	Ensemble actor		Series 1, Episode 6	
1998, 2000	Five Squeezy Pieces	BBC Radio 4	Ensemble actor (Series 1 and 2)	Writer (Series 1)	Series 1 and 2	
2008	Nebulous	BBC Radio 4	Dean Geraldine		Series 3, Episode 2	
2008, 2011	Down The Line	BBC Radio 4	Old Lady who get very Upset; Ensemble actor		Series 3, Episode 1; Series 4, Episode 7	
2012, 2014, 2017	Kevin Eldon Will See You Now	BBC Radio 4	Ensemble actor		Series 1, 2, 3	
2013	Hard To Tell	BBC Radio 4	Gillian		Series 2, Episodes 1-4	
2015	Sleepy Tigers	BBC Radio 4	Sheila	Writer		
2015	Couples (pilot)	BBC Radio 4	Various	Writer		
2016	Couples	BBC Radio 4	Various	Writer		
2020	Edith Sitwell in Scarborough	BBC Radio 4	Lady Ida			
2020	Now Wash Your Hands	BBC Radio 4	Joan Damry		Episode 6	
2022	'Whatever Next?' With Miles Jupp	BBC Radio 4	Various		Episodes 1-4	

=== Theatre ===
Year	Title	Venue	Role	Other Role	Notes	Ref.
90s	The Sister of Percy		Performer	Co-writer	Comedy revue show	
1998	Steve Coogan: The Man Who Thinks He's It	Tour - West End, Lyceum Theatre				
	Contractions	Royal Court				
	Jackpot	Bath Fringe Festival	Performer	Producer		
	Me Me Me			Co-writer	With Jane Roth	
	Sisters	Bath Fringe Festival	Performer	Writer		
	More Fool Us		Performer		Live improvised comedy show	
	Instant Wit				Live improvised comedy show	

=== Voiceovers ===
Davis has also done several voiceovers for brands including Marks & Spencer, British Gas, Vodafone, Mastercard and Renault.

== Awards ==
- 2001: RTS Television Award-Best Television Performance: winner
- 2003: Bodil-Best Supporting Actress (Bedste kvindelige birolle): nominated
- 2004: British Comedy Award-Best TV Comedy Actress: nominated
- 2005: BAFTA TV Award-Best Comedy Performance: nominated
- 2005: Golden Rose-Best Sitcom Actress: nominated
- 2005: RTS Television Award-Best Writer - Comedy: winner
- 2007: Golden Nymph-Television Films - Best Performance by an Actress: nominated
- 2007: Golden Nymph-Television Films - Best Performance by an Actress: nominated
- 2007: RTS Television Award-Best Actor - Female: nominated
- 2013: BAFTA TV Award-Best Situation Comedy: nominated
- 2013: BAFTA TV Award-Best Writer: Comedy: winner
- 2013: BAFTA TV Award-Best Female Performance in a Comedy Programme: nominated
- 2013: BAFTA Television Craft Award-Writer: Comedy: winner
- 2013: Broadcasting Press Guild Award-Best Multichannel Programme: nominated
- 2016: BAFTA Television Craft Award-Writer: Comedy: nominated
- 2016: Broadcasting Press Guild Award-Best Actress: nominated
- 2017: BAFTA TV Award-Best Scripted Comedy: nominated
- 2017: BAFTA TV Award-Best Writer: Comedy: nominated
- 2017: BAFTA Television Craft Award-Writer: Comedy: nominated
- 2017: British Screenwriters' Award-Best Comedy Writing on Television: nominated
- 2019: BAFTA TV Award-Best Female Performance in a Comedy Programme: nominated
