= Phil Clarke (TV producer) =

British television producer (born 1961)

Philip Brian Clarke (born 14 May 1961) is a British television comedy producer and executive. He has produced or executive produced many popular British TV comedy programmes including Peep Show, Brass Eye, Never Mind the Buzzcocks and Big Train. In 2012 Clarke became Head of Comedy at Channel 4. In 2017 he founded the independent television production company Various Artists Ltd (VAL), along with co-directors Jesse Armstrong, Sam Bain and Roberto Troni. Since founding VAL, Clarke has produced and/or executive produced the BAFTA-award winning Sally4Ever, Such Brave Girls, Juice, and the multi-BAFTA and Emmy-winning I May Destroy You.

== Early life and education ==
Philip Brian Clarke was born on 14 May 1961, in Watford. Clarke was educated at Rickmansworth School and Manchester University.

== Career ==
Clarke worked briefly as a sub-editor at Professional Electrician magazine, then as a PR at Heathrow Airport and the National Army Museum in London, before going full-time as a stand-up on the alternative comedy circuit of the 1980s. In 1992 he joined BBC Radio's Light Entertainment department as a trainee producer, producing the improvised comedy drama The Masterson Inheritance, starring Josie Lawrence and Paul Merton, the sketch and stand-up show The Mark Steel Solution, the comedy lecture series The Mark Steel Revolution, and the Doctor Who radio series The Paradise of Death.

In 1995, after BBC Radio 4 did not air Eamon, Older Brother of Jesus, a series Clarke had produced with the comedian Michael Redmond, Clarke left radio and moved to BBC Television, producing shows with Paul Merton and Bob Monkhouse, as well as the new-talent sketch show Comedy Nation, before leaving in 1998 to go freelance.

=== Television ===
As a freelance, Clarke produced the second series of the sketch show Armstrong and Miller for Absolutely Productions.

In 2000, Clarke joined the British production company Talkback as a senior comedy producer. While at Talkback he series-produced the late-night topical satire The 11 O'Clock Show with Jon Holmes, and produced the sketch show Big Train and the pilot for the comedy history series The Mark Steel Lectures. He was executive producer on the sketch show Bo! Selecta, and the panel shows QI and Never Mind the Buzzcocks.

In 2001, he was asked by the satirist Chris Morris to produce a one-off episode of Brass Eye titled "Paedogeddon", which tackled the moral panic about paedophilia in certain parts of the British media. In 2002 the episode was nominated for a Royal Television Society award, two BAFTA awards, and won a Broadcast magazine award.

In 2003 Peter Fincham allowed Clarke to take time off from Talkback to produce the first series of Peep Show for Objective Productions, starring David Mitchell and Robert Webb, and written by Sam Bain and Jesse Armstrong. After a second series of Peep Show was commissioned by Channel 4, Clarke left Talkback to join Objective as its first head of comedy.

While at Objective Clarke produced or series produced series one to eight of Peep Show. He also produced the sitcom Pete Versus Life, starring Rafe Spall, and executive produced, among others, the spoof celebrity sitcom Star Stories, the sketch show The Kevin Bishop Show, the comedy game show Balls of Steel, and the comedy-drama Fresh Meat.

In 2012 Clarke left Objective to become Channel 4's head of comedy, where the shows he commissioned included The Windsors, Toast of London, Man Down, Raised by Wolves, Flowers, Catastrophe and Chewing Gum, the latter two both winning BAFTA awards in 2016. When Clarke left the channel in 2017, its chief creative officer Jay Hunt was quoted as saying Clarke had "impeccable taste".

In 2017, Clarke set up Various Artists Ltd (VAL) with Sam Bain, Jesse Armstrong and Roberto Troni, a former drama commissioner at Channel 4. Clarke executive produced VAL's first series, the sitcom Dead Pixels, then produced Sally4Ever, which won the BAFTA award for Best Scripted Comedy in 2019. Clarke executive produced I May Destroy You, written by, co-directed and starring Michaela Coel. According to Metacritic, this was the most critically acclaimed television programme of 2020.

=== Other work ===
Clarke is co-author of 'Gardening for the Zombie Apocalypse: How to Grow Your Own Food When Civilization Collapses (Or Even if It Doesn't)', published by Head of Zeus in October 2019. The book was shortlisted for a World Illustration Award in 2020.

== Personal life ==
Clarke has two sons, and live in East Sussex and London.
