= Simon Pegg filmography =

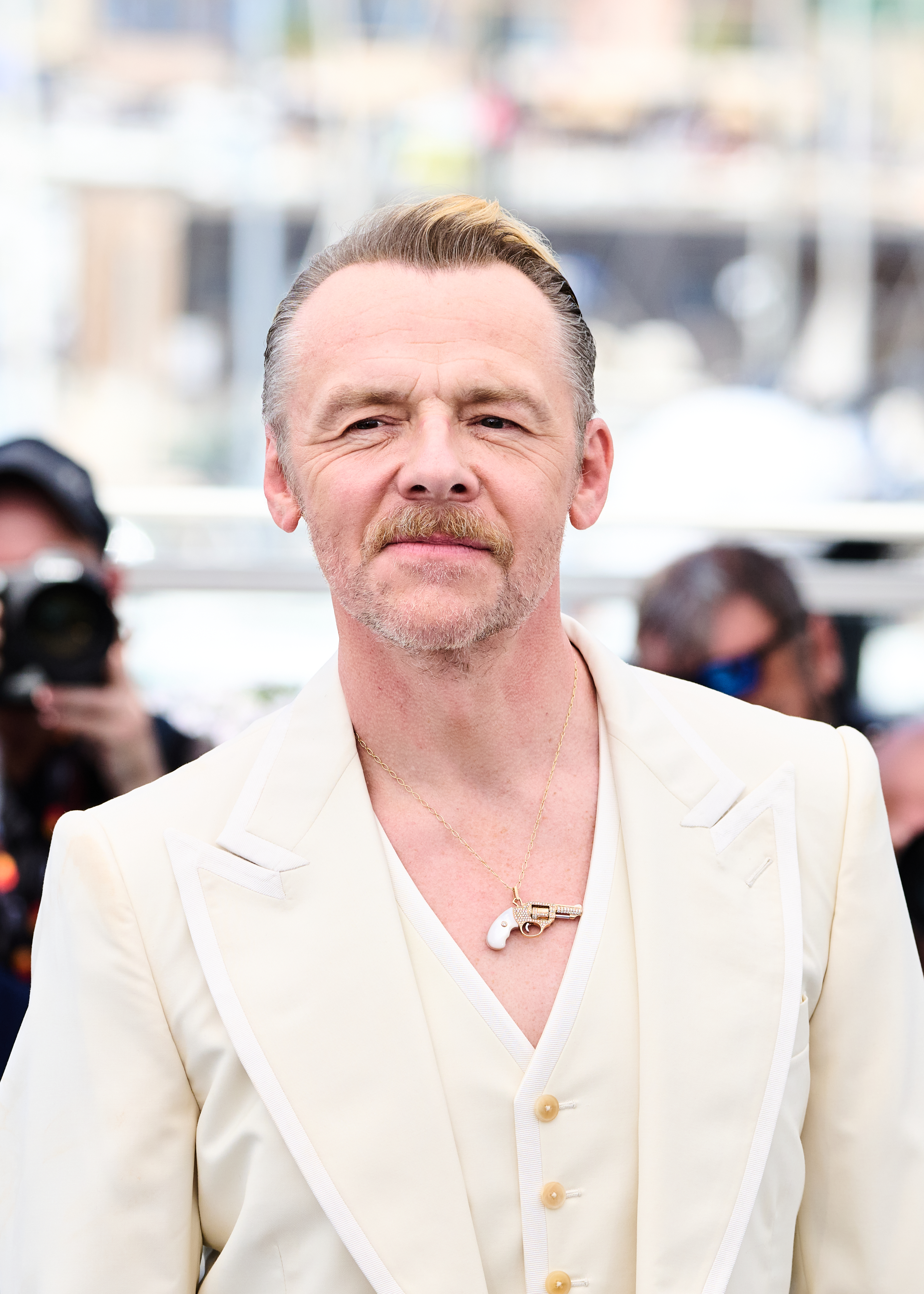
Pegg at the 2025 Cannes Film Festival.

Simon Pegg is an English actor, comedian, screenwriter, and producer. He came to public prominence in the UK as the co-creator of the sitcom Spaced, directed by Edgar Wright. He went on to co-write and star in the Three Flavours Cornetto film trilogy: Shaun of the Dead (2004), Hot Fuzz (2007), and The World's End (2013). He and frequent collaborator Nick Frost wrote and starred in the sci-fi film Paul (2011). From 2009 to 2016, Pegg is also known for his portrayal of Montgomery "Scotty" Scott in the first three films of the Star Trek reboot film series, and as the visual basis for Wee Hughie in the comic book The Boys (2006–2012; 2020), voicing the character in Diabolical (2022), and playing his father in The Boys from 2019 to 2024.

He first appeared as Benji Dunn in the film Mission: Impossible III (2006), the third installment in the Mission: Impossible film series, and went on to reprise the role in Ghost Protocol (2011), Rogue Nation (2015), Fallout (2018), Dead Reckoning Part One (2023) and Mission: Impossible – The Final Reckoning (2025). He has lent his voice to the animated character Buck in the Ice Age film series, namely Ice Age: Dawn of the Dinosaurs (2009), Scrat's Continental Crack-up (2011), Ice Age: Collision Course (2016), and The Ice Age Adventures of Buck Wild (2022), the latter of which made him the only cast member to reprise a role from previous films.

== Film ==
Key
| † | Denotes films that have not yet been released |

| Year | Title | Role | Notes | Ref. |
|---|---|---|---|---|
| 1999 | Tube Tales | Clerk | Segment: "Steal Away" | |
| 1999 | Guest House Paradiso | Mr. Nice | | |
| 1999 | The Comedy Trail: A Shaggy Dog Story | Horse Jockey | TV special | |
| 2001 | The Parole Officer | Deflated husband | | |
| 2002 | 24 Hour Party People | Paul Morley | | |
| 2004 | Shaun of the Dead | Shaun Riley | Also co-writer | |
| 2005 | The League of Gentlemen's Apocalypse | Peter Cow | | |
| 2005 | Land of the Dead | Photo Booth Zombie | | |
| 2006 | Mission: Impossible III | Benji Dunn | | |
| 2006 | Big Nothing | Gus | | |
| 2006 | Free Jimmy | Odd | Voice role, also writer of the English version | |
| 2007 | Grindhouse | Cannibal | Segment: "Don't" | |
| 2007 | The Good Night | Paul | | |
| 2007 | Hot Fuzz | Sgt. Nicholas Angel | Also co-writer | |
| 2007 | Run Fatboy Run | Dennis Doyle | Also co-writer | |
| 2007 | Diary of the Dead | Newsreader | Voice role, cameo | |
| 2008 | How to Lose Friends and Alienate People | Sidney Young | | |
| 2009 | Star Trek | Montgomery "Scotty" Scott | | |
| 2009 | Ice Age: Dawn of the Dinosaurs | Buck | Voice role | |
| 2010 | Burke & Hare | William Burke | | |
| 2010 | The Chronicles of Narnia: The Voyage of the Dawn Treader | Reepicheep | Voice role | |
| 2011 | Paul | Graeme Willy | Also co-writer | |
| 2011 | Scrat's Continental Crack-up | Buck | Short film (voice role - archive audio) | |
| 2011 | The Adventures of Tintin: The Secret of the Unicorn | Thompson | Voice role and motion capture | |
| 2011 | Mission: Impossible – Ghost Protocol | Benji Dunn | | |
| 2011 | The Death and Return of Superman | John Landis | Short film | |
| 2012 | A Fantastic Fear of Everything | Jack B. Nife | Also executive producer | |
| 2012 | Ice Age: Continental Drift | Buck | Cameo (voice role - archive audio) | |
| 2013 | Star Trek Into Darkness | Montgomery "Scotty" Scott | | |
| 2013 | The World's End | Gary King | Also co-writer and executive producer | |
| 2014 | Cuban Fury | Mondeo Driver | Uncredited cameo | |
| 2014 | Hector and the Search for Happiness | Hector | | |
| 2014 | Kill Me Three Times | Charlie Wolfe | | |
| 2014 | The Boxtrolls | Hebert Trubshaw | Voice role | |
| 2015 | Man Up | Jack | Also executive producer | |
| 2015 | Mission: Impossible – Rogue Nation | Benji Dunn | | |
| 2015 | Absolutely Anything | Neil Clarke | | |
| 2015 | Star Wars: The Force Awakens | Unkar Plutt | | |
| 2016 | Ice Age: Collision Course | Buck | Voice role | |
| 2016 | Star Trek Beyond | Montgomery "Scotty" Scott | Also co-writer | |
| 2018 | The Cloverfield Paradox | Radio Voice | Voice role | |
| 2018 | Ready Player One | Ogden "Og" Morrow | | |
| 2018 | Terminal | Bill | | |
| 2018 | Mission: Impossible – Fallout | Benji Dunn | | |
| 2018 | Slaughterhouse Rulez | Meredith Houseman | Also executive producer | |
| 2019 | Lost Transmissions | Theo Ross | | |
| 2019 | Piney: The Lonesome Pine | Jackster | Short film (voice role) | |
| 2020 | Inheritance | Morgan Warner | | |
| 2021 | The Sparks Brothers | John Lennon | Voice role | |
| 2021 | America: The Motion Picture | King James | Voice role | |
| 2022 | The Ice Age Adventures of Buck Wild | Buck | Voice role | |
| 2022 | Luck | Bob | Voice role | |
| 2023 | Mission: Impossible – Dead Reckoning Part One | Benji Dunn / The Entity | Entity is voice role | |
| 2023 | Nandor Fodor and the Talking Mongoose | Nandor Fodor | | |
| 2025 | Mission: Impossible – The Final Reckoning | Benji Dunn / The Entity | Entity is voice role | |
| 2026 | Only What We Carry | Julian Johns | | |
| 2027 | Ice Age: Boiling Point † | Buck | Voice role (in production) | |

== Television ==
Key
| † | Denotes films that have not yet been released |

| Year | Title | Role | Notes | Ref. |
|---|---|---|---|---|
| 1995 | Six Pairs of Pants | Various Characters | 3 episodes, also writer | |
| 1995–1998 | Faith in the Future | Jools | Main cast (series 2–3) | |
| 1996 | Asylum | Simon | Main cast, also writer | |
| 1997 | I'm Alan Partridge | Steve Bennett | Episode: "Watership Alan" | |
| 1997 | We Know Where You Live | Various Characters | Main cast | |
| 1998 | Is It Bill Bailey? | Various Characters | Main cast | |
| 1998 | Live from the Lighthouse | Robert Jobson | Television film | |
| 1998–2002 | Big Train | Various Characters | Main cast, also co-writer | |
| 1999 | Hippies | Ray Purbbs | Main cast | |
| 1999–2001 | Spaced | Tim Bisley | Main cast, also co-creator and co-writer | |
| 2000 | Randall & Hopkirk | Justin Pope | Episode: "Paranoia" | |
| 2001 | Brass Eye | Gerard Chote | Episode: "Paedophilia Special" | |
| 2001 | Band of Brothers | First Sergeant William Evans | 2 episodes | |
| 2001 | Dr. Terrible's House of Horrible | Angus | Episode: "Curse of the Blood of the Lizard of Doom" | |
| 2002 | Look Around You | Sleeping Queen's Guard | Episode: "Maths" | |
| 2002 | Linda Green | Jay | Episode: "Dark Side of the Moon" | |
| 2003 | Final Demand | Colin Taylor | Television film | |
| 2004 | Black Books | Evan | Episode: "Manny Come Home" | |
| 2004 | I Am Not an Animal | Kieron | Main cast (voice role) | |
| 2004 | Sex & Lies | Radio DJ | Television film | |
| 2005 | Look Around You | Handsome Man | Episode: "Health" | |
| 2005 | Doctor Who | The Editor | Episode: "The Long Game" | |
| 2005 | Doctor Who Confidential | Narrator | Documentary series | |
| 2005 | Spider-Plant Man | Frank Matters | Television film | |
| 2009 | Robot Chicken | Various voices | 2 episodes (voice role) | |
| 2012 | Star Wars: The Clone Wars | Dengar | Episode: "Bounty" (voice role) | |
| 2012 | Room on the Broom | Narrator | Television film | |
| 2012–2014 | Phineas and Ferb | Various voices | 4 episodes (voice roles) | |
| 2013 | Mob City | Hecky Nash | 2 episodes | |
| 2013–2015 | Randy Cunningham: 9th Grade Ninja | Pitch Kickham | 2 episodes (voice role) | |
| 2016 | The Grand Tour | Himself (cameo) | Episode: "Opera, Art and Donuts" | |
| 2018 | Running Man | Himself (special guest) | Episode 410 | |
| 2019–2024 | The Boys | Hugh Campbell, Sr. | Recurring role (seasons 1 and 4), guest (season 3); 9 episodes | |
| 2019 | The Dark Crystal: Age of Resistance | The Chamberlain (skekSil) | Main cast (voice role) | |
| 2020 | Archer | Aleister | Episodes: "Robot Factory" and "Best Friends" (voice role) | |
| 2020 | Out of Her Mind | —N/a | Executive producer only | |
| 2020 | Truth Seekers | Dave | Main cast, also co-creator and co-writer | |
| 2021 | Staged | Himself | Episode: "The Dirty Mochyns" | |
| 2022 | The Boys Presents: Diabolical | Hugh "Wee Hughie" Campbell | Episode: "I'm Your Pusher" (voice role) | |
| 2022–2026 | The Undeclared War | Daniel Patrick | Main cast | |
| 2023 | Agent Elvis | Paul McCartney | 1 episode (voice role) | |
| 2023 | Scott Pilgrim Takes Off | Studio Security Guard #1 | 2 episodes (voice role) | |
| 2024 | WondLa | Bob | Episode: "Chapter 5: Captive" (voice role - archive audio from Luck) | |
| 2026 | Rosanjin's Stove | David Rockefeller | Miniseries | |
| 2026 | The Lord of the Rings: The Rings of Power | the Balrog | Season 3 (voice role) | |
| 2026 | Hunting Alice Bell | Jason Nash | Miniseries | |

== Video games ==
| Year | Title | Voice role | Ref. |
|---|---|---|---|
| 2010 | Fable III | Ben Finn | |
| 2011 | Spare Parts | Con-Rad | |
| 2013 | Star Trek | Montgomery "Scotty" Scott | |
| 2016 | Star Wars Battlefront: Bespin | Dengar | |
| 2016 | Lego Star Wars: The Force Awakens | 0-MR1 | |
| 2016 | Ice Age: Arctic Blast | Buck | |
| 2016 | Lego Dimensions | Benji Dunn | |
| 2023 | Hogwarts Legacy | Headmaster Phineas Nigellus Black | |

== Audio ==
| Year | Title | Notes | Ref. |
|---|---|---|---|
| 2025–2026 | Harry Potter: The Full-Cast Audio Editions | Arthur Weasley | |

== Director ==
| Year | Title | Notes | Ref. |
|---|---|---|---|
| 2020 | Au Revoir, Chris Hemsworth | Also writer | |
| 2023 | Rick Astley – Forever and More | Music video | |
