= BSTV =

BSTV may represent:

- Bi-scalar tensor vector gravity
- BSTV, also called The Pilot Show
- BS-TV, a show made by Bentley University
- Bergen Student-TV
- Abbreviation of BISU Student Television, the student-run television station at Beijing International Studies University
