= Carpet (disambiguation) =

Carpet is a type of floor covering.

Carpet may also refer to:

- Carpet court, a type of tennis court
- Carpet (solitaire), a card game
- Certain geometer moths in the subfamily Larentiinae (but see also Carpet moth)
- "The Carpet" (The Office), a season two episode of The Office
- Carpet (Aladdin), a silent character from Disney's 1992 film Aladdin and its franchise
- Carpet (album), by the Swedish melodic death metal band Ceremonial Oath
- "The Carpet", song by Wilfred Sanderson 1925
- Emirates Stadium, the home of Arsenal FC, nicknamed The Carpet due to its famous playing surface
- Carpet (jammer), a WWII active radar jamming technology used by the Allies
- Slang for a woman's pubic hair

== See also ==
- Card-Pitt, often derisively referred to as the "carpets", a temporary NFL team formed by the merger of the Pittsburgh Steelers and Chicago Cardinals due to a shortage of players during World War II
- Karpets, a surname
