= Paul Garner (comedian) =

English writer, producer, and actor

Paul Garner (born 1968/69) is an English comedian, writer, producer and director. Garner is married to Kate, a singer songwriter who is the daughter of Chas Hodges from Chas & Dave.

== Personal life ==
Paul is married to Kate Hodges, the couple have a son.

== Radio ==
Garner started out in radio, working with Jo Bunting who has worked as a producer of Have I Got News For You and Chris Morris (The Day Today, Brass Eye) at BBC Radio Cambridgeshire.

Garner then contributed to Chris Morris's weekend radio show at GLR in London before their now infamous stint at BBC Radio 1 in the mid-1990s. It was on this show that Garner made his airport tannoy recordings that have since become an internet phenomenon. He would go to Heathrow and get the tannoy announcer to page passengers whose names were essentially rude phrases written phonetically and disguised as foreign names. For example, "Markollig Jezvahted & Levdaroem Dabahzted" sounded like the announcer was saying "My colleague just farted and left the room the bastard". As well as "Mister Farken Buss", which sounded like "missed the fucking bus".

Also in the mid-1990s, Garner hosted his own comedy and unsigned music show on the Chiltern Radio network whilst continuing to write for and appear on various shows at BBC Radio 1 including The Zoë Ball Breakfast Show and The Mark Tonderai Show. Garner also devised, wrote and played all the parts in the spoof Australian soap 'Strewth Street' which featured every week on The Kevin Greening Show.

== The 11 O'Clock Show ==
Garner made the transition to television in the multi-award-winning satirical series Brass Eye, which he wrote for and appeared in. He was then invited to take part in a new topical late night comedy show for Channel 4 called The 11 O'Clock Show. It was here that Garner worked alongside the likes of Ricky Gervais, Sacha Baron Cohen, Mackenzie Crook, Daisy Donovan and Iain Lee.

Whilst making The 11 O'Clock Show, Garner also started to collaborate with Paul Kaye on the final stages of the Dennis Pennis era. Along with Ant Hines, Garner and Kaye then wrote and developed a series of scripts for Channel 4 on which they collaborated with Ricky Gervais, Matt Lucas, Simon Pegg and Nick Frost.

After The 11 O'Clock Show, Garner went on to write for and/or appear in such shows as Da Ali G Show, Bo Selecta, The Harry Enfield Show, The Priory, High Spirits with Shirley Ghostman and My New Best Friend. He has also written extensively for comedian Jimmy Carr.

== The Pilot Show ==
Garner created, wrote and starred in E4/Channel 4's The Pilot Show which lured celebrities and members of the public into appearing on what they thought were genuine TV shows such as Lapdance Island and Who Wants To Be A Spaceman? A 16-part series of The Pilot Show, (renamed BSTV) was then made for American television with Garner once again starring in it, writing and executive producing.

Garner has also appeared as an actor in various shows such as Pulling and The Jim Jeffries Show. Most notably, Garner played the part of "Dave Millman", Sharon Horgan's police officer husband in the sitcom Angelos on Five.

In January 2008, Garner appeared on Russell Brand's Celebrity Hijack and, masquerading as a disgruntled cameraman, barricaded himself into the Big Brother house and had to be forcibly ejected by Russell and a pair of security guards.

== Strutter ==
Garner has created, written and appeared alongside Paul Kaye in two series of the award-winning MTV show Strutter. The show holds the Guinness World Record for 'The Most Number of Swear Words in a TV Show' beating the previous holder South Park.

He has also worked with Marc Wootton on the Showtime series La La Land.

== Conviction ==
In 2014, Garner was convicted of demolishing a listed 17th-century outbuilding on his Hertfordshire home. He was ordered to pay fines of £35,120.
