= Blue Jam =

British radio show

- Genre: Comedy; horror
- Running time: 1 hour
- Country of origin: United Kingdom
- Language: English
- Home station: BBC Radio 1
- Starring: Chris Morris; Kevin Eldon; Julia Davis; Mark Heap; David Cann; Amelia Bullmore
- Created by: Chris Morris
- Written by: Chris Morris; Graham Linehan; Arthur Mathews; Peter Baynham; David Quantick; Jane Bussmann; Robert Katz; Kevin Eldon; Julia Davis; Mark Heap; David Cann; Amelia Bullmore
- Directed by: Chris Morris
- Produced by: Chris Morris
- Narrated by: Chris Morris
- Original release: 14 November 1997 – 25 February 1999
- No. of series: 3
- No. of episodes: 18

Blue Jam is a sketch comedy radio programme created by Chris Morris. It was broadcast on BBC Radio 1 in the early hours of the morning for three series from 1997 to 1999. It comprises sketches, parodies and monologues on taboo topics set to ambient music. It features performances by Morris, Kevin Eldon, Julia Davis, Mark Heap, David Cann and Amelia Bullmore, and was written by Morris, Graham Linehan, Arthur Mathews, Peter Baynham, David Quantick, Jane Bussmann, Robert Katz and the cast.

Warp Records released a compilation of Blue Jam sketches in 2000. Morris adapted Blue Jam into the television series Jam, broadcast on Channel 4 in 2000. He adapted a Blue Jam monologue into his 2002 short film My Wrongs #8245–8249 & 117.

== Production ==
Blue Jam was created, directed and produced by Chris Morris. His previous work, the news satire Channel 4 series Brass Eye, had attracted controversy. Morris said he had been "forced to be a sort of surrogate lawyer", which he found creatively stifling. He said Blue Jam came from "a desolate mood. I had this misty, autumnal, boggy mood anyway, so I just went with that."

The writers include Morris, Graham Linehan and Arthur Matthews and David Quantick. The cast includes Morris, David Cann, Julia Davis, Kevin Eldon, Mark Heap and Amelia Bullmore.

== Format ==
Jam comprises sketches and monologues set to ambient music. The Guardian described it as a "lo-fi anti-comedy", with taboo topics including dead children and abusive doctors. Quantick later described it as "In the Night Garden in hell". NME wrote that Blue Jam was "about the things that happen when sentimentality and 'feeling' obliterates reality and thinking, when hypocrisy reigns and the taboo is just another lifestyle choice for the toxically jaded".

Sequences include monologues performed by Morris describing the experiences of a mentally ill man in the London media industry; an abusive doctor (Cann); spoof interviews with celebrities such as the biographer Andrew Morton and Jerry Springer; a couple whose television set is infested with lizards; a dysfunctional man who employs an office to assist with trivial tasks such as finding his wallet (Heap); a couple (Cann and Davis) unconcerned about the abduction of their six-year-old son; a four-year-old fixer covering up a murder; a disease known as "the gush" afflicting pornographic actors; a couple (Eldon and Davis) having surreal sex; and "stings" that parody BBC DJs such as Chris Moyles and Jo Whiley.

== Broadcast ==
Three series were produced of six episodes each. All episodes were originally broadcast weekly on BBC Radio 1. Series 1 was broadcast from 14 November to 19 December 1997; series 2 was broadcast from 27 March to 1 May 1998; and series 3 broadcast from 21 January to 25 February 1999. The episodes were broadcast early in the morning. The first five episodes of series 1 of Blue Jam were repeated by BBC Radio 4 Extra in February and March 2014, and series 2 was rebroadcast in December.

== Reception ==
Blue Jam was favourably reviewed by The Guardian and The Independent. Digital Spy wrote in 2014: "It's a heady cocktail that provokes an odd, unsettling reaction in the listener, yet Blue Jam is still thumpingly and frequently laugh-out-loud hilarious." Hot Press called it "as odd as comedy gets". It won the prize for comedy at the 2000 Sony Radio Awards. Vice described Blue Jam as "comedy extreme in its ambition".

== CD release ==
Professional ratings
Review scores
Source	Rating
AllMusic	4.5/5 stars
NME	8/10
Select	4/5 stars

Warp Records released a compilation of Blue Jam sketches on 23 October 2000. Vice described the release as Warp's "boldest act of diversification".

Track listing

1. "Blue Jam Intro"
2. "Doc Phone"
3. "Lamacq sting"
4. "4 ft Car"
5. "Suicide Journalist"
6. "Acupuncture"
7. "Bad Sex"
8. "Mayo Sting"
9. "Unflustered Parents"
10. "Moyles Sting"
11. "TV Lizards"
12. "Doc Cock"
13. "Hobbs Sting"
14. "Morton Interview"
15. "Fix It Girl"
16. "Porn"
17. "Kids Party"
18. "Club News"
19. "Whiley Sting"
20. "Little Girl Balls"
21. "Blue Jam Outro"
22. "www.bishopslips.com" (not a real track)

== Related shows ==
Blue Jam was adapted for television and broadcast on Channel 4 as Jam. It used unusual editing techniques to achieve an unnerving ambience in keeping with the radio show. Many of the sketches were lifted from the radio version, even to the extent of simply setting images to the radio soundtrack. A subsequent "re-mixed" airing, called Jaaaaam was even more extreme in its use of post-production gadgetry, often heavily distorting the footage.
