= Time to Go =

Time to Go may refer to:

- Time to Go: The Southern Psychedelic Moment 1981–86, a 2012 compilation album
- "A Time to Go", a song by Bobby Hutcherson from the 1980 album Patterns
- "Time to Go", a song by Dean Lewis from the 2019 album A Place We Knew
- "Time to Go", a song composed by Delia Derbyshire, released on the 2002 remaster of 1968's BBC Radiophonic Music
- "Time to Go", a song by Dropkick Murphys from the 2003 album Blackout
- "Time to Go", a song by Dumb Luck from The Naked Truth EP (2000)
- "Time to Go", a song by Keane, released as a B-side to the 2008 single "The Lovers Are Losing"
- "Time to Go", a song by Nina Sky, 2004
- "Time to Go", a song by Oprichniki from the 2001 split EP Toxic Holocaust / Oprichniki
- "Time to Go", a song by Saga from the 1980 album Silent Knight
- "Time to Go", a song by Supergrass from the 1995 album I Should Coco
- "Time to Go", a song by The Maine from the 2008 album Can't Stop Won't Stop
- "Time to Go", a song by Wilfred Sanderson
- "Party II (Time to Go)", a song by MxPx from The Renaissance EP (2001)
- "Second Class Male"/"Time to Go", a pair of satirical columns in The Observer in 1999

== See also ==
- Goodnight, It's Time to Go, a 1961 album by Jack McDuff
- Time to Go Home, a 2015 album by Chastity Belt
