= Paedogeddon =

- Brass Eye episode
- Episode no.: Episode 7
- Directed by: Tristram Shapeero
- Written by: Chris Morris; Shane Allen; Peter Baynham; Charlie Brooker; Jane Bussmann; Phil Clarke; Arthur Mathews; David Quantick; James Serafinowicz
- Original air date: 26 July 2001
- Running time: 27 minutes

"Paedogeddon" is a 2001 special of the British satirical current affairs series Brass Eye. It was written, produced, and presented by Chris Morris, and directed by Tristram Shapeero. It first aired on Channel 4 and S4C in the United Kingdom on 26 July 2001. The special is a parody news programme on paedophilia, and covers farcical stories about paedophiles and sexual crimes towards children, highlighting the media's hysteria surrounding the issue and how its methods of gaining testimony from victims often end up demeaning them. It also features unsuspecting celebrities and politicians duped into advocating spoof child safety campaigns.

After it aired, Channel 4 phone lines became jammed with thousands of callers making complaints about the broadcast. Tabloid newspapers published many articles expressing revulsion, finding its comedic approach to child abuse to be sickening. There was particular concern over the use of child actors in sexually threatening scenarios, and the special was subject to a special investigation by the Broadcasting Standards Commission. Complaints were also made to the Metropolitan Police. Government ministers intervened, who disapproved of the special and suggested new regulatory procedures to more quickly remove programmes from broadcast. Other critics were more sympathetic, noting the reaction to the special vindicated its own satire of media hysteria.

== Synopsis ==
In the format of a current affairs programme, a team from a live studio reports their organized efforts to secure children in stadiums across the country, and Morris makes an appeal regarding the sighting of a paedophile disguised as a school. A segment covers institutional paedophilia, where a sex pest is a teacher repeatedly employed at a school. The studio turns to live coverage of a riot outside a prison, protesting the expected release of a child molester who was left brain-dead and quadriplegic by an act of prison violence. A segment reconstructs his life harming children; a victim reenacts the abuse by rubbing her breasts on camera.

In another segment, celebrities and politicians promote a child safety campaign warning about the behaviour of paedophiles. Paedophiles are said to leave predatory phonebooth cards for children; be genetically alike to crabs; use cryptic text message slang; and use coded clapping motions in public to communicate with other paedophiles. A focus group is consulted on the concept of rectal implants for paedophiles that fatally expand if they detect the voice of children. An anonymously interviewed paedophile is listlessly called a series of names. The programme breaks with an advert for an American reality series about violent anti-paedophile vigilantes.

The studio reports a rioter's attempt to catapult into the prison. A segment reports that special trousers are sold to hide erections in playgrounds. The studio is updated with news of a paedophile piloting a microlight above a stadium. Another segment discusses American child pageants and a paedophilia-themed rap artist popular with tweens. An obscenity investigator is queried in a gallery of sexual collages that ambiguously use the appearance of children. The studio is invaded by a pro-paedophile organization whose spokesman is then pilloried. Morris asks if he'd have sex with his six-year-old son. The spokesman apologetically replies he doesn't find the son attractive.

Celebrities and politicians explain that online games for children are predatory: paedophiles use the eyes of in-game characters as a webcam; derive sexual pleasure from a device paired to the in-game actions of children; use special gloves to remotely molest any part of a child pressed against a screen; interfere with children using a penis-shaped soundwave; occupy an area of the internet the size of Ireland; and cause keyboards to release vapours that make children suggestible. The studio finally reports that rioters successfully set the offender ablaze on a wicker phallus. The programme closes with a guest music act: a school choir sings a sentimental ballad about how they're not ready for sex.

== Background ==
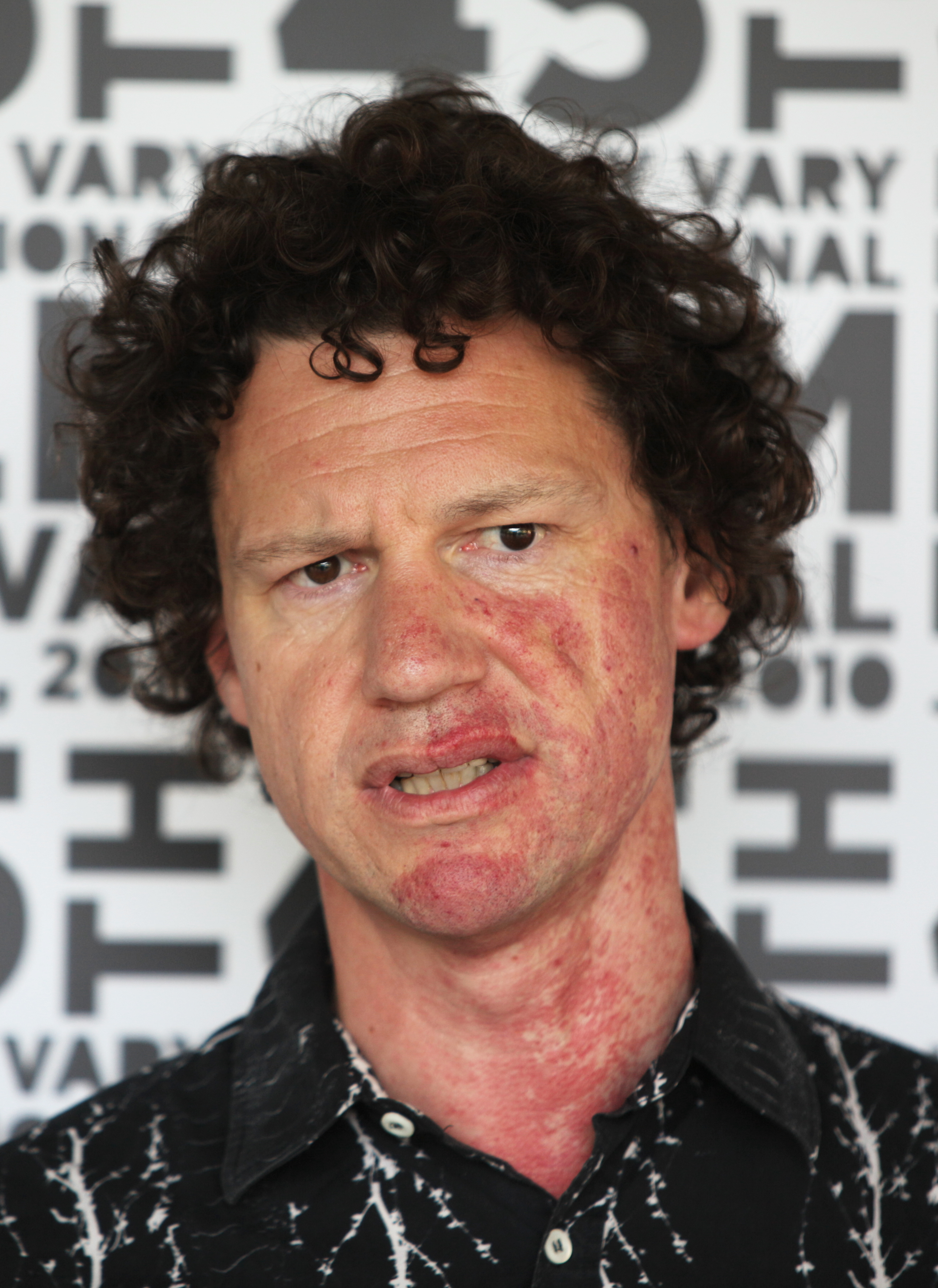
Chris Morris

Brass Eye is a satirical current affairs programme created by Morris that ran as one six-episode series in 1997. It covered contemporary issues in Britain, such as drugs, science, sex, and crime. The series had already established a controversial reputation, attracting media attention for duping celebrities and politicians into promoting fictitious and absurd campaigns. In 2000, Grade invited Morris to make a final special.

Sharon Lockyer and Feona Attwood writing for Popular Communication highlight the context in which the special was made, explaining that from the late 1990s British media developed a profuse interest in predatory paedophiles. After the abduction and murder of 8-year-old Sarah Payne in 2000, the newspaper News of the World ran a "Name and Shame" campaign publishing the name and location of convicted child sex offenders. It resulted in violent vigilante protests and innocent people mistakenly targeted, such as a paediatrician being confused for a paedophile; the veracity of this story is disputed however. Television documentaries were also made, such as Dispatches: Paedophiles in 2001. In production, childhood photos provided by production team members were used as photographs of children that appear throughout the programme. The context for their use was explained under written consent.

In one sequence that was discarded, Morris would dress up in a top hat and horse riding gear and inhale helium, obtained for the scene at the last moment with great effort, and go door-to-door in a Balham neighbourhood informing people that a paedophile who wore strange clothes and spoke with a squeaky voice had moved into the area.

The six-episode series aired again in 2001 in a planned lead-up to the special, but the transmission date for the special was reported to be delayed on 5 July due to sensitivities concerning the disappearance of schoolgirl Bunmi Shagaya and the disappearance of 15-year-old schoolgirl Danielle Jones in June. The special aired on 26 July 2001 at 10:35 pm on Channel 4 and S4C. Channel 4 carried forward the high viewership of Big Brother that aired prior, and before the programme an announcer warned, "Now on 4, a Brass Eye Special which takes an uncompromising look at the subject of paedophilia. This programme contains scenes which some viewers might find disturbing." The special is 27 minutes long.

== Themes ==
The special addresses media hysteria, misinformation, and media hypocrisy on the sexualisation of children.

Although it is often thought that Brass Eye was intentionally provoking media anger, writer Peter Baynham said that he and Morris "were just presenting things that had come out of our brain".

== Participants ==
The special included celebrities, politicians, and other individuals. Gary Lineker and Phil Collins are duped into advocating a spoof children's charity. Lineker holds up a photo of a child distantly depicted on a hillside and says, "If you attempt to show this to a paedophile, he will try and attack it in an attempt to get to the child". Collins adds, "Now I'm talking Nonce Sense". Upon discovering his appearance was a hoax, Collins sought legal advice and stated that he was led to believe that he was participating in a legitimate public service programme that would be distributed to schools and colleges.

MP Gerald Howarth appears in the special presenting an allegedly discovered phonebooth card of a partially nude man that reads "Kids, I can help with your homework", and expresses disgust. After learning his appearance was a hoax, he told the BBC Radio 4 programme Today that Channel 4 failed its duty to the public, although he admitted he had not seen the special himself. Channel 4 representative Matthew Baker defended the special as a satire of how the media reports on the issue. Howarth described this as "garbage".

Radio presenter Neil Fox says paedophiles are genetically alike to crabs, adding "That is scientific fact. There's no real evidence for it, but it's scientific fact." In 2008, Fox admitted "They got me hook, line and sinker", but otherwise felt that a comedy about paedophilia was tasteless.

Tomorrow's World presenter Philippa Forrester and ITN reporter Nicholas Owen appear in the sequence claiming online video games can be predatory, describing an in-game cartoon dog named Pantou who spies on children. The sequence additionally includes MP Barbara Follett, who says special gloves are used to remotely molest children, and comedian Richard Blackwood who says children's computer keyboards release toxic vapours. Owen concludes, "Let's put a bomb under Pantou's chin and stamp on his throat. Let's rip this dog's brains out." Owen and Follett complained to the BSC alleging unfair treatment. These complaints were dismissed. Labour MP Syd Rapson was filmed describing "trust-me trousers", which were supposedly worn by paedophiles and inflated to hide an erection.

One participant is a real paedophile anonymously referred to as "Peter", who was a member of the Paedophile Information Exchange. He appears in the sequence where Morris lists a series of nonsensical names, such as "nut administrator", "bush dodger", "small-bean regarder", and "The Crazy World of Arthur Brown", to which he replies, "it's just another form of racism". This comment was not a scripted punchline.

== Reception ==
The immediate popular response was overwhelmingly negative. There were an estimated two million viewers at the beginning of the special, and by the time it finished one million viewers had switched off. BT then received thousands of directory enquires for the Channel 4 complaints department. Its switchboard became jammed with 2,000 calls, with an additional 1,000 complaints made to the Independent Television Commission (ITC). Sarah Arnold writing for News of the World claimed the Channel 4 offices in London were seen by police hours after it aired due to bomb threats. The Metropolitan Police also received complaints.

There was a tabloid campaign against Morris. The Daily Mail decried the special in a headline quoting Minister for Child Protection Beverley Hughes, that read "unspeakably sick", and described it as "filth for the delectation of perverts" created under the boastful facade of liberal values that in fact concealed a lack of creativity and intelligence in television making. Hughes later admitted she had not seen the special. Simon Heffer wrote it was "the most grievous breach of taste I have ever witnessed on TV, and a programme that only a small proportion of the psychologically sick could have found enjoyable" adding he could only watch half of it. The Daily Star ran stories attacking Morris and Channel 4 commissioners, one of which infamously ran on the page opposite a story commenting on the breast growth of the then-15 year old singer Charlotte Church.

Scenes highlighted as being disturbing included Morris posing as a rapper who dates children, who is named "JLB8" and performs with a dummy of a child attached to his crotch, and another where Morris as a studio presenter presents a boy to a paedophile (played by Simon Pegg) placed in a pillory.

Victoria Coren for Evening Standard wrote, "One day, a new generation will write those lists of 'Best TV Programmes Ever'. Then, ah then, we will have the power. [...] But when it comes to the Brass Eye special on paedophilia, they will yawn and turn away. They will have heard it so many times before. Yeah, yeah, best ever, shut up now, grandma."

BBC entertainment editor William Gallagher criticised the celebrity campaign segments as too repetitive and numerous, writing that it simply padded out the programme's runtime, concluding "It was not a great piece of comedy but it was pretty good [...] it had the right idea about how vilified anyone can be for the mere mention of paedophilia."

Tom Gatti for New Statesman praised the pacing as densely packed and spry, pointing out several jokes that occur only within the first two and a half minutes and commenting, "In a sketch show, some of these ideas might have run for several minutes each: not in the ultra-compressed atmosphere of Brass Eye."

Home Secretary David Blunkett said he was "dismayed". As Blunkett was not in the country at the time, The Daily Telegraph said that he had presumably relied on a description of the special.

In an interview with The Observer, Ian Hislop referred to the special as sharing a similar satirical remit to the magazine Private Eye of which he is editor, commenting, "I thought that the Brass Eye on paedophilia caught that surreal amorality of television when it is pretending to take issues seriously."

An editorial piece in The Guardian stated, "As it happens, we do not stand with Channel 4 on the substance of the programme. Brass Eye was a deeply unpleasant piece of television that degraded children much more than it satirised either the media or celebrities or politicians." An editorial piece in The Daily Telegraph criticised the involvement of senior politicians, "On hearing the word [paedophilia], otherwise calm people are expected to assume an attitude of incoherent rage. It is worth pointing out, if only for the record, that Brass Eye was a parody, not of paedophilia, but of the low-grade investigative programmes that seem to dominate evening television"

The News of the World published the names of all writers of the special in a "Roll of shame". Those named beyond Morris and Baynham were Shane Allen, Charlie Brooker, Jane Bussmann, Phil Clarke, Arthur Mathews, David Quantick, and "James Sezchuan" (James Serafinowicz). The Sun published a headline that read "They must never work in television again". Baynham in 2021 recalled this headline and quipped, "I remember being in my flat and quaking in my boots at that", and said of Morris that the overall controversy at the time was "like water off a duck's back for him". Baynham said the author of the article had aimlessly "just gone through the credits of the show", noting it additionally printed the names of the sound supervisor, catering, and Peter Fincham, who would become controller of BBC One.

In 2019, The Guardian ranked "Paedogeddon" at number 37 in their list of "The 100 best TV shows of the 21st century".
