= Jam (TV series) =

British experimental black comedy sketch show

- Cover of the British DVD release
- Genre: Sketch comedy Black comedy
- Created by: Chris Morris
- Based on: Blue Jam by Chris Morris
- Written by: Chris Morris; Peter Baynham
- Directed by: Chris Morris
- Starring: Chris Morris; Mark Heap; Kevin Eldon; Amelia Bullmore; David Cann; Julia Davis
- Country of origin: United Kingdom
- Original language: English
- No. of series: 1
- No. of episodes: 6

Production
- Executive producer: Peter Fincham
- Producer: Chris Morris
- Cinematography: Andy Hollis
- Editors: Marvyn Young; Mathew Wood; Billy Sneddon
- Running time: Approx. 25 minutes
- Production company: Talkback Productions

Original release
- Network: Channel 4
- Release: 23 March – 27 April 2000

Jam is a British black comedy sketch show, created, co-written, produced and directed by Chris Morris. It was broadcast on Channel 4 between 23 March and 27 April 2000. It was based on the earlier BBC Radio 1 show, Blue Jam, and consists of an unconnected series of disturbing, often perverse and surreal sketches, unfolding over an ambient soundtrack. Many of the sketches re-used the original radio soundtracks with the actors lip-synching their lines, an unusual technique which added to the programme's unsettling atmosphere, and featured unorthodox use of visual effects and sound manipulation.

Morris introduced each episode in the style of a surreal compère, reciting free-form poetry over a nightmarish montage, often depicting someone as their life spirals out of control (for instance, one montage sees an unkempt man drinking from a bottle in a bag as he walks down the street, before being kidnapped by "dung-breathed men" and forced to wrestle pigs in the Fens). The sketches themselves would often begin with a simple premise, e.g. two parents showing indifference to the whereabouts of their young child, and then escalate it with ever-more disturbing developments (the parents being phoned to come and identify the child's corpse, but asking if it can instead be taxied to their home, as they do not want to interrupt their evening). The cast, largely composed of actors Morris had worked with in his early satirical shows, such as The Day Today and Brass Eye, included Amelia Bullmore, David Cann, Julia Davis, Kevin Eldon and Mark Heap, as well as occasional appearances from Morris himself.

The show perplexed audiences and critics on its initial broadcast: some hailed it as breakthrough, daringly original television, while others dismissed it as merely sickening and juvenile.

== Production ==
Jam was co-written by Peter Baynham, with additional material contributed by Jane Bussmann, David Quantick, Graham Linehan, Arthur Mathews and the cast themselves. Filming took place in late 1999 under the working title Apes and Music. Locations included Ealing, where one local newspaper reported that it was about "kidnapping foreign leaders".

The series consisted of six twenty-minute episodes, and, unusually for a TV show on a commercial channel, had no advert break in the middle, which was the first time an entertainment show had run without ads on Channel 4. Morris has said that he asked Channel 4 to broadcast it without a break so as to not spoil the atmosphere. Sketches often had a documentary feel to them, the characters acting as if they were being interviewed about recent events.

Classed as a black comedy, Jam had no opening or closing titles, the latter being replaced with its now-defunct web address, www.jamcredits.com. Instead, it would begin with a disturbing monologue by Morris, coupled with a corresponding montage. These would, to some degree or other, follow a character as their nightmares are made real, or their preconceptions are shattered, leaving them in a bleak reality (i.e. a woman walking her dog, only to discover it is just skeletal remains). Morris would then say: "Then welcome", followed by a nonsensical sentence (e.g. "Ooh, astonishing sod ape"), before finally announcing: "Welcome... in Jam". The word "jam" would rarely be said normally; it would either be heavily distorted, spoken in a strange accent, or just screamed repeatedly at the viewer.

The series had a late-night remix version during the 4Later slot, entitled Jaaaaam. Its audiovisual distortions of the original series introduced the musical remix concept to British television. Morris further aped music culture through the creation of a fluid sound mix, with music, speech and other sound effects, drawing on the work of ambient DJs.

== Reception ==
Jam received a mixed reaction from critics, with views ranging from "the most radical and original television programme broadcast in years" to accusations of it being "adolescent", "sick", and "self-indulgent". The show received a number of complaints and was criticised by the Broadcasting Standards Commission. Although it is not generally as recognised as Morris's earlier, satirical TV work, it remains a cult show.

Three complaints about Jam were upheld. These concerned the sketches "Coffin Mistake", "Sex for Houses", and "Plumber Baby", as they were deemed insensitive to the bereaved and those with learning difficulties. The sketches in question dealt, respectively, with a man delivering a small homemade coffin to a couple whose child was stillborn, a couple prostituting the husband's mentally disabled sister as part of a property deal, and a bereaved mother who bribes a plumber to "fix" her dead baby in the way he would a boiler.

Five of the show's six episodes were classified "18" by the BBFC for very strong language and sexual content (particularly the "Gush" sketch, which depicts a prosthetic erection and fake semen, in a story about a pornographic film where the male actors die due to excessive ejaculation). Despite its content, the broadcast attracted nowhere near the controversy that the following year's Brass Eye special, "Paedogeddon", about media panic surrounding paedophilia, did.

In a 2008 interview, contributor Graham Linehan admitted he felt out of place during writing, and had mixed feelings about Jam: "Jam wouldn't be my favourite thing of Chris's, and it was the one where I didn't really feel like we were contributing a lot. Its mood was so grim that I just found it difficult to join in. I think that Chris was just interested in tying people in moral knots—giving them a moral problem and then just twisting it so they have to do something awful to get out of the first moral problem. Although this is a secondary impulse for him, he's also interested in pushing buttons that haven't been pushed in comedy in people; making them laugh in a way that they're not used to. [...] Personally, I just want to make people laugh."

The show was featured on Channel 4's 100 Greatest Scary Moments.

Adam Buxton and Joe Cornish parodied Jam in Channel 4's The Adam and Joe Show. Entitled "Goitre", the sketch saw the two make a very amateurish attempt at creating unsettling sketches. One such sketch involved a repair man who found a "dead baby" (actually a doll) behind a TV and insisted he would have to "bugger" it in order to fix the television leading to a meta-comedic refusal by Joe Cornish to act out the scene. The sketch later appeared as an extra feature on the Jam DVD.

== Episode list ==
No.
1	"Jam 1: chemotherapy wig"
Robert Kilroy Silk loses his mind, a man picks up his car from the garage only to find it is only four feet long, a suicidal man jumps off a first-floor balcony forty times rather than once off the top of the building, and an agency provides thick people for jobs that thick people are particularly good at.
2	"Jam 2: astonishing sod ape"
A woman calls a plumber to fix her dead baby, porn stars are afflicted by a deadly disease called "the gush", a man is buried alive because he does not want to die in his old age, and Mr. Ventham goes to a therapist to find out what he should do on Saturday evening.
3	"Jam 3: oooohmhuhhhh"
A couple calls a repairman to deal with the lizards coming out of their television, a woman farts on her secretary's head rather than give one of her employees a pay raise, Mr. Ventham cannot find his wallet, and a man tries to hold up a shop with a gun in his stomach.
4	"Jam 4: arrested for copying dogs"
A doctor takes up phone sex to raise money for a young girl with cancer, Mr. Ventham's chin is a bit hot, a six-year-old girl helps a man get rid of a dead body, and a couple whose baby was miscarried is given the gift of a small coffin by their neighbour.
5	"Jam 5: fussfussfussfussfussfussfuss"
A woman's unorthodox method of acupuncture tends to leave her patients dead, a man tries to hold up a shop but forgets the axe he was going to use, a doctor blinds himself to get out of explaining an unusual prescription, and a very uninterested couple deal with the disappearance of their son.
6	"Jam 6: born dead through your own arse"
A woman tricks a man into "assaulting" her, two parents believe their daughter is really a 45-year-old man trapped in a little girl's body, a couple have an extremely bizarre sexual encounter, and a doctor insists there is nothing wrong with wetting yourself.

== Home video ==
Jam was released to DVD in April, 2003, and has numerous pointless extras. For instance, each episode has both a "normal version" and a "special version". Other "versions" include a miniaturised version, a miniaturised moving version, a lava lamp version, a fast-forwarded version, the first 19 seconds of the episode only, and a fast-forwarded version expanded to the original running time. This last is the only one reasonably capable of being watched without extreme difficulty. In addition, the items listed under the "Extras" on the disc are, much of the time, little more than additional copies of sketches, with the occasional deleted scene or shot of an audition or rehearsal. The only exceptions are Adam and Joe's "Goitre" parody of Jam, and a link to "Undeleted Scenes", which, when selected, advises the viewer to take the DVD back to the shop they bought it from and complain "loudly and obnoxiously" about the lack of undeleted scenes.

When attempting to change the audio settings to surround sound, the DVD provides the viewer a link to an MP3 file (no longer hosted) on the show's official site and advises that it should be played from behind the viewer while watching the show; the file was a stereo recording of wind, thumps and distant artillery.

=== Easter eggs ===
- Selecting "Play All At Once" from the "Play All" menu reveals a large red dot; by pressing the select button on the DVD remote when this is shown, an audition for a deleted scene can be seen.
- At the end of episode three, just before the Talkback Productions credit is shown, a dog's face is flashed up on screen for a few seconds, with a red dot. When the dot appears, pressing select will show the trailer for Morris's 2003 short film, My Wrongs 8245–8249 & 117. The film is an adaptation of a story from Blue Jam, about a dog that takes over the life of its minder. Numerous brief images depicting scenes similar to those in My Wrongs appear throughout Jam, suggesting that there had been a previous, aborted attempt to film this story as a sketch.
- Selecting "Play All Once" will, obviously, show the episodes in order, but at the end of episode two, just before episode three, a backstage look at the filming of the "Gush" porn film is shown. It is regarded as an outtake due to the laughter at the end.
- At the end of "London/Tokyo Jam Exhibition", a rehearsal for a deleted scene starring Kevin Eldon is shown. The scene is similar to the "45-year-old little girl" sketch in episode six. It is an adaptation of the "Optician" sketch from episode two of Blue Jam.
