= Peter Baynham =

Welsh screenwriter, stand-up comedian and performer

- Born: Cardiff, Wales
- Occupations: Screenwriter; Stand-up comedian Performer
- Years active: 1987–present
- Naval career
- Allegiance: Elizabeth II
- Branch: British Merchant Navy

Peter Baynham is a Welsh screenwriter, stand-up comedian and performer. His writing work includes collaborations with comedy figures such as Armando Iannucci, Steve Coogan, Chris Morris, Sacha Baron Cohen and Sarah Smith. Born in Cardiff, Wales, Baynham served in the British Merchant Navy at age 16 with a desire to travel the world after leaving school and later pursued a career in comedy as a stand-up comedian and then he became a writer and a performer for various news and sketch comedies in radio and television. He also became a writer in feature film.

In television, with Iannucci and Coogan, Baynham is a writer for the sitcom I'm Alan Partridge and a presenter for the satirical comedy sketch show The Saturday Night Armistice. With Morris, he is a writer for the satirical comedy miniseries The Day Today, Brass Eye and Jam. Baynham himself created, wrote and directed the adult animated black comedy miniseries I Am Not an Animal. In feature film, with Baron Cohen, Baynham is a writer for the comedy films Borat (2006), Brüno (2009), Grimsby (2016), Borat Subsequent Moviefilm (2020), and Ali G: Who Iz I? (2026). With Smith, he is a writer for the animated films Arthur Christmas (2011) and Ron's Gone Wrong (2021). With Iannucci and Coogan again, Baynham is a writer for the crime comedy film Alan Partridge: Alpha Papa (2013). Other feature films as a writer include the romantic comedy film Arthur (2011) and the animated film Hotel Transylvania (2012).

== Early life ==
Baynham was born and raised in Cardiff, Wales as the second of four children. He attended St Mary's Primary School in Canton and Lady Mary RC High School in Cyncoed. Baynham said he found school difficult, finding himself shy, weedy and unpopular. He found himself too unathletic to enjoy rugby, despite expectations from his father. He left school with eight O-Levels, four with an "A" grade and joined the British Merchant Navy at age 16 with a desire to travel the world. Baynham described his experience in the British Merchant Navy as unsuited to his character, saying "I was with men who drank beer for breakfast. A lot of them were fascist, and I mean really fascist. They say travel should broaden the mind but these blokes would have been kicked out of the Ku Klux Klan for being too extreme". Duties included performing operations on a chemical tanker while wearing a hazmat suit. He reflected by saying "I'm small and would basically float around inside the suit like a confused foetus, trying to pick up spanners and operate a walkie-talkie". Baynham is qualified to navigate a supertanker. After five years, he was made redundant due to government cuts in defence. He went on to serve as second mate on a private yacht in Monte Carlo, Monaco as a summer job.

== Career ==
=== 1987–2004: Radio and television ===
In 1987, Baynham moved to London, England with his brother and worked by selling some advertising space in The Guardian newspaper. He began attending a comedy workshop The Comedy Store. He became a stand-up comedian and created the character "Mr. Buckstead", a psychotic teacher and poet. Baynham said the act consisted of "[talking] about the terrible things he did to his pupils". During this period, he financially supported himself with self-employment income under the Enterprise Allowance Scheme, his redundancy cheque (from the British Merchant Navy) and a bank loan that was nominally meant for buying a car. He earned around £20 (GBP) per gig and made £4,500 in his first year. To additionally support himself, Baynham wrote sketches for the satirical radio current affairs sketch show Week Ending. He earned £18 for each minute of material and contributed around two minutes of material each week. After four years, Baynham felt that his stand-up career was not progressing and he decided to commit to radio. He became a cast member for the BBC television sketch series Fist of Fun.

Aiming to break into television, Baynham wrote one-liner jokes for a Terry Wogan-presented Friday Night show. He was unimpressed by Wogan's delivery of the jokes. While working at the BBC offices and looking for photocopier paper, Baynham encountered Armando Iannucci who would introduce him to Chris Morris who was creating the satirical sketch comedy miniseries The Day Today. Although Morris was not interested in accepting more writers for the project, Baynham was made a writer after Morris was impressed by a sketch that he wrote that involved horses who infest the London Underground. Baynham also appears in a sketch as a reporter (named "Colin Poppshed") who presented "Gay News" where he farcically announces the gayness of various roads, periodic table elements, cars and walls. Baynham also became a guest and contributor for the radio show The Chris Morris Music Show, but he was suspended by the BBC for two weeks for conceiving a joke where Morris falsely implies on air that Michael Heseltine had died. Baynham stated that Morris technically did not announce his death, saying "if there is any news of Michael Heseltine's death in the next hour, we'll let you know". Baynham also became a cast member for the radio series Lee and Herring.

Baynham became a writer for the sitcom I'm Alan Partridge, a spin-off of the comedy character Alan Partridge (as performed by Steve Coogan in The Day Today), an incompetent sports reporter who gets progressed as a tactless and self-satisfied television personality. Baynham thought that Alan Partridge was underdeveloped because the format of The Day Today made him "bracketed and contained within presenting to [the] camera". Baynham would realise that Alan Partridge would be a "three-dimensional" character. Baynham, with the writing team of Coogan and Iannucci, applied worldbuilding such as establishing the geography of Alan Partridge's residence of "Linton Travel Tavern". Coogan credited Baynham for making Alan Partridge more human and sympathetic. Baynham described his work on I'm Alan Partridge as a highly productive and enjoyable period of his career, saying "It's my happiest, most fun writing experience ever really, it was just so exciting".

In the same period, Fist of Fun transferred to television where Baynham makes an on-screen appearance of his character "Peter", a 32-year-old Welshman. Baynham also served as a presenter of the satirical comedy sketch show The Saturday Night Armistice. Baynham created and performed the character "Terry from Pontypridd" in a popular television advertising campaign for Pot Noodle, promoted with the catchphrase "they're too gorgeous". The campaign propelled Baynham to unexpected fame which he reported that strangers would shout "gorgeous" at him in public and that a university student would threw a Pot Noodle at him on stage, while touring with Lee and Herring. Baynham has written with Morris for the satirical black comedy miniseries Brass Eye and its controversial special "Paedogeddon!" that attracted widespread media attention for its comedic portrayal of paedophilia. Baynham also wrote the Bob and Margaret episode "Neighbors" as well as writing the additional material for the three episodes of the sketch show Big Train. He served as a writer for the radio series Blue Jam which was adapted into the TV miniseries Jam that Baynham and Morris worked together on. Baynham also became a guest for the eighteen episodes of the radio comedy game show The 99p Challenge. He created the adult animated black comedy miniseries I Am Not an Animal which follows a group of intelligent talking animals who escape a vivisection laboratory.

=== 2005–present: Feature film ===
Baynham felt uncertain about his future in television after I Am Not an Animal was poorly received by BBC executives in which one of them said to him: "I won't be paying a return visit to this". Meanwhile, Baynham received a phone call from Sacha Baron Cohen who asked him if he could help continue his faltering feature film project of Borat Sagdiyev. Baynham replied that he was not interested because he was working on creating his own sitcom, but then he changed his mind and phoned Baron Cohen later that day by expressing interest and became a writer for the 2006 mockumentary comedy film Borat. After the film's success, Baynham continued his collaboration with Baron Cohen and he became a writer for the 2009 mockumentary comedy film Brüno. Under director Jason Winer, he became a writer for the 2011 romantic comedy film Arthur, a remake of the 1981 film of the same name.

Earlier in 2005, Baynham conceived of a Christmas story (where Santa Claus has an "impractical and useless" son) and collaborated with Sarah Smith at Aardman Animations to write a screenplay for the 2011 animated film Arthur Christmas. The story deals with Santa's global operation to deliver presents to every child, which Baynham said he considered with a "pedantic" detail such as what would be mathematically possible in 12 hours with one million elves and a mile wide spaceship. Under director Genndy Tartakovsky, Baynham became a writer for the 2012 animated film Hotel Transylvania. He also became an executive producer for the 2012 political satire black comedy film The Dictator which he worked with Baron Cohen on. He collaborated with Armando Iannucci and Steve Coogan again to create an Alan Partridge feature film and he became a writer for the 2013 crime comedy film Alan Partridge: Alpha Papa. With Baron Cohen again, Baynham became a writer for the 2016 spy action comedy film Grimsby and continued this collaboration as a writer for the 2020 mockumentary comedy film Borat Subsequent Moviefilm, a sequel to the previous Borat film. In 2021, Baynham launched the six-episode surreal comedy podcast series Brain Cigar with his close friend and long-time collaborator Jeremy Simmonds. In the same year, Baynham also collaborated with Smith on her animation studio Locksmith Animation's first animated feature film Ron's Gone Wrong. He resumed his collaboration with Baron Cohen and became writer and executive producer for the 2026 film Ali G: Who Iz I?.

== Reputation ==
James Rampton of The Independent described Baynham as "an anonymous foot-soldier in Armando Iannucci's all-conquering comedy army". Brendon Connelley of /Film said "Baynham isn't exactly comedy royalty in the UK — more like a secret power behind the thrones". Baynham himself said "It feels quite cool, in a mad way, to be someone who skulks about in the shadows". Kathryn Williams of WalesOnline argued that Baynham, Iannucci, Steve Coogan and Chris Morris "revolutionised both topical satire and character comedy in the 1990s".

== Personal life ==
Baynham settled in Los Angeles, California after completing Borat. He is a citizen of the United States.

== See also ==
- List of Academy Award winners and nominees from Great Britain
