= Bussmann and Quantick Kingsize =

British radio programme

- Running time: 30 minutes
- Country of origin: United Kingdom
- Language: English
- Home station: BBC Radio 4
- Starring: Jane Bussmann; David Quantick; Peter Serafinowicz; Emma Clarke; Steve Brody
- Written by: Jane Bussmann; David Quantick; Steve Brody
- Produced by: Phil Bowker
- Original release: April 1998 – May 1998
- No. of series: 1
- No. of episodes: 5

Bussmann and Quantick Kingsize is a short-lived radio programme that aired from April to May 1998. There were five half-hour episodes and it was broadcast on BBC Radio 4. It starred Jane Bussmann, David Quantick, Peter Serafinowicz, Emma Clarke, and Steve Brody. It was produced by Phil Bowker.
