= David Quantick =

English novelist, comedy writer and critic

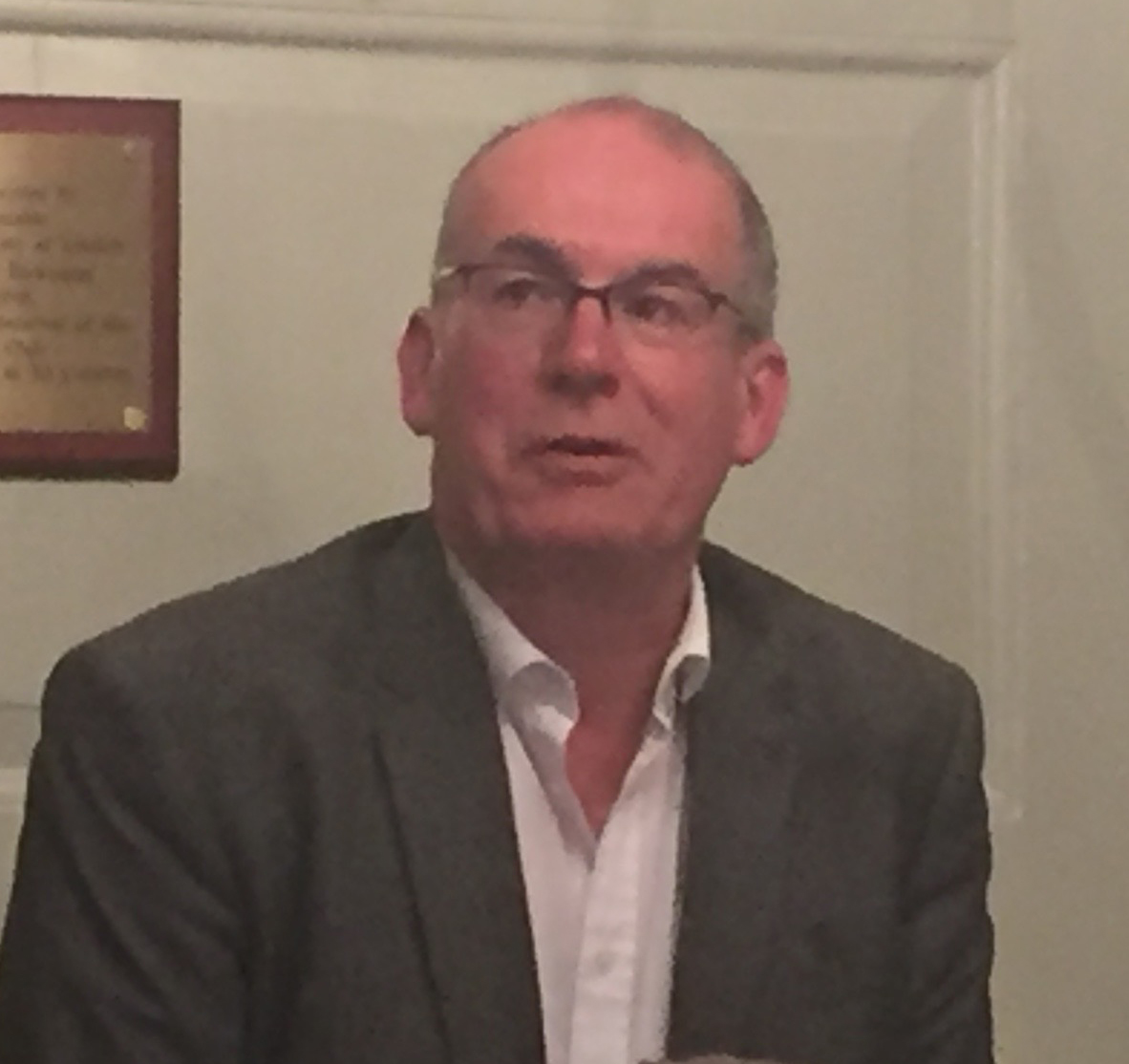
- Quantick at a BCA event in May 2018
- Born: 14 May 1961 (age 65); Wortley, West Riding of Yorkshire, England
- Occupations: Screenwriter; author; journalist; comedy writer; critic
- Years active: 1983–present

David Quantick (born 14 May 1961) is an English novelist, comedy writer and critic, who has worked as a journalist and screenwriter. A former freelance writer for the music magazine NME, his writing credits have included On the Hour, Blue Jam and TV Burp. He won an Emmy Award for Veep in 2015.

== Early life ==
Quantick was born in Wortley, West Riding of Yorkshire (now South Yorkshire) on 14 May 1961, adopted, and moved at an early age with his family to Plymouth. Quantick spent the 1970s in Exmouth. Quantick went to Woodford Junior School and Plymouth College, then Exmouth Comprehensive School.

He was born in 1961, in a mother-and-baby home in Wortley, Yorkshire. His mother lived in the Midlands and went to stay with an aunt In Derbyshire to conceal the fact she was pregnant. He was adopted by a family, who were living in Sheffield at the time and then moved to Plymouth.

Quantick studied for a law degree at University College London and "discovered I had no aptitude. They had these 'moot courts'—simulated a court hearings—and all I remember is dressing up in a cape like Batman." and took a Civil Service exam "to please my parents" and nearly failed"—"which was a shock".

"The school I went to has a mentor system. I was asked to go back and give a talk on 'having a dream'. I told them I believe strongly that you should not have a dream."

== Career ==
Quantick began writing for the music publication NME in 1983, where with Steven Wells he concentrated on comedy writing until 1995. Alongside this, he also contributed material to British comedy shows such as Spitting Image. In 1992, he joined the writing team for the Radio 4 spoof news programme On the Hour, before writing for the television follow-up The Day Today in 1994. He appeared regularly on Collins and Maconie's Hit Parade (Radio 1, 1994–1997), with his Quantick's World slot and on the weekly show, The Treatment on BBC Radio Five Live, which was an hour-long satirical news round-up.

In 1995, Quantick presented a pilot show called Now What? to Carlton Television but he series was not picked up for development. He wrote with Chris Morris for Brass Eye in 1996 (broadcast in 1997) and Blue Jam (Radio 1, 1997), as well as the subsequent television version Jam (Channel 4, 2000). He also provided material for Smack the Pony (Channel 4, 1999–2001), Harry Enfield's Brand Spanking New Show (Sky One, 2000), So Graham Norton (Channel 4, 1998) and featured on Radio 4's The 99p Challenge.

Working with Jane Bussmann, he co-wrote and performed Bussmann & Quantick Kingsize for BBC Radio 4 in 1998.

In 2000, Bussmann and Quantick created, specifically made for download over the web, what Quantick has claimed was the world's first internet sitcom and docusitcom (documentary/sitcom), The Junkies, about three heroin addicts. Starring Peter Baynham, Sally Phillips, Peter Serafinowicz, and Kevin Eldon in a cameo appearance, the writing pair claimed the project grew out of their frustration with the commissioning process. They argued the average sitcom cost £200,000 to make and was difficult to finance, so they secured the services of cast and crew on a voluntary basis and made a show for less than £4,000. The site received over a million visits in its first eight months of existence. The pilot was later uploaded to Quantick's YouTube.

In 2000, Quantick's biography of the Clash was published, with further books appearing in 2001. That year he collaborated with Andrew Collins and Stuart Maconie on Lloyd Cole Knew My Father, a live show about working as a music journalist. A performance was later broadcast on Radio 2 as a six-episode series. In 2003 and 2005, Quantick contributed material to sketch show That Mitchell and Webb Sound, five series of 15 Minute Musical (2004–08) and several series of Parsons and Naylor's Pull-Out Sections. He also made several appearances on Clive Anderson's radio panel show We've Been Here Before in 2003 and 2004.

In 2005, Quantick appeared in Channel 4's Come Dine with Me. Between 2003 and 2005 Quantick co-presented a weekly programme One Way Single Parent Family Favourites on London based community arts radio station Resonance FM. In 2006 he wrote and presented series 3 of 'The Blagger's Guide', a six-part comedy series on BBC Radio 2 and appeared as Doctor Dave Radio on Radio 2 comedy programme, Radio Rivron. Between 2001 and 2012 He was also part of the writing team of Harry Hill's TV Burp. Following its final series, Quantick contributed material to The Thick of It, helped write material for the comedian Rob Brydon, and recorded further editions of The Blagger's Guide for Radio 2 until 2014.

In September 2012, Quantick published an e-book novel, Sparks, which was positively reviewed by Neil Gaiman and Ben Aaronovitch. He produced a four-episode comedy series 52 First Impressions with David Quantick for Radio 4 in 2014 in which he recounted stories about 52 individuals he had encountered in his life/career. He received an Emmy in 2015 for his work on the HBO series Veep. That year he crowd-funded a novel The Mule via the Unbound company which was released on 25 February 2016. He had two writing manuals published with Oberon Books: How To Write Everything in 2015, then How to Be a Writer: Conversations With Writers About Writing the following year.

In April 2019, his novel All My Colors came out, described by the author David M Barnett as "a blend of Murakami-ish otherworldliness, Stephen King small town horror and Douglas Adams-esque absurdity."

In 2019, Quantick became a Visiting Professor with the University of Sunderland.

In 2022, Quantick's first movie, Book of Love, was released. It won Best Primetime Movie at the 2022 Imagen Awards.

== Personal life ==
Quantick has lived in East Sussex since about 2011.

== Bibliography ==
=== Fiction ===
- Sparks (10 September 2012, Kindle ASIN: B0098UTP5E)
- That's Because You're a Robot with Shaky Kane (Image Comics, 2014)
- The Mule (Unbound, 25 February 2016, ISBN 1783521007)
- Go West (Unbound, 24 January 2019, ISBN 1912618702)
- All My Colors (Titan Books Ltd, 16 April 2019, ISBN 1785658573)
- Night Train (Titan Books Ltd, 29 September 2020, ISBN 9781785658594)
- Ricky's Hand (Titan Books Ltd, 9 August 2022, ISBN 978-1803360461)

=== Short stories ===
- And Other Stories (Into Books, 7 August 2025, ISBN 978-1738514946)

=== Nonfiction ===
- Dress to Kill by Eddie Izzard, David Quantick et al. (Virgin Books, Hardback, 26 November 1998, ISBN 1-85227-763-7)
- The Clash (The Music Makers series) (MQ Publications Ltd, Paperback, 27 May 2000, ISBN 1-903318-03-3)
- Beck (Kill Your Idols series) (Avalon Travel Publishing, Paperback, 18 December 2000, ISBN 1-56025-302-9)
- Revolution: The Making of the Beatles' White Album (Vinyl Frontier series) (MQ Publications Ltd, Paperback, 26 September 2002, ISBN 1-903318-55-6)
- Grumpy Old Men (HarperCollins Entertainment), Hardcover, 7 June 2004, ISBN 0-00-718993-1)
- Grumpy Old Men on Holiday (HarperCollins Entertainment, Hardcover, 16 May 2005, ISBN 0-00-720185-0)
- Grumpy Old Men: New Year, Same Old Crap (HarperCollins Entertainment, Hardcover, 15 October 2007 ISBN 0-00-724333-2)
- The Dangerous Book for Middle-Aged Men: The Manual for Managing Mid-Life Crisis (Preface Publishing, Hardcover, 24 September 2009, ISBN 1-84809-200-8)
- Memoirs Of A Shoegazing Gentleman (Sonic Cathedral, 2014)

- Memoirs Of A Shoegazing Gentleman – 30th Anniversary Special Edition (SCR058) ISBN 1783191031)

- How To Write Everything (Oberon Books, 8 January 2015, ISBN 1783191031)
- How to Be a Writer: Conversations With Writers About Writing (Oberon Books, 13 October 2016, ISBN 1783199032)
- Quantick's Quite Difficult Quiz Book (Robinson, 4 November 2021, ISBN 1472146247)
