= Exmouth Community College =

Location
- Gipsy Lane; Exmouth, Devon, EX8 3AF; England
- Coordinates: 50.62715°N 3.40623°W

Information
- Type: Academy
- Local authority: Devon
- Department for Education URN: 136612 Tables
- Ofsted: Reports
- Headteacher: Tom Inman
- Gender: Mixed
- Age: 11 to 18
- Enrolment: 2,226
- Capacity: 2,850
- Website: https://www.exmouthcollege.devon.sch.uk/

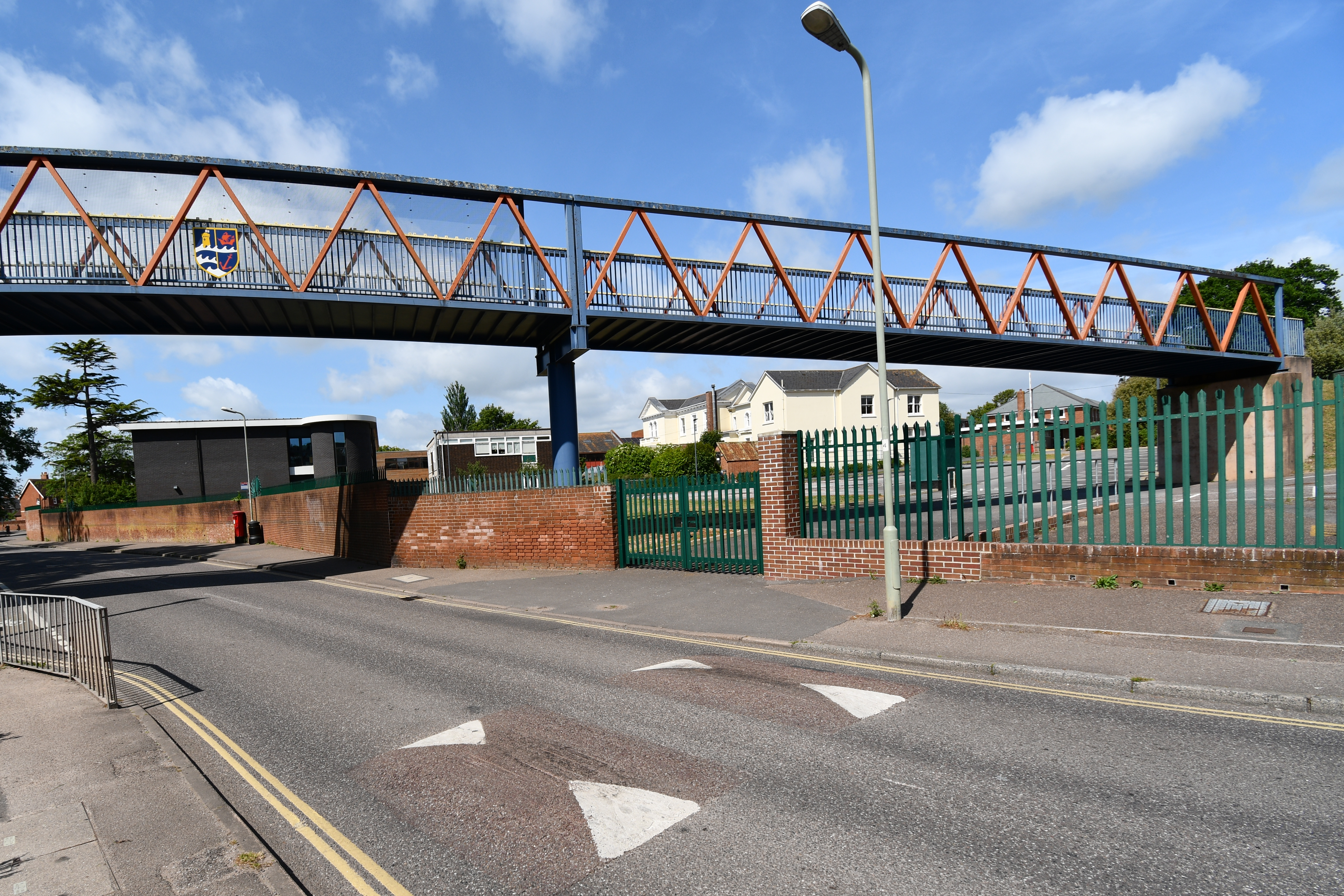
Walkway connecting Exmouth Community College's two sites

Exmouth Community College is an academy in Exmouth, Devon, England. The college provides secondary education for over 2,200 students, aged 11 to 18 across two sites. The headteacher is Tom Inman.

In March 2025 the academy joined the Ted Wragg Trust.

== History ==
=== Grammar school/Secondary Modern School ===
Exmouth Grammar School and Secondary Modern Schools were combined to create the comprehensive school in 1967.

=== Comprehensive ===
It became a comprehensive in 1967. In the early 1970s it was the largest school in England, with 2,470 students. In 2008 it was the third largest after Nottingham Academy and Ashfield Comprehensive School.

In 2023, Tom Inman became the new headteacher, replacing Andrew Davis. Davis had been headteacher since the departure of Tony Alexander in 2017.

== Curriculum ==
The college has taught computer studies at GCSE and A-level for a number of years. As well as offering the core curriculum with a choice between academic and vocational subjects, the college also offers an alternative curriculum, focusing entirely on workplace skills. The options available at Key Stage 4 are extensive, and include everything from Computer Science to Health and Care.

== Ofsted ==
The school's most recent full Ofsted inspection was in February 2024. All of the reports since November 2017 have cited that the school requires improvement in its overall effectiveness as a school; however, personal development, leadership and management, and sixth form provision were all rated 'good' in the latest report (2024).

== Sites ==
The college has two sites: on Gipsy Lane and Green Close. They are connected by a secured bridge. The Green Close site is primarily for Key Stage 3 (years 7 to 9) while the Gipsy Lane site caters for Key Stage 4 (years 10 to 11) and sixth form (Post-16). Both sites have undergone development, with the Turner Building (1997) and Pauline Hitchings Building (2005) opening on the Green Close site and the Judith Telfer Centre (1997) and a maths block on the Gipsy Lane site (2016).

== Notable former pupils ==
- Alistair Brammer, actor
- Jonathan Glanfield, Olympic sailor and silver medalist
- Kevin Hill, former professional footballer with Torquay United, leading the list of appearances for the club. 1997–2008
- David Fox, former Blackpool, Norwich City and Plymouth Argyle player.
- David Quantick, comedy writer and music magazine reviewer
- Wing Commander Nikki Thomas (1991–1996), the first female Wing Commander in the RAF, and the first female commander of an RAF fast jet squadron
- Matthew Wood, professional cricketer with Nottinghamshire
- Ben Lane, professional badminton player

=== Exmouth Grammar School ===
- Patricia Beer (1919–1999), poet and critic
- Squadron Leader Bill Langworthy AFC, pilot with the Red Arrows in 1966, and Red Pelicans from 1964–65
- Group Captain Bill Randle CBE AFC DFM FRAeS
