= The Worst Date Ever =

2009 memoir by Jane Bussmann

- Author: Jane Bussmann
- Language: English
- Genre: Gonzo journalism, memoir
- Published: 2009 (Macmillan)
- Publication place: United Kingdom
- Media type: Print (Hardcover)
- Pages: 371
- ISBN: 978-0-230-73712-9
- OCLC: 267172507
- Dewey Decimal: 070.92
- LC Class: DT433.227 .B87 2009

The Worst Date Ever or How it Took a Comedy Writer to Expose Africa's Secret War is a memoir written by the British comedy writer Jane Bussmann. The book exposes the war crimes and corruption of the Lord's Resistance Army and the Ugandan government army using black humour and gonzo journalism.

== Overview ==
After becoming frustrated with celebrity culture, Bussmann became inspired by the American peace activist and conflict resolution expert John Prendergast. Bussmann traveled to Uganda and began investigating the war crimes of Joseph Kony. Part investigative journalism, part dark comedy and part romantic satire, the story is couched in the author's unrequited attempt to get a date with Prendergast.

== Reception ==
Reviewers consistently found the book to be truly funny, although some believed that her use of comedy in horrific situations was frequently inappropriate.

In The New York Times, Daniel Bergner reported that John Prendergast enjoyed introducing himself to a person he spotted reading the book.
