= Second Class Male/Time to Go =

"Second Class Male" and "Time to Go" were a series of 12 spoof newspaper columns written by Chris Morris and Robert Katz under the pseudonym Richard Geefe in The Observer in 1999.

"Second Class Male" was a feature column written by a handsome though ineffectual sort who has a lack of luck in life. After the sixth article, the writer of the column decides that on a certain date he will commit suicide, and the rest of his columns, retitled "Time To Go", will be written about the state of mind of someone knowing they are going to die on a particular date. The last article, consisting of accounts by Geefe's dinner party guests on the night of his death, was published after Morris's co-authorship had been revealed.

The articles were presented as fact and not as a Chris Morris production, although the premise was very similar to a monologue from his Blue Jam radio programme, titled "Suicide Journalist" on the Blue Jam compilation CD. The last pseudonymous column included a man speared by frozen urine and a suicide by repeated jumps from a first floor window, both situations from earlier work by Morris.

The series attacked what some saw as the self-absorption of columnists writing about personal and domestic matters, and the quasi-fashion for columns about dying typified by those written by John Diamond and Ruth Picardie.

According to the IMDb a 7-minute short film (titled Second Class Male) based on the second column (in which Geefe gets locked out of his flat) was made in 2006.
