= My Wrongs 8245–8249 & 117 =

My Wrongs #8245–8249 & 117
- Directed by: Chris Morris
- Written by: Chris Morris
- Produced by: Mark Herbert
- Starring: Paddy Considine; Chris Morris
- Cinematography: Danny Cohen
- Edited by: Billy Sneddon
- Music by: Chris Morris; Adrian Sutton; Richard Hawley
- Distributed by: Warp Films
- Release dates: 14 November 2002 (premiere, London Film Festival); 24 February 2003 (DVD release)
- Running time: 12 minutes
- Country: United Kingdom
- Language: English

My Wrongs #8245–8249 & 117 is a 2002 British short film written and directed by Chris Morris. It stars Paddy Considine as a disturbed man taking care of a friend's dog (voiced by Morris), who convinces him that he is on trial for everything he has done wrong in his life. It was based on a monologue from Morris's BBC Radio 1 show Blue Jam.

My Wrongs was the first film released by Warp Films, an imprint of Warp Records. It was released on DVD in 2003, and won a BAFTA for best short film at the 2003 awards.

== Plot ==
A disturbed man (Paddy Considine) is housesitting for his friend Imogen. He takes her dog, Rothko (voiced by Chris Morris), for a walk. Rothko leads him to a park and kills a duck. As onlookers shout at the man, Rothko begins to speak to him, taunting him.

The pair escape on a bus, where the dog tells the man that he is his lawyer and is defending everything the he has ever done wrong. The man recalls a time when he was spoken to by a gerbil as a child, learning that his father was cheating on his mother.

The man and dog are removed by the conductor. The dog drags the man to a christening and instructs him to listen to the baby, who tells him to announce that the priest is a paedophile and the baby's mother is a prostitute. When the man does this, the baby says, "Only joking!"

In the commotion, the baby is sent flying. The man catches the baby and chases Rothko outside, where Rothko is hit by a car. Dying, Rothko tells the man to seek legal counsel from the baby. When the man asks to speak to the baby, the father punches him.

Some time later, the man leaves a note to Imogen apologising. He no longer goes to the park, as he hears the ducks tell passersby that he believes a dog could talk.

== Production ==
My Wrongs was based on a monologue from Morris's BBC Radio 1 show Blue Jam and was filmed with a budget of £100,000. It was the first release by Warp Films, an imprint of Warp Records. It is dedicated to the Warp co-founder Rob Mitchell, who died in 2001.

== Reception ==
The Guardian film critic Xan Brooks wrote that My Wrongs was a "direct descendent" of Blue Jam and Morris's satirical TV series Brass Eye, and that it could not have been made by anyone else. In the Telegraph, Mark Blacklock called it a "natural development" from Blue Jam and wrote: "Visually and sonically the film is well crafted. The light is cold, the sound morphed." He praised Warp Records as a "truly progressive organisation" that supported experimental artists such as Morris. My Wrongs won the BAFTA for best short film at the 2003 awards.
