= I Am Not an Animal =

British animated television series

- Cover of the DVD release
- Genre: Black comedy
- Starring: Steve Coogan; Amelia Bullmore; Julia Davis; Kevin Eldon; Arthur Mathews; Simon Pegg; John Shrapnel
- Country of origin: United Kingdom
- No. of episodes: 6

Production
- Running time: 30 minutes
- Production company: Baby Cow Productions

Original release
- Network: BBC Two
- Release: 10 May – 14 June 2004

I Am Not an Animal is a British animated black comedy television series telling the tale of highly intelligent animals rescued from a vivisectionist laboratory and forced to live on their own. The series was made and directed by Peter Baynham. It was produced by Baby Cow Productions and ran on BBC Two in the United Kingdom from 10 May to 14 June 2004. It has also aired on the ABC in Australia.

The title comes from the famous quote in The Elephant Man.

== Plot ==
In the laboratory Vivi-Sec UK, a group of six animals are part of the fourth batch of Project S, an experiment designed to create talking animals.

The animals are given a sophisticated lifestyle in order for them to develop their intellect, living a luxurious life run by computers in something similar to a four-star hotel, unaware they are really part of a laboratory experiment. They have human-like personalities and names, wear specially designed clothes, speak in a pseudo-intellectual fashion, eat gourmet food, drink fine wines, read books and magazines and generally live like humans in luxury. Meanwhile, the other animals outside Project S are tortured with horrific experiments.

The animals in the experiment include:

- Philip Masterson-Bowie the Thoroughbred horse (voiced by Steve Coogan)
- Winona Matthews the pit bull (voiced by Amelia Bullmore)
- Hugh Gape the Japanese macaque (voiced by Kevin Eldon)
- Claire Franchetti the rat (voiced by Julia Davis)
- Mark Andrews (aka Glen Belt) the sparrow (also voiced by Steve Coogan)
- Kieron the cat (voiced by Simon Pegg)

A group of animal rights activists break into the laboratory to rescue the animals. Kieron is left behind, having his head removed from the rest of his body and being kept alive by machines. As the other animals are boarded into the activists' truck they don't know what's going on, and are joined by Niall (voiced by Arthur Mathews), a rabbit from an earlier batch of Project S which can only speak computer advice.

When one of the animals asks the activists if they will be stopping for a toilet break, they panic and crash the truck into a tree. The animals escape, and go their separate way. After running into humans who are shocked, and other animals who can't speak as they do, they deduce they have somehow been transported into an alternative reality where only humans can speak and the other animals are enslaved by them (a reference to Planet of the Apes).

Meanwhile, Vivi-Sec UK graft Kieron's head onto the body of a gorilla and send him out to assassinate the other animals. Vivi-Sec UK also alerts the media that dangerous talking animals are on the loose.

The animals take shelter in an elderly lady's house, who calls her psychiatrist to tell him that there are talking animals at her house. Believing the elderly lady to have lost her mind, he has medics take her away, leaving the animals to live in her house. During the series, the animals try to interact with the world around them, to varying degrees of success or failure. At one point the animals discover that they were created in a lab and attempt to return. Upon breaking into the lab, they discover that they have already been replaced and that their replacements are more successful than they, as each replacement has managed to achieve one of the animals' fondest wishes such as Winona's desire for children. Realizing that they have no place left, the animals return to the old woman's home to live out their lives.

== Reception ==
Slate called it "a cheerfully sicko social commentary". Los Angeles Times called it "deep, dark and funny".

== Episodes ==
EP#	Title	Airdate
1	London Calling	10 May 2004
2	Planet of the Men and Women	17 May 2004
3	Money	24 May 2004
4	My Fair Mare	31 May 2004
5	A Star Is Hatched	7 June 2004
6	Home	14 June 2004
