= Big Train =

British sketch show

- Created by: Graham Linehan; Arthur Mathews
- Starring: Simon Pegg; Mark Heap; Kevin Eldon; Amelia Bullmore (series 1); Julia Davis (series 1); Rebecca Front (series 2); Tracy-Ann Oberman (series 2); Catherine Tate (series 2)
- Country of origin: United Kingdom
- Original language: English
- No. of series: 2
- No. of episodes: 12

Production
- Running time: 30 minutes
- Production company: Talkback

Original release
- Network: BBC Two
- Release: 9 November 1998 – 11 February 2002

Big Train is a British television sketch show created by Arthur Mathews and Graham Linehan. The first series was broadcast on BBC Two in 1998. The second, in which Linehan was not involved, aired in 2002.

== Overview ==
The series starred the actors Kevin Eldon, Mark Heap and Simon Pegg in both series one and two, with Julia Davis and Amelia Bullmore in the first series (Nick Frost also appeared in two episodes), and Rebecca Front, Tracy-Ann Oberman and Catherine Tate in the second series. All starred in a variety of other comedy shows including I'm Alan Partridge, Look Around You, Spaced, Smack the Pony, Brass Eye and Green Wing.

Tate went on to get her own show on the BBC, The Catherine Tate Show. The first series was directed by Graham Linehan. Other series contributors included David Mitchell and Robert Webb.

The pilot episode was directed by Chris Morris but was never broadcast in full. Some sketches from the pilot are scattered through the series. Apart from Pegg, all of the first-series regular cast members subsequently starred in Morris's sketch comedy Jam (2000).

The title of the show is derived from the song run during the credits, "Big Train", which was recorded by Max Greger and his Orchestra. The writers were fond enough of the song to name the show after it. The song has since been adopted for a commercial for Virgin Trains.

Both series were shot entirely on location (series one on 35 mm film and series two on DigiBeta) and later shown to a live audience so that a laugh track could be recorded.

== Comedy style and notable sketches ==
Following in the tradition of Monty Python, the comedy of Big Train is based on the subversion of ordinary situations by the surreal or macabre. For example, one scene features a bad-mannered man casually stabbed to death by his embarrassed wife at a dinner party. In a recurring sketch from the first series, an animated staring contest is accompanied by commentary from BBC football commentator Barry Davies and comedy actor and impressionist Phil Cornwell. The Stare-out Championship was based on a self-published comic book by Paul Hatcher and was animated by Chris Shepherd. The championship is portrayed as a huge event akin to the World Cup and the anecdotes told by the commentators often echoed those from real sporting events, such as performance enhancing drugs, streakers and the theft of the trophy.

Some other notable sketches included:

- A Ming the Merciless-style galactic despot that struggles to subjugate planets and imprison princes while doing the housework, checking his answerphone and being hospitalised after "slipping on the little mat that goes around the toilet"
- A romantic drama conducted entirely in French in which a woman has a relationship with a set of temporary traffic lights, much to the anguish of her human admirer
- "Fat handed twat" – A man with unfeasibly large hands who is ridiculed by members of the public when engaging in any kind of detailed work, such as embroidery
- An office manager who repeatedly distracts his employees—when they demand their promised overtime payment—with magic tricks, juggling and cute animals before running from the office, hailing a taxicab and flying away aboard an airliner
- An English tourist asking two Frenchmen for directions, only to have them nonchalantly respond, in perfect English, that they cannot understand her as they do not speak English
- A series of sketches in which 1970s and 1980s pop musicians were placed in unusual or surreal contexts (such as Kevin Rowland from Dexys Midnight Runners being reanimated as Frankenstein's Monster, Daryl Hall and John Oates acting as social workers, Keith Emerson as an Ancient Roman warrior — in a loose parody of the film Gladiator — and Chaka Khan as a Wild West bounty hunter pursuing the Bee Gees)

== Transmission details ==
Big Train originally aired on BBC Two on Monday nights during the following periods:

- Series one (6 episodes): 9 November – 14 December 1998
- Series two (6 episodes): 7 January – 11 February 2002

== Reception ==
Despite running for two series, Big Train attracted only a limited audience. Even so, the series was well received by critics, with the first series voted "Best 'Broken Comedy' Show" at the prestigious British Comedy Awards in 1999. The Independent called the show "divine". Reviewing the DVD, The Guardian wrote: "Like most sketch shows, Big Train is not without its misses, but as a breeding ground for comedy talent and a forefather to such modern-day hits as Little Britain and That Mitchell and Webb Look, it remains a gem, boasting some of the finest performances Pegg, Davis and the rest have ever delivered", whilst another author of the same publication called it "one of the most original and most consistently funny sketch shows in years".

== Home media ==
'The Complete Series 1 and 2' DVD has been released in the US and the UK.

From March 2021, both series became available on BritBox.
