= Amelia Bullmore =

English actress and screenwriter (born 1964)

- Born: Amelia Mary Bullmore; 31 January 1964 (age 62); Chelsea, London, England
- Occupations: Actress; Scriptwriter; Playwright
- Years active: 1987–present
- Spouse: Paul Higgins (m. 1993)
- Children: 2

Amelia Mary Bullmore (born 31 January 1964) is an English actress, screenwriter and playwright. She is known for her roles in Coronation Street (1990–1992, 1995), I'm Alan Partridge (2002), Ashes to Ashes (2008–2009), Twenty Twelve (2011–2012) and Scott & Bailey (2011–2014). Bullmore began writing in 1994. Her writing credits include episodes of This Life, Attachments, Black Cab, and Scott & Bailey.

== Early life and education ==
Bullmore was born in Chelsea, London, to Jeremy Bullmore, an advertising executive, and Pamela Bullmore (née Green), a gardening writer. She has two older brothers, including Edward Bullmore.

She studied drama at Manchester University.

== Career ==
=== Acting ===
Bullmore was part of a cabaret group named Red Stockings, along with Helen Edmundson. While performing at the Contact Theatre in Manchester, a casting director for Coronation Street saw her performance. Bullmore played Steph Barnes in Coronation Street, and was a regular on the show from February 1990 to September 1991. She made brief returns in April 1992 and September 1995. She worked and lived in Manchester for 10 years, moving to London in 1995.

Bullmore appeared in the first series of the BBC comedy series Big Train, broadcast in 1998.

Bullmore appeared opposite Steve Coogan as Sonja, the Ukrainian girlfriend of Alan Partridge in series two of the BBC2 comedy series I'm Alan Partridge. She also appeared on BBC Radio 4's phone-in spoof Down the Line.

From 2011 to 2014, Bullmore co-starred in the crime drama Scott & Bailey. She also wrote seven episodes of the show.

In 2016, she starred in the second series of Happy Valley, playing jealous mistress Vicky Fleming.

Bullmore plays Yvonne in the BBC One drama Riot Women. The show saw her reunite with Happy Valley writer Sally Wainwright.

=== Writing ===
In 2005, Bullmore wrote her first play, Mammals, which was staged at Bush Theatre and went on to tour the UK regionally.

In 2013, Bullmore wrote a second play, Di and Viv and Rose, which was staged at Hampstead Theatre. The play eventually transferred to the West End in early 2015, where it ran at the Vaudeville Theatre before closing in March.

== Personal life ==
In 1993, Bullmore married Scottish actor Paul Higgins. They met in Manchester in 1992 while they were performing A View from the Bridge. The couple have two daughters.

== Awards ==
Year	Award	Work	Result
1997	Writers' Guild of Great Britain Award for Best Original TV Drama Serial (shared)	This Life	Won
2005	Susan Smith Blackburn Prize (co-winner)	Mammals	Won
2009	Outer Critics Circle Award for Outstanding Ensemble Performance	The Norman Conquests	Won
2012	Writers' Guild of Great Britain Award for Best Television Drama Series (shared)	Scott & Bailey	Nominated
2013	Crime Thriller Awards Best Supporting Actress Dagger	Scott & Bailey	Won
2018	BBC Audio Drama Award for Best Supporting Actor/Actress	The Beard	Nominated

== Filmography ==
=== Film ===
Year	Title	Role	Notes
1997	Mrs. Dalloway	Rezia Warren Smith	
1999	The Comedy Trail: A Shaggy Dog Story	Horse Jockey	TV special
2002	Bookcruncher	Bookshop Manageress	Short film
2003	Hello, Friend	Friend	Short film
2005	Festival	Micheline Menzies	
2006	The Truth	Candy's Mother	
2009	Endgame	Gill	
2014	What We Did on Our Holiday	Margaret McLeod	
2018	Take Rabbit	Rabbit	Short film
2019	Motto	Linda	Short film
2022	Beware of Trains	Voice	Short film

=== Television ===
Actor
Year	Title	Role	Notes
1990–1992, 1995	Coronation Street	Steph Barnes	131 episodes
1991	Give Us a Clue	Herself - Contestant	1 episode
1993	Comedy Playhouse	Beth	1 episode: "Stuck on You"
1993	Cracker	Catriona Bilborough	2 episodes: "One Day a Lemming Will Fly": Parts 1 & 2
1994	Woman of the Wolf	Madame Plaisir	TV short film
1994	Faith	Ros	Mini-series; 4 episodes
1996	Frontiers	Caroline Poole	6 episodes
1997	Hetty Wainthropp Investigates	Karen Parmenter	1 episode: "Woman of the Year"
1997	Insiders	Paula Green	1 episode: "Guilty"
1997	Turning World	Social worker	2 episodes: #1.1 and #1.3
1997	The Bill	Tracy Cooper	1 episode: "In the Dark"
1997–2001	Brass Eye	Various roles	3 episodes: "Science", "Sex" and "Paedophilia"
1998, 2002	Big Train	Various roles	7 episodes
1999	Tilly Trotter	Eileen Sopwith	Mini-series; 2 episodes
1999	The Comedy Trail: A Shaggy Dog Story	Horse Jockey	TV Special
2000	Jam	Various roles	Mini-series; 6 episodes
2000	Attachments	Lin	1 episode: "Dot Bomb"
2001	Linda Green	Lucy Cooper	1 episode: "Rest in Peace"
2002	The Gist	Freda Cooper	TV film
2002	I'm Alan Partridge	Sonja	6 episodes
2003	Anglian Lives: Alan Partridge	Mary (voice)	TV film
2003	State of Play	Helen Preger	Mini-series; 6 episodes
2003	Coming Up	Psychiatrist	1 episode: "The Baader Meinhoff Gang Show"
2004	I Am Not an Animal	Winona the Dog (voice) / Additional voices	6 episodes
2005–2006	Donovan	Evie Strauss	3 episodes
2006	Sorted	Claire Hill	3 episodes
2006–2007	Suburban Shootout	Joyce Hazledine	11 episodes
2007	Director's Debut	Tara Vaughan	1 episode: "Baby Boom"
2007	Dalziel and Pascoe	Frances Cunningham	2 episodes: "Project Aphrodite": Parts 1 & 2
2007	The IT Crowd	Helen Buley	1 episode: "Smoke and Mirrors"
2008	The Whistleblowers	Helen Millard	1 episode: "No Child Left Behind"
2008	Mrs. In-Betweeny	Emma	TV film
2008–2009	Ashes to Ashes	Caroline Price	9 episodes
2009	Cutting Edge	Herself - Narrator	1 episode: "The Schoolboy Who Sailed the World"
2010	Bellamy's People	Various characters	3 episodes
2010	Agatha Christie's Poirot	Judith Butler	1 episode: "Hallowe'en Party"
2010	Little Crackers	Helen	1 episode: "Jo Brand's Little Cracker: Goodbye Fluff"
2011	Shameless	Mildred Fletcher	3 episodes
2011	Lewis	Caroline Hope	1 episode: "Wild Justice"
2011–2012	Twenty Twelve	Kay Hope	13 episodes
2011–2014	Scott & Bailey	DCI Gill Murray	30 episodes
2012	Sherlock	Dr Stapleton	1 episode: "The Hounds of Baskerville"
2013	Common Ground	Becky	1 episode: "Floyd"
2013	It's Kevin	Various roles	4 episodes
2015	Jekyll and Hyde	Renata Jezequiel	Mini-series; 3 episodes
2016	Happy Valley	Vicky Fleming	3 episodes
2016	Power Monkeys	Lauren	Mini-series; 6 episodes
2016	The Crown	Kathleen Sutherland	1 episode: "Assassins"
2018	Deep State	Olivia Clarke	4 episodes
2019, 2022	Gentleman Jack	Eliza Priestley	10 episodes
2019–2024	Vienna Blood	Rachel Liebermann	11 episodes
2021–2022	The Larkins	Miss Edith Pilchester	13 episodes
2022	I Hate You	Naomi	Mini-series, 1 episode: "Jazz"
2023	The Buccaneers	The Dowager Duchess of Tintagel	Main role; 6 episodes
2024	The Jetty	Sylvia	4 episodes
2025–present	Riot Women	Yvonne Vaux	6 episodes
Writer
1997	This Life	N/A	2 episodes: "When the Dope Comes In", "She's Gotta Get It"
1998	Big Train	N/A	Additional material (6 episodes)
2000	Jam	N/A	1 episode: "fussfussfussfussfussfussfuss"
2000	Black Cab	N/A	Ten 10-minute TV films (series deviser); 3 episodes: "Busy Body", "Marriage Guidance", "Tom & Marianne"
2000	Attachments	N/A	2 episodes: "Plug & Play" and "Hot Mail"
2012–2014	Scott & Bailey	N/A	7 episodes: "Sidelines" (2012), "Undermined" (2013), "Wrong Place, Wrong Time" (2013), "Superficial" (2014), "Tough Love" (2014), "Fatal Error" (2014), "Lost Loyalty" (2014)
2019–2022	Traces	N/A	10 episodes

== Theatre work ==
Actor
Year	Title	Role	Notes
1987	Breaking Rank: Oh Yes We Can by Helen Edmundson		Red Stockings Theatre Company (Manchester)
1988	Ladies in the Lift by Helen Edmundson	Sarah	Red Stockings Theatre Company (Manchester)
1989	The Red Balloon by Albert Lamorisse	Pascal	Contact Theatre (Manchester)
1989	Be Bop a Lula by Bill Morrison	Sharon Sheeley	Liverpool Playhouse (Liverpool)
1991	The Threepenny Opera by Bertolt Brecht		Birmingham Repertory Theatre
1992	A View from the Bridge by Arthur Miller	Catherine	Royal Exchange (Manchester)
1992	Romeo and Juliet by William Shakespeare	Lady Capulet	Royal Exchange (Manchester)
1992	Major Barbara by George Bernard Shaw	Barbara Undershaft	Citizens Theatre (Glasgow)
1992	Sweet Bird of Youth by Tennessee Williams	Heavenly Finley	Citizens Theatre (Glasgow)
1993	How the Other Half Loves by Alan Ayckbourn	Mary	Everyman Theatre (Cheltenham)
1993	All My Sons by Arthur Miller	Ann Deever	Everyman Theatre (Cheltenham)
1993	Inadmissible Evidence by John Osborne	Liz	Lyttelton Theatre (London)
1994	The Queen and I by Sue Townsend	Leanne/Trish	Royal Court Theatre (London)
1994	Road by Jim Cartwright	Louise/Linda/Claire	Royal Court Theatre (London)
1996	The Thickness of Skin by Clare McIntyre	Laura	Royal Court Theatre (London)
2004	Measure for Measure by William Shakespeare	Ensemble	The National Theatre (London)
2004	The Crucible by Arthur Miller	Elizabeth Proctor	Sheffield Crucible (Sheffield)
2008	The Norman Conquests by Alan Ayckbourn	Ruth	The Old Vic (London)
2009	The Norman Conquests by Alan Ayckbourn	Ruth	Circle in the Square Theatre (New York)
2010	Really Old, Like Forty Five by Tamsin Oglesby	Cathy	The National Theatre (London)
2015	A Christmas Carol		Noël Coward Theatre (London)
2018	Circle Mirror Transformation by Annie Baker	Marty	HOME (Manchester)
Playwright
2005	Mammals	N/A	Bush Theatre (London)
2007	Ghosts (Henrik Ibsen adaptation)	N/A	Gate Theatre (Dublin)
2011	Di and Viv and Rose	N/A	Vaudeville Theatre (London)

== Radio work ==
=== Actor ===
- 2012: "Sweet Tooth," Book at Bedtime, BBC Radio 4 – Sweet Tooth by Ian McEwan
- 2016: "Delamere's Meadow," First for Radio, BBC Radio 4 – Delamere's Meadow by Nina Stibbe
- 2017: "The Beard," Drama,BBC Radio 4 – The Beard by Timothy X Atack
- 2023: "A Single Act", Drama,BBC Radio 4 – A Single Act by A. L. Kennedy

=== Writer ===
- 2007: "Down the Line," BBC Radio 4 – January 2007
- 2007: "Cash Flow," From Fact to Fiction, BBC Radio 4
- 2009: "The Bat Man," Afternoon Drama, BBC Radio 4
- 2009: "The Middle," Saturday Drama, BBC Radio 4
- 2009-2014: "Craven," 15 Minute Drama, BBC Radio 4 – Series 1 (2009), Series 2, 3 & 4 (2012), Series 5 (2013), Series 6 (2014)
- 2007: "County Lines (radio play], " BBC Radio 4 – June 2018

== Works and publications ==
=== Plays ===
- Bullmore, Amelia (2005). Mammals. London: Methuen Pub. ISBN 978-0-413-77522-1. OCLC 82367220.
- Ibsen, Henrik; Bullmore, Amelia (new translation by) (2007). Ghosts. London: Methuen Drama. ISBN 978-0-713-68577-0. OCLC 891562141.
- Bullmore, Amelia (2013). Di and Viv and Rose. London: Bloomsbury Methune Drama. ISBN 978-1-472-50857-7. OCLC 843806192.

=== Radio ===
- Bullmore, Amelia (written by); Davis, Julia; McQuarrie, Stuart; Rabbit, Anne; Treves, Simon; Marinker, Peter (2007). "Cash Flow" (Radio program (15 min)). From Fact to Fiction. BBC Radio 4.
- Bullmore, Amelia (written by); Nighy, Bill; Parkinson, Katherine; Agutter, Jenny; Baker, Sean; Peate, Mary (directed by) (2009). "The Bat Man" (Radio program (45 min)). Afternoon Drama. BBC Radio 4.
- Bullmore, Amellia (written by); Peate, Mary (directed by); Cunniffe, Emma; Miles, Ben (2009). "The Middle" (Radio program (1 hr)). Saturday Drama. BBC Radio 4.
- Bullmore, Amelia (created by, written by); Peake, Maxine (2009). "Craven" (Radio program (15 min)). 15 Minute Drama. BBC Radio 4.
- Bullmore, Amelia (written by); Crook, Mackenzie (2011). "Family Tree" (Radio program (45 min)). Afternoon Drama. BBC Radio 4.
- Bullmore, Amelia (written by) (2012). "Craven: Looking for Mr King" (Radio program (45 min)). Afternoon Drama. BBC Radio 4.

=== Other writing ===
- Bullmore, Amelia (17 January 2015). "Amelia Bullmore: How I wrote my latest play with a little help from my friends". The Independent.
