= The Pilot Show =

- Created by: Paul Garner
- Written by: Paul Garner
- Country of origin: United Kingdom

Production
- Producer: Damon Beesley

Original release
- Network: Channel 4
- Release: 2004

The Pilot Show is a British TV comedy show written and created by Paul Garner. Commissioned by E4, premiering there in September 2003 and subsequently airing on Channel 4 in 2004, the show duped celebrities and members of the public into appearing on what they believed were pilots for real TV shows. The show featured Paul Garner, Sharon Horgan, Marc Wootton, Robin Ince, Rob Rouse and Steve Oram. It was produced by Damon Beesley and made for E4 by Ealing Studios.

Fake shows included The Spaceman, that would send the winner to the Moon, and Lapdance Island that saw as many as 20,000 British men apply to be on of ten stranded on an island with 40 lap dancers, who they would not be allowed to touch.

The Pilot Show went on to be remade for American television. VH1 in New York commissioned a 16-part series that first aired in May 2005. The show, renamed BSTV, was produced by Garner alongside Rob Moore from Ealing Studios and Jim Biederman for VH1. Garner and Marc Wootton were the only British cast members to feature in the U.S. remake.
