= Bergen Student-TV =

Norwegian local television station

Coordinates: 60.386641°N 5.323052°E

- Industry: Broadcasting
- Founded: 6 April 2003
- Founder: Henrik Hylland Uhlving
- Headquarters: Bergen, Norway
- Area served: Local
- Key people: Preben Ørpetveit Solberg (Editor-in-Chief)
- Website: bstv.no

Bergen Student-TV (BSTV) is a local community television station based in Bergen, Norway. The channel's main purpose is to deliver news and entertainment to students of Bergen. The employees are students, working voluntarily to get more media experience. Until 2009 BSTV had weekly shows on the local broadcaster BTV. The station also broadcasts some programs online. In addition, some of the material produced is sent on the national community TV network, Frikanalen.

The number of active members was around 80 in September 2011. The members are working with reporting, entertainment, photo and editing, multi-camera broadcast, web-design, graphics and public relations.

In the spring of 2011 bstv.no had 25,000 viewers.

In 2004 BSTV made national headlines when the host of the show appeared drunk on television.
