= Karpets =

Karpets is a surname. Notable people with the surname include:

- Artem Karpets (born 1984), Ukrainian-born Polish boxer
- Vladimir Karpets (born 1980), Russian cyclist
