= Wilfred Sanderson =

English composer

Wilfred Sanderson (1878–1935) was an English composer. He was organist and choirmaster of the Church of St. Stephen, Walthamstow, Essex from 1896, then the London Churches of All Hallows, Southwark from 1898. A well known work, The Glory of the Sea, recorded by the bass-baritone Peter Dawson in 1933, is a father's tribute to his son lost at sea.

== Works ==
- "As I Sit Here"
- "Beyond the Dawn"
- "Friend o' Mine"
- "God Be with Our Boys Tonight"
- "The Trumpet Call"
- "The Valley of Laughter"
- "Time to Go"
- "Until"
- "Up from Somerset"
- "The Carpet 1925"
- "Be Still, Blackbird!"
- "Shipmates o' Mine"
