= Chris Morris (satirist) =

English comedian (born 1962)

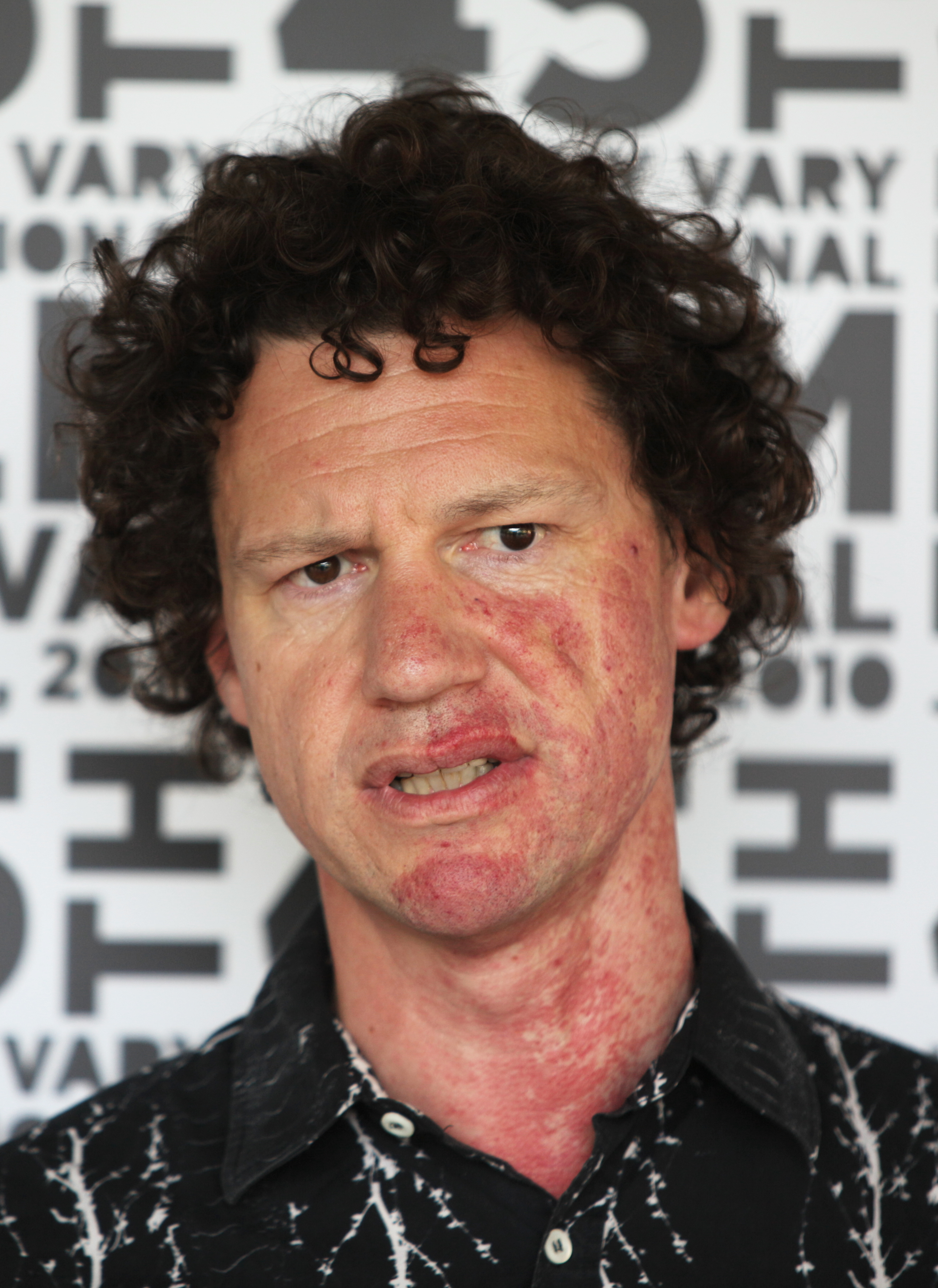
- Morris in 2010
- Born: 15 June 1962 (age 64); Buckden, Cambridgeshire, England
- Occupations: Comedian; satirist; radio presenter; actor; filmmaker
- Years active: 1986–present
- Spouse: Jo Unwin
- Children: 2
- Relatives: Tom Morris (brother)

Christopher J. Morris (born 15 June 1962) is an English comedian, satirist, radio presenter, actor and filmmaker. Known for his deadpan, dark humour, surrealism and controversial subject matter, he has been praised by the British Film Institute for his "uncompromising, moralistic drive".

In the early 1990s, Morris and Armando Iannucci created On the Hour, a satire of news programmes broadcast on BBC Radio 4. A television spinoff, The Day Today, launched the career of Steve Coogan and was hailed as one of the most important satirical shows of the 1990s. Morris developed the satirical news format with Brass Eye, which lampooned celebrities whilst focusing on themes such as crime and drugs. The Brass Eye episode "Paedogeddon", which satirised the moral panic surrounding paedophilia, became one of the most complained-about television programmes in British history.

Morris's postmodern sketch comedy and ambient music radio show Blue Jam gained a cult following. It was adapted into the TV series Jam, hailed as "the most radical and original television programme broadcast in years", and Morris won the BAFTA Award for Best Short Film after expanding a Blue Jam sketch into My Wrongs #8245–8249 & 117 starring Paddy Considine. Nathan Barley, a sitcom written with Charlie Brooker that satirised hipsters, had low ratings but success with its DVD release. Morris joined the cast of sitcom The IT Crowd.

In 2010, Morris directed his first feature-length film, Four Lions, which satirises Islamic terrorism. Reception was largely positive, earning Morris the BAFTA Award for Outstanding Debut. He directed four episodes of Iannucci's political comedy Veep and appeared in The Double and Stewart Lee's Comedy Vehicle, also serving as script-editor for the latter. His second feature-length film, The Day Shall Come, was released in 2019.

== Early life ==
Christopher J. Morris was born on 15 June 1962 in Buckden, Cambridgeshire, the son of Rosemary Parrington and Paul Michael Morris. His father was a GP. Morris has a large red birthmark almost completely covering the left side of his face and neck, which he disguises with makeup when acting. He grew up in a Victorian farmhouse in Buckden, which he described as "very dull". He has two younger brothers, including the theatre director Tom Morris. From an early age, Morris was a prankster and had a passion for radio. From the age of 10, he was educated at the independent Jesuit boarding school Stonyhurst College in Stonyhurst, Lancashire. He studied zoology at the University of Bristol, where he gained a 2:1-honours degree.

== Career ==
=== Radio ===
After graduating, Morris pursued a career as a musician in various bands, for which he played the bass guitar. He went to work for Radio West, a radio station in Bristol. He then took up a news traineeship with BBC Radio Cambridgeshire, where he took advantage of access to editing and recording equipment to create elaborate spoofs and parodies. He also spent time in early 1987 hosting a 2–4 o'clock afternoon show and, later, the Saturday morning show I.T..

In July 1987, Morris moved on to BBC Radio Bristol to present his own show, No Known Cure, broadcast on Saturday and Sunday mornings. The show was surreal and satirical, with odd interviews conducted with unsuspecting members of the public. He was fired from Bristol in 1990 after "talking over the news bulletins and making silly noises". In 1988, he also joined, from its launch, Greater London Radio (GLR). He presented The Chris Morris Show on GLR until 1993, when one show was suspended after a sketch was broadcast involving a child "outing" celebrities.

In 1991, Morris joined Armando Iannucci's spoof news project On the Hour. Broadcast on BBC Radio 4, it saw him work alongside Iannucci, Steve Coogan, Stewart Lee, Richard Herring and Rebecca Front. In 1992, Morris hosted Danny Baker's Radio 5 "Morning Edition" show for a week while Baker was on holiday. In 1994, Morris began a weekly evening show, the Chris Morris Music Show, on BBC Radio 1 alongside Peter Baynham and "man with a mobile phone" Paul Garner. In the shows, Morris perfected the spoof interview style that would become a central component of his Brass Eye programme. In the same year, Morris teamed up with Peter Cook (as Sir Arthur Streeb-Greebling) in a series of improvised conversations for BBC Radio 3 called Why Bother?.

=== Move into television and film ===
"If you make a joke in an area which is for some reason, normally random, out of bounds, then you might find something out, you might put your finger on something."

— Chris Morris

In 1994, a BBC Two television series based on On the Hour was broadcast under the name The Day Today. The Day Today made a star of Morris, and marked the television debut of Steve Coogan's Alan Partridge character. The programme ended on a high after just one series, with Morris winning the 1994 British Comedy Award for Best Newcomer for his lead role as the Paxman-esque news anchor.

In 1996, Morris appeared on the daytime programme The Time, The Place, posing as an academic, Thurston Lowe, in a discussion entitled "Are British Men Lousy Lovers?", but was found out when a producer alerted the show's host, John Stapleton.

In 1997, the black humour that had featured in On the Hour and The Day Today became more prominent in Brass Eye, another spoof of the current affairs television documentary, shown on Channel 4. All three series satirised and exaggerated issues expected of news shows with Brass Eye focusing particularly on moral panics. The second episode, for example, satirised drugs and the political rhetoric surrounding them. To help convey the satire, Morris invented a fictional drug by the name of "cake". In the episode, British celebrities and politicians describe the supposed symptoms in detail; David Amess even mentioned the fictional drug in parliament. In 2001, Morris satirised the moral panic regarding paedophilia in the most controversial episode of Brass Eye, "Paedogeddon". Channel 4 apologised for the episode after receiving criticism from tabloids and around 3,000 complaints from viewers, which, at the time, was the most for an episode of British television. The Daily Mail described Morris as "the most loathed man on TV".

From 1997 to 1999, Morris created Blue Jam for BBC Radio 1, a surreal, taboo-breaking radio show set to an ambient soundtrack. It was adapted for Channel 4 as Jam, broadcast in 2000. Morris released a "remix" version of this, called Jaaaaam.

In 2002, Morris directed the short film My Wrongs #8245–8249 & 117. It was the first release by Warp Films and won the 2003 BAFTA Award for best short film. In 2005, Morris worked on the sitcom Nathan Barley, based on the character created by Charlie Brooker for his website TVGoHome (Morris had contributed to TVGoHome on occasion, under the pseudonym "Sid Peach"). Co-written by Brooker and Morris, the series was broadcast on Channel 4 in early 2005.

=== The IT Crowd and Comedy Vehicle ===
Morris appeared in The IT Crowd, a Channel 4 sitcom that focuses on the information technology department of the fictional company Reynholm Industries. The series was written and directed by Graham Linehan (with whom Morris collaborated on The Day Today, Brass Eye and Jam) and produced by Ash Atalla. Morris played Denholm Reynholm, the eccentric managing director of the company. This marked the first time Morris had acted in a substantial role in a project that he has not developed himself. Morris's character was killed off during episode two of the second series. His character made a brief return in the first episode of the third series.

In November 2007, Morris wrote an article for The Observer in response to Ronan Bennett's article published six days earlier in The Guardian. Bennett's article, "Shame on us", accused the novelist Martin Amis of racism. Morris's response, "The absurd world of Martin Amis", was also highly critical of Amis; although he did not accede to Bennett's accusation of racism, Morris likened Amis to the Muslim cleric Abu Hamza (who was jailed for inciting racial hatred in 2006), suggesting that both men employ "mock erudition, vitriol and decontextualised quotes from the Qu'ran" to incite hatred.

Morris was a script editor for the 2009 series Stewart Lee's Comedy Vehicle, with Lee, Eldon and Iannucci. He maintained this role for the second (2011) and third (2014) series, also appearing as a mock interviewer dubbed the "hostile interrogator" in the third and fourth series.

=== Four Lions, Veep and other appearances ===
"I don't really see the point of comedy unless there's something underpinning it. I mean, what are you doing? Are you doing some kind of exotic display for the court, to be patted on the head by the court, or are you trying to change something?"

— Morris discussing the motives behind his comedy

Morris completed his debut feature film Four Lions in late 2009, a satire based on a group of Islamist terrorists in Sheffield. It premiered at the Sundance Film Festival in January 2010 and was short-listed for the festival's World Cinema Narrative prize. The film (working title Boilerhouse) was picked up by Film Four. Morris told The Sunday Times that the film sought to do for Islamic terrorism what the BBC sitcom Dad's Army for the Nazis by showing them as "scary but also ridiculous".

In 2012, Morris directed the seventh and penultimate episode of the first season of Veep, an Armando Iannucci-devised American version of The Thick of It. In 2013, he returned to direct two episodes for the second season of Veep, and a further episode for season three in 2014.

In 2013, Morris appeared briefly in Richard Ayoade's The Double, a black comedy film based on the Fyodor Dostoyevsky novella of the same name. Morris had previously worked with Ayoade on Nathan Barley and The IT Crowd.

In February 2014, Morris made a surprise appearance at the beginning of a Stewart Lee live show, introducing Lee with fictional anecdotes about their work together. The following month, Morris appeared in the third series of Stewart Lee's Comedy Vehicle as a "hostile interrogator", a role previously occupied by Iannucci.

In December 2014, it was announced that a short radio collaboration with Noel Fielding and Richard Ayoade would be broadcast on BBC Radio 6. According to Fielding, the work had been in progress since around 2006. However, in January 2015 it was decided, "in consultation with [Morris]", that the project was not yet complete, and so the intended broadcast did not go ahead.

=== The Day Shall Come ===
A statement released by Film4 in February 2016 made reference to funding what would be Morris's second feature film. In November 2017, it was reported that Morris had shot the movie, starring Anna Kendrick, in the Dominican Republic but the title was not made public. It was later reported in January 2018 that Jim Gaffigan and Rupert Friend had joined the cast of the still-untitled film, and that the plot would revolve around an FBI hostage situation gone wrong. The film, The Day Shall Come, had its world premiere at South by Southwest on 11 March 2019.

=== Music ===
Morris often co-writes and performs incidental music for his television shows, notably with Jam and the "extended remix" version, Jaaaaam. In the early 1990s, Morris contributed a Pixies parody track, "Motherbanger", to a flexi-disc given away with an edition of Select music magazine. Morris supplied sketches for British band Saint Etienne's 1993 single "You're in a Bad Way" (the sketch "Spongbake" appears at the end of the fourth track on the CD single).

In 2000, Morris collaborated by mail with Amon Tobin to create the track "Bad Sex", which was released as a B-side on the Tobin single "Slowly". Anglo-French band Stereolab's song "Nothing to Do with Me" from their 2001 album Sound-Dust features various lines from Chris Morris sketches as lyrics.

== Style ==
Ramsey Ess of Vulture described Morris's comedy style as "crass" and "shocking", but noted an "underlying morality" and integrity, as well as the humour being Morris's priority.

== Recognition ==
In 2003, Morris was listed in The Observer as one of the 50 funniest acts in British comedy. In 2005, Channel 4 aired a show called The Comedian's Comedian in which foremost writers and performers of comedy ranked their 50 favourite acts. Morris was at number eleven. Morris won the BAFTA Award for outstanding debut with his film Four Lions. Adeel Akhtar and Nigel Lindsay collected the award in his absence. Lindsay stated that Morris had sent him a text message before they collected the award reading, "Doused in petrol, Zippo at the ready". In June 2012, Morris was placed at number 16 in the Top 100 People in UK Comedy.

In 2010, a biography, Disgusting Bliss: The Brass Eye of Chris Morris, was published. Written by Lucian Randall, the book depicted Morris as "brilliant but uncompromising" and a "frantic-minded perfectionist".

In November 2014, BBC Radio 4 Extra broadcast a three-hour retrospective of Morris's radio career called "Raw Meat Radio", which was presented by Mary Anne Hobbs and featured interviews with Armando Iannucci, Peter Baynham, Paul Garner and others.

=== Awards ===
Morris won the Best TV Comedy Newcomer award from the British Comedy Awards in 1994 for his performance in The Day Today. He has won two BAFTA Awards: the BAFTA Award for Best Short Film in 2002 for My Wrongs #8245–8249 & 117, and the BAFTA Award for Outstanding Debut by a British director, writer or producer in 2011 for Four Lions.

== Personal life ==
Morris and his wife, actress-turned-literary agent Jo Unwin, live in Brixton, London. The pair met in 1984 at the Edinburgh Festival, when he was playing bass guitar for the Cambridge Footlights revue and she was in a comedy troupe called the Millies. They have two sons.

== Works ==
=== Film ===
Title	Year	Functioned as					Notes
Title	Year	Director	Writer	Producer	Appeared	Role	Notes
My Wrongs #8245–8249 & 117	2002	Yes	Yes		Yes	Rothko (voice)	Short film; also composer and sound designer
Four Lions	2010	Yes	Yes		Yes	Commentator on end credits (voice)	
The Double	2013				Yes	Workers' Services Executive	
The Day Shall Come	2019	Yes	Yes				

=== Television ===
Title	Year	Functioned as					Notes
Title	Year	Director	Writer	Producer	Appeared	Role	Notes
Spitting Image	1984		Yes				Episode: "#1.11"
Up Yer News	1990		Yes		Yes		
The Day Today	1994		Yes	Yes	Yes	Christopher Morris / Ted Maul / Various characters	6 episodes; also creator and composer
I'm Alan Partridge	1997				Yes	Peter Baxendale Thomas	Episode: "Watership Alan"
Brass Eye	1997, 2001		Yes	Yes	Yes	Christopher Morris / Ted Maul / Various characters	7 episodes; also creator and composer
Big Train	1998	Additional			Yes	Narrator of Jockey Doco (voice)	Episode: "Episode #1.2"
Jam	2000	Yes	Yes	Yes	Yes	Chris / Various characters	6 episodes; also creator and composer
Nathan Barley	2005	Yes	Yes		Yes	Place VO (voice)	6 episodes; also creator and composer
The IT Crowd	2006–2008				Yes	Denholm Reynholm	8 episodes
Stewart Lee's Comedy Vehicle	2009–2016		Yes		Yes	Interviewer	Script editor
Veep	2012–2014	Yes		Consulting	Yes	Newsreader (voice)	Directed four episodes, appeared in episode: "Full Disclosure"

=== Other ===
- Various works at BBC Radio Cambridgeshire (1986–1987) (presenter)
- No Known Cure (July 1987 – March 1990, BBC Radio Bristol) (presenter)
- Chris Morris (1988–1993, BBC GLR) (presenter)
- Morning Edition (July 1990, BBC Radio 5) (guest presenter)
- The Chris Morris Christmas Show (25 December 1990, BBC Radio 1)
- On the Hour (1991–1992, BBC Radio 4) (co-writer, performer)
- It's Only TV (September 1992, LWT) (unbroadcast pilot)
- Why Bother? (1994, BBC Radio 3) (performer, editor)
- The Chris Morris Music Show (1994, BBC Radio 1) (presenter)
- Blue Jam (1997–1999, BBC Radio 1) (writer, director, performer, editor)
- Second Class Male/Time To Go (1999, satirical newspaper column for The Observer)
- The Smokehammer (2002, website)
- Absolute Atrocity Special (2002, newspaper pullout for The Observer)
