= The Chris Morris Music Show =

- Running time: 60 minutes (9:00 pm – 10:00 pm)
- Country of origin: United Kingdom
- Language(s): English
- Home station: BBC Radio 1
- Hosted by: Chris Morris
- Original release: 1 June – 26 December 1994
- No. of series: 1
- No. of episodes: 24

The Chris Morris Music Show is a radio show that was presented by satirist Chris Morris and broadcast on BBC Radio 1 between June and December 1994. The show sparked controversy on several occasions, most notably when Chris Morris falsely announced the death of politician Michael Heseltine, which resulted in a two-week suspension of the show.

== Format ==
Each episode of The Chris Morris Music Show lasted approximately one hour, except for the final episode on 26 December 1994, which was two hours.

== Broadcast information ==
The Chris Morris Music Show was normally broadcast on Wednesday evenings between 9pm and 10pm. Episodes were aired each week between 1 June 1994 and 21 December 1994, with the exception of 13 and 21 July, when the show was suspended after the Michael Heseltine controversy. For some weeks, repeats were aired rather than new shows, such as when Morris was on holiday at the beginning of September.

== Premature obituaries ==
NEWSREADER: Tonight Jimmy Savile drops dead at a charity bash—the patients at Stoke Mandeville Hospital are not grieving. CORRESPONDENT: The majority, if not all of them, are extremely relieved that he’s now dead, although I suspect that some of them will be sorry that he didn't suffer a great deal more.

— The Chris Morris Music Show, 1 June 1994

In the first show, broadcast on the 1st of June 1994 Chris Morris falsely announced the death of television and radio personality Jimmy Savile. He then repeated this news bulletin, slightly altered to reflect the date, on the final episode on Boxing Day 1994. In response to the show, Savile sued the BBC and claimed that the false report had ruined his Christmas.

Morris attracted even more attention when he falsely announced another death, this time of politician Michael Heseltine on 6th July 1994. He made repeated reference to his possible or actual death throughout the episode, and solicited soundbites from several guests for his obituary, telling them either that Heseltine had died, or that he was preemptively preparing an obituary in anticipation of his death. It is often incorrectly asserted that Conservative MP Tory Jerry Hayes was tricked into believing Heseletine was dead and giving a live obituary, but he was in fact told to give a preemptive statement for the obituary, and from the audio it appears he is in on the joke. On the other hand, musician Bruce Foxton was told Heseltine was dead and appears to believe it and give a genuine obituary. Enough listeners were deceived and complained that the BBC suspended Morris, reinstating him after two weeks.
