= Jane Bussmann =

English comedian and author

Jane Bussmann (born 1969 in Marylebone, London) is an English comedian and author, who has written for television and radio. Her credits include The Fast Show, Smack the Pony, Brass Eye, Jam, South Park and Crackanory, as well as the radio series Bussmann and Quantick Kingsize with David Quantick.

Bussmann wrote and starred in "Bussmann's Holiday", a live one-woman show, directed by Sally Phillips, which played in Los Angeles, New York City and Edinburgh. The show was based on Bussmann's experience of following conflict negotiator John Prendergast to Uganda, which she has since written about in her darkly comic memoir The Worst Date Ever or How it Took a Comedy Writer to Expose Africa's Secret War, published in 2009.

Bussman has also written about the acid house scene.

Bussmann and Quantick also created The Junkies, the world's first internet sitcom.

== Bibliography ==
- Once in a Lifetime: The Crazy Days of Acid House and Afterwards, 1998, Virgin Books ISBN 0-7535-0260-7
- The Worst Date Ever: War Crimes, Hollywood Heart-Throbs and Other Abominations, 2009, Macmillan ISBN 0-230-73712-9
