= Brass Eye =

British TV series

- UK DVD cover
- Genre: Satire; Black comedy
- Created by: Chris Morris
- Directed by: Michael Cumming (Ep 1–6), Tristram Shapeero (2001 special)
- Starring: Chris Morris
- Country of origin: United Kingdom
- No. of episodes: 7

Production
- Running time: 25 mins
- Production company: Talkback

Original release
- Network: Channel 4
- Release: 29 January 1997 – 26 July 2001

Related
- The Day Today (1994); Jam (2000)

Brass Eye is a British satirical television series parodying current affairs news programming. A series of six episodes aired on Channel 4 in 1997, followed by a special episode, "Paedogeddon", in 2001. The series was created and presented by Chris Morris, directed by Michael Cumming and written by Morris, David Quantick, Peter Baynham, Jane Bussmann, Arthur Mathews, and Graham Linehan. Charlie Brooker would write for the 2001 special, which was directed by Tristram Shapeero.

== Overview ==
Brass Eye satirises media portrayal of social ills, in particular sensationalism and moral panics, and is a sequel to Morris's earlier spoof news programmes On the Hour (1991–92) and The Day Today (1994). It stars Morris, Doon Mackichan, Gina McKee, Mark Heap, Amelia Bullmore, Simon Pegg, Julia Davis, Claire Skinner, John Guerrasio, Hugh Dennis and Kevin Eldon.

Originally planned as a spin-off from The Day Today, the pilot (then called Torque tv™) was passed on by the BBC. Channel 4 commissioned a new pilot. The name Brass Eye mixes together the titles of two current affairs shows, (Brass Tacks and Public Eye) and is a euphemism for anus.

Each episode of the show has a similar structure, with Morris posing as various interviewers, campaigners and broadcasters as well as some of the subjects of the interviews. These segments are intercut with celebrities appealing on behalf of various nonprofit organizations with bizarre names and acronyms as well as fake news footage from various international broadcasters. Heavy use of elaborate graphical effects is used throughout.

=== Original series (1997) ===
"Animals"

The first episode, which uses much of the material filmed for the pilot centers on man's relationship with animals. In this episode Morris portrays a spokesperson from the "World Organization For Decreasing Captive Animal Problems" (W.O.F.D.C.A.P) which incorporates another organization, "Against Animal Anger And Auto-causal Abuse Atrocities in Zoos" (A.A.A.A.A.A.Z) who are trying to raise awareness of the plight of Karla, an elephant in a zoo in Germany and "Zoochosis" a condition which drives zoo animals insane. Jilly Cooper, Paul Daniels, Wolf, Britt Ekland, and Alexandra Paul appear either by phone or on video. Nicholas Parsons appears reading a poem supposedly written by Desmond Morris, while Carla Lane appears in a studio segment.

"Drugs"

The second episode, "Drugs", has been described by Michael Gossop as illustrative of the ease with which anti-drug hysteria can be evoked in the United Kingdom. In the opening scene of this episode, a voiceover tells viewers that there are so many drugs on the streets of Britain that "not even the dealers know them all". An undercover reporter (Morris) asks a purportedly real-life drug dealer in London for various fictitious drugs, including "Triple Sod", "Yellow Bentines" and "Clarky Cat", leaving the dealer puzzled and increasingly irritated until he asks the reporter to leave him alone. He also explains that possession of drugs without physical contact and the exchange of drugs through a mandrill are perfectly legal in English law.

One drug mentioned was a fictitious drug called "Cake", described as being from Czechoslovakia, despite the country no longer existing when the episode was screened. Morris poses as a campaigner from a pair of organizations, "Free The United Kingdom From Drugs" (F.U.K.D) and "British Opposition to Metabolically Bisturbile Drugs" (B.O.M.B.D) and seeks celebrities to appear on camera appealing to the public to be wary of Cake. The drug purportedly affected an area of the brain called "Shatner's Bassoon" (altering the user's perception of time), while also giving them a bloated neck due to "massive water retention", a "Czech neck", and was frequently referred to as "a made-up drug" (i.e. a designer drug) during the show. Other celebrities such as Sir Bernard Ingham, Noel Edmonds, and Rolf Harris were shown holding the bright-yellow cake-sized pill as they talked, with Bernard Manning telling viewers a fictitious story about how one girl regurgitated her own pelvis, and recounting that "one young kiddy on Cake cried all the water out of his body. Just imagine how his mother felt. It's a fucking disgrace".

David Amess, the Conservative Member of Parliament for Basildon, was fooled into filming an elaborate video warning against the dangers of this drug, and went as far as to ask a question about "Cake" in the UK Parliament, alongside real substances khat and gamma-hydroxybutyric acid. In response, the Home Office minister incorrectly identified the fictitious drug "Cake" as a pseudonym for the hallucinogenic drug methylenedioxybenzylamphetamine.

A pink version of the Cake pill can be seen during the opening credits, and director Michael Cumming explained it was a prop that Talkback had in the office from its previous appearance in an episode of Smith and Jones.

"Science"

The episode opens with an extract from "Future Imperfect?" – a Brass Eye Science Format in which Morris (in character as Paul Trott) and Eve Pollard warn the public against the dangers of weapons research causing birth defects, including one woman giving birth to an enlarged testicle approximately two feet in length. The episode sees science (represented by a test tube of blue liquid) in a courtroom trial for "going too far". A clip from a fake Australian science documentary talks of two mice "giving birth to a second" and scientists "blowing up" (destroying) "a fortnight". A fake American informercial is shown promoting a gymnasium implant for pregnant women. The episode is interspersed with "Good Science" and "Bad Science" segments hosted by Tania Bryer in which "vertical farms" are promoted to save space.

Another segment focuses on heavily indebted people being offered nominal sums for growing organs on their bodies. Various celebrity contacts are found in the Psion 3a personal organizer of one of the accused doctors including Jas Mann (who can be contacted via Vivian Stanshall) and Michael Jackson. This episode sees the campaign from the "Global Ensortium For A First World Initiative On Scientific Practice" (G.E.F.A.F.W.I.S.P) who enlist Richard Briers, Nick Owen, Steven Berkoff, Lynne Franks, Jenny Powell and Caesar the Geezer to make an appeal video focused on the dangers of "heavy electricity" hitting a Sri Lankan village.

"Sex"

Morris posed as a talk show host who took a starkly discriminatory attitude in favour of those with "Good AIDS" (e.g. from a contaminated blood transfusion) over those with "Bad AIDS" (caught through sexual activity or drug abuse).

"Decline"

This episode focuses on religion and moral decline. A play based on The Yorkshire Ripper is also highlighted, with Sutcliffe apparently being allowed out of prison to rehearse. The mid-episode commercial break is also interrupted by a fake newsflash from Channel 4 News with Doon Mackichan posing as a newsreader who announces that Clive Anderson has been murdered by Noel Edmonds.

This episode was heavily edited before broadcast and featured the infamous "Grade is a cunt" flash flame subliminal message. The DVD release adds much of the missing material back to the episode.

=== "Paedogeddon!" special (2001) ===
A special one-off edition of the show aired four years after the series had ended. Originally scheduled to broadcast on 5 July 2001, it was delayed as Channel 4 were unhappy with the timing in connection to the disappearances of 15-year-old Danielle Jones in June and 11-year-old Bunmi Shagaya in early July. It eventually aired on Thursday 26 July 2001, and was repeated the following day.

It tackled paedophilia and the moral panic in parts of the British media following the murder of Sarah Payne, focusing on the name-and-shame campaign conducted by the News of the World in its wake. This included an incident in 2000 in which a paediatrician in Newport had the word "PAEDO" daubed in yellow paint on her home. News of the World's then Editor Rebekah Brooks would years later discuss this campaign at the Leveson Inquiry.

To illustrate the media's knee-jerk reaction to the subject, various celebrities were duped into presenting fatuous and often ridiculous pieces to camera in the name of a campaign against paedophiles. Gary Lineker and Phil Collins endorsed a spoof charity, Nonce Sense, (pronounced "nonsense"—"nonce" being British slang for people convicted or suspected of molestation or sexual crimes), with Collins saying, "I'm talking Nonce Sense!" Tomorrow's World presenter Philippa Forrester and ITN reporter Nicholas Owen were shown explaining the details of fictional "Hidden Online Entrapment Control System", or HOECS (pronounced "hoax") computer games, which online paedophiles were using to abuse children via the internet.

Capital Radio DJ Neil "Doctor" Fox told viewers that "paedophiles have more genes in common with crabs than they do with you and me", adding "Now that is scientific fact—there's no real evidence for it—but it is scientific fact". At one point, bogus CCTV footage was shown of a paedophile attempting to seduce children by stalking the streets while disguised as a school.

Lineker described paedophile text slang, stating that "P2PBSH" translates to "pipe-to-pipe bushman; code for two paedophiles having sex with each other while watching children from a shrub" and "BALTIMORA" translates to "I'm running at them now with my trousers down". Labour MP Syd Rapson related that paedophiles were using "an area of internet the size of Ireland". Richard Blackwood stated that internet paedophiles could make computer keyboards emit noxious fumes to subdue children, subsequently sniffing a keyboard and claiming that he could smell the fumes, which made him feel "suggestible". Blackwood also warned watching parents that exposure to the fumes would make their children "smell like hammers". Other notable figures appearing as themselves were Sebastian Coe, Michael Hames, Andy McNab, Kate Thornton, Barbara Follett MP and Gerald Howarth MP.

Morris reported that convicted child murderer Sidney Cooke had been sent into space to keep him away from children. Prior to the launch, an eight-year-old boy had been placed on board the spaceship with Cooke by mistake, with a spokesman saying "this is the one thing we didn't want to happen".

During the programme, the studio was "invaded" by a fictional militant pro-paedophile activism organisation called "Milit-pede", and the programme appeared to suffer a short technical disturbance. When it returned, presenter Chris Morris confronted a spokesman, Gerard Chote (played by Simon Pegg), who had been placed in a pillory, asking if he wanted sex with Morris's six-year-old son (actually a child actor). Hesitantly, the spokesman refused, apologetically explaining "I don't fancy him". The episode won a Broadcast award in 2002.

=== Oxide Ghosts: The Brass Eye Tapes (2017) ===
In 2017, Michael Cumming released a 60-minute film of unbroadcast material from the making of Brass Eye between 1995 and 1997. The film is intended to mark the 20th anniversary of the series's original broadcast and includes scenes previously edited from the series due to time constraints or legal difficulties. It includes extended or alternative versions of scenes that made the final cut, together with humorous outtakes. Cumming narrates the film and details his first meeting with Chris Morris and the difficulties involved in making the series. Comedy website Chortle described the film as "a thoughtful, curiously touching time capsule which pays fulsome tribute to, and certainly never cheapens, the spirit of the original show".

The film premiered at the Pilot Light TV festival in May 2017 and toured to perform at selected UK cinemas throughout 2017. Each performance was followed by a Q&A with the director. It toured again in 2022. Cumming said that the film will only be shown at such public events and would never be released commercially, largely for rights and legal reasons.

In 2026, Cumming started showing occasional unseen small clips and various pieces of production information from the show, alongside commentary on his social media channels.

== Episodes ==
=== Series 1 (1997) ===
No.	Title	Directed by	Written by	Original release date
1	"Animals"	Michael Cumming	Christopher Morris	29 January 1997
The proliferation of cruel anti-cow graffiti, with text specifically designed to undermine the animals' confidence, and a spate of arranged fights between large men and weasels, indicate a deep malaise at the heart of society. Chris Morris presents a mix of surprising celebrity interviews and startling sketches on the issue of animal cruelty, focusing on Karla the elephant, who has unfortunately trapped her trunk up her anus.
2	"Drugs"	Michael Cumming	Christopher Morris	5 February 1997
'Cake', a deadly new killer drug from Prague, is about to take Britain by storm. Our only hope for saving the nation's youth from the horrors of `Czech Neck' is an intensive awareness campaign, featuring the influential voices of Bernard Manning and Noel Edmonds.
3	"Science"	Michael Cumming	Christopher Morris with Peter Baynham	12 February 1997
Chris Morris shakes his head in despair as more hoodwinked celebrities pass on their fairly loose grasp of bizarre science stories and experiments, including a campaign against 'heavy electricity'.
4	"Sex"	Michael Cumming	Christopher Morris	19 February 1997
Chris Morris casts a satirical eye over the subject of sex and its relationship to society. Helpful contributors include Peter Stringfellow and David Sullivan.
5	"Crime"	Michael Cumming	Christopher Morris	26 February 1997
Chris Morris turns his laser eye to the subject of crime, including shocking revelations of how elephants are being used to disperse rioters, and Vanessa Feltz's message to murderers.
6	"Decline"	Michael Cumming	Christopher Morris	5 March 1997
Chris Morris examines the issue of moral decline in Britain. Religion also falls under the spotlight in this episode, which features Terry Waite discussing how Britain has been poisoned by the gospel.

=== Special (2001) ===
No.	Title	Directed by	Written by	Original release date
7	"Paedogeddon!"	Tristram Shapeero	Christopher Morris, Shane Allen & Peter Baynham	26 July 2001
In this episode, celebrities were this time duped into endorsing an anti-paedophile charity by denouncing a program in which paedophiles could view children through a webcam and, wearing special gloves allowing them to molest any part of the child they so wished by simply touching their monitor.

== Controversies ==
=== Postponement ===
The series had originally been scheduled to air in November 1996, but was postponed and ultimately aired in January 1997. According to Channel 4, this delay was to ensure that broadcasting standards were met, amid fears that some of the series' pranks might violate the Independent Television Commission's code on hoaxes. Two days before airing, the show had been denounced by Tom Sackville, a minister at the Home Office, who criticised "this waste of Home Office time", referring to the programme's 'Cake' hoax which involved Sackville and MP David Amess.

The Guardian reported that the postponement was the subject of internet speculation on at least 112 different websites, which featured conspiracy theories that Channel 4 had given into pressure from the Home Office, or that the programme had been pulled by the then chief executive of Channel 4, Michael Grade, owing to the negative effect it might have had on the channel's upcoming campaign against privatisation. In January 1997, it was announced that the series would be broadcast, and would begin airing later in the month. After airing, the programme attracted complaints from MPs David Amess and Sir Graham Bright concerning their appearances on the show involving 'cake', which were upheld by the Independent Television Commission. The commission also went "out of its way" to praise the series as "amusing and innovative".

While the ITC's television code included a provision that "contributors must be made aware of the format and purpose of programmes", the response to the complaints clarified that "The Commission had no criticism of the overall programme concept. It acknowledged that risks were attached to making innovative programmes and felt that Channel 4 should not be discouraged for that reason from seeking to make such programmes. It proposed to take no further action against Channel 4."

=== Michael Grade ===
Michael Grade, then chief executive of Channel 4, repeatedly intervened to demand edits to episodes of Brass Eye. The final episode included a single-frame subliminal message reading "Grade is a cunt".

=== "Paedogeddon!" ===
Around 3,000 complaints were received concerning "Paedogeddon!", making it reportedly the most objected-to episode in British television history at the time, and politicians spoke out against Morris. Minister for Child Protection Beverley Hughes described the show as "unspeakably sick" based on clips of the episode. Home Secretary David Blunkett was described by a spokesman as "dismayed", although he may have been relying on a description of the episode. Tessa Jowell, after watching, asked the Independent Television Commission to change its procedures so it could rule more swiftly on similar programmes.

There was a tabloid campaign against Morris, who refused to discuss the issue. The Daily Star decried Morris and the show. The Daily Mail ran a headline describing Brass Eye as "Unspeakably Sick", quoting Beverley Hughes. The Observer accused both papers of hypocrisy; it noted that the Star article was positioned adjacent to an article about the developing bust of 15-year-old singer Charlotte Church, and that the Mail's coverage was preceded by "close-ups" of the "bikini princesses" Beatrice and Eugenie, who were 12 and 11 at the time.

Columnist for The Guardian Ros Coward wrote at the end of July 2001: "What's so dishonest about Channel 4's defence of Brass Eye as a satire of media forms is the implication that they (and the liberal left in general) have a better truth than the tabloids. They don't. ... [I]t suggests concern about sex abuse is exaggerated and that victims' shame and humiliation doesn't matter. That's why there were so many complaints."

== Home media ==
A DVD released in 2001 reinstated most of the material cut from the original. A few items were removed, most notably the subliminal messages directed at Michael Grade and an interview with Graham Bright MP in the "Drugs" episode. A disclaimer was added to the "Drugs" episode at the request of David Amess.
