= 2004: The Stupid Version =

- Genre: Mock reality
- Created by: Armando Iannucci
- Written by: Armando Iannucci; Stewart Lee; Simon Blackwell; Mick Bunnage; Adam Buxton; Roger Drew; Jon Link; Adrian Peters; David Quantick; Will Smith; David Wellington
- Directed by: Armando Iannucci
- Starring: Armando Iannucci; Stewart Lee; Richard Ayoade; Adam Buxton; Matthew Holness; David Quantick; John Biggins; John Guerrasio; Carol Harvey; Andy Hodgson; Melanie Hudson; Lewis MacLeod; Kate O'Sullivan; David Robb
- Country of origin: United Kingdom
- Original language: English
- No. of seasons: 1
- No. of episodes: 1

Production
- Producer: Adam Tandy
- Running time: 60:00

Original release
- Network: BBC Three
- Release: 31 December 2004

2004: The Stupid Version is a satirical documentary written by Armando Iannucci, broadcast on BBC Three on New Year's Eve 2004. The one-off programme is a parody of review programmes, which are typically broadcast at New Year. It features edited footage from news and television series, as well as satires on the politics and fads of a year in which "only Andrew Marr kept his dignity".

The documentary was shown again on BBC Two on 29 January 2005, but has not been repeated since or released on DVD, although clips are available on the internet. Iannucci's other series Time Trumpet (2006) follows a similar format to The Stupid Version, reviewing events satirically from a future perspective.

== Format ==
Iannucci himself narrated the content, but only appears on screen once to assess the aftermath of The Room Show, a spoof of the reality television shows prevalent at the time, in which Ian McCaskill, Eddie 'the Eagle' Edwards and a number of other minor celebrities were locked in an (unfilmed) container for ten hours.

In particular, the show focuses on stories that made the headlines from 2004, for example the US Presidential Election, featuring edited footage showing George W. Bush singing “New York, New York” during a presidential head to head, and an montage of election speeches emphasising the buzz words used by Bush's campaign.

In addition, the programme satirised politics in the United Kingdom, for example, edits of Tony Blair and Gordon Brown apparently contradicting one another, the favourite swear words of politicians in the Conservative Party, and the controversial documentary by Panorama, "Where the Tits were Saddam's WMD?”

The programme also features a series of banal interviews interspersed with the clips, with the interviewees either misunderstanding or misinterpreting their content; "The Olympics – what was all that about?” In reality, these were actors Richard Ayoade, Matthew Holness, Adam Buxton and Stewart Lee.

Television programmes by the BBC which were spoofed included Johnny & Denise: Passport to Paradise, Hard Spell, The Weakest Link and Alan Titchmarsh's British Isles: A Natural History. Other scenes included a world where every object was in the style of an iPod, a dubbed News 24 interview with the editor of Al Jazeera and a parody of the song by The Streets, “Dry Your Eyes” (featuring Buxton as the protagonist).
