= Elizabeth Bell (actress) =

English actress

- Born: 20 March 1941; Leeds, West Riding of Yorkshire, England
- Died: 21 October 2012 (aged 71); London, England
- Education: Royal Central School of Speech and Drama
- Occupation: Actress
- Spouse: Henry Osborne (m. 2011)

Elizabeth Bell (20 March 1941 – 21 October 2012) was an English stage and television actress.

== Early life ==
Bell was born in 1941 in Leeds, West Riding of Yorkshire, the daughter of Elizabeth and Neil Bell. The family moved to Scarborough, North Riding of Yorkshire when she was four, after her father left. She attended the girls' high school there. She then decided to attend Central School of Speech and Drama in London. In 1971 she was living with the architect Henry Osborne, and they were married in 2011. She died of oesophageal cancer on 21 October 2012.

== Acting career ==
Her career was closely associated in particular with Alan Ayckbourn whom she knew from her early work in Scarborough to being her neighbour in London.

Bell appeared with English Stage Company at the Royal Court Theatre, the National theatre, the Almeida, the Pleasance, the Bush and in the West End. She appeared in the first season of the dedicated Theatre in the round at Stoke-on-Trent. Bell was also a regular on television and in radio productions. She was a founder member of the Victoria theatre, which is now known as the New Vic.

Bell went on to become a mentor for Central School students as well as an external examiner for Trinity College London.

== Awards and criticism ==
1961 The gold medal and Sybil Thorndike prize, Central School of Speech and Drama, London

Alan Ayckbourn said of her:

To act with, she was a joy. To direct, she was often challenging, forever questioning, not content to accept things purely on face value and, like any good actor, never settling for anything less than dramatic truth. If that makes her sound a tough proposition, then once her questions were answered, doubts reassured, she was fiercely loyal to you and the production.

== Stage ==
- 1966 Beset by Women in the Prince of Wales Theatre
- 1970 The Soldier’s Fortune in the Royal Court Theatre
- 1987 A View from the Bridge at The National Theatre
- 1989 The Revengers' Comedies at the theatre in the round at Scarborough
- 1990 Othello in Scarborough
- 1992 Euripides’ Medea at Almeida Theatre
- 1996 Goldhawk Road at Bush Theatre
- 1998 Richard III at The Pleasance
- 2005 The UN Inspector at The National Theatre
- 2007 The History Boys for the NT at Wyndham's Theatre

== Filmography ==
=== Film ===
- 1998 Clinton: His Struggle with Dirt (TV Short)
- 1981 Hedda Gabler (TV Movie)
- 1976 Buns for the Elephant (TV Movie)

=== Television ===
- 2010 Midsomer Murders (TV Series)
- 2004-2008 Doctors (TV Series)
- 2008 Heartbeat (TV Series)
- 1997-2007 Casualty (TV Series)
- 2002 Foyle's War (TV Series)
- 2001 The Bill (TV Series)
- 1999 Wing and a Prayer (TV Series)
- 1987 The Diary of Anne Frank (TV Series) as Edith Frank
- 1986 Screen Two (TV Series)
- 1986 Lytton's Diary (TV Series)
- 1985 Juliet Bravo (TV Series)
- 1973-1984 Play for Today (TV Series)
- 1981 Prisoners of Conscience (TV Series)
- 1980 Premiere (TV Miniseries)
- 1980 BBC2 Playhouse (TV Series)
- 1977 Rooms (TV Series)
- 1976 Scene (TV Series documentary)
- 1976 Centre Play (TV Series)
- 1974-1976 Crown Court (TV Series)
- 1975 Churchill's People (TV Series)
- 1974 Melissa (TV Miniseries)
- 1974 Masquerade (TV Series)
- 1974 Within These Walls (TV Series)
- 1973 Softly, Softly: Task Force (TV Series)
- 1973 Once Upon a Time (TV Series)
- 1973 Late Night Theatre (TV Series)
- 1973 Harriet's Back in Town (TV Series)
- 1969-1972 Thirty-Minute Theatre (TV Series)
- 1972 Man of Straw (TV Miniseries) as Emmi Hessling
- 1971 Justice (TV Series)
- 1971 Trial (TV Series)
- 1971 Out of the Unknown (TV Series)
- 1971 Pinocchio
- 1970 The Six Wives of Henry VIII (TV Miniseries)
- 1969 Special Project Air (TV Series)
- 1969 Boy Meets Girl (TV Series)
- 1969 Callan (TV Series)
- 1968 The Jazz Age (TV Series)
- 1968 Sexton Blake (TV Series) as Julia Mangini
- 1967 Seven Deadly Virtues (TV Series)
- 1966 Dixon of Dock Green (TV Series)
- 1966 Thirteen Against Fate (TV Series)
- 1966 The Wednesday Play (TV Series)
- 1965 ITV Play of the Week (TV Series)
- 1965 Z Cars (TV Series)
- 1965 The Troubleshooters (TV Series)
- 1965 Cluff (TV Series)
- 1965 The Scarlet and the Black (TV Series)
- 1964 Esther Waters (TV Series) as Sarah
- 1964 Detective (TV Series)
