= John Guerrasio =

American actor

John Guerrasio (born January 1, 1950 in New York City, New York) is an American stage, film and TV actor, based in the United Kingdom. He is known for having a broad New York accent. In his review of Love Birds, Bernie Byrnes of Loose-Lips.com wrote, "John Guerrasio is ideal casting….He delivers his role with expert timing and rules the stage."

== Career ==
=== Theatre ===
==== United Kingdom ====
Year	Title	Role	Notes
1999	The Man Who Came to Dinner	Banjo	Chichester Festival Theatre
2000	Pal Joey	Ludlow Lowell	Minerva Studio Theatre, Chichester
2011	Columbo: Prescription Murder	Lt. Columbo	Middle Ground Theatre
2014	Merman's Apprentice	Moe	Landor Theatre, London
2015	Love Birds	Armitage Shanks	The Pleasance, Edinburgh

==== New York ====
Year	Title	Role	Notes
1970	Hamlet	Performer	Off-Broadway
1976	Paradise	Performer	Off-Broadway
1979	Family Business	Performer	Off-Broadway
1988	The Imperialist at the Club Cave Canem	Performer	Off-Broadway

=== Film and television ===
Year	Title	Role	Notes
1980	Jane Austen in Manhattan	Gregory	Film
1992	Leon the Pig Farmer	Jimmy's Men	Film
1993	Sweating Bullets	Meeker	TV series; episode: "Katie's Secret"
1994	As Time Goes By	Josh	TV series; episode: "A Trip to Los Angeles"
1994	Strange But True?	Reconstruction Actor	TV series; episode: "The Rendlesham Incident"
1995	Intimate with a Stranger	KLOV Radio DJ	Film
1997	Brass Eye		TV series; episode: "Crime"
1997	McLibel!	Stan Stein	TV mini-series; episode 1.2
1998	A Knight in Camelot	Bob	TV film
2000	My Hero	Arnie's Customer	TV series; episode: "Guess Who's Coming To Lunch"
2001	The Armando Iannucci Shows		TV series; episode: "Reality"
2003	Cambridge Spies	Gen. Walter Bedell Smith	TV mini-series; episode 1.4
2003	3 Blind Mice	3rd Exec (American)	Film; uncredited
2003	Spine Chillers	Nervous Man	TV series; episode: "Fairy Godfather"
2003	Seven Wonders of the Industrial World	Marion Allen, Dam Worker	TV series; episode: "The Hoover Dam"
2004	2004: The Stupid Version	Himself	TV film
2005	Sea of Souls	1950s Newscaster	TV series; episodes: "Amulet: Part 1" and "Amulet: Part 2"
2006	Medical Mavericks	Himself	TV mini-series
2008	Kill Kill Faster Faster	Joe's Father	Film
2012	Titanic: Case Closed	Colonel Gracie	TV film documentary
2012	Time Traveller Guides 3D	Film Narration	TV series; one episode
2012	Facejacker	Writer	TV series
2013	Nixon's the One	Oral Roberts	TV series; episode: "Religion"
2013	Toast of London	Howard Bugowitz	TV series; episode: "Vanity Project"
2014	Casualty	Eduardo Ponzini	TV series; episode: "The Family Way"
2015	Woman in Gold	Court House Employee	Film
2015	Asylum	Mo	TV series; episodes: "Public Relations", "Project Siren" and "Strange Bedfellows"
2016	Florence Foster Jenkins	Vendor	Film
2018	A Christmas Prince: The Royal Wedding	Rudy	Film
2019	A Christmas Prince: The Royal Baby	Rudy	Film

=== Video games ===
Year	Title	Role	Notes
2001	Desperados: The Shadow of El Diablo	Sanchez	English version; voice
2002	Island Xtreme Stunts	The Brickster	English version; voice
2004	Sacred		English version; voice
2005	Pac-Man World 3	Clyde / The Fiend / Construction Worker / Archaeologist	Voice
2005	Sacred Underworld		English version; voice
2005	Spartan: Total Warrior	Additional Voices	
2005	Kameo: Elements of Power	Warrior Trainer	Voice
2005	Perfect Dark Zero	Jack Dark / Ziegler	Voice
2009	Killzone 2	Additional ISA Voices	
2009	G-Force		Voice
2010	Kinect Sports	Additional Voices	English version
2011	Driver: San Francisco	Additional Voices	
2013	Lego City Undercover	Vinnie Pappalardo	Voice
2014	LittleBigPlanet 3	Guard 1 / Guard 2	Voice
2014	The Crew		Voice
2014	Randal's Monday	Marconi	Voice
2015	Blues and Bullets	Al Capone	Voice
