= Time Passing =

Time Passing may refer to:

- Time Passing (album), a compilation album by David Foster
- "Time Passing" (The Armando Iannucci Shows), a television episode
