= David Schneider (actor) =

English actor (born 1963)

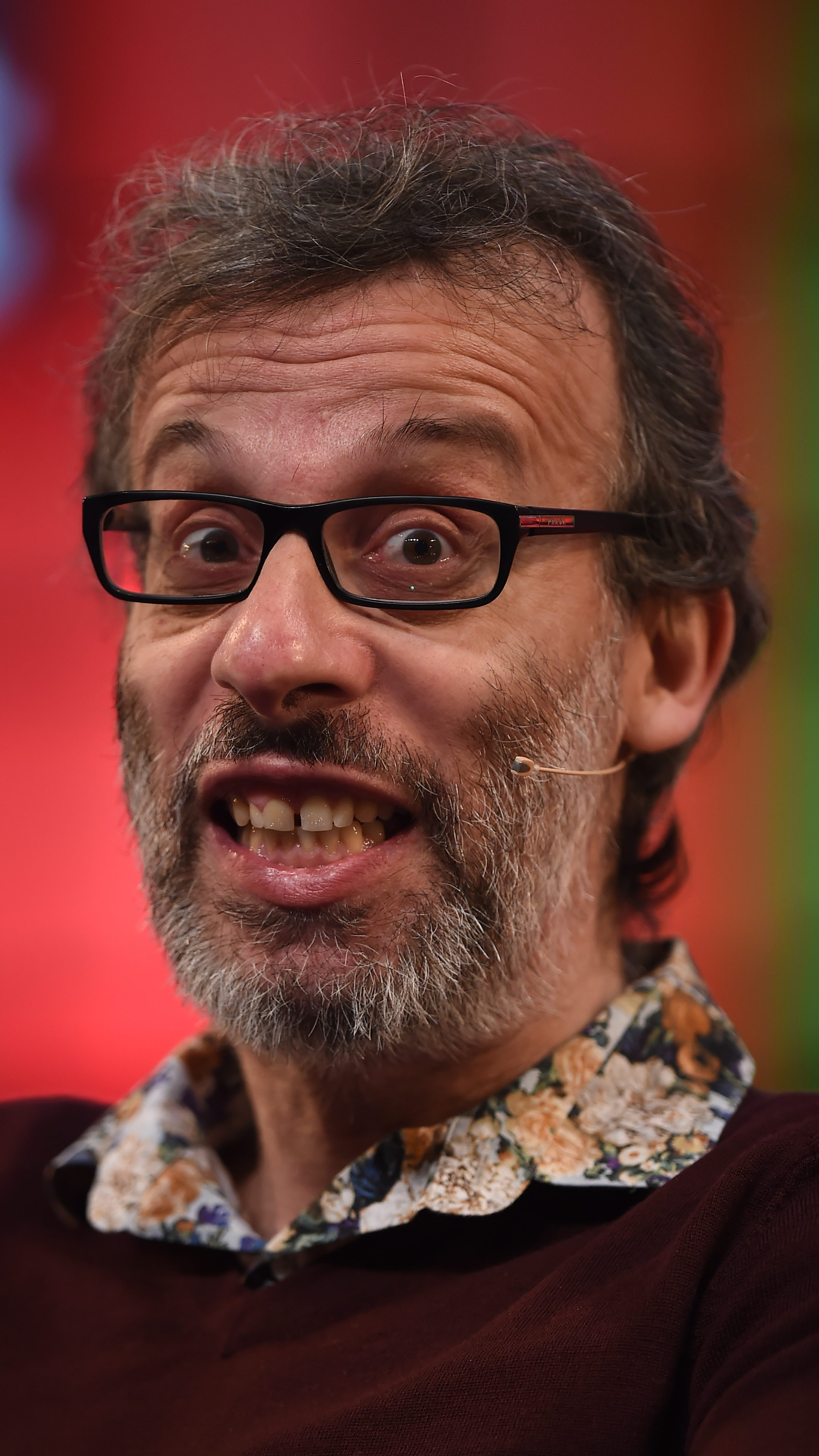
- Schneider at Web Summit, November 2015
- Born: 22 May 1963 (age 63); London, England
- Education: City of London School
- Alma mater: Exeter College, Oxford
- Occupations: Comedian, actor, director
- Years active: 1980s – present
- Height: 5 ft 6 in (1.68 m)

David Schneider (born 22 May 1963) is a British comedian, actor, and director. His acting roles include the role of Tony Hayers, in the Alan Partridge franchise.

== Early life ==
David Schneider was born in London, England on 22 May 1963 to a Jewish family. He was educated at the City of London School, an independent school for boys in the City of London, before going to Exeter College, Oxford, where he studied modern languages, and studied for a doctorate in Yiddish Drama. During his time at university, Schneider performed a predominantly physical comedy act that contrasted with the trend towards stand-up comedy in live performance in the 1980s. It was at this time that he met Armando Iannucci, who in 1991 recruited him for news-radio spoof On the Hour. He is a fan of Arsenal F.C.

== Career ==
He performed in the BBC Sketch show Up to Something (1990) with Shane Richie, Suzy Aitchison, Frances Dodge, & Lewis MacLeod (actor).

Schneider performed in The Day Today, the television spin-off from On the Hour and also appeared in the spin-offs Knowing Me, Knowing You... with Alan Partridge and I'm Alan Partridge where he played the fictional BBC commissioning editor, Tony Hayers. In 1994, he made an appearance on Mr. Bean, in Back to School Mr. Bean, as the judo teacher. In 1996, Schneider wrote The Eleventh Commandment, a play for the Hampstead Theatre about a Jew marrying a gentile. In the late 1990s he appeared in the topical satire The Saturday Night Armistice (subsequently retitled The Friday Night Armistice) alongside Armando Iannucci and Peter Baynham. In 1997 and 2000, Schneider played the part of Bradley Wilson in the BBC sitcom The Peter Principle.

Schneider wrote the screenplay for the 2001 feature film All the Queen's Men, directed by Stefan Ruzowitzky and starring Matt LeBlanc and Eddie Izzard. Schneider has also performed in the BBC sitcom Gimme Gimme Gimme and appeared on BBC Radio 4 panel show The 99p Challenge. He had small roles in several movies, including The Saint, 28 Days Later, A Knight's Tale and Mission: Impossible, where he played the driver of the Eurotunnel train. In 2004, Schneider played Joseph Goebbels in the satirical tongue-in-cheek comedy Churchill: The Hollywood Years. Following this, in 2006 Schneider took his first lead role when he made Uncle Max, a series of 13 dialogue-free shorts for CITV. They focus on slapstick humour, with Schneider saying he wanted to be "a human cartoon".

In April 2008, he featured in an episode of Hotel Babylon as a magician, a character not dissimilar to Tony le Mesmer whom he played in an episode of Knowing Me, Knowing You... with Alan Partridge. Schneider provides the voice of Blink for the CBBC series One Minute Wonders. In 2008, he took part in BBC Three's Most Annoying People of 2008, relaying his views about celebrities including Prince William, Mark Ronson and Peaches Geldof. In 2009, Schneider explored his Yiddish heritage with a 30-minute documentary for BBC Radio 4, My Yiddisher Mother Tongue, with contributors including family members, academics, Colin Powell and Michael Grade.

He has written a play, called Making Stalin Laugh, based on the slaughter of the Moscow State Jewish Theatre on the orders of Joseph Stalin. He also directed a sitcom pilot in 2007 called Up Close and Personal, set in the offices of a celebrity magazine and starring Raquel Cassidy. The pilot was subsequently rejected by ITV2. In 2011, he played Soggy Sid in Horrid Henry: The Movie, and in 2012, appeared in ITV drama Whitechapel, series 3, as murder suspect and taxi driver Marcus Salter. His radio sitcom Births, Deaths and Marriages, set in a register office and starring himself, premiered on BBC Radio 4 in May 2012.

In 2014 he co-founded That Lot, a social media agency alongside writer David Levin and David Beresford. In 2018 they sold the company to the PR firm Weber Shandwick.

Schneider appeared in the fifth episode of the second season in the TV show Plebs in 2014, portraying a slave auctioneer called Agorix. In 2017, Schneider wrote the screenplay of The Death of Stalin with Armando Iannucci.

== Filmography ==
=== Film ===
Film
| Year | Title | Role | Notes |
|---|---|---|---|
| 1993 | The Trial | Kullich | |
| 1996 | Mission: Impossible | Train Driver | |
| 1997 | The Saint | Bar Waiter | |
| 1998 | Comic Act | | |
| 1999 | You're Dead | Ian | |
| 2000 | If Looks Could Kill: The Power of Behaviour | Mr. Tanner | Video short |
| 2001 | A Knight's Tale | Relic Seller | |
| 2002 | 28 Days Later | Scientist | |
| 2003 | Blackball | Young Buck Reporter | |
| 2003 | Cheeky | Todd | |
| 2004 | Fat Slags | Tanner | |
| 2004 | Churchill: The Hollywood Years | Goebels | |
| 2006 | The Battersea Ripper | | |
| 2006 | Scoop | Joe's Co-Passengers | |
| 2009 | Crazy Hands | Spencer | Short film |
| 2010 | The Infidel | Monty | |
| 2011 | Horrid Henry: The Movie | Soggy Sid | |
| 2011 | Arthur Christmas | General | Voice |
| 2012 | The Pirates! In an Adventure with Scientists! | Scarlett Morgan | Voice; Also known as The Pirates! Band of Misfits |
| 2013 | This Is Intercourse | Henry's Dad | Short film |
| 2013 | Underdogs | Chester | Original title: Metegol; Voice, English version |
| 2017 | The Death of Stalin | —N/a | Writer |
| 2022 | Fork | Demon | |

=== Television ===
Television
| 1990 | Up to Something! | Various | Writer |
| 1991 | Heading Home | Stamford Hill Cowboy | Series 7, episode 1: Screen Two |
| 1992 | Fireworks Safety | Ed Banger | TV short |
| 1994 | Mr. Bean | Judo Instructor | Episode 11: "Back to School Mr. Bean" |
| 1994 | Paris | Butler | Episode 5: "La solitude" |
| 1994 | The Day Today | Sylvester Stewart / Alex - The Bureau / Brant / Adam Neils / Anthony Parr - Managing Director / Anton Sampson / Various | 7 episodes Credited as Dave Schneider - 1 episode Writer - 7 episodes |
| 1994–1995 | Knowing Me Knowing You with Alan Partridge | Tony Hayers / Adrian Finch / Clown Leader / Clive Sealey / Tony Le Mesmer | 7 episodes Writer - 2 episodes |
| 1995 | The Glam Metal Detectives | Constable / The Beefeater / Lucifer / Old Peg Legs | 4 episodes |
| 1995 | Lloyds Bank Channel 4 Film Challenge | Martin | Series 2, episode 6: "Life's a Bitch" |
| 1995 | The Friday Night Armistice | —N/a | Writer |
| 1995–2000 | The Peter Principle | Bradley Wilson | Also known as The Boss; Main role; 13 episodes |
| 1996 | Kavanagh QC | Martin Haslam | Series 2, episode 5: "A Stranger in the Family" |
| 1997 | I'm Alan Partridge | Tony Hayers | 4 episodes |
| 1998 | The Tribe | Man in Waiting Room | TV film |
| 2000 | Gimme Gimme Gimme | Neville | Series 2, episode 5: "Glad to be Gay?" |
| 2000 | The Canterbury Tales | | Voice; Series 2, episode 1: "The Journey Back" |
| 2001 | The Armando Iannucci Shows | Tooth Fairy | Episode 7: "Morality" - Uncredited; Writer and program consultant - Episode 1: "Twats"; Director - Episode 3: "Communication"; Producer |
| 2002 | Look Around You | Man Outside Toilet | Uncredited; Series 1, episode 4: "Germs" |
| 2004 | Shane | Bazza | |
| 2004 | Animate Tales of the World | | Voice; Series 3, episode 1: "The Shoemaker's Son" |
| 2005 | Nathan Barley | Man in porn film | Episode #1.3 |
| 2006 | The Ten Commandments | Tobia | Miniseries |
| 2006–2008 | Uncle Max | Uncle Max | 26 episodes |
| 2008 | Clive Hole | Clive Hole | TV movie |
| 2009 | One Minute Wonders | Blink | Voice; Main role; 13 episodes |
| 2010 | Little Howard's Big Question | Alan Monster | Series 2, episode 2: "How Can I Make a Monster?" |
| 2010 | How Not to Live Your Life | Derek | Series 3, episode 2: "Don's Angry Girlfriend" |
| 2011 | My Family | Solicitor | Series 11, episode 6: "A Decent Proposal" |
| 2011 | Doctor Who: The Monthly Adventures | Ernst Bratfisch | Voice; Episode: "The Silver Turk" |
| 2012 | Whitechapel | Marcus Salter | 2 episodes |
| 2013 | Fit | —N/a | Writer - Episode #1.2 |
| 2016–2017 | Josh | —N/a | Writer - 12 episodes Director - 18 episodes |
| 2014 | BBC Comedy Feeds | —N/a | Director - Series 3, episode 1: "Josh" |
| 2014 | Plebs | Agorix | Series 2, episode 5: "The New Slave" |
| 2020 | Avenue 5 | —N/a | Director - Series 1, episode 8: "This Is Physically Hurting Me" |
