= Love Birds (Sherman) =

- Edinburgh poster
- Music: Robert J. Sherman
- Lyrics: Robert J. Sherman
- Book: Robert J. Sherman
- Productions: 2015 Edinburgh Festival Fringe

Love Birds is an original musical with book, music and lyrics by Robert J. Sherman. The musical officially premiered at the 2015 Edinburgh Fringe Festival at The Pleasance on 7 August 2015. The production was directed and choreographed by Stewart Nicholls. Prior to the Edinburgh run, there were two previews held in London at the Lost Theatre (in Stockwell) on 28 and 29 July. The Original Edinburgh Cast Recording was recorded on 30 July and mixed and mastered on 31 July and 3 August and was first released by SimG Records on 12 August at the Edinburgh Festival. Two Edinburgh previews took place on 5 and 6 August, with Press Night taking place on 8 August. The final festival performance took place on 31 August. The show starred Ruth Betteridge, Greg Castiglioni, John Guerrasio, George Knapper, Jonny Purchase, Joanna Sawyer, Anna Stolli, Rafe Watts and Ryan Willis. In its end-of-the-year round-up of regional British fringe musical theatre, Musical Theatre Review hailed Love Birds:

a triumph of whimsy, a children’s story written with adult sensibilities and featuring a cracking score that celebrated the lost era of vaudeville. Blessed with an equally strong design from Gabriella Slade and some marvellously sensitive performances, Love Birds was probably the most accomplished piece of musical theatre to arise from the many delights at this year’s festival.

== History of the musical ==
After two short but successful runs of A Spoonful of Sherman, during the recording of the original cast album in December 2014, Sherman turned to Nicholls with the Love Birds concept. Only a few of the songs were complete and a script had yet to be written but Nicholls liked the concept and the songs he had heard. Nicholls suggested veteran Edinburgh producer, Kat Portman Smith to produce. The script and balance of songs were then composed over the next few months with a first draft (one act) book and score completed in June 2015. In the meantime, a poster image was commissioned which would set much of the visual tone of the piece moving forward. The poster was created by Rebecca Pitt. A production team was put together consisting of designer Gabriella Slade, lighting designer Rob Mills, sound designer Andy Hinton, casting director Stephen Moore, stage manager Roisin Symes, production manager Simon Streeting. Press representative Susie Safavi and social media manager Terri Paddock were also brought in at this point. Originally Music Supervision was being handled by Colin Billing, who had worked with Nicholls and Sherman on A Spoonful of Sherman the year before. In late June, Billing had to pull out from the production for personal reasons, at which point musical director Richard Healey stepped in to do the music arrangements for the show in just under two weeks. Taking Healey's place as musical director was Neil MacDonald. Rehearsals commenced in earnest on 13 July 2015, at The Big Wheel rehearsal space in Exmouth Market, London. London previews were held on 28 and 29 July at the Lost Theatre in Stockwell. On 30 July the entire original cast album was recorded (in a single day) at Porcupine Studios and mixed over the following two days by engineer Nick Taylor. Edinburgh previews began on 5 August, with press attending from 6 August onward.

=== Other performances ===
On 13 July 2018 Love Birds was performed as part of a masters' thesis project at the Guildford School of Acting.

== Characters and original Edinburgh cast ==
Character	Description	Original Edinburgh performer
Armitage Shanks	The sixty-five million year old plesiosaur impresario of Love Birds. He lives a parallel, doppelgänger existence as the Loch Ness Monster, an identity he must come to grips with.	John Guerrasio
Baalthazar Macaw	The self-centered, colorful Italian opera singing macaw (billed as “The Feathered Caruso”). He has recently acquired an unhealthy obsession with "Crunchy Crackers".	Greg Castiglioni
Vera	The oldest and most pragmatic of three female singing macaw performers in the Love Birds musical revue. She is secretly in love with Armitage.	Anna Stolli
Veronica	The voluptuous vamp of the three female singing macaws.	Joanna Sawyer
Valentine	Baalthazar's daughter and the youngest of the Macaw trio; the ingénue.	Ruth Betteridge
Parker	The leader of the four penguin singing group.	Rafe Watts
Presley	The most suave (and potentially rebellious) member of the four penguin singing group.	Jonny Purchase
Pewcey	The persnickety member of the penguin singing group.	Ryan Willis
Puck	The youngest member of the penguin singing group. The "Donnie Osmond" of the quartet, he often fronts the act.	George Knapper
Heckler MacKracken	A heckler in the Love Birds audience who stalks Armitage and who is obsessed with outing him as the Loch Ness Monster. (Voice Over)	Neil MacDonald
Chief Justice	The judge who pronounces sentence on Armitage. (loosely based on the real life Chief Justice Taft of the U.S. Supreme Court. (Voice Over)	Adam Niemann
Hawker #1	A 1920s period newspaper hawker, (incidental character). (Voice Over)	
Hawker #2	A 1920s period newspaper hawker, (incidental character). (Voice Over)	

== Plot ==
The year is 1923, the Age of Vaudeville. It is a magical, musical time when birds and monsters can put on a show that will fill a theatre. Outside of house, plesiosaur impresario Armitage Shanks (a.k.a. the “Loch Ness Monster”) hawks his all-avian revue “Love Birds” to passersby on the street. (Fanfare / Barrelhouse Barker). Inside the theatre, famed Italian crooning parrot, Baalthazar Macaw (a.k.a. “The Feathered Caruso”) sings his World War I era hit (Glorious Gull Of The Glen). But just as he trills the final electrifying notes of his song, a mysterious person in the audience audibly bites into a “Crunchy Cracker”. After the show, an outraged Baalthazar storms off, swearing never to return to the Love Birds stage. Armitage chases after his old friend (and star attraction of the show).

Just then, a well-meaning quartet of penguins inadvertently blocks the plesiosaur's passage. Dismayed at losing sight of Baalthazar, Armitage's mood brightens when he discovers that the fresh-faced foursome can sing. After hearing only a short excerpt of their song (Mary Poppins), Armitage hires the quartet on the spot. Suddenly gussied-up in barbershop regalia, Parker, Presley, Pewcey and Puck take the stage as performers in the show. Overnight the four penguins become a regular fixture in the “Love Birds” revue, singing and dancing alongside Baalthazar's backup singers, the three musical veteran macaws, Vera, Veronica and Valentine (Tinpanorama).

Albeit performances run to half empty houses, Armitage is gratified that he can still, at least keep the show running. He tries to reassure Valentine (who is Baalthazar's daughter) that although her father will, from time to time, pull melodramatic stunts, eventually he always “flies right.” Still, until his return, the plesiosaur suggests the company will have to “improvise a little”. He encourages the Love Birds cast to continue to find new (family-friendly) material to perform. In this spirit, the penguins and parrots cobble together an operetta entitled, “The Unlikely Saga of Sadie Macaw”. Its debut marks the first time precocious Puck plays opposite parrot ingénue Valentine (Sadie Macaw [pt. 1] / Bird With The Broken Heart / Valentine / Sadie Macaw [pt. 2]).

The next day, Puck finds Valentine backstage, rummaging through Armitage's old trunk of songs, looking for something to sing. Clearly smitten with the parrot, Puck awkwardly presents her with “a rose of congratulation” in recognition of their first performance together. Valentine enjoys the attention of her would-be suitor even though she doesn't take Puck particularly seriously. Still Puck making her laugh serves as a much needed reprieve from her ongoing worry concerning her missing father. Together the penguin and the parrot sift through a flurry of quirky songs, each one possessing a more peculiar title than the last. When they finally happen on a song called “Today Is Yesterday’s Tomorrow” Valentine explains that “Armitage gave up songwriting after that!” Just then, Armitage appears. He elaborates that he gave up songwriting because the publishers said he was a dinosaur (Old Fashioned Guy). The song morphs into an “on-stage” soft-shoe number. Halfway through, Baalthazar unexpectedly swoops back onto stage. Two old cronies, Baalthazar and Armitage, finish out the number together, revealing the deep-seated friendship they share for each other, despite their differences and ongoing squabbles.

When the song concludes, the mood shifts. Baalthazar tries to persuade Armitage into modernizing the show by introducing elements of burlesque. Armitage is adamant that he will never let the show “go blue” even if it means not making much money.

Frustrated, Baalthazar exits and Veronica finds Armitage alone. Wanting to thank him for giving her the job singing in the troupe, she makes seductive advances toward him. Taken aback, Armitage stops Veronica from going any further. He tells her that she doesn't ever have to thank him in that sort of manner. He confides in her that to him she is "an angel – with wings and a celestial voice" He entered show business so that he could be close to that, not so that he could destroy it. Veronica is moved to tears.

Meanwhile, Baalthazar has not given up trying to bring in more revenue vis-à-vis “going burlesque”. To this end, he works behind the scenes, convincing Presley and the other penguins to perform a more titillating, Charleston-esque song (The Flipper Flap). As the song concludes, Armitage storms the stage, apologizing to the audience for the penguins’ choice of “blue” material. Backstage, the plesiosaur chastises the penguins. Awash in feelings of guilt (and confusion) Presley repents, committing to make more traditional choices in his life moving forward (Old Fashioned Guy [Reprise]).

Dressed as a male mobster (parrot), Vera performs, (The Sharpest Smile) a cautionary tale about a doomed romance between a parrot and a crocodile named “Pearl” (who is played by Armitage). As the song progresses, “Pearl” chases the “mobster” up and down the stage in a loving attempt to eat the mobster alive.

In a private moment, Baalthazar discloses (only to the audience) his obsession with “Crunchy Crackers”. He explains that mankind has systematically used “the devil biscuit” to oppress his species. He vows never to allow the Crunchy Cracker to wield such power over him. Just then Veronica enters. Efforts thwarted once already, Baalthazar maneuvers Veronica into singing a burlesque interpretation of a song he knows Armitage wouldn't suspect could “go blue” – because it's a song that Armitage himself wrote (Paint A Rainbow). Baalthazar wagers that once they see it performed, the audience will get a taste for Veronica's risqué “feather dance” and it will become an inevitable fait accompli that the show must “go blue”. When Armitage finally sees what's happening on stage though, he's mortified. As the number finishes, the Machiavellian macaw victoriously takes the spotlight. As he had predicted, the audience responds with hoots and hollers. He then reveals to the audience that the feather dance was his idea after all. Armitage takes the stage, once again expressing his deep disappointment with the conniving parrot. Impetuously Baalthazar, yet again, storms out of the theatre. Valentine begs her father to stay, or at least to tell her where he's going, but Baalthazar refuses to tell her.

Later that night, while attempting to acquire some Crunchy Crackers from a shady street vendor, Baalthazar is arrested. Having hit rock bottom, the humbled parrot confesses his cracker addiction to one and all (Crunchy Crackers). Baalthazar becomes so frenzied that he must be carried off stage so that he can seek help for his affliction. Armitage delivers the sad news that “Without a star who can fill the theatre seats, that night’s show must be their very last.” Valentine meets with her father just before he's about to leave for the Cracker Asylum. She has a long overdue conversation with Baalthazar about their relationship (On Cloudy Days).

With all hope seemingly lost, Puck cheers Valentine up just as they're about to go on stage for the very last time. Suddenly Valentine sees the young penguin through different eyes (Love Birds). At the song's conclusion, penguin and parrot kiss, causing a scandal that hits all the newspapers. Armitage is forced to appear before the Supreme Court where he must now stand trial in front of the chief justice of the land. The case is ultimately dismissed due to there being no actual laws broken.

The show is reopened and due to the recent notoriety it had received, becomes more popular than ever. In light of Valentine and Puck's romance, Presley and Veronica announce that they too are in love. Armitage reluctantly gives the birds his blessing – and as he does, a sudden surge of euphoria washes over him, making him realize how good casting off outmoded convictions can feel. The plesiosaur's newfound spirit of acceptance is quickly put to the test when Parker and Pewcey reveal that they too, “have found love!” To everyone's surprise, Armitage rushes to congratulate the two penguins. Parker and Pewcey are deeply relieved to receive Armitage's approval. Then Armitage adds enigmatically, that he looks forward to meeting the penguins’ future WIVES too”. Finally back from the “Cracker Palace,” and cracker-free for two months, Baalthazar appears on stage. He consoles Parker and Pewcey reminding them that Armitage is a dinosaur after all, and that one shouldn't expect progressive thinking from a dinosaur. Then the reformed parrot adds that they shouldn't worry: “Armitage will come around. He always does.” As the show comes to a close, Armitage tells the penguins, parrots and the audience that we should embrace love where we can find it (Today Is Yesterday's Tomorrow). Then, taking his own advice, he kisses Vera. (Love Birds [Finale]).

== Musical numbers ==
- Prologue:
- Pt. I: "Fanfare"
- Pt. II: "Barrelhouse Barker" – Armitage Shanks
- Pt. III: "Love Birds" (pre-prise) – Armitage Shanks and Ensemble
- Pt. IV: "Glorious Gull of the Glen" (excerpt) – Baalthazar Macaw
- "Mary Poppins" – Parker, Presley, Pewcey and Puck
- "Tinpanorama" – Vera, Veronica, Valentine and Penguins
- "There's a Parrot On the End of Your Umbrella" (excerpt) – Parker, Presley, Pewcey and Puck
- The Operetta:
- Pt. I: "Sadie Macaw (Bookend)" – Parker, Presley, Pewcey and Puck
- Pt. II: "The Bird With the Broken Heart" a.k.a. "Nobody Knows" – Valentine, Parker, Presley, Pewcey and Puck
- Pt. III: "Valentine" – Puck with Parker, Presley and Pewcey
- Pt. IV: "Sadie Macaw (Bookend)" – Parker, Presley, Pewcey and Puck
- "Old Fashioned Guy" – Armitage Shanks and Baalthazar Macaw
- "Old Fashioned Guy (short reprise)" – Armitage Shanks
- "The Flipper Flap" – Parker, Presley, Pewcey and Puck
- "Old Fashioned Guy (extended reprise)" – Armitage Shanks
- "The Sharpest Smile" – Vera
- "Paint A Rainbow" – Veronica
- "Crunchy Crackers" – Baalthazar Macaw
- "Love Birds" – Puck, Valentine and Ensemble
- "Today Is Yesterday's Tomorrow" – Armitage Shanks and Ensemble
- "Love Birds (finale)" – Ensemble

=== Songs and musical numbers cut for Edinburgh ===
The following is a list of songs (or partially written songs) cut for the Edinburgh run but which may be considered for an expanded version of the show.

- "On Cloudy Days" – Valentine
- "Crunchy Crackers (short reprise)" - Baalthazar
- "It's Your Birthday" – Ensemble
- "Born To Butle" – Presley and the Penguins
- "Who Murdered Vaudeville?" – Armitage Shanks and Ensemble
- "Dress For Success" – Pewcey and Parker
- "Cock of the Walk" - Baalthazar and the Cock-A-Doodle-Doo-To-Ya Chorus
- "Dancing Shoes" - Puck and Ensemble
- "Twelve Kinds of Ugly" - Vera, Veronica and Valentine
- "Lady MacFussbudget (A Waltz)" - Puck and the Penguins
- "Blimey, I'm Slimy (Over You!)" - Parker
- "Chubby Cheeks" - Vera, Veronica and Valentine
- "No Valentine" - Armitage Shanks

=== Unused promotional jingle ===
This is a specially written promotional jingle by Robert Sherman and sung by the characters who play penguins in the show. It is 30 seconds long in duration and meant to introduce the penguin characters individually to the crowd. The lyric also mentions showtimes, venue name and location.

- "Parker, Presley, Pewcey and Puck" – Parker, Presley, Pewcey and Puck

== The band ==
Due to the constrictions of Edinburgh Festival Fringe the band was limited to three players. Neil MacDonald played piano and was the musical director, Marcus Pritchard played double bass and James Pritchard played drums and percussion. The Pritchards are brothers. The same trio played on all the live shows leading up to and during the Edinburgh run. They also played on the Original Cast Recording.

== Original (Edinburgh) cast recording ==
Love Birds CD Cover

The Love Birds Original Edinburgh Cast Recording was recorded on 30 July 2015, and mixed on 31 July and 3 August. The CD was produced by Robert Sherman. The music was produced by Richard Healey, Neil MacDonald and Nick Taylor and recorded, mixed and mastered by Nick Taylor at Porcupine Studios in South London. The CD was released by SimG Records on 17 August 2015, with pre-orders and advance copies available from 13 August. The recording was released digitally on iTunes on 14 September 2015.

=== Track listing ===
All music is composed by Robert J. Sherman.

Love Birds (Original Edinburgh Cast Recording)
No.	Title	Lead vocals	Length
1.	"Prologue ("Fanfare"/"Barrelhouse Barker"/"Glorious Gull of the Glen")"	John Guerrasio, Greg Castiglioni, Company	2:37
2.	"Mary Poppins"	George Knapper, Ryan Willis, Jonny Purchase, Rafe Watts	2:14
3.	"Tinpanorama"	Anna Stolli, Joanna Sawyer and Ruth Betteridge (with Jonny Purchase, Ryan Willis, Rafe Watts and George Knapper)	2:40
4.	"Sadie McCaw (Part 1)"	Ryan Willis, Jonny Purchase, Rafe Watts and George Knapper	1:09
5.	"The Bird With The Broken Heart (Nobody Knows)"	Ruth Betteridge (with Ryan Willis, Jonny Purchase, Rafe Watts and George Knapper)	2:36
6.	"Valentine"	George Knapper (with Ryan Willis, Jonny Purchase and Rafe Watts)	3:35
7.	"Sadie McCaw (Part 2)"	Rafe Watts, Ryan Willis, Jonny Purchase and George Knapper	0:46
8.	"Old Fashioned Guy"	John Guerrasio and Greg Castiglioni	2:58
9.	"The Flipper Flap"	Jonny Purchase (with George Knapper, Ryan Willis and Rafe Watts)	1:43
10.	"Old Fashioned Guy (Reprise)"	John Guerrasio (with Jonny Purchase)	2:03
11.	"The Sharpest Smile"	Anna Stolli	3:05
12.	"Paint A Rainbow"	Joanna Sawyer (with Rafe Watts and Ryan Willis)	3:11
13.	"Crunchy Crackers"	Greg Castiglioni	2:47
14.	"On Cloudy Days (Bonus Track)"	Ruth Betteridge	1:19
15.	"Love Birds"	George Knapper and Ruth Betteridge (Rafe Watts, Jonny Purchase, Ryan Willis, Anna Stolli and Joanna Sawyer)	2:47
16.	"Today Is Yesterday's Tomorrow"	John Guerrasio and Company	2:34
17.	"Love Birds (Finale)"	Company	2:47
Total length:			38:30

Track list information according taken from the CD liner notes.

=== Differences between the show and the CD running order ===
Slight modifications were made to the running order of the CD. "On Cloudy Days" was re-introduced into the running order after having been cut during rehearsals for Edinburgh. (It had been cut so the show would comply with the Edinburgh Festival Fringe's one-hour compliance rule.) The "Crunchy Crackers" brief reprise was also cut from the show for that reason, but was not included in the recording. "Old Fashioned Guy" (brief reprise) which is sung by Armitage to Veronica, was also left out of the recording. A number of songs which did not have endings in the context of the show, including "The Flipper Flap" and "Love Birds" were given "button" endings for the purposes of the cast recording.

== Critical response ==
The critical response meeting both Love Birds during its Edinburgh run and its simultaneous "Original Edinburgh Cast Recording" release was positive. In The Stage's wrap-up edition of the festival, on 3 September 2015, reporter Paul Vale declared Love Birds his "Critic's Pick" of the Fringe. Vale also gave the show five stars. Dominic Cavendish from The Telegraph gave Love Birds four stars.
