= Blues and Bullets =

2015 video game

- Developer: A Crowd of Monsters
- Publisher: A Crowd of Monsters
- Producers: Marta Serrano; Ruben Marquez
- Designer: Daniel Castellanos
- Programmers: Rafael Gonzalez; Xavier Jorba Cano
- Artist: Daniel Candil
- Composers: Damian Sanchez, Laizä
- Engine: Unity
- Platforms: Windows; Xbox One; OS X; Linux; PlayStation 4
- Release: Episode 1: Windows; WW: July 23, 2015 Xbox One; WW: August 28, 2015 PlayStation 4; WW: April 20, 2016; Episode 2: Windows; WW: March 8, 2016 Xbox One; WW: April 8, 2016 PlayStation 4; WW: April 20, 2016
- Genre: Action-adventure
- Mode: Single-player

Blues and Bullets is an episodic alt-history noir video game developed and published by A Crowd of Monsters on Microsoft Windows, OS X, Linux, Xbox One and PlayStation 4. The first two episodes of the five-episode game were released in July 2015 and March 2016, and the remaining three episodes will likely never be released, as developer A Crowd of Monsters ceased operations in 2016.

== Gameplay ==
The player searches for clues to find leads in the investigation. Clues include mutilated body parts. Clues can be matched to witnesses. There are also shooting sections. The game's narrative is told in monochrome with occasional tints of color. Interacting with other characters also plays a large part in the game.

== Plot ==
Eliot Ness (voiced by Doug Cockle) is the agent who jailed gangster Al Capone (voiced by John Guerrasio). In this new episodic game, Eliot Ness is a retired cop who runs a diner called Blues and Bullets. One day, someone tells him that Al Capone needs his help to find his kidnapped granddaughter. His former nemesis is the only man he trusts to get her back. There are other characters in the game, which include: Milton (voiced by Tom Clarke Hill), Delphine Dockers (voiced by Jules De Jong), Osmond Burke (voiced by Joseph May), Alice (voiced by Laila Pyne), Little Girl (voiced by Laila Pyne), Little Boy (voiced by Jules De Jong (episode 1) and Alexa Kahn (episode 2)), Dickinson (voiced by Kerry Shale), Jim Dockers (voiced by Colin Stinton) and Nikolai Ivankov (voiced by Bill Roberts).

== Development ==
The game was first announced on August 13, 2014. Several more screenshots were released on November 22, 2014, and the game was featured at the 2015 Game Developer's Conference. The game received an award at the Game Connection Development Awards for Excellence in Story & StoryTelling. A trailer was released on March 4, 2015. The first developer diary video of the game was published on May 16, 2015.

== Episodes ==
The game was expected to be separated into five episodes, released in several month intervals. "Episode 1" was released on July 23, 2015 and "Episode 2" was released on March 8, 2016. However, developer A Crowd of Monsters ceased operations in late 2016. No further episodes have been released.

No.	Title	Directed by	Written by	Original release date
1	"The End of Peace"	Daniel Candil and Daniel Castellanos	Josue Monchan; Story by Daniel Candil, Daniel Castellanos and Josue Monchan	July 23, 2015
Eliot Ness is a retired cop running a diner called Blues and Bullets. When his old nemesis, Al Capone asks for his help in finding his granddaughter who has been kidnapped.
2	"Shaking the Hive"	Daniel Candil and Daniel Castellanos	Josue Monchan; Story by Daniel Candil, Daniel Castellanos and Josue Monchan	March 8, 2016
Eliot Ness embarks on a journey into the mysterious submarine that emerged out of the water. While wearing a disguise made up of bandages, attempts to make a deal with Ivankov, the ruthless Russian mobster.
3	"Mourning the Dead"	Daniel Candil and Daniel Castellanos	Josue Monchan; Story by Daniel Candil, Daniel Castellanos and Josue Monchan	TBA
4	"Behind the Mask"	Daniel Candil and Daniel Castellanos	Josue Monchan; Story by Daniel Candil, Daniel Castellanos and Josue Monchan	TBA
5	"The New Untouchables"	Daniel Candil and Daniel Castellanos	Josue Monchan; Story by Daniel Candil, Daniel Castellanos and Josue Monchan	TBA

== Reception ==
=== "Episode 1: The End of Peace" ===
GameSpot awarded the first episode a score of 7.0 out of 10, saying "Although Blues and Bullets isn't without its flaws, this first episode sets a distinctive comic-book, crime-noir attitude compelling enough to keep you playing and looking forward to what the series will offer in future installments." ComboCaster awarded the first episode 8.3 out of 10, praising the story and pacing. The Sixth Axis awarded the first episode a score of seven out of ten, saying "The End Of Peace feels like A Crowd Of Monsters has crammed too much within the two and a half hour introductory episode, with lots of characters and events occurring without much time to digest what came before."
