= Armando Iannucci =

Scottish comedian, film director and producer (born 1963)

Armando Iannucci CBE
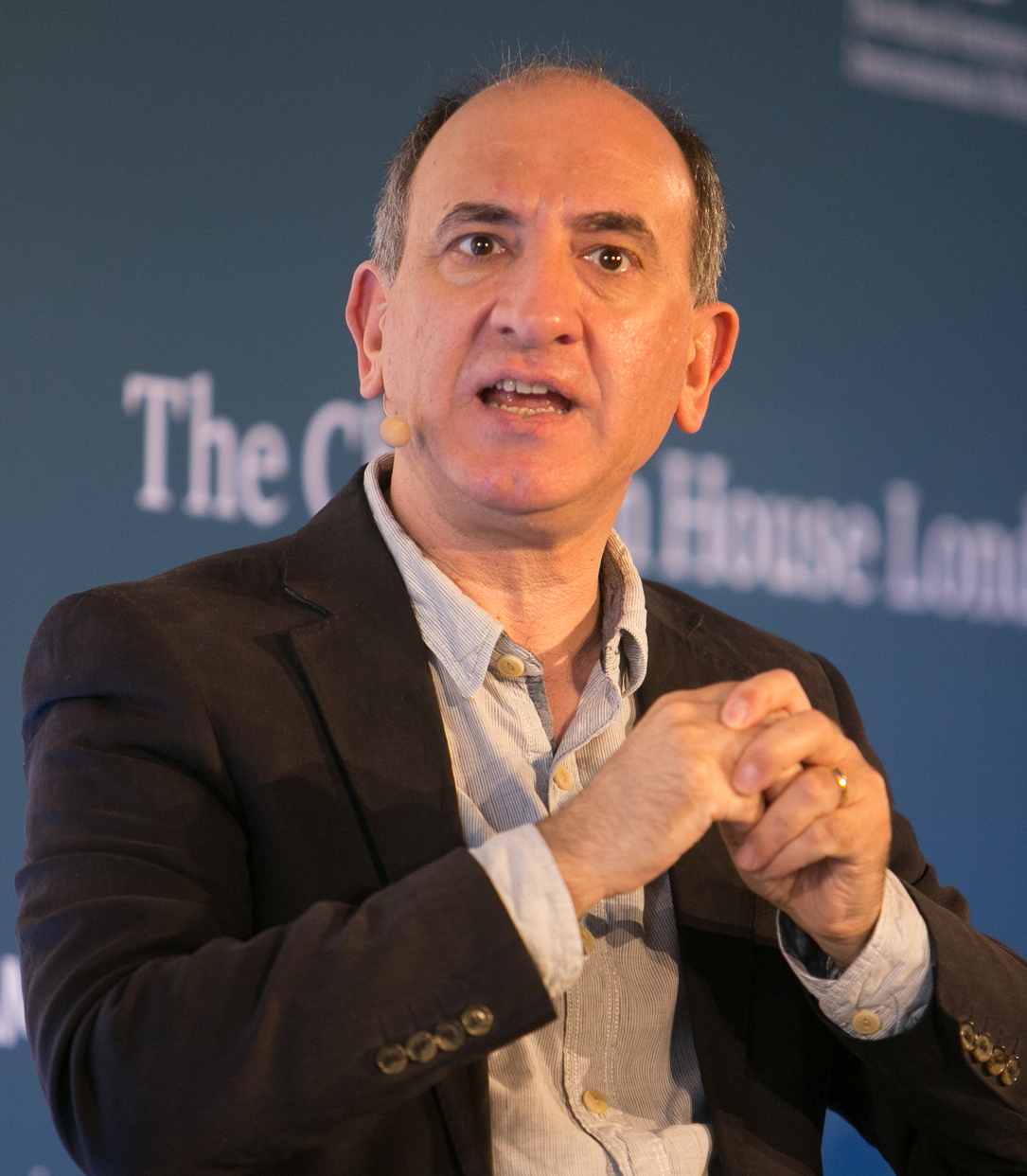
- Iannucci in 2017
- Born: Armando Giovanni Iannucci; 28 November 1963 (age 62); Glasgow, Scotland
- Education: University of Glasgow; University College, Oxford
- Spouse: Rachel Jones (m. 1990)
- Children: 3

Comedy career
- Years active: 1990–present
- Medium: Television, film, radio, stand-up
- Genres: Sitcom, political satire

Armando Giovanni Iannucci CBE (/jəˈnuːtʃi/ yə-NOO-chee; born 28 November 1963) is a Scottish satirist, writer, director, producer, and performer.

Born in Glasgow to Italian parents, Iannucci studied at the University of Glasgow followed by the University of Oxford. Starting on BBC Scotland and BBC Radio 4, his early work with Chris Morris on the radio series On the Hour transferred to television as The Day Today. A character from this series, Alan Partridge, co-created by Iannucci, went on to feature in a number of Iannucci's television and radio programmes, including Knowing Me Knowing You with Alan Partridge and I'm Alan Partridge. Iannucci also fronted the satirical Armistice review shows and in 2001 created his most personal work, The Armando Iannucci Shows, for Channel 4.

Moving back to the BBC in 2005, Iannucci created the political sitcom The Thick of It and the spoof documentary Time Trumpet in 2006. Winning funding from the UK Film Council, in 2009 he directed a critically acclaimed feature film, In the Loop, featuring characters from The Thick of It. As a result of these works, he has been described by The Daily Telegraph as "the hardman of political satire". Other works during this period include an operetta libretto, Skin Deep, and his radio series Charm Offensive. Iannucci created the HBO political satire Veep, and was its showrunner for four seasons from 2012 to 2015. For his work on Veep he won two Emmys in 2015, Outstanding Comedy Series and Outstanding Writing for a Comedy Series. He followed this with the feature films The Death of Stalin in 2017 and The Personal History of David Copperfield, a 2019 adaptation of the novel David Copperfield. In 2020, he created the comedy series Avenue 5 on HBO.

== Early life and education ==
Iannucci was born in Glasgow. His father, also called Armando, was from Naples, while his mother was born in Glasgow to an Italian family. Before emigrating, Iannucci's father wrote for an anti-fascist newspaper as a teenager and joined the Italian partisans at 17. He moved to Scotland in 1950 and ran a pizza factory in Springburn in Glasgow.

Iannucci has two brothers and a sister. His childhood home was near that of actor Peter Capaldi, who went on to play Malcolm Tucker in The Thick of It, a TV show created by Iannucci. Although their parents knew each other well, he and Capaldi did not know each other in childhood. In his teens, Iannucci thought seriously about becoming a Roman Catholic priest.

Iannucci was educated at St Peter's Primary School, St. Aloysius' College, Glasgow, the University of Glasgow and University College, Oxford, where he studied English literature. He was writing a DPhil thesis about 17th-century religious language, with particular reference to Milton's Paradise Lost, which he abandoned to follow a comedy career. He was particularly inspired by the American comedian and filmmaker Woody Allen, later calling him his "all-time comedy hero".

== Career ==
=== 1990s ===
After making several programmes at BBC Scotland in the early 1990s such as the No' The Archie McPherson Show, he moved to BBC Radio in London, making radio shows including Armando Iannucci for BBC Radio 1, which featured comedians he was to collaborate with for many years, including David Schneider, Peter Baynham, Steve Coogan and Rebecca Front.

Iannucci first received widespread fame as the producer for On the Hour on Radio 4, which transferred to television as The Day Today. He received critical acclaim for both his own talents as a writer and a producer, and for first bringing together such comics as Chris Morris, Richard Herring, Stewart Lee, Baynham and Coogan. The members of this group went on to work on separate projects and create a new comedy "wave" pre-New Labour: Morris went on to create Brass Eye, Blue Jam and the Chris Morris Music Show; Stewart Lee and Richard Herring created Fist of Fun and This Morning with Richard Not Judy.

Baynham was closely involved with both Morris's and Lee & Herring's work. Lee would go on to co-write Jerry Springer: The Opera, and wrote early material for Coogan's character Alan Partridge, who first appeared in On the Hour, and has featured in multiple spin-off series. Between 1995 and 1999, Iannucci produced and hosted The Saturday Night Armistice.

Iannucci's non-television works include Smokehammer, a web-based project with Chris Morris, and the 1997 book Facts and Fancies, composed of his newspaper columns, which was turned into a BBC Radio 4 series. The radio series Scraps With Iannucci, which followed late in 1998, featured Iannucci using his tape-fiddling skills to present a review of the year.

=== 2000s ===
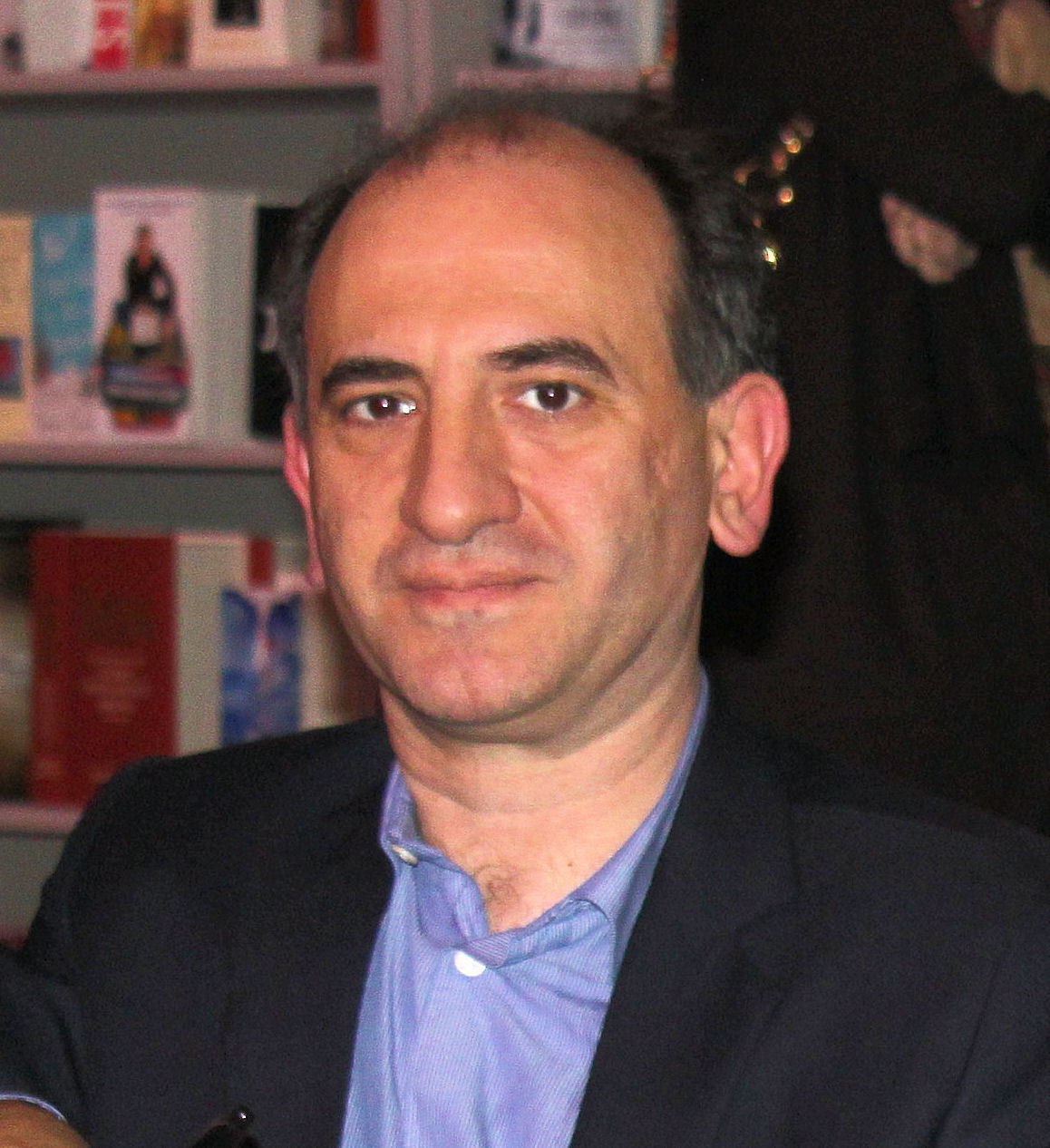
Iannucci in 2010

In 2000, he created two pilot episodes for Channel 4, which became The Armando Iannucci Shows. This was an eight-part series for Channel 4 broadcast in 2001, written with Andy Riley and Kevin Cecil. The series consisted of Iannucci pondering pseudo-philosophical and jocular ideas and fantasies in between surreal sketches. Iannucci has been quoted as saying it is the comedy series he is most proud of making. He told Metro in April 2007: "The Armando Iannucci Show [sic] on Channel 4 came out around 9/11, so it was overlooked for good reasons. People had other things on their minds. But that was the closest to me expressing my comic outlook on life."

After championing Yes Minister on the BBC's Britain's Best Sitcom, Iannucci devised, directed and was chief writer of The Thick of It, a political satire-cum-farce for BBC Four. It starred Chris Langham as an incompetent cabinet minister being manipulated by a cynical, foul-mouthed Press Officer, Malcolm Tucker. It was first broadcast for two short series on BBC Four in 2005, initially with a small cast focusing on a government minister, his advisers and their party's spin-doctor. The cast was significantly expanded for two-hour-long specials to coincide with Christmas and Gordon Brown's appointment as Prime Minister in 2007, which saw new characters forming the opposition party added to the cast. These characters continued when the show switched channels to BBC Two for its third series in 2009. A fourth series about a coalition government was broadcast in 2012. In a 2012 interview, Iannucci said the fourth series of the programme would probably be its last.

Based on a format he had used in Clinton: His Struggle with Dirt in 1996 and 2004: The Stupid Version in 2004, in mid-2006, his spoof documentary series Time Trumpet was shown on BBC 2. The series looked back on past events through highly edited clips and "celebrity" interviews, looking back on the present and near-future from the year 2031. One episode, featuring fictional terrorist attacks on London and the assassination of Tony Blair, was postponed and edited in August 2006 amid the terrorism scares in British airports at that time. Jane Thynne, writing in The Independent, accused the BBC of lacking backbone.

In 2007, he directed a series of Post Office television adverts, featuring the actors John Henshaw, Rory Jennings and Di Botcher alongside guest stars Joan Collins, Bill Oddie and Westlife.

Iannucci has appeared on Radio 3 talking about classical music, one of his passions, and collaborated with composer David Sawer on Skin Deep, an operetta, which was premiered by Opera North on 16 January 2009. He has also presented three programmes for BBC Radio 3, including Mobiles Off!, a 20-minute segment on classical concert-going etiquette. He was a regular columnist for the classical music magazine Gramophone.

In January 2009, his first feature film In the Loop, in the style of The Thick of It, was premiered at the Sundance Film Festival. It was the first cinema film to be directed by Iannucci, after his contribution to Tube Tales in 1999. The film was applauded by critics, both in Britain and the US, and was nominated for the Best Adapted Screenplay Oscar in 2009. The film secured the eighth highest placing in the UK box office in its opening week – despite its relatively insignificant screening numbers.

=== 2010s ===
He created the American HBO political satire television series Veep, starring Julia Louis-Dreyfus, set in the office of Selina Meyer, a fictional Vice-President of the United States. Veep uses a similar cinéma-vérité filming style to The Thick of It. Debuting in 2012, the show has aired seven seasons, winning multiple awards including seventeen Primetime Emmy Awards. However, beginning with season five, Iannucci stepped down as showrunner due to "personal reasons". In 2012 it was reported that he was writing his first novel, Tongue International, a satirical fantasy about the promotion of a "for-profit language". A book of his writings about classical music Hear Me Out was published in 2017. Iannucci's second feature film was The Death of Stalin, about the power struggle which followed the death of Joseph Stalin in 1953. It was released in October 2017 in the United Kingdom. The film was banned in Russia, Kazakhstan and Kyrgyzstan for allegedly mocking the countries' pasts and making fun of their leaders. However, it received a Magritte Award nomination in the category of Best Foreign Film and was a critical success. His third feature film was an adaptation of Charles Dickens's David Copperfield entitled The Personal History of David Copperfield. It premiered at the Toronto International Film Festival in 2019 and was cinematically released in the United Kingdom on 24 January 2020, receiving critical acclaim.

=== 2020s ===
In 2019, he began work on a new science fiction sitcom for HBO called Avenue 5, which premiered in 2020. He subsequently became an executive producer of the series and directed the pilot.

In July 2023, Iannucci announced that he was working on a stage adaptation of Stanley Kubrick's classic Cold War satire Dr. Strangelove or: How I Learned to Stop Worrying and Love the Bomb. Sean Foley would direct, and Iannucci's longtime collaborator Steve Coogan would star in multiple roles.

In January 2026, Iannucci was announced as a contestant on the twenty-first series of Taskmaster.

In May 2026, Iannucci, along with Simon Blackwell, was announced as a writer on Paddington 4.

== Personal life ==
In 1990, he married Rachel Jones, whom he met when she designed the lighting for his one-man show at Oxford. They have two sons and one daughter and currently live in Hertfordshire.

He is a former patron of the Silver Star Society, a charity supporting women through difficult pregnancies. In April 2012, as part of his support for the Silver Star Society, he abseiled from the top of the John Radcliffe Hospital in Oxford to raise money for the hospital's specialist pregnancy unit.

=== Politics ===
In the 2010 general election Iannucci supported the Liberal Democrats, stating: "I'll be voting Lib Dem this election because they represent the best chance in a lifetime to make lasting and fair change to how the UK is governed." After the Conservative–Liberal Democrat Coalition of 2010 was established, however, he expressed doubts over his continued support for the party, saying he was 'wavering' on many issues and has admitted to 'queasiness' over the Coalition's economic measures. He also seemed to contemplate targeting the Liberal Democrats in the fourth series of The Thick of It, rather as the first three had targeted what he perceived as the failings within the Labour governments of Tony Blair and Gordon Brown.

In July 2018, Iannucci announced his support on Twitter for People's Vote, a campaign group calling for a public vote on the final Brexit deal between the UK and the European Union. He also expressed these views the following month in an editorial in the Daily Mirror, and they went on to be reported in other British newspapers.

=== Favourite films ===
In 2022, Iannucci participated in the Sight & Sound film polls of that year. It is held every ten years to select the greatest films of all time, by asking contemporary directors to select ten films of their choice.

Iannucci's selections were:

- 2001: A Space Odyssey (1968)
- The Godfather (1972)
- The Battle of Algiers (1966)
- The Great Dictator (1940)
- Nashville (1975)
- Annie Hall (1977)
- Alien (1979)
- Festen (1998)
- Ran (1985)
- Monty Python's Life of Brian (1979)

== Works ==
=== Film ===
Title	Year	Role(s)			Notes
Title	Year	Director	Writer	Producer	Notes
Tube Tales	1999	Yes	Yes	No	Segment: "Mouth"
In the Loop	2009	Yes	Yes	No	
Alan Partridge: Alpha Papa	2013	No	Yes	Executive	
The Death of Stalin	2017	Yes	Yes	No	
The Personal History of David Copperfield	2019	Yes	Yes	Yes	

=== Television ===
Title	Year	Functioned as					Notes
Title	Year	Director	Writer	Producer	Appeared	Role	Notes
Up Yer News	1990	No	Yes	No	Yes		
The Day Today	1994	No	Yes	Yes	Yes	Hellwyn Ballard	Also co-creator with Chris Morris
Knowing Me Knowing You with Alan Partridge	1994	No	Yes	Yes	No	—N/a	Also co-creator with Steve Coogan & Patrick Marber
The Saturday Night Armistice (Note: Later known as The Friday Night Armistice.)	1995–1999	No	Yes	No	Yes	Presenter	
I'm Alan Partridge	1997–2002	Yes	Yes	Yes	No	—N/a	Also co-creator with Steve Coogan & Peter Baynham
Clinton: His Struggle with Dirt	1998	Yes	Yes	Yes	Yes	Himself	Television special
The Armando Iannucci Shows	2001	Yes	Yes	Yes	Yes	Presenter	Eight episodes
Gash	2003	No	Yes	No	Yes	Presenter	Four episodes
Britain's Best Sitcom	2004	No	No	No	Yes	Presenter	Episode: "Yes Minister"
2004: The Stupid Version	2004	Yes	Yes	Yes	Yes	Presenter	Television special
Have I Got News for You	2004–2023	No	No	No	Yes	Panelist	Eight episodes
The Thick of It	2005–2012	Yes	Yes	Yes	No	—N/a	Also creator
Time Trumpet	2006	Yes	Yes	Yes	Yes	Himself	Also co-creator with Roger Drew & Will Smith
Comics Britannia	2007	No	No	No	Yes	Narrator	Three-part documentary series
Lab Rats	2008	No	No	Executive	No	—N/a	Six episodes
Milton's Heaven and Hell	2009	No	Yes	No	Yes	Presenter	Television special
Genius	2009	No	No	Executive	No	—N/a	Six episodes
Stewart Lee's Comedy Vehicle	2009–2011	No	No	Executive	Yes	Himself	
Mid Morning Matters with Alan Partridge	2010–2011	No	Yes	Executive	No	—N/a	Also co-creator with Steve Coogan & Neil and Rob Gibbons
Armando's Tale of Charles Dickens	2012	No	Yes	No	Yes	Presenter	Television special
Hunderby	2012	No	No	Executive	No	—N/a	
Veep	2012–2015	Yes	Yes	Executive	No	—N/a	Also creator
Avenue 5	2020–2022	Yes	Yes	Executive	No	—N/a	Also creator
The Franchise	2024	No	No	Executive	No	—N/a	
Taskmaster	2026	No	No	No	Yes	Contestant	Series 21, 10 episodes

=== Radio ===
- Down Your Ear (BBC Radio4 – creator, writer, producer)
- On the Hour (BBC Radio 4 – creator, co-writer, producer)
- No' The Archie McPherson Show (BBC Radio Scotland – presenter, comedy sketch writer)
- Bite The Wax (BBC Radio Scotland – presenter, comedy sketch writer)
- Armando Iannucci (BBC Radio 1 – writer, presenter, producer)
- The News Quiz (BBC Radio 4 – producer, also appeared as guest)
- Quote... Unquote (BBC Radio 4 – producer)
- Loose Talk (producer)
- The Mary Whitehouse Experience (producer)
- Knowing Me Knowing You with Alan Partridge (producer)
- The 99p Challenge (BBC Radio 4)
- Armando Iannucci's Charm Offensive (BBC Radio 4)
- Lionel Nimrod's Inexplicable World (as various characters)
- Desert Island Discs (BBC Radio 4 – guest). Iannucci revealed how as a youngster he rebelled against his parents' "classical music listening ways" by playing Wagner.
- Scraps With Iannucci (BBC Radio 4 series from 1998)
- Week Ending (BBC Radio 4 – producer)
- Richard Herring's Leicester Square Theatre Podcast (several times as a guest)
- The Unbelievable Truth (BBC Radio 4 – guest)
- Strong Message Here (BBC Radio 4 – host)

=== Bibliography ===
==== Books ====
- Facts and Fancies (Michael Joseph, 1997) ISBN 0-7181-3951-8
- Alan Partridge: Every Ruddy Word All the Scripts: From Radio to TV. And Back by Steve Coogan, Peter Baynham, Armando Iannucci, Patrick Marber (Michael Joseph, 2003) ISBN 0-7181-4678-6
- The Thick of It: The Scripts by Jesse Armstrong, Armando Iannucci, Simon Blackwell (Hodder & Stoughton, 2007) ISBN 978-0340937068
- The Audacity of Hype: Bewilderment, Sleaze and Other Tales of the 21st Century (Little, Brown, 2009) ISBN 978-1-4087-0197-3
- The Thick of It: The Missing DoSAC Files (Faber & Faber, 2010) ISBN 978-0-571-27254-9
- I, Partridge: We Need To Talk About Alan by Rob Gibbons, Neil Gibbons, Armando Iannucci and Steve Coogan (Harper Collins, 2011) ISBN 978-0007449170
- Hear Me Out: All My Music (Little, Brown, 2017) ISBN 978-1-4087-0988-7
- Pandemonium: Some Verses on the Utter Beggaring of Belief (Hachette, 2021) ISBN 9781408715086

==== Audiobooks ====
- Facts and Fancies (BBC Audiobooks, 1998) ISBN 0-563-55756-7
- I'm Alan Partridge: Knowing Me, Knowing Yule (BBC Audiobooks, 1998) ISBN 0-563-55763-X
- Knowing Me, Knowing You...: With Alan Partridge: Complete Series (BBC Audiobooks, 1995) CD ISBN 0-563-38896-X, cassette ISBN 0-563-38891-9

==== Interviews ====
- Ioffe, Julia (March 2018). "'Humorless politicians are the most dangerous'". Dispatches. Interview. The Atlantic. Vol. 321, no. 2. pp. 18–21.

== Honours and recognition ==
Iannucci has won two Sony Radio Awards and three British Comedy Awards. In 2003, he was listed in The Observer as one of the 50 funniest acts in British comedy. He was also subject of a 2006 edition of The South Bank Show. In January 2006 he was named News International Visiting Professor of Broadcast Media at the University of Oxford, where he has delivered a series of four lectures under the title "British Comedy – Dead Or Alive?".

In June 2011, he was awarded an honorary Doctor of Letters by the University of Glasgow to recognise his contribution to film and television. At the 2011 British Comedy Awards, Iannucci received the Writers' Guild of Britain Award.

He was appointed Officer of the Order of the British Empire (OBE) in the 2012 Birthday Honours for services to broadcasting. Alastair Campbell's response to his appointment was "Three little letters can have more impact than you realise", to which Iannucci replied, via Twitter, "WMD" (a reference to Campbell's role in preparing the "September Dossier" prior to the 2003 invasion of Iraq). In July 2012 Iannucci received an honorary Doctorate (DLitt) from the University of Exeter. He was elected a Fellow of the Royal Society of Literature (FRSL) in 2019. He was appointed Commander of the Order of the British Empire (CBE) in the 2024 Birthday Honours for services to film and television.

=== Awards and nominations ===
Award	Year	Category	Recipient(s) and nominee(s)	Result	Ref(s)
Academy Awards	2009	Best Adapted Screenplay	In the Loop	Nominated	
British Academy Film Awards	2009	Best Adapted Screenplay	In the Loop	Nominated	
British Academy Film Awards	2009	Outstanding British Film	In the Loop	Nominated	
British Academy Film Awards	2018	Best Adapted Screenplay	The Death of Stalin	Nominated	
British Academy Film Awards	2018	Outstanding British Film	The Death of Stalin	Nominated	
British Academy Television Awards	1995	Best Entertainment Performance	Knowing Me, Knowing You... with Alan Partridge	Nominated	
British Academy Television Awards	1998	Best Comedy	I'm Alan Partridge	Won	
British Academy Television Awards	2010	Best Situation Comedy	The Thick of It	Won	
British Academy Television Awards	2010	Best Writer – Comedy	The Thick of It	Nominated	
British Academy Scotland Awards	2009	Best Director in Film/Television	In the Loop	Won	
British Academy Scotland Awards	2009	Best Writer Film/Television	In the Loop	Won	
British Academy Scotland Awards	2017	Outstanding Contribution to Film & Television	Himself	Won	
British Academy Scotland Awards	2018	Best Director in Film/Television	The Death of Stalin	Won	
British Academy Scotland Awards	2018	Best Writer Film/Television	The Death of Stalin	Won	
British Independent Film Awards	2009	Best Director	In the Loop	Nominated	
British Independent Film Awards	2009	The Douglas Hickox Award	In the Loop	Nominated	
British Independent Film Awards	2009	Best Screenplay	In the Loop	Won	
British Independent Film Awards	2017	Best British Independent Film	The Death of Stalin	Nominated	
British Independent Film Awards	2017	Best Screenplay	The Death of Stalin	Nominated	
British Independent Film Awards	2019	Best British Independent Film	The Personal History of David Copperfield	Nominated	
British Independent Film Awards	2019	Best Screenplay	The Personal History of David Copperfield	Won	
Primetime Emmy Awards	2012	Outstanding Comedy Series	Veep	Nominated	
Primetime Emmy Awards	2013	Outstanding Comedy Series	Veep	Nominated	
Primetime Emmy Awards	2014	Outstanding Comedy Series	Veep	Nominated	
Primetime Emmy Awards	2014	Outstanding Writing for a Comedy Series	Veep	Nominated	
Primetime Emmy Awards	2015	Outstanding Comedy Series	Veep	Won	
Primetime Emmy Awards	2015	Outstanding Directing for a Comedy Series	Veep	Nominated	
Primetime Emmy Awards	2015	Outstanding Writing for a Comedy Series	Veep	Won	
European Film Awards	2018	Best Comedy	The Death of Stalin	Won	
European Film Awards	2018	People's Choice Award	The Death of Stalin	Nominated	
London Film Critics' Circle Awards	2010	Breakthrough British Filmmaker	In the Loop	Nominated	
London Film Critics' Circle Awards	2010	Director of the Year	In the Loop	Nominated	
London Film Critics' Circle Awards	2010	Screenwriter of the Year	In the Loop	Won	
National Society of Film Critics Awards	2018	Best Screenplay	The Death of Stalin	Won	
Producers Guild of America Awards	2014	Best Episodic Comedy	Veep	Nominated	
Producers Guild of America Awards	2015	Best Episodic Comedy	Veep	Nominated	
Producers Guild of America Awards	2016	Best Episodic Comedy	Veep	Nominated	
Satellite Awards	2019	Best Adapted Screenplay	The Death of Stalin	Nominated	
Writers Guild of America Awards	2013	Best New Series	Veep	Nominated	
Writers Guild of America Awards	2014	Best Comedy Series	Veep	Won	
Writers Guild of America Awards	2015	Best Comedy Series	Veep	Nominated	
Writers Guild of America Awards	2016	Best Comedy Series	Veep	Won	

== See also ==
- List of British film directors
- List of Academy Award winners and nominees from Great Britain
- List of Primetime Emmy Award winners
