= Time Trumpet =

2006 British TV comedy series

- Time Trumpet (opening title screen)
- Created by: Armando Iannucci; Roger Drew; Will Smith
- Starring: Richard Ayoade; Matthew Holness; Adam Buxton; Jo Enright; Stewart Lee; Jo Neary; Mark Watson; David Sant
- Country of origin: United Kingdom
- Original language: English
- No. of seasons: 1
- No. of episodes: 6

Production
- Running time: approx. 30 minutes (per episode)

Original release
- Network: BBC Two
- Release: 3 August – 7 September 2006

Time Trumpet is a six-episode satirical television comedy series which aired on BBC Two in August 2006. The series was written by Armando Iannucci, Roger Drew and Will Smith in a similar manner to Iannucci's earlier one-off programmes, 2004: The Stupid Version and Clinton: His Struggle with Dirt. One sketch was later spun off by network in Ireland, RTÉ, into the cult television series Soupy Norman, in May 2007.

== Premise ==
Time Trumpet is set in the year 2031, and is a retrospective documentary on the first thirty years of the 21st century. Actors and actresses play the parts of 'today's stars' thirty years on, who are interviewed as part of the show.

These 'older selves' portrayed include David Beckham, Anne Robinson, David Cameron, Sebastian Coe, Kate Middleton, Charlotte Church, Ant & Dec, June Sarpong, Tony Blair, Alastair Campbell, Charles Clarke, Noel Edmonds, Chris Moyles, Gordon Brown, David Miliband, Bob Geldof, Saddam Hussein, Natasha Kaplinsky, Prince Harry, Jamie Oliver and Paul Burrell.

The show also includes interviews with comedians, billed in the show as "top cultural commentators slash TV pundits", speaking about the events of the past. These include Stewart Lee (also appearing as the bald-headed 'Stu Lee', the implication being that he was contractually obliged to shave his head and change his name), Richard Ayoade, Jo Enright, Matthew Holness, Adam Buxton, Mark Watson and David Sant. Additionally, Katy Wix and Tim Key appear in sketches throughout the series.

Every episode is narrated by Iannucci, who is also seen interviewing guests, but at an oblique angle and with a different physical appearance. Series co-creator Will Smith also appears in the series.

Each episode has a main theme running throughout, such as the Olympics or the war in Iraq. The main running gag is the promise of a catch-up with "an increasingly odd Tom Cruise" and features the now-elderly actor making bizarre claims such as to be "pound for pound the world's strongest man".

== Episodes ==
Episode	Airdate	Main theme	Featured content
Episode 1	3 August 2006	Early 21st Century Politics	A CBBC show called 'Spicey Slicey', where youngsters go under the knife live on air; Honey, I Shrunk Martha Kearney, a revamped Newsnight; The special effects behind EastEnders; Charlotte Church vomiting herself inside out
Episode 2	10 August 2006	Binge Drinking in Britain	An outbreak of binge drinking which led to an inquiry by Ant and Dec; Painting a Wall featuring Gavin Esler, John Humphrys, Germaine Greer and Nicholas Owen; June Sarpong's Donkey Monkey Question Time with guest David Cameron; Dermot Murnaghan's on-air suicide; Gordon Brown's difficult ascent to power
Episode 3	24 August 2006	The War on Terror	The war on terror resulting in anything too terrifying or frightening banned and strip searching becoming so commonplace people now walk around naked; Catching up with Tim Henman; The Girl with the Voice of Boris Johnson; Cilla Black's live autopsy
Episode 4	17 August 2006	The Royal Family	The most popular television show of all time, Rape an Ape; War between Tesco and Denmark; A decline in popularity for the Royal Family, which leads to no one turning up at the coronation of King Charles and a royal referendum; The hit Polish soap opera Pierwsza miłość
Episode 5	31 August 2006	Iraq War	The War in Iraq and Tony Blair's relocation to the Middle East; Bob Geldof's concert to end death; The Hutton Inquiry proving that David Kelly may not have even existed; The BBC lifting a ban on product placement
Episode 6	7 September 2006	The 2012 Olympics	Whistle-blowing UKTV Gold show, TV Uncovered; The rise to power of the BNP following David Cameron's twenty days as prime minister; Sebastian Coe murdering Justin Lee Collins after he revealed the London 2012 Olympics were a hoax; A catch up with an increasingly odd Tom Cruise

== Controversy ==
The third episode, which featured a jumbo jet crashing into the British Houses of Parliament and the subsequent assassination of Tony Blair, was due to be screened on 17 August 2006, but was cancelled in the wake of the 2006 transatlantic aircraft plot, and replaced by another episode. The cancelled episode was subsequently shown a week later, without the footage of an assassinated Blair. However, a related sketch was aired, involving a play on the events of 9/11, where two towers are flown into an aeroplane.

== Home media ==
A DVD of the series was released on 27 April 2009. The assassination of Tony Blair sketch was removed from this, as were some sketches that included footage of the Olympic Games.

== Legacy ==
- One sketch depicted real life Polish soap opera Pierwsza miłość becoming a hit across Europe, which was followed by a scene dubbed into English in a humorous way, changing the setting from Poland to Ireland. This ended up forming the basis of the cult television show Soupy Norman on RTÉ.
- Alan Moore's final issue of The League of Extraordinary Gentlemen includes a reference to the in series game show "Rape an Ape", as well as several references to Iannucci's The Thick of It.

=== American remake ===
In December 2011, network in the United States, Comedy Central announced they would be remaking the series, with Iannucci as producer. Ultimately, the series was not picked up by the network, and Iannucci moved on to other projects.
