= One Minute Wonders =

British children's television series

One Minute Wonders is a factual television series for children produced by Unique TV for CBBC. Starring David Schneider as the voice of Blink, the series consists of 13 episodes with each episode running 28 minutes.

The series combines live action material filmed by Unique TV, animation produced by Karrot Animation and archive footage from the BBC Worldwide Motion Gallery.

The series first aired on 5 January 2009 on BBC One.
