= The Saturday Night Armistice =

British TV satirical comedy series (1995–1999)

- Armando Iannucci, Peter Baynham and David Schneider presenting the 1 July 1995 episode of The Saturday Night Armistice. The "Mr Tony Blair" prop is visible to the left of Iannucci.
- Also known as: The Friday Night Armistice
- Starring: Armando Iannucci, Peter Baynham, David Schneider
- Country of origin: United Kingdom
- Original language: English
- No. of episodes: 24

Production
- Producer: Sarah Smith
- Running time: 30 min per normal episode

Original release
- Network: BBC2
- Release: 24 June 1995 – 1 January 1999

The Saturday Night Armistice (later The Friday Night Armistice, plus the one-off The Election Night Armistice) is a British satirical television comedy programme presented by Armando Iannucci with Peter Baynham and David Schneider that ran from 24 June 1995 to 1 January 1999.

The programme took an irreverent and often surreal look back at topical events, and featured studio discussions, sketches and setups. Like many 1990s British comedy series it included appearances and writing contributions by a large number of UK comedians including amongst others Arthur Mathews, Graham Linehan, Simon Pegg, Andy Riley, Kevin Cecil, Kevin Eldon, Steve Pemberton, Reece Shearsmith, Danny Erskine, Omid Djalili, Al Murray, Ben Moor, Mel Giedroyc and Sue Perkins.

== Format ==
The show took an irreverent look back at the events in the previous week, although as with Iannucci's previous news satire The Day Today, ideas were often taken in surreal directions by the three protagonists, for example an Orange March demanding passage through a ladies' toilet because it used to be a gents' 200 years ago. Iannucci was the main presenter and sat at a desk with Schneider and Baynham sitting on an adjacent black leather sofa. On Armando's desk was a rotund cuddly toy named "Mister Tony Blair," an extreme characterisation of the then-Leader of the Opposition. In a manner similar to Sooty, Mr Tony Blair could only be heard by Armando, opening up a wealth of opportunities for humour based on whatever comments the real-life Blair may or may not have made that week.

Along with sketches, there were also a number of humorous set-ups, such as Armando tricking O. J. Simpson into autographing a folded piece of paper stating "I DID IT" or sending a bus of Princess Diana-lookalikes to take photographs of News International journalists leaving their office. The programme featured a title theme sung by Johnny More in the style of Frank Sinatra.

The programme also had a number of weekly recurring items, for example "Hunt the Old Woman", where the viewers were challenged to find the old lady of the title making an unexpected cameo appearance on national television during the previous week. Her most famous appearance was at Royal Ascot where she could be spotted wearing a large hat emblazoned with the legend "I am an Old Woman," a photograph of which actually made the front page of The Times. The prize for spotting her appearances was originally "The Saturday Night Armistice Hors d'Œuvre Tree" complete with a different selection of Hors d'œuvres each week. This reward later changed to the much coveted set of "Friday Night Armistice Dart Flights". Other features included a bus full of Princess Diana lookalikes turning up in bizarre locations, the travels of the "Mr Tony Blair" puppet and Peter's Miniaturised Area (complete with a miniaturised Mr Tony Blair), and later called "What Happened Next?", which showed a supposed CCTV clip that followed an item of news.

In 1996, scheduling changes and low Saturday-night ratings meant the programme became The Friday Night Armistice. The team did a live 3 hour-long 1997 Election special (The Election Night Armistice, broadcast on BBC 2 at the same time as BBC 1's main election programme) and a third series in 1998 and several Christmas and New Year specials, the last one airing in January 1999. A fourth series was announced for broadcast in 1999 but was not produced.

None of the episodes has ever been made available commercially and owing to their topical nature are unlikely to gain a release on DVD. However, episodes have been distributed on the internet via various BitTorrent download sites.

== Episode guide ==
- The Saturday Night Armistice
  - Episode 1, 24 June 1995
  - Episode 2, 1 July 1995
  - Episode 3, 8 July 1995
  - Episode 4, 22 July 1995
  - Episode 5, 29 July 1995
  - Episode 6, 5 August 1995
- The Saturday Night Armistice Party Bucket (Christmas special of series highlights), 22 December 1995
- The Friday Night Armistice
  - Episode 1, 14 June 1996
  - Episode 2, 21 June 1996
  - Episode 3, 28 June 1996
  - Episode 4, 5 July 1996
  - Episode 5, 12 July 1996
  - Episode 6, 19 July 1996
- The Election Night Armistice (3 hour special for the 1997 general election), 1 May 1997
- The Christmas Armistice (Christmas special of 1997 highlights and new material), 29 December 1997
- The Armistice Party Bucket (New Year special of more 1997 highlights and new material), 2 January 1998
- The Friday Night Armistice
  - Episode 1, 9 January 1998
  - Episode 2, 16 January 1998
  - Episode 3, 23 January 1998
  - Episode 4, 30 January 1998
  - Episode 5, 6 February 1998
  - Episode 6, 13 February 1998
- The Christmas Armistice (Christmas special of 1998 highlights and new material), 29 December 1998
- The New Year Armistice (New Year special of more 1998 highlights and new material), 1 January 1999
