= David Ellington =

English actor and TV presenter

David Ellington is an English actor and presenter based in Bristol. He is Deaf and uses British Sign Language (BSL).

== Career ==
Ellington started acting in 1997. Theatre credits include Frozen (Fingersmiths), Bent / Diary of an Action Man (Graeae), Under Milk Wood (Oxfordshire Theatre Tour Company), Extraordinary Wall of Silence (Ad Infinitum). He won Best Actor for DEF in the Deaf Oscars.

Ellington explores various artistic forms, like circus art and street theatre, taking part in productions such as Extraordinary Bodies - What Am I Worth / Weighting (Diverse City & Cirque Bijou).

He has appeared in television productions, such as The Inspector Lynley Mysteries (BBC) and Holby City (BBC). Ellington was also part of the London 2012 Paralympic Opening Ceremony, and has featured signing throughout a commercial for Channel 4, broadcast to celebrate the end of the 2016 Summer Olympics.

He appears regularly on BBC's Deaf magazine See Hear. He has directed a documentary focused on the racism within the Deaf community, "Dismantling Racism", on the wake of the Black Lives Matter movement.

In 2007 he founded VS1 Production, a company specialised in video productions featuring British Sign Language (BSL).
