= Clinton: His Struggle with Dirt =

1998 TV movie

Clinton: His Struggle with Dirt is a satire from 1998 written and narrated by Armando Iannucci, in a similar style to his later shows, such as Time Trumpet. Purporting to be a documentary from the future (2028), it casts actors as older versions of real people, such as Bill Clinton and Monica Lewinsky, who are depicted in a comic account of the Lewinsky scandal.
