= John Biggins =

British writer of historical fiction

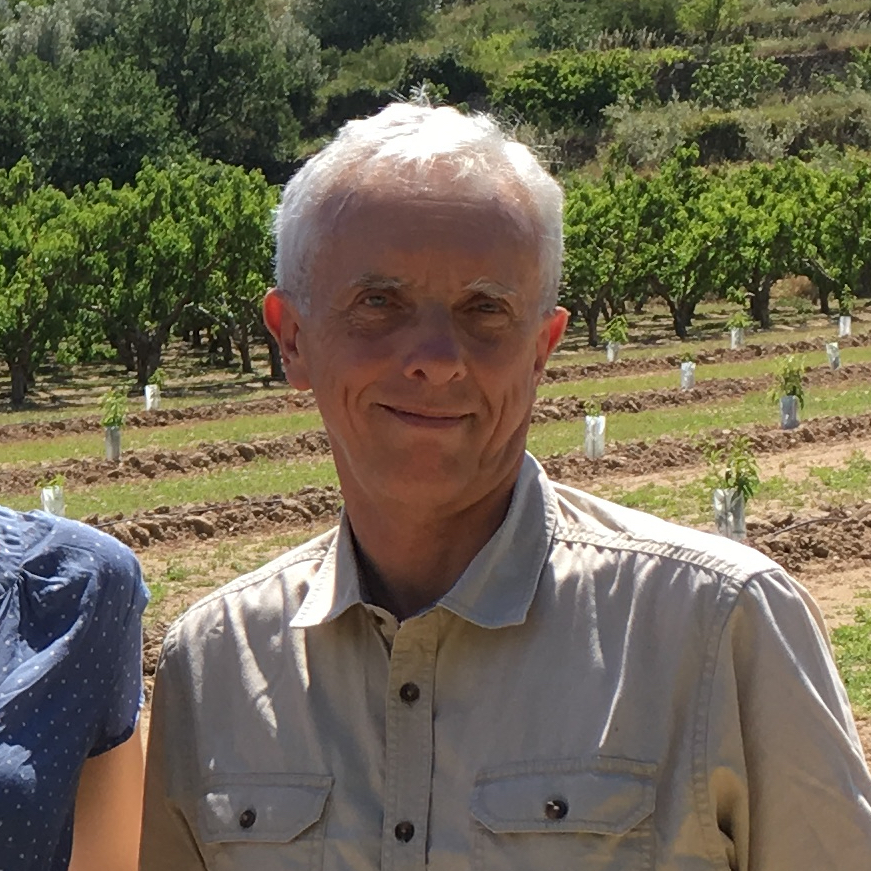
- John Biggins
- Born: October 1949 (age 75–76); Bromley, Greater London, England
- Occupation: Novelist

John Biggins (born 31 October 1949) is a British writer of historical fiction. He is best known for his Prohaska series of novels set in the Austro-Hungarian Navy during the early years of the 20th Century.

== Early life ==
Biggins was born in Bromley to a Jewish household in Greater London, England. He attended Chepstow Secondary and Lydney Grammar Schools, and studied history at the University of Wales from 1968 to 1971. He continued his graduate studies in Poland.

== Career ==
As a young man Biggins worked as a civil servant for the UK Ministry of Agriculture. He also worked as a journalist and did technical writing before becoming an author of historical fiction.

In 1991 the first of Biggins' Prohaska novels, A Sailor of Austria, was published by Secker & Warburg. The story is set in the Austro-Hungarian Navy during World War I, and vividly depicts life on board the primitive and dangerous U-boats of the period. Kirkus Reviews reported the book to be well researched, but called it "bland and mundane". The Historical Novel Society, on the other hand, deemed it "Excellent military fiction", and similarly praised his later book Tomorrow The World.

In 2010 Biggins began a new series of novels, and self-published his book, The Surgeon's Apprentice. This novel was included by The Spectator magazine on its "Books of the Year" list, described as a "soundly researched tale of sea-faring and warfare." In 2021 he published its sequel, "The Lion Ascendant".

His previous books are now being distributed by Bonanova Editions.

== Bibliography ==
=== The Prohaska series ===
==== Overview ====
Ottokar Prohaska, the fictional protagonist, is a Czech by birth, but an Austrian naval officer by vocation. His exploits have elements of both adventure and comedy. The historical background is the last years of the Austro-Hungarian empire, and in particular, in the case of two of the novels, World War I. The reader finds the hero/anti-hero, at different times, a gunnery officer aboard a ship, a submarine commander, and a member of the flying corps.

- A Sailor of Austria (1991)
- Vivat Österreich! (2011) – German translation of A Sailor of Austria (1991)
- The Emperor's Coloured Coat (1992)
- The Two-Headed Eagle (1993)
- Tomorrow The World (1994)

=== The van Raveyck series ===
- The Surgeon's Apprentice (2010)
- The Lion Ascendant (2021)
