= The Armando Iannucci Shows =

- Title screen of episode 2. In the series, the castle-like building (Highfort Court, Kingsbury) is Armando's house.
- Created by: Armando Iannucci
- Starring: Armando Iannucci
- Country of origin: United Kingdom
- Original language: English
- No. of episodes: 8

Production
- Running time: approx. 24m30s (per episode)

Original release
- Network: Channel 4
- Release: 30 August – 18 October 2001

The Armando Iannucci Shows is a series of eight programmes directed by Armando Iannucci and written by Iannucci with Andy Riley and Kevin Cecil. It was shown on UK's Channel 4 from 30 August to 18 October 2001. Each episode focused on specific themes related to human nature and existentialism, around which Iannucci would weave a series of surreal sketches and monologues.

== Format ==
Recurring themes in the episodes are the superficiality of modern culture, our problems communicating with each other, the mundane nature of working life and feelings of personal inadequacy and social awkwardness. Several characters also make repeat appearances in the shows, including the East End thug, who solves every problem with threats of violence; Hugh, an old man who delivers surreal monologues about what things were like in the old days; and Iannucci's barber, Luca, who is full of nonsensical anecdotes.

== Recurring characters ==
Most of the sketches and characters in The Armando Iannucci Shows were one-offs, but a few characters did recur:

- Luca (Steve Brody) - An Italian barber who regales Armando with bizarre theories and anecdotes rather than cutting his hair.
- The East End Thug (Alan Ford) - A middle-aged cockney villain who can solve almost any problem through the medium of violent gangland threats.
- Hugh (Hugh Cecil) - an old man who visits Armando and recalls his past, his reminiscences containing a modern twist.
- The Television Executives (Tony Gardner, Darren Higham, Melanie Hudson and Stephen Mangan) - a group of TV executives unable to conceive of anything other than in terms of a TV pitch. Usually end up congratulating themselves with a conga ("We're so good at telly").

== Episodes ==
Each episode is themed around a certain subject. The following episode order is according to the DVD which had its contents significantly reshuffled from the original broadcast timeline.

No.	Title	Original release date
1	"Twats"	30 August 2001
Armando worries about looking like a twat in front of other people. He worries about what other people think about him, them judging him by his appearance, what he thinks and his lack of football knowledge. He even worries about a man known for telling brilliant jokes, who is appearing at his next dinner party, and in front of whom he may appear foolish.
2	"Work"	6 September 2001
Armando claims that almost everyone made a wrong decision around eight years ago, which explains why they end up with terrible jobs. From clowns becoming teachers, to sniffer dogs deciding to go to Bangkok on an impulse, it appears the only person whom Armando knows who truly likes their job is his barber.
3	"Communication"	13 September 2001
Armando realises that most people do not talk to each other, which is why people end up going to landfills after nailing themselves into DIY cupboards. More problems arise in the form of racist police horses, and even a bride using a racist accent during her marriage to her Indian groom.
4	"Imagination"	20 September 2001
Armando believes that the imagination is a wonderful thing, allowing us to come up with any image, such as the cast of Cats being shot at dawn. Everyone attempts to try to become more imaginative, such as profane gardening and improving suicide notes. However, the greatest worry is people starving to death due to there being too many golf sales. This episode was originally aired last in the series, providing a conclusion in which Armando, by taunting animals with various human inventions, seems to have accidentally taught them how to take over the world.
5	"Time Passing"	27 September 2001
With time passing ever more quickly, Armando worries about growing older. He admires Hugh for keeping the past alive, but panics about turning into one of the old men with bushy eyebrows that gave him nightmares as a child. Only one man can save children in later life - "Armando - The Great Adult!"
6	"Neighbours"	4 October 2001
Armando wants to know what his neighbours are really like. He discovers what they think of each other, their prejudices, and one woman's experience with her stolen dresses, now being worn by people like Eddie Izzard. Even neighbours from outer space can be very rude.
7	"Morality"	11 October 2001
Armando is worried about people's morality. Whilst one priest inspires his congregation so much they will not leave him alone, another shows pornographic masses. Armando starts to wonder if there is anything we do which is not evil, as he discovers when some protesters attack him for putting something in someone else's skip.
8	"Reality"	18 October 2001
Armando has trouble sleeping. This is due to his fridge making a sound of a trumpet, being beaten up by an intruder, and his recurring nightmare involving his most dreaded expression, "Except for those viewers in Scotland, who have their own programmes."

== Music ==
The original broadcast version featured a number of modern classical pieces including:

- Spiegel im Spiegel – Arvo Pärt – Angela Yoffe and Vadim Gluzman
- Shaker Loops: I. Shaking and Trembling – John Adams, London Symphony Orchestra and the Orchestra of St. Luke's
- Tracery – Nusrat Fateh Ali Khan
- Cantus In Memoriam Benjamin Britten – Arvo Pärt
- Symphony of Sorrowful Songs, 2nd movement – Henryk Górecki

Other classical pieces included:

- "The Aquarium" from The Carnival of the Animals – Camille Saint-Saëns
- Serenade to Music (orchestral version) – Ralph Vaughan Williams
- Wachet auf, ruft uns die Stimme – Johann Sebastian Bach
- "Herr, unser Herrscher" from St John Passion – J. S. Bach

Some of these pieces had to be removed from the DVD due to rights issues, and were replaced with stock library music.

There is also a snippet of an imaginary modern opera, "Ibiza Uncovered", that is very close to the style of the opera of John Adams.

== Reception ==
Iannucci has been quoted as saying it is the comedy series he is most proud of making. He told The Metro in April 2007 "The Armando Iannucci Show [sic] on Channel 4 came out around 9/11, so it was overlooked for good reasons. People had other things on their minds. But that was the closest to me expressing my comic outlook on life."

The show is also notable for its use of music, the quality of its direction and the often extensive use of CGI effects. A DVD of the series was released on 4 September 2006 after years of wrangles due to music rights issues.

Empire called the show "a lesser effort, even if this does display flashes of the wit behind The Day Today and The Thick of It."
